= Nizhny Novgorod constituency =

Russian legislative constituency in Nizhny Novgorod Oblast

Nizhny Novgorod single-member constituency
- Constituency of the Russian State Duma

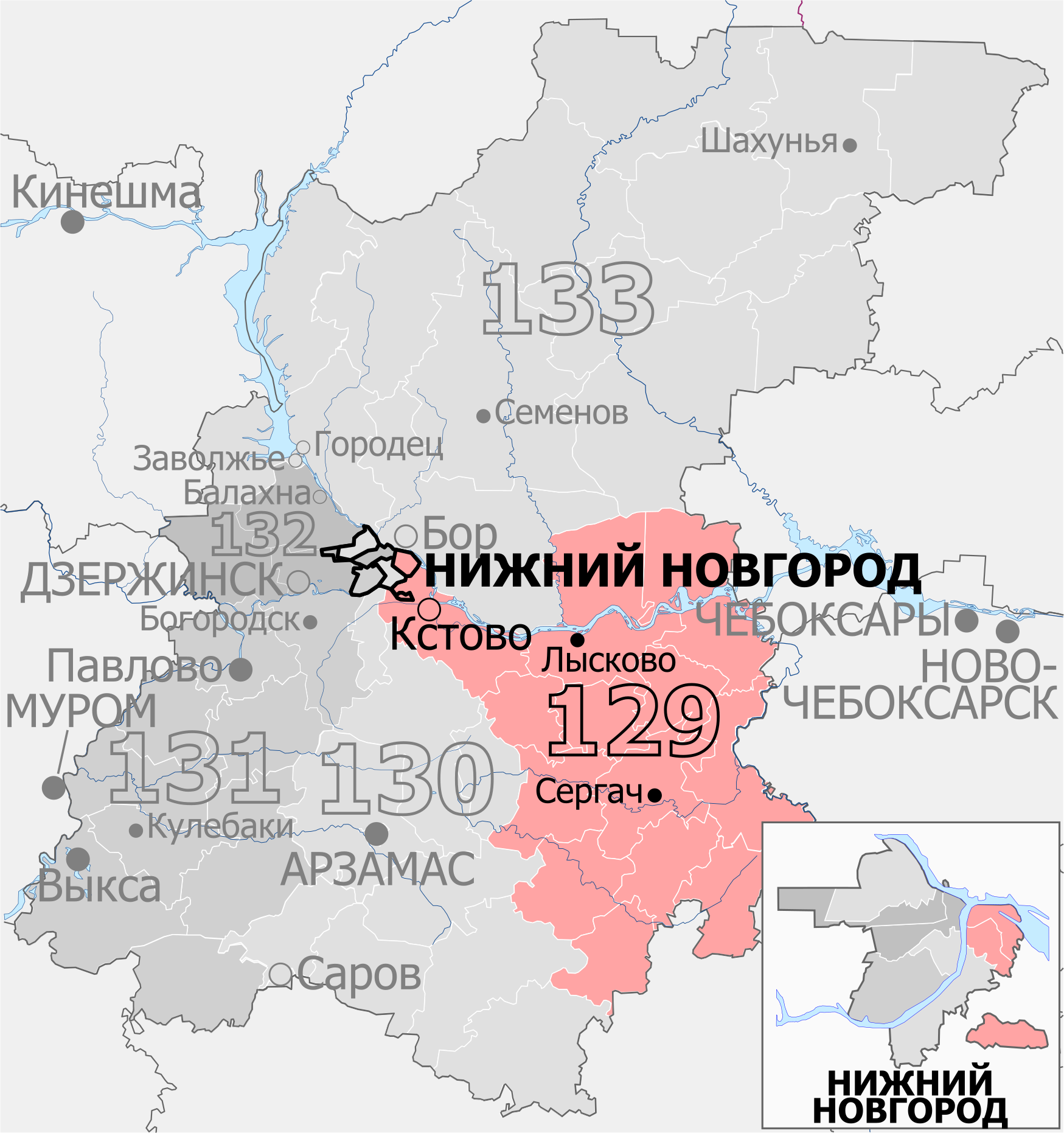
- Constituency boundaries since 2016
- Deputy: Yury Stankevich; United Russia
- Federal subject: Nizhny Novgorod Oblast
- Districts: Nizhny Novgorod city districts: Nizhegorodsky, Sovetsky; Districts: Bolsheboldinsky, Bolshemurashkinsky, Buturlinsky, Vorotynsky, Gaginsky, Knyagininsky, Krasnooktyabrsky, Kstovsky, Lyskovsky, Pilninsky, Sergachsky, Sechenovsky, Spassky District
- Voters: 475,168 (2026)

The Nizhny Novgorod constituency (No.131 (Note: No.122 Sergach constituency in 1993-2003, No.121 Kstovo constituency in 2003-2007, No.129 in 2016–2026)) is a Russian legislative constituency in Nizhny Novgorod Oblast. The constituency covers eastern Nizhny Novgorod, including the historic city centre, as well as rural eastern Nizhny Novgorod Oblast. In 2016–2026 this seat also served as the constituency for all Russian expatriates living in countries which were not already assigned to other constituencies, 98 foreign countries in total. (Note: Albania, Angola and São Tomé and Príncipe, Armenia, Afghanistan, Bangladesh, Bahrain, Benin and Togo, Bolivia, Bosnia and Herzegovina, Botswana, Brunei, Burundi, Gabon, Guyana, Ghana and Liberia, Guatemala, Guinea-Bissau, Guinea and Sierra-Leone, Democratic Republic of the Congo, Djibouti and Somalia, Zambia, Zimbabwe and Malawi, Yemen, Indonesia and East Timor, Iran, Iceland, Cape Verde, Cambodia, Cameroon and Equatorial Guinea, Qatar, Kenya, North Korea, Colombia, Republic of the Congo, Costa Rica, Ivory Coast and Burkina Faso, Kuwait, Laos, Libya, Luxembourg, Mauritius, Mauritania, Madagascar and Comoros, North Macedonia, Malaysia, Mali and Niger, Malta, Mozambique and Eswatini, Myanmar, Namibia, Nepal, Nigeria, Nicaragua, Honduras and El Salvador, Oman, Pakistan, Palestine, Panama, Paraguay, Peru, Rwanda, Romania, Saudi Arabia, Seychelles, Senegal and Gambia, Singapore, Slovenia, Sudan, Tanzania, Tunisia, Uganda and South Sudan, Uruguay, Philippines and Palau, Central Africa Republic, Chad, Chile, Sri Lanka and Maldives, Ecuador, Eritrea, Ethiopia, Jamaica)

The constituency has been represented since 2026 by United Russia deputy Yury Stankevich, two-term State Duma member and former Lukoil executive, who won the open seat, succeeding one-term United Russia incumbent Anatoly Lesun.

== Boundaries ==
1993–2003 Sergach constituency: Bolshemurashkinsky District, Bor, Borsky District, Buturlinsky District, Gaginsky District, Knyagininsky District, Krasnooktyabrsky District, Kstovo, Kstovsky District, Lyskovsky District, Nizhny Novgorod (Prioksky), Perevozsky District, Pilninsky District, Sechenovsky District, Sergach, Sergachsky District, Spassky District, Vorotynsky District
The constituency covered eastern Prioksky City District of Nizhny Novgorod, its industrial satellite cities Bor and Kstovo as well as mostly rural central and eastern Nizhny Novgorod Oblast.

1995–2003 Sergach constituency: Bolshemurashkinsky District, Bor, Borsky District, Buturlinsky District, Knyagininsky District, Krasnooktyabrsky District, Kstovo, Kstovsky District, Lyskovsky District, Nizhny Novgorod (Prioksky), Perevozsky District, Pilninsky District, Sechenovsky District, Sergach, Sergachsky District, Spassky District, Vorotynsky District
After 1995 the constituency was slightly altered, losing Gaginsky District to Arzamas constituency.

2003–2007 Kstovo constituency: Bolshemurashkinsky District, Borsky District, Buturlinsky District, Knyagininsky District, Krasnooktyabrsky District, Kstovsky District, Lyskovsky District, Nizhny Novgorod (Prioksky), Perevozsky District, Pilninsky District, Sechenovsky District, Sergach, Spassky District, Vorotynsky District
The constituency retained its territory but changed its name from Sergach to Kstovo constituency.

2016–present: Bolsheboldinsky District, Bolshemurashkinsky District, Buturlinsky District, Gaginsky District, Knyagininsky District, Krasnooktyabrsky District, Kstovsky District, Lyskovsky District, Nizhny Novgorod (Nizhegorodsky, Sovetsky), Pilninsky District, Sergachsky District, Sechenovsky District, Spassky District, Vorotynsky District
The constituency was re-created for the 2016 election under the name "Nizhny Novgorod constituency" and retained most of rural eastern Nizhny Novgorod Oblast as well as Kstovo, losing Borsky District to Bor constituency, Prioksky City District of Nizhny Novgorod and Perevozsky District to Prioksky constituency. This seat instead gained rural Bolsheboldinsky District and Gaginsky District from Arzamas constituency, two Nizhny Novgorod city districts: Nizhegorodsky (from Avtozavodsky constituency) and Sovetsky (from Kanavinsky constituency).

== Members elected ==
By-election are shown in italics.

Election	Member	Party
1993	Yevgeny Bushmin	Independent
1995	Aleksandr Maltsev	Independent
1999	Dmitry Savelyev	Independent
2003	Aleksey Likhachev	Union of Right Forces
2007	Proportional representation - no election by constituency	
2011	Proportional representation - no election by constituency	
2016	Vladimir Panov (Note: appointed as Mayor of Nizhny Novgorod in January 2018)	United Russia
2018	Dmitry Svatkovsky	United Russia
2021	Anatoly Lesun	United Russia
2026	Yury Stankevich	United Russia

== Election Results ==
=== 1993 ===
Summary of the 12 December 1993 Russian legislative election in the Sergach constituency
Candidate	Party	Votes	%
Yevgeny Bushmin	Independent	81,656	30.35%
Aleksandr Maltsev	Independent	61,220	22.76%
Aleksey Skotnikov	Independent	39,412	14.65%
Boris Sevryugin	Civic Union	12,350	4.59%
Vladimir Fomin	Democratic Party	10,350	3.85%
against all		39,793	14.79%
Total		269,028	100%

=== 1995 ===
Summary of the 17 December 1995 Russian legislative election in the Sergach constituency
Candidate	Party	Votes	%
Aleksandr Maltsev	Independent	81,474	27.78%
Nadir Khafizov	Independent	64,112	21.86%
Yevgeny Bushmin (incumbent)	Independent	48,960	16.70%
Valery Yeliseyev	Political Movement of Transport Workers	12,654	4.32%
Andrey Morev	Liberal Democratic Party	10,796	3.68%
Vasily Anoshchenkov	Stanislav Govorukhin Bloc	10,373	3.54%
Anatoly Moiseyev	People's Union	8,554	2.92%
Aleksandr Sysoyev	Independent	7,877	2.69%
Gennady Tuzin	Independent	6,511	2.22%
Gennady Shurygin	Independent	5,911	2.02%
Vladimir Maystrenko	Derzhava	4,188	1.43%
against all		23,667	8.07%
Total		293,247	100%

=== 1999 ===
Summary of the 19 December 1999 Russian legislative election in the Sergach constituency
Candidate	Party	Votes	%
Dmitry Savelyev	Independent	79,092	29.36%
Nikolay Ryabov	Independent	31,551	11.71%
Ryashit Bayazitov	Independent	27,123	10.07%
Aleksandr Maltsev (incumbent)	Independent	24,440	9.07%
Nikolay Khvatkov	Independent	21,030	7.81%
Vyacheslav Bolyak	Our Home – Russia	16,793	6.23%
Aleksandr Listkov	Independent	14,165	5.26%
Yevgeny Belyakov	Independent	3,220	1.20%
Nikolay Leshkov	Independent	3,117	1.16%
Yevgeny Alekseyev	Spiritual Heritage	2,887	1.07%
Anatoly Nekrasov	Liberal Democratic Party	2,138	0.79%
Ravil Aksenov	Independent	2,103	0.78%
Dmitry Popkov	Peace, Labour, May	1,256	0.47%
Aleksandr Khrushchev	Independent	912	0.34%
against all		33,954	12.61%
Total		269,349	100%

=== 2003 ===
Summary of the 7 December 2003 Russian legislative election in the Kstovo constituency
Candidate	Party	Votes	%
Aleksey Likhachev	Union of Right Forces	76,187	34.94%
Nikolay Ryabov	Communist Party	32,321	14.82%
Nikolay Khvatkov	Independent	15,715	7.21%
Yury Shcherbakov	Independent	15,692	7.20%
Vladimir Tabunkin	Party of Russia's Rebirth-Russian Party of Life	11,157	5.12%
Vladimir Gryadasov	Independent	7,431	3.41%
Nikolay Gerasimov	Independent	6,444	2.96%
Valery Biryukov	Independent	6,420	2.94%
Aleksandr Rebyatkin	Liberal Democratic Party	5,899	2.71%
Vyacheslav Aksinyin	Independent	3,443	1.58%
Shamil Sudiyarov	Independent	2,497	1.15%
against all		29,311	13.44%
Total		218,093	100%

=== 2016 ===
Summary of the 18 September 2016 Russian legislative election in the Nizhny Novgorod constituency
Candidate	Party	Votes	%
Vladimir Panov	United Russia	87,475	42.39%
Aleksandr Bochkarev	A Just Russia	41,404	20.06%
Denis Voronenkov	Communist Party	28,878	13.99%
Dmitry Nikolayev	Liberal Democratic Party	15,127	7.33%
Anna Stepanova	People's Freedom Party	7,068	3.42%
Ilya Ulyanov	Communists of Russia	6,952	3.37%
Valery Kuznetsov	Party of Growth	6,824	3.31%
Aleksey Molev	Rodina	4,072	1.97%
Total		206,377	100%

=== 2018 ===
Summary of the 9 September 2018 by-election in the Nizhny Novgorod constituency
Candidate	Party	Votes	%
Dmitry Svatkovsky	United Russia	80,993	47.34%
Nikolay Ryabov	Communist Party	38,185	22.32%
Tatyana Grinevich	A Just Russia	18,444	10.78%
Aleksey Kruglov	Liberal Democratic Party	15,968	9.33%
Oleg Rodin	Yabloko	7,665	4.48%
Total		171,097	100%

=== 2021 ===
Summary of the 17-19 September 2021 Russian legislative election in the Nizhny Novgorod constituency
Candidate	Party	Votes	%
Anatoly Lesun	United Russia	107,625	43.61%
Tatyana Grinevich	A Just Russia — For Truth	36,495	14.79%
Nikolay Ryabov	Communist Party	31,209	12.65%
Aleksey Kruglov	Liberal Democratic Party	14,010	5.68%
Anna Cherednichenko	New People	13,274	5.38%
Dmitry Dobrovolsky	Communists of Russia	13,211	5.35%
Sergey Rybakov	Party of Pensioners	11,004	4.46%
Mikhail Garanin	Party of Growth	8,354	3.39%
Vladimir Ponomaryov	Rodina	3,741	1.52%
Total		246,789	100%

=== 2026 ===
Summary of the 18-20 September 2026 Russian legislative election in the Nizhny Novgorod constituency
Candidate	Party	Votes	%
Yury Stankevich	United Russia	152,606	54.12%
Aleksey Zapoyev	Communist Party	37,108	13.16%
Aleksey Dushkin	New People	25,102	8.90%
Tatyana Grinevich	A Just Russia	23,556	8.35%
Ivan Korniyenko	Liberal Democratic Party	18,842	6.68%
Andrey Koposov	Party of Pensioners	8,010	2.84%
Yevgeny Volkov	The Greens	7,899	2.80%
Aleksey Kamrakov	Rodina	4,745	1.68%
Total		281,983	100%
