= Prioksky constituency =

Russian legislative constituency in Nizhny Novgorod Oblast

Prioksky single-member constituency
- Constituency of the Russian State Duma

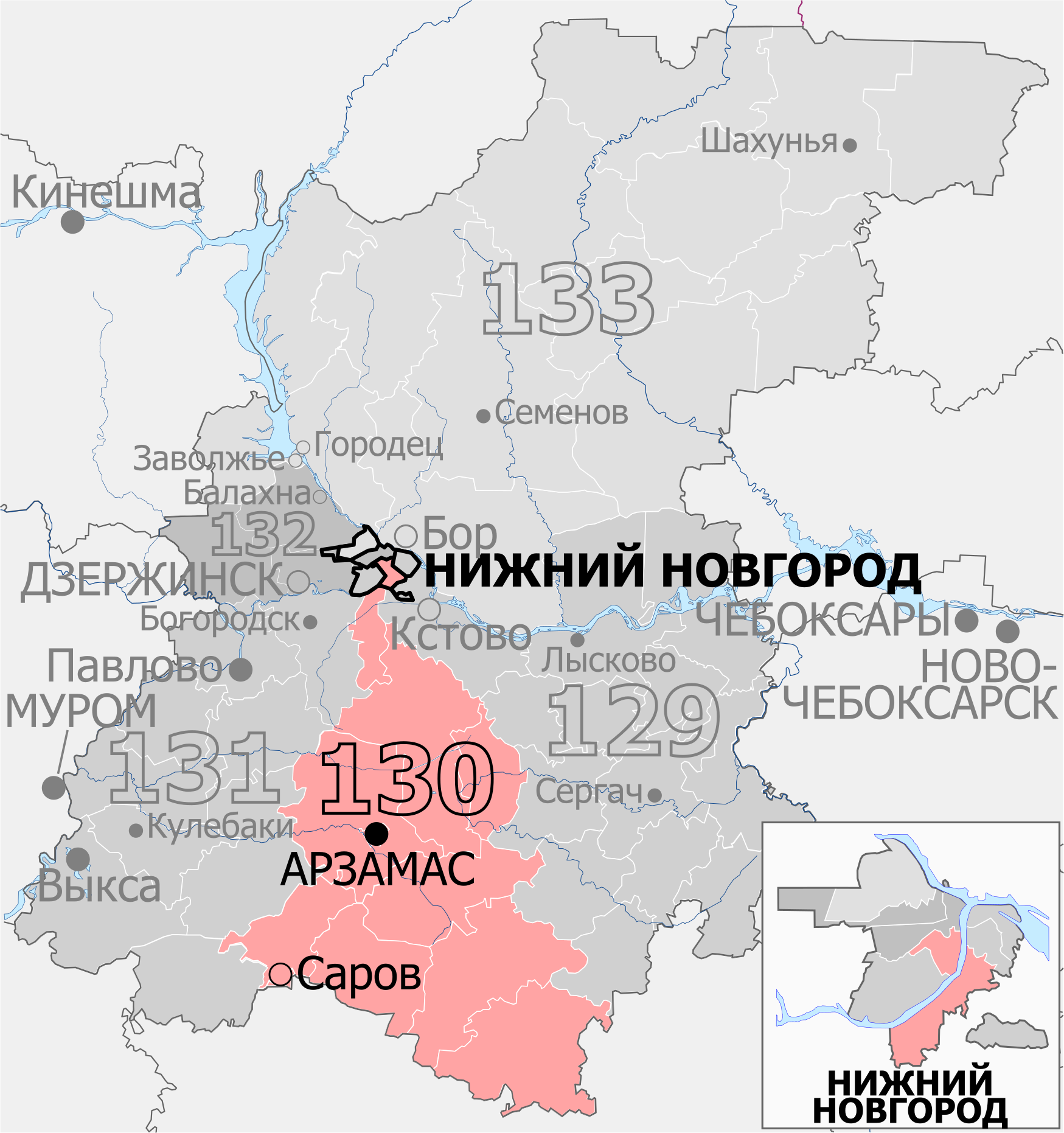
- Constituency boundaries since 2016
- Deputy: Yevgeny Kostin; United Russia
- Federal subject: Nizhny Novgorod Oblast
- Districts: Arzamas, Arzamassky, Bogorodsky (Kamensky, Novinsky), Dalnekonstantinovsky, Diveyevsky, Lukoyanovsky, Nizhny Novgorod (Leninsky, Prioksky), Perevoz, Pervomaysk, Pochinkovsky, Sarov, Shatkovsky, Vadsky
- Voters: 494,633 (2026)

The Prioksky constituency (No.132 (Note: Arzamas constituency No.118 in 1993–2007, No.130 in 2016–2026)) is a Russian legislative constituency in Nizhny Novgorod Oblast. The constituency stretches from southern Nizhny Novgorod to southern Nizhny Novgorod Oblast, including the cities Arzamas and Sarov.

The constituency has been represented since 2026 by United Russia deputy Yevgeny Kostin, former Nizhny Novgorod first deputy chairman and nonprofit president, who won the open seat, succeeding one-term United Russia incumbent Yevgeny Lebedev.

== Boundaries ==
1993–1995 Arzamas constituency: Ardatovsky District, Arzamas, Arzamassky District, Bolsheboldinsky District, Diveyevsky District, Kulebaki, Kulebaksky District, Lukoyanovsky District, Pervomaysky District, Pochinkovsky District, Shatkovsky District, Vadsky District, Voznesensky District, Vyksa, Vyksunsky District
The constituency covered southern Nizhny Novgorod Oblast, including industrial city Arzamas, metallurgical towns Kulebaki and Vyksa, as well as Kremlyov/Sarov, major centre for nuclear physics.

1995–2007 Arzamas constituency: Arzamas, Arzamassky District, Bolsheboldinsky District, Diveyevsky District, Gaginsky District, Kulebaksky District, Lukoyanovsky District, Pervomaysky District, Pochinkovsky District, Sarov, Shatkovsky District, Vadsky District, Voznesensky District, Vyksunsky District
After 1995 the constituency was slightly altered, losing Ardatovsky District to Dzerzhinsk constituency and instead gaining Gaginsky District from Sergach constituency.

2016–present: Arzamas, Arzamassky District, Bogorodsky District (Kamensky, Novinsky), Dalnekonstantinovsky District, Diveyevsky District, Lukoyanovsky District, Nizhny Novgorod (Leninsky, Prioksky), Perevoz, Pervomaysk, Pochinkovsky District, Sarov, Shatkovsky District, Vadsky District
The constituency was re-created for the 2016 election under the name "Prioksky constituency" and retained its central portion, including Arzamas and Sarov, losing Kulebaksky, Voznesensky and Vyksunsky districts to Avtozavodsky constituency, Bolsheboldinsky and Gaginsky districts – to Nizhny Novgorod constituency. This seat was instead stretched northwards to Nizhny Novgorod, gaining Dalnekonstantinovsky District and part of Bogorodsky District from the dissolved Dzerzhinsk constituency, Prioksky City District from Kstovo constituency and Leninsky City District from Avtozavodsky constituency.

== Members elected ==
| Election | Member | Party |
|---|---|---|
| 1993 | Sergey Voronov | Independent |
| 1995 | Ivan Nikitchuk | Communist Party |
| 1999 | Ivan Nikitchuk | Independent |
| 2003 | Anatoly Kozeradsky | United Russia |
| 2007 | Proportional representation - no election by constituency | |
| 2011 | Proportional representation - no election by constituency | |
| 2016 | Denis Moskvin | United Russia |
| 2021 | Yevgeny Lebedev | United Russia |
| 2026 | Yevgeny Kostin | United Russia |

== Election results ==
=== 1993 ===
Summary of the 12 December 1993 Russian legislative election in the Arzamas constituency
| Candidate | Party | Votes | % |
|---|---|---|---|
| Sergey Voronov | Independent | 49,070 | 17.94% |
| Boris Pevnitsky | Independent | 42,932 | 15.70% |
| Vladimir Zhukov | Independent | 37,973 | 13.88% |
| Bronislav Puchkov | Agrarian Party | 35,617 | 13.02% |
| Yury Belimov | Independent | 15,819 | 5.78% |
| Aleksandr Panteleyev | Democratic Party | 15,280 | 5.59% |
| Pyotr Tiflov | Independent | 11,212 | 4.10% |
| Valentin Kostin | Independent | 7,038 | 2.57% |
| Vladimir Kudryashov | Russian Democratic Reform Movement | 3,915 | 1.43% |
| against all | | 34,082 | 12.46% |
| Total | | 273,492 | 100% |

=== 1995 ===
Summary of the 17 December 1995 Russian legislative election in the Arzamas constituency
| Candidate | Party | Votes | % |
|---|---|---|---|
| Ivan Nikitchuk | Communist Party | 72,017 | 23.17% |
| Sergey Voronov (incumbent) | Independent | 59,649 | 19.19% |
| Vladimir Belozerov | Agrarian Party | 21,018 | 6.76% |
| Zoya Zaytseva | Party of Russian Unity and Accord | 17,320 | 5.57% |
| Genrikh Katrayev | Liberal Democratic Party | 16,191 | 5.21% |
| Sergey Naumov | Independent | 15,656 | 5.04% |
| Pyotr Khven | Pamfilova–Gurov–Lysenko | 15,221 | 4.90% |
| Boris Pevnitsky | Independent | 13,414 | 4.32% |
| Vladimir Savin | Independent | 13,243 | 4.26% |
| Aleksandr Kulagin | Derzhava | 12,982 | 4.18% |
| Yury Leonov | Independent | 8,806 | 2.83% |
| Mikhail Lemeshev | Power to the People | 6,385 | 2.05% |
| Anatoly Slyusarev | Congress of Russian Communities | 5,352 | 1.72% |
| Mikhail Yermakov | Independent | 4,604 | 1.48% |
| against all | | 21,671 | 6.97% |
| Total | | 310,842 | 100% |

=== 1999 ===
Summary of the 19 December 1999 Russian legislative election in the Arzamas constituency
| Candidate | Party | Votes | % |
|---|---|---|---|
| Ivan Nikitchuk (incumbent) | Independent | 83,607 | 30.04% |
| Boris Mokhov | Independent | 66,849 | 24.02% |
| Aleksandr Borodin | Independent | 27,060 | 9.72% |
| Yevgeny Anisimov | Independent | 23,962 | 8.61% |
| Yelena Naumova | Independent | 11,280 | 4.05% |
| Aleksandr Kurdyumov | Liberal Democratic Party | 9,051 | 3.25% |
| Boris Fedyakov | Independent | 7,941 | 2.85% |
| Nikolay Stadnikov | Andrey Nikolayev and Svyatoslav Fyodorov Bloc | 7,070 | 2.54% |
| Viktor Gamov | Communists and Workers of Russia - for the Soviet Union | 4,446 | 1.60% |
| Viktor Timin | Spiritual Heritage | 1,546 | 0.56% |
| against all | | 30,219 | 10.86% |
| Total | | 278,329 | 100% |

=== 2003 ===
Summary of the 7 December 2003 Russian legislative election in the Arzamas constituency
| Candidate | Party | Votes | % |
|---|---|---|---|
| Anatoly Kozeradsky | United Russia | 108,750 | 45.65% |
| Ivan Nikitchuk (incumbent) | Communist Party | 60,798 | 25.52% |
| Tatyana Shchavleva | Independent | 12,443 | 5.22% |
| Aleksandr Kochetkov | Liberal Democratic Party | 9,910 | 4.16% |
| Aleksandr Kulagin | United Russian Party Rus' | 6,535 | 2.74% |
| Yury Bardin | Independent | 5,307 | 2.23% |
| Boris Fedyakov | Independent | 4,031 | 1.69% |
| against all | | 26,867 | 11.28% |
| Total | | 238,325 | 100% |

=== 2016 ===
Summary of the 18 September 2016 Russian legislative election in the Prioksky constituency
| Candidate | Party | Votes | % |
|---|---|---|---|
| Denis Moskvin | United Russia | 172,119 | 63.42% |
| Pavel Belov | Liberal Democratic Party | 21,490 | 7.92% |
| Roman Fomin | Communist Party | 21,251 | 7.83% |
| Igor Bogdanov | A Just Russia | 19,786 | 7.29% |
| Svetlana Yudina | Communists of Russia | 8,745 | 3.22% |
| Mikhail Kuznetsov | Patriots of Russia | 5,822 | 2.15% |
| Aleksandr Tsapanov | Rodina | 4,376 | 1.61% |
| Irina Murakhtayeva | Yabloko | 3,468 | 1.28% |
| Anna Ludina | People's Freedom Party | 3,104 | 1.14% |
| Valeria Zaytseva | Civic Platform | 2,433 | 0.90% |
| Total | | 271,400 | 100% |

=== 2021 ===
Summary of the 17-19 September 2021 Russian legislative election in the Prioksky constituency
| Candidate | Party | Votes | % |
|---|---|---|---|
| Yevgeny Lebedev | United Russia | 148,620 | 52.93% |
| Mikhail Rykhtik | Communist Party | 41,062 | 14.62% |
| Anna Tatarintseva | A Just Russia — For Truth | 20,527 | 7.31% |
| Aleksandr Bykov | Party of Pensioners | 16,489 | 5.87% |
| Yulia Gusyakova | New People | 15,826 | 5.64% |
| Nikolay Chernyshov | Liberal Democratic Party | 14,280 | 5.09% |
| Igor Kuznetsov | Rodina | 11,335 | 4.04% |
| Valeria Viks | Party of Growth | 4,374 | 1.56% |
| Total | | 280,802 | 100% |

=== 2026 ===
Summary of the 18-20 September 2026 Russian legislative election in the Prioksky constituency
| Candidate | Party | Votes | % |
|---|---|---|---|
| Yevgeny Kostin | United Russia | 161,730 | 54.08% |
| Oleg Kiritsa | Communist Party | 38,405 | 12.84% |
| Irina Molkova | Liberal Democratic Party | 32,227 | 10.78% |
| Anna Tatarintseva | A Just Russia | 21,681 | 7.25% |
| Yevgeny Safonov | Party of Pensioners | 18,630 | 6.23% |
| Aleksey Groza | The Greens | 10,659 | 3.56% |
| Vadim Zaytsev | Rodina | 10,520 | 3.52% |
| Total | | 299,057 | 100% |
