= Koshelikha =

Koshelikha (Russian: Кошелиха) is the name of several rural localities (selos and villages) in Russia:

- Koshelikha, Nizhny Novgorod Oblast, a selo in Bolshemakatelemsky Selsoviet of Pervomaysky District of Nizhny Novgorod Oblast
- Koshelikha, Novgorod Oblast, a village in Bykovskoye Settlement of Pestovsky District of Novgorod Oblast
- Koshelikha, Vladimir Oblast, a village in Gorokhovetsky District of Vladimir Oblast
