= Buturlino =

Buturlino (Russian: Бутурлино) is the name of several inhabited localities in Russia.

Urban localities

- Buturlino, Nizhny Novgorod Oblast, a work settlement in Buturlinsky District of Nizhny Novgorod Oblast

Rural localities

- Buturlino, Moscow Oblast, a village in Dankovskoye Rural Settlement of Serpukhovsky District of Moscow Oblast
- Buturlino, Penza Oblast, a selo in Znamensko-Pestrovsky Selsoviet of Issinsky District of Penza Oblast
