= Vladimir Panov =

Russian politician (b. 1975)

- Владимир Панов
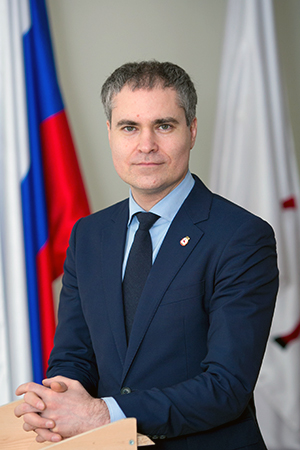

Mayor of Nizhny Novgorod
- In office 17 January 2018 – 6 May 2020
- Governor: Gleb Nikitin
- Preceded by: Elizaveta Solonchenko
- Succeeded by: Yury Shalabaev

Member of the State Duma for Nizhny Novgorod Oblast
- In office 5 October 2016 – 17 January 2018
- Preceded by: constituency re-established
- Succeeded by: Dmitri Svatkovskiy
- Constituency: Nizhny Novgorod (No. 129)

Personal details
- Born: 10 October 1975 (age 51) Gorky, Russian SFSR, USSR
- Party: United Russia
- Education: Lobachevsky State University of Nizhny Novgorod

Vladimir Alexandrovich Panov (Russian: Владимир Александрович Панов; born October 10, 1975) is a Russian politician. He is the former Mayor of Nizhny Novgorod and a member of the State Duma. He has also served as the deputy chairman of the State Duma Committee for the Environment and Environmental Protection, chairman of the Nizhny Novgorod regional branch of Support Russia and as a member of the General Council of United Russia.

== Biography ==
=== Education and professional activities ===
Panov graduated from school No. 40 in Nizhny Novgorod. In 1997, he graduated from the Faculty of Economics N. I. Lobachevsky State University of Nizhny Novgorod with a degree in Economics. The dissertation topic (2000) was related to his work in the non-state pension fund NORSI: "Management of the social and economic infrastructure of corporations: the example of pension funds".

From 2001 to 2004, he was an entrepreneur and was engaged in retail fashion. From 2014 to 2016, Panov was co-owner, executive director and chairman of the board of directors of CJSC "Kofebuk", providing services in the public catering sector.

Panov was the chairman of the board of directors of one of the largest mineral wool factories of Russia OJSC Minvata, as well as the owner of the network Milo Group includes a number of jewelry stores and fashion boutiques of world brands.

From 2006 to 2007, he was the head of the local self-government of the city of Kstovo, the chairman of the City Duma of the city of Kstovo I convocation and was in conflict with part of the deputy corps and the district executive power. In early 2017, through legal action by the administration of the Kstovo district, the Nizhny Novgorod regional court found unauthorized the composition of the Kstovo City Duma. Earlier in December 2006, four deputies of the Kstovo City Duma, announced their resignation and the City Council lost its quorum. For 12 months, it actually did not work as a result, and more than half of the deputies laid down their mandates in protest against Panov's policy as city head. In the early elections, on December 2, 2007, he was again elected to the City Duma of the city of Kstovo of the II convocation and was before expiry of office in 2010, but lost his chairmanship.

From 2007 to 2014, Panov served as chairman of the board of directors of LLC "Building Materials". From 2010 to 2015, he was deputy of the City Duma of Nizhny Novgorod V convocation. He was chairman of the permanent commission of the City Duma of Nizhny Novgorod on property and land relations. From 2010 to 2016, he was secretary of the CPSU VPP "United Russia" in the Moscow district of Nizhny Novgorod and in 2012 he co-founded LLC "Milk Kazan".

From 2015 to 2016, Panov was a deputy of the city Duma of the city of Nizhny Novgorod VI convocation, won the election with a result of about 53% of the vote in his district and since 2015 he's been chairman of the regional branch of LLC "Support of Russia"

=== Election to the State Duma ===
On September 18, 2016 Panov was elected to the State Duma of Russia for the Nizhny Novgorod region No. 129, garnering 46% of the vote (87.5 thousand voters), ahead of the candidate Communist Party of the Russian Federation Denis Voronenkov representing the voters of this district in the State Duma.

=== Career after elections to the State Duma ===
Panov has been a member of the General Council of the Party "United Russia" since 2017. In October 2017, the provisional acting governor of the Nizhny Novgorod region Gleb Nikitin nominated Vladimir Panov for the mayor of Nizhny Novgorod. The head of the region suggested the deputy State Duma of Panova in city-managers of Nizhny Novgorod

=== The Mayor of Nizhny Novgorod ===
On January 17, 2018, Panov was elected Mayor of Nizhny Novgorod. May 6, 2020 resigned due to increase. Deputies of the City Duma approved the resignation.

== Business Partners ==
The main business partner of State Duma deputy Panov is Mikhail Markevich. He is the director of the majority of LLC, the founder of which is Vladimir Panov. Among business partners was the owner of several premium restaurants Alexander Tabunshchikov and Businessman Eduard Nikitin was considered a business partner in Kazan. According to official reports, as of 2017, the most profitable enterprises owned by Vladimir Panov, LLC Milo / Gold, Soho Group LLC, CJSC Coffeehouse. According to the Seldon basis, as of October 2017, was a co-owner of 28 operating companies with revenues of more than 1 billion rubles by the end of 2016. In January 2018, on the eve of his election to the mayor of Nizhny Novgorod, Panov gave up controlling stakes in the companies, transferring his share to either a relative of Nina Panova, or to her long-time business partners Mikhail Markevich, Andrei Mironov and Eduard Nikitin.

== Legislative work ==
=== Animal Bills ===
In 2013, the secretary of the local branch of "United Russia" and deputy chairman of the Legislative Assembly, Alexander Tabachnikov instructed Panov to engage in the development of local zoo protection legislation. As a result, in 2015, the deputies adopted in the second final reading the law "On Neglected Animals" developed by Panov, which provided for the replacement of traditional irretrievable catch [] by an innovative OVSV method according to the Indian pattern: after sterilization dogs were released on the streets of Nizhny Novgorod for free living. The implementation of this method in practice caused a number of conflict situations related to the attack of sterilized dogs on citizens and the repeated occurrence of foci of rabies in the city in 2016.
