= Alexey Likhachev =

Russian official and manager

- Алексей Лихачёв
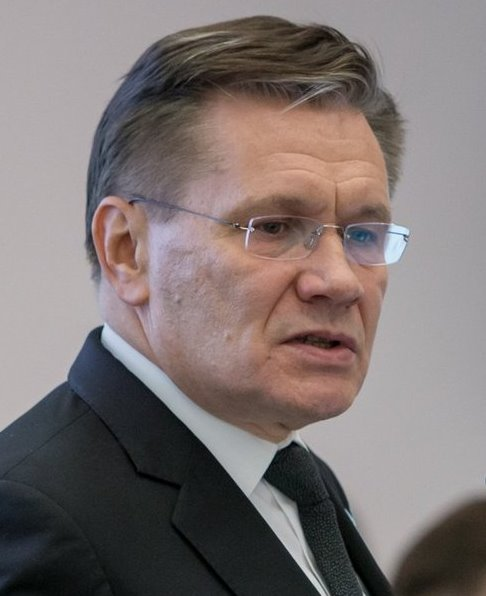
- Likhachyov in 2019

General Director of Rosatom State Corporation
- Incumbent
- Assumed office 5 October 2016
- Preceded by: Sergey Kiriyenko

Personal details
- Born: 23 December 1962 (age 63) Sarov, Russian SFSR, Soviet Union
- Party: United Russia
- Other political affiliations: Union of Right Forces
- Education: Gorky State University

Alexey Evgenievich Likhachev (Russian: Алексей Евгеньевич Лихачёв; born December 23, 1962, Sarov) is a Russian official and manager who is serving as the Director General of the State Atomic Energy Corporation Rosatom since 2016.

== Biography ==
Born on December 23, 1962 in Sarov (Arzamas-75).

In 1985, he graduated from the Radiophysics Department of the Gorky State University. In 1998, he graduated from the economics department of the same university.

In 1999, he defended his PhD thesis on "Investment Management in the Context of Formation of Market Relations" at the Nizhny Novgorod State University.

He has a Doctor of Economics degree. In 2006, he defended his doctoral thesis on "Economic Diplomacy of Russia in the Context of Globalization" at the All-Russian Academy of Foreign Trade.

In 1985-1987, he worked as an engineer at the Gorky Research Instrument-Making Institute. He was engaged in social and political activities. In 1987-1988 he was the secretary of the Komsomol committee of the Gorky Scientific Research Instrument-Making Institute, in 1988-1992 he served in the Gorky city committee of the Komsomol.

In 1992-2000, Likhachev was the manager of the Nizhny Novgorod social and industrial insurance company "Aval"; deputy of the city Council of People's Deputies of the city of Nizhny Novgorod; advisor to the governor B. E. Nemtsov on insurance and investment issues.

In 1997-2000 he served as deputy of the City Duma of Nizhny Novgorod. On May 31, 2000, Sergei Kiriyenko's parliamentary powers in the State Duma were prematurely terminated due to his appointment as the Presidential Plenipotentiary Representative of the Russian Federation in the Volga Federal District, and on June 23, 2000, his parliamentary mandate was transferred to Alexei Likhachev (the first such case in the history of the State Duma).

Since 2000, he was co-chairman of the Nizhny Novgorod regional branch of the Union of Right Forces party, and was a deputy of the State Duma of the 3rd and 4th convocations. Until 2007, he was a member of the Union of Right Forces, even being part of the United Russia faction, and was a member of the Russia-European Union Parliamentary Cooperation Committee. In January 2004, he was elected to the federal political council of the Union of Right Forces. In July 2007, he joined United Russia.

During the 2000 presidential elections, he was the authorized representative for the election campaign of candidate Vladimir Putin in the Nizhny Novgorod Oblast.

In the 2003 parliamentary election, he participated in the elections to the State Duma in a single-mandate constituency from the Union of Right Forces and won, gaining 34.94% (76,187 votes), becoming one of three party members elected to the new convocation. In the 4th convocation, he was deputy chairman of the State Duma Committee on Economic Policy, Entrepreneurship and Tourism under Valery Draganov. He voted for the abolition of direct gubernatorial elections, citing the fact that “before 1995, governors were appointed (by President Boris Yeltsin) and nothing terrible happened”.

He was a member of the negotiating team on the issue of Russia's accession to the WTO.

In 2005, as the leader of the Nizhny Novgorod branch of Union of Right Forces, he achieved the unification of the party's efforts in the municipal elections with the Nizhny Novgorod branch of Yabloko.

He announced the possibility of running for mayor of Nizhny Novgorod in the 2006 elections, but later declined in favour of the candidate from United Russia, Vadim Bulavinov.

In 2007-2008 he served as adviser to the Minister of Economic Development of the Russian Federation. In 2008-2010 he served as director of the Consolidated Department for Analysis and Regulation of Foreign Economic Activity of the Ministry of Economic Development of the Russian Federation. In 2010-2015, he worked as Deputy Minister of Economic Development of the Russian Federation.

Since February 13, 2015 he served as First Deputy Minister of Economic Development of the Russian Federation. Since October 5, 2016 he served as Head of the State Atomic Energy Corporation Rosatom.

Alexey Likhachev's declared annual income for 2015 was 8.2 million rubles.

In the TV game "What? Where? When?" he defended the interests of experts as a representative of Rosatom.

On March 4, 2022, against the backdrop of the Russian invasion of Ukraine, Likhachev officially addressed workers in the nuclear industry with a call to ensure the smooth operation of all enterprises and fulfill all obligations to customers, despite the difficult situation "in which our country and the whole world have found themselves in recent days." Likhachev also asked to take care of their physical and emotional health, to pay primary attention to the person and wished them "strength, endurance, confidence and peace of mind. And most importantly, a peaceful sky.".

On February 24, 2023, amid Russia's invasion of Ukraine, Likhachev was added to the UK sanctions list "because he was and is involved in benefiting from or supporting the government". On May 24, 2022, he was sanctioned by Ukraine because he "sent Rosatom specialists to Ukraine along with Russian military personnel who seized Ukrainian nuclear power plants, Zaporizhzhia Nuclear Power Plant and Chernobyl Nuclear Power Plant". On May 19, 2023, he was included in Canada's sanctions list of "close associates of the regime". For similar reasons, he is under sanctions by New Zealand and Australia.

In January 2025, he was included in the US sanctions lists. He is married and has three sons. His eldest son graduated from university and works at the Gidromash enterprise. The middle son works at the Academy of Foreign Trade. The youngest son studied the Nizhny Novgorod branch of the Higher School of Economics.

== Awards ==
- Gratitude from the President of the Russian Federation (2008)
- Order of Friendship (2010).
- Russian Federation Presidential Certificate of Honour (January 19, 2013) — for active participation in the negotiation process on the accession of the Russian Federation to the World Trade Organization.
- Gratitude from the President of the Russian Federation (2014)
- Medal "For Contribution to the Creation of the Eurasian Economic Union", 1st degree (May 8, 2015).
- Medal "For Contribution to the Development of the Eurasian Economic Union" (May 29, 2019).
- Order of Honour (2015).
- Order "For Merit to the Fatherland", 4th degree (2020)
- Medal "For Merit to the Republic of Karelia" (June 8, 2020) - for services to the Republic of Karelia and its residents, a major contribution to the socio-economic development of the republic and active work as part of the State Commission for the preparation for the celebration of the 100th anniversary of the formation of the Republic of Karelia.'
- Jubilee medal "In memory of the 800th anniversary of Nizhny Novgorod" (2021).
- Order of St. Seraphim of Sarov, 2nd degree (Russian Orthodox Church, 2021) - for a significant contribution to the development of church-state relations.
- Honorary Citizen of Nizhny Novgorod (2023).
- Order of Honor (Belarus, March 21, 2024) — for conscientious fruitful work, high professionalism, significant contribution to the implementation of the investment project for the construction of the Belarusian Nuclear Power Plant.
- Gratitude from the Government of the Russian Federation (October 2, 2024) — for a major contribution to the preparation and holding of the III International Construction Championship in St. Petersburg in 2023.
