= City Duma (disambiguation) =

A city duma is a city-level legislature in Russia.

City Duma may also refer to:

- City Duma of Nizhny Novgorod, the municipal legislative body in Nizhny Novgorod.
- Saint Petersburg City Duma, the municipal legislative body in Saint Petersburg.
- Moscow City Duma, the municipal legislative body in Moscow.
