= Ivan Karnilin =

Russian politician

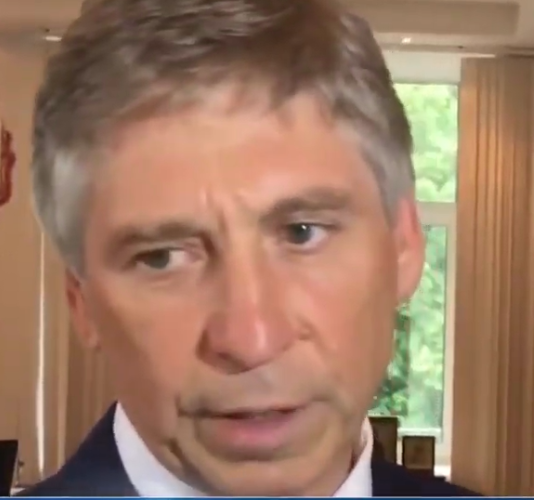

Head of Nizhny Novgorod
- In office 7 October 2015 – 24 May 2017
- Preceded by: Oleg Sorokin
- Succeeded by: Elizaveta Solonchenko

Personal details
- Born: Ivan Nikolaevich Karnilin; 17 January 1957 (age 69) Krasnoye, Sechenovsky District Gorky Oblast, Russian SFSR, Soviet Union
- Citizenship: Russia
- Education: Gorky Polytechnic Institute
- Known for: Mayor of Nizhny Novgorod

Ivan Nikolayevich Karnilin (Russian: Иван Николаевич Карнилин, born 17 January 1957) is a Russian politician. He served as head of Nizhny Novgorod.

== Early life ==
Ivan Nikolayevich Karnilin was born in the village of Krasnoye, Sechenovsky District, Gorky Oblast.

He worked at Gorky Automobile Plant as a stamp repair mechanic.

In the spring of 1975 he was drafted into the army, where he served in the communications troops.

== Career ==
In 1978, he began working at the Teploobmennik plant as a technologist and head of tool shop 42. From 1980 to 1985, he served as the First Secretary of the Komsomol Committee of the Teploobmennik Plant. In 1980, he joined the Communist Party of the Soviet Union. In 1982, he graduated from Gorky Polytechnic Institute with a degree in mechanical engineering. From 1985 to 1987, he worked as Head of Department and Head of Tool Shop at the Teploobmennik plant. From 1987 to 1994, he served as deputy chairman of the Leninsky District Executive Committee and deputy head of the Leninsky District Administration.

From 2010 to 2015, he was Deputy General Director of TekhnoMashHolding CJSC. The company closed in 2013 with a loss of 159.6 million rubles. However, it became profitable in 2014.

In 2014, as a city council member, Karnilin declared income in the amount of 788,500 rubles from TekhnoMashHolding CJSC, the city council, and VIKA LLC. His property list included two land plots in the Gorodetsky and Kstovsky districts (916m^{2}, 1,977m^{2}), 1/4 share in the right to an apartment (287.5m^{2}), a residential building (120.7m^{2}), and a Toyota Land Cruiser 200. Karnilin, together with his brothers Vladimir and Igor Korolev, were co-owners of VIKA LLC and the Aleksandrovsky Sad hotel complex at the St. George's Congress in Nizhny Novgorod. The organization's net profit for 2015 was 1.4 million rubles. Nizhny Novgorod Insurance Company Granit LLC was excluded from incorporation on 11 August 2016.

=== Political activity ===
In 1994, he was elected a deputy of the Nizhny Novgorod City Duma. From 1994 to 2010, he was chairman of the Nizhny Novgorod City Duma. In 2010, he was re-elected to the City Duma, where he worked as part of the standing commission on budget, financial, and tax policy.

From 7 October 2015 to 23 May 2017, he was head of Nizhny Novgorod. On 23 May 2017, he wrote a statement asking to be dismissed from the post. On 24 May, the resignation was accepted by the deputies of the Nizhny Novgorod City Duma.

== Family ==
He was married to Albina Karnilina, with whom he had a daughter, Irina Ovchinnikova (Karnilina), and a son, Nikolay Karnilin. They have been divorced since March 2015.

== Scandals ==
In December 2016, opposition leader Alexei Navalny published a video of his investigation into Ivan Karnilin. In the video, Navalny revealed that Karnilin's wife purchased two apartments in Miami in 2013 and 2014 for a total amount of almost US$2 million.
