= Elizaveta Solonchenko =

Russian politician

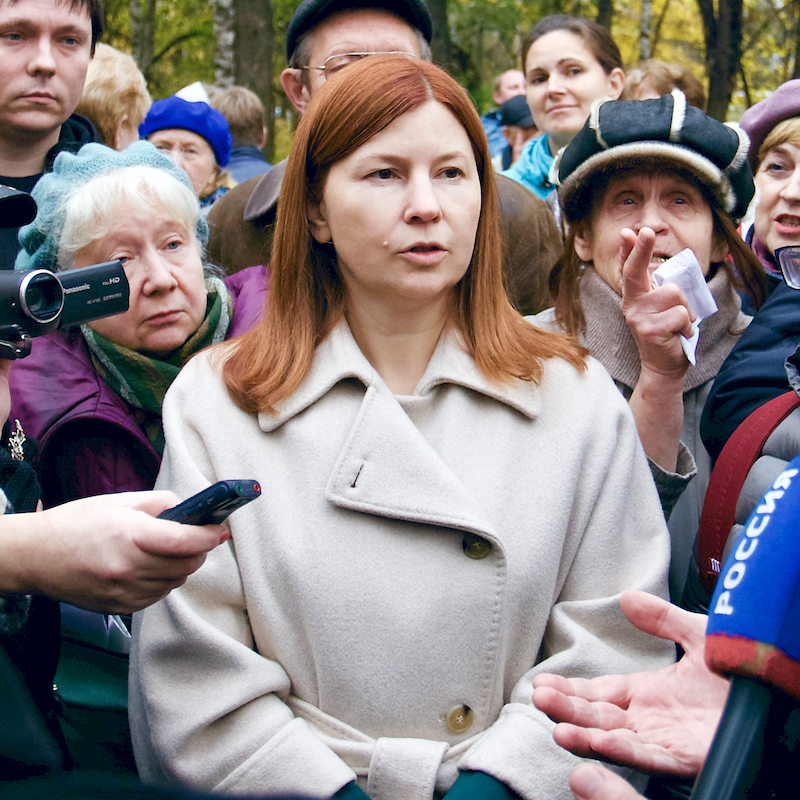

Deputy Chairman of City Duma of Nizhny Novgorod
- In office 21 February 2018 – 26 December 2018

Acting Deputy Chairman of City Duma of Nizhny Novgorod
- In office 20 December 2017 – 21 February 2018

Head of Nizhny Novgorod
- In office 21 June 2017 – 20 December 2017
- Preceded by: Ivan Karnilin
- Succeeded by: Vladimir Panov

Personal details
- Born: 15 March 1972 (age 54) Nizhny Novgorod, Russia
- Children: Daughter Mila and son Savva
- Education: N. I. Lobachevsky State University of Nizhny Novgorod

Elizaveta Solonchenko (Russian: Елизавета Игоревна Солонченко, born 15 March 1972 in Nizhny Novgorod) is a Russian politician who served as the Head of Nizhny Novgorod (2017), Deputy Head of Nizhny Novgorod (2013–2017), Deputy Chairman of the City Duma of Nizhny Novgorod (2013–2015, 2018). She has been critical of the federal government.

== Education ==
Elizaveta Solonchenko received a degree in applied mathematics from the Department of Computational Mathematics and Cybernetics at the Lobachevsky State University of Nizhny Novgorod. In 2005, Solonchenko also graduated from the Higher School of Economics in Moscow where she received a Master of Business Administration degree.

== Career ==
Solonchenko worked as a Commercial director at the "VKT" food distribution company until 2002, when she was promoted to CEO, a role she held until 2012.

А member of the City Duma of Nizhny Novgorod IV (2005–2010), V (2010–2015) and VI (2015–2020) convocations.

On 26 June 2013, Solonchenko was elected the second Deputy Head of Nizhny Novgorod, and on 7 October 2015, she was re-elected Deputy Head of Nizhny Novgorod.

On 21 June 2017, at the session of the City Duma of Nizhny Novgorod, Solonchenko was unanimously elected the Head of the city.

Solonchenko created and introduced a three-year support program for small and medium-sized businesses as a result of her meeting with the entrepreneurs in the summer of 2017. Solonchenko also prevented the real estate developments in Svetloyarskoe lake park, responding to the petition from the citizens, as well as terminated real estate development auctions on Slavyanskaya and Studyonaya streets. The buildings there became objects of cultural heritage in April 2018.

Solonchenko was a Deputy Chairman of the Nizhny Novgorod City Duma from 21 February to 26 December 2018.

She early resigned as a member of Nizhny Novgorod City Duma 26 December 2018.

=== Political persecution ===
In May 2020, Solonchenko was arrested ad absentia under the accusation of bribery by the Moskovsky District Court of Nizhny Novgorod. Political analysts consider this case political persecution since the federal center has been against appointing her the Head of the city from the beginning. Local publications claimed that she was acting in the interests of the city, and not in the interests of the federal authorities.

The prosecution claims she was affiliated with the United Сenter for Municipal Order, an organization providing food for schools, which became a monopolist in its field. On 13 December 2018, anonymous bloggers reported that her home was inspected, but Solonchenko claimed it was a fake. In May 2020, she was accused of accepting bribes during the period from 2013 to 2018, which amounted to about 80 million rubles, and announced for international search. Solonchenko rejects the accusations and claims that she will keep defending her innocence.

== Projects ==
In 2012, Solonchenko put forward the initiative to create the Youth Chamber at the City Duma of Nizhny Novgorod. Events within the Youth Chamber were carried out with the attracted sponsorship money and did not require budget funds.

Another notable event – the annual sports, healthy lifestyle, and family leisure festival ‘Sports Heritage’ in Nizhny Novgorod.

In 2017, Solonchenko initiated the establishment of the Public Chamber of Nizhny Novgorod. The intention was to organize a social formation under the authority, the creation of which would be initiated by civil society, rather than by the officials. In March 2017, at the "Living Nizhny" forum, the participants proposed to create a new discussion platform at the Nizhny Novgorod City Duma. The idea was that the Public Chamber would bring together the most active representatives of civil society. There were over 400 candidates who took part in the election session summer 2017.

Solonchenko supported the citizens’ proposal to put up a memorial plaque commemorating assassinated opposition leader Boris Nemtsov, who was also the first governor of the Nizhny Novgorod region.

== Social initiatives ==
Solonchenko has been supporting the "Radiance" Innovation Centre for children and adults with Down syndrome since 2014. She also provided financial and organizational support for the "Piano" theatre for deaf children.

Solonchenko launched the non-profit educational project "Academium" in partnership with the Russian Academy of Sciences.

== Personal life ==
Solonchenko is married and has two children – daughter Mila and son Savva. The family currently lives in the United Kingdom.
