= Vorotynets =

Vorotynets Воротынец
- Urban-type settlement
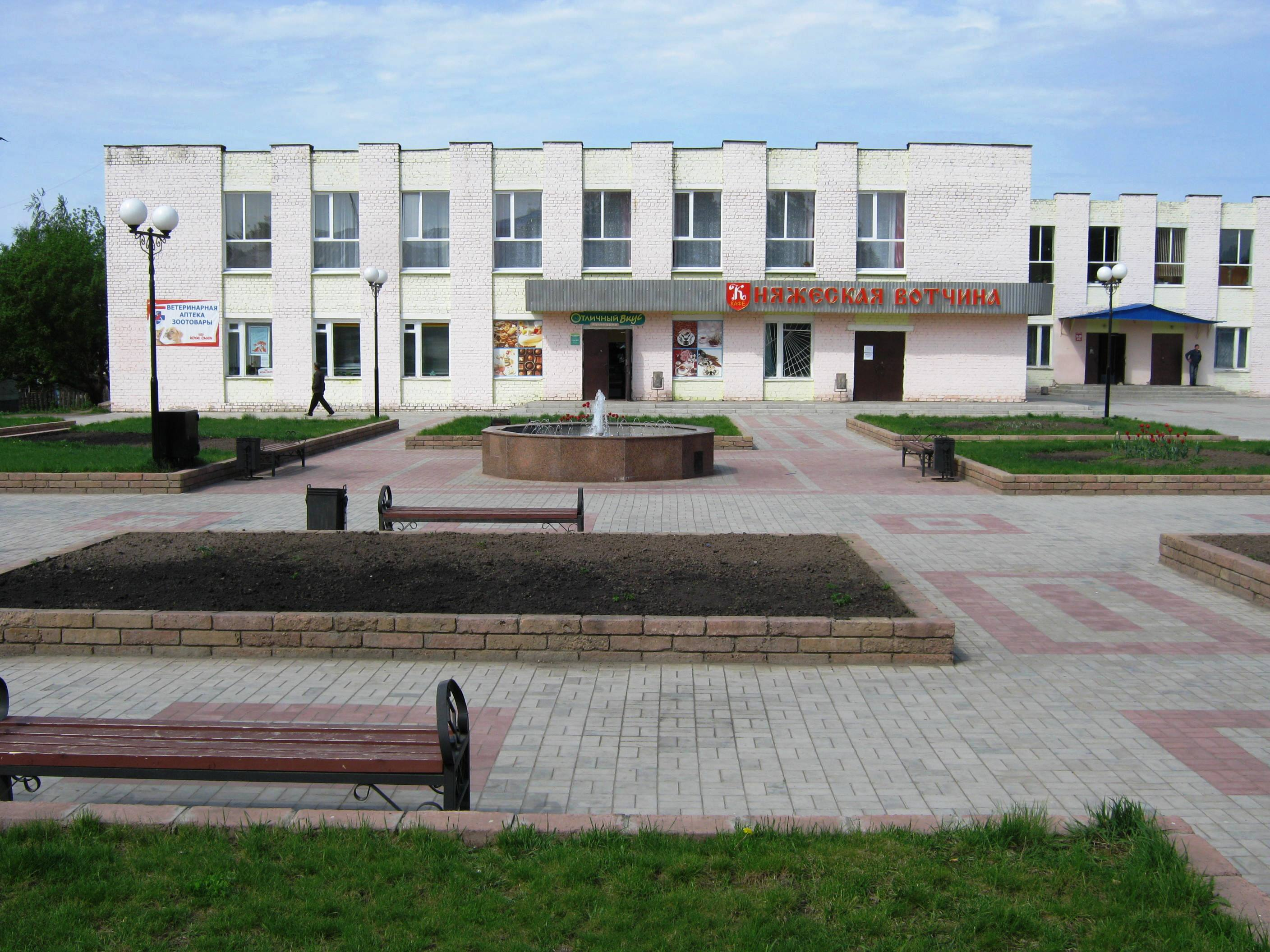

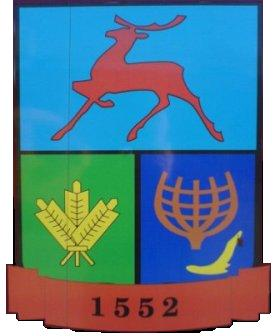
- Coat of arms
- Interactive map of Vorotynets
- Location of Vorotynets Vorotynets (Nizhny Novgorod Oblast)
- Coordinates: 56.0600°N 45.8630°E
- Country: Russia
- Federal subject: Nizhny Novgorod Oblast
- Administrative district: Vorotynsky District
- Founded: 1552 (Julian)

Population (2010 Census)
  - Total: 6,451
  - Estimate (2025): 5,656 (−12.3%)
- Time zone: UTC+3 (MSK)
- Postal code: 606260
- OKTMO ID: 22621151051

Vorotynets (Russian: Вороты́нец) is an urban locality (an urban-type settlement), in Vorotynsky District of Nizhny Novgorod Oblast, Russia.

== Population ==
Population:

6,451 (2010 census);[1] 6,719 (2002 census);[4] 7,006 (1989 Soviet census).[5]
