= Anatoly Lesun =

Russian politician

- Анатолий Лесун
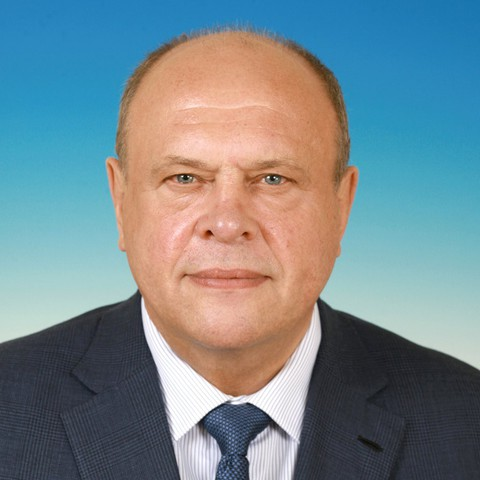
- official portrait, circa 2021

Member of the State Duma for Nizhny Novgorod Oblast
- Incumbent
- Assumed office 12 October 2021
- Preceded by: Dmitry Svatkovsky
- Constituency: Nizhny Novgorod (No. 129)

Personal details
- Born: 27 February 1959 (age 67) Parichi, Svietlahorsk District, Byelorussian SSR, USSR
- Party: United Russia
- Education: Belarusian Institute of Railway Engineers

Anatoly Lesun (Russian: Анатолий Федорович Лесун, born 27 February 1959 in Parichi, Svietlahorsk District) is a Russian political figure and a deputy of the 8th State Duma. In 2010, he was granted a Doctor of Sciences in Technical sciences degree.

From 1993 to 1998, Lesun worked at the Kirov branch of the Gorky Railway, first as the deputy head and, later, as the head. In 1998, he was appointed the head of the Kirov representative office of the Gorky Railway. In 2009-2021, Lesun served as the head of the Gorky Railway. On 13 March 2011 Lesun was elected deputy of the Legislative Assembly of Nizhny Novgorod Oblast. Since September 2021, he has served as deputy of the 8th State Duma.
