= Ivan Nikitchuk =

Russian politician (1944–2023)

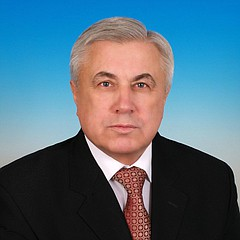

Member of the State Duma
- In office 21 December 2011 – 5 October 2016
- Constituency: proportional representation
- In office 17 December 1995 – 29 December 2003
- Preceded by: Sergey Voronov
- Succeeded by: Anatoly Kozeradsky
- Constituency: Prioksky

Personal details
- Born: Ivan Ignatyevich Nikitchuk; 21 May 1944 Triskyni, Sarnensky District, Rivne Oblast, Ukrainian SSR, USSR
- Died: 4 October 2023 (aged 79)
- Party: CPRF
- Education: Kharkov Aviation Institute
- Occupation: Engineer

Ivan Ignatyevich Nikitchuk (Russian: Иван Игнатьевич Никитчук; 21 May 1944 – 4 October 2023) was a Russian engineer and politician. A member of the Communist Party of the Russian Federation, he served in the State Duma from 1995 to 2003 and again from 2011 to 2016.

Nikitchuk died on 4 October 2023, at the age of 79.
