= Mayor of Nizhny Novgorod =

Political role in Central Russia

- Coat of arms of Nizhny Novgorod

- Flag of Nizhny Novgorod

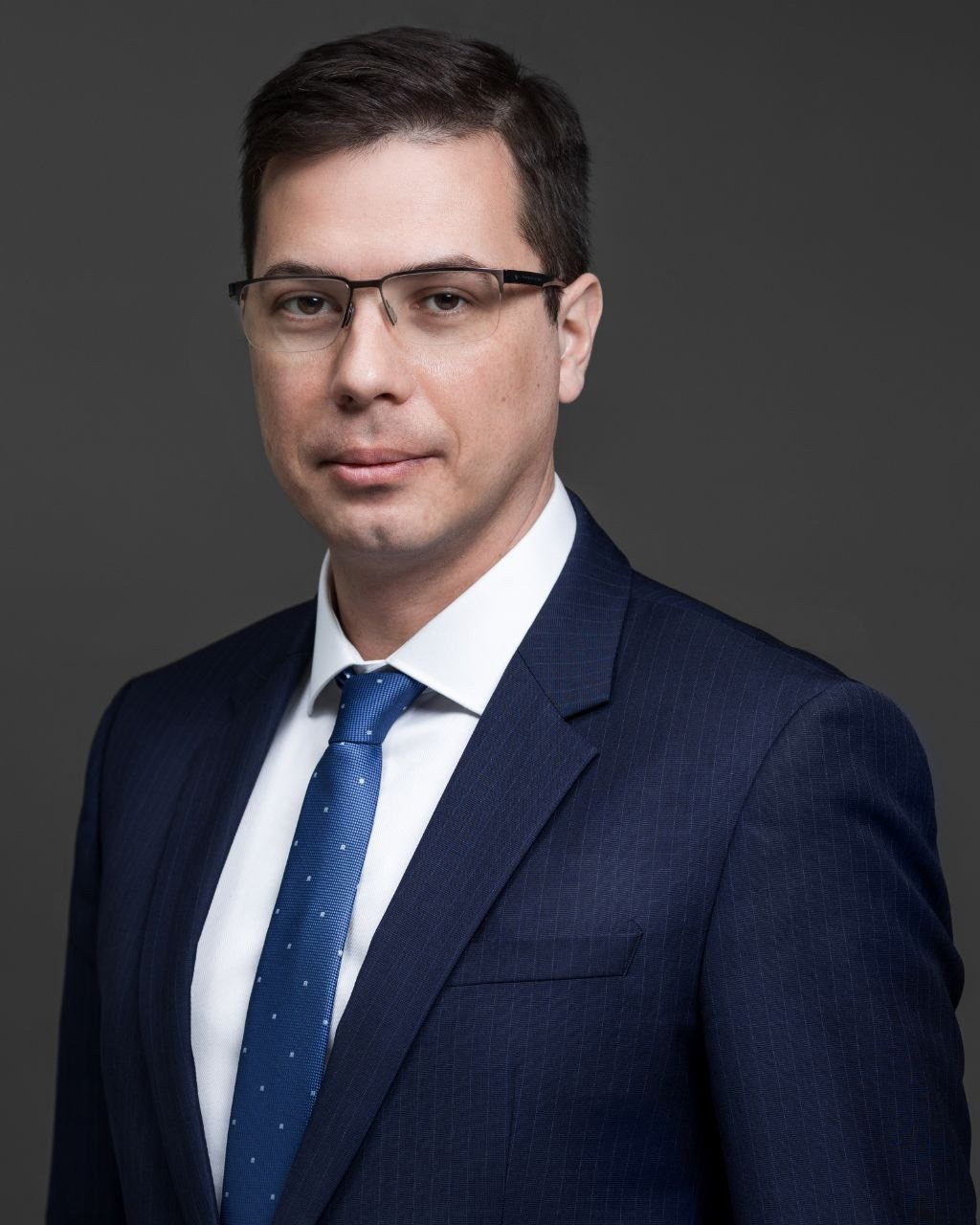
- Incumbent; Yury Shalabayev since 6 May 2020
- Style: His Excellency (formal); Mr. Mayor (informal)
- Residence: Nizhny Novgorod Kremlin 5, Nizhny Novgorod
- Term length: 5 years
- Inaugural holder: Dmitry Bednyakov
- Formation: 12 December 1991
- Succession: Deputy Mayor
- Salary: $230,000
- Website: Office of the Mayor

The Mayor of Nizhny Novgorod is head of the executive branch of the political system in Nizhny Novgorod, the Administration of Nizhny Novgorod. Since May 6, 2020 the position is occupied by Yury Shalabayev.

The mayor is not elected by popular vote, but appointed as a result of the closed vote of city council deputies.

From 1991 to 2010, there was a single-headed system of legislative and executive power. From 2010 to 2017, city government was divided between two positions - the head of the city, who led the City Duma, and the head of the city administration (city manager).

On October 26, 2017, a law was approved to return the one-head system, in which the mayor of the city is also vested with the powers of the head of administration. In December 2017, a return to this management system began. The post of Chairman of the City Duma, abolished in 2010, was restored.

There are no direct elections for the mayor of the city. He is appointed by the decision of the City Duma, during a closed vote of deputies.

During the Russian Tsardom, the position of mayor was called zemsky headman. One of the most famous was Kuzma Minin during the Time of Troubles.

== Mayors according to the City Regulations of 1785 ==
Years	Mayor
1786—1788	Ivan Bryzgalov
1789—1791	Ivan Yurin
1792—1794	Semyon Loshkarev
1795—1797	Alexey Borodin
1798—1800	Ivan Kostromin
1801—1803	Nikolai Khalezov
1804—1806	Ivan Bryzgalov
1807	Alexey Borodin
1808—1809	Semyon Loshkarev
1810—1812	Pyotr Kamenev
1813—1815	Mikhail Yesyrev
1816—1818	Fedor Pereplyotchikov
1819—1821	Fedor Schukin
1822—1824	Ivan Pyatov
1825—1827	Fedor Pereplyotchikov
1828—1830	Mikhail Klimov
1831—1833	Pyotr Kosarev
1834—1836	Fedor Pereplyotchikov
1837—1839	Mikhail Klimov
1840—1842	Ivan Pyatov
1843—1845	Vasily Galkin
1846—1848	Semyon Pyatov
1849—1851	Dmitry Klimov
1852—1854	Vasily Michurin
1855—1857	Dmitry Klimov
1858—1860	Theophylact Pyatov
1861—1863	Mikhail Burmistrov
1864—1866	Vasily Michurin
1867—1869	Ivan Kvartalov

== Mayors according to the City Regulations of 1870 ==
Years	Mayor
1870—1878	Alexey Gubin
21.12.1878—19.10.1879	Ivan Zurov
.12.1879—26.07.1888	Vasily Sobolev
1888—13.04.1893	Alexey Gubin

== Mayors according to the City Regulations of 1892 ==
Years	Mayor
1893—1896	Dmitry Delvig
.02.1897—1909	Alexander Memorsky
16.02.1909—1910	Vladimir Gorinov
1911—1913	Ivan Bogoyavlensky
1913—1917	Dmitry Sirotkin
1917	Vladimir Ganchel

== Chairmen of the Executive Committee of the City Council of People's Deputies of the CPSU (1918-1991) ==
Years	Mayor
1918	Solomon Levit
1918—1919	Nikolai Kozitsky
1919—1920	Stepan Kuznetsov
1920—1923	Ter Mushek
1923—1925	Alexander Muralov
1925—1926	Grigory Amosov
1927—1929	Ivan Kolpakov
1929—1930	Klavdiya Zimina
1930—1931	Andrey Kolochkov
1931—1934	Alexei Grachev
1934—1937	Rodion Semyonov
1937—1938	Vasily Boronin
1938—1941	Alexander Efimov
1941—1943	Mikhail Sukhanov
1943—1950	Alexander Shulpin
1950	Nikolai Kochetkov
1951—1967	Alexei Proskurin
1967—1974	Alexander Sokolov
1975—1985	Vladimir Erekhinskiy
1985—1988	Yuri Marchenkov
1988—1990	Vladimir Bodyakshin
1990—1991	Omari Sharadze

== Mayors of the city in Russian Federation ==
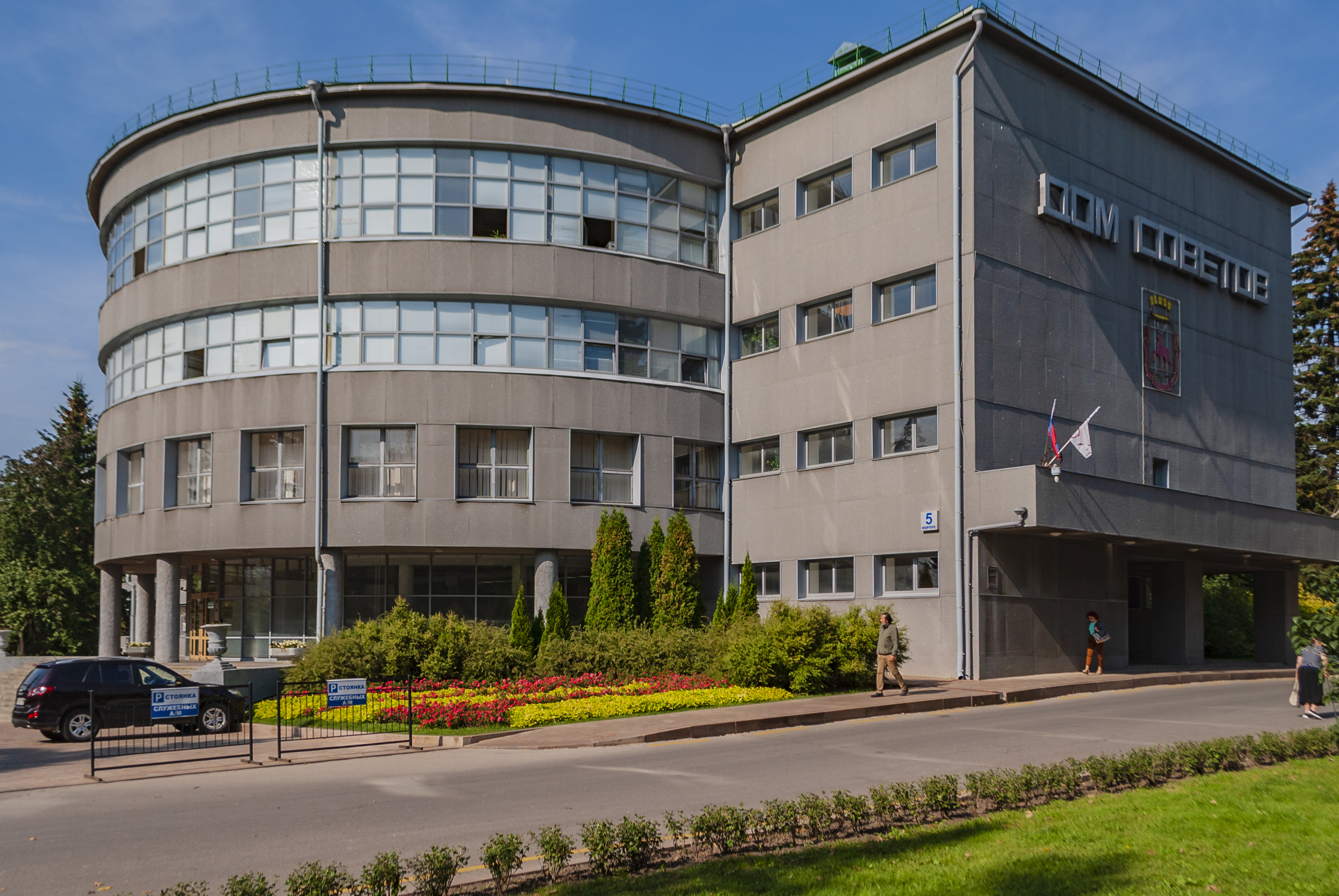
House of City Duma and City Administration in Nizhny Novgorod Kremlin built in constructivist style

Mayor		Party (Note: During their term)	Term	Notes
1	Dmitry Bednyakov	Unaffiliated	26 December 1991 — 29 March 1994	Dismissed by president Yeltsin
2	Ivan Sklyarov	No data	1 April 1994 — June 1997	Became 2nd Governor of Nizhny Novgorod Oblast (13 July 1997 – 5 August 2001)
—	Vladimir Gorin	Unaffiliated	June 1997 — 29 March 1998	Acting mayor
—	Alexander Meleshkin	CPSU	29 March 1998 — 10 October 1998	Acting mayor
3	Yury Lebedev (politician)	No data (Note: Now United Russia)	10 October 1998 — 29 September 2002	
4	Vadim Bulavinov	United Russia (Note: Since 2004)	29 September 2002 — 25 October 2010	Last mayor to be elected by popular vote
In 2010–2017, the city administration was divided between two positions: the Head of the city (mayor), who was in charge of the City Duma, and the Head of the city administration (city manager).
5	Oleg Sorokin	United Russia	25 October 2010 — 7 October 2015	Was arrested in December 2017 for large bribery and sentenced for 10 years on 7 March 2019
6	Ivan Karnilin	United Russia	7 October 2015 — 24 May 2017	
7	Elizaveta Solonchenko	United Russia	21 June 2017 — 20 December 2017	Arrested in absentia on 29 May 2020 for bribery. Now lives in Great Britain
On 26 October 2017, a law was approved on the return of the "one-headed" system, in which the mayor chairs the city administration.
8	Vladimir Panov	United Russia	17 January 2018 — 6 May 2020	Voluntary resigned
—	Yury Shalabayev	United Russia	6 May 2020 — 28 October 2020	Acting mayor
9	Yury Shalabayev	United Russia	28 October 2020 — incumbent	

== Head of the city administration (2010 – 2017) ==
Mayor		Party (Note: During their term)	Term	Notes
1	Oleg Kondrashev	United Russia	3 December 2010 — 22 July 2015	Arrested in absentia for bribery in 2019. Now lives in USA
3	Andrey Chertkov	United Russia	22 July 2015 — 23 December 2015	Acting head
2	Sergey Belov (politician)	United Russia	24 December 2015 — 18 October 2017	
4	Natalia Kazachkova	United Russia	18 October 2017 — 17 January 2017	Acting head
