= Yevgeny Lebedev (politician) =

Russian politician

- Евгений Лебедев
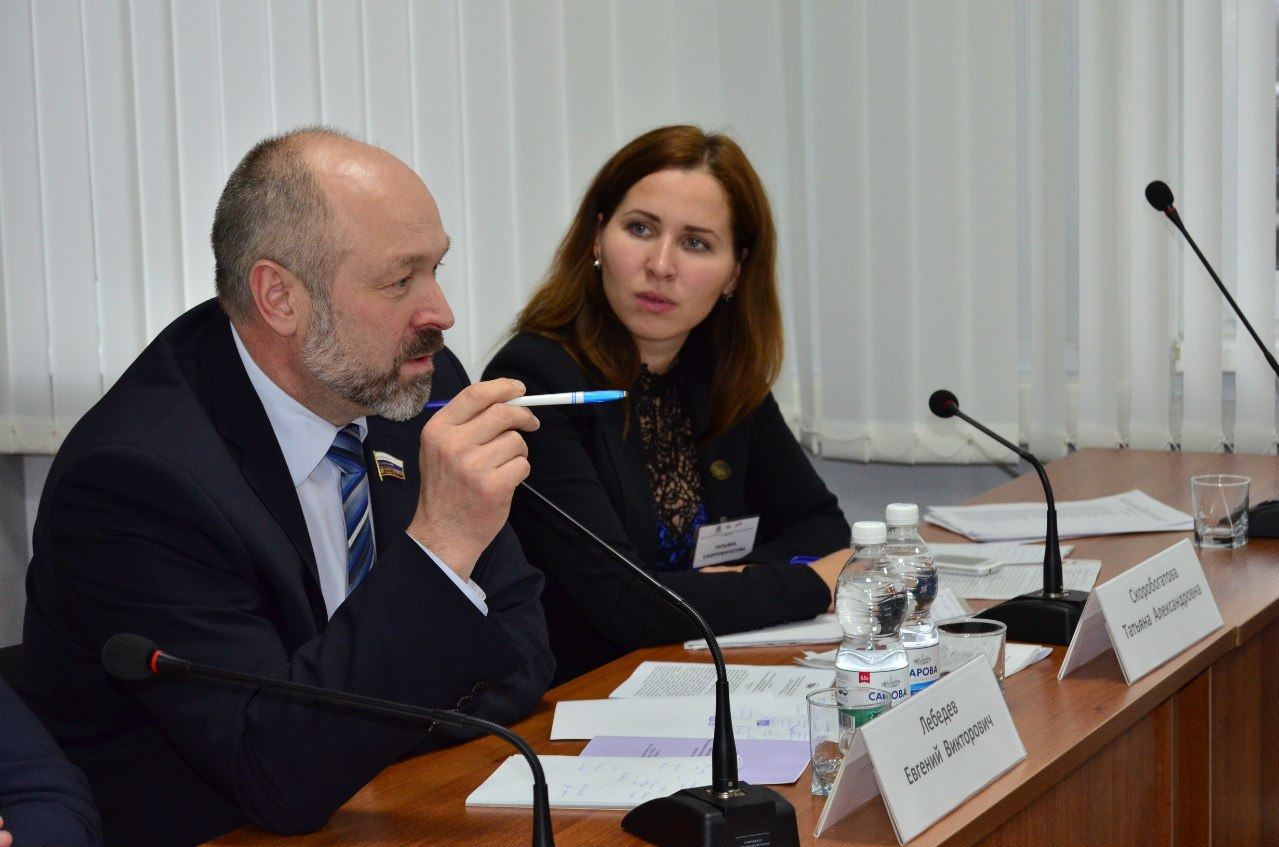
- Lebedev (left) with Tatyana Skorobogatova (circa 2014)

Member of the State Duma for Nizhny Novgorod Oblast
- Incumbent
- Assumed office 12 October 2021
- Preceded by: Denis Moskvin
- Constituency: Prioksky (No. 130)

Personal details
- Born: 12 December 1957 (age 68) Bor, Nizhny Novgorod Oblast, Russian SFSR, USSR
- Party: United Russia
- Education: N. I. Lobachevsky State University of Nizhny Novgorod

Evgeny Victorovich Lebedev (Russian: Евгений Викторович Лебедев, born 12 December 1957 in Bor, Nizhny Novgorod Oblast) is a Russian political figure and a deputy of the 7th and 8th State Dumas.

From 1978 to 2002, Lebedev worked at the Bor glass factory as a driver, commodity specialist, deputy head of the supply department, head of the supply department, deputy director for commercial issues, deputy general director for marketing and commerce. In 2005-2006, he was the deputy of the Bor City Duma. From 2006 to 2021, he was the deputy of the Legislative Assembly of Nizhny Novgorod Oblast of the 4th-6th convocations. Since September 2021, he has served as deputy of the 8th State Duma.
