= Dmitri Svatkovskiy =

Russian modern pentathlete

Dmitriy Svatkovskiy
- Дмитрий Сватковский
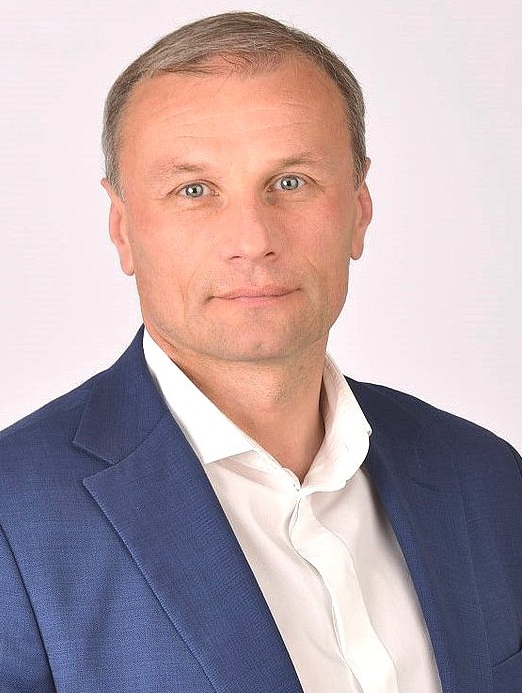

Member of the State Duma for Nizhny Novgorod Oblast
- In office 25 September 2018 – 12 October 2021
- Preceded by: Vladimir Panov
- Succeeded by: Anatoly Lesun
- Constituency: Nizhny Novgorod (No. 129)

Personal details
- Born: 27 November 1971 (age 54) Moscow, RSFSR, USSR
- Party: United Russia
- Spouse(s): Oksana Skaldina (divorced) Lyubov Ryabova
- Children: Daria; Adele
- Education: Moscow State Academy of Physical Culture; RANEPA
- Occupation: sports organiser
- Sports career
- Height: 188 cm (6 ft 2 in)
- Weight: 79 kg (174 lb)
- Country: Russia
- Sport: Modern Pentathlon
- Retired: 2000
Medal record
Modern pentathlon
Olympic Games
Representing Unified Team
Silver medal – second place	1992 Barcelona	Men's Team
Representing Russia
Gold medal – first place	2000 Sydney	Men's Individual

Dmitriy Valerievich Svatkovskiy (Russian: Дмитрий Валерьевич Сватковский; born 27 November 1971) is a Russian modern pentathlete, Olympic champion and politician.

== Olympics ==
Svatkovskiy competed for Russia at the 2000 Summer Olympics in Sydney, where he won an individual gold medal. He won a team silver medal with the Unified team at the 1992 Summer Olympics in Barcelona.

Svatkovskiy decided to retire from sports after the 2000 Olympics and worked as a modern pentathlon coach for a short while before going to politics. From 2006-10, Svatkovskiy worked as the minister of economics of the Nizhny Novgorod Oblast and since 2010 has been the deputy governor of the Nizhny Novgorod Oblast. Since 2006 he has worked as the president of European Modern Pentathlon Federation and is the president of the charitable organization, Five Rings, which provides health and social protection for retired athletes.

He was married to former rhythmic gymnast, Olympic bronze medalist Oxana Skaldina, their daughter Daria Svatkovskaya (b. 1996) is also a rhythmic gymnast.

In September 2018, Svatkovsky was elected Member of the State Duma from Nizhny Novgorod constituency at the by-election.
