= Dmitry Larin =

Russian footballer and manager

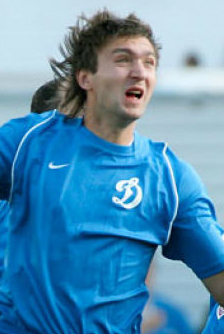
- Larin in 2007

Personal information
- Full name: Dmitry Borisovich Larin
- Date of birth: 26 July 1973 (age 53)
- Place of birth: Pervomaysk, Gorky Oblast, Russian SFSR
- Height: 1.80 m (5 ft 11 in)
- Positions: Defender; midfielder

Senior career*
Years	Team	Apps	(Gls)
1993–1998	FC Kristall Smolensk	106	(8)
1999–2002	FC Dynamo Bryansk	148	(20)
2003	FC Zvezda Irkutsk	19	(0)
2004–2005	FC Avangard Kursk	58	(13)
2006–2010	FC Dynamo Bryansk	138	(7)

Managerial career
- 2010–2011: FC Dynamo Bryansk (academy)
- 2012–2015: FC Dynamo Bryansk
- * Club domestic league appearances and goals

Dmitry Borisovich Larin (Russian: Дми́трий Бори́сович Ла́рин; born 26 July 1973) is a Russian professional association football manager and a former player.

== Playing career ==
He played 7 seasons in the Russian Football National League for FC Kristall Smolensk, FC Avangard Kursk and FC Dynamo Bryansk.
