= Yury Stankevich =

Russian politician

Yury Stankevich MP
- Юрий Станкевич
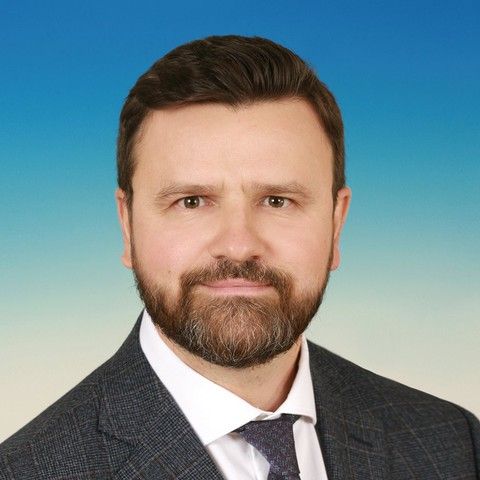

Member of the State Duma (Party List Seat)
- Incumbent
- Assumed office 12 October 2021

Personal details
- Born: 24 July 1976 (age 49) Saratov, RSFSR, USSR
- Party: United Russia
- Education: Financial University

Yury Arkadievich Stankevich (Note: also transliterated Yuri Arkadievich Stankevich) (Russian: Юрий Аркадьевич Станкевич; born July 24, 1976, in Saratov) is a Russian political figure and member of the State Duma.

From 1993 to 2001, Stankevich served at the Russian Armed Forces. In 2011-2021, he served as an assistant to the Deputy of the State Duma of the 6th and 7th convocations. In 2013, he was appointed Head of the Department for Work with Federal Authorities and Public Organizations of PJSC Lukoil. Since the September 2021 Russian legislative election, he has served as Deputy to the 8th State Duma from the United Russia party list. In March 2022, he was appointed head of the new project titled "Green Economy" aimed at reducing environmental risks.
