= Pervomaysk, Nizhny Novgorod Oblast =

Town in Nizhny Novgorod Oblast, Russia

Pervomaysk Первомайск
- Town
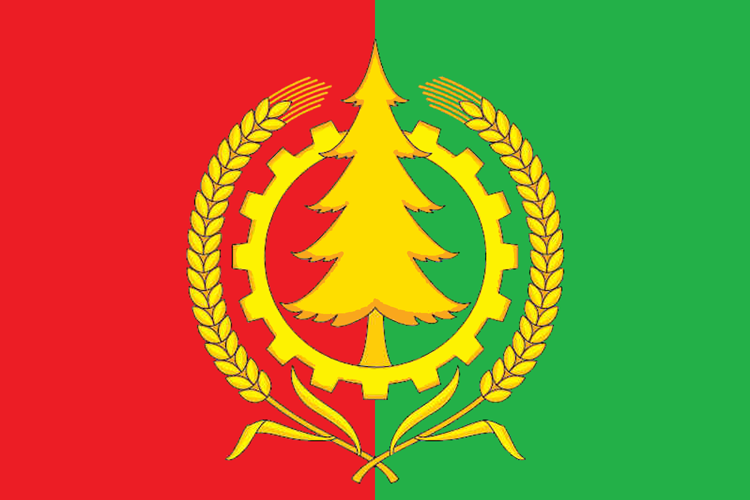
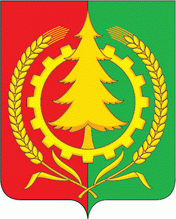
- Flag Coat of arms
- Interactive map of Pervomaysk
- Location of Pervomaysk Pervomaysk (Nizhny Novgorod Oblast)
- Coordinates: 54°52′N 43°48′E
- Country: Russia
- Federal subject: Nizhny Novgorod Oblast

Population (2010 Census)
  - Total: 14,568
  - Estimate (2021): 13,223 (−9.2%)

Administrative status
  - Subordinated to: town of oblast significance of Pervomaysk
  - Capital of: town of oblast significance of Pervomaysk

Municipal status
  - Urban okrug: Pervomaysk Urban Okrug
  - Capital of: Pervomaysk Urban Okrug
- Time zone: UTC+3 (MSK)
- Postal codes: 607760, 607762
- OKTMO ID: 22734000001

Pervomaysk (Russian: Первома́йск) is a town in Nizhny Novgorod Oblast, Russia, located 190 kilometers (120 mi) south of Nizhny Novgorod. Population: 14,568 (2010 census); 15,094 (2002 census); 16,428 (1989 Soviet census); 16,000 (1974).

== History ==
Until 1951 the town was known as Tashino.

== Administrative and municipal status ==
Within the framework of administrative divisions, it is, together with one work settlement and forty-three rural localities, incorporated as the town of oblast significance of Pervomaysk—an administrative unit with the status equal to that of the districts. As a municipal division, the town of oblast significance of Pervomaysk is incorporated as Pervomaysk Urban Okrug.

Until July 2012, the town served as the administrative center of Pervomaysky District and, within the framework of administrative divisions, was incorporated as a town of district significance. As a municipal division, it was incorporated as Pervomaysk Urban Settlement within Pervomaysky Municipal District.

== Notable people ==
- Dmitry Larin (born 1973), football player and manager
- Gennady Ulanov (1929–2018), Soviet politician
