= Sergachsky District =

Sergachsky District Сергачский район (Russian)
- District
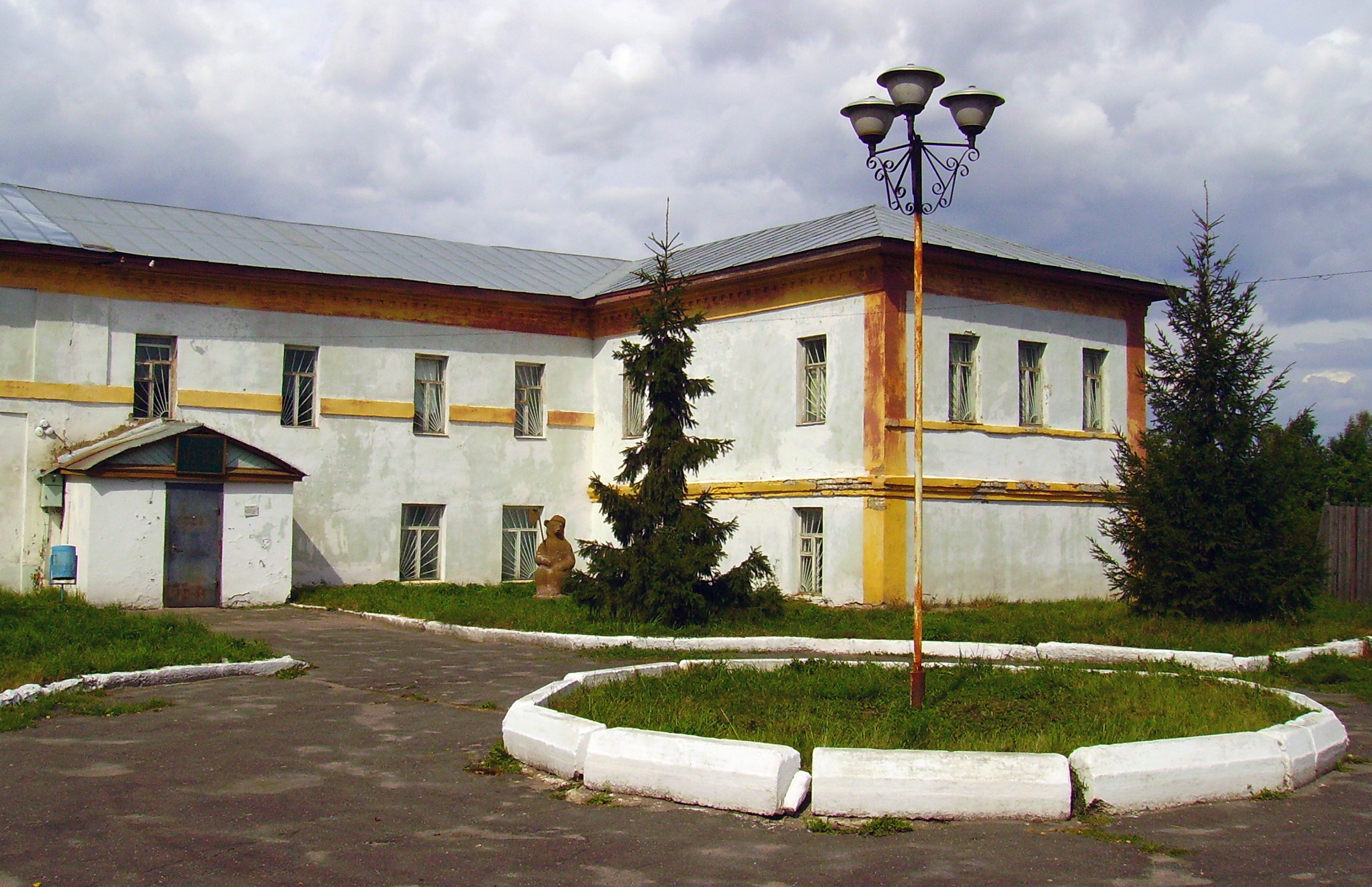
- The town museum of Sergach, Sergachsky District

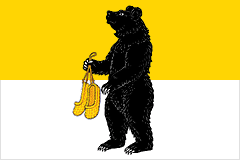
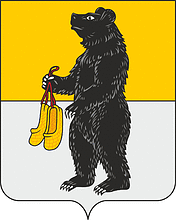
- Flag Coat of arms
- Location of Sergachsky District in Nizhny Novgorod Oblast
- Coordinates: 55°32′N 45°28′E
- Country: Russia
- Federal subject: Nizhny Novgorod Oblast
- Established: 1929
- Administrative center: Sergach

Area
  - Total: 1,243.8 km^{2} (480.2 sq mi)

Population (2010 Census)
  - Total: 31,296
  - Density: 25.162/km^{2} (65.168/sq mi)
  - Urban: 68.3%
  - Rural: 31.7%

Administrative structure
  - Administrative divisions: 1 Towns of district significance, 10 Selsoviets
  - Inhabited localities: 1 cities/towns, 64 rural localities

Municipal structure
  - Municipally incorporated as: Sergachsky Municipal District
  - Municipal divisions: 1 urban settlements, 10 rural settlements
- Time zone: UTC+3 (MSK)
- OKTMO ID: 22548000
- Website: http://sergach.omsu-nnov.ru

Sergachsky District (Russian: Серга́чский райо́н) is an administrative district (raion), one of the forty in Nizhny Novgorod Oblast, Russia. Municipally, it is incorporated as Sergachsky Municipal District. It is located in the southeast of the oblast. The area of the district is 1,243.8 square kilometers (480.2 sq mi). Its administrative center is the town of Sergach. Population: 31,296 (2010 Census); 35,779 (2002 census); 42,588 (1989 Soviet census). The population of Sergach accounts for 68.3% of the district's total population.

== History ==
The district was established in 1929.
