= Borsky District =

Location of Samara Oblast in Russia

Borsky District is the name of several administrative and municipal districts in Russia.

== Modern districts ==
- Borsky District, Samara Oblast, an administrative and municipal district of Samara Oblast

== Historical districts ==
- Borsky District, Nizhny Novgorod Oblast, a former administrative and municipal district of Nizhny Novgorod Oblast; in terms of the administrative units transformed into a city of oblast significance, and in terms of the municipal units transformed into an urban okrug in March 2010
