= Koshelikha, Vladimir Oblast =

Koshelikha Кошелиха
- Village
- Location within Vladimir Oblast Location within Russia
- Coordinates: 56°08′N 42°51′E
- Country: Russia
- Region: Vladimir Oblast
- District: Gorokhovetsky District
- Time zone: UTC+3:00

Koshelikha (Russian: Кошелиха) is a rural locality (a village) in Kupriyanovskoye Rural Settlement, Gorokhovetsky District, Vladimir Oblast, Russia. The population was 27 as of 2010.

== Geography ==
Koshelikha is located on the Suvoroshch, 14 km southeast of Gorokhovets (the district's administrative centre) by road. Yurovo is the nearest rural locality.
