= Ardatovsky District =

Administrative and municipal district name

Location of the Republic of Mordovia in Russia

Location of Nizhny Novgorod Oblast in Russia

Ardatovsky District is the name of several administrative and municipal districts in Russia.

- Ardatovsky District, Republic of Mordovia, an administrative and municipal district of the Republic of Mordovia
- Ardatovsky District, Nizhny Novgorod Oblast, an administrative and municipal district of Nizhny Novgorod Oblast
