= Sergach =

Town in Nizhny Novgorod Oblast, Russia

Sergach Сергач
- Town
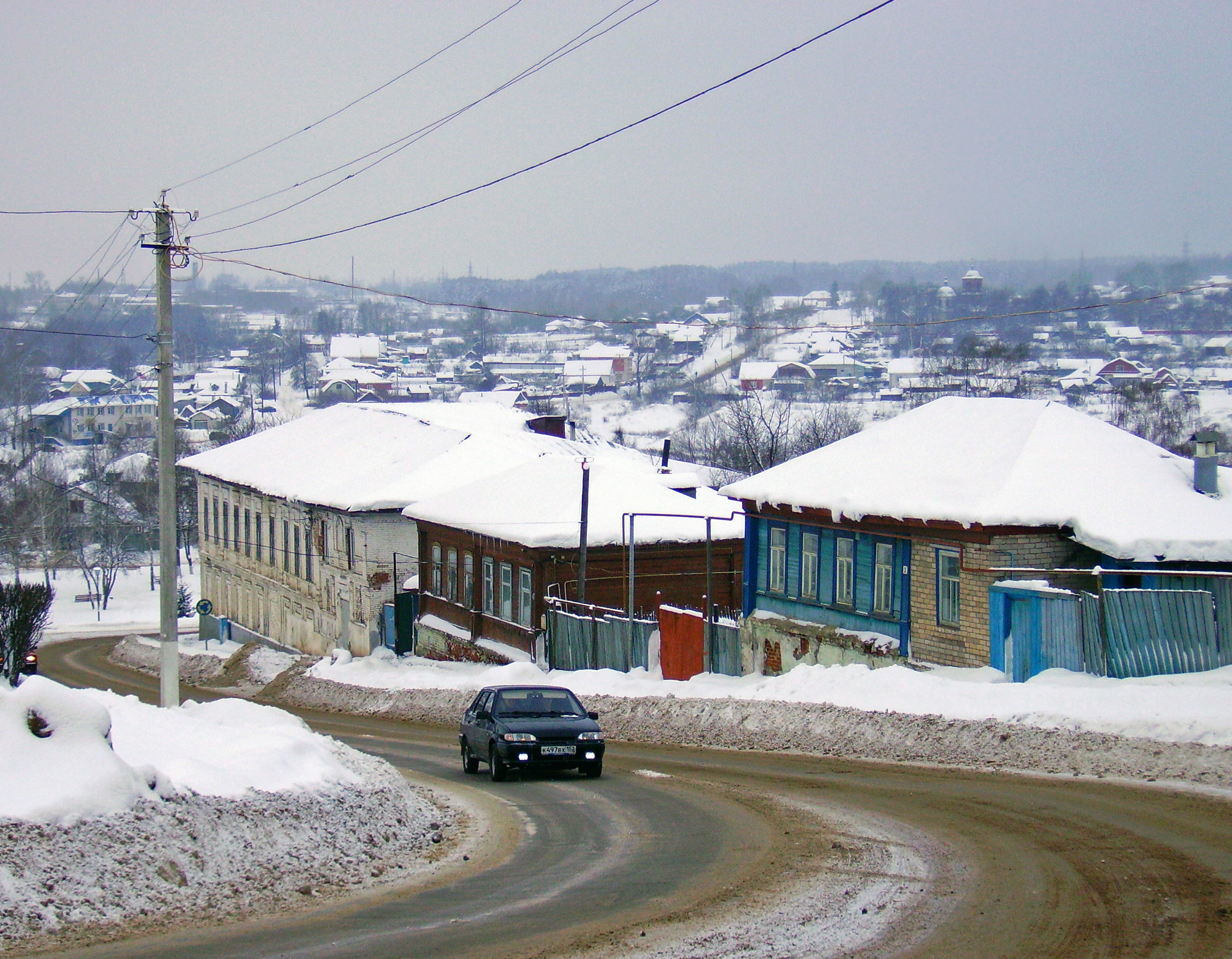
- Sovetskaya Street in Sergach

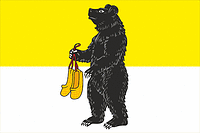
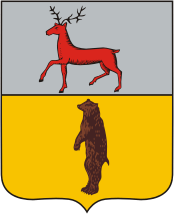
- Flag Coat of arms
- Interactive map of Sergach
- Location of Sergach Sergach (Nizhny Novgorod Oblast)
- Coordinates: 55°32′N 45°28′E
- Country: Russia
- Federal subject: Nizhny Novgorod Oblast
- Administrative district: Sergachsky District
- Town of district significanceSelsoviet: Sergach
- First mentioned: 1649
- Town status since: 1779
- Elevation: 120 m (390 ft)

Population (2010 Census)
  - Total: 21,386
  - Estimate (2021): 20,256 (−5.3%)

Administrative status
  - Capital of: Sergachsky District, town of district significance of Sergach

Municipal status
  - Municipal district: Sergachsky Municipal District
  - Urban settlement: Sergach Urban Settlement
  - Capital of: Sergachsky Municipal District, Sergach Urban Settlement
- Time zone: UTC+3 (MSK)
- Postal codes: 607500, 607510, 607511, 607513, 607514
- OKTMO ID: 22648101001

Sergach (Russian: Серга́ч) is a town and the administrative center of Sergachsky District in Nizhny Novgorod Oblast, Russia, located on the Pyana River (Sura's tributary), 150 kilometers (93 mi) southeast of Nizhny Novgorod, the administrative center of the oblast. Population: 21,386 (2010 census); 22,887 (2002 census); 25,231 (1989 Soviet census).

== History ==
The village of Sergach was first mentioned in 1649. It was granted town status in 1779.

== Administrative and municipal status ==
Within the framework of administrative divisions, Sergach serves as the administrative center of Sergachsky District. As an administrative division, it is, together with two rural localities, incorporated within Sergachsky District as the town of district significance of Sergach. As a municipal division, the town of district significance of Sergach is incorporated within Sergachsky Municipal District as Sergach Urban Settlement.

== Transportation ==
The town is located on one of Russia's high-speed railways connecting Moscow with Kazan and has its own railway station.
