= Vorotynsky District =

Vorotynsky District Воротынский район (Russian)
- District
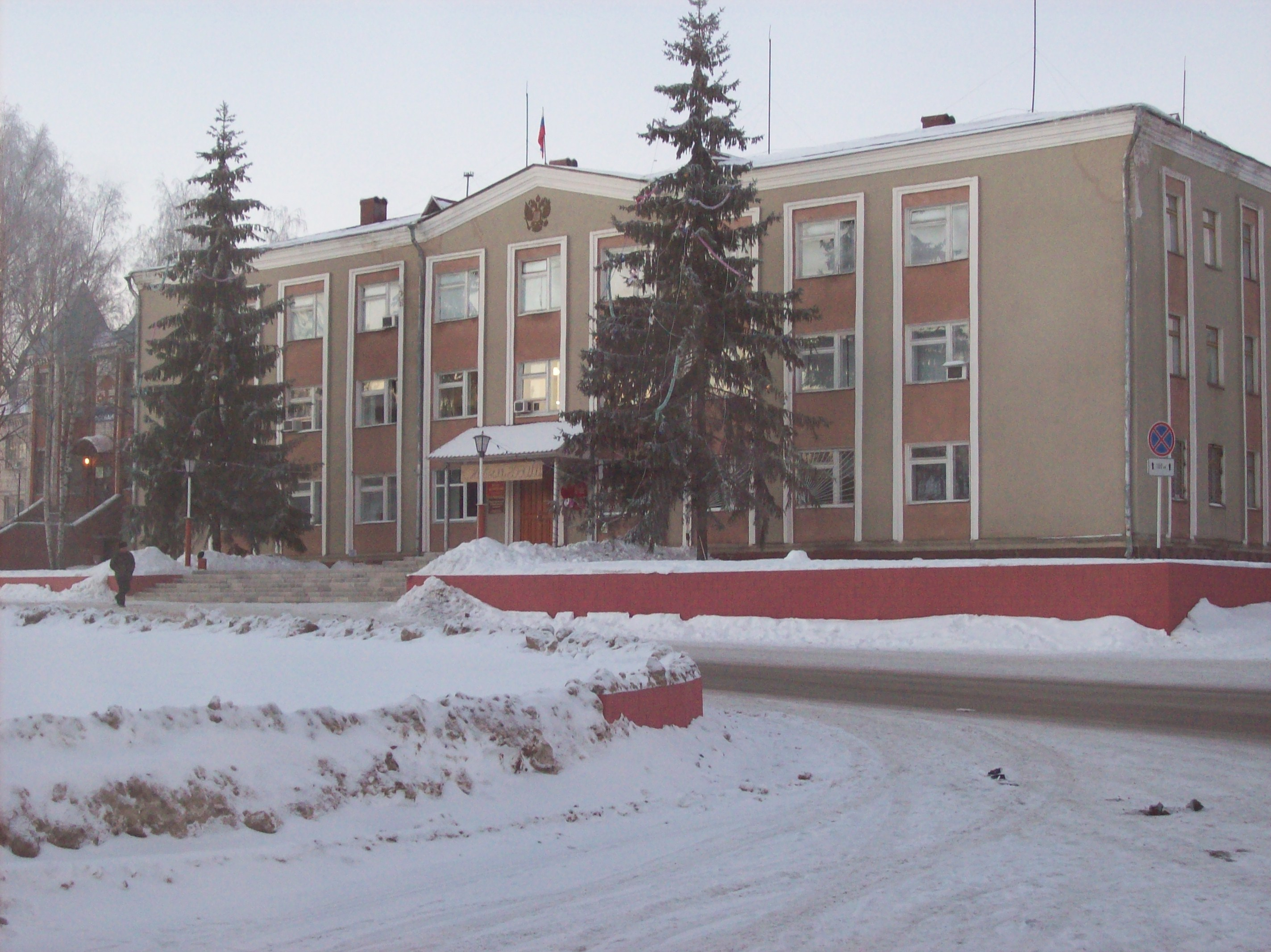
- Vorotynsky District Administration building in Vorotynets

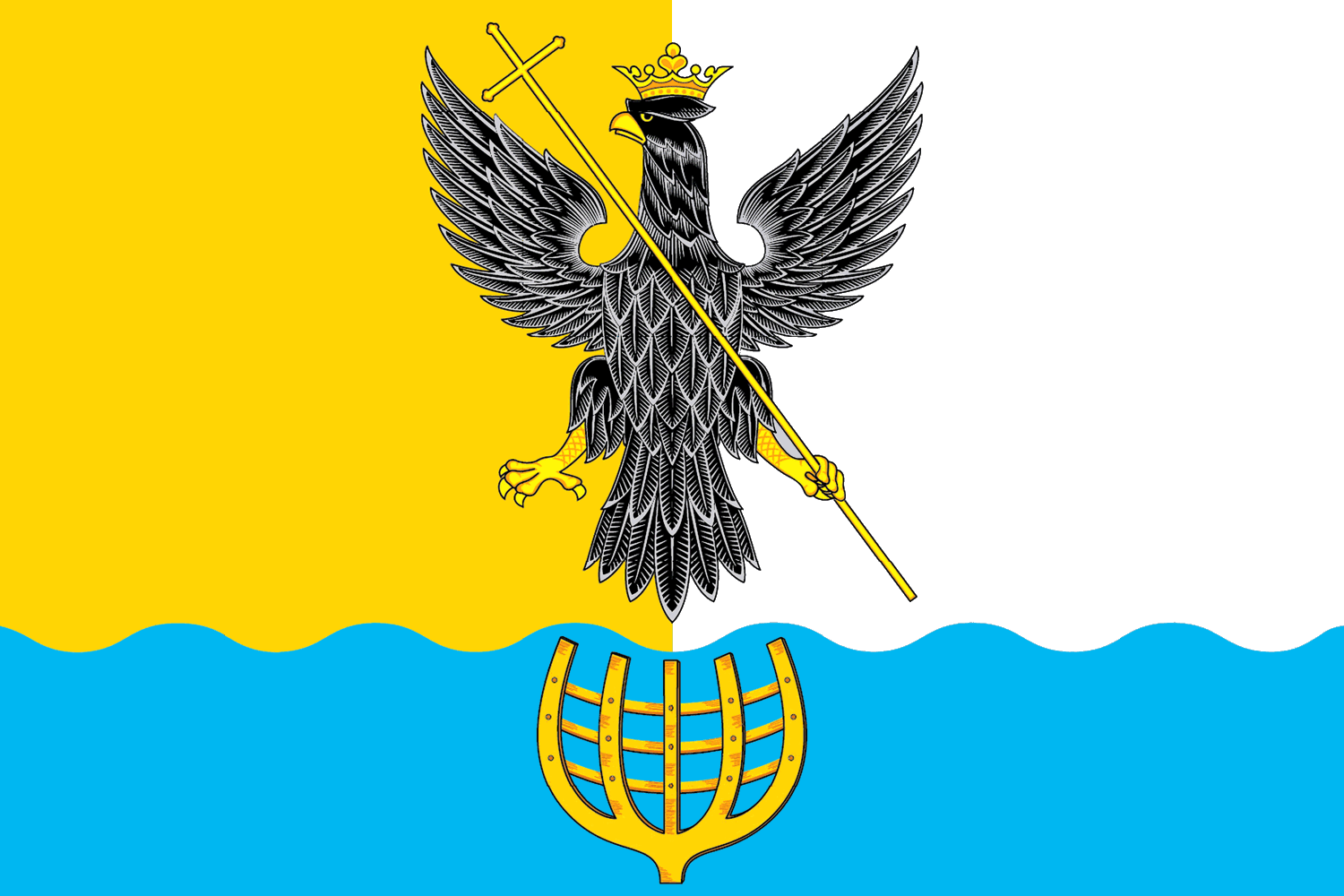
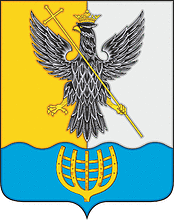
- Flag Coat of arms
- Location of Vorotynsky District in Nizhny Novgorod Oblast
- Coordinates: 56°03′N 45°51′E
- Country: Russia
- Federal subject: Nizhny Novgorod Oblast
- Established: 1929
- Administrative center: Vorotynets

Area
  - Total: 1,935.8 km^{2} (747.4 sq mi)

Population (2010 Census)
  - Total: 19,411
  - Density: 10.027/km^{2} (25.971/sq mi)
  - Urban: 38.7%
  - Rural: 61.3%

Administrative structure
  - Administrative divisions: 2 Work settlements, 9 Selsoviets
  - Inhabited localities: 2 urban-type settlements, 56 rural localities

Municipal structure
  - Municipally incorporated as: Vorotynsky Municipal District
  - Municipal divisions: 2 urban settlements, 9 rural settlements
- Time zone: UTC+3 (MSK)
- OKTMO ID: 22621000
- Website: http://vorotynec.omsu-nnov.ru

Vorotynsky District (Russian: Вороты́нский райо́н) is an administrative district (raion), one of the forty in Nizhny Novgorod Oblast, Russia. Municipally, it is incorporated as Vorotynsky Municipal District. It is located in the east of the oblast. The area of the district is 1,935.8 square kilometers (747.4 sq mi). Its administrative center is the urban locality (a work settlement) of Vorotynets. Population: 19,411 (2010 Census); 21,844 (2002 census); 26,230 (1989 Soviet census). The population of Vorotynets accounts for 33.2% of the district's total population.

== History ==
The district was established in 1929.
