= Buturlino, Nizhny Novgorod Oblast =

Buturlino Бутурлино
- Urban-type settlement
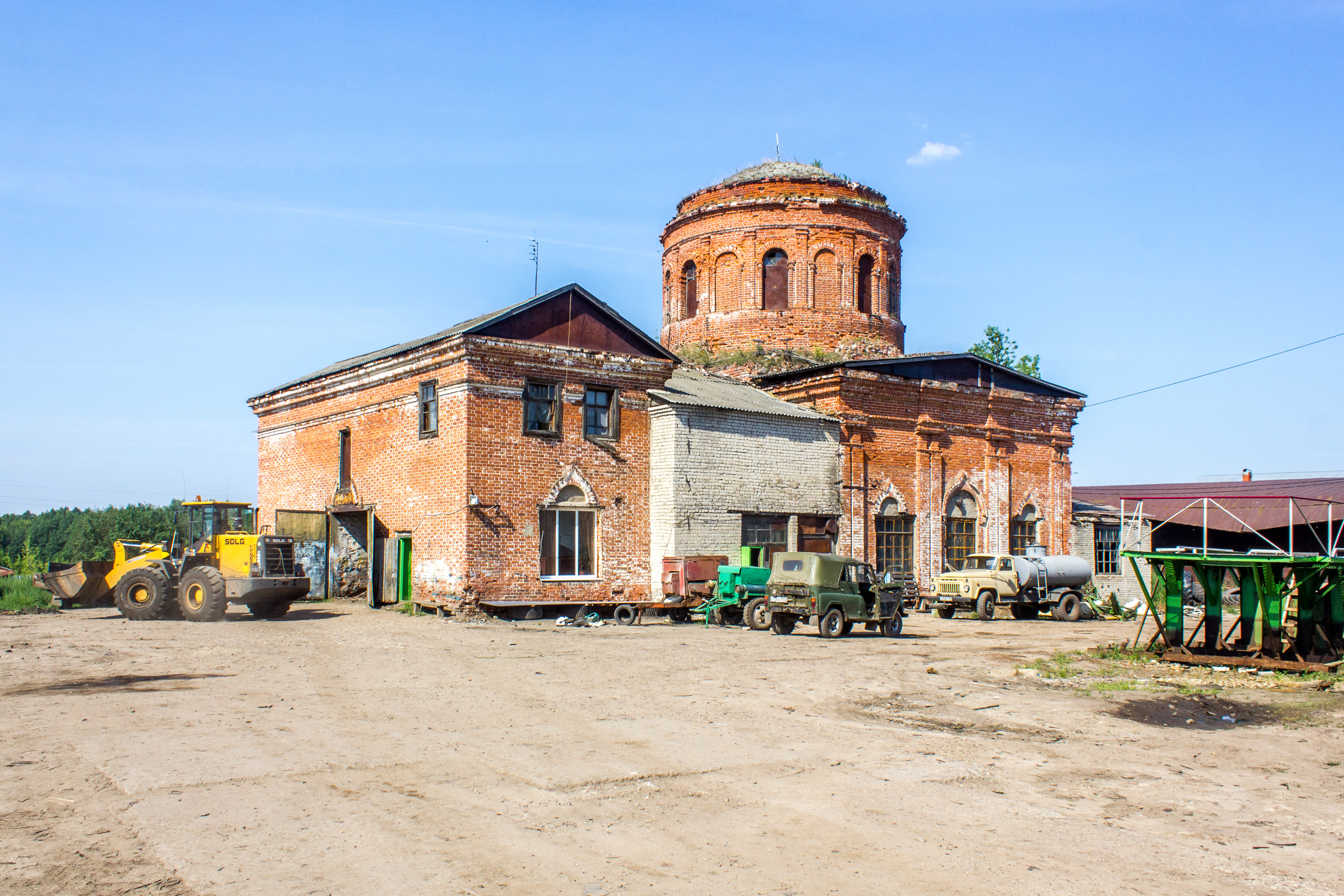
- Interactive map of Buturlino
- Location of Buturlino Buturlino (Nizhny Novgorod Oblast)
- Coordinates: 55.5688°N 44.8913°E
- Country: Russia
- Federal subject: Nizhny Novgorod Oblast
- Administrative district: Buturlinsky District
- Founded: 1551

Population (2010 Census)
  - Total: 6,412
  - Estimate (2025): 6,772 (+5.6%)
- Time zone: UTC+3 (MSK)
- Postal code: 607440
- OKTMO ID: 22612151051

Buturlino (Russian: Бутурлино́) is an urban locality (an urban-type settlement) in Buturlinsky District of Nizhny Novgorod Oblast, Russia. Population: 6,412 (2010 census); 6,975 (2002 census); 6,449 (1989 Soviet census).
