= Pervomaysky District, Nizhny Novgorod Oblast =

Coordinates: 54°52′N 43°48′E

Location of Pervomaysky District in Nizhny Novgorod Oblast

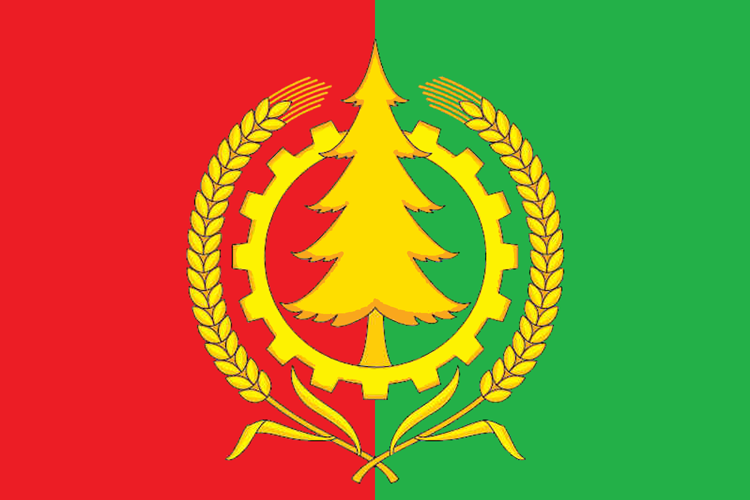
Flag of Pervomaysky District

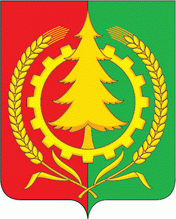
Coat of arms of Pervomaysky District

Pervomaysky District (Russian: Первома́йский райо́н) was an administrative and municipal district (raion) in Nizhny Novgorod Oblast, Russia. It was located in the south of the oblast. The area of the district was 1,227.3 square kilometers (473.9 sq mi). Its administrative center was the town of Pervomaysk. Population: 20,455 (2010 Census); 22,344 (2002 census); 26,926 (1989 Soviet census). The population of Pervomaysk accounted for 71.2% of the district's total population.

== History ==
The district was established in 1929. Per Law #83-Z of July 3, 2012, the district was transformed into a town of oblast significance of Pervomaysk. In the similar manner, Law #82-Z abolished Pervomaysky Municipal District and transformed it into Pervomaysk Urban Okrug.

== Administrative and municipal divisions ==
As of July 2012, the district was administratively divided into one town of district significance (Pervomaysk), one work settlement (Satis), and two selsoviets (comprising forty-three rural localities). Municipally, Pervomaysky Municipal District was divided into two urban settlements and two rural settlements.
