= Prioksky City District =

Prioksky District Приокский район
- District
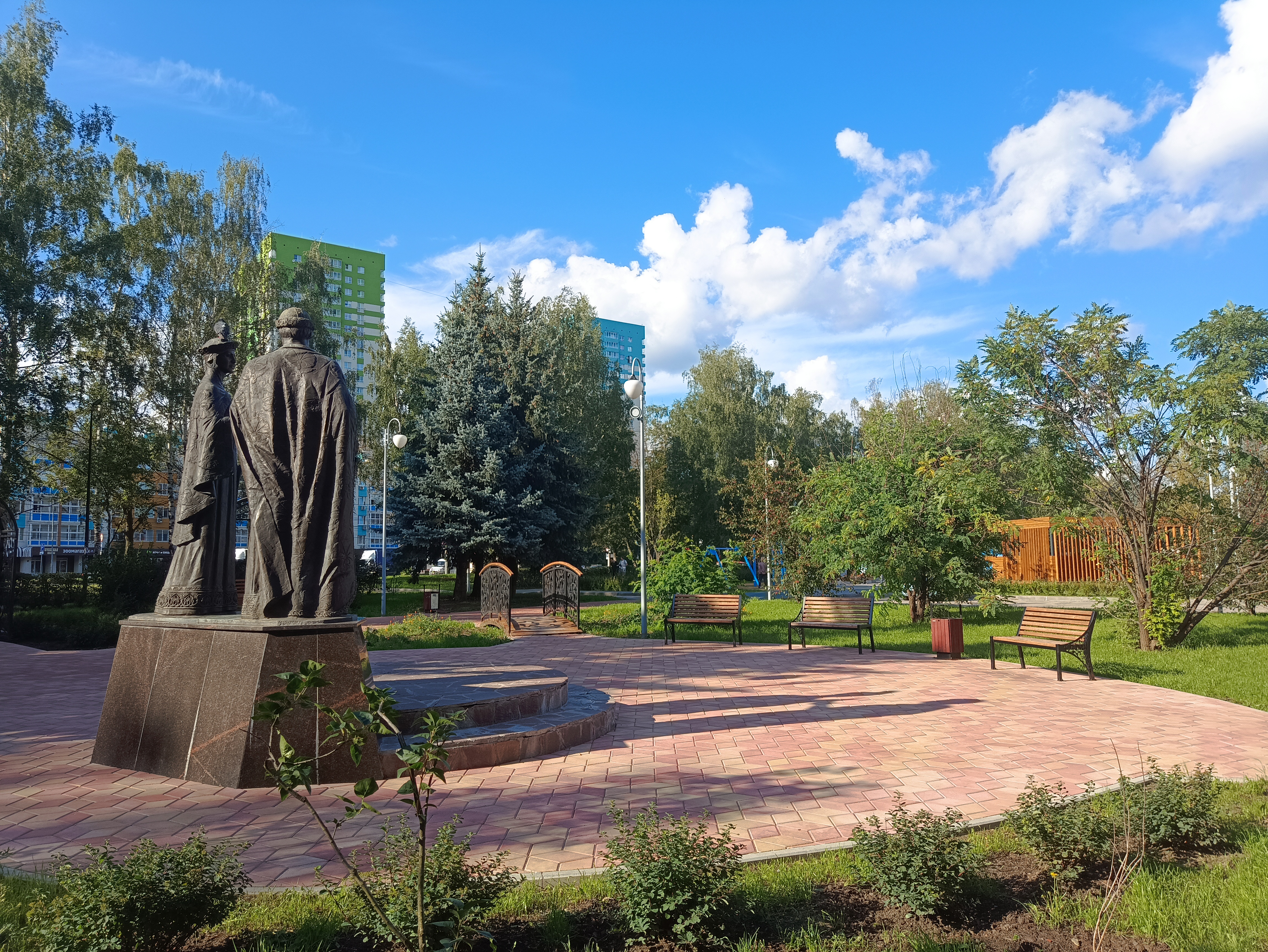

- Coat of arms
- Coordinates: 56°14′43.890″N 43°59′8.689″E
- Country: Russia
- Federal subject: Nizhny Novgorod Oblast
- Established: 1935
- Administrative center: Nizhny Novgorod

Area
  - Total: 23 km^{2} (8.9 sq mi)

Administrative structure
  - Inhabited localities: Novinki urban-type settlements

Prioksky City District (Russian: Прио́кский райо́н) is one of the eight districts of the city of Nizhny Novgorod, Russia. It is located in the upper part of the city on the high right bank of the Oka River and has a land border only with Sovetsky City District along Meditsinskaya Street. It is also connected by the Myza Bridge with Avtozavodsky City District in the lower part of Nizhny Novgorod across the Oka. Population: 102,652 (2021 Census); 90,410 (2010 Census); 96,043 (2002 Census); 106,206 (1989 Soviet census).

The district local government headquarters are located in the district center on 40 Let Oktyabrya Street.

The district is essentially residential but it has some industrial enterprises. The latter include radio, electric, and electronics state-owned Frunze Plant as well as JSC Thermal and NITEL, which are in the same line of business. A number of scientific institutions are also located in the district. Their scope of interests are also connected with telecommunications and radar applications. A lot of small private-owned enterprises offer the service and employment opportunities for the residents of the district and the entire city.

Prioksky district is the greenest in Nizhny Novgorod city, green area occupied about 904.3 hectares.

== Transportation ==
The main north-south transportation line of the district is Gagarin Avenue, which forks into Arzamas and Bogorodsk roads after crossing the city border. The southern section of this road is now known as Sakharov Avenue. The main east-west roadway through the district is formed by the Myza Bridge across the Oka and Larin Street; this in fact is a part of transit federal motorway M7 from Moscow to Kazan. It also provides the shortest and fastest way to drive into Kstovo and points east throughout Nizhny Novgorod Oblast.

The public transportation in Prioksky City District includes regional city bus routes, municipal trolleybus routes, municipal tram routes, and many privately owned marshrutka ("fixed-route taxis") vans. There are Myza commuter train rail station and Shcherbinki bus station for interurban transportation.

== Sights and culture ==
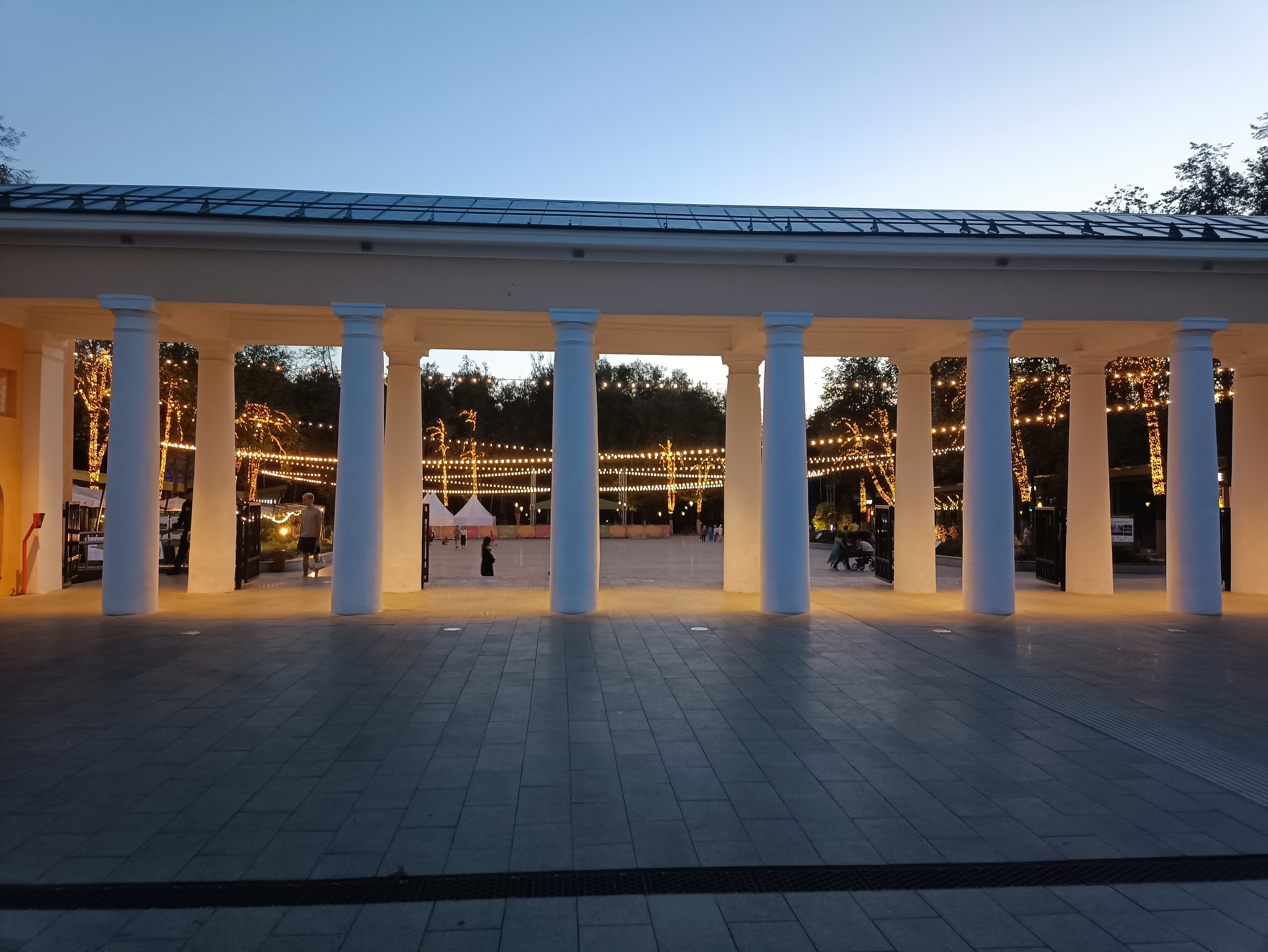
Switzerland park main gate.

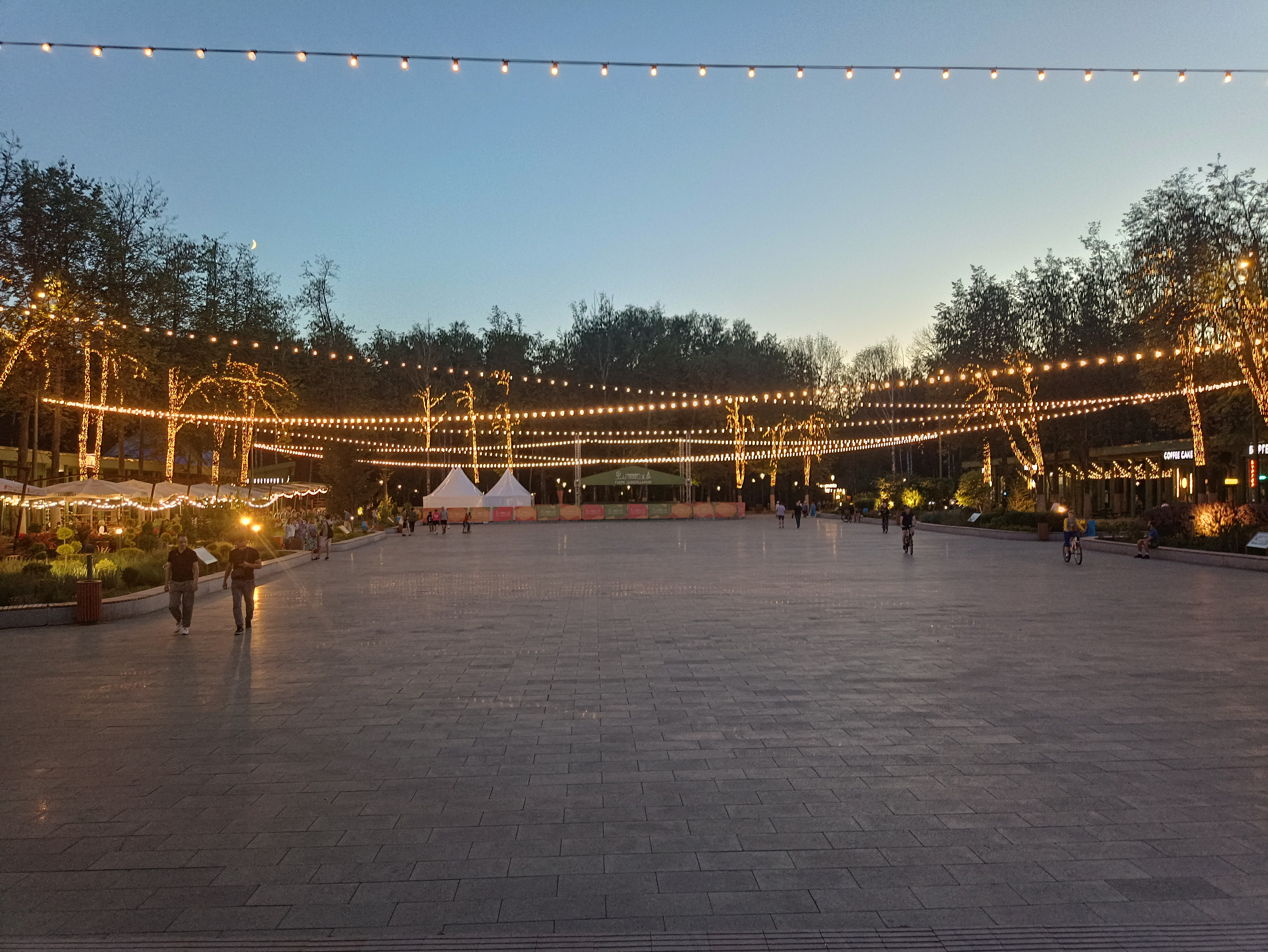
Switzerland park.

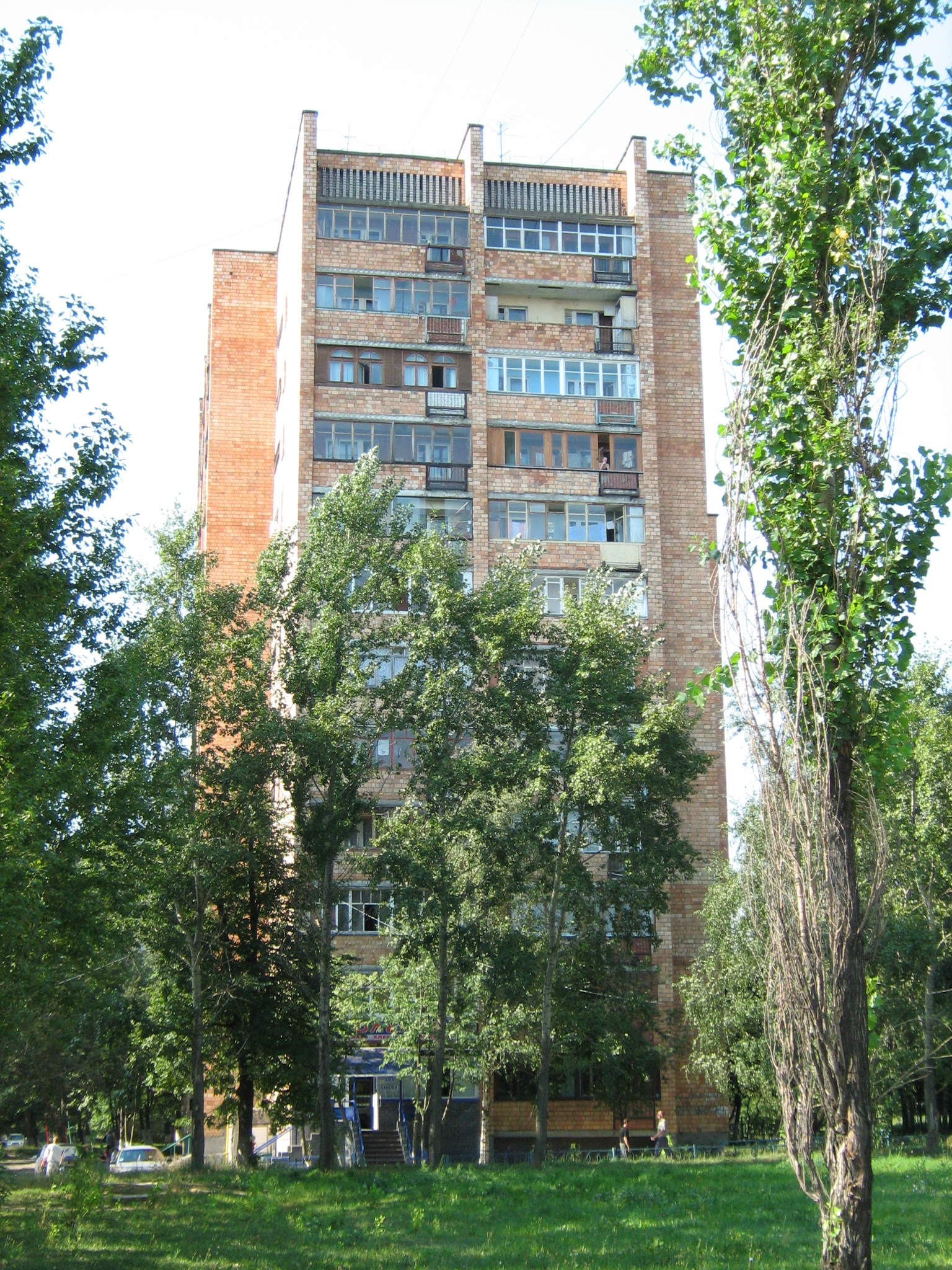
One of the apartment of this fairly ordinary apartment building is now Sakharov Museum

The culture institutions include three movie theaters, one of which is specialized for children, a large Switzerland park and Shchyolokovsky Khutor forest, attractive places to rest, and the District history museum nearby of the authorities headquarters. There are two monuments in the Switzerland park, dedicated to memory of fallen Russian soldiers in a local armed conflicts and to participants of workers' movement in the early 20th century.

The Nizhny Novgorod Andrey Sakharov Museum is located in the apartment in the Shcherbinki neighborhood where the scientist had to live in the 1980s.
