= Buturlinsky District =

Buturlinsky District Бутурлинский район (Russian)
- District
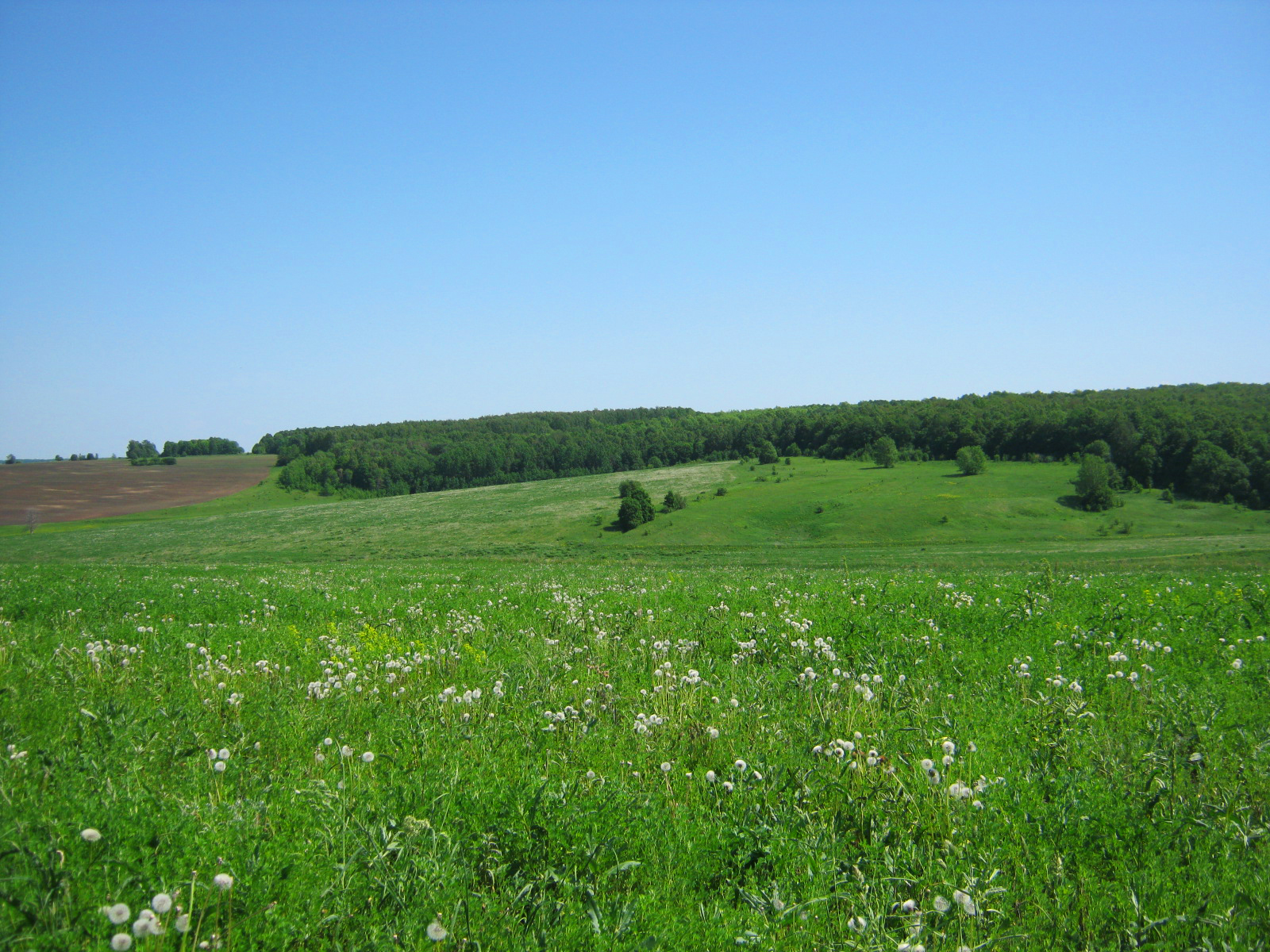
- Field near village Tartely, Buturlinsky District

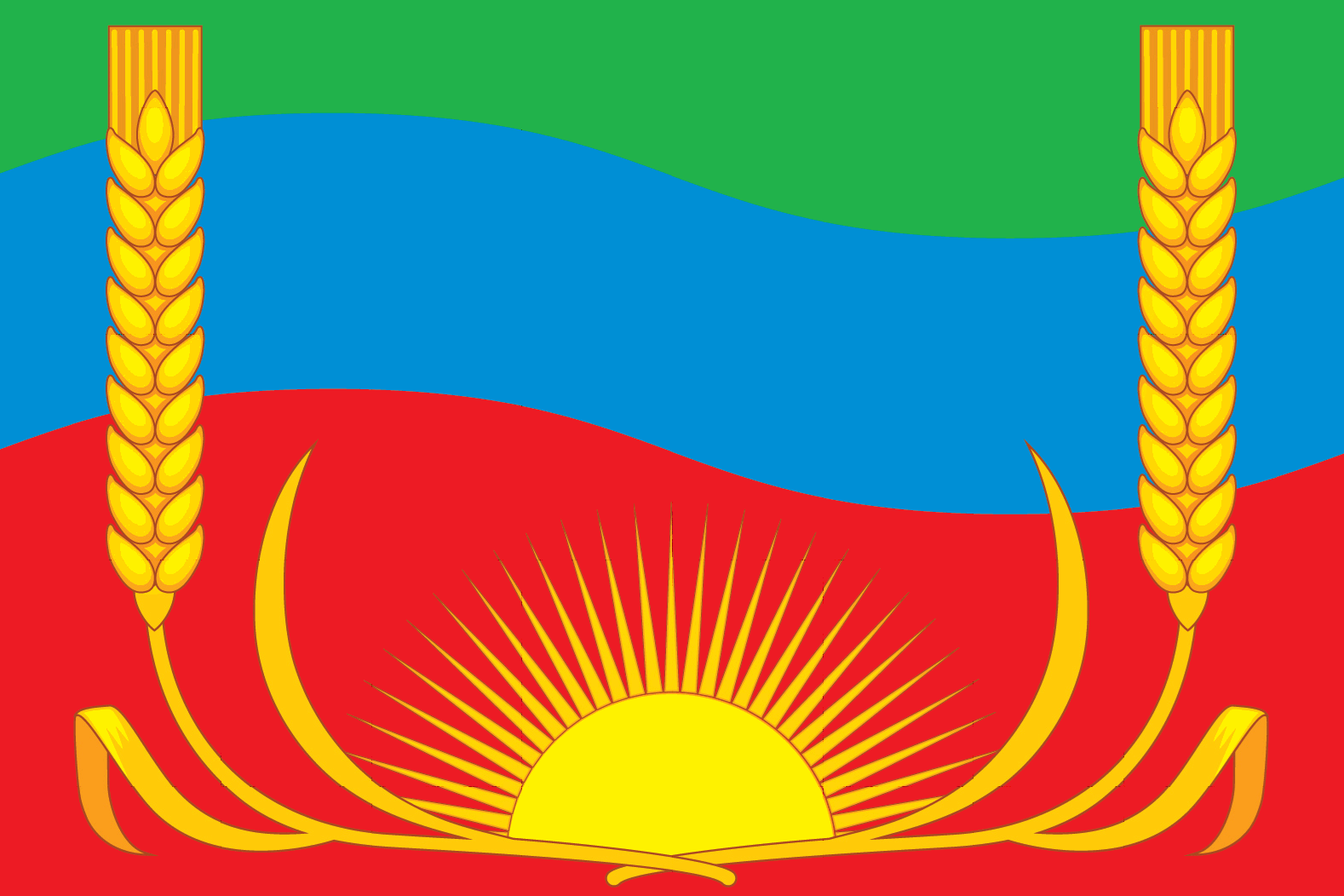
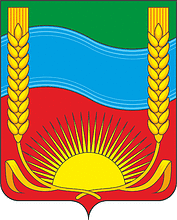
- Flag Coat of arms
- Location of Buturlinsky District in Nizhny Novgorod Oblast
- Coordinates: 55°33′55″N 44°54′02″E
- Country: Russia
- Federal subject: Nizhny Novgorod Oblast
- Established: 1929
- Administrative center: Buturlino

Area
  - Total: 1,105.2 km^{2} (426.7 sq mi)

Population (2010 Census)
  - Total: 14,471
  - Density: 13.094/km^{2} (33.912/sq mi)
  - Urban: 44.3%
  - Rural: 55.7%

Administrative structure
  - Administrative divisions: 1 Work settlements, 5 Selsoviets
  - Inhabited localities: 1 urban-type settlements, 53 rural localities

Municipal structure
  - Municipally incorporated as: Buturlinsky Municipal District
  - Municipal divisions: 1 urban settlements, 5 rural settlements
- Time zone: UTC+3 (MSK)
- OKTMO ID: 22612000
- Website: http://buturlino.ru

Buturlinsky District (Russian: Бутурли́нский райо́н) is an administrative district (raion), one of the forty in Nizhny Novgorod Oblast, Russia. Municipally, it is incorporated as Buturlinsky Municipal District. It is located in the southeastern central part of the oblast. The area of the district is 1,105.2 square kilometers (426.7 sq mi). Its administrative center is the urban locality (a work settlement) of Buturlino. Population: 14,471 (2010 Census); 16,723 (2002 census); 16,792 (1989 Soviet census). The population of Buturlino accounts for 44.3% of the district's total population.

== History ==
The district was established in 1929.
