= City Duma of Nizhny Novgorod =

City Duma of Nizhny Novgorod Городская дума Нижнего Новгорода

Type
- Type: Unicameral

Leadership
- Chairman: Oleg Lavrichev, United Russia

Structure
- Seats: 35
- Political groups: United Russia (26) CPRF (5); LDPR (2); SRZP (1) Party of Growth (1)

Elections
- Voting system: Mixed
- Last election: 13 September 2020
- Next election: 2025

Meeting place
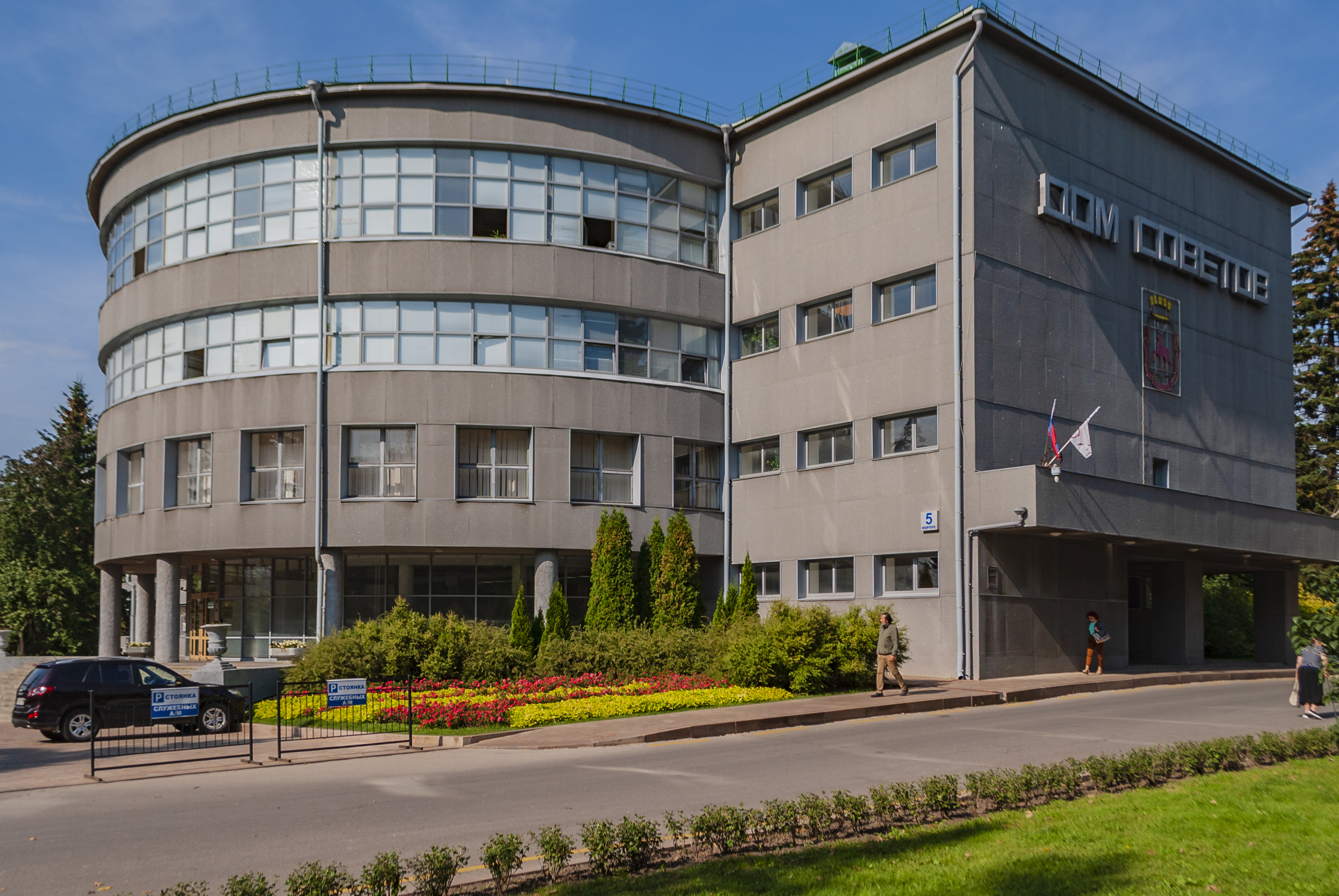
- Kremlin, Bldg. 5, Nizhny Novgorod

Website
- www.gordumannov.ru

The City Duma of Nizhny Novgorod (Russian: Городская дума Нижнего Новгорода, romanized: Gorodskaya duma Nizhnego Novgoroda) is the city duma of Nizhny Novgorod, Russia. It consists of 35 deputies elected for a term of 5 years. The status and powers of the Duma is determined by the articles of the Charter of Nizhny Novgorod.

== Powers ==
The City Duma of Nizhny Novgorod adopts plans and city development programs, approves the budget and reports on its implementation, and controls the execution of authority to address local issues.

In addition, the Duma decides about the joining of Nizhny Novgorod in the association of municipalities and about the joining of the City Duma in the association of representative bodies of municipalities. The Duma approves agreements on cooperation in the framework of foreign trade activities and twinning relations. It specifies the order of formation and the use of target budgetary funds. It also approves general urban development plans, procedures for establishing the amount of payments for accommodation, regulation of prices for goods and services of municipal utilities, and allowances to tariffs for consumers.

== Chairman ==
The current chairman of the Duma is Oleg Lavrichev.

Until 17 January 2018, when the City Duma elected the mayor in accordance with the new charter of the city of Nizhny Novgorod, the chairman of the City Duma was also the head of the city.
