= List of rural localities in Nizhny Novgorod Oblast =

Map of Russia with Nizhny Novgorod Oblast highlighted

This is a list of rural localities in Nizhny Novgorod Oblast. Nizhny Novgorod Oblast (Russian: Нижегоро́дская о́бласть, Nizhegorodskaya oblast), also known as Nizhegorod Oblast, is a federal subject of Russia (an oblast). Its administrative center is the city of Nizhny Novgorod. As of the 2010 Census, it had a population of 3,310,597.

== Arzamassky District ==
Rural localities in Arzamassky District:

- Abramovo

== Bolsheboldinsky District ==
Rural localities in Bolsheboldinsky District:

- Bolshoye Boldino

== Bor ==
Rural localities in Bor:

- Pamyat Parizhskoy Kommuny

== Buturlinsky District ==
Rural localities in Buturlinsky District:

- Yakubovka

== Diveyevsky District ==
Rural localities in Diveyevsky District:

- Diveyevo

== Gaginsky District ==
Rural localities in Gaginsky District:

- Gagino

== Krasnooktyabrsky District ==
Rural localities in Krasnooktyabrsky District:

- Abramovo
- Aktukovo
- Urazovka

== Kstovsky District ==
Rural localities in Kstovsky District:

- Fedyakovo
- Veliky Vrag

== Lyskovsky District ==
Rural localities in Lyskovsky District:

- Bakhmut

== Pavlovsky District ==
Rural localities in Pavlovsky District:

- Ababkovo

== Pervomaysk ==
Rural localities in Pervomaysk urban okrug:

- Alatyr

== Pochinkovsky District ==
Rural localities in Pochinkovsky District:

- Pochinki

== Sechenovsky District ==
Rural localities in Sechenovsky District:

- Sechenovo

== Sergachsky District ==
Rural localities in Sergachsky District:

- Abaimovo

== Shatkovsky District ==
Rural localities in Shatkovsky District:

- Krasny Bor

== Spassky District ==
Rural localities in Spassky District:

- Spasskoye

== Vachsky District ==
Rural localities in Vachsky District:

- Bolshoye Zagarino
- Krasno

== Vadsky District ==
Rural localities in Vadsky District:

- Vad

== Volodarsky District ==
Rural localities in Volodarsky District:

- Mulino

== Vyksa ==
Rural localities in Vyksa urban okrug:

- Verkhnyaya Vereya

== See also ==
- Lists of rural localities in Russia
