= Zvyagino =

Zvyagino (Russian: Звягино) is the name of several rural localities in Russia:

- Zvyagino, Chulkovsky Selsoviet, Vachsky District, Nizhny Novgorod Oblast, a hamlet in Chulkovsky Selsoviet, Vachsky District, Nizhny Novgorod Oblast
- Zvyagino, Kazakovsky Selsoviet, Vachsky District, Nizhny Novgorod Oblast, a hamlet in Kazakovsky Selsoviet, Vachsky District, Nizhny Novgorod Oblast
- Zvyagino, Voskresensky District, Nizhny Novgorod Oblast, a hamlet in Voskresensky District, Nizhny Novgorod Oblast

== See also ==
- Zvyagin
