= Bakhmut (disambiguation) =

Bakhmut is a city in eastern Ukraine. Bakhmut may also refer to:

== Populated places ==
- Bakhmut, Kazakhstan
- Bahmut, Moldova, which is spelled the same way as the Russian and Ukrainian settlements in the Cyrillic alphabet
- Bakhmut, Republic of Bashkortostan, Russia
- Bakhmut, Nizhny Novgorod Oblast, Russia

== Administrative units ==
- Bakhmut Raion, a district with its center in the city Bakhmut
- Bakhmut urban hromada, a hromada with its center in the city Bakhmut
- Bakhmut uezd, a historical administrative division centered in Bakhmut
- Bakhmut Province, a historical administrative division centered in Bakhmut

== Other ==
- Bakhmutka, a river formerly also known as the Bakhmut
