= Vadsky =

Vadsky (masculine), Vadskaya (feminine), or Vadskoye (neuter) may refer to:

- Vadsky District, a district of Nizhny Novgorod Oblast, Russia, whose center is Vad, Nizhny Novgorod Oblast
- Vadskaya, a rural locality (a village) in Nizhny Novgorod Oblast, Russia
