= Urazovka =

Urazovka (Russian: Уразовка) is the name of several rural localities in Russia:

- Urazovka, Republic of Mordovia, a village in Kurtashkinsky Selsoviet of Atyuryevsky District of the Republic of Mordovia
- Urazovka, Nizhny Novgorod Oblast, a selo in Urazovsky Selsoviet of Krasnooktyabrsky District of Nizhny Novgorod Oblast
- Urazovka, Ulyanovsk Oblast, a selo in Sosnovsky Rural Okrug of Karsunsky District of Ulyanovsk Oblast
