= Bolshoye Zagarino =

Bolshoye Zagarino Большое Загарино
- Village (selo)
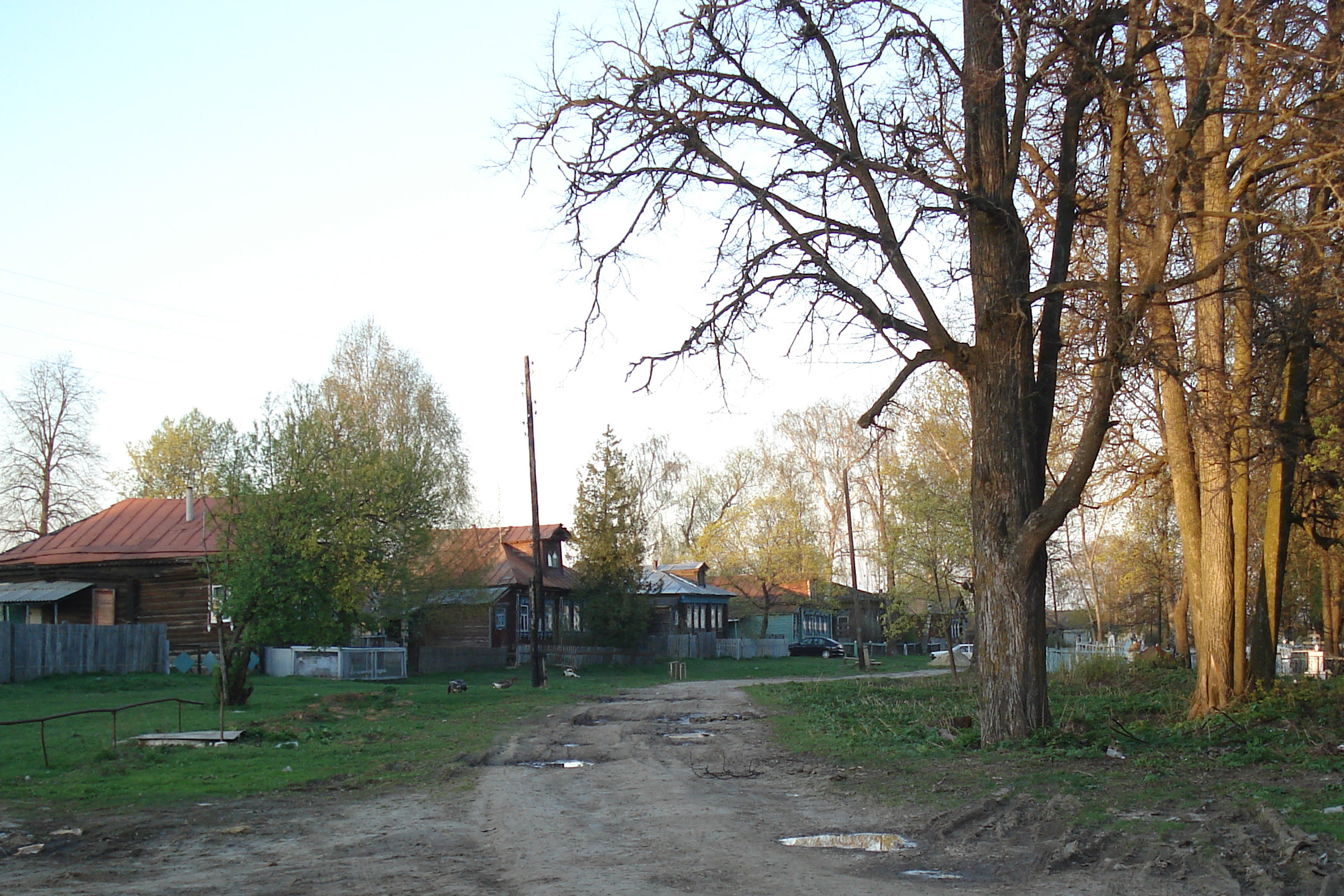
- View of the village
- Interactive map of Bolshoye Zagarino
- Location of Bolshoye Zagarino Bolshoye Zagarino (Nizhny Novgorod Oblast)
- Coordinates: 55°54′N 42°45′E
- Country: Russia
- Federal subject: Nizhny Novgorod Oblast
- Administrative district: Vachkovsky District
- Selsoviet: Chulkovsky Selsoviet
- Elevation: 166 m (545 ft)

Population
  - Estimate (2010): 41 )

Municipal status
  - Municipal district: Vachkovsky Municipal District
  - Rural settlement: Chulkovsky Rural Settlement
- Time zone: UTC+3 (MSK)
- Postal code: 606158
- Dialing code: +7 83173
- OKTMO ID: 22617440111

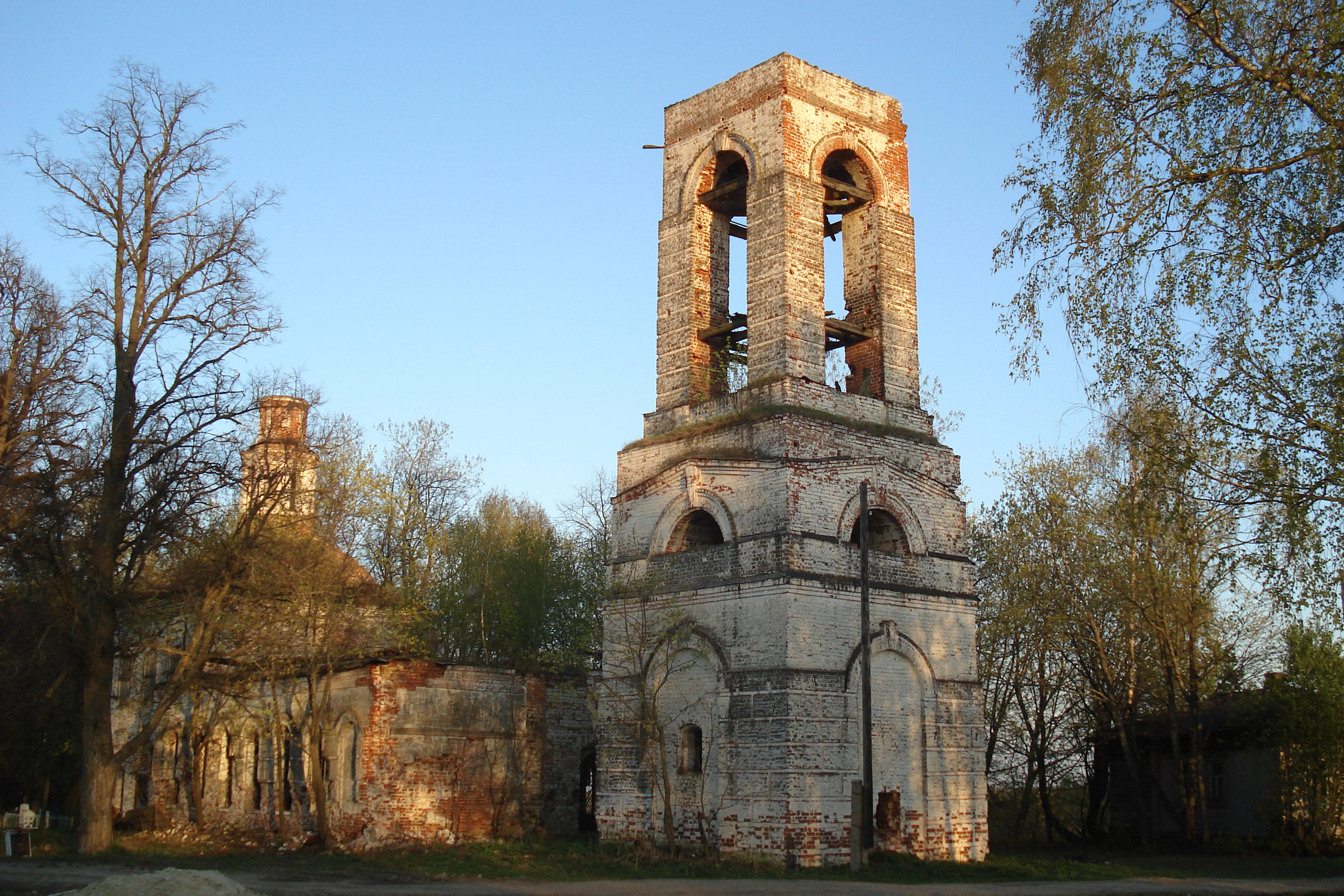
Pokrov Church in Bolshoye Zagarino

Bolshoye Zagarino (Russian: Большо́е Зага́рино) is a village (selo) in Vachsky District of Nizhny Novgorod Oblast, Russia. Municipally, the village is a part of Chulkovsky Rural Settlement, the administrative center of which is the village of Chulkovo.

== History ==
Before 1929, Bolshoye Zagarino was the center of Zagarinskaya Volost of Muromsky Uyezd of Vladimir Governorate. The volost's larger villages included Bolshoye Zagarino, Krasno, and Maloye Zagarino.

Bolshoye Zagarino is home to Pokrov Church, which was started to be built in 1810. In 1840, a bell tower was added to the church.

== Sources ==
- Добронравов В. Г., Березин В. М. "Историко-статистическое описание церквей и приходов Владимирской Епархии". Владимир, 1897, с. 288—290. Больше-Загаринский приход.
- Государственно-правовой департамент Нижегородской области. Приказ №1-од от 16 января 2009 г. «Об утверждении реестра административно-территориальных образований, городских и сельских населённых пунктов Нижегородской области». (State Legislative Department of Nizhny Novgorod Oblast. Order #1-od of January 16, 2009 On the Adoption of the Registry of the Administrative and Territorial Formations, Urban and Rural Localities of Nizhny Novgorod Oblast. ).
- Законодательное Собрание Нижегородской области. Закон №154-З от 24 октября 2005 г. «Об утверждении границ, состава территории Вачского муниципального района, границ и состава территорий муниципальных образований, входящих в состав Вачского муниципального района», в ред. Закона №67-З от 25 мая 2007 г. (Legislative Assembly of Nizhny Novgorod Oblast. Law #154-Z of October 24, 2005 On Establishing the Borders and the Territorial Composition of Vachsky Municipal District, the Borders and the Territorial Composition of the Municipal Formations of Vachsky Municipal District, as amended by the Law #67-Z of May 25, 2007. ).
