= Artemivsk (disambiguation) =

Artemivsk is the former name of Bakhmut, a city in Ukraine. Artemivsk may also refer to:

- The former name of Kypuche, a small city in Luhansk Oblast, Ukraine.
- Artemivsk, former small amphibious ship (type Zubr-class LCAC, prior to 1996 Soviet MDK-123), retired in 2000
- The Ukrainian name of Artyomovsk, Russia

== See also ==
- Artemivske
- Bakhmut (disambiguation)
