= Halidä Begičeva =

Tatar singer from Moscow

- Born: July 17, 1954 (age 71); Čümbäli, Krasnooktyabrsky District, Gorky Oblast
- Style: Folk music, pop music

Halidä Begičeva (Note: Tatar: Халидә Бегичева, romanized: Halidä Begičeva) is a Tatar singer who lives and works in Moscow. She is the sister of Häjdär Bigičev.

== Early life ==
Halidä Begičeva was born on July 17, 1954, in the village of Čümbäli, in Krasnooktyabrsky District, Gorky Oblast (now Nizhny Novgorod Oblast), into the Mishar Tatar family of a mechanic, Abbas Begičev. The family had a total of 12 children. Begičeva grew up practicing Islam with her family.

She sang in amateur groups throughout her youth. Together with her brother Häjdär Bigičev, they won 1st place in the song contest "Hello - we are looking for talent!" held in Gorky (now Nizhny Novgorod). She enrolled in college in the city of Gorky.

After graduating, Begičeva worked as a tailor in Gorky, and then returned to her village, taught her fellow villagers her tailoring techniques. While working as a tailor, Halidä often sang. Her co-workers encouraged her to pursue a career in singing.

After living in the village for a year, she went to Moscow, where she worked in a factory making aircraft components. During this time, she sang in a local choir, and was eventually invited to audition for the Pyatnitsky Choir. She was asked to sing at all the company's holidays and anniversaries. Her co-workers of non-Russian ethnicity remarked that she only sang in Russian, and encouraged her to "sing in your own language, Tatar songs are especially beautiful".

== Professional career ==
Halidä gradually entered the professional music scene in the late 1980s. At first, the group she worked with was called “Altyn Ai”, (Note: Tatar: Алтын Ай, romanized: Altyn Ai, lit. 'Golden Moon') and was then renamed to “Izge Ai”. (Note: Tatar: Изге Ай, romanized: Igze Ai, lit. 'Holy Moon') Igze Ai often performed charity concerts to support the construction of mosques throughout the country, including in Tatarstan, Moscow, Gorky Oblast, and in Siberia. Halidä has been the sole vocalist of Izge Ai, which previously also included her ex-spouse Ravil Kuznetsov, who hailed from the village of Kamka in Sergachsky District. The group grew in popularity in Russia during the early 1990s.

After about 30 years of marriage, Begičeva and Kuznetsov divorced. She continued to perform under the Izge Ai label, while Kuznetsov and other musicians continued to perform as Altyn Ai.

In June 2018, Begičeva said that she performed less often in previous years due to health problems, including a heart attack, as well as due to her desire to prioritize her religious devotion. At the time, she stated that she wished for her next concert tour to be her farewell tour.

=== Style ===
Izge Ai was a relatively unique act in the Tatar pop scene, in that it was a collaboration between Begičeva and Kuznetsov, as opposed to a solo act. This allowed the group to experiment with difference influences, including rock and roll and electropop. The act's songs have been described by one columnist as "mostly minimalist", who also remarked upon the nearly inaudible presence of Kuznetsov's guitar playing. Begičeva sings in the Mishar Tatar dialect.

== Personal life ==
Begičeva is a practicing Muslim, and made the Hajj in 2012. She is an avid sewer, and produces many of her own clothes, including many which she used to perform. Begičeva is a Mishar Tatar, and sings in the Mishar Tatar dialect.

Begičeva was married to her former bandmate Ravil Kuznetsov for about 30 years, and has stated her respect for his creative endeavors after their divorce.
