= Krasno, Russia =

Krasno
- Interactive map of Krasno
- Coordinates: 55°55′N 42°41′E

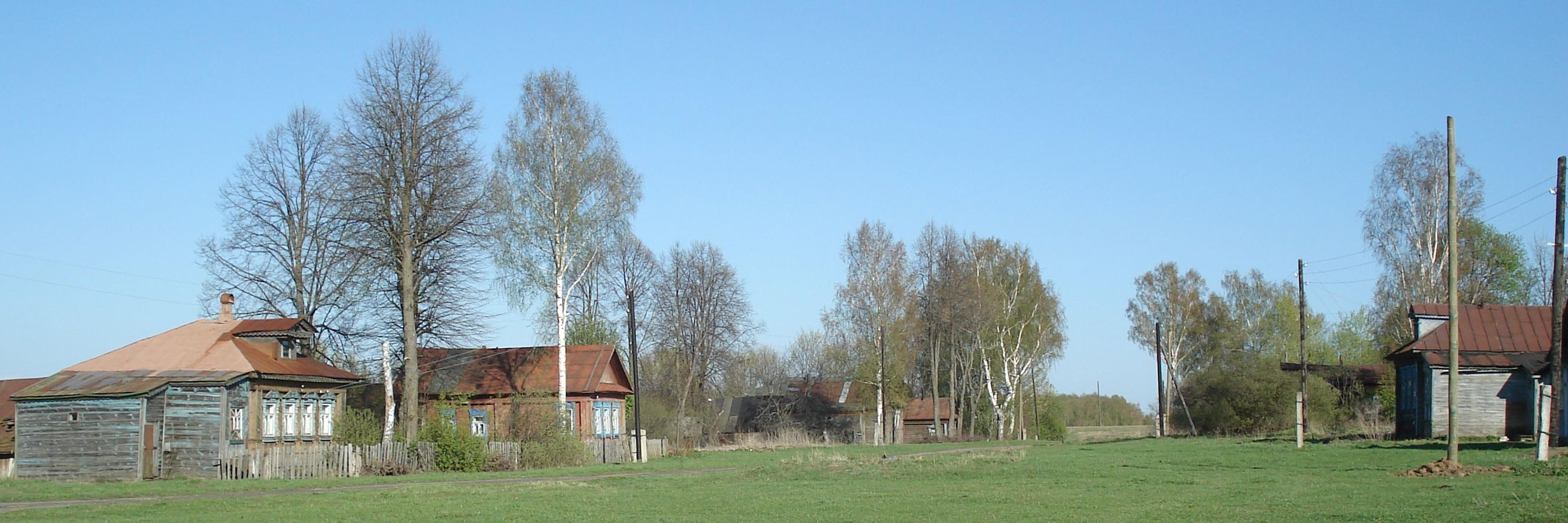
Eastern boundary of the village of Krasno

Krasno (Russian: Красно́) is a village (selo) in Vachsky District of Nizhny Novgorod Oblast, Russia. Municipally, the village is a part of Chulkovsky Rural Settlement, the administrative center of which is the village of Chulkovo. Postal code: 606149.

Krasno is located on the right side of the Dobrushka River (Tuzha's tributary, which itself flows into the Oka), 4 kilometres (2.5 mi) south of the left side of the Oka River and 20 kilometres (12 mi) north-east of Vacha, the administrative center of the district.

Before 1929, Krasno was administratively a part of Bolshezagarinskaya Volost of Muromsky Uyezd of Vladimir Governorate.

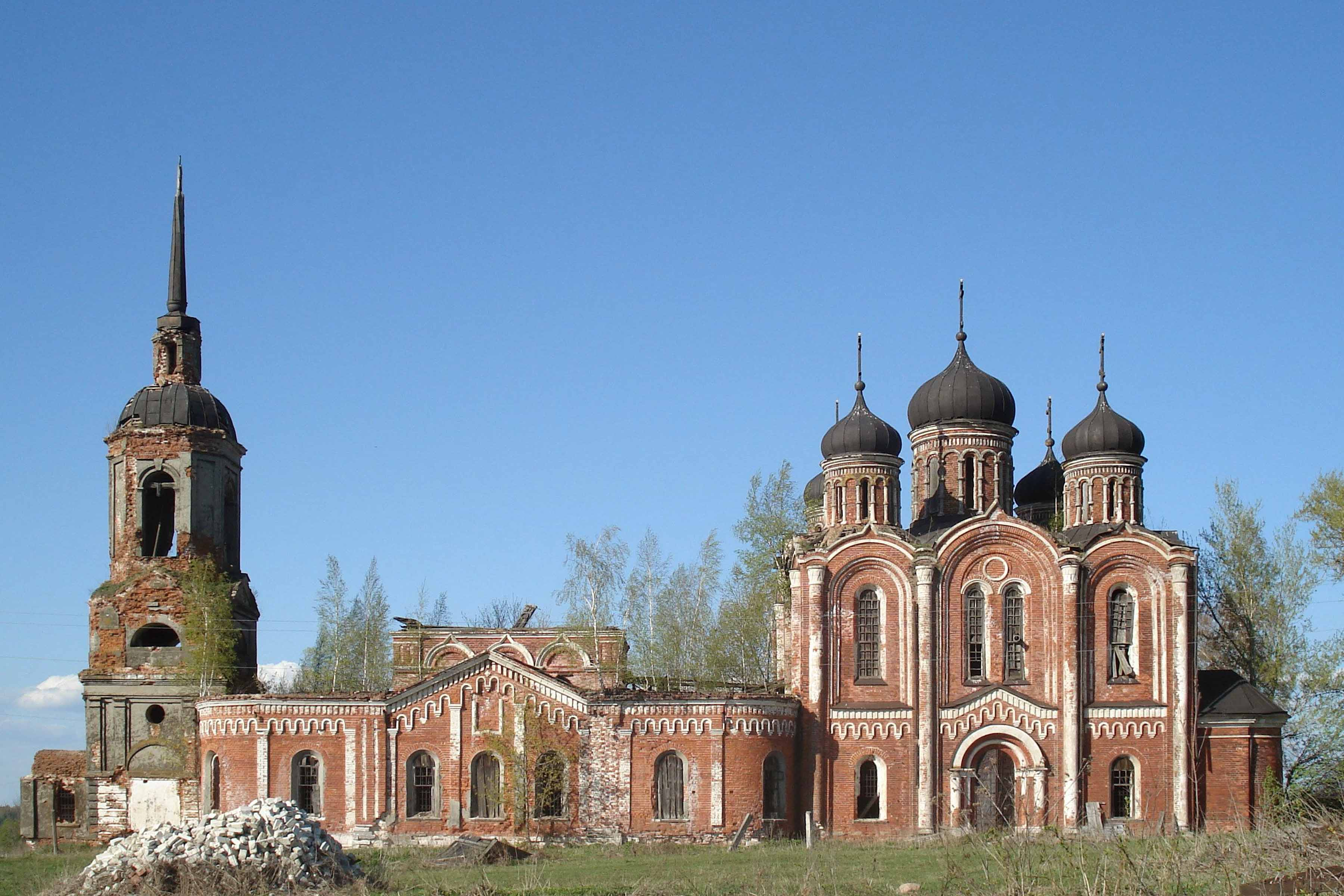
Krasno. Trinity Church, 1860-1867

== History ==
=== 17th century ===
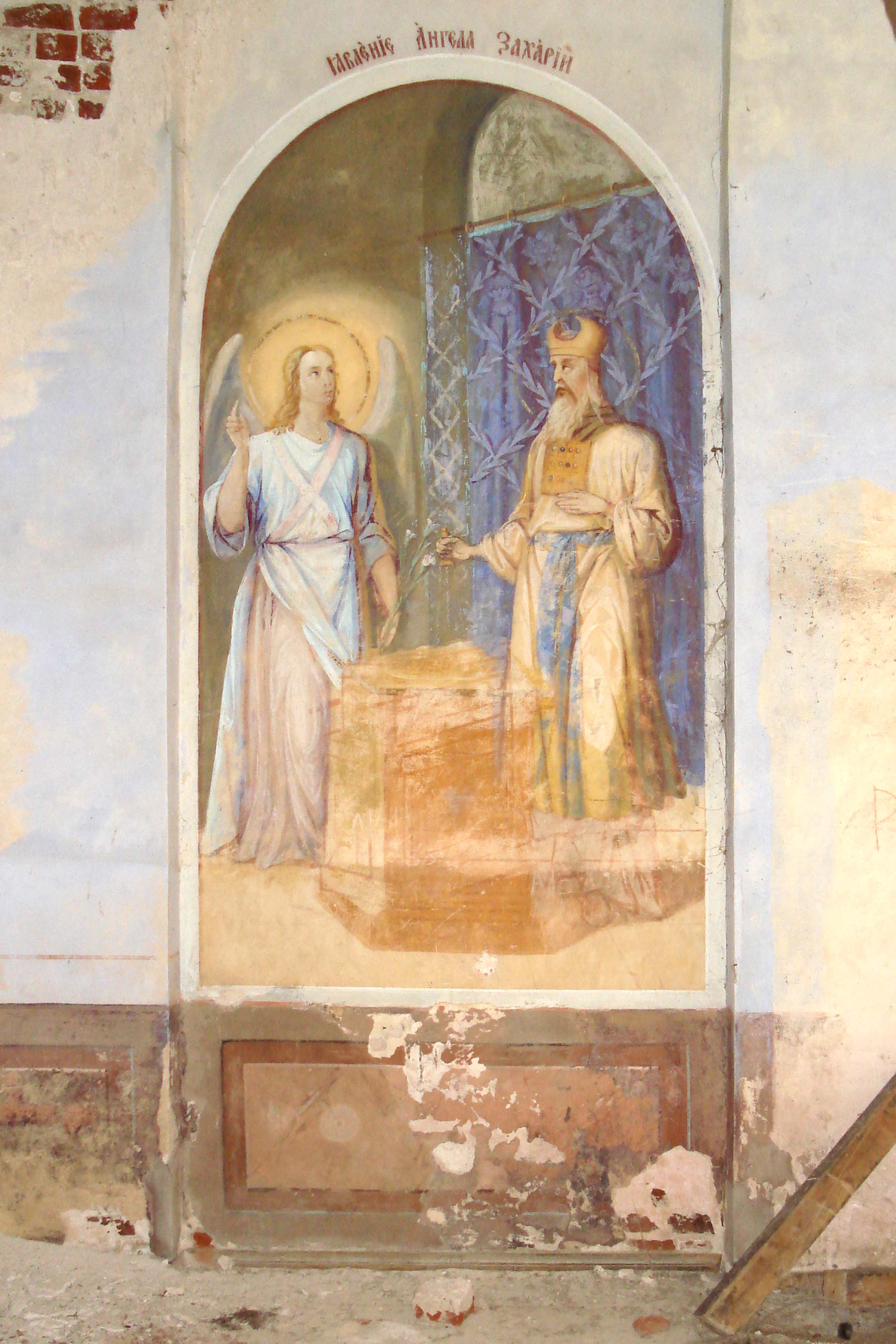
Trinity Church. Annunciation of the Angel to Zechariah. One of the few remaining wall-paintings.

The date when the church was built in Krasno is not known. However, the records indicate that a wooden church already existed there in the 17th century. The 1676 tax books of the Ryazan eparchy describe the village as having the Saint Nicholas Church and several homesteads. The same book also states that a number of villages were included in the Krasno parish.

=== 18th century ===
The church existed in Krasno until 1776, by which time it had fallen into decay. Due to that, local landowner Senyavin petitioned bishop Ieronim of Vladimir for a blessing to construct a new, stone church. The church was built and consecrated in honor of Saint Nicholas, but it was small and cold. Since 1797, the liturgy was conducted in a warm wooden church in honor of the Theotokos of Vladimir, which has been obtained from Murom.

=== 19th century ===
In 1860-1863, the stone church was dismantled and re-built in a larger size. In 1866-1867, the refectory of the church was also disassembled and re-built. The architecture of the new five-domed church was described as magnificent and graceful. The church had three side chapels—the main one being the Trinity altar, located in a warm refectory. The other two were the chapels of Saint Nicholas and the Theotokos of Vladimir.

== Schools ==
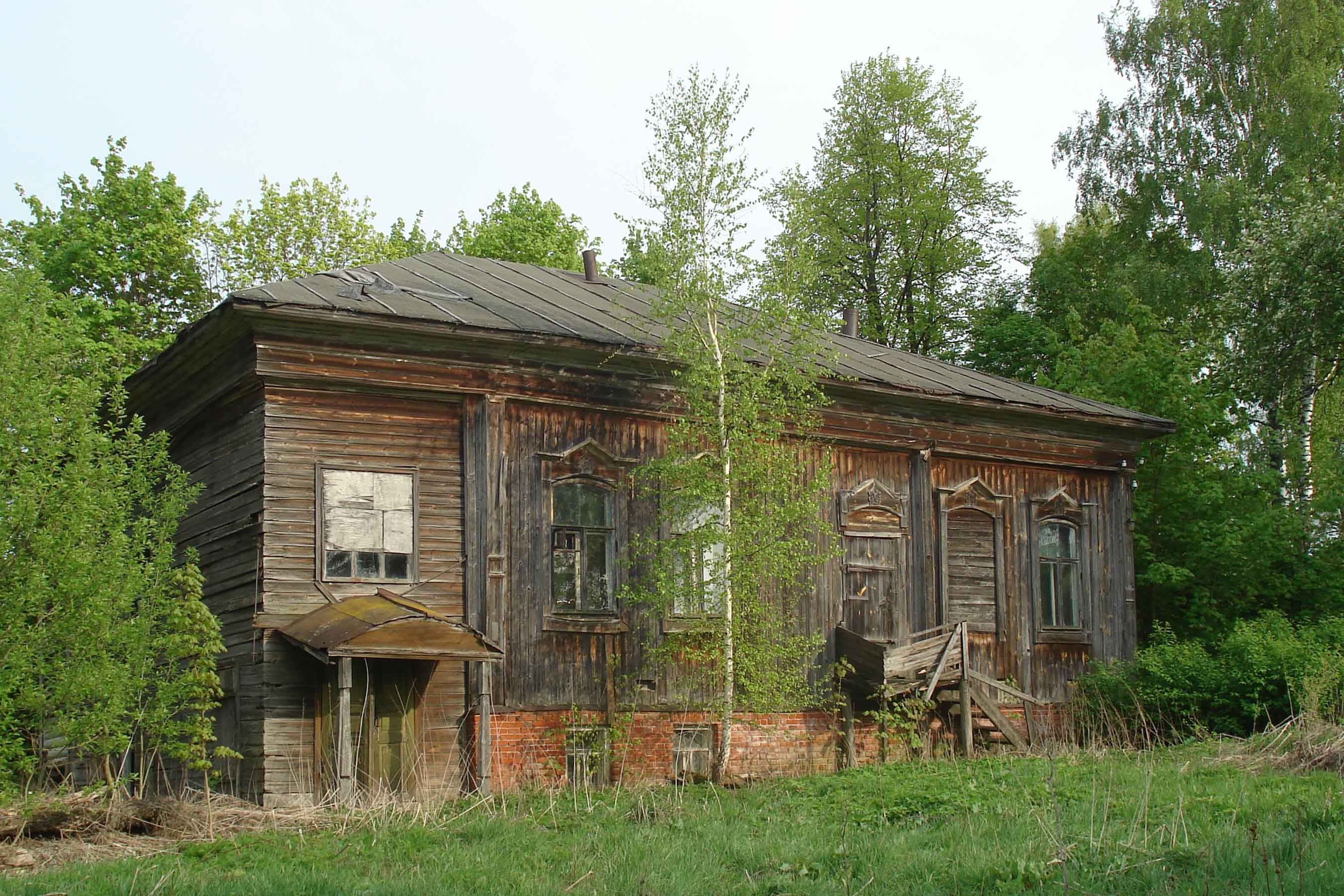
The building of the former zemstvo primary school

Zemstvo primary school was founded in the village in 1874. In 1898, fifty-eight students studied in the school. In 1896, a second, female parochial school in which nineteen female students studied, opened in Krasno.

During Soviet times, Krasno had an elementary school, which was closed in the early 1960s.

== Modern-day Krasno ==
Presently, the village of Krasno consists of two lines of houses looking opposite each other, forming a very wide street, one end of which ends abruptly as a ravine going into the Dobrushka River. Village facilities are very limited—there are no businesses or stores. The nearest shopping facility is located in the village of Shchedrino, about 3 kilometres (1.9 mi) away. Krasno is not telephonized; the nearest payphone is also in Shchedrino.

All in all, there are about fifty houses in Krasno. The majority of them are used only in summer. During winter months, Krasno's population falls to about seven people.

== Famous people ==
- Ioann (Smirnov) (1884–1919), archbishop of Ryazan and Zaraysk, theologian; born in Krasno
- Yury Myakinkov (1929–1997), radio physicist, winner of the Lenin Prize; spent his childhood and youth in Krasno
