= Sofia Zhukova =

Russian serial killer (1939–2020)

- Born: 1939; Zvyagino, Nizhny Novgorod Oblast, Soviet Union
- Died: 29 December 2020 (aged 80–81); Khabarovsk, Khabarovsk Krai, Russia
- Other names: "The Russian Granny Ripper" "Granny Sonya" "Sonya Sipatya"
- Conviction: Murder (3 counts)

Details
- Victims: 3
- Span of crimes: 2005–2019
- Country: Russia
- State: Khabarovsk
- Date apprehended: February 2019

Sofia Ivanovna Zhukova (Russian: Софья Ивановна Жукова; 1939 – 29 December 2020) was a Russian serial killer who committed three murders between 2005 and 2019. At the time of her last crime, she was 80 years old, making her the oldest serial killer in the history of Russia and the Soviet Union. Some sources claim that Zhukova partially ate her victims. She died of COVID-19 before trial and was found guilty posthumously.

== Biography ==
Zhukova was born in 1939 in the village of Zvyagino, Nizhny Novgorod Oblast. She had no education, could hardly read or write, and worked as a labourer. Later, she moved to Khabarovsk, where she settled on the outskirts of the city, in the village of Berezovka, got married, and gave birth to two sons. In 2005, Zhukova's husband died. After that, changes took place in her psyche, which led to the murders. Zhukova often clashed with neighbours and threatened them, but no one took her threats seriously.

=== Crimes ===
On 14 December 2005, Zhukova hacked her eight-year-old neighbor Anastasia Alexeenko to death with an ax, dismembered her body, and threw the remains into the street in a bag. She later explained the crime by saying that the girl made too much noise. Two weeks later, one of the residents discovered the dismembered remains of the girl. Nobody suspected Zhukova of committing the crime.

On the night of 28 January to 29 January 2019, Zhukova hacked to death with an ax and dismembered 57-year-old janitor Vasily Shlyakhtich, who had rented her room. His chopped-up remains were found in the garbage by ten-year-old children.

=== Investigation and trial ===
Initially, Zhukova confessed only to the murder of the janitor, but later told her cellmates in the pre-trial detention centre about the murders of a girl and a friend. The inmates then told investigators. Soon after, Zhukova pleaded guilty, explaining in detail the circumstances and reasons for each murder, but after a couple of months, she retracted her confession. A forensic psychological and psychiatric examination found Zhukova to be sane. At the end of December 2020, she fell ill with COVID-19 and was admitted to the city hospital No. 10 in the city of Khabarovsk, where she died on 29 December. She was found guilty of the three murders posthumously.

== See also ==
- List of Russian serial killers
- List of serial killers by number of victims
