= Abramovo, Krasnooktyabrsky District, Nizhny Novgorod Oblast =

Abramovo Абрамово
- Village
- Location within Nizhny Novgorod Oblast Location within Russia
- Coordinates: 55°06′N 45°28′E
- Country: Russia
- Region: Nizhny Novgorod Oblast
- District: Krasnooktyabrsky District
- Time zone: UTC+3:00

Abramovo (Russian: Абра́мово) is a rural locality (a village) in Sarginsky Selsoviet of Krasnooktyabrsky District, Nizhny Novgorod Oblast, Russia.

== Population ==
The population was 116 as of 2010.

== Geography ==
The village is located on the right bank of the Pyana River, 41 km south of Urazovka (the district's administrative centre) by road. Sarga is the nearest rural locality.
