= Zvyagintsev =

Zvyagintsev (Russian: Звягинцев) is a Russian surname. Notable people with the surname include:

- Andrey Zvyagintsev (born 1964), Russian film director
- Vadim Zvjaginsev (born 1976), Russian chess player
- Vasily Zvyagintsev (1944–2016), Russian author
- Viktor Zvyahintsev (1950–2022), Soviet retired footballer
- David Zvyagintsev (1999-2026), Tyumen drug dealer

== See also ==
- Zvyagin
