= Dolomitne =

Dolomitne Доломітне
- Location of Dolomitne within Ukraine Dolomitne (Ukraine)
- Coordinates: 48.424167°N 38.140278°E
- Country: Ukraine
- Oblast: Donetsk Oblast
- District: Bakhmut Raion

Area
  - Total: 0.186 km^{2} (0.072 sq mi)
- Elevation: 243 m (797 ft)

Population (2001 census)
  - Total: 106
  - Density: 570/km^{2} (1,480/sq mi)
- Time zone: UTC+2 (EET)
  - Summer (DST): UTC+3 (EEST)
- Postal code: 84573
- Area code: +380 6274

Dolomitne (Ukrainian: Доломітне; Russian: Доломитное) is a settlement in Bakhmut Raion (district) in Donetsk Oblast of eastern Ukraine, at 54.3 km NNE from the centre of Donetsk city.

== History ==
Before 1950, the settlement that is now Dolomitne was an unnamed worker's settlement near the dolomite mine near the town of Yama (now Siversk). On 27 January 1950, it was officially given the status of a settlement, with the name Dolomitne.

Part of the settlement was taken under control of pro-Russian forces during the War in Donbass, that started in 2014.

== Demographics ==
The settlement had 106 inhabitants in 2001; native language distribution as of the Ukrainian Census of 2001:

- Ukrainian: 35.85%
- Russian: 64.15%
