= Siversk =

City in Donetsk Oblast, Ukraine

Siversk Сіверськ
- City
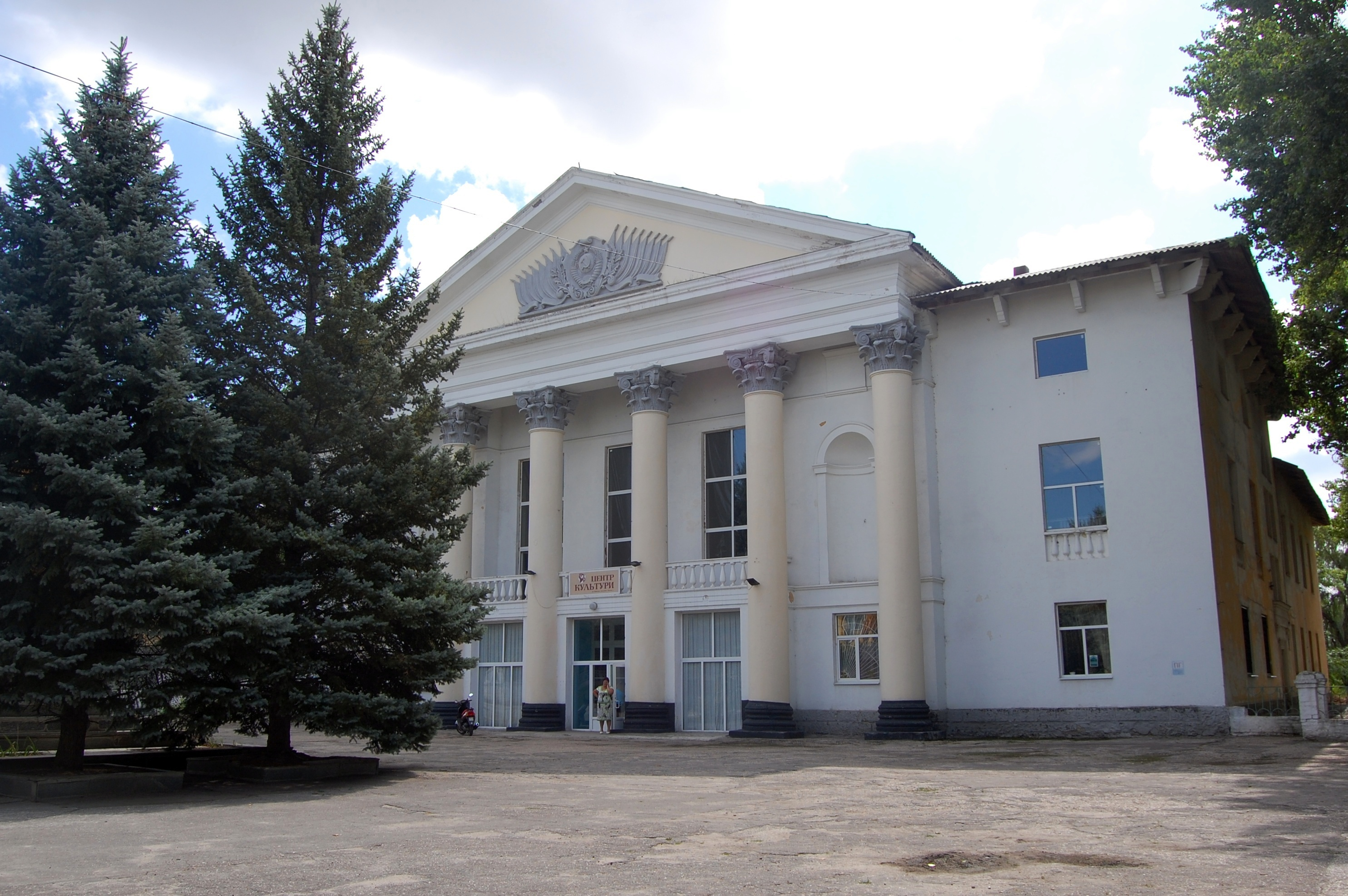
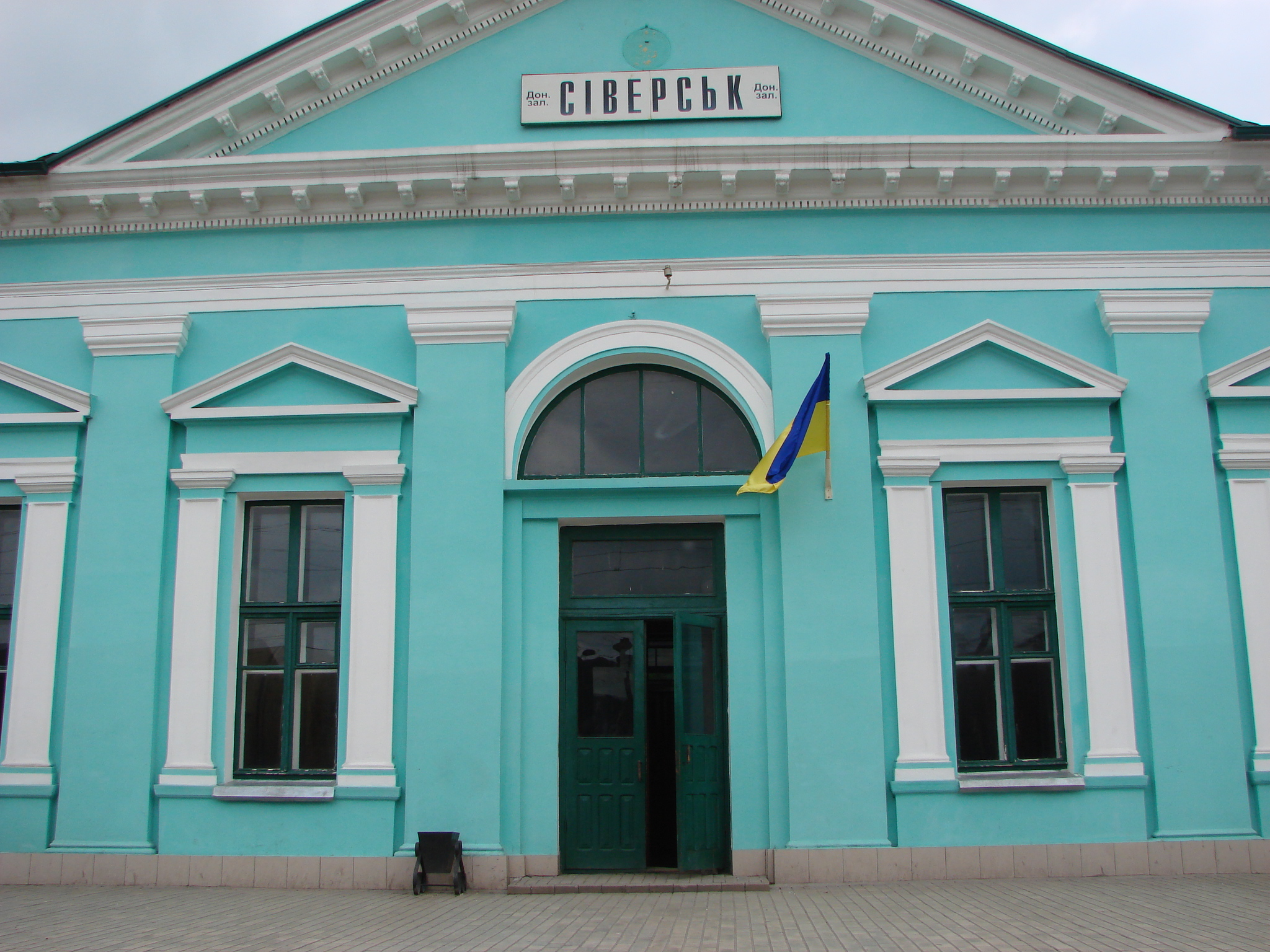
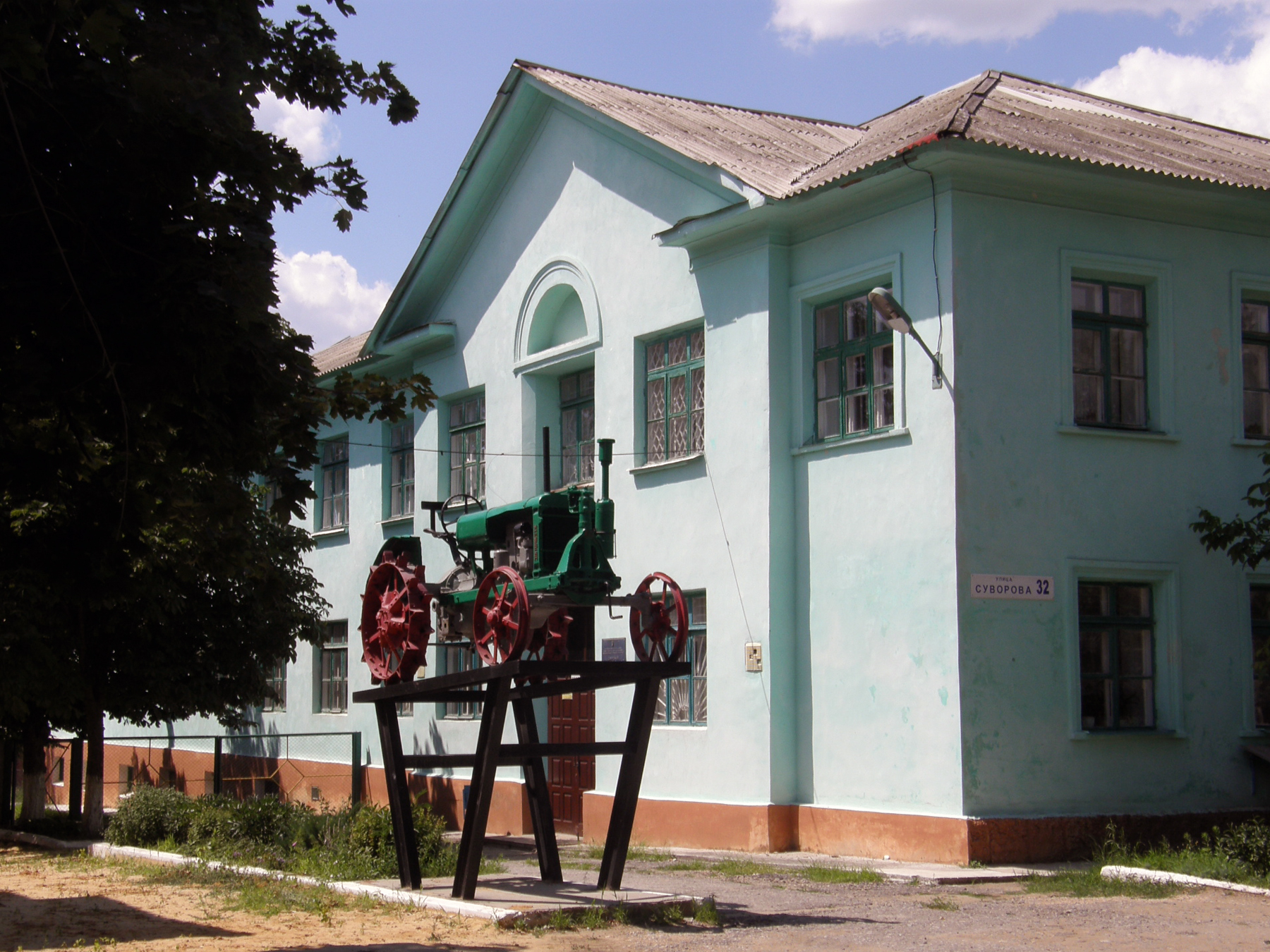
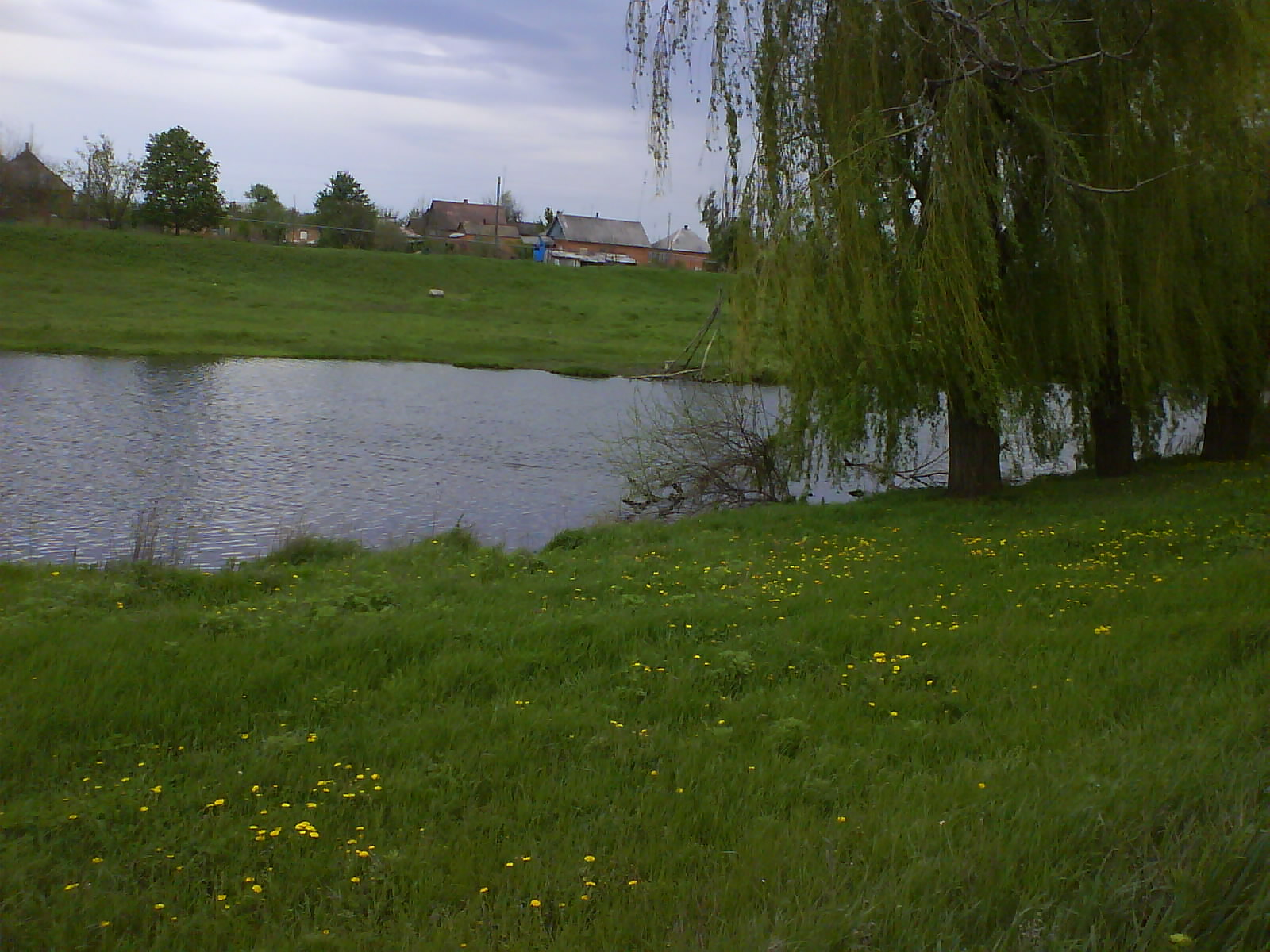
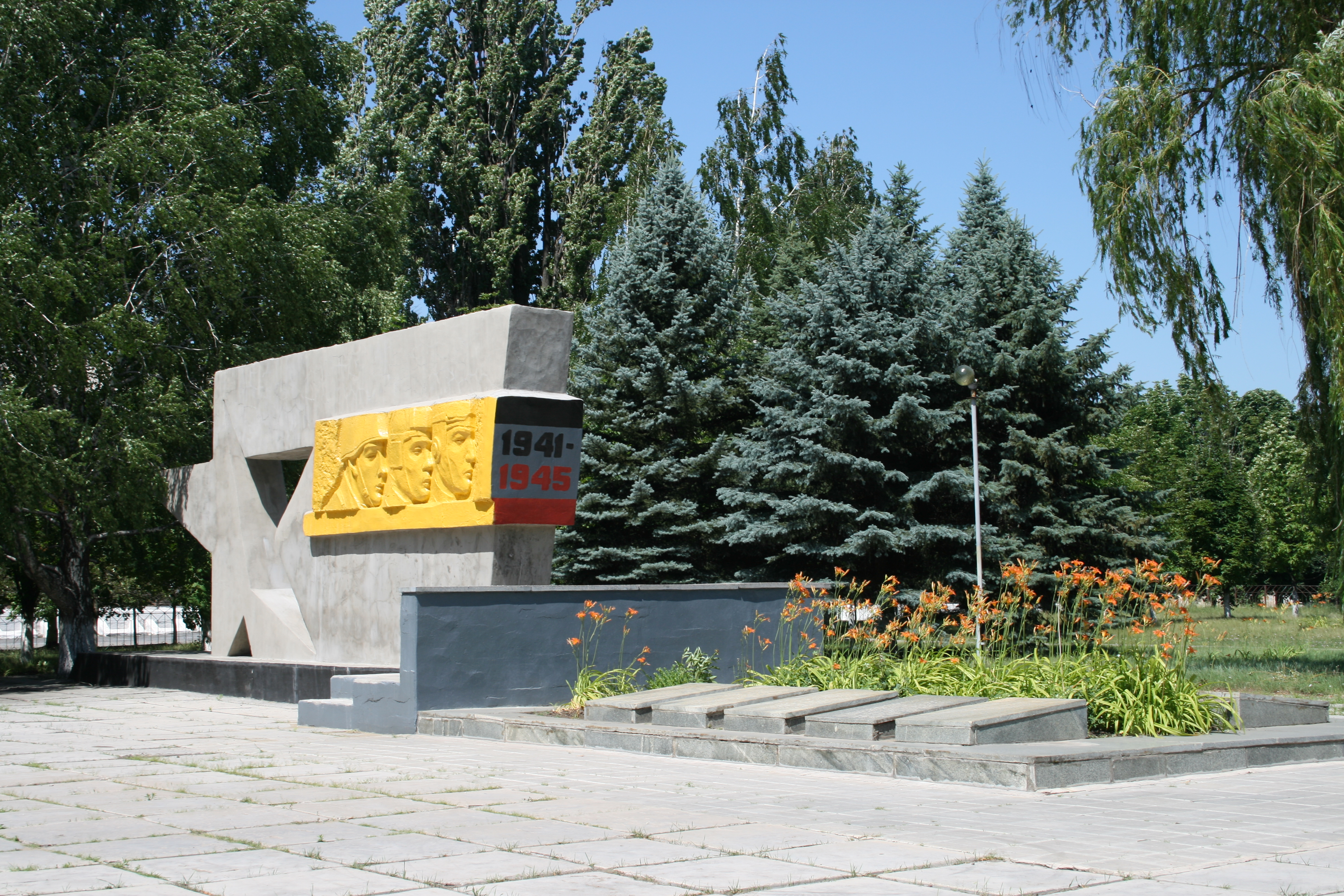
- Culture center Railway station Lyceum Bakhmutka river World War II Memorial

- Flag Coat of arms
- Interactive map of Siversk
- Location of Siversk Siversk (Ukraine)
- Coordinates: 48°51′47″N 38°5′50″E
- Country: Ukraine
- Oblast: Donetsk Oblast
- Raion: Bakhmut Raion
- Hromada: Siversk urban hromada
- Foundation: 1913
- City rights: 1961

Area
  - Total: 11 km^{2} (4.2 sq mi)
- Elevation: 72 m (236 ft)

Population (2022)
  - Total: 10,875
  - Density: 990/km^{2} (2,600/sq mi)
- Postal code: 84522-84524
- Area code: +380 6274

Siversk (Ukrainian: Сіверськ, IPA: [ˈs⁽ʲ⁾iwersʲk]; Russian: Северск, romanized: Seversk), formerly known as Yama (Яма) until 1973, is a city in Bakhmut Raion, Donetsk Oblast, Ukraine. Its economy has traditionally been based around the mining and processing of dolomite. In January 2022, it had an estimated population of 10,875. It is the administrative center of Siversk urban hromada, one of the hromadas of Ukraine.

During the Russo-Ukrainian War, it has been a site of repeated fighting, accelerating the economic and demographic downturn the city has suffered since the 1990s. The fighting for the city during the 2022 battle of Donbas of the Russo-Ukrainian war destroyed much of the city, and only about 1,000 people remain in the city as of July 2023. It has been under Russian occupation since December 2025.

== Geography ==
Siversk is located in the historical, cultural, and economic Donbas region of eastern Ukraine. It is located 36 kilometres (22 mi) northeast of Bakhmut. The city lies at the bottom of a lowland, in a river valley, surrounded on all sides by smaller settlements.

== History ==
=== Preceding settlements ===
Archeologists have discovered human settlements on the territory of modern Siversk dating back to the Stone Age. At different times throughout history, the area has been inhabited by Sarmatians, Goths, Huns, Avars, Alans, Bulgarians, Slavs, Khazars and Cumans. The land was conquered by the Mongol Empire during the Mongol invasion of Kievan Rus' in the mid-13th century.

In the 16th century, the land on the banks of the Siversky Donets river was colonized by the Zaporizhzhian Cossacks. They made several small settlements, including one named Shokovy Yar. Shovkovy Yar would go on to evolve into the villages of Chornohorivka and Stary Mlyn. After the liquidation of the Zaporozhian Sich in the late 18th century, Catherine the Great began a program by which large numbers of Eastern Orthodox residents of the Ottoman Empire and the Austrian Empire were resettled in the Donbas region. This colony was known as Slavo-Serbia. Stary Mlyn became the property of nobleman Rajko Preradović, and the settlement was named Radivonivka after him. This name later evolved into another name, Rodionivka.

On the bank of the Kamianka river, a tributary of the Bakhmutka, a village named Kamianske was founded, named after the river. In 1881, an agricultural school was opened in Kamianske. Volodymyr Sosiura would study at this school. In 1910, the Yama railway station was built.

=== Founding and 20th-century history ===
In 1913, a dolomite plant was built near the station, to process dolomite from the nearby mine. This year is generally considered to be the "official" year of the founding of Siversk. The same year, a worker's settlement named Yama was founded, on the bank of the Yama river. Workers of the mine and the railway station lived in the settlement. The toponym Yama literally means "pit", in reference to the deep river valley.

The area saw fighting during the Ukrainian War of Independence. The settlements were occupied by the Central Powers during the 1918 Central Powers invasion of Ukraine, and handed over to the Ukrainian State, before eventually being captured by the Bolsheviks. Afterwards, Yama was administratively part of the Donets Governorate of Ukraine.

The oldest surviving school was built in Siversk in 1927. The area saw fighting again during World War II.

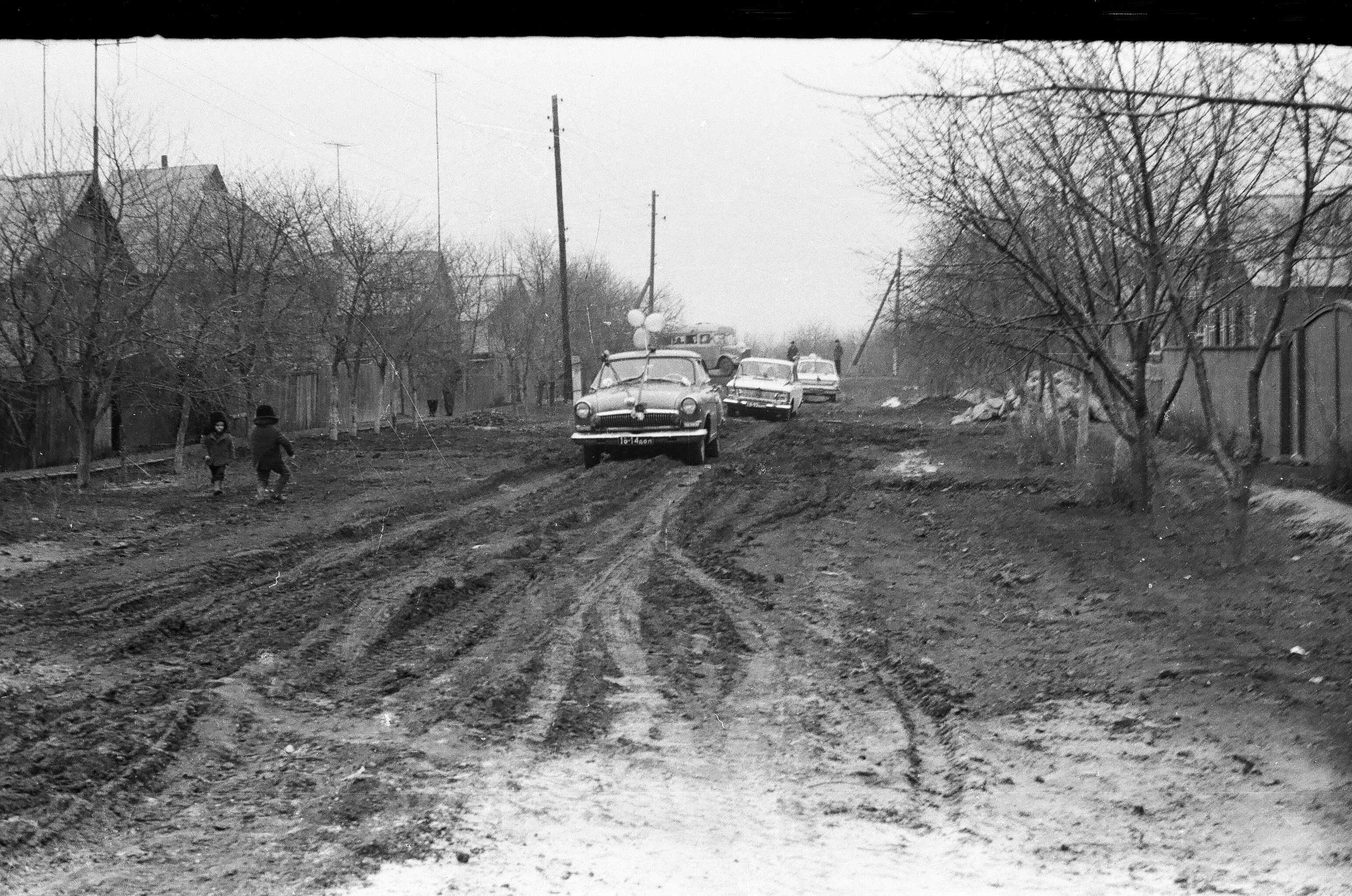
A street in Siversk in the 1970s–80s

On 27 January 1950, most of the disparate minor settlements – including Rodionivka and Chornohorivka – were merged into Yama. The worker's settlement near the dolomite mine was excluded from this, instead becoming the settlement Dolomitne. Yama was part of Yama Raion until 10 September 1959, when the raion was abolished, and its territory, including Yama, was merged into Artemivsk Raion.

Yama received city status in 1961, and was renamed to Siversk on 2 August 1973. The name "Siversk" is derived from the Siversky Donets river. In 1980, a museum was opened about Volodymyr Sosiura, the poet who had visited the area.

In the wake of the dissolution of the Soviet Union in 1991, Siversk experienced the economic decline that affected many countries of the former USSR. The dolomite plant was closed in 2008 after the exhaustion of the resources in the mine. The local farm went bankrupt, and the economy entered a depression. The population began to decline, leading to Siversk becoming "a hopelessly subsidized city of pensioners."

=== Russo-Ukrainian War ===
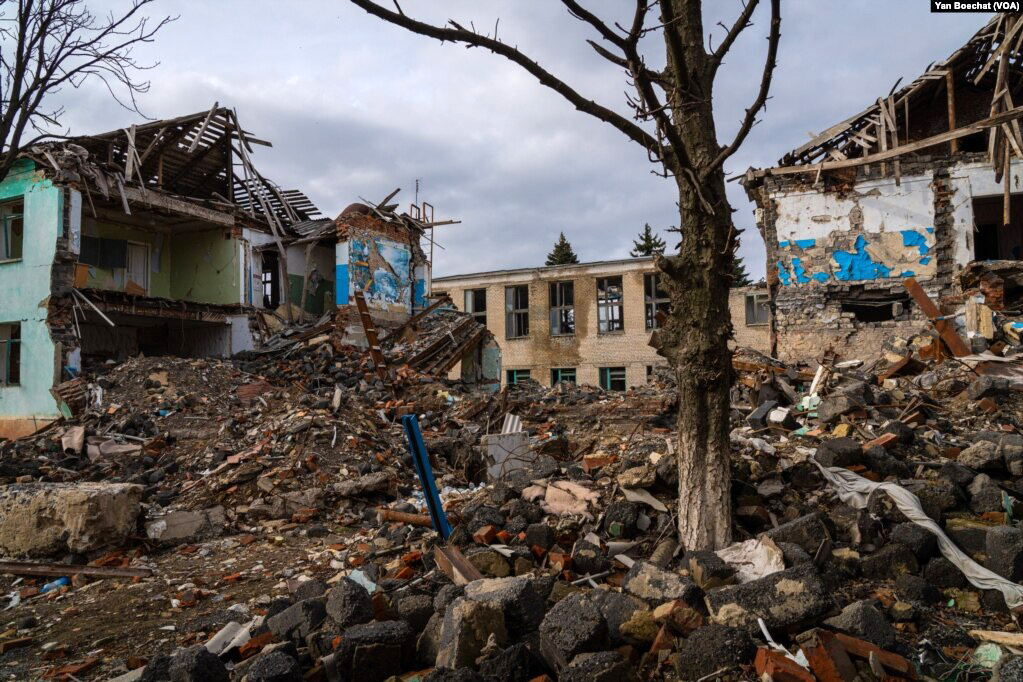
Destroyed buildings in the city after the 2022 battle of Siversk

In April 2014, during the beginnings of the war in Donbas, pro-Russian separatists seized control of several cities and towns in the Donbas, including Siversk. Ukrainian forces approached the city and began to encircle it, forcing the separatists to flee. On 10 July, Ukrainian forces secured the town from the separatists.

Despite the end of actual fighting in the city itself, the trend of economic and population decline accelerated, and the city remained a "war zone" for the remainder of the war in Donbas, though most of the residents of the city did not flee at the time. As of 2016, Siversk was located about 50 kilometres (31 mi) from the frontline.

After the full-scale Russian invasion of Ukraine in 2022, Siversk became a frontline city in the fighting again. In July 2022, the battle of Siversk began between Ukrainian forces and Russia, allied with its proxy separatist forces. The Russian goal was to break through to nearby Bakhmut by taking Siversk, as well as minor nearby settlements like Verkhniokamianske. Siversk itself fell into humanitarian crisis, with running water and electricity services being shut down and most buildings damaged. 70% of buildings in the city were reportedly in "ruins". However, Russian forces failed to ever actually reach the city by 20 July. After Ukraine's 2022 Kharkiv counteroffensive, a United States military official said on 12 September that Russia was moving its focus from Siversk to the battle of Bakhmut. On 28 June 2023, Siversk officially launched a sister city program with Weston, Connecticut. Siversk had not recovered from the war damage, with only about 1,000 residents remaining in the city as of July 2023.

Between September and October 2025, as part of Northeast Donetsk Oblast campaign, Russian forces approached the city from the north and south, having previously reached it from the east. Further advances on the south-western outskirts of the Serebriansky forest and its capture along adjacent village meant that the route connecting Siversk with Lyman came under Russian fire control.

On 11 December 2025, Russia's Chief of the General Staff Valery Gerasimov said that Russian forces had captured Siversk. The Ukrainian army's eastern command denied Russian claims. The Institute for the Study of War reported that Russian forces likely seized the city by 21 December after 41 months of fighting, citing a Ukrainian military observer. On 23 December, Russian seizure of the city was confirmed by the General Staff of AFU. Siversk is considered strategically important because it is part of a defence line protecting the last major urban area in Donbass controlled by Ukrainian forces, the capture of which enables Russian advances further towards the cities of Sloviansk and Kramatorsk.

== Economy ==
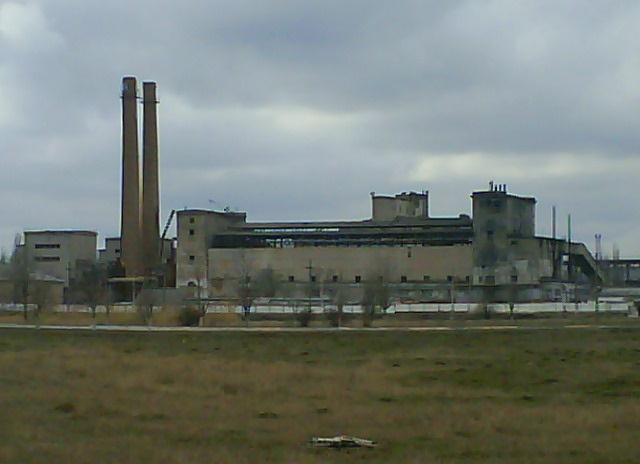
Dolomite plant

The main economy of Siversk has traditionally been dolomite mining and processing since 1913, until 2008 when the mines were exhausted. The mineral was used in metallurgy, construction, and the chemical industry, and it was the main source of income to the city.

Siversk also contains the "Yamskyi" state farm, a milk factory, and a sewing factory.

== Education ==
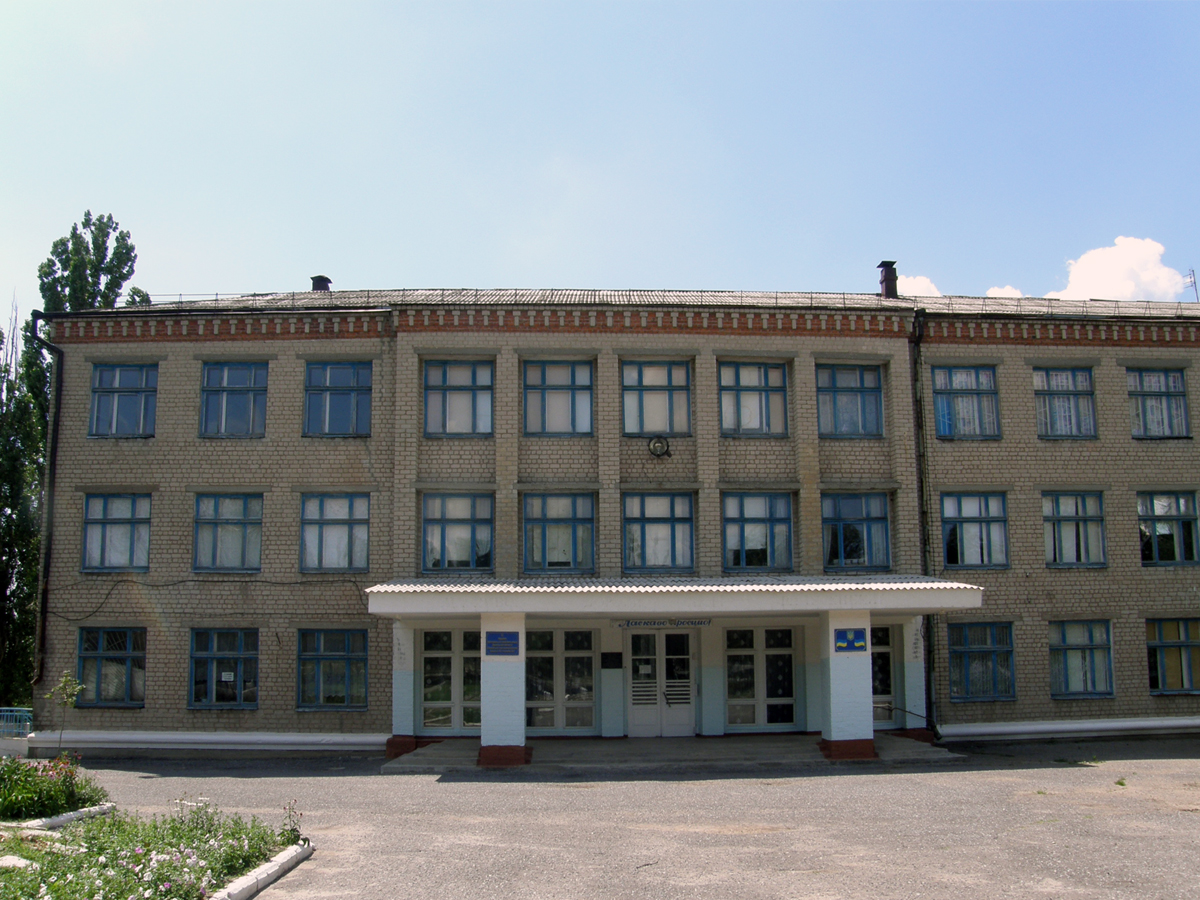
School no. 2

As of 1970, Siversk had two secondary schools, a primary school, a boarding school, a music school, and an agricultural school. There were eight kindergartens and nurseries, and four libraries. However, by 2016, there were only three schools left. The Seversky Vocational Lyceum (Suvorov Street) and the Dolomitchik Sports and Fitness Complex (Mira Avenue) are also active.

In the city, main cultural institutions are a Museum of the poet Volodymyr Sosiura, a cultural center, a children's and youth creativity center, three libraries, an aesthetic education school and sports and fitness center.

== Infrastructure ==
Public transport in the city is minimal. There is one bus that travels in a loop around the city, and "if it breaks down, passengers walk". Ukrainian media have said that the Ukrainian joke about roads in eastern Ukraine having been "bombed even before the war" applies to Siversk.

== Demographics ==
Historical population

Year	Pop.	±% p.a.
1939	5,473	—
1959	11,948	+3.98%
1970	14,168	+1.56%
1979	14,544	+0.29%
1989	14,019	−0.37%
1992	14,100	+0.19%
1998	14,000	−0.12%
2001	14,393	+0.93%
2003	14,113	−0.98%
2004	13,757	−2.52%
2005	13,478	−2.03%
2006	13,253	−1.67%
2007	13,112	−1.06%
2008	12,916	−1.49%
2009	12,742	−1.35%

Year	Pop.	±% p.a.
2010	12,608	−1.05%
2011	12,392	−1.71%
2012	12,252	−1.13%
2013	12,145	−0.87%
2014	12,036	−0.90%
2015	11,891	−1.20%
2016	11,765	−1.06%
2017	11,645	−1.02%
2018	11,495	−1.29%
2019	11,378	−1.02%
2020	11,231	−1.29%
2021	11,068	−1.45%
2022	11,875	+7.29%
2023	1,000	−91.58%

As of the 2001 Ukrainian census, the population was 14,393 people, 76.7% of whom spoke Ukrainian as their native language. 81.23% of the residents identified as ethnic Ukrainians, 16.95% claimed to be Russian. The town is home to various smaller ethnic minorities, such as Belarusians, which account for roughly 1% of the population, as well as Greeks, Georgians and Azerbaijanis. The population has been declining since the 1990s, a trend which has greatly accelerated since the beginning of the war with Russia. After the destructive battle in 2022, there were large-scale evacuations, and only about 1,000 people remain in the city as of July 2023.

Ethnic groups in Siversk
Ethnic groups	percent
Ukrainians	81.23%
Russians	16.95%
Belarusians	0.78%
Azerbaijanis	0.14%
Georgians	0.12%
Greeks	0.09%

Native languages in Siversk
Languages	percent
Ukrainian	76.7%
Russian	22.6%
Belarusian	0.3%
others	0.1%

== Gallery ==
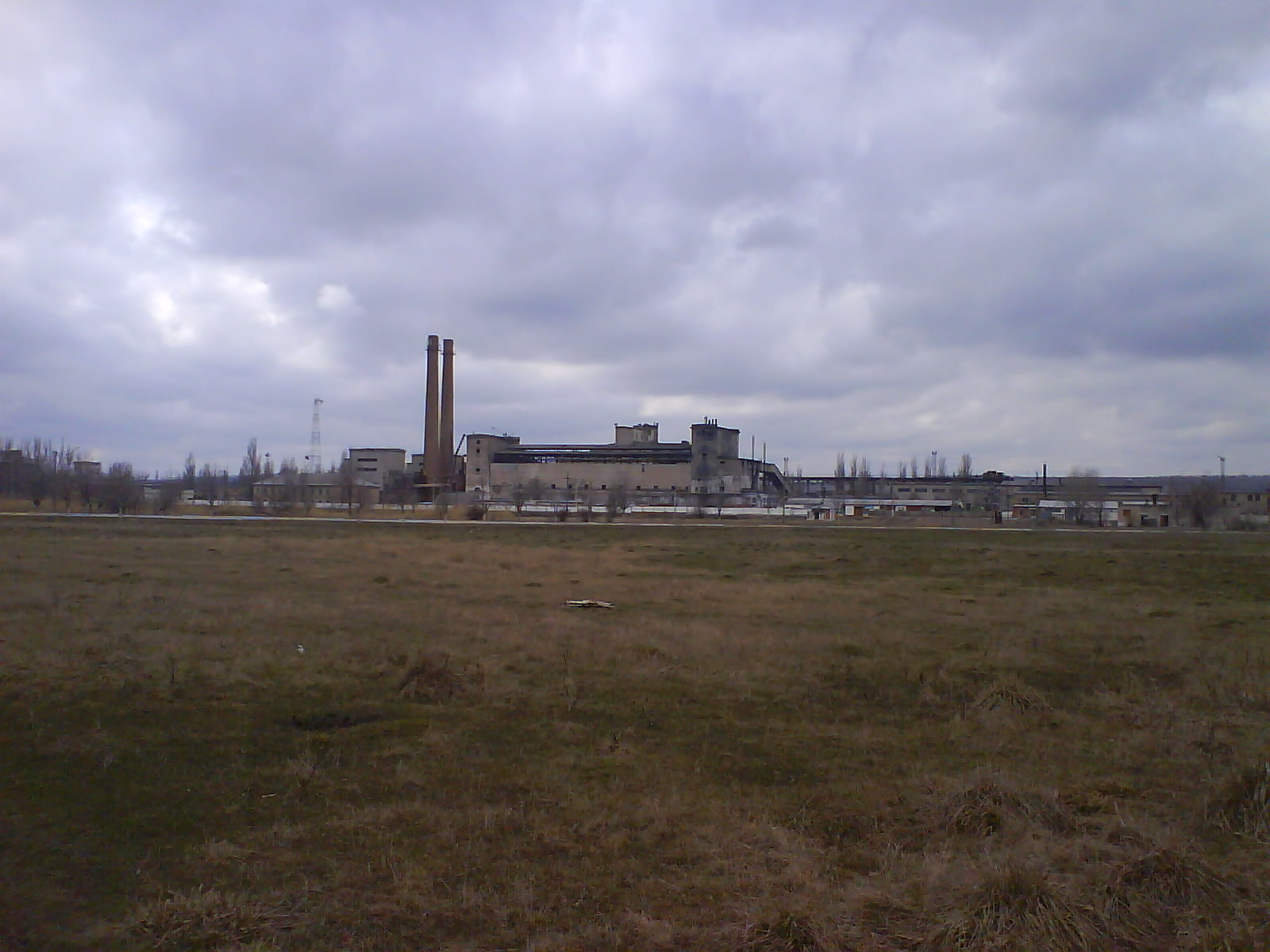
The dolomite plant in Siversk

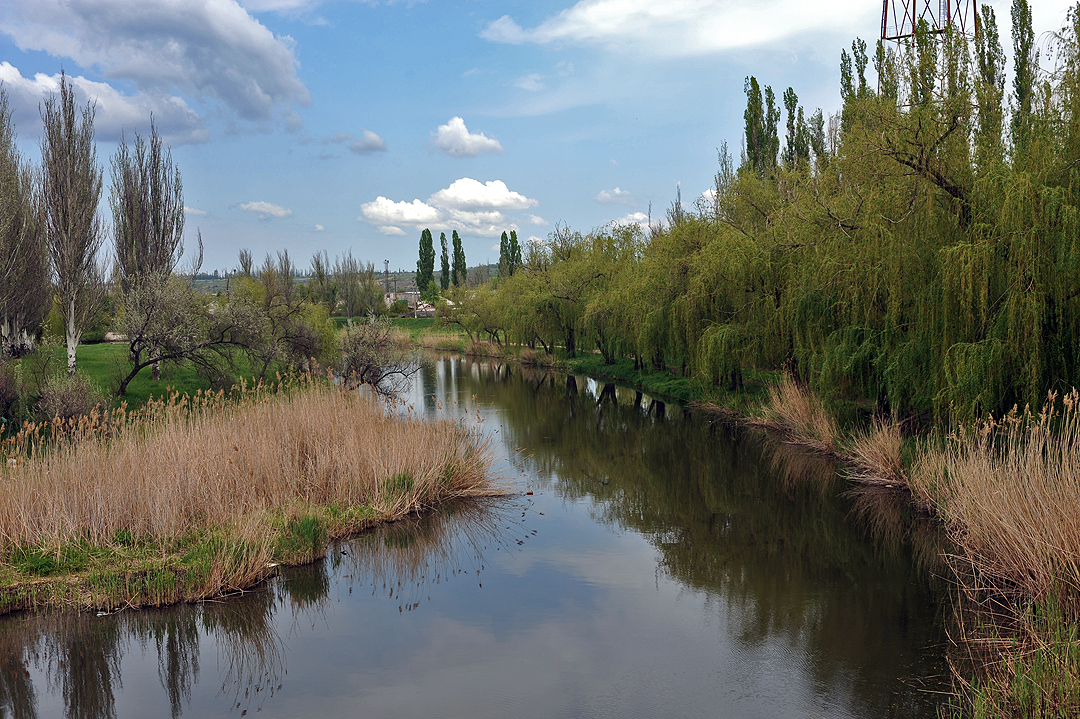
Bakhmutka river near Siversk

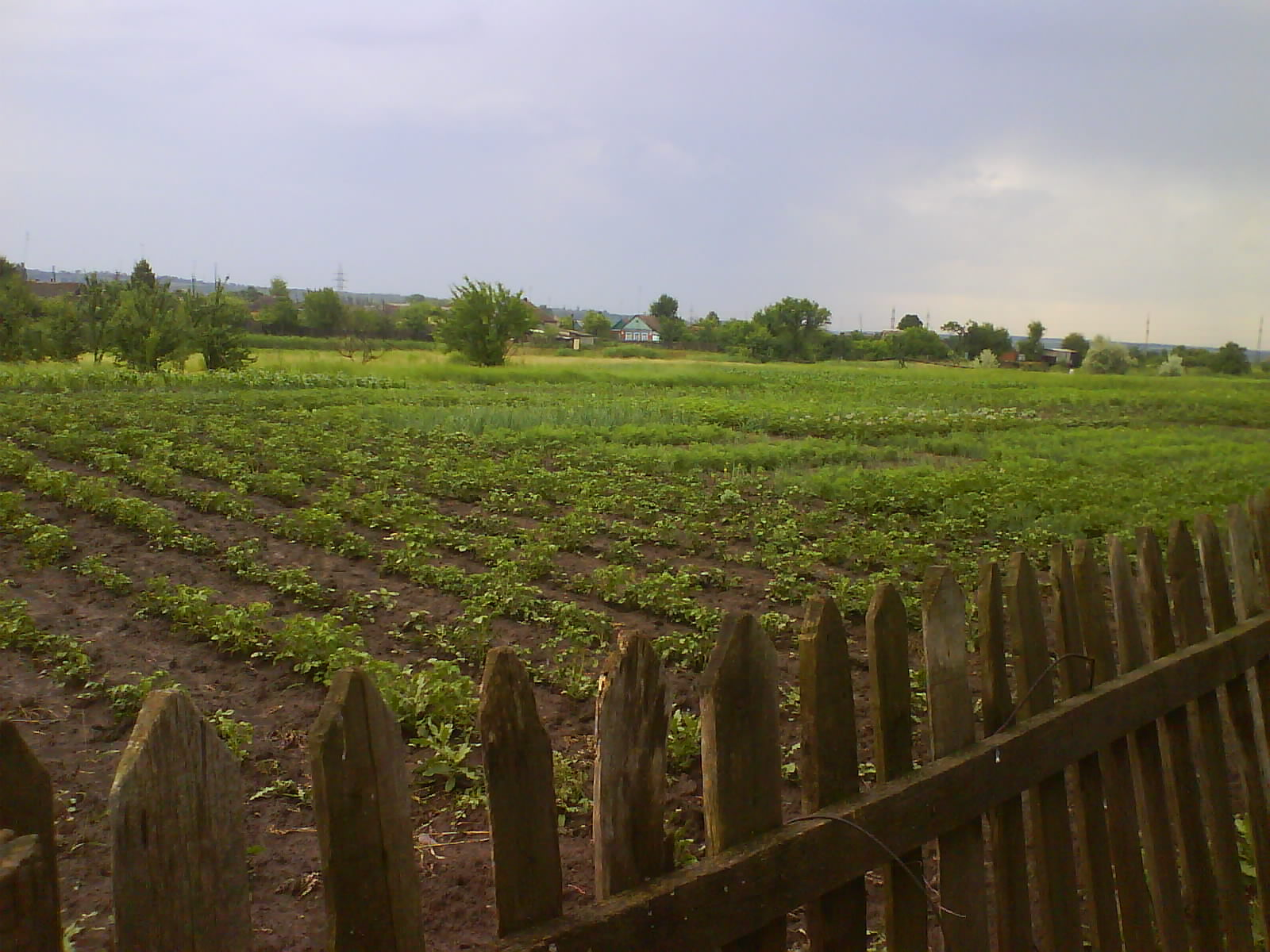
A typical vegetable garden along the Bakhmutka River in Siversk

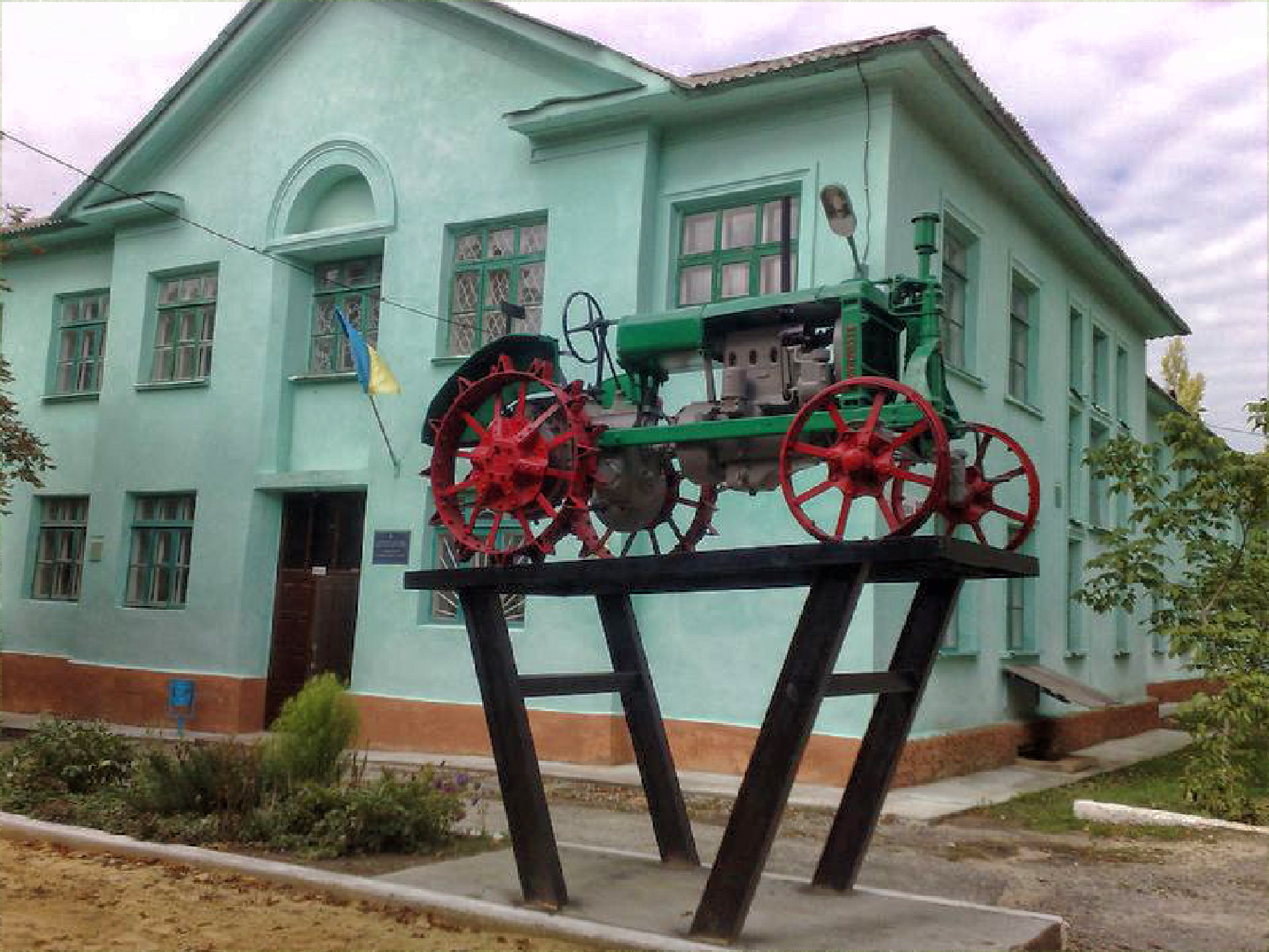
Monument to labor glory - "Universal" tractor in Siversk

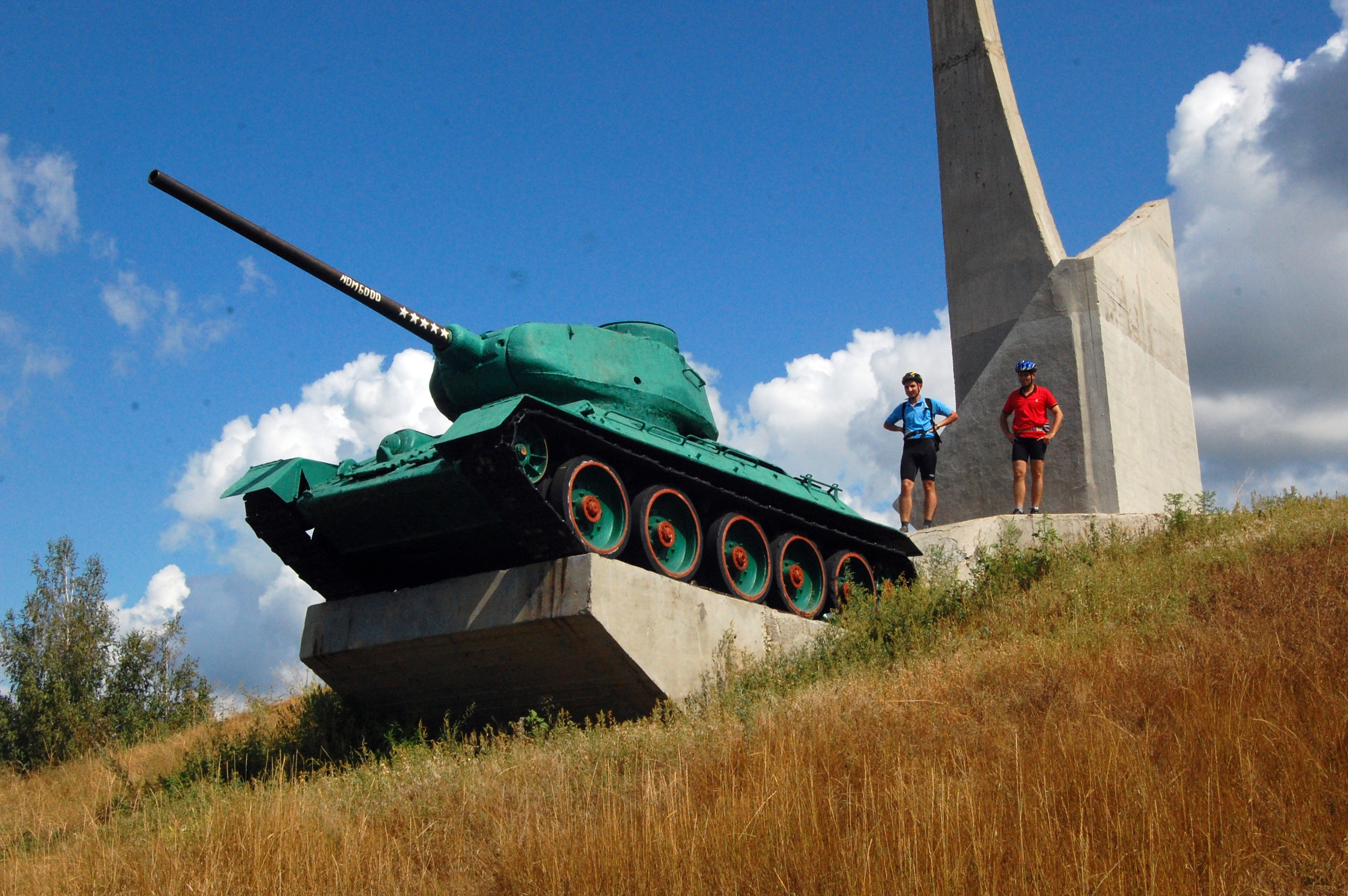
Memorial of the T-34 tank

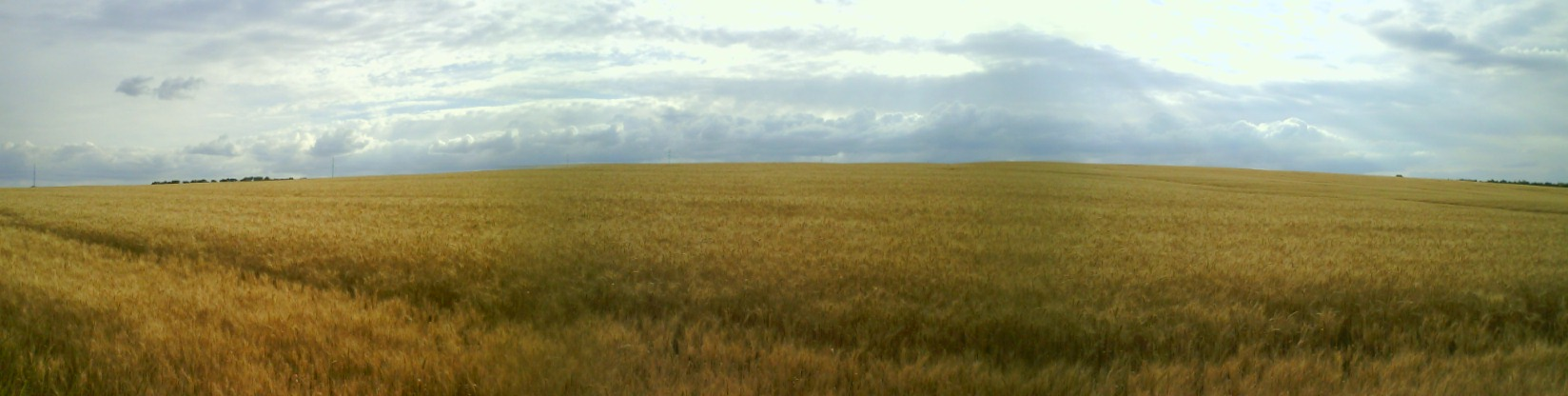
Panorama of a wheat field near Siversk

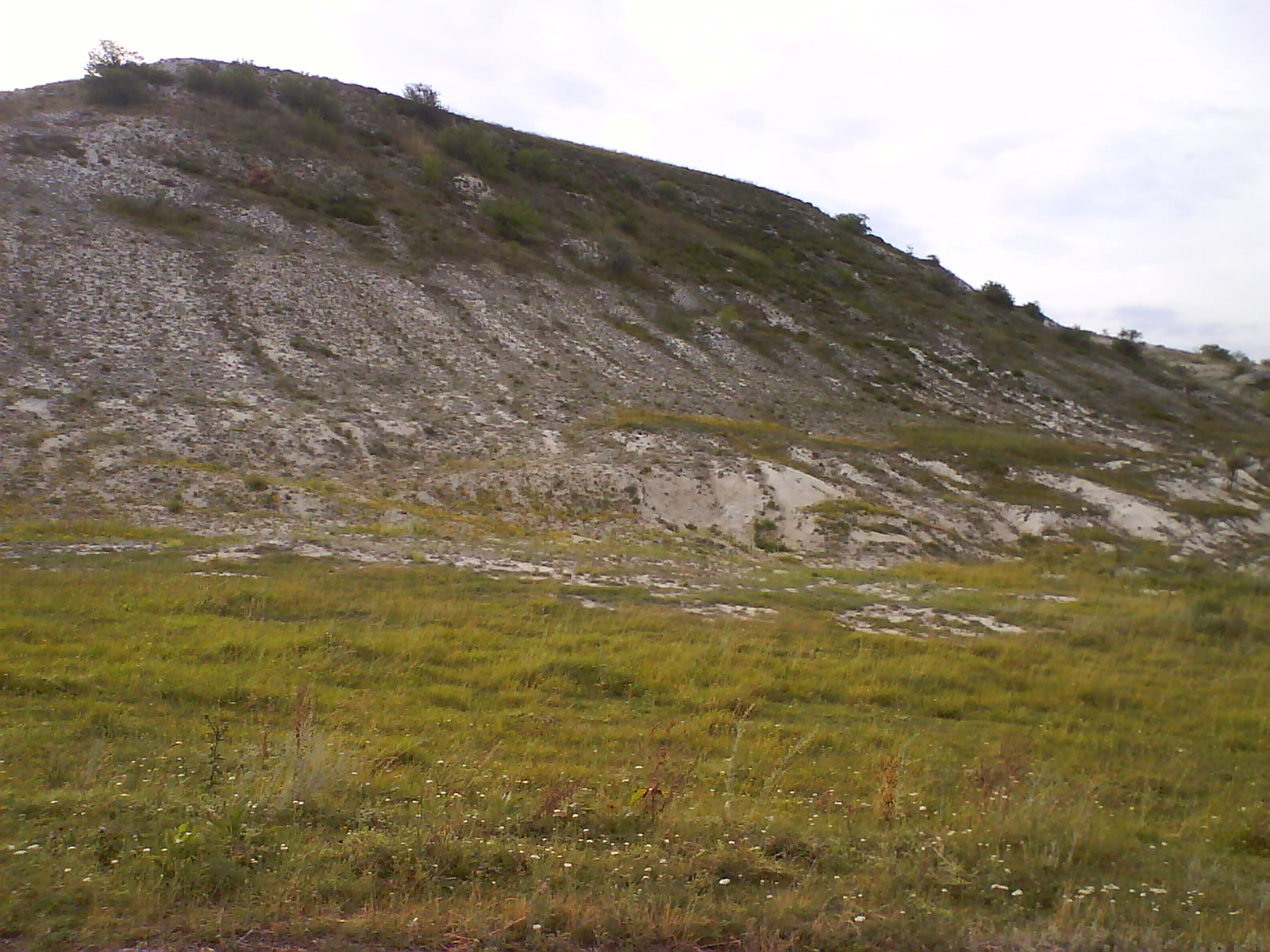
Photo of a chalk mountain near the city of Siversk

== Notable people ==
- Boris Koretsky (born 1961) — Soviet athlete, Olympic champion (1988) in fencing.
