= Zvyagino, Kazakovsky Selsoviet, Vachsky District, Nizhny Novgorod Oblast =

Zyvagino Звягино
- Derevnia
- Location within Nizhny Novgorod Oblast Location within Russia
- Coordinates: 55°43′50″N 42°45′55″E
- Country: Russia
- Region: Nizhny Novgorod Oblast
- District: Vachsky District
- Time zone: UTC+03:00

Zvyagino (Russian: Звягино) is a rural locality (a hamlet) in Kazakovsky Selsoviet, Vachsky District, Nizhny Novgorod Oblast, Russia. 558 (2010 census); 537 (2002 census);
