= Zvyagino, Chulkovsky Selsoviet, Vachsky District, Nizhny Novgorod Oblast =

Zyvagino Звягино
- Derevnia
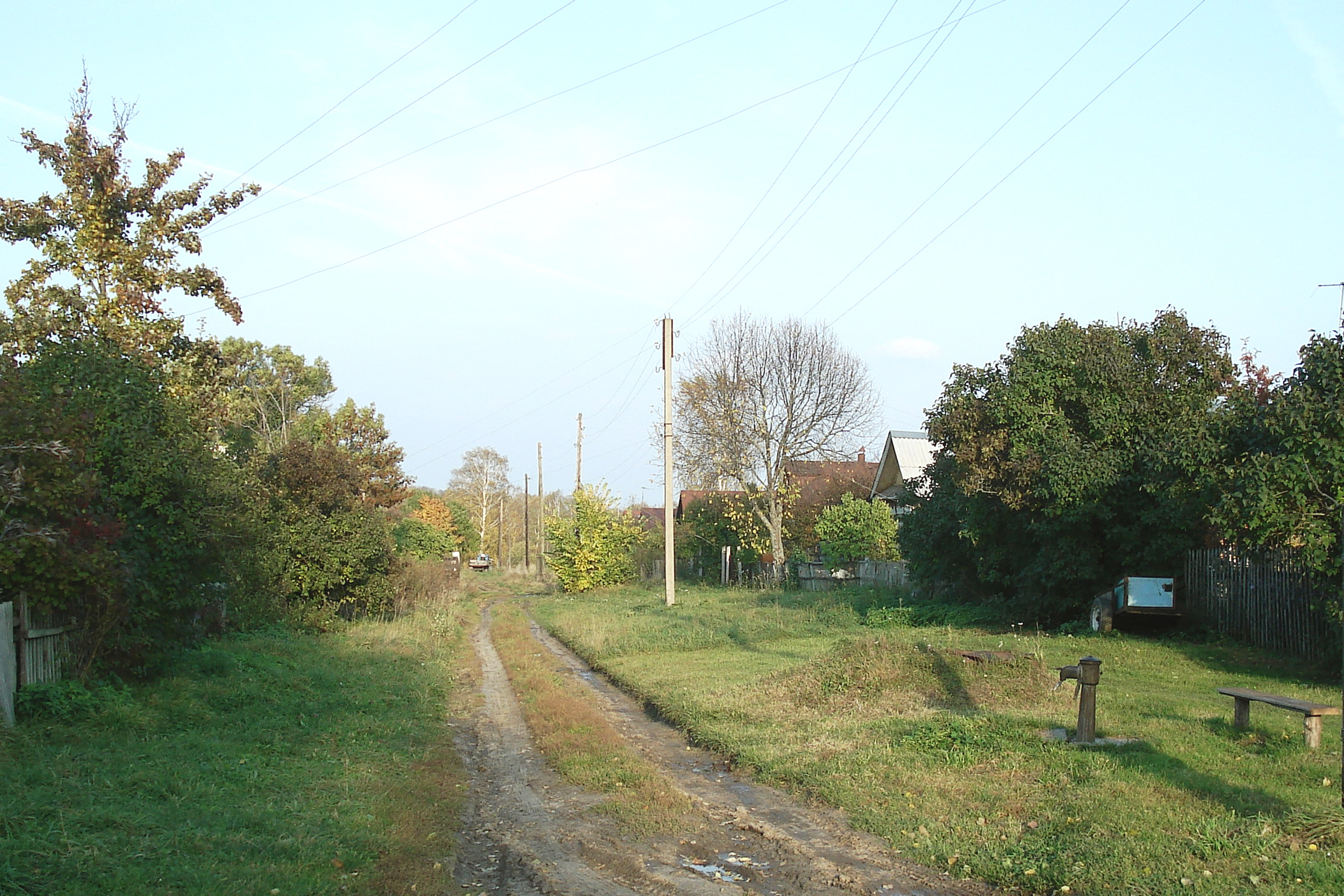

- Location within Nizhny Novgorod Oblast Location within Russia
- Coordinates: 55°56′50″N 42°44′18″E
- Country: Russia
- Region: Nizhny Novgorod Oblast
- District: Vachsky District
- Time zone: UTC+03:00

Zvyagino (Russian: Звягино) is a rural locality (a hamlet) in Chulkovsky Selsoviet, Vachsky District, Nizhny Novgorod Oblast, Russia. 21 (2010 census); 22 (2002 census);
