= Vacha, Nizhny Novgorod Oblast =

Vacha Вача
- Urban-type settlement
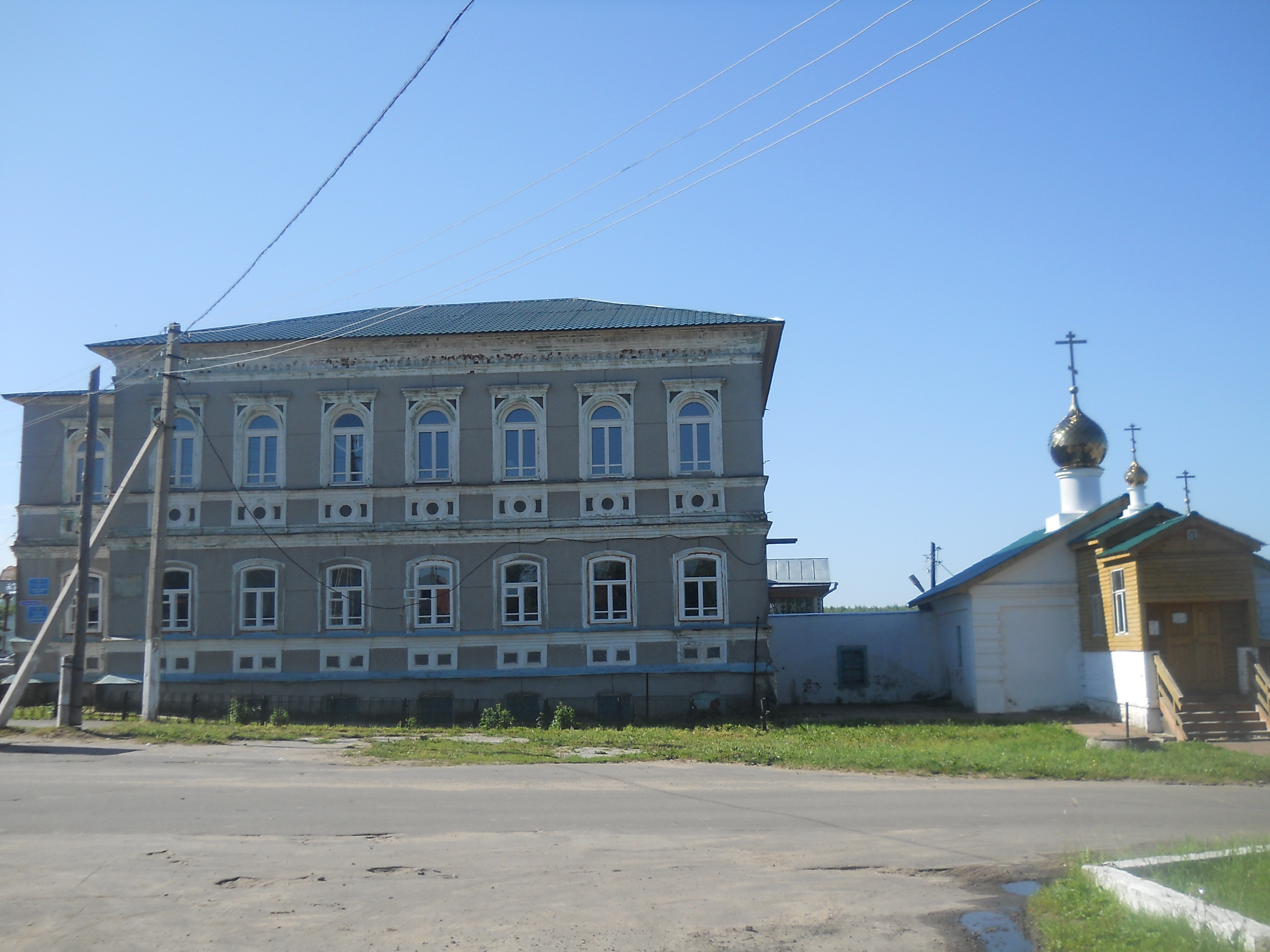
- Interactive map of Vacha
- Location of Vacha Vacha (Nizhny Novgorod Oblast)
- Coordinates: 55°48′00″N 42°46′20″E
- Country: Russia
- Federal subject: Nizhny Novgorod Oblast
- Administrative district: Vachsky District

Population (2010 Census)
  - Total: 5,987
  - Estimate (2021): 5,182 (−13.4%)
- Time zone: UTC+3 (MSK)
- Postal code: 606150
- OKTMO ID: 22617151051

Vacha (Russian: Ва́ча) is an urban locality (a work settlement) and the administrative center of Vachsky District of Nizhny Novgorod Oblast, Russia. Population: 5,987 (2010 census); 6,732 (2002 census); 7,455 (1989 Soviet census).

== History ==
It was founded in 1588. Urban-type settlement status was granted to it in 1938.
