= Bakhmutka =

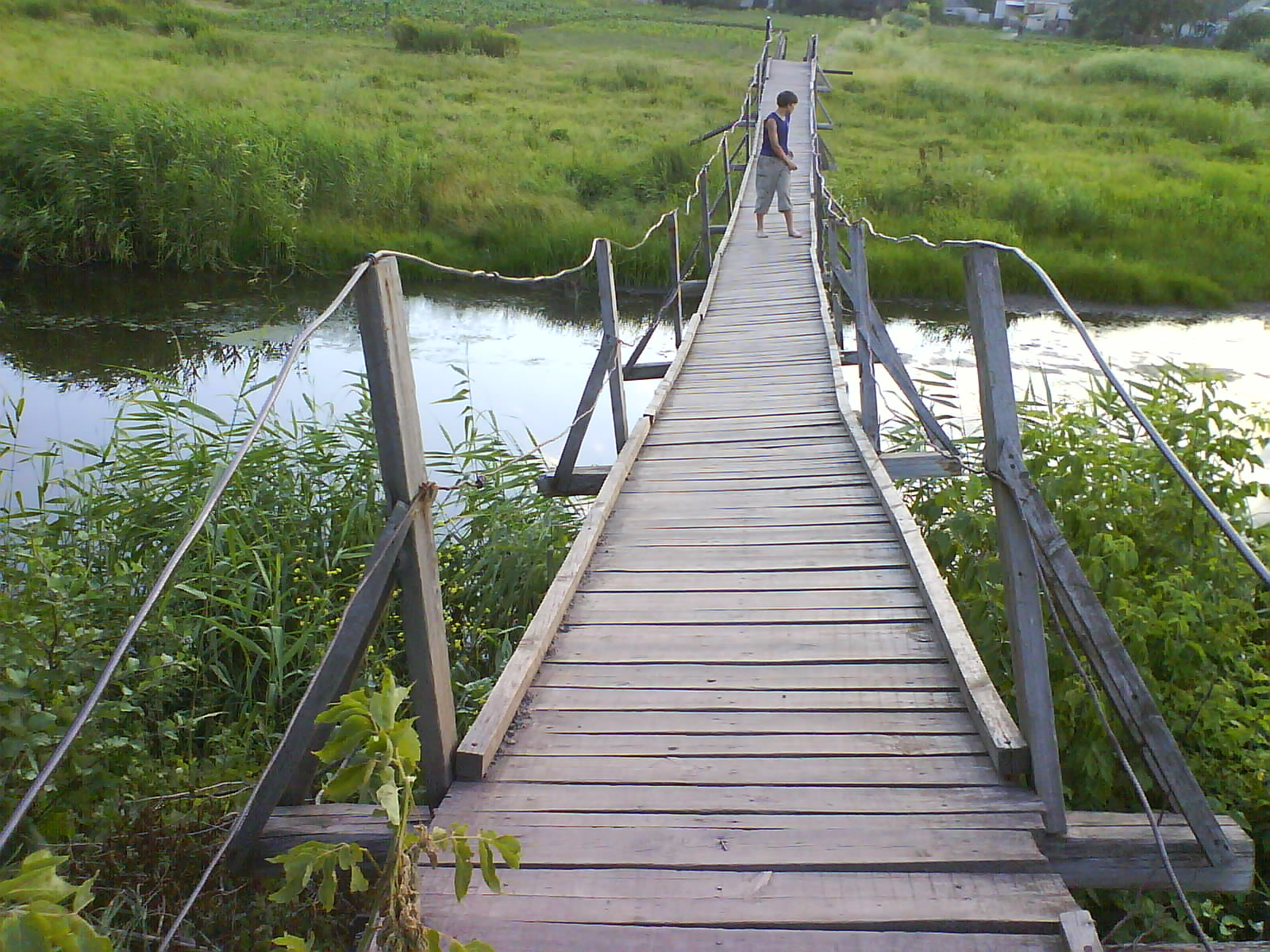
- Footbridge over the Bakhmutka at Siversk
- Native name: Бахмутка (Ukrainian)

Location
- Country: Ukraine
- Oblast: Donetsk Oblast

Physical characteristics
- Source
  - location: near Horlivka
  - coordinates: 48°21′14″N 38°03′57″E
- Mouth
  - location: Siverskyi Donets
  - coordinates: 48°55′33″N 38°02′22″E
- Length: 86 km (53 mi)
- Basin size: 1,680 km^{2} (650 sq mi)

Basin features
- River system: Don

The Bakhmutka (Ukrainian: Бахмутка) is a river in Donetsk Oblast, Ukraine. It is a right tributary of the Siverskyi Donets. It is also known as the Bakhmut (Ukrainian: Бахмут) or the Bakhmutovka.

== Geography ==
The length is 86 kilometres (53 mi) and the drainage basin area is 1,680 square kilometres (650 sq mi). It thaws in early March and freezes in December. The water is partially used for technical needs and for irrigation.

The Bakhmutka has several tributaries:

- Kamianka
- Mokra Plotva
- Serednia Stupka
- Sukha
- Sukha Plotva
- Vasiukivka
- Velyka Stupka
- Yama

The river flows through the city of Bakhmut. Siversk is also located on the Bakhmutka.

== History ==
In 1571, fortresses were built on the Bakhmutka, which served as protection of the southern border of the Tsardom of Russia with the Crimean Khanate.

In 2023, the Bakhmutka again served as a barrier between opposing forces during the battle of Bakhmut of the Russian invasion of Ukraine, after Ukrainian forces withdrew from all parts of Bakhmut east of the river in March 2023. On 7 April, Russian forces reportedly crossed the river and captured the west bank, threatening Ukrainian supply lines.

== Bibliography ==
Shvets, H.I.; Drozd, N.I.; Lebchenko, S.P. (1957). Каталог річок України [Catalog of the rivers of Ukraine] (PDF). Kyiv: Academy of Science of the Ukrainian SSR. Archived from the original (PDF) on 2016-12-21.
