= Bakhmut, Republic of Bashkortostan =

Bakhmut Бахмут
- Selo
- Location within Bashkortostan Location within Russia
- Coordinates: 52°39′N 55°54′E
- Country: Russia
- Region: Bashkortostan
- District: Kuyurgazinsky District
- Time zone: UTC+5:00

Bakhmut (Russian: Бахмут; Bashkir: Бахмут, Baxmut) is a rural locality (a selo) and the administrative centre of Bakhmutsky Selsoviet, Kuyurgazinsky District, Bashkortostan, Russia. The population was 618 as of 2010. There are 5 streets.

== Geography ==
Bakhmut is located 11 km southeast of Yermolayevo (the district's administrative centre) by road. Pokrovka is the nearest rural locality.
