= Abaimovo =

Abaimovo Абаимово
- Selo
- Location within Nizhny Novgorod Oblast Location within Russia
- Coordinates: 55°21′17″N 45°16′45″E
- Country: Russia
- Region: Nizhny Novgorod Oblast
- District: Sergachsky District
- Time zone: UTC+3:00

Abaimovo (Russian: Абаи́мово) is a rural locality (a selo) in Lopatinsky Selsoviet of Sergachsky District, Russia. The population was 145 as of 2010. There are 3 streets.

== Geography ==
Abaimovo is located 38 km southwest of Sergach (the district's administrative centre) by road. Pitsa is the nearest rural locality.

== History of title ==
The name came from the Erzya name Abaim.
