= Verkhnyaya Vereya =

Rural locality in Vyksa Urban Okrug, Nizhny Novgorod Oblast, Russia

Coordinates: 55°13′43″N 42°06′24″E

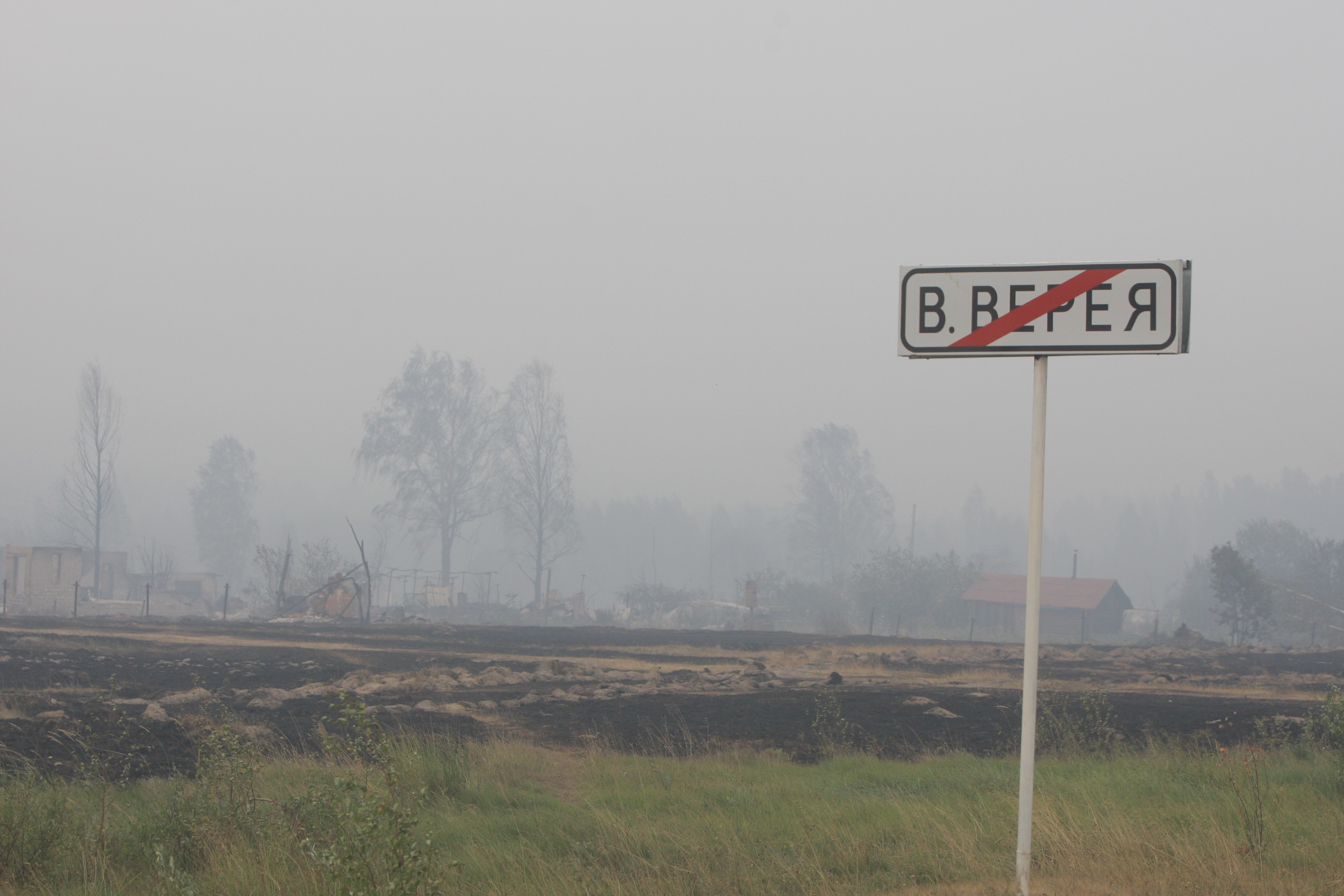
29 July 2010

Verkhnyaya Vereya (Russian: Ве́рхняя Вере́я) is a rural locality (a selo) under the administrative jurisdiction of the work settlement of Vilya in jurisdiction of the town of oblast significance of Vyksa in Nizhny Novgorod Oblast, Russia.

The village largely burned down on July 29, 2010 due to the wildfires which broke out across European Russia. All 341 houses were destroyed; 580 people were evacuated to nearby Vyksa.
