= Zvyagin =

Zvyagin (Russian: Звягин) is a Russian surname. Notable people with the surname include:

- Ivan Zvyagin (born 1991), Russian footballer
- Sergey Zvyagin (born 1971), Russian ice hockey player

== See also ==
- Zvyagintsev
