= Muromsky Uyezd =

Vladimir Governorate subdivision

Muromsky Uyezd (Муромский уезд) was one of the subdivisions of the Vladimir Governorate of the Russian Empire. It was situated in the southeastern part of the governorate. Its administrative centre was Murom.

== Demographics ==
At the time of the Russian Empire Census of 1897, Muromsky Uyezd had a population of 122,383. Of these, 99.7% spoke Russian and 0.1% Belarusian as their native language.
