= Vad, Nizhny Novgorod Oblast =

Rural locality in Nizhny Novgorod Oblast, Russia

Coordinates: 55°31′51″N 44°12′35″E

Vad (Russian: Вад) is a rural locality (a selo) and the administrative center of Vadsky District, Nizhny Novgorod Oblast, Russia. Population: 6,698 (2010 census); 6,759 (2002 census); 6,058 (1989 Soviet census).
