= Zvyagino, Voskresensky District, Nizhny Novgorod Oblast =

Zyvagino Звягино
- Derevnia
- Location within Nizhny Novgorod Oblast Location within Russia
- Coordinates: 56°44′11″N 45°32′44″E
- Country: Russia
- Region: Nizhny Novgorod Oblast
- District: Voskresensky District
- Time zone: UTC+03:00

Zvyagino (Russian: Звягино) is a rural locality (a hamlet) in Voskresensky District, Nizhny Novgorod Oblast, Russia. 110 (2010 census);
