= Vadsky District =

Vadsky District Вадский район (Russian)
- District
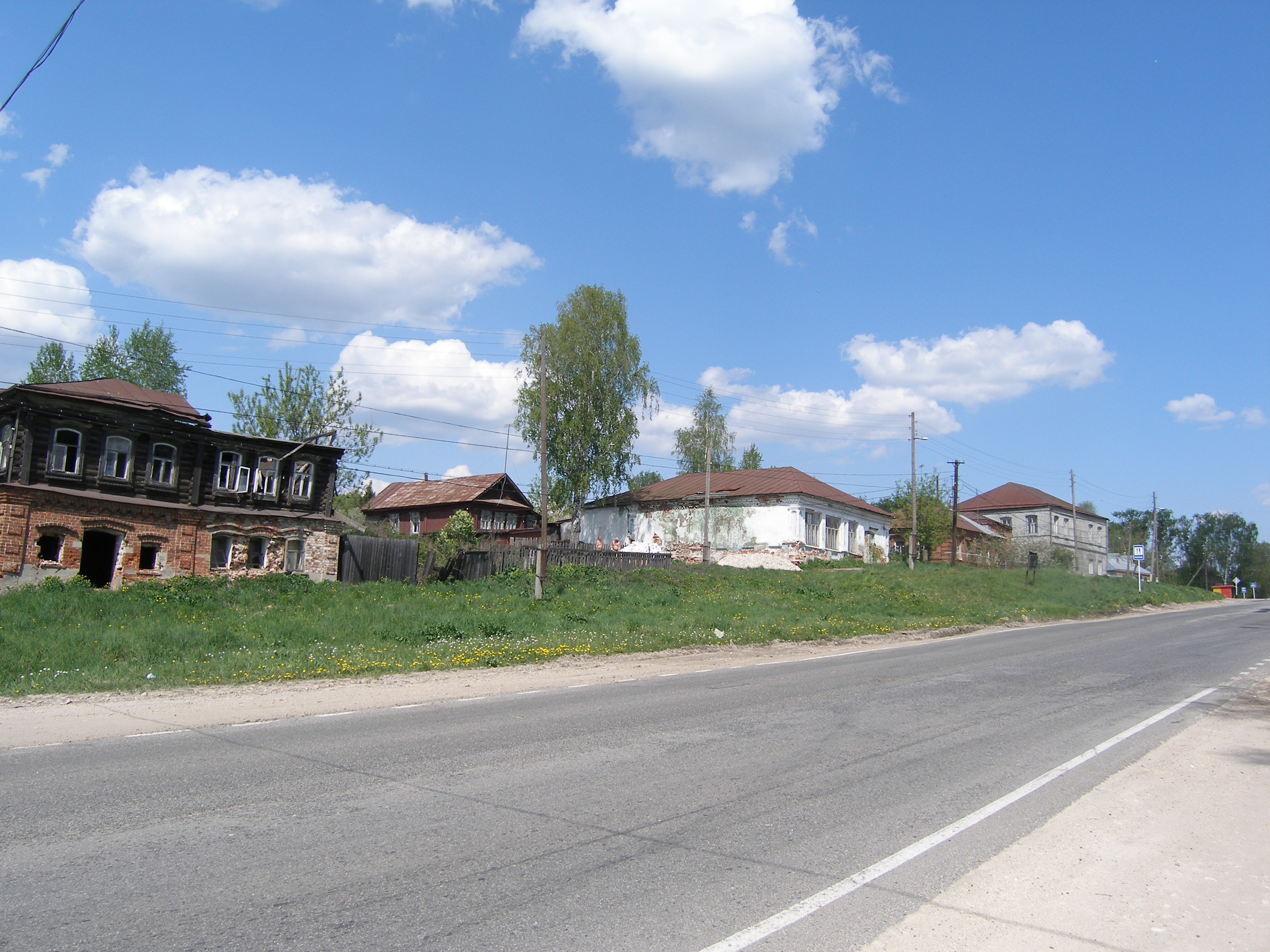
- Village Novoselki, Vadsky District

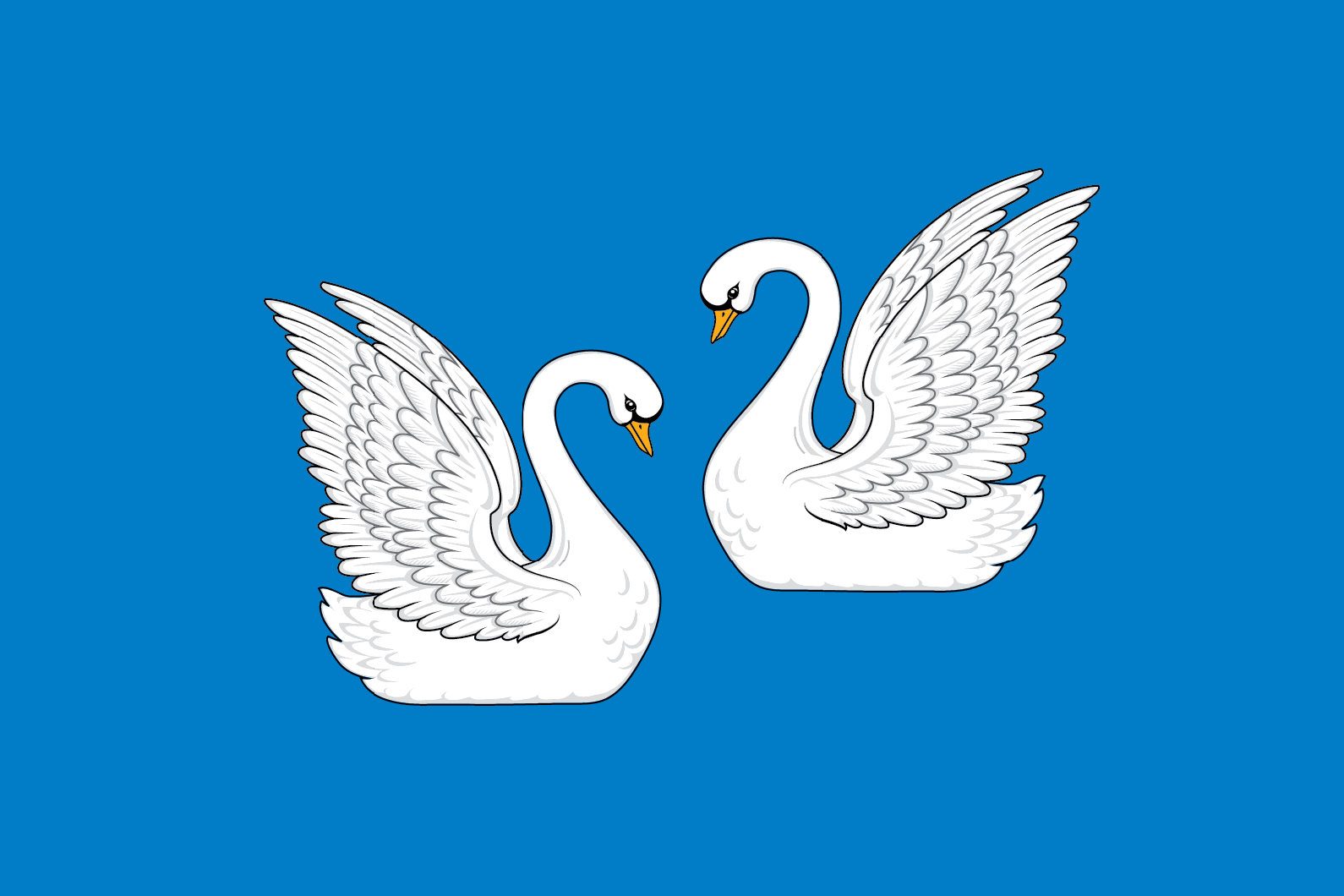
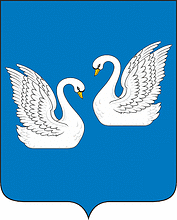
- Flag Coat of arms
- Location of Vadsky District in Nizhny Novgorod Oblast
- Coordinates: 55°31′25″N 44°12′50″E
- Country: Russia
- Federal subject: Nizhny Novgorod Oblast
- Established: 1929
- Administrative center: Vad

Area
  - Total: 742.7 km^{2} (286.8 sq mi)

Population (2010 Census)
  - Total: 15,626
  - Density: 21.04/km^{2} (54.49/sq mi)
  - Urban: 0%
  - Rural: 100%

Administrative structure
  - Administrative divisions: 6 Selsoviets
  - Inhabited localities: 46 rural localities

Municipal structure
  - Municipally incorporated as: Vadsky Municipal District
  - Municipal divisions: 0 urban settlements, 6 rural settlements
- Time zone: UTC+3 (MSK)
- OKTMO ID: 22514000
- Website: http://vadnnov.ru

Vadsky District (Russian: Ва́дский райо́н) is an administrative district (raion), one of the forty in Nizhny Novgorod Oblast, Russia. Municipally, it is part of the Vadsky Municipal District which is located in the southern central part of the oblast. The area of the district is 742.7 square kilometers (286.8 sq mi) with its administrative center located in the rural locality (a selo) of Vad. Its population is 15,626 according to the 2010 Census; and increased to 16,442 (2002 census); 15,365 (1989 Soviet census). The population of Vad accounts for 42.9% of the district's total population.

== History ==
The district was established in 1929.
