= Bakhmut, Nizhny Novgorod Oblast =

Bakhmut Бахмут
- Village
- Interactive map of Bakhmut
- Coordinates: 56°02′36″N 44°45′10″E
- Country: Russia
- Federal subject: Nizhny Novgorod Oblast
- District: Lyskovsky District
- Time zone: UTC+3 (MSK)

Bakhmut (Russian: Бахмут) is a rural locality (a village) in Lyskovsky District, Nizhny Novgorod Oblast, Russia.
