= Krasnooktyabrsky District, Nizhny Novgorod Oblast =

Krasnooktyabrsky District Краснооктябрьский район (Russian)
- District
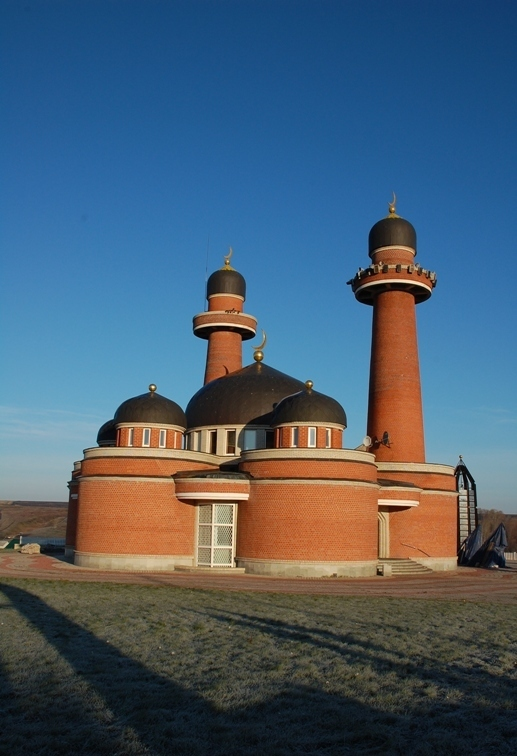
- Muslim cultural center 'Medina' in Krasnooktyabrsky District

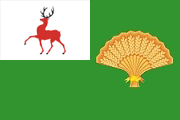
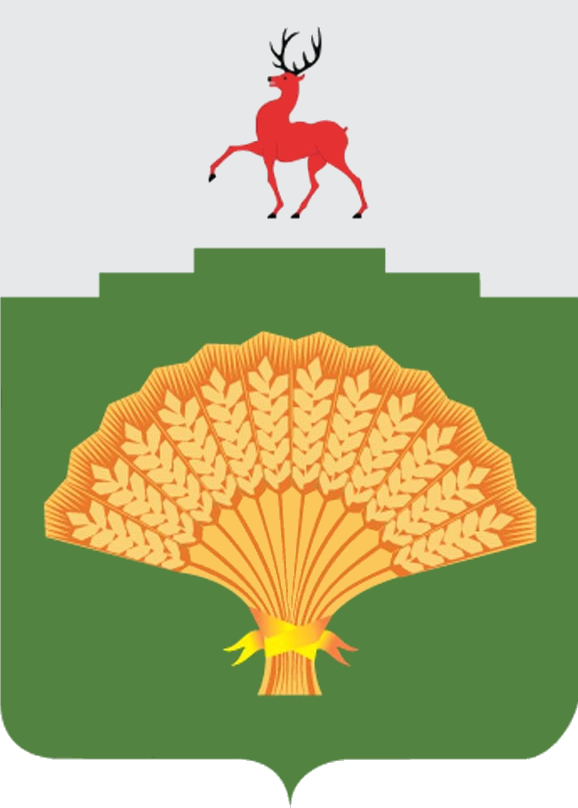
- Flag Coat of arms
- Location of Krasnooktyabrsky District in Nizhny Novgorod Oblast
- Coordinates: 55°23′56″N 45°36′32″E
- Country: Russia
- Federal subject: Nizhny Novgorod Oblast
- Established: 1929
- Administrative center: Urazovka

Area
  - Total: 886.2 km^{2} (342.2 sq mi)

Population (2010 Census)
  - Total: 11,729
  - Density: 13.24/km^{2} (34.28/sq mi)
  - Urban: 0%
  - Rural: 100%

Administrative structure
  - Administrative divisions: 12 Selsoviets
  - Inhabited localities: 45 rural localities

Municipal structure
  - Municipally incorporated as: Krasnooktyabrsky Municipal District
  - Municipal divisions: 0 urban settlements, 12 rural settlements
- Time zone: UTC+3 (MSK)
- OKTMO ID: 22636000
- Website: http://kro.omsu-nnov.ru

Krasnooktyabrsky District (Russian: Краснооктя́брьский райо́н; Tatar: Кызыл Октябрь районы, romanized: Qızıl Oktəber rayonı) is an administrative district (raion), one of the forty in Nizhny Novgorod Oblast, Russia. Municipally, it is incorporated as Krasnooktyabrsky Municipal District. It is located in the southeast of the oblast.

The area of the district is 886.2 square kilometers (342.2 sq mi). Its administrative center is the rural locality (a selo) of Urazovka. Population: 11,729 (2010 Census); 13,496 (2002 census); 16,662 (1989 Soviet census).

The population of Urazovka accounts for 13.9% of the district's total population.

== History ==
The district was established in 1929 and given its present name in 1930.
