= Urazovka, Nizhny Novgorod Oblast =

Rural locality in Nizhny Novgorod Oblast, Russia

Coordinates: 55°24′08″N 45°37′11″E

Urazovka (Russian: Ура́зовка; Tatar: Уразавыл, Urazavıl) is a rural locality (a selo) and the administrative center of Krasnooktyabrsky District, Nizhny Novgorod Oblast, Russia. Population: 1,626 (2010 census); 1,916 (2002 census); 2,303 (1989 Soviet census).
