= Vachsky District =

Vachsky District Вачский район (Russian)
- District
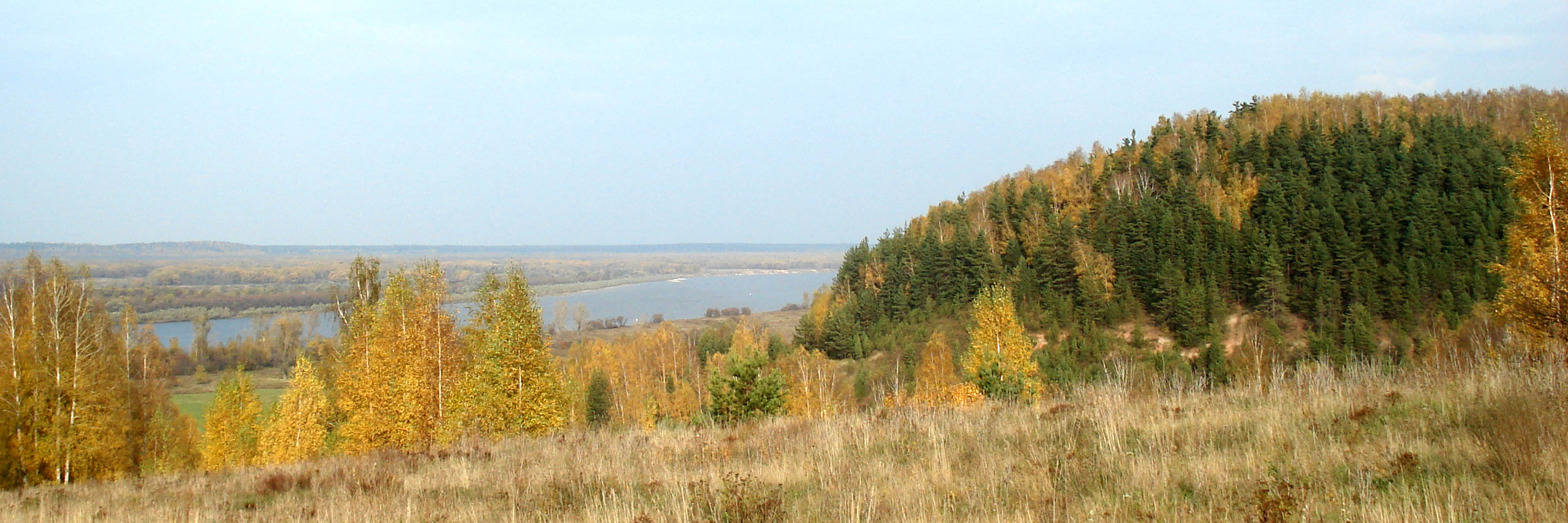
- View of the Oka River near the village of Pozhoga, Vachsky District

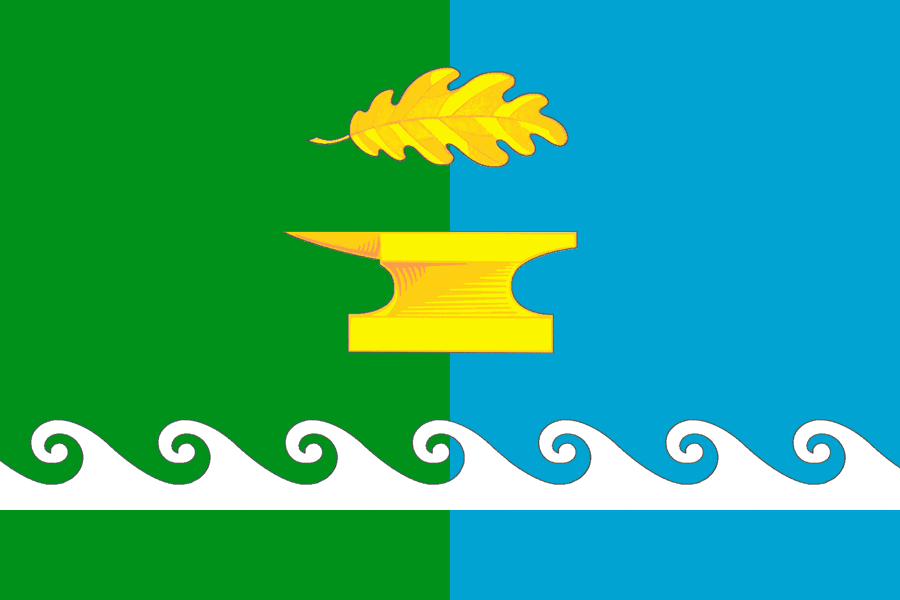
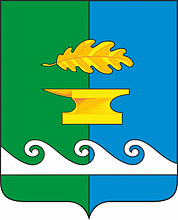
- Flag Coat of arms
- Location of Vachsky District in Nizhny Novgorod Oblast
- Coordinates: 55°48′00″N 42°46′20″E
- Country: Russia
- Federal subject: Nizhny Novgorod Oblast
- Established: 1929
- Administrative center: Vacha

Area
  - Total: 979.5 km^{2} (378.2 sq mi)

Population (2010 Census)
  - Total: 19,979
  - Density: 20.40/km^{2} (52.83/sq mi)
  - Urban: 30.0%
  - Rural: 70.0%

Administrative structure
  - Administrative divisions: 1 Work settlements, 5 Selsoviets
  - Inhabited localities: 1 urban-type settlements, 117 rural localities

Municipal structure
  - Municipally incorporated as: Vachsky Municipal District
  - Municipal divisions: 1 urban settlements, 5 rural settlements
- Time zone: UTC+3 (MSK)
- OKTMO ID: 22617000
- Website: http://вача-ннов.рф

Vachsky District (Russian: Ва́чский райо́н) is an administrative district (raion), one of the forty in Nizhny Novgorod Oblast, Russia. Municipally, it is incorporated as Vachsky Municipal District. It is located in the southwest of the oblast. The area of the district is 979.5 square kilometers (378.2 sq mi). Its administrative center is the urban locality (a work settlement) of Vacha. Population: 19,979 (2010 Census); 23,349 (2002 census); 29,198 (1989 Soviet census). The population of Vacha accounts for 30.0% of the district's total population.

== History ==
The district was established in 1929.
