= 2023 Nizhny Novgorod Oblast gubernatorial election =

- 8–10 September 2023
- Turnout: 55.92%
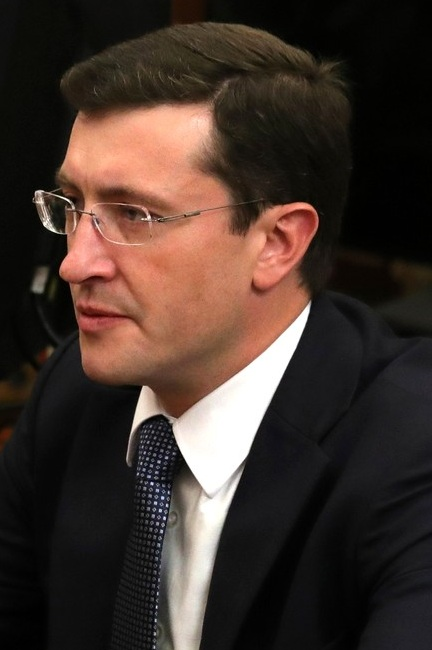
		CPRF
Candidate	Gleb Nikitin	Vladislav Yegorov
Party	United Russia	CPRF
Popular vote	1,159,013	135,329
Percentage	82.82%	9.67%
- Results by raions and cities.
Governor before election
Gleb Nikitin
United Russia
Governor-elect
Gleb Nikitin
United Russia

The 2023 Nizhny Novgorod Oblast gubernatorial election took place on 8–10 September 2023, on common election day. Incumbent Governor Gleb Nikitin was re-elected to a second term in office.

== Background ==
First Deputy Minister of Industry and Trade Gleb Nikitin was appointed acting Governor of Nizhny Novgorod Oblast in September 2017, replacing third-term Governor Valery Shantsev. Nikitin won the subsequent 2018 gubernatorial election with 67.75% of the vote over four opponents. Throughout Nikitin's first term rumours have spread about his potential promotion to the post of Minister of Industry and Trade of Russia, however, Governor Nikitin continuously denied allegations.

== Candidates ==
In Nizhny Novgorod Oblast candidates for Governor can be nominated only by registered political parties; self-nomination is not possible. However, candidates are not obliged to be members of the nominating party. Candidate for Governor of Nizhny Novgorod Oblast should be a Russian citizen and at least 30 years old. Candidates for Governor should not have a foreign citizenship or residence permit. Each candidate in order to be registered is required to collect at least 7% of signatures of members and heads of municipalities. Also gubernatorial candidates present 3 candidacies to the Federation Council and election winner later appoints one of the presented candidates.

=== Registered ===
- Vladislav Atmakhov (LDPR), Member of Legislative Assembly of Nizhny Novgorod Oblast (2016–present), deputy general director of Ya. M. Sverdlova State Owned Enterprise
- Vladimir Bykov (RPPSS), military pensioner, 2014 and 2018 gubernatorial candidate
- Gleb Nikitin (United Russia), incumbent Governor of Nizhny Novgorod Oblast (2017–present)
- Ilya Pomerantsev (Civilian Power), IT project manager
- Vladislav Yegorov (CPRF), Deputy Chairman of the Legislative Assembly of Nizhny Novgorod Oblast (2011–present), Member of Legislative Assembly (2006–present), 2018 gubernatorial candidate

=== Declined ===
- Tatyana Bogdanova (RPPSS), chairwoman of RPPSS regional office
- Mikhail Delyagin (SR–ZP), Member of State Duma (2021–present)
- Rustam Dosayev (New People), Member of Legislative Assembly of Nizhny Novgorod Oblast (2021–present), 2014 Civic Platform gubernatorial candidate
- Tatyana Grinevich (SR–ZP), Member of Legislative Assembly of Nizhny Novgorod Oblast (2021–present) (endorsed Nikitin)
- Galina Klochkova (SR–ZP), former Member of Legislative Assembly of Nizhny Novgorod Oblast (2011–2021), 2018 gubernatorial candidate
- Dmitry Kuznetsov (SR–ZP), Member of State Duma (2021–present)
- Vladimir Plyakin (New People), Member of State Duma (2021–present)

=== Candidates for Federation Council ===
- Gleb Nikitin (United Russia):
  - Vladimir Lebedev, incumbent Senator form Nizhny Novgorod Oblast (2014–present)
  - Yevgeny Lyulin, Chairman of the Legislative Assembly of Nizhny Novgorod Oblast (2002–2007, 2020–present), Member of Legislative Assembly (2002–2013, 2020–present)
  - Olga Shchetinina, First Deputy Chairwoman of the Legislative Assembly of Nizhny Novgorod Oblast (2021–present), Member of Legislative Assembly (2011–present)
- Vladislav Yegorov (CPRF):
  - Roman Kabeshev, Member of Legislative Assembly of Nizhny Novgorod Oblast (2011–present)
  - Nikolay Satayev, Deputy Chairman of the Duma of Nizhny Novgorod (2018–present), Member of Duma (2015–present)
  - Aleksandr Terentyev, Member of Duma of Dzerzhinsk (2015–present), former Member of Legislative Assembly of Nizhny Novgorod Oblast (2011–2015)

== Polls ==
Fieldwork date	Polling firm	Nikitin	Yegorov	Atmakhov	Bykov	Pomerantsev	None	Lead
25 July – 10 August 2023	FOM	81%	7%	5%	4%	2%	1%	74%

== Results ==
Summary of the 8–10 September 2023 Nizhny Novgorod Oblast gubernatorial election results
Candidate	Party	Votes	%
Gleb Nikitin (incumbent)	United Russia	1,159,013	82.82
Vladislav Yegorov	Communist Party	135,329	9.67
Vladislav Atmakhov	Liberal Democratic Party	43,073	3.08
Aleksandr Bykov	Party of Pensioners	27,611	1.97
Ilya Pomerantsev	Civilian Power	24,275	1.73
Valid votes		1,389,301	99.28
Blank ballots		10,073	0.72
Total		1,399,374	100.00
Turnout		1,399,374	55.92
Registered voters		2,502,536	100.00

Governor Nikitin re-appointed incumbent Senator Vladimir Lebedev (United Russia) to the Federation Council.

== See also ==
- 2023 Russian regional elections
