= 2026 Nizhny Novgorod Oblast legislative election =

Regional legislative election in Russia

- 18–20 September 2026

All 50 seats in the Legislative Assembly 26 seats needed for a majority
- Turnout: 60.66% ▲13.04 pp
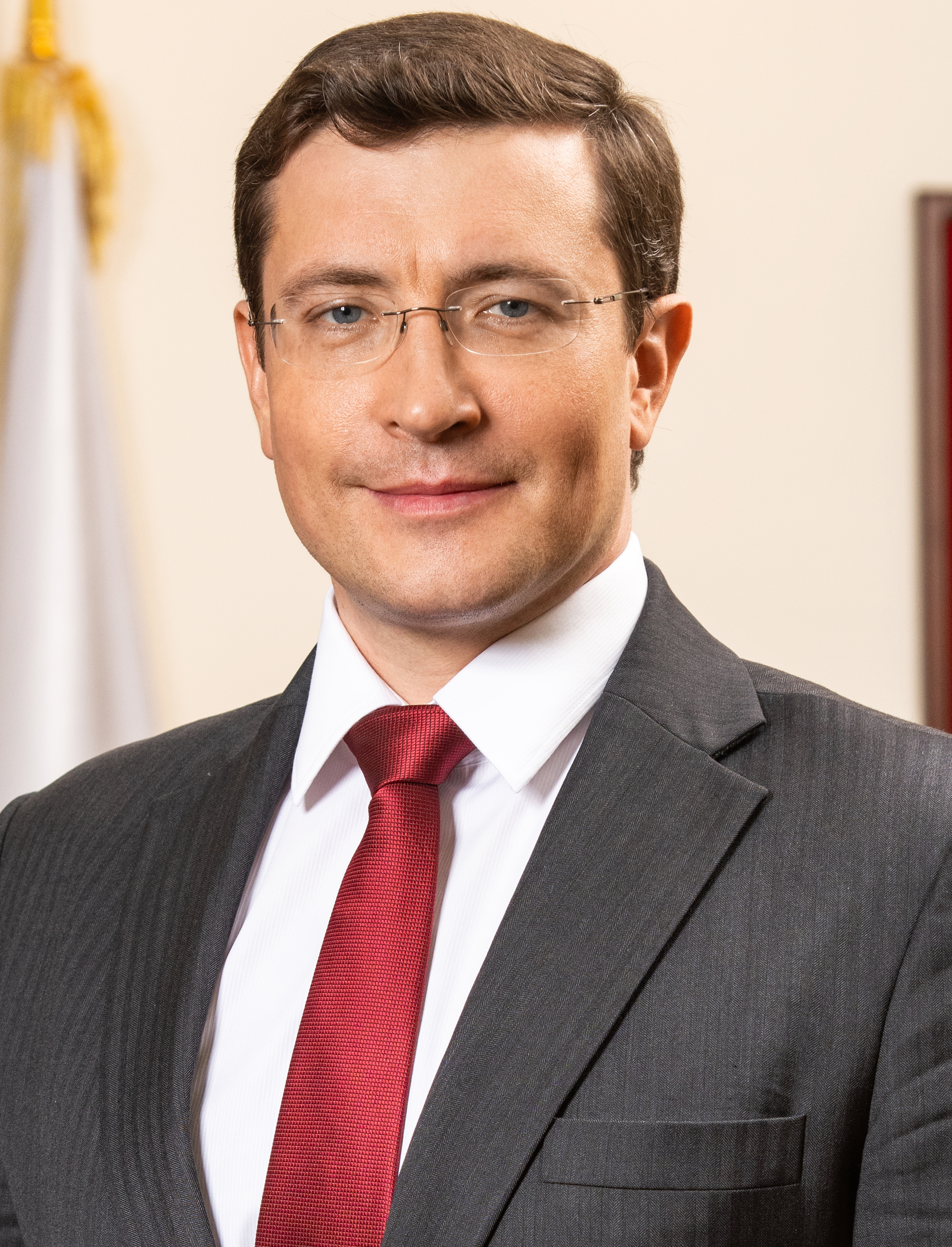

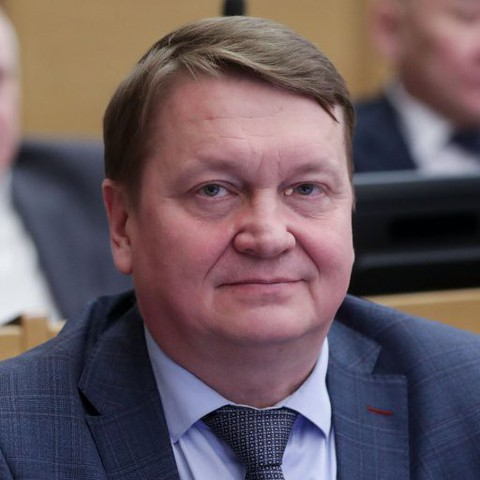

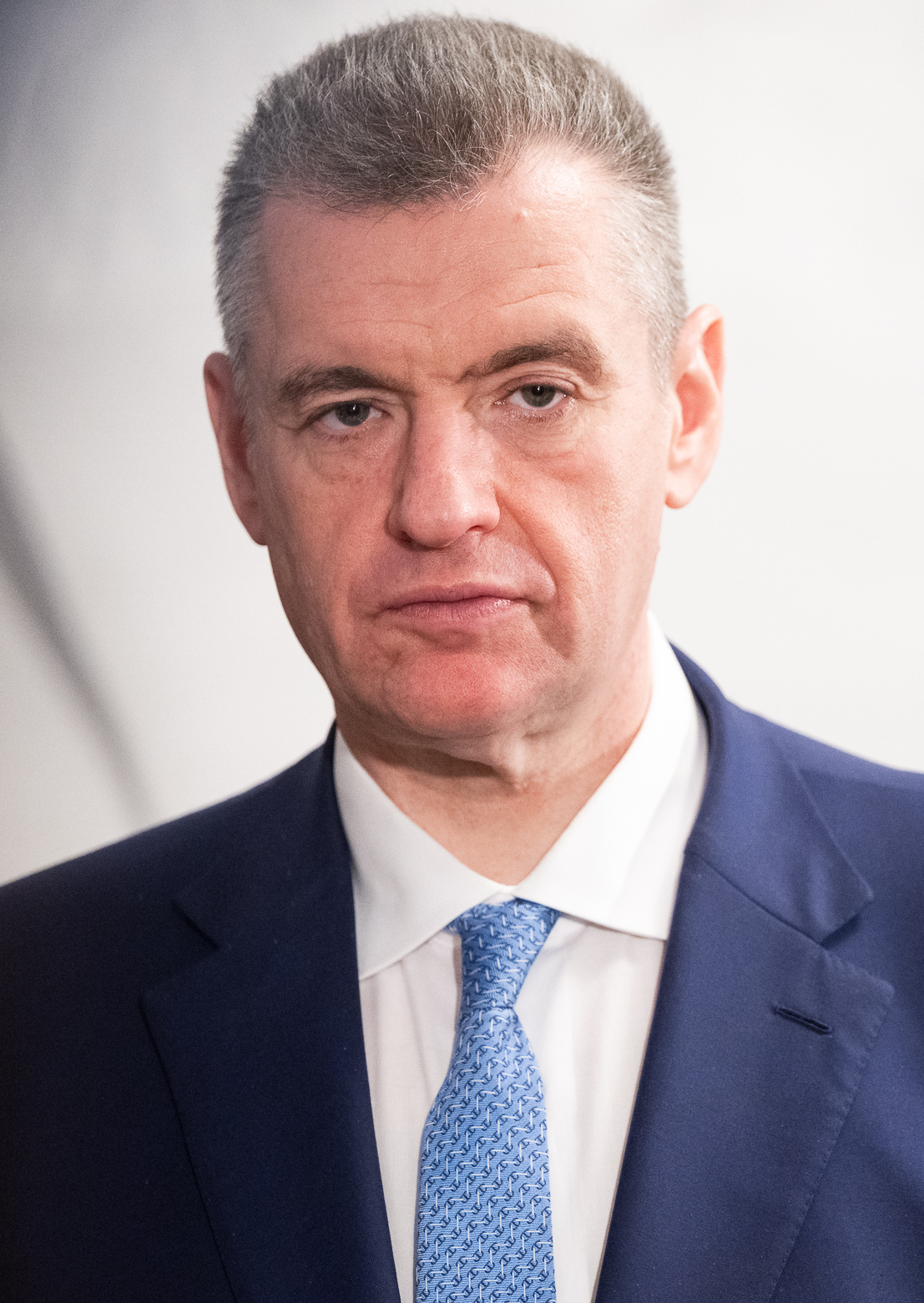

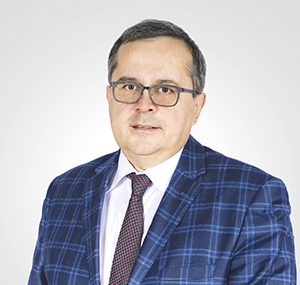
	Majority party	Minority party	Third party
Candidate	Gleb Nikitin	Vladislav Yegorov	Leonid Slutsky
Party	United Russia	CPRF	LDPR
Last election	49.01%, 40 seats	19.18%, 5 seats	7.03%, 2 seats
Seats won	41	4	2
Seat change	▲1	▼1	Steady
Popular vote	791,483	236,087	172,158
Percentage	52.97%	15.80%	11.52%
Swing	▲3.96 pp	▼3.38 pp	▲4.49 pp
	Fourth party	Fifth party	Sixth party
	NL	SR
Candidate	Pavel Solodkiy	Tatyana Grinevich	Erik Prazdnikov
Party	New People	A Just Russia	Party of Pensioners
Last election	5.53%, 1 seat (Note: Rustam Dosayev, the sole party faction member, left the party in April 2026 to run in the United Russia primary)	9.55%, 2 seats	4.52%, 0 seats
Seats won	2	1	0
Seat change	▲1	▼1	Steady
Popular vote	133,104	106,598	37,963
Percentage	8.91%	7.13%	2.54%
Swing	▲3.38 pp	▼2.42 pp	▼1.98 pp
Chairman before election
Yevgeny Lyulin
United Russia
Elected Chairman
Yevgeny Lyulin
United Russia
Senator before election
Dmitry Krasnov
United Russia
Senator after election
Olga Shchetinina
United Russia

The 2026 Legislative Assembly of Nizhny Novgorod Oblast election took place on 18–20 September 2026, on common election day, coinciding with the 2026 Russian legislative election. All 50 seats in the Legislative Assembly were up for re-election.

United Russia slightly increased its overwhelming majority in the Legislative Assembly, winning 53% of the vote and all 25 single-mandate constituencies. Communist Party of the Russian Federation and A Just Russia saw their vote shares reduced and lost one seat each. Liberal Democratic Party of Russia and New People increased their vote shares, but only New People gained additional seat.

== Electoral system ==
Under current election laws, the Legislative Assembly is elected for a term of five years, with parallel voting. 25 seats are elected by party-list proportional representation with a 5% electoral threshold, with the other half elected in 25 single-member constituencies by first-past-the-post voting. Seats in the proportional part are allocated using the Imperiali quota, modified to ensure that every party list, which passes the threshold, receives at least one mandate.

== Candidates ==
=== Party lists ===
To register regional lists of candidates, parties need to collect 0.5% of signatures of all registered voters in Nizhny Novgorod Oblast.

The following parties were relieved from the necessity to collect signatures:

- United Russia
- Communist Party of the Russian Federation
- Liberal Democratic Party of Russia
- A Just Russia
- New People
- Russian Party of Pensioners for Social Justice

№	Party	Oblast-wide list	Candidates	Territorial groups	Status
1	Communist Party	Vladislav Yegorov • Roman Kabeshev • Lyudmila Burkova • Aleksandr Chernigin • Oleg Kiritsa	55	25	Registered
2	A Just Russia	Tatyana Grinevich • Roman Laptev • Sergey Chendyrin	58	25	Registered
3	United Russia	Gleb Nikitin • Yevgeny Lyulin • Olga Shchetinina • Yulia Garevskaya • Aleksandr Shchelokov	80	25	Registered
4	Party of Pensioners	Erik Prazdnikov • Aleksandr Tsopov • Aleksandr Kuligin • Valery Leushkin • Andrey Koposov	55	25	Registered
5	New People	Pavel Solodkiy • Oleg Gusarovsky • Arsen Krbashyan • Anastasia Cherneva • Aleksey Dushkin	46	25	Registered
6	Liberal Democratic Party	Leonid Slutsky • Vladislav Atmakhov • Dmitry Yelizarov • Aleksey Zdyumayev • Mikhail Shatilov	55	25	Registered
	Rodina	Aleksey Kamrakov	14	13	Failed to qualify

Communists of Russia, which participated in the last election, did not filed, while Party of Growth was dissolved and merged with New People.

=== Single-mandate constituencies ===
25 single-mandate constituencies were formed in Nizhny Novgorod Oblast. To register candidates in single-mandate constituencies need to collect 3% of signatures of registered voters in the constituency.

Number of candidates in single-mandate constituencies
Party	Candidates	
Party	Nominated	Registered
United Russia	25	25
Communist Party	25	25
A Just Russia	25	24
Liberal Democratic Party	25	25
New People	25	24
Party of Pensioners	25	25
Independent	3	0
Total	153	148

== Results ==
=== Results by party lists ===
Summary of the 18–20 September 2026 Legislative Assembly of Nizhny Novgorod Oblast election results
Party	Party list					Constituency		Total	
Party	Votes	%	±pp	Seats	+/–	Seats	+/–	Seats	+/–
United Russia	791,483	52.97	▲3.96	16	▲1	25	Steady	41	▲1
Communist Party	236,087	15.80	▼3.38	4	▼1	0	Steady	4	▼1
Liberal Democratic Party	172,158	11.52	▲4.49	2	Steady	0	Steady	2	Steady
New People	133,104	8.91	▲3.38	2	▲1	0	Steady	2	▲1
A Just Russia	106,598	7.13	▼2.42	1	▼1	0	Steady	1	▼1
Party of Pensioners	37,963	2.54	▼1.98	0	Steady	0	Steady	0	Steady
Invalid ballots	16,910	1.13	▼1.10	—	—	—	—	—	—
Total	1,494,303	100.00	—	25	Steady	25	Steady	50	Steady
Turnout	1,494,303	60.66	▲13.04	—	—	—	—	—	—
Registered voters	2,463,414	100.00	—	—	—	—	—	—	—

Yevgeny Lyulin (United Russia) was re-elected as Chairman of the Legislative Assembly. Senator Olga Shchetinina (United Russia), representing executive branch of Nizhny Novgorod Oblast, was appointed to the Federation Council, replacing incumbent Senator Dmitry Krasnov (United Russia). Krasnov was elected Deputy Chairman of the Legislative Assembly.

=== Results in single-member constituencies ===
==== District 1 ====
Summary of the 18–20 September 2026 Legislative Assembly of Nizhny Novgorod Oblast election in District 1
Candidate	Party	Votes	%
Kirill Epstein	United Russia	29,085	47.43%
Yevgeny Manayev	Communist Party	10,252	16.72%
Yelena Golubeva	New People	7,647	12.47%
Maksim Karpov	Liberal Democratic Party	6,160	10.04%
Igor Zubarev	A Just Russia	4,810	7.84%
Aleksey Podpolny	Party of Pensioners	2,352	3.84%
Total		61,325	100%

==== District 2 ====
Summary of the 18–20 September 2026 Legislative Assembly of Nizhny Novgorod Oblast election in District 2
Candidate	Party	Votes	%
Vadim Pichugin (incumbent)	United Russia	25,234	46.73%
Artyom Larkin	Communist Party	9,212	17.06%
Denis Dorogin	New People	6,443	11.93%
Alyona Doronova	Liberal Democratic Party	5,545	10.27%
Roman Vinogradov	A Just Russia	4,836	8.96%
Nina Maul	Party of Pensioners	1,818	3.37%
Total		53,999	100%

==== District 3 ====
Summary of the 18–20 September 2026 Legislative Assembly of Nizhny Novgorod Oblast election in District 3
Candidate	Party	Votes	%
Vladimir Moskalenko	United Russia	16,222	35.43%
Yevgeny Stepanov	Communist Party	9,072	19.82%
Ivan Dorofeyev	New People	6,496	14.19%
Venera Prokshina	Liberal Democratic Party	4,804	10.49%
Lyubov Komarova	Party of Pensioners	4,092	8.94%
Nina Selikhova	A Just Russia	3,536	7.72%
Total		45,783	100%

==== District 4 ====
Summary of the 18–20 September 2026 Legislative Assembly of Nizhny Novgorod Oblast election in District 4
Candidate	Party	Votes	%
Vasily Sukhanov (incumbent)	United Russia	25,780	47.90%
Dmitry Semin	Communist Party	8,926	16.58%
Igor Telenkov	Liberal Democratic Party	6,606	12.27%
Svetlana Osipova	New People	6,245	11.60%
Andrey Panyagin	A Just Russia	4,011	7.45%
Olga Poluektova	Party of Pensioners	1,786	3.32%
Total		53,820	100%

==== District 5 ====
Summary of the 18–20 September 2026 Legislative Assembly of Nizhny Novgorod Oblast election in District 5
Candidate	Party	Votes	%
Mikhail Morozov	United Russia	28,888	49.53%
Yevgeny Valeyev	Communist Party	10,089	17.30%
Eduard Romanov	New People	5,970	10.24%
Anzhelika Tregub	Liberal Democratic Party	4,567	7.83%
Yevgeny Lepekhin	A Just Russia	4,102	7.03%
Tatyana Lutokhina	Party of Pensioners	3,342	5.73%
Total		58,321	100%

==== District 6 ====
Summary of the 18–20 September 2026 Legislative Assembly of Nizhny Novgorod Oblast election in District 6
Candidate	Party	Votes	%
Ilya Khramov	United Russia	24,567	43.02%
Alla Kozlova	Communist Party	10,459	18.32%
Yelena Zapevalova	New People	7,793	13.65%
Marina Shumilova	Liberal Democratic Party	6,190	10.84%
Pavel Kuvarzin	A Just Russia	5,249	9.19%
Irina Yufereva	Party of Pensioners	1,834	3.21%
Total		57,106	100%

==== District 7 ====
Summary of the 18–20 September 2026 Legislative Assembly of Nizhny Novgorod Oblast election in District 7
Candidate	Party	Votes	%
Maksim Rebrov	United Russia	21,951	45.44%
Mikhail Garanin	New People	7,739	16.02%
Yaroslav Komissarov	Communist Party	7,020	14.53%
Gennady Shipilov	A Just Russia	5,072	10.50%
Dmitry Nikolayev	Liberal Democratic Party	2,849	5.90%
Svetlana Zotova	Party of Pensioners	2,530	5.24%
Total		48,309	100%

==== District 8 ====
Summary of the 18–20 September 2026 Legislative Assembly of Nizhny Novgorod Oblast election in District 8
Candidate	Party	Votes	%
Yury Balashov (incumbent)	United Russia	26,562	41.97%
Ksenia Pozharova	Communist Party	9,084	14.35%
Aleksey Kozhukhov	A Just Russia	8,534	13.48%
Yulia Vakhonina	New People	8,298	13.11%
Ivan Korniyenko	Liberal Democratic Party	6,198	9.79%
Albina Pivikova	Party of Pensioners	3,555	5.62%
Total		63,286	100%

==== District 9 ====
Summary of the 18–20 September 2026 Legislative Assembly of Nizhny Novgorod Oblast election in District 9
Candidate	Party	Votes	%
Natalya Smotrakova (incumbent)	United Russia	21,007	44.43%
Anatoly Tarnayev	Communist Party	7,317	15.47%
Irina Molkova	Liberal Democratic Party	6,404	13.54%
Anna Tatarintseva	A Just Russia	5,259	11.12%
Marina Overina	New People	4,358	9.22%
Tatyana Bakayeva	Party of Pensioners	2,360	4.99%
Total		47,285	100%

==== District 10 ====
Summary of the 18–20 September 2026 Legislative Assembly of Nizhny Novgorod Oblast election in District 10
Candidate	Party	Votes	%
Anton Greben (incumbent)	United Russia	32,388	53.88%
Irina Malysheva	Communist Party	9,670	16.09%
Andrey Bokov	A Just Russia	5,361	8.92%
Andrey Devonin	New People	5,022	8.35%
Vladimir Gulyayev	Liberal Democratic Party	4,557	7.58%
Andrey Koposov	Party of Pensioners	2,261	3.76%
Total		60,108	100%

==== District 11 ====
Summary of the 18–20 September 2026 Legislative Assembly of Nizhny Novgorod Oblast election in District 11
Candidate	Party	Votes	%
Andrey Kuvaev	United Russia	20,628	50.60%
Irina Voronina	Communist Party	7,895	19.36%
Anatoly Zverev	Liberal Democratic Party	3,741	9.18%
Artyom Mansurov	New People	3,638	8.92%
Mikhail Nosov	A Just Russia	2,520	6.18%
Konstantin Telegin	Party of Pensioners	1,733	4.25%
Total		40,770	100%

==== District 12 ====
Summary of the 18–20 September 2026 Legislative Assembly of Nizhny Novgorod Oblast election in District 12
Candidate	Party	Votes	%
Yevgeny Lyulin (incumbent)	United Russia	23,968	55.66%
Andrey Goryunov	Communist Party	6,665	15.48%
Roman Belikov	Liberal Democratic Party	3,765	8.74%
Andrey Belov	New People	3,709	8.61%
Nina Aranovich	A Just Russia	3,078	7.15%
Anastasia Naydenkova	Party of Pensioners	1,340	3.11%
Total		43,060	100%

==== District 13 ====
Summary of the 18–20 September 2026 Legislative Assembly of Nizhny Novgorod Oblast election in District 13
Candidate	Party	Votes	%
Igor Norenkov	United Russia	34,376	56.80%
Lyubov Ponomareva	Communist Party	8,869	14.66%
Natalia Naumova	Liberal Democratic Party	7,498	12.39%
Yelena Krylova	A Just Russia	4,405	7.28%
Arsen Krbashyan	New People	3,324	5.49%
Nadezhda Sredneva	Party of Pensioners	1,682	2.78%
Total		60,516	100%

==== District 14 ====
Summary of the 18–20 September 2026 Legislative Assembly of Nizhny Novgorod Oblast election in District 14
Candidate	Party	Votes	%
Igor Tyurin (incumbent)	United Russia	49,605	67.53%
Grigory Antyashov	Communist Party	9,129	12.43%
Yulia Lyubavina	Liberal Democratic Party	5,331	7.26%
Ilya Zarubin	New People	4,478	6.10%
Natalia Loginova	A Just Russia	3,342	4.55%
Nadezhda Bushuyeva	Party of Pensioners	1,221	1.66%
Total		73,461	100%

==== District 15 ====
Summary of the 18–20 September 2026 Legislative Assembly of Nizhny Novgorod Oblast election in District 15
Candidate	Party	Votes	%
Aleksandr Barykov (incumbent)	United Russia	46,631	58.50%
Roman Mitrofanov	Communist Party	11,836	14.85%
Munosibzhon Khamrakulov	New People	7,249	9.09%
Marina Lyutina	A Just Russia	4,373	5.49%
Daniil Muravyov	Liberal Democratic Party	3,778	4.74%
Natalya Guseva	Party of Pensioners	3,516	4.41%
Total		79,715	100%

==== District 16 ====
Summary of the 18–20 September 2026 Legislative Assembly of Nizhny Novgorod Oblast election in District 16
Candidate	Party	Votes	%
Yury Yakimov (incumbent)	United Russia	29,938	59.08%
Sergey Tuchin	Communist Party	5,199	10.26%
Tatyana Gorchakova	Liberal Democratic Party	4,828	9.53%
Vladislav Adamov	New People	4,724	9.32%
Igor Churakov	A Just Russia	2,413	4.76%
Aleksey Kurakin	Party of Pensioners	2,212	4.37%
Total		50,674	100%

==== District 17 ====
Summary of the 18–20 September 2026 Legislative Assembly of Nizhny Novgorod Oblast election in District 17
Candidate	Party	Votes	%
Dmitry Krasnov	United Russia	47,322	63.44%
Sergey Vdovin	Communist Party	8,486	11.38%
Andrey Gusev	A Just Russia	5,774	7.74%
Aleksey Zdyumayev	Liberal Democratic Party	5,628	7.54%
Kristina Novikova	New People	4,877	6.54%
Olga Chernova	Party of Pensioners	2,055	2.75%
Total		74,596	100%

==== District 18 ====
Summary of the 18–20 September 2026 Legislative Assembly of Nizhny Novgorod Oblast election in District 18
Candidate	Party	Votes	%
Leonid Litvinenko	United Russia	40,433	63.38%
Aleksey Katkov	Communist Party	7,141	11.19%
Roman Ilyinsky	Liberal Democratic Party	4,449	6.97%
Angelina Golubeva	Party of Pensioners	3,777	5.92%
Denis Sitnikov	New People	3,712	5.82%
Vladimir Ivantsov	A Just Russia	3,635	5.70%
Total		63,796	100%

==== District 19 ====
Summary of the 18–20 September 2026 Legislative Assembly of Nizhny Novgorod Oblast election in District 19
Candidate	Party	Votes	%
Rustam Dosayev	United Russia	36,569	61.25%
Aleksandr Lavrinov	Communist Party	7,818	13.09%
Natalya Ptushko	Liberal Democratic Party	6,980	11.69%
Irina Komarova	Party of Pensioners	3,931	6.58%
Oleg Fedorichev	New People	3,904	6.54%
Total		59,704	100%

==== District 20 ====
Summary of the 18–20 September 2026 Legislative Assembly of Nizhny Novgorod Oblast election in District 20
Candidate	Party	Votes	%
Valery Antipov (incumbent)	United Russia	40,750	69.14%
Yevgeny Sakharov	Communist Party	6,648	11.28%
Vladimir Yershov	Liberal Democratic Party	4,148	7.04%
Natalya Dobrovoltseva	A Just Russia	3,570	6.06%
Olga Nazarova	Party of Pensioners	3,054	5.18%
Total		58,936	100%

==== District 21 ====
Summary of the 18–20 September 2026 Legislative Assembly of Nizhny Novgorod Oblast election in District 21
Candidate	Party	Votes	%
Konstantin Dezhurnov	United Russia	45,305	62.67%
Maksim Protasov	Communist Party	7,344	10.16%
Kirill Vaganov	Liberal Democratic Party	6,868	9.50%
Andrey Krylov	A Just Russia	5,020	6.94%
Dmitry Barutkin	New People	3,845	5.32%
German Shulpin	Party of Pensioners	2,333	3.23%
Total		72,295	100%

==== District 22 ====
Summary of the 18–20 September 2026 Legislative Assembly of Nizhny Novgorod Oblast election in District 22
Candidate	Party	Votes	%
Vladimir Bespalov (incumbent)	United Russia	35,405	55.34%
Nikolay Ryazanov	Communist Party	8,368	13.08%
Roman Atmakhov	Liberal Democratic Party	8,051	12.58%
Tatyana Danilova	New People	5,148	8.05%
Mikhail Filippov	A Just Russia	4,360	6.81%
Olga Zhukova	Party of Pensioners	1,893	2.96%
Total		63,981	100%

==== District 23 ====
Summary of the 18–20 September 2026 Legislative Assembly of Nizhny Novgorod Oblast election in District 23
Candidate	Party	Votes	%
Aleksandr Sharonov (incumbent)	United Russia	40,660	57.75%
Kristina Abramova	Communist Party	9,666	13.73%
Roman Rudnev	Liberal Democratic Party	8,035	11.41%
Vitaly Gradoboyev	New People	5,222	7.42%
Sergey Aleshkin	A Just Russia	3,842	5.46%
Viktor Sandulyak	Party of Pensioners	2,364	3.36%
Total		70,405	100%

==== District 24 ====
Summary of the 18–20 September 2026 Legislative Assembly of Nizhny Novgorod Oblast election in District 24
Candidate	Party	Votes	%
Aleksey Stepanov (incumbent)	United Russia	38,360	60.75%
Sergey Stryapshin	Communist Party	7,118	11.27%
Natalya Azikova	New People	5,448	8.63%
Aleksandr Sidelnikov	Liberal Democratic Party	5,445	8.62%
Lyudmila Larina	Party of Pensioners	3,438	5.44%
Igor Yarov	A Just Russia	2,667	4.22%
Total		63,148	100%

==== District 25 ====
Summary of the 18–20 September 2026 Legislative Assembly of Nizhny Novgorod Oblast election in District 25
Candidate	Party	Votes	%
Aleksandr Tabachnikov (incumbent)	United Russia	39,673	63.83%
Olga Yumakova	Communist Party	7,768	12.50%
Sergey Kostyunin	Liberal Democratic Party	4,605	7.41%
Aleksey Vtyurin	New People	4,033	6.49%
Aleksandr Skvortsov	A Just Russia	3,053	4.91%
Aleksey Smirnov	Party of Pensioners	2,205	3.55%
Total		62,158	100%

=== Members ===
Incumbent deputies are highlighted with bold, elected members who declined to take a seat are marked with ~~strikethrough~~.

Constituency
No.	Member	Party
1	Kirill Epstein	United Russia
2	Vadim Pichugin	United Russia
3	Vladimir Moskalenko	United Russia
4	Vasily Sukhanov	United Russia
5	Mikhail Morozov	United Russia
6	Ilya Khramov	United Russia
7	Maksim Rebrov	United Russia
8	Yury Balashov	United Russia
9	Natalya Smotrakova	United Russia
10	Anton Greben	United Russia
11	Andrey Kuvaev	United Russia
12	Yevgeny Lyulin	United Russia
13	Igor Norenkov	United Russia
14	Igor Tyurin	United Russia
15	Aleksandr Barykov	United Russia
16	Yury Yakimov	United Russia
17	Dmitry Krasnov	United Russia
18	Leonid Litvinenko	United Russia
19	Rustam Dosayev	United Russia
20	Valery Antipov	United Russia
21	Konstantin Dezhurnov	United Russia
22	Vladimir Bespalov	United Russia
23	Aleksandr Sharonov	United Russia
24	Aleksey Stepanov	United Russia
25	Aleksandr Tabachnikov	United Russia

Party lists
Member	Party
~~Gleb Nikitin~~	United Russia
Olga Shchetinina	United Russia
~~Yulia Garevskaya~~	United Russia
~~Aleksandr Shchelokov~~	United Russia
Danila Kapanov	United Russia
Aleksey Antonov	United Russia
Pavel Igoshin	United Russia
Irina Makarova	United Russia
Nikolay Upirvitsky	United Russia
Roman Golubin	United Russia
Vladimir Pakov	United Russia
Vyacheslav Aksinyin	United Russia
Andrey Dranishnikov	United Russia
Aleksandr Timofeyev	United Russia
Vladimir Petrukhov	United Russia
Denis Bakiyev	United Russia
Anton Ananyin	United Russia
Dmitry Filipenko	United Russia
Aleksey Generalov	United Russia
~~Vladislav Yegorov~~	Communist Party
Roman Kabeshev	Communist Party
Lyudmila Burkova	Communist Party
Aleksandr Chernigin	Communist Party
Oleg Kiritsa	Communist Party
~~Leonid Slutsky~~	Liberal Democratic Party
~~Vladislav Atmakhov~~	Liberal Democratic Party
Dmitry Yelizarov	Liberal Democratic Party
Aleksey Zdyumayev	Liberal Democratic Party
~~Pavel Solodkiy~~	New People
Oleg Gusarovsky	New People
Arsen Krbashyan	New People
Tatyana Grinevich	A Just Russia

== See also ==
- 2026 Russian regional elections
