= Olga Shchetinina =

- Ольга Щетинина
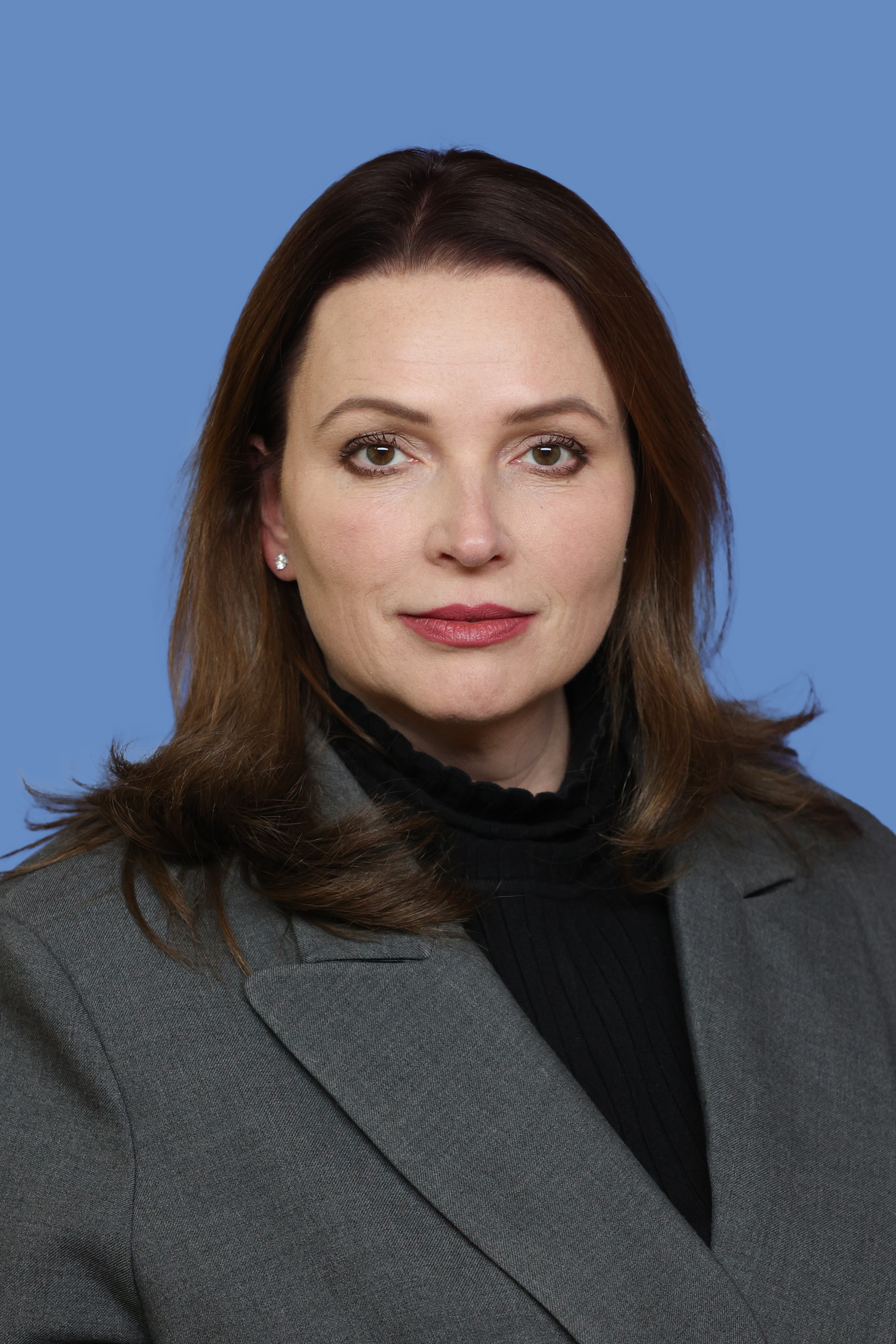

Senator from Nizhny Novgorod Oblast
- Incumbent
- Assumed office 12 December 2023
- Preceded by: Vladimir Lebedev

Personal details
- Born: 9 May 1971 (age 55) Karaul, RSFSR, Soviet Union
- Party: United Russia
- Education: Nizhny Novgorod Institute of Administration; Russian Presidential Academy of National Economy and Public Administration
- Awards: Medal of the Order "For Merit to the Fatherland"

Olga Vladimirovna Shchetinina (Russian: Ольга Владимировна Щетинина; born March 30, 1975, Gorky) is a Russian politician and senator of the Federation Council representing the executive body of state power in the Nizhny Novgorod Oblast. By resolution, she was appointed to the Federation Council Committee on Science, Education, and Culture.

== Biography ==
She holds two higher education degrees. In 1997, she graduated from the Volga-Vyatka Academy of Public Administration under the president of the Russian Federation with a degree in public and municipal administration and a management qualification. In 2020, she graduated from the Russian Presidential Academy of National Economy and Public Administration (researcher, research teacher).

From 1996 to 1999, she served as project implementation manager for M. Meesenburg-Russia LLC, a subsidiary of M. Meesenburg GmbH in Russia.

From 1999 to 2000, she was the regional representative of the Tika Group of Companies (Moscow).

From 2000 to 2002, she served as Director of Bazalt-2000 LLC (Nizhny Novgorod).

From September 2002 to June 2007, she served as Head of the Public Relations Department and First Deputy Head of the Regional Executive Committee of the United Russia party in the Nizhny Novgorod Region.

From June 2007 to March 2011, she served as Chief of Staff of the United Russia faction in the Legislative Assembly of Nizhny Novgorod Oblast.

From 2011 to 2014, she served as Head of the Regional Executive Committee of United Russia and Deputy Secretary of the Regional Office for Work with Deputies and Deputy Associations.

From 2011 to 2023, she served as a Deputy of the Legislative Assembly of the Nizhny Novgorod Oblast.

Before her election to the Federation Council, she served as First Deputy Chairman of the Legislative Assembly of the Nizhny Novgorod Oblast.

=== Federation Council ===
Since December 12, 2023, she has been a member of the Federation Council of the Russian Federation (senator) representing the executive body of state power of the Nizhny Novgorod Oblast. She was appointed by the regional governor, Gleb Nikitin. The previous representative of the regional administration in the Federation Council, Vladimir Lebedev, died on November 30, 2023.
