= Alexander Vainberg =

Russian politician (born 1961)

- Александр Вайнберг
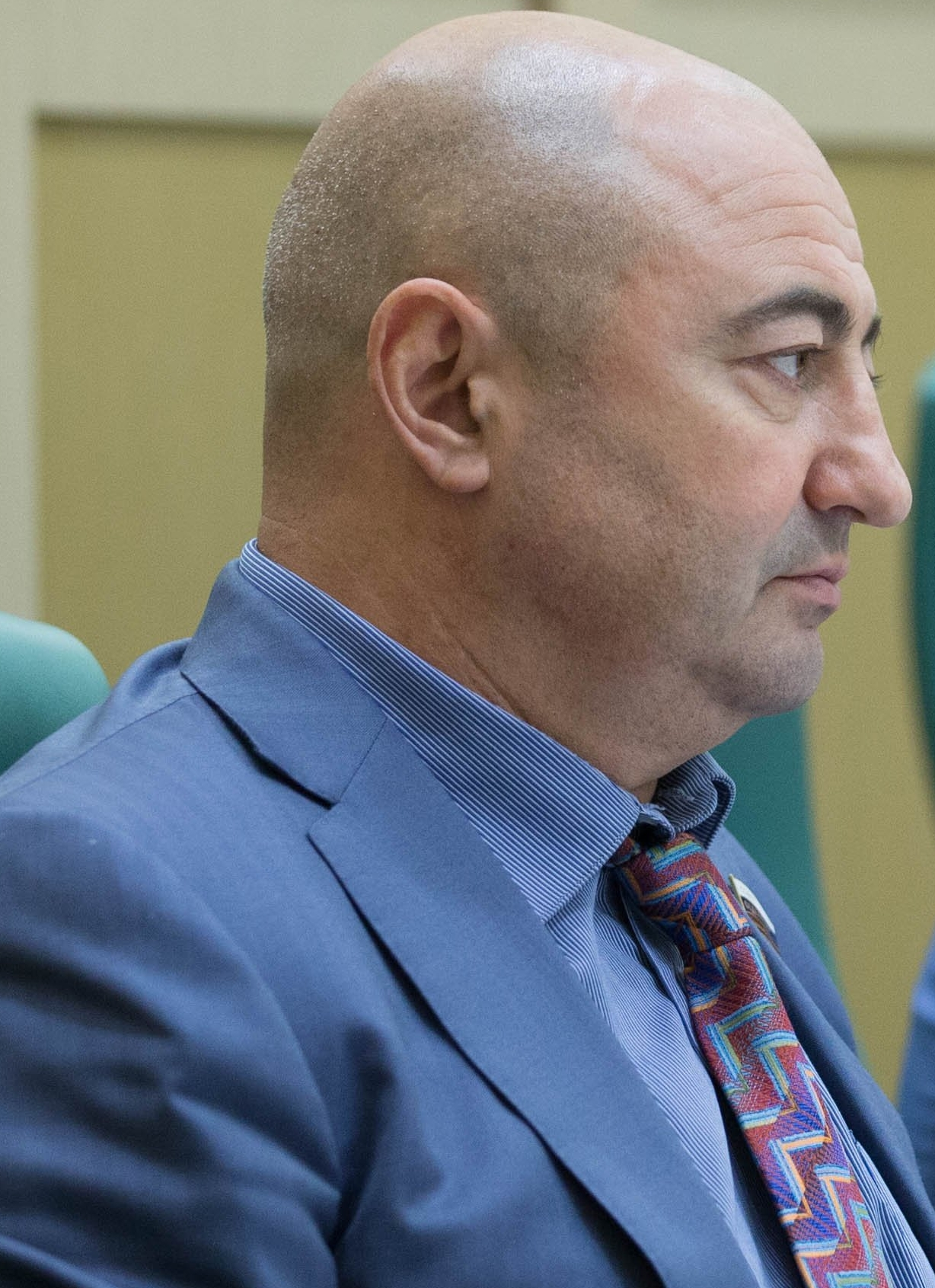

Senator from Nizhny Novgorod Oblast
- In office 6 October 2021 – 28 January 2026
- Preceded by: Leonid Belov
- Succeeded by: Dmitry Krasnov

Personal details
- Born: Alexander Vainberg; 2 February 1961 (age 65) Nizhny Novgorod Oblast, Russian Soviet Socialist Republic, Soviet Union
- Party: United Russia
- Education: Gorky State Pedagogical Institute

Alexander Vladelenovich Vainberg (Russian: Александр Владеленович Вайнберг; born 2 February 1961) is a Russian politician serving as a senator from Nizhny Novgorod Oblast since 6 October 2021.

== Biography ==
Alexander Vainberg was born on 2 February 1961 in Nizhny Novgorod Oblast. In 1992, he graduated from the Gorky State Pedagogical Institute. From 1980 to 1982, Vainberg served in the Soviet Army. As a student, he moved to Moscow to start a musical career, and he even got accepted as a guitarist to the Lyube band. In 1995, he also founded his own band called "Nashe delo". In 1999, he also started to be engaged in politics and, in 2002, joined the Unity party. From 2006 to 2011, he was the deputy of the Legislative Assembly of Nizhny Novgorod Oblast of the 4th, 5th, and 6th convocations. From March 2006 to March 2009, Vainberg headed the regional branch of United Russia. On 23 June 2011, he became the senator from the Legislative Assembly of Nizhny Novgorod Oblast. Later, he was re-elected. His last term started on 6 October 2021.

Alexander Vainberg is under personal sanctions introduced by the European Union, the United Kingdom, the USA, Canada, Switzerland, Australia, Ukraine, New Zealand, for ratifying the decisions of the "Treaty of Friendship, Cooperation and Mutual Assistance between the Russian Federation and the Donetsk People's Republic and between the Russian Federation and the Luhansk People's Republic" and providing political and economic support for Russia's annexation of Ukrainian territories.

On 28 January 2026, Vainberg resigned from the Federation Council to undertake military service in Ukraine.
