= Ivan Sklyarov =

Russian politician

- Иван Скляров
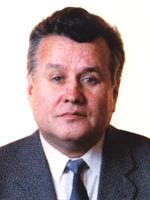

2nd Governor of Nizhny Novgorod Oblast
- In office 13 July 1997 – 5 August 2001
- Preceded by: Boris Nemtsov
- Succeeded by: Gennady Khodyrev

2nd Mayor of Nizhny Novgorod
- In office 1 April 1994 – June 1997
- Preceded by: Dimity Bedyankov
- Succeeded by: Vladimir Gorin (acting)

Personal details
- Born: 22 March 1947 Yevstratovka, Russian SFSR, Soviet Union
- Died: 26 February 2007 (aged 59) Nizhny Novgorod, Russia

Ivan Petrovich Sklyarov (Russian: Иван Петрович Скляров; 22 June 1948 – 26 February 2007) was a Russian politician. He served as the Mayor of Nizhny Novgorod 1994–1997, and the Governor of Nizhny Novgorod Oblast in 1997–2001. He was also awarded the title of Honorary Citizen of Nizhny Novgorod.

== Early life and education ==
Ivan Sklyarov was born in Yevstratovka on 22 March 1947. He graduated from the Arzamas instrument-making technical College and then the Moscow Aviation Institute (MAI), specialty-engineer-mechanic. He worked at the Arzamas Instrument-Building Plant.

== Political career ==
- 1985 to 1991 – Chairman of the Arzamas city Executive Committee of Soviet of people's deputies in 1991 as the first Secretary of the Arzamas city Committee of the CPSU
- 1990–1993 – member of the Supreme Council of the RSFSR
- 1991–1994 – Vice-Governor of Nizhny Novgorod region
- 1994–1997 – the mayor of Nizhny Novgorod
- 1997–2001 – Governor of Nizhny Novgorod region. As the Governor entered the Council of the Federation, was Chairman of the Committee on Federation Affairs, Federal Treaty and regional policy.
- 2005–2007 – member of the Legislative Assembly of Nizhny Novgorod region.

== Activities as Governor ==
In the elections received the support of the Association of Industrialists and entrepreneurs, the agro-industrial Union region, stood as the successor to Boris Nemtsov. Despite this, shortly after the election announced conducted by the predecessor policy is wrong, and "the only political force on which he focuses," called mayor Yuriy Luzhkov. Positioning itself as a "good Manager", Sklyarov seeks to maximize the participation in the management of the region's economy. Most notable was a project of creation on the basis of the Kstovo Refinery regional oil refining company on the model of "Moscow oil company". The first time the policy Sklyarov had a significant impact Sergei Kiriyenko, and after his resignation from the post of Prime Minister of Russia in the region began to increase the influence of big business. In 2000, Kstovskiy refinery (NORSI) came under the control of "LUKOIL", the leading petrochemical enterprises of the region included in SIBUR, and the GAZ came under the management of the group "Russian aluminium" Oleg Deripaska. In 1998, for the upcoming 200-year anniversary of the birth of Alexander Pushkin Sklyarov appealed to the Russian Orthodox Church with a proposal to canonize the poet. The Chairman of the Synodal Commission on the glorification of the saints, Metropolitan Juvenal (Poyarkov) said: "a Politician who calls himself Orthodox, should know what to make of the proposal of canonization is the prerogative only of priests". Sklyarov was also known for other strange initiatives (for example, was going to apply for carrying out in Nizhni Novgorod the Olympic games or to give the President of the Republic of Tatarstan Kazan icon of the mother of God — a symbol of victory over the Tatars) and meaningless or grammatically incorrect statements was "not sparkling education". Despite the revival in the economy, social sphere and living standards of Nizhny Novgorod has left much to be desired and the region intensified protests. As a result, the 2001 elections with low voter turnout Ivan Sklyarov lost to the member of the Communist Party of the Russian Federation Gennady Khodyrev.

== After retirement ==
After his resignation as governor, Sklyarov worked as Deputy General Director of JSC "Nizhegorodsvyazinform" (2002 – OJSC "VolgaTelecom". In 2005 he was elected Deputy of the Legislative Assembly, headed the Committee on state and local governments. Ivan Petrovich Sklyarov died after a long illness on 26 February 2007. He was buried at the Bugrovsky cemetery (Red cemetery) in Nizhny Novgorod.
