= Nikolai Kulikovsky =

Second husband of Grand Duchess Olga Alexandrovna of Russia (1881–1958)

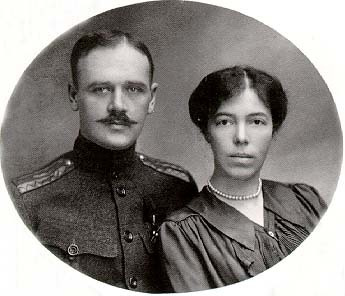
- Kulikovsky with his wife Olga
- Born: Nikolai Alexandrovich Kulikovsky; 5 November 1881; Yevstratovka, Russia
- Died: 11 August 1958 (aged 76); Cooksville, Ontario, Canada
- Spouse: Grand Duchess Olga Alexandrovna of Russia (m. 1916)
- Children: Tikhon Nikolaevich (1917–1993); Guri Nikolaevich (1919–1984)
- Parents: Alexander Nikanorovich Kulikovsky (father); Eudoxia Nikolaevna Kharina (mother)

Nikolai Alexandrovich Kulikovsky (Russian: Николай Александрович Куликовский; 5 November 1881 – 11 August 1958) was the second husband of Grand Duchess Olga Alexandrovna of Russia, the sister of Tsar Nicholas II and daughter of Tsar Alexander III.

He was born into a military landowning family from the south of the Russian Empire, and followed the family tradition by entering the army. In 1903, he was noticed by Grand Duchess Olga during a military review, and they became close friends. Olga wanted to divorce her first husband, Duke Peter Alexandrovich of Oldenburg, and marry Kulikovsky, but neither her husband nor her brother, the Tsar, would allow it.

During World War I, Olga eventually obtained a divorce and married Kulikovsky. They had two sons. Her brother was deposed in the Russian Revolution of 1917, and Kulikovsky was dismissed from the army by the revolutionary government. The Kulikovskys were forced into exile, and he became a farmer and businessman in Denmark, where they lived until after World War II. In 1948, they emigrated to Canada as agricultural immigrants, but within four years of their arrival, they had sold their farm and moved into a small suburban house. Nikolai Kulikovsky became increasingly disabled by back pain and died in 1958, aged 76.

== Early life ==
Nikolai Kulikovsky was born on 5 November 1881 into a minor noble family at the estate of Yevstratovka, in Voronezh Governorate, Russia. His father was Alexander Nikanorovich Kulikovsky, a major general of the Imperial Russian Army, and his mother was Eudoxia Nikolaevna Kharina. His grandfather was a general during the Napoleonic Wars, and his family owned two large estates in Ukraine. He rode from an early age, became an expert horseman, and was educated at the Petrograd Real College of Gurevich, then at the Nicholas Cavalry College, where he graduated with a degree.

He joined Her Majesty's Life Guards Cuirassier Regiment (Blue Cuirassiers) of the Imperial Russian Army shortly before 1903. Grand Duke Michael, the younger brother of Tsar Nicholas II, was the regiment's honorary colonel. In April 1903, during a military parade at the Pavlovsk Palace, Grand Duchess Olga, the youngest sister of Nicholas and Michael, saw Kulikovsky and begged Michael to arrange the seating at a casual luncheon so that she and Kulikovsky were adjacent. The Grand Duchess was already married to Duke Peter Alexandrovich of Oldenburg, who was covertly believed by his friends and family to be homosexual. A few days after her brief meeting with Kulikovsky, Olga asked Oldenburg for a divorce, which he refused with the qualification that he would reconsider his decision after seven years.

Kulikovsky was appointed as captain in the Blue Cuirassiers and posted to the provinces. By 1906, he and Olga were corresponding regularly, when Olga's husband, Duke Peter, appointed Kulikovsky as his aide-de-camp. With Peter's permission, Kulikovsky moved into the 200-room residence in Sergievskaya Street, Saint Petersburg, that Peter shared with Olga. According to a fellow officer, gossip about a possible romance between Kulikovsky and the Grand Duchess, based on little more than their holding hands in public, spread through high society.

== Marriage and revolution ==
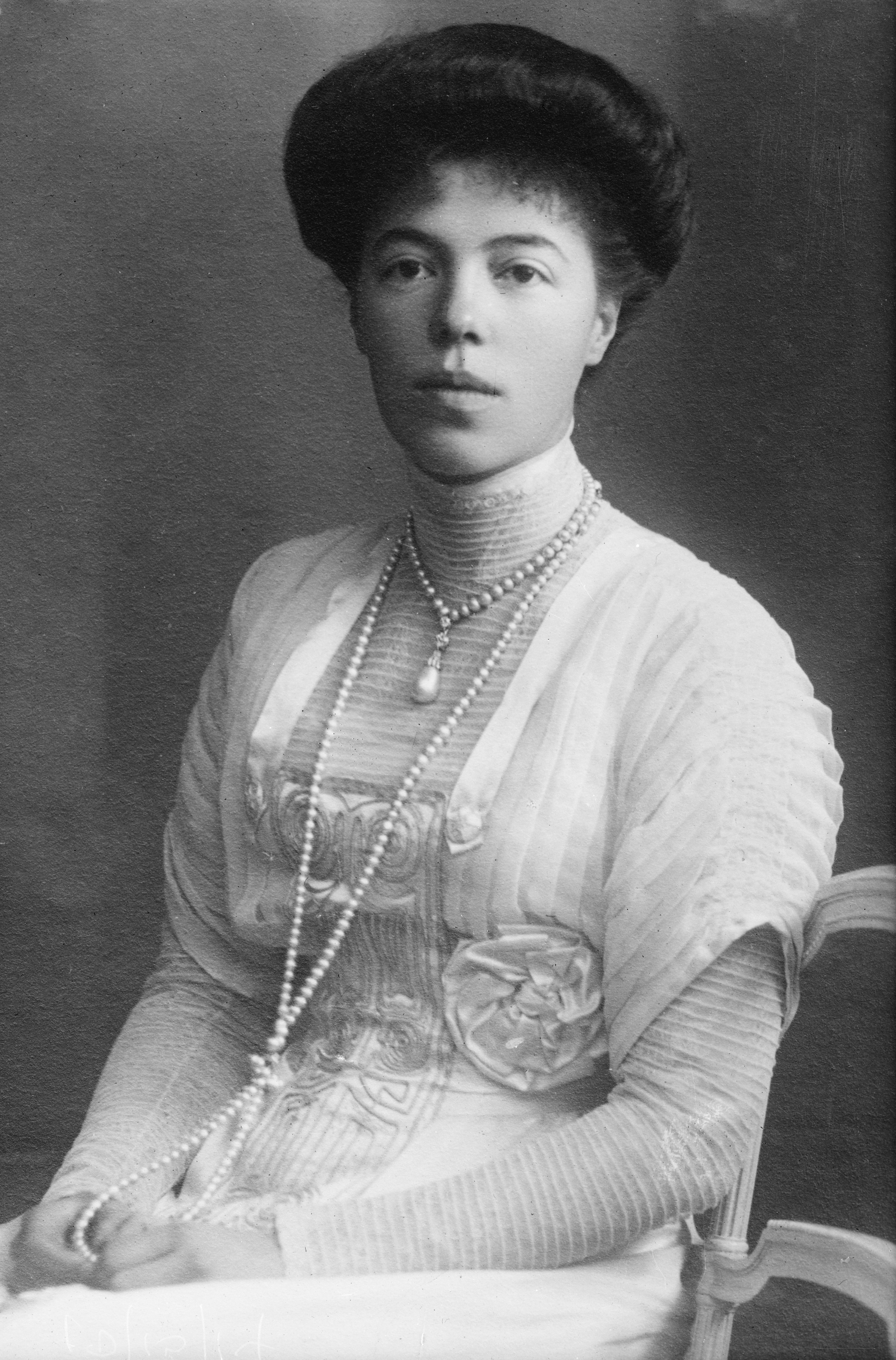
Grand Duchess Olga Alexandrovna

Though Olga repeatedly asked Tsar Nicholas II to allow her to divorce, her brother refused on religious and dynastic grounds; he believed marriage was for life and that royalty should marry within royalty. When their brother, Grand Duke Michael, eloped with his mistress, Natasha Wulfert, the Tsar and Olga were scandalized along with the rest of society. Natasha was a commoner who had been divorced twice, and one of her former husbands was an officer in the same regiment as Kulikovsky. Michael was banished from Russia, and the likelihood of the Tsar ever granting Olga's divorce, or permitting her to marry a commoner, looked remote.

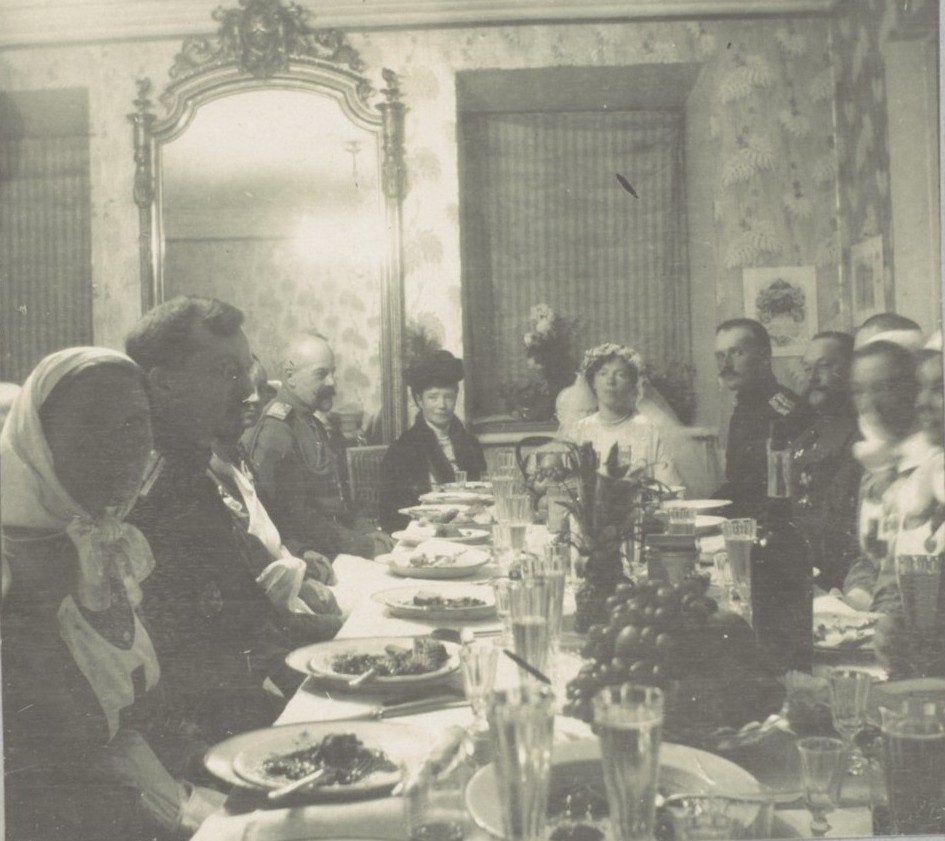
The wedding banquet, 16 November 1916

At the outbreak of World War I, Kulikovsky was sent to the front with his regiment. Michael was recalled from abroad, and Olga went to work in a military hospital as a nurse. Olga continued to press the Tsar to allow her divorce. In a letter she wrote, " ... finish with the divorce now during the war while all eyes and minds are occupied elsewhere—and such a small thing would be lost in all the greater things". The war went badly for the Russian imperial forces, and the Central Powers, led by Germany, advanced into Russia. Fearful for Kulikovsky's safety, Olga pleaded with the Tsar to transfer him to the relative safety of Kiev, where she was stationed at a hospital. On 16 October 1916, after visiting her in Kiev, the Tsar officially annulled her marriage to Duke Peter, and she married Kulikovsky on 16 November 1916, in the Kievo-Vasilievskaya Church on Triokhsviatitelskaya (Three Saints Street) in Kiev. Only the officiating priest, Olga's mother the Dowager Empress Marie, Olga's brother-in-law Grand Duke Alexander, two fellow nurses from the hospital in Kiev, and four officers of the Akhtyrsky regiment, of which Olga was honorary colonel, attended. Their two-week honeymoon was spent in a farmhouse in Podgorny that had belonged to family friends of the Kulikovskys. After visiting Kulikovsky's parents and grandmother in Kharkov, Olga and Kulikovsky returned to Kiev.

During the war, internal tensions and economic deprivation in Russia continued to mount, and revolutionary sympathies grew. After Nicholas II was deposed in early 1917, many members of the Romanov dynasty, including Nicholas and his immediate family, were held under house arrest. The new government retired Kulikovsky from the army as a lieutenant-colonel. Dowager Empress Marie, Grand Duke Alexander, Grand Duchess Olga, and Kulikovsky managed to escape to the Crimea, where they lived for a time before they too were placed under house arrest at one of the imperial estates. As a commoner, Kulikovsky was permitted more freedom of movement than the Romanovs, and was occasionally able to leave the estate in a pony-cart, which allowed him to run errands, obtain food, and seek news of the outside. On 12 August 1917, Olga and Kulikovsky's first child and son, Tikhon Nikolaievich, was born in Villa Ai-Todor, in the Crimea. He was named after one of the Grand Duchess's favourite saints, Tikhon of Zadonsk. Although the grandson of an emperor and the nephew of another, Tikhon received no titles because his father was a commoner.

As newspapers were banned and letters infrequent, the Romanovs under house arrest knew little of the fate of Tsar Nicholas and his family. Nicholas, his wife, and their children were originally held at their official residence, the Alexander Palace at Tsarskoye Selo, but the provisional government under Alexander Kerensky relocated them to Tobolsk, Siberia. Eventually, in July 1918, after being transferred to Yekaterinburg, Nicholas and his family were killed by their Bolshevik guards. In the Crimea, the Grand Duchess's family were condemned to death by the Yalta revolutionary council, but the executions were stayed by the Sevastopol council, who refused to act without orders from Moscow. In March 1918, German forces advanced on the Crimea, and the revolutionary guards were replaced by German ones.

When Germany surrendered to the Allies of World War I in November 1918, the German troops evacuated, allowing the surviving members of the imperial family time to escape abroad. The British warship HMS Marlborough rescued the Dowager Empress Marie and some of her family from the Crimea, but Grand Duchess Olga and Kulikovsky decided to stay in Russia and travelled to the Caucasus region, where the Bolsheviks had been pushed back by the White Army. During the journey, a coupling on the train carriage in which they were travelling developed a fault, possibly from sabotage, and Kulikovsky crawled over the carriage roofs to reach the driver and stop the train. In the Caucasus, Kulikovsky took a job on a farm because he was unable to secure a military posting in the White Army; the commanding general, Anton Denikin, wished to avoid association with the Romanovs. In a rented farmhouse at the large Cossack village of Novominskaya, Olga and Kulikovsky's second son, Guri Nikolaievich, was born on 23 April 1919. He was named after Guri Panaev, who had been killed serving in Olga's Akhtyrsky regiment. As the White Army was pushed back and the Red Army approached, the family set out on what would be their last journey through Russia; they travelled to Rostov-on-Don, and from there took refuge at Novorossiysk in the residence of the Danish consul, Thomas Schytte, who informed them of Dowager Empress Marie's safe arrival in Denmark.

After a brief stay with the Danish consul, the family were shipped to a refugee camp on the island of Büyükada in the Sea of Marmara near Istanbul, Turkey, where the Kulikovsky family shared three rooms with eleven other adults. After two weeks, they were evacuated to Belgrade in the Kingdom of Yugoslavia. The Yugoslav Regent Prince Alexander, later to become King Alexander I, offered them a permanent home there, but Dowager Empress Marie summoned her daughter to Denmark. The Grand Duchess complied, and the family arrived in Copenhagen on Good Friday 1920. They lived with Kulikovsky's mother-in-law, Dowager Empress Marie, at the Amalienborg Palace and then at the royal estate of Hvidøre. Kulikovsky and Marie did not get along; he was resentful of his wife acting as Marie's secretary and companion, and Marie was distant toward him.

== Danish residency and exodus ==
Without a role or rank, Kulikovsky brooded in Denmark, becoming moody and listless. A spinal injury sustained during the war, for which he had to wear a corset, remained unhealed. In 1925, Kulikovsky accompanied his wife to a Berlin nursing home to meet Anna Anderson, who claimed to be Olga's niece, Grand Duchess Anastasia Nikolaevna of Russia. According to Harriet von Rathlef, who witnessed the meeting, while Olga and Anderson conversed, he sat in a corner and sulked. Although Olga felt sympathy for Anderson, if only because she was ill, she eventually denounced her as an impostor. Possibly, she was pressured to do so by Kulikovsky and Dowager Empress Marie.

Marie died on 13 October 1928, and the Kulikovskys moved out of Hvidøre. After a brief stay in the Amalienborg Palace, the Kulikovskys moved to Holte, near Klampenborg, where a Danish millionaire, Gorm Rasmussen, engaged Kulikovsky to manage his stables. Hvidøre and some of Marie's jewellery were sold. With Olga's inheritance, Kulikovsky and his family were able to purchase Knudsminde Farm, several miles outside of Copenhagen. Kulikovsky was appointed to the board of a Russian insurance company based in Copenhagen and oversaw the farm's operations. The farm-estate became a centre for the Russian monarchist and anti-Bolshevik community in Denmark.

On 2 February 1935, he and Olga attended and acted as godparents to the baptism of Aleksander Schalburg, the son of Christian Frederik von Schalburg.

On 9 April 1940, neutral Denmark was invaded by Nazi Germany and was occupied for the rest of World War II. As Olga's sons, Tikhon and Guri, served as officers in the Danish Royal Army, they were interned as prisoners of war, but their imprisonment in a Copenhagen hotel lasted less than two months. Other Russian émigrés, keen to fight against the Soviets, enlisted in the German forces. Despite her sons' internment and her mother's Danish origins, Olga was implicated in her compatriots' collusion with German forces, as she continued to meet and extend help to Russian émigrés fighting against communism. After the surrender of Germany in 1945, the Soviet Union wrote to the Danish government accusing the Grand Duchess of conspiracy against the Soviet authorities. With the end of the war, Soviet troops occupied the easternmost part of Denmark, and Olga grew fearful of an assassination or kidnapping attempt. She decided to move her family across the Atlantic to the relative safety of rural Canada, a decision with which Kulikovsky complied.

== Later life and death ==
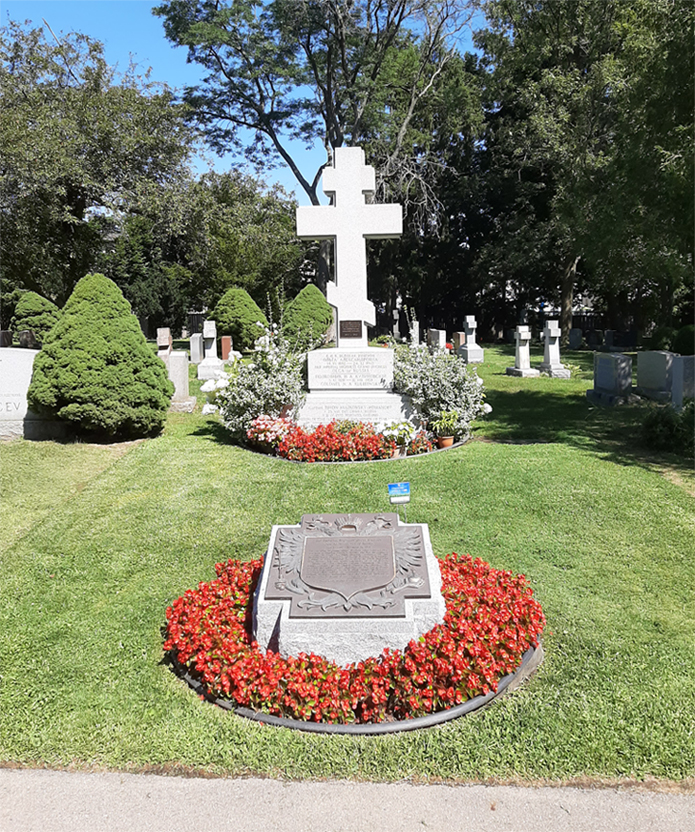
Kulikovsky's grave site at York Cemetery, Toronto

In May 1948, the Kulikovskys travelled to London by Danish troopship. They were housed in a grace-and-favour apartment at Hampton Court Palace while arrangements were made for their journey to Canada as agricultural immigrants. On 2 June 1948, Kulikovsky, Olga, Tikhon and his Danish-born wife Agnete, Guri and his Danish-born wife Ruth, Guri and Ruth's two children, Xenia and Leonid, and Olga's companion and former maid Emilia Tenso ("Mimka") departed Liverpool on board the Empress of Canada. After a rough crossing, the ship docked at Halifax, Nova Scotia. The family proceeded to Toronto, where they lived until they purchased a 200-acre (0.8 km^{2}) farm in Halton County, Ontario, near Campbellville. Kulikovsky was relieved to move out of Toronto and escape media attention.

By 1952, the farm had become a burden to the elderly couple. Their sons had moved away, labour was hard to come by, Kulikovsky suffered increasing back pain and disability, whilst some of Olga's remaining jewellery was stolen. The farm was sold, and Kulikovsky, Olga, and Mimka moved to a smaller 5-room house at 2130 Camilla Road, Cooksville, Ontario, a suburb of Toronto (now amalgamated into the city of Mississauga). Mimka suffered a stroke that left her disabled, and Olga nursed her until Mimka died in 1954. Neighbours and visitors to the region, including foreign and royal dignitaries, took interest in Olga as the "last Romanov", and visited their small home, which also attracted Romanov impostors whom both Kulikovsky and Olga considered a menace. Welcome visitors included Princess Marina, Duchess of Kent, the daughter of her first cousin Grand Duchess Elena Vladimirovna of Russia, in 1954.

By 1952, Kulikovsky had shrunk more than 4 inches (10 cm) from his peak height of 6 ft 2 inches (188 cm). He distrusted conventional medicine and tried homoeopathy instead. By 1958, he was virtually paralyzed and had difficulty sleeping. At the end of his life, he was sleeping on the sofa in the living room of the couple's Cooksville house to avoid waking his wife. Kulikovsky died there on the night of 11 August 1958. His estate was valued at 12,123.47 Canadian dollars, about 98,000 Canadian dollars as of 2012. The Grand Duchess died two years later and was interred next to her husband in York Cemetery, Toronto.
