= Vladimir Lebedev =

Vladimir Lebedev may refer to:

- Vladimir Lebedev (artist) (1891–1967), Soviet painter and graphic artist
- Vladimir Lebedev (politician) (1962–2023), Russian politician
- Vladimir Lebedev (skier) (born 1984), Russian freestyle skier
