= Governor of Nizhny Novgorod Oblast =

Highest-ranking official in Nizhny Novgorod Oblast, Russia

- Coat of Arms of Nizhny Novgorod Oblast

- Flag of Nizhny Novgorod Oblast

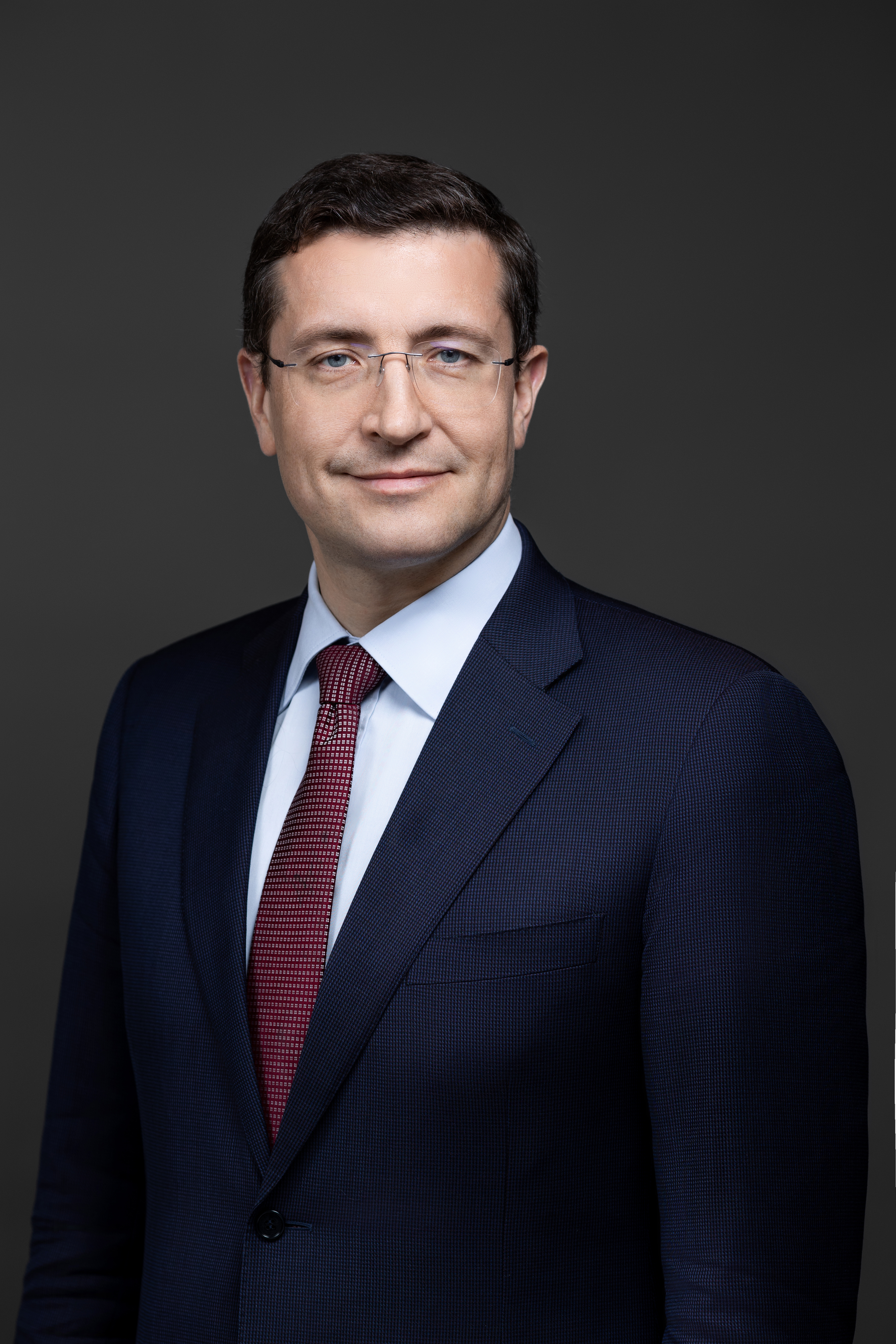
- Incumbent; Gleb Nikitin since 26 September 2017
- Residence: House of Legislative Assembly, Nizhny Novgorod Kremlin
- Term length: 5 years, renewable once
- Inaugural holder: Boris Nemtsov
- Formation: November 30, 1991
- Website: nobl.ru

The Governor of Nizhny Novgorod Oblast (Russian: Губернатор Нижегородской области) is the head of Nizhny Novgorod Oblast.

== History ==
=== Imperial era ===
In the Nizhny Novgorod Governorate, the post of governor appeared on 6 February [O.S. January 26] 1714. Then Tsar Peter I appointed Andrei Izmailov, a close Pantler of Tsar Ivan V and ambassador to Denmark, who arrived at his residence in the Nizhny Novgorod Kremlin on April 5 [O.S. March 25] 1714, to this position. The staff of the Nizhny Novgorod Governorate office was formed.

At this time, Russia was waging the Northern War with Sweden, so the Nizhny Novgorod garrison came under the control of the governor.

In 1714, after the death of Izmailov, Stepan Putyagin was appointed governor. During his reign, on July 6 [O.S. June 25] 1715, a great fire broke out in Nizhny Novgorod. The governor's house, the provincial office and hundreds of private houses burned down. On 30 [O.S. March 19] 1717, he died and his duties were transferred to the Kazan governor.

In 1719, Peter I carried out an administrative reform, and on June 9 [O.S. May 29] 1719, according to his decree “On the organization of Governorates”, the position of vice-governor was formed. In the newly formed Nizhny Novgorod Governorate, it was occupied by Yuri Rzhevsky. Under his rule, in 1722, the Nizhny Novgorod shipyard was launched and the St. Alexis Church was completed.

From 1764 to 1770, Yakov Arshenevsky held the post of governor. During his governorship, Empress Catherine II came to Nizhny Novgorod. Then she remained dissatisfied with the development of Nizhny Novgorod:

Сей город ситуациею прекрасен, а строением мерзок ... всё или на боку лежит, или близко того.
This city is a beautiful location, but the buildings is ugly ... everything either lies on its side, or it will soon fall.

On 24 [O.S. April 13] 1768, a decree was issued to draw up a project for a new development of the city. Arshenevsky traveled to St. Petersburg in 1770 to participate in its development. The project was approved by Catherine II in Tsarskoye Selo on 24 [O.S. April 13] 1770. It provided for the construction of straight wide streets radiating from the Dmitrievskaya Tower of the Kremlin. However, Arshenevsky died in 1771 before the plan was implemented.

Coat of arms of Nizhny Novgorod Governorate

On 20 [O.S. December 8] 1856, the provinces had their own coats of arms. In the Nizhny Novgorod Governorate, it was a scarlet deer on a silver shield, bordered by oak leaves with ribbon of Order of St. Andrew and the Great Imperial Crown. During this period, from September 10 (22), 1856, Alexander Muravyov held the post of governor. He stood at the origins of the Decembrist movement and prepared the peasant reform in the Nizhny Novgorod Governorate. On 28 [O.S. September 16] 1861, he was replaced by Alexei Odintsov, who was awarded the title of honorary resident of Nizhny Novgorod and established a scholarship named after him at the Nizhny Novgorod Men's Gymnasium (now the second building of the Nizhny Novgorod State Pedagogical University).

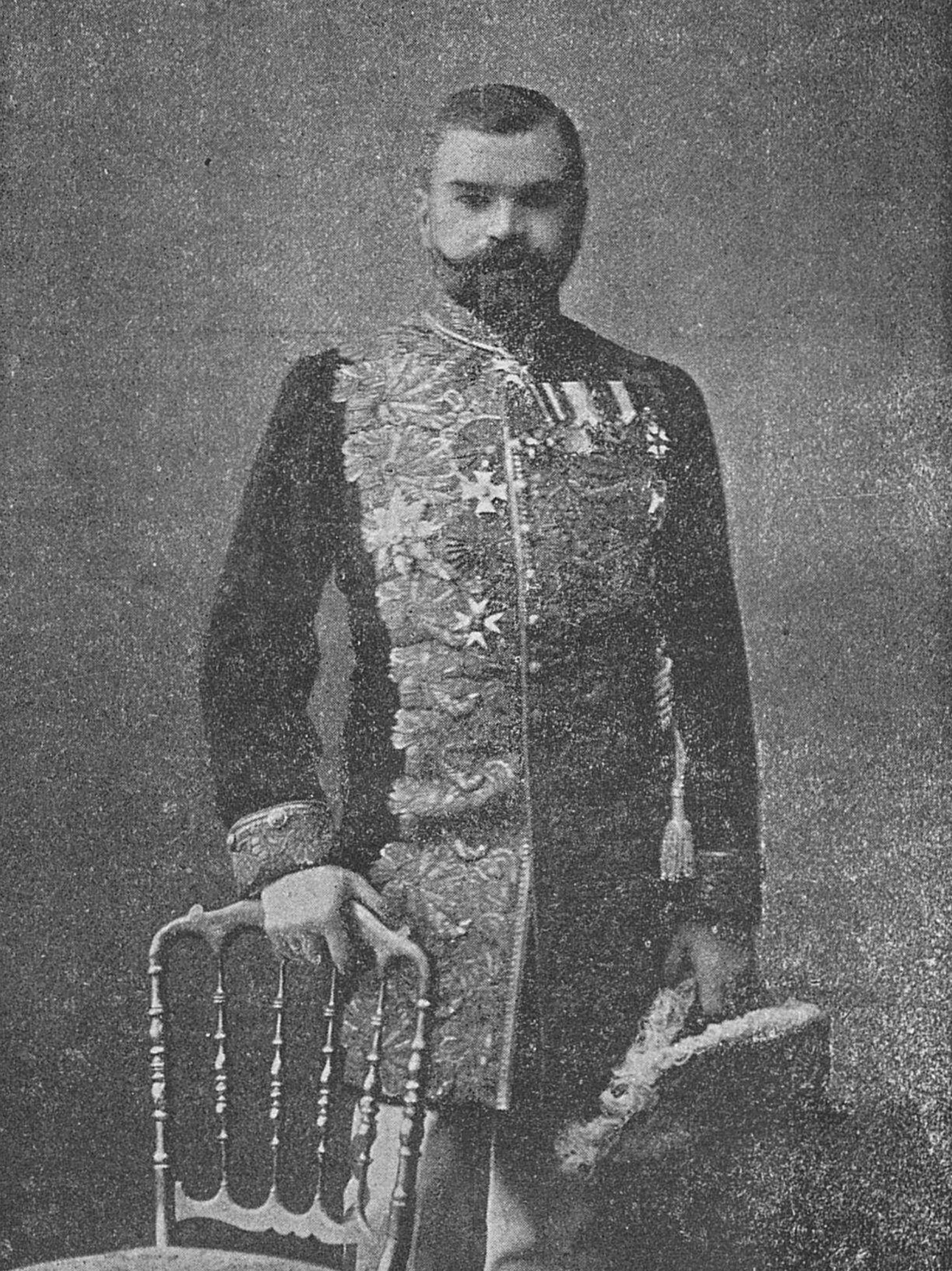
Alexei Fedorovich Giers

The last governor of Nizhny Novgorod Governorate, before the restoration of this post, was Alexei Giers. He was appointed to this post in 1915, after the end of the governorship in the Minsk Governorate. At that time, the World War I with Germany was going on in Russia. Nizhny Novgorod was a deep rear city, so refugees from all western provinces came here. Giers obliged Nizhny Novgorod merchants to allocate funds to help those in need and organized a fund. The governor himself also donated personal jewels. He organized the evacuation of factories from the western provinces: Felser and Etna, as well as the construction of the Siemens and Halske factories (now Nitel plant). He exercised control over the partial mobilization of Nizhny Novgorod residents and in the formation of the Nizhny Novgorod garrison before being sent to the front. On 31 [O.S. January 17] 1916, Giers opened the first Nizhny Novgorod People's University. The situation in the city and province was complicated by mass strikes of workers and revolutionary movements. After the February Revolution on 15 [O.S. March 2] 1917 , he was arrested and sent to Moscow.

=== Soviet era ===
In the Soviet era, the leading role in the leadership of the region was occupied by the Gorky Regional Committee of the CPSU. June 1988 to November 1991, the first secretary of the Gorky Regional Committee of the CPSU was Gennady Khodyrev.

In 1990, there was a sharp decline in the influence of party committees in connection with the abolition on March 14, 1990 of Article 6 of the Constitution of the USSR, which determined the "leading and guiding role" of the CPSU. Russian regions actually began to develop according to the model of a “parliamentary republic”. As a result, the first person in the region was the chairman of the regional council of people's deputies. Most of the leaders of the regional party committees sought to be elected as the chairman of the regional council and combine both positions - the Constitution and legislation did not prohibit this. This happened in the Gorky region - in April 1990, Gennady Khodyrev became chairman of the Gorky regional council, while remaining the first secretary of the regional committee. However, on June 20, 1990, the First Congress of People's Deputies of the RSFSR adopted the Decree “On the Mechanism of Democracy in the RSFSR”, which said: “The position of the head of a state authority or government with any other position, including political or public, is not allowed in the RSFSR political organizations.” Thus, the first secretaries who combined the posts of the party and Soviet leaders of the region were presented with a choice: first, between subordination and disobedience to the Russian Congress; secondly, in case of consent to submit, between two posts. Gennady Khodyrev, like some other first secretaries of the regional committees, decided not to obey and remained in both posts.

On October 22, 1990, by decree of the Presidium of the Supreme Council of the RSFSR, the Gorky Region was renamed the Nizhny Novgorod Region. On April 21, 1992, the Congress of People's Deputies of the RSFSR approved the renaming of the region by amending Art. 71 of the Constitution of the RSFSR of 1978, which entered into force May 16, 1992 from the date of publication in the “Rossiyskaya Gazeta”.

On August 19, 1991, during the August coup, Gennady Khodyrev was on vacation near Foros. Having returned after the GKChP defeat, he had to make a choice: whether to remain at the head of the regional committee of the CPSU-KP of the RSFSR or strengthen his position as chairman of the Regional Council of People's Deputies. Khodyrev chose to remain the head of the regional committee (however, on November 6, the CPSU was banned for supporting the putsch). He was replaced by the chairman of the regional Council of People’s Deputies was elected Evgeny Krestyaninov.

Since the end of 1991, the main mechanism for the legitimization of regional government bodies has been associated with the popularity of the president of Russia, Boris Yeltsin, who received legitimacy in a popular vote. At the beginning of the cardinal changes, the President of Russia had virtually unlimited powers to form the executive branch in the constituent entities of the Russian Federation. It was assumed that the election of regional leaders would be introduced in all regions. In August 1991, Russian President Boris Yeltsin promised that elections would be held as soon as possible, but a new institution was created for the transitional period — the head of the regional administration appointed by the president (administration refers to a regional executive body). On November 30, 1991, 32-year-old Boris Nemtsov was appointed head of the administration of the Nizhny Novgorod Region by presidential decree.

At the suggestion of Nemtsov, the Regional Council approved a new job title - the governor.

December 17, 1995 in the Nizhny Novgorod region held the first election of the governor. The largest number of votes (58.37%) was gained by the current governor Boris Nemtsov. The Kommersant newspaper wrote that in 1995 Boris Nemtsov “earned the notoriety of a reformer”, whose experience in the restructuring of the economy of a particular region was recommended by the government everywhere.

Nemtsov’s term of office was 4 years. However, only 2 years later, on March 17, 1997, the politician was appointed First Deputy Prime Minister of the Russian Government in the second government of Viktor Chernomyrdin. Acting governor of the Nizhny Novgorod Region became Vice Governor Yuri Lebedev.

Early elections were held on June 29, 1997. None of the candidates gained more than 50% of the vote, and the mayor of Nizhny Novgorod Ivan Sklyarov (40.95%) and the State Duma deputy from the Communist Party Gennady Khodyrev (37.84%) got into the second round. In the second round on July 13, Ivan Sklyarov won with 52% of the vote.

== Powers and duties ==
The governor holds many powers and duties:

- The governor is the highest official of the Oblast and the chairman of the government.
- The governor is actively involved in the legislative process; they may introduce legislation, and have the power to veto bills passed by the Legislative Assembly of Nizhny Novgorod Oblast.
- The governor oversees the executive branch, and appoints the cabinet members. The governor also appoints the members of a wide array of state boards and commissions.
- The governor is the commander-in-chief of the Nizhny Novgorod Oblast National Guard.
- The governor may grant pardons to those convicted of criminal offenses under Oblast law.
- The governor fills vacancies that occur in the state legislature, the state judiciary, and other state constitutional offices.
- The governor is the titular head of their political party.

== List of governors ==
No.	Portrait	Name	Period	Time in office	Party	Election
1		Boris Nemtsov (1959–2015)	30 November 1991 – 17 March 1997 (resigned)	5 years, 107 days	Independent	Appointed 1995
—		Yury Lebedev (born 1951)	17 March 1997 – 22 July 1997 (did not run)	127 days	Independent	Acting
2		Ivan Sklyarov (1948–2007)	22 July 1997 – 8 August 2001 (lost re-election)	4 years, 17 days	Independent	1997
3		Gennady Khodyrev (born 1942)	8 August 2001 – 8 August 2005 (was not renominated)	4 years, 0 days	Communist Party → Independent	2001
4		Valery Shantsev (born 1947)	8 August 2005 – 30 May 2014 (resigned)	12 years, 49 days	United Russia	2005 (Note: Appointed by the president of Russia with the consent of the Legislative Assembly); 2010
—		Valery Shantsev (born 1947)	30 May 2014 – 24 September 2014	12 years, 49 days	United Russia	Acting
(4)		Valery Shantsev (born 1947)	24 September 2014 – 26 September 2017 (resigned)	12 years, 49 days	United Russia	2014
—		Gleb Nikitin (born 1977)	26 September 2017 – 26 September 2018	9 years, 54 days	United Russia	Acting
5		Gleb Nikitin (born 1977)	26 September 2018 – present	9 years, 54 days	United Russia	2018; 2023
