= Valery Shantsev =

Russian politician (born 1947)

- Валерий Шанцев
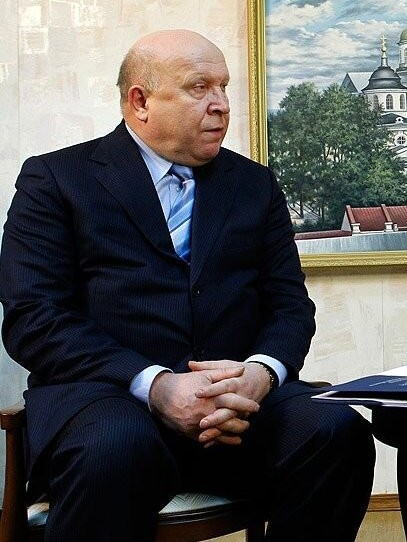

4th Governor of Nizhny Novgorod Oblast
- In office 8 August 2005 – 26 September 2017
- Preceded by: Gennady Khodyrev
- Succeeded by: Gleb Nikitin

Personal details
- Born: 22 March 1947 (age 79) Susanino, Kostroma Oblast
- Party: United Russia
- Profession: Farmer, then Coach

Valery Pavlinovich Shantsev (Russian: Валерий Павлинович Шанцев; born 29 June 1947) is the former governor of Nizhny Novgorod Oblast from 8 August 2005, when he replaced Gennady Khodyrev until his resignation on 26 September 2017. Prior to his appointment as governor, Shantsev was the deputy mayor of Moscow. He also led Moscow's bid for the 2012 Summer Olympics.

== Personal life ==
Shantsev was born in 1947, and was a factory worker. Valery Shantsev was born on 29 June 1947 in the village of Susanino, Kostroma Region. Up to 7 years he was brought up in the village with his grandmother, afterwards he moved to Moscow to his parents. He graduated from the 8th form of school No. 743, after which he entered the aviation technical school. Later he graduated from the evening department of the Moscow Institute of Radio Engineering, Electronics and Automation and the Academy of National Economy.

In 1968 Shantsev got a job at the Salyut defense plant. At the Salyut factory, Shantsev first worked as an assistant to the master, then as the head of the workshop preparation department, as a senior engineer-technologist. He was the secretary of the Komsomol organization of the plant.

In 1971 he joined the CPSU, from 1975 to 1991 he worked in party positions. He was deputy secretary of the party committee of the Salyut plant, instructor, deputy head of the industrial and transport department of the Perovski district committee of the CPSU, instructor, deputy head of the machine building department of the Moscow City Committee of the CPSU.

In 1983, Shantsev became a deputy of the Perovskiy District Soviet of People's Deputies. In 1985-1990, Shantsev was chairman of the Perovsk regional executive committee, first secretary of the Perovski district committee of the CPSU, chairman of the Perovsk regional council of people's deputies. In 1987, Shantsev was first elected to the Moscow City Council, in 1990 he was reelected.

In 1990, Shantsev became secretary of the Moscow City Counsel. In the same year he was re-elected to the Moscow City Council; there he created and headed the opposition communist faction "Moscow", which existed until the dissolution of the Moscow Soviet in October 1993. In May 1991, Shantsev demanded the resignation of the chairman of the Moscow City Council, Gabriel Popov, for the disorganization of the work of the Moscow City Council and the use of his rostrum for agitation (Popov was at that time a candidate for the post of mayor of Moscow.) Shantsev himself also ran for the mayor elections in Moscow in the summer of 1991, however, elected Popov (paired with whom the candidate for the post of vice-mayor was Luzhkov).

Since August 1991 - commercial director of the hockey club "Dynamo", at the same time the first deputy chairman of the Executive Committee of the Moscow organization of the Communist Party.

In 1994 he was appointed a member of the Moscow Government, prefect of the Southern Administrative District of Moscow. 16 June 1996 was elected vice-mayor of Moscow, in July 1996 was appointed First Deputy Prime Minister of the Government of Moscow. During this election campaign, Shantsev was assassinated. As a result, he received 148 shrapnel wounds and more than 50% of the body was burned.

In December 1999, he was again elected vice-mayor of Moscow, until December 2003 he was the head of the Complex for Economic Policy and Development of Moscow. In December 2003, after Yu. M. Luzhkov was elected Mayor of Moscow, VP Shantsev was appointed vice-mayor of Moscow, head of the complex of development of the scientific and industrial potential of Moscow, interregional and public relations. In the years 1994-2006. - President of the Moscow Hockey Federation.

8 August 2005 Legislative Assembly of the Nizhny Novgorod region on the proposal of the President of Russia was endowed with the powers of the Governor of the Nizhny Novgorod region. 8 August 2010 Legislative Assembly of the Nizhny Novgorod region on the proposal of the president of Russia was re-entrusted with the powers of the governor of the Nizhny Novgorod region. 30 May 2014, Russian president Vladimir Putin accepted Shantsev's resignation so that on 14 September 2014 Valery Pavlinovich took part in direct elections of the governor of the Nizhny Novgorod region.

14 September 2014 won in the early elections of the governor of the Nizhny Novgorod region. On 24 September 2014, he assumed the post of governor of the Nizhny Novgorod region.

26 September 2017 prematurely left the post of Governor of the Nizhny Novgorod region at his own request. The decree on his resignation was signed by Russian president Vladimir Putin.

9 January 2018 was elected to the board of directors of PJSC "Transneft" . In early February 2018 he was appointed deputy general director of JSC Concern Morinformsystem-Agat for development.

On 2 February 2018, the press office of the hockey club Dynamo announced that Shantsev had become a member of the board of directors of the club. 11 April 2018 was appointed general director of the hockey club "Dynamo".

From 2021 has become a member of the board of directors of the AERPMAX company Руководство ООО АЭРОМАКС (АФК СИСТЕМА)
