= Gennady Khodyrev =

Soviet and Russian statesman

- Геннадий Ходырев
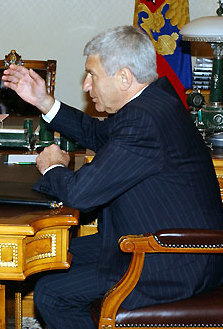
- Khodyrev in 2004

Governor of Nizhny Novgorod Oblast
- In office 8 August 2001 – 8 August 2005
- Preceded by: Ivan Sklyarov
- Succeeded by: Valery Shantsev

Minister for Antimonopoly Policy and Entrepreneurship Support
- In office 28 October 1998 – 12 May 1999
- Prime Minister: Yevgeny Primakov
- Preceded by: Office established
- Succeeded by: Ilya Yuzhanov

Personal details
- Born: 23 September 1942 (age 83) Temirgoyevskaya, Kurganinsky District, Krasnodar Krai, Russian SFSR, Soviet Union
- Party: United Russia
- Other political affiliations: CPSU (before 1991), CPRF (1995–2002)
- Awards: Several others (see below)

Gennady Maksimovich Khodyrev (Russian: Геннадий Максимович Ходырев; born 23 September 1942) is a Soviet and Russian statesman, former Governor of Nizhny Novgorod Oblast and the Minister for Antimonopoly Policy.

== Biography ==
Khodyrev was born on 23 September 1942 in the village of Temigorevskaya, Krasnodar Krai, into the family of a collective farmer. He graduated from the Leningrad Mechanical Institute with the specialty "Mechanical Engineer" in 1966, Academy of Social Sciences under the CPSU Central Committee.

=== Work experience ===
Khodyrev began his work life in 1958 as a turner at the Kurganinsk sugar factory. From 1966 to 1970 - engineer-technologist, senior engineer-technologist, site manager, the released secretary of the Komsomol Committee Gorky Machine-Building Plant. From 1970 to 1974 he was the first secretary of the Moscow district committee of the Gorky Komsomol. From 1974 to 1981 he was the head of the assembly shop, then deputy secretary, secretary of the party committee of the Gorky Machine Building Plant.

=== Political activity ===
==== USSR ====
Since 1981 Khodyrev was involved in party work in the city of Gorky. From 1983 to 1987 he worked as an instructor, deputy head of the Organizational-Party Work Department of the CPSU Central Committee. From 1987 to 1988 - the second, from June 1988 to November 1991 - the first secretary of the Gorky Regional Committee of the CPSU, simultaneously from April 1990 and until August 1991 - chairman of the Gorky Regional Council people's deputies.

Khodyrev was elected deputy of the Gorky (Nizhny Novgorod) Regional Council (1990-1994), People's Deputy of the USSR (1989-1991). After the failure of the State Emergency Committee, he left the posts of the first secretary of the regional committee and chairman of the Gorky Regional Council.

==== Russia ====
Since 1991 Khodyrev was the head of the Nizhny Novgorod branch of "MIR" JSC "Soyuz". From 1994 to 1995 he was President of the Chamber of Commerce and Industry of Nizhny Novgorod Oblast. From 1995 to 1998 he was a deputy of the 2nd State Duma as a member of the Communist Party of the Russian Federation faction, and sat as a member of the Duma's Committee on Economic Policy. He resigned as deputy in 1998 in connection with the transition to the government. In July 1997 he ran for gubernatorial elections in the Nizhny Novgorod Oblast, but lost to the former mayor of Nizhny Novgorod Ivan Sklyarov.

From October 1998 to May 1999 Khodyrev was Minister of the Russian Federation for Antimonopoly Policy and Support of Entrepreneurship in Yevgeny Primakov's Cabinet, and resigned after the dissolution of the government. Until the end of 1999 he worked as President of the Chamber of Commerce and Industry of the Nizhny Novgorod Oblast. In December 1999, he was elected a deputy of the 3rd State Duma for the Dzerzhinsky single-mandate electoral district No. 119 of Nizhny Novgorod Oblast, nominated directly by voters. He was again a member of the faction, and was a member of the Committee on Industry, Construction and High Technologies.

In 2001, Khodyrev again ran as a candidate for the post of governor of Nizhny Novgorod Oblast, in the first round of elections he took the first place among the five candidates (24.44% of votes) on 15 July, in the second round on 29 July, gaining 59% of the vote, over the former governor Ivan Sklyarov (27% of the vote) with a 35% voter turnout. In August 2001, he also became chairman of the government of the Nizhny Novgorod Oblast (according to press reports for a "transitional period" of one year). On 28 May 2002, he officially announced his withdrawal from the Communist Party of the Russian Federation in protest against the expulsion from the party of the Speaker of the State Duma Gennady Seleznyov, as well as deputies Nikolai Gubenko and Svetlana Goryacheva.

During his time in office Khodyrev was unable to improve the socio-economic situation of the region. In April and June 2005, deputies of the regional Legislative Assembly called on him to resign ahead of schedule and said that they would not approve him for a second term if he was nominated, even under threat of dissolution. On 8 August 2005, the former deputy mayor of Moscow Valery Shantsev was unanimously confirmed as the new governor of the Nizhny Novgorod region by the President of the Russian Federation Vladimir Putin.

== Honours and awards ==
- Order of the Red Banner of Labor
- Honorary Diploma of the Government of the Russian Federation (6 July 1999)

== Family ==
Khodyrev is married and has three children. His wife, Gulya Khodyreva, was suspected of organizing an illegal additional issue of shares in Novomirsky GOK. Khodyreva was acquitted of all charges, the local Road Fund officers were convicted.
