= Vladimir Blotsky =

Russian politician (born 1977)

- Владимир Блоцкий
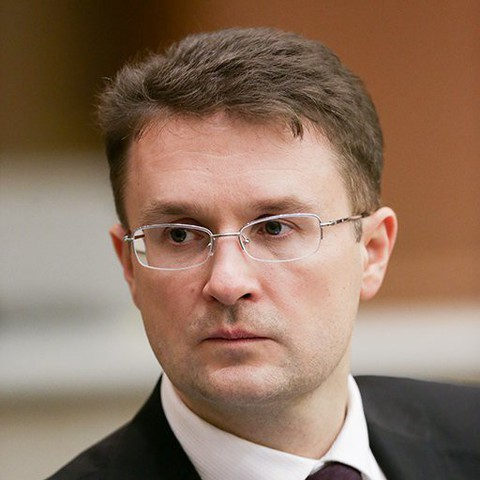

Member of the State Duma (Party List Seat)
- In office 5 October 2016 – 4 December 2023
- Succeeded by: Vladislav Yegorov

Personal details
- Born: 10 November 1977 (age 48) Klin, Klinsky District, Moscow Oblast, RSFSR, USSR
- Party: Communist
- Education: Kutafin Moscow State Law University

Vladimir Blotsky (Russian: Владимир Николаевич Блоцкий; born 10 November 1977, Klin, Klinsky District, Moscow Oblast) is a Russian political figure and a deputy of the 7th and 8th State Dumas.

In 2001, Blotsky started working as a legal adviser at the legal company "Sovremennoye pravo". In 2005, he headed the legal department of the Management company "Flotoceanprodukt" LLC. Later he worked as the General Director of the management companies Murmansk Trawl Fleet PJSC " and Murmansk Provincial Fleet JSC. In 2016, he became the deputy of the 7th State Duma from the Nizhny Novgorod Oblast. In September 2021, he was re-elected to serve as deputy of the 8th State Duma. On 29 November 2023 he announced his intention to resign from the Duma, which was officially accepted on 4 December.

In 2021, Blotsky took 46th place in the Forbes ranking of the wealthiest civil servants in Russia.

== Sanctions ==
He was sanctioned by the UK government in 2022 in relation to the Russo-Ukrainian War.
