= Hvidøre =

Country house in Copenhagen, Denmark

Coordinates: 55°46′17.7″N 12°35′39.9″E

Hvidøre House
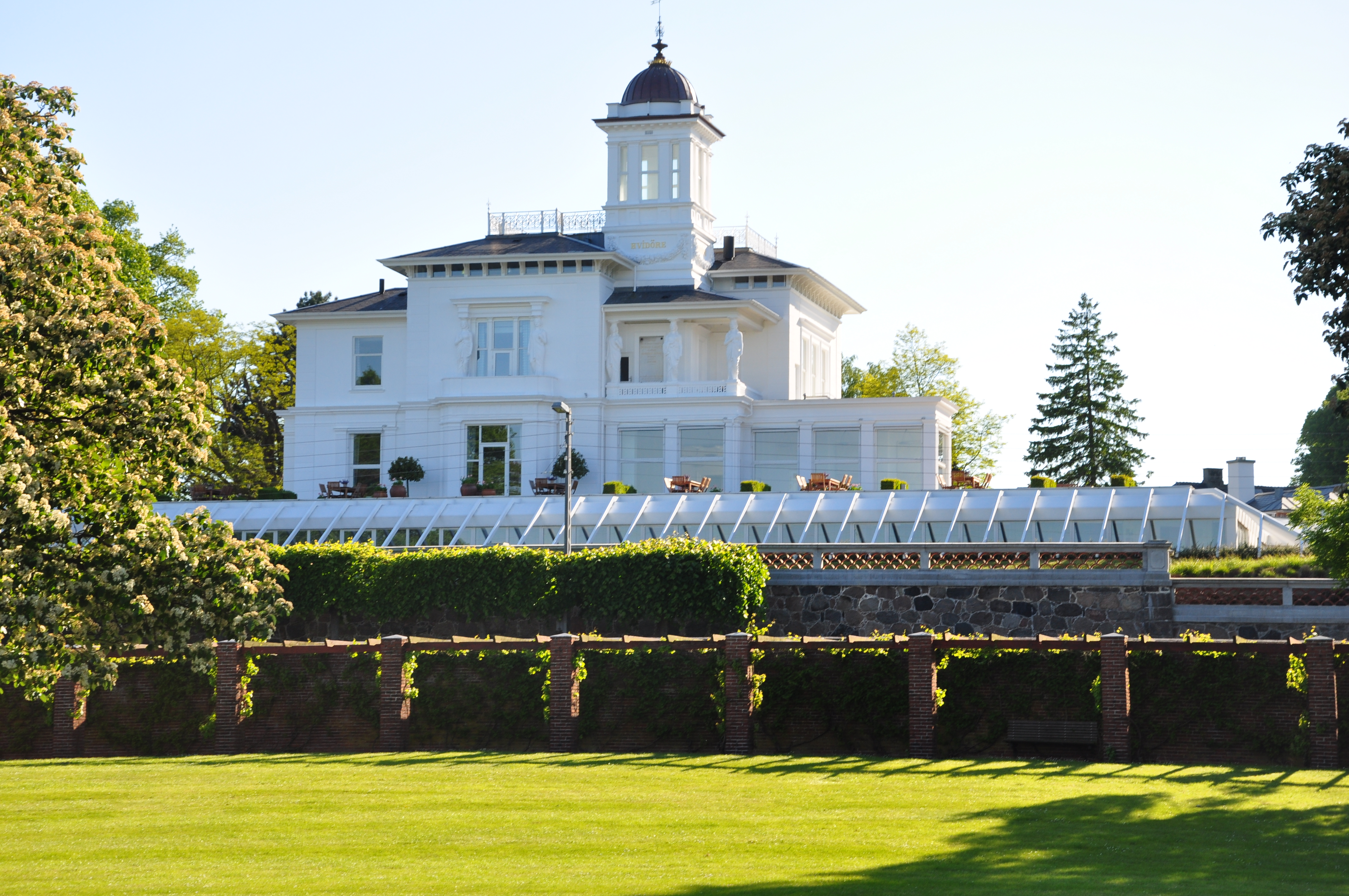
- Hvidøre
- Interactive map of the Hvidøre House area

General information
- Architectural style: Historicism
- Location: Klampenborg, Copenhagen, Denmark
- Construction started: 1871
- Completed: 1892
- Client: Frederik Christian Bruun
- Owner: Novo Nordisk

Design and construction
- Architect: Johan Schrøder

Hvidøre House (Danish: Hvidøre) is a former country house at Klampenborg, just south of Bellevue Beach, on the Øresund coast north of Copenhagen, Denmark. It is most known for serving as the home of Dowager Empress Maria Feodorovna of Russia, daughter of King Christian IX of Denmark and mother of the last emperor of Russia, Nicholas II, after she was exiled by the Russian Revolution of 1917. It now serves as a conference and training venue for the Novo Group.

== History ==
=== Origins ===
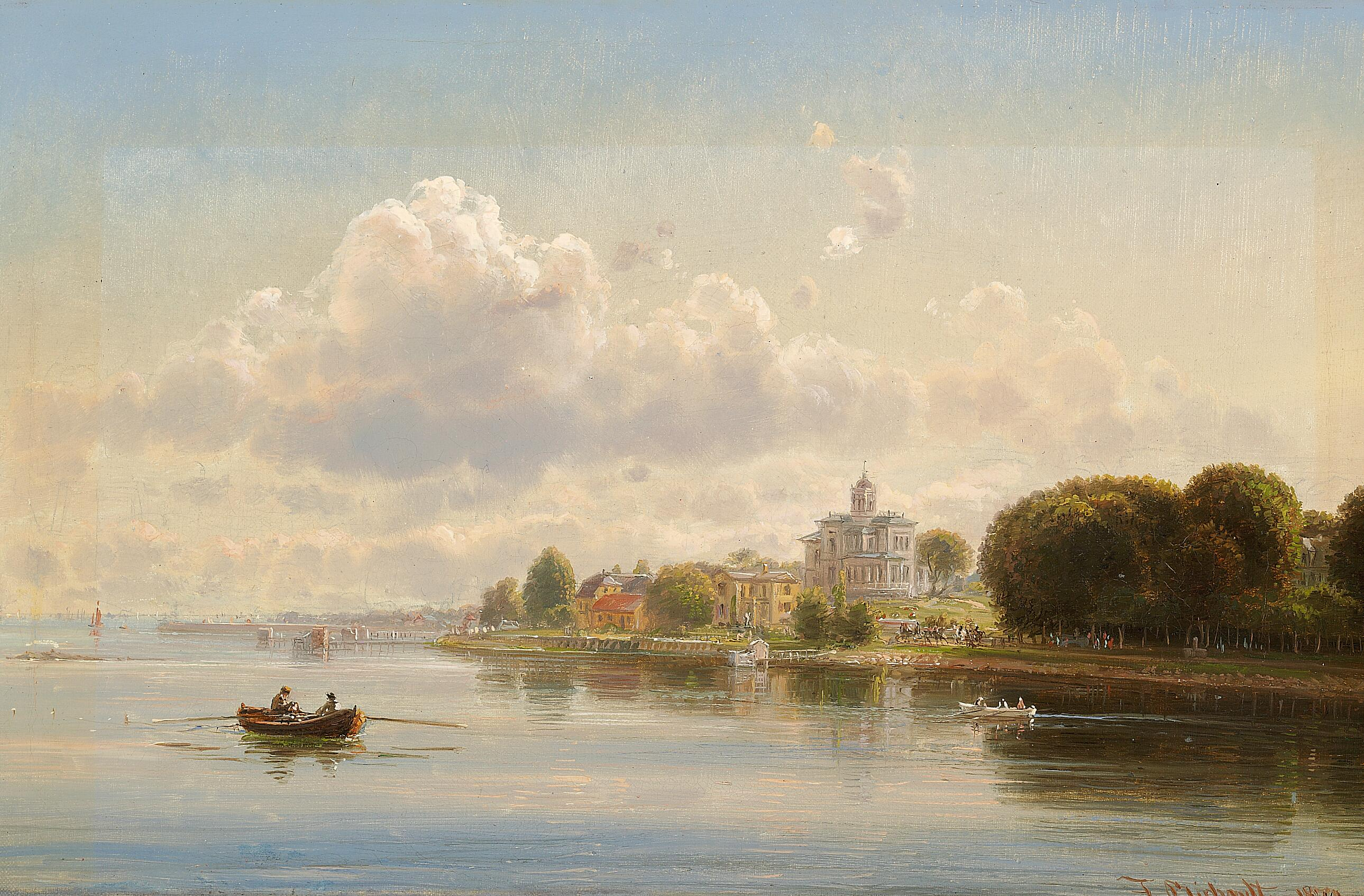
A Summer's Day at Hvidøre, painting by Ferdinand Richardt

At the beginning of the 16th century, King John of Denmark built a royal residence at Hvidøre, guarding the only landing place to the north of Copenhagen. King Christian II used it for his mistress and her mother after his marriage to Princess Elisabeth of Habsburg in 1515.

=== Bruun and the new building ===
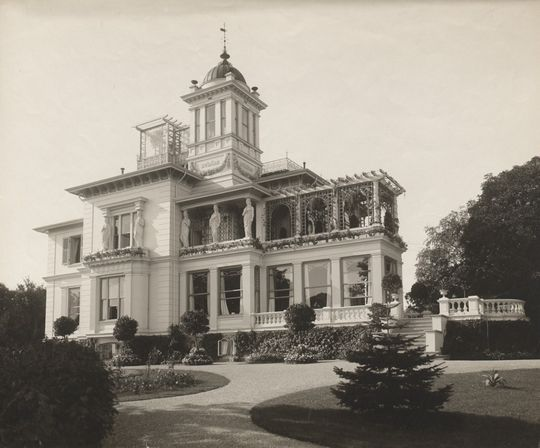
Hvidøre, the facade towards Øresund

Hvidøre was eventually acquired by Counsellor Frederik Bruun in 1871. He demolished it and charged the architect Johan Schrøder with the design of a country house to be built in its place, for use as a summer residence for his family. From then on, the name Hvidøre denoted the house rather than the locality. Hvidøre was built from 1871. Counsellor Bruun died in 1887, but his widow kept Hvidøre until 1906.

=== Royal residents ===
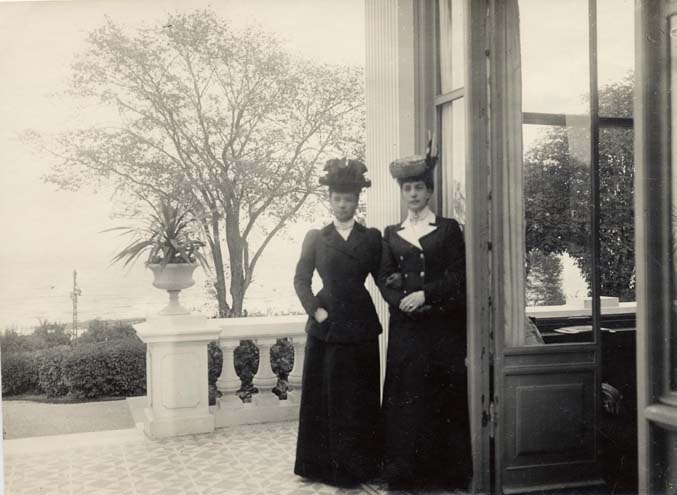
Alexandra and Maria Feodorovna at Hvidøre, c. 1910

In February 1906, King Christian IX's daughters, Queen Alexandra of the United Kingdom and Dowager Empress Maria Feodorovna of Russia, acquired the building for DKK 280,000 to use it as a summer residence during their frequent visits to their native Denmark. They commissioned an aging Johan Schrøder to adapt and modernize the house with modern conveniences such as central heating while the British firm Waring & Gillow was put in charge of most of the interior decorations. A tunnel was also dug to provide direct access to the beach, which belonged to Hvidøre but was separated from it by the coastal road.

In the years that followed, the sisters generally stayed at Hvidøre from September until November, but this came to an end with the outbreak of World War I in 1914.

After the overthrow of the monarchy in Russia in the 1917 Revolution, Maria Feodorovna, known as Princess Dagmar of Denmark before her marriage, fled Russia and took up residency at Hvidøre until her death in 1928, together with her daughter and son-in-law, Grand Duchess Olga Alexandrovna and Nikolai Kulikovsky, and their two children.

In 1930 Olga and her sister Xenia sold Hvidøre.

=== Later history ===
In 1932, Musse Scheel, the daughter of Frederik Christian Bruun who had married Count Ulrik Scheel, acquired her childhood home, reputedly to prevent the felling of an old tree in the gardens. She only lived in the house for two years before moving to the mansion at 5 Kristianiagade now the Embassy of Russia in Copenhagen.

In 1937 the Hvidøre estate was acquired by Novo Industry. Thorvald Pedersen, the founder and managing director of the company, commissioned Arne Jacobsen to build him a private home close by and considered tearing down the old house, but in the end Jacobsen was asked to adapt it into a diabetes sanatorium which opened on 28 January 1938. People with diabetes could get treatment and learn to live with their disease and have an active life. The hospital accommodated 25 patients.

An underground extension of the building, designed by the architectural firm Dissing + Weitling, was constructed 1978-1980. Hvidøre continued to serve as a diabetes hospital until 1991 and is now an internal conference center for the Novo Group.

== Architecture and surroundings ==
Hvidøre is built to a Historicist design which combines Italian and Victorian Renaissance features. Five Neo-Grecian caryatids form part of the upper balcony. They were created by the sculptor Otto Evens.

On the coast below the house there is a beach park designed by the landscape architect Carl Theodor Sørensen while the architect Povl Baumann designed the wall and pergola. Also located close by is the Emiliekilde monument.

== Hvidøre today ==
Today the Hvidøre property serves as an internal conference and training centre for the Novo Group.

== See also ==
- Alexander Nevsky Church, Copenhagen
