= Dmitry Krasnov =

Russian politician (born 1959)

- Дмитрий Краснов
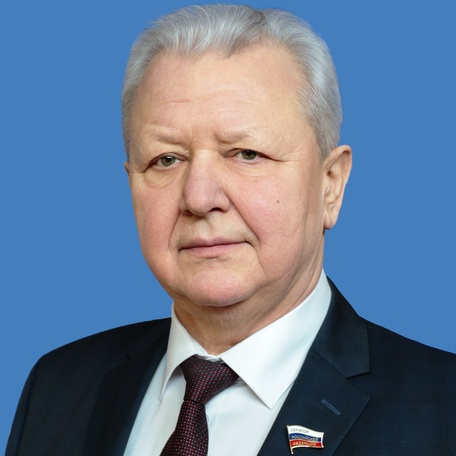

Senator from Arkhangelsk Oblast
- Incumbent
- Assumed office 26 February 2026
- Preceded by: Alexander Vainberg

Personal details
- Born: 12 August 1959 (age 67) Staraya Ushitsa, Ukrainian SSR, Soviet Union
- Party: United Russia
- Education: Moscow Pedagogical Institute
- Awards: Order of Honour; Order of Friendship

Dmitry Germanovich Krasnov (Russian: Дмитрий Германович Краснов; born August 12, 1959, Staraya Ushitsa, Khmelnytsky Oblast, Ukrainian SSR) is a Russian politician, representative of the Legislative Assembly of Nizhny Novgorod Oblast in the Federation Council since February 26, 2026. He is a member of United Russia party.

== Biography ==
He was born in Stara Ushytsia, Ukrainian SSR. In 1985, he graduated from the Moscow Pedagogical Institute as a teacher of the history of state and law. In 2005, he graduated from the Nizhny Novgorod Law Academy as a lawyer. He holds a PhD in Law and is an associate professor.

From 2007 to 2011 he served as Deputy Chairman of the Public Chamber of the Nizhny Novgorod Oblast.

From 2011 to 2015 he served as Deputy and Deputy Chairman of the Committee on Economy, Industry, and Entrepreneurship Support of the Legislative Assembly of the Nizhny Novgorod Oblast of the 5th convocation.

From 2015 to 2018 he served as Deputy and Deputy Chairman of the City Duma of Nizhny Novgorod of the 6th convocation.

From 2021 to 2026 he had been a Deputy and Deputy Chairman of the Legislative Assembly of Nizhny Novgorod Oblast of the 7th convocation.

Since February 26, 2026 he is a senator, representative of the Legislative Assembly of the Nizhny Novgorod Oblast in the Federation Council of the Russian Federation.
