= Vladislav Yegorov =

Russian politician

Vladislav Yegorov MP
- Владислав Егоров
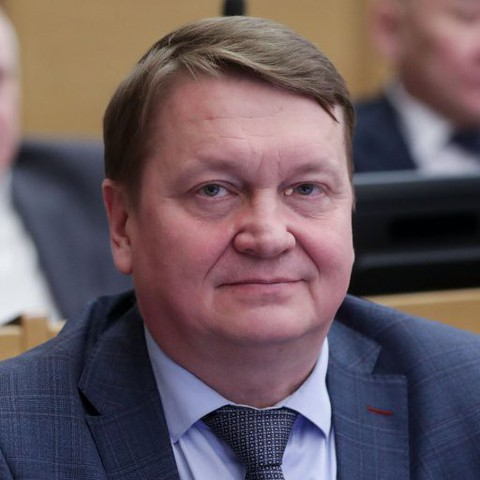

Member of the State Duma (Party List Seat)
- Incumbent
- Assumed office 20 December 2023
- Preceded by: Vladimir Blotsky

Member of the Legislative Assembly of Nizhny Novgorod Oblast
- In office 2006 – 13 December 2023

Personal details
- Born: 8 September 1969 (age 55); Pavlovo, Gorky Oblast, RSFSR, USSR
- Political party: Communist
- Children: 2
- Education: Nizhny Novgorod State University (DPhil)
- Occupation: Lecturer; Politician

Vladislav Ivanovich Yegorov (Note: Also transliterated as Egorov) (Russian: Владислав Иванович Егоров; born on 8 September 1969), is a Russian politician who has sat as a member of the State Duma of the eighth convocation from the Communist Party of the Russian Federation since 13 December 2023. He is the First Secretary of the Nizhny Novgorod Regional Committee of the Communist Party of the Russian Federation.

== Biography ==
Vladislav Yegorov was born in Pavlovo-on-Oke in what is now Nizhny Novgorod Oblast, on 8 September 1969.

In 1992, he graduated with honors from the Faculty of History of N. I. Lobachevsky State University of Nizhny Novgorod, awarded the academic degree of Candidate of Philosophical Sciences in 1996.

In 1995, he began his career at Nizhny Novgorod State University as an assistant at the Department of Social Philosophy, and worked at the Faculty of Law, History, Philology, and the Faculty of International Relations.

Currently, he is a senior lecturer at the Department of Electronic Media at UNN.

In 1996, he began his career at Nizhny Novgorod State University. N.I. Lobachevsky from the position of assistant at the department of social philosophy. Since 2001, for 14 years, he worked part-time as a senior lecturer at the faculties of law, history, philology, and the faculty of international relations of Nizhny Novgorod State University. N.I. Lobachevsky.

From 2001 to 2003, he had been an assistant to a deputy of the State Duma of the Federal Assembly. From 2003 to 2005 he worked in socio-political organizations.

=== Legislative Assembly of Nizhny Novgorod Oblast ===
In 2006, he was elected as a member of the Legislative Assembly of Nizhny Novgorod Oblast's 4th convocation, and served as deputy chairman of the committee on rules and parliamentary ethics.

In December 2007, he has headed the Communist Party faction in the Legislative Assembly of Nizhny Novgorod Oblast.

In 2011, he was elected as a deputy of the 5th convocation and Deputy Chairman of the Legislative Assembly of Nizhny Novgorod Oblast.

== Member of the State Duma ==
On 13 December 2023, the Central Election Commission, transferred the mandate of Vladimir Blotsky, who had prematurely terminated his parliamentary powers, to the first secretary of the Nizhny Novgorod regional branch of the party, Yegorov. He assumed office as a deputy on 20 December 2023.

“The vacant mandate of a deputy of the State Duma of the eighth convocation was transferred to Vladislav Egorov (Communist Party of the Russian Federation) in connection with the early termination of the powers of Vladimir Blotsky,” the message says.

He is a member and vice-chairman of the Duma committee on agrarian issues.

== Family ==
He is married and has two daughters.
