= Karaul =

Karaul (Kazakh: Қарауыл) is the name of selo in Kazakhstan:

- Karaul, Abay District, East Kazakhstan, a selo in Abay District of East Kazakhstan

Karaul (Russian: Карау́л) is the name of several rural localities in Russia:

- Karaul, Bogorodsky District, Kirov Oblast, a village in Ukhtymsky Rural Okrug of Bogorodsky District of Kirov Oblast
- Karaul, Kotelnichsky District, Kirov Oblast, a village in Kotelnichsky Rural Okrug of Kotelnichsky District of Kirov Oblast
- Karaul, Kumyonsky District, Kirov Oblast, a village in Bereznikovsky Rural Okrug of Kumyonsky District of Kirov Oblast
- Karaul, Taymyrsky Dolgano-Nenetsky District, Krasnoyarsk Krai, a selo in Taymyrsky Dolgano-Nenetsky District of Krasnoyarsk Krai
- Karaul, Bardymsky District, Perm Krai, a selo in Bardymsky District of Perm Krai
- Karaul, Inzhavinsky District, Tambov Oblast, a selo in Karaulsky Selsoviet of Inzhavinsky District of Tambov Oblast
