= Susanino =

Susanino (Russian: Сусанино) is the name of several inhabited localities in Russia.

==== Urban localities ====
- Susanino, Kostroma Oblast, an urban-type settlement in Susaninsky District of Kostroma Oblast

==== Rural localities ====
- Susanino, Khabarovsk Krai, a village in Ulchsky District of Khabarovsk Krai
- Susanino, Leningrad Oblast, a logging depot settlement in Susaninskoye Settlement Municipal Formation of Gatchinsky District of Leningrad Oblast

== See also ==
- Susanino (ship), ship
