= Yevstratovka =

Yevstratovka Евстратовка
- Selo
- Location within Voronezh Oblast Location within Russia
- Coordinates: 50°07′N 39°44′E
- Country: Russia
- Region: Voronezh Oblast
- District: Rossoshansky District
- Time zone: UTC+3:00

Yevstratovka (Russian: Евстратовка) is a rural locality (a selo) and the administrative center of Yevstratovskoye Rural Settlement, Rossoshansky District, Voronezh Oblast, Russia. The population was 1,225 as of 2010. There are 12 streets.

== Geography ==
Yevstratovka is located 15 km southeast of Rossosh (the district's administrative centre) by road. Malaya Mezhenka is the nearest rural locality.
