= Gleb Nikitin =

Russian politician and statesman (born 1977)

- Глеб Никитин
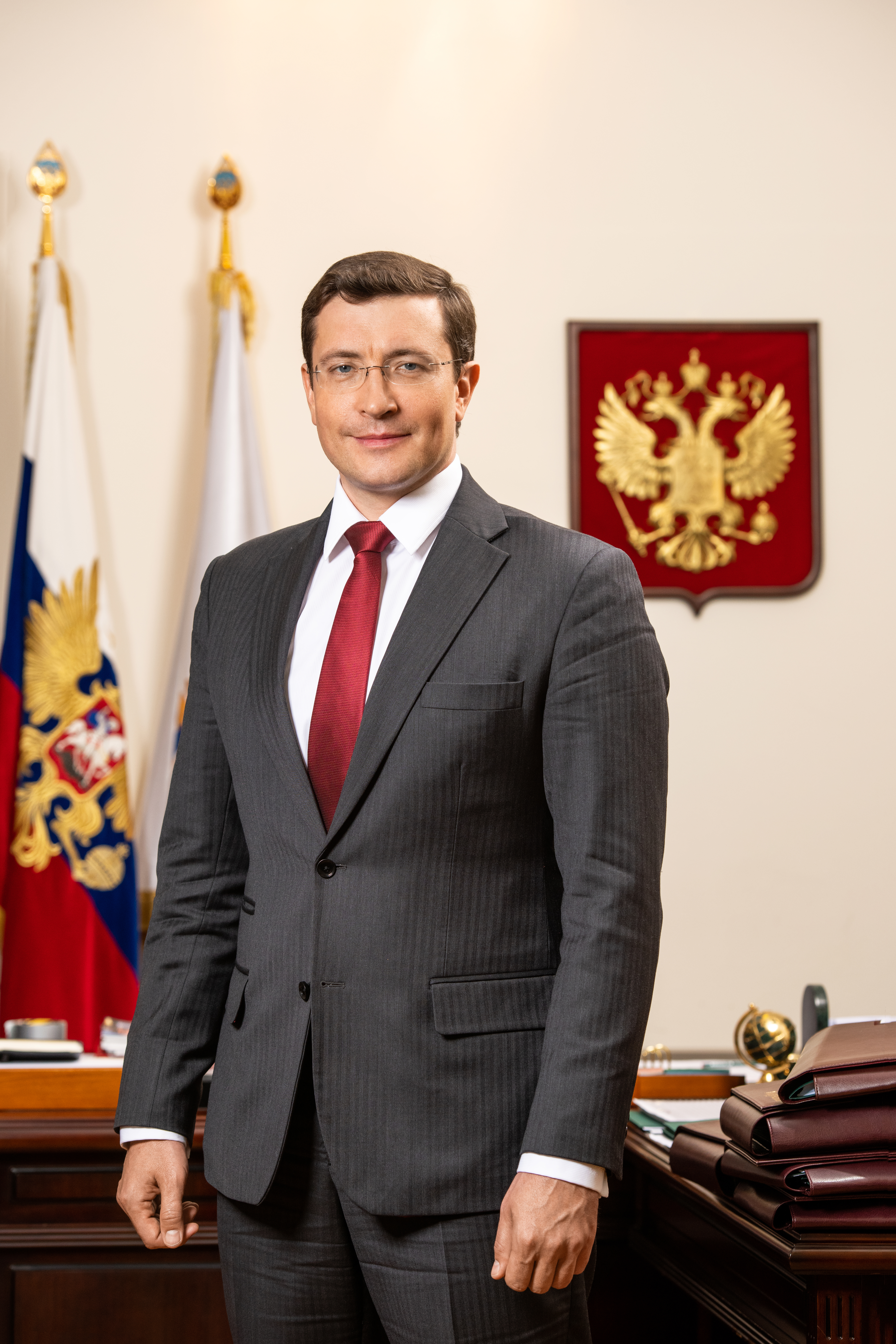
- Official portrait, 2022

5th Governor of Nizhny Novgorod Oblast
- Incumbent
- Assumed office 26 September 2018 (Acting since 26 September 2017)
- President: Vladimir Putin
- Preceded by: Valery Shantsev

Personal details
- Born: Gleb Sergeyevich Nikitin; 24 August 1977 (age 49) Leningrad, Soviet Union
- Citizenship: Russian
- Party: United Russia
- Education: SPbGEU; SPBU; FinU

Gleb Sergeyevich Nikitin (Russian: Глеб Сергеевич Никитин; born August 24, 1977) is a Russian politician and statesman. He has the federal state civilian service rank of 1st class Active State Councillor of the Russian Federation. He has been the governor of Nizhny Novgorod region since 26 September 2018.

== Early life ==
Nikitin was born on August 24, 1977, in Leningrad, Russian SFSR, Soviet Union.

== Education ==
In 1999, Nikitin graduated from the Saint Petersburg State University of Economics and Finance with a degree in Finance and Credit. In 2004, he graduated from Saint Petersburg State University's faculty of law, with a major in Jurisprudence. In 2007, he defended his thesis at the Financial University under the Government of the Russian Federation, where he was a Candidate of Economic Sciences. In 2008, he graduated from the Russian Presidential Academy of National Economy and Public Administration.

In February 2012, he graduated with honors from an MBA program. In 2016, he was certified by the Russian Project Management Association SOVNET, as a Certified Project Director of IPMA Level A.

== Career ==
=== Saint Petersburg Committee for City Property Management ===
From 1999 to 2004, Nikitin worked in the Committee for City Property Management of St. Petersburg. He held the posts of leading specialist, head of department, and head of the office of the disposal of state property. At these posts, he oversaw the management of organizations with state participation, corporate governance, and privatization, and conducted an analysis of financial and economic activities of enterprises.

=== Federal Agency for State Property Management ===
From 2004 to 2012, Nikitin worked in the Federal Agency for State Property Management as the head of the Property Department of commercial sector organizations, as deputy head of the agency, and, from December 2011 to June 2012, as its head. During his time in the agency he implemented a number of major projects. As a member of the board of directors, he represented the interests of the state in such major Russian companies as Rosneft, Transneft, RAO UES, OJSC Aeroflot, OJSC НПК, Uralvagonzavod, OJSC Concern VKO, Almaz-Antey, Energia, OJSC Sovcomflot, and OJSC Alrosa.

He represented the interests of the Russian Federation as a shareholder of enterprises. He provided for the development and implementation of an inter-agency portal for the interaction of state bodies, enterprises, and members of the management bodies of joint-stock companies. He took an active part in the implementation of the reform of management systems of organizations with public participation and the development and implementation of new tools and institutions in the field of corporate governance.

He actively participated in the largest public offerings of shares of Russian companies, including the IPO of Rosneft in 2006 and the privatization of VTB Bank in 2011. He supported projects to create vertically integrated structures for companies with state participation, the formation of United Shipbuilding Corporation and United Aircraft Building Corporation. In 2007-2012, he participated in the implementation of large mergers and acquisitions, including Transneft and Transnefteprodukt, Sovcomflot, and Novoship.

=== Ministry of Industry and Trade ===
In July 2012, Nikitin was appointed Deputy Minister of Industry and Trade of the Russian Federation, in June 2013, becoming the first deputy under Denis Manturov. He oversaw the planning, implementation, and budget support of state programs; state policy in the field of property relations, including the preparation of annual plans for the privatization of federal property of organizations; corporate policy in the ministry's sphere of activities; information systems for project management; and formed and implemented state policy in the sphere of property management. He also oversaw the regulation of foreign trade activity; participation of the Russian Federation in the World Trade Organization; coordinated the implementation of principles of the best available technologies; ensured the activities on the application of measures of non-tariff regulation; and coordinated deputy ministers on interactions with foreign countries and international economic, sectoral, and regional organizations.

Nikitin was a member of the collegium of the Military-Industrial Commission of the Russian Federation and was a representative of the Government of the Russian Federation in the Russian tripartite commission for the regulation of social and labor relations. In addition, he organized interactions with the supervisory board of the state corporation Rostek, and the Industrial Development Fund.

Along with this, Nikitin coordinated and gave instructions on issues of state policy in the sphere of development and use of information technologies in public administration. He also coordinated the introduction of information technologies to the Ministry such as technical regulation, standardization, metrology and ensuring the uniformity of measurements; preparation of technical regulations; formation of a system that confirmed the quality of Russian products; foreign economic relations regarding technical regulations and standards; ecology and environmental protection; and technology that monitored the labor and employment markets. Nikitin promoted the principles of Open Government within the Ministry of Industry and Trade. He took part in the development of the domestic composite industry and in the issue of import substitution in Russia. Under his initiative, methods of project management that enhance the efficiency of industrial enterprises were developed.

Nikitin was one of the proponents of the bills "On Industrial Policy" and "On Standardization in the Russian Federation", and represented them before the deputies of the State Duma. He participated in the development of the Industrial Development Fund and the necessary legal acts for the organization of its work. The industrial policy bill was adopted by the State Duma on December 16, 2014, and as early as December 31, 2014, Russian President Vladimir Putin signed the Federal Law "On Industrial Policy in the Russian Federation" No. 488-ФЗ.

=== Governor of Nizhny Novgorod Oblast ===
On September 26, 2017, by decree of the Russian president Nikitin was appointed as the acting governor of the Nizhny Novgorod region "before the appointment of a person elected by the governor of the Nizhny Novgorod region". In December 2017, he joined the political party United Russia.
