= Vladimir Lebedev (politician) =

Russian politician (1962–2023)

- Владимир Лебедев
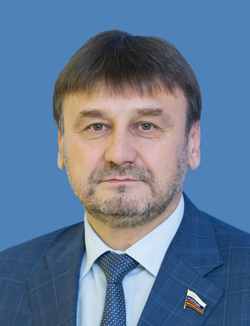

Senator from Nizhny Novgorod Oblast
- In office 25 September 2014 – 30 November 2023
- Preceded by: Valery Shnyakin

Personal details
- Born: Vladimir Lebedev; 23 April 1962 Novogrudok, Grodno Oblast, Byelorussian SSR, USSR
- Died: 30 November 2023 (aged 61)
- Party: United Russia
- Education: Nizhny Novgorod State Technical University

Vladimir Albertovich Lebedev (Russian: Владимир Альбертович Лебедев; 23 April 1962 – 30 November 2023) was a Russian politician who served as a senator from Nizhny Novgorod Oblast from 2014 to 2023.

== Life and career ==
Vladimir Lebedev was born on 23 April 1962 in Moscow. In 1988, he graduated from the Nizhny Novgorod State Technical University. After graduation, he worked at the Gorky Regional Committee of the Komsomol. From 1997 to 2004, he worked in various energy enterprises in management positions. From 2004 to 2005, Lebedev was First Deputy Chairman of the Government of the Kirov Oblast. On 25 September 2014, he became the senator from Nizhny Novgorod Oblast. He died on 30 November 2023, at the age of 61.

== Sanctions ==
Vladimir Lebedev was under personal sanctions introduced by the European Union, the United Kingdom, the United States, Canada, Switzerland, Australia, Ukraine and New Zealand for ratifying the decisions of the "Treaty of Friendship, Cooperation and Mutual Assistance between the Russian Federation and the Donetsk People's Republic and between the Russian Federation and the Luhansk People's Republic" and providing political and economic support for Russia's annexation of Ukrainian territories.
