= Legislative Assembly of Nizhny Novgorod Oblast =

Regional parliament of Nizhny Novgorod Oblast, Russia

Legislative Assembly of Nizhny Novgorod Oblast Законодательное Собрание Нижегородской области
- 7th legislature

Type
- Type: Unicameral

Leadership
- Chairman of the Assembly: Evgeniy Lyulin, United Russia since 29 October 2020

Structure
- Seats: 50
- Political groups: United Russia (40) CPRF (5); LDPR (2); SRZP (2) New People (1)

Elections
- Last election: 19 September 2021
- Next election: 2026

Meeting place
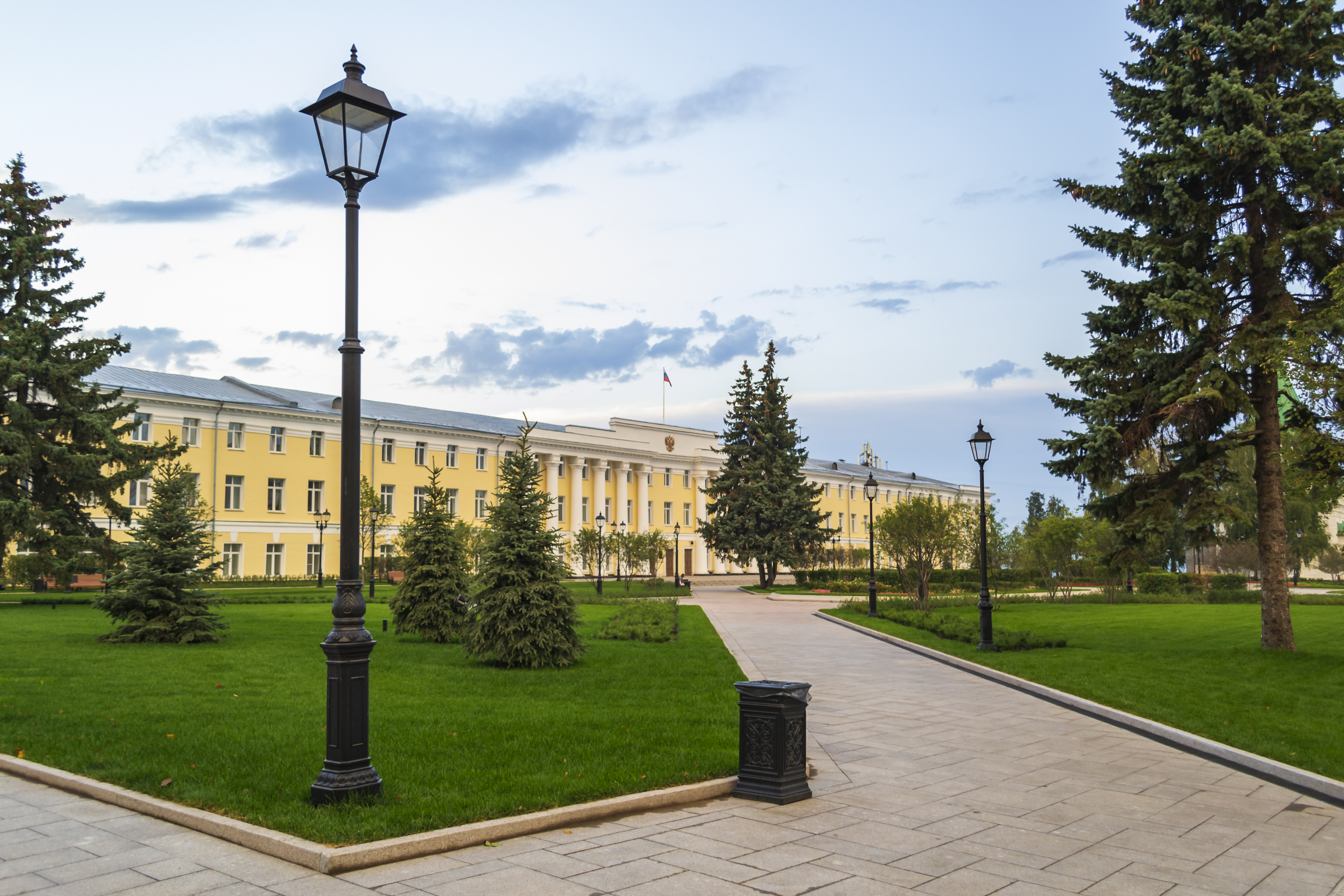
- Nizhny Novgorod Kremlin, Bldg. 2

Website
- zsno.ru

The Legislative Assembly of Nizhny Novgorod Oblast (Russian: Законодательное собрание Нижегородской области) is the regional parliament of Nizhny Novgorod Oblast, a federal subject of Russia. It is a unicameral body with a total of 50 representatives (deputies) elected for a 5-year term. 25 deputies are elected in single-seat electoral constituencies and 25 members are elected by a single (regional) constituency in proportion to the number of votes cast for the lists of candidates nominated by electoral associations. It acts on the basis of the Charter of Nizhny Novgorod Oblast.

== Elections ==
=== 2016 ===
| Party | % | Seats |
|---|---|---|
| United Russia | 43.15 | 41 |
| Communist Party of the Russian Federation | 13.36 | 4 |
| Liberal Democratic Party of Russia | 13.31 | 3 |
| A Just Russia | 6.95 | 2 |
| Registered voters/turnout | 43.95 | |

=== 2021 ===
| Party | % | Seats |
|---|---|---|
| United Russia | 49.01 | 40 |
| Communist Party of the Russian Federation | 19.18 | 5 |
| A Just Russia — For Truth | 9.55 | 2 |
| Liberal Democratic Party of Russia | 7.03 | 2 |
| New People | 5.53 | 1 |
| Registered voters/turnout | 47.62 | |

== List of chairmen ==
| Name | Took office | Left office |
|---|---|---|
| Anatoly Kazeradsky | 1994 | 2001 |
| Dmitry Ivanovich Bednyakov (acting) | 2001 | 2002 |
| Evgeniy Borisovich Lyulin | 2002 | 2007 |
| Viktor Nikolaevich Lunin | 2007 | 2011 |
| Evgeniy Viktorovich Lebedev | 2011 | 2020 |
| Evgeniy Borisovich Lyulin | 2020 | – |
