= Ivanovka, Russia =

Ivanovka (Russian: Ивановка) is the name of several rural localities in Russia.

== Modern localities ==
=== Altai Krai ===
As of 2012, seven rural localities in Altai Krai bear this name:

- Ivanovka, Charyshsky District, Altai Krai, a selo in Malobashchelaksky Selsoviet of Charyshsky District; 51°32′N 83°49′E
- Ivanovka, Kalmansky District, Altai Krai, a settlement in Shilovsky Selsoviet of Kalmansky District; 53°1′N 83°11′E
- Ivanovka, Krasnogorsky District, Altai Krai, a settlement in Krasnogorsky Selsoviet of Krasnogorsky District; 52°13′N 86°23′E
- Ivanovka, Kuryinsky District, Altai Krai, a selo in Ivanovsky Selsoviet of Kuryinsky District; 51°34′N 82°1′E
- Ivanovka, Shelabolikhinsky District, Altai Krai, a selo in Verkh-Kuchuksky Selsoviet of Shelabolikhinsky District; 53°23′N 82°11′E
- Ivanovka, Tretyakovsky District, Altai Krai, a settlement in Shipunikhinsky Selsoviet of Tretyakovsky District; 50°55′N 82°24′E
- Ivanovka, Yegoryevsky District, Altai Krai, a selo in Pervomaysky Selsoviet of Yegoryevsky District; 51°51′N 81°11′E

=== Amur Oblast ===
As of 2012, three rural localities in Amur Oblast bear this name:

- Ivanovka, Ivanovsky District, Amur Oblast, a selo in Ivanovsky Rural Settlement of Ivanovsky District
- Ivanovka, Zavitinsky District, Amur Oblast, a selo in Innokentyevsky Rural Settlement of Zavitinsky District
- Ivanovka, Zeysky District, Amur Oblast, a selo in Ivanovsky Rural Settlement of Zeysky District

=== Arkhangelsk Oblast ===
As of 2012, one rural locality in Arkhangelsk Oblast bears this name:

- Ivanovka, Arkhangelsk Oblast, a village in Lensky Selsoviet of Lensky District

=== Astrakhan Oblast ===
As of 2012, one rural locality in Astrakhan Oblast bears this name:

- Ivanovka, Astrakhan Oblast, a selo in Ivanovo-Nikolayevsky Selsoviet of Yenotayevsky District; 47°18′N 47°1′E

=== Republic of Bashkortostan ===
As of 2012, fourteen rural localities in the Republic of Bashkortostan bear this name:

- Ivanovka, Aurgazinsky District, Republic of Bashkortostan, a village in Batyrovsky Selsoviet of Aurgazinsky District
- Ivanovka, Bakalinsky District, Republic of Bashkortostan, a village in Novoursayevsky Selsoviet of Bakalinsky District
- Ivanovka, Bizhbulyaksky District, Republic of Bashkortostan, a village in Bizhbulyaksky Selsoviet of Bizhbulyaksky District
- Ivanovka, Davlekanovsky District, Republic of Bashkortostan, a selo in Ivanovsky Selsoviet of Davlekanovsky District
- Ivanovka, Fyodorovsky District, Republic of Bashkortostan, a village in Balyklinsky Selsoviet of Fyodorovsky District
- Ivanovka, Gafuriysky District, Republic of Bashkortostan, a village in Burlinsky Selsoviet of Gafuriysky District
- Ivanovka, Karmaskalinsky District, Republic of Bashkortostan, a village in Karlamansky Selsoviet of Karmaskalinsky District
- Ivanovka, Khaybullinsky District, Republic of Bashkortostan, a selo in Ivanovsky Selsoviet of Khaybullinsky District
- Ivanovka, Krasnokamsky District, Republic of Bashkortostan, a village in Arlanovsky Selsoviet of Krasnokamsky District
- Ivanovka, Kuyurgazinsky District, Republic of Bashkortostan, a village in Shabagishsky Selsoviet of Kuyurgazinsky District
- Ivanovka, Meleuzovsky District, Republic of Bashkortostan, a village in Partizansky Selsoviet of Meleuzovsky District
- Ivanovka, Sterlibashevsky District, Republic of Bashkortostan, a village in Aydaralinsky Selsoviet of Sterlibashevsky District
- Ivanovka, Tatyshlinsky District, Republic of Bashkortostan, a village in Nizhnebaltachevsky Selsoviet of Tatyshlinsky District
- Ivanovka, Zianchurinsky District, Republic of Bashkortostan, a village in Tazlarovsky Selsoviet of Zianchurinsky District

=== Belgorod Oblast ===
As of 2012, eleven rural localities in Belgorod Oblast bear this name:

- Ivanovka, Gubkinsky District, Belgorod Oblast, a selo in Gubkinsky District
- Ivanovka, Gubkinsky District, Belgorod Oblast, a selo in Gubkinsky District
- Ivanovka, Gubkinsky District, Belgorod Oblast, a selo in Gubkinsky District
- Ivanovka, Korochansky District, Belgorod Oblast, a khutor in Korochansky District
- Ivanovka, Novooskolsky District, Belgorod Oblast, a selo in Novooskolsky District
- Ivanovka, Prokhorovsky District, Belgorod Oblast, a selo in Prokhorovsky District
- Ivanovka, Rovensky District, Belgorod Oblast, a selo under the administrative jurisdiction of Rovensky Settlement Okrug in Rovensky District
- Ivanovka, Shebekinsky District, Belgorod Oblast, a khutor in Shebekinsky District
- Ivanovka, Shebekinsky District, Belgorod Oblast, a selo in Shebekinsky District
- Ivanovka, Starooskolsky District, Belgorod Oblast, a selo in Starooskolsky District
- Ivanovka, Valuysky District, Belgorod Oblast, a selo in Valuysky District

=== Bryansk Oblast ===
As of 2012, three rural localities in Bryansk Oblast bear this name:

- Ivanovka, Bryansky District, Bryansk Oblast, a settlement in Netyinsky Rural Administrative Okrug of Bryansky District; 53°21′N 34°13′E
- Ivanovka, Klimovsky District, Bryansk Oblast, a village in Novoyurkovichsky Rural Administrative Okrug of Klimovsky District; 52°9′N 31°55′E
- Ivanovka, Krasnogorsky District, Bryansk Oblast, a village in Lotakovsky Rural Administrative Okrug of Krasnogorsky District; 53°6′N 31°35′E

=== Republic of Buryatia ===
As of 2012, two rural localities in the Republic of Buryatia bear this name:

- Ivanovka, Kabansky District, Republic of Buryatia, a settlement under the administrative jurisdiction of the Town of Babushkin in Kabansky District
- Ivanovka, Kyakhtinsky District, Republic of Buryatia, a selo in Tamirsky Selsoviet of Kyakhtinsky District

=== Chuvash Republic ===
As of 2012, two rural localities in the Chuvash Republic bear this name:

- Ivanovka, Morgaushsky District, Chuvash Republic, a village in Moskakasinskoye Rural Settlement of Morgaushsky District
- Ivanovka, Poretsky District, Chuvash Republic, a village in Mishukovskoye Rural Settlement of Poretsky District

=== Irkutsk Oblast ===
As of 2012, one rural locality in Irkutsk Oblast bears this name:

- Ivanovka, Irkutsk Oblast, a farmstead in Angarsky District

=== Kaliningrad Oblast ===
As of 2012, two rural localities in Kaliningrad Oblast bear this name:

- Ivanovka, Polessky District, Kaliningrad Oblast, a settlement in Turgenevsky Rural Okrug of Polessky District
- Ivanovka, Pravdinsky District, Kaliningrad Oblast, a settlement in Mozyrsky Rural Okrug of Pravdinsky District

=== Kaluga Oblast ===
As of 2012, four rural localities in Kaluga Oblast bear this name:

- Ivanovka, Kuybyshevsky District, Kaluga Oblast, a village in Kuybyshevsky District
- Ivanovka, Maloyaroslavetsky District, Kaluga Oblast, a village in Maloyaroslavetsky District
- Ivanovka, Spas-Demensky District, Kaluga Oblast, a village in Spas-Demensky District
- Ivanovka, Ulyanovsky District, Kaluga Oblast, a village in Ulyanovsky District

=== Kemerovo Oblast ===
As of 2012, seven rural localities in Kemerovo Oblast bear this name:

- Ivanovka, Belovsky District, Kemerovo Oblast, a village in Konevskaya Rural Territory of Belovsky District; 54°28′N 86°15′E
- Ivanovka, Chebulinsky District, Kemerovo Oblast, a selo in Ivanovskaya Rural Territory of Chebulinsky District; 55°53′N 87°46′E
- Ivanovka, Krapivinsky District, Kemerovo Oblast, a village in Bannovskaya Rural Territory of Krapivinsky District; 55°8′N 86°44′E
- Ivanovka, Leninsk-Kuznetsky District, Kemerovo Oblast, a settlement in Podgornovskaya Rural Territory of Leninsk-Kuznetsky District; 54°33′N 85°57′E
- Ivanovka, Mariinsky District, Kemerovo Oblast, a village in Suslovskaya Rural Territory of Mariinsky District; 56°8′N 88°14′E
- Ivanovka, Novokuznetsky District, Kemerovo Oblast, a settlement in Bungurskaya Rural Territory of Novokuznetsky District; 53°47′N 87°1′E
- Ivanovka, Prokopyevsky District, Kemerovo Oblast, a settlement in Burlakovskaya Rural Territory of Prokopyevsky District; 54°12′N 86°39′E

=== Kirov Oblast ===
As of 2012, one rural locality in Kirov Oblast bears this name:

- Ivanovka, Kirov Oblast, a settlement in Kobrsky Rural Okrug of Darovskoy District; 59°3′N 48°15′E

=== Komi Republic ===
As of 2012, three rural localities in the Komi Republic bear this name:

- Ivanovka, Kortkerossky District, Komi Republic, a village in Nivshera Selo Administrative Territory of Kortkerossky District; 62°19′N 52°53′E
- Ivanovka, Priluzsky District, Komi Republic, a village in Prokopyevka Selo Administrative Territory of Priluzsky District; 59°17′N 49°39′E
- Ivanovka, Syktyvdinsky District, Komi Republic, a village in Palevitsy Selo Administrative Territory of Syktyvdinsky District; 62°0′N 50°27′E

=== Kostroma Oblast ===
As of 2012, one rural locality in Kostroma Oblast bears this name:

- Ivanovka, Kologrivsky District, Kostroma Oblast, a village in Ilyinskoye Settlement of Kologrivsky District; 58°46′N 44°31′E

=== Krasnodar Krai ===
As of 2012, one rural locality in Krasnodar Krai bears this name:

- Ivanovka, Krasnodar Krai, a khutor in Novovladimirovsky Rural Okrug of Tbilissky District; 45°33′N 40°8′E

=== Krasnoyarsk Krai ===
As of 2012, eleven rural localities in Krasnoyarsk Krai bear this name:

- Ivanovka, Achinsky District, Krasnoyarsk Krai, a selo in Prichulymsky Selsoviet of Achinsky District
- Ivanovka, Birilyussky District, Krasnoyarsk Krai, a village in Orlovsky Selsoviet of Birilyussky District
- Ivanovka, Irbeysky District, Krasnoyarsk Krai, a selo in Ivanovsky Selsoviet of Irbeysky District
- Ivanovka, Kansky District, Krasnoyarsk Krai, a village in Georgiyevsky Selsoviet of Kansky District
- Ivanovka, Nizhneingashsky District, Krasnoyarsk Krai, a selo in Ivanovsky Selsoviet of Nizhneingashsky District
- Ivanovka, Ivanovsky Selsoviet, Partizansky District, Krasnoyarsk Krai, a village in Ivanovsky Selsoviet of Partizansky District
- Ivanovka, Minsky Selsoviet, Partizansky District, Krasnoyarsk Krai, a settlement in Minsky Selsoviet of Partizansky District
- Ivanovka, Rybinsky District, Krasnoyarsk Krai, a selo in Novokamalinsky Selsoviet of Rybinsky District
- Ivanovka, Sharypovsky District, Krasnoyarsk Krai, a selo in Ivanovsky Selsoviet of Sharypovsky District
- Ivanovka, Tyukhtetsky District, Krasnoyarsk Krai, a village in Leontyevsky Selsoviet of Tyukhtetsky District
- Ivanovka, Yermakovsky District, Krasnoyarsk Krai, a selo in Ivanovsky Selsoviet of Yermakovsky District

=== Kursk Oblast ===
As of 2012, eleven rural localities in Kursk Oblast bear this name:

- Ivanovka, Krasnopolyansky Selsoviet, Cheremisinovsky District, Kursk Oblast, a village in Krasnopolyansky Selsoviet of Cheremisinovsky District
- Ivanovka, Stakanovsky Selsoviet, Cheremisinovsky District, Kursk Oblast, a village in Stakanovsky Selsoviet of Cheremisinovsky District
- Ivanovka, Gorshechensky District, Kursk Oblast, a village in Udobensky Selsoviet of Gorshechensky District
- Ivanovka, Nizhnemedveditsky Selsoviet, Kursky District, Kursk Oblast, a village in Nizhnemedveditsky Selsoviet of Kursky District
- Ivanovka, Gostomlyansky Selsoviet, Medvensky District, Kursk Oblast, a village in Gostomlyansky Selsoviet of Medvensky District
- Ivanovka, Vyshnereutchansky Selsoviet, Medvensky District, Kursk Oblast, a khutor in Vyshnereutchansky Selsoviet of Medvensky District
- Ivanovka, Shchigrovsky District, Kursk Oblast, a village in Vishnevsky Selsoviet of Shchigrovsky District
- Ivanovka, Solntsevsky District, Kursk Oblast, a village in Ivanovsky Selsoviet of Solntsevsky District
- Ivanovka, Krasnodolinsky Selsoviet, Sovetsky District, Kursk Oblast, a village in Krasnodolinsky Selsoviet of Sovetsky District
- Ivanovka, Zolotukhinsky District, Kursk Oblast, a village in Sedmikhovsky Selsoviet of Zolotukhinsky District

=== Leningrad Oblast ===
As of 2012, two rural localities in Leningrad Oblast bear this name:

- Ivanovka, Pudostskoye Settlement Municipal Formation, Gatchinsky District, Leningrad Oblast, a village in Pudostskoye Settlement Municipal Formation of Gatchinsky District; 59°37′N 29°59′E
- Ivanovka, Verevskoye Settlement Municipal Formation, Gatchinsky District, Leningrad Oblast, a village in Verevskoye Settlement Municipal Formation of Gatchinsky District; 59°36′N 30°11′E

=== Lipetsk Oblast ===
As of 2012, thirteen rural localities in Lipetsk Oblast bear this name:

- Ivanovka, Chaplyginsky District, Lipetsk Oblast, a selo in Vednovsky Selsoviet of Chaplyginsky District; 53°32′N 39°53′E
- Ivanovka, Dankovsky District, Lipetsk Oblast, a selo in Berezovsky Selsoviet of Dankovsky District; 53°28′N 38°48′E
- Ivanovka, Dobrinsky District, Lipetsk Oblast, a selo in Dubovskoy Selsoviet of Dobrinsky District; 52°25′N 40°15′E
- Ivanovka, Dolgorukovsky District, Lipetsk Oblast, a village in Dolgorukovsky Selsoviet of Dolgorukovsky District; 52°19′N 38°21′E
- Ivanovka, Lebyazhensky Selsoviet, Izmalkovsky District, Lipetsk Oblast, a village in Lebyazhensky Selsoviet of Izmalkovsky District; 52°53′N 37°54′E
- Ivanovka, Petrovsky Selsoviet, Izmalkovsky District, Lipetsk Oblast, a village in Petrovsky Selsoviet of Izmalkovsky District; 52°36′N 38°3′E
- Ivanovka, Novodmitriyevsky Selsoviet, Lipetsky District, Lipetsk Oblast, a village in Novodmitriyevsky Selsoviet of Lipetsky District; 52°40′N 39°15′E
- Ivanovka, Telezhensky Selsoviet, Lipetsky District, Lipetsk Oblast, a village in Telezhensky Selsoviet of Lipetsky District; 52°49′N 39°35′E
- Ivanovka, Berezovsky Selsoviet, Terbunsky District, Lipetsk Oblast, a village in Berezovsky Selsoviet of Terbunsky District; 52°4′N 38°17′E
- Ivanovka, Kurgano-Golovinsky Selsoviet, Terbunsky District, Lipetsk Oblast, a village in Kurgano-Golovinsky Selsoviet of Terbunsky District; 52°14′N 38°16′E
- Ivanovka, Volovsky District, Lipetsk Oblast, a village in Ozhoginsky Selsoviet of Volovsky District; 52°2′N 38°6′E
- Ivanovka, Fedorovsky Selsoviet, Yeletsky District, Lipetsk Oblast, a village in Fedorovsky Selsoviet of Yeletsky District; 52°29′N 38°39′E
- Ivanovka, Kolosovsky Selsoviet, Yeletsky District, Lipetsk Oblast, a village in Kolosovsky Selsoviet of Yeletsky District; 52°45′N 38°39′E

=== Mari El Republic ===
As of 2012, two rural localities in the Mari El Republic bear this name:

- Ivanovka, Orshansky District, Mari El Republic, a village in Markovsky Rural Okrug of Orshansky District
- Ivanovka, Sovetsky District, Mari El Republic, a village in Alexeyevsky Rural Okrug of Sovetsky District

=== Republic of Mordovia ===
As of 2012, six rural localities in the Republic of Mordovia bear this name:

- Ivanovka, Saransk, Republic of Mordovia, a village in Goryaynovsky Selsoviet under the administrative jurisdiction of Oktyabrsky City District of the city of republic significance of Saransk
- Ivanovka, Romodanovsky District, Republic of Mordovia, a village in Konstantinovsky Selsoviet of Romodanovsky District
- Ivanovka, Staroshaygovsky District, Republic of Mordovia, a settlement in Starofedorovsky Selsoviet of Staroshaygovsky District
- Ivanovka, Temnikovsky District, Republic of Mordovia, a village in Kushkinsky Selsoviet of Temnikovsky District
- Ivanovka, Tengushevsky District, Republic of Mordovia, a village in Khlebinsky Selsoviet of Tengushevsky District
- Ivanovka, Zubovo-Polyansky District, Republic of Mordovia, a village in Mordovsko-Polyansky Selsoviet of Zubovo-Polyansky District

=== Moscow Oblast ===
As of 2012, five rural localities in Moscow Oblast bear this name:

- Ivanovka, Domodedovo, Moscow Oblast, a village under the administrative jurisdiction of Domodedovo Town Under Oblast Jurisdiction
- Ivanovka, Naro-Fominsky District, Moscow Oblast, a village under the administrative jurisdiction of the Town of Naro-Fominsk in Naro-Fominsky District
- Ivanovka, Odintsovsky District, Moscow Oblast, a village in Yershovskoye Rural Settlement of Odintsovsky District
- Ivanovka, Ramensky District, Moscow Oblast, a village in Sofyinskoye Rural Settlement of Ramensky District
- Ivanovka, Voskresensky District, Moscow Oblast, a village under the administrative jurisdiction of Beloozersky Work Settlement in Voskresensky District

=== Nizhny Novgorod Oblast ===
As of 2012, eight rural localities in Nizhny Novgorod Oblast bear this name:

- Ivanovka, Bolsheboldinsky District, Nizhny Novgorod Oblast, a settlement in Pikshensky Selsoviet of Bolsheboldinsky District
- Ivanovka, Dalnekonstantinovsky District, Nizhny Novgorod Oblast, a settlement under the administrative jurisdiction of Dalneye Konstantinovo Work Settlement in Dalnekonstantinovsky District
- Ivanovka, Knyagininsky District, Nizhny Novgorod Oblast, a village in Vozrozhdensky Selsoviet of Knyagininsky District
- Ivanovka, Sechenovsky District, Nizhny Novgorod Oblast, a village in Vasilyevsky Selsoviet of Sechenovsky District
- Ivanovka, Sharangsky District, Nizhny Novgorod Oblast, a village in Kushnursky Selsoviet of Sharangsky District
- Ivanovka, Vadsky District, Nizhny Novgorod Oblast, a village in Dubensky Selsoviet of Vadsky District
- Ivanovka, Vorotynsky District, Nizhny Novgorod Oblast, a selo in Semyansky Selsoviet of Vorotynsky District
- Ivanovka, Voznesensky District, Nizhny Novgorod Oblast, a settlement in Sarminsky Selsoviet of Voznesensky District

=== Novosibirsk Oblast ===
As of 2015, three rural localities in Novosibirsk Oblast bear this name:

- Ivanovka, Bagansky District, Novosibirsk Oblast, a selo in Bagansky District
- Ivanovka, Kyshtovsky District, Novosibirsk Oblast, a village in Kyshtovsky District
- Ivanovka, Tatarsky District, Novosibirsk Oblast, a village in Tatarsky District

=== Omsk Oblast ===
As of 2012, seven rural localities in Omsk Oblast bear this name:

- Ivanovka, Isilkulsky District, Omsk Oblast, a village in Kukharevsky Rural Okrug of Isilkulsky District
- Ivanovka, Kalachinsky District, Omsk Oblast, a selo in Ivanovsky Rural Okrug of Kalachinsky District
- Ivanovka, Lyubinsky District, Omsk Oblast, a village in Tavrichansky Rural Okrug of Lyubinsky District
- Ivanovka, Moskalensky District, Omsk Oblast, a village in Ivanovsky Rural Okrug of Moskalensky District
- Ivanovka, Sargatsky District, Omsk Oblast, a village in Andreyevsky Rural Okrug of Sargatsky District
- Ivanovka, Tarsky District, Omsk Oblast, a village in Nagorno-Ivanovsky Rural Okrug of Tarsky District
- Ivanovka, Tyukalinsky District, Omsk Oblast, a village in Valuyevsky Rural Okrug of Tyukalinsky District

=== Orenburg Oblast ===
As of 2012, ten rural localities in Orenburg Oblast bear this name:

- Ivanovka, Asekeyevsky District, Orenburg Oblast, a selo in Kutluyevsky Selsoviet of Asekeyevsky District
- Ivanovka, Korovinsky Selsoviet, Buguruslansky District, Orenburg Oblast, a settlement in Korovinsky Selsoviet of Buguruslansky District
- Ivanovka, Pilyuginsky Selsoviet, Buguruslansky District, Orenburg Oblast, a selo in Pilyuginsky Selsoviet of Buguruslansky District
- Ivanovka, Krasnogvardeysky District, Orenburg Oblast, a selo in Ivanovsky Selsoviet of Krasnogvardeysky District
- Ivanovka, Kurmanayevsky District, Orenburg Oblast, a selo in Kostinsky Selsoviet of Kurmanayevsky District
- Ivanovka, Oktyabrsky District, Orenburg Oblast, a selo in Uranbashsky Selsoviet of Oktyabrsky District
- Ivanovka, Orenburgsky District, Orenburg Oblast, a selo in Ivanovsky Selsoviet of Orenburgsky District
- Ivanovka, Sol-Iletsky District, Orenburg Oblast, a selo in Troitsky Selsoviet of Sol-Iletsky District
- Ivanovka, Sorochinsky District, Orenburg Oblast, a selo in Baklanovsky Selsoviet of Sorochinsky District
- Ivanovka, Tyulgansky District, Orenburg Oblast, a selo in Ivanovsky Selsoviet of Tyulgansky District

=== Oryol Oblast ===
As of 2012, twelve rural localities in Oryol Oblast bear this name:

- Ivanovka, Glazunovsky District, Oryol Oblast, a village in Otradinsky Selsoviet of Glazunovsky District
- Ivanovka, Krasnozorensky District, Oryol Oblast, a village in Uspensky Selsoviet of Krasnozorensky District
- Ivanovka, Livensky District, Oryol Oblast, a village in Nikolsky Selsoviet of Livensky District
- Ivanovka, Orlovsky District, Oryol Oblast, a settlement in Stanovo-Kolodezsky Selsoviet of Orlovsky District
- Ivanovka, Danilovsky Selsoviet, Pokrovsky District, Oryol Oblast, a village in Danilovsky Selsoviet of Pokrovsky District
- Ivanovka, Ivanovsky Selsoviet, Pokrovsky District, Oryol Oblast, a village in Ivanovsky Selsoviet of Pokrovsky District
- Ivanovka, Stolbetsky Selsoviet, Pokrovsky District, Oryol Oblast, a village in Stolbetsky Selsoviet of Pokrovsky District
- Ivanovka, Gerasimovsky Selsoviet, Shablykinsky District, Oryol Oblast, a village in Gerasimovsky Selsoviet of Shablykinsky District
- Ivanovka, Navlinsky Selsoviet, Shablykinsky District, Oryol Oblast, a village in Navlinsky Selsoviet of Shablykinsky District
- Ivanovka, Soskovsky District, Oryol Oblast, a village in Alpeyevsky Selsoviet of Soskovsky District
- Ivanovka, Galichinsky Selsoviet, Verkhovsky District, Oryol Oblast, a village in Galichinsky Selsoviet of Verkhovsky District
- Ivanovka, Vasilyevsky Selsoviet, Verkhovsky District, Oryol Oblast, a village in Vasilyevsky Selsoviet of Verkhovsky District

=== Penza Oblast ===
As of 2012, nine rural localities in Penza Oblast bear this name:

- Ivanovka, Bashmakovsky District, Penza Oblast, a village in Vysokinsky Selsoviet of Bashmakovsky District
- Ivanovka, Bekovsky District, Penza Oblast, a selo in Ivanovsky Selsoviet of Bekovsky District
- Ivanovka, Gorodishchensky District, Penza Oblast, a selo in Yulovsky Selsoviet of Gorodishchensky District
- Ivanovka, Issinsky District, Penza Oblast, a village in Uvarovsky Selsoviet of Issinsky District
- Ivanovka, Lopatinsky District, Penza Oblast, a selo in Chardymsky Selsoviet of Lopatinsky District
- Ivanovka, Mokshansky District, Penza Oblast, a village in Uspensky Selsoviet ofvillage
- Ivanovka, Kuchkinsky Selsoviet, Penzensky District, Penza Oblast, a village in Kuchkinsky Selsoviet of Penzensky District
- Ivanovka, Voskresenovsky Selsoviet, Penzensky District, Penza Oblast, a selo in Voskresenovsky Selsoviet of Penzensky District
- Ivanovka, Shemysheysky District, Penza Oblast, a village in Koldaissky Selsoviet of Shemysheysky District

=== Perm Krai ===
As of 2012, four rural localities in Perm Krai bear this name:

- Ivanovka, Chaykovsky, Perm Krai, a village under the administrative jurisdiction of the town of krai significance of Chaykovsky
- Ivanovka, Dobryanka, Perm Krai, a village under the administrative jurisdiction of the town of krai significance of Dobryanka
- Ivanovka, Chernushinsky District, Perm Krai, a village in Chernushinsky District
- Ivanovka, Kungursky District, Perm Krai, a village in Kungursky District

=== Primorsky Krai ===
As of 2012, one rural locality in Primorsky Krai bears this name:

- Ivanovka, Primorsky Krai, a selo in Mikhaylovsky District

=== Pskov Oblast ===
As of 2012, one rural locality in Pskov Oblast bears this name:

- Ivanovka, Pskov Oblast, a village in Pytalovsky District

=== Rostov Oblast ===
As of 2012, eight rural localities in Rostov Oblast bear this name:

- Ivanovka, Dubovsky District, Rostov Oblast, a khutor in Andreyevskoye Rural Settlement of Dubovsky District
- Ivanovka, Millerovsky District, Rostov Oblast, a khutor in Pervomayskoye Rural Settlement of Millerovsky District
- Ivanovka, Milyutinsky District, Rostov Oblast, a khutor in Nikolo-Berezovskoye Rural Settlement of Milyutinsky District
- Ivanovka, Neklinovsky District, Rostov Oblast, a selo in Nosovskoye Rural Settlement of Neklinovsky District
- Ivanovka, Barilo-Krepinskoye Rural Settlement, Rodionovo-Nesvetaysky District, Rostov Oblast, a khutor in Barilo-Krepinskoye Rural Settlement of Rodionovo-Nesvetaysky District
- Ivanovka, Voloshinskoye Rural Settlement, Rodionovo-Nesvetaysky District, Rostov Oblast, a khutor in Voloshinskoye Rural Settlement of Rodionovo-Nesvetaysky District
- Ivanovka, Salsky District, Rostov Oblast, a selo in Ivanovskoye Rural Settlement of Salsky District
- Ivanovka, Tselinsky District, Rostov Oblast, a khutor in Khleborobnoye Rural Settlement of Tselinsky District

=== Ryazan Oblast ===
As of 2012, nine rural localities in Ryazan Oblast bear this name:

- Ivanovka, Skopin, Ryazan Oblast, a village under the administrative jurisdiction of the town of oblast significance of Skopin
- Ivanovka, Chuchkovsky District, Ryazan Oblast, a village in Tserlevsky Rural Okrug of Chuchkovsky District
- Ivanovka, Kadomsky District, Ryazan Oblast, a village in Kotelinsky Rural Okrug of Kadomsky District
- Ivanovka, Pitelinsky District, Ryazan Oblast, a village in Gridinsky Rural Okrug of Pitelinsky District
- Ivanovka, Ivanovsky Rural Okrug, Sarayevsky District, Ryazan Oblast, a village in Ivanovsky Rural Okrug of Sarayevsky District
- Ivanovka, Muravlyansky Rural Okrug, Sarayevsky District, Ryazan Oblast, a village in Muravlyansky Rural Okrug of Sarayevsky District
- Ivanovka, Batkovsky Rural Okrug, Sasovsky District, Ryazan Oblast, a village in Batkovsky Rural Okrug of Sasovsky District
- Ivanovka, Chubarovsky Rural Okrug, Sasovsky District, Ryazan Oblast, a village in Chubarovsky Rural Okrug of Sasovsky District
- Ivanovka, Shilovsky District, Ryazan Oblast, a village in Mosolovsky Rural Okrug of Shilovsky District

=== Samara Oblast ===
As of 2012, three rural localities in Samara Oblast bear this name:

- Ivanovka, Bogatovsky District, Samara Oblast, a selo in Bogatovsky District
- Ivanovka, Isaklinsky District, Samara Oblast, a settlement in Isaklinsky District
- Ivanovka, Shentalinsky District, Samara Oblast, a village in Shentalinsky District

=== Saratov Oblast ===
As of 2012, thirteen rural localities in Saratov Oblast bear this name:

- Ivanovka, Balakovo, Saratov Oblast, a selo under the administrative jurisdiction of the city of oblast significance of Balakovo
- Ivanovka, Arkadaksky District, Saratov Oblast, a selo in Arkadaksky District
- Ivanovka, Balakovsky District, Saratov Oblast, a selo in Balakovsky District
- Ivanovka, Balashovsky District, Saratov Oblast, a selo in Balashovsky District
- Ivanovka, Bazarno-Karabulaksky District, Saratov Oblast, a selo in Bazarno-Karabulaksky District
- Ivanovka, Fyodorovsky District, Saratov Oblast, a selo in Fyodorovsky District
- Ivanovka, Ivanteyevsky District, Saratov Oblast, a selo in Ivanteyevsky District
- Ivanovka, Khvalynsky District, Saratov Oblast, a selo in Khvalynsky District
- Ivanovka, Petrovsky District, Saratov Oblast, a village in Petrovsky District
- Ivanovka, Turkovsky District, Saratov Oblast, a selo in Turkovsky District
- Ivanovka, Volsky District, Saratov Oblast, a selo in Volsky District
- Ivanovka, Yekaterinovsky District, Saratov Oblast, a selo in Yekaterinovsky District
- Ivanovka, Yekaterinovsky District, Saratov Oblast, a village in Yekaterinovsky District

=== Smolensk Oblast ===
As of 2012, three rural localities in Smolensk Oblast bear this name:

- Ivanovka, Khislavichsky District, Smolensk Oblast, a village in Cherepovskoye Rural Settlement of Khislavichsky District
- Ivanovka, Pochinkovsky District, Smolensk Oblast, a village in Shmakovskoye Rural Settlement of Pochinkovsky District
- Ivanovka, Roslavlsky District, Smolensk Oblast, a village in Saveyevskoye Rural Settlement of Roslavlsky District

=== Sverdlovsk Oblast ===
As of 2012, three rural localities in Sverdlovsk Oblast bear this name:

- Ivanovka, Slobodo-Turinsky District, Sverdlovsk Oblast, a village in Slobodo-Turinsky District
- Ivanovka, Talitsky District, Sverdlovsk Oblast, a village in Talitsky District
- Ivanovka, Tugulymsky District, Sverdlovsk Oblast, a selo in Tugulymsky District

=== Tambov Oblast ===
As of 2012, sixteen rural localities in Tambov Oblast bear this name:

- Ivanovka, Bondarsky District, Tambov Oblast, a village in Pribytkinsky Selsoviet of Bondarsky District
- Ivanovka, Gavrilovsky District, Tambov Oblast, a selo in Gavrilovsky 2-y Selsoviet of Gavrilovsky District
- Ivanovka, Inzhavinsky District, Tambov Oblast, a village in Zemlyansky Selsoviet of Inzhavinsky District
- Ivanovka, Mordovsky District, Tambov Oblast, a selo in Ivanovsky Selsoviet of Mordovsky District
- Ivanovka, Morshansky District, Tambov Oblast, a village in Starotomnikovsky Selsoviet of Morshansky District
- Ivanovka, Nikiforovsky District, Tambov Oblast, a selo in Ozersky Selsoviet of Nikiforovsky District
- Ivanovka, Petrovsky Selsoviet, Petrovsky District, Tambov Oblast, a selo in Petrovsky Selsoviet of Petrovsky District
- Ivanovka, Volchkovsky Selsoviet, Petrovsky District, Tambov Oblast, a village in Volchkovsky Selsoviet of Petrovsky District
- Ivanovka, Rasskazovsky District, Tambov Oblast, a village in Pichersky Selsoviet of Rasskazovsky District
- Ivanovka, Chakinsky Selsoviet, Rzhaksinsky District, Tambov Oblast, a village in Chakinsky Selsoviet of Rzhaksinsky District
- Ivanovka, Lukinsky Selsoviet, Rzhaksinsky District, Tambov Oblast, a village in Lukinsky Selsoviet of Rzhaksinsky District
- Ivanovka, Sampursky District, Tambov Oblast, a selo in Ivanovsky Selsoviet of Sampursky District
- Ivanovka, Staroyuryevsky District, Tambov Oblast, a village in Podgornensky Selsoviet of Staroyuryevsky District
- Ivanovka, Umyotsky District, Tambov Oblast, a selo under the administrative jurisdiction of Umyotsky Settlement Council in Umyotsky District
- Ivanovka, Uvarovsky District, Tambov Oblast, a village in Berezovsky Selsoviet of Uvarovsky District
- Ivanovka, Zherdevsky District, Tambov Oblast, a selo in Sukmanovsky Selsoviet of Zherdevsky District

=== Republic of Tatarstan ===
As of 2012, five rural localities in the Republic of Tatarstan bear this name:

- Ivanovka, Leninogorsky District, Republic of Tatarstan, a selo in Leninogorsky District
- Ivanovka, Sarmanovsky District, Republic of Tatarstan, a village in Sarmanovsky District
- Ivanovka (Koshki-Novotimbayevskoye Rural Settlement), Tetyushsky District, Republic of Tatarstan, a village in Tetyushsky District; municipally, a part of Koshki-Novotimbayevskoye Rural Settlement of that district
- Ivanovka (Uryumskoye Rural Settlement), Tetyushsky District, Republic of Tatarstan, a village in Tetyushsky District; municipally, a part of Uryumskoye Rural Settlement of that district
- Ivanovka, Vysokogorsky District, Republic of Tatarstan, a village in Vysokogorsky District

=== Tula Oblast ===
As of 2012, eight rural localities in Tula Oblast bear this name:

- Ivanovka, Dubensky District, Tula Oblast, a village in Nadezhdinsky Rural Okrug of Dubensky District
- Ivanovka, Baranovsky Rural Okrug, Kimovsky District, Tula Oblast, a village in Baranovsky Rural Okrug of Kimovsky District
- Ivanovka, Zubovsky Rural Okrug, Kimovsky District, Tula Oblast, a village in Zubovsky Rural Okrug of Kimovsky District
- Ivanovka, Kurkinsky District, Tula Oblast, a village in Ivanovskaya Volost of Kurkinsky District
- Ivanovka, Leninsky District, Tula Oblast, a village in Arkhangelsky Rural Okrug of Leninsky District
- Ivanovka, Plavsky District, Tula Oblast, a village in Chastinsky Rural Okrug of Plavsky District
- Ivanovka, Shchyokinsky District, Tula Oblast, a village in Kostomarovskaya Rural Administration of Shchyokinsky District
- Ivanovka, Uzlovsky District, Tula Oblast, a selo in Velminskaya Rural Administration of Uzlovsky District

=== Tver Oblast ===
As of 2012, four rural localities in Tver Oblast bear this name:

- Ivanovka, Belsky District, Tver Oblast, a village in Prigorodnoye Rural Settlement of Belsky District
- Ivanovka, Kalyazinsky District, Tver Oblast, a village in Starobislovskoye Rural Settlement of Kalyazinsky District
- Ivanovka, Kimrsky District, Tver Oblast, a khutor in Privolzhskoye Rural Settlement of Kimrsky District
- Ivanovka, Oleninsky District, Tver Oblast, a village in Grishinskoye Rural Settlement of Oleninsky District

=== Tyumen Oblast ===
As of 2012, three rural localities in Tyumen Oblast bear this name:

- Ivanovka, Ishimsky District, Tyumen Oblast, a village in Cheremshansky Rural Okrug of Ishimsky District
- Ivanovka, Uvatsky District, Tyumen Oblast, a selo in Ivanovsky Rural Okrug of Uvatsky District
- Ivanovka, Yalutorovsky District, Tyumen Oblast, a selo in Ivanovsky Rural Okrug of Yalutorovsky District

=== Udmurt Republic ===
As of 2012, one rural locality in the Udmurt Republic bears this name:

- Ivanovka, Udmurt Republic, a village in Porozovsky Selsoviet of Sharkansky District

=== Ulyanovsk Oblast ===
As of 2012, four rural localities in Ulyanovsk Oblast bear this name:

- Ivanovka, Novomalyklinsky District, Ulyanovsk Oblast, a settlement in Srednesantimirsky Rural Okrug of Novomalyklinsky District
- Ivanovka, Pavlovsky District, Ulyanovsk Oblast, a village in Kholstovsky Rural Okrug of Pavlovsky District
- Ivanovka, Staromaynsky District, Ulyanovsk Oblast, a selo in Pribrezhnensky Rural Okrug of Staromaynsky District
- Ivanovka, Ulyanovsky District, Ulyanovsk Oblast, a selo in Zelenoroshchinsky Rural Okrug of Ulyanovsky District

=== Vladimir Oblast ===
As of 2012, two rural localities in Vladimir Oblast bear this name:

- Ivanovka, Gus-Khrustalny District, Vladimir Oblast, a village in Gus-Khrustalny District
- Ivanovka, Vyaznikovsky District, Vladimir Oblast, a village in Vyaznikovsky District

=== Volgograd Oblast ===
As of 2012, three rural localities in Volgograd Oblast bear this name:

- Ivanovka, Oktyabrsky District, Volgograd Oblast, a selo in Ivanovsky Selsoviet of Oktyabrsky District
- Ivanovka, Svetloyarsky District, Volgograd Oblast, a selo in Kirovsky Selsoviet of Svetloyarsky District
- Ivanovka, Yelansky District, Volgograd Oblast, a selo in Ivanovsky Selsoviet of Yelansky District

=== Vologda Oblast ===
As of 2012, one rural locality in Vologda Oblast bears this name:

- Ivanovka, Vologda Oblast, a village in Markovsky Selsoviet of Vologodsky District

=== Voronezh Oblast ===
As of 2012, ten rural localities in Voronezh Oblast bear this name:

- Ivanovka, Borisoglebsky Urban Okrug, Voronezh Oblast, a settlement under the administrative jurisdiction of Borisoglebsky Urban Okrug
- Ivanovka, Pervomayskoye Rural Settlement, Ertilsky District, Voronezh Oblast, a settlement in Pervomayskoye Rural Settlement of Ertilsky District
- Ivanovka, Ertil Urban Settlement, Ertilsky District, Voronezh Oblast, a settlement under the administrative jurisdiction of Ertil Urban Settlement in Ertilsky District
- Ivanovka, Mitrofanovskoye Rural Settlement, Kantemirovsky District, Voronezh Oblast, a selo in Mitrofanovskoye Rural Settlement of Kantemirovsky District
- Ivanovka, Osikovskoye Rural Settlement, Kantemirovsky District, Voronezh Oblast, a selo in Osikovskoye Rural Settlement of Kantemirovsky District
- Ivanovka, Khokholsky District, Voronezh Oblast, a selo in Rudkinskoye Rural Settlement of Khokholsky District
- Ivanovka, Novokhopyorsky District, Voronezh Oblast, a village under the administrative jurisdiction of Novokhopyorsk Urban Settlement in Novokhopyorsky District
- Ivanovka, Paninsky District, Voronezh Oblast, a selo in Progressovskoye Rural Settlement of Paninsky District
- Ivanovka, Rossoshansky District, Voronezh Oblast, a selo in Novokalitvenskoye Rural Settlement of Rossoshansky District
- Ivanovka, Semiluksky District, Voronezh Oblast, a village in Novosilskoye Rural Settlement of Semiluksky District

=== Yaroslavl Oblast ===
As of 2012, one rural locality in Yaroslavl Oblast bears this name:

- Ivanovka, Yaroslavl Oblast, a village in Breytovsky Rural Okrug of Breytovsky District

=== Zabaykalsky Krai ===
As of 2012, one rural locality in Zabaykalsky Krai bears this name:

- Ivanovka, Zabaykalsky Krai, a selo in Nerchinsko-Zavodsky District

== Abolished localities ==
- Ivanovka, Mezhevskoy District, Kostroma Oblast, a village in Rodinsky Selsoviet of Mezhevskoy District of Kostroma Oblast; abolished on October 6, 2004
- Ivanovka, Kulebaksky District, Nizhny Novgorod Oblast, a village in Mikhaylovsky Selsoviet of Kulebaksky District in Nizhny Novgorod Oblast; abolished in April 2008
- Ivanovka, Severny District, Novosibirsk Oblast, a settlement in Severny District of Novosibirsk Oblast; abolished in April 2015
- Ivanovka, Mokshansky District, Penza Oblast, a village in Uspensky Selsoviet of Mokshansky District in Penza Oblast; abolished in December 2010

== Renamed localities ==
- Ivanovka, name of Staraya Ivanovka, a village in Tukayevsky Selsoviet of Aurgazinsky District in the Republic of Bashkortostan, before September 2007
- Ivanovka, name of Mikhaylovka, a selo in Beloozersky Selsoviet of Gafuriysky District in the Republic of Bashkortostan, before September 2007
- Ivanovka, name of Chalmny-Varre, a former village in the Lovozersky District of Murmansk Oblast, before 1932

== Alternative names ==
- Ivanovka, alternative name of Shchuchye, a village in Popovsky Selsoviet of Vargashinsky District in Kurgan Oblast; 55°22′N 66°6′E
