= Novoodinsk =

Novoodinsk Новоодинск
- Village
- Location within Irkutsk Oblast Location within Russia
- Coordinates: 52°18′N 103°43′E
- Country: Russia
- Region: Irkutsk Oblast
- District: Angarsky District
- Time zone: UTC+8:00

Novoodinsk (Russian: Новоодинск) is a rural locality (a settlement) in Angarsky District, Irkutsk Oblast, Russia. Population: 88 (2010 census);

== Geography ==
This rural locality is located 29 kilometres (18 mi) from Angarsk (the district's administrative centre), 38 kilometres (24 mi) from Irkutsk (capital of Irkutsk Oblast) and 4,511 kilometres (2,803 mi) from Moscow. Savvateyevka is the nearest rural locality.
