= Aleksey Baburin =

Ukrainian politician

Oleksiy Baburin
- Олексій Бабурін
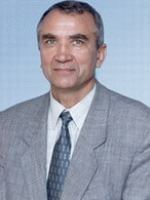

Member of the Verkhovna Rada
- In office 12 May 1998 – 12 December 2012

Personal details
- Born: Oleksiy Vasylovych Baburin; 11 January 1949 (age 77) Ivanovka, Russia, Soviet Union

Oleksiy Vasylovych Baburin (Ukrainian: Олексій Васильович Бабурін, born on 11 January 1949), is a Russian-born Ukrainian politician who had served as a member of the Verkhonva Rada from 1998 to 2012. He is a member of the Communist Party of Ukraine.

== Biography ==
Aleksey Baburin was born on 11 January 1949, in Ivanovka of the Vygonichsky District, in Bryansk Oblast, Russian SFSR. In 1952, the family moved to Makiivka, Donetsk Oblast', Ukrainian SSR.

=== Education ===
- 1971 – Dnipropetrovsk Chemical Technology Institute as chemical process engineer
- 1991 – Kyiv Institute of Political and Social Management

Baburin served in the Soviet army 1971–1973.

=== Career ===
- October 1973 – foreman, then senior foreman, deputy galvanizing shop superintendent at Zaporizhzhia Automobile Plant; Deputy Secretary of Party Committee
- 1983–1991 – Secretary of the Party Committee
- 1991 – Deputy Head of Department for logistics and maintenance, 1st Deputy business manager of Zaporizhzhia Automobile Plant
- 1996–1998 – 1st Deputy business manager, Deputy Head, Head of the Department at JSC "AvtoZAZ"

In March 2006, he was elected the Deputy to Zaporizhzhia Oblast Council.

=== Verkhovna Rada ===
- March 1998 – April 2002 – People's Deputy of Ukraine in 3rd Verkhovna Rada, election district No. 75, Zaporizhzhia Oblast
- April 2002 – April 2006 – People's Deputy of Ukraine in 4th Verkhovna Rada, No. 23 in the list from the Communist Party of Ukraine
- April 2006 – November 2007 – People's Deputy of Ukraine in 5th Verkhovna Rada, № 21 in the list from the Communist Party
- November 2007 – December 2012 – People's Deputy of Ukraine in 6th Verkhovna Rada from the Communist Party, № 13 in the list

Baburin did not return to parliament after the 2012 Ukrainian parliamentary election after losing in single-member districts number 74 (first-past-the-post wins a parliament seat) located in Zaporizhzhia Oblast.

== Family ==
Aleksey Baburin is married and has two sons and a daughter.

== See also ==
- 2007 Ukrainian parliamentary election
- List of Ukrainian Parliament Members 2007
- Verkhovna Rada
