= Roman Popov =

Roman Popov may refer to:

- Roman Popov (footballer), Ukrainian footballer
- Roman Popov (ice hockey), Russian ice hockey player
