= Tatarsky =

Tatarsky (masculine), Tatarskaya (feminine), or Tatarskoye (neuter) may refer to:

== Persons with the name ==
- Alex Tatarsky, performance artist
- Alexander Tatarsky (1950–2007), Soviet/Russian film director
- Vavilen Tatarsky, the main pratagonist of the Russian fiction novel Generation "П"
- Vladlen Tatarsky, pseudonym of Russian-Ukrainian military blogger Maxim Fomin (1982–2023)

== Places ==
- Tatarsky District, a district of Novosibirsk Oblast, Russia
- Tatarsky (inhabited locality) (Tatarskaya, Tatarskoye), name of several rural localities in Russia
