= 2020 Irkutsk prison riot =

Prison riot in Russia

The 2020 Irkutsk prison riot was a prison riot in the IK-15 penal colony in the Irkutsk Oblast, Russia, on 9 April 2020.

== Riot ==
On 9 April 2020, prisoners at the IK-15 penal colony in Angarsk, Irkutsk Oblast staged a riot. The riot occurred after an incident in which the prison guards severely beat a prisoner, leading to that prison attempting suicide. Prisoners had also previously raised complaints over mistreatment and over the prison's decision to ban visits and mail due to the COVID-19 pandemic in Russia. The riot lasted until the next day, when special forces were deployed to suppress it. At least one prisoner, Maksim Dautov, was killed during the riot, and one other died of his injuries following the riot.

== Allegations of torture following the riot ==
Following the suppression of the riot, a number of prisoners were transferred out of IK-15 into other penal colonies in Irkutsk. Dozens of prisoners, including some who were transferred and some who weren't, have subsequently made allegations that they were tortured after the end of the riot. According to Agence France Press, "prison guards embarked on a brutal campaign of retribution for the mutiny, turning inmates on each other to extract confessions with beatings and sexual violence." According to the BBC News, "human rights activists estimate at least 350 prisoners were tortured after the riots."

Kezhik Ondar, a prisoner who was transferred to the Pretrial Detention Center No. 1, was tortured and raped following his transfer after he refused to make a false confession of having instigated the riot. The inmates of the Pretrial Detention Centre were sentenced to 10 years incarceration for their role in the torture, while the prison guards who participated were sentenced to 5 years. In 2025, the sentences of the prison guards was reduced to 2 years.

Tahirjon Bakiev, who was serving a sentence for gun theft, was transferred to the Corrective colony No. 6, Irkutsk Oblast. There, he was tortured and raped. In early 2024, he committed suicide.
