= Ivanovka, Irkutsk Oblast =

Ivanovka Ивановка
- Village
- Location within Irkutsk Oblast Location within Russia
- Coordinates: 52°20′N 103°17′E
- Country: Russia
- Region: Irkutsk Oblast
- District: Angarsky District
- Time zone: UTC+8:00

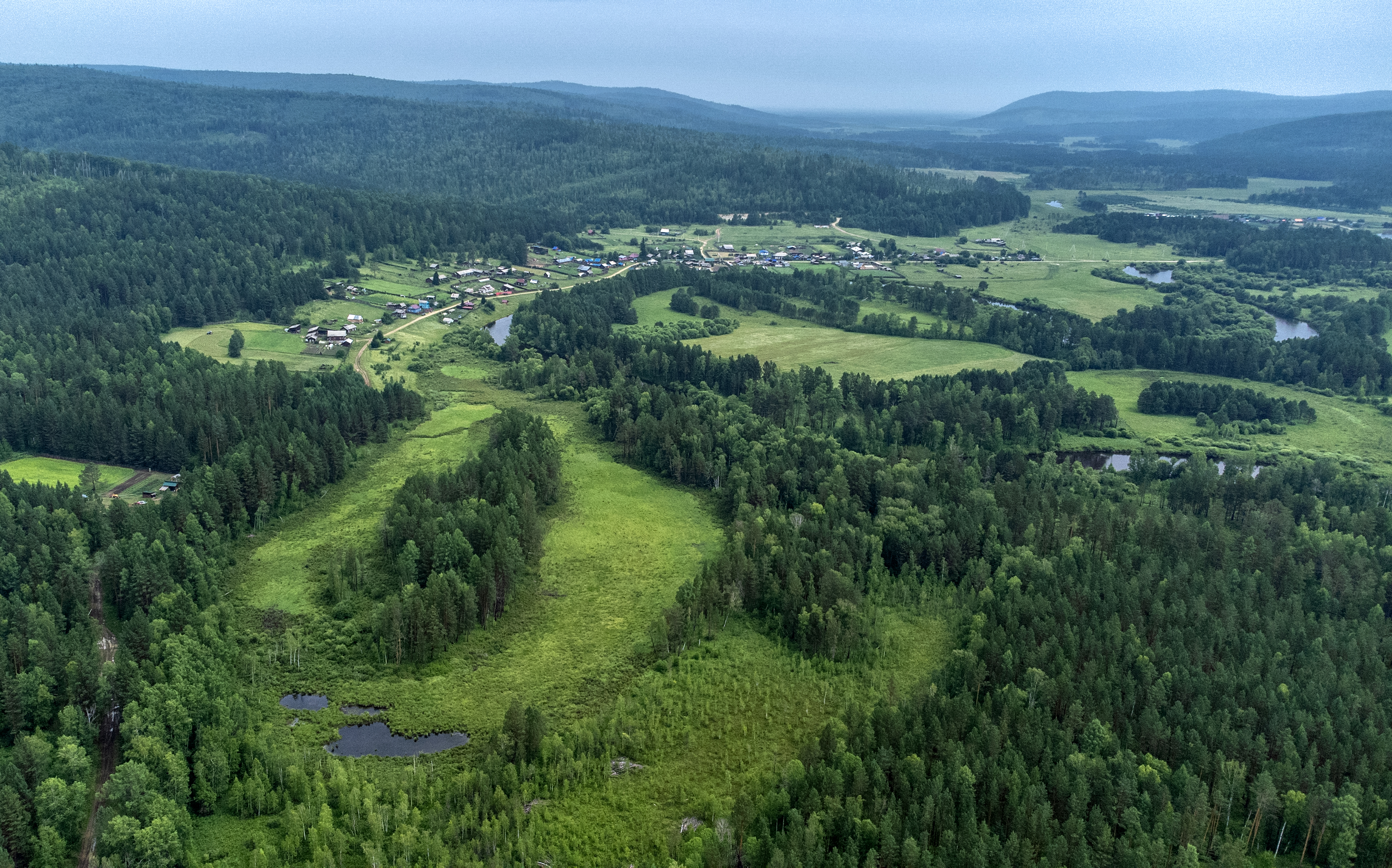
Aerial view of Ivanovka

Ivanovka (Russian: Ивановка) is a rural locality (a settlement) in Angarsky District, Irkutsk Oblast, Russia. Population: 94 (2010 census);

== Geography ==
This rural locality is located 47 kilometres (29 mi) from Angarsk (the district's administrative centre), 68 kilometres (42 mi) from Irkutsk (capital of Irkutsk Oblast) and 4,477 kilometres (2,782 mi) from Moscow. Nikolayevka is the nearest rural locality.
