= Tyumen Maniac =

Alleged unidentified Russian serial killer

The Tyumen Maniac

Details
- Victims: 8+
- Span of crimes: 1997 – 2009 (known)
- Country: Russia
- States: Tyumen, possibly others
- Date apprehended: N/A

The Tyumen Maniac (Russian: Тюменский маньяк, romanized: Tyumenskiy manyak) is the name given to an alleged Russian serial killer thought to be responsible for a number of disappearances of children in Tyumen since 1997. If the profilers' assumptions are correct, he is possibly responsible for the murders of at least 8 children. In 2021, Vitaly Berezhnoy was arrested in connection with the murders.

== Alleged victims ==
- In early 1997, 2-year-old Nikolai Ivanov disappeared in Tyumen. Little information is available about him, as law enforcement agencies refuse to discuss details on his case or provide a photograph.
- In May of that same year, 17-year-old Lyubov Simonova went missing while walking home from visiting her friend's house. A search party consisting of her family and local police was organized, but failed to locate her. Witnesses noted that Simonova was watched by a trio of men, one of whom stuttered heavily.
- In 1998, 13-year-old Irina Kasyanova, the daughter of a wealthy family, disappeared. She was known for her heavy stutter, and a large birthmark on her chest.
- In December 1999, 12-year-old Alyona Imamova went missing from a bus stop on her way home from school.
- In February 2001, 10-year-old Sonya Telesheva was reported missing after not returning home. Her body was found three days later; her neck broken and showing signs of suffocation. According to an unconfirmed anonymous source, the remains of another unidentified girl were found the same day.
- In 2002, 14-year-old Irina Bukrina (Lyubov Simonova's half-sister) went missing on her way home after mailing a letter at the post office. On April 24, her body was found by a truck driver. Her killer had initially strangled her manually, before switching to using a rope. Bukrina's body was missing pieces of clothing, but was not raped, and it appeared that she had not been fed for some time.
- On November 26, 2008, after a long time, 8-year-old Eduard Alimbaev vanished from the school playground he went to after school. While a search was conducted and a monetary reward was offered for any information to locate him, he was never found. Authorities suspect that Alimbaev has been abducted by an unknown kidnapper, but could not provide a clear motive.
- In August 2009, 12-year-old Anastasia Lozhkina disappeared after going to a store. A large search party created by her family, neighbors and law enforcement attempted to find her, but as police dogs were unable to pick up her scent, it was suspected that she had been abducted and taken away in a car.
- Later in October, 12-year-old Anna Anisimova disappeared on her way home from school, and was never found despite intensive searching. Her and Lozhkina's cases were soon combined into one, and from this case, the first identikit of the alleged offender was devised.

=== Possible victims ===
According to profiler Vasily Beinarovich, the suspected killer may have had at least two additional victims in other areas:

- In April 2008, 11-year-old Daria Nekrasova was declared missing after failing to return home from her school in Omsk. Witnesses claimed to have seen her being accompanied by a stranger, who supposedly resembled the sketch of the Tyumen Maniac.
- In March 2014, 13-year-old Ksenia Bokova vanished in similar circumstances in Novoaltaysk. Despite an intensive search, only her bag and mobile phone were located.

Beinarovich has also suggested that the alleged killer's victim count could be much higher.

== Investigation ==
Soon after the Anisimova case, profiler Dmitry Kiryukhin travelled from Saint Petersburg to Tyumen to investigate the cases. After talking with the families of the missing children, he created an identikit of the Tyumen Maniac.

In relation to this, while analyzing Anisimova's mobile phone, it emerged that the girl had called an official of the city's administrative bodies. The man, whose identity has never been publicly released, acknowledged that he had been contacted by Anna, but thought it was a mistake and ignored the initial call. He then called back, but nobody answered him in return.

In June 2020, Moscow-based investigator Yevgeny Karchevsky, who aided with the capture of Mikhail Popkov, was dispatched to Tyumen to help resolve the cases. Shortly after his arrival, the cases of Kasyanova, Imamova, Lozhkina and Anisimova were combined into one, and are currently under investigation.

In August 2021, it was announced that Alexander Bastrykin, the Head of the Investigative Committee of Russia, was given control of the investigation of the alleged serial killer. In October 2021, Kiryukhin gave an interview with NEFT Media, in which he suggested that the killer might select his victims who have eye squints or similar defects.

The case is currently under investigation, and law enforcement agencies are conducting DNA tests in an effort to link other crimes or possibly even catch the perpetrator.

On 26 August 2021, 40-year-old Vitaly Berezhnoy was arrested in connection with the murders. He had killed an 8-year-old girl named Nastya Muravyova two months earlier.

== Psychological portrait ==
Over the years, two separate profilers, Dmitry Kiryukhin and Vasily Beinarovich, have given their thoughts on what characteristics the potential killer might have.

=== Kiryukhin's version ===
- Aged between 40 and 45.
- A closeted paedophile.
- Is well-regarded by his community, has no criminal convictions.
- Either married or divorced, and has children with whom he likely rarely communicates.
- Lives in Tyumen, either in an apartment building or a house in the suburbs.
- Has a technical degree, and works as an electrician at a large enterprise. Due to the nature of his work, he frequently travels around the city.
- Has or has had a car, possibly a Zhiguli, which he sold or dumped in a swamp following Anisimova's murder.
- Does not drink alcohol.
- Uses the Internet, likely kept track of the Anisimova case.
- Possible hobbies include photography and fishing.

=== Beinarovich's version ===
Beinarovich was critical of some of Kiryukhin's assertions, most notably the killer's age, as he could have looked older due to his obesity, as well as questioning his marital status and hobbies. However, he agreed with other points, and improved the existing portrait by adding his own conclusions which resulted in a similar profile:

- Aged 35 or older.
- A closeted paedophile.
- Is well-regarded in his community, with no prior criminal convictions.
- Lives in Tyumen, either in an apartment building or a house in the suburbs.
- Probably committed the first crimes with two accomplices, but then began to act alone.
- Targets children aged 8 to 14.
- Abducts his victims in the middle of the day, luring them into his car through deception.
- Meticulously plans his attacks, leaving behind no evidence of witnesses.
- Likely works or has worked in law enforcement, and at the very least knows the basic procedures of collecting evidence very well.
- Has the ability to monitor children.
- Knows the area very well, and can traverse it very easily.

== See also ==
- List of Russian serial killers

== In media and culture ==
- "For 20 years, children have disappeared in Tyumen", a documentary film from the series 'Satisfaction 21', directed by Vasily Beinarovich. (in Russian)
- "Tyumen and others: how to recognize a maniac in advance?", documentary film. (in Russian)
