= Surovatikha =

Surovatikha (Russian: Суроватиха) is the name of several rural localities in Surovatikhinsky Selsoviet of Dalnekonstantinovsky District of Nizhny Novgorod Oblast, Russia:

- Surovatikha (selo), a selo
- Surovatikha (station settlement), a station settlement
