= 1st Shemyakino =

Rural locality in Kursk Oblast, Russia

1st Shemyakino 1-е Шемякино
- Selo
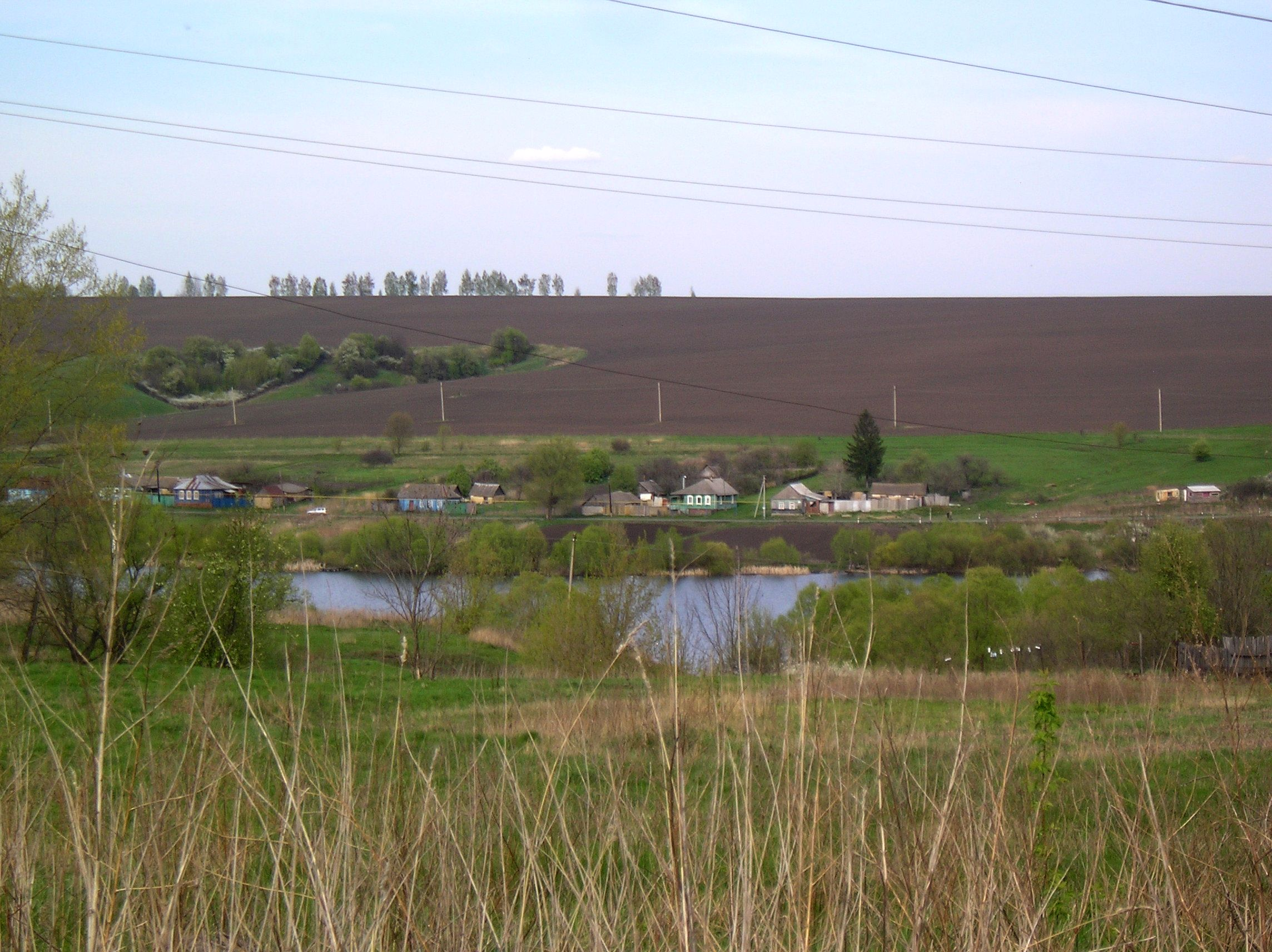
- Interactive map of 1st Shemyakino
- Location of 1st Shemyakino 1st Shemyakino (Kursk Oblast)
- Coordinates: 51°56′13″N 36°01′44″E
- Country: Russia
- Federal subject: Kursk Oblast
- Administrative district: Kursky District
- SelsovietSelsoviet: Nizhnemedveditsky

Population (2010 Census)
  - Total: 125
  - Estimate (2010): 125 (0%)

Municipal status
  - Municipal district: Kursky Municipal District
  - Rural settlement: Nizhnemedveditsky Selsoviet Rural Settlement
- Time zone: UTC+3 (MSK)
- Postal code: 305505
- Dialing code: +7 4712
- OKTMO ID: 38620448156
- Website: nmedvedica.rkursk.ru

1st Shemyakino or Pervoye Shemyakino (Russian: 1-е Шемякино, Первое Шемякино) is a rural locality (Russian: село, lit. 'village') in Nizhnemedveditsky Selsoviet Rural Settlement, Kursky District, Kursk Oblast, Russia. Population: 125 (2010 census); 163 (2002 census);

== Geography ==
The village is located on the Bolshaya Kuritsa River (a right tributary of the Seym River), 100 km from the Russia–Ukraine border, 24.5 km north-west of Kursk, 9.5 km from the selsoviet center – Verkhnyaya Medveditsa.

Climate

1st Shemyakino has a warm-summer humid continental climate (Dfb in the Köppen climate classification).

== Transport ==
1st Shemyakino is located 1.5 km from the federal route M-2 Crimea Highway (a part of the European route E105), on the road of intermunicipal significance 38Н-235 ("Crimea Highway" – 1st Shemyakino – Ivanovka), 19.5 km from the nearest railway halt Bukreyevka (railway line Oryol – Kursk).

The rural locality is situated 27 km from Kursk Vostochny Airport, 147 km from Belgorod International Airport and 220 km from Voronezh Peter the Great Airport.
