= Kuzma Alekseyev =

Leader of Teryukhan unrest in 1806–1810

Kuzma Alekseyev (Russian: Кузьма́ Алексе́ев), possibly his surname is Pilyandin, also known as Kuzya-the-God was a leader of Teryukhan unrest in 1806-1810, proclaimed himself a prophet.

Kuzya-the-God lived in Teryukhan Mordvin village of Makrasha. Combining the Mordvin traditional beliefs with Christianity and conjuring tricks he managed to instill into his deity. He arranged secret devotions in keremet (place of prayers) near Maloye Seskino village. This resulted in Teryukhans' growing cool towards Russian Orthodox Church. A troop was sent to arrest Kuzya-the-God. A court sentenced him to corporal punishment, marking and exile. In September 1810 he was birched in Dalneye Konstantinovo village, Teryushevskaya Volost. The same year he was exiled to Irkutsk Governorate, however there he continued his sectarianism activity.

== Quotes ==
”Jesus Christ is not a God, but a rank, and now this rank is deposed.”

”Peoples will dress the Mordvin clothes and became the same with the Mordvin people”.

”The salvation and the freedom will come from the West”
