= Angarsk State Technical Academy =

Coordinates: 52.5275°N 103.8644°E

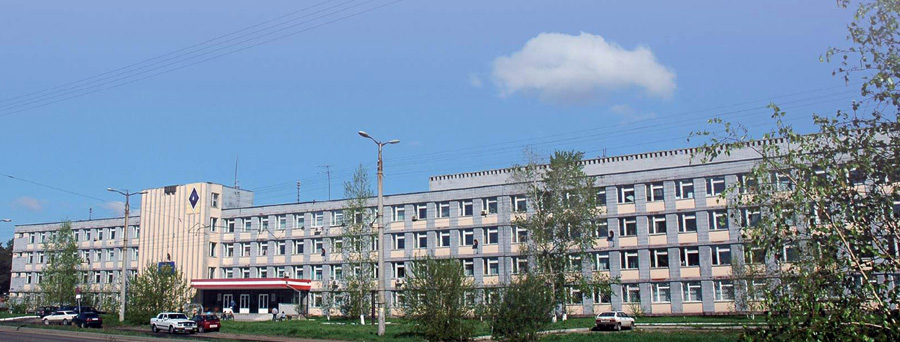
Angarsk State Technical Academy Building

The Angarsk State Technical Academy (Russian: Ангарская Государственная Техническая Академия) is a government-founded educational institution in Angarsk, Russia.

The academy was constructed on the banks of the Angara River after the end of World War II, and opened in 1952 as the Angarsk Industrial Technical Vocational School, a nationwide distance learning polytechnical institute.
