= Tatarsky (inhabited locality) =

Tatarsky (Russian: Татарский; masculine), Tatarskaya (Татарская; feminine), or Tatarskoye (Татарское; neuter) is the name of several rural localities (khutors, villages, and selos) in Russia:

- Tatarsky (rural locality), a khutor in Ploskovsky Selsoviet of Solntsevsky District of Kursk Oblast
- Tatarskoye, Maloyaroslavetsky District, Kaluga Oblast, a village in Maloyaroslavetsky District, Kaluga Oblast
- Tatarskoye, Zhukovsky District, Kaluga Oblast, a village in Zhukovsky District, Kaluga Oblast
- Tatarskoye, Kostroma Oblast, a village in Volzhskoye Settlement of Nerekhtsky District of Kostroma Oblast
- Tatarskoye, Moscow Oblast, a village under the administrative jurisdiction of Domodedovo Town Under Oblast Jurisdiction, Moscow Oblast
- Tatarskoye, Nizhny Novgorod Oblast, a selo in Sarleysky Selsoviet of Dalnekonstantinovsky District of Nizhny Novgorod Oblast
- Tatarskoye, Tula Oblast, a selo in Alexandrovsky Rural Okrug of Zaoksky District of Tula Oblast
- Tatarskoye, Vologda Oblast, a village in Kubinsky Selsoviet of Kharovsky District of Vologda Oblast
- Tatarskoye, Yaroslavl Oblast, a village in Nikolsky Rural Okrug of Danilovsky District of Yaroslavl Oblast
- Tatarskaya, Krasnoyarsk Krai, a village in Podsopochny Selsoviet of Sukhobuzimsky District of Krasnoyarsk Krai
- Tatarskaya, Tyumen Oblast, a village in Shevyrinsky Rural Okrug of Abatsky District of Tyumen Oblast
