= Ivanovka, Aurgazinsky District, Republic of Bashkortostan =

Ivanovka Ивановка
- Village
- Location within Bashkortostan Location within Russia
- Coordinates: 54°01′N 56°04′E
- Country: Russia
- Region: Bashkortostan
- District: Aurgazinsky District
- Time zone: UTC+5:00

Ivanovka (Russian: Ивановка) is a rural locality (a village) in Batyrovsky Selsoviet, Aurgazinsky District, Bashkortostan, Russia. The population was 83 as of 2010. There are 3 streets.

== Geography ==
Ivanovka is located 14 km east of Tolbazy (the district's administrative centre) by road. Knyazevka is the nearest rural locality.
