= Ivanovka, Gafuriysky District, Republic of Bashkortostan =

Ivanovka Ивановка
- Selo
- Location within Bashkortostan Location within Russia
- Coordinates: 53°58′N 56°12′E
- Country: Russia
- Region: Bashkortostan
- District: Gafuriysky District
- Time zone: UTC+5:00

Ivanovka (Russian: Ивановка) is a rural locality (a selo) in Beloozersky Selsoviet, Gafuriysky District, Bashkortostan, Russia. The population was 59 as of 2010. There are 2 streets.

== Geography ==
Ivanovka is located 31 km northwest of Krasnousolsky (the district's administrative centre) by road. Daryino is the nearest rural locality.
