= Ivanovka, Bakalinsky District, Republic of Bashkortostan =

Ivanovka Ивановка
- Village
- Location within Bashkortostan Location within Russia
- Coordinates: 55°08′N 53°12′E
- Country: Russia
- Region: Bashkortostan
- District: Bakalinsky District
- Time zone: UTC+5:00

Ivanovka (Russian: Ивановка) is a rural locality (a village) in Novoursayevsky Selsoviet, Bakalinsky District, Bashkortostan, Russia. The population was 11 as of 2010. There is 1 street.

== Geography ==
Ivanovka is located 47 km west of Bakaly (the district's administrative centre) by road. Nagaybakovo is the nearest rural locality.
