= Ivanovka, Davlekanovsky District, Republic of Bashkortostan =

Ivanovka Ивановка
- Selo
- Location within Bashkortostan Location within Russia
- Coordinates: 54°23′N 54°37′E
- Country: Russia
- Region: Bashkortostan
- District: Davlekanovsky District
- Time zone: UTC+5:00

Ivanovka (Russian: Ивановка) is a rural locality (a selo) and the administrative centre of Ivanovsky Selsoviet, Davlekanovsky District, Bashkortostan, Russia. The population was 749 as of 2010. There are 6 streets.

== Geography ==
Ivanovka is located 36 km northwest of Davlekanovo (the district's administrative centre) by road. Leninsky is the nearest rural locality.
