= Ivanovka, Khokholsky District, Voronezh Oblast =

Ivanovka Ивановка
- Selo
- Location within Voronezh Oblast Location within Russia
- Coordinates: 51°25′N 38°53′E
- Country: Russia
- Region: Voronezh Oblast
- District: Khokholsky District
- Time zone: UTC+3:00

Ivanovka (Russian: Ивановка) is a rural locality (a selo) in Gremyachenskoye Rural Settlement, Khokholsky District, Voronezh Oblast, Russia. The population was 75 as of 2010. There are 6 streets.

== Geography ==
Ivanovka is located on the Yemancha River, 32 km southeast of Khokholsky (the district's administrative centre) by road. Gremyachye is the nearest rural locality.
