= Ivanovka, Fyodorovsky District, Republic of Bashkortostan =

Ivanovka Ивановка
- Village
- Location within Bashkortostan Location within Russia
- Coordinates: 53°08′N 55°18′E
- Country: Russia
- Region: Bashkortostan
- District: Fyodorovsky District
- Time zone: UTC+5:00

Ivanovka (Russian: Ивановка) is a rural locality (a village) in Balyklinsky Selsoviet, Fyodorovsky District, Bashkortostan, Russia. The population was 11 as of 2010. There is 1 street.

== Geography ==
Ivanovka is located 22 km southeast of Fyodorovka (the district's administrative centre) by road. Petrovka is the nearest rural locality.
