= Ivanovka, Paninsky District, Voronezh Oblast =

Ivanovka Ивановка
- Selo
- Location within Voronezh Oblast Location within Russia
- Coordinates: 51°39′N 40°17′E
- Country: Russia
- Region: Voronezh Oblast
- District: Paninsky District
- Time zone: UTC+3:00

Ivanovka (Russian: Ивановка) is a rural locality (a selo) in Progressovskoye Rural Settlement, Paninsky District, Voronezh Oblast, Russia. The population was 107 as of 2010.
