= Ivanovka, Vyshnereutchansky Selsoviet, Medvensky District, Kursk Oblast =

Rural locality in Kursk Oblast, Russia

Ivanovka Ивановка
- Khutor
- Interactive map of Ivanovka
- Location of Ivanovka Ivanovka (Kursk Oblast)
- Coordinates: 51°22′31″N 36°01′15″E
- Country: Russia
- Federal subject: Kursk Oblast
- Administrative district: Medvensky District
- SelsovietSelsoviet: Vyshnereutchansky

Population (2010 Census)
  - Total: 20
  - Estimate (2010): 20 (0%)

Municipal status
  - Municipal district: Medvensky Municipal District
  - Rural settlement: Vyshnereutchansky Selsoviet Rural Settlement
- Time zone: UTC+3 (MSK)
- Postal code: 307048
- Dialing code: +7 47146
- OKTMO ID: 38624416121
- Website: vishereut.rkursk.ru

Ivanovka (Russian: Ивановка) is a rural locality (a khutor) in Vyshnereutchansky Selsoviet Rural Settlement, Medvensky District, Kursk Oblast, Russia. Population: 20 (2010 census); 34 (2002 census);

== Geography ==
The khutor is located on the Reut River (a left tributary of the Seym), 56 km (35 mi) from the Russia–Ukraine border, 38 km (24 mi) south-west of Kursk, 7 km (4.3 mi) south-west of the district center – the urban-type settlement Medvenka, 2 km (1.2 mi) from the selsoviet center – Verkhny Reutets.

Climate

Ivanovka has a warm-summer humid continental climate (Dfb in the Köppen climate classification).

== Transport ==
Ivanovka is located 9 km (5.6 mi) from the federal route M-2 Crimea Highway (a part of the European route E105), on the road of intermunicipal significance 38H-185 (M2 "Crimea Highway" – Gakhovo), 30.5 km (19.0 mi) from the nearest railway halt and passing loop 454 km (railway line Lgov I — Kursk).

The rural locality is situated 45 km (28 mi) from Kursk Vostochny Airport, 89 km (55 mi) from Belgorod International Airport and 228 km (142 mi) from Voronezh Peter the Great Airport.
