= Ivanovka, Meleuzovsky District, Republic of Bashkortostan =

Ivanovka Ивановка
- Village
- Location within Bashkortostan Location within Russia
- Coordinates: 53°07′N 55°56′E
- Country: Russia
- Region: Bashkortostan
- District: Meleuzovsky District
- Time zone: UTC+5:00

Ivanovka (Russian: Ивановка) is a rural locality (a village) in Partizansky Selsoviet, Meleuzovsky District, Bashkortostan, Russia. The population was 133 as of 2010. There are 4 streets.

== Geography ==
Ivanovka is located 24 km north of Meleuz (the district's administrative centre) by road. Beregovka is the nearest rural locality.
