= Ivanovka, Tretyakovsky District, Altai Krai =

Ivanovka Ивановка
- Settlement
- Location within Altai Krai Location within Russia
- Coordinates: 50°55′N 82°24′E
- Country: Russia
- Region: Altai Krai
- District: Tretyakovsky District
- Time zone: UTC+7:00

Ivanovka (Russian: Ивановка) is a rural locality (a settlement) in Shipunikhinsky Selsoviet, Tretyakovsky District, Altai Krai, Russia. The population was 12 as of 2013. There is 1 street.

== Geography ==
Ivanovka is located 39 km southeast of Staroaleyskoye (the district's administrative centre) by road. Shipunikha is the nearest rural locality.
