= Roman Popov (ice hockey) =

Russian ice hockey player

- Born: May 3, 1980 (age 44); Angarsk, Russian SFSR, Soviet Union
- Height: 6 ft 0 in (183 cm)
- Weight: 187 lb (85 kg; 13 st 5 lb)
- Position: Defence
- Shot: Left
- Played for: HC CSK VVS Samara; HC Sibir Novosibirsk; HC MVD; Metallurg Novokuznetsk
- Playing career: 1999–2018

Roman Popov (born May 3, 1980) is a Russian former professional ice hockey defenceman.

Popov played in the Russian Superleague and Kontinental Hockey League for HC CSK VVS Samara, HC Sibir Novosibirsk, HC MVD and Metallurg Novokuznetsk
