= Ivanovka, Zabaykalsky Krai =

Ivanovka Ивановка
- Selo
- Location within Zabaykalsky Krai Location within Russia
- Coordinates: 51°15′N 119°27′E
- Country: Russia
- Region: Zabaykalsky Krai
- District: Nerchinsko-Zavodsky District
- Time zone: UTC+9:00

Ivanovka (Russian: Ивановка) is a rural locality (a selo) in Nerchinsko-Zavodsky District, Zabaykalsky Krai, Russia. Population: 394 (2021 census); 483 (2010 census); 510 (2002 census); There are 3 streets in this selo.

== Geography ==
This rural locality is located 12 km from Nerchinsky Zavod (the district's administrative centre), 424 km from Chita (capital of Zabaykalsky Krai) and 5,717 km from Moscow. Gorny Zerentuy is the nearest rural locality.
