= Ivanovka, Gus-Khrustalny District, Vladimir Oblast =

Ivanovka Ивановка
- Village
- Location within Vladimir Oblast Location within Russia
- Coordinates: 55°42′N 40°37′E
- Country: Russia
- Region: Vladimir Oblast
- District: Gus-Khrustalny District
- Time zone: UTC+3:00

Ivanovka (Russian: Ивановка) is a rural locality (a village) in Posyolok Anopino, Gus-Khrustalny District, Vladimir Oblast, Russia. The population was 6 as of 2010.

== Geography ==
Ivanovka is located 25 km north of Gus-Khrustalny (the district's administrative centre) by road. Komissarovka is the nearest rural locality.
