= Ivanovka, Bizhbulyaksky District, Republic of Bashkortostan =

Ivanovka Ивановка
- Village
- Location within Bashkortostan Location within Russia
- Coordinates: 53°44′N 54°10′E
- Country: Russia
- Region: Bashkortostan
- District: Bizhbulyaksky District
- Time zone: UTC+5:00

Ivanovka (Russian: Ивановка) is a rural locality (a village) in Bizhbulyaksky Selsoviet, Bizhbulyaksky District, Bashkortostan, Russia. The population was 60 as of 2010. There are 3 streets.

== Geography ==
Ivanovka is located 9 km northwest of Bizhbulyak (the district's administrative centre) by road. Kalinovka is the nearest rural locality.
