= Ivanovka, Oktyabrsky District, Volgograd Oblast =

Ivanovka Ивановка
- Selo
- Location within Volgograd Oblast Location within Russia
- Coordinates: 48°11′N 43°41′E
- Country: Russia
- Region: Volgograd Oblast
- District: Oktyabrsky District
- Time zone: UTC+4:00

Ivanovka (Russian: Ивановка) is a rural locality (a selo) and the administrative center of Ivanovskoye Rural Settlement, Oktyabrsky District, Volgograd Oblast, Russia. The population was 511 in 2010. There are 16 streets.

== Geography ==
The village is located in steppe on Yergeni, on the Myshkova River, 190 kilometres (120 mi) from Volgograd and 37 kilometres (23 mi) from Oktyabrsky.
