= Ivanovka, Svetloyarsky District, Volgograd Oblast =

Ivanovka Ивановка
- Selo
- Location within Volgograd Oblast Location within Russia
- Coordinates: 48°28′N 44°22′E
- Country: Russia
- Region: Volgograd Oblast
- District: Svetloyarsky District
- Time zone: UTC+4:00

Ivanovka (Russian: Ива́новка) is a rural locality (a khutor) in Svetloyarsky District, Volgograd Oblast, Russia. The population was 998 in 2010. There are 18 streets.
