= Ivanovka, Kuryinsky District, Altai Krai =

Ivanovka Ивановка
- Selo
- Location within Altai Krai Location within Russia
- Coordinates: 51°34′N 82°01′E
- Country: Russia
- Region: Altai Krai
- District: Kuryinsky District
- Time zone: UTC+7:00

Ivanovka (Russian: Ивановка) is a rural locality (a selo) and the administrative center of Ivanovsky Selsoviet, Kuryinsky District, Altai Krai, Russia. The population was 796 as of 2013. There are 17 streets.

== Geography ==
Ivanovka is located 20 km west of Kurya (the district's administrative centre) by road. Kuznetsovo is the nearest rural locality.
