= Ivanovka, Zavitinsky District, Amur Oblast =

Ivanovka Ивановка
- Selo
- Location within Amur Oblast Location within Russia
- Coordinates: 49°58′N 129°10′E
- Country: Russia
- Region: Amur Oblast
- District: Zavitinsky District
- Time zone: UTC+9:00

Ivanovka (Russian: Ивановка) is a rural locality (a selo) in Innokentyevsky Selsoviet of Zavitinsky District, Amur Oblast, Russia. The population was 146 as of 2018. There are 4 streets.

== Geography ==
Ivanovka is located 29 km southwest of Zavitinsk (the district's administrative centre) by road. Innokentyevka is the nearest rural locality.
