= Ivanovka, Nizhnemedveditsky Selsoviet, Kursky District, Kursk Oblast =

Rural locality in Kursk Oblast, Russia

Ivanovka Ивановка
- Village
- Interactive map of Ivanovka
- Location of Ivanovka Ivanovka (Kursk Oblast)
- Coordinates: 51°57′03″N 36°02′02″E
- Country: Russia
- Federal subject: Kursk Oblast
- Administrative district: Kursky District
- SelsovietSelsoviet: Nizhnemedveditsky

Population (2010 Census)
  - Total: 42
  - Estimate (2010): 42 (0%)

Municipal status
  - Municipal district: Kursky Municipal District
  - Rural settlement: Nizhnemedveditsky Selsoviet Rural Settlement
- Time zone: UTC+3 (MSK)
- Postal code: 305505
- Dialing code: +7 4712
- OKTMO ID: 38620448166
- Website: nmedvedica.rkursk.ru

Ivanovka (Russian: Ивановка) is a rural locality (Russian: деревня, lit. 'village') located in Nizhnemedveditsky Selsoviet Rural Settlement, within Kursky District, of Kursk Oblast, Russia. According to census it population is: 42 (2010 census); 69 (2002 census);

== Geography ==
The village is located on the Bolshaya Kuritsa River (a right tributary of the Seym River), 102 km from the Russia–Ukraine border, 26 km north-west of Kursk and 11 km from the selsoviet center – Verkhnyaya Medveditsa.

Climate

Ivanovka has a warm-summer humid continental climate (Dfb in the Köppen climate classification).

== Transport ==
Ivanovka is located 3 km from the federal route M-2 Crimea Highway (a part of the European route E105), on the road of intermunicipal significance 38Н-235 ("Crimea Highway" – 1st Shemyakino – Ivanovka), 20 km from the nearest railway halt 521 km (railway line Oryol – Kursk).

The rural locality is situated 27 km from Kursk Vostochny Airport, 149 km from Belgorod International Airport and 220 km from Voronezh Peter the Great Airport.
