= Ivanovka, Yegoryevsky District, Altai Krai =

Ivanovka Ивановка
- Selo
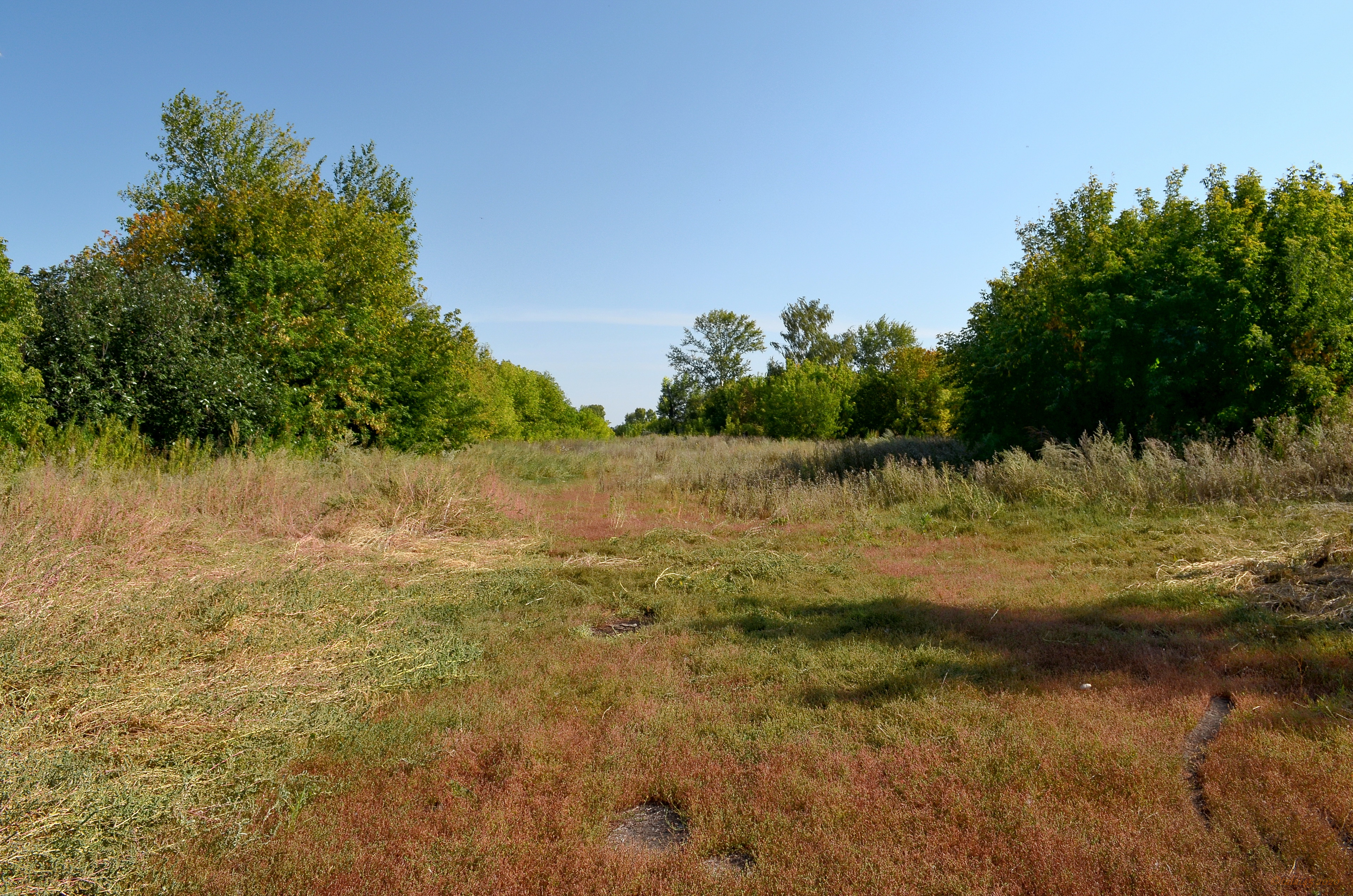

- Location within Altai Krai Location within Russia
- Coordinates: 51°51′N 81°11′E
- Country: Russia
- Region: Altai Krai
- District: Yegoryevsky District
- Time zone: UTC+7:00

Ivanovka (Russian: Ивановка) is a rural locality (a selo) in Pervomaysky Selsoviet, Yegoryevsky District, Altai Krai, Russia. The population was 1 as of 2012. There is 1 street.

== Geography ==
Ivanovka is located 48 km northeast of Novoyegoryevskoye (the district's administrative centre) by road. Tishinka is the nearest rural locality.
