= Ivanovka, Kuyurgazinsky District, Republic of Bashkortostan =

Ivanovka Ивановка
- Village
- Location within Bashkortostan Location within Russia
- Coordinates: 52°45′N 55°43′E
- Country: Russia
- Region: Bashkortostan
- District: Kuyurgazinsky District
- Time zone: UTC+5:00

Ivanovka (Russian: Ивановка) is a rural locality (a village) in Shabagishsky Selsoviet, Kuyurgazinsky District, Bashkortostan, Russia. The population was 107 as of 2010. There are 6 streets.

== Geography ==
Ivanovka is located 10 km southeast of Yermolayevo (the district's administrative centre) by road.
