= Ivanovka, Kalmansky District, Altai Krai =

Ivanovka Ивановка
- Settlement
- Location within Altai Krai Location within Russia
- Coordinates: 53°00′N 83°11′E
- Country: Russia
- Region: Altai Krai
- District: Kalmansky District
- Time zone: UTC+7:00

Ivanovka (Russian: Ивановка) is a rural locality (a settlement) in Shilovsky Selsoviet, Kalmansky District, Altai Krai, Russia. The population was 89 as of 2013. There are 2 streets.

== Geography ==
Ivanovka is located 33 km northwest of Kalmanka (the district's administrative centre) by road. Novobarnaulka is the nearest rural locality.
