= Ivanovka, Starooskolsky District, Belgorod Oblast =

Ivanovka Ивановка
- Selo
- Location within Belgorod Oblast Location within Russia
- Coordinates: 51°05′N 37°51′E
- Country: Russia
- Region: Belgorod Oblast
- District: Starooskolsky District
- Time zone: UTC+3:00

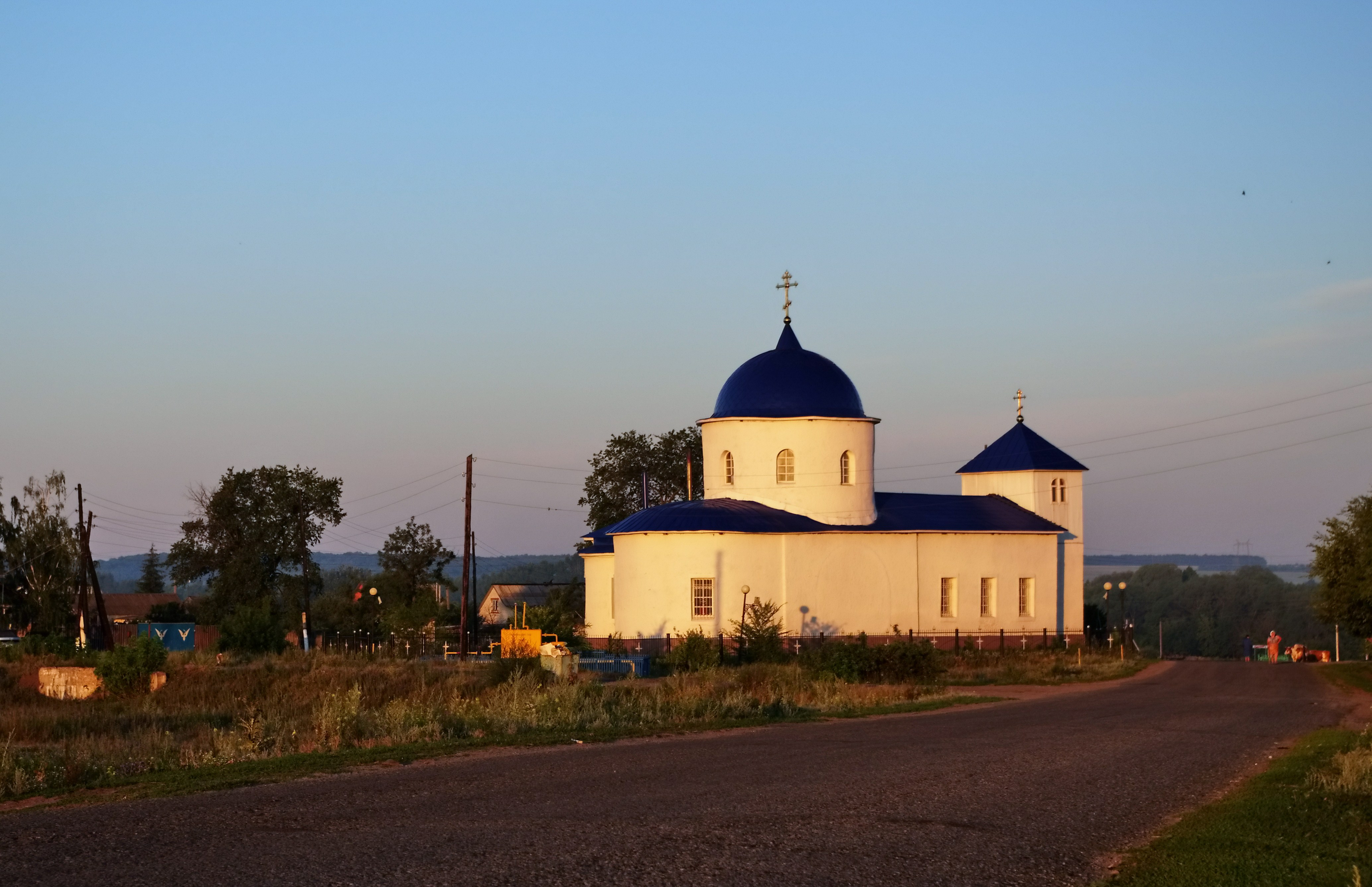

Ivanovka (Russian: Ивановка) is a rural locality (a selo) in Starooskolsky District, Belgorod Oblast, Russia. The population was 579 as of 2010. There are 4 streets.

== Geography ==
Ivanovka is located 36 km south of Stary Oskol (the district's administrative centre) by road. Prioskolye is the nearest rural locality.
