= Ivanovka, Khaybullinsky District, Republic of Bashkortostan =

Ivanovka Ивановка
- Selo
- Location within Bashkortostan Location within Russia
- Coordinates: 51°58′N 57°53′E
- Country: Russia
- Region: Bashkortostan
- District: Khaybullinsky District
- Time zone: UTC+5:00

Ivanovka (Russian: Ивановка) is a rural locality (a selo) and the administrative centre of Ivanovsky Selsoviet, Khaybullinsky District, Bashkortostan, Russia. The population was 877 as of 2010. There are 5 streets.

== Geography ==
Ivanovka is located 33 km northwest of Akyar (the district's administrative centre) by road. Pugachevo is the nearest rural locality.
