= Ivanovka, Vyaznikovsky District, Vladimir Oblast =

Ivanovka Ивановка
- Village
- Location within Vladimir Oblast Location within Russia
- Coordinates: 56°16′N 42°10′E
- Country: Russia
- Region: Vladimir Oblast
- District: Vyaznikovsky District
- Time zone: UTC+3:00

Ivanovka (Russian: Ивановка) is a rural locality (a village) in Gorod Vyazniki, Vyaznikovsky District, Vladimir Oblast, Russia. The population was 7 as of 2010.

== Geography ==
Ivanovka is located 4 km north of Vyazniki (the district's administrative centre) by road. Zolotaya Griva is the nearest rural locality.
