= Mikhaylovka, Gafuriysky District, Republic of Bashkortostan =

Mikhaylovka Михайловка
- Village
- Location within Bashkortostan Location within Russia
- Coordinates: 54°07′N 56°34′E
- Country: Russia
- Region: Bashkortostan
- District: Gafuriysky District
- Time zone: UTC+5:00

Mikhaylovka (Russian: Михайловка) is a rural locality (a village) in Burlinsky Selsoviet, Gafuriysky District, Bashkortostan, Russia. The population was 3 as of 2010. There is 1 street.

== Geography ==
Mikhaylovka is located 46 km north of Krasnousolsky (the district's administrative centre) by road. Yuzimyanovo is the nearest rural locality.
