= Mikhail Popkov =

Russian serial killer and rapist (born 1964)

- Born: Mikhail Viktorovich Popkov; 7 March 1964 (age 62); Norilsk, Krasnoyarsk Krai, Russian SFSR, USSR
- Other names: The Werewolf; The Angarsk Maniac; The Wednesday Murderer
- Motive: Hatred of prostitutes Misogyny; Sexual sadism
- Penalty: Life imprisonment (x2) plus 19 years and 8 months

Details
- Victims: 91+
- Span of crimes: 1992–2011
- Country: Russia
- States: Irkutsk Oblast; Primorsky Krai
- Weapons: Screwdriver, knife, axe, rope, hammer
- Date apprehended: 23 June 2012

Mikhail Viktorovich Popkov (Russian: Михаи́л Ви́кторович Попко́в; born 7 March 1964) is a Russian serial killer, rapist, and necrophile who committed the sexual assault and murder of eighty-seven girls and women between 1992 and 2011 in Angarsk, Irkutsk, in Siberia, and Vladivostok in the Russian Far East, although he has confessed to and is suspected of at least ninety in total. He is known as "the Werewolf" and "the Angarsk Maniac" for the particularly brutal nature of his crimes; he would extensively mutilate the bodies of his victims and perform sexual acts on them. Popkov was also known as "the Wednesday Murderer" because most of his victims' bodies were found on Wednesdays. He is the single most prolific serial killer in Russian history.

Popkov, a former police officer and security guard, was convicted of 22 murders in 2015 and sentenced to life imprisonment, and confessed to an additional 59 three years later; on December 10, 2018, he was convicted for 56 of the 59 additional killings, three of which the police could not find sufficient evidence with which to be proven, and given a second life sentence. There were calls for Popkov to be executed, but this was unavailable as capital punishment in Russia is subject to a formal moratorium.

== Life ==
Mikhail Popkov was born on 7 March 1964 in Norilsk, Krasnoyarsk Krai, in what was then the Russian Soviet Federative Socialist Republic, and soon moved with his parents to Angarsk, Irkutsk Oblast. Popkov worked as a police officer in the Irkutsk region, and by the time of his capture had also spent time as a security guard at the Angarsk Oil and Chemical Company, as well as at a private firm. He was at the time married to his wife Elena and had a daughter named Ekaterina.

== Crimes ==
From 1992 to 2011, Popkov killed dozens of women between the ages of 19 and 50, as well as one policeman, in his home city of Angarsk and other locations within the Irkutsk region. He stated that he "wanted to cleanse the streets of prostitutes," and that "committing the murders, I was guided by my inner convictions." He also falsely accused his wife of infidelity, and claimed that his brutality was the result of this imagined betrayal. Angarsk psychiatrist Alexander Grishin speculates that growing up with an alcoholic, allegedly abusive mother likely contributed.

Popkov targeted women who did things he considered immoral, such as going to parties without male chaperones. His usual tactic for luring victims was to go out at night wearing his police uniform, find a potential victim, and offer them a lift in his police car. Instead, he drove to remote locations where he forced them to disrobe, killed them with tools including knives, axes, baseball bats, and screwdrivers, and raped their bodies. He also mutilated them so severely that Russian media nicknamed him "the Werewolf" and "the Angarsk Maniac".

== Investigation, arrest, trial, and sentencing ==
Russian police were involved in the search for one perpetrator as during this time (mid-1990s) the slain women were discovered killed by similar methods. Despite extensive inquiries and testimonies from surviving victims, Popkov eluded police for two decades. However, investigators discovered a pattern: tracks from a Lada 4×4, an off-road vehicle used by law enforcement, were found at numerous crime scenes. DNA testing of 3,500 current and former policemen in Irkutsk in 2012 facilitated Popkov's capture that same year. In January 2015, he was sentenced to life in prison for 22 murders and two attempted murders.

== Subsequent confessions ==
Two years later, Popkov confessed to 59 additional killings, a total victim count which surpasses that of more notorious Russian serial killers such as Andrei Chikatilo and Alexander Pichushkin. On 10 December 2018, after a trial in the regional court of Irkutsk in Siberia, he was convicted of 56 further murders; the three remaining alleged killings could not be confirmed due to lack of evidence. He was given a second life sentence.

In July 2020, Popkov confessed to two more killings, bringing the total number of admitted victims to 83.

He was found guilty of two killings on 4 June 2021, and sentenced to an additional 9 years and 8 months in prison. In November 2023, he was found guilty of three more killings and sentenced to a further 10 years.

== See also ==
- List of Russian serial killers
- List of serial killers by number of victims
