= Ivanovka, Kabansky District, Republic of Buryatia =

Ivanovka Ивановка
- Settlement
- Location within Republic of Buryatia Location within Russia
- Coordinates: 51°41′N 105°43′E
- Country: Russia
- Region: Republic of Buryatia
- District: Kabansky District
- Time zone: UTC+8:00

Ivanovka (Russian: Ивановка) is a rural locality (a settlement) in Kabansky District, Republic of Buryatia, Russia. The population was 51 as of 2010. There are 3 streets.

== Geography ==
Ivanovka is located 82 km southwest of Kabansk (the district's administrative centre) by road. Klyuyevka is the nearest rural locality.
