= Ivanovka, Zeysky District, Amur Oblast =

Ivanovka Ивановка
- Selo
- Location within Amur Oblast Location within Russia
- Coordinates: 53°37′N 126°43′E
- Country: Russia
- Region: Amur Oblast
- District: Zeysky District
- Time zone: UTC+9:00

Ivanovka (Russian: Ивановка) is a rural locality (a selo) and the administrative center of Ivanovsky Selsoviet of Zeysky District, Amur Oblast, Russia. The population was 297 as of 2018. There are 12 streets.

== Geography ==
Ivanovka is located on the left bank of the Urkan River, 46 km southwest of Zeya (the district's administrative centre) by road. Ovsyanka is the nearest rural locality.
