= Ivanovka, Dobryanka, Perm Krai =

Ivanovka Ивановка
- Village
- Location within Perm Krai Location within Russia
- Coordinates: 58°15′N 56°24′E
- Country: Russia
- Region: Perm Krai
- District: Dobryansky District
- Time zone: UTC+5:00

Ivanovka (Russian: Ивановка) is a rural locality (a village) in Dobryansky District, Perm Krai, Russia. The population was 38 as of 2010.
