= Ivanovka, Kyakhtinsky District, Republic of Buryatia =

Ivanovka Ивановка
- Selo
- Location within Republic of Buryatia Location within Russia
- Coordinates: 50°11′N 107°14′E
- Country: Russia
- Region: Republic of Buryatia
- District: Kyakhtinsky District
- Time zone: UTC+8:00

Ivanovka (Russian: Ивановка) is a rural locality (a selo) in Kyakhtinsky District, Republic of Buryatia, Russia. The population was 177 as of 2010. There is 1 street.

== Geography ==
Ivanovka is located 76 km southeast of Kyakhta (the district's administrative centre) by road. Enkhe-Tala is the nearest rural locality.
