= Ivanovka, Sterlibashevsky District, Republic of Bashkortostan =

Ivanovka Ивановка
- Village
- Location within Bashkortostan Location within Russia
- Coordinates: 53°24′N 55°02′E
- Country: Russia
- Region: Bashkortostan
- District: Sterlibashevsky District
- Time zone: UTC+5:00

Ivanovka (Russian: Ивановка) is a rural locality (a village) in Aydaralinsky Selsoviet, Sterlibashevsky District, Bashkortostan, Russia. The population was 2 as of 2010. There is 1 street.

== Geography ==
Ivanovka is located 18 km southwest of Sterlibashevo (the district's administrative center) by road Rodionovka is the nearest rural locality.
