= Ivanovka, Yelansky District, Volgograd Oblast =

Ivanovka Ивановка
- Selo
- Location within Volgograd Oblast Location within Russia
- Coordinates: 50°49′N 43°39′E
- Country: Russia
- Region: Volgograd Oblast
- District: Yelansky District
- Time zone: UTC+4:00

Ivanovka (Russian: Ивановка) is a rural locality (a selo) and the administrative center of Ivanovskoye Rural Settlement, Yelansky District, Volgograd Oblast, Russia. The population was 244 as of 2010.

== Geography ==
Ivanovka is located on Khopyorsko-Buzulukskaya Plain, on the bank of the Yelan River, 20 km southwest of Yelan (the district's administrative centre) by road. Trostyanka is the nearest rural locality.
