= Ivanovka, Shelabolikhinsky District, Altai Krai =

Ivanovka Ивановка
- Selo
- Location within Altai Krai Location within Russia
- Coordinates: 53°22′N 82°10′E
- Country: Russia
- Region: Altai Krai
- District: Shelabolikhinsky District
- Time zone: UTC+7:00

Ivanovka (Russian: Ивановка) is a rural locality (a selo) in Verkh-Kuchuksky Selsoviet, Shelabolikhinsky District, Altai Krai, Russia. The population was 265 as of 2013. There are 4 streets.

== Geography ==
Ivanovka is located 35 km west of Shelabolikha (the district's administrative centre) by road. Verkh-Kuchuk is the nearest rural locality.
