= Ivanovka, Rossoshansky District, Voronezh Oblast =

Ivanovka Ивановка
- Selo
- Location within Voronezh Oblast Location within Russia
- Coordinates: 50°00′N 40°01′E
- Country: Russia
- Region: Voronezh Oblast
- District: Rossoshansky District
- Time zone: UTC+3:00

Ivanovka (Russian: Ивановка) is a rural locality (a selo) in Novokalitvenskoye Rural Settlement, Rossoshansky District, Voronezh Oblast, Russia. The population was 353 as of 2010. There are 19 streets.

== Geography ==
Ivanovka is located 56 km southeast of Rossosh (the district's administrative centre) by road. Novaya Kalitva is the nearest rural locality.
