= Ivanovka, Karmaskalinsky District, Republic of Bashkortostan =

Ivanovka Ивановка
- Village
- Location within Bashkortostan Location within Russia
- Coordinates: 54°20′N 56°15′E
- Country: Russia
- Region: Bashkortostan
- District: Karmaskalinsky District
- Time zone: UTC+5:00

Ivanovka (Russian: Ивановка) is a rural locality (a village) in Karlamansky Selsoviet, Karmaskalinsky District, Bashkortostan, Russia. The population was 25 as of 2010. There is one street.

== Geography ==
Ivanovka is located 13 km southeast of Karmaskaly (the district's administrative centre) by road. Sharipkulovo is the nearest rural locality.
