= Ivanovka, Gubkinsky District, Belgorod Oblast =

Ivanovka Ивановка
- Selo
- Location within Belgorod Oblast Location within Russia
- Coordinates: 51°21′N 37°22′E
- Country: Russia
- Region: Belgorod Oblast
- District: Gubkinsky District
- Time zone: UTC+3:00

Ivanovka (Russian: Ивановка) is a rural locality (a selo) in Gubkinsky District, Belgorod Oblast, Russia. The population was 54 as of 2010. There are 6 streets.

== Geography ==
Ivanovka is located 22 km northwest of Gubkin (the district's administrative centre) by road. Panki is the nearest rural locality.
