= Ivanovka, Astrakhan Oblast =

Ivanovka Ивановка
- Selo
- Location within Astrakhan Oblast Location within Russia
- Coordinates: 47°17′N 47°01′E
- Country: Russia
- Region: Astrakhan Oblast
- District: Yenotayevsky District
- Time zone: UTC+4:00

Ivanovka (Russian: Ивановка) is a rural locality (a selo) and the administrative center of Ivanovo-Nikolayvsky Selsoviet of Yenotayevsky District, Astrakhan Oblast, Russia. The population was 731 as of 2010. There are 5 streets.

== Geography ==
Ivanovka is located 7 km north of Yenotayevka (the district's administrative centre) by road. Nikolayevka is the nearest rural locality.
