= Dalnekonstantinovsky District =

Dalnekonstantinovsky District Дальнеконстантиновский район (Russian)
- District
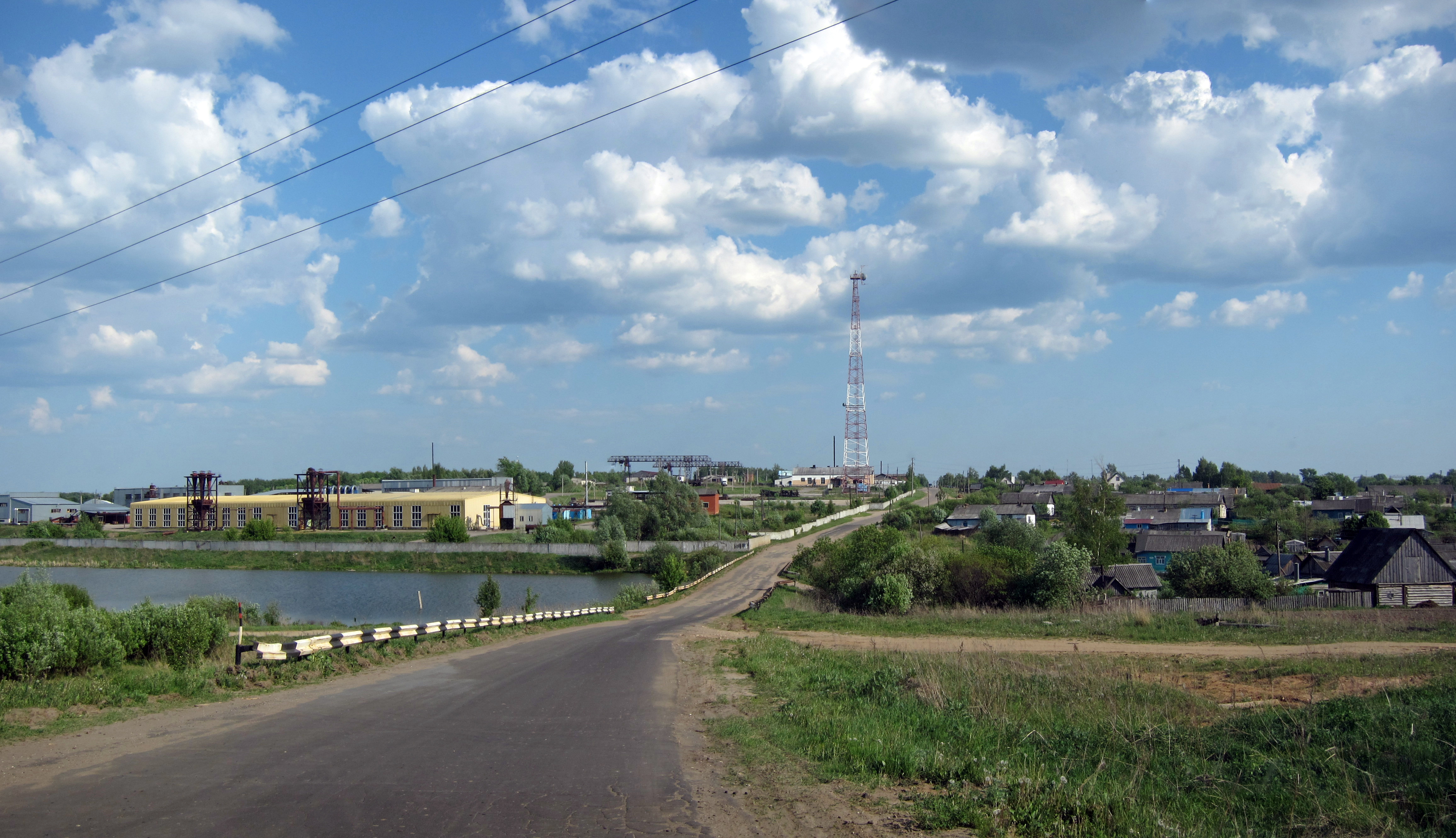
- Road along the station settlement of Surovatikha in Dalnekonstantinovsky District

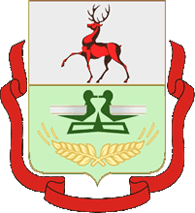
- Coat of arms
- Location of Dalnekonstantinovsky District in Nizhny Novgorod Oblast
- Coordinates: 55°48′37″N 44°06′43″E
- Country: Russia
- Federal subject: Nizhny Novgorod Oblast
- Established: 1929
- Administrative center: Dalneye Konstantinovo

Area
  - Total: 1,377.1 km^{2} (531.7 sq mi)

Population (2010 Census)
  - Total: 22,474
  - Density: 16.320/km^{2} (42.268/sq mi)
  - Urban: 21.3%
  - Rural: 78.7%

Administrative structure
  - Administrative divisions: 1 Work settlements, 9 Selsoviets
  - Inhabited localities: 1 urban-type settlements, 98 rural localities

Municipal structure
  - Municipally incorporated as: Dalnekonstantinovsky Municipal District
  - Municipal divisions: 1 urban settlements, 9 rural settlements
- Time zone: UTC+3 (MSK)
- OKTMO ID: 22630000
- Website: http://dk.nnov.ru

Dalnekonstantinovsky District (Russian: Дальнеконстанти́новский райо́н) is an administrative district (raion), one of the forty in Nizhny Novgorod Oblast, Russia. Municipally, it is incorporated as Dalnekonstantinovsky Municipal District. It is located in the center of the oblast. The area of the district is 1,377.1 square kilometers (531.7 sq mi). Its administrative center is the urban locality (a work settlement) of Dalneye Konstantinovo. Population: 22,474 (2010 Census); 25,251 (2002 census); 25,481 (1989 Soviet census). The population of Dalneye Konstantinovo accounts for 21.3% of the district's total population.

== History ==
The district was established in 1929.

== Notable residents ==
- Kuzma Alekseyev, leader of Teryukhan unrest in 1806-1810, proclaimed himself a prophet. Known as "Kuzya-the-God", lived in Teryukhan Mordvin village of Makrasha
- Dmitri Kiselev (born 1989 Dalnekonstantinovo), ice dancer
