= Dalneye Konstantinovo =

Dalneye Konstantinovo Дальнее Константиново
- Urban-type settlement
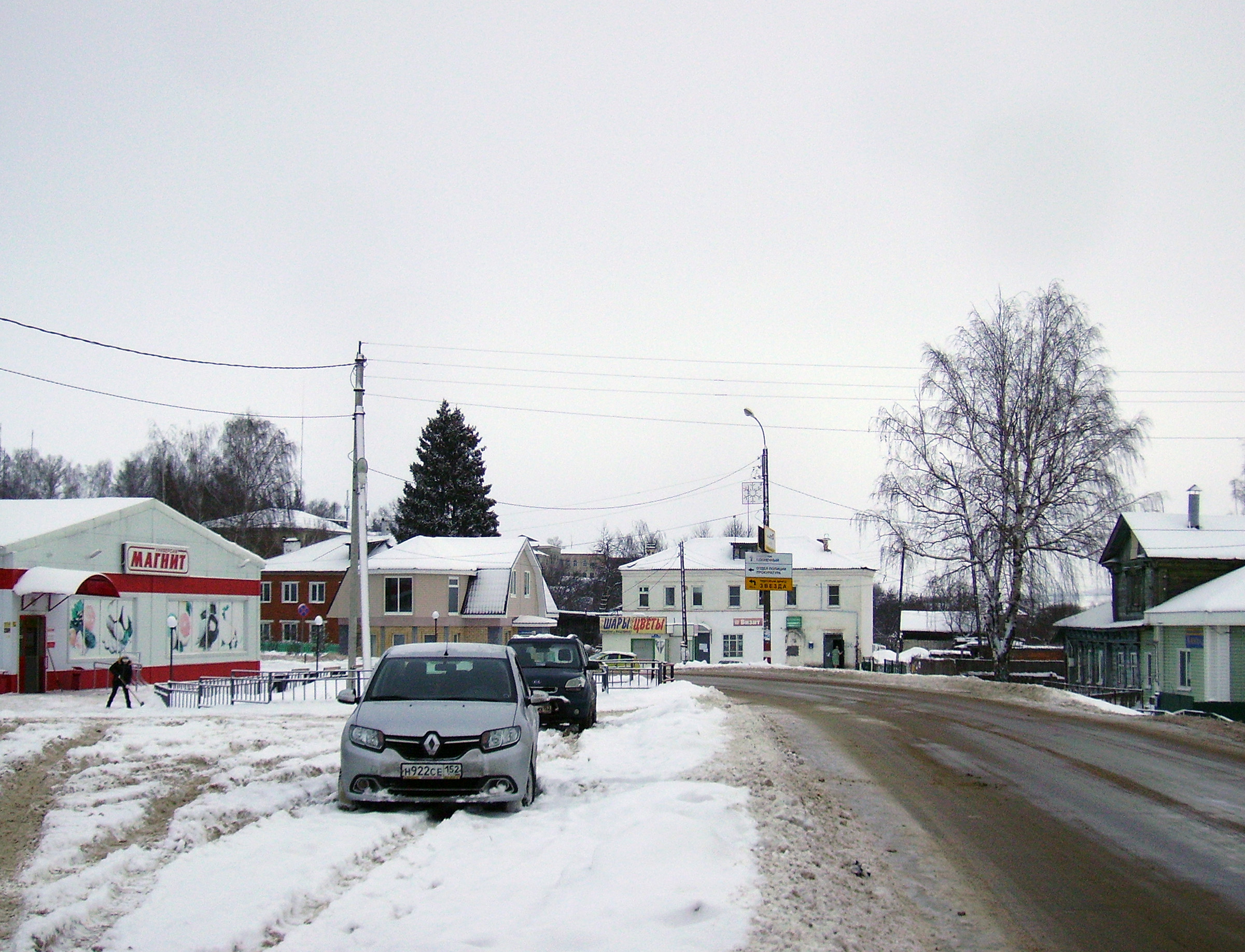
- Interactive map of Dalneye Konstantinovo
- Location of Dalneye Konstantinovo Dalneye Konstantinovo (Nizhny Novgorod Oblast)
- Coordinates: 55.8085°N 44.0919°E
- Country: Russia
- Federal subject: Nizhny Novgorod Oblast
- Administrative district: Dalnekonstantinovsky District
- Elevation: 120 m (390 ft)

Population (2010 Census)
  - Total: 4,777
  - Estimate (2025): 4,772 (−0.1%)
- Time zone: UTC+3 (MSK)
- Postal code: 606310
- OKTMO ID: 22630151051

Dalneye Konstantinovo (Russian: Да́льнее Константи́ново) is an urban locality (an urban-type settlement) in Dalnekonstantinovsky District of Nizhny Novgorod Oblast, Russia. Population: 4,777 (2010 census); 4,986 (2002 census); 5,122 (1989 Soviet census).
