= Angarsky District =

Angarsky District Ангарский район
- District
- Flag Coat of arms
- Location of Angarsky District in Irkutsk Oblast
- Coordinates: 52°34′N 103°49′E
- Country: Russia
- Federal subject: Irkutsk Oblast
- Established: 1997
- Administrative center: Angarsk

Area
  - Total: 1,150 km^{2} (440 sq mi)

Population (2010 Census)
  - Total: 12,010
  - Density: 10.4/km^{2} (27.0/sq mi)
  - Urban: 73.5%
  - Rural: 26.5%

Administrative structure
  - Inhabited localities: 1 cities/towns, 13 rural localities

Municipal structure
  - Municipally incorporated as: Angarskoye Urban Okrug
- Time zone: UTC+8 (MSK+5)
- OKTMO ID: 25703000
- Website: http://www.angarsk-adm.ru

Angarsky District (Russian: Ангарский райо́н) is an administrative district (raion), one of the thirty-three in Irkutsk Oblast, Russia. As a municipal division, it is incorporated as Angarskoye Urban Okrug. It is located in the southwest of the oblast. The area of the district is 1,150 square kilometers (440 sq mi). Its administrative center is the city of Angarsk. Population: 12,010 (2010 Census); 11,574 (2002 Census).

== Administrative and municipal status ==
Within the framework of administrative divisions, Angarsky District is one of the thirty-three in the oblast. The city of Angarsk serves as its administrative center.

As a municipal division, the district has been incorporated as Angarskoye Urban Okrug since January 1, 2015. Prior to that date, the district was incorporated as Angarsky Municipal District, which was subdivided into two urban settlements and two rural settlements.
