= Angarsk =

City in Irkutsk Oblast, Russia

Angarsk Ангарск
- City
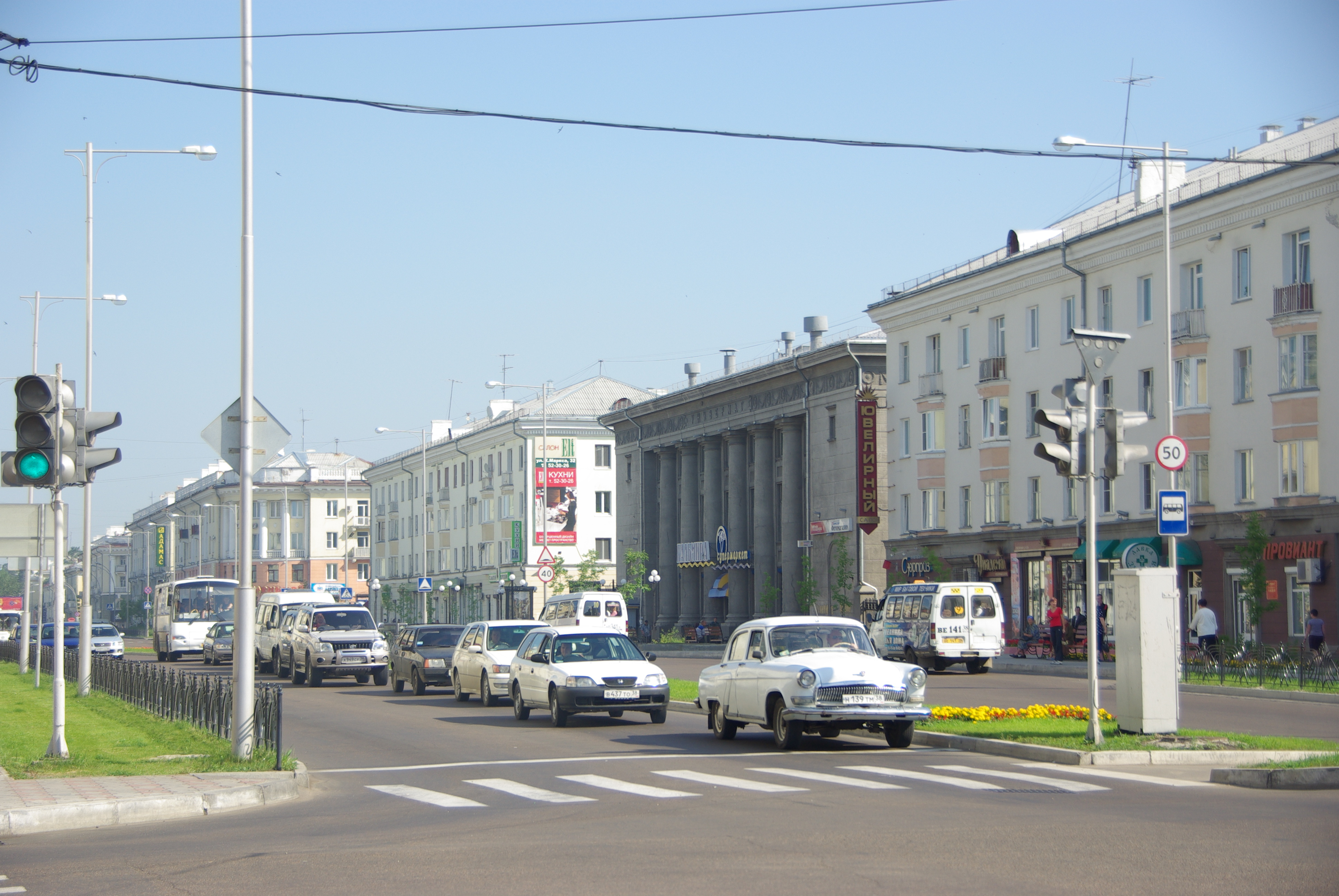
- city center

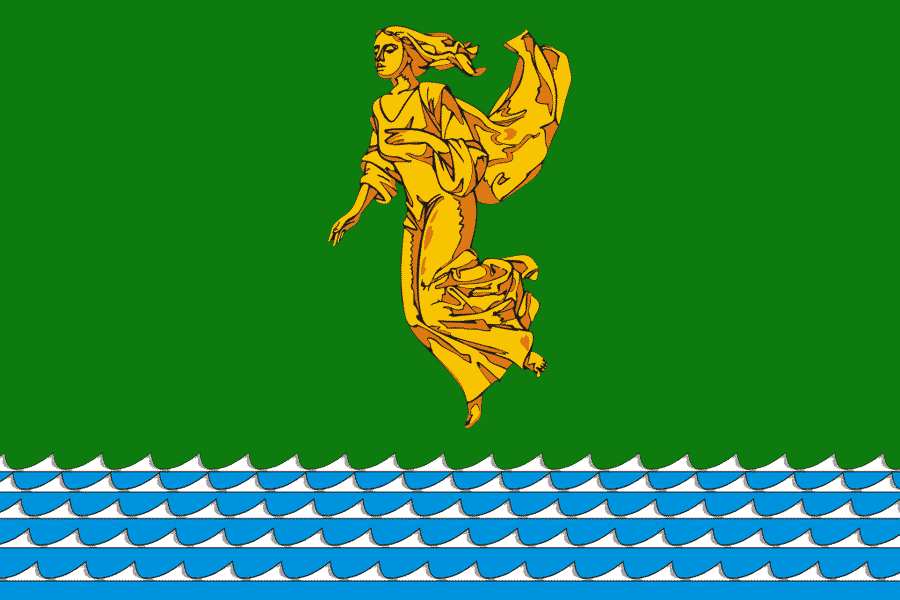
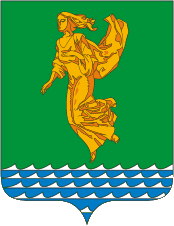
- Flag Coat of arms
- Interactive map of Angarsk
- Location of Angarsk Angarsk (Irkutsk Oblast)
- Coordinates: 52°33′N 103°54′E
- Country: Russia
- Federal subject: Irkutsk Oblast
- Administrative district: Angarsky District
- Founded: 1948
- City status since: May 30, 1951

Government
  - Mayor: Sergey Petrov
- Elevation: 425 m (1,394 ft)

Population (2010 Census)
  - Total: 233,567
  - Estimate (2025): 216,973 (−7.1%)
  - Rank: 83rd in 2010

Administrative status
  - Capital of: Angarsky District

Municipal status
  - Urban okrug: Angarskoye Urban Okrug
  - Capital of: Angarskoye Urban Okrug
- Time zone: UTC+8 (MSK+5)
- Postal codes: 665800, 665801, 665804–665806, 665808, 665809, 665813, 665814, 665816, 665819, 665821, 665824–665836, 665838, 665841
- Dialing code: +7 3955
- OKTMO ID: 25703000001
- Website: angarsk-adm.ru

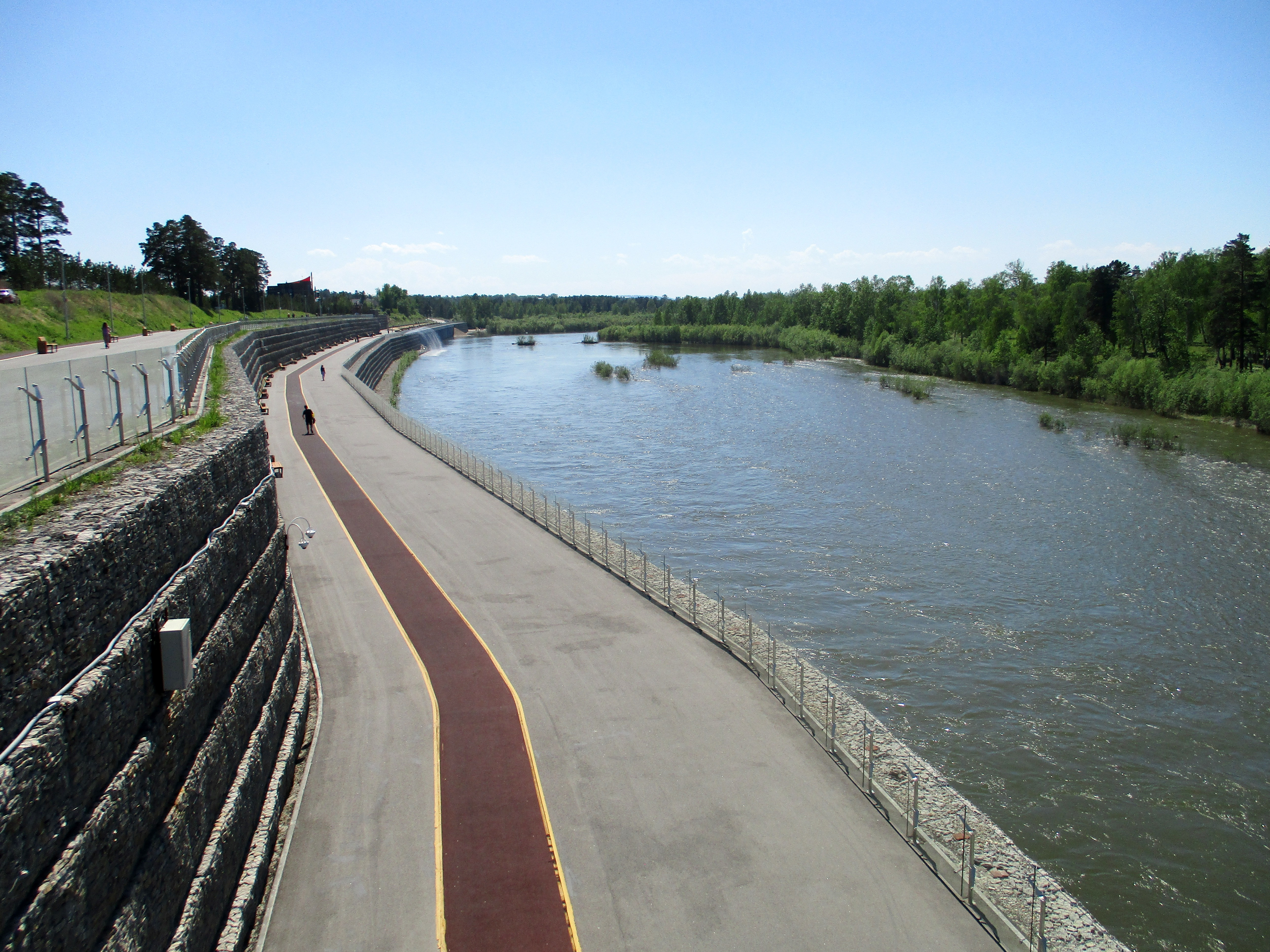
Embankment in Angarsk, Kitoi river

Angarsk (Russian: Ангарск, IPA: [ɐnˈgarsk]) is a city and the administrative center of Angarsky District of Irkutsk Oblast, Russia, located on the Kitoy River, 51 kilometers (32 mi) from Irkutsk, the administrative center of the oblast. Population: 221,296 (2021 census); 233,567 (2010 census); 247,118 (2002 census); 265,835 (1989 Soviet census).

Historical population
Year	Pop.	±%
1959	134,390	—
1970	203,310	+51.3%
1979	238,802	+17.5%
1989	265,835	+11.3%
2002	247,118	−7.0%
2010	233,567	−5.5%
2021	221,296	−5.3%
Source: Census data

== History ==
Angarsk was founded in 1948 as an industrial community and was granted city status on May 30, 1951.

== Administrative and municipal status ==
Within the framework of administrative divisions, Angarsk serves as the administrative center of Angarsky District, to which it is directly subordinated. As a municipal division, the city of Angarsk and thirteen rural localities of Angarsky District are incorporated as Angarskoye Urban Okrug.

== Local government ==
In December 1991, the first elections for the head of the administration of the city of Angarsk took place. Alexander Shevtsov was elected mayor.

On April 1, 1994, Vladimir Nepomnyashchy took over as mayor.

In April 1998, Viktor Novokshenov was elected to govern the city.

On April 7, 2002, the position of the head of the Angarsk municipal entity (AMO) was taken by Yevgeny Kanukhin. On October 9, 2005, he was elected to the position of the head of the administration of the city of Angarsk. Andrei Kozlov got the office of the mayor of AMO (municipal district).

As a result of the elections on December 2, 2007, Leonid Mikhaylov was elected to the position of the head of the administration of the Angarsk urban settlement.

In the summer of 2010, amendments were made to the AMO Charter, introducing the position of a city manager. The mayor of the municipal entity was no longer elected through direct popular vote but rather by a secret ballot among the AMO Duma deputies themselves. This decision caused significant public resonance.

In October 2010, elections were held for the AMO Duma. The AMO deputies elected Vladimir Zhukov, a member of the United Russia party, as the mayor of AMO. Anton Medko was approved as the city manager. Changes were made to the AMO Charter, reinstating direct mayoral elections.

On October 14, 2012, elections were held in Angarsk for the mayor and the deputies of the city Duma. Vladimir Zhukov was elected as the head of the city administration.

Starting from January 1, 2015, the urban settlement of Angarsk, Angarsk municipal entity, and other municipal entities in the region were transformed into the Angarsk urban municipal entity with the status of an urban district. The powers of the previously existing executive and representative authorities were terminated, and they continued to temporarily exercise their powers until the formation of the authorities of the urban district. On April 26, 2015, elections were held in Angarsk for the deputies and mayor of the Angarsk urban district. Sergey Petrov was elected as the head of the urban district. 25 deputies were elected in the first convocation of the Duma of the Angarsk urban municipal entity.

On September 13, 2020, elections were held in Angarsk for the mayor of the Angarsk urban district. Sergey Petrov was re-elected as the head of the urban district.

== Economy ==
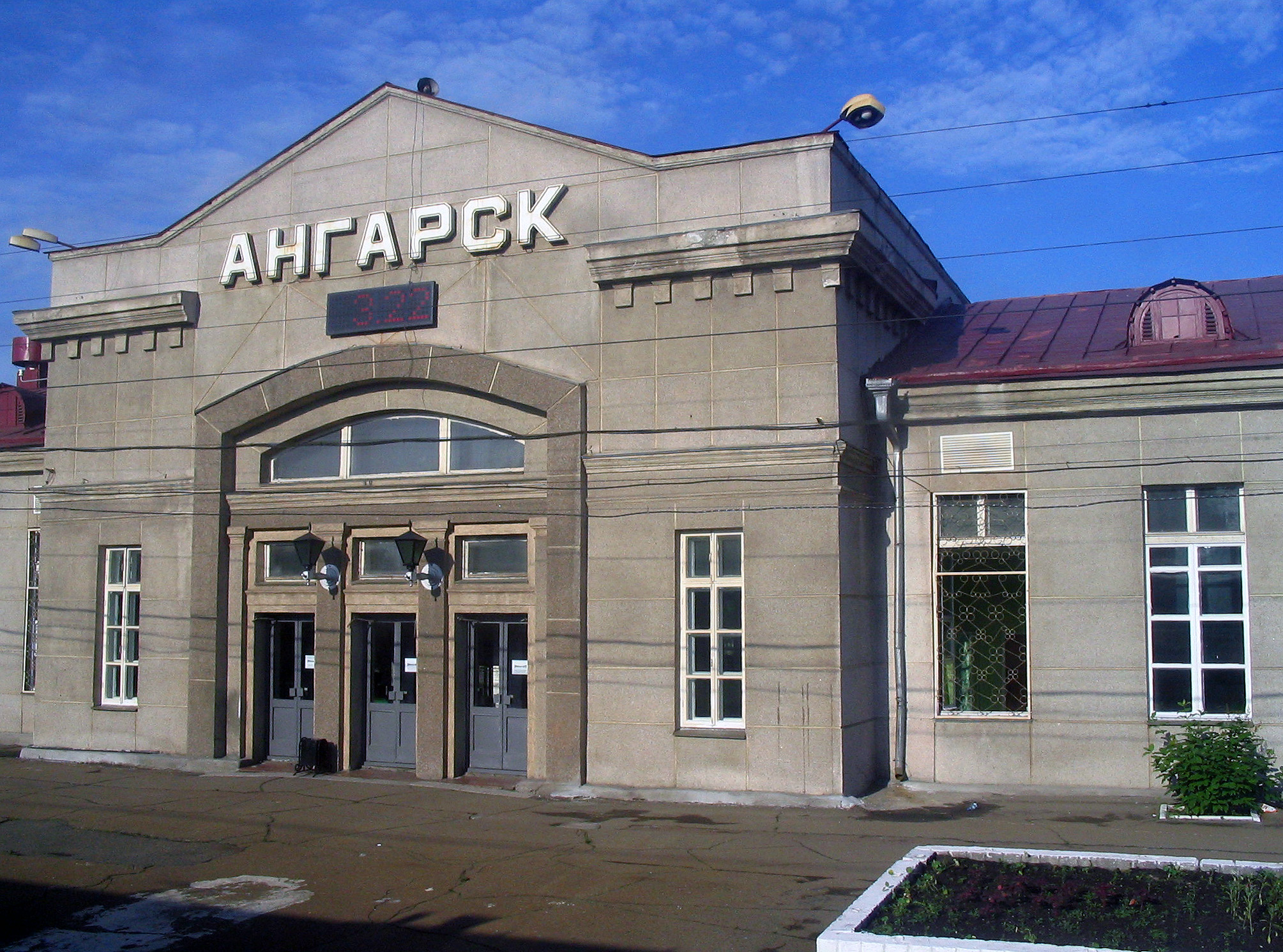
Angarsk railway station on the Trans-Siberian Railway

Angarsk has the largest industrial zone in Asia. It includes Angarsk Petrochemical Complex and Angarsk Electrochemical Combine. Angarsk also hosts a showcase international nuclear fuel cycle center, which will be one of the first Russian enrichment centers to be placed under IAEA safeguards. Angarsk is also the site for a Nuclear Fuel Bank, following a decision by the IAEA in November 2009; working with Russia, IAEA established this bank to supply market priced fuel to member states as protection against possible supply disruptions.

In 2005, Angarsk won the first prize in a nationwide contest for the fastest development of public utilities.

=== Transportation ===
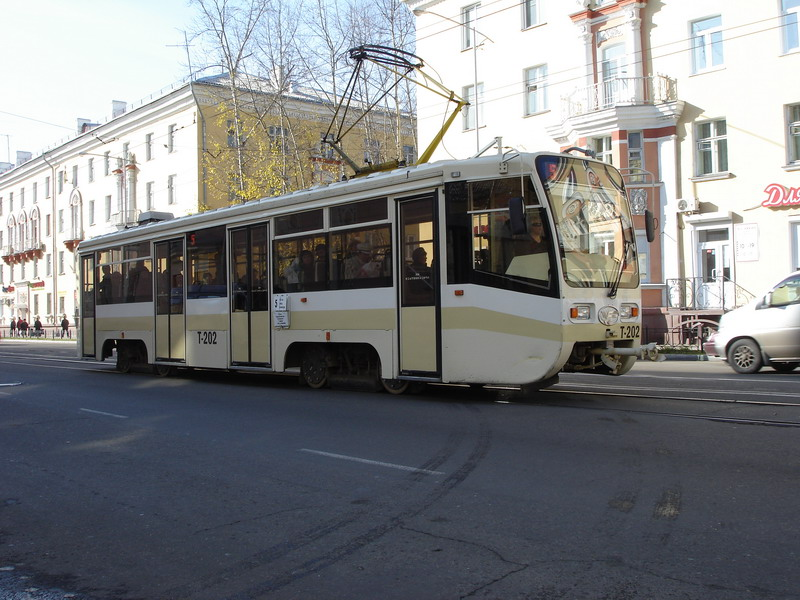
KTM-19 tram

The city is connected by the Trans-Siberian Railway. Trams, buses, and marshrutkas (routed taxis) are the main means of public transportation in the city.

== Culture and education ==
The city is home to the Angarsk Museum of Clocks and Watches, the Angarsk Museum of Victory, and the Angarsk State Technical Academy.

== Ecology ==
Angarsk is listed among the cities in Russia with the most unfavorable environmental conditions: as of 2010, it ranked third in Siberia and sixth in Russia. The primary factor contributing to the risk of illness and mortality in Angarsk is air pollution from emissions of several plants, formerly part of the "Angarsknefteorgsintez" association, as well as Power Plants 10, 9, and 1.

== People ==
- Mikhail Popkov (born 1964), one of Russia's most violent serial killers, was born in Norilsk but lived and acted in Angarsk.
- Roman Popov (born 1980), former professional ice hockey player
- Ekaterina Tyryshkina (born 1996), footballer playing for En Avant de Guingamp (women)
- Dmitri Voronkov (born 2000), NHL player for the Columbus Blue Jackets

== Twin towns and sister cities ==
Angarsk is twinned with:

- Mytishchi, Russia
- Jinzhou, China
- Komatsu, Japan
- / Alushta, Ukraine/Russia
