= Administrative divisions of Irkutsk Oblast =

Divisions of Irkutsk Oblast, Russia

Irkutsk Oblast Russia
- Administrative centre: Irkutsk

Administrative structure (as of 2015)
- Districts: 33
- Cities/towns: 22
- Urban-type settlements: 51
- Selsovets: 0

Municipal structure (as of 2002)
- Rural settlements: 1,503 (inhabited); 39 (uninhabited)

Irkutsk Oblast is a federal subject of Russia.

== Administrative and municipal divisions ==
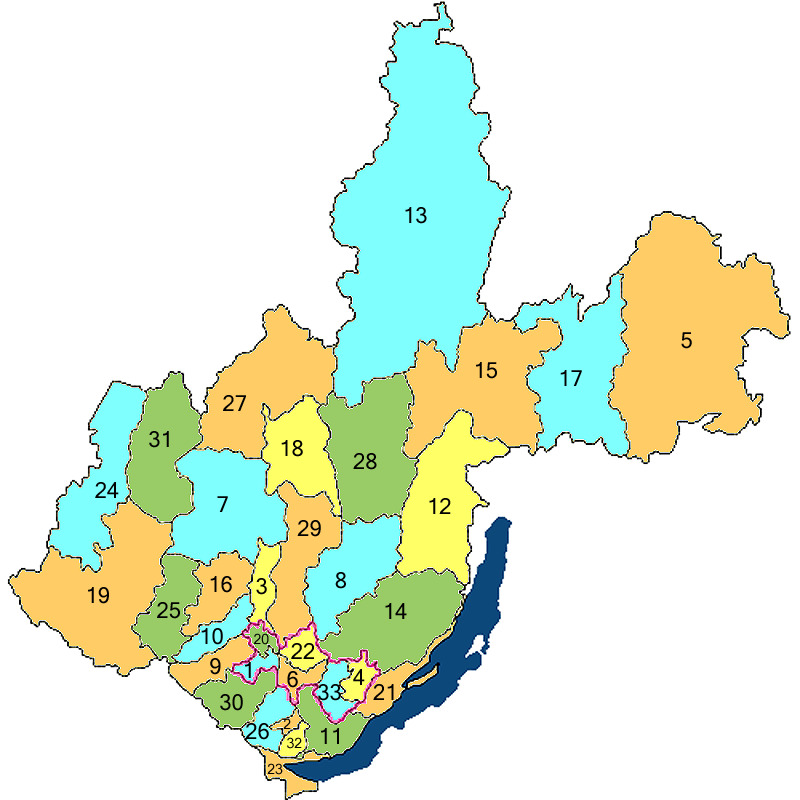
Map of the Irkutsk Oblast, with purple lines of Ust-Orda Buryat Okrug. Numbers correspond to the list at left.

Map

- ✪ - part of Ust-Orda Buryat Okrug (Усть-Орды́нский Буря́тский о́круг)

Map #	Division		Structure		OKATO	OKTMO	Urban-type settlement/ district-level town*
Map #	Division		Administrative	Municipal	OKATO	OKTMO	Urban-type settlement/ district-level town*
	Irkutsk (Иркутск)		city	urban okrug	25 401	25 701	
	↳	Pravoberezhny (Правобережный)		—N/a		—N/a	
	↳	Kirovsky (Кировский)	(under Irkutsk)	(under Pravoberezhny)	25 401	—N/a	
	↳	Kuybyshevsky (Куйбышевский)	(under Irkutsk)	(under Pravoberezhny)	25 401	—N/a	
	↳	Leninsky (Ленинский)	(under Irkutsk)	—N/a	25 401	—N/a	
	↳	Oktyabrsky (Октябрьский)	(under Irkutsk)	—N/a	25 401	—N/a	
	↳	Sverdlovsky (Свердловский)	(under Irkutsk)	—N/a	25 401	—N/a	
	Bratsk (Братск)		city	urban okrug	25 414	25 714	
	↳	Padunsky (Падунский)	(under Bratsk)	—N/a	25 414	—N/a	
	↳	Pravoberezhny (Правобережный)	(under Bratsk)	—N/a	25 414	—N/a	
	↳	Tsentralny (Центральный)	(under Bratsk)	—N/a	25 414	—N/a	
	Zima (Зима)		city	urban okrug	25 420	25 720	
	Sayansk (Саянск)		city	urban okrug	25 426	25 726	
	Svirsk (Свирск)		city	urban okrug	25 427	25 746	
	Tulun (Тулун)		city	urban okrug	25 432	25 732	
	Usolye-Sibirskoye (Усолье-Сибирское)		city	urban okrug	25 436	25 736	
	Ust-Ilimsk (Усть-Илимск)		city	urban okrug	25 438	25 738	
	Cheremkhovo (Черемхово)		city	urban okrug	25 445	25 745	
3	Balagansky (Балаганский)		district		25 201	25 601	Balagansk (Балаганск)
5	Bodaybinsky (Бодайбинский)		district		25 202	25 602	Bodaybo (Бодайбо) town*; Artyomovsky (Артёмовский); Balakhninsky (Балахнинский); Kropotkin (Кропоткин); Mamakan (Мамакан)
2	Angarsky (Ангарский)		district	urban okrug	25 203	25 603	Angarsk (Ангарск) town*
7	Bratsky (Братский)		district		25 204	25 604	Vikhorevka (Вихоревка) town*
1	✪	Alarsky (Аларский)	special district	district	25 205	25 605	
8	Zhigalovsky (Жигаловский)		district		25 206	25 606	Zhigalovo (Жигалово)
4	✪	Bayandayevsky (Баяндаевский)	special district	district	25 207	25 607	
9	Zalarinsky (Заларинский)		district		25 208	25 608	Tyret Pervaya (Тыреть 1-я); Zalari (Залари)
6	✪	Bokhansky (Боханский)	special district	district	25 209	25 609	
10	Ziminsky (Зиминский)		district		25 210	25 610	
11	Irkutsky (Иркутский)		district		25 212	25 612	Bolshaya Rechka (Большая Речка); Listvyanka (Листвянка); Markova (Маркова)
12	Kazachinsko-Lensky (Казачинско-Ленский)		district		25 214	25 614	Kunerma (Кунерма); Magistralny (Магистральный); Ulkan (Улькан)
13	Katangsky (Катангский)		district		25 216	25 616	
14	Kachugsky (Качугский)		district		25 218	25 618	Kachug (Качуг)
15	Kirensky (Киренский)		district		25 220	25 620	Kirensk (Киренск) town*; Alexeyevsk (Алексеевск)
16	Kuytunsky (Куйтунский)		district		25 222	25 622	Kuytun (Куйтун)
17	Mamsko-Chuysky (Мамско-Чуйский)		district		25 224	25 624	Gorno-Chuysky (Горно-Чуйский); Lugovsky (Луговский); Mama (Мама); Sogdiondon (Согдиондон); Vitimsky (Витимский)
18	Nizhneilimsky (Нижнеилимский)		district		25 226	25 626	Zheleznogorsk-Ilimsky (Железногорск-Илимский) town*; Khrebtovaya (Хребтовая); Novaya Igirma (Новая Игирма); Radishchev (Радищев); Rudnogorsk (Рудногорск); Shestakovo (Шестаково); Vidim (Видим); Yangel (Янгель)
19	Nizhneudinsky (Нижнеудинский)		district		25 228	25 628	Alzamay (Алзамай) town*; Nizhneudinsk (Нижнеудинск) town*; Atagay (Атагай); Shumsky (Шумский); Uk (Ук)
20	✪	Nukutsky (Нукутский)	special district	district	25 229	25 629	
21	Olkhonsky (Ольхонский)		district		25 230	25 630	
22	✪	Osinsky (Осинский)	special district	district	25 231	25 631	
23	Slyudyansky (Слюдянский)		district		25 234	25 634	Baykalsk (Байкальск) town*; Slyudyanka (Слюдянка) town*; Kultuk (Култук)
24	Tayshetsky (Тайшетский)		district		25 236	25 636	Tayshet (Тайшет) town*; Biryusinsk (Бирюсинск) town*; Kvitok (Квиток); Novobiryusinsky (Новобирюсинский); Shitkino (Шиткино); Yurty (Юрты)
25	Tulunsky (Тулунский)		district		25 238	25 638	
26	Usolsky (Усольский)		district		25 240	25 640	Belorechensky (Белореченский); Mishelyovka (Мишелёвка); Sredny (Средний); Tayturka (Тайтурка); Telma (Тельма)
27	Ust-Ilimsky (Усть-Илимский)		district		25 242	25 642	Zheleznodorozhny (Железнодорожный)
28	Ust-Kutsky (Усть-Кутский)		district		25 244	25 644	Ust-Kut (Усть-Кут) town*; Yantal (Янталь); Zvyozdny (Звёздный)
29	Ust-Udinsky (Усть-Удинский)		district		25 246	25 646	Ust-Uda (Усть-Уда)
30	Cheremkhovsky (Черемховский)		district		25 248	25 648	Mikhaylovka (Михайловка)
31	Chunsky (Чунский)		district		25 250	25 650	Chunsky (Чунский); Lesogorsk (Лесогорск); Oktyabrsky (Октябрьский)
32	Shelekhovsky (Шелеховский)		district		25 255	25 655	Shelekhov (Шелехов) town*; Bolshoy Lug (Большой Луг)
33	✪	Ekhirit-Bulagatsky (Эхирит-Булагатский)	special district	district	25 257	25 657	

== See also ==
- Administrative divisions of Ust-Orda Buryat Autonomous Okrug
