= Flag of Irkutsk Oblast =

Irkutsk Oblast
- Proportion: 2:3
- Adopted: 25 July 1997
- Design: 3 bands of blue, white, blue; within the white, a black, stylized tiger holding a sable in its mouth, surrounded by branches of cedar

The flag of Irkutsk Oblast depicts three vertical stripes in the ratio 1:2:1: blue on the hoist and fly and white in the middle. Within the white strip, a stylized black tiger-beaver hybrid (the same depicted on the oblast's coat of arms, known as a heraldic babr) is seen holding a red sable in its mouth. These two are surrounded by branches of cedar. The blue represents the waters of Lake Baikal, while white represents purity, goodness, and honesty. The green of the cedar branches represents hope, joy, and abundance.

== Origin of the babr ==
Initially, in Siberia, the word babr (бабр, derived from the Siberian Turkic borrowing of the word in Persian) signified a Siberian tiger, as opposed to the tigr (Russian: тигр) used in western Russia. It first appeared in the coat of arms of Yakutsk under the former, correct interpretation in 1642, later becoming the heraldic symbol of Irkutsk in 1690 after the transfer of the headquarters of the governors of Siberia. However, officials in St. Petersburg were unaware of the word's meaning when modifying the coat of arms of Irkutsk in the late 1870s, and someone assumed it to be a misspelling of the Russian word bobr (бобр), meaning beaver. This then had to be reconciled with pre-existing heraldry depicting a tiger, resulting in a hybrid with the body and face of a tiger but the legs, feet, and tail of a beaver. The error went unnoticed until 1997 when the coat of arms came up for review again, although due to its longstanding use under the erroneous definition, the current babr still more resembles it than the initial correct definition.

== Other flags ==
Flag	Date	Use	Description
	?–present	Flag of Irkutsk city	
	1 January 2008–present	Flag of the Ust-Orda Buryat Okrug	
	18 September 1997–1 January 2008	Flag of the Ust-Orda Buryat Autonomous Okrug	
	17 July 1997–18 September 1997	Flag of the Ust-Orda Buryat Autonomous Okrug	
	2007–present	Flag of Bratsk	
	?–2007	Flag of Bratsk	
	?–present	Flag of Zima	
	?–present	Flag of Sayansk	
	?–present	Flag of Svirsk	
	?–present	Flag of Tulun	
	?–present	Flag of Usolye-Sibirskoye	
	2010?–present	Flag of Ust-Ilimsk	
	?–present	Flag of Cheremkhovo	
	?–present	Flag of Balagansky District	A horizontal bicolor of gold and green, with a double-headed eagle on the top and three triangles in the bottom.
	2004?–present	Flag of Angarsky District	
	?–present	Flag of Bratsky District	
	?–present	Flag of Alarsky District	
	?–present	Flag of Zhigalovsky District	
	?–present	Flag of Bayandayevsky District	
	?–present	Flag of Zalarinsky District	
	?–present	Flag of Bokhansky District	
	?–present	Flag of Ziminsky District	
	?–present	Flag of Irkutsky District	
	?–present	Flag of Katangsky District	
	?–present	Flag of Kazachinsko-Lensky District	
	?–present	Flag of Kachugsky District	
	?–present	Flag of Kirensky District	
	?–present	Flag of Kuytunsky District	
	?–present	Flag of Mamsko-Chuysky District	
	?–present	Flag of Nizhneilimsky District	
	?–present	Flag of Nizhneudinsky District	
	?–present	Flag of Nukutsky District	
	?–present	Flag of Olkhonsky District	
	?–present	Flag of Osinsky District	
	?–present	Flag of Slyudyansky District	
	?–present	Flag of Tayshetsky District	
	?–present	Flag of Tulunsky District	
	?–present	Flag of Usolsky District	
	?–present	Flag of Ust-Ilimsky District	
	?–present	Flag of Ust-Kutsky District	
	?–present	Flag of Cheremkhovsky District	
	?–present	Flag of Chunsky District	
	?–present	Flag of Shelekhovsky District	
		Flag of Ekhirit-Bulagatsky District	
