= Yurty =

Yurty (Russian: Юрты) is the name of several inhabited localities in Russia.

Urban localities

- Yurty, Irkutsk Oblast, a work settlement in Tayshetsky District of Irkutsk Oblast

Rural localities

- Yurty, Nizhny Novgorod Oblast, a settlement in Ognev-Maydansky Selsoviet of Vorotynsky District of Nizhny Novgorod Oblast
- Yurty, Novosibirsk Oblast, a selo in Toguchinsky District of Novosibirsk Oblast
- Yurty, Novolyalinsky District, Sverdlovsk Oblast, a settlement in Novolyalinsky District, Sverdlovsk Oblast
- Yurty, Slobodo-Turinsky District, Sverdlovsk Oblast, a village in Slobodo-Turinsky District, Sverdlovsk Oblast
- Yurty, Tomsk Oblast, a settlement in Kolpashevsky District of Tomsk Oblast
