= Nizhneudinsky =

Nizhneudinsky (masculine), Nizhneudinskaya (feminine), or Nizhneudinskoye (neuter) may refer to:

- Nizhneudinsky District, a district of Irkutsk Oblast, Russia
- Nizhneudinskoye Urban Settlement, a municipal formation which the town of Nizhneudinsk in Nizhneudinsky District of Irkutsk Oblast, Russia is incorporated as
