= Yangel =

Yangel may refer to:

- Mikhail Yangel (1911–1971), Soviet missile designer
- Yangel', a lunar impact crater
- 3039 Yangel, a main-belt asteroid
- Yangel (urban-type settlement), an urban-type settlement in Irkutsk Oblast, Russia
