= Andrei Mozharovsky =

Russian-Ukrainian footballer

Personal information
- Full name: Andrei Sergeyevich Mozharovsky
- Date of birth: 25 July 1994 (age 32)
- Place of birth: Zheleznodoroznhy, Russia
- Height: 1.70 m (5 ft 7 in)
- Position: Midfielder

Youth career
- –2008: FC Arsenal Kharkiv
- 2009: UFK-Olimpik Kharkiv
- 2009–2010: Azovstal Mariupol
- 2010–2011: FC Metalurh Zaporizhzhia

Senior career*
Years	Team	Apps	(Gls)
2012	FC Metalurh-2 Zaporizhzhia	5	(0)
2012–2014	FC Metalurh Zaporizhzhia	0	(0)
2015	FK Tauras Tauragė	17	(2)
2015	FC Baltika-M Kaliningrad		
2016	FC Luki-Energiya Velikiye Luki (amateur)		
2017–2018	FC Luki-Energiya Velikiye Luki	10	(0)
2020–2021	FC Volna Nizhny Novgorod Oblast	11	(0)
- * Club domestic league appearances and goals

Andrei Sergeyevich Mozharovsky (Russian: Андрей Сергеевич Можаровский; born 25 July 1994) is a Russian former football player. He also holds Ukrainian citizenship as Andriy Serhiyovych Mozharovsky (Ukrainian: Андрій Сергійович Можаровський).

== Club career ==
He made his debut in the Russian Professional Football League for FC Luki-Energiya Velikiye Luki on 1 September 2017 in a game against FC Kolomna.
