= Tayshetsky =

Tayshetsky (masculine), Tayshetskaya (feminine), or Tayshetskoye (neuter) may refer to:

- Tayshetsky District, a district of Irkutsk Oblast, Russia
- Tayshetskoye Urban Settlement, a municipal formation which the town of Tayshet in Tayshetsky District of Irkutsk Oblast, Russia is incorporated as
