= Alzamay =

Alzamay Алзамай
- Town
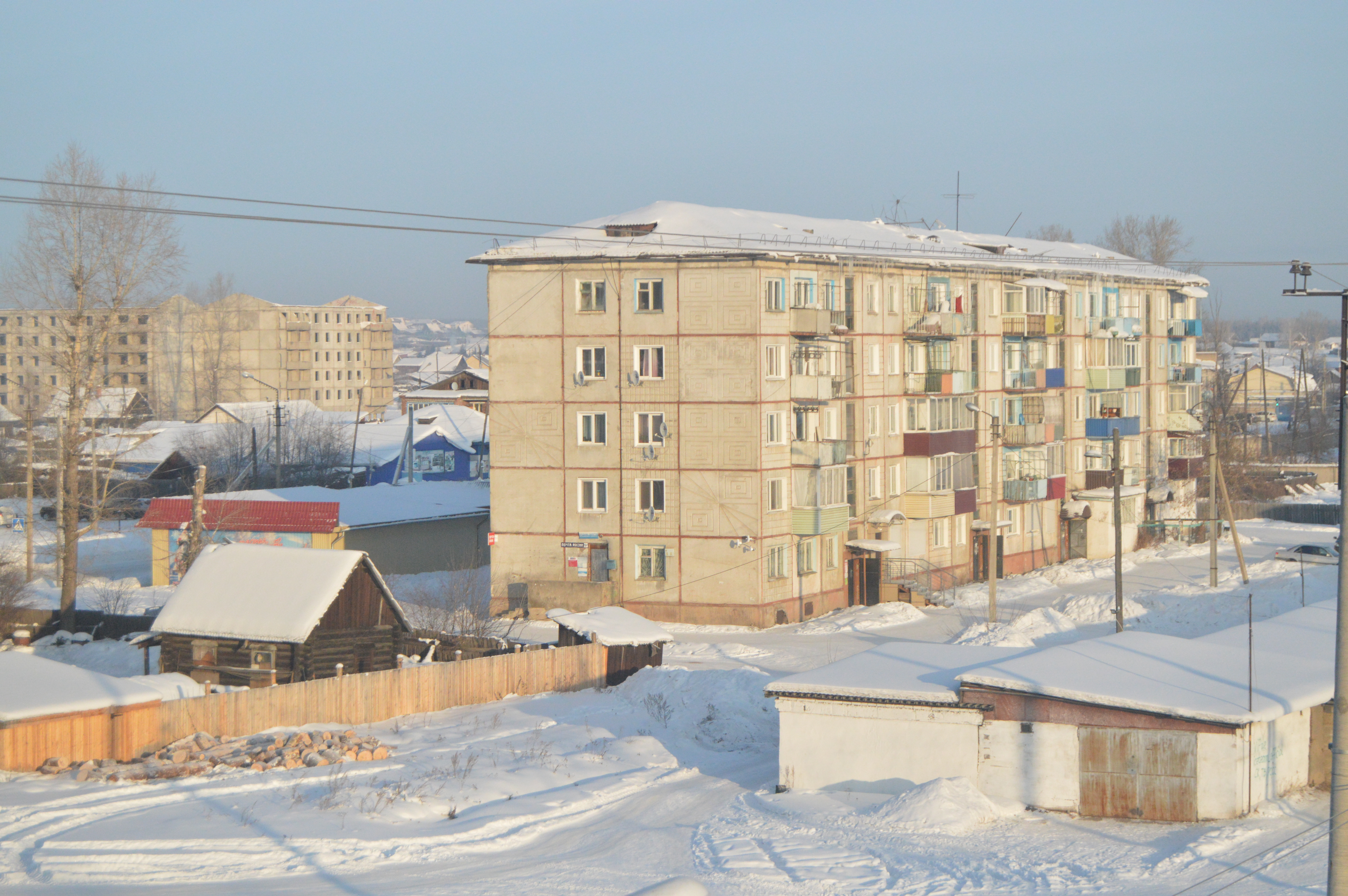

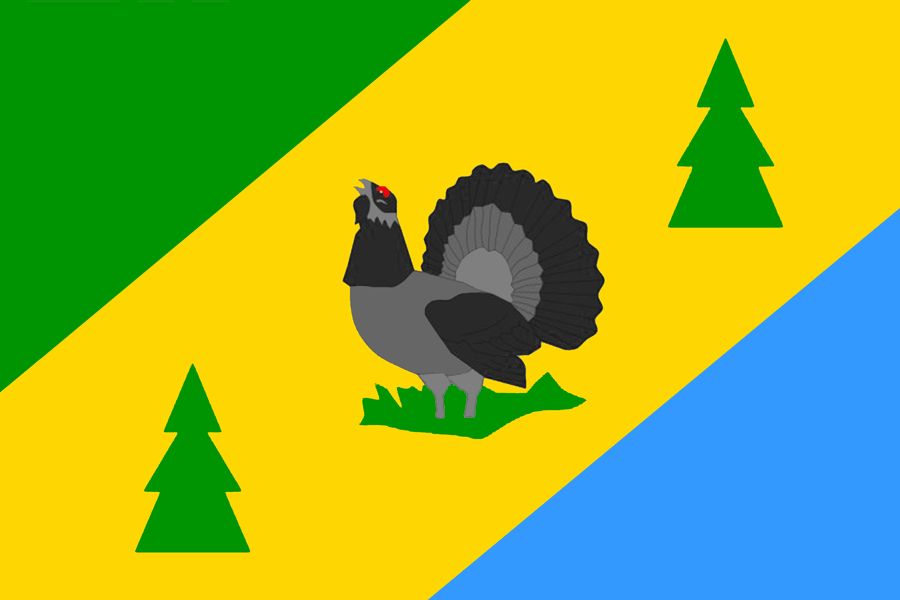
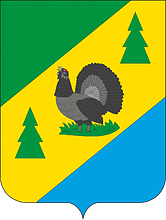
- Flag Coat of arms
- Interactive map of Alzamay
- Location of Alzamay Alzamay (Irkutsk Oblast)
- Coordinates: 55°34′N 98°40′E
- Country: Russia
- Federal subject: Irkutsk Oblast
- Administrative district: Nizhneudinsky District
- Founded: 1899
- Town status since: 1955
- Elevation: 300 m (980 ft)

Population (2010 Census)
  - Total: 6,730
  - Estimate (2021): 5,373 (−20.2%)

Municipal status
  - Municipal district: Nizhneudinsky Municipal District
  - Urban settlement: Alzamayskoye Urban Settlement
  - Capital of: Alzamayskoye Urban Settlement
- Time zone: UTC+8 (MSK+5)
- Postal codes: 665160, 665161
- Dialing code: +7 39517
- OKTMO ID: 25628105001

Alzamay (Russian: Алзама́й, IPA: [ɐlzɐˈmaj]) is a town in Nizhneudinsky District of Irkutsk Oblast, Russia, located on the Toporok River (Angara River's basin) 600 kilometers (370 mi) northwest of Irkutsk, the administrative center of the oblast, and 90 kilometres (56 mi) from Nizhneudinsk, the administrative center of the district. Population: 6,730 (2010 census); 7,383 (2002 census); 9,029 (1989 Soviet census).

== History ==
It was founded in 1899 as a settlement around Alzamay railway station. Town status was granted to it in 1955.

== Administrative and municipal status ==
Within the framework of administrative divisions, Alzamay is subordinated to Nizhneudinsky District. As a municipal division, the town of Alzamay is incorporated within Nizhneudinsky Municipal District as Alzamayskoye Urban Settlement.
