= Shelekhovsky =

Shelekhovsky (masculine), Shelekhovskaya (feminine), or Shelekhovskoye (neuter) may refer to:

- Shelekhovsky District, a district of Irkutsk Oblast, Russia
- Shelekhovskoye Urban Settlement, a municipal formation which the town of Shelekhov in Shelekhovsky District of Irkutsk Oblast, Russia is incorporated as
