= Mikhaylovka, Irkutsk Oblast =

Mikhaylovka Миха́йловка
- Urban-type settlement
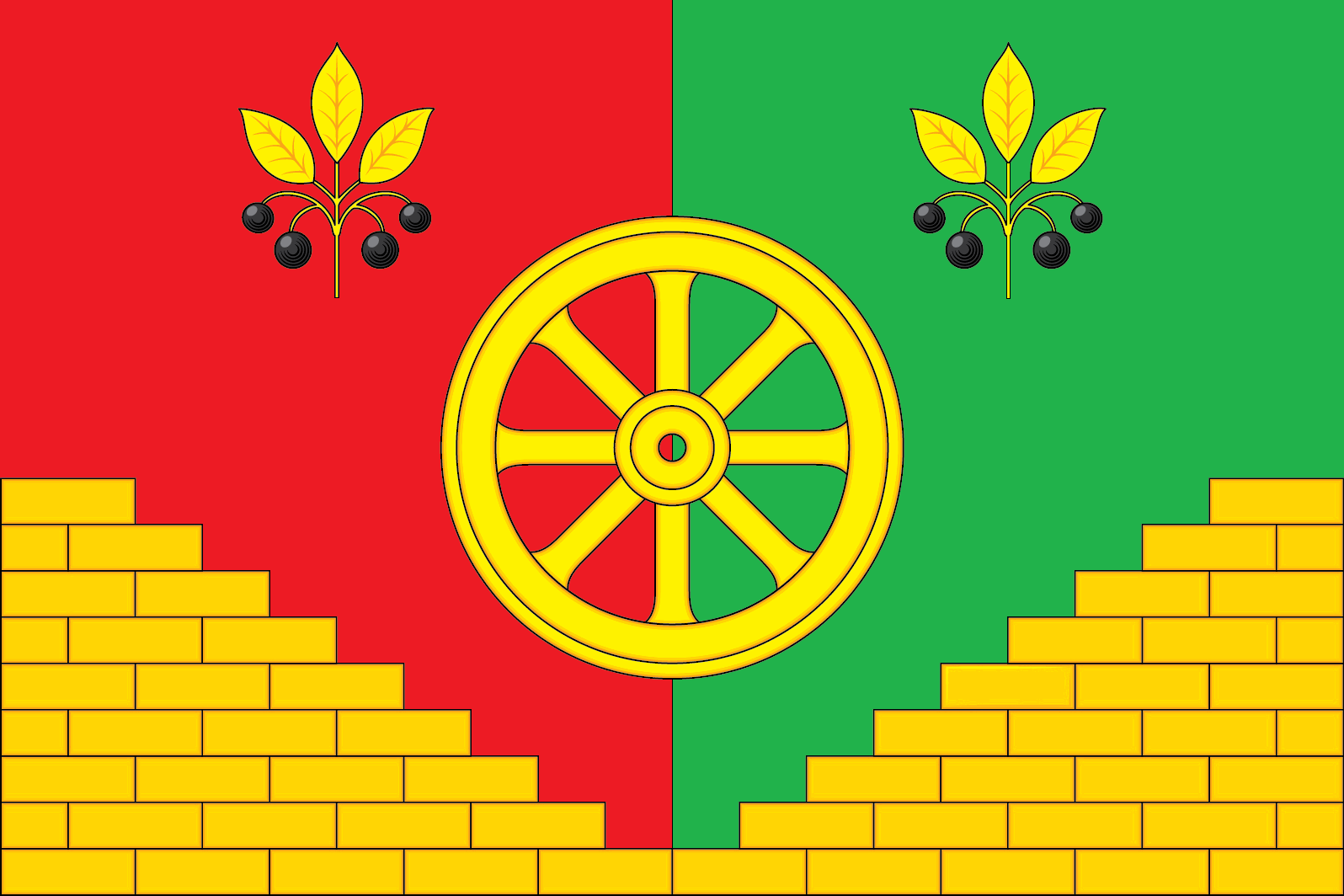
- Flag
- Interactive map of Mikhaylovka
- Location of Mikhaylovka Mikhaylovka (Irkutsk Oblast)
- Coordinates: 52°57′N 103°17′E
- Country: Russia
- Federal subject: Irkutsk Oblast
- Administrative district: Cheremkhovsky District
- Founded: 1902
- Elevation: 550 m (1,800 ft)

Population (2010 Census)
  - Total: 7,827
  - Estimate (2025): 7,322 (−6.5%)
- Time zone: UTC+8 (MSK+5)
- Postal code: 665448
- OKTMO ID: 25648155051

Mikhaylovka (Russian: Миха́йловка) is an urban locality (a work settlement) in Cheremkhovsky District of Irkutsk Oblast, Russia. Population: 7,827 (2010 census); 8,148 (2002 census); 9,381 (1989 Soviet census).
