= Uk (urban-type settlement) =

Uk Ук
- Urban-type settlement
- Interactive map of Uk
- Location of Uk Uk (Irkutsk Oblast)
- Coordinates: 55.0797°N 98.8623°E
- Country: Russia
- Federal subject: Irkutsk Oblast
- Administrative district: Nizhneudinsky District
- Elevation: 505 m (1,657 ft)

Population (2010 Census)
  - Total: 1,827
  - Estimate (2025): 1,208 (−33.9%)
- Time zone: UTC+8 (MSK+5)
- Postal code: 665114
- OKTMO ID: 25628160051

Uk (Russian: Ук) is an urban locality (an urban-type settlement) in Nizhneudinsky District of Irkutsk Oblast, Russia. Population: 1,827 (2010 census); 2,404 (2002 census); 4,902 (1989 Soviet census).
