= Shestakovo =

Shestakovo Шестаково
- Urban-type settlement
- Interactive map of Shestakovo
- Location of Shestakovo Shestakovo (Irkutsk Oblast)
- Coordinates: 56.4941°N 103.9631°E
- Country: Russia
- Federal subject: Irkutsk Oblast
- Administrative district: Nizhneilimsky District
- Elevation: 336 m (1,102 ft)

Population (2010 Census)
  - Total: 772
  - Estimate (2021): 463 (−40%)
- Time zone: UTC+8 (MSK+5)
- Postal code: 665670
- OKTMO ID: 25626170051

Shestakovo (Russian: Шестаково) is an urban locality (an urban-type settlement) in Nizhneilimsky District of Irkutsk Oblast, Russia. Population: 772 (2010 census); 1,113 (2002 census); 1,714 (1989 Soviet census).
