= Atagay =

Atagay Атагай
- Work settlement
- Interactive map of Atagay
- Location of Atagay Atagay (Irkutsk Oblast)
- Coordinates: 55°06′08″N 99°23′07″E
- Country: Russia
- Federal subject: Irkutsk Oblast
- Administrative district: Nizhneudinsky District
- Founded: 1949
- Elevation: 355 m (1,165 ft)

Population (2010 Census)
  - Total: 1,740
  - Estimate (2025): 1,291 (−25.8%)

Municipal status
  - Municipal district: Nizhneudinsky Municipal District
  - Urban settlement: Atagay Urban Settlement
  - Capital of: Atagay Urban Settlement
- Time zone: UTC+8 (MSK+5)
- Postal code: 665121
- OKTMO ID: 25628155051

Atagay (Russian: Атагай) is an urban locality (urban-type settlement) in Nizhneudinsky District of Irkutsk Oblast, Russia. Population: 1,740 (2010 census); 1,853 (2002 census); 4,177 (1989 Soviet census).
