= Novobiryusinsky =

Novobiryusinsky Новобирюсинский
- Urban-type settlement
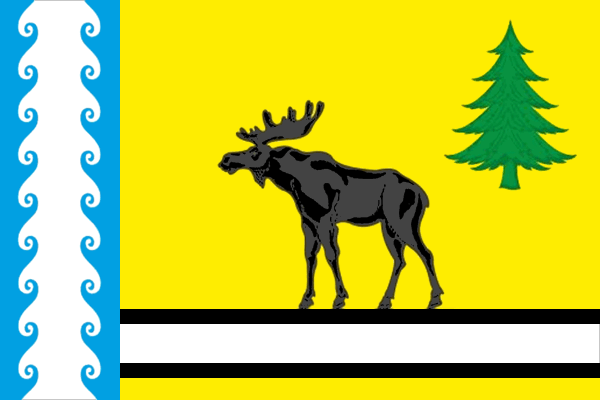
- Flag
- Interactive map of Novobiryusinsky
- Location of Novobiryusinsky Novobiryusinsky (Irkutsk Oblast)
- Coordinates: 56.9572°N 97.7109°E
- Country: Russia
- Federal subject: Irkutsk Oblast
- Administrative district: Tayshetsky District
- Elevation: 203 m (666 ft)

Population (2010 Census)
  - Total: 4,767
  - Estimate (2025): 3,290 (−31%)
- Time zone: UTC+8 (MSK+5)
- Postal code: 665061
- OKTMO ID: 25636162051

Novobiryusinsky (Russian: Новобирюсинский) is an urban locality (an urban-type settlement) in Tayshetsky District of Irkutsk Oblast, Russia. Population: 4,767 (2010 census); 4,984 (2002 census); 4,551 (1989 Soviet census).
