= Novaya Igirma =

Novaya Igirma Новая Игирма
- Urban-type settlement
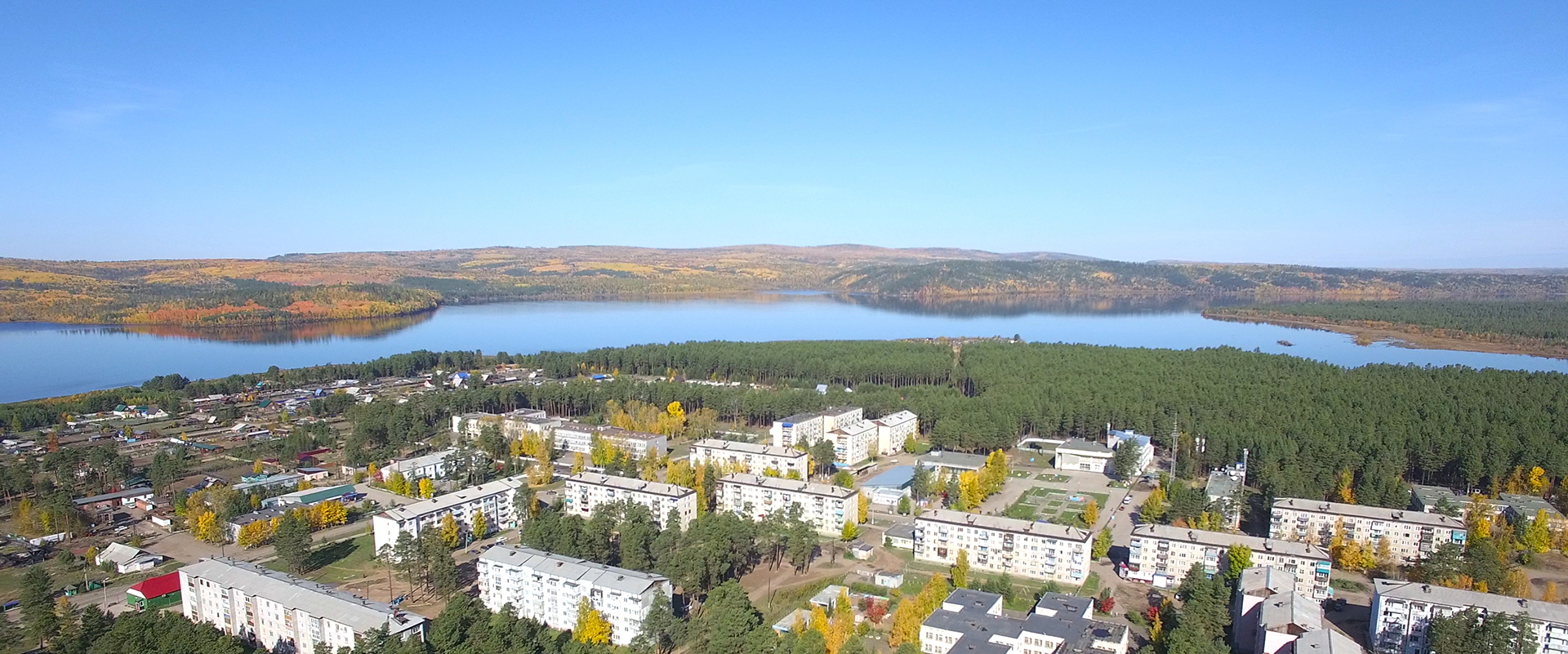
- A general view of Novaya Igirma

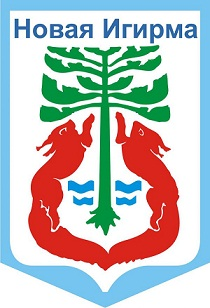
- Coat of arms
- Interactive map of Novaya Igirma
- Location of Novaya Igirma Novaya Igirma (Irkutsk Oblast)
- Coordinates: 57.1396°N 103.9274°E
- Country: Russia
- Federal subject: Irkutsk Oblast
- Administrative district: Nizhneilimsky District
- Founded: 1966
- Elevation: 310 m (1,020 ft)

Population (2010 Census)
  - Total: 10,161
  - Estimate (2025): 8,837 (−13%)
- Time zone: UTC+8 (MSK+5)
- Postal codes: 665684, 665685
- OKTMO ID: 25626160051

Novaya Igirma (Russian: Новая Игирма) is an urban locality (an urban-type settlement) in Nizhneilimsky District of Irkutsk Oblast, Russia. Population: 10,161 (2010 census); 10,965 (2002 census); 13,070 (1989 Soviet census).
