= Kunerma =

Kunerma Кунерма
- Urban-type settlement
- Interactive map of Kunerma
- Location of Kunerma Kunerma (Irkutsk Oblast)
- Coordinates: 55.7607°N 108.4515°E
- Country: Russia
- Federal subject: Irkutsk Oblast
- Administrative district: Kazachinsko-Lensky District
- Founded: 1974
- Elevation: 672 m (2,205 ft)

Population (2010 Census)
  - Total: 59
  - Estimate (2021): 25 (−57.6%)
- Time zone: UTC+8 (MSK+5)
- Postal codes: 666522, 666524
- OKTMO ID: 25614153051

Kunerma (Russian: Кунерма) is an urban locality (an urban-type settlement) in Kazachinsko-Lensky District of Irkutsk Oblast, Russia. Population: 59 (2010 census); 161 (2002 census); 586 (1989 Soviet census).
