= Kvitok =

Kvitok Квиток
- Urban-type settlement
- Interactive map of Kvitok
- Location of Kvitok Kvitok (Irkutsk Oblast)
- Coordinates: 56.0754°N 98.4776°E
- Country: Russia
- Federal subject: Irkutsk Oblast
- Administrative district: Tayshetsky District
- Founded: 1909
- Elevation: 251 m (823 ft)

Population (2010 Census)
  - Total: 2,877
  - Estimate (2025): 2,532 (−12%)
- Time zone: UTC+8 (MSK+5)
- Postal code: 665081
- OKTMO ID: 25636155051

Kvitok (Russian: Квиток) is an urban locality (an urban-type settlement) in Tayshetsky District of Irkutsk Oblast, Russia. Population: 2,877 (2010 census); 3,239 (2002 census); 4,545 (1989 Soviet census).
