= Ulkan =

Ulkan Улькан
- Urban-type settlement
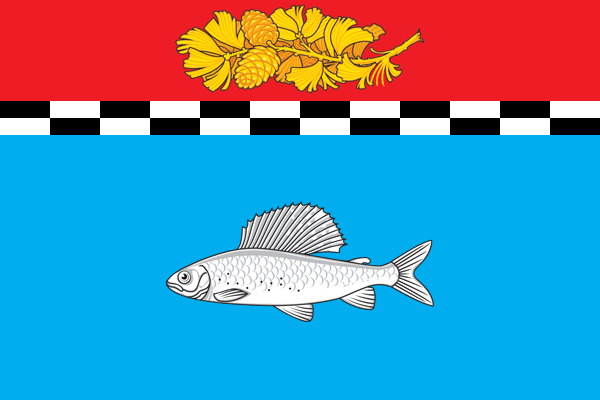
- Flag
- Interactive map of Ulkan
- Location of Ulkan Ulkan (Irkutsk Oblast)
- Coordinates: 55.8980°N 107.8007°E
- Country: Russia
- Federal subject: Irkutsk Oblast
- Administrative district: Kazachinsko-Lensky District
- Elevation: 404 m (1,325 ft)

Population (2010 Census)
  - Total: 5,412
  - Estimate (2025): 3,857 (−28.7%)
- Time zone: UTC+8 (MSK+5)
- Postal code: 666535
- OKTMO ID: 25614158051

Ulkan (Russian: Улькан) is an urban locality (an urban-type settlement) in Kazachinsko-Lensky District of Irkutsk Oblast, Russia. Population: 5,412 (2010 census); 5,853 (2002 census); 9,152 (1989 Soviet census).
