= Markova (urban-type settlement) =

Markova Маркова
- Urban-type settlement
- Interactive map of Markova
- Location of Markova Markova (Irkutsk Oblast)
- Coordinates: 52.2127°N 104.2088°E
- Country: Russia
- Federal subject: Irkutsk Oblast
- Administrative district: Irkutsky District
- Founded: 1820

Population (2010 Census)
  - Total: 9,894
  - Estimate (2025): 39,940 (+303.7%)
- Time zone: UTC+8 (MSK+5)
- Postal code: 664528
- OKTMO ID: 25612163051

Markova (Russian: Маркова) is an urban locality (an urban-type settlement) in Irkutsky District of Irkutsk Oblast, Russia. Population: 9,894 (2010 census); 6,509 (2002 census); 2,569 (1989 Soviet census).
