= Bolshoy Lug =

Bolshoy Lug Большой Луг
- Urban-type settlement
- Flag
- Interactive map of Bolshoy Lug
- Location of Bolshoy Lug Bolshoy Lug (Irkutsk Oblast)
- Coordinates: 52.0776°N 104.0913°E
- Country: Russia
- Federal subject: Irkutsk Oblast
- Administrative district: Shelekhovsky District
- Founded: 1932
- Elevation: 492 m (1,614 ft)

Population (2010 Census)
  - Total: 5,015
  - Estimate (2021): 4,472 (−10.8%)
- Time zone: UTC+8 (MSK+5)
- Postal codes: 666013, 666014
- OKTMO ID: 25655153051

Bolshoy Lug (Russian: Большой Луг) is an urban locality (an urban-type settlement) in Shelekhovsky District of Irkutsk Oblast, Russia. Population: 5,015 (2010 census); 4,508 (2002 census); 5,332 (1989 Soviet census).
