= Shitkino =

Shitkino Шиткино
- Urban-type settlement
- Interactive map of Shitkino
- Location of Shitkino Shitkino (Irkutsk Oblast)
- Coordinates: 56.3708°N 98.3529°E
- Country: Russia
- Federal subject: Irkutsk Oblast
- Administrative district: Tayshetsky District
- Elevation: 221 m (725 ft)

Population (2010 Census)
  - Total: 1,966
  - Estimate (2025): 1,456 (−25.9%)
- Time zone: UTC+8 (MSK+5)
- Postal code: 665042
- OKTMO ID: 25636174051

Shitkino (Russian: Шиткино) is an urban locality (an urban-type settlement) in Tayshetsky District of Irkutsk Oblast, Russia. Population: 1,966 (2010 census); 2,426 (2002 census); 2,947 (1989 Soviet census).
