= Telma (urban-type settlement) =

Telma Тельма
- Urban-type settlement
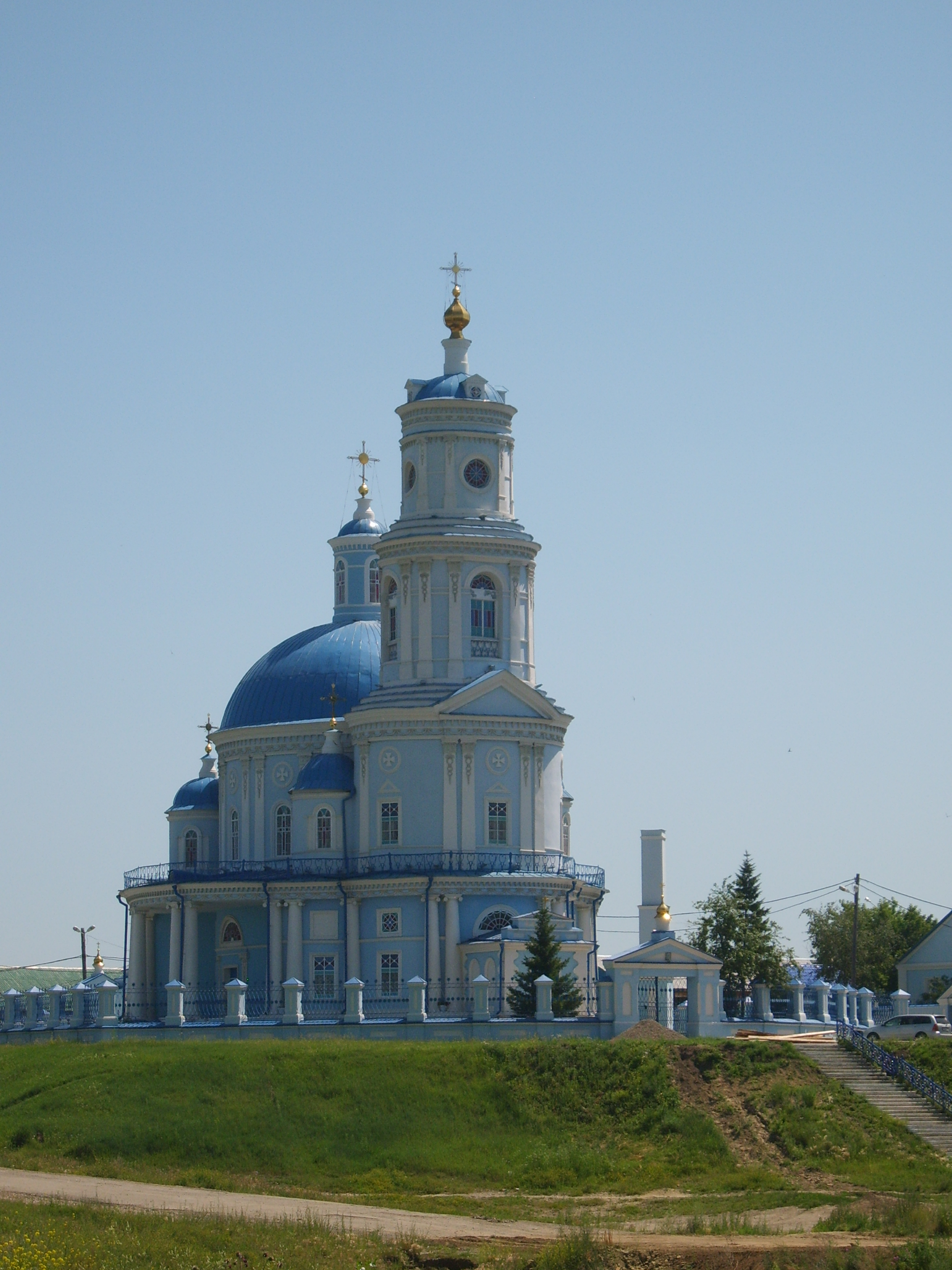
- The church is Telma

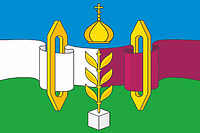
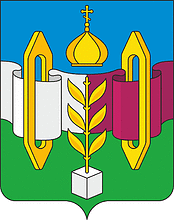
- Flag Coat of arms
- Interactive map of Telma
- Location of Telma Telma (Irkutsk Oblast)
- Coordinates: 52.6958°N 103.7156°E
- Country: Russia
- Federal subject: Irkutsk Oblast
- Administrative district: Usolsky District
- Founded: 1660
- Elevation: 439 m (1,440 ft)

Population (2010 Census)
  - Total: 4,576
  - Estimate (2025): 4,748 (+3.8%)
- Time zone: UTC+8 (MSK+5)
- Postal code: 665492
- OKTMO ID: 25640173051

Telma (Russian: Тельма) is an urban locality (an urban-type settlement) in Usolsky District of Irkutsk Oblast, Russia. Population: 4,576 (2010 census); 4,129 (2002 census); 4,154 (1989 Soviet census).
