= Administrative divisions of Ust-Orda Buryat Autonomous Okrug =

Administrative districts of former Russian federal subject

Ust-Orda Buryat Autonomous Okrug Russia
- Administrative center: Ust-Ordynsky

Administrative structure (as of December 31, 2007)
- Districts: 6
- Cities/towns: 0
- Urban-type settlements: 0
- Rural administrations: 77

Municipal structure (as of 2002)
- Rural settlements: 322 (inhabited); 5 (uninhabited)

Ust-Orda Buryat Autonomous Okrug was a federal subject of Russia until December 31, 2007. On January 1, 2008, it was merged with Irkutsk Oblast. During the transitional period of 2008–2009, it retained a special status within Irkutsk Oblast.

== Administrative and municipal divisions ==
- Districts:
  - Alarsky (Аларский)
    - with 17 rural administrations under the district's jurisdiction.
  - Bayandayevsky (Баяндаевский)
    - with 12 rural administrations under the district's jurisdiction.
  - Bokhansky (Боханский)
    - with 13 rural administrations under the district's jurisdiction. Administrative center Bokhan (Бохан, 53.15°N 103.78°E, population 5425 as of 2002).
  - Ekhirit-Bulagatsky (Эхирит-Булагатский)
    - with 13 rural administrations under the district's jurisdiction.
  - Nukutsky (Нукутский)
    - with 10 rural administrations under the district's jurisdiction.
  - Osinsky (Осинский)
    - with 12 rural administrations under the district's jurisdiction.
