= Tyret Pervaya =

Tyret Pervaya Тыреть 1-я
- Urban-type settlement
- Interactive map of Tyret Pervaya
- Location of Tyret Pervaya Tyret Pervaya (Irkutsk Oblast)
- Coordinates: 53.67303°N 102.31128°E
- Country: Russia
- Federal subject: Irkutsk Oblast
- Administrative district: Zalarinsky District

Population (2010 Census)
  - Total: 3,855
  - Estimate (2025): 3,529 (−8.5%)
- Time zone: UTC+8 (MSK+5)
- Postal code: 666330
- OKTMO ID: 25608155051

Tyret Pervaya (Russian: Тыре́ть 1-я) is an urban locality (an urban-type settlement) in Zalarinsky District of Irkutsk Oblast, Russia. Population: 3,855 (2010 census); 4,191 (2002 census); 4,414 (1989 Soviet census).
