= Oktyabrsky, Chunsky District, Irkutsk Oblast =

Oktyabrsky Октябрьский
- Urban-type settlement
- Interactive map of Oktyabrsky
- Location of Oktyabrsky Oktyabrsky (Irkutsk Oblast)
- Coordinates: 56.0723°N 99.4195°E
- Country: Russia
- Federal subject: Irkutsk Oblast
- Administrative district: Chunsky District
- Elevation: 271 m (889 ft)

Population (2010 Census)
  - Total: 5,415
  - Estimate (2025): 2,939 (−45.7%)
- Time zone: UTC+8 (MSK+5)
- Postal codes: 665540, 665541
- OKTMO ID: 25650165051

Oktyabrsky (Russian: Октябрьский) is an urban locality (an urban-type settlement) in Chunsky District of Irkutsk Oblast, Russia. Population: 5,415 (2010 census); 5,865 (2002 census); 8,575 (1989 Soviet census).
