= Alexeyevsk, Irkutsk Oblast =

Urban locality in Kirensky District of Irkutsk Oblast, Russia

Alexeyevsk Алексеевск
- Work settlement
- Interactive map of Alexeyevsk
- Location of Alexeyevsk Alexeyevsk (Irkutsk Oblast)
- Coordinates: 57°50′17″N 108°20′06″E
- Country: Russia
- Federal subject: Irkutsk Oblast
- Administrative district: Kirensky District
- Elevation: 431 m (1,414 ft)

Population (2010 Census)
  - Total: 2,529
  - Estimate (2025): 1,770 (−30%)

Municipal status
  - Municipal district: Kirensky Municipal District
  - Urban settlement: Alexeyevsk Urban Settlement
  - Capital of: Alexeyevsk Urban Settlement
- Time zone: UTC+8 (MSK+5)
- Postal code: 666712
- OKTMO ID: 25620155051

Alexeyevsk (Russian: Алексеевск) is an urban locality (urban-type settlement) in Kirensky District of Irkutsk Oblast, Russia. Population: 2,529 (2010 census); 3,164 (2002 census); 3,685 (1989 Soviet census).
