= Lesogorsk, Irkutsk Oblast =

Lesogorsk Лесогорск
- Urban-type settlement
- Interactive map of Lesogorsk
- Location of Lesogorsk Lesogorsk (Irkutsk Oblast)
- Coordinates: 56.0447°N 99.5253°E
- Country: Russia
- Federal subject: Irkutsk Oblast
- Administrative district: Chunsky District

Population (2010 Census)
  - Total: 5,511
  - Estimate (2025): 4,074 (−26.1%)
- Time zone: UTC+8 (MSK+5)
- Postal code: 665500
- OKTMO ID: 25650162051

Lesogorsk (Russian: Лесогорск) is an urban locality (an urban-type settlement) in Chunsky District of Irkutsk Oblast, Russia. Population: 5,511 (2010 census); 5,964 (2002 census); 8,841 (1989 Soviet census).
