= Zheleznodorozhny, Ust-Ilimsky District, Irkutsk Oblast =

Zheleznodorozhny Железнодорожный
- Urban-type settlement
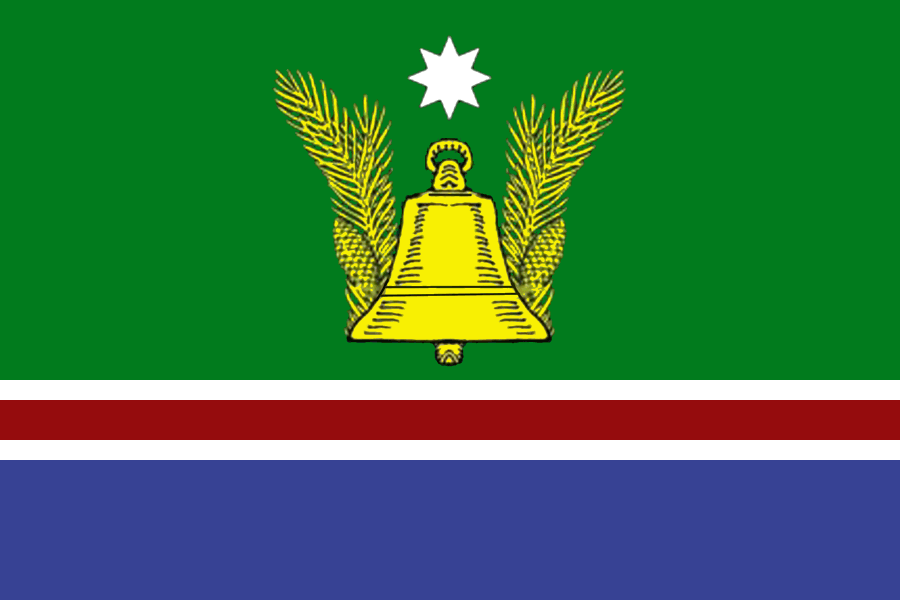
- Flag
- Interactive map of Zheleznodorozhny
- Location of Zheleznodorozhny Zheleznodorozhny (Irkutsk Oblast)
- Coordinates: 57.9084°N 102.7729°E
- Country: Russia
- Federal subject: Irkutsk Oblast
- Administrative district: Ust-Ilimsky District
- Elevation: 414 m (1,358 ft)

Population (2010 Census)
  - Total: 7,032
  - Estimate (2025): 5,591 (−20.5%)
- Time zone: UTC+8 (MSK+5)
- Postal code: 666661
- OKTMO ID: 25642155051

Zheleznodorozhny (Russian: Железнодорожный) is an urban locality (an urban-type settlement) in Ust-Ilimsky District of Irkutsk Oblast, Russia. Population: 7,032 (2010 census); 7,832 (2002 census); 9,095 (1989 Soviet census).
