= Sogdiondon =

Sogdiondon Согдиондон
- Urban-type settlement
- Interactive map of Sogdiondon
- Location of Sogdiondon Sogdiondon (Irkutsk Oblast)
- Coordinates: 57.6920°N 112.1633°E
- Country: Russia
- Federal subject: Irkutsk Oblast
- Administrative district: Mamsko-Chuysky District
- Founded: 1929
- Elevation: 783 m (2,569 ft)

Population (2010 Census)
  - Total: 275
  - Estimate (2017): 19 (−93.1%)
- Time zone: UTC+8 (MSK+5)
- Postal code: 666820
- OKTMO ID: 25624178051

Sogdiondon (Russian: Согдиондон) is an urban locality (an urban-type settlement) in Mamsko-Chuysky District of Irkutsk Oblast, Russia. Population: 275 (2010 census); 581 (2002 census); 2,097 (1989 Soviet census).
