= Vitimsky =

Vitimsky Витимский
- Urban-type settlement
- Interactive map of Vitimsky
- Location of Vitimsky Vitimsky (Irkutsk Oblast)
- Coordinates: 58.2204°N 113.2623°E
- Country: Russia
- Federal subject: Irkutsk Oblast
- Administrative district: Mamsko-Chuysky District
- Elevation: 224 m (735 ft)

Population (2010 Census)
  - Total: 457
  - Estimate (2025): 212 (−53.6%)
- Time zone: UTC+8 (MSK+5)
- Postal code: 666830
- OKTMO ID: 25624155051

Vitimsky (Russian: Витимский) is an urban locality (an urban-type settlement) in Mamsko-Chuysky District of Irkutsk Oblast, Russia. Population: 457 (2010 census); 909 (2002 census); 4,264 (1989 Soviet census).
