= Yantal =

Yantal Янталь
- Urban-type settlement
- Interactive map of Yantal
- Location of Yantal Yantal (Irkutsk Oblast)
- Coordinates: 56.8459°N 105.2501°E
- Country: Russia
- Federal subject: Irkutsk Oblast
- Administrative district: Ust-Kutsky District
- Founded: 1974
- Elevation: 401 m (1,316 ft)

Population (2010 Census)
  - Total: 1,792
  - Estimate (2025): 1,349 (−24.7%)
- Time zone: UTC+8 (MSK+5)
- Postal code: 666765
- OKTMO ID: 25644160051

Yantal (Russian: Янталь) is an urban locality (an urban-type settlement) in Ust-Kutsky District of Irkutsk Oblast, Russia. Population: 1,792 (2010 census); 2,446 (2002 census);
