= Yurty, Irkutsk Oblast =

Yurty Юрты
- Urban-type settlement
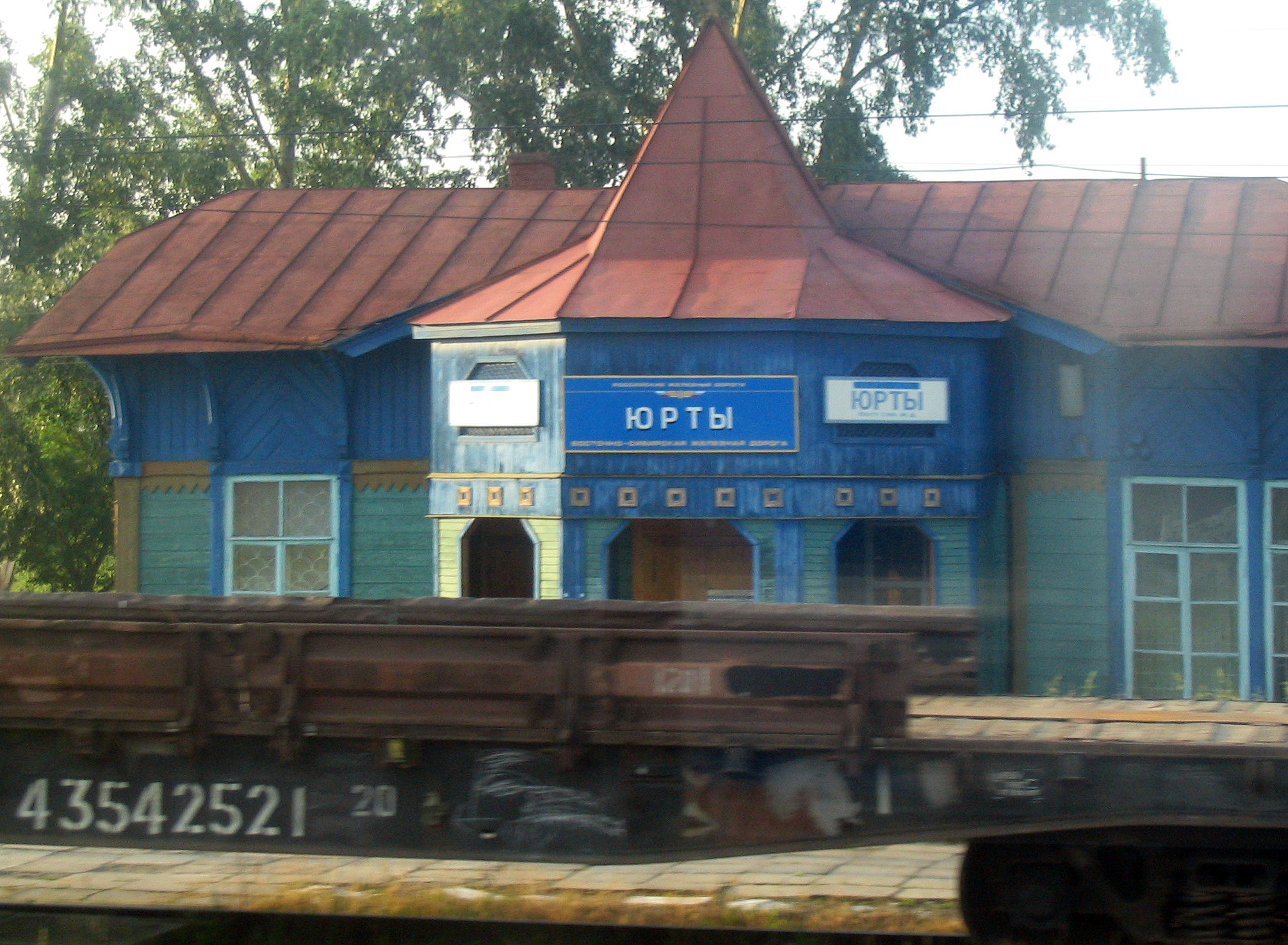
- Yurty station on the Trans-Siberian Railway

- Flag
- Interactive map of Yurty
- Location of Yurty Yurty (Irkutsk Oblast)
- Coordinates: 56°02′N 97°38′E
- Country: Russia
- Federal subject: Irkutsk Oblast
- Administrative district: Tayshetsky District
- Founded: 1903

Population (2010 Census)
  - Total: 5,301
  - Estimate (2025): 4,887 (−7.8%)
- Time zone: UTC+8 (MSK+5)
- Postal code: 665076
- OKTMO ID: 25636156051

Yurty (Russian: Юрты) is an urban locality (a work settlement) in Tayshetsky District of Irkutsk Oblast, Russia, located on the Trans-Siberian Railway. Population: 5,301 (2010 census); 6,059 (2002 census); 6,898 (1989 Soviet census).
