= Bratsky District =

Bratsky District Братский район (Russian)
- District
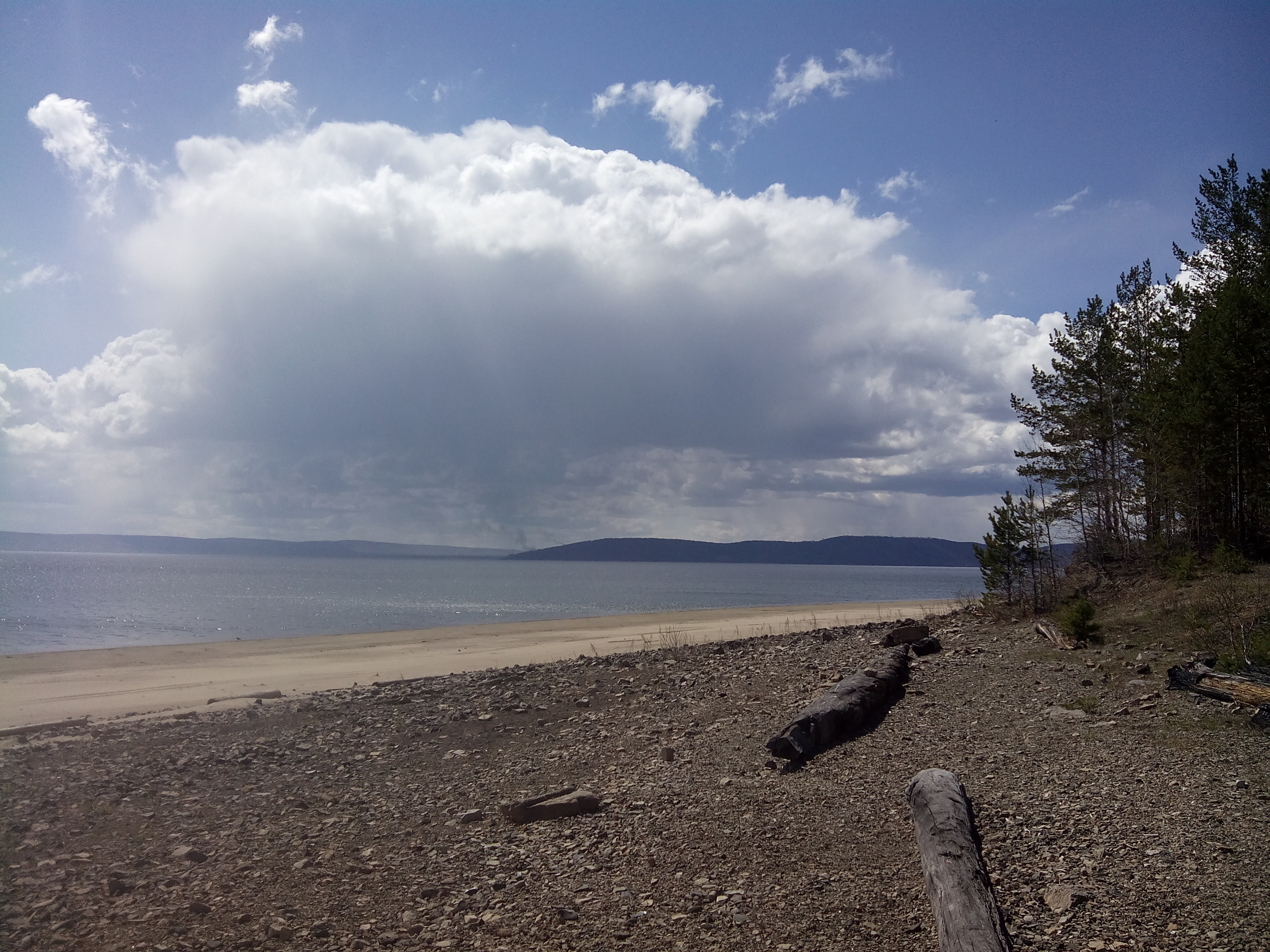
- Fraternal Seashore Resort, Bratsky District

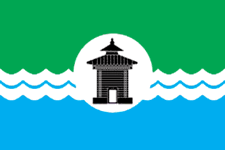
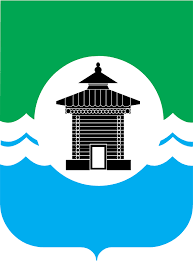
- Flag Coat of arms
- Location of Bratsky District (#7) in west-central Irkutsk Oblast
- Coordinates: 56°07′N 101°36′E
- Country: Russia
- Federal subject: Irkutsk Oblast
- Established: 28 June 1926
- Administrative center: Bratsk

Area
  - Total: 33,660 km^{2} (13,000 sq mi)

Population (2010 Census)
  - Total: 56,878
  - Density: 1.690/km^{2} (4.377/sq mi)
  - Urban: 39.6%
  - Rural: 60.4%

Administrative structure
  - Inhabited localities: 1 cities/towns, 58 rural localities

Municipal structure
  - Municipally incorporated as: Bratsky Municipal District
  - Municipal divisions: 1 urban settlements, 24 rural settlements
- Time zone: UTC+8 (MSK+5)
- OKTMO ID: 25604000

Bratsky District (Russian: Бра́тский райо́н) is an administrative district, one of the thirty-three in Irkutsk Oblast, Russia. Municipally, it is incorporated as Bratsky Municipal District. It is located in the northwest of the oblast. The area of the district is 33,660 square kilometers (13,000 sq mi). Its administrative center is the city of Bratsk (which is not administratively a part of the district). Population: 56,878 (2010 census); 65,240 (2002 Census); 76,945 (1989 Soviet census).

== Administrative and municipal status ==
Within the framework of administrative divisions, Bratsky District is one of the thirty-three in the oblast. The city of Bratsk serves as its administrative center, despite being incorporated separately as an administrative unit with the status equal to that of the districts.

As a municipal division, the district is incorporated as Bratsky Municipal District. The City of Bratsk is incorporated separately from the district as Bratsk Urban Okrug.
