= Yangel (urban-type settlement) =

Yangel Янгель
- Urban-type settlement
- Interactive map of Yangel
- Location of Yangel Yangel (Irkutsk Oblast)
- Coordinates: 57.0795°N 103.6496°E
- Country: Russia
- Federal subject: Irkutsk Oblast
- Administrative district: Nizhneilimsky District

Population (2010 Census)
  - Total: 1,042
  - Estimate (2025): 864 (−17.1%)
- Time zone: UTC+8 (MSK+5)
- Postal code: 665699
- OKTMO ID: 25626175051

Yangel (Russian: Янгель) is an urban locality (an urban-type settlement) in Nizhneilimsky District of Irkutsk Oblast, Russia. Population: 1,042 (2010 census); 1,000 (2002 census);
