= Zheleznogorsk-Ilimsky =

Town in Irkutsk Oblast, Russia

Zheleznogorsk-Ilimsky Железногорск-Илимский
- Town
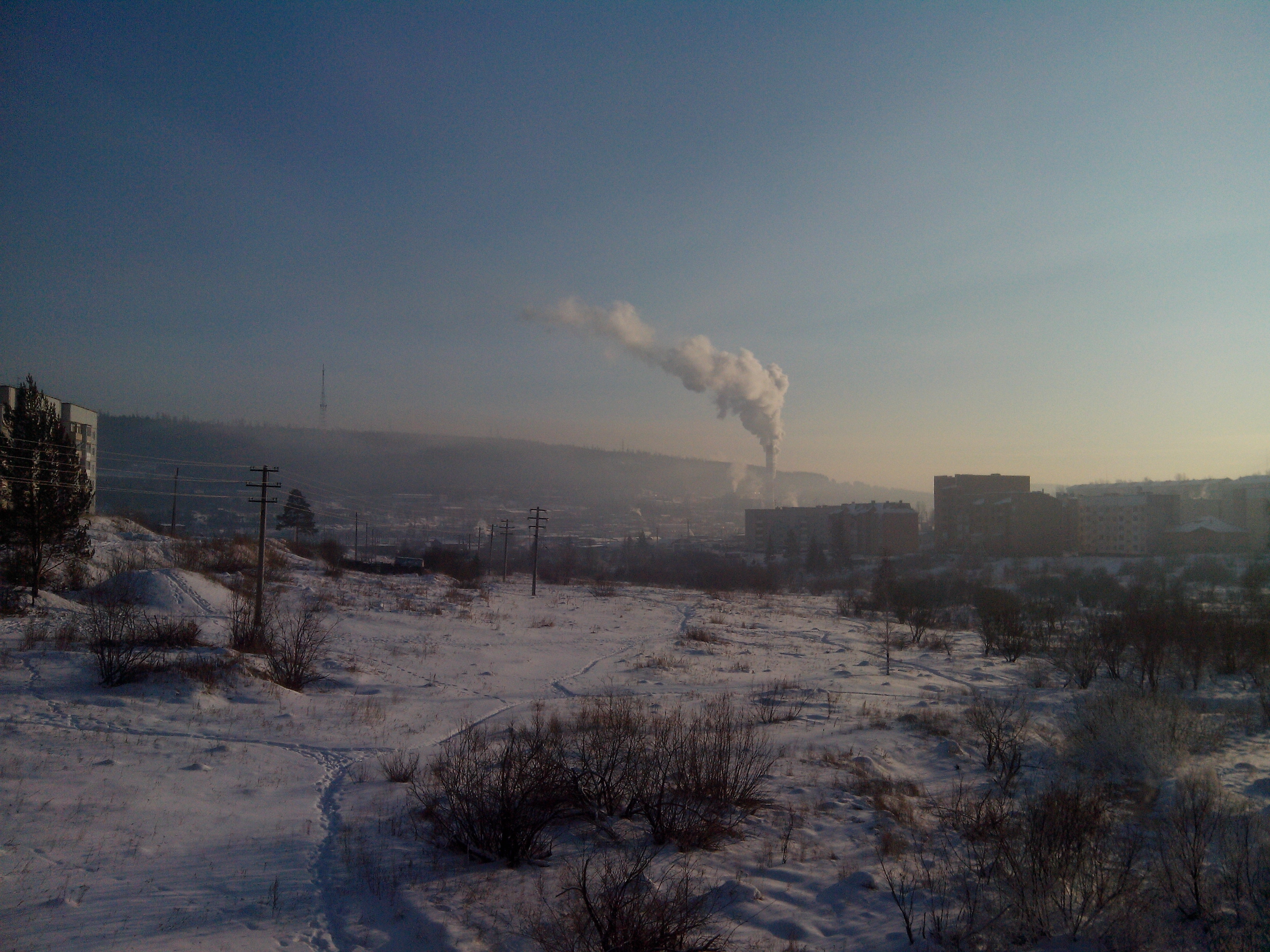
- Zheleznogorsk-Ilimsky

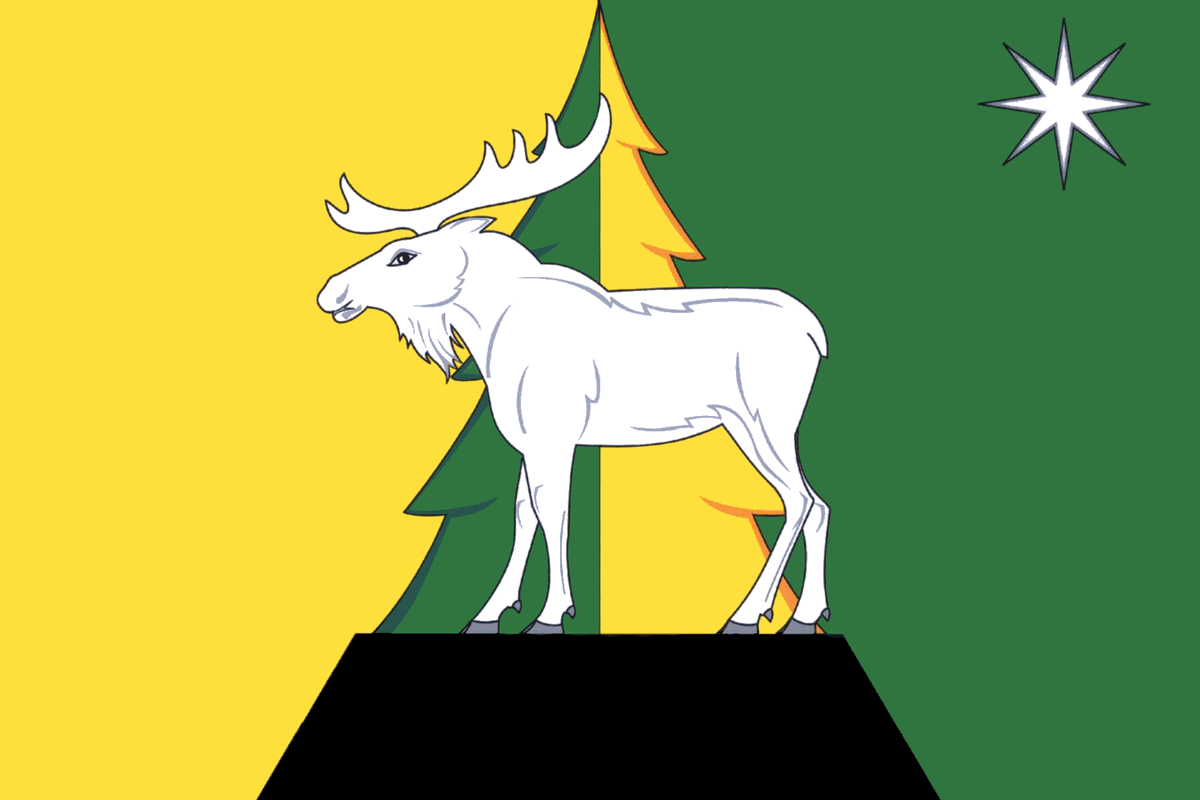
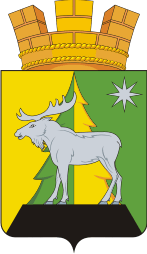
- Flag Coat of arms
- Interactive map of Zheleznogorsk-Ilimsky
- Location of Zheleznogorsk-Ilimsky Zheleznogorsk-Ilimsky (Irkutsk Oblast)
- Coordinates: 56°35′N 104°08′E
- Country: Russia
- Federal subject: Irkutsk Oblast
- Administrative district: Nizhneilimsky District
- Founded: 1948
- Town status since: 1965

Government
  - Mayor: Semyon Gendelman
- Elevation: 430 m (1,410 ft)

Population (2010 Census)
  - Total: 26,079
  - Estimate (2021): 21,621 (−17.1%)

Administrative status
  - Capital of: Nizhneilimsky District

Municipal status
  - Municipal district: Nizhneilimsky Municipal District
  - Urban settlement: Zheleznogorskoye Urban Settlement
  - Capital of: Nizhneilimsky Municipal District, Zheleznogorskoye Urban Settlement
- Time zone: UTC+8 (MSK+5)
- Postal codes: 665650, 665651, 665653, 665654
- Dialing code: +7 39566
- OKTMO ID: 25626101001
- Website: zhel-ilimskoe.irkobl.ru

Zheleznogorsk-Ilimsky (Russian: Железногорск-Илимский, IPA: [ʐɪlʲɪznɐˈgorsk ɪˈlʲimskʲɪj]) is a town and the administrative center of Nizhneilimsky District of Irkutsk Oblast, Russia, located 478 kilometers (297 mi) north of Irkutsk, the administrative center of the oblast. Population: 26,079 (2010 census); 29,093 (2002 census); 32,326 (1989 Soviet census).

== Geography ==
The town is located in the Lena-Angara Plateau.

== History ==
It was founded in 1948, in connection with the beginning of exploitation of the iron deposits at Zheleznaya Gora (Iron Mountain). It was initially named Korshunikha (Коршуниха), after prospector Shestak Korshunov who had discovered the Iron Mountain in the 17th century.

It was granted urban-type settlement status in the 1950s, after a period of growth following the construction of the western section of the Baikal–Amur Mainline, and renamed Zheleznogorsk (Iron Mountain Town). With the completion of a major ore processing plant, town status was granted in 1965 under the present name, the suffix "Ilimsky" added to differentiate from other towns of the same name.

== Administrative and municipal status ==
Within the framework of administrative divisions, Zheleznogorsk-Ilimsky serves as the administrative center of Nizhneilimsky District, to which it is directly subordinated. As a municipal division, the town of Zheleznogorsk-Ilimsky is incorporated within Nizhneilimsky Municipal District as Zheleznogorskoye Urban Settlement.

== Economy ==
The town's economy is mainly reliant on the open pit iron ore mine and ore processing works, owned by the company Mechel Inc.

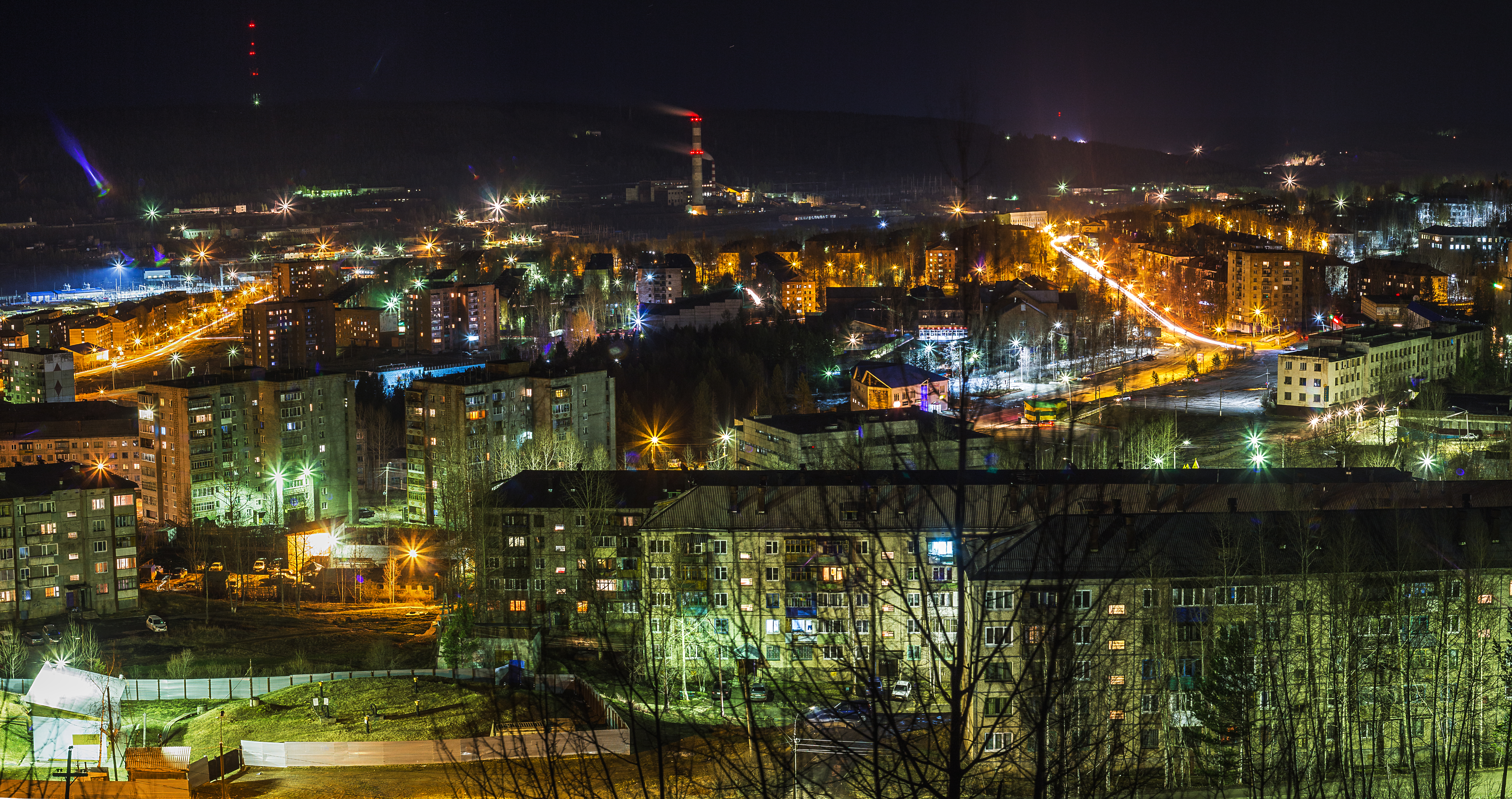
Zheleznogorsk-Ilimsky at night

=== Transportation ===
The town has a station called Korshunikha-Angarskaya on the Baikal–Amur Mainline, it is also on the road from Bratsk to Ust-Kut.

== Sister city ==
- Sakata, Japan
