= Ust-Ilimsky District =

Ust-Ilimsky District Усть-Илимский район (Russian)
- District
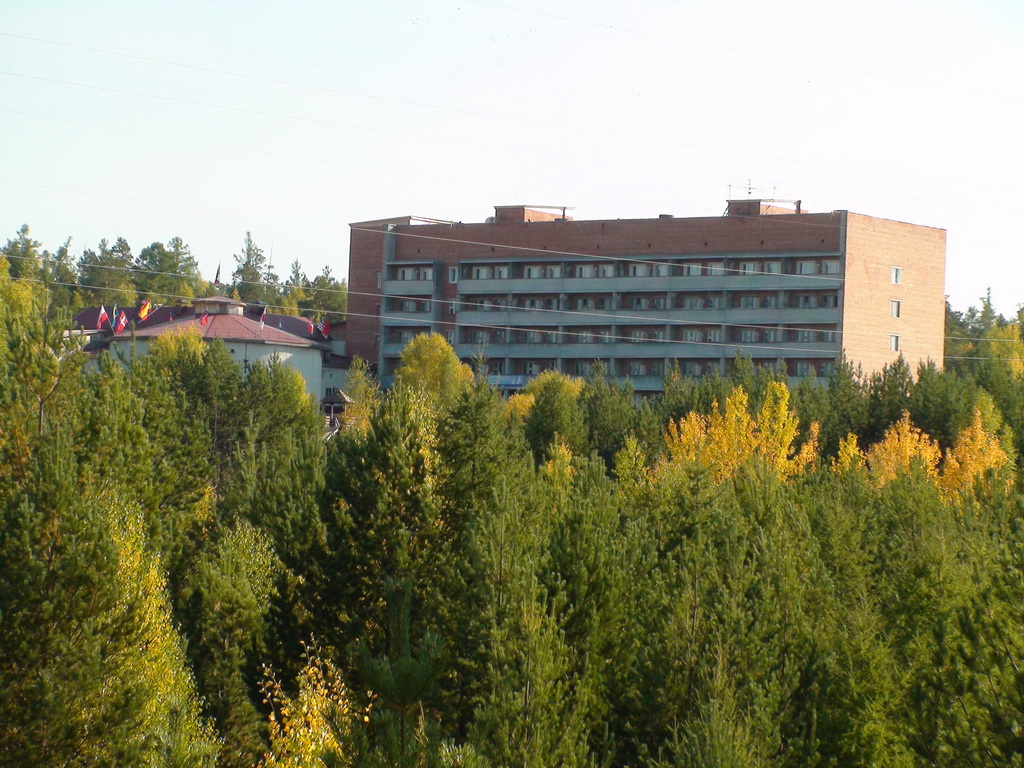
- "Rus" Resort in Ust-Ilimsky District

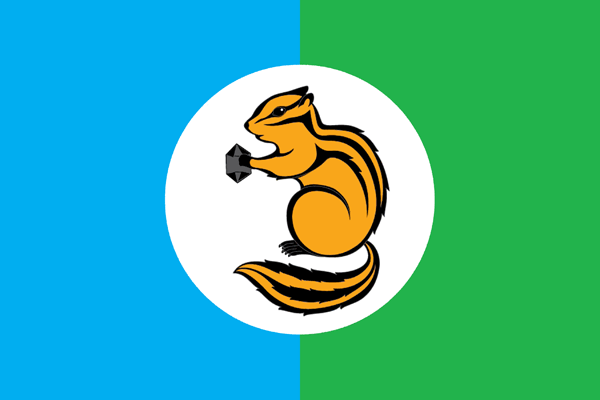
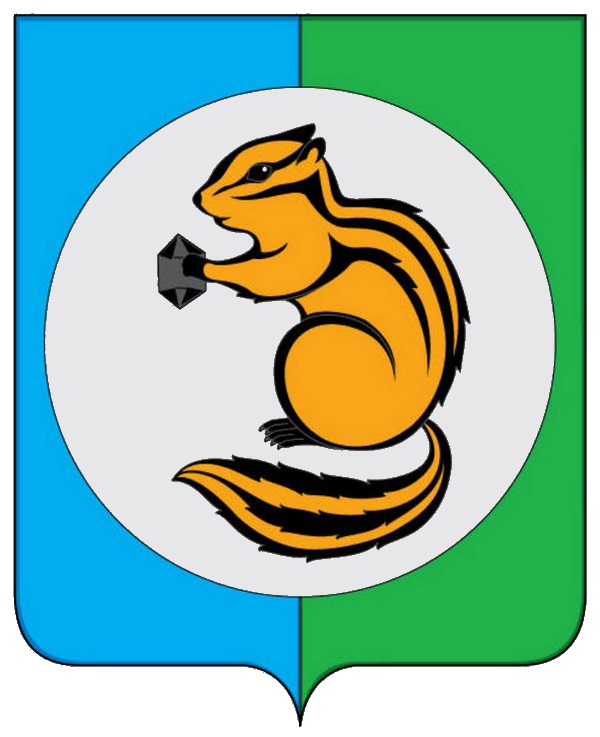
- Flag Coat of arms
- Location of Ust-Ilimsky District in Irkutsk Oblast
- Coordinates: 57°59′N 102°44′E
- Country: Russia
- Federal subject: Irkutsk Oblast
- Established: 1968
- Administrative center: Ust-Ilimsk

Area
  - Total: 36,600 km^{2} (14,100 sq mi)

Population (2010 Census)
  - Total: 18,589
  - Density: 0.508/km^{2} (1.32/sq mi)
  - Urban: 37.8%
  - Rural: 62.2%

Administrative structure
  - Inhabited localities: 1 urban-type settlements, 11 rural localities

Municipal structure
  - Municipally incorporated as: Ust-Ilimsky Municipal District
  - Municipal divisions: 1 urban settlements, 7 rural settlements
- Time zone: UTC+8 (MSK+5)
- OKTMO ID: 25642000
- Website: http://uiraion.irkobl.ru

Population of Ust-Ilimsky District
- 2010 Census: 18,589
- 2002 Census: 21,154
- 1989 Census: 25,832
- 1979 Census: 26,135

Ust-Ilimsky District (Russian: Усть-Или́мский райо́н) is an administrative district, one of the thirty-three in Irkutsk Oblast, Russia. Municipally, it is incorporated as Ust-Ilimsky Municipal District. It is located in the north of the oblast. The area of the district is 36,600 square kilometers (14,100 sq mi). Its administrative center is the town of Ust-Ilimsk (which is not administratively a part of the district). As of the 2010 Census, the total population of the district was 18,589.

== Administrative and municipal status ==
Within the framework of administrative divisions, Ust-Ilimsky District is one of the thirty-three in the oblast. The town of Ust-Ilimsk serves as its administrative center, despite being incorporated separately as an administrative unit with the status equal to that of the districts.

As a municipal division, the district is incorporated as Ust-Ilimsky Municipal District. The Town of Ust-Ilimsk is incorporated separately from the district as Ust-Ilimsk Urban Okrug.
