= Cheremkhovsky District =

Cheremkhovsky District Черемховский район (Russian)
- District
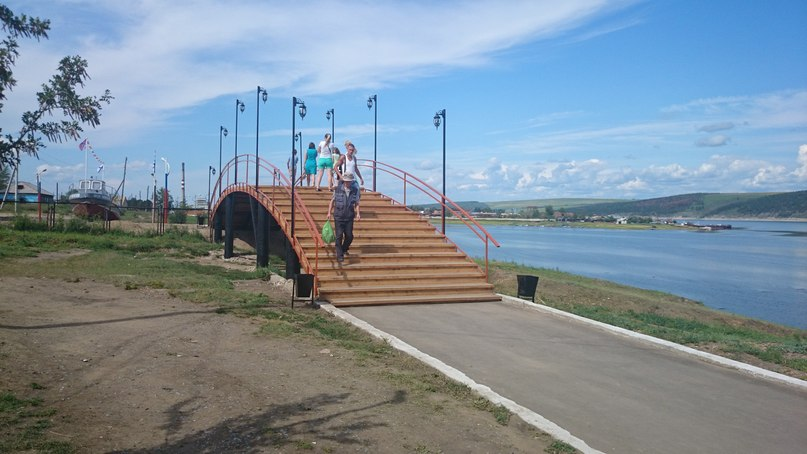
- Bridge on the embankment in Svirsk, Cheremkhovsky District

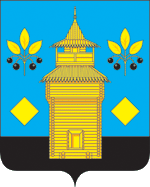
- Flag Coat of arms
- Location of Cheremkhovsky District in Irkutsk Oblast
- Coordinates: 53°09′N 103°04′E
- Country: Russia
- Federal subject: Irkutsk Oblast
- Established: 1926
- Administrative center: Cheremkhovo

Area
  - Total: 9,900 km^{2} (3,800 sq mi)

Population (2010 Census)
  - Total: 30,114
  - Density: 3.0/km^{2} (7.9/sq mi)
  - Urban: 26.0%
  - Rural: 74.0%

Administrative structure
  - Inhabited localities: 1 urban-type settlements, 99 rural localities

Municipal structure
  - Municipally incorporated as: Cheremkhovsky Municipal District
  - Municipal divisions: 1 urban settlements, 17 rural settlements
- Time zone: UTC+8 (MSK+5)
- OKTMO ID: 25648000
- Website: https://cherraion.ru/

Population of Cheremkhovsky District
- 2010 Census: 30,114
- 2002 Census: 32,746
- 1989 Census: 36,127
- 1979 Census: 35,556

Cheremkhovsky District (Russian: Черемхо́вский райо́н) is an administrative district, one of the thirty-three in Irkutsk Oblast, Russia. Municipally, it is incorporated as Cheremkhovsky Municipal District. It is located in the southwest of the oblast. The area of the district is 9,887.42 square kilometers (3,817.55 sq mi). Its administrative center is the town of Cheremkhovo (which is not administratively a part of the district). As of the 2010 Census, the total population of the district was 30,114.

== History ==
The district was established in 1926.

== Administrative and municipal status ==
Within the framework of administrative divisions, Cheremkhovsky District is one of the thirty-three in the oblast. The town of Cheremkhovo serves as its administrative center, despite being incorporated separately as an administrative unit with the status equal to that of the districts.

As a municipal division, the district is incorporated as Cheremkhovsky Municipal District. The Town of Cheremkhovo is incorporated separately from the district as Cheremkhovo Urban Okrug.
