= Irkutsky District =

Irkutsky District Иркутский район (Russian)
- District
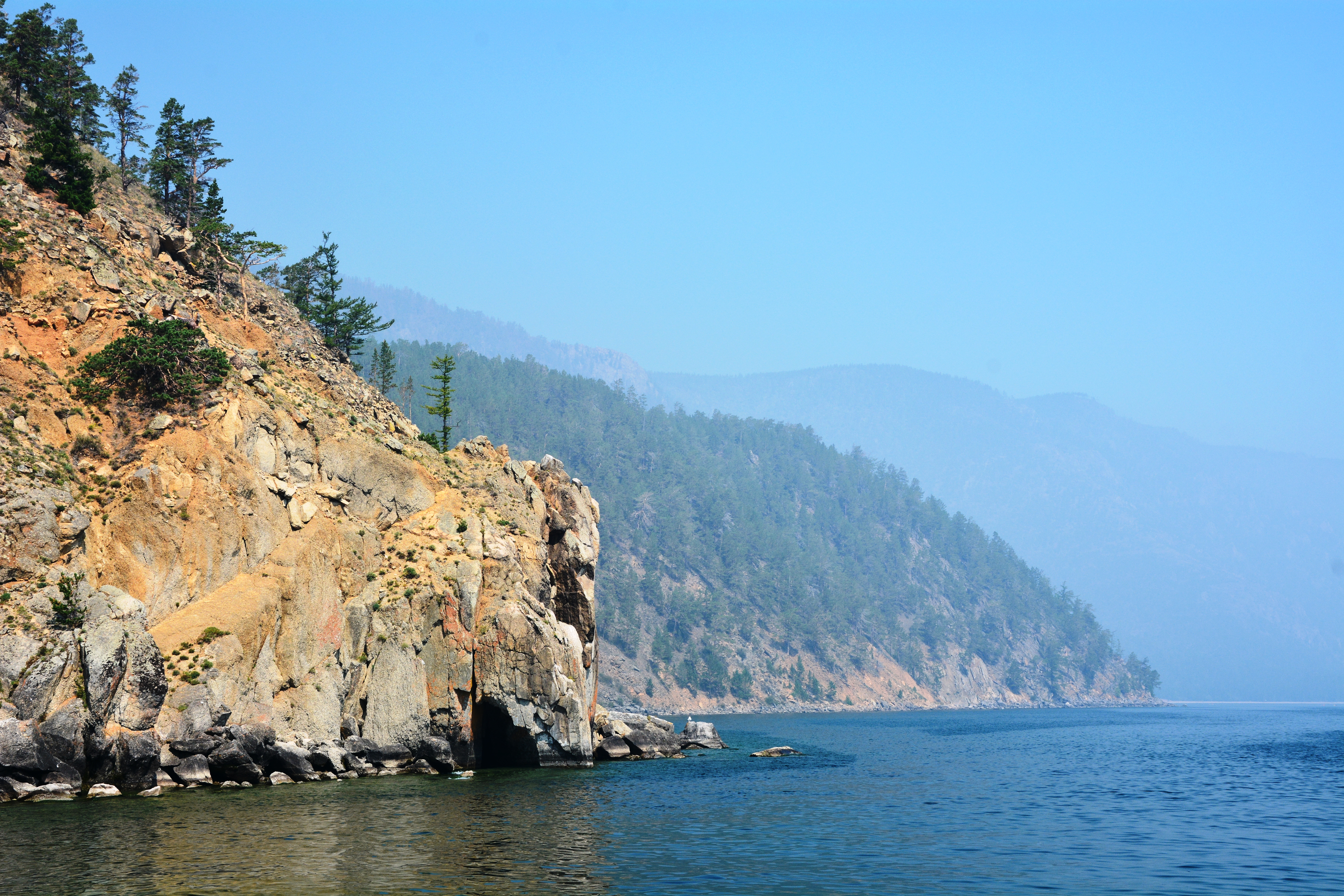
- Cape Arka, a protected area of Russia in Irkutsky District

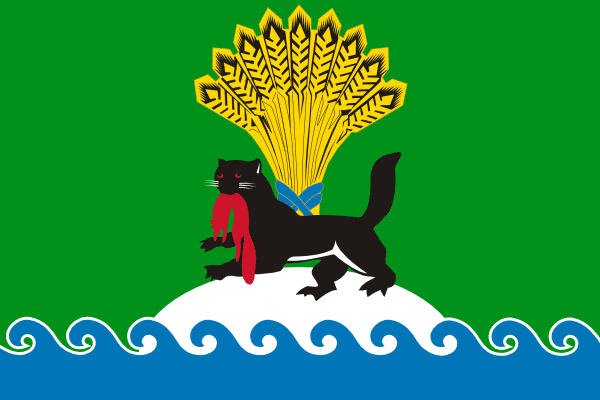
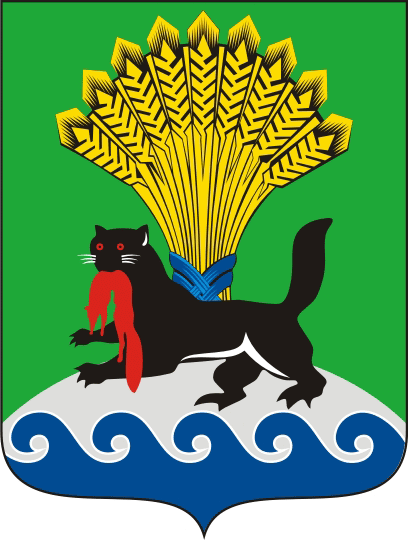
- Flag Coat of arms
- Location of Irkutsky District in Irkutsk Oblast
- Coordinates: 52°17′N 104°18′E
- Country: Russia
- Federal subject: Irkutsk Oblast
- Established: 1937
- Administrative center: Irkutsk

Area
  - Total: 11,300 km^{2} (4,400 sq mi)

Population (2010 Census)
  - Total: 84,322
  - Density: 7.46/km^{2} (19.3/sq mi)
  - Urban: 17.1%
  - Rural: 82.9%

Administrative structure
  - Inhabited localities: 3 urban-type settlements, 82 rural localities

Municipal structure
  - Municipally incorporated as: Irkutsky Municipal District
  - Municipal divisions: 3 urban settlements, 18 rural settlements
- Time zone: UTC+8 (MSK+5)
- OKTMO ID: 25612000
- Website: http://www.irkraion.ru

Population of Irkutsky District
- 2010 Census: 84,322
- 2002 Census: 59,850
- 1989 Census: 56,885
- 1979 Census: 53,554

Irkutsky District (Russian: Ирку́тский райо́н) is an administrative district, one of the thirty-three in Irkutsk Oblast, Russia. Municipally, it is incorporated as Irkutsky Municipal District. It is located in the south of the oblast. The area of the district is 11,300 square kilometers (4,400 sq mi). Its administrative center is the city of Irkutsk (which is not administratively a part of the district). According to 2010 Census, the total population of the district was 84,322.

== History ==
The district was established in 1937.

== Administrative and municipal status ==
Within the framework of administrative divisions, Irkutsky District is one of the thirty-three in the oblast. The city of Irkutsk serves as its administrative center, despite being incorporated separately as an administrative unit with the status equal to that of the districts.

As a municipal division, the district is incorporated as Irkutsky Municipal District. The City of Irkutsk is incorporated separately from the district as Irkutsk Urban Okrug.
