= Nizhneudinsk =

Town in Irkutsk Oblast, Russia

Nizhneudinsk Нижнеудинск
- Town

Other transcription(s)
  - Buryat: Доодо-Үдэ
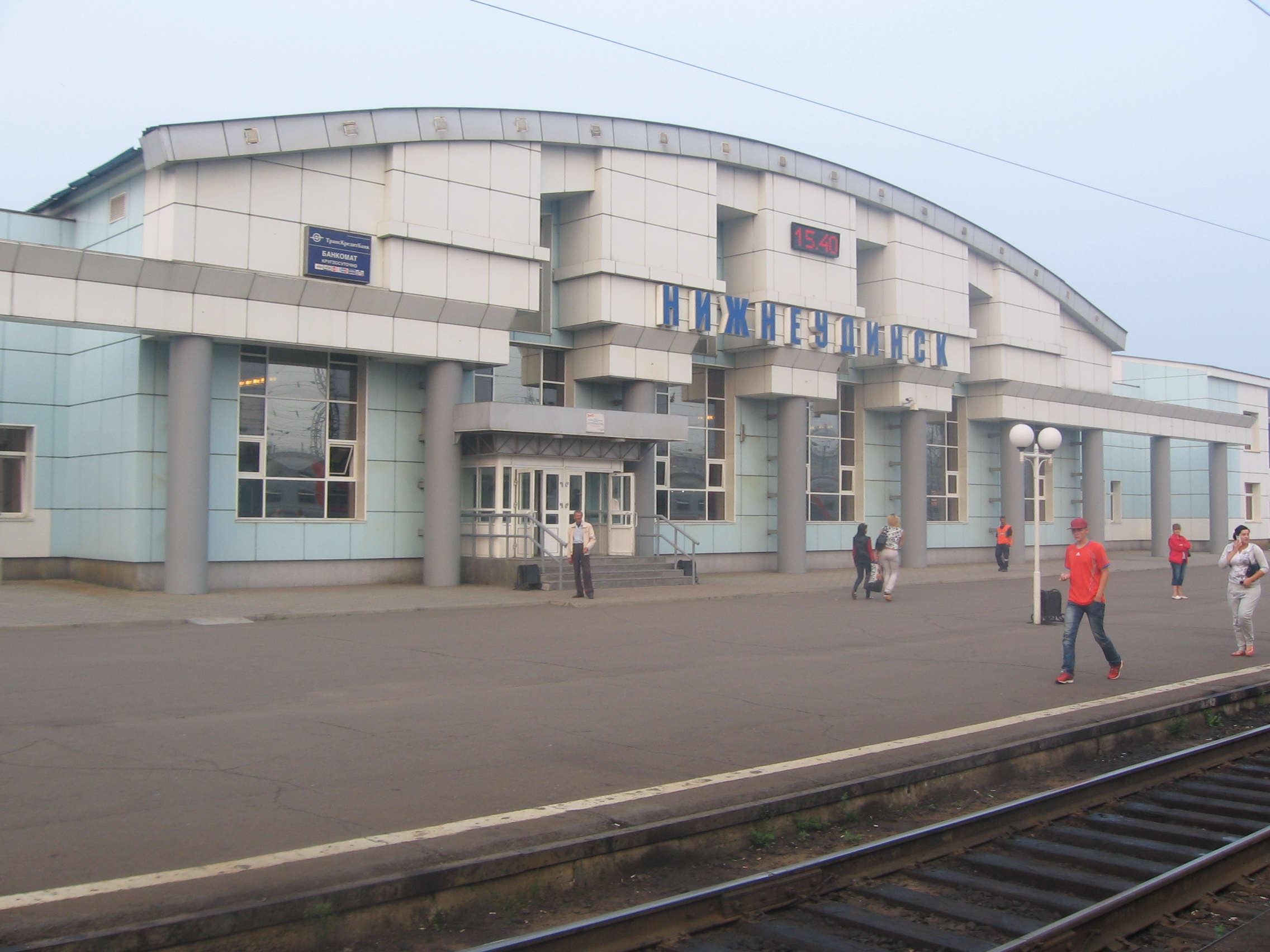
- Nizhneudinsk Train Station

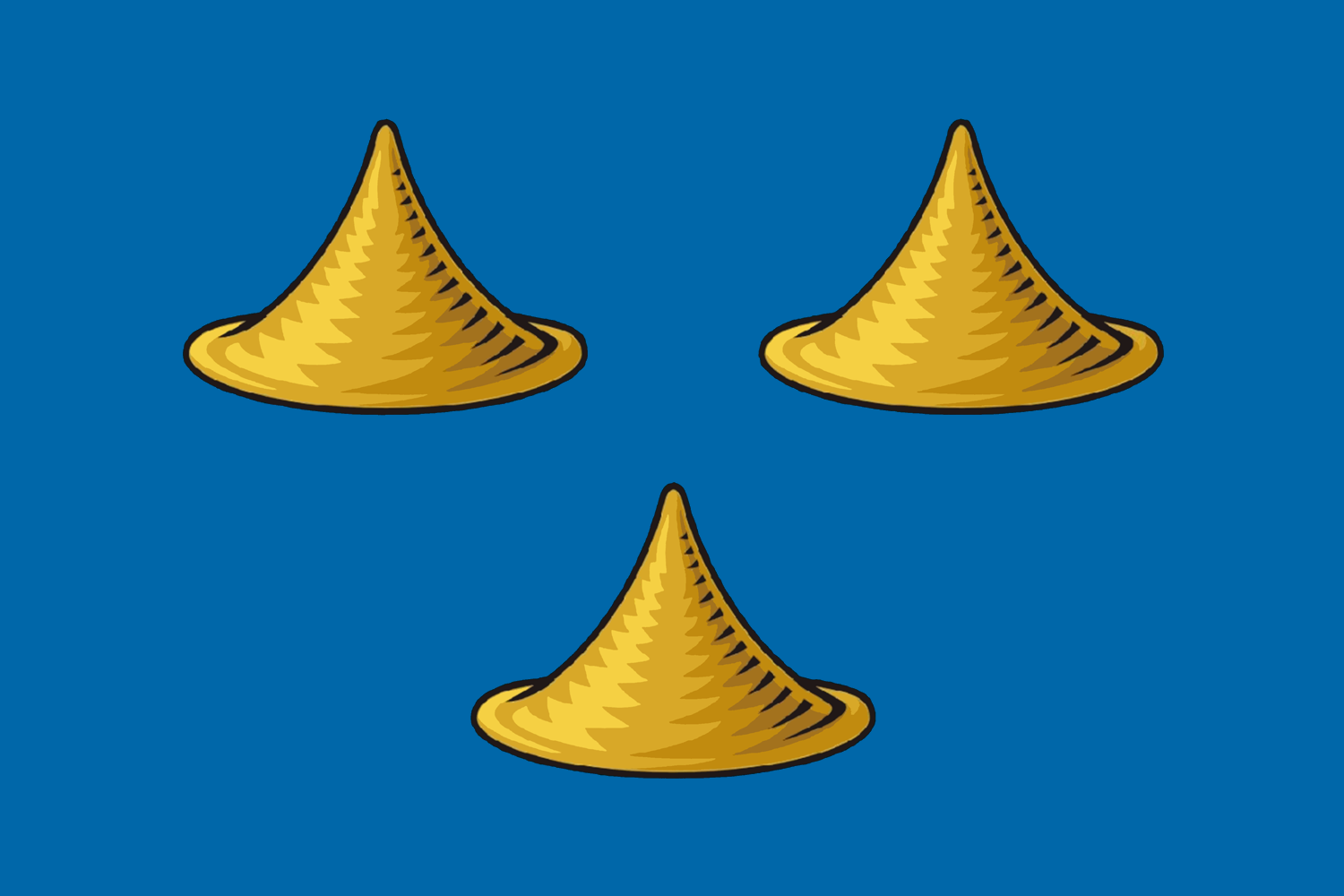
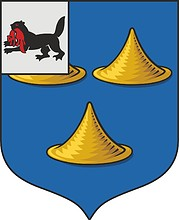
- Flag Coat of arms
- Interactive map of Nizhneudinsk
- Location of Nizhneudinsk Nizhneudinsk (Irkutsk Oblast)
- Coordinates: 54°56′N 99°00′E
- Country: Russia
- Federal subject: Irkutsk Oblast
- Administrative district: Nizhneudinsky District
- Founded: 1648
- Town status since: 1763

Area
  - Total: 75 km^{2} (29 sq mi)
- Elevation: 420 m (1,380 ft)

Population (2010 Census)
  - Total: 36,999
  - Estimate (2013): 35,500 (−4.1%)
  - Density: 490/km^{2} (1,300/sq mi)

Administrative status
  - Capital of: Nizhneudinsky District

Municipal status
  - Municipal district: Nizhneudinsky Municipal District
  - Urban settlement: Nizhneudinskoye Urban Settlement
  - Capital of: Nizhneudinsky Municipal District, Nizhneudinskoye Urban Settlement
- Time zone: UTC+8 (MSK+5)
- Postal codes: 664810, 665100–665104, 665106
- Dialing code: +7 39557
- OKTMO ID: 25628101001

Nizhneudinsk (Russian: Нижнеу́динск, IPA: [nʲɪʐnʲɪˈudʲɪnsk]; Buryat: Доодо-Үдэ, Doodo-Üde) is a town and the administrative center of Nizhneudinsky District of Irkutsk Oblast, Russia, located on the Uda River (Yenisei's basin), 506 kilometers (314 mi) northwest of Irkutsk, the administrative center of the oblast. Population: 36,999 (2010 census); 39,624 (2002 census); 43,759 (1989 Soviet census); 39,700 (1970).

== History ==
It was founded in 1648 and granted town status in 1783. Nizhneudinsk was so named to distinguish it from Verkhneudinsk (now Ulan-Ude).

== Administrative and municipal status ==
Within the framework of administrative divisions, Nizhneudinsk serves as the administrative center of Nizhneudinsky District, to which it is directly subordinated. As a municipal division, the town of Nizhneudinsk is incorporated within Nizhneudinsky Municipal District as Nizhneudinskoye Urban Settlement.

== Economy ==
=== Transportation ===
The town stands on the Trans-Siberian Railway and is served by a small airport, ICAO code UINN.

== Military ==
In 1987, the 91st Motor Rifle Division was withdrawn from Mongolia and arrived at Nizhneudinsk. Later that year it became a Territorial Education Center, and then a Base for Storage of Weapons and Equipment. It was redesignated twice before becoming the 187th Base for Storage of Weapons and Equipment. The 187th Base for Storage and Repair of Weapons and Equipment of the Central Military District is based in the town.

== Climate ==
Nizhneudinsk has a subarctic climate (Köppen climate classification Dwc), with long, severely cold winters and short, warm summers. Precipitation is quite low but is much higher in summer than at other times of the year.

Climate data for Nizhneudinsk
Month	Jan	Feb	Mar	Apr	May	Jun	Jul	Aug	Sep	Oct	Nov	Dec	Year
Record high °C (°F)	8.0 (46.4)	12.9 (55.2)	19.5 (67.1)	31.0 (87.8)	34.3 (93.7)	36.3 (97.3)	35.4 (95.7)	36.4 (97.5)	31.7 (89.1)	26.9 (80.4)	16.0 (60.8)	10.4 (50.7)	36.4 (97.5)
Mean daily maximum °C (°F)	−13.5 (7.7)	−7.1 (19.2)	1.8 (35.2)	10.4 (50.7)	17.9 (64.2)	23.9 (75.0)	25.4 (77.7)	22.8 (73.0)	15.5 (59.9)	7.4 (45.3)	−3.8 (25.2)	−11.9 (10.6)	7.4 (45.3)
Daily mean °C (°F)	−20.6 (−5.1)	−16.0 (3.2)	−6.7 (19.9)	2.6 (36.7)	9.5 (49.1)	15.9 (60.6)	18.3 (64.9)	15.5 (59.9)	8.3 (46.9)	0.6 (33.1)	−9.5 (14.9)	−17.7 (0.1)	0.0 (32.0)
Mean daily minimum °C (°F)	−26.3 (−15.3)	−23.3 (−9.9)	−14.1 (6.6)	−4.0 (24.8)	1.8 (35.2)	8.6 (47.5)	12.1 (53.8)	9.8 (49.6)	3.0 (37.4)	−4.2 (24.4)	−14.0 (6.8)	−22.6 (−8.7)	−6.1 (21.0)
Record low °C (°F)	−49.7 (−57.5)	−47.5 (−53.5)	−45.2 (−49.4)	−32.0 (−25.6)	−11.6 (11.1)	−4.5 (23.9)	−0.8 (30.6)	−2.6 (27.3)	−9.7 (14.5)	−27.5 (−17.5)	−42.6 (−44.7)	−49.6 (−57.3)	−49.7 (−57.5)
Average precipitation mm (inches)	8.5 (0.33)	7.3 (0.29)	10.6 (0.42)	18.0 (0.71)	33.7 (1.33)	67.3 (2.65)	92.0 (3.62)	92.7 (3.65)	50.6 (1.99)	20.3 (0.80)	16.1 (0.63)	13.9 (0.55)	431 (16.97)
Average snowfall cm (inches)	19 (7.5)	20 (7.9)	13 (5.1)	1 (0.4)	0 (0)	0 (0)	0 (0)	0 (0)	0 (0)	1 (0.4)	7 (2.8)	15 (5.9)	76 (30)
Average precipitation days (≥ 0.1 mm)	17.1	15.1	15.3	18	19	20.1	18	20	19	19	20.3	19	219.9
Average snowy days	17	15	14	8	2	0	0	0	1	8	18	19	102
Average relative humidity (%)	83	79	71	62	60	69	75	80	78	76	81	84	75
Source: Pogoda.ru.net
