= Kazachinsko-Lensky District =

Kazachinsko-Lensky District Казачинско-Ленский район (Russian)
- District
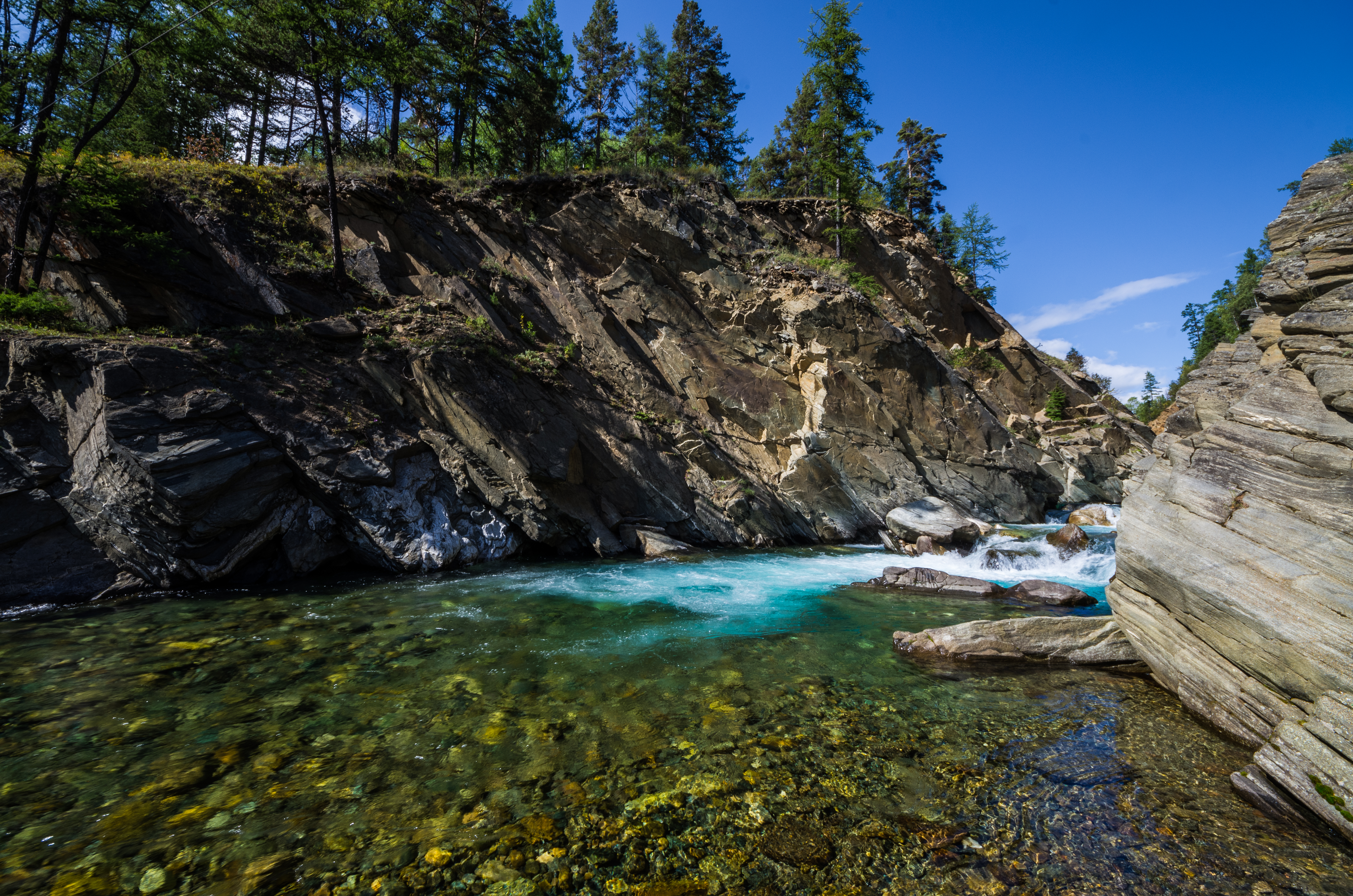
- Remains of the Bolshoy Kaskad Waterfall, a protected area of Russia on the Kurkula River in Kazachinsko-Lensky District

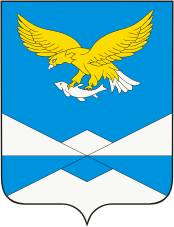
- Flag Coat of arms
- Location of Kazachinsko-Lensky District in Irkutsk Oblast
- Coordinates: 56°17′N 107°34′E
- Country: Russia
- Federal subject: Irkutsk Oblast
- Established: June 26, 1926
- Administrative center: Kazachinskoye

Area
  - Total: 33,300 km^{2} (12,900 sq mi)

Population (2010 Census)
  - Total: 18,829
  - Density: 0.565/km^{2} (1.46/sq mi)
  - Urban: 66.6%
  - Rural: 33.4%

Administrative structure
  - Inhabited localities: 3 urban-type settlements, 21 rural localities

Municipal structure
  - Municipally incorporated as: Kazachinsko-Lensky Municipal District
  - Municipal divisions: 3 urban settlements, 6 rural settlements
- Time zone: UTC+8 (MSK+5)
- OKTMO ID: 25614000
- Website: http://www.adminklr.ru

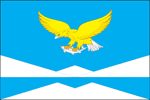

Population of Kazachinsko-Lensky District
- 2010 Census: 18,829
- 2002 Census: 21,127
- 1989 Census: 29,394
- 1979 Census: 18,981

Kazachinsko-Lensky District (Russian: Каза́чинско-Ле́нский райо́н) is an administrative district, one of the thirty-three in Irkutsk Oblast, Russia. Municipally, it is incorporated as Kazachinsko-Lensky Municipal District. It is located in the eastern-central portion of the oblast. The area of the district is 33,300 square kilometers (12,900 sq mi). Its administrative center is the rural locality (a selo) of Kazachinskoye. As of the 2010 Census, the total population of the district was 18,829, with the population of Kazachinskoye accounting for 13.9% of that number.

== History ==
Kazachinsky District (Казачинский район) was established within Kirensk Okrug of Irkutsk Oblast on June 26, 1926. It was given its present name on December 3, 1930.

== Geography ==
The Baikal Range and the Akitkan Range (Хребет Акиткан) rise in the district. The Kirenga River is the main water body of the Kazachinsky District.
