= Shelekhovsky District =

Shelekhovsky District Шелеховский район (Russian)
- District
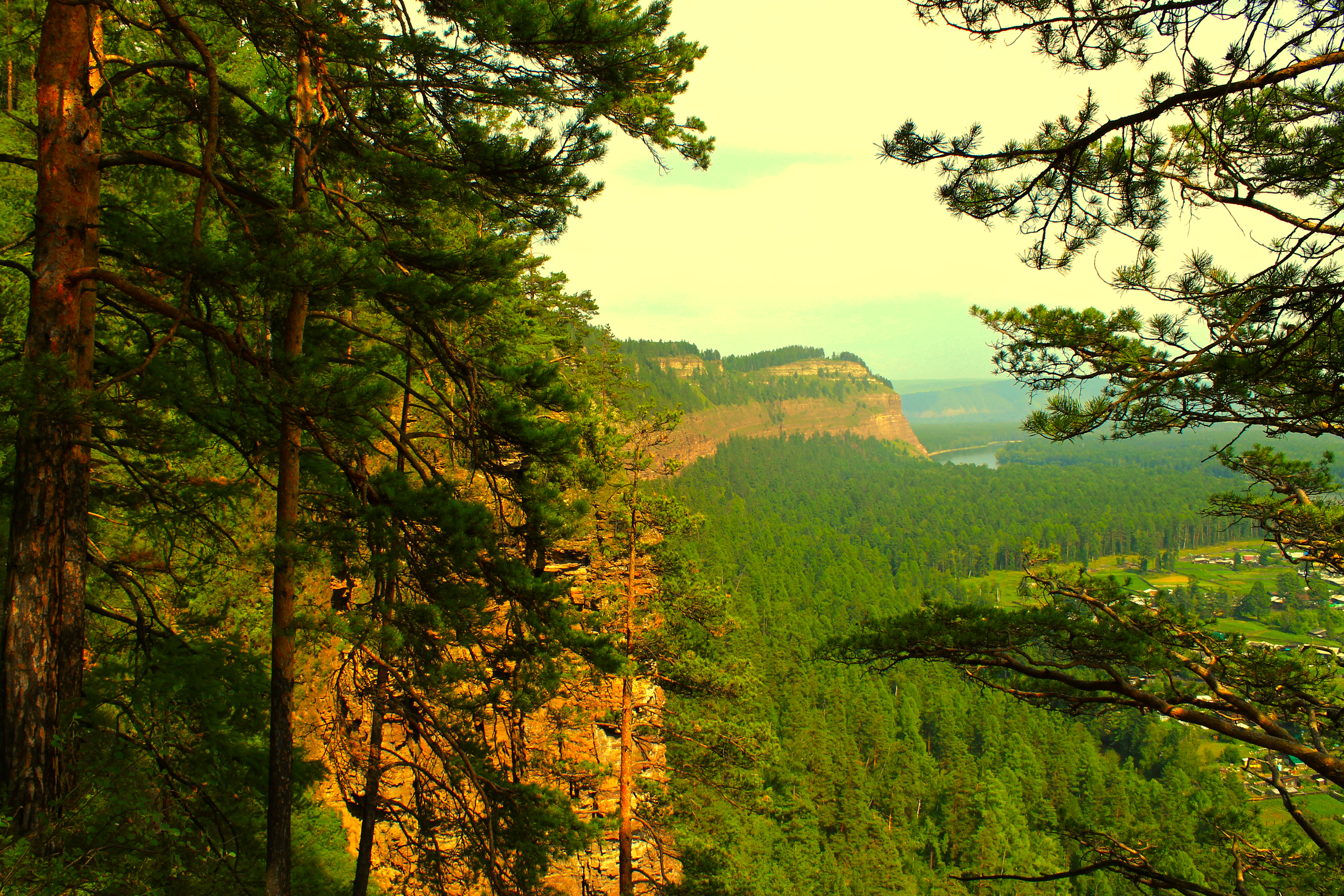
- Shaman Rock (cliff), Shelokhovsky District

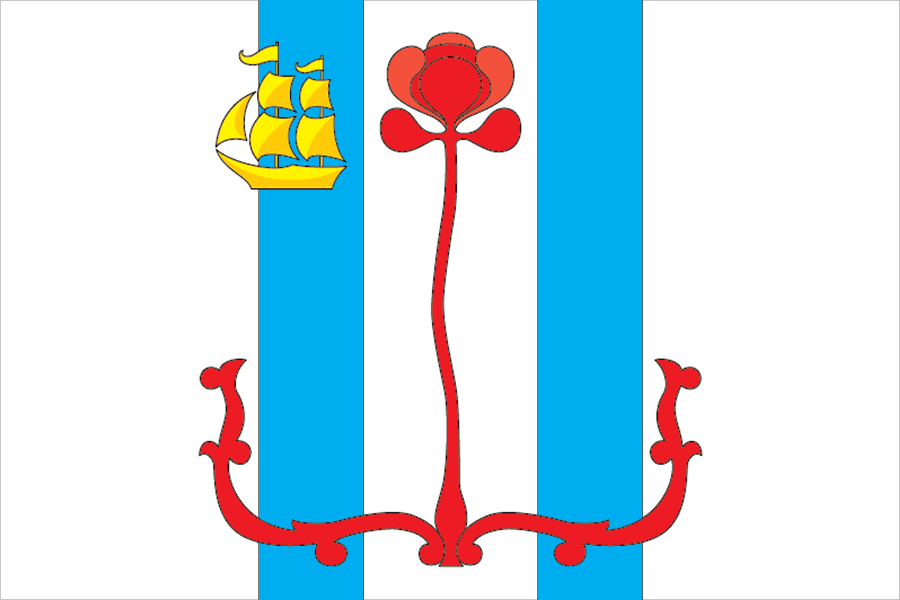
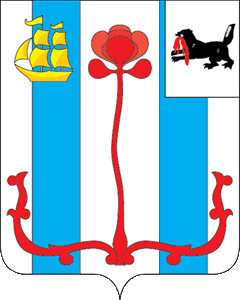
- Flag Coat of arms
- Location of Shelekhovsky District (#32) in Irkutsk Oblast
- Coordinates: 52°02′N 103°58′E
- Country: Russia
- Federal subject: Irkutsk Oblast
- Established: 20 January 1993
- Administrative center: Shelekhov

Area
  - Total: 2,020 km^{2} (780 sq mi)

Population (2010 Census)
  - Total: 14,435
  - Density: 7.15/km^{2} (18.5/sq mi)
  - Urban: 34.7%
  - Rural: 65.3%

Administrative structure
  - Inhabited localities: 1 cities/towns, 1 urban-type settlements, 24 rural localities

Municipal structure
  - Municipally incorporated as: Shelekhovsky Municipal District
  - Municipal divisions: 2 urban settlements, 4 rural settlements
- Time zone: UTC+8 (MSK+5)
- OKTMO ID: 25655000
- Website: http://www.sheladm.ru

Shelekhovsky District (Russian: Ше́леховский райо́н) is an administrative district, one of the thirty-three in Irkutsk Oblast, Russia. Municipally, it is incorporated as Shelekhovsky Municipal District. It is located in the south of the oblast. The area of the district is 2,020 square kilometers (780 sq mi). Its administrative center is the town of Shelekhov. Population: 14,435 (2010 census); 11,836 (2002 Census).

== Administrative and municipal status ==
Within the framework of administrative divisions, Shelekhovsky District is one of the thirty-three in the oblast. The town of Shelekhov serves as its administrative center. As a municipal division, the district is incorporated as Shelekhovsky Municipal District.
