= Nizhneilimsky District =

Nizhneilimsky District Нижнеилимский район (Russian)
- District
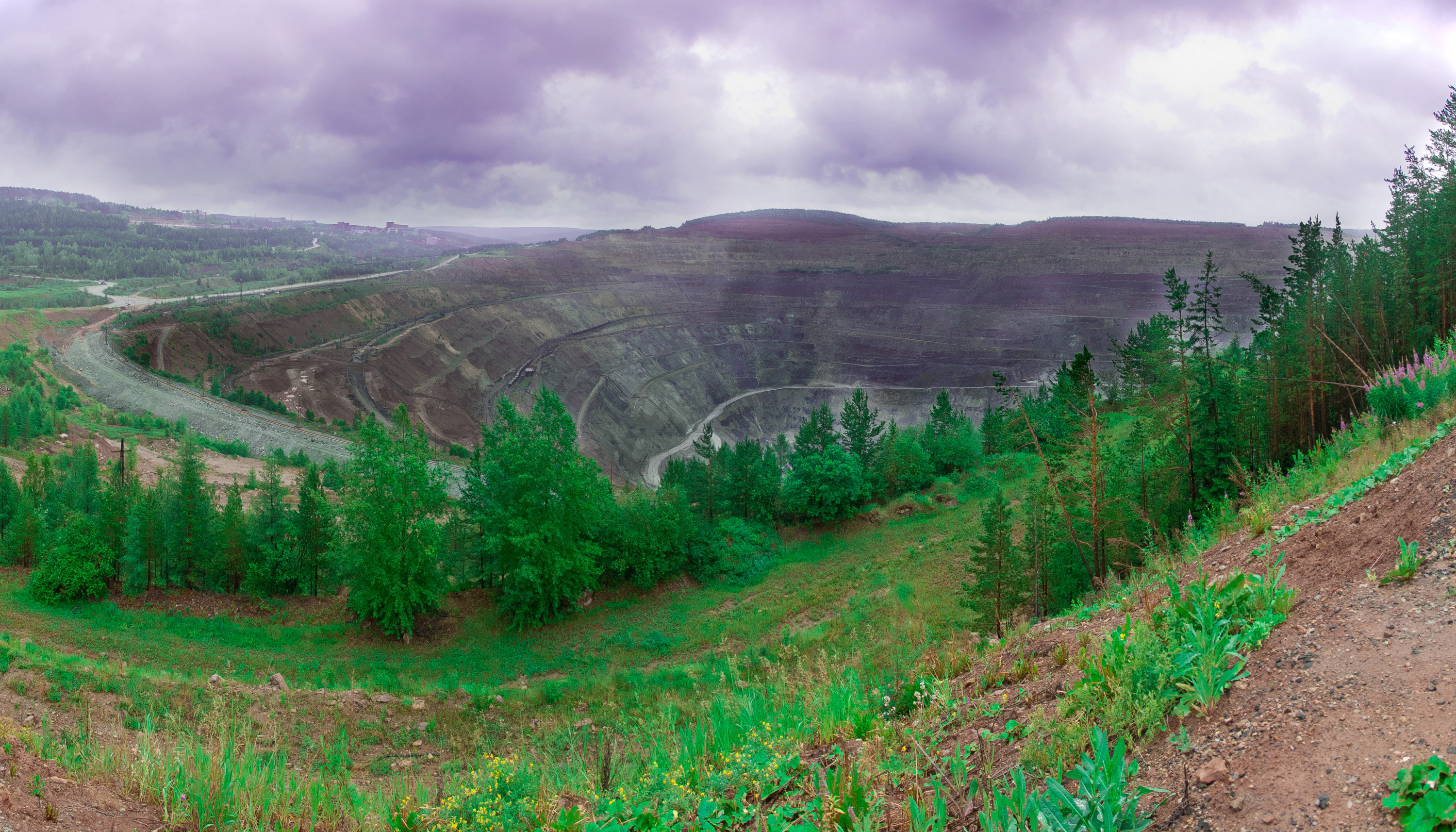
- Korshunovsky, Nizhneilimsky District

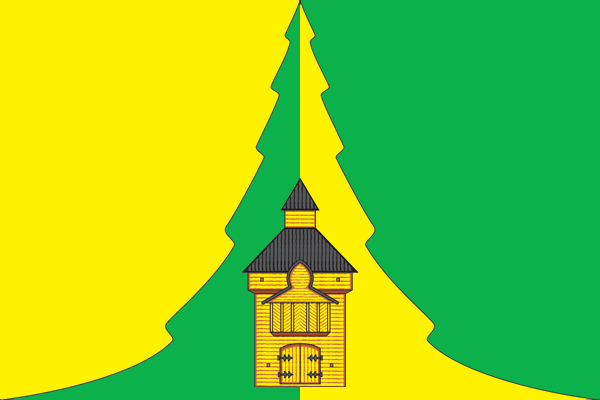
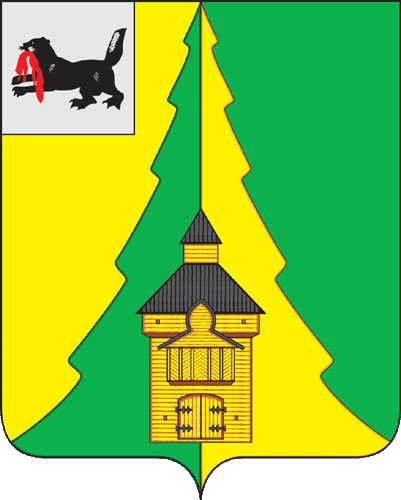
- Flag Coat of arms
- Location of Nizhneilimsky District (#18) in northwest Irkutsk Oblast
- Coordinates: 56°35′N 104°07′E
- Country: Russia
- Federal subject: Irkutsk Oblast
- Established: 28 June 1926
- Administrative center: Zheleznogorsk-Ilimsky

Area
  - Total: 36,823 km^{2} (14,217 sq mi)

Population (2010 Census)
  - Total: 55,096
  - Density: 1.4962/km^{2} (3.8752/sq mi)
  - Urban: 82.7%
  - Rural: 17.3%

Administrative structure
  - Inhabited localities: 1 cities/towns, 7 urban-type settlements, 22 rural localities

Municipal structure
  - Municipally incorporated as: Nizhneilimsky Municipal District
  - Municipal divisions: 8 urban settlements, 9 rural settlements
- Time zone: UTC+8 (MSK+5)
- OKTMO ID: 25626000
- Website: http://nilim.irkobl.ru/

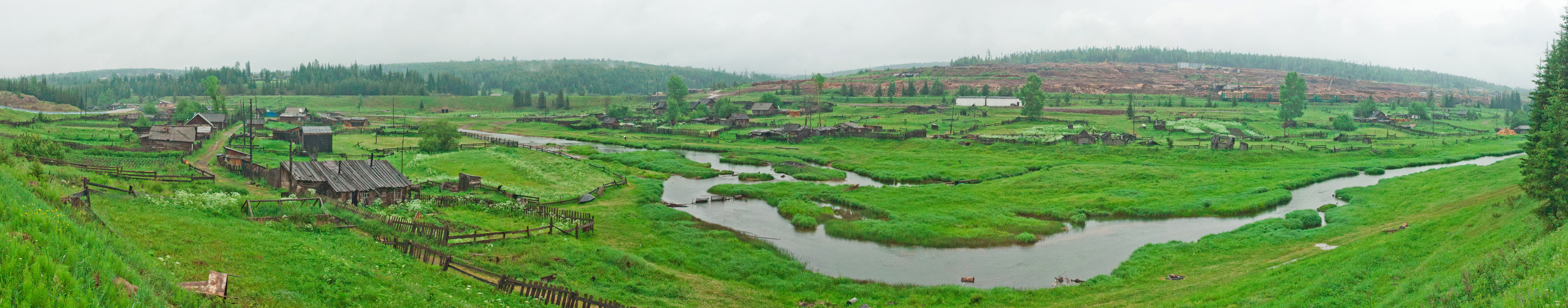
Vidim, Nizhneilimsky District

Nizhneilimsky District (Russian: Нижнеили́мский райо́н) is an administrative district, one of the thirty-three in Irkutsk Oblast, Russia. Municipally, it is incorporated as Nizhneilimsky Municipal District. The area of the district is 36,823 square kilometers (14,217 sq mi). Its administrative center is the town of Zheleznogorsk-Ilimsky. Population: 55,096 (2010 census); 63,727 (2002 Census); 77,291 (1989 Soviet census).

== Administrative and municipal status ==
Within the framework of administrative divisions, Nizhneilimsky District is one of the thirty-three in the oblast. The town of Zheleznogorsk-Ilimsky serves as its administrative center.

As a municipal division, the district is incorporated as Nizhneilimsky Municipal District.
