= Nizhneudinsky District =

Nizhneudinsky District Нижнеудинский район (Russian)
- District
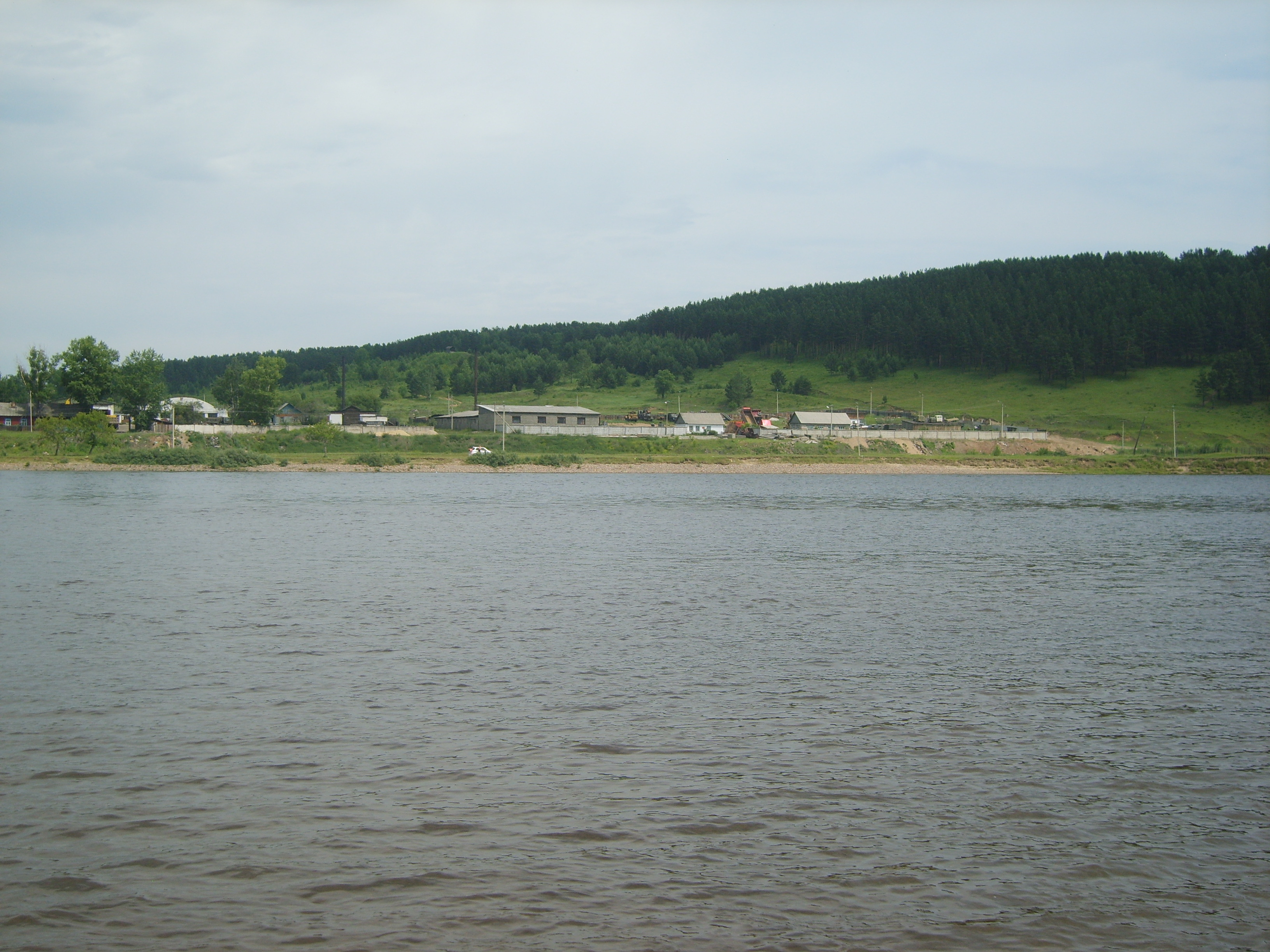
- Uda, Nizhneudinsky District

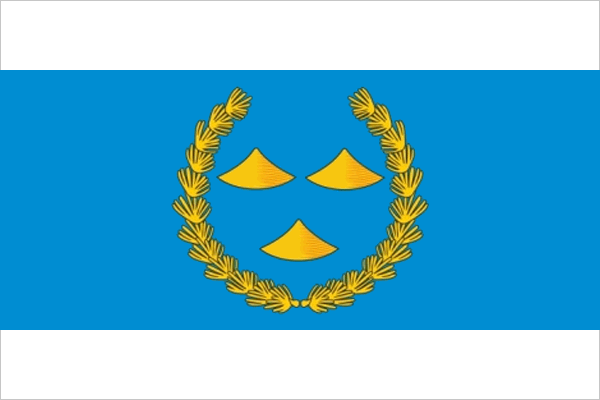
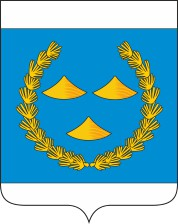
- Flag Coat of arms
- Location of Nizhneudinsky District (#19) in southwest Irkutsk Oblast
- Coordinates: 54°54′N 99°01′E
- Country: Russia
- Federal subject: Irkutsk Oblast
- Established: 1924
- Administrative center: Nizhneudinsk

Area
  - Total: 50,000 km^{2} (19,000 sq mi)

Population (2010 Census)
  - Total: 25,694
  - Density: 0.51/km^{2} (1.3/sq mi)
  - Urban: 24.7%
  - Rural: 75.3%

Administrative structure
  - Inhabited localities: 2 cities/towns, 3 urban-type settlements, 83 rural localities

Municipal structure
  - Municipally incorporated as: Nizhneudinsky Municipal District
  - Municipal divisions: 5 urban settlements, 18 rural settlements
- Time zone: UTC+8 (MSK+5)
- OKTMO ID: 25628000
- Website: http://www.nuradm.ru

Nizhneudinsky District (Russian: Нижнеу́динский райо́н) is an administrative district, one of the thirty-three in Irkutsk Oblast, Russia. Municipally, it is incorporated as Nizhneudinsky Municipal District. The area of the district is 50,000 square kilometers (19,000 sq mi). Its administrative center is the town of Nizhneudinsk. Population: 25,694 (2010 census); 31,122 (2002 Census); 37,293 (1989 Soviet census).

== Administrative and municipal status ==
Within the framework of administrative divisions, Nizhneudinsky District is one of the thirty-three in the oblast. The town of Nizhneudinsk serves as its administrative center. As a municipal division, the district is incorporated as Nizhneudinsky Municipal District.

The territory of Tofalariya is a small historical and cultural region located in the southwestern part of Nizhneudinsky District.
