= Tayshetsky District =

Tayshetsky District Тайшетский район (Russian)
- District
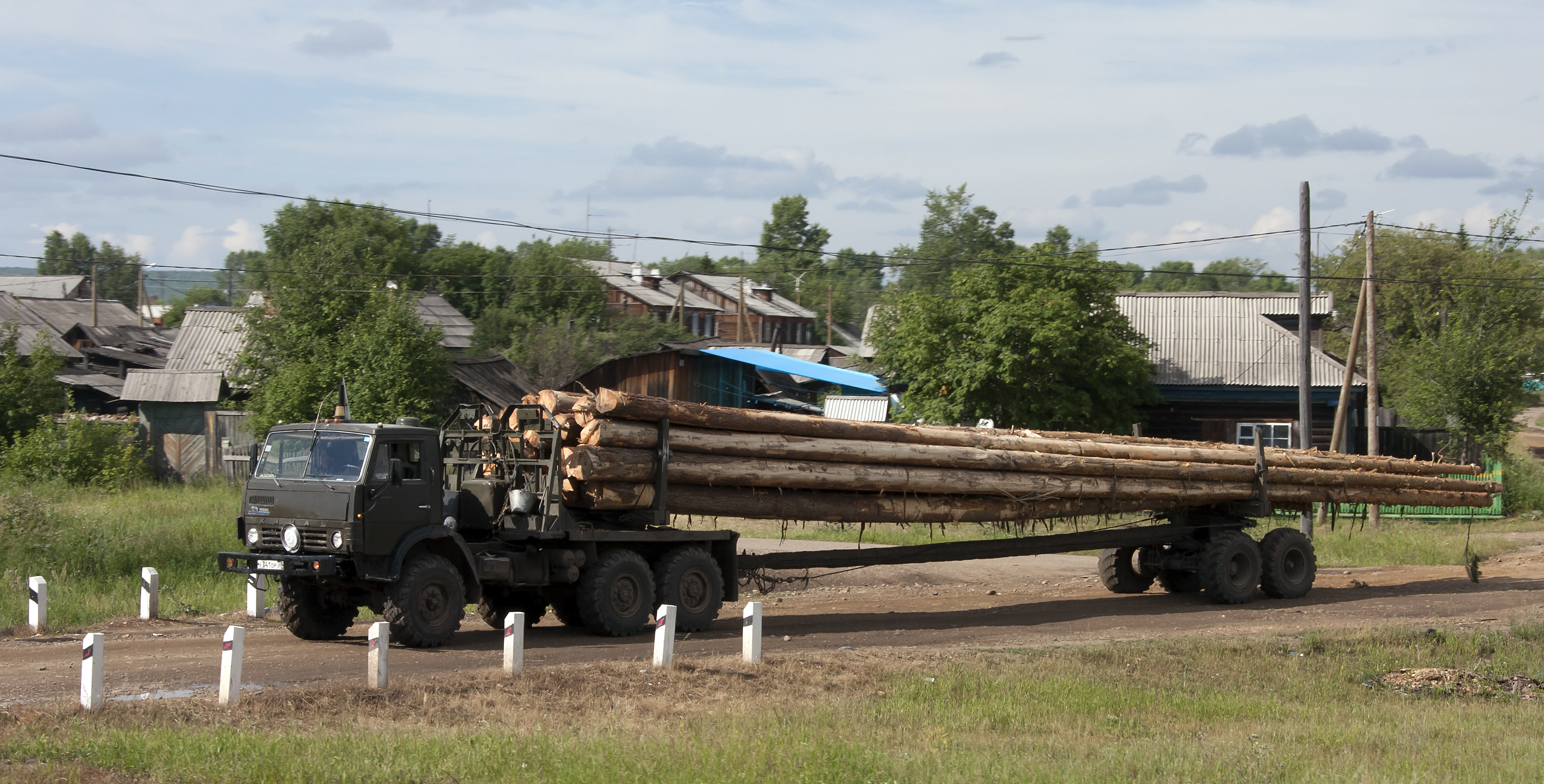
- Lumber transport in Yurty. Tayshetsky District

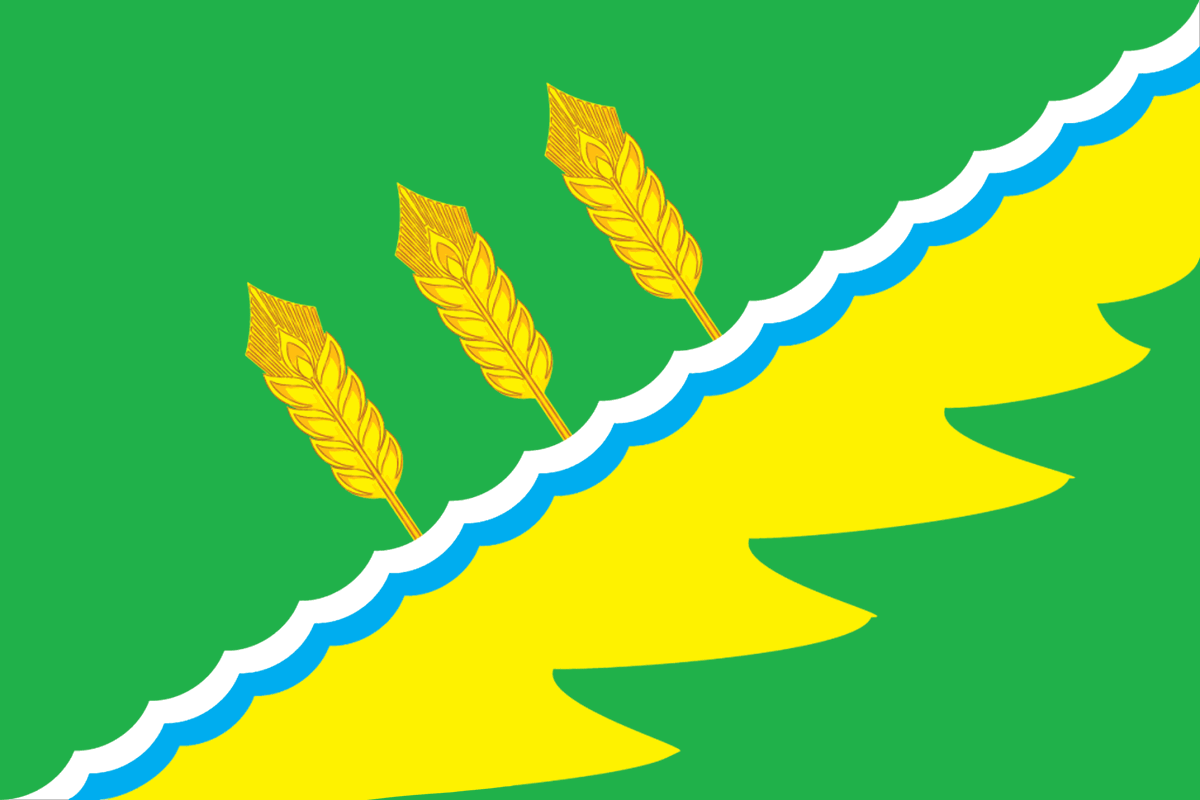
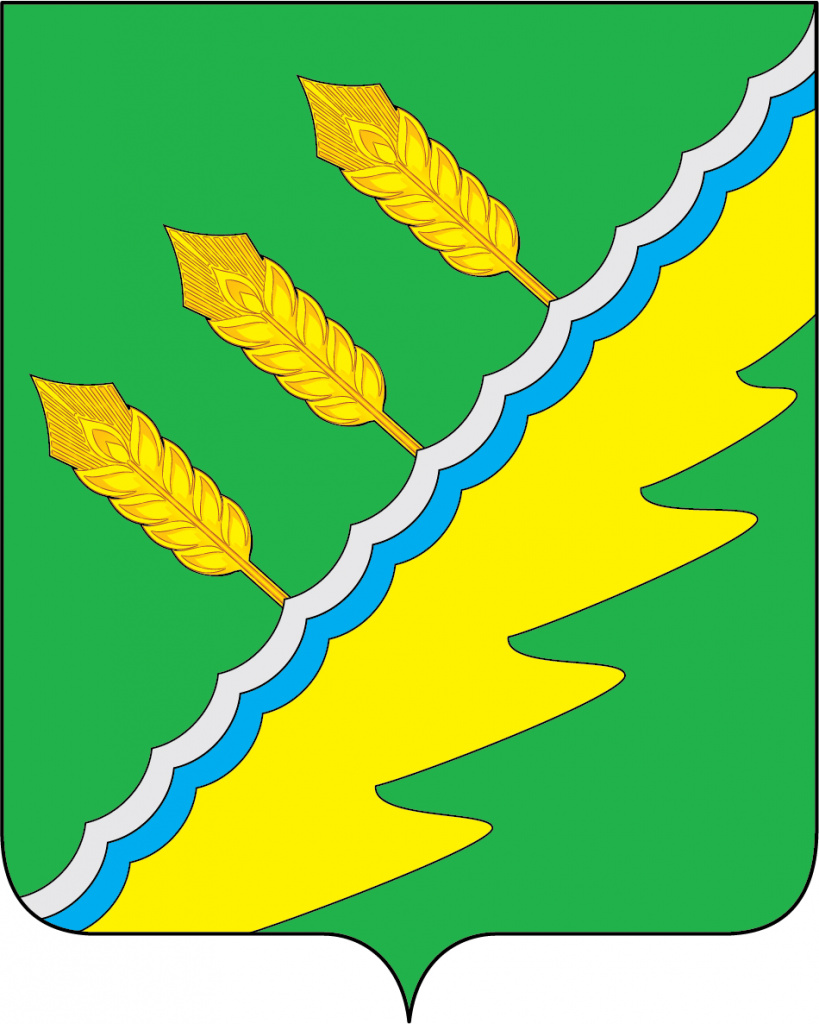
- Flag Coat of arms
- Location of Tayshetsky District (#24) in western Irkutsk Oblast
- Coordinates: 55°56′N 98°01′E
- Country: Russia
- Federal subject: Irkutsk Oblast
- Established: 25 May 1925
- Administrative center: Tayshet

Area
  - Total: 27,800 km^{2} (10,700 sq mi)

Population (2010 Census)
  - Total: 29,752
  - Density: 1.07/km^{2} (2.77/sq mi)
  - Urban: 32.3%
  - Rural: 67.7%

Administrative structure
  - Inhabited localities: 2 cities/towns, 4 urban-type settlements, 82 rural localities

Municipal structure
  - Municipally incorporated as: Tayshetsky Municipal District
  - Municipal divisions: 6 urban settlements, 25 rural settlements
- Time zone: UTC+8 (MSK+5)
- OKTMO ID: 25636000
- Website: http://taishet.irkmo.ru/

Tayshetsky District (Russian: Тайшетский райо́н) is an administrative district, one of the thirty-three in Irkutsk Oblast, Russia. Municipally, it is incorporated as Tayshetsky Municipal District. It is located in the west of the oblast. The area of the district is 27,800 square kilometers (10,700 sq mi). Its administrative center is the town of Tayshet. Population: 29,752 (2010 census); 36,502 (2002 Census); 35,236 (1989 Soviet census).

== Administrative and municipal status ==
Within the framework of administrative divisions, Tayshetsky District is one of the thirty-three in the oblast. The town of Tayshet serves as its administrative center. As a municipal division, the district is incorporated as Tayshetsky Municipal District.
