= Shelekhov constituency =

Constituency of the State Duma of the Russian Federation

Shelekhov single-member constituency
- Constituency of the Russian State Duma

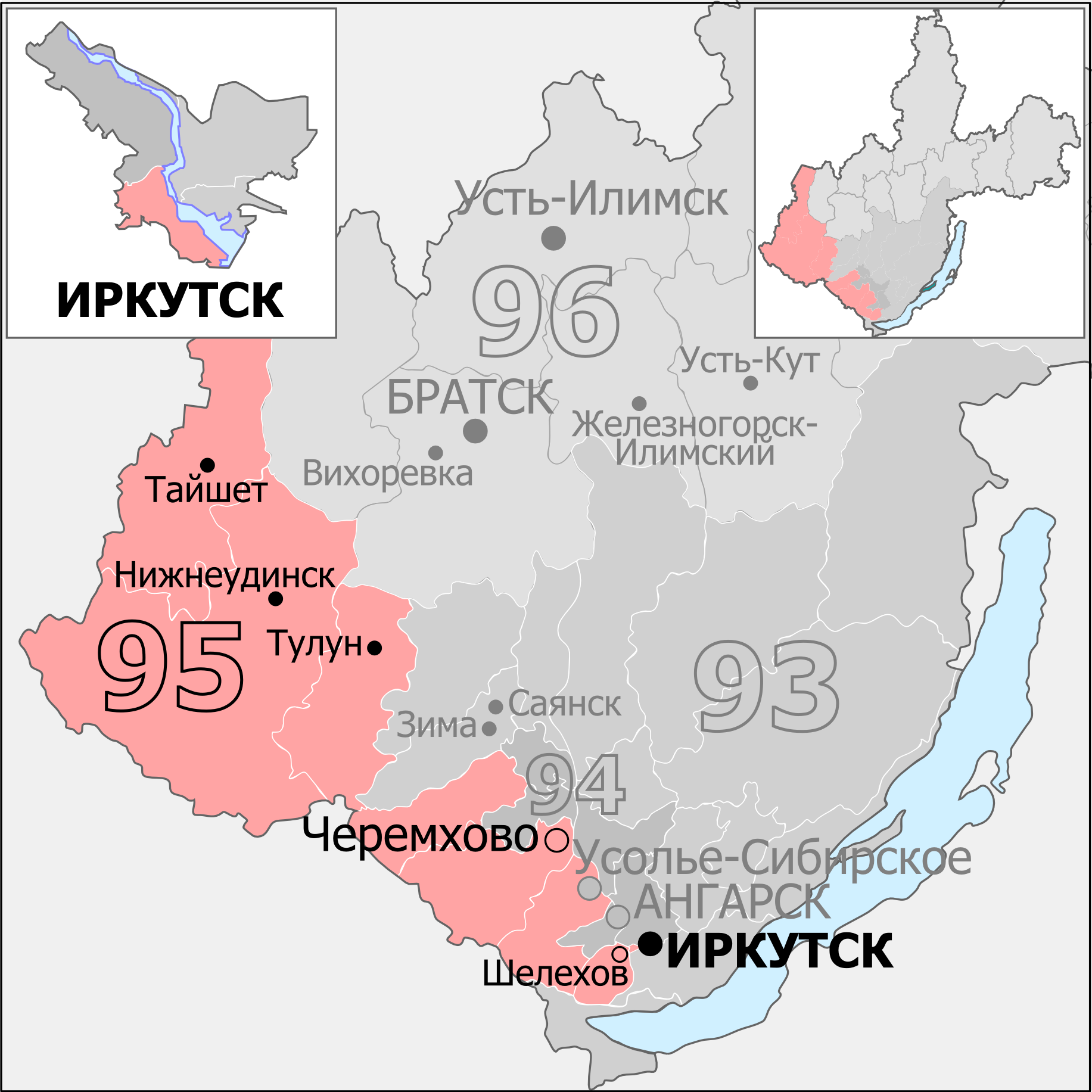
- Constituency boundaries since 2016
- Deputy: Sergey Ten; United Russia
- Federal subject: Irkutsk Oblast
- Districts: Cheremkhovo, Cheremkhovsky, Irkutsk (Sverdlovsky district), Irkutsky (Smolenskoe), Nizhneudinsky, Shelekhovsky, Tayshetsky, Tulun, Tulunsky, Usolsky, Zalarinsky
- Voters: 461,244 (2026)

The Shelekhov constituency (No.97 (Note: Tulun constituency No.84 in 1993-1995, Tulun constituency No.83 in 1995-2003, No.95 in 2016–2026)) is a Russian legislative constituency in Irkutsk Oblast. The constituency covers southern and western Irkutsk Oblast, stretching from the city of Irkutsk to Tulun and Tayshet along the oblast's southern border.

The constituency has been represented since 2016 by United Russia deputy Sergey Ten, four-term State Duma member, businessman and son of former State Duma member Yury Ten.

== Boundaries ==
1993–1995 Tulun constituency: Balagansky District, Chunsky District, Kuytunsky District, Nizhneudinsk, Nizhneudinsky District, Sayansk, Tayshet, Tayshetsky District, Tulun, Tulunsky District, Ust-Ilimsk, Ust-Ilimsky District, Ust-Udinsky District, Zalarinsky District, Zima, Ziminsky District
The constituency covered western Irkutsk Oblast, stretching from Zima in the south to Ust-Ilimsk in the north and surrounding Bratsky District from the east, and included the cities of Sayansk, Tayshet and Tulun.

1995–2003 Tulun constituency: Chunsky District, Kuytunsky District, Nizhneilimsky District, Nizhneudinsk, Nizhneudinsky District, Sayansk, Tayshet, Tayshetsky District, Tulun, Tulunsky District, Ust-Ilimsk, Ust-Ilimsky District, Zalarinsky District, Zima, Ziminsky District
The constituency was slightly altered following the 1995 redistricting, swapping Balagansky and Ust-Udinsky districts for Nizhneilimsky District with Bratsk constituency.

2016–present: Cheremkhovo, Cheremkhovsky District, Irkutsk (Sverdlovsky district), Irkutsky District (Smolenskoye), Nizhneudinsky District, Shelekhovsky District, Tayshetsky District, Tulun, Tulunsky District, Usolsky District, Zalarinsky District
The constituency was re-created for the 2016 election under the name "Shelekhov constituency" and retained only westernmost Irkutsk Oblast, losing districts around Bratsk to Bratsk constituency, and Zima and Sayansk to Irkutsk constituency. This seat instead stretched southwards, gaining Cheremkhovo from Angarsk constituency, Sverdlovsky city district of Irkutsk and Shelekhov from Irkutsk constituency.

== Members elected ==
Election	Member	Party
1993	Anatoly Turusin	Agrarian Party
1995	Anatoly Turusin	Agrarian Party
1999	Sergey Kolesnikov	Independent
2003	Constituency eliminated	
2007	Proportional representation - no election by constituency	
2011	Proportional representation - no election by constituency	
2016	Sergey Ten	United Russia
2021	Sergey Ten	United Russia
2026	Sergey Ten	United Russia

== Election results ==
=== 1993 ===
Summary of the 12 December 1993 Russian legislative election in the Tulun constituency
Candidate	Party	Votes	%
Anatoly Turusin	Agrarian Party	84,656	38.14%
Mikhail Stupin	Independent	–	18.58%
Anatoly Krulikovsky	Independent	–	–
Oleg Voronin	Party of Russian Unity and Accord	–	–
Total		221,933	100%

=== 1995 ===
Summary of the 17 December 1995 Russian legislative election in the Tulun constituency
Candidate	Party	Votes	%
Anatoly Turusin (incumbent)	Agrarian Party	109,193	39.03%
Sergey Kudryavtsev	Liberal Democratic Party	52,006	18.59%
Vladimir Ganzha	Independent	43,965	15.72%
Leonid Chernyshov	Union of Workers of ZhKKh	30,663	10.96%
against all		39,169	14.00%
Total		279,749	100%

=== 1999 ===
Summary of the 19 December 1999 Russian legislative election in the Tulun constituency
Candidate	Party	Votes	%
Sergey Kolesnikov	Independent	112,159	44.79%
Anatoly Turusin (incumbent)	Communist Party	42,274	16.88%
Aleksandr Gamayunov	Independent	17,482	6.98%
Ivan Zelent	Independent	12,869	5.14%
Aleksandr Tolstoukhov	Spiritual Heritage	10,415	4.16%
Yury Gurtovoy	Independent	9,380	3.75%
Nikolay Kuryanovich	Liberal Democratic Party	8,130	3.25%
Yury Zolotukhin	Yabloko	6,539	2.61%
Anatoly Dubas	Independent	5,141	2.05%
Sergey Smolich	Andrey Nikolayev and Svyatoslav Fyodorov Bloc	924	0.37%
against all		21,073	8.42%
Total		250,402	100%

=== 2016 ===
Summary of the 18 September 2016 Russian legislative election in the Shelekhov constituency
Candidate	Party	Votes	%
Sergey Ten	United Russia	72,660	42.34%
Anton Romanov	Communist Party	31,494	18.35%
Ivan Grachev	Party of Growth	20,033	11.67%
Dmitry Yershov	Liberal Democratic Party	12,089	7.04%
Leonid Karnaukhov	Communists of Russia	6,602	3.85%
Georgy Komarov	A Just Russia	5,074	2.96%
Vladimir Alekseyev	Yabloko	4,766	2.78%
Mikhail Vasilyev	People's Freedom Party	3,543	2.06%
Nikolay Chumak	Rodina	3,284	1.91%
Yury Yelokhin	The Greens	1,888	1.10%
Nikolay Ignatyev	Civic Platform	1,651	0.96%
Vasily Pronichev	Patriots of Russia	1,442	0.84%
Nikolay Kostyukov	Civilian Power	610	0.36%
Total		171,692	100%

=== 2021 ===
Summary of the 17-19 September 2021 Russian legislative election in the Shelekhov constituency
Candidate	Party	Votes	%
Sergey Ten (incumbent)	United Russia	70,071	40.56%
Viktor Kondrashov	Communist Party	37,873	21.92%
Maksim Devochkin	Liberal Democratic Party	15,181	8.79%
Sergey Kondratyev	Communists of Russia	10,977	6.35%
Ivan Savushkin	New People	9,514	5.51%
Grigory Krasovsky	Party of Pensioners	5,472	3.17%
Dmitry Didenov	A Just Russia — For Truth	4,719	2.73%
Yelena Stepanova	The Greens	3,228	1.87%
Ilya Artemyev	Party of Growth	2,988	1.73%
Grigory Vakulenko	Civic Platform	2,025	1.17%
Anna Shlomina	Yabloko	1,956	1.13%
Total		172,741	100%

=== 2026 ===
Summary of the 18-20 September 2026 Russian legislative election in the Shelekhov constituency
Candidate	Party	Votes	%
Sergey Ten (incumbent)	United Russia	79,093	43.95%
Ilya Sumarokov	Communist Party	30,804	17.12%
Sergey Lipin	New People	14,726	8.18%
Roman Golyshev	Liberal Democratic Party	10,637	5.91%
Aleksey Samorokov	Communists of Russia	10,190	5.66%
Marina Komarova	A Just Russia	8,801	4.89%
Pyotr Mekhonoshin	Yabloko	7,215	4.01%
Grigory Krasovsky	Party of Pensioners	4,942	2.75%
Yelena Abaturova	The Greens	4,264	2.37%
Aleksey Molchanov	Party of Direct Democracy	1,714	0.95%
Total		179,981	100%
