= Irkutsk constituency =

Russian legislative constituency

Irkutsk single-member constituency
- Constituency of the Russian State Duma
- Deputy: Alexander Yakubovsky; United Russia
- Federal subject: Irkutsk Oblast
- Districts: Balagansky, Bayandayevsky, Ekhirit-Bulagatsky, Irkutsk (Kirovsky, Kuybyshevsky and Oktyabrsky districts), Irkutsky (Bolsherechenskoe, Dzerzhniskoe, Goloustnenskoe, Listvyanskoe, Markovskoe, Molodyozhnoe, Ushakovskoe), Kachugsky, Kuytunsky, Olkhonsky, Osinsky Sayansk, Slyudyansky, Ust-Udinsky, Zhigalovsky, Zima, Ziminsky
- Voters: 464,908 (2026)

The Irkutsk constituency (No.95 (Note: No.83 in 1993-1995, No.82 in 1995-2003, No.84 in 2003-2007, No.93 in 2016–2026)) is a Russian legislative constituency in Irkutsk Oblast. The constituency covers part of Irkutsk on the right bank of Angara as well as sparsely populated central Irkutsk Oblast.

The constituency has been represented since 2026 by United Russia deputy Alexander Yakubovsky, three-term State Duma member, businessman and son of former Irkutsk mayor Vladimir Yakubovsky, who won the open seat left vacant following the resignation of two-term Communist deputy Mikhail Shchapov in September 2025.

== Boundaries ==
1993–1995: Irkutsk, Shelekhov, Shelekhovsky District
The constituency covered the entirety of oblast capital Irkutsk, its industrial satellite city Shelekhov to the south and Shelekhovsky District.

1995–2003: Irkutsk
The constituency was significantly altered following the 1995 redistricting, retaining only Irkutsk and losing the rest to Angarsk constituency.

2003–2007: Irkutsk, Irkutsky District, Kachugsky District, Olkhonsky District, Shelekhov, Slyudyansky District
After the 2003 redistricting Irkutsk Oblast lost one of its four constituencies, so all remaining seats saw major changes. The constituency retained all of Irkutsk and gained rural territories to the north (Irkutsky, Kachugsky and Olkhonsky districts from Bratsk constituency and south (Shelekhov and Slyudyansky District from Angarsk constituency) of the city.

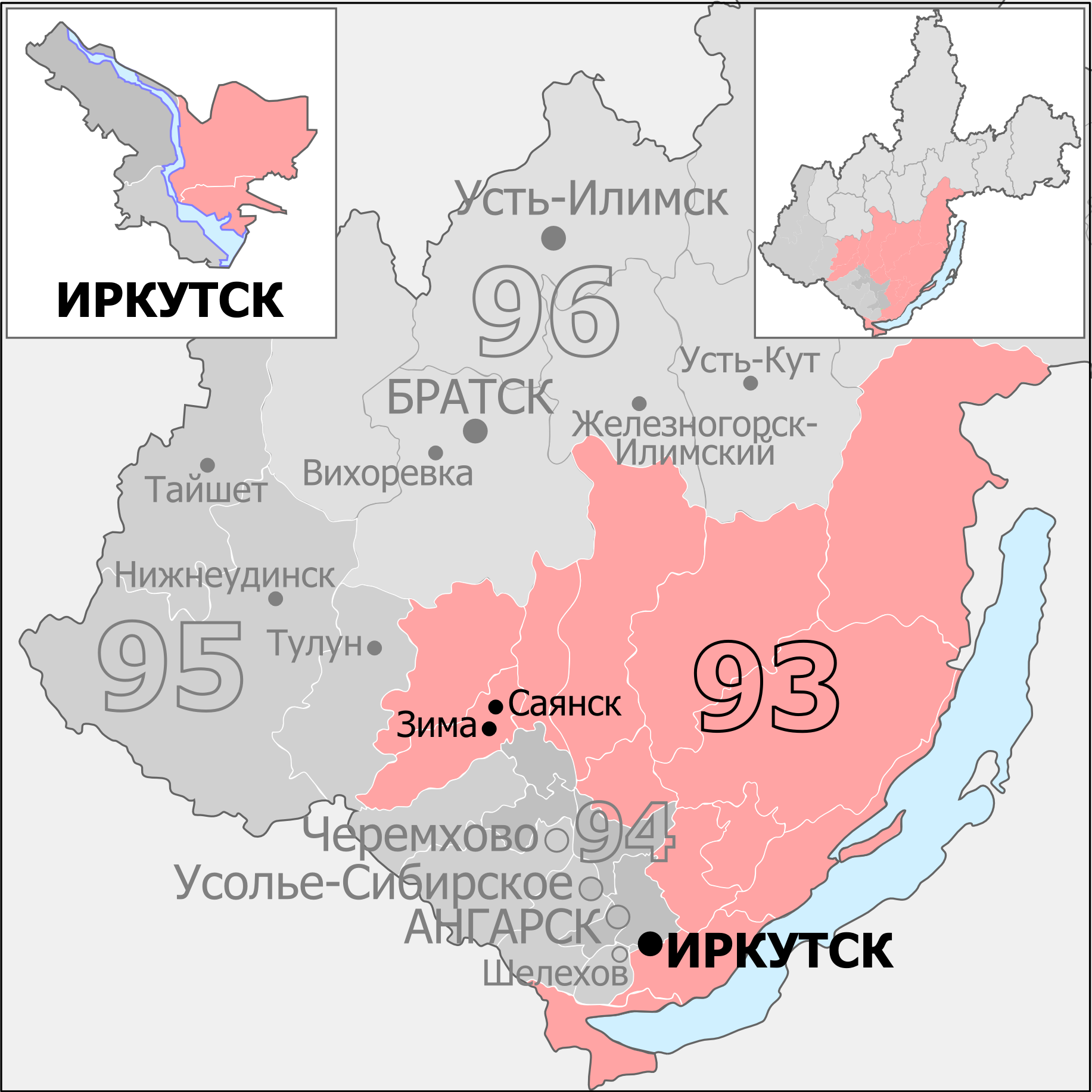
Constituency boundaries from 2016 to 2026

2016–2026: Balagansky District, Bayandayevsky District, Ekhirit-Bulagatsky District, Irkutsk (Kirovsky, Kuybyshevsky and Oktyabrsky districts), Irkutsky District (Bolsherechenskoye, Dzerzhniskoye, Goloustnenskoye, Listvyanskoye, Markovskoye, Molodyozhnoye, Ushakovskoye), Kachugsky District, Kazachinsko-Lensky District, Kuytunsky District, Olkhonsky District, Osinsky District, Sayansk, Slyudyansky District, Ust-Udinsky District, Zhigalovsky District, Zima, Ziminsky District
The constituency was re-created for the 2016 election and retained only half of Irkutsk on the right bank of Angara, half of Irkutsky District and ruralities to the north and south, losing Leninsky city district of Irkutsk and half of Irkutsky District to Angarsk constituency, Sverdlovsky city district of Irkutsk and Shelekhov to Shelekhov constituency. This seat instead gained sparsely populated central Irkutsk Oblast from Bratsk constituency, industrial cities Sayansk and Zima from Angarsk constituency and half of the eliminated Ust-Orda Buryat constituency.

2026–present: Balagansky District, Bayandayevsky District, Ekhirit-Bulagatsky District, Irkutsk (Kirovsky, Kuybyshevsky and Oktyabrsky districts), Irkutsky District (Bolsherechenskoye, Dzerzhniskoye, Goloustnenskoye, Listvyanskoye, Markovskoye, Molodyozhnoye, Ushakovskoye), Kachugsky District, Kuytunsky District, Olkhonsky District, Osinsky District, Sayansk, Slyudyansky District, Ust-Udinsky District, Zhigalovsky District, Zima, Ziminsky District
After the 2025 redistricting the constituency saw minor changes, only losing Kazachinsko-Lensky District in its northern corner to Bratsk constituency.

== Members elected ==
Election	Member	Party
1993	Yury Ten (Note: died in July 2003)	Independent
1995	Yury Ten	Our Home – Russia
1999	Yury Ten	Our Home – Russia
2003	Sergey Dubrovin	Independent
2007	Proportional representation - no election by constituency	
2011	Proportional representation - no election by constituency	
2016	Mikhail Shchapov (Note: appointed Auditor of the Accounts Chamber of Russia in September 2025)	Communist Party
2021	Mikhail Shchapov	Communist Party
2026	Alexander Yakubovsky	United Russia

== Election results ==
=== 1993 ===
Summary of the 12 December 1993 Russian legislative election in the Irkutsk constituency
Candidate	Party	Votes	%
Yury Ten	Independent	54,736	26.83%
Yury Shevelev	Independent	–	21.00%
Igor Kalinichenko	Choice of Russia	–	–
Vyacheslav Samsonov	Civic Union	–	–
Vladimir Tatarnikov	Independent	–	–
Valery Zarubin	Independent	–	–
Total		204,042	100%

=== 1995 ===
Summary of the 17 December 1995 Russian legislative election in the Irkutsk constituency
Candidate	Party	Votes	%
Yury Ten (incumbent)	Our Home – Russia	109,794	48.62%
Anton Romanov	Independent	36,396	16.12%
Gennady Alekseyev	Independent	20,002	8.86%
Valery Khayryuzov	Congress of Russian Communities	13,427	5.95%
Aleksandr Lukin	Stable Russia	6,300	2.79%
Natalya Noskova	Liberal Democratic Party	6,266	2.77%
Vladimir Shipov	Serving Russia	5,066	2.24%
Andrey Kunitsyn	Beer Lovers Party	3,029	1.34%
Ivan Grudinin	Independent	2,473	1.10%
Boris Artemyev	Independent	1,058	0.47%
against all		18,082	8.01%
Total		225,807	100%

=== 1999 ===
Summary of the 19 December 1999 Russian legislative election in the Irkutsk constituency
Candidate	Party	Votes	%
Yury Ten (incumbent)	Our Home – Russia	37,573	16.75%
Geliy Zherebtsov	Fatherland – All Russia	32,326	14.41%
Yevgeny Polyntsev	Independent	31,931	14.23%
Vera Savchuk	Communist Party	31,230	13.92%
Gennady Istomin	Independent	19,303	8.60%
Yury Shevelev	Independent	13,717	6.11%
Anton Romanov	Independent	13,399	5.97%
Anatoly Khromykh	Yabloko	9,426	4.20%
Nikolay Oskirko	Liberal Democratic Party	4,261	1.90%
Valery Khayryuzov	Movement in Support of the Army	3,206	1.43%
Yury Repkin	Spiritual Heritage	378	0.17%
against all		24,470	10.91%
Total		224,365	100%

=== 2003 ===
Summary of the 7 December 2003 Russian legislative election in the Irkutsk constituency
Candidate	Party	Votes	%
Sergey Dubrovin	Independent	57,824	22.52%
Sergey Levchenko	Communist Party	44,296	17.25%
Anton Romanov	Independent	25,028	9.75%
Konstantin Volkov	Independent	19,279	7.51%
Yury Korenev	Independent	13,979	5.44%
Aleksandr Balashov	Yabloko	12,663	4.93%
Andrey Kuzin	Party of Russia's Rebirth-Russian Party of Life	11,648	4.54%
Yelena Safonova	Independent	10,742	4.18%
Nikolay Kuryanovich	Liberal Democratic Party	8,503	3.31%
Aleksandr Turik	Independent	7,132	2.78%
Ildus Galyautdinov	Independent	3,498	1.36%
Nikolay Oskirko	Independent	2,779	1.08%
Oleg Gendin	Independent	2,691	1.05%
against all		33,480	13.04%
Total		257,096	100%

=== 2016 ===
Summary of the 18 September 2016 Russian legislative election in the Irkutsk constituency
Candidate	Party	Votes	%
Mikhail Shchapov	Communist Party	60,604	34.45%
Oleg Kankov	United Russia	53,473	30.40%
Larisa Yegorova	A Just Russia	16,616	9.45%
Viktor Galitskov	Liberal Democratic Party	13,800	7.85%
Yury Kankov	Civic Platform	4,235	2.41%
Maksim Yevdokimov	Rodina	3,972	2.26%
Sergey Bespalov	People's Freedom Party	3,878	2.20%
Larisa Kazakova	Yabloko	3,816	2.17%
Viktor Yemelyanov	The Greens	3,061	1.74%
Aleksandr Ilyin	Party of Growth	2,441	1.39%
Sergey Yakubov	Patriots of Russia	1,712	0.97%
Total		175,905	100%

=== 2021 ===
Summary of the 17-19 September 2021 Russian legislative election in the Irkutsk constituency
Candidate	Party	Votes	%
Mikhail Shchapov (incumbent)	Communist Party	93,083	50.77%
Roman Yefremov	United Russia	32,563	17.76%
Aleksandr Deyev	New People	14,384	7.85%
Andrey Dukhovnikov	Liberal Democratic Party	9,978	5.44%
Aleksandr Druzenko	A Just Russia — For Truth	9,497	5.18%
Roman Kuznetsov	Party of Pensioners	7,961	4.34%
Dmitry Boyarsky	Civic Platform	4,466	2.44%
Pavel Kharitonenko	Yabloko	2,705	1.48%
Total		183,346	100%

=== 2026 ===
Summary of the 18-20 September 2026 Russian legislative election in the Irkutsk constituency
Candidate	Party	Votes	%
Alexander Yakubovsky	United Russia	59,137	32.52%
Yevgeny Faizulin	New People	22,670	12.46%
Roman Buyev	Communists of Russia	21,439	11.79%
Andrey Dukhovnikov	Liberal Democratic Party	20,648	11.35%
Pavel Matveyev	A Just Russia	15,017	8.26%
Pavel Kharitonenko	Yabloko	14,483	7.96%
Mikhail Toropov	Party of Pensioners	7,973	4.38%
Yekaterina Anisimova	Party of Direct Democracy	6,016	3.31%
Mikhail Kutelev	The Greens	3,691	2.03%
Valery Makukha	Rodina	2,875	1.58%
Total		181,870	100%
