= Bratsk constituency =

Russian legislative constituency

Bratsk single-member constituency
- Constituency of the Russian State Duma
- Deputy: Oleg Novitsky; Communist Party
- Federal subject: Irkutsk Oblast
- Districts: Bodaybinsky, Bratsk, Bratsky, Chunsky, Katangsky, Kazachinsko-Lensky, Kirensky, Mamsko-Chuysky, Nizhneilimsky, Ust-Ilimsk, Ust-Ilimsky, Ust-Kutsky
- Voters: 398,673 (2026)

The Bratsk constituency (No.98 (Note: No.82 in 1993-1995, No.81 in 1995-2003, No.83 in 2003-2007, No.96 in 2016–2026)) is a Russian legislative constituency in Irkutsk Oblast. The constituency covers northern Irkutsk Oblast, including major industrial centre Bratsk.

The constituency has been represented since 2026 by Communist deputy Oleg Novitsky, retired cosmonaut and Hero of Russia, who won the open seat after two-term United Russia incumbent Alexander Yakubovsky successfully sought re-election in the Irkutsk constituency.

== Boundaries ==
1993–1995: Bodaybinsky District, Bodaybo, Bratsk, Bratsky District, Katangsky District, Kazachinsko-Lensky District, Kirensky District, Mamsko-Chuysky District, Nizhneilimsky District, Ust-Kut, Ust-Kutsky District
The constituency covered sparsely populated northern Irkutsk Oblast, including the industrial cities of Bratsk, Bodaybo and Ust-Kut.

1995–2003: Balagansky District, Bodaybinsky District, Bodaybo, Bratsk, Bratsky District, Irkutsky District, Kachugsky District, Katangsky District, Kazachinsko-Lensky District, Kirensky District, Mamsko-Chuysky District, Olkhonsky District, Ust-Kut, Ust-Kutsky District, Ust-Udinsky District, Zhigalovsky District
The constituency was significantly altered following the 1995 redistricting, swapping Nizhneilimsky District for Balagansky and Ust-Udinsky districts with Tulun constituency. This seat also gained Irkutsky, Kachugsky and Olkhonsky districts in the south from Angarsk constituency.

2003–2007: Balagansky District, Bodaybinsky District, Bodaybo, Bratsk, Bratsky District, Chunsky District, Katangsky District, Kazachinsko-Lensky District, Kirensky District, Mamsko-Chuysky District, Nizhneilimsky District, Tayshet, Tayshetsky District, Ust-Ilimsk, Ust-Ilimsky District, Ust-Kut, Ust-Kutsky District, Ust-Udinsky District, Zhigalovsky District
After the 2003 redistricting Irkutsk Oblast lost one of its four constituencies, so all remaining seats saw major changes. The constituency retained all of its 1993–1995 territory, losing Irkutsky, Kachugsky and Olkhonsky districts to Irkutsk constituency. This seat instead was pushed to the west, gaining western Irkutsk Oblast from the dissolved Tulun constituency.

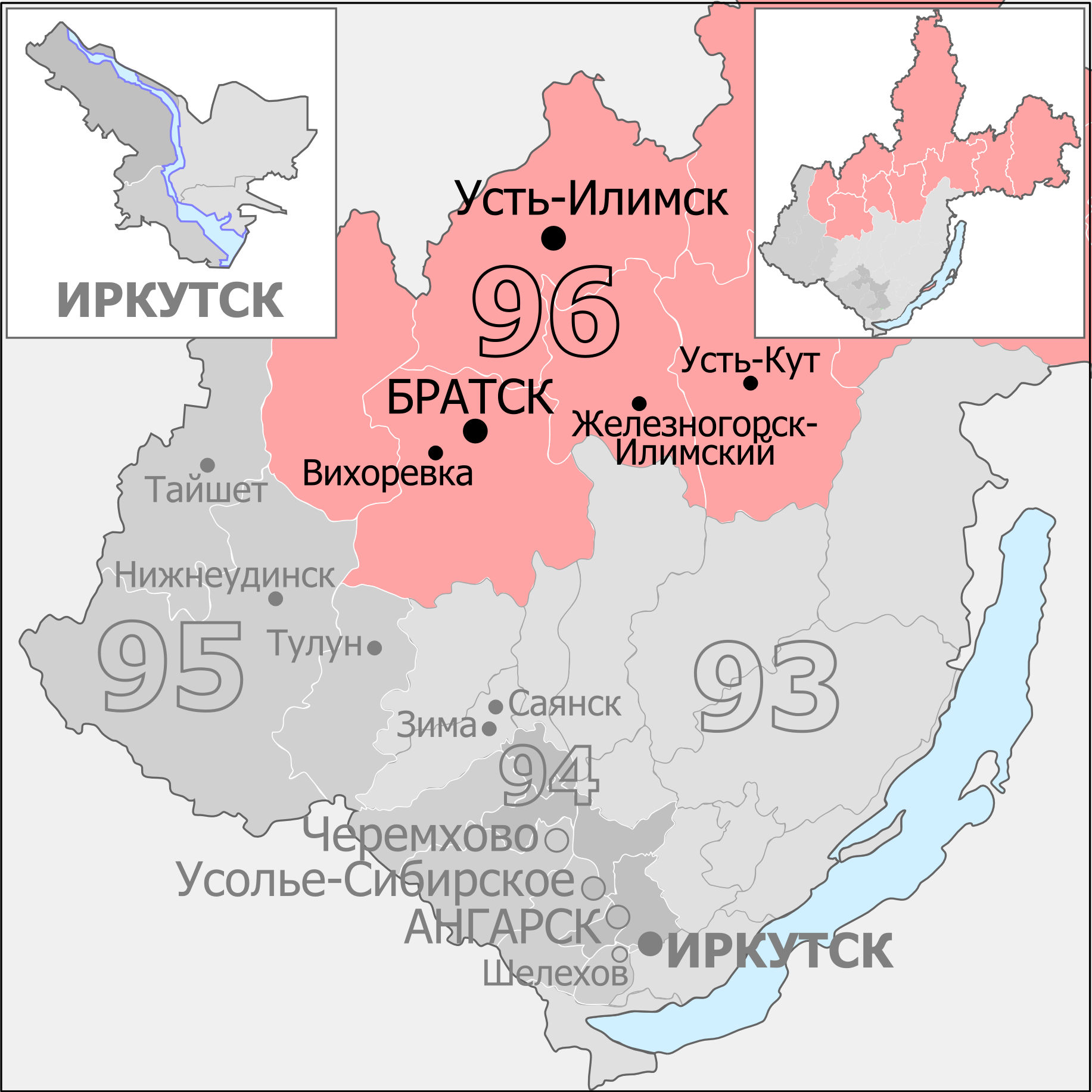
Constituency boundaries from 2016 to 2026

2016–2026: Bodaybinsky District, Bratsk, Bratsky District, Chunsky District, Katangsky District, Kirensky District, Mamsko-Chuysky District, Nizhneilimsky District, Ust-Ilimsk, Ust-Ilimsky District, Ust-Kutsky District
The constituency was re-created for the 2016 election and retained only its northern part, losing Tayshet to Shelekhov constituency and central Irkutsk Oblast to Irkutsk constituency.

2026–present: Bodaybinsky District, Bratsk, Bratsky District, Chunsky District, Katangsky District, Kazachinsko-Lensky District, Kirensky District, Mamsko-Chuysky District, Nizhneilimsky District, Ust-Ilimsk, Ust-Ilimsky District, Ust-Kutsky District
After 2025 redistricting the constituency was slightly changed, gaining Kazachinsko-Lensky District from Irkutsk constituency.

== Members elected ==
Election	Member	Party
1993	Vitaly Shuba	Independent
1995	Vitaly Shuba	Independent
1999	Vitaly Shuba	Fatherland – All Russia
2003	Vitaly Shuba	United Russia
2007	Proportional representation - no election by constituency	
2011	Proportional representation - no election by constituency	
2016	Andrey Chernyshev (Note: appointed to the Federation Council in September 2020)	United Russia
2021	Alexander Yakubovsky	United Russia
2026	Oleg Novitsky	Communist Party

== Election results ==
=== 1993 ===
Summary of the 12 December 1993 Russian legislative election in the Bratsk constituency
Candidate	Party	Votes	%
Vitaly Shuba	Independent	70,313	35.24%
Lyudmila Lokshina	Independent	–	19.83%
Vladimir Anyakin	Choice of Russia	–	–
Anatoly Nikolayev	Agrarian Party	–	–
Anatoly Sundukov	Civic Union	–	–
Total		199,530	100%

=== 1995 ===
Summary of the 17 December 1995 Russian legislative election in the Bratsk constituency
Candidate	Party	Votes	%
Vitaly Shuba (incumbent)	Independent	74,719	27.28%
Nikolay Makarov	Liberal Democratic Party	48,658	17.76%
Vladimir Vikulov	Independent	46,830	17.10%
Vladimir Anyakin	Democratic Choice of Russia – United Democrats	19,082	6.97%
Mikhail Skomarov	Political Movement of Transport Workers	18,628	6.80%
Lev Ponomaryov	Democratic Russia and Free Trade Unions	12,288	4.49%
against all		49,212	17.96%
Total		273,936	100%

=== 1999 ===
Summary of the 19 December 1999 Russian legislative election in the Bratsk constituency
Candidate	Party	Votes	%
Vitaly Shuba (incumbent)	Fatherland – All Russia	86,587	36.14%
Yury Purdenko	Independent	75,300	31.43%
Tatyana Vinogradova	Independent	29,132	12.16%
Boris Khramovskikh	Independent	13,811	5.76%
against all		30,646	12.79%
Total		239,579	100%

=== 2003 ===
Summary of the 7 December 2003 Russian legislative election in the Bratsk constituency
Candidate	Party	Votes	%
Vitaly Shuba (incumbent)	United Russia	149,023	54.92%
Aleksandr Silchenko	Communist Party	47,468	17.49%
Aleksandr Vechirko	Independent	18,324	6.75%
Vadim Mikhaylov	Party of Russia's Rebirth-Russian Party of Life	9,745	3.59%
Vyacheslav Shapovalov	Independent	6,599	2.43%
against all		36,677	13.52%
Total		271,529	100%

=== 2016 ===
Summary of the 18 September 2016 Russian legislative election in the Bratsk constituency
Candidate	Party	Votes	%
Andrey Chernyshev	United Russia	61,409	41.43%
Andrey Andreyev	Communist Party	35,268	23.79%
Georgy Lubenkov	Liberal Democratic Party	21,949	14.81%
Nikolay Ochkas	Rodina	5,230	3.53%
Oleg Katasonov	Communists of Russia	4,294	2.90%
Denis Kuchmenko	Party of Growth	3,891	2.63%
Viktor Makarov	Patriots of Russia	3,774	2.55%
Dmitry Belikov	Civic Platform	3,279	2.21%
Total		148,221	100%

=== 2021 ===
Summary of the 17-19 September 2021 Russian legislative election in the Bratsk constituency
Candidate	Party	Votes	%
Alexander Yakubovsky	United Russia	45,515	31.29%
Andrey Andreyev	Communist Party	36,087	24.81%
Larisa Yegorova	A Just Russia — For Truth	13,033	8.96%
Oleg Popov	Liberal Democratic Party	10,629	7.31%
Alla Lagutina	New People	9,298	6.39%
Yevgeny Goloviznin	Party of Pensioners	6,988	4.80%
Sergey Nikonov	Russian Party of Freedom and Justice	3,611	2.48%
Tuyana Indrayeva	Rodina	3,011	2.07%
Oleg Yegupov	Green Alternative	2,684	1.85%
Olga Lomanova	The Greens	2,442	1.68%
Aleksey Tupitsin	Yabloko	2,077	1.43%
Artem Orlov	Party of Growth	1,748	1.20%
Total		145,439	100%

=== 2026 ===
Summary of the 18-20 September 2026 Russian legislative election in the Bratsk constituency
Candidate	Party	Votes	%
Oleg Novitsky	Communist Party	42,946	29.84%
Andrey Antonenkov	United Russia	31,794	22.09%
Igor Zuyev	A Just Russia	18,845	13.09%
Maksim Ignatov	Liberal Democratic Party	17,990	12.50%
Tatyana Bashkatova	New People	17,022	11.83%
Yelena Yakovleva	Rodina	7,987	5.55%
Total		143,927	100%
