= Kachug =

Kachug (Russian: Качуг) is the name of several inhabited localities in Russia.

Urban localities

- Kachug, Irkutsk Oblast, a work settlement in Kachugsky District of Irkutsk Oblast

Rural localities

- Kachug, Vologda Oblast, a village in Milofanovsky Selsoviet of Nikolsky District of Vologda Oblast
