= Balagansk =

Balagansk Балаганск
- Work settlement
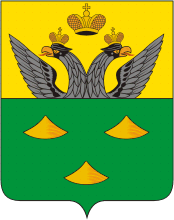
- Coat of arms
- Interactive map of Balagansk
- Location of Balagansk Balagansk (Irkutsk Oblast)
- Coordinates: 54°00′29″N 103°02′56″E
- Country: Russia
- Federal subject: Irkutsk Oblast
- Administrative district: Balagansky District
- Established at the old location: 1654
- Urban-type settlement status since: 1962
- Elevation: 433 m (1,421 ft)

Population (2010 Census)
  - Total: 4,109
  - Estimate (2025): 3,791 (−7.7%)

Administrative status
  - Capital of: Balagansky District

Municipal status
  - Municipal district: Balagansky Municipal District
  - Urban settlement: Balaganskoye Urban Settlement
  - Capital of: Balagansky Municipal District, Balaganskoye Urban Settlement
- Time zone: UTC+8 (MSK+5)
- Postal code: 666391
- OKTMO ID: 25601151051
- Website: balagansk.adminbalagansk.ru

Balagansk (Russian: Балага́нск) is an urban locality (a work settlement) and the administrative center of Balagansky District, Irkutsk Oblast, Russia. It is located on the left bank of the Angara River, downstream from Svirsk and 285 kilometres (177 mi) by road northwest of Irkutsk and to the southeast of Sayansk. Population: 4,109 (2010 census); 4,307 (2002 census); 4,136 (1989 Soviet census).

On three sides of Balagansk is the Bratsk Reservoir. The settlement is best known for Balagansk Prison, which was used as one of the Siberian exile camps during the Stalin era.

== History ==
Balagansk was founded in 1654 on the left bank of the Angara River opposite to the mouth of the Unga River by the Cossack detachment led by Dmitry Firsov in the course of Russian colonization of Siberia. Its name is derived from the word "Bulagat", literally meaning sable hunters, a Buryat tribe. From 1655, mass settlement started in the area; eventually, a colony was built and iron mining developed. In 1658, Ivan Pokhabov, the administrator (prikazchik) of Balagansk, caused an outbreak and many Russians were killed by them. Balagansk Fortress (ostrog) was built in Balagansk; the Buryats were attached to it and paid tributes to the Russians. Buryats grew to dominate the area and on April 1, 1818, seventeen clans of the Balagansk Buryats met and adopted a memorandum to submit to the Russian authorities. In their memorandum they raised six issues and also provided action to be taken on each of them which related to courts, private law, criminal law, the rights and duties of the chief Taisha and heads of clans.

In the course of the administrative reform carried out in 1708 by Peter the Great, the area was included in Siberia Governorate. In 1764, Irkutsk Governorate split off, and in 1775, Balagansk became a town and the seat of Balagansky Uyezd of Irkutsk Governorate. In 1924, the uyezds were abolished, the governorate was split into districts, and Balagansk became a part of Ziminsky District. In 1925, it lost town status and was downgraded to a selo. In 1926, Balagansky District was established, and Balagansk became the district center.

In the 19th and the 20th centuries, Balagansk, along with all Siberian towns, was widely used for political exile. Catherine Breshkovsky, known as the Little Grandmother of The Russian Revolution, was sent to Balagansk, a place of her choice on exile, as she expressed that her health would be better protected here. Joseph Stalin, when he tried to escape from exile in 1902, visited Balagansk. Balagansk Prison was used as one of the Siberian exile camps for dissidents, persecuted ethnic groups and criminals, and Stalin sent many Jews to the camp. It was one of the oldest buildings in the city but has long been in a dilapidated state.

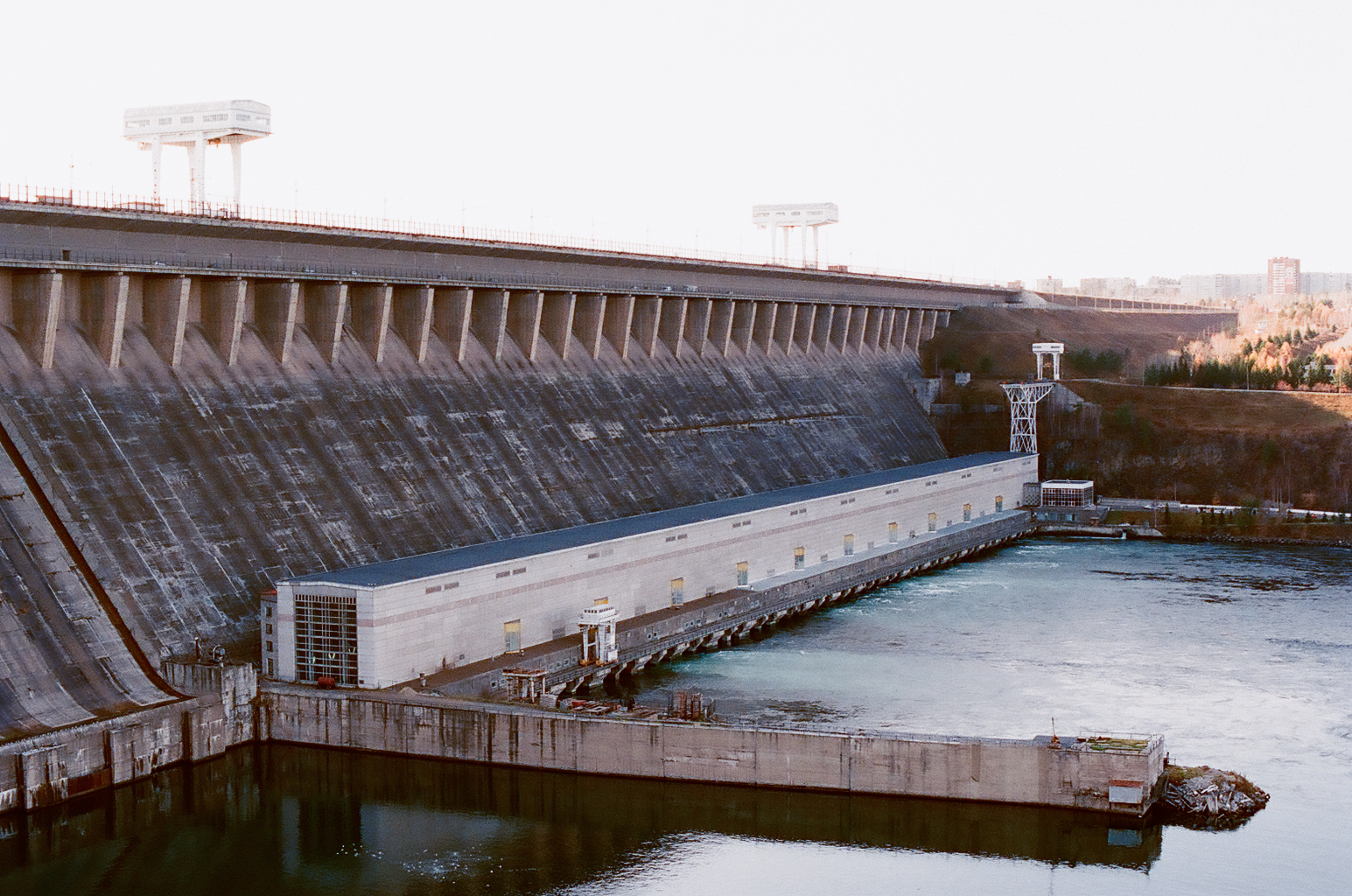
Bratsk dam and Hydroelectric Power Station which submerged the old town of Balagansk

During the construction of Bratsk Hydroelectric Power Station, Balagansk had to be evacuated as it was slated to be submerged under water. A new settlement, Novobalagansk (literally, New Balagansk), was founded in 1957 several dozens kilometers north of the original location of Balagansk to house the residents. The name passed to the new settlement, when it was renamed Balagansk and granted urban-type settlement status on June 5, 1962. In the same year, Balagansky District was abolished, and the settlement was transferred to Zalarinsky District, in 1965 to Ust-Udinsky District, and in 1989 Balagansky District was established, and Balagansk became the administrative center of the district.

== Geography ==
Balagansk is situated on the left bank of the Angara River at the average elevation of 427 metres (1,401 ft). A grotto is located near Balagansk. It is a natural cave or opening whose entrance is formed in a rock face that is 21 m (70 ft) in height with a width of about 55 m (180 ft). When viewed from a distance, it appears to be ruins. In the large opening there are three caverns which lead into three large galleries, each of which is about 320 m (1,050 ft) in length. These join at the end to form a larger cavern which extends further for some distance and terminates at a dead end of a huge mass of ice.

== Climate and vegetation ==
During the Pleistocene period, the climate changes that occurred were severe, which caused changes in distribution patterns of flora and fauna. These changes which occurred between glacial and interglacial periods have been explained under the refugia theory propounded in 1969 by Jürgen Haffer. Balagansk, which is part of the eastern forest-steppes of Tulun-Irkutsk- Balagansk, is reported to possess a different type of Arboreal vegetation. These are mainly pine and larch. The area which is forested constitutes a much greater area than cultivated lands.

Balagansk has a subarctic climate (Köppen climate classification Dfc). Winters are very cold and long while summers are warm and wet. Average monthly temperatures range from +18.7 °C (65.7 °F) in July to −23.9 °C (−11.0 °F) in January. Precipitation is moderate and is significantly higher in summer than at other times of the year.

Climate data for Balagansk (normals 1953–2011)
Month	Jan	Feb	Mar	Apr	May	Jun	Jul	Aug	Sep	Oct	Nov	Dec	Year
Record high °C (°F)	0.1 (32.2)	4.8 (40.6)	13.6 (56.5)	23.9 (75.0)	30.7 (87.3)	36.0 (96.8)	36.2 (97.2)	33.8 (92.8)	28.9 (84.0)	20.0 (68.0)	10.6 (51.1)	3.4 (38.1)	36.2 (97.2)
Mean daily maximum °C (°F)	−19.9 (−3.8)	−16.2 (2.8)	−5.4 (22.3)	6.9 (44.4)	16.4 (61.5)	23.1 (73.6)	25.2 (77.4)	22.1 (71.8)	14.9 (58.8)	5.9 (42.6)	−6.5 (20.3)	−16.3 (2.7)	4.3 (39.7)
Daily mean °C (°F)	−24.9 (−12.8)	−22.3 (−8.1)	−12.5 (9.5)	0.2 (32.4)	8.5 (47.3)	15.7 (60.3)	18.5 (65.3)	15.6 (60.1)	8.4 (47.1)	0.4 (32.7)	−11.1 (12.0)	−21.0 (−5.8)	−1.9 (28.6)
Mean daily minimum °C (°F)	−29.4 (−20.9)	−27.5 (−17.5)	−18.5 (−1.3)	−5.2 (22.6)	1.8 (35.2)	9.1 (48.4)	12.7 (54.9)	10.2 (50.4)	3.4 (38.1)	−3.9 (25.0)	−15.4 (4.3)	−25.5 (−13.9)	−7.2 (19.0)
Record low °C (°F)	−47 (−53)	−45.5 (−49.9)	−42.8 (−45.0)	−33.4 (−28.1)	−10.6 (12.9)	−3.9 (25.0)	0.0 (32.0)	0.0 (32.0)	−8.9 (16.0)	−24 (−11)	−36.1 (−33.0)	−48.9 (−56.0)	−48.9 (−56.0)
Average precipitation mm (inches)	27.0 (1.06)	28.4 (1.12)	32.6 (1.28)	22.6 (0.89)	37.8 (1.49)	45.4 (1.79)	72.7 (2.86)	62.2 (2.45)	38.5 (1.52)	21.3 (0.84)	17.4 (0.69)	23.0 (0.91)	428.9 (16.89)
Average precipitation days	16.3	11.9	8.9	8.6	9.6	10.8	9.0	10.9	11.9	12.8	17.1	19.0	146.8
Average relative humidity (%)	81.2	79.9	74.4	64.2	60.1	69.5	75.8	78.3	77.1	74.4	80.0	83.7	74.9
Mean monthly sunshine hours	102.3	134.4	220.1	255.0	272.8	273.0	251.1	241.8	189.0	136.4	93.0	74.4	2,243.3
Source: Climatebase.ru

== Economy ==
=== Industry ===
The economy of Balagansk is based on timber and food industries. 2 kilometres (1.2 mi) south of Balagansk, there is a quarry which supplies clay for brick production.

=== Transportation ===
The settlement is connected by road with Zalari, where it has access to the M53 highway, connecting Novosibirsk with Irkutsk. The closest accessible railway station is also in Zalari, which lies on the Trans-Siberian Railway. The Angara is navigable.

== Culture ==
The tomb of Władysław Anielewski, a Polish social-democrat who died in 1898, at the old cemetery in Balagansk is protected as a cultural monument of federal significance.
