= Kuytun, Russia =

Kuytun (Russian: Куйтун) is the name of several inhabited localities in Russia.

Urban localities

- Kuytun, Kuytunsky District, Irkutsk Oblast, a work settlement in Kuytunsky District, Irkutsk Oblast

Rural localities

- Kuytun, Republic of Buryatia, a selo in Kuytunsky Selsoviet of Tarbagataysky District of the Republic of Buryatia
- Kuytun, Shelekhovsky District, Irkutsk Oblast, a settlement in Shelekhovsky District, Irkutsk Oblast
- Kuytun, Zabaykalsky Krai, a settlement in Krasnokamensky District of Zabaykalsky Krai
