= Nizhny Sayantuy =

Nizhny Sayantuy Нижний Саянтуй
- Selo
- Location within Republic of Buryatia Location within Russia
- Coordinates: 51°44′N 107°31′E
- Country: Russia
- Region: Republic of Buryatia
- District: Tarbagataysky District
- Time zone: UTC+8:00

Nizhny Sayantuy (Russian: Нижний Саянтуй; Buryat: Доодо Саянта, Doodo Saianta) is a rural locality (a selo) in Tarbagataysky District, Republic of Buryatia, Russia. The population was 2,829 as of 2010. There are 97 streets.

== Geography ==
Nizhny Sayantuy is located 36 km north of Tarbagatay (the district's administrative centre) by road. Voznesenovka is the nearest rural locality.
