= Novaya Uda =

Novaya Uda (Russian: Новая Уда) is the name of several rural localities in Russia:

- Novaya Uda, Irkutsk Oblast, a selo in Ust-Udinsky District of Irkutsk Oblast
- Novaya Uda, Republic of Mordovia, a selo in Atemarsky Selsoviet of Lyambirsky District of the Republic of Mordovia
