= Pesterovo =

Pesterovo Пестерево
- Selo
- Location within Republic of Buryatia Location within Russia
- Coordinates: 51°30′N 107°27′E
- Country: Russia
- Region: Republic of Buryatia
- District: Tarbagataysky District
- Time zone: UTC+8:00

Pesterovo (Russian: Пестерево) is a rural locality (a selo) in Tarbagataysky District, Republic of Buryatia, Russia. The population was 448 as of 2010. There are 3 streets.

== Geography ==
Pesterovo is located 9 km east of Tarbagatay (the district's administrative centre) by road. Tarbagatay is the nearest rural locality.
