= Verkhny Zhirim =

Russian rural locality in Buryatia, 964 population

Verkhny Zhirim Верхний Жирим
- Selo
- Location within Republic of Buryatia Location within Russia
- Coordinates: 51°19′N 107°13′E
- Country: Russia
- Region: Republic of Buryatia
- District: Tarbagataysky District
- Time zone: UTC+8:00

Verkhny Zhirim (Russian: Верхний Жирим) is a rural locality (a selo) in Tarbagataysky District, Republic of Buryatia, Russia. The population was 964 as of 2010. There are 8 streets.

== Geography ==
Verkhny Zhirim is located 27 km southwest of Tarbagatay (the district's administrative centre) by road. Barykino is the nearest rural locality.
