= Sayantuy =

Sayantuy Саянтуй
- Settlement
- Location within Republic of Buryatia Location within Russia
- Coordinates: 51°41′N 107°26′E
- Country: Russia
- Region: Republic of Buryatia
- District: Tarbagataysky District
- Time zone: UTC+8:00

Sayantuy (Russian: Саянтуй; Buryat: Саянта, Saianta) is a rural locality (a settlement) in Tarbagataysky District, Republic of Buryatia, Russia. The population was 138 as of 2010. There are 9 streets.

== Geography ==
Sayantuy is located 29 km north of Tarbagatay (the district's administrative centre) by road. Voznesenovka is the nearest rural locality.
