= Solontsy, Republic of Buryatia =

Solontsy Солонцы
- Selo
- Location within Republic of Buryatia Location within Russia
- Coordinates: 51°36′N 107°23′E
- Country: Russia
- Region: Republic of Buryatia
- District: Tarbagataysky District
- Time zone: UTC+8:00

Solontsy (Russian: Солонцы) is a rural locality (a selo) in Tarbagataysky District, Republic of Buryatia, Russia. The population was 642 as of 2010. There are 10 streets in the locality.

== Geography ==
Solontsy is located 17 km north of Tarbagatay (the district's administrative centre) by road. Selenga is the nearest rural locality.
