= Burnashevo =

Burnashevo Бурнашево
- Selo
- Location within Republic of Buryatia Location within Russia
- Coordinates: 51°25′N 107°23′E
- Country: Russia
- Region: Republic of Buryatia
- District: Tarbagataysky District
- Time zone: UTC+8:00

Burnashevo (Russian: Бурнашево) is a rural locality (a selo) in Tarbagataysky District, Republic of Buryatia, Russia. The population was 245 as of 2010. There are 3 streets.

== Geography ==
Burnashevo is located 9 km south of Tarbagatay (the district's administrative centre) by road. Desyatnikovo is the nearest rural locality.
