= Barykino-Klyuchi =

Barykino-Klyuchi Барыкино-Ключи
- Selo
- Location within Republic of Buryatia Location within Russia
- Coordinates: 51°15′N 107°16′E
- Country: Russia
- Region: Republic of Buryatia
- District: Tarbagataysky District
- Time zone: UTC+8:00

Barykino-Klyuchi (Russian: Барыкино-Ключи) is a rural locality (a selo) in Tarbagataysky District, Republic of Buryatia, Russia. The population was 162 as of 2010. There are 2 streets.

== Geography ==
Barykino-Klyuchi is located 35 km southwest of Tarbagatay (the district's administrative centre) by road. Khandagatay is the nearest rural locality.
