= Saratovka, Republic of Buryatia =

Saratovka Саратовка
- Selo
- Location within Republic of Buryatia Location within Russia
- Coordinates: 51°39′N 107°25′E
- Country: Russia
- Region: Republic of Buryatia
- District: Tarbagataysky District
- Time zone: UTC+8:00

Saratovka (Russian: Саратовка) is a rural locality (a selo) in Tarbagataysky District, Republic of Buryatia, Russia. The population was 210 as of 2010. There is 1 street.

== Geography ==
Saratovka is located 22 km north of Tarbagatay (the district's administrative centre) by road. Selenga is the nearest rural locality.
