= Chunsky =

Chunsky (masculine), Chunskaya (feminine), or Chunskoye (neuter) may refer to:

- Chunsky District, a district of Irkutsk Oblast, Russia
- Chunsky (urban-type settlement), an urban-type settlement in Irkutsk Oblast, Russia
