= Verkhny Sayantuy =

Verkhny Sayantuy Верхний Саянтуй
- Selo
- Location within Republic of Buryatia Location within Russia
- Coordinates: 51°38′N 107°32′E
- Country: Russia
- Region: Republic of Buryatia
- District: Tarbagataysky District
- Time zone: UTC+8:00

Verkhny Sayantuy (Russian: Верхний Саянтуй; Buryat: Дээдэ Саянта, Deede Saianta) is a rural locality (a selo) in Tarbagataysky District, Republic of Buryatia, Russia. The population was 308 as of 2010. There are 6 streets.

== Geography ==
Verkhny Sayantuy is located 40 km north of Tarbagatay (the district's administrative centre) by road. Voznesenovka is the nearest rural locality.
