= Tarnopol (Irkutsk region) =

Coordinates: 54°02′50″N 102°46′04″E

Tarnopol is a village in the Balagansky District of Irkutsk Oblast, Russia. It serves as the administrative center of the Tarnopol rural settlement.

== History ==
The village of Tarnopol was founded in 1927–1928 by settlers from Belarus. In 1939, mass collectivization began in the Balagansky District, and the Pobeda collective farm was established, with its administrative center located in Tarnopol under the village council.

During the 1950s, agricultural reorganization led to the formation of the Rossiya collective farm within the village. In 1962, following the completion of the Bratsk Hydroelectric Power Station and the flooding associated with the creation of the Bratsk Reservoir, residents from submerged settlements were resettled in Tarnopol, contributing to the village's population growth.

== Geography ==
Tarnopol is located on the left bank of the Odisa River, approximately 17 km west-northwest (WNW) of the district administrative center, the village of Balagansk. The village lies at an elevation of 426 meters above sea level.

The total area of Tarnopol is 218 hectares, of which 140.7 hectares are occupied by built-up residential and infrastructural development.

== Infrastructure ==
The village has a comprehensive (general education) school, a village cultural club, a library, a first-aid post, a post office, and four retail stores. Agricultural activity is centered around the SPK "Tarnopolsky" (an agricultural production cooperative).

The total residential floor area of the village amounts to 10,700 square meters.
