= Alexander Astashev =

Russian serial killer and robber

- Born: Alexander Nikolayevich Astashev; November 17, 1956 (age 69); Cheremkhovo, Irkutsk Oblast, RSFSR
- Other names: "The Cheremkhovo Poisoner" "The Killer in a White Coat" "The Black Doctor"
- Conviction: N/A
- Penalty: Involuntary commitment

Details
- Victims: 17
- Span of crimes: 2003–2005
- Country: Russia
- States: Irkutsk, Zabaykalsky, Perm, Kirov, Udmurtia
- Date apprehended: September 2005

Alexander Nikolayevich Astashev (Russian: Александр Николаевич Асташев; born November 17, 1956), known as the Cheremkhovo Poisoner (Russian: Черемховский отравитель, romanized: Cheremkhovskiy otravitel), is a Russian serial killer and robber who, together with his wife and another female accomplice, poisoned 31 people across various oblasts from 2003 to 2005. Of these, 17 proved fatal.

All three would later be arrested, with Astashev being ruled incompetent to stand trial while his accomplices were imprisoned.

== Early life ==
Alexander Astashev was born on November 17, 1956, in the town of Cheremkhovo, Irkutsk Oblast. Little is known about his childhood and adolescent years.

During the Soviet and post-Soviet years, Astashev was incarcerated multiple times for a variety of offenses, beginning when he was a child in 1972. In 1982, he was caught abusing a child and later attempted to escape while being transported to prison, for which he was sentenced to 15 years imprisonment. After serving it out in full, he returned to Cheremkhovo in 1997. Not long after, he was arrested for an incident in which one person was stabbed to death and another severely wounded; however, it was ruled to be a case of excessive self-defense, and Astashev received only a minor prison sentence.

In that same year, he married a local resident, Natalia, who was 20 years younger than him and worked as the head teacher at a kindergarten. A daughter was born out of this marriage, and Astashev had to resort to working odd jobs to earn money. During later interviews with police, he complained about how hard life is in a mining town, leading to suspicions that he began his criminal activities for monetary gain.

== Murders ==
=== Modus operandi ===
Astashev teamed up with his wife and 19-year-old mistress Anastasia Musikhina, who aided him in most of the crimes. Traveling around Irkutsk Oblast and later on in other regions, Astashev sought out elderly people on the streets and presented himself as a doctor; to make himself more believable, he always wore a medical coat, a tonometer, and a phonendoscope. During the conversation, he would ask them about their health and offer to treat them for free at home; if the victim accepted, Astashev and his accomplices would go to the house, where he would perform superficial medical procedures to put the victim at ease. Once trust was earned, he would give his victims a handful of potent sleeping pills (aminazine, suprastin and barbiturates) and a low-alcohol fruit-flavored drink kept in a balm bottle, which he presented as a "syrup." Soon after taking this mixture, the victim would either fall asleep or die, whereupon Astashev and his accomplices would ransack the apartment, stealing various appliances, precious jewelry, money, and, in some cases, even food and drinks from the refrigerator.

Astashev committed his first crime on October 13, 2003, in the village of Zalari, Irkutsk Oblast. The victims were an elderly couple, with the husband succumbing to acute poisoning on the way to the hospital while his wife managed to survive. Everything of value was stolen from their house.

In the spring of 2004, Astashev committed his first crime with the aid of his wife, who presented herself as a "nurse." Clad in a medical coat, he went to the village of Nizhnyaya Iret and tricked a local couple into drinking his concoction, which knocked them out. While the couple were unconscious, the Astashevs stole a variety of items totaling 17.5 thousand rubles and fled in a Lada Niva. Five days later, one of the victims, a 67-year-old, died from complications relating to this incident.

In the summer of 2004, Astashev drugged and robbed a resident of Krasnoyarsk Krai at the Tayshet railway station, but the woman managed to survive and informed the police about the incident. After giving a detailed description of the supposed "doctor," authorities quickly identified him as Alexander Astashev, and he was thereafter put on the federal wanted list.

Astashev's most prolific period lasted from June 2004 to August 2005. Having committed five fatal poisonings in the Irkutsk Oblast, he and his accomplices soon switched to traveling to other regions to avoid being caught by police. In Perm, while waiting at a train station, he met a man with a number of illnesses who accepted his treatment proposal, after which Astashev took him to a secluded area and gave him nine pills and some beer. This victim survived the ordeal. In the town of Zuyevka, Kirov Oblast, Astashev and Musikhina, wearing medical robes, gave a medicinal mixture to a local pensioner, claiming that they were employees of the Kirov Hospital and that they were bringing free pills from the Central Pharmacy. On August 31, 2005, a WWII veteran was fatally poisoned in Kirov, in what proved to be Astashev's last murder. Other such attacks were recorded in the Chita Oblast (now Zabaykalsky Krai), the Ust-Orda Buryat Okrug (now part of Irkutsk Oblast), and several cities in Udmurtia.

A special investigative division was not formed for a long time due to the fact that Astashev and his accomplices were constantly moving around, which was initially considered unrelated to one another. In addition, the deaths of pensioners were often written off as coronary heart disease, and thus criminal cases were never initiated.

== Arrest, investigation and trial ==
In September 2005, Astashev and his accomplices were finally apprehended in Glazov, Udmurtia. During subsequent investigations into his activities as a fugitive, authorities discovered that he was responsible for 31 robberies committed across multiple regions, with 17 of them proving fatal.

The investigation into the extent of the crimes lasted for two years, and during that time, investigators started to suspect that Astashev suffered from mental abnormalities but was initially ruled sane when checked in at a local psychiatric hospital. Later on, by request of his lawyer, he was transferred to the Serbsky Center, where a forensic psychiatric exam ruled him to be suffering from a particularly severe form of paranoid schizophrenia.

On August 6, 2008, the Irkutsk Regional Court ordered that Astashev undergo compulsory medical treatment in a specialized psychiatric institution with intensive supervision, as he posed a significant danger to society due to his delusions, impulsiveness, and destructive behavior, as well as the severity of his crimes. His wife Natalia was sentenced to 7.5 years imprisonment with five years of probation, while Musikhina was given six years imprisonment with five years' probation.

== See also ==
- List of Russian serial killers
