= Kuytun (disambiguation) =

Kuytun （also transcribed Kuitun) is a county-level city of the Ili Kazakh Autonomous Prefecture, Xinjiang, China.

Kuytun or Kuitun may also refer to:

- Kuytun, Russia, name of several inhabited localities in Russia
- Mt Kuitun (Kuitunshan, 奎屯山), the western tripoint of the borders of Russia, China, and Mongolia (see Mongolia–Russia_border#Tripoints)
