= Tarnopol (disambiguation) =

Tarnopol is the Polish name for Ternopil, Ukraine; a city formerly in the Austro-Hungarian Empire.

Tarnopol may also refer to:

== Places ==
- Tarnopol, Saskatchewan, an unincorporated community in Saskatchewan, Canada
- Tarnopol, Irkutsk Region, a village in Russia named by Belarusian settlers
- Tarnopol Ghetto, a German-Nazi ghetto
- Tarnopol Voivodeship, an administrative region of interwar Poland (1918–1939)

== Other uses ==
- Battle of Tarnopol, a battle in 1919, part of the Polish–Ukrainian War
- Nat Tarnopol, an American record producer
