= Kuytun, Republic of Buryatia =

Kuytun Куйтун
- Selo
- Location within Republic of Buryatia Location within Russia
- Coordinates: 51°31′N 107°45′E
- Country: Russia
- Region: Republic of Buryatia
- District: Tarbagataysky District
- Time zone: UTC+8:00

Kuytun (Russian: Куйтун; Buryat: Хγйтэн, Khüiten) is a rural locality (a selo) in Tarbagataysky District, Republic of Buryatia, Russia. The population was 767 as of 2010. There are 12 streets.

== Geography ==
Kuytun is located 32 km east of Tarbagatay (the district's administrative centre) by road. Nadeyino is the nearest rural locality.
