= Sergey Ten =

Russian politician

- Сергей Тен
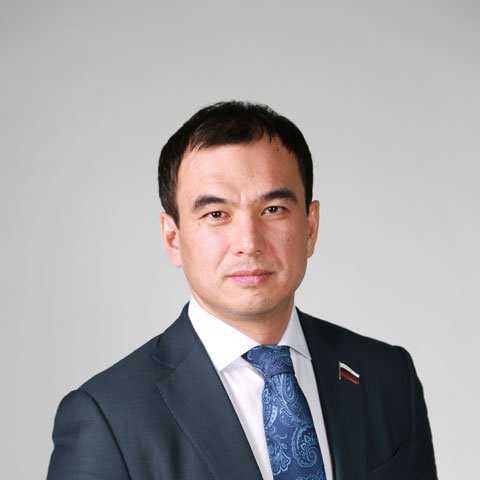

Member of the State Duma for Irkutsk Oblast
- Incumbent
- Assumed office 5 October 2016
- Preceded by: constituency re-established
- Constituency: Shelekhov (No. 95)

Member of the State Duma (Party List Seat)
- In office 21 December 2011 – 5 October 2016

Personal details
- Born: 25 August 1976 (age 50) Irkutsk, Russian SFSR, USSR
- Party: United Russia
- Spouse: Eleonora Vladimirovna
- Children: 3
- Education: Kutafin Moscow State Law University; RANEPA (MBA)

Sergey Ten (Russian: Сергей Тен) is a Russian politician and public figure, member of the State Duma of the Federal Assembly of the Russian Federation.

== Early life and education ==
Ten graduated from the Moscow State Law Academy (MSLA).

In 2006, he completed an MBA program at the Academy of National Economy under the Government of the Russian Federation, specializing in Human Resource Management.

== Career ==
From 2000 to 2011, Ten headed a major Russian road construction company.

=== Regional politics ===
In 2010–2011, he was elected deputy of the Legislative Assembly of the Irkutsk Region, where he served on the Committee on Property and Economic Policy.

=== State Duma ===
From 2011 to 2016, Ten served as a deputy of the State Duma of the 6th convocation, holding the position of Deputy Chairman of the Committee on Transport.

From 2016 to 2021, he was elected to the State Duma of the 7th convocation from the Shelekhov single-mandate constituency No. 95. He worked in the Committee on Transport and Construction and, since June 2017, chaired the State Duma’s Inter-factional Working Group Baikal.

In September 2021, Ten was elected deputy of the State Duma of the 8th convocation from the Shelekhov single-mandate constituency No. 95. He became First Deputy Chairman of the Committee on Property, Land and Property Relations.

=== Legislative activity ===
Between 2011 and 2019, during his service in the 6th and 7th convocations of the State Duma, Ten co-authored 51 legislative initiatives and amendments to federal draft laws.

== Political activity ==
Ten joined the United Russia party in 2003.

From 2006 to 2009, he served as Chief of Staff of the Irkutsk regional branch of the Young Guard of United Russia.

In 2012, he became Secretary of the Regional Political Council of the Irkutsk regional branch of United Russia. From 2011 to 2016, he was a member of the General Council of the party. From 2012 to 2015, he headed the Interregional Coordinating Council for the Siberian Federal District..

== Public activity ==
Ten is a member of the Board of the Irkutsk Regional Association Baikal.

He has been actively engaged in charitable activities and was awarded the medal For Mercy and Charity by decision of the Public Chamber of the Irkutsk Region.

== Awards and recognition ==
Ten has received commendations from the President of the Russian Federation and the Government of the Russian Federation, as well as honorary diplomas from the State Duma of the Federal Assembly and the Ministry of Transport of the Russian Federation.

He was awarded the badge of honor Distinguished Road Builder of Russia, 1st class, and the medal of the Security Council of the Russian Federation For Merit in Strengthening International Security.

== Personal life ==
Sergey Ten is married and has two sons and a daughter.

== Sanctions ==
He was sanctioned by Canada under the Special Economic Measures Act (S.C. 1992, c. 17) in relation to the Russian invasion of Ukraine for Grave Breach of International Peace and Security, and by the UK government in 2022 in relation to Russo-Ukrainian War.
