= Ust-Uda =

Ust-Uda Усть-Уда
- Urban-type settlement
- Interactive map of Ust-Uda
- Location of Ust-Uda Ust-Uda (Irkutsk Oblast)
- Coordinates: 54.1745°N 103.0286°E
- Country: Russia
- Federal subject: Irkutsk Oblast
- Administrative district: Ust-Udinsky District
- Founded: 1962
- Elevation: 420 m (1,380 ft)

Population (2010 Census)
  - Total: 5,173
  - Estimate (2025): 4,815 (−6.9%)
- Time zone: UTC+8 (MSK+5)
- Postal code: 666352
- OKTMO ID: 25646151051

Ust-Uda (Russian: Усть-Уда) is an urban locality (an urban-type settlement) in Ust-Udinsky District of Irkutsk Oblast, Russia. Population: 5,173 (2010 census); 5,307 (2002 census); 5,190 (1989 Soviet census).
