= Novaya Uda, Irkutsk Oblast =

Novaya Uda Новая Уда
- Selo
- Interactive map of Novaya Uda
- Location of Novaya Uda Novaya Uda (Irkutsk Oblast)
- Coordinates: 54°01′N 103°37′E
- Country: Russia
- Federal subject: Irkutsk Oblast
- Administrative district: Ust-Udinsky District

Population
  - Estimate (2012): 1,022 )

Municipal status
  - Municipal district: Ust-Udinsky Municipal District
  - Rural settlement: Novoudinskoye Rural Settlement
- Time zone: UTC+8 (MSK+5)
- Postal code: 666361
- OKTMO ID: 25646428101

Novaya Uda (Russian: Новая Уда) is a rural locality (a selo) in Ust-Udinsky District of Irkutsk Oblast, Russia.

Joseph Stalin was exiled here on December 9, 1903.
