= Andrey Anatoliyevich Andreyev =

Russian politician

Andrey Andreyev
- Андрей Андреев

Member of the State Duma
- In office 2007–2016

Personal details
- Born: Andrey Anatoliyevich Andreyev; 24 May 1976 (age 49) Tomsk, Soviet Union

Andrey Anatoliyevich Andreyev (Russian: Андрей Анатольевич Андреев), born 24 May 1976 in Tomsk, Soviet Union, is a Russian politician.

== Biography ==
He was born on May 24, 1976, in Tomsk. In 1979–1993 he lived in Glazov (Udmurtia). In 1999 he graduated from the Faculty of Journalism of Moscow State University.

In 1997–2006 he headed the press service of the Communist Party of the Russian Federation and was the press secretary of the leader of the Communist Party of the Russian Federation, G.A. Zyuganov. In 2003 he was appointed as deputy general director of the newspaper Pravda.

In 2007 he was elected to the State Duma of the fifth convocation. He joined the Communist Party faction, was the member of the State Duma Committee on Information Policy, Information Technology and Communications.

In 2011, he was elected to the State Duma of the sixth convocation, and became the member of the Communist Party faction, the member of the State Duma Committee on Transport, and the deputy chairperson of the State Duma Committee on MPs’ ethics.

In the elections to the State Duma of the VIIth convocation (2016), he runs from the Communist Party in 96 Bratsk single-mandate electoral district, Irkutsk region, and is also included in the federal list from the Communist Party of the Russian Federation (regional group 21, Irkutsk region).

Candidate of Sciences. Associate Professor of Moscow State University.
