= Anatoliy Turusin =

Russian politician (1939–2022)

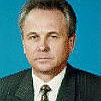

Member of the State Duma
- In office 11 January 1994 – 24 December 1999

Member of the Congress of People's Deputies of Russia
- In office 16 May 1990 – 4 October 1993

Personal details
- Born: Anatoliy Afanasyevich Turusin; 8 May 1939 Nizhneudinsk, Irkutsk Oblast, Russian SFSR, Soviet Union
- Died: 21 February 2022 (aged 82) Irkutsk, Russia
- Party: CPSU; APR
- Education: Irkutsk Agricultural Institute

Anatoliy Afanasyevich Turusin (Russian: Анатолий Афанасьевич Турусин; 8 May 1939 – 21 February 2022) was a Russian politician. A member of the Communist Party of the Soviet Union and later the Agrarian Party of Russia, he served in the Congress of People's Deputies of Russia from 1990 to 1993 and the State Duma from 1994 to 1999. He died in Irkutsk on 21 February 2022, at the age of 82.
