= Kachug, Vologda Oblast =

Kachug Качуг
- Village
- Location within Vologda Oblast Location within Russia
- Coordinates: 60°00′N 44°52′E
- Country: Russia
- Region: Vologda Oblast
- District: Nikolsky District
- Time zone: UTC+3:00

Kachug (Russian: Качуг) is a rural locality (a village) in Zelentsovskoye Rural Settlement, Nikolsky District, Vologda Oblast, Russia. The population was 31 as of 2002.

== Geography ==
Kachug is located 74 km northwest of Nikolsk (the district's administrative centre) by road. Vinograd is the nearest rural locality.
