= Chunsky (urban-type settlement) =

Chunsky Чунский
- Urban-type settlement
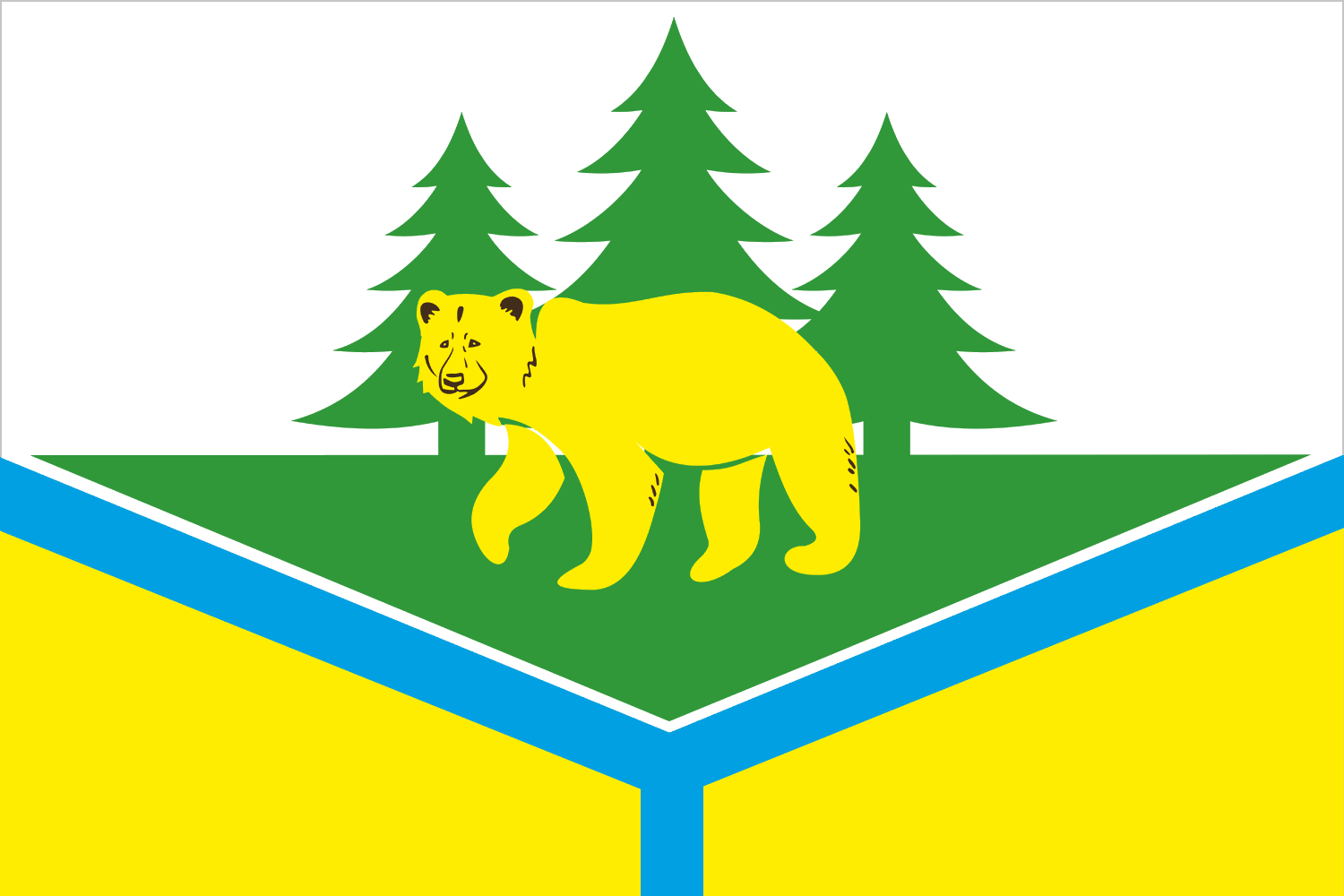
- Flag
- Interactive map of Chunsky
- Location of Chunsky Chunsky (Irkutsk Oblast)
- Coordinates: 56.0920°N 99.6378°E
- Country: Russia
- Federal subject: Irkutsk Oblast
- Administrative district: Chunsky District
- Founded: 1947

Population (2010 Census)
  - Total: 14,996
  - Estimate (2025): 13,032 (−13.1%)
- Time zone: UTC+8 (MSK+5)
- Postal code: 665510
- OKTMO ID: 25650151051

Chunsky (Russian: Чунский) is an urban locality (an urban-type settlement) in Chunsky District of Irkutsk Oblast, Russia. Population: 14,996 (2010 census); 16,630 (2002 census); 17,747 (1989 Soviet census).
