= Kuytun, Kuytunsky District, Irkutsk Oblast =

Kuytun Куйтун
- Urban-type settlement
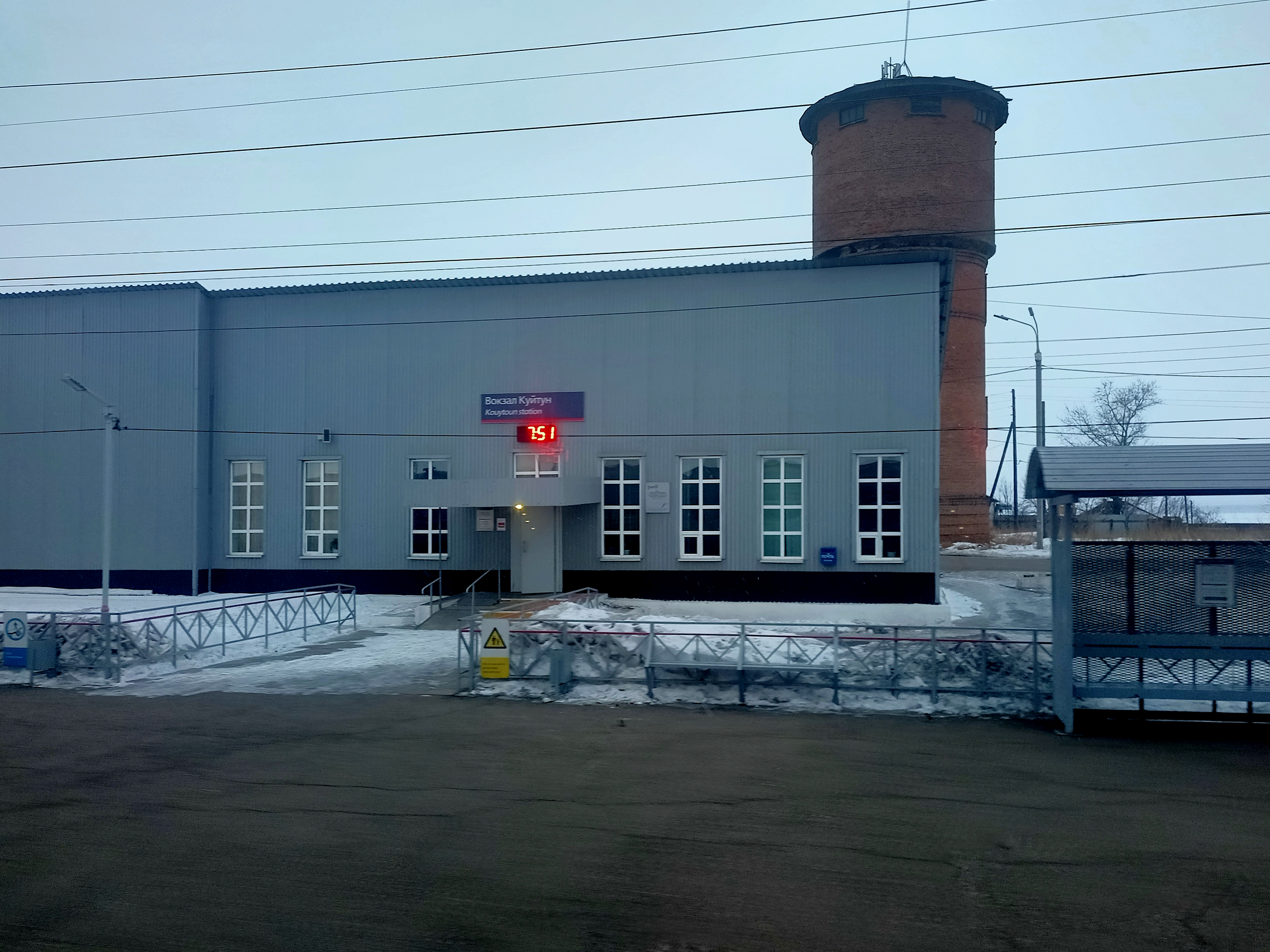

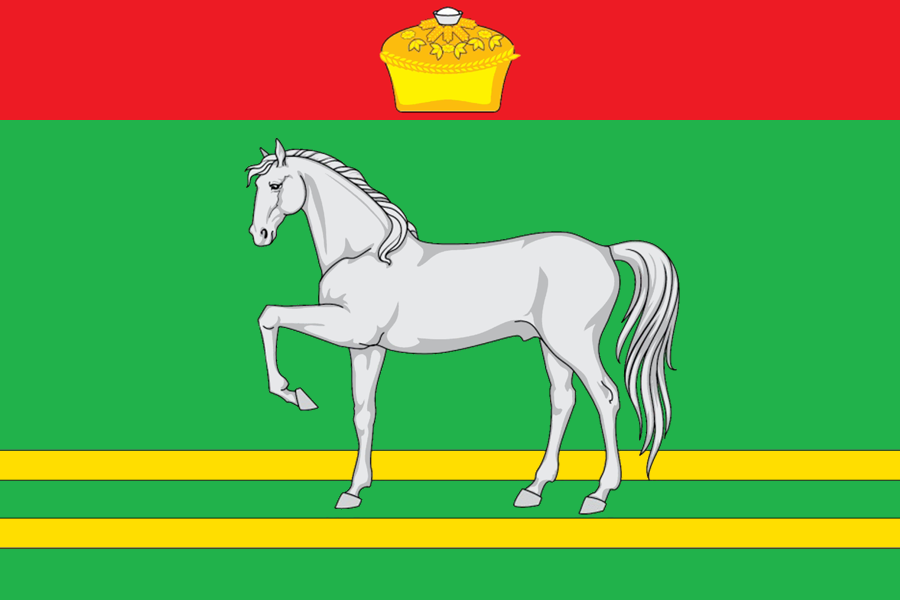
- Flag
- Interactive map of Kuytun
- Location of Kuytun Kuytun (Irkutsk Oblast)
- Coordinates: 54.3433°N 101.5073°E
- Country: Russia
- Federal subject: Irkutsk Oblast
- Administrative district: Kuytunsky District
- Founded: 1680
- Elevation: 607 m (1,991 ft)

Population (2010 Census)
  - Total: 10,097
  - Estimate (2025): 9,743 (−3.5%)
- Time zone: UTC+8 (MSK+5)
- Postal codes: 665301, 665302
- OKTMO ID: 25622151051

Kuytun (Russian: Куйтун; Buryat: Хүйтэн, Khüiten) is an urban locality (an urban-type settlement) in Kuytunsky District of Irkutsk Oblast, Russia. Population: 10,097 (2010 census); 10,847 (2002 census); 11,137 (1989 Soviet census).
