= Kachug, Irkutsk Oblast =

Kachug Качуг
- Urban-type settlement
- Interactive map of Kachug
- Location of Kachug Kachug (Irkutsk Oblast)
- Coordinates: 53.9607°N 105.8849°E
- Country: Russia
- Federal subject: Irkutsk Oblast
- Administrative district: Kachugsky District
- Founded: 1686
- Elevation: 533 m (1,749 ft)

Population (2010 Census)
  - Total: 7,011
  - Estimate (2025): 6,273 (−10.5%)
- Time zone: UTC+8 (MSK+5)
- Postal code: 666202
- OKTMO ID: 25618151051

Kachug (Russian: Качуг) is an urban locality (an urban-type settlement) in Kachugsky District of Irkutsk Oblast, Russia. Population: 7,011 (2010 census); 7,733 (2002 census); 8,936 (1989 Soviet census).

== Geography ==
The settlement is located in the Lena-Angara Plateau.
