= Alexander Yakubovsky =

Russian politician

- Александр Якубовский
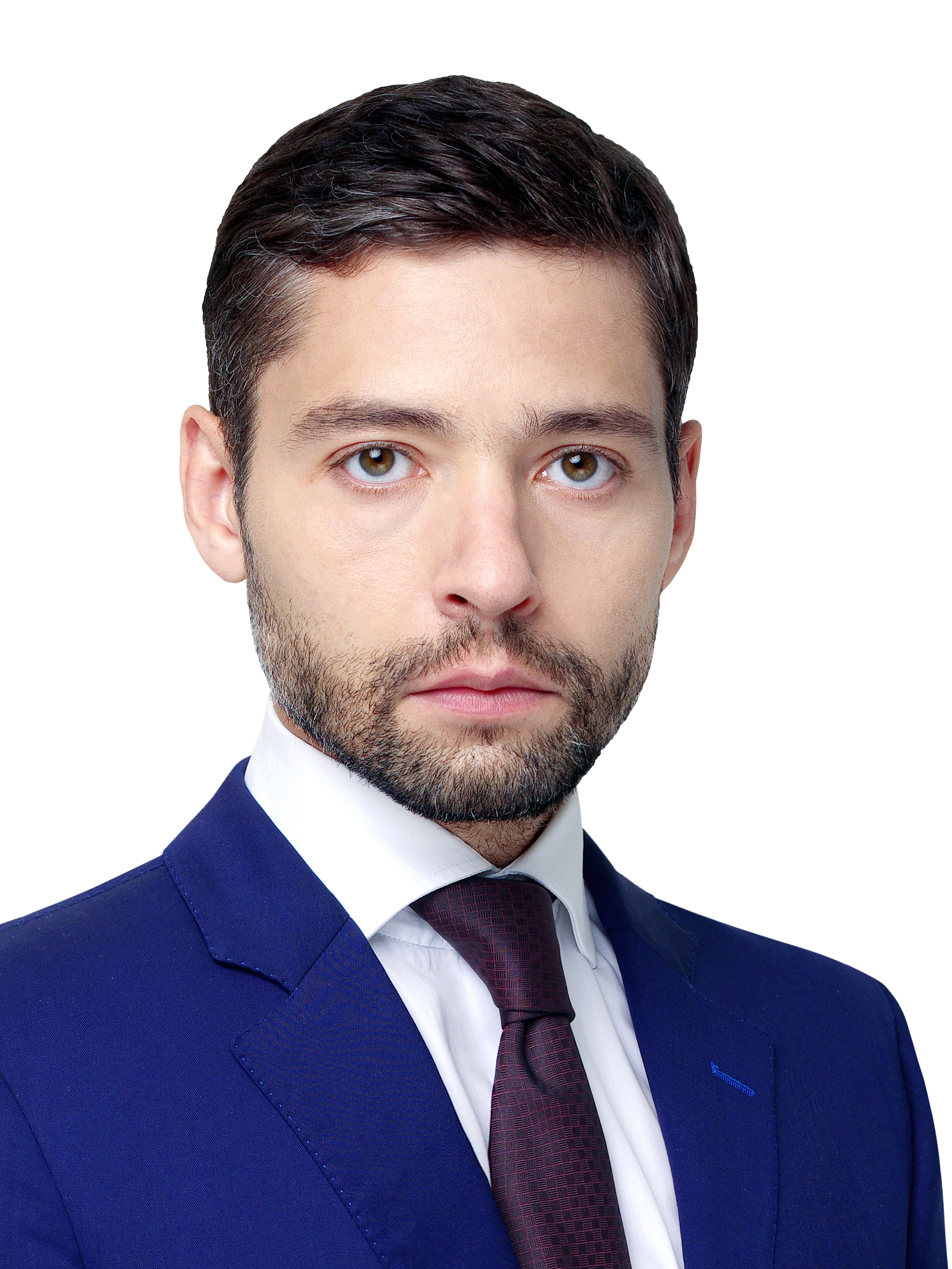

Member of the State Duma for Irkutsk Oblast
- Incumbent
- Assumed office 12 October 2021
- Preceded by: Andrey Chernyshev
- Constituency: Bratsk (No. 96)

Member of the State Duma (Party List Seat)
- In office 25 September 2018 – 12 October 2021
- Preceded by: Joseph Kobzon

Personal details
- Born: 7 May 1985 (age 41) Irkutsk, Russian SFSR, USSR
- Party: United Russia
- Spouse: Olga Yakubovskaya
- Children: 1 (daughter)
- Parents: Vladimir Viktorovich Yakubovsky (father); Larisa Aronovna Yakubovskaya (mother)
- Education: Baykalsky State University of Economics and Law; RANEPA (MPA)

Alexander Vladimirovich Yakubovsky (Russian: Александр Владимирович Якубовский; born 7 May 1985, Irkutsk) is a Russian political figure and a deputy of the 7th and 8th State Dumas.

From 2009 to 2011, Yakubovsky worked as Deputy General Director for Prospective Development of the Irkutskpromstroy. In 2009 he was appointed Managing Director of LLC "MonolithHolding" in Krasnoyarsk. From 2015 to 2018, he was the Commercial Director of the Baykalo-Amurskaya stroitel'naya kompaniya LLC. He started his political career in 2007 when he joined the United Russia. In 2008–2011, he was the Deputy Chief of the Regional Headquarters of the Young Guard of United Russia. From 2014 to 2018, he served as deputy of the Irkutsk City Duma of the 6th convocation. In 2016, he became a member of the regional branch of the All-Russia People's Front. On 9 September 2018 he was elected deputy of the Legislative Assembly of Irkutsk Oblast of the 3rd convocation. He left the post to become deputy of the 7th State Duma after the death of Joseph Kobzon. Since September 2021, he has served as deputy of the 8th State Duma.

== Sanctions ==
He was sanctioned by the UK government on 11 March 2022 in relation to the Russo-Ukrainian War.
