= Zalari =

Zalari Залари
- Urban-type settlement
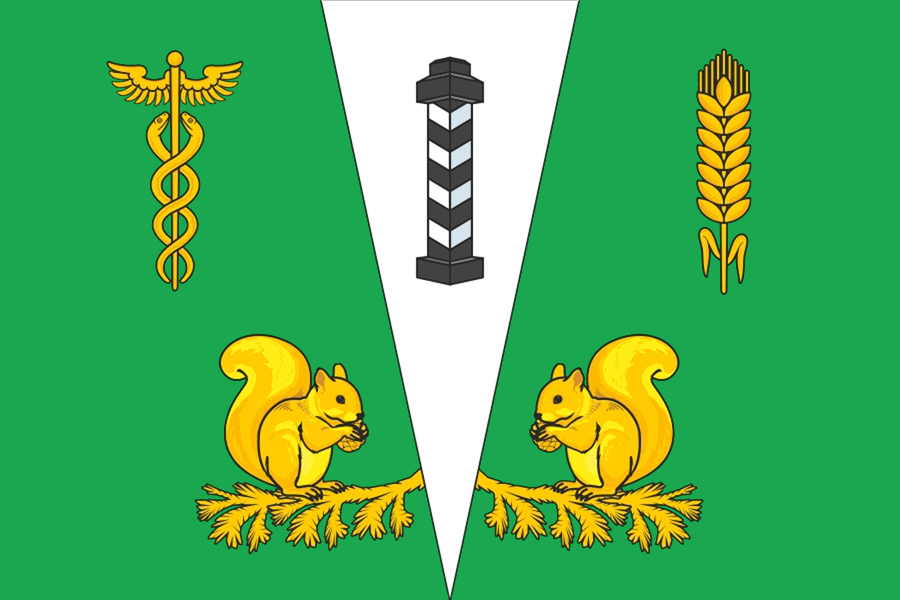
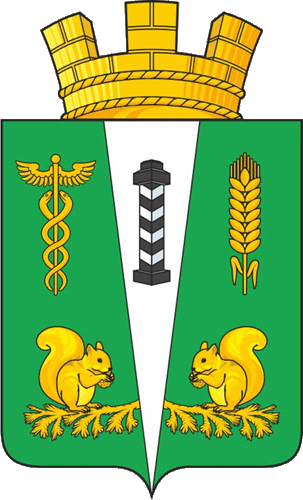
- Flag Coat of arms
- Interactive map of Zalari
- Location of Zalari Zalari (Irkutsk Oblast)
- Coordinates: 53.5660°N 102.5165°E
- Country: Russia
- Federal subject: Irkutsk Oblast
- Administrative district: Zalarinsky District
- Founded: 1704

Population (2010 Census)
  - Total: 9,600
  - Estimate (2025): 9,954 (+3.7%)
- Time zone: UTC+8 (MSK+5)
- Postal codes: 666320, 666321, 666322
- OKTMO ID: 25608151051
- Website: залари.рф

Zalari (Russian: Залари́; Buryat: Залари, Zalari) is an urban locality (an urban-type settlement) in Zalarinsky District of Irkutsk Oblast, Russia. Population: 9,600 (2010 census); 10,041 (2002 census); 10,693 (1989 Soviet census).
