= Balagansky District =

Balagansky District Балаганский район (Russian)
- District
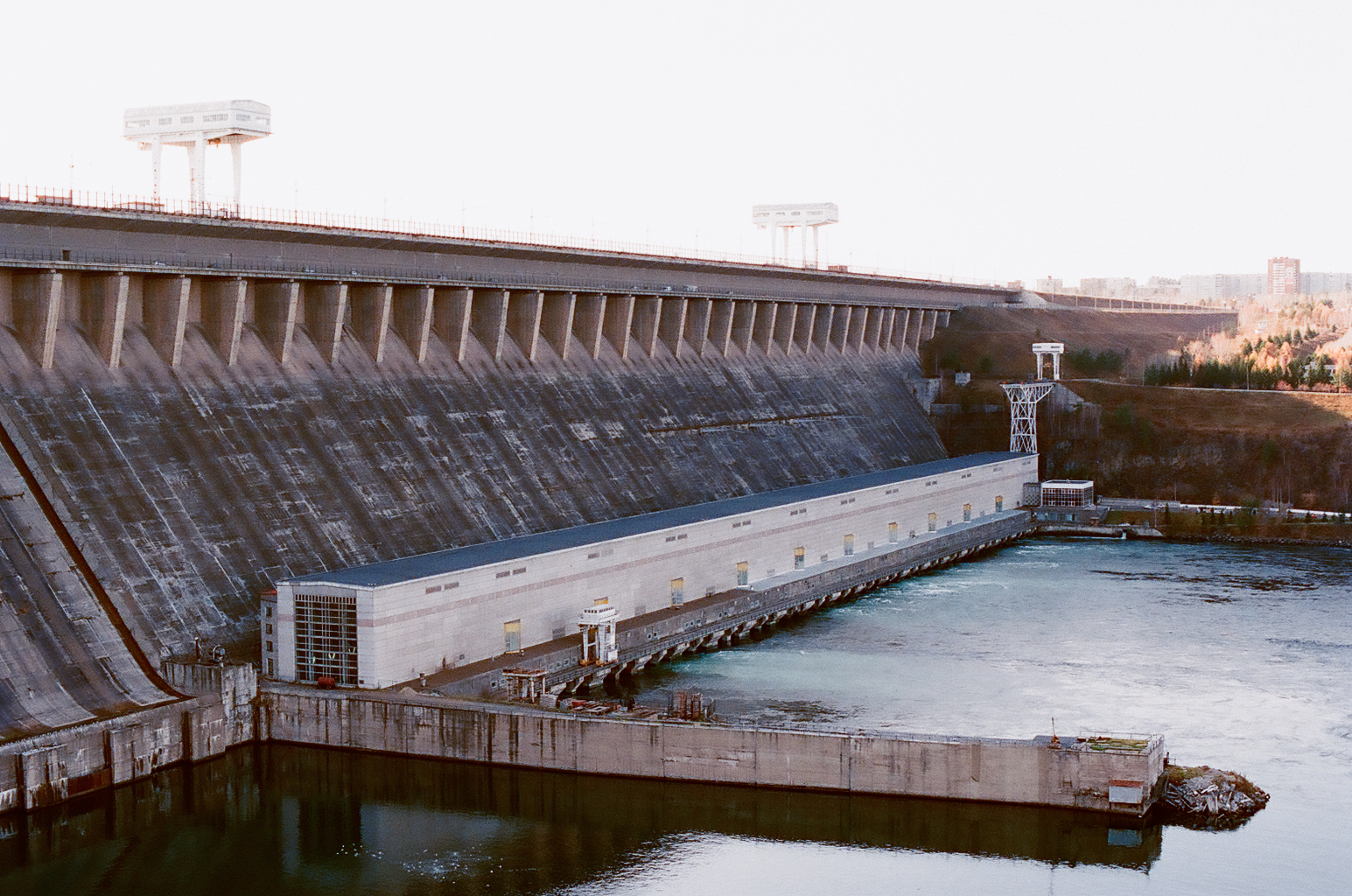
- Bratsk Hydroelectric Power Station, Balagansk, Balagansky District

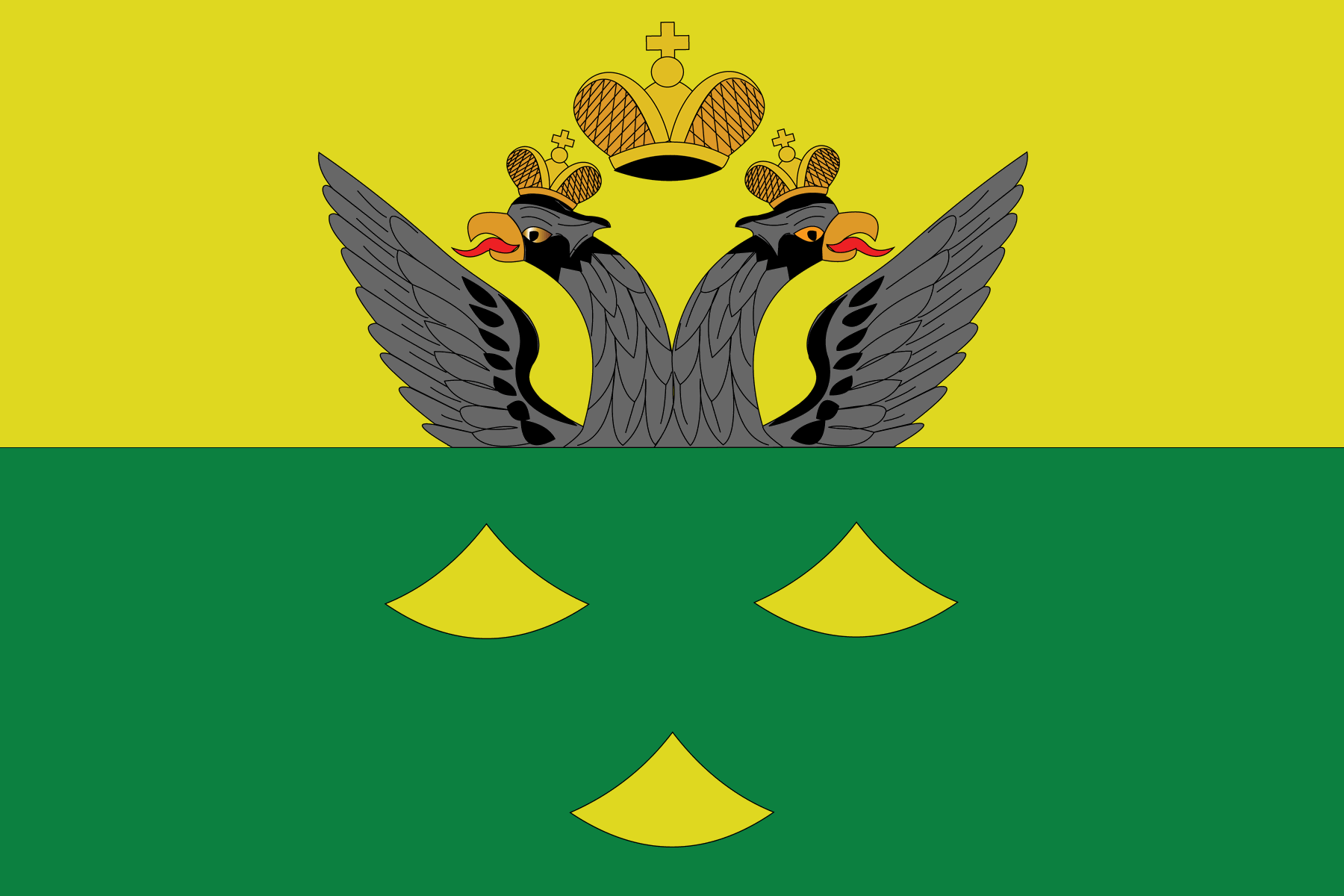
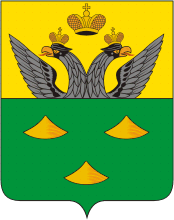
- Flag Coat of arms
- Location of Balagansky District in Irkutsk Oblast
- Coordinates: 54°01′N 103°06′E
- Country: Russia
- Federal subject: Irkutsk Oblast
- Established: 1989
- Administrative center: Balagansk

Area
  - Total: 6,634.7 km^{2} (2,561.7 sq mi)

Population (2010 Census)
  - Total: 9,194
  - Density: 1.386/km^{2} (3.589/sq mi)
  - Urban: 44.7%
  - Rural: 55.3%

Administrative structure
  - Inhabited localities: 1 urban-type settlements, 12 rural localities

Municipal structure
  - Municipally incorporated as: Balagansky Municipal District
  - Municipal divisions: 1 urban settlements, 6 rural settlements
- Time zone: UTC+8 (MSK+5)
- OKTMO ID: 25601000
- Website: http://adminbalagansk.ru

Balagansky District (Russian: Балаганский райо́н) is an administrative district, one of the thirty-three in Irkutsk Oblast, Russia. Municipally, it is incorporated as Balagansky Municipal District. The area of the district is 6,634.7 square kilometers (2,561.7 sq mi). Its administrative center is the urban locality (a work settlement) of Balagansk. Population: 9,194 (2010 census); 9,973 (2002 Census). The population of Balagansk accounts for 44.7% of the district's total population.

== History ==
Balagansk was founded in 1654 by the Kazak detachment led by Dmitry Firsov on the left bank of the Angara River opposite to the mouth of the Unga River, in the course of Russian colonization of Siberia. The name Balagansk originates from the Bulagat, literally sable hunters, a Buryat tribe. From 1655, mass settlement started in the area; eventually, a colony was built and iron mining developed. Balagansk Fortress (ostrog) was built in Balagansk, to which the Buryats were attached to and they paid tributes to the Russians. Buryats grew to dominate the area and on April 1, 1818, seventeen clans of the Balagansk Buryats met and adopted a memorandum to submit to the Russian authorities. In their memorandum they raised six issues and also provided action to be taken on each of them which related to courts, private law, criminal law, the rights and duties of the chief Taisha and heads of clans.

In the course of the administrative reform carried out in 1708 by Peter the Great, the territory was included into Siberia Governorate. In 1764, Irkutsk Governorate split off, and in 1775, Balagansk was granted town status and became the seat of Balagansky Uyezd of Irkutsk Governorate. In 1924, the uyezds was abolished, the governorate split into districts, and Balagansk was moved to Ziminsky District. In 1925, it lost town status and was downgraded to a selo. In 1926, Balagansky District was established, and Balagansk became the district's administrative center.

During the construction of Bratsk Hydroelectric Power Station Balagansk disappeared under water. The name was inherited by a new settlement, which was previously known as Novobalagansk. It was founded in 1957 several dozens kilometers south of the original location of Balagansk, and on June 5, 1962 it was renamed Balagansk and granted urban-type settlement status. In 1962, Balagansky District was abolished and split between Zalarinsky and Ust-Udinsky Districts. Balagansk was transferred to Zalarinsky District, and in 1965 it was moved to Ust-Udinsky District In 1989, Balagansky District was re-established, with the administrative center in Balagansk.
