= Zalarinsky District =

Zalarinsky District Заларинский район (Russian)
- District
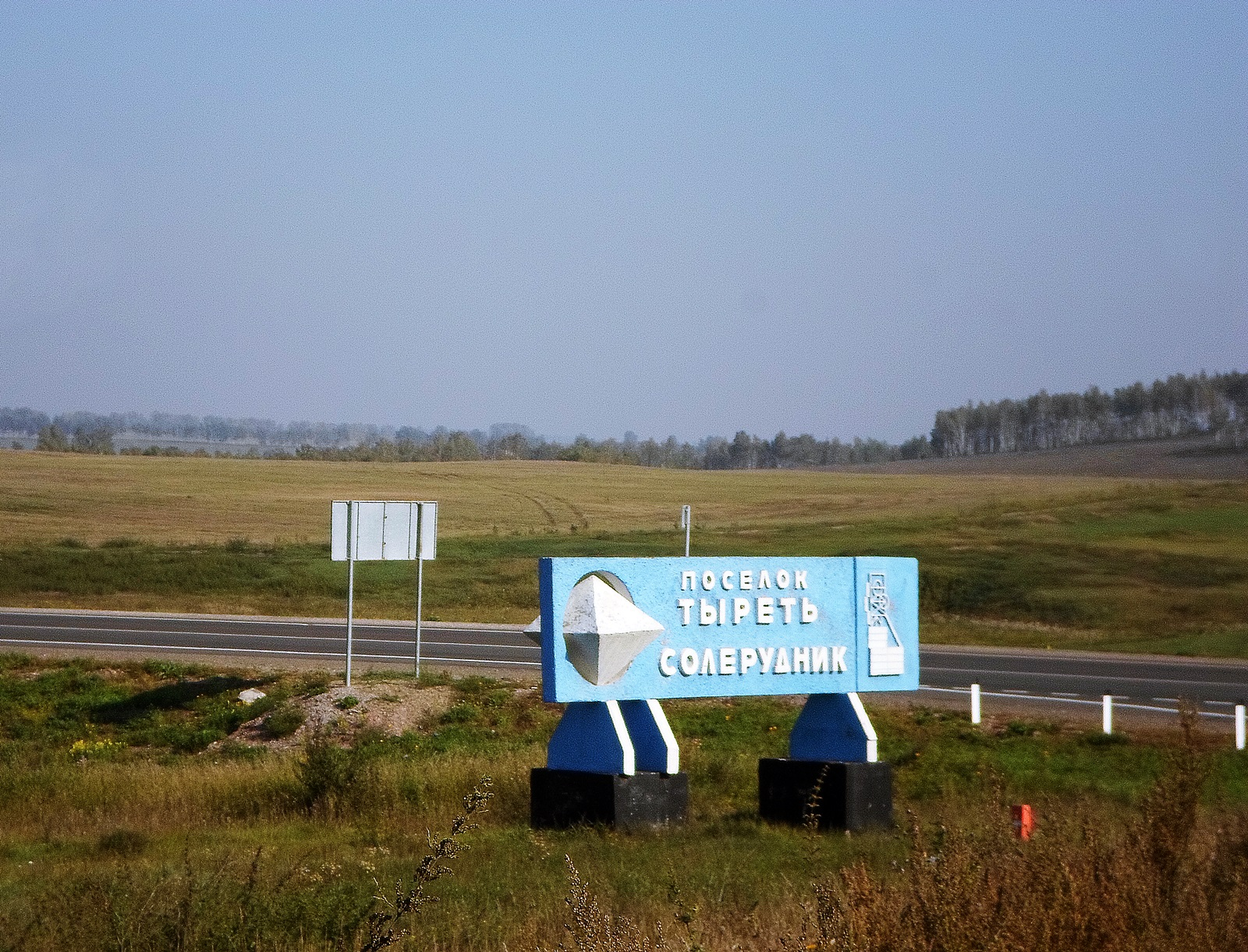
- On Road R255, village Tyret-1, Zalarinsky District

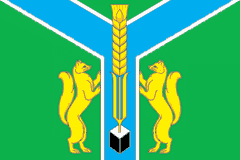
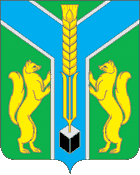
- Flag Coat of arms
- Location of Zalarinsky District in Irkutsk Oblast
- Coordinates: 53°34′N 102°30′E
- Country: Russia
- Federal subject: Irkutsk Oblast
- Established: 1925
- Administrative center: Zalari

Area
  - Total: 7,540 km^{2} (2,910 sq mi)

Population (2010 Census)
  - Total: 28,229
  - Density: 3.74/km^{2} (9.70/sq mi)
  - Urban: 47.7%
  - Rural: 52.3%

Administrative structure
  - Inhabited localities: 2 urban-type settlements, 69 rural localities

Municipal structure
  - Municipally incorporated as: Zalarinsky Municipal District
  - Municipal divisions: 2 urban settlements, 13 rural settlements
- Time zone: UTC+8 (MSK+5)
- OKTMO ID: 25608000
- Website: https://залари.рф/

Zalarinsky District (Russian: Залари́нский райо́н) is an administrative district, one of the thirty-three in Irkutsk Oblast, Russia. Municipally, it is incorporated as Zalarinsky Municipal District. Its administrative center is the urban locality (a work settlement) of Zalari. Population: 28,229 (2010 census); 32,010 (2002 Census); 33,117 (1989 Soviet census). The population of Zalari accounts for 34.0% of the district's total population.
