= Kuytunsky District =

Kuytunsky District Куйтунский район (Russian)
- District
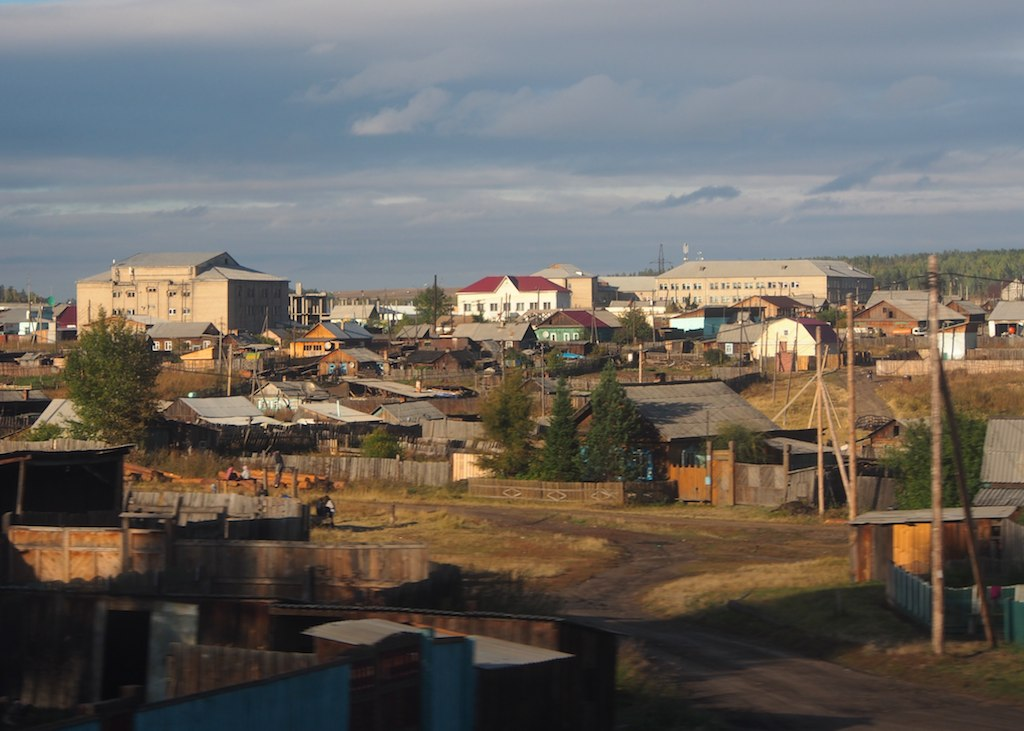
- View from the Trans-Siberian Railway, Kuytunsky District

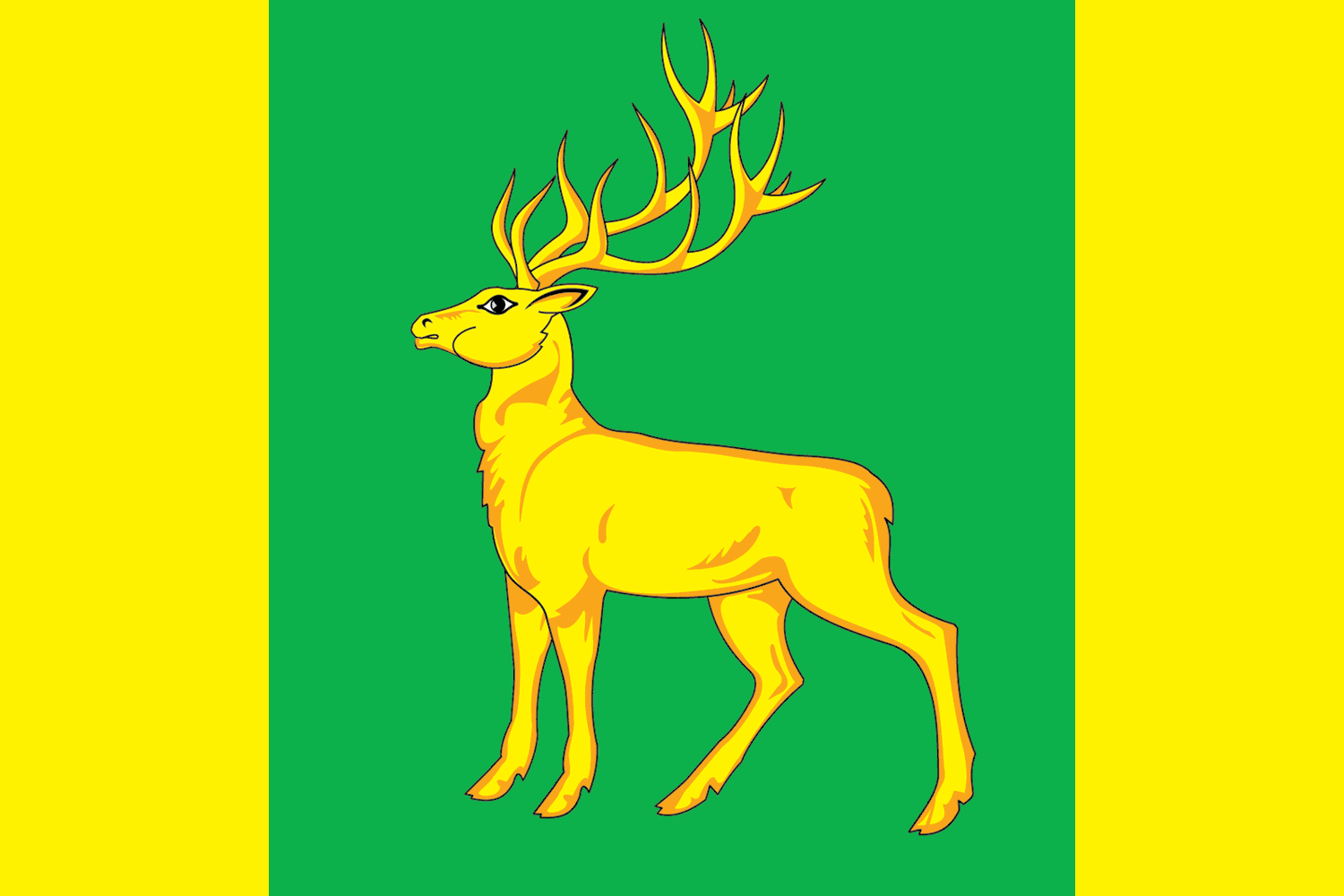
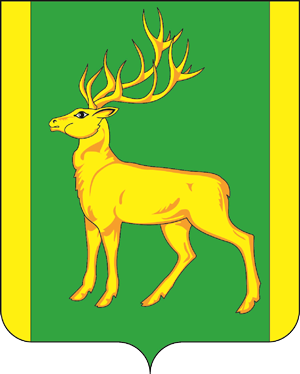
- Flag Coat of arms
- Location of Kuytunsky District in Irkutsk Oblast
- Coordinates: 54°21′N 101°31′E
- Country: Russia
- Federal subject: Irkutsk Oblast
- Administrative center: Kuytun

Area
  - Total: 11,200 km^{2} (4,300 sq mi)

Population (2010 Census)
  - Total: 31,856
  - Density: 2.84/km^{2} (7.37/sq mi)
  - Urban: 31.7%
  - Rural: 68.3%

Administrative structure
  - Inhabited localities: 1 urban-type settlements, 66 rural localities

Municipal structure
  - Municipally incorporated as: Kuytunsky Municipal District
  - Municipal divisions: 1 urban settlements, 20 rural settlements
- Time zone: UTC+8 (MSK+5)
- OKTMO ID: 25622000
- Website: http://kuitun.irkobl.ru/

Kuytunsky District (Russian: Куйтунский райо́н) is an administrative district, one of the thirty-three in Irkutsk Oblast, Russia. Municipally, it is incorporated as Kuytunsky Municipal District. The area of the district is 11,200 square kilometers (4,300 sq mi). Its administrative center is the urban locality (a work settlement) of Kuytun. Population: 31,856 (2010 census); 38,311 (2002 Census); 42,455 (1989 Soviet census). The population of Kuytun accounts for 31.7% of the district's total population.
