= Chunsky District =

Chunsky District Чунский район (Russian)
- District
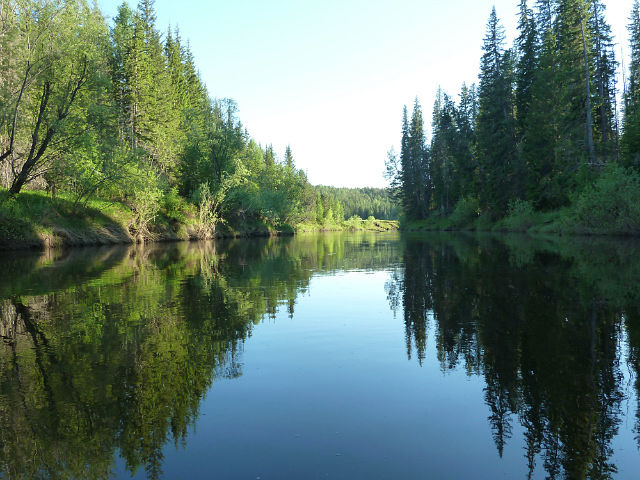
- Mura River, Chunsky District

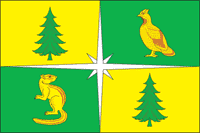
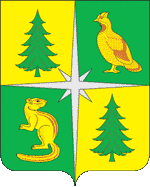
- Flag Coat of arms
- Location of Chunsky District in Irkutsk Oblast
- Coordinates: 56°50′N 99°38′E
- Country: Russia
- Federal subject: Irkutsk Oblast
- Established: 12 December 1953
- Administrative center: Chunsky

Area
  - Total: 25,790 km^{2} (9,960 sq mi)

Population (2010 Census)
  - Total: 36,516
  - Density: 1.416/km^{2} (3.667/sq mi)
  - Urban: 71.0%
  - Rural: 29.0%

Administrative structure
  - Inhabited localities: 3 urban-type settlements, 36 rural localities

Municipal structure
  - Municipally incorporated as: Chunsky Municipal District
  - Municipal divisions: 3 urban settlements, 8 rural settlements
- Time zone: UTC+8 (MSK+5)
- OKTMO ID: 25650000
- Website: http://chuna.irkobl.ru/

Chunsky District (Russian: Чунский райо́н) is an administrative district, one of the thirty-three in Irkutsk Oblast, Russia. Municipally, it is incorporated as Chunsky Municipal District. The area of the district is 25,790 square kilometers (9,960 sq mi). Its administrative center is the urban locality (a work settlement) of Chunsky. Population: 36,516 (2010 census); 41,829 (2002 Census); 50,037 (1989 Soviet census). The population of the administrative center accounts for 41.1% of the district's total population.
