= Sayansk =

Town in Irkutsk Oblast, Russia

Sayansk Саянск
- Town
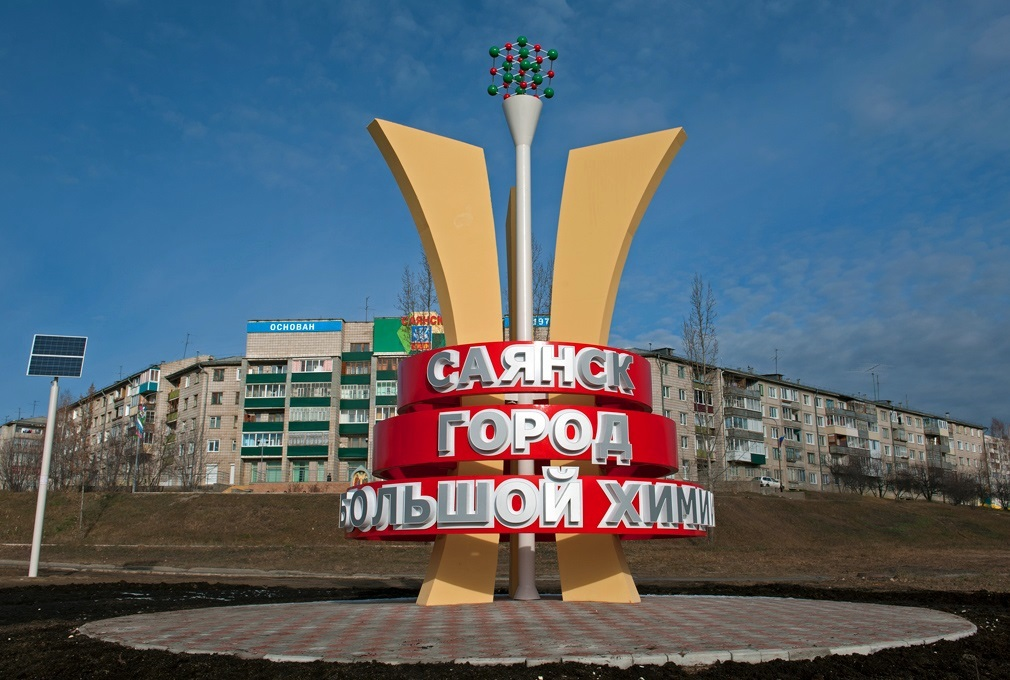
- Entrance to the city

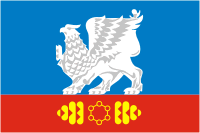
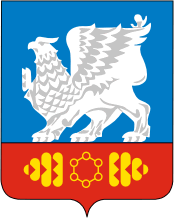
- Flag Coat of arms
- Interactive map of Sayansk
- Location of Sayansk Sayansk (Irkutsk Oblast)
- Coordinates: 54°07′N 102°10′E
- Country: Russia
- Federal subject: Irkutsk Oblast
- Founded: 1970
- Elevation: 550 m (1,800 ft)

Population (2010 Census)
  - Total: 40,800
  - Estimate (2021): 35,561 (−12.8%)

Administrative status
  - Subordinated to: Town of Sayansk
  - Capital of: Town of Sayansk

Municipal status
  - Urban okrug: Sayansk Urban Okrug
  - Capital of: Sayansk Urban Okrug
- Time zone: UTC+8 (MSK+5)
- Postal code: 666300–666305
- Dialing code: +7 39553
- OKTMO ID: 25726000001
- Website: www.admsayansk.ru

Sayansk (Russian: Саянск, IPA: [sɐˈjansk]) is a town in Irkutsk Oblast, Russia, located on the Oka River (Angara River's basin) 270 kilometers (170 mi) northwest of Irkutsk. Population: 40,800 (2010 census); 43,468 (2002 census); 38,169 (1989 Soviet census).

== History ==
Sayansk was founded in 1970. It was granted urban-type settlement status in 1975 and town status in 1985.

== Administrative and municipal status ==
Within the framework of administrative divisions, it is incorporated as the Town of Sayansk—an administrative unit with the status equal to that of the districts. As a municipal division, the Town of Sayansk is incorporated as Sayansk Urban Okrug.
