= Kachugsky District =

Kachugsky District Качугский район (Russian)
- District
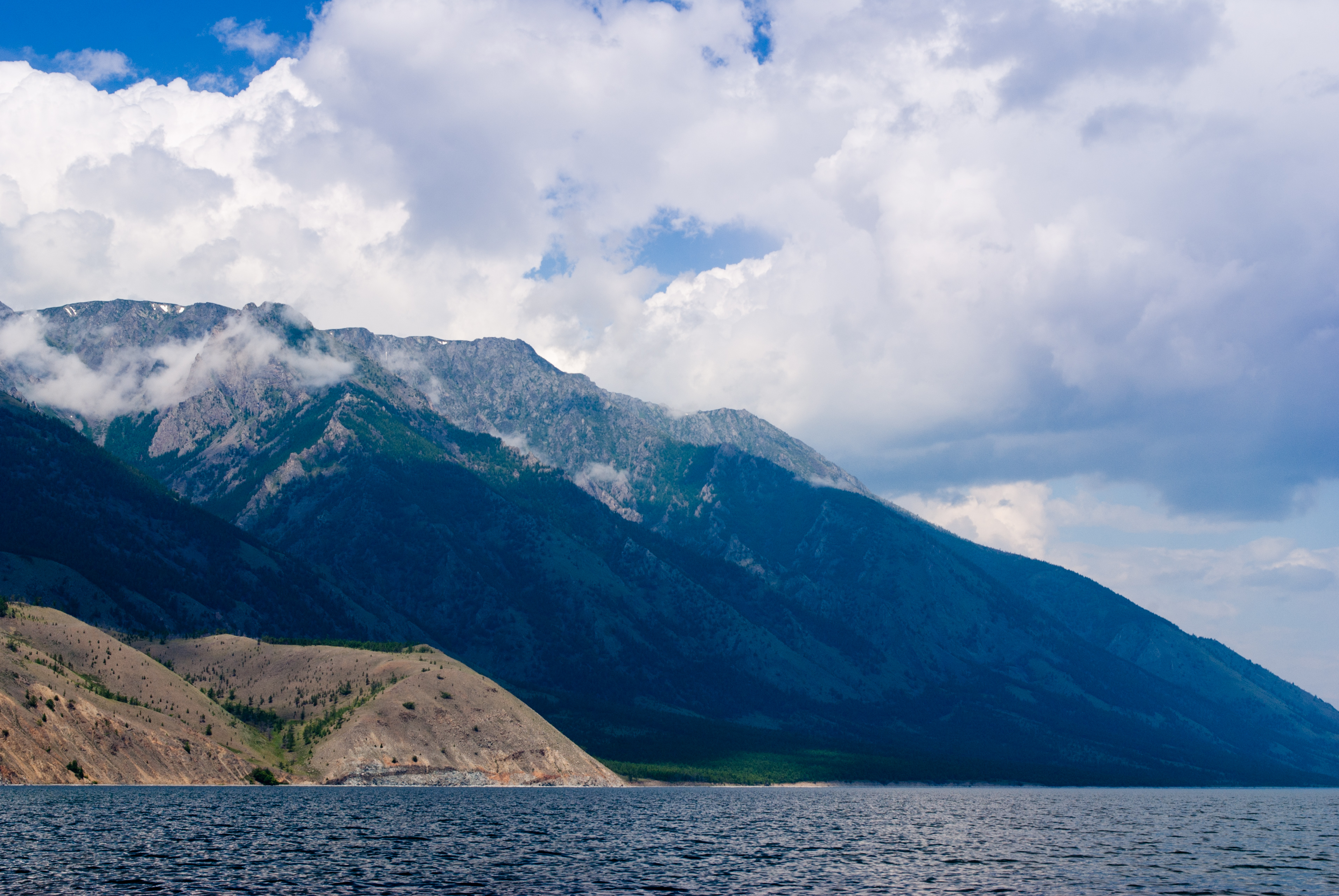
- Baikal-Lena Nature Reserve, on the northwest shore of Lake Baikal in Kachugsky District

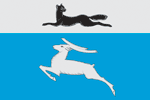
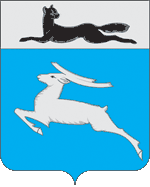
- Flag Coat of arms
- Location of Kachugsky District (#14) in east-central Irkutsk Oblast
- Coordinates: 53°58′N 105°52′E
- Country: Russia
- Federal subject: Irkutsk Oblast
- Established: 28 June 1926
- Administrative center: Kachug

Area
  - Total: 32,000 km^{2} (12,000 sq mi)

Population (2010 Census)
  - Total: 17,388
  - Density: 0.54/km^{2} (1.4/sq mi)
  - Urban: 40.3%
  - Rural: 59.7%

Administrative structure
  - Inhabited localities: 1 urban-type settlements, 76 rural localities

Municipal structure
  - Municipally incorporated as: Kachugsky Municipal District
  - Municipal divisions: 1 urban settlements, 13 rural settlements
- Time zone: UTC+8 (MSK+5)
- OKTMO ID: 25618000

Kachugsky District (Russian: Качугский райо́н) is an administrative district, one of the thirty-three in Irkutsk Oblast, Russia. Municipally, it is incorporated as Kachugsky Municipal District. The area of the district is 32,000 square kilometers (12,000 sq mi). Its administrative center is the urban locality (a work settlement) of Kachug. Population: 17,388 (2010 census); 20,501 (2002 Census); 23,026 (1989 Soviet census). The population of Kachug accounts for 40.3% of the district's total population.
