= Ust-Udinsky District =

Ust-Udinsky District Усть-Удинский район (Russian)
- District
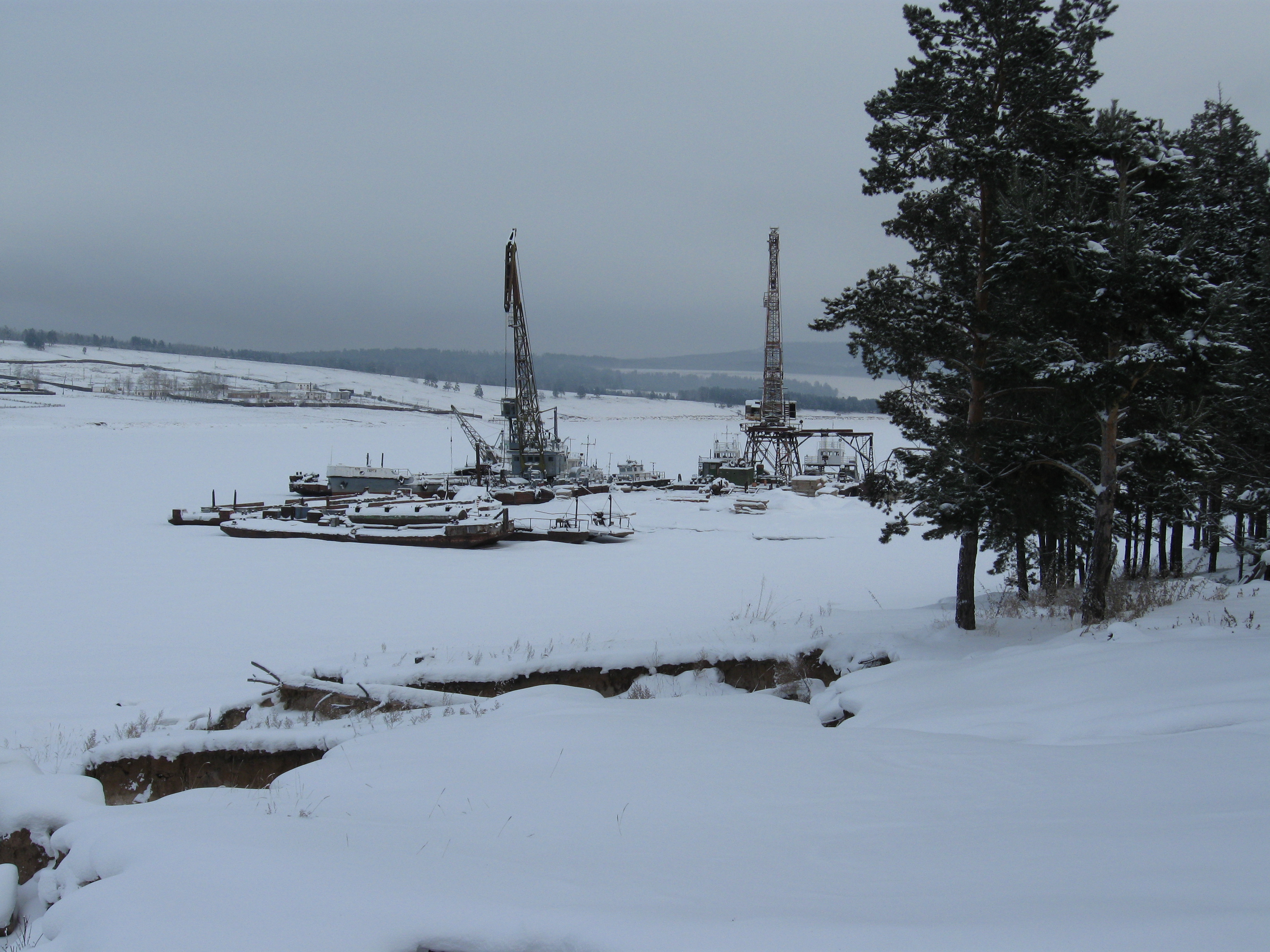
- Oil production, Ust-Udinsky District

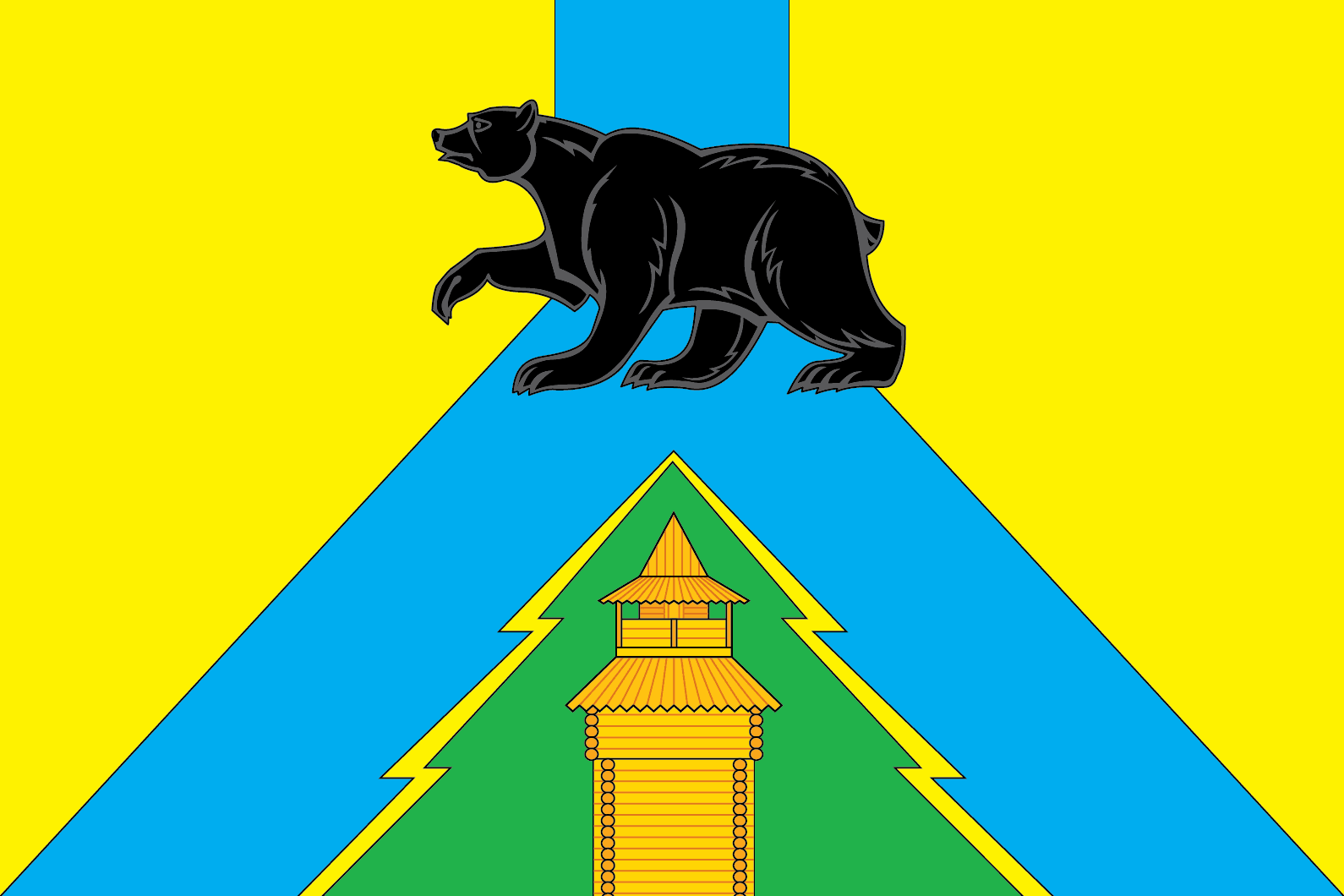
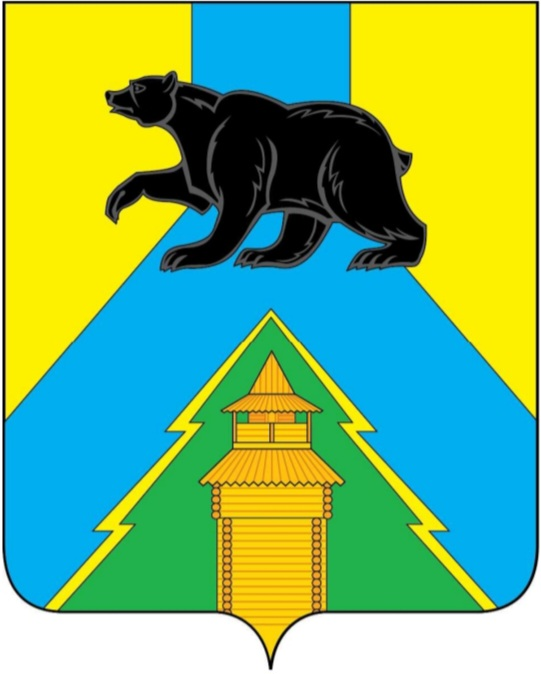
- Flag Coat of arms
- Location of Ust-Udinsky District in Irkutsk Oblast
- Coordinates: 55°39′N 104°36′E
- Country: Russia
- Federal subject: Irkutsk Oblast
- Established: 1926
- Administrative center: Ust-Uda

Area
  - Total: 20,400 km^{2} (7,900 sq mi)

Population (2010 Census)
  - Total: 14,385
  - Density: 0.705/km^{2} (1.83/sq mi)
  - Urban: 36.0%
  - Rural: 64.0%

Administrative structure
  - Inhabited localities: 1 urban-type settlements, 24 rural localities

Municipal structure
  - Municipally incorporated as: Ust-Udinsky Municipal District
  - Municipal divisions: 1 urban settlements, 13 rural settlements
- Time zone: UTC+8 (MSK+5)
- OKTMO ID: 25646000
- Website: http://adminust-uda.ru/

Ust-Udinsky District (Russian: Усть-Удинский райо́н) is an administrative district, one of the thirty-three in Irkutsk Oblast, Russia. Municipally, it is incorporated as Ust-Udinsky Municipal District. The area of the district is 20,400 square kilometers (7,900 sq mi). Its administrative center is the urban locality (a work settlement) of Ust-Uda. Population: 14,385 (2010 census); 16,747 (2002 Census); 28,790 (1989 Soviet census). The population of Ust-Uda accounts for 36.0% of the district's total population.
