= Tarbagatay, Tarbagataysky District, Republic of Buryatia =

Village in Tarbagataysky District, Buryatia

Coordinates: 51°28′50″N 107°21′35″E

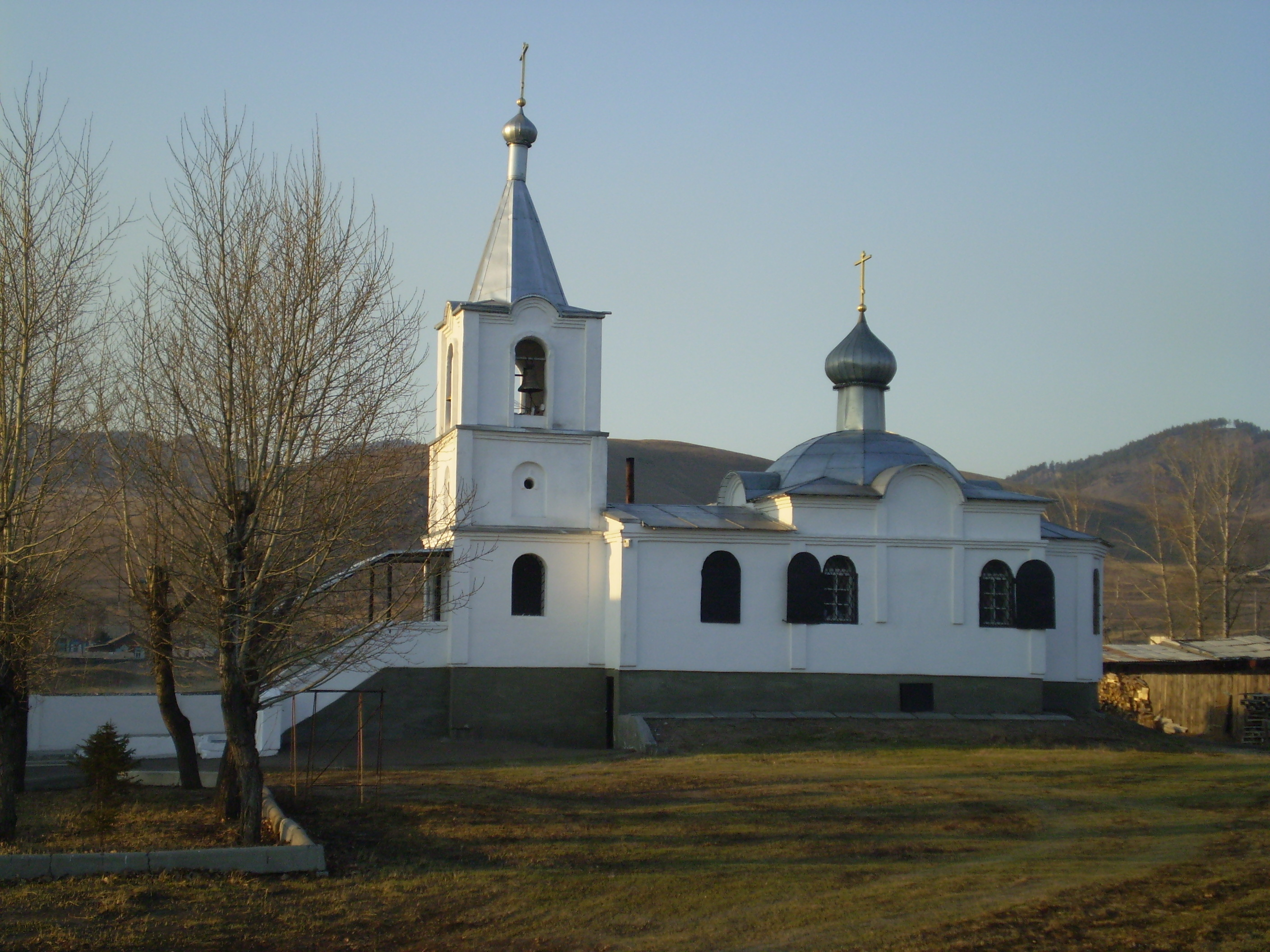
Church in the village of Tarbagatay

Tarbagatay (Russian: Тарбагата́й; Buryat: Тарбагата, Tarbagata) is a rural locality (a selo) in Tarbagataysky District of the Republic of Buryatia, Russia. Population: 4,308 (2010 census); 4,246 (2002 census);
