= Tarbagataysky District =

Tarbagataysky District Тарбагатайский район (Russian)
- District

Other transcription(s)
  - Buryat: Тарбагатайн аймаг
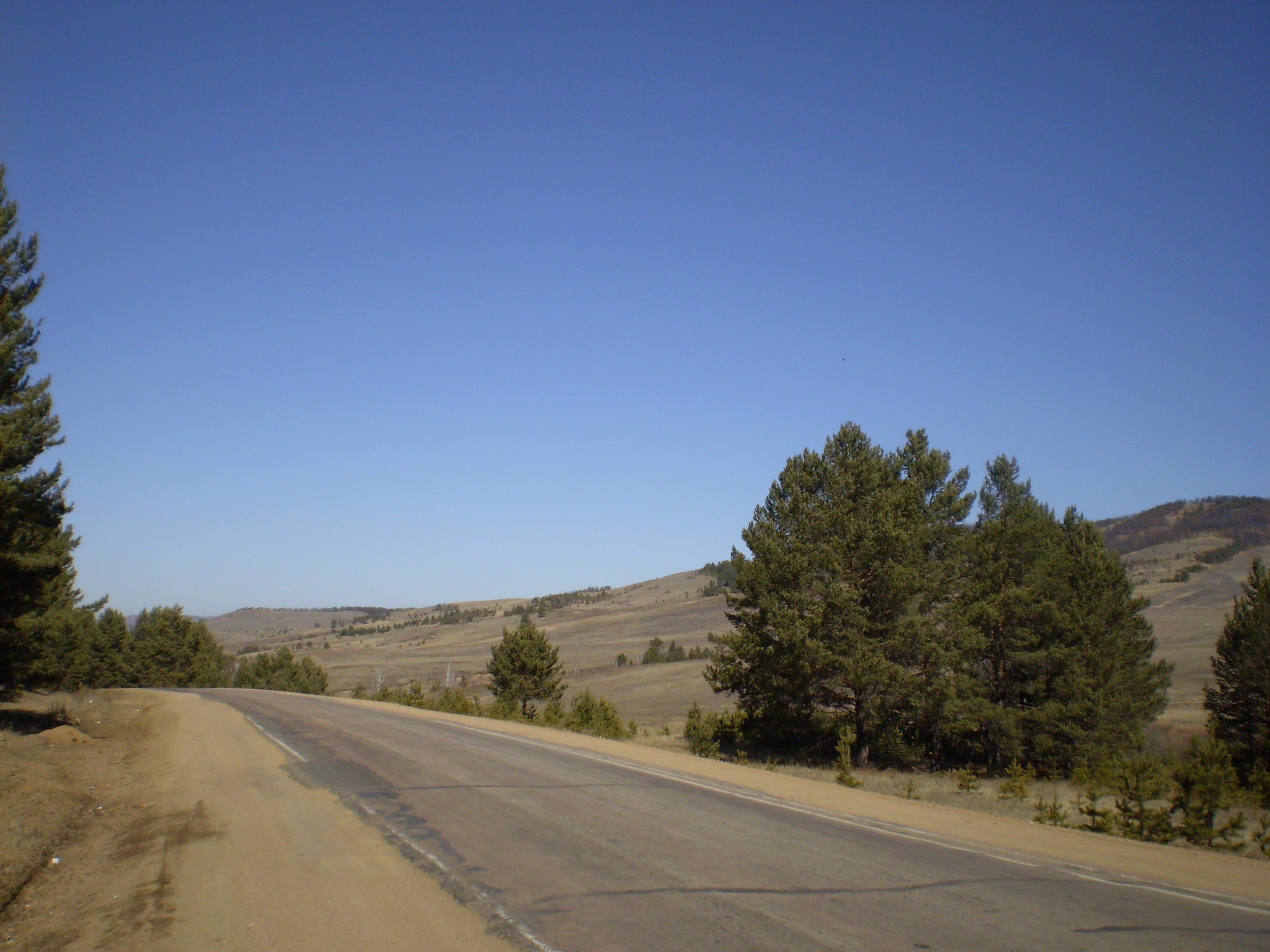
- Landscape in Tarbagataysky District

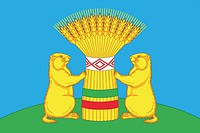
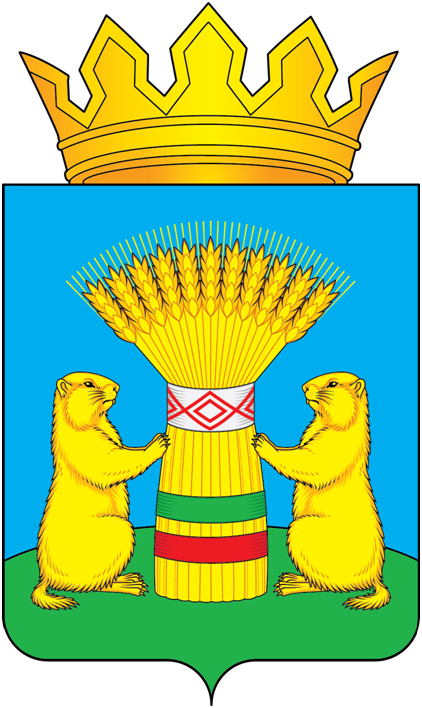
- Flag Coat of arms
- Location of Tarbagataysky District in the Republic of Buryatia
- Coordinates: 51.424°N 107.552°E
- Country: Russia
- Federal subject: Republic of Buryatia
- Established: October 1, 1933 (first); 1985 (second)
- Administrative center: Tarbagatay

Area
  - Total: 3,304 km^{2} (1,276 sq mi)

Population (2010 Census)
  - Total: 16,476
  - Density: 4.987/km^{2} (12.92/sq mi)
  - Urban: 0%
  - Rural: 100%

Administrative structure
  - Administrative divisions: 10 Selsoviets
  - Inhabited localities: 23 rural localities

Municipal structure
  - Municipally incorporated as: Tarbagataysky Municipal District
  - Municipal divisions: 0 urban settlements, 10 rural settlements
- Time zone: UTC+8 (MSK+5)
- OKTMO ID: 81650000
- Website: http://tarbagatay.ru

Tarbagataysky District (Russian: Тарбагата́йский райо́н; Russian Buryat: Тарбагатайн аймаг, Tarbagatain aimag) is an administrative and municipal district (raion), one of the twenty-one in the Republic of Buryatia, Russia. It is located in the center of the republic. The area of the district is 3,304 square kilometers (1,276 sq mi). Its administrative center is the rural locality (a selo) of Tarbagatay. As of the 2010 Census, the total population of the district was 16,476, with the population of Tarbagatay accounting for 26.2% of that number.

Historical population
Year	Pop.	±%
1926	22,400	—
1939	26,000	+16.1%
1979	17,500	−32.7%
1989	18,300	+4.6%
2002	16,287	−11.0%
2010	16,476	+1.2%
2021	25,600	+55.4%
Source: Census data

== Administrative and municipal status ==
Within the framework of administrative divisions, Tarbagataysky District is one of the twenty-one in the Republic of Buryatia. The district is divided into ten selsoviets, which comprise twenty-three rural localities. As a municipal division, the district is incorporated as Tarbagataysky Municipal District. Its ten selsoviets are incorporated as ten rural settlements within the municipal district. The selo of Tarbagatay serves as the administrative center of both the administrative and municipal district.
