= Angarsk constituency =

Constituency of the State Duma of the Russian Federation

Angarsk single-member constituency
- Constituency of the Russian State Duma

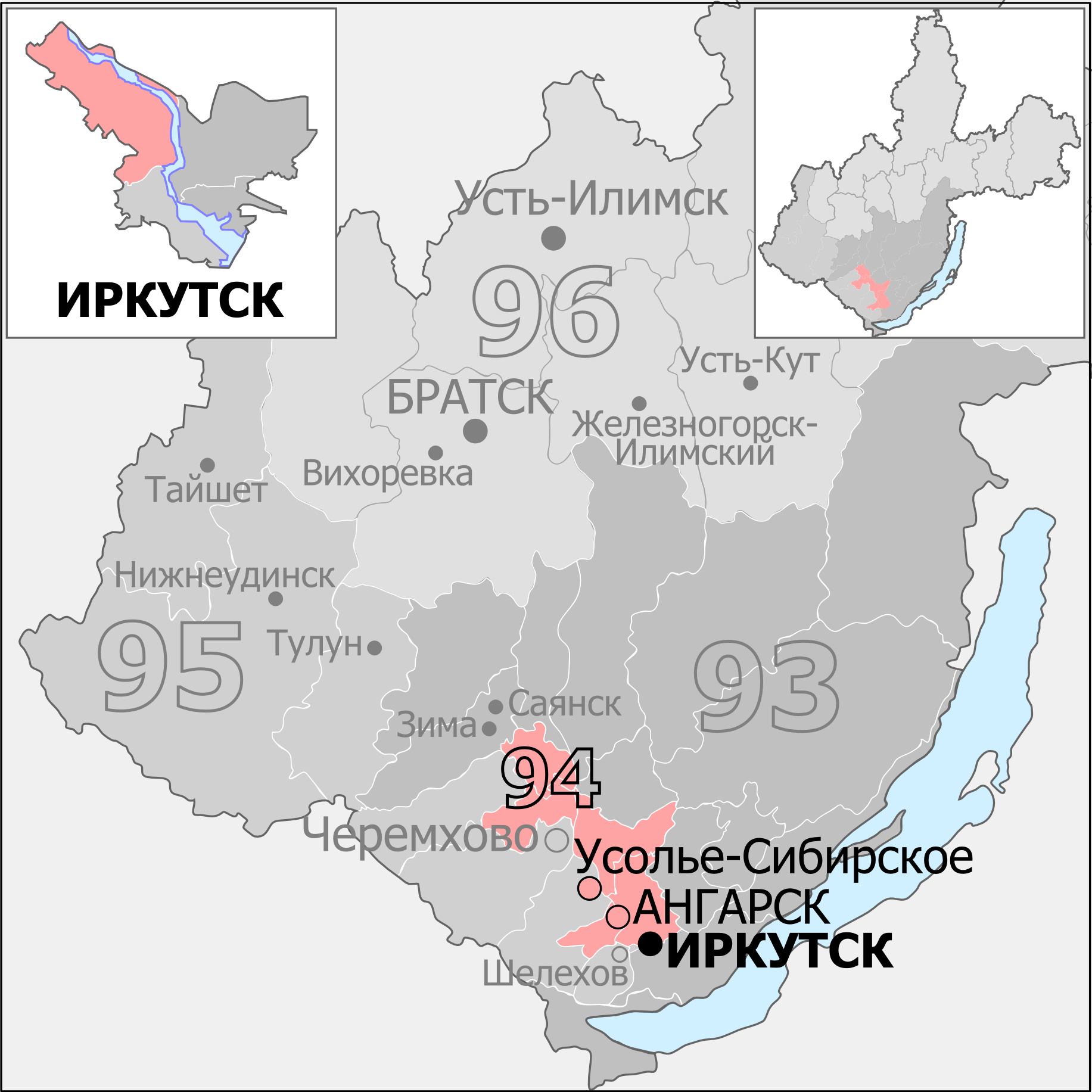
- Constituency boundaries since 2016
- Deputy: Vadim Logunov; United Russia
- Federal subject: Irkutsk Oblast
- Districts: Alarsky, Angarsky, Bokhansky, Irkutsk (Leninsky district), Irkutsky (Gorokhovskoe, Karlukskoe, Khomutovskoe, Maksimovskoe, Mamonovskoe, Nikolskoe, Oekskoe, Revyakinskoe, Shiryaevskoe, Sosnovoborskoe, Urikovskoe, Ust-Baleyskoe, Ust-Kudinskoe), Nukutsky, Svirsk, Usolye-Sibirskoye
- Voters: 468,578 (2026)

The Angarsk constituency (No.96 (Note: No.81 in 1993-1995, No.80 in 1995-2003, No.82 in 2003-2007, No.94 in 2016–2026)) is a Russian legislative constituency in Irkutsk Oblast. The constituency covers parts of central Irkutsk Oblast, stretching from northern Irkutsk to parts of former Ust-Orda Buryat Autonomous Okrug.

The constituency has been represented since 2026 by United Russia deputy Vadim Logunov, former Rostec executive and businessman, who won the open seat, succeeding one-term United Russia incumbent Anton Krasnoshtanov.

== Boundaries ==
1993–1995: Angarsk, Angarsky District, Cheremkhovo, Cheremkhovsky District, Irkutsky District, Kachugsky District, Olkhonsky District, Slyudyansky District, Usolsky District, Usolye-Sibirskoye, Zhigalovsky District
The constituency covered suburbs and exurbs around Irkutsk, including the cities of Angarsk and Cheremkhovo, as well as rural areas to the north of the city.

1995–2003: Angarsk, Angarsky District, Cheremkhovo, Cheremkhovsky District, Shelekhov, Shelekhovsky District, Slyudyansky District, Usolsky District, Usolye-Sibirskoye
The constituency was significantly altered following the 1995 redistricting, losing Irkutsky, Kachugsky, Olkhonsky and Zhigalovsky to Bratsk constituency. The seat instead gained industrial city Shelekhov and Shelekhovsky District from Irkutsk constituency.

2003–2007: Angarsk, Angarsky District, Cheremkhovo, Cheremkhovsky District, Kuytunsky District, Nizhneudinsk, Nizhneudinsky District, Sayansk, Shelekhovsky District, Tulun, Tulunsky District, Usolsky District, Usolye-Sibirskoye, Zalarinsky District, Zima, Ziminsky District
After the 2003 redistricting Irkutsk Oblast lost one of its four constituencies, so all remaining seats saw major changes. The constituency retained almost all of its territory, losing Shelekhov and Slyudyansky District in its south to Irkutsk constituency. This seat instead gained almost all of the dissolved Tulun constituency, including the cities of Nizhneudinsk, Sayansk, Tulun and Zima.

2016–present: Alarsky District, Angarsky District, Bokhansky District, Irkutsk (Leninsky district), Irkutsky District (Gorokhovskyoe, Karlukskoye, Khomutovskoye, Maksimovskoye, Mamonovskoye, Nikolskoye, Oyekskoye, Revyakinskoye, Shiryayevskoye, Sosnovoborskoye, Urikovskoye, Ust-Baleyskoye, Ust-Kudinskoye), Nukutsky District, Svirsk, Usolye-Sibirskoye
The constituency was re-created for the 2016 election and retained only Angarsk and Usolye-Sibirskoye, losing Sayansk and Zima to Irkutsk constituency and the rest (around 80% of its former territory) to re-created Shelekhov constituency. This seat instead gained Leninsky city district of Irkutsk and half of Irkutsky District from Irkutsk constituency as well as half of the eliminated Ust-Orda Buryat constituency.

== Members elected ==
Election	Member	Party
1993	Viktor Mashinsky	Independent
1995	Viktor Mashinsky	Bloc of Independents
1999	Konstantin Zaytsev	Independent
2003	Sergey Kolesnikov	People's Party
2007	Proportional representation - no election by constituency	
2011	Proportional representation - no election by constituency	
2016	Aleksey Krasnoshtanov	United Russia
2021	Anton Krasnoshtanov	United Russia
2026	Vadim Logunov	United Russia

== Election results ==
=== 1993 ===
Summary of the 12 December 1993 Russian legislative election in the Angarsk constituency
Candidate	Party	Votes	%
Viktor Mashinsky	Independent	90,119	39.12%
Oleg Malov	Independent	60,382	26.21%
Aleksandr Belov	Yavlinsky–Boldyrev–Lukin	34,734	15.08%
against all		28,882	12.54%
Total		230,390	100%

=== 1995 ===
Summary of the 17 December 1995 Russian legislative election in the Angarsk constituency
Candidate	Party	Votes	%
Viktor Mashinsky (incumbent)	Bloc of Independents	112,148	42.77%
Svetlana Koroleva	Our Home – Russia	34,838	13.29%
Aleksandr Lyuboslavky	Democratic Russia and Free Trade Unions	24,227	9.24%
Aleksandr Bessalov	Independent	24,178	9.22%
Pavel Aleshchenko	Independent	15,599	5.95%
Viktor Kuzmin	Independent	11,596	4.42%
Vadim Pisarevsky	Beer Lovers Party	6,393	2.44%
against all		28,461	10.86%
Total		262,182	100%

=== 1999 ===
Summary of the 19 December 1999 Russian legislative election in the Angarsk constituency
Candidate	Party	Votes	%
Konstantin Zaytsev	Independent	56,922	22.53%
Viktor Mashinsky (incumbent)	Party of Pensioners	55,699	22.04%
Yevgeny Kanukhin	Yabloko	42,856	16.96%
Aleksandr Keliberda	Independent	41,639	16.48%
Aleksandr Chernyshev	Independent	13,721	5.43%
Oleg Gubenko	Independent	8,728	3.45%
Valery Tarasov	Spiritual Heritage	1,704	0.67%
against all		24,470	10.91%
Total		224,365	100%

=== 2003 ===
Results by district: Sergey Kolesnikov: 30–40% 40–50% 50–60% 60–70%; Konstantin Zaytsev: 20–30% 30–40%; Valery Mankov: 20–30% 60–70%

Summary of the 7 December 2003 Russian legislative election in the Angarsk constituency
Candidate	Party	Votes	%
Sergey Kolesnikov (incumbent) (Note: redistricted from Tulun constituency)	People's Party	84,716	30.25%
Konstantin Zaytsev (incumbent)	United Russia	67,101	23.96%
Valery Mankov	Independent	41,780	14.92%
Vladimir Primachek	Communist Party	26,205	9.36%
Vladimir Shabanov	Liberal Democratic Party	10,737	3.83%
Lyudmila Drobysheva	Yabloko	8,876	3.17%
Irina Safronova	Independent	6,695	2.39%
Valery Kurochkin	Russian Pensioners' Party-Party of Social Justice	6,419	2.29%
against all		23,836	8.51%
Total		280,319	100%

=== 2016 ===
Summary of the 18 September 2016 Russian legislative election in the Angarsk constituency
Candidate	Party	Votes	%
Aleksey Krasnoshtanov	United Russia	80,306	51.74%
Sergey Brenyuk	Communist Party	25,918	16.70%
Oleg Kuznetsov	Liberal Democratic Party	12,717	8.19%
Maria Kotova	Patriots of Russia	9,793	6.31%
Aleksey Ponomarev	A Just Russia	6,386	4.11%
Olga Zhakova	People's Freedom Party	3,752	2.42%
Sergey Perevoznikov	The Greens	3,629	2.34%
Dmitry Zenov	Communists of Russia	3,007	1.94%
Olesya Kovaleva	Civilian Power	2,171	1.40%
Mikhail Toropov	Rodina	1,419	0.91%
Tatyana Kharun	Civic Platform	799	0.51%
Total		155,211	100%

=== 2021 ===
Summary of the 17-19 September 2021 Russian legislative election in the Angarsk constituency
Candidate	Party	Votes	%
Anton Krasnoshtanov	United Russia	69,413	41.35%
Andrey Akhmadulin	Communist Party	40,244	23.97%
Irina Smolyarova	New People	15,567	9.27%
Igor Zuyev	A Just Russia — For Truth	13,879	8.27%
Dmitry Tyutrin	Liberal Democratic Party	9,623	5.73%
Vladimir Kochanov	Party of Pensioners	7,603	4.53%
Yelizaveta Skobelkina	Rodina	2,361	1.41%
Eduard Gromatsky	Civic Platform	1,826	1.09%
Total		167,880	100%

=== 2026 ===
Summary of the 18-20 September 2026 Russian legislative election in the Angarsk constituency
Candidate	Party	Votes	%
Vadim Logunov	United Russia	65,207	37.33%
Andrey Akhmadulin	Communist Party	26,865	15.38%
Arkady Zhuravlev	Liberal Democratic Party	18,670	10.69%
Dmitry Lee	New People	16,217	9.28%
Mikhail Trufanov	A Just Russia	13,212	7.56%
Dmitry Ponomarenko	Yabloko	7,775	4.45%
Fanis Altynbayev	Communists of Russia	6,475	3.71%
Dmitry Bloshenko	Party of Pensioners	4,966	2.84%
Aleksey Krasnov	Rodina	3,198	1.83%
Artemy Zharkov	Party of Direct Democracy	2,140	1.23%
Aleksandr Latyntsev	The Greens	2,060	1.18%
Total		174,665	100%
