= Ziminsky =

Ziminsky (masculine), Ziminskaya (feminine), or Ziminskoye (neuter) may refer to:

- Ziminsky District, a district of Irkutsk Oblast, Russia
- Ziminskoye Urban Okrug, a municipal formation of Irkutsk Oblast, which the town of Zima is incorporated as
- 23003 Ziminski, a main-belt asteroid
- Mrs. Ziminsky, character in An American Girl: Chrissa Stands Strong
