= Iya (river) =

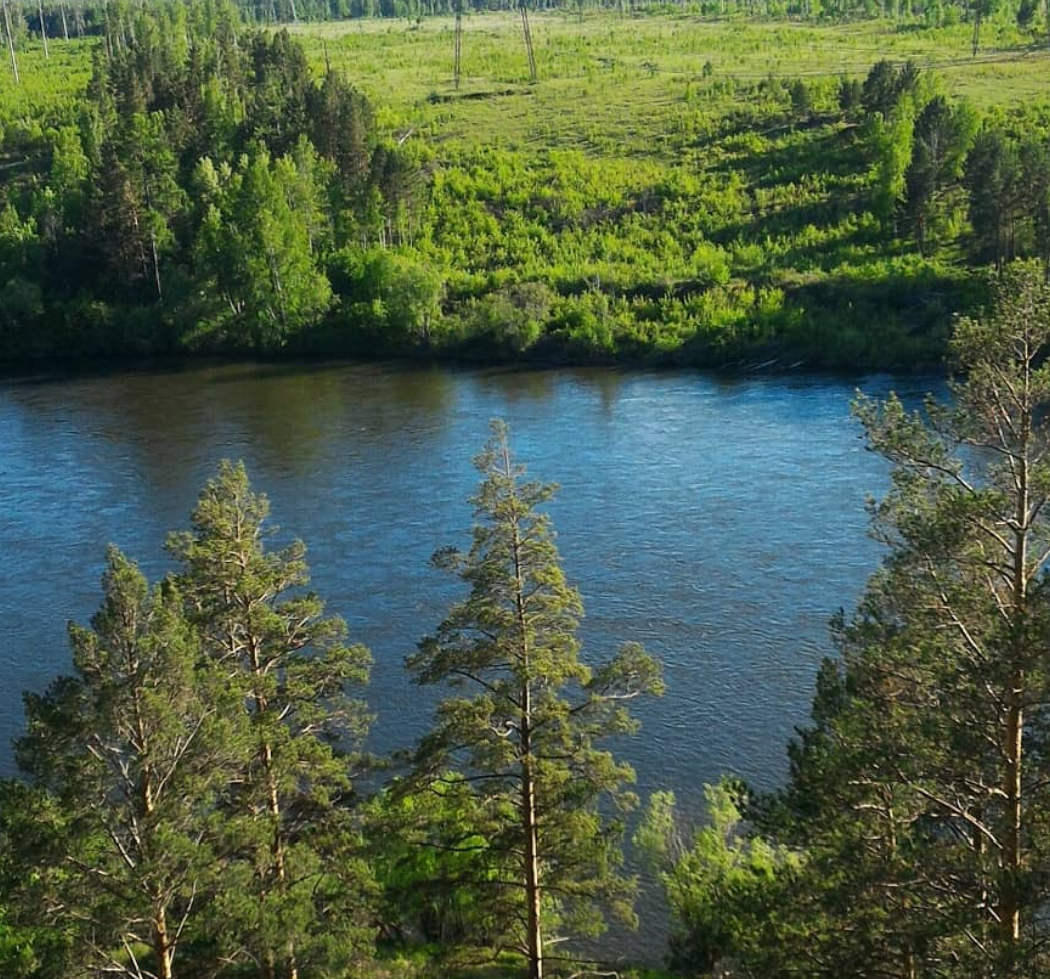
- The Iya in the vicinity of Tulun, Irkutsk Oblast

Location
- Country: Russia

Physical characteristics
- Mouth: Angara
  - location: Bratsk Reservoir
  - coordinates: 55°28′05″N 101°35′42″E
- Length: 484 km (301 mi)
- Basin size: 18,100 km^{2} (7,000 sq mi)

Basin features
- Progression: Angara→ Yenisey→ Kara Sea

The Iya (Russian: И́я) is a river in Irkutsk Oblast in Russia. The river is 484 kilometres (301 mi) long, and its basin covers 18,100 square kilometres (7,000 mi^{2}). The Iya flows into the Okinsky Bay of the Bratsk Reservoir. The river freezes up in late October or early November and stays icebound until late April or early May. The town Tulun lies on the Iya. Its main tributaries are the Kirey (from the right), Ikey, and Ilir (from the left).
