= Anton Krasnoshtanov =

Russian politician

- Антон Красноштанов
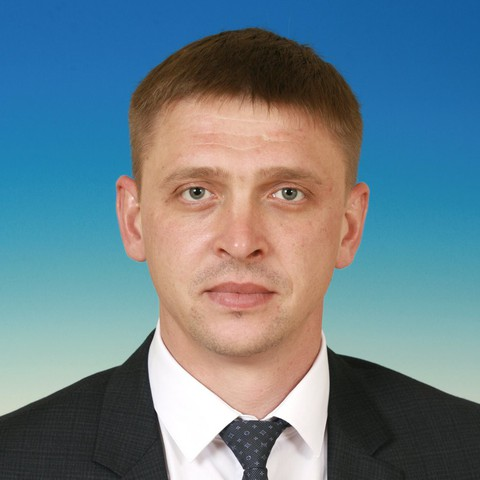
- official portrait, circa 2021

Member of the State Duma for Irkutsk Oblast
- Incumbent
- Assumed office 12 October 2021
- Preceded by: Aleksey Krasnoshtanov
- Constituency: Angarsk (No. 94)

Deputy of the Legislative Assembly of Irkutsk Oblast
- In office 2017–2020

Personal details
- Born: 10 June 1986 (age 39) Irkutsk, Russian SFSR, USSR
- Party: United Russia
- Parent: Aleksey Krasnoshtanov (father)
- Education: Siberian State Interregional College of Construction and Entrepreneurship; Irkutsk State University of Railways; RANEPA

Anton Alexeyevich Krasnoshtanov (Russian: Антон Алексеевич Красноштанов) is a Russian political figure and deputy of the 8th State Duma. He is the son of the deputy of the 7th State Duma Aleksey Krasnoshtanov.

In 2008, Anton Krasnoshtanov graduated from the Siberian State Interregional College of Construction and Entrepreneurship. In 2014, he also got a degree from the Irkutsk State Transport University. In 2017, he became the deputy of the Legislative Assembly of Irkutsk Oblast. He left his post in November 2020 to become a member of the Irkutsk administration. Since September 2021, he has served as deputy of the 8th State Duma.

== Sanctions ==
He was sanctioned by the UK government in 2022 in relation to the Russo-Ukrainian War.
