= List of universities in the Sakha Republic =

This is a list of universities in the Sakha Republic, a federal subject of the Russian Republic located in northeast Russia.

- International Institute of Management, LEU, Mirny Branch
- Arkhangelsk State Technical University
- Botanic Garden of the Irkutsk State University
- Krasnoyarsk State Agricultural University
- Krasnoyarsk State Trade and Economic Institute
- Siberian Federal University
- Leningrad State University, AS Pushkin, Norilsk Branch
- Krasnoyarsk State Pedagogical University, VP Astafieva, Norilsk Branch
- Norilsk Industrial Institute
