= Usolye-Sibirskoye =

Town in Irkutsk Oblast, Russia

Usolye-Sibirskoye Усолье-Сибирское
- Town
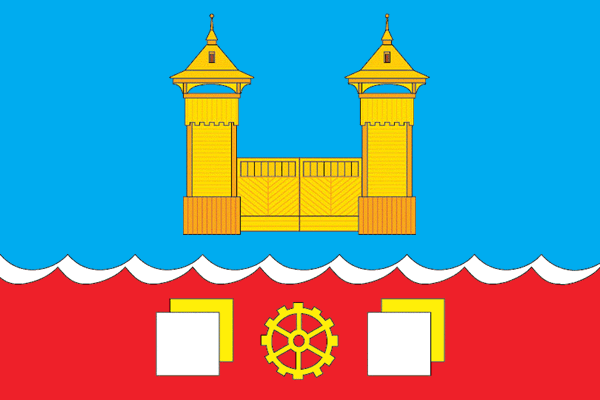
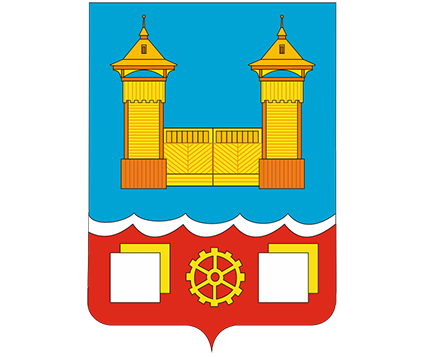
- Flag Coat of arms
- Interactive map of Usolye-Sibirskoye
- Location of Usolye-Sibirskoye Usolye-Sibirskoye (Irkutsk Oblast)
- Coordinates: 52°45′N 103°38′E
- Country: Russia
- Federal subject: Irkutsk Oblast
- Founded: 1669
- Town status since: 1925

Government
  - Mayor: Maxim Toropkin
- Elevation: 440 m (1,440 ft)

Population
  - Estimate (2025): 71,694 )
  - Rank: 197th in 2010

Administrative status
  - Subordinated to: Town of Usolye-Sibirskoye
  - Capital of: Town of Usolye-Sibirskoye

Municipal status
  - Urban okrug: Usolye-Sibirskoye Urban Okrug
  - Capital of: Usolye-Sibirskoye Urban Okrug
- Time zone: UTC+8 (MSK+5)
- Postal code: 665450–665467
- Dialing code: +7 39543
- OKTMO ID: 25736000001
- Website: www.usolie-sibirskoe.ru

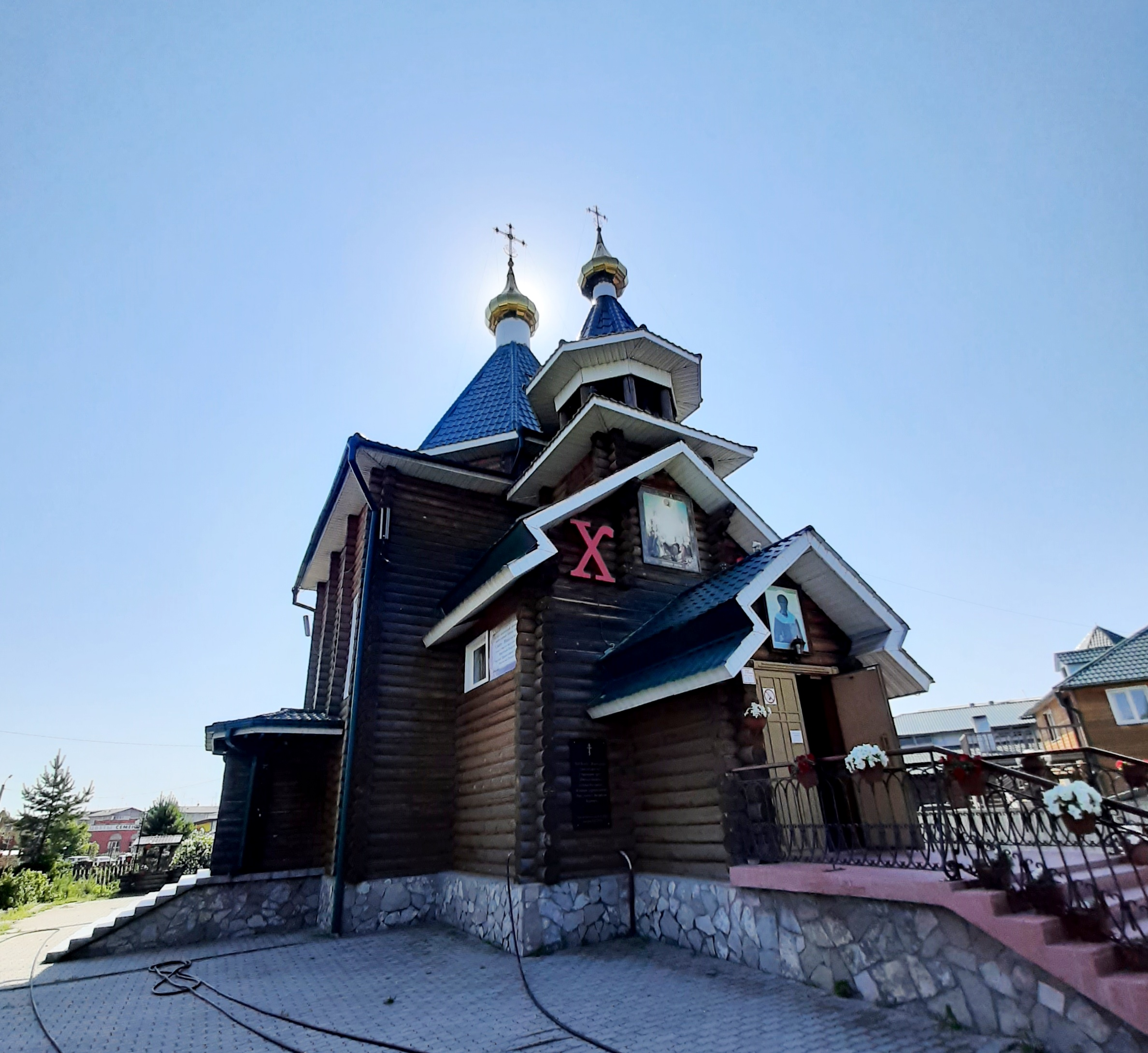
St. Nicholas church in Usolie-Sibirskoie

Usolye-Sibirskoye (Russian: Усолье-Сибирское, IPA: [ʊˈsolʲjə sʲɪˈbʲirskəjə]) is a town in Irkutsk Oblast, Russia, located on the left bank of the Angara River. Population: 74,762 (2021 census); 76,047 (2010 census); 90,161 (2002 census); 106,496 (1989 Soviet census).

== History ==
It was founded in 1669 under the name Usolye, an archaic Russian word for a salt producing town, by the Mikhalevs brothers, Cossacks who had discovered salt deposits in a nearby spring.

The Siberian Route was built through the town in the 18th century, followed in the late 19th century by the Trans-Siberian Railway.

Town status was granted to it in 1925. The town's name was given the extension Sibirskoye (Siberian) in 1940, to differentiate from the town of Usolye in the Kama River region.

From 1947 until 1953, the town hosted a prison camp of the gulag system.

== Administrative and municipal status ==
Within the framework of administrative divisions, it is incorporated separately as the Town of Usolye-Sibirskoye—an administrative unit with the status equal to that of the districts. As a municipal division, the Town of Usolye-Sibirskoye is incorporated as Usolye-Sibirskoye Urban Okrug.

Until November 2016, Usolye-Sibirskoye served as the administrative center of Usolsky District, even though it was not a part of it.

== Economy and infrastructure ==
Ever since its inception, the main industry of the town has been salt-mining. With the opening of a major mine in 1956, the town became Russia's largest producer of table salt. Related chemical industries such as Usolyekhimprom were also developed.

There is also assembly plant for heavy machinery, including mining equipment produced by the company Usolyemash.

The town has a station on the Trans-Siberian Railway, and is located on the highway from Novosibirsk to Irkutsk.

A tram network has operated since the 1960s, originally funded by the salt mine.

== Climate ==
Usolye-Sibirskoye has a dry-winter subarctic climate (Köppen climate classification: Dwc), featuring bitterly cold winters and short, warm summers.

Climate data for Usolye-Sibirskoye
Month	Jan	Feb	Mar	Apr	May	Jun	Jul	Aug	Sep	Oct	Nov	Dec	Year
Mean daily maximum °C (°F)	−19 (−2)	−15 (5)	−5 (23)	8 (46)	15 (59)	22 (72)	24 (75)	21 (70)	14 (57)	6 (43)	−5 (23)	−14 (7)	4 (40)
Mean daily minimum °C (°F)	−27 (−17)	−25 (−13)	−18 (0)	−7 (19)	3 (37)	9 (48)	12 (54)	10 (50)	4 (39)	−5 (23)	−16 (3)	−24 (−11)	−7 (19)
Average precipitation mm (inches)	5 (0.2)	10 (0.4)	10 (0.4)	20 (0.8)	25 (1.0)	50 (2.0)	100 (3.9)	70 (2.8)	40 (1.6)	25 (1.0)	15 (0.6)	15 (0.6)	385 (15.3)
Source: Yandex Pogoda

== Gallery ==
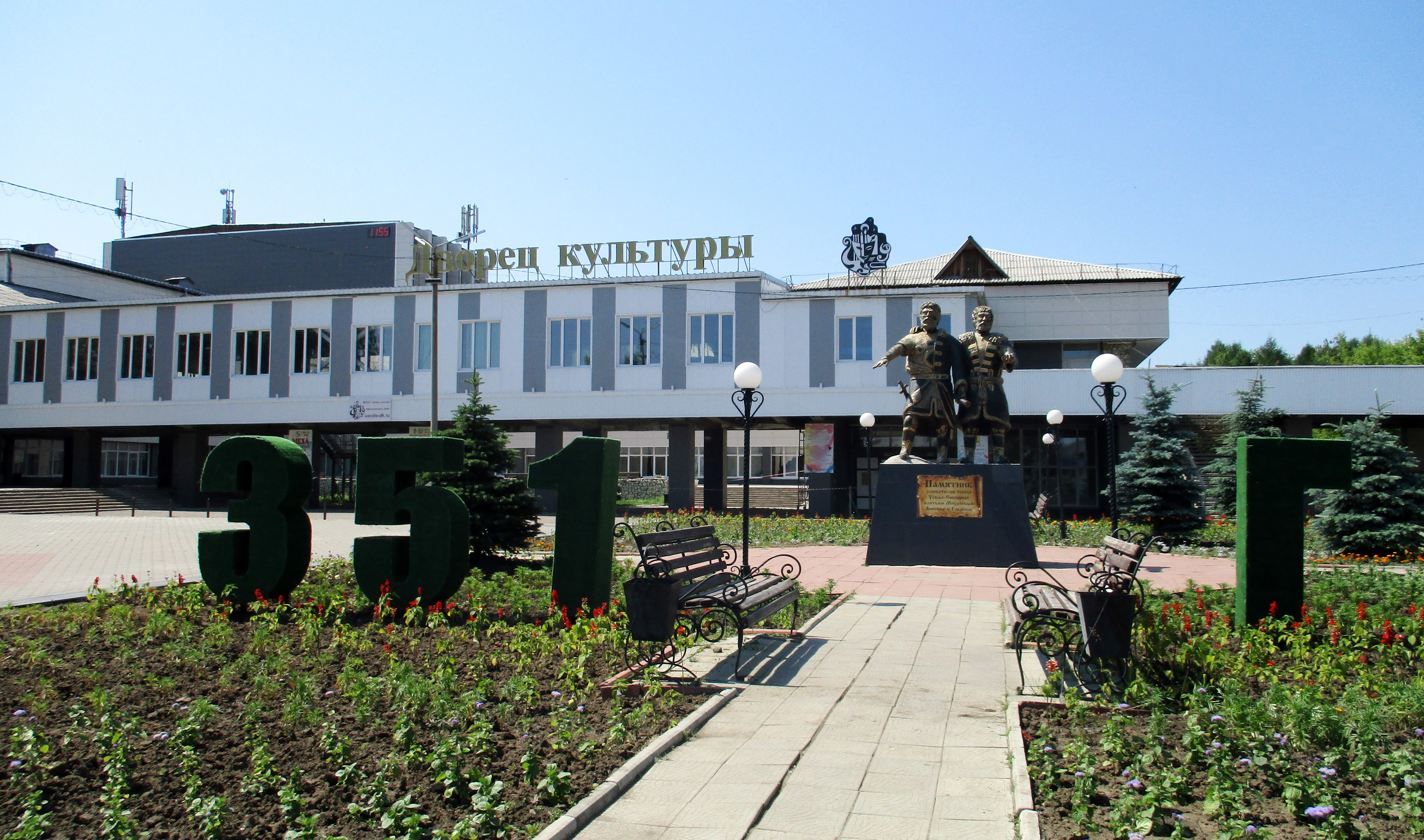
Palace of Culture and Monument to Anisim and Gavriil Mikhaliovs in Usoliie-Sibirskoie

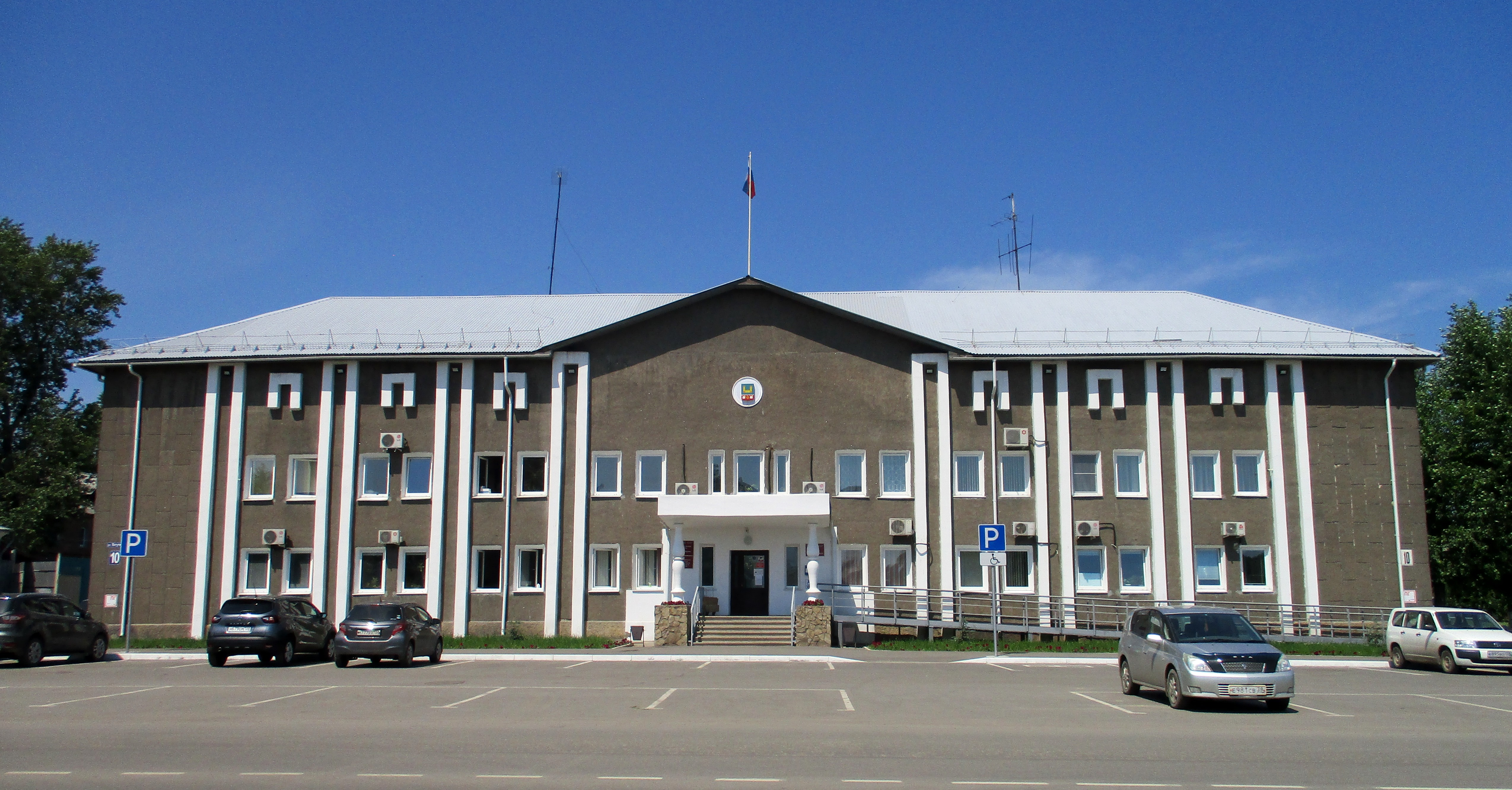
City Council of Usolie-Sibirskoie

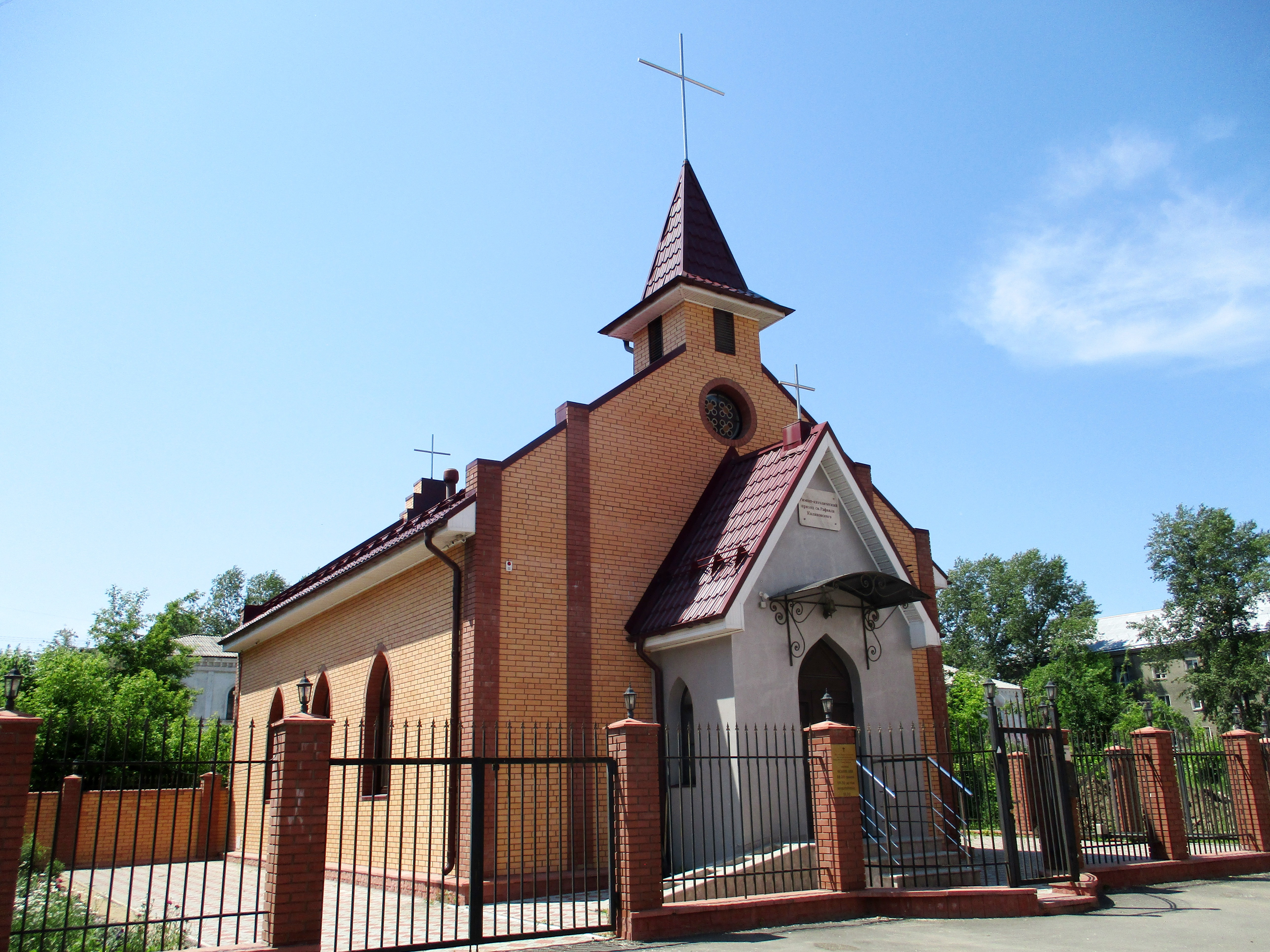
Catholic parish in Usolie-Sibirskoie

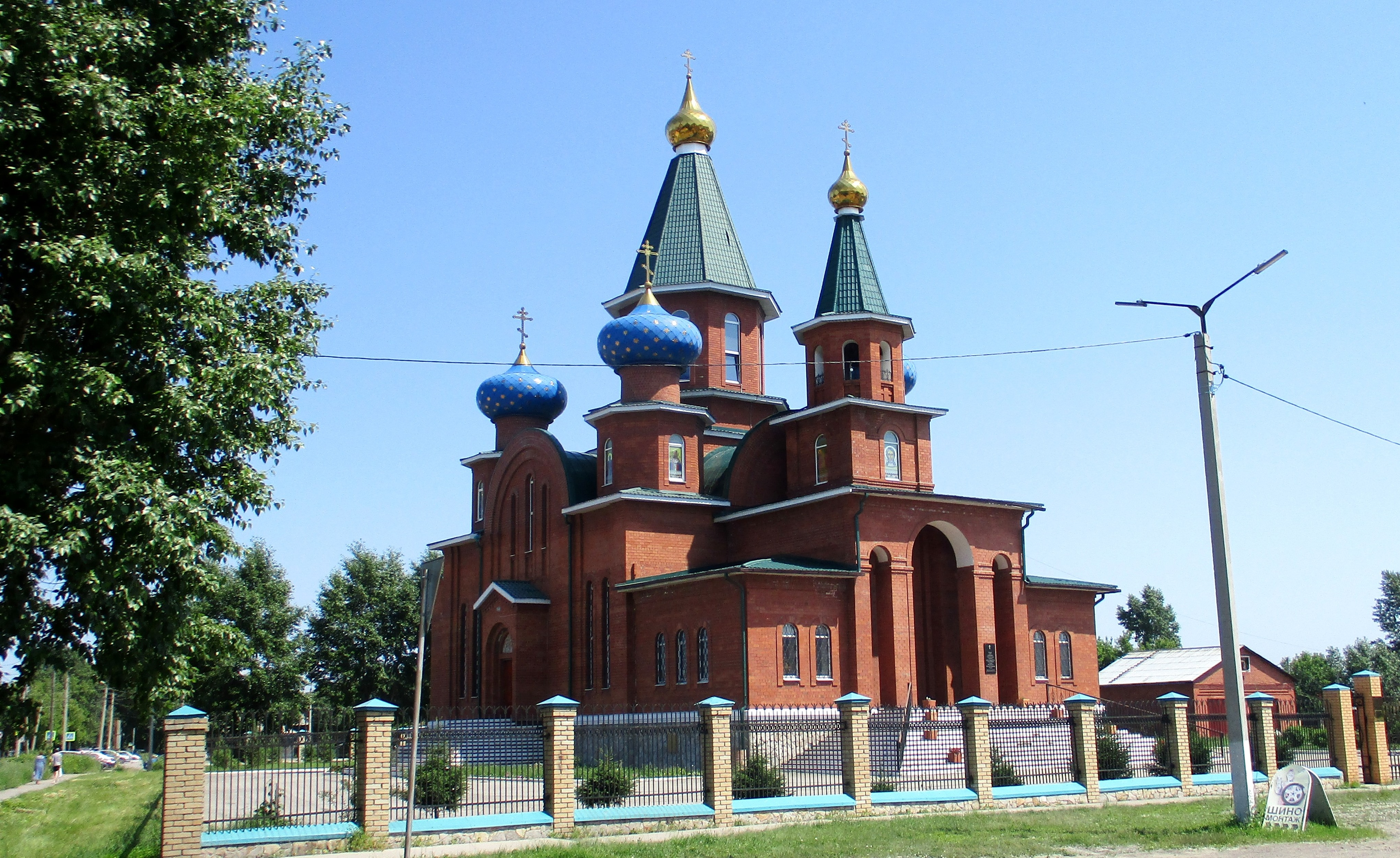
Transfiguration of the Lord Orthodox Church in Usolie-Sibirskoie
