= List of chairmen of the Legislative Assembly of Irkutsk Oblast =

The chairman of the Legislative Assembly of Irkutsk Oblast is the presiding officer of that legislature.

== Office-holders ==
Name	Took office	Left office
Ivan Zelenta	1994	2000
Viktor Borovsky	2000	2002
Sergey Shishkin	2002	2004
Viktor Kruglov	2004	2008
Ludmila Berlina	October 26, 2008	April 20, 2015
Sergey Brilka	May 20, 2015	September 19, 2018
Sergey Sokol	September 19, 2018	March 17, 2020
Aleksandr Vedrenikov	March 17, 2020	present

== Sources ==
- The Legislative Assembly of Irkutsk OblastReferences
