= Zima (town) =

Town in Irkutsk Oblast, Russia

Zima Зима
- Town
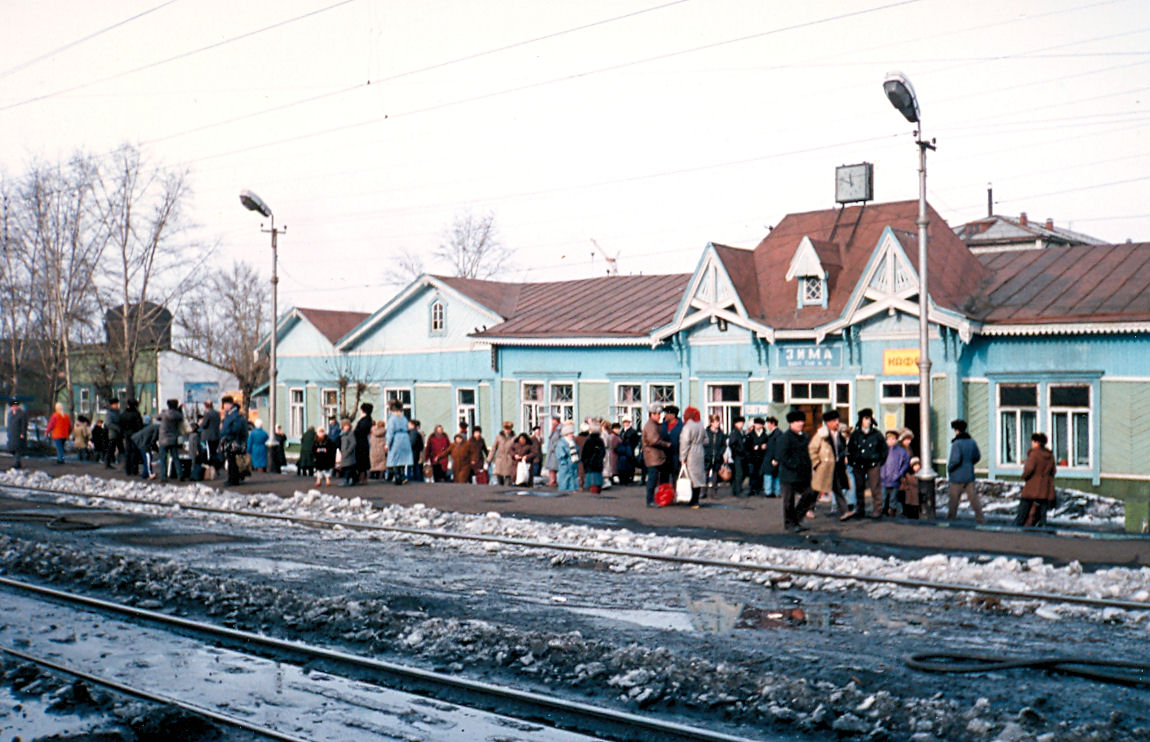
- Train station at Zima

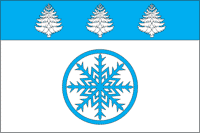
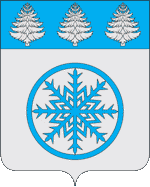
- Flag Coat of arms
- Interactive map of Zima
- Location of Zima Zima (Irkutsk Oblast)
- Coordinates: 53°55′N 102°03′E
- Country: Russia
- Federal subject: Irkutsk Oblast
- Founded: 1743
- Town status since: 1925
- Elevation: 450 m (1,480 ft)

Population (2010 Census)
  - Total: 32,508
  - Estimate (2021): 30,640 (−5.7%)

Administrative status
  - Subordinated to: Town of Zima
  - Capital of: Ziminsky District, Town of Zima

Municipal status
  - Urban okrug: Ziminskoye Urban Okrug
  - Capital of: Ziminskoye Urban Okrug, Ziminsky Municipal District
- Time zone: UTC+8 (MSK+5)
- Postal code: 665382–665393
- Dialing code: +7 39514
- OKTMO ID: 25720000001
- Website: zimadm.ru

Zima (Russian: Зима, IPA: [zʲɪˈma], lit. 'Winter'; Buryat: Зэмэ, Zeme) is a town in Irkutsk Oblast, Russia, located at the point where the Trans-Siberian Railway crosses the Oka River. Population: 32,508 (2010 census); 34,899 (2002 census); 41,814 (1989 Soviet census).

== Geography ==
The town is situated on a low-lying plain, heavily water-logged. The Zima River joins the Oka in the town's vicinity.

=== Climate ===
The local climate is extremely continental; air temperature varies between −45 °C (−49 °F) in winter to 40 °C (104 °F) in summer.

== History ==
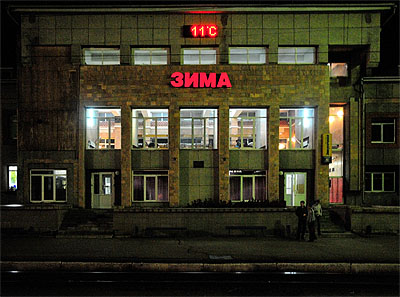
Zima railway station

The village of Staraya Zima (Ста́рая Зима́) on the present site of the town was established in 1743. In 1772, its population began to grow more quickly due to the construction of a horse-tract from Moscow which crossed the Oka River. Until the 1900s, Zima remained a roadside, mainly agricultural village.

In 1898, the Trans-Siberian railway was built through the village and a railroad station was opened. Town status was granted to Zima in 1925.

Post-war Lithuanian deportees were buried in two of the town's graveyards: that of Ukhtuy village and the town itself.

Zima's population remained at around 40,000 from the 1960s until 1990; however, after the dissolution of the Soviet Union and the associated economic crisis, the population decreased by around 15% during the 1990s.

The town is the birthplace of Yevgeny Yevtushenko, a Russian poet, the author of the biographical poem "Zima Station".

== Administrative and municipal status ==
Within the framework of administrative divisions, Zima serves as the administrative center of Ziminsky District, even though it is not a part of it. As an administrative division, it is incorporated separately as the Town of Zima—an administrative unit with the status equal to that of the districts. As a municipal division, the Town of Zima is incorporated as Ziminskoye Urban Okrug.

== Economy ==
Zima's economy relies mainly on timber production and railway-related services.

=== Transportation ===
The town has a station on the Trans-Siberian Railway, with commuter trains to Irkutsk and Tulun. The M53 Federal highway (Krasnoyarsk–Irkutsk) passes through Zima.

== Notable people ==
- Alexander Zaïd - one of the founders of the Jewish defense organizations Bar Giora and Hashomer.
