= Tulunsky District =

Tulunsky District Тулунский район (Russian)
- District
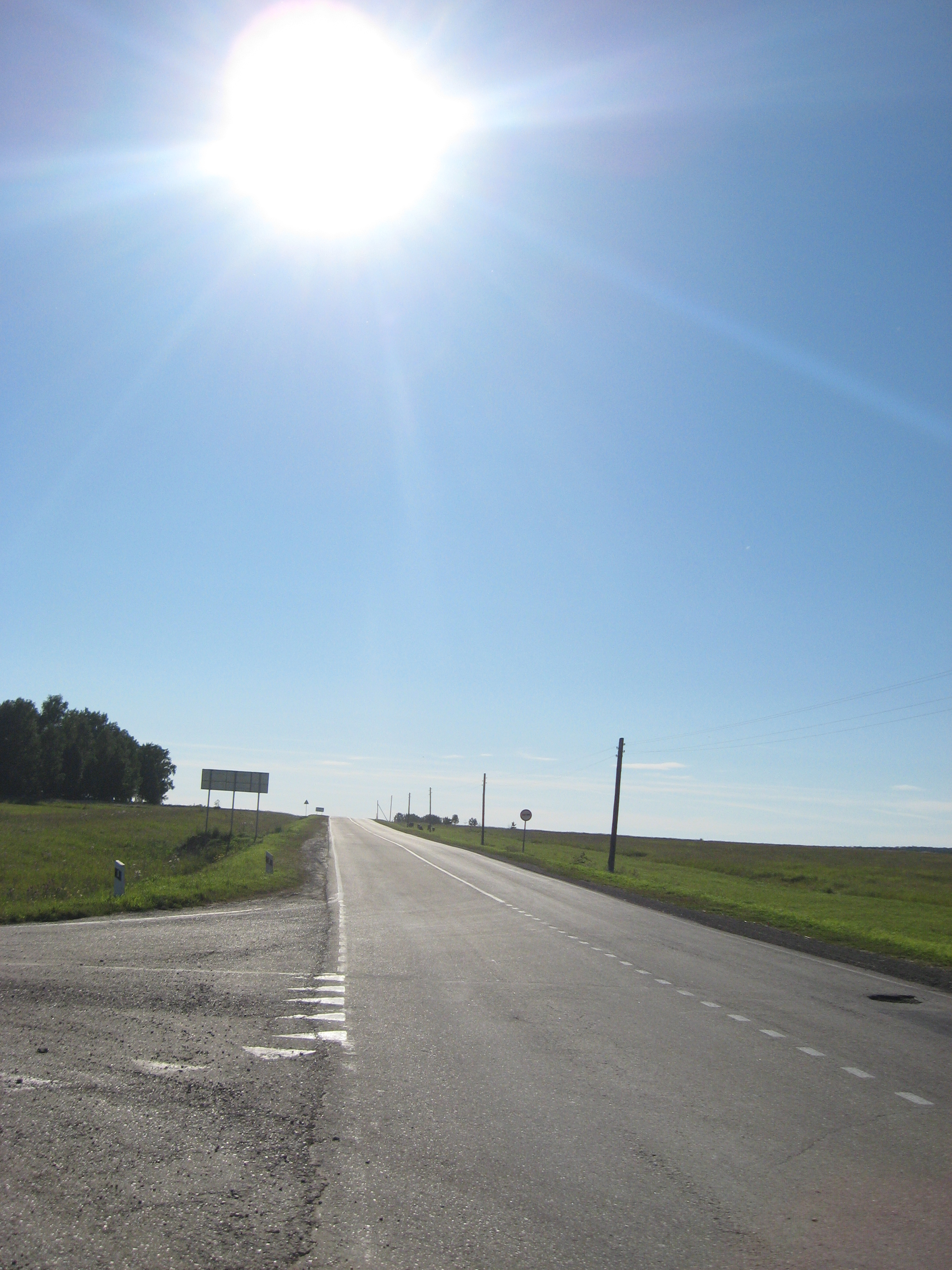
- M53 near Traktovoye, Tulunsky District

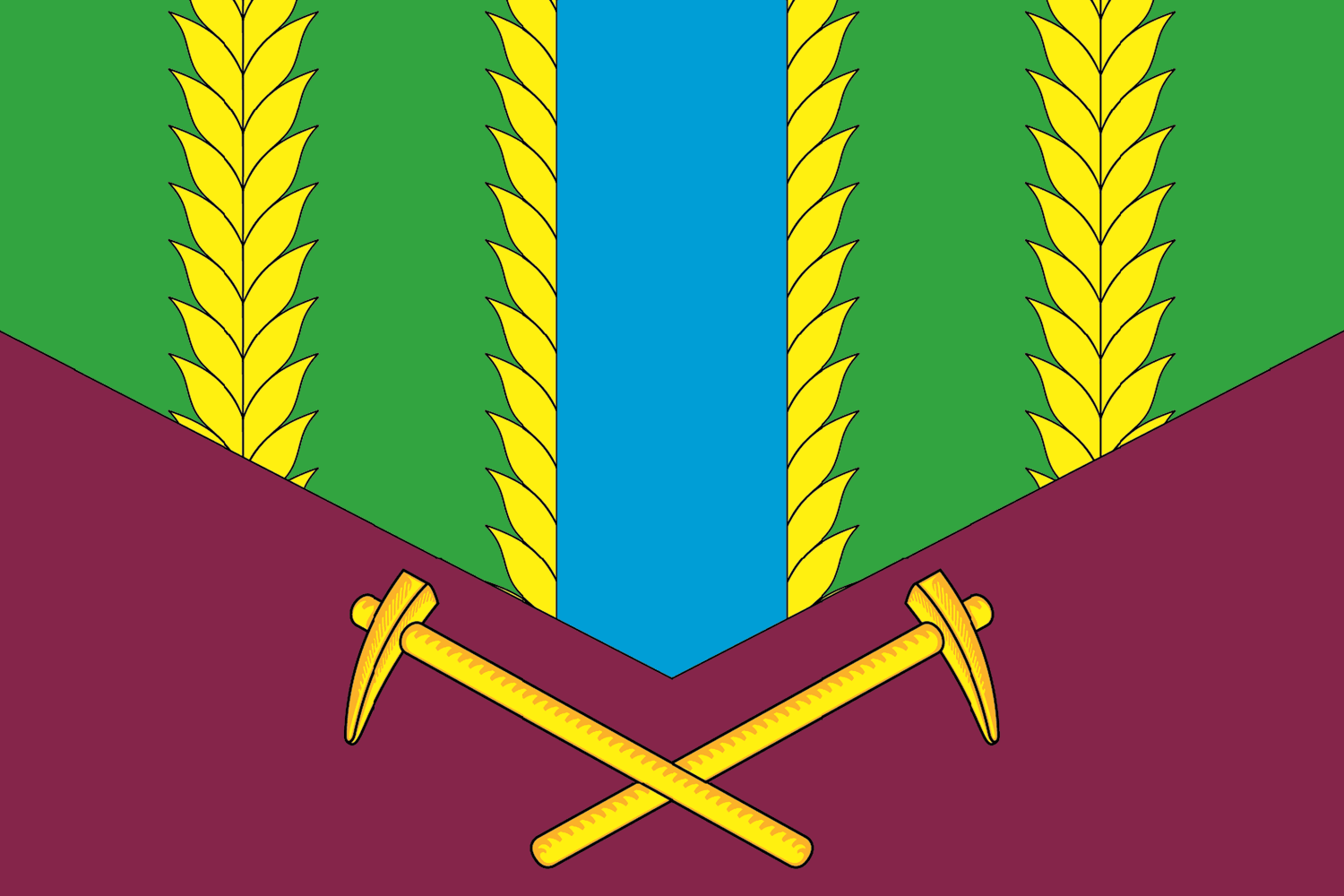
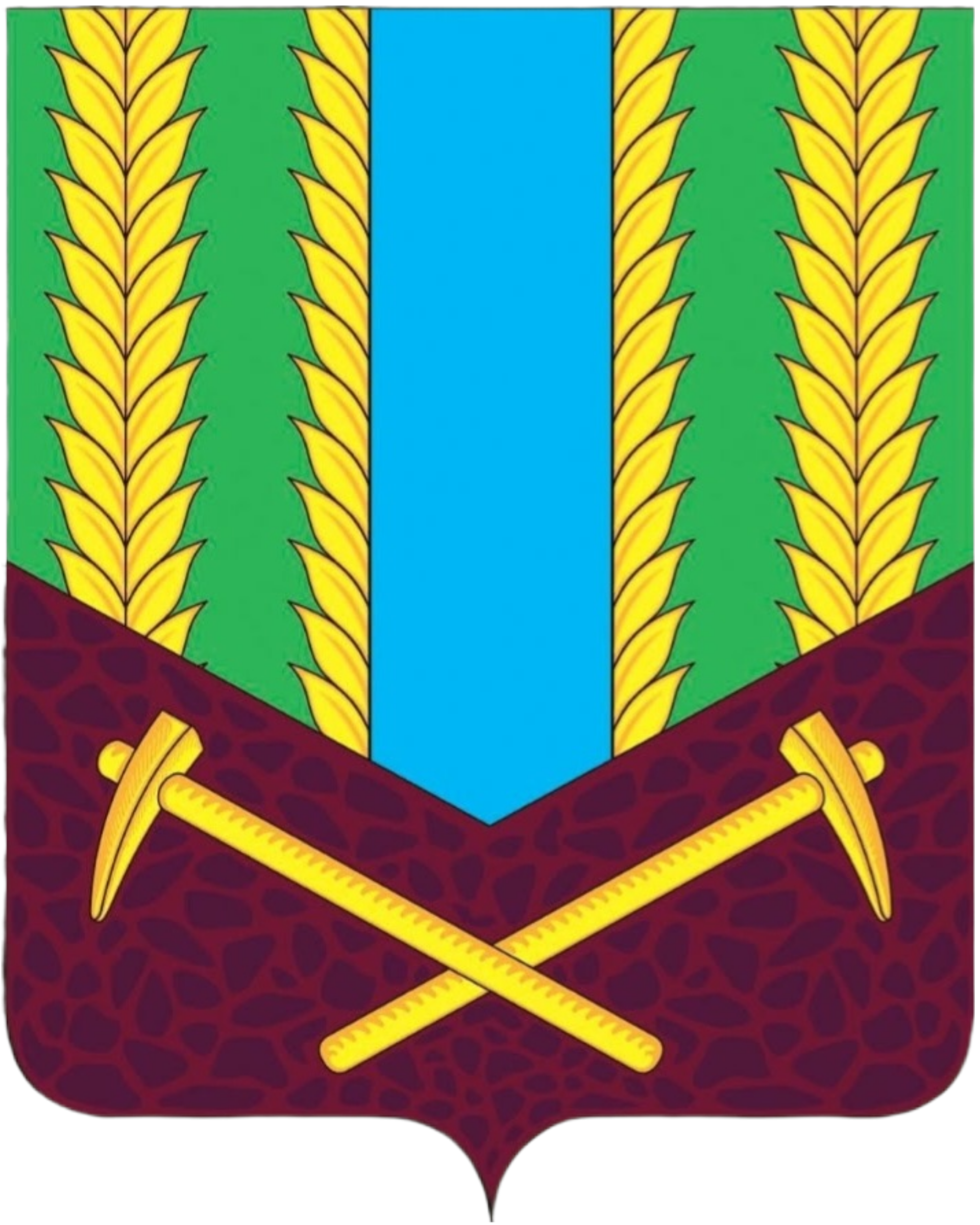
- Flag Coat of arms
- Location of Tulunsky District in Irkutsk Oblast
- Coordinates: 54°34′N 100°34′E
- Country: Russia
- Federal subject: Irkutsk Oblast
- Established: 1927
- Administrative center: Tulun

Area
  - Total: 13,561 km^{2} (5,236 sq mi)

Population (2010 Census)
  - Total: 27,285
  - Density: 2.0120/km^{2} (5.2111/sq mi)
  - Urban: 0%
  - Rural: 100%

Administrative structure
  - Inhabited localities: 86 rural localities

Municipal structure
  - Municipally incorporated as: Tulunsky Municipal District
  - Municipal divisions: 0 urban settlements, 24 rural settlements
- Time zone: UTC+8 (MSK+5)
- OKTMO ID: 25638000
- Website: http://tulunr.irkobl.ru

Tulunsky District (Russian: Тулунский райо́н) is an administrative district, one of the thirty-three in Irkutsk Oblast, Russia. Municipally, it is incorporated as Tulunsky Municipal District. The area of the district is 13,561 square kilometers (5,236 sq mi). Its administrative center is the town of Tulun (which is not administratively a part of the district). Population: 27,285 (2010 census); 29,495 (2002 Census); 32,657 (1989 Soviet census).

== Administrative and municipal status ==
Within the framework of administrative divisions, Tulunsky District is one of the thirty-three in the oblast. The town of Tulun serves as its administrative center, despite being incorporated separately as an administrative unit with the status equal to that of the districts.

As a municipal division, the district is incorporated as Tulunsky Municipal District. The Town of Tulun is incorporated separately from the district as Tulun Urban Okrug.
