= Irkutsk Oblast =

First-level administrative division of Russia

Irkutsk Oblast Иркутская область (Russian)
- Oblast
- Flag Coat of arms

- Coordinates: 57°22′N 106°00′E
- Country: Russia
- Federal district: Siberian
- Economic region: East Siberian
- Established: September 26, 1937
- Administrative center: Irkutsk

Government
  - Body: Legislative Assembly
  - Governor: Igor Kobzev

Area
  - Total: 774,846 km^{2} (299,170 sq mi)
  - Rank: 4th

Population (2021 census)
  - Total: 2,370,102
  - Estimate (2018): 2,404,195
  - Rank: 20th
  - Density: 3.05880/km^{2} (7.92227/sq mi)
  - Urban: 77.6%
  - Rural: 22.4%

GDP (nominal, 2024)
  - Total: ₽2.54 trillion (US$29.79 billion)
  - Per capita: ₽1.09 million (US$12,747.94)
- Time zone: UTC+8 (MSK+5)
- ISO 3166 code: RU-IRK
- License plates: 38, 85, 138
- OKTMO ID: 25000000
- Official languages: Russian
- Website: http://www.irkobl.ru

Irkutsk Oblast (Note: Russian: Ирку́тская о́бласть, romanized: Irkutskaya oblastʹ; Buryat: Эрхүү можо, romanized: Erhüü možo) is a federal subject of Russia (an oblast), located in southeastern Siberia in the basins of the Angara, Lena, and Nizhnyaya Tunguska Rivers. The administrative center is the city of Irkutsk. It had a population of 2,370,102 at the 2021 Census.

== Geography ==
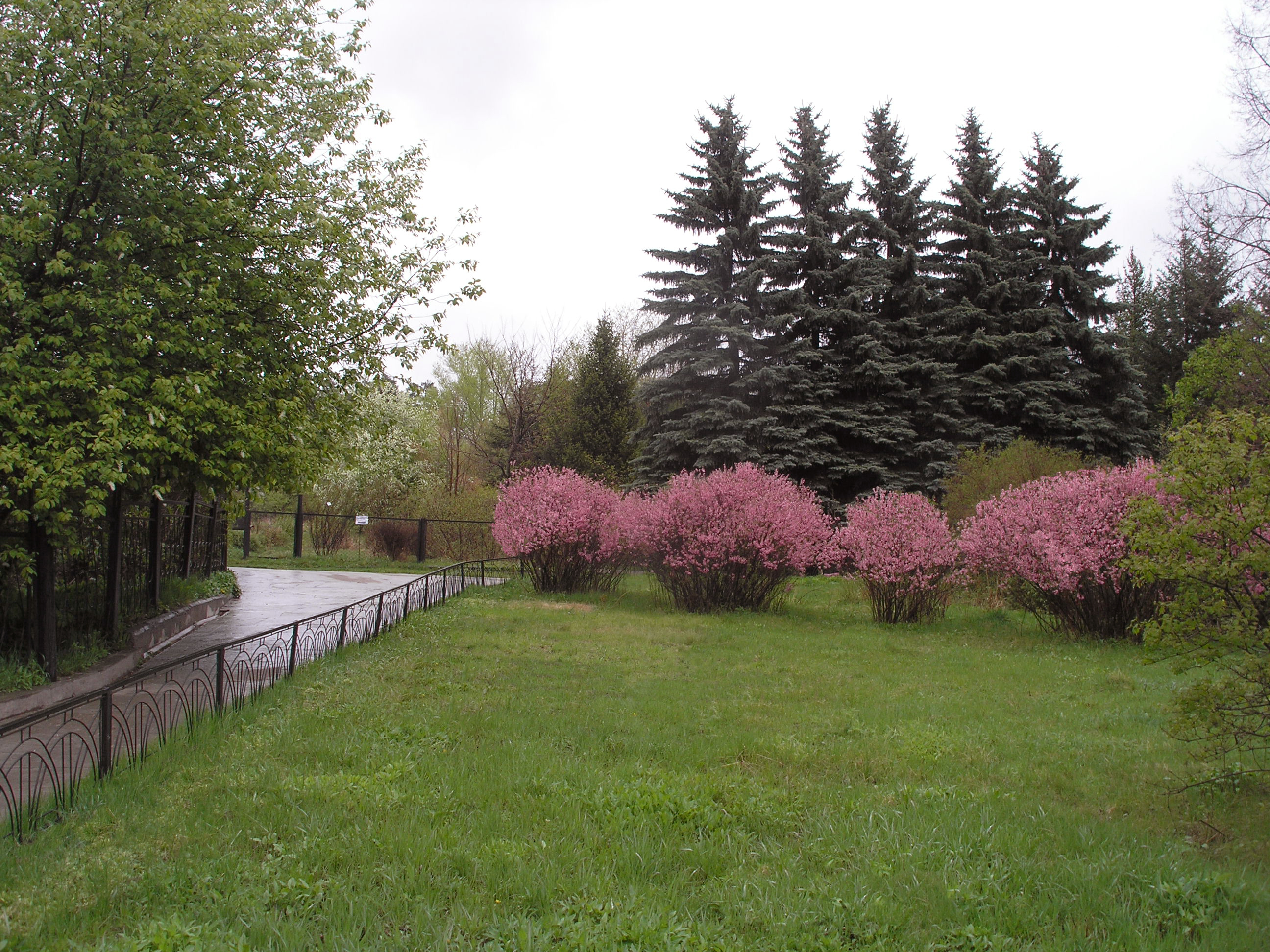
Spring at the Irkutsk Botanic Garden. The pink blooming bushes in the middle are a relic plant, Prunus pedunculata. Picea pungens trees are in the backdrop.

Irkutsk Oblast borders the Republic of Buryatia and the Tuva Republic in the south and southwest, which separate it from Khövsgöl Province, Mongolia; Krasnoyarsk Krai in the west; the Sakha Republic in the northeast; and Zabaykalsky Krai in the east.

Lake Baikal, the oldest and deepest lake in the world (containing over a fifth of Earth's fresh liquid surface water), is located in the southeast of the region. It is drained by the Angara, which flows north across the province; the outflow rate is controlled by the Irkutsk Dam. The two other major dams on the Irkutsk Oblast's section of the Angara are at Bratsk and Ust-Ilimsk; both forming large reservoirs. The Lena has its source in Irkutsk Oblast as well, and flows north-east into the neighboring Sakha Republic.

Irkutsk Oblast consists mostly of the hills and broad valleys of the Central Siberian Plateau, with the Lena-Angara Plateau. The Primorsky Range and the Baikal Mountains stretch along Lake Baikal, and in the northeast rise the North Baikal Highlands and the Patom Plateau. Pik Tofalariya is the highest point of the oblast.

=== Climate ===
The climate varies from warm summer continental in the south to continental-subarctic in the northern part (Köppen climate classification: Dwc). For almost half the year, from mid-October until the beginning of April, the average temperature is below 0 °C (32 °F). Winters are very cold, with average high temperatures in Irkutsk of −14.9 °C (5.2 °F) and average lows of −25.3 °C (−13.5 °F) in January. Summers are warm but short: the average high in July is +24.5 °C (76.1 °F) and the average low is +11.2 °C (52.2 °F). However, by September, the weather cools down significantly to an average daily high of +15.3 °C (59.5 °F) and an average daily low of +2.5 °C (36.5 °F). More than half of all precipitation falls in the summer months, with the wettest month being July, with 96.2 millimeters (3.79 in) of rain. January is the driest month, with only 11 millimeters (0.43 in) of precipitation. Annual precipitation averages 419.8 millimeters (16.53 in).

== History ==
=== Pre-history ===
Mongolic-related Slab Grave cultural monuments survive in Baikal territory. The territory of Buryatia came under the control of the Xiongnu Empire (209 BC – 93 CE), of the Mongolian Xianbei state (93–234), of the Rouran Khaganate (330–555), of the Göktürk Khaganate (555–603), of the Eastern Turkic Khaganate (603–744), of the Uyghur Khaganate (744–847), of the Yenisei Kyrgyz (847–1219), of the Mongol Empire (1206–1368) and of the Northern Yuan (1368–1691). Medieval Mongol tribes like the Merkit, Bayads, Barga Mongols and Tümeds inhabited Buryatia. Today Buryat-Mongols remain in the territory of the oblast.

Russian presence in the area dates from the 17th century: the Russian Tsardom expanded eastward following the conquest of the Khanate of Sibir in 1582. By the end of the 17th century, Irkutsk had become a small town, monasteries were being built, and suburbs and agricultural settlements had started to form.

=== 18th century ===
From the 18th century trades and crafts began to develop, and gold- and silver-smiths appeared. As the Russian state expanded to the east of Irkutsk, the city became the capital of enormous territories from the Yenisey River to the Pacific Ocean, and played an important role in the exploration and securing of vast Eastern-Siberian and Far-Eastern territories for Russia. Gradually, Irkutsk gained more importance as the main transportation- and trade-center of Eastern Siberia; it became a center of trade routes from Kamchatka, Chukotka, Yakutia to Mongolia, and China. The administrative importance of the city also increased, and it became a center of a fifth of the provinces of Siberia; in 1764 it became the center of an independent province, the Irkutsk Governorate.

For Irkutsk the 18th century was a time of research expeditions. Some of the organization of Vitus Bering's first (1725–1730) and second (1733–1743) expeditions to the shores of Kamchatka took place in Irkutsk.

A merchant class developed in the city of Irkutsk. In the second half of the eighteenth century, the Irkutsk industrial and merchant companies of Golikov, Trapeznikov, Ivan Stepanovich Bechevin, Nikolai Prokofevich Mylnikov, Sibirakovy began to explore the Aleutian Islands and later Alaska. In 1799 the merchant companies came together in a Russian-American Company "for the trades on the territory of the Aleutian and Kuril islands and the rest of the North-Eastern sea, belonging to Russia by the right of discovery". Grigorii Ivanovich Shelikhov, an outstanding seafarer, played an important role in controlling enormous spaces of the northern part of the Pacific Ocean. He founded the first colonies of Russian America through the Shelikhov-Golikov Company. In 1727 the Russian Orthodox Church established the Irkutsk Eparchy.

During the 18th century, schools, professional-technical education colleges, science museums, libraries, theaters, and book-printers developed in Irkutsk. Educational and cultural organizations opened. In 1725 the first school in Eastern Siberia, attached to the Voznesensky monastery (founded in 1672), opened, and in 1754 sea (navigation) schools and secondary schools opened throughout the Irkutsk area. The 1780s saw the opening of the second public library in provincial towns in Russia, as well as a regional museum and an amateur theater. In Irkutsk outstanding citizens appeared, still remembered today. These included the architect, geographer and historian Anton ivanovich Losev (1765–1829), the writer Ivan Timofeevich Kalashnikov (1797–1863), and the teacher Semyon Semyonovich Schukin (1789–1863). Siberian science buildings opened. A.G. Laxman, Lomonosov's apprentice, one of the first Siberian mineralogists, worked in Irkutsk.

The city landscape of Irkutsk was changing. The Irkutsk Spassky church of 1706 (one of the oldest stone buildings in Eastern Siberia), the unique Irkutsk Krestovozdvizhenskaya church (1747), the "Prikaznaya izba" (order house), the first stone construction, and the Triumph gate were built.

=== 19th century ===
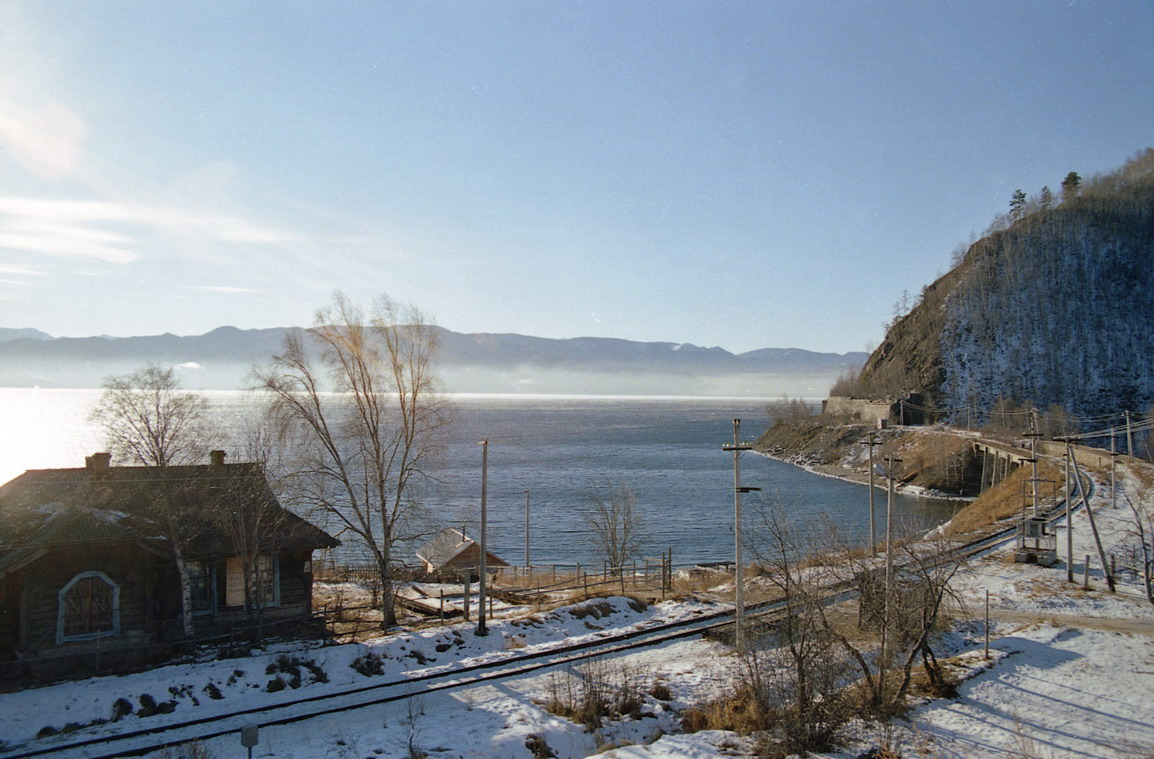
The Circum-Baikal Railway skirts the southwestern tip of Lake Baikal

In the late eighteenth century and the early nineteenth century, Irkutsk Province gradually increased in importance as a center of trade, craft, and culture. It became the center of Russian trade with China and, from the 1830s, a gold-manufacturing center of Eastern Siberia. In 1803 Irkutsk became the center of the Siberian Governorate-General, and in 1822 it became the center of the Eastern Siberian Governorate-General. The Governors-General of Eastern Siberia greatly influenced the development of the city.

Irkutsk merchants explored the Yeniseysky and Leno-Vitimsky gold regions and substantially increased their capital, which made them the richest merchants in Siberia. The Irkutsk merchant class began to play a major role in the city's development. Intensive city construction took place. Private residences, hospitals, orphanages, and schools were built, while significant funds went towards education and the development of science in the region.

The architecture of the city of Irkutsk underwent change. The Irkutsk White House, done in Russian classic style in 1800–1804, and the Moscow Triumphal Gates of Irkutsk – a monument of the nineteenth century, were built in honor of the tenth anniversary of Alexander I's reign.

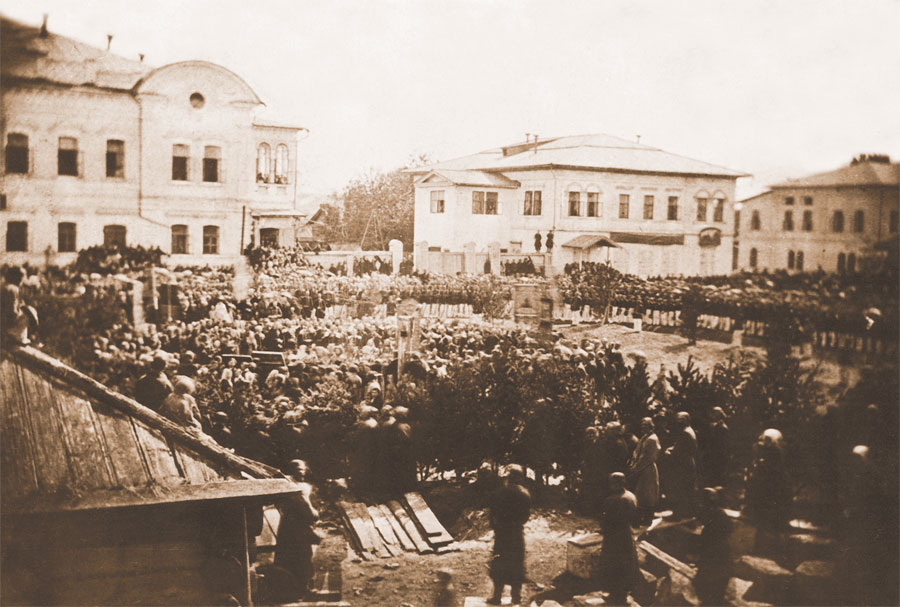
1866 ground-breaking ceremony for the Chapel of Christ the Savior in Irkutsk

In the second half of the nineteenth century the printing art developed in Irkutsk, the first newspapers being, “Irkutsk province news” and “Amur”. The names of A.P.Schapov, M.B.Zagoskin, V.I.Vagin were connected with the newspaper “Siberia”. In 1851, the first scientific organization in Eastern Siberia – the Siberian branch of Russian geographical society, was opened. In 1877, it was called the Eastern-Siberian branch. V.I.Dybovskii, A.L.Chekanovskii, I.D.Cherskii, V.A.Obruchev, geologists, geographers and researchers of Siberia, worked in Irkutsk Oblast on exploring Lake Baikal and the Lena River.

The summer of 1879 could be considered to be a dramatic period in the city of Irkutsk's history. During a July 22–24 fire almost all the central parts of the city were burnt, and more than two thirds of city buildings and 75 city districts were destroyed. The city began to revive, getting a new look. Stone and wooden constructions built after the fire have been preserved up to the present day. In 1898 the arrival of the first train via the Trans-Siberian Railway to Irkutsk Oblast was a major event. The construction of the Trans-Siberian Railway contributed to further city development.

Several politically exiled figures were connected with Irkutsk city. Among the first of the exiled was A.N. Radischev, who lived in Irkutsk for more than 3 months. Since the 1830s, the Decembrists lived in settlements and in colonies in the Irkutsk Oblast. The exiled houses of Volkonsky and Trubetskoy later became house-museums. N. A. Panov, I. V. Podzhio, A. Z. Muravyov, P. A. Mukhanov, A. P. Yushnevsky, V. A. Bechasnov, the wife of Trubetskoy and their children stayed in Irkutsk for the rest of their lives. In the late 1850s, the Petrashevtzy appeared in Irkutsk. The exiled historian-democrat, A.P. Schapov, lived here until his last days, and the Polish rebels and revolutionaries (including the narodnik) also lived here.

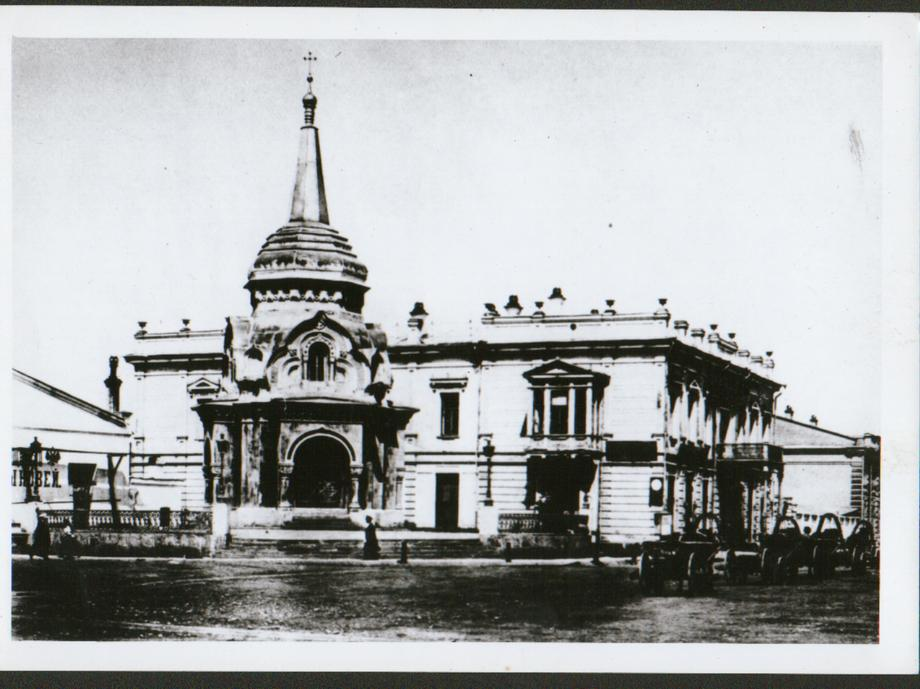
Chapel of the Savior and Medvednikovsky Bank, 1897

A well-known Russian publicist of the nineteenth century, N. Shelgunov, wrote about Irkutsk: “Irkutsk is the only Siberian city, which has the city character. ...As England created London, France - Paris, Siberia – created Irkutsk. Siberia is proud of Irkutsk, “not to see this city” means “not to see Siberia”.

In the early nineteenth century the city was considerably changed, especially its center. Large buildings were being built, mason streets were being made, cab drivers and street lights appeared. The water supply and the first electrification stations were built. The Irkutsk Regional museum was stamped with the names of Siberian researchers on its walls (1883), the building of the first public community, city theater (1897), Kazan' cathedral, made in new Byzantine style (1893), and the Roman Catholic cathedral (1895) completed an architectural style of the city. In 1908 a monument to Alexander III was opened on the Angara embankment.

=== 20th century ===
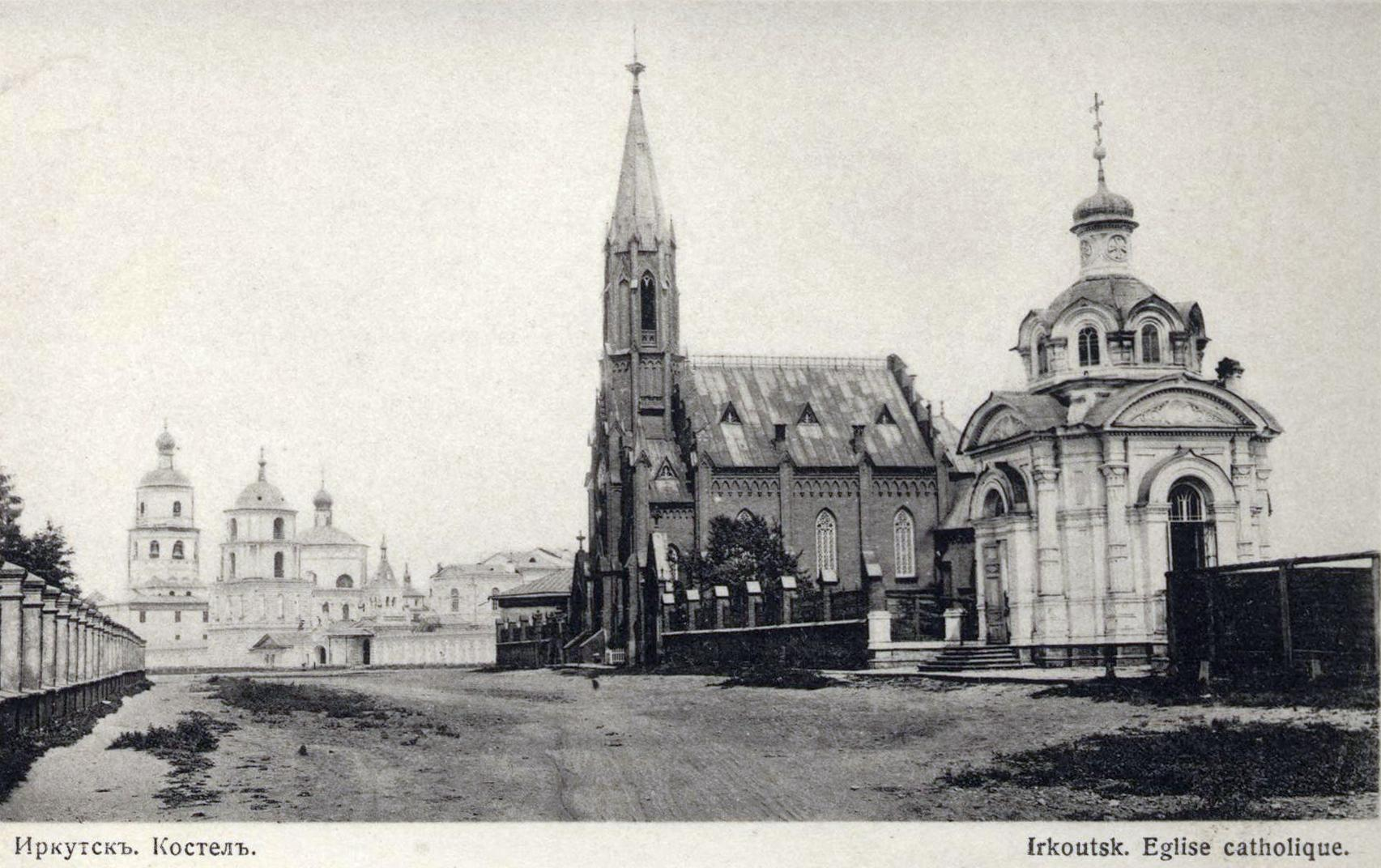
Irkutsk. Chapel of St. Innocent, c. 1910

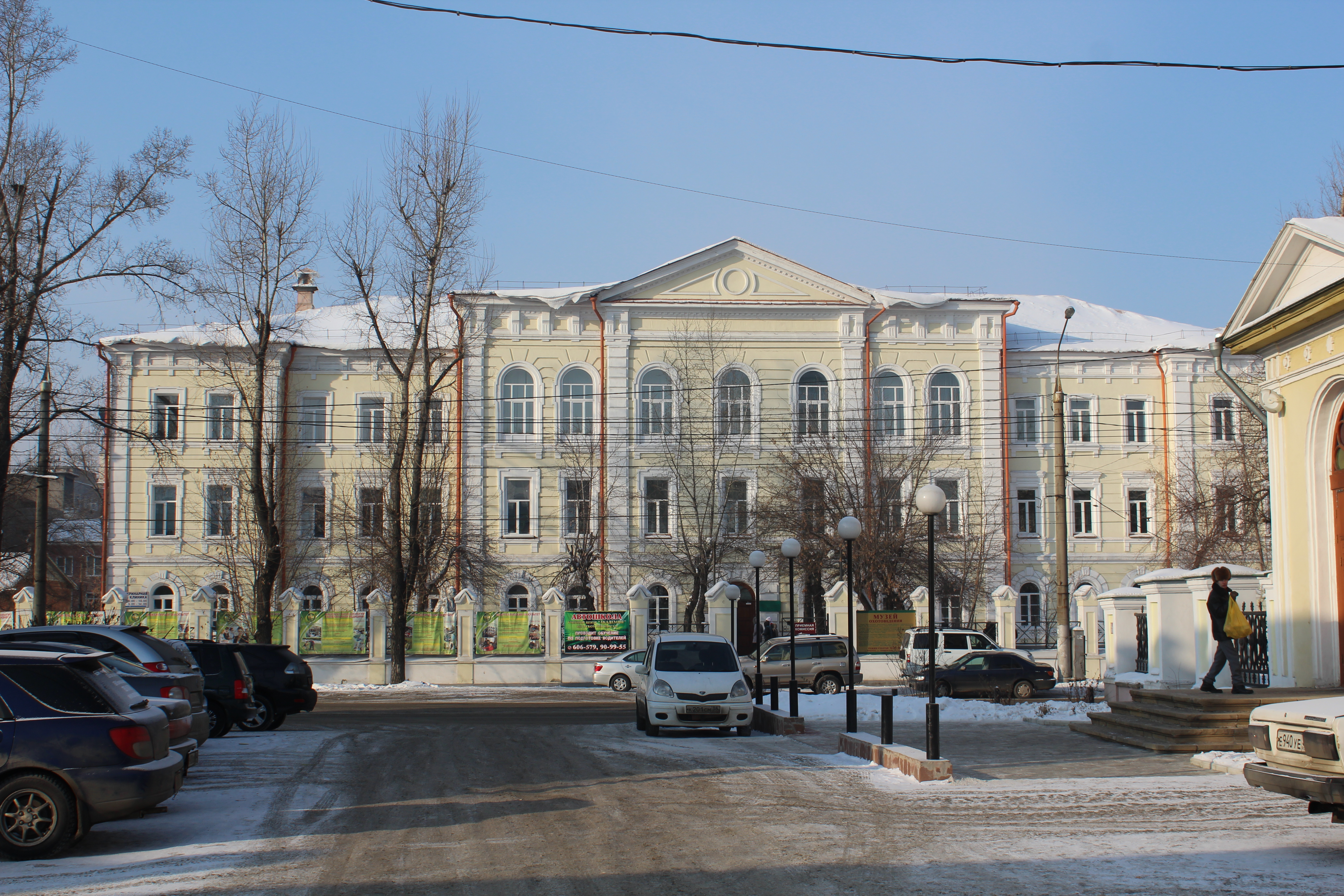
The orphanage of E. Medvednikova is the first women's educational institution in Siberia. Irkutsk, Timiryazeva street, 59

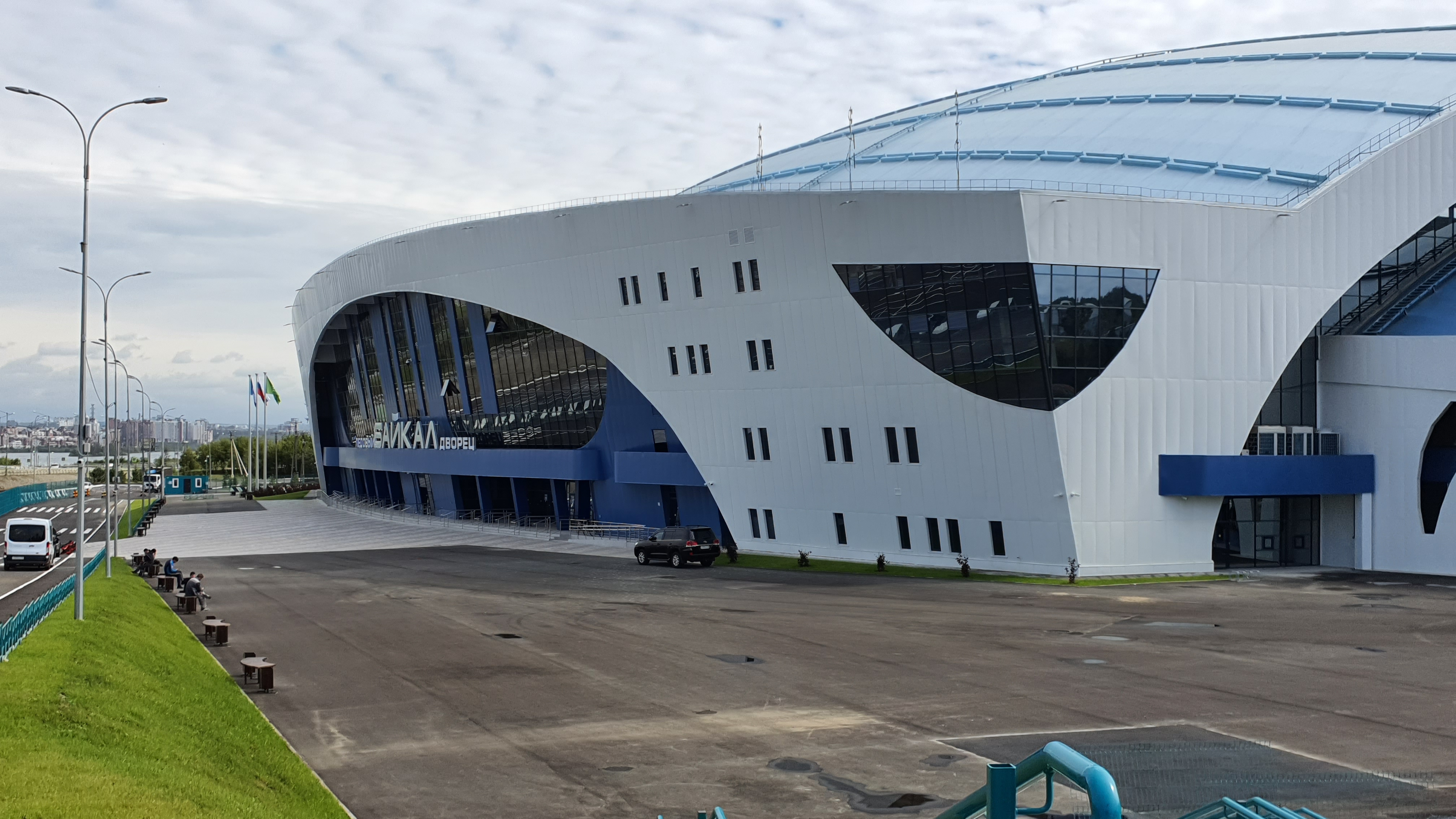
Ice hockey arena in Irkutsk

The city was damaged and influenced by the political events of the twentieth century – the Russian revolution, the 1917 October Revolution, the Civil war and the Great Patriotic War.

Since the 1930s the industrial construction of the city had begun. Mechanical engineering plants, the air plant, brick and concrete plants, tea fabric, and food industry plants were being built. Economic development of the city contributed to scientific, educational and cultural development. The first Higher education in Eastern Siberia, Irkutsk State University was founded in 1918. Its departments were developing as independent institutes: medical, pedagogical, finance-economical. In 1930 the metallurgic institute was opened, in 1934 the agricultural institute was organized.

The early Soviets educated women in traditional professions like nursing and primary education. At right is the Irkutsk orphanage named for E. Medvednikova, which served both as an eleemosynary institution and educational facility.

Since the 1950s a rapid development of the city of Irkutsk took place. In 1947 streetcar routes were opened in the city and trolleybus routes were opened in 1972. In 1958 a TV center was established. The city's larger districts and micro regions construction period began. New districts such as Baykalsky, Solnechny, Yubileyny, Primorsky, Akademgorodok and others were created.

== Politics ==
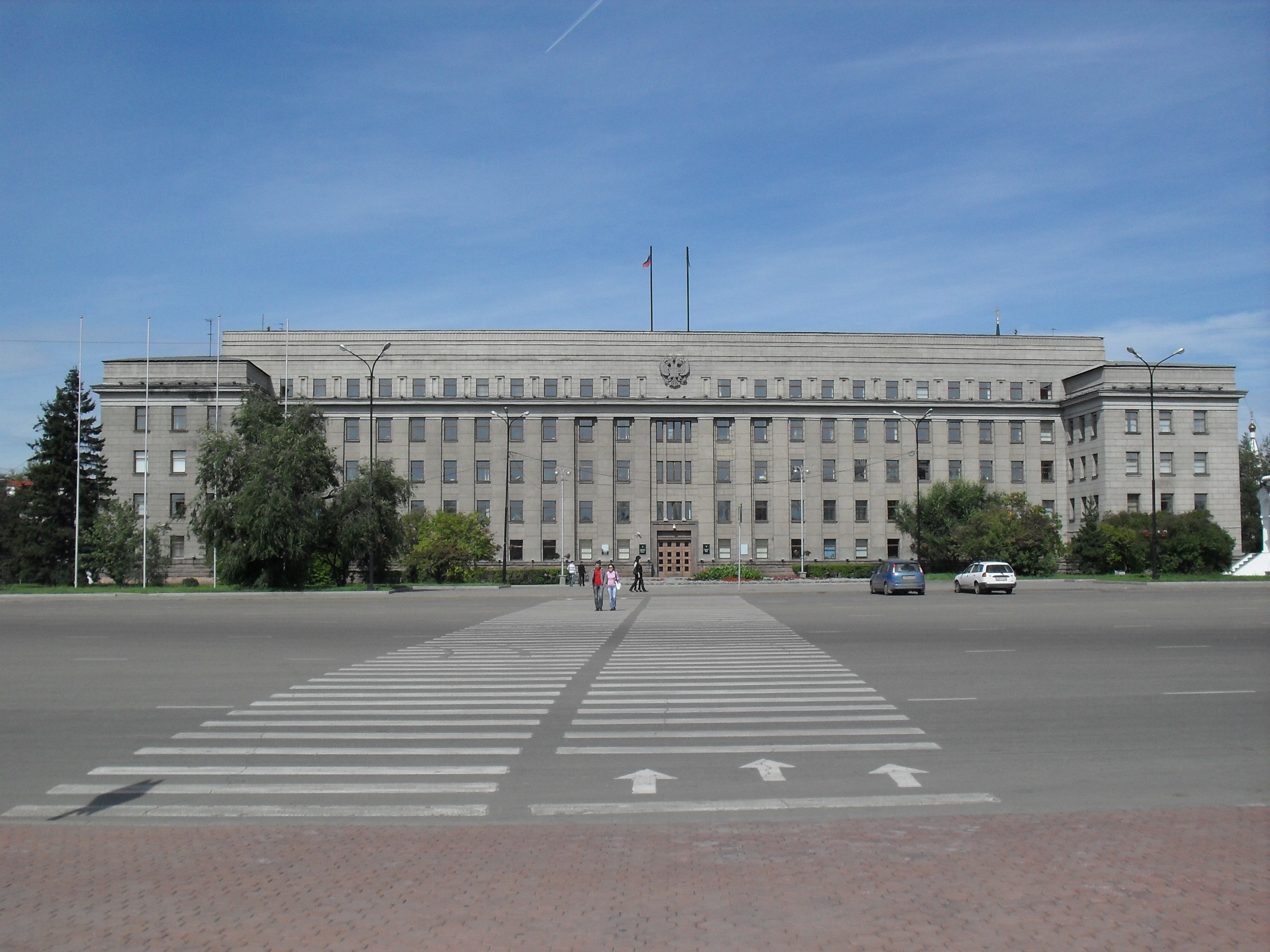
Building of the Government of Irkutsk Oblast

=== Soviet era ===
During the Soviet period, the high authority in the oblast was shared between three persons: The first secretary of the Irkutsk CPSU Committee (who in reality had the biggest authority), the chairman of the oblast Soviet (legislative power), and the chairman of the oblast Executive Committee (executive power). After the abolition of Article 6 of the Constitution of the USSR in March 1990, the CPSU lost its monopoly on power. The head of the Oblast administration, and eventually the governor was appointed/elected alongside elected regional parliament.

=== Russian Federation ===
The Charter of Irkutsk Oblast is the fundamental law of the region. The Legislative Assembly of Irkutsk Oblast is the province's standing legislative (representative) body. The Legislative Assembly exercises its authority by passing laws, resolutions, and other legal acts and by supervising the implementation and observance of the laws and other legal acts passed by it. The highest executive body is the Oblast Government, which includes territorial executive bodies such as district administrations, committees, and commissions that facilitate development and run the day to day matters of the province. The Oblast administration supports the activities of the Governor who is the highest official and acts as guarantor of the observance of the oblast Charter in accordance with the Constitution of Russia.

== Demographics ==
The oblast is very thinly populated, with a population density of 3 people per square kilometer, compared to a national average of 8.4. Irkutsk is the administrative center and largest city, with 612,973 residents. Other large cities are Bratsk (238,825 people), Angarsk (229,592 people), Ust-Ilimsk (83,635 people), and Usolye-Sibirskoye (80,331 people).

Most of the population are ethnic Russians. A minority group, the Buryats, have a special Ust-Orda Buryat Okrug inside the oblast. Russians and other Slavic/Germanic groups make up 92.9% of the population, according to the 2021 Census, while Buryats are 3.6%. Tofalars number 659, a decrease from 722 in 1989.

Ethnic group	Population	Percentage
Russians	1,917,265	92.2%
Buryats	74,746	3.6%
Tatars	12,130	0.6%
Ukrainians	9,506	0.5%
Other	65,640	3.2%

One small ethnic group, concentrated in three villages (Pikhtinsk, Sredne-Pikhtinsk, and Dagnik) in Zalarinsky District is the so-called "Bug Hollanders": descendants of Polish-speaking Lutheran farmers who had moved to Siberia from the then Russian Volhynia in 1911–1912 in search of affordable land. Although they had long lost German (or Dutch) language of their ancestors (even in the early twentieth century they spoke Ukrainian and read Polish), they were still considered ethnic Germans, and during World War II were usually drafted for work in labor camps, instead of front-line military service.

=== Religion ===
Religion in Irkutsk Oblast as of 2012 (Sreda Arena Atlas)
Russian Orthodoxy	28.1%
Other Orthodox	5.7%
Other Christians	6.7%
Islam	1.2%
Rodnovery and other native faiths	2.2%
Spiritual but not religious	37.2%
Atheism and irreligion	17.5%
Other and undeclared	1.4%

According to a 2012 survey 28.1% of the population of Irkutsk Oblast adheres to the Russian Orthodox Church, 7% are unaffiliated generic Christians, 6% are Orthodox Christian believers without belonging to any church or are members of other (non-Russian) Orthodox churches, 2% of the population adheres to the Slavic native faith (Rodnovery), and 1% to Islam. In addition, 37% of the population declares to be "spiritual but not religious", 17% is atheist, and 1.9% follows other religions or did not give an answer to the question.

=== Population ===
Historical population
Year	Pop.	±%
1897	514,267	—
1959	1,976,453	+284.3%
1970	2,313,410	+17.0%
1979	2,559,522	+10.6%
1989	2,830,641	+10.6%
2002	2,581,705	−8.8%
2010	2,428,750	−5.9%
2021	2,370,102	−2.4%
2025	2,316,571	−2.3%
Source: Census data, estimate

Irkutsk Oblast registered natural population growth in 2008, the first time after 1993. Still, the future prospects for population growth in Irkutsk seems bleak. In 2007, women in Irkutsk were having an average of 1.602 children each. Fertility rate was extremely low in urban areas, where women were having just 1.477 children each. In rural areas however, the fertility rate was slightly above replaceable levels. In rural areas of Irkutsk Oblast, women were having an average of 2.165 children each. (Figures are not available for 2008, although for Russia as a whole fertility rates for 2008 were approx. 6% higher than that in 2007, and for Irkutsk 9% higher).

Vital statistics for 2024:

- Births: 22,304 (9.6 per 1,000)
- Deaths: 32,158 (13.8 per 1,000)

Total fertility rate (2024):
1.62 children per woman

Life expectancy (2021):
Total — 66.80 years (male — 61.90, female — 71.69)

District in 2007	Type	Birth Rate	Death Rate	NGR
Irkutsk Oblast	Obl	13.8	14.0	-0.02%
Bratsk	Urb=	11.8	13.0	−0.12%
Zima	Urb=	17.4	17.2	0.02%
Irkutsk	Urb=	13.5	12.6	0.09%
Sayansk	Urb=	12.9	11.8	0.11%
Svirsk	Urb=	14.3	21.7	−0.74%
Tulun	Urb=	13.9	15.3	−0.14%
Usolye-Sibirskoye	Urb=	13.1	16.3	−0.32%
Ust-Ilimsk	Urb=	10.5	9.4	0.11%
Cheremkhovo	Urb=	15.1	20.6	−0.55%
Angarsky	Rur=	11.0	13.5	−0.25%
Balagansky	Rur=	15.9	14.1	0.18%
Bodaybinsky	Rur=	13.6	13.9	−0.03%
Bratsky	Rur=	13.5	14.7	−0.12%
Zhigalovsky	Rur=	18.8	16.7	0.21%
Zalarinsky	Rur=	16.0	15.9	0.01%
Ziminsky	Rur=	14.7	16.4	−0.17%
Irkutsky	Rur=	16.1	13.1	0.30%
Kazachinsko-Lensky	Rur=	15.3	11.8	0.35%
Katangsky	Rur=	12.8	14.6	−0.18%
Kachugsky	Rur=	17.3	15.4	0.19%
Kirensky	Rur=	13.6	14.7	−0.11%
Kuytunsky	Rur=	16.0	17.0	−0.10%
Mamsko-Chuysky	Rur=	9.9	19.3	−0.94%
Nizhneilimsky	Rur=	14.3	15.0	−0.07%
Nizhneudinsky	Rur=	14.2	19.9	−0.57%
Olkhonsky	Rur=	18.6	13.0	0.56%
Slyudyansky	Rur=	16.4	15.6	0.08%
Tayshetsky	Rur=	13.6	16.4	−0.28%
Tulunsky	Rur=	15.8	15.9	−0.01%
Usolsky	Rur=	14.1	14.0	0.01%
Ust-Ilimsky	Rur=	14.4	12.3	0.21%
Ust-Kutsky	Rur=	16.5	14.5	0.20%
Ust-Udinsky	Rur=	19.0	15.4	0.36%
Cheremkhovsky	Rur=	18.1	16.1	0.20%
Chunsky	Rur=	14.4	16.4	−0.20%
Shelekhovsky	Rur=	13.7	12.3	0.14%
Alarsky	OAO=	15.5	11.7	0.38%
Bayandayevsky	OAO=	18.2	14.0	0.42%
Bokhansky	OAO=	16.1	12.9	0.32%
Nukutsky	OAO=	21.2	12.6	0.86%
Osinsky	OAO=	17.9	12.3	0.56%
Ekhirit-Bulagatsky	OAO=	20.8	11.5	0.93%

== See also ==
- Music of Irkutsk
- List of Chairmen of the Legislative Assembly of Irkutsk Oblast
