= Usolsky District =

Location of Irkutsk Oblast in Russia

Location of Perm Krai in Russia

Usolsky District is the name of several administrative and municipal districts in Russia:

- Usolsky District, Irkutsk Oblast, an administrative and municipal district of Irkutsk Oblast
- Usolsky District, Perm Krai, an administrative and municipal district of Perm Krai

== See also ==
- Usolye
