= Svirsk =

Town in Irkutsk Oblast, Russia

Svirsk Свирск
- Town
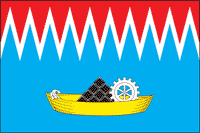
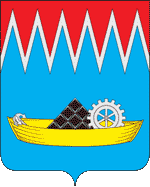
- Flag Coat of arms
- Interactive map of Svirsk
- Location of Svirsk Svirsk (Irkutsk Oblast)
- Coordinates: 53°05′N 103°20′E
- Country: Russia
- Federal subject: Irkutsk Oblast
- Founded: 1735
- Town status since: 1949
- Elevation: 410 m (1,350 ft)

Population (2010 Census)
  - Total: 13,650
  - Estimate (2021): 15,485 (+13.4%)

Administrative status
  - Subordinated to: Town of Svirsk
  - Capital of: Town of Svirsk

Municipal status
  - Urban okrug: Svirsk Urban Okrug
  - Capital of: Svirsk Urban Okrug
- Time zone: UTC+8 (MSK+5)
- Postal code: 665420
- OKTMO ID: 25746000001
- Website: www.svirsk.net

Svirsk (Russian: Свирск) is a town in Irkutsk Oblast, Russia, located on the left bank of the Angara River 150 kilometers (93 mi) northwest of Irkutsk. Population: 13,650 (2010 census); 15,500 (2002 census); 19,214 (1989 Soviet census); 21,000 (1974).

== History ==
Svirsk was granted town status in 1949.

== Administrative and municipal status ==
Within the framework of administrative divisions, it is incorporated as the Town of Svirsk—an administrative unit with the status equal to that of the districts. As a municipal division, the Town of Svirsk is incorporated as Svirsk Urban Okrug.

== Sport ==
Nikita Tyukhay from Svirsk is training Chinese boys and girls in bandy as well as China national bandy team.
