= Ziminsky District =

Ziminsky District Зиминский район
- District
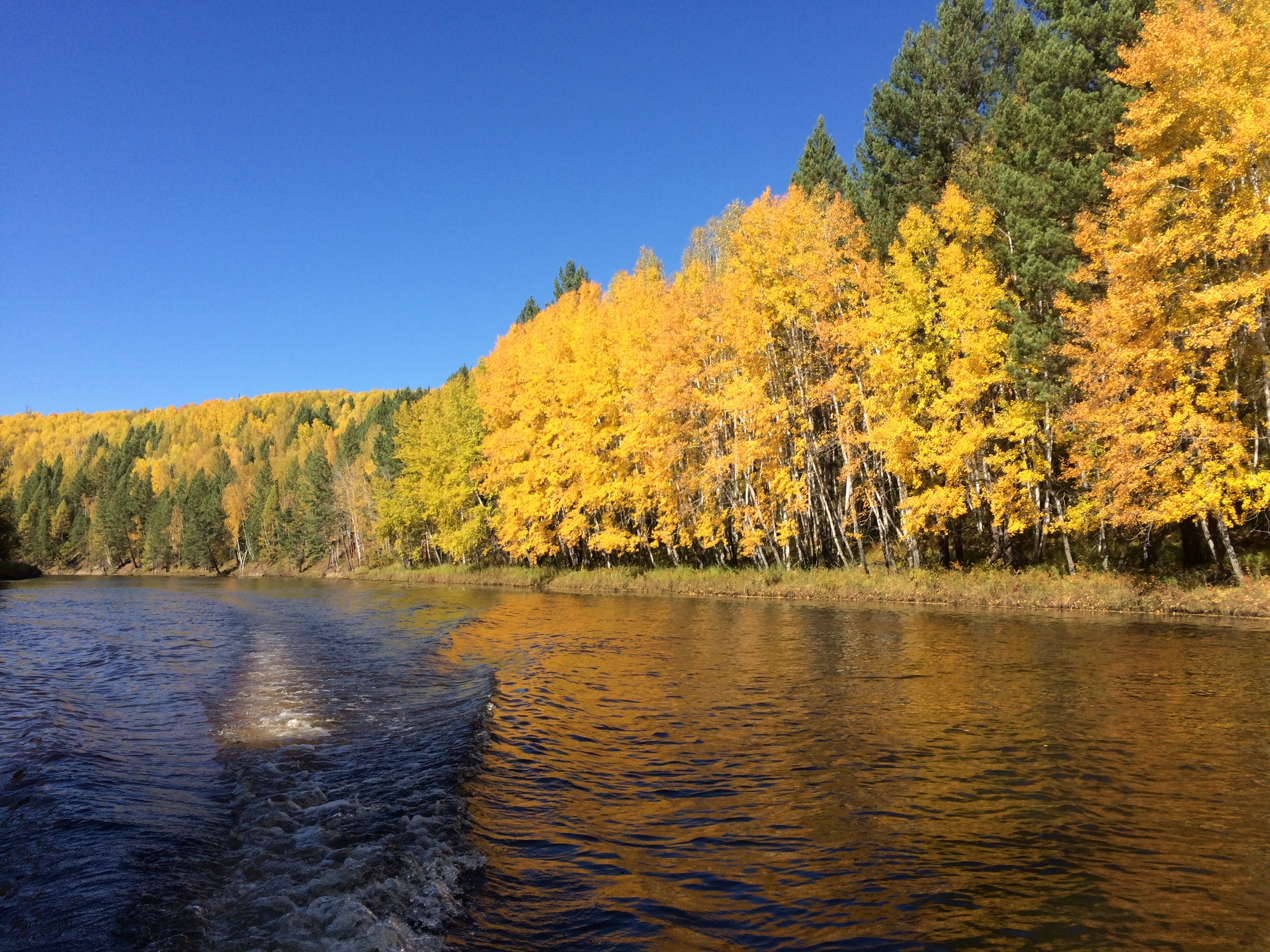

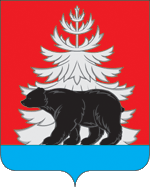
- Flag Coat of arms
- Location of Ziminsky District in Irkutsk Oblast
- Coordinates: 53°55′N 102°03′E
- Country: Russia
- Federal subject: Irkutsk Oblast
- Established: 14 February 1923
- Administrative center: Zima

Area
  - Total: 7,000 km^{2} (2,700 sq mi)

Population (2010 Census)
  - Total: 13,383
  - Density: 1.9/km^{2} (5.0/sq mi)
  - Urban: 0%
  - Rural: 100%

Administrative structure
  - Inhabited localities: 51 rural localities

Municipal structure
  - Municipally incorporated as: Ziminsky Municipal District
  - Municipal divisions: 0 urban settlements, 12 rural settlements
- Time zone: UTC+8 (MSK+5)
- OKTMO ID: 25610000
- Website: http://www.rzima.ru/

Ziminsky District (Russian: Зими́нский райо́н) is an administrative district, one of the thirty-three in Irkutsk Oblast, Russia. Municipally, it is incorporated as Ziminsky Municipal District. The area of the district is 7,000 square kilometers (2,700 sq mi). Its administrative center is the town of Zima (which is not administratively a part of the district). Population: 13,383 (2010 Census); 14,420 (2002 Census); 15,833 (1989 Soviet census).

== Administrative and municipal status ==
Within the framework of administrative divisions, Ziminsky District is one of the thirty-three in the oblast. The town of Zima serves as its administrative center, despite being incorporated separately as an administrative unit with the status equal to that of the districts.

As a municipal division, the district is incorporated as Ziminsky Municipal District. The Town of Zima is incorporated separately from the district as Ziminskoye Urban Okrug.
