= Botanic Garden of the Irkutsk State University =

Botanical garden in Irkutsk, Siberia

Coordinates: 52.2625°N 104.2470°E

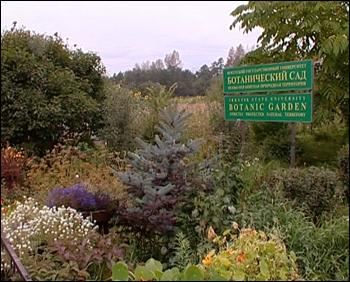
Irkutsk Botanic Garden

The Botanic Garden of the Irkutsk State University is a botanic garden in Irkutsk, Siberia, Russia.

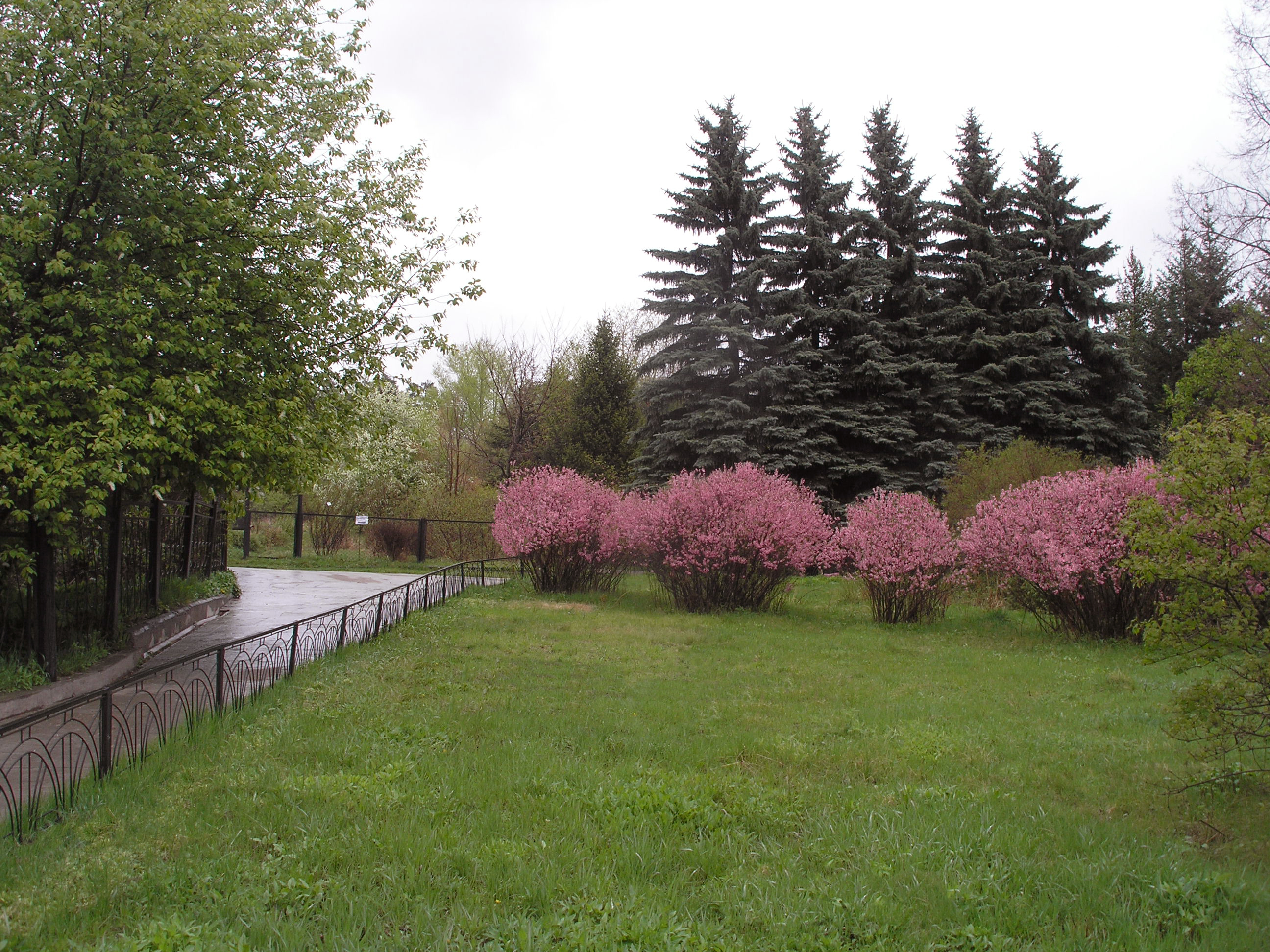
Prunus pedunculata (pink-flowered shrubs) and Picea pungens (background trees) in spring

It is the only botanic garden in Baikalian Siberia (the Lake Baikal region) and is known as the Irkutsk Botanic Garden. Its mission is "to protect and enrich the flora of the Lake Baikal area and the world for people through public education, collection, propagation, research, and conservation of plants." The garden is principally an educational and scientific tool for the university and maintains the largest living plant collection in the region (more than 5000 plant taxa), an herbarium and a seedbank. It occupies 27 hectares (67 acres) within Irkutsk city, 70 kilometres (43 mi) west of Lake Baikal. It has the status of being federal strictly protected land and a nature memorial of Irkutsk.

Irkutsk Botanic Garden is now used as a cross-disciplinary educational and research facility by different departments and faculties of Irkutsk State University and other universities of the Lake Baikal region, in a broad range of disciplines including botany, zoology, ecology, agronomy, soil science, geography, landscape architecture, management, economics, mathematics, informatics, service and marketing, psychology, social sciences and sociology, and tourism.

On the basis of environmental resources of the university Botanic Garden and Kaya Grove, the Irkutsk Mayor office along with the Irkutsk State University are going to establish a public Irkutsk Botanic Garden as ecological techno-park and tourism and recreation center on the territory of 100 hectares. It is a member of the BGCI (Botanic Gardens Conservation International) and the EABGN (East Asian Botanic Gardens Network).

== Publications ==
- Species-richness patterns of the living collections of the world's botanic gardens: a matter of socio-economics? Authors: Janice Golding, Sabine Gusewell, Holger Kreft, Victor Kuzevanov, Susanna Lehvavirta, Ingrid Parmentier and Marco Pautasso. - Annals of Botany 105: 689–696, 2010
- BOTANIC GARDENS AS ECOLOGICAL RESOURCES IN A GLOBAL SYSTEM of SOCIAL COORDINATES. Victor Kuzevanov. — Architectural magazine «LANDSCAPE ARCHITECTURE AND DESIGN» (Moscow), vol. 29, No 2, p. 7-11, 2010.(Russian version and English version)
- RAISING OF COMPETITIVENESS AND TOURIST ATTRACTIVENESS VIA INNOVATIVE ECOLOGICAL PROJECTS BASED ON A PUBLIC-PRIVATE PARTNERSHIP. Authors: Nadezda Ya. Kalyuzhnova, Victor Ya. Kuzevanov, Elena V. Guby. - Journal of International Scientific Publication: Economy & Business (Bulgaria), Vol. 4, Part 2, P.37-61, 2010.
- BOTANIC GARDEN FOR IRKUTSK. ABOUT RECONSTRUCTION OF THE UNIVERSITY BOTANIC GARDEN IN THE BAIKAL REGION. V.Ya.Kuzevanov, A.J.Parshin. — Architectural magazine « ARCHITECTURE. CONSTRUCTION. DESIGN» (Moscow), No 3, p. 80-83, 2010.
- THE PROJECT OF THE IRKUTSK BOTANICAL GARDEN ON BASIS ЭКОЛОГИЗАЦИИ OF SYSTEM OF LAND TENURE IN CONDITIONS OF FORMATION OF THE MARKET OF THE GROUND OF IRKUTSK. V. Ya. Kuzevanov. In: Land resources, housing construction and economic development of regions: Materials of the All-Russia scientific - practical conference (Irkutsk, March, 25 – 26, 2010). — Irkutsk: Publishing house IRGTU, p. 61-78, 2010.
- THE OASIS OF SCIENCE, EDUCATION AND RECREATION. M.Ogneva. The political newspaper "OBLASTNAYA", Irkutsk, on March 3, 2010.
- «BOTANIC GARDEN» OF V.N.BASNIN. In: Connection of times: Basnins in a history of Irkutsk / Eds. S.I.Medvedev, E.M.Pospehova, V.N.Chebykina. — Irkutsk:Printing house «On Chekhova», 2008. — p. 48-61. V. Ya. Kuzevanov. The article about the botanical garden first in Siberia created in Irkutsk by a merchant Vasily Nikolaevich Basnin with assistance classics of botany of Nikolay Stepanovich Turczaninov in the middle of the 19th century.
- «THE CATALOGUE OF PLANTS OF THE V.N.BASNIN'S GARDEN». V. Ya. Kuzevanov. In: Connection of times: Basnins in a history of Irkutsk / Eds. S.I.Medvedev, E.M.Pospehova, V.N.Chebykina. — Irkutsk:Printing house «On Chekhova», 2008. — p. 128-138.
- THE KAYA HERITAGE. Part 1. Victor Kuzevanov. PROJECT BAIKAL (Journal of Irkutsk Branch of the Union of Architects of Russia), № 19, 2009, p. 52-59.
- THE KAYA HERITAGE. Part 2 (continuation). Victor Kuzevanov and Svetlana Sizykh. PROJECT BAIKAL (Journal of Irkutsk Branch of the Union of Architects of Russia), № 20, 2009, p. 38-45.
- RESOURCES of the BOTANICAL GARDEN of IRKUTSK STATE UNIVERSITY: scientific, educational and socio-ecological aspects. V. Ya. Kuzevanov, S.V.Sizykh. Irkutsk: Publishing house of Irkutsk State University, 2005.-243 pages.
- UNIVERSITY BOTANIC GARDENS IN SYSTEM ECO-EDUCATION. The concept of development of ecological education in the Russian Federation in view of a key role of university botanical gardens as unique scientific-educational objects. V. Ya. Kuzevanov, A.R.Vodyanik. The All-Russia conference by ecological education, Moscow, on October, 21 – 23, 2009 — the Electronic resource in State Public Scientific Technical Library
- UNIVERSITY BOTANIC GARDEN AS THE EDUCATIONAL RESOURCE FOR THE BAIKAL REGION: material and non-material aspects. Proceedings of 6th international congress BGCI on education in botanical gardens, on September, 10 – 14, 2006, Oxford
- HORTICULTURAL THERAPY: Use of botanic garden resources for social adaptation and rehabilitation. The reference manual. Irkutsk: Publishing house of Irkutsk State University, 2006.- 48 pages.
- EDEM IN THE CITY MASTER-PLAN. (Newspaper «The East-Siberian Truth» № 25518, February 21, 2007)
- MISSION OF THE BOTANICAL GARDEN TO THE BAIKAL REGION. Proceedings of the 3-rd Global Congress of Botanic Gardens, Wuhan, China, 2007
- RESOURCES OF THE BOTANICAL GARDEN: LINKAGE OF THE BIODIVERSITY AND WELL-BEING OF PEOPLE. Proceedings of the 3-rd Global Congress of Botanic Gardens, Wuhan, China, 2007
- ABOUT THE PROJECT OF DEVELOPMENT OF THE IRKUTSK BOTANICAL GARDEN, Magazine « Science from First-Hand», Number 1, 13 (2007), p 10-11 (Photos by V.A.Korotkoruchko)
- BOTANIC GARDENS RESOURCES: TANGIBLE AND INTANGIBLE ASPECTS OF LINKING BIODIVERSITY AND HUMAN WELL-BEING, Hiroshima Peace Science Journal, 28 (2006), p 113-134
- SPECIES-RICHNESS PATTERNS OF THE LIVING COLLECTIONS OF THE WORLD'S BOTANIC GARDENS: A MATTER OF SOCIO-ECONOMICS? Janice Golding, Sabine Güsewell, Holger Kreft, Victor Ya. Kuzevanov, Susanna Lehvävirta, Ingrid Parmentier and Marco Pautasso, Annals of Botany 105: 689–696, 2010
- BOTANIC GARDENS AS ECOLOGICAL RESOURCES IN THE GLOBAL SYSTEM OF SOCIAL COORDINATES. Kuzevanov V .Ya., Sizykh E.V., Gubiy E.V. In: Economic and environmental problems in the changing world (The collective monography). S.-Petersburg: Publishing house NPK "Rost". 2010. p. 158-167
