= Tulun =

Town in Irkutsk Oblast, Russia

Tulun Тулун
- Town
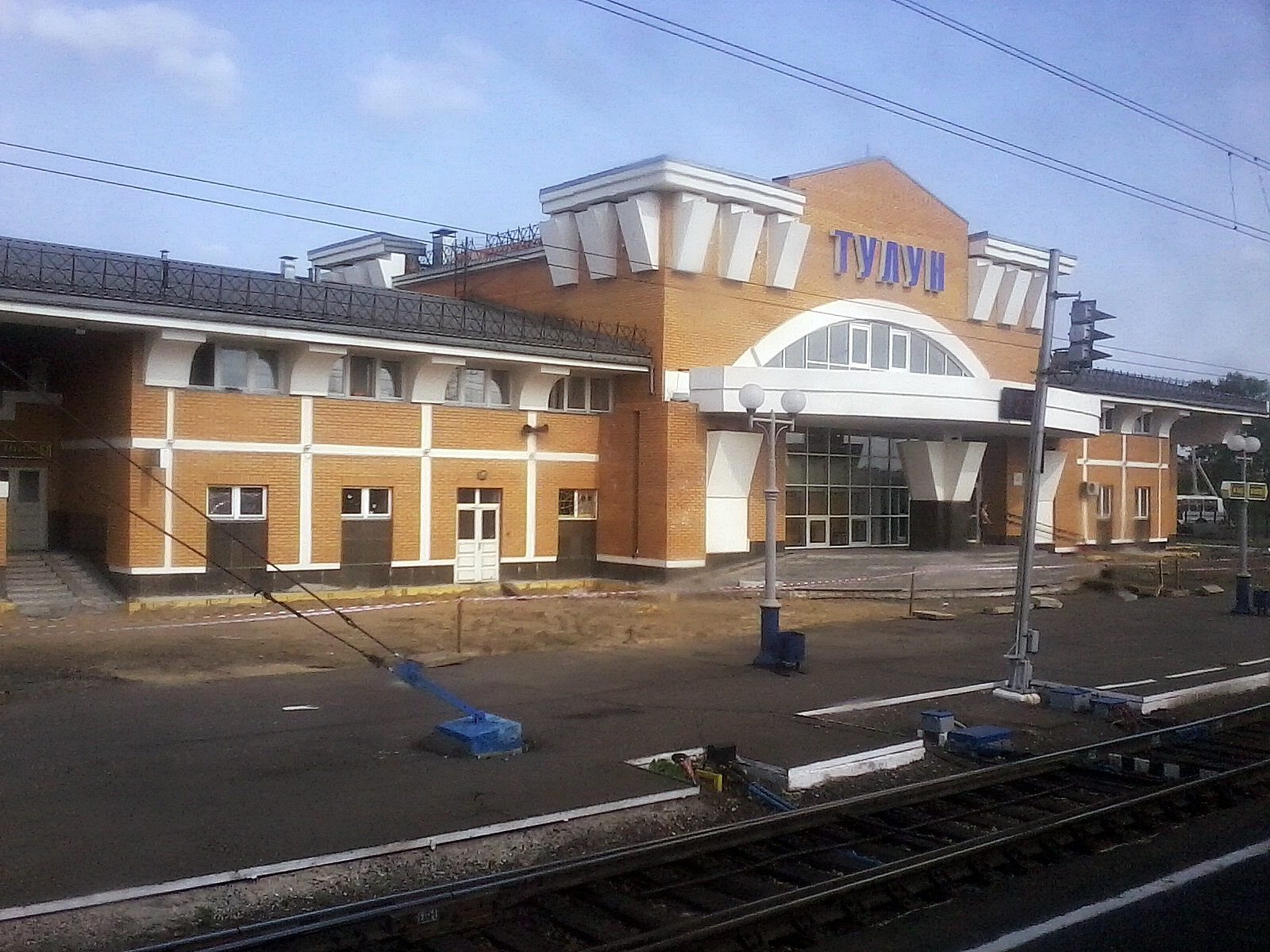
- Tulun Train Station

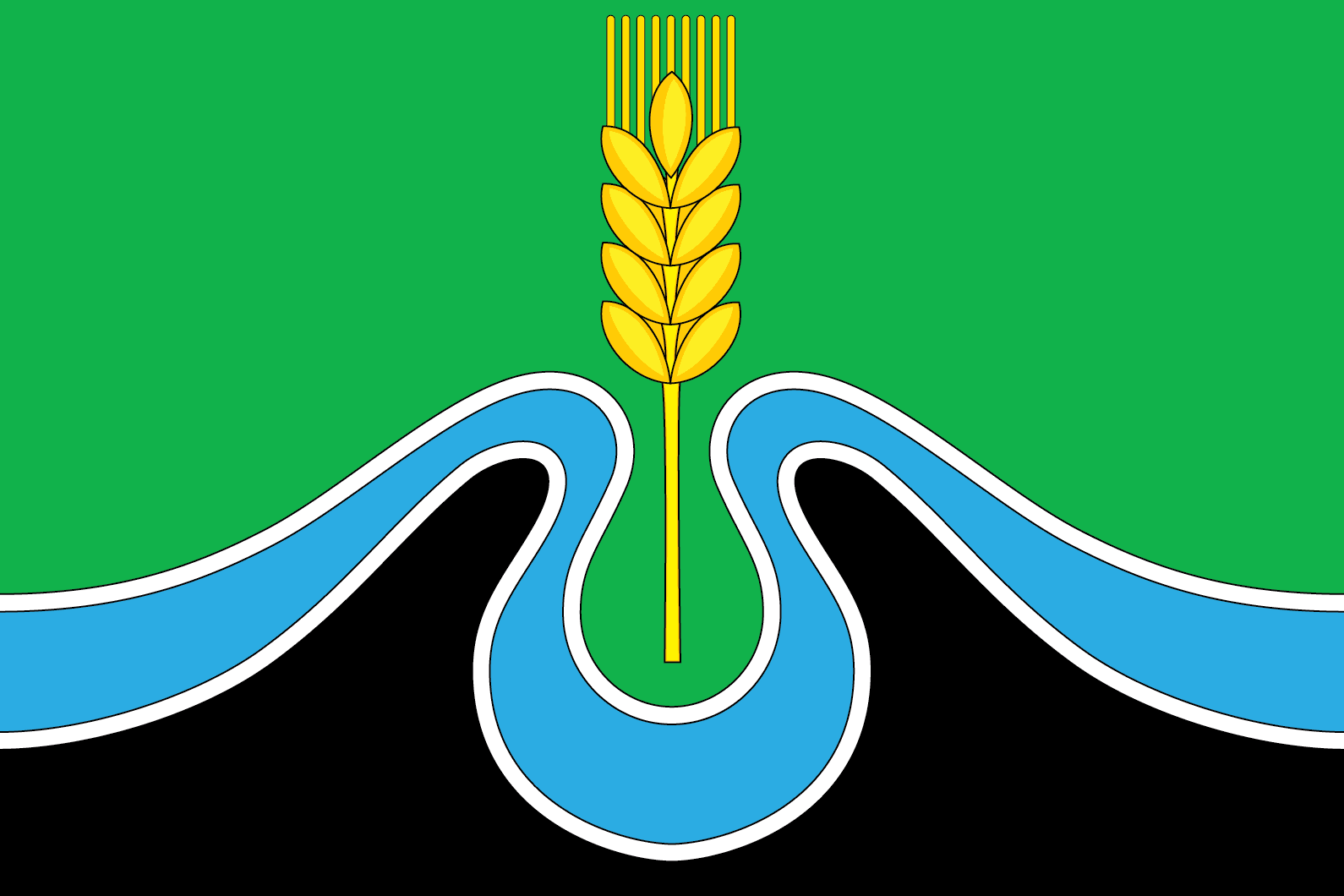
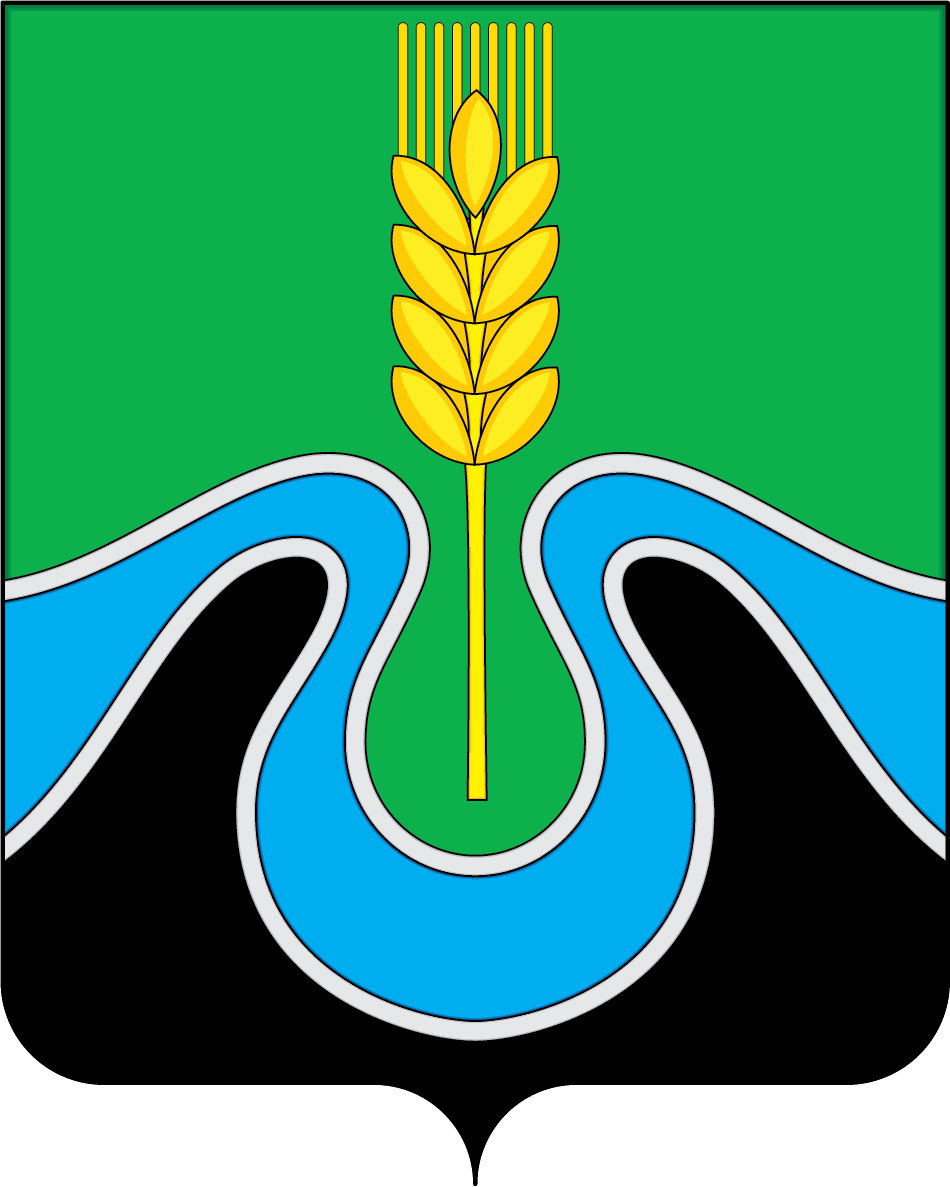
- Flag Coat of arms
- Interactive map of Tulun
- Location of Tulun Tulun (Irkutsk Oblast)
- Coordinates: 54°34′N 100°34′E
- Country: Russia
- Federal subject: Irkutsk Oblast
- Founded: second half of the 18th century
- Town status since: 1927
- Elevation: 460 m (1,510 ft)

Population (2010 Census)
  - Total: 44,611
  - Estimate (2025): 37,366 (−16.2%)
  - Rank: 355th in 2010

Administrative status
  - Subordinated to: Town of Tulun
  - Capital of: Tulunsky District, Town of Tulun

Municipal status
  - Urban okrug: Tulun Urban Okrug
  - Capital of: Tulun Urban Okrug, Tulunsky Municipal District
- Time zone: UTC+8 (MSK+5)
- Postal code: 665250–665268
- Dialing code: +7 39530
- OKTMO ID: 25732000001
- Website: www.tulunadm.ru

Tulun (Russian: Тулун, IPA: [tʊˈlun]) is a town in Irkutsk Oblast, Russia, located on the river Iya (Angara's basin), 390 kilometers (240 mi) northwest of Irkutsk. Population: 44,611 (2010 census); 51,848 (2002 census); 52,903 (1989 Soviet census).

== History ==
It was founded in the second half of the 18th century as a village in the Iya Valley. With the construction of the Trans-Siberian Railway in the early 20th century, Tulun grew into an important trade center. It was administrated as a town between 1922 and 1924, before being granted town status permanently in 1927.

== Administrative and municipal status ==
Within the framework of administrative divisions, Tulun serves as the administrative center of Tulunsky District, even though it is not a part of it. As an administrative division, it is incorporated separately as the Town of Tulun—an administrative unit with the status equal to that of the districts. As a municipal division, the Town of Tulun is incorporated as Tulun Urban Okrug.

== Geography ==
=== Climate ===
Tulun has a subarctic climate (Köppen Dfc) with mild to warm, humid summers and severely cold, drier winters. The monthly 24-hour average temperature ranges from −19.9 °C (−3.8 °F) in January to 17.7 °C (63.9 °F). Sunshine is generous and the area receives 2,237 hours of bright sunshine annually.

Climate data for Tulun (1948−2011)
Month	Jan	Feb	Mar	Apr	May	Jun	Jul	Aug	Sep	Oct	Nov	Dec	Year
Record high °C (°F)	4.7 (40.5)	8.7 (47.7)	17.7 (63.9)	28.4 (83.1)	32.2 (90.0)	36.0 (96.8)	35.8 (96.4)	36.5 (97.7)	30.0 (86.0)	25.0 (77.0)	13.5 (56.3)	7.0 (44.6)	36.5 (97.7)
Mean daily maximum °C (°F)	−14.9 (5.2)	−10.2 (13.6)	−1.8 (28.8)	7.1 (44.8)	16.2 (61.2)	22.3 (72.1)	24.1 (75.4)	21.2 (70.2)	14.5 (58.1)	5.8 (42.4)	−5.7 (21.7)	−13.3 (8.1)	5.6 (42.1)
Daily mean °C (°F)	−20.4 (−4.7)	−17.0 (1.4)	−8.9 (16.0)	0.7 (33.3)	8.7 (47.7)	15.1 (59.2)	17.5 (63.5)	14.6 (58.3)	7.7 (45.9)	−0.1 (31.8)	−10.9 (12.4)	−18.3 (−0.9)	−0.8 (30.6)
Mean daily minimum °C (°F)	−25.6 (−14.1)	−23.1 (−9.6)	−15.4 (4.3)	−5 (23)	1.6 (34.9)	8.0 (46.4)	11.1 (52.0)	8.7 (47.7)	2.3 (36.1)	−4.7 (23.5)	−15.7 (3.7)	−23.1 (−9.6)	−6.6 (20.1)
Record low °C (°F)	−46.1 (−51.0)	−47.2 (−53.0)	−41.1 (−42.0)	−26.5 (−15.7)	−10 (14)	−5.0 (23.0)	−0.4 (31.3)	−3.0 (26.6)	−11.1 (12.0)	−29 (−20)	−40 (−40)	−45 (−49)	−47.2 (−53.0)
Average precipitation mm (inches)	17.6 (0.69)	16.9 (0.67)	10.4 (0.41)	25.7 (1.01)	28.4 (1.12)	54.5 (2.15)	75.6 (2.98)	53.5 (2.11)	35.0 (1.38)	22.1 (0.87)	16.2 (0.64)	17.4 (0.69)	373.3 (14.72)
Average precipitation days (≥ 0.1 mm)	18.8	15.1	11.3	12.9	13.0	12.4	11.3	13.5	13.2	16.9	18.2	20.1	176.7
Average relative humidity (%)	81.3	73.8	62.6	56.7	53.9	65.8	72.7	75.4	72.5	72.3	78.0	83.5	70.7
Mean monthly sunshine hours	105.4	134.4	210.8	246.0	266.6	273.0	269.7	248.0	186.0	127.1	93.0	77.5	2,237.5
Source: climatebase.ru

== Economy and infrastructure ==
The town is a center for timber and brown coal production. The Azeysky and Tulunsky open cut coal mines are located nearby and there is an associated hydrolysis plant in the town.
