= Znamenka, Russia =

Znamenka (Russian: Знаменка) or Znamyonka (Знамёнка) is the name of several inhabited localities in Russia.

== Altai Krai ==
As of 2010, one rural locality in Altai Krai bears this name:

- Znamenka, Altai Krai, a selo under the administrative jurisdiction of the town of krai significance of Slavgorod

== Amur Oblast ==
As of 2010, one rural locality in Amur Oblast bears this name:

- Znamenka, Amur Oblast, a selo in Znamensky Rural Settlement of Romnensky District

== Republic of Bashkortostan ==
As of 2010, four rural localities in the Republic of Bashkortostan bear this name:

- Znamenka, Belebeyevsky District, Republic of Bashkortostan, a selo in Znamensky Selsoviet of Belebeyevsky District
- Znamenka, Kuyurgazinsky District, Republic of Bashkortostan, a village in Krivle-Ilyushkinsky Selsoviet of Kuyurgazinsky District
- Znamenka, Tuymazinsky District, Republic of Bashkortostan, a village in Nikolayevsky Selsoviet of Tuymazinsky District
- Znamenka, Yermekeyevsky District, Republic of Bashkortostan, a selo in Vosmomartovsky Selsoviet of Yermekeyevsky District

== Belgorod Oblast ==
As of 2010, three rural localities in Belgorod Oblast bear this name:

- Znamenka, Shebekinsky District, Belgorod Oblast, a khutor in Shebekinsky District
- Znamenka, Starooskolsky District, Belgorod Oblast, a selo in Starooskolsky District
- Znamenka, Valuysky District, Belgorod Oblast, a selo under the administrative jurisdiction of Urazovsky Settlement Okrug of Valuysky District

== Bryansk Oblast ==
As of 2010, one rural locality in Bryansk Oblast bears this name:

- Znamyonka, Bryansk Oblast, a settlement in Usozhsky Selsoviet of Komarichsky District

== Chelyabinsk Oblast ==
As of 2010, two rural localities in Chelyabinsk Oblast bear this name:

- Znamenka, Kaslinsky District, Chelyabinsk Oblast, a village in Grigoryevsky Selsoviet of Kaslinsky District
- Znamenka, Nagaybaksky District, Chelyabinsk Oblast, a settlement in Fershampenuazsky Selsoviet of Nagaybaksky District

== Chuvash Republic ==
As of 2010, one rural locality in the Chuvash Republic bears this name:

- Znamenka, Chuvash Republic, a settlement in Altyshevskoye Rural Settlement of Alatyrsky District

== Irkutsk Oblast ==
As of 2010, one rural locality in Irkutsk Oblast bears this name:

- Znamenka, Irkutsk Oblast, a selo in Zhigalovsky District

== Kaliningrad Oblast ==
As of 2010, four rural localities in Kaliningrad Oblast bear this name:

- Znamenka, Bagrationovsky District, Kaliningrad Oblast, a settlement in Pogranichny Rural Okrug of Bagrationovsky District
- Znamenka, Guryevsky District, Kaliningrad Oblast, a settlement in Dobrinsky Rural Okrug of Guryevsky District
- Znamenka, Nesterovsky District, Kaliningrad Oblast, a settlement in Chistoprudnensky Rural Okrug of Nesterovsky District
- Znamenka, Pravdinsky District, Kaliningrad Oblast, a settlement under the administrative jurisdiction of the urban-type settlement of district significance of Zheleznodorozhny in Pravdinsky District

== Karachay-Cherkess Republic ==
As of 2010, one rural locality in the Karachay-Cherkess Republic bears this name:

- Znamenka, Karachay-Cherkess Republic, a selo in Prikubansky District

== Kemerovo Oblast ==
As of 2010, one rural locality in Kemerovo Oblast bears this name:

- Znamenka, Kemerovo Oblast, a village in Suslovskaya Rural Territory of Mariinsky District

== Republic of Khakassia ==
As of 2010, one rural locality in the Republic of Khakassia bears this name:

- Znamenka, Republic of Khakassia, a selo in Znamensky Selsoviet of Bogradsky District

== Kirov Oblast ==
As of 2010, two rural localities in Kirov Oblast bear this name:

- Znamenka, Darovskoy District, Kirov Oblast, a settlement in Kobrsky Rural Okrug of Darovskoy District
- Znamenka, Yaransky District, Kirov Oblast, a mestechko in Znamensky Rural Okrug of Yaransky District

== Komi Republic ==
As of 2010, one rural locality in the Komi Republic bears this name:

- Znamenka, Komi Republic, a settlement in Znamenka Rural-Type Settlement Administrative Territory of Troitsko-Pechorsky District

== Kostroma Oblast ==
As of 2010, one rural locality in Kostroma Oblast bears this name:

- Znamenka, Kostroma Oblast, a village in Znamenskoye Settlement of Manturovsky District

== Krasnoyarsk Krai ==
As of 2010, two rural localities in Krasnoyarsk Krai bear this name:

- Znamenka, Kuraginsky District, Krasnoyarsk Krai, a village under the administrative jurisdiction of the work settlement of Bolshaya Irba in Kuraginsky District
- Znamenka, Minusinsky District, Krasnoyarsk Krai, a selo in Znamensky Selsoviet of Minusinsky District

== Kursk Oblast ==
As of 2010, three rural localities in Kursk Oblast bear this name:

- Znamenka, Gorshechensky District, Kursk Oblast, a selo in Znamensky Selsoviet of Gorshechensky District
- Znamenka, Medvensky District, Kursk Oblast, a selo in Vyshnedubovetsky Selsoviet of Medvensky District
- Znamenka, Oboyansky District, Kursk Oblast, a village in Bykanovsky Selsoviet of Oboyansky District

== Lipetsk Oblast ==
As of 2010, six rural localities in Lipetsk Oblast bear this name:

- Znamenka, Dankovsky District, Lipetsk Oblast, a village in Voskresensky Selsoviet of Dankovsky District
- Znamenka, Dolgorukovsky District, Lipetsk Oblast, a village in Voyskovokazinsky Selsoviet of Dolgorukovsky District
- Znamenka, Izmalkovsky District, Lipetsk Oblast, a village in Ponomarevsky Selsoviet of Izmalkovsky District
- Znamenka, Khlevensky District, Lipetsk Oblast, a village in Sindyakinsky Selsoviet of Khlevensky District
- Znamenka, Krasninsky District, Lipetsk Oblast, a village in Alexandrovsky Selsoviet of Krasninsky District
- Znamenka, Zadonsky District, Lipetsk Oblast, a village in Yuryevsky Selsoviet of Zadonsky District

== Moscow Oblast ==
As of 2010, two rural localities in Moscow Oblast bear this name:

- Znamenka, Mozhaysky District, Moscow Oblast, a village in Borisovskoye Rural Settlement of Mozhaysky District
- Znamenka, Voskresensky District, Moscow Oblast, a village under the administrative jurisdiction of the work settlement of imeni Tsyurupy in Voskresensky District

== Nizhny Novgorod Oblast ==
As of 2010, three rural localities in Nizhny Novgorod Oblast bear this name:

- Znamenka, Bolsheboldinsky District, Nizhny Novgorod Oblast, a selo in Bolsheboldinsky Selsoviet of Bolsheboldinsky District
- Znamenka, Kulebaksky District, Nizhny Novgorod Oblast, a village in Serebryansky Selsoviet of Kulebaksky District
- Znamenka, Voznesensky District, Nizhny Novgorod Oblast, a village in Blagodatovsky Selsoviet of Voznesensky District

== Novgorod Oblast ==
As of 2010, two rural localities in Novgorod Oblast bear this name:

- Znamenka, Borovichsky District, Novgorod Oblast, a village in Zhelezkovskoye Settlement of Borovichsky District
- Znamenka, Malovishersky District, Novgorod Oblast, a village in Verebyinskoye Settlement of Malovishersky District

== Oryol Oblast ==
As of 2010, four inhabited localities in Oryol Oblast bear this name:

Urban localities

- Znamenka, Orlovsky District, Oryol Oblast, an urban-type settlement in Orlovsky District

Rural localities

- Znamenka, Maloarkhangelsky District, Oryol Oblast, a village in Lukovsky Selsoviet of Maloarkhangelsky District
- Znamenka, Karandakovsky Selsoviet, Mtsensky District, Oryol Oblast, a village in Karandakovsky Selsoviet of Mtsensky District
- Znamenka, Spassko-Lutovinovsky Selsoviet, Mtsensky District, Oryol Oblast, a village in Spassko-Lutovinovsky Selsoviet of Mtsensky District

== Penza Oblast ==
As of 2010, one rural locality in Penza Oblast bears this name:

- Znamenka, Penza Oblast, a settlement in Kamensky Selsoviet of Kamensky District

== Primorsky Krai ==
As of 2010, one rural locality in Primorsky Krai bears this name:

- Znamenka, Primorsky Krai, a selo in Pozharsky District

== Pskov Oblast ==
As of 2010, one rural locality in Pskov Oblast bears this name:

- Znamenka, Pskov Oblast, a village in Pskovsky District

== Rostov Oblast ==
As of 2010, two rural localities in Rostov Oblast bear this name:

- Znamenka, Azovsky District, Rostov Oblast, a settlement in Semibalkovskoye Rural Settlement of Azovsky District
- Znamenka, Morozovsky District, Rostov Oblast, a settlement in Znamenskoye Rural Settlement of Morozovsky District

== Ryazan Oblast ==
As of 2010, three rural localities in Ryazan Oblast bear this name:

- Znamenka, Miloslavsky District, Ryazan Oblast, a selo in Bolshepodovechinsky Rural Okrug of Miloslavsky District
- Znamenka, Alexandro-Nevsky District, Ryazan Oblast, a village in Pavlovsky Rural Okrug of Alexandro-Nevsky District
- Znamenka, Pitelinsky District, Ryazan Oblast, a village in Petsky Rural Okrug of Pitelinsky District

== Samara Oblast ==
As of 2010, two rural localities in Samara Oblast bear this name:

- Znamenka, Bogatovsky District, Samara Oblast, a selo in Bogatovsky District
- Znamenka, Yelkhovsky District, Samara Oblast, a selo in Yelkhovsky District

== Smolensk Oblast ==
As of 2010, two rural localities in Smolensk Oblast bear this name:

- Znamenka, Smolensky District, Smolensk Oblast, a village in Prigorskoye Rural Settlement of Smolensky District
- Znamenka, Ugransky District, Smolensk Oblast, a selo in Znamenskoye Rural Settlement of Ugransky District

== Tambov Oblast ==
As of 2010, five inhabited localities in Tambov Oblast bear this name:

Urban localities

- Znamenka, Znamensky District, Tambov Oblast, a work settlement under the administrative jurisdiction of Znamensky Settlement Council of Znamensky District

Rural localities

- Znamenka, Bondarsky District, Tambov Oblast, a selo in Mitropolsky Selsoviet of Bondarsky District
- Znamenka, Nikiforovsky District, Tambov Oblast, a selo in Yaroslavsky Selsoviet of Nikiforovsky District
- Znamenka, Petrovsky District, Tambov Oblast, a selo in Volchkovsky Selsoviet of Petrovsky District
- Znamenka, Tokaryovsky District, Tambov Oblast, a village in Danilovsky Selsoviet of Tokaryovsky District

== Tula Oblast ==
As of 2010, two rural localities in Tula Oblast bear this name:

- Znamenka, Chernsky District, Tula Oblast, a village in Velyenikolskaya Rural Administration of Chernsky District
- Znamenka, Novomoskovsky District, Tula Oblast, a village in Prokhorovsky Rural Okrug of Novomoskovsky District

== Tver Oblast ==
As of 2010, two rural localities in Tver Oblast bear this name:

- Znamenka, Rameshkovsky District, Tver Oblast, a village in Kiverichi Rural Settlement of Rameshkovsky District
- Znamenka, Staritsky District, Tver Oblast, a village in Pankovo Rural Settlement of Staritsky District

== Vladimir Oblast ==
As of 2010, one rural locality in Vladimir Oblast bears this name:

- Znamenka, Vladimir Oblast, a village in Selivanovsky District

== Voronezh Oblast ==
As of 2010, two rural localities in Voronezh Oblast bear this name:

- Znamenka, Ertilsky District, Voronezh Oblast, a settlement in Pervoertilskoye Rural Settlement of Ertilsky District
- Znamenka, Talovsky District, Voronezh Oblast, a selo in Abramovskoye 2-ye Rural Settlement of Talovsky District

== Zabaykalsky Krai ==
As of 2010, one rural locality in Zabaykalsky Krai bears this name:

- Znamenka, Zabaykalsky Krai, a selo in Nerchinsky District
