= Zvyozdny =

Zvyozdny (masculine), Zvyozdnaya (feminine), or Zvyozdnoye (neuter) may refer to:

- Zvyozdnoye Municipal Okrug, a municipal okrug of Moskovsky District of Saint Petersburg, Russia
- Zvyozdny (inhabited locality) (Zvyozdnaya, Zvyozdnoye), name of several inhabited localities in Russia
- Zvyozdnaya, a station of the St. Petersburg Metro, St. Petersburg, Russia
- Zvyozdny, Chukotka Autonomous Okrug, an abandoned settlement on Wrangel Island.

== See also ==
- Star City (disambiguation)
- Zvyozdny gorodok (disambiguation)
