= Rudovka, Irkutsk Oblast =

Rudovka Рудовка
- Selo
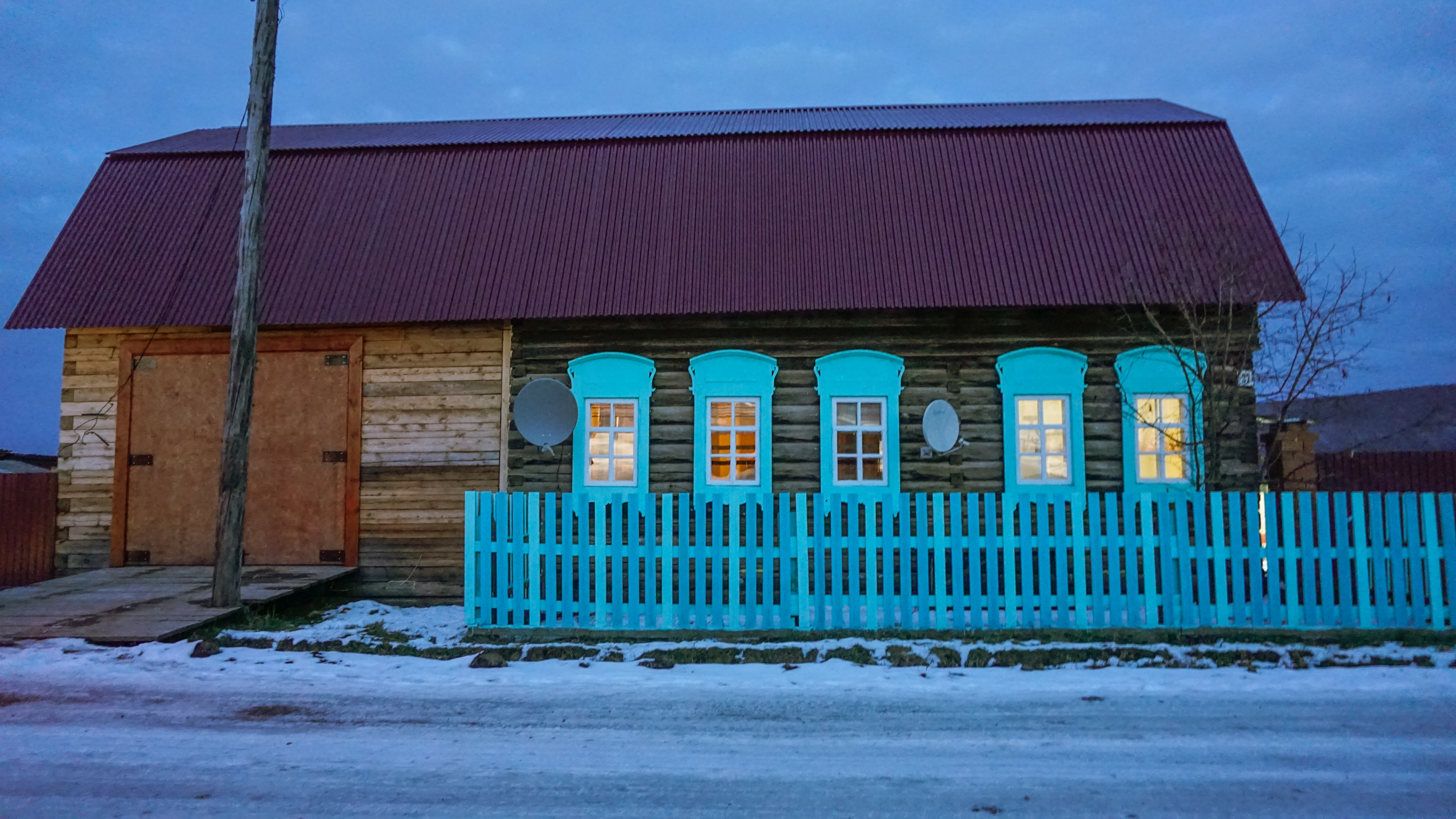
- View of a house in Rudovka
- Interactive map of Rudovka
- Location of Rudovka Rudovka (Irkutsk Oblast)
- Coordinates: 54°44′49″N 105°12′32″E
- Country: Russia
- Federal subject: Irkutsk Oblast
- Administrative district: Zhigalovsky District
- Elevation: 423 m (1,388 ft)

Population
  - Estimate (2012): 308 )

Municipal status
  - Capital of: Rudovka Rural Settlement (Рудовского сельского поселения)
- Time zone: UTC+8 (MSK+5)
- Postal code: 666419
- OKTMO ID: 25606425101

Rudovka (Russian: Рудовка) is a rural locality in Zhigalovsky District of Irkutsk Oblast, Russia. Population: 369 (2002 census); in 2010 it had 323 inhabitants, according to the Russian Census (2010).

== Geography ==
The village is located on the left bank of the Lena river, about 5 km (3.1 mi) SSE of Zhigalovo, the district administrative center.

== See also ==
- Lena-Angara Plateau
