= Zvyozdny (inhabited locality) =

Zvyozdny (Russian: Звёздный; masculine), Zvyozdnaya (Звёздная; feminine), or Zvyozdnoye (Звёздное; neuter) is the name of several inhabited localities in Russia.

Urban localities

- Zvyozdny, Irkutsk Oblast, a work settlement in Ust-Kutsky District of Irkutsk Oblast
- Zvyozdny, Perm Krai, an urban-type settlement in Perm Krai under the administrative jurisdiction of the closed administrative-territorial formation of the same name

Rural localities

- Zvyozdny, Kabardino-Balkar Republic, a settlement in Chegemsky District of the Kabardino-Balkar Republic; 43°30′N 43°29′E
- Zvyozdny, Kemerovo Oblast, a settlement in Zvezdnaya Rural Territory of Kemerovsky District in Kemerovo Oblast; 55°27′N 85°51′E
- Zvyozdny, Republic of Mordovia, a settlement in Bersenevsky Selsoviet of Lyambirsky District in the Republic of Mordovia; 54°14′N 45°5′E
- Zvyozdny, Volgograd Oblast, a settlement in Kuybyshevsky Selsoviet of Sredneakhtubinsky District in Volgograd Oblast
- Zvyozdnoye, a selo in Krasnogvardeysky District of the Republic of Crimea
