= Novorossiyka =

Novorossiyka (Russian: Новороссийка) is the name of several rural localities in Russia:

- Novorossiyka, Mazanovsky District, Amur Oblast, a selo in Novorossiysky Selsoviet of Mazanovsky District, Amur Oblast
- Novorossiyka, Romnensky District, Amur Oblast, a selo in Verkhnebelsky Selsoviet of Romnensky District, Amur Oblast
