= Amaranka =

Amaranka Амаранка
- Selo
- Location within Amur Oblast Location within Russia
- Coordinates: 50°41′N 129°35′E
- Country: Russia
- Region: Amur Oblast
- District: Romnensky District
- Time zone: UTC+9:00

Amaranka (Russian: Амаранка) is a rural locality (a selo) and the administrative center of Amaransky Selsoviet of Romnensky District, Amur Oblast, Russia. The population was 244 as of 2018. There are 9 streets.

== Geography ==
Amaranka is located 32 km southeast of Romny (the district's administrative centre) by road. Vostochnaya Niva is the nearest rural locality.
