= Ust-Kutsky =

Ust-Kutsky (masculine), Ust-Kutskaya (feminine), or Ust-Kutskoye (neuter) may refer to:

- Ust-Kutsky District, a district of Irkutsk Oblast, Russia
- Ust-Kutskoye Urban Settlement, a municipal formation which the town of Ust-Kut and the selo of Turuka in Ust-Kutsky District of Irkutsk Oblast, Russia are incorporated as
