= Znamenka, Irkutsk Oblast =

Znamenka Знаменка
- Selo
- Interactive map of Znamenka
- Location of Znamenka Znamenka (Irkutsk Oblast)
- Coordinates: 54°41′45″N 104°50′1″E
- Country: Russia
- Federal subject: Irkutsk Oblast
- Administrative district: Zhigalovsky District

Population
  - Estimate (2012): 573 )

Municipal status
  - Capital of: Znamenka Municipal Unit (Знаменское муниципальное образование)
- Time zone: UTC+8 (MSK+5)
- Postal code: 666411
- OKTMO ID: 25606407101

Znamenka (Russian: Знаменка) is a rural locality in Zhigalovsky District of Irkutsk Oblast, Russia. Population: 740 (2002 census); in 2010 it had 587 inhabitants.

Statesman Ivan Serebrennikov (1882–1953), as well as scientists Boris Mikhailov (1908–1984) and Mikhail Vinokurov (1949–), were born in Znamenka.

== Geography ==
The village is about 22 km (14 mi) southwest of Zhigalovo, the district administrative center. It lies on the left bank of the Ilga river about 8 km (5.0 mi) ENE of Konstantinovka.

== See also ==
- Lena-Angara Plateau
