= Kokhlatskoye =

Kokhlatskoye Хохлатское
- Selo
- Location within Amur Oblast Location within Russia
- Coordinates: 50°52′N 129°23′E
- Country: Russia
- Region: Amur Oblast
- District: Romnensky District
- Time zone: UTC+9:00

Kokhlatskoye (Russian: Хохлатское) is a rural locality (a selo) in Chergalinsky Selsoviet of Romnensky District, Amur Oblast, Russia. The population was 36 as of 2018. There are 3 streets.

== Geography ==
Kokhlatskoye is located 25 km north of Romny (the district's administrative centre) by road. Chergali is the nearest rural locality.
