= Svyatorussovka =

Svyatorussovka Святоруссовка
- Selo
- Location within Amur Oblast Location within Russia
- Coordinates: 50°37′N 129°09′E
- Country: Russia
- Region: Amur Oblast
- District: Romnensky District
- Time zone: UTC+9:00

Svyatorussovka (Russian: Святоруссовка) is a rural locality (a selo) and the administrative center of Svyatorussovsky Selsoviet of Romnensky District, Amur Oblast, Russia. The population was 307 as of 2018. There are 3 streets.

== Geography ==
Svyatorussovka is located on the right bank of the Belaya River, 19 km southwest of Romny (the district's administrative centre) by road. Lyubimoye is the nearest rural locality.
