= Romny, Russia =

Name of several Russian rural localities

Romny (Russian: Ромны) is the name of several rural localities in Russia:

- Romny, Amur Oblast, a selo in Romnensky Rural Settlement of Romnensky District of Amur Oblast
- Romny, Primorsky Krai, a selo in Krasnoarmeysky District of Primorsky Krai
