= Konstantinovka, Irkutsk Oblast =

Konstantinovka Константиновка
- Selo
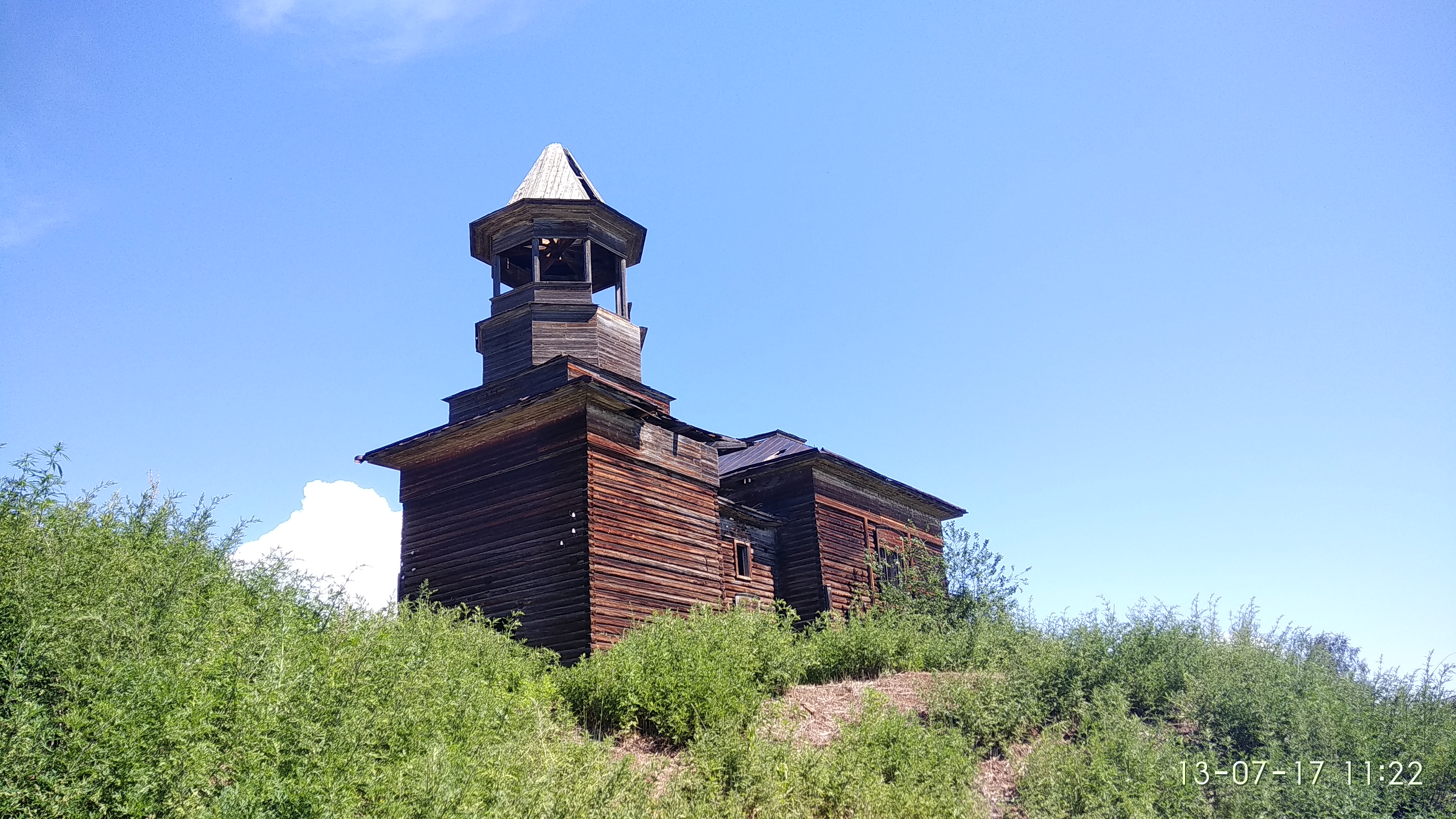
- Trinity Church in Konstantinovka
- Interactive map of Konstantinovka
- Location of Konstantinovka Konstantinovka (Irkutsk Oblast)
- Coordinates: 54°40′05″N 104°45′45″E
- Country: Russia
- Federal subject: Irkutsk Oblast
- Administrative district: Zhigalovsky District
- Elevation: 449 m (1,473 ft)

Population
  - Estimate (2012): 170 )
- Time zone: UTC+8 (MSK+5)
- Postal code: 666418
- OKTMO ID: 25606404111

Konstantinovka (Russian: Константиновка) is a rural locality in Zhigalovsky District of Irkutsk Oblast, Russia. Population: 211 (2002 census);

Russian archaeologist, historian, and ethnographer Alexey Okladnikov (1908–1981) was born in Konstantinovka.

== Geography ==
The village is about 27 km (17 mi) southwest of Zhigalovo, the district administrative center. It lies on the left bank of the Typta river, a tributary of the Ilga.

== See also ==
- Lena-Angara Plateau
