= Ust-Ilga =

Ust-Ilga Усть-Илга
- Selo
- Interactive map of Ust-Ilga
- Location of Ust-Ilga Ust-Ilga (Irkutsk Oblast)
- Coordinates: 55°00′30″N 105°04′47″E
- Country: Russia
- Federal subject: Irkutsk Oblast
- Administrative district: Zhigalovsky District

Population
  - Estimate (2012): 169 )
- Time zone: UTC+8 (MSK+5)
- Postal code: 666420
- OKTMO ID: 25606437101

Ust-Ilga (Russian: Усть-Илга) is a rural locality in Zhigalovsky District of Irkutsk Oblast, Russia. Population: 220 (2002 census);

== Geography ==
The village is about 23 km (14 mi) north of Zhigalovo, the district administrative center. It lies on the left bank of the Ilga river near its confluence with the Lena.

== See also ==
- Lena-Angara Plateau
