= Klimovka =

Klimovka Климовка
- Selo
- Location within Amur Oblast Location within Russia
- Coordinates: 50°35′N 128°33′E
- Country: Russia
- Region: Amur Oblast
- District: Romnensky District
- Time zone: UTC+9:00

Klimovka (Russian: Климовка) is a rural locality (a selo) in Rogozovsky Selsoviet of Romnensky District, Amur Oblast, Russia. The population was 21 as of 2018. There are 2 streets.

== Geography ==
Klimovka is located on the left bank of the Belaya River, 64 km southwest of Romny (the district's administrative centre) by road. Voznesenovka is the nearest rural locality.
