= Seredinnoye =

Seredinnoye Серединное
- Selo
- Location within Amur Oblast Location within Russia
- Coordinates: 50°47′N 129°17′E
- Country: Russia
- Region: Amur Oblast
- District: Romnensky District
- Time zone: UTC+9:00

Seredinnoye (Russian: Серединное) is a rural locality (a selo) in Kakhovsky Selsoviet of Romnensky District, Amur Oblast, Russia. The population was 19 as of 2018. There is 1 street.

== Geography ==
Seredinnoye is located 18 km north of Romny (the district's administrative centre) by road. Kakhovka is the nearest rural locality.
