= Novorossiyka, Romnensky District, Amur Oblast =

Novorossiyka Новороссийка
- Selo
- Location within Amur Oblast Location within Russia
- Coordinates: 50°37′N 128°50′E
- Country: Russia
- Region: Amur Oblast
- District: Romnensky District
- Time zone: UTC+9:00

Novorossiyka (Russian: Новороссийка) is a rural locality (a selo) in Verkhnebelsky Selsoviet of Romnensky District, Amur Oblast, Russia. The population was 148 as of 2018. There are 3 streets.

== Geography ==
Novorossiyka is located left bank of the Belaya River, 42 km southwest of Romny (the district's administrative centre) by road. Pozdeyevka is the nearest rural locality.
