= Namai =

Mountain in Russia

- Намай
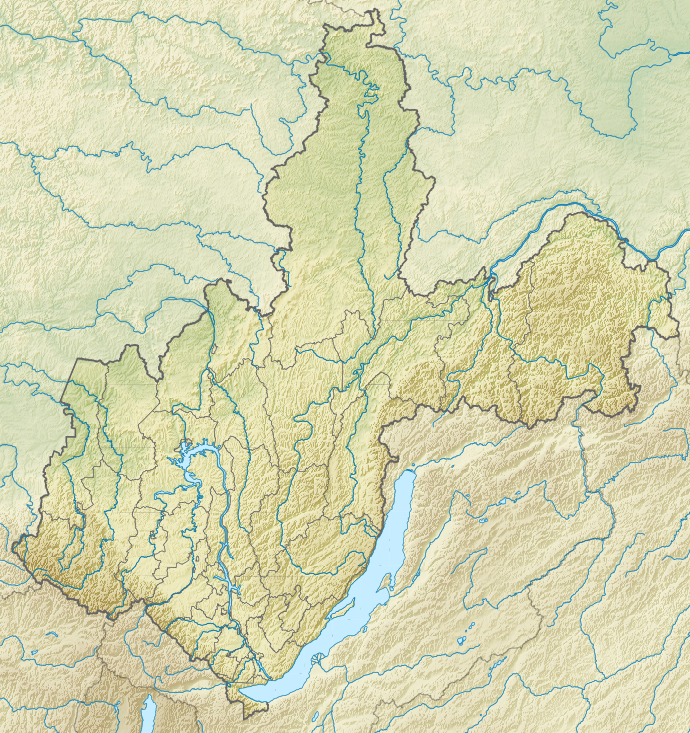
- Location within Irkutsk Oblast Location within Russia

Highest point
- Elevation: 1,509 m (4,951 ft)
- Coordinates: 55°29′58.45″N 106°42′12.64″E

Geography
- Location: Irkutsk Oblast; Russian Federation
- Parent range: Lena-Angara Plateau, Central Siberian Plateau

Climbing
- Easiest route: from Zhigalovo

Namai (Russian: Намай) is a mountain in the Lena-Angara Plateau, Irkutsk Oblast, Russian Federation.

== Geography ==
This 1,509 m (4,951 ft) high summit is the highest point of the Lena-Angara Plateau, part of the Central Siberian Plateau mountain system. It rises in the central/northeastern part of the plateau, above the right bank of the Kislaya River, west of the valley of the Khanda River, and northwest of Zhigalovo, in the central part of Irkutsk Oblast.

Mountaintops in the area of the plateau are flat and elevations moderate. The Namai is marked as a 1,509-metre-high (4,951 ft) summit in the N-48 sheet of the Soviet Topographic Map. This same mountain, however, is a 4,852-foot-high (1,479 m) peak in the E-8 sheet of the Defense Mapping Agency Navigation charts, and mentioned as a 1,464 meters (4,803 ft) high summit in the Great Soviet Encyclopedia.

== See also ==
- List of mountains and hills of Russia
