= Tayura =

River in Russia

Tayura Таюра
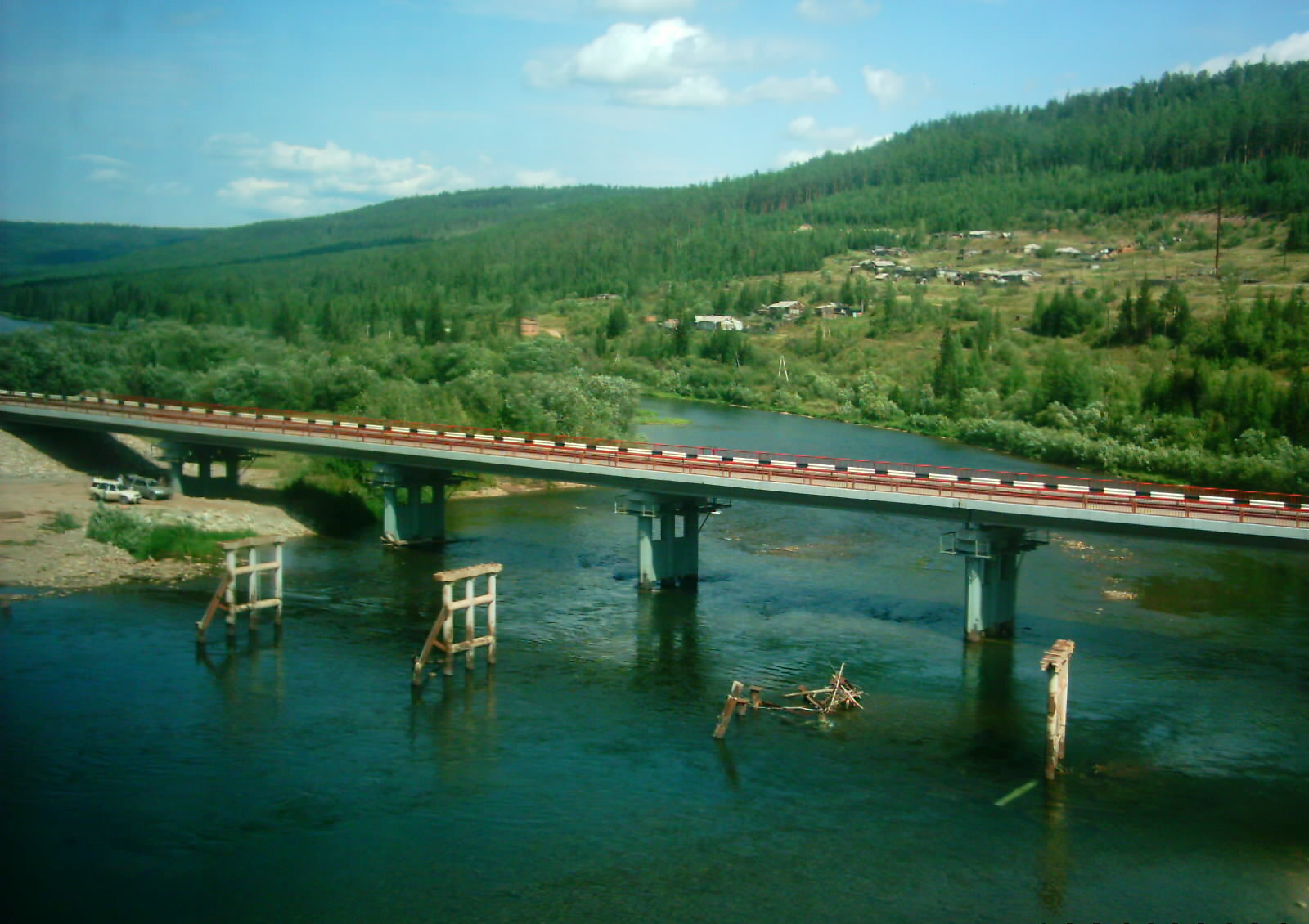
- Bridge over the Tayura near Zvyozdny

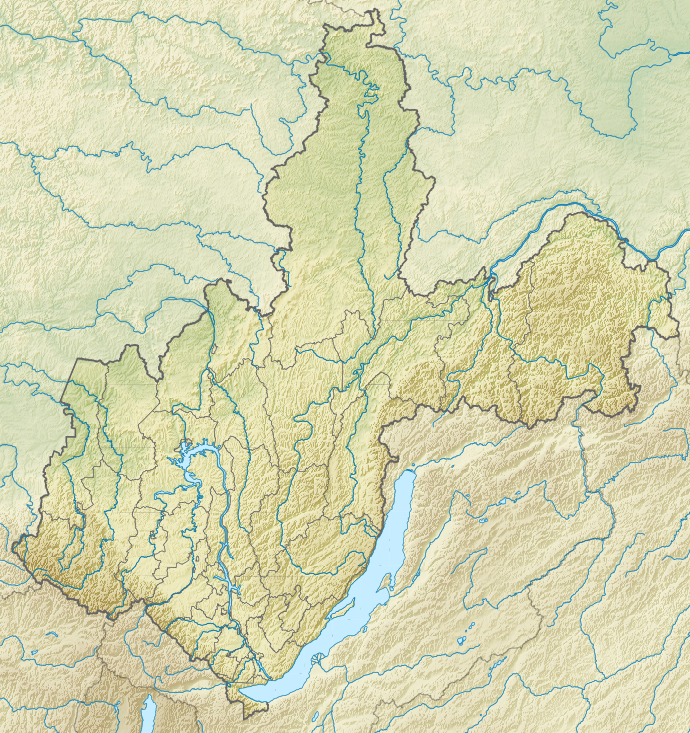
- Mouth location in Irkutsk Oblast, Russia

Location
- Country: Russia

Physical characteristics
- Source
  - location: Lena-Angara Plateau
  - coordinates: 55°53′02″N 106°44′40″E
  - elevation: 814 m (2,671 ft)
- Mouth: Lena
  - location: Near Ust-Kut
  - coordinates: 57°00′10″N 106°32′44″E
  - elevation: 269 m (883 ft)
- Length: 216 km (134 mi)
- Basin size: 5,720 km^{2} (2,210 sq mi)
- Discharge
  - average: 43.92 m^{3}/s (1,551 cu ft/s)

Basin features
- Progression: Lena→ Laptev Sea

The Tayura (Russian: Таюра) is a river in Irkutsk Oblast, Russia. It is a tributary of the Lena with a length of 216 kilometres (134 mi) and a drainage basin area of 5,720 square kilometres (2,210 mi^{2}). The river is crossed by the Baikal-Amur Mainline and the interregional highway 25K-258 Ust-Kut - Severobaikalsk.

The Tayura basin is one of the areas of Russia traditionally inhabited by Evenks. The abandoned Evenk settlement of Aitkan was located by the river, 22 kilometres (14 mi) east of Omoloy village on the Lena.

== Course ==
The Tayura is a right tributary of the Lena flowing to the north of Irkutsk. It has its sources in the northern part of the Lena-Angara Plateau at the confluence of the Left Tayura and Right Tayura, west of the valley of the Khanda (Kirenga). It flows northwards across mountainous territory and in its lower course roughly parallel to the Lena. Finally the Tayura meets the right bank of the Lena downstream from Ust-Kut, the administrative center of Ust-Kutsky District, 3,384 kilometres (2,103 mi) from its mouth.

The largest tributary of the Tayura is the 98 kilometres (61 mi) long Niya from the right. The river freezes between October and May. Summer floods are a frequent occurrence.

Basin of the Lena

== Flora and fauna ==
The vegetation of the Tayura river basin is characterized by the typical mountain taiga of the Lena-Angara Plateau. Permafrost is prevalent in the river basin.

== See also ==
- List of rivers of Russia
