= Znamenka =

Znamenka may refer to:

- Znamenka Street, a street in Moscow near the Kremlin
- Znamenka Palace, a residence of the Nikolaevichi branch of the Romanov family, in Saint Petersburg, Russia; see Grand Duke Peter Nikolaevich of Russia
- Znamenka, Russia (or Znamyonka), several inhabited localities in Russia
- Znamianka, Kirovohrad Oblast (Znamenka), a city in Kirovohrad Oblast, Ukraine
