= Zvyozdny, Irkutsk Oblast =

Zvyozdny Звёздный
- Urban-type settlement
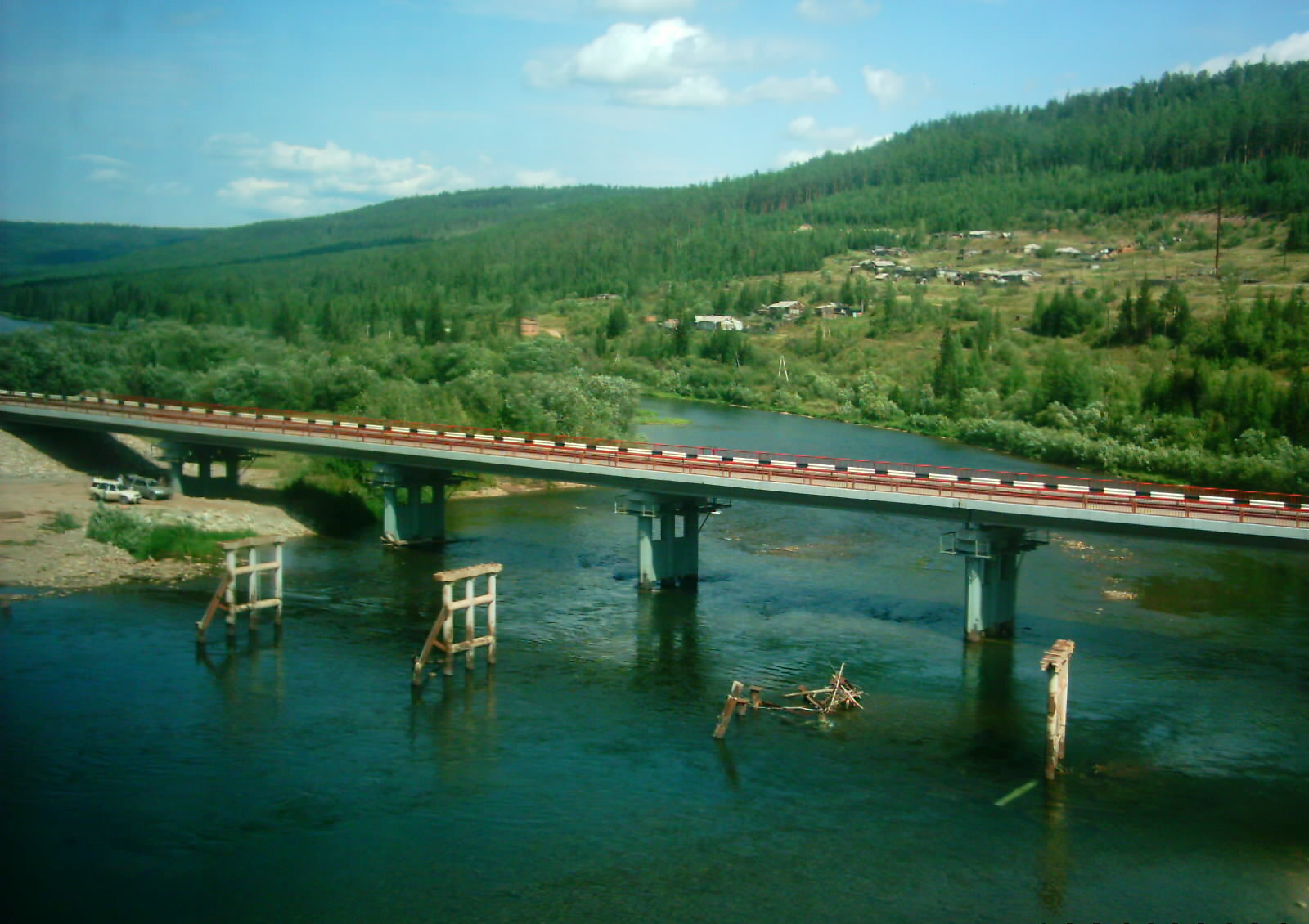
- Bridge over the Tayura near Zvyozdny.
- Interactive map of Zvyozdny
- Location of Zvyozdny Zvyozdny (Irkutsk Oblast)
- Coordinates: 56.7475°N 106.5045°E
- Country: Russia
- Federal subject: Irkutsk Oblast
- Administrative district: Ust-Kutsky District
- Founded: 1974

Population (2010 Census)
  - Total: 957
  - Estimate (2025): 748 (−21.8%)
- Time zone: UTC+8 (MSK+5)
- Postal code: 666762
- OKTMO ID: 25644154051

Zvyozdny (Russian: Звёздный) is an urban locality (an urban-type settlement) in Ust-Kutsky District of Irkutsk Oblast, Russia. Population: 957 (2010 census); 1,228 (2002 census); 2,894 (1989 Soviet census).

== Geography ==
Zvyozdny is located on the right bank of the mouth of the Niya River, a right tributary of the Tayura. The village lies 62 kilometres (39 mi) southeast of Ust-Kut, and 515 kilometres (320 mi) northeast of Irkutsk. Zvyozdny is crossed by the Baikal-Amur Mainline and the interregional highway 25K-258 Ust-Kut - Severobaikalsk.
