= Znamenka, Amur Oblast =

Znamenka Знаменка
- Selo
- Location within Amur Oblast Location within Russia
- Coordinates: 50°37′N 129°03′E
- Country: Russia
- Region: Amur Oblast
- District: Romnensky District
- Time zone: UTC+9:00

Znamenka (Russian: Знаменка) is a rural locality (a selo) and the administrative center of Znamensky Selsoviet of Romnensky District, Amur Oblast, Russia. The population was 421 as of 2018. There are 3 streets.

== Geography ==
Znamenka is located on the right bank of the Belaya River, 24 km southwest of Romny (the district's administrative centre) by road. Svyatorussovka is the nearest rural locality.
