= Zhigalovo =

Zhigalovo (Russian: Жигалово) is the name of several inhabited localities in Russia.

== Urban localities ==
- Zhigalovo, Irkutsk Oblast, a work settlement in Zhigalovsky District of Irkutsk Oblast

== Rural localities ==
- Zhigalovo, Moscow Oblast, a village in Lunevskoye Rural Settlement of Solnechnogorsky District of Moscow Oblast
- Zhigalovo, Pochinkovsky District, Smolensk Oblast, a village in Vaskovskoye Rural Settlement of Pochinkovsky District of Smolensk Oblast
- Zhigalovo, Velizhsky District, Smolensk Oblast, a village in Seleznevskoye Rural Settlement of Velizhsky District of Smolensk Oblast
- Zhigalovo, Vladimir Oblast, a village in Gus-Khrustalny District of Vladimir Oblast
