= Tutura =

River in Russia

Tutura Тутура
- Lena Basin with the Tutura in the lower left

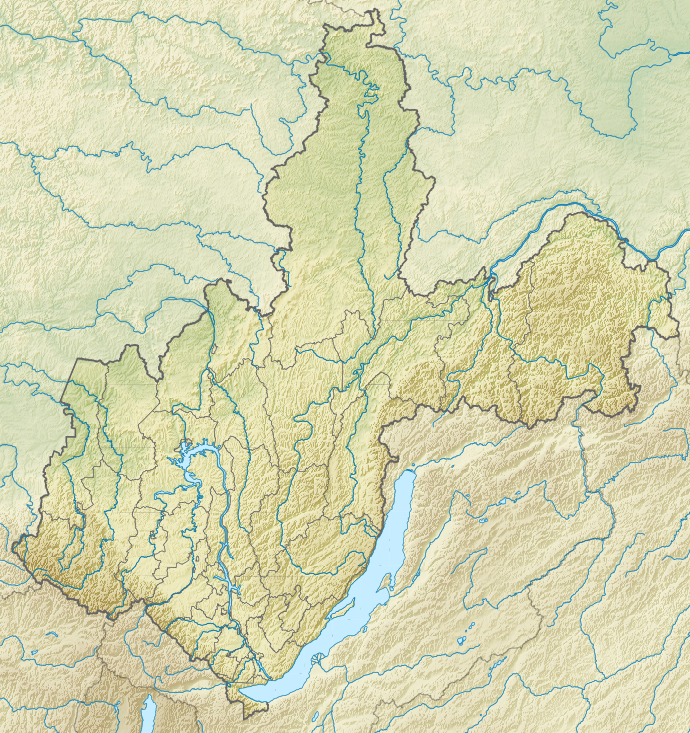
- Mouth location in Irkutsk Oblast, Russia

Location
- Country: Russia

Physical characteristics
- Source: Bolshoy Tutura Lake
  - location: Lena-Angara Plateau
  - coordinates: 54°25′54″N 105°01′52″E
  - elevation: 851 m (2,792 ft)
- Mouth: Lena
  - location: Zhigalovo
  - coordinates: 54°47′31″N 105°14′13″E
  - elevation: 421 m (1,381 ft)
- Length: 222 km (138 mi)
- Basin size: 7,300 km^{2} (2,800 sq mi)
- Discharge
  - average: 35 m^{3}/s (1,200 cu ft/s)

Basin features
- Progression: Lena→ Laptev Sea

The Tutura (Russian: Тутура) is a river in Irkutsk Oblast, Russia. It is a tributary of the Lena with a length of 222 kilometres (138 mi) and a drainage basin area of 7,300 square kilometres (2,800 mi^{2}).

The settlement of Chikan is located by the Tutura, near the confluence with the Chikan river, its main tributary. Other inhabited places near the river are Tutura and Kelora. The Tutura basin is one of the areas of Russia traditionally inhabited by Evenks.

== Course ==
The Tutura is a right tributary of the Lena which flows across the Lena-Angara Plateau. It has its sources in the Bolshoy Tutura Lake, Kachugsky District, to the NNE of Irkutsk. It flows first westwards, then in its middle course it heads in a roughly northern direction across the highland area. In its lower reaches its channel widens and near Chikan village it turns WSW, meandering across a floodplain. Finally the Tutura meets the right bank of the Lena by Zhigalovo, the administrative center of Zhigalovsky District, 3,812 kilometres (2,369 mi) from its mouth.

The largest tributaries of the Tutura are the 142 kilometres (88 mi) long Chikan and the 77 kilometres (48 mi) long Kelora from the right. The river freezes between October and May. Summer floods are a common occurrence.

== Flora and fauna ==
The vegetation of the Tutura river basin is characterized by mountain taiga. Permafrost is prevalent in the river basin. The main fish species in the river are carp, crucian carp, asp, pike, chub, lenok, whitefish, bream and Amur catfish.

== See also ==
- List of rivers of Russia
