= Zhigalovsky District =

Zhigalovsky District Жигаловский район (Russian)
- District
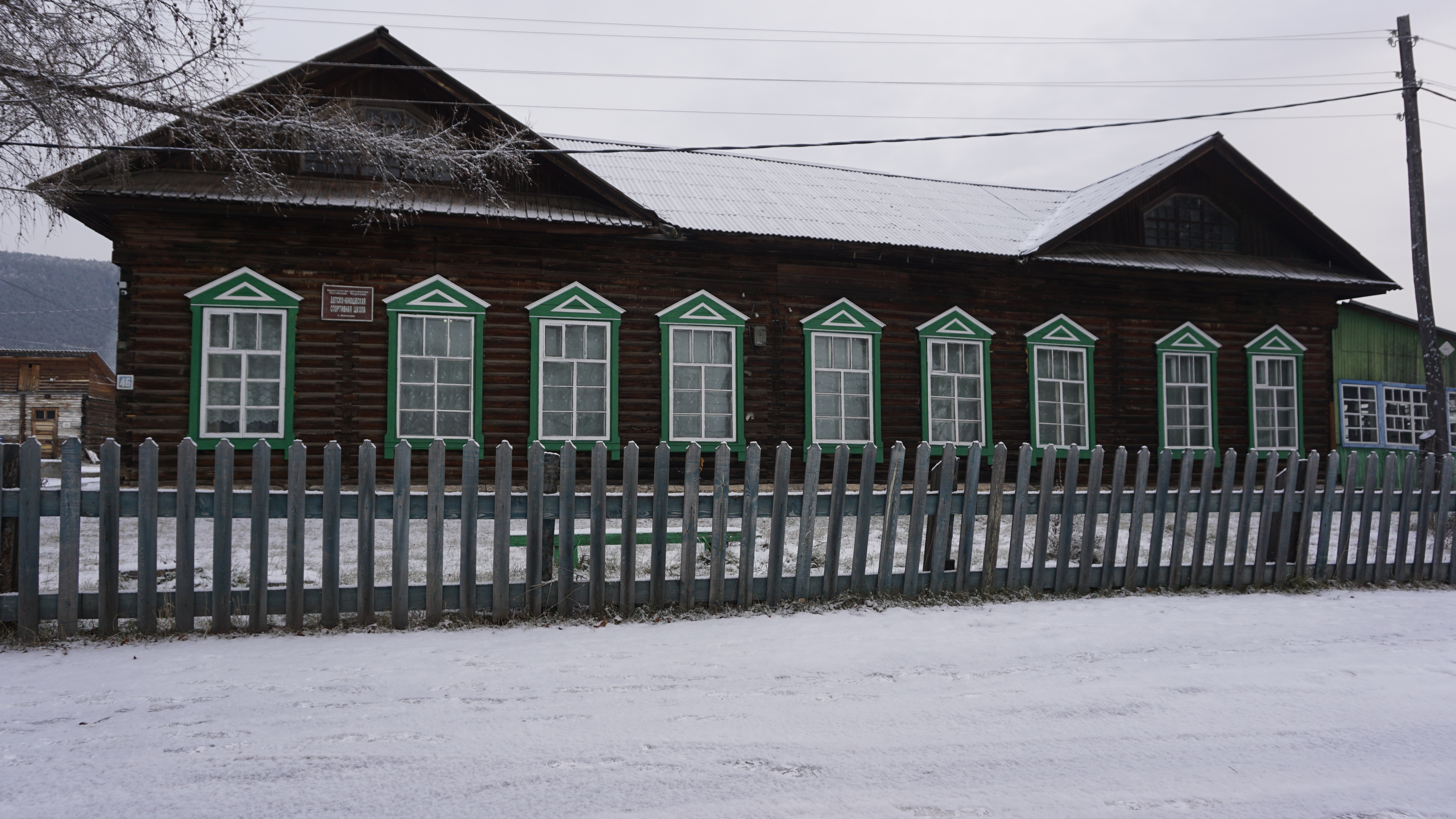
- Traditional building in Zhigalovo

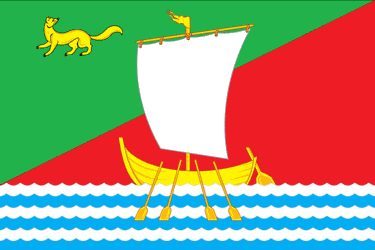
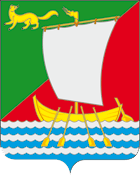
- Flag Coat of arms
- Location of Zhigalovsky District (#8) in central Irkutsk Oblast
- Coordinates: 54°49′N 105°09′E
- Country: Russia
- Federal subject: Irkutsk Oblast
- Established: 28 July 1926
- Administrative center: Zhigalovo

Area
  - Total: 22,640 km^{2} (8,740 sq mi)

Population (2010 Census)
  - Total: 9,340
  - Density: 0.413/km^{2} (1.07/sq mi)
  - Urban: 57.5%
  - Rural: 42.5%

Administrative structure
  - Inhabited localities: 1 urban-type settlements, 36 rural localities

Municipal structure
  - Municipally incorporated as: Zhigalovsky Municipal District
  - Municipal divisions: 1 urban settlements, 10 rural settlements
- Time zone: UTC+8 (MSK+5)
- OKTMO ID: 25606000
- Website: http://zhigalovo.irkobl.ru

Zhigalovsky District (Russian: Жига́ловский райо́н) is an administrative district, one of the thirty-three in Irkutsk Oblast, Russia. Municipally, it is incorporated as Zhigalovsky Municipal District. Its administrative center is the urban locality (a work settlement) of Zhigalovo. Population: 9,340 (2010 census); 10,408 (2002 Census); 11,043 (1989 Soviet census). The population of Zhigalovo accounts for 57.5% of the district's total population.

== Geography ==
The district is located in the Lena-Angara Plateau area. The Ilga and Tutura, tributaries of the Lena River, flow across it. The area of the district is 22,640 square kilometers (8,740 sq mi).

Some of the settlements of the district are Ust-Ilga (Усть-Илга), Konstantinovka (Константиновка), Lukinovo (Лукиново), Bachai (Бачай), Zakharova (Захарова), Timoshino (Тимошино), Butyrina (Бутырина), Kaidakan (Кайдакан), Chikan (Чикан), Tutura (Тутура), Kelora (Келора), Chichek (Чичек), Kachen (Качень), Rudovka (Рудовка), Znamenka (Знаменка), and Nizhnyaya Sloboda (Нижняя Слобода).
