= Star City =

Star City may refer to:

== Places ==
=== Canada ===
- Rural Municipality of Star City No. 428, Saskatchewan
  - Star City, Saskatchewan
- Star City, the original proposed name of Sewall, British Columbia

=== Chile ===
- Villa Las Estrellas, a permanently inhabited outpost and the larger one of only two civilian settlements in Antarctica

=== Russia ===
- Star City, Russia
- Yuri Gagarin Cosmonaut Training Center in Star City, Russia, also referred to metonymically as "Star City"

=== United States ===
- Star City, Arkansas
- Star City, Illinois
- Star City, Indiana
- Lafayette, Indiana, nicknamed "Star City"
- Presque Isle, Maine, nicknamed "Star City"
- Star City, Michigan
- Lincoln, Nebraska, nicknamed "Star City"
- Star City, Nevada
- Miamisburg, Ohio, whose motto is "Ohio's Star City"
- Roanoke, Virginia, nicknamed "Star City of the South"
- Star City, West Virginia

=== Fictional locations ===
- Star City (comics), a fictional city in DC comic books

== Facilities and structures ==
- Star City (amusement park), a theme park in Pasay, Philippines
- Star City (shopping mall), a shopping complex in Seoul, South Korea
- Star City, Birmingham, an entertainment complex in Birmingham, UK
- The Star, Sydney, or Star City Casino, a casino in Sydney, Australia

== Other uses ==
- Star City (TV series), a 2026 Apple TV+ series
- "Star City 2046", an episode of Legends of Tomorrow
- "Star City 2040", an episode of Arrow

== See also ==
- "City of Stars", a song from the 2016 film La La Land
- Star-shaped fortress, for fort-surrounded walled cities that are star fortifications
- City (disambiguation)
- Star (disambiguation), for municipalities named Star
