= Zvyozdny gorodok =

Zvyozdny gorodok may refer to:

- Zvyozdny gorodok (urban-type settlement), an urban-type settlement in Moscow Oblast, Russia
  - Zvyozdny gorodok Urban Okrug, the municipal formation this urban-type settlement is incorporated as
- Star City, Russia, a military research and space training facility in that urban-type settlement
  - Yuri Gagarin Cosmonaut Training Center, a training center in that facility
