= Novorossiyka, Mazanovsky District, Amur Oblast =

Novorossiyka Новороссийка
- Selo
- Location within Amur Oblast Location within Russia
- Coordinates: 52°08′N 129°27′E
- Country: Russia
- Region: Amur Oblast
- District: Mazanovsky District
- Time zone: UTC+9:00

Novorossiyka (Russian: Новороссийка) is a rural locality (a selo) and the administrative center of Novorossiysky Selsoviet of Mazanovsky District, Amur Oblast, Russia. The population was 278 as of 2018. There are 5 streets.

== Geography ==
Novorossiyka is located on the left bank of the Selemdzha River, 79 km northeast of Novokiyevsky Uval (the district's administrative centre) by road. Abaykan is the nearest rural locality.
