= Ilga (river) =

River in Russia

Ilga Илга
- Lena Basin with the Ilga in the lower left

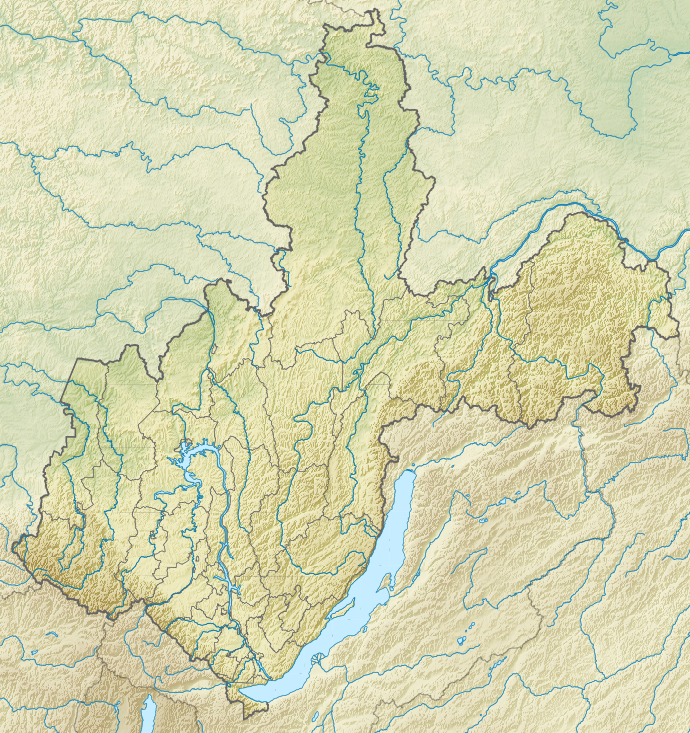
- Mouth location in Irkutsk Oblast, Russia

Location
- Country: Russia

Physical characteristics
- Source
  - location: Lena-Angara Plateau
  - coordinates: 53°26′39″N 105°01′52″E
  - elevation: 980 m (3,220 ft)
- Mouth: Lena
  - location: Ust-Ilga
  - coordinates: 55°0′12″N 105°04′58″E
  - elevation: 228 m (748 ft)
- Length: 289 km (180 mi)
- Basin size: 10,400 km^{2} (4,000 sq mi)
- Discharge
  - average: 34.7 m^{3}/s (1,230 cu ft/s)

Basin features
- Progression: Lena→ Laptev Sea

The Ilga (Russian: Илга) is a river in Irkutsk Oblast, Russia. It is the 32nd longest tributary of the Lena with a length of 289 kilometres (180 mi) and a drainage basin area of 10,400 square kilometres (4,000 mi^{2}).

There are a number of settlements near the river, such as Lukinovo (Лукиново), Bachai (Бачай), Zakharova (Захарова), Timoshino (Тимошино), Butyrina (Бутырина), Kaidakan (Кайдакан), Chichek (Чичек), Kachen (Качень), Znamenka (Знаменка), and Nizhnyaya Sloboda (Нижняя Слобода), mostly in Zhigalovsky District. Ust-Ilga is located by the Lena River at the confluence with the Ilga. In the summer tourists visit the Ilga mainly for rafting.

== Course ==
The Ilga is a left tributary of the Lena. It has its sources in the middle of the Lena-Angara Plateau, about 150 km (93 mi) to the north of Irkutsk. It flows in a roughly northern direction across the highland area as a mountain river among large boulders within a fairly straight channel. In its middle reaches it enters a wide floodplain where it forms meanders. Shortly before its confluence the Ilga bends and turns east. Finally the Ilga meets the left bank of the Lena by Ust-Ilga village 3,773 kilometres (2,344 mi) from its mouth.

The largest tributaries of the Ilga are the Ivda (Ilda) and Kichei from the right and the Typta and Tilik from the left. The river freezes between October and May. Permafrost is prevalent in the river basin.

== Flora and fauna ==
The vegetation of the Ilga river basin is characterized by dense mountain taiga, with spruce, fir and Siberian pine.

The main fish species in the river are dace, lenok, whitefish, taimen, chebak, grayling, pike, Arctic char, minnow and perch.

== See also ==
- List of rivers of Russia
