= Kuta (river) =

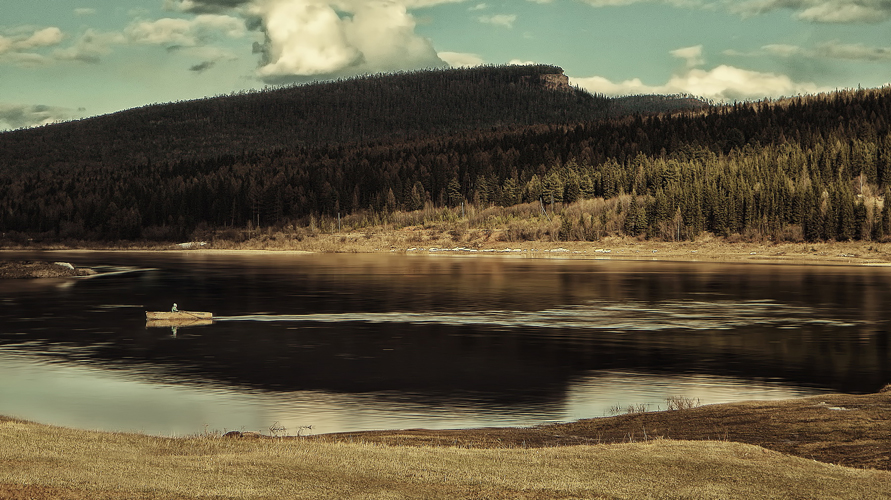
- View of the river

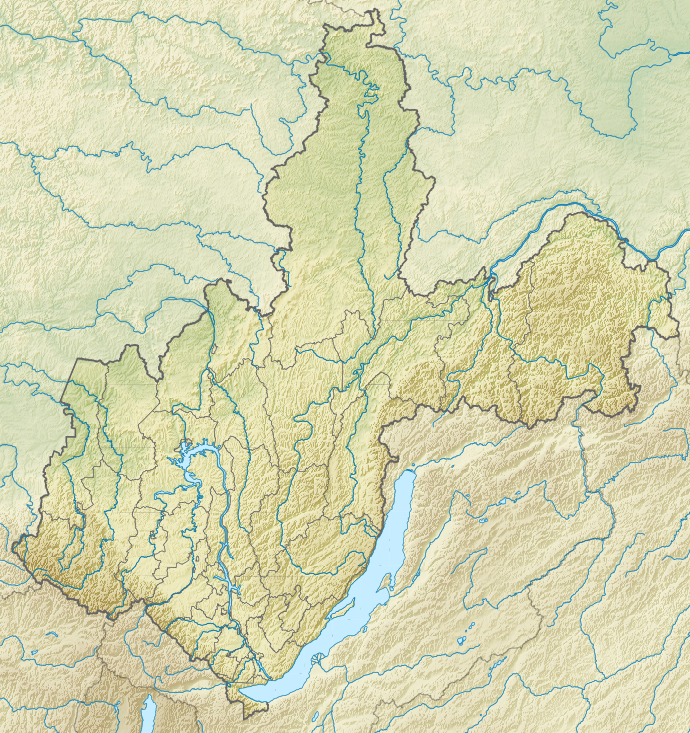
- Mouth location in Irkutsk Oblast, Russia

Physical characteristics
- Source: Lena-Angara Plateau
  - coordinates: 57°33′17″N 105°53′42″E
  - elevation: 650 m (2,130 ft)
- Mouth: Lena
  - location: Ust-Kut
  - coordinates: 56°45′15″N 105°39′25″E
  - elevation: 284 m (932 ft)
- Length: 408 km (254 mi)
- Basin size: 12,500 km^{2} (4,800 sq mi)

Basin features
- Progression: Lena→ Laptev Sea
- Tributaries
  - right: Kupa

The Kuta is a Siberian river north of Lake Baikal in Irkutsk Oblast, Russia, that flows into the Lena at Ust-Kut. With its right tributary, the Kupa, it forms a ‘T’ shape with the flat head pointing west and the point at Ust-Kut. The river is 408 kilometres (254 mi) long and its basin is about 12,500 square kilometres (4,800 mi^{2}).

== Course ==
Its source is about 650 metres (2,130 ft) above sea level and its mouth, 284 metres (932 ft). It flows first west and then south through the taiga and swampland of the Lena-Angara Plateau. At its juncture with the Kupa, it turns east and flows through a relatively narrow and deep valley to Ust-Kut. It is not navigable and is frozen from November to the middle of May. The upper course is practically uninhabited, but is used for forestry. The lower course has a few villages. The Baikal-Amur Mainline from Bratsk eastward runs along its north side for about 60 kilometres (37 mi). The next river to the west is the Ilim. In Cossack times a portage from the Ilim to the Kuta connected the Yenisei and Lena basins.

=== Tributaries ===
The Kupa is a right tributary that flows directly north and joins the Kuta where it turns east.

== See also ==
- Siberian River Routes
