= Znamenka, Yermekeyevsky District, Republic of Bashkortostan =

Znamenka Знаменка
- Selo
- Location within Bashkortostan Location within Russia
- Coordinates: 53°52′N 53°42′E
- Country: Russia
- Region: Bashkortostan
- District: Yermekeyevsky District
- Time zone: UTC+5:00

Znamenka (Russian: Знаменка) is a rural locality (a selo) in Vosmomartovsky Selsoviet, Yermekeyevsky District, Bashkortostan, Russia. The population was 45 as of 2010. There are 2 streets.

== Geography ==
Znamenka is located 38 km south of Yermekeyevo (the district's administrative centre) by road. Imeni 8 Marta is the nearest rural locality.
