= Zvyozdny, Volgograd Oblast =

Zvyozdny Звездный
- Settlement
- Location within Volgograd Oblast Location within Russia
- Coordinates: 48°48′N 44°55′E
- Country: Russia
- Region: Volgograd Oblast
- District: Sredneakhtubinsky District
- Time zone: UTC+4:00

Zvyozdny (Russian: Звездный) is a rural locality (a settlement) in Verkhnepogromenskoye Rural Settlement, Sredneakhtubinsky District, Volgograd Oblast, Russia. The population was 245 as of 2010. There are 3 streets.

== Geography ==
Zvyozdny is located 26 km northeast of Srednyaya Akhtuba (the district's administrative centre) by road. Volzhsky is the nearest rural locality.
