= Znamenka, Belebeyevsky District, Republic of Bashkortostan =

Znamenka Знаменка
- Selo
- Location within Bashkortostan Location within Russia
- Coordinates: 54°06′N 54°23′E
- Country: Russia
- Region: Bashkortostan
- District: Belebeyevsky District
- Time zone: UTC+5:00

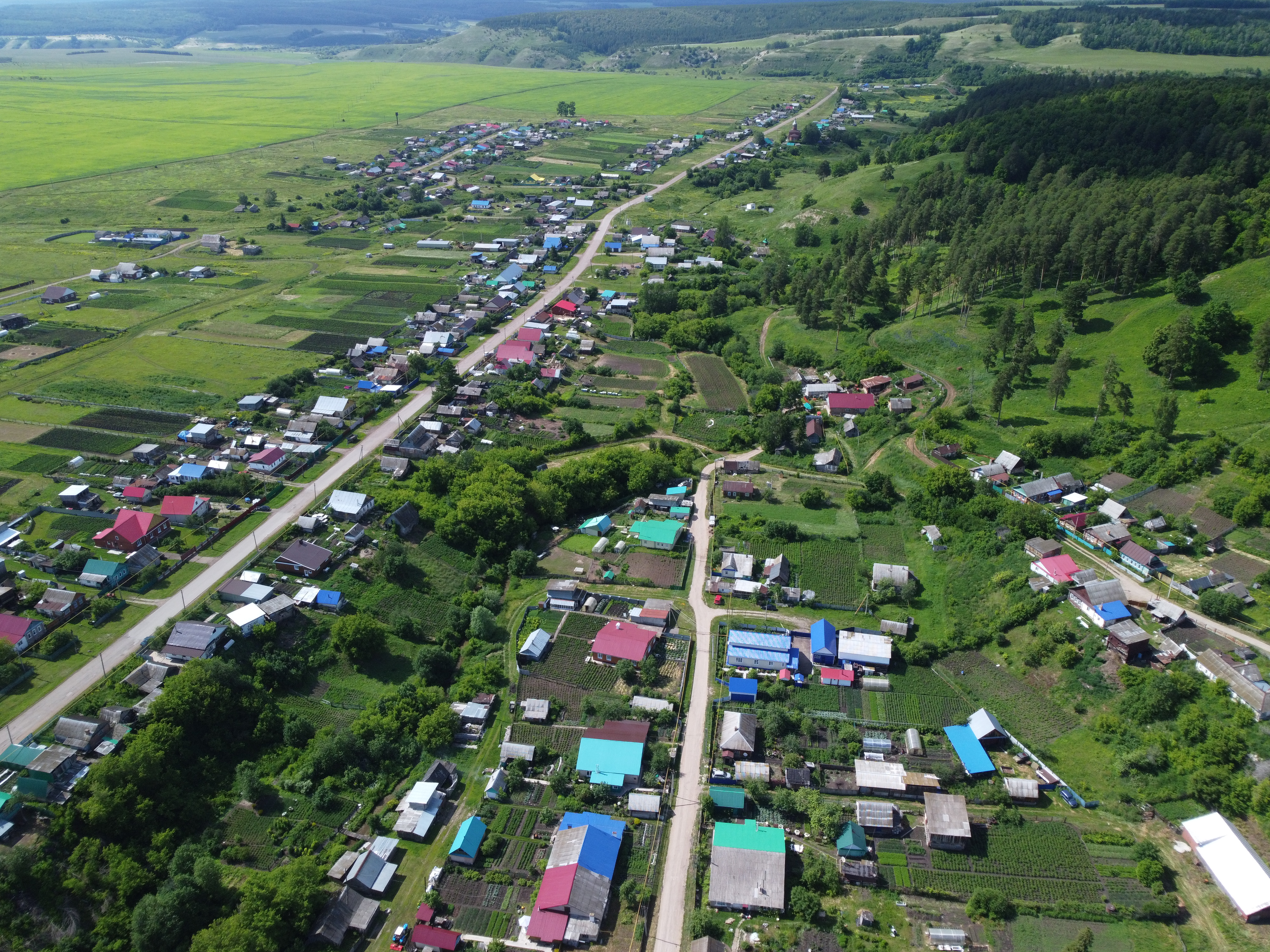

Znamenka (Russian: Знаменка) is a rural locality (a selo) and the administrative centre of Znamensky Selsoviet, Belebeyevsky District, Bashkortostan, Russia. The population was 1,879 as of 2010. There are 36 streets.

== Geography ==
Znamenka is located 37 km east of Belebey (the district's administrative centre) by road. Novokazanka is the nearest rural locality.
