= Znamenka, Znamensky District, Tambov Oblast =

Znamenka Знаменка
- Urban-type settlement
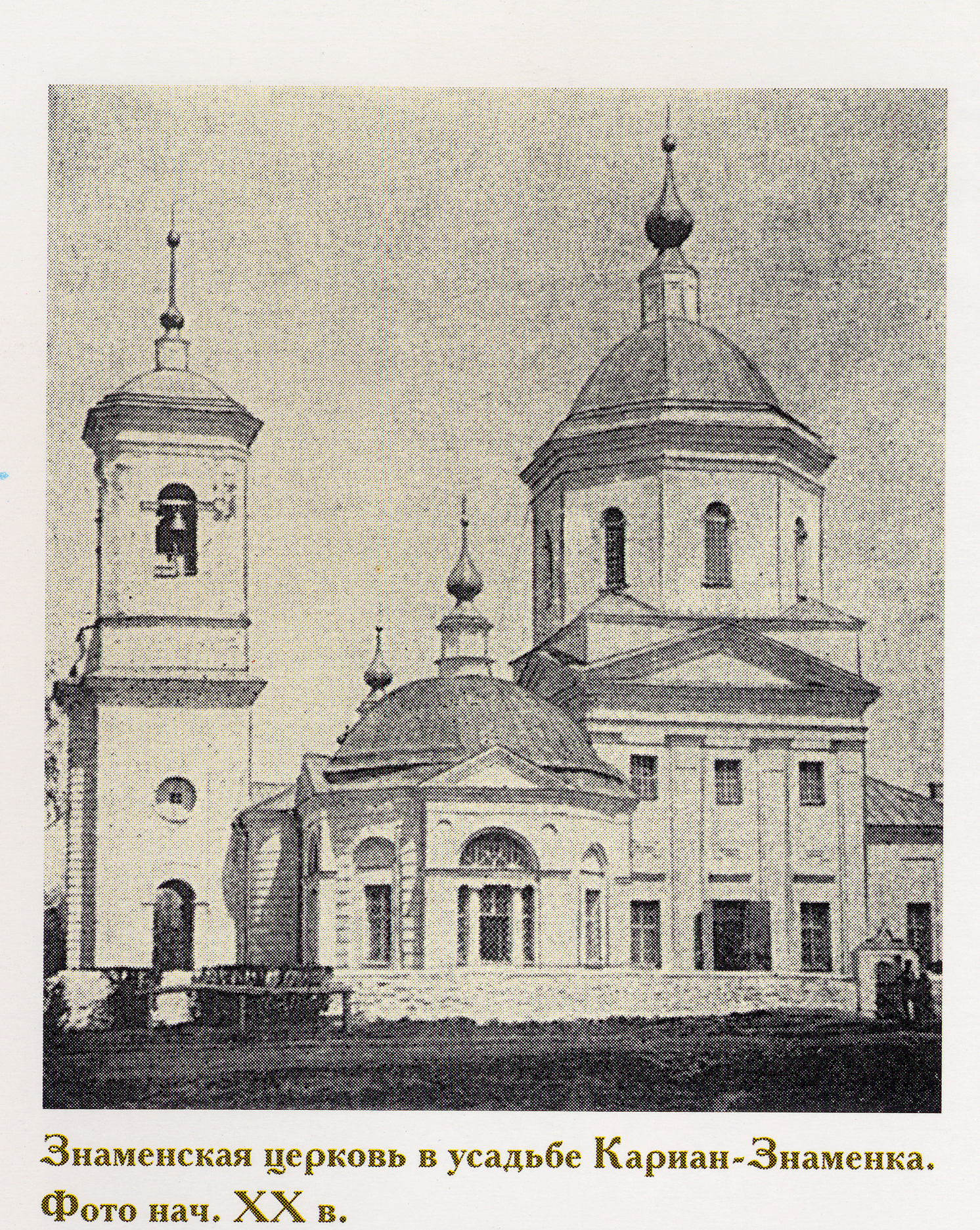

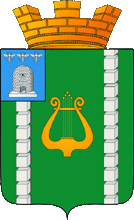
- Coat of arms
- Interactive map of Znamenka
- Location of Znamenka Znamenka (Tambov Oblast)
- Coordinates: 52.4119°N 41.4461°E
- Country: Russia
- Federal subject: Tambov Oblast
- Administrative district: Znamensky District
- Founded: 1700
- Elevation: 122 m (400 ft)

Population (2010 Census)
  - Total: 6,167
  - Estimate (2021): 5,525 (−10.4%)
- Time zone: UTC+3 (MSK)
- Postal code: 393401
- OKTMO ID: 68606151051

Znamenka (Russian: Знаменка) is an urban locality (an urban-type settlement) in Znamensky District of Tambov Oblast, Russia. Population: 6,167 (2010 census); 9,210 (2002 census); 9,540 (1989 Soviet census).

The name comes from the church built in 1745 in honor of the icon of the Banner of the Mother of God. However, the original name was Karian-Zagryazhskoye, then Karian-Znamenskoye, and only in 1918 the village was given the name Znamenka.
