= Znamenka, Talovsky District, Voronezh Oblast =

Znamenka Знаменка
- Selo
- Location within Voronezh Oblast Location within Russia
- Coordinates: 51°16′N 41°07′E
- Country: Russia
- Region: Voronezh Oblast
- District: Talovsky District
- Time zone: UTC+3:00

Znamenka (Russian: Знаменка) is a rural locality (a selo) in Abramovskoye Rural Settlement, Talovsky District, Voronezh Oblast, Russia. The population was 61 as of 2010.

== Geography ==
Znamenka is located 44 km northeast of Talovaya (the district's administrative centre) by road. Abramovka is the nearest rural locality.
