= Znamenka, Vladimir Oblast =

Znamenka Знаменка
- Village
- Location within Vladimir Oblast Location within Russia
- Coordinates: 55°49′N 41°36′E
- Country: Russia
- Region: Vladimir Oblast
- District: Selivanovsky District
- Time zone: UTC+3:00

Znamenka (Russian: Знаменка) is a rural locality (a village) in Malyshevskoye Rural Settlement, Selivanovsky District, Vladimir Oblast, Russia. The population was 12 as of 2010.

== Geography ==
Znamenka is located 12 km southwest of Krasnaya Gorbatka (the district's administrative centre) by road. Belkovo is the nearest rural locality.
