= Ust-Kutsky District =

Ust-Kutsky District Усть-Кутский район (Russian)
- District
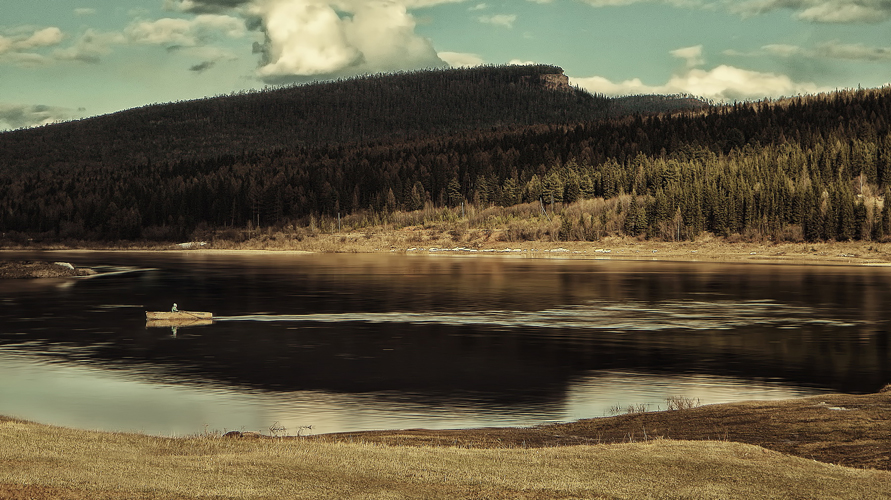
- Domashny Island in the Kuta River in Ust-Kutsky District

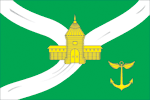
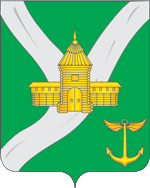
- Flag Coat of arms
- Location of Ust-Kutsky District in Irkutsk Oblast
- Coordinates: 56°48′N 105°50′E
- Country: Russia
- Federal subject: Irkutsk Oblast
- Established: 28 June 1926
- Administrative center: Ust-Kut

Area
  - Total: 34,600 km^{2} (13,400 sq mi)

Population (2010 Census)
  - Total: 8,416
  - Density: 0.243/km^{2} (0.630/sq mi)
  - Urban: 32.7%
  - Rural: 67.3%

Administrative structure
  - Inhabited localities: 1 cities/towns, 2 urban-type settlements, 17 rural localities

Municipal structure
  - Municipally incorporated as: Ust-Kutsky Municipal District
  - Municipal divisions: 3 urban settlements, 4 rural settlements
- Time zone: UTC+8 (MSK+5)
- OKTMO ID: 25644000
- Website: https://admin-ukmo.ru

Population of Ust-Kutsky District
- 2010 Census: 8,416
- 2002 Census: 10,765
- 1989 Census: 20,704
- 1979 Census: 16,567

Ust-Kutsky District (Russian: Усть-Ку́тский райо́н) is an administrative district, one of the thirty-three in Irkutsk Oblast, Russia. Municipally, it is incorporated as Ust-Kutsky Municipal District. It is located in the center of the oblast. Its administrative center is the town of Ust-Kut. As of the 2010 Census, the total population of the district (excluding the administrative center) was 8,416.

== Administrative and municipal status ==
Within the framework of administrative divisions, Ust-Kutsky District is one of the thirty-three in the oblast. The town of Ust-Kut serves as its administrative center. As a municipal division, the district is incorporated as Ust-Kutsky Municipal District.

== Geography ==
The district is located in the Lena-Angara Plateau area. The Kuta and Tayura, tributaries of the Lena River, flow across it. The area of the district is 34,600 square kilometers (13,400 sq mi).
