= Znamenka, Starooskolsky District, Belgorod Oblast =

Znamenka Знаменка
- Selo
- Location within Belgorod Oblast Location within Russia
- Coordinates: 51°11′N 38°16′E
- Country: Russia
- Region: Belgorod Oblast
- District: Starooskolsky District
- Time zone: UTC+3:00

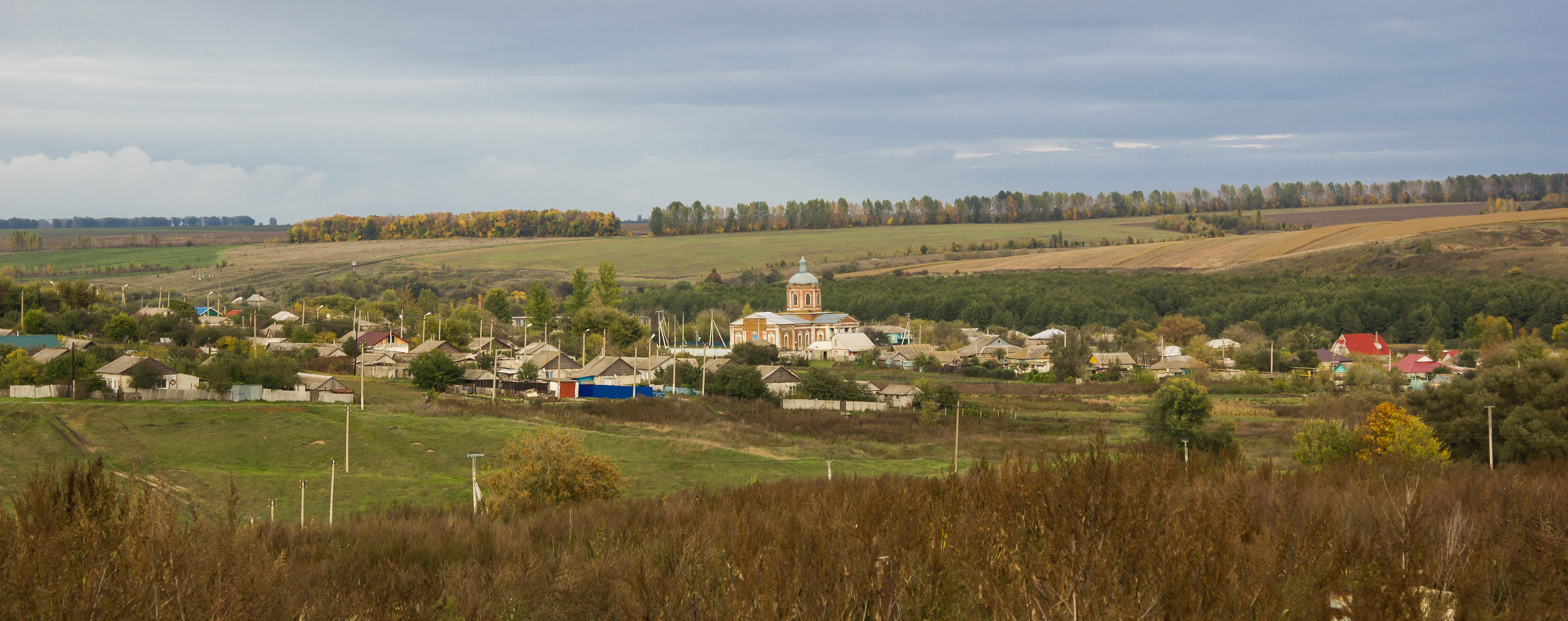
Znamenskaya Church (Belgorod region, Stary Oskol, Znamenka village)

Znamenka (Russian: Знаменка) is a rural locality (a selo) in Starooskolsky District, Belgorod Oblast, Russia. The population was 357 as of 2010. There are 8 streets.

== Geography ==
Znamenka is located 42 km southeast of Stary Oskol (the district's administrative centre) by road. Sergeyevka is the nearest rural locality.
