= Znamenka, Kuyurgazinsky District, Republic of Bashkortostan =

Znamenka Знаменка
- Village
- Location within Bashkortostan Location within Russia
- Coordinates: 52°43′N 56°01′E
- Country: Russia
- Region: Bashkortostan
- District: Kuyurgazinsky District
- Time zone: UTC+5:00

Znamenka (Russian: Знаменка) is a rural locality (a village) in Krivle-Ilyushkinsky Selsoviet, Kuyurgazinsky District, Bashkortostan, Russia. The population was 88 as of 2010. There are 3 streets.

== Geography ==
Znamenka is located 22 km east of Yermolayevo (the district's administrative centre) by road. Novoyamashevo is the nearest rural locality.
