= Znamenka, Zabaykalsky Krai =

Znamenka Знаменка
- Selo
- Location within Zabaykalsky Krai Location within Russia
- Coordinates: 52°10′N 116°17′E
- Country: Russia
- Region: Zabaykalsky Krai
- District: Nerchinsky District
- Time zone: UTC+9:00

Znamenka (Russian: Знаменка) is a rural locality (a selo) in Nerchinsky District, Zabaykalsky Krai, Russia. Population: 719 (2021 census); 796 (2010 census); 906 (2002 census); There are 9 streets in this selo.

== Geography ==
This rural locality is located 31 km from Nerchinsk (the district's administrative centre), 191 km from Chita (capital of Zabaykalsky Krai) and 5,379 km from Moscow. Severnaya Znamenka is the nearest rural locality.
