= Znamenka, Altai Krai =

Znamenka Знаменка
- Selo
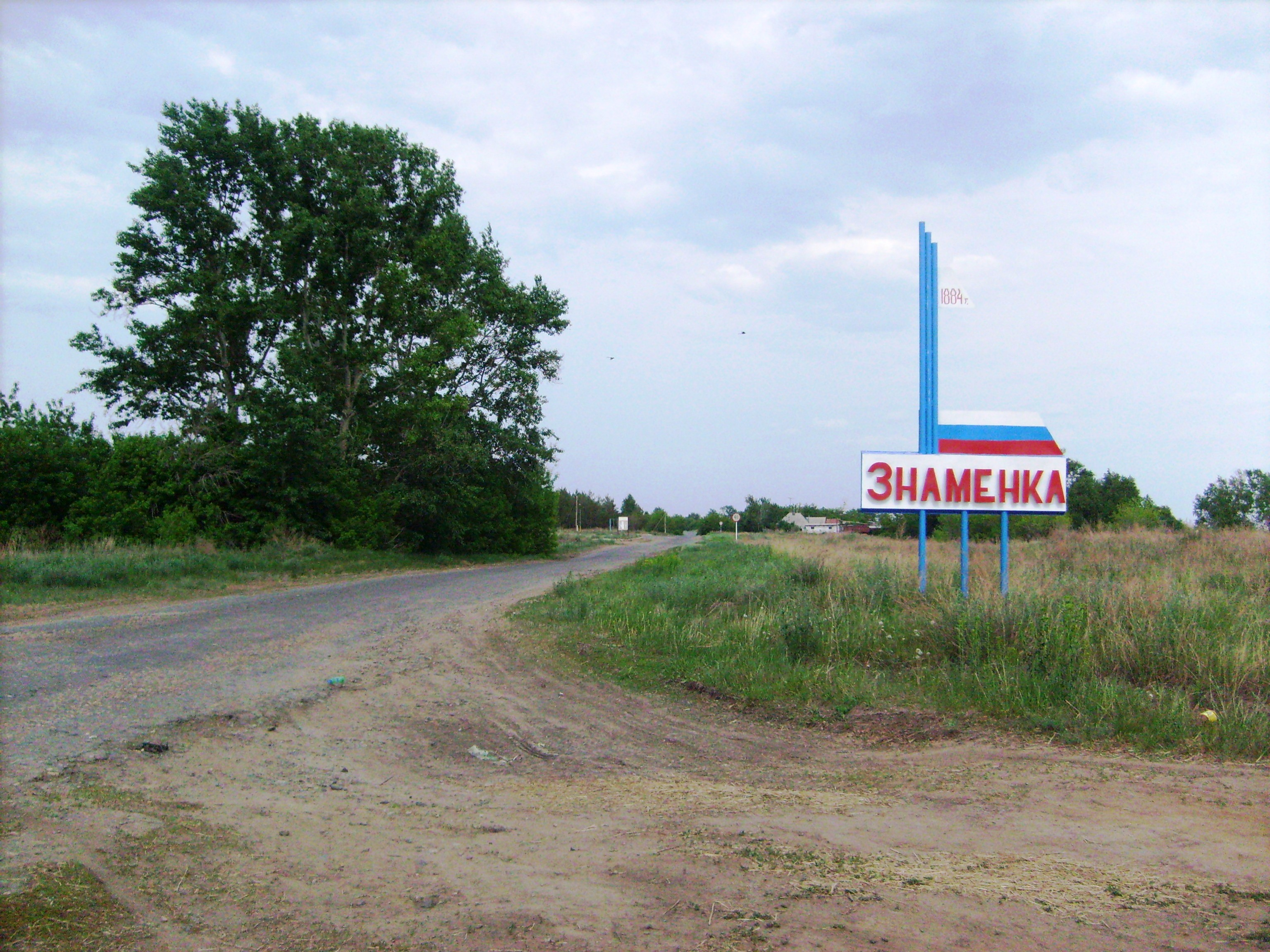

- Location within Altai Krai Location within Russia
- Coordinates: 53°09′N 79°28′E
- Country: Russia
- Region: Altai Krai
- District: Slavgorod
- Time zone: UTC+7:00

Znamenka (Russian: Знаменка) is a rural locality (a selo) in Slavgorod, Altai Krai, Russia. The population was 1,163 as of 2013. There are 20 streets.
