= Ust-Kut =

Town in Irkutsk Oblast, Russia

Ust-Kut Усть-Кут
- Town
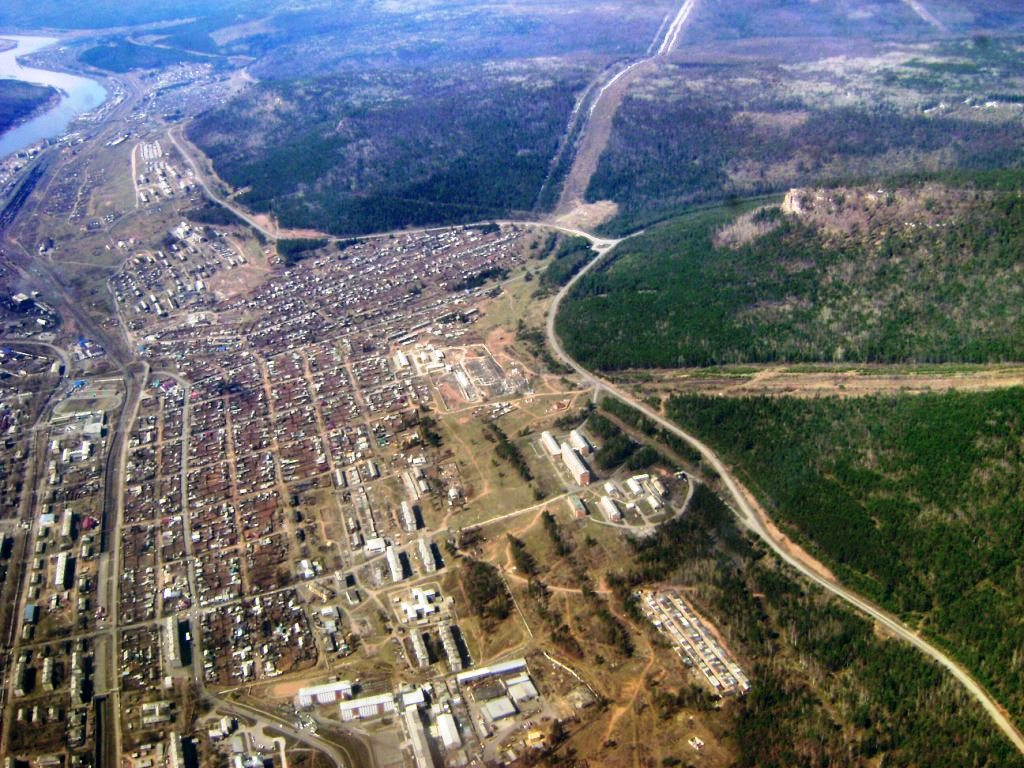
- Aerial view of Ust-Kut

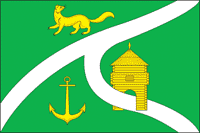
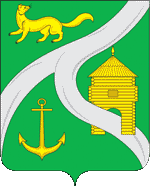
- Flag Coat of arms
- Interactive map of Ust-Kut
- Location of Ust-Kut Ust-Kut (Irkutsk Oblast)
- Coordinates: 56°47′N 105°38′E
- Country: Russia
- Federal subject: Irkutsk Oblast
- Administrative district: Ust-Kutsky District
- Founded: 1631
- Town status since: 1954

Government
  - Head: Vladimir Krivonosenko
- Elevation: 300 m (980 ft)

Population (2010 Census)
  - Total: 45,375
  - Estimate (2021): 36,918 (−18.6%)

Administrative status
  - Capital of: Ust-Kutsky District

Municipal status
  - Municipal district: Ust-Kutsky Municipal District
  - Urban settlement: Ust-Kutskoye Urban Settlement
  - Capital of: Ust-Kutsky Municipal District, Ust-Kutskoye Urban Settlement
- Time zone: UTC+8 (MSK+5)
- Postal codes: 666781-666788, 666793
- Dialing code: +7 39565
- OKTMO ID: 25644101001
- Website: www.admustkut.ru

Ust-Kut (Russian: Усть-Кут) is a town and the administrative center of Ust-Kutsky District in Irkutsk Oblast, Russia, located 961 kilometers (597 mi) from Irkutsk, the administrative center of the oblast. Located on a western loop of the Lena River, the town spreads out for over 20 kilometers (12 mi) along the left bank, near the point where the Kuta River joins from the west. Population: 45,375 (2010 census); 49,951 (2002 census); 61,165 (1989 Soviet census).

== Etymology ==
The town's name means "the mouth of the Kuta River" in Russian, with the name "Kuta" coming from an Evenk word meaning "peat bog".

== Geography ==
The town is located in the Lena-Angara Plateau.

== History ==
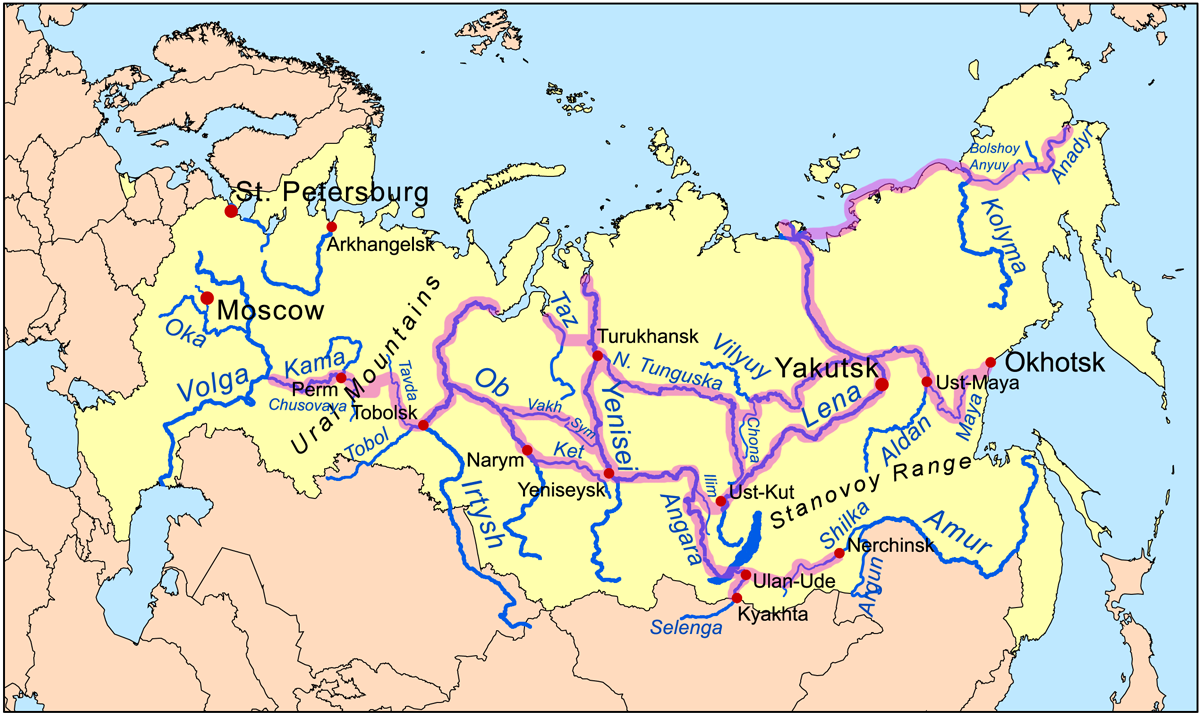
Ust-Kut was on a portage between the Yenisei and Lena Rivers

It was founded in 1631 by Siberian Cossack ataman Ivan Galkin, who built an ostrog (fort) there. The fort's military importance declined in the latter half of the 17th century; however, the settlement was increasingly important as a river port, becoming one of the main starting points for trade along the Lena.

Mineral springs to the west of the town were reportedly discovered as early as the 17th century by Yerofey Khabarov and a spa was built at the site in 1925.

In the early 20th century Ust-Kut served as a destination for political exiles, most notably Leon Trotsky.

In 1951, the railway from Tayshet reached Ust-Kut. The town thus became the first and only river port on the Lena served by the railway and an important railhead through which cargoes could travel to and from the locations along the Lena, such as most of Yakutia. Ust-Kut was granted town status in 1954, with the merger of the original settlement of Ust-Kut and the river port suburb of Osetrovo.

Ust-Kut remained the end of the line until 1974, when construction work started to extend the railway, now known as the Baikal–Amur Mainline, east toward Lake Baikal and beyond. The town became the headquarters of the construction of the western section of the BAM.

== Administrative and municipal status ==
Within the framework of administrative divisions, Ust-Kut serves as the administrative center of Ust-Kutsky District, to which it is directly subordinated. As a municipal division, the town of Ust-Kut, together with the selo of Turuka in Ust-Kutsky District, is incorporated within Ust-Kutsky Municipal District as Ust-Kutskoye Urban Settlement.

== Economy and infrastructure ==
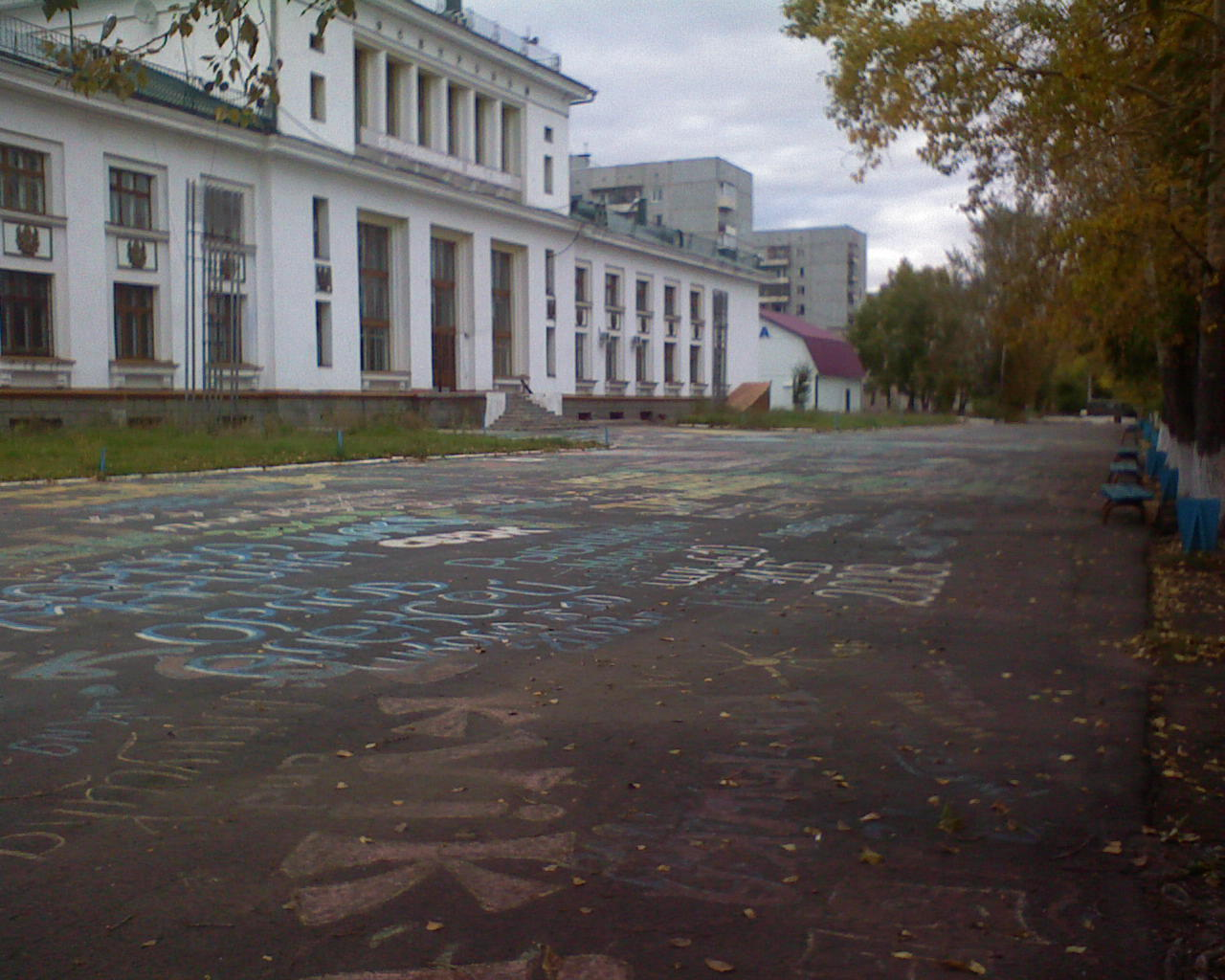
River station at Osetrovo on the Lena River

Ust-Kut's economy relies mainly on its position as a transport hub, with the connection of road and rail transport with river traffic on the Lena. During the summer months, passenger ferries depart downriver from Ust-Kut to Yakutsk and Tiksi. There is a road bridge over the river in Ust-Kut.

There are also shipyards and food production in the town.

Ust-Kut is spread along the Baikal–Amur Mainline with multiple stations, including the smaller Ust-Kut station and the actual main station Lena near the river port in Osetrovo. At the small settlement of Yakurim a few kilometers further, the railway crosses the Lena via a 500-meter (1,600 ft) bridge, the last bridge across the river for its entire length.

The town is served by the Ust-Kut Airport, located 9 kilometers (5.6 mi) northwest of the town center.
