= Zhigalovo, Irkutsk Oblast =

Zhigalovo Жигалово
- Work settlement
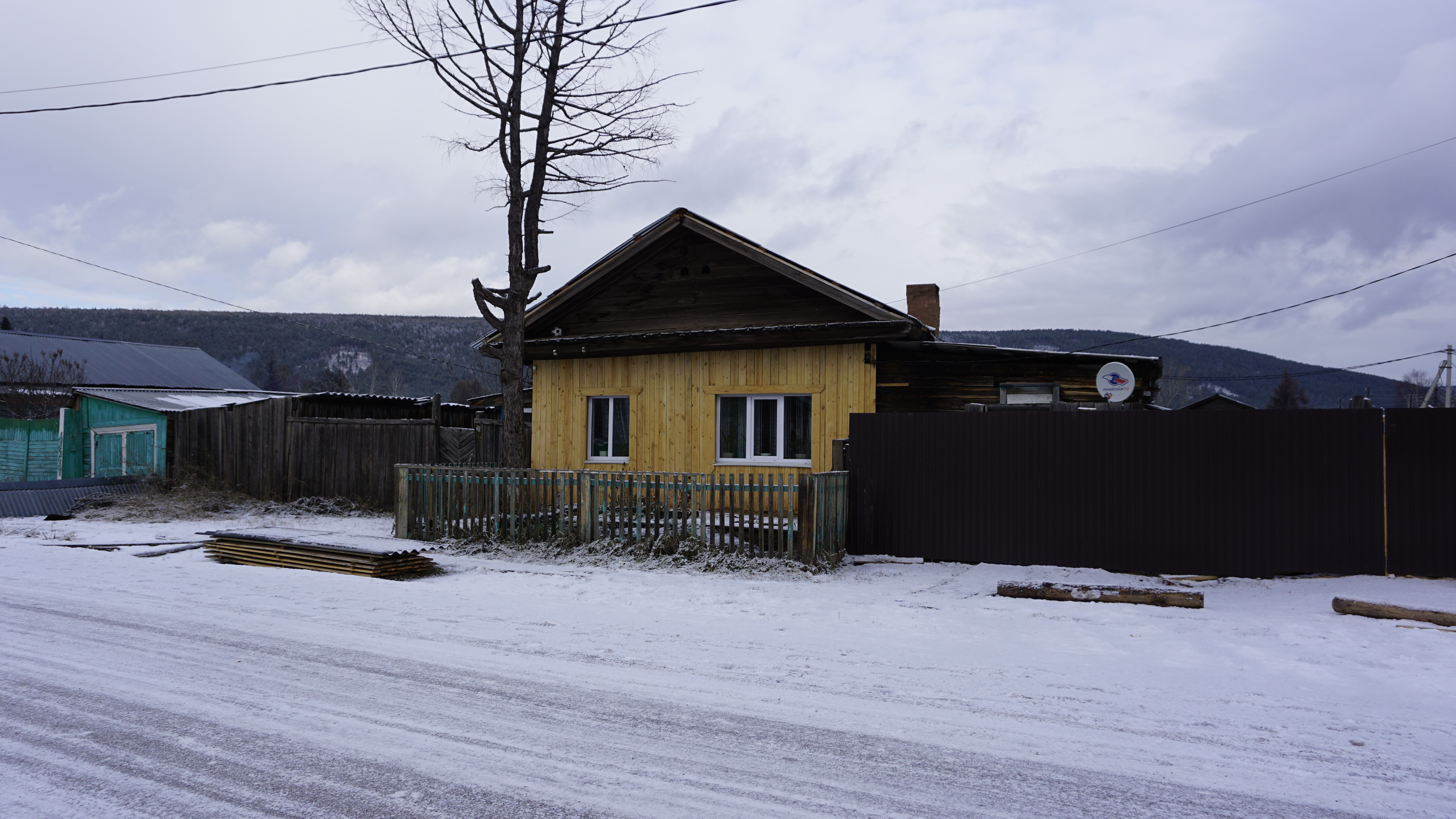
- House in Zhigalovo

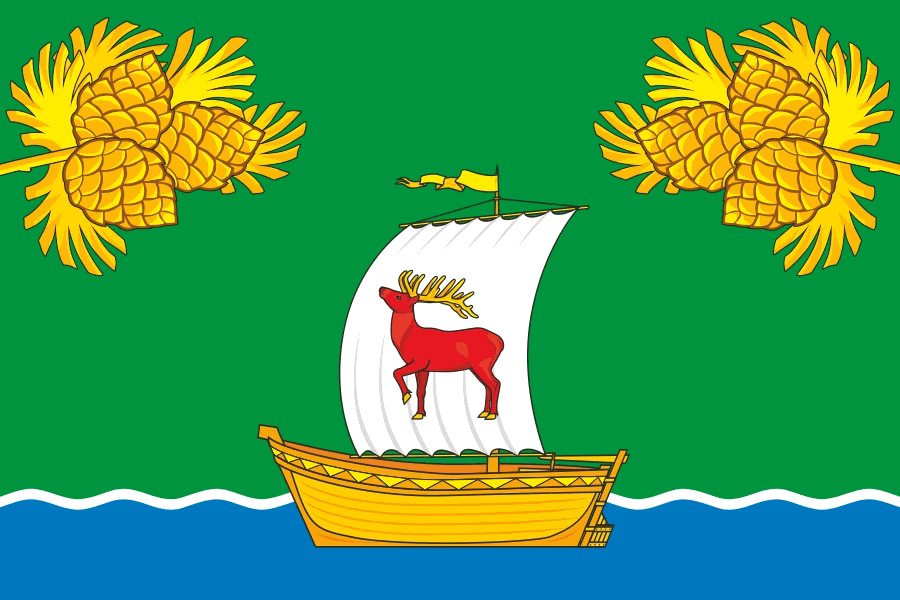
- Flag
- Interactive map of Zhigalovo
- Location of Zhigalovo Zhigalovo (Irkutsk Oblast)
- Coordinates: 54°48′N 105°10′E
- Country: Russia
- Federal subject: Irkutsk Oblast
- Administrative district: Zhigalovsky District
- Founded: 1723

Population (2010 Census)
  - Total: 5,369
  - Estimate (2025): 5,361 (−0.1%)

Administrative status
  - Capital of: Zhigalovsky District
- Time zone: UTC+8 (MSK+5)
- Postal code: 666400
- OKTMO ID: 25606151051

Zhigalovo (Russian: Жигалово) is an urban locality (a work settlement) and the administrative center of Zhigalovsky District of Irkutsk Oblast, Russia. Population: 5,369 (2010 census); 5,412 (2002 census); 5,663 (1989 Soviet census).

== Geography ==
The settlement is located in the Lena-Angara Plateau, on the left bank of the Lena River at its confluence with the Tutura.

== Transportation ==
Zhigalovo is served by the Zhigalovo Airport.

== Climate ==
Zhigalovo has a monsoonal subarctic climate (Köppen climate classification Dwc) with severely cold winters and warm summers. Precipitation is quite low, but is much higher in summer than at other times of the year.

Climate data for Zhigalovo
| Month | Jan | Feb | Mar | Apr | May | Jun | Jul | Aug | Sep | Oct | Nov | Dec | Year |
|---|---|---|---|---|---|---|---|---|---|---|---|---|---|
| Record high °C (°F) | 0.1 (32.2) | 8.7 (47.7) | 15.6 (60.1) | 24.5 (76.1) | 33.9 (93.0) | 36.9 (98.4) | 37.1 (98.8) | 36.3 (97.3) | 31.2 (88.2) | 24.7 (76.5) | 7.5 (45.5) | 3.9 (39.0) | 37.1 (98.8) |
| Mean daily maximum °C (°F) | −21.8 (−7.2) | −15.2 (4.6) | −2.7 (27.1) | 7.0 (44.6) | 16.3 (61.3) | 23.4 (74.1) | 25.6 (78.1) | 22.3 (72.1) | 14.3 (57.7) | 4.2 (39.6) | −9.5 (14.9) | −19.4 (−2.9) | 3.7 (38.7) |
| Daily mean °C (°F) | −27.8 (−18.0) | −23.7 (−10.7) | −12.9 (8.8) | −0.7 (30.7) | 7.8 (46.0) | 14.7 (58.5) | 17.6 (63.7) | 14.4 (57.9) | 6.6 (43.9) | −2.2 (28.0) | −15.1 (4.8) | −24.7 (−12.5) | −3.8 (25.1) |
| Mean daily minimum °C (°F) | −33.3 (−27.9) | −30.7 (−23.3) | −21.5 (−6.7) | −7.5 (18.5) | −0.3 (31.5) | 6.6 (43.9) | 10.8 (51.4) | 8.6 (47.5) | 1.4 (34.5) | −6.9 (19.6) | −20.2 (−4.4) | −30.0 (−22.0) | −10.3 (13.5) |
| Record low °C (°F) | −54.4 (−65.9) | −53.1 (−63.6) | −47.4 (−53.3) | −34.8 (−30.6) | −15.6 (3.9) | −11.5 (11.3) | −1.5 (29.3) | −2.8 (27.0) | −12.9 (8.8) | −33.7 (−28.7) | −46.7 (−52.1) | −53.1 (−63.6) | −54.4 (−65.9) |
| Average precipitation mm (inches) | 12.9 (0.51) | 7.6 (0.30) | 6.1 (0.24) | 10.9 (0.43) | 22.4 (0.88) | 47.5 (1.87) | 72.9 (2.87) | 74.1 (2.92) | 36.7 (1.44) | 16.8 (0.66) | 16.2 (0.64) | 16.9 (0.67) | 341 (13.43) |
| Average precipitation days (≥ 0.1 mm) | 18.9 | 14.6 | 12.0 | 10.2 | 10.1 | 10.2 | 9.9 | 12.2 | 13.7 | 16.1 | 18.8 | 19.1 | 165.8 |
| Average relative humidity (%) | 79.5 | 77.1 | 72.3 | 62.5 | 58.8 | 69.0 | 73.9 | 77.7 | 79.4 | 78.7 | 82.3 | trace | 67.6 |
| Mean monthly sunshine hours | 71.3 | 109.2 | 182.9 | 228.0 | 266.6 | 243.0 | 235.6 | 213.9 | 147.0 | 102.3 | 66.0 | 49.6 | 1,915.4 |
Source: climatebase.ru (1948-2011)
