= Lena–Angara Plateau =

Plateau in Siberia, Russia

Lena-Angara Plateau
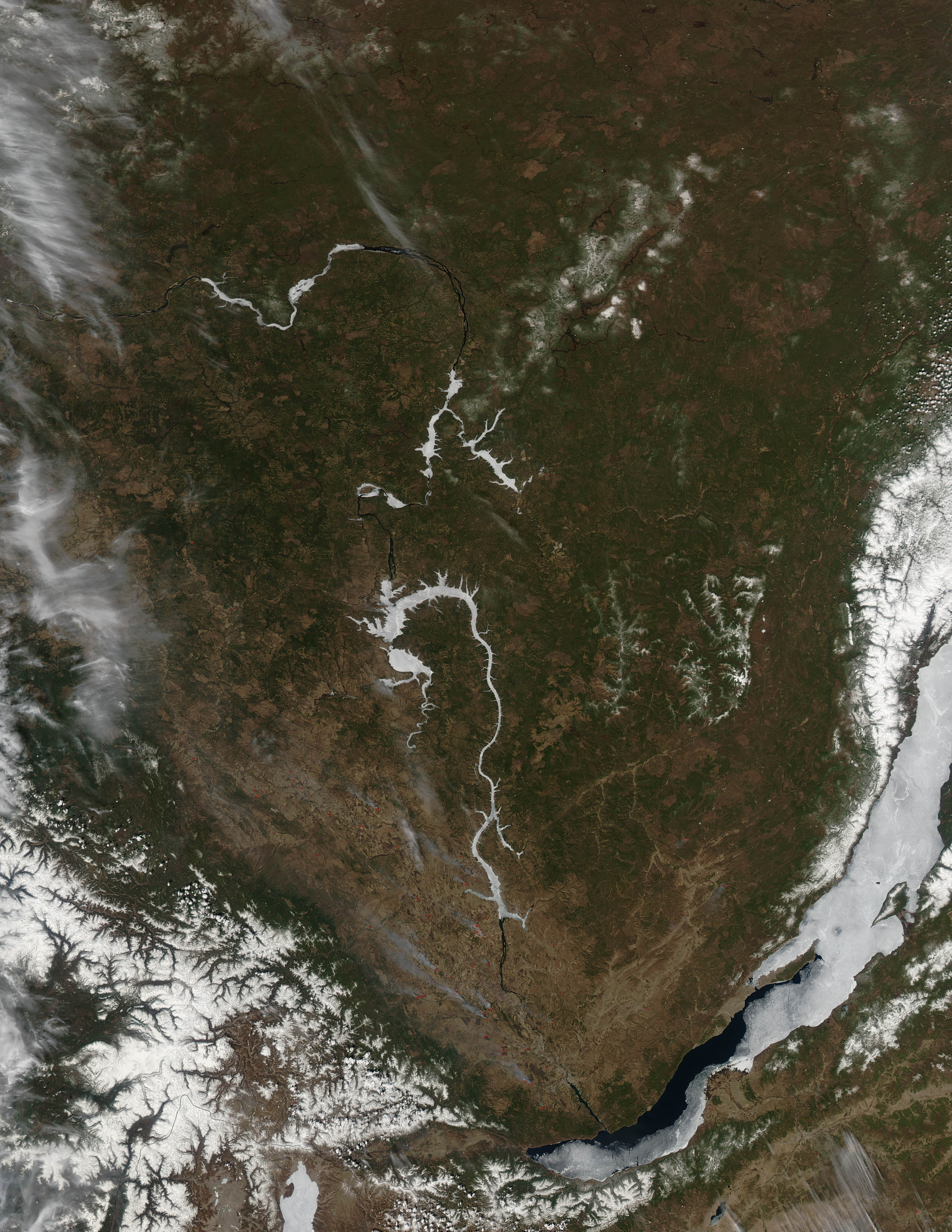
- Satellite picture of the Irkutsk-Cheremkhovo Plain and the Lena-Angara Plateau

Highest point
- Peak: Namai
- Elevation: 1,509 m (4,951 ft)
- Coordinates: 55°29′58.45″N 106°42′12.64″E

Dimensions
- Length: 600 km (370 mi)
- Width: 380 km (240 mi)
- Area: 20,000 km^{2} (7,700 mi^{2})

Naming
- Native name: Лено-Ангарское плато

Geography
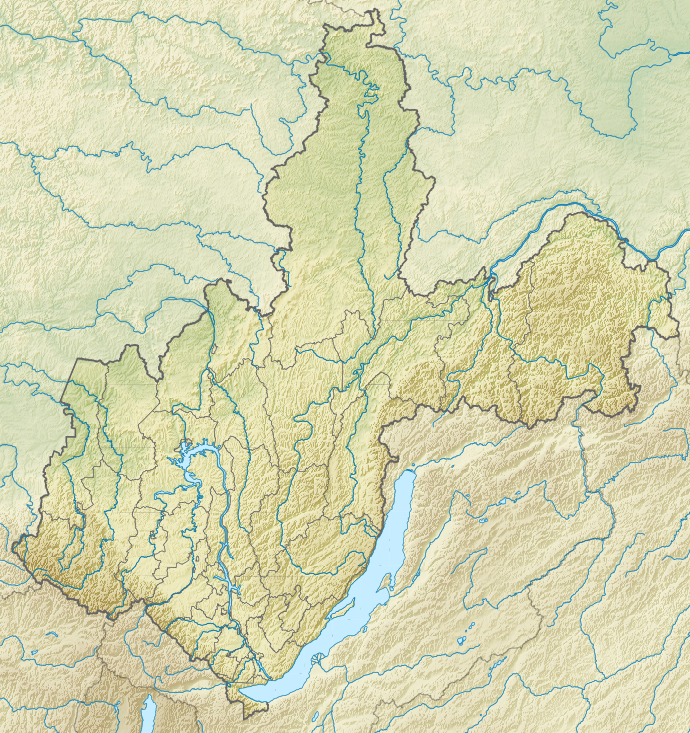
- Location within Irkutsk Oblast
- Country: Russia
- Federal subject: Irkutsk Oblast
- Range coordinates: 55°30′N 105°0′E
- Parent range: Central Siberian Plateau

Geology
- Rock ages: Cambrian and Ordovician
- Rock type(s): Limestone, dolomite, sandstone

The Lena-Angara Plateau (Russian: Лено-Ангарское плато), is a plateau in Siberia. Administratively it is in the Irkutsk Oblast, Russian Federation. The plateau is named after the Lena and Angara rivers, of which it forms the watershed. Rivers on the plateau flow mostly in a south–north direction.

The plateau has rich mining areas where iron and copper ores are extracted, as well as rock-salt, talc and mica. The Lena-Angara Plateau is mostly sparsely populated. The biggest settlements are Ust-Kut, Kirensk, Zheleznogorsk-Ilimsky, as well as the villages of Zhigalovo and Kachug. The Bratsk Reservoir is located in the plateau area.

== Geography ==
The Lena-Angara Plateau rises in the middle part of Irkutsk Oblast, between the Angara River to the west and the Kirenga River, a tributary of the Lena, to the east. To the northwest it is bound by the Angara Range, to the south by the Angara valley, to the southeast by the Primorsky Range, and to the east by the Baikal Range, beyond which lies Lake Baikal.

To the north the Lena-Angara Plateau merges with the Central Siberian Plateau. It extends roughly for over 600 kilometers (370 mi) with a maximum width of 380 kilometers (240 mi). The average height of the plateau surface is 1,100 meters (3,600 ft) in the south, decreasing to an average of 500 meters (1,600 ft) in the north. Mountaintops are flat and elevations moderate; the highest point is the Namai, a 1,464 meters (4,803 ft) high summit. This same mountain, however, is marked as a 4,852-foot-high (1,479 m) peak in the E-8 sheet of the Defense Mapping Agency Navigation charts. The same peak is shown as a 1,509-metre-high (4,951 ft) summit in the N-48 sheet of the Soviet Topographic Map.

=== Hydrography ===
The plateau is dissected by deep river valleys with average depths ranging between 600 meters (2,000 ft) and 200 meters (660 ft). The upper course of river Lena crosses the plateau roughly from south to north. Its tributaries Kirenga, Ilga, Tutura, Tayura and Kuta join it in the plateau area. The plateau also includes highly developed karst forms such as the Botovskaya Cave.

== Flora ==
There are taiga forests made up mostly of larch, spruce and Siberian pine in the higher areas and larch in the river valleys.

== See also ==
- List of mountains and hills of Russia
- Geography of Russia § Topography and drainage
