= Romny, Amur Oblast =

Rural locality in Amur Oblast, Russia

Coordinates: 50.719°N 129.292°E

Romny (Russian: Ро́мны) is a rural locality (a selo) and the administrative center of Romnensky District of Amur Oblast, Russia. Population: 3,084 (2010 census); 3,549 (2002 census); 4,712 (1989 Soviet census).
