= Romnensky District =

Romnensky District Ромненский район (Russian)
- District
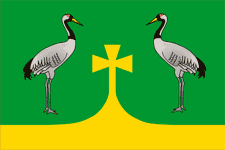
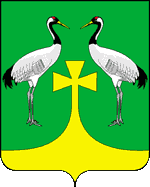
- Flag Coat of arms
- Location of Romnensky District in Amur Oblast
- Coordinates: 50°44′N 129°17′E
- Country: Russia
- Federal subject: Amur Oblast
- Established: 1941
- Administrative center: Romny

Area
  - Total: 10,066 km^{2} (3,887 sq mi)

Population (2010 Census)
  - Total: 9,401
  - Density: 0.9339/km^{2} (2.419/sq mi)
  - Urban: 0%
  - Rural: 100%

Administrative structure
  - Administrative divisions: 9 Rural settlements
  - Inhabited localities: 29 rural localities

Municipal structure
  - Municipally incorporated as: Romnensky Municipal District
  - Municipal divisions: 0 urban settlements, 9 rural settlements
- Time zone: UTC+9 (MSK+6)
- OKTMO ID: 10640000
- Website: http://ромны28.рф

Romnensky District (Russian: Ро́мненский райо́н) is an administrative and municipal district (raion), one of the twenty in Amur Oblast, Russia. The area of the district is 10,066 square kilometers (3,887 sq mi). Its administrative center is the rural locality (a selo) of Romny. Population: 9,401 (2010 Census); 11,822 (2002 Census); 15,651 (1989 Soviet census). The population of Romny accounts for 32.8% of the district's total population.
