= Tikhonovka =

Tikhonovka (Russian: Тихоновка) is the name of several rural localities in Russia:

- Tikhonovka, Republic of Bashkortostan, a village in Korneyevsky Selsoviet of Meleuzovsky District in the Republic of Bashkortostan; 53°17′N 55°37′E
- Tikhonovka, Republic of Crimea, a selo in Pervomaysky District of the Republic of Crimea
- Tikhonovka, Irkutsk Oblast, a selo in Bokhansky District of Irkutsk Oblast
- Tikhonovka, Lyudinovsky District, Kaluga Oblast, a village in Lyudinovsky District of Kaluga Oblast
- Tikhonovka, Medynsky District, Kaluga Oblast, a village in Medynsky District of Kaluga Oblast
- Tikhonovka, Zhizdrinsky District, Kaluga Oblast, a village in Zhizdrinsky District of Kaluga Oblast
- Tikhonovka, Burlakovskaya Rural Territory, Prokopyevsky District, Kemerovo Oblast, a settlement in Burlakovskaya Rural Territory of Prokopyevsky District in Kemerovo Oblast; 54°14′N 86°35′E
- Tikhonovka, Terentyevskaya Rural Territory, Prokopyevsky District, Kemerovo Oblast, a settlement in Terentyevskaya Rural Territory of Prokopyevsky District in Kemerovo Oblast; 54°07′N 86°57′E
- Tikhonovka, Kursk Oblast, a village in Rusanovsky Selsoviet of Fatezhsky District in Kursk Oblast
- Tikhonovka, Novosibirsk Oblast, a village in Ust-Tarksky District of Novosibirsk Oblast; 55°46′N 75°54′E
- Tikhonovka, Republic of Tatarstan, a selo in Almetyevsky District of the Republic of Tatarstan
- Tikhonovka, Aleksinsky District, Tula Oblast, a village in Solopensky Rural Okrug of Aleksinsky District in Tula Oblast
- Tikhonovka, Novomoskovsky District, Tula Oblast, a village in Prokhorovsky Rural Okrug of Novomoskovsky District in Tula Oblast
- Tikhonovka, Volgograd Oblast, a khutor in Primorsky Selsoviet of Kalachyovsky District in Volgograd Oblast
