= Vorobyovka =

Vorobyovka or Vorobyevka (Russian: Воробьёвка) is the name of several rural localities in Russia:

- Vorobyevka, Klimovsky District, Bryansk Oblast, a settlement in Vorobyevsky Selsoviet of Klimovsky District of Bryansk Oblast
- Vorobyevka, Mglinsky District, Bryansk Oblast, a village in Krasnokosarovsky Selsoviet of Mglinsky District of Bryansk Oblast
- Vorobyovka, Unechsky District, Bryansk Oblast, a settlement in Belogorshchsky Selsoviet of Unechsky District of Bryansk Oblast
- Vorobyevka, Chelyabinsk Oblast, a village in Rodnikovsky Selsoviet of Troitsky District of Chelyabinsk Oblast
- Vorobyevka (crossing loop), Chuvash Republic, a crossing loop in Tyurleminskoye Rural Settlement of Kozlovsky District of the Chuvash Republic
- Vorobyevka (village), Chuvash Republic, a village in Tyurleminskoye Rural Settlement of Kozlovsky District of the Chuvash Republic
- Vorobyevka, Irkutsk Oblast, a village in Bokhansky District of Irkutsk Oblast
- Vorobyevka, Republic of Kalmykia, a selo in Vorobyevskaya Rural Administration of Priyutnensky District of the Republic of Kalmykia
- Vorobyevka, Kaluga Oblast, a village in Peremyshlsky District of Kaluga Oblast
- Vorobyovka, Krasnoyarsk Krai, a village in Nikolsky Selsoviet of Abansky District of Krasnoyarsk Krai
- Vorobyevka, Oboyansky District, Kursk Oblast, a village in Uslansky Selsoviet of Oboyansky District of Kursk Oblast
- Vorobyevka, Ponyrovsky District, Kursk Oblast, a selo in Goryaynovsky Selsoviet of Ponyrovsky District of Kursk Oblast
- Vorobyevka, Solntsevsky District, Kursk Oblast, a selo in Vorobyevsky Selsoviet of Solntsevsky District of Kursk Oblast
- Vorobyevka, Lipetsk Oblast, a selo in Vorobyevsky Selsoviet of Khlevensky District of Lipetsk Oblast
- Vorobyevka, Republic of Mordovia, a village in Bulgakovsky Selsoviet of Kochkurovsky District of the Republic of Mordovia
- Vorobyevka, Orenburg Oblast, a selo in Pogrominsky Selsoviet of Totsky District of Orenburg Oblast
- Vorobyevka, Dolzhansky District, Oryol Oblast, a village in Uspensky Selsoviet of Dolzhansky District of Oryol Oblast
- Vorobyevka, Kolpnyansky District, Oryol Oblast, a village in Yarishchensky Selsoviet of Kolpnyansky District of Oryol Oblast
- Vorobyevka, Shablykinsky District, Oryol Oblast, a village in Navlinsky Selsoviet of Shablykinsky District of Oryol Oblast
- Vorobyevka, Uritsky District, Oryol Oblast, a village in Gorodishchensky Selsoviet of Uritsky District of Oryol Oblast
- Vorobyevka, Belinsky District, Penza Oblast, a village in Balkashinsky Selsoviet of Belinsky District of Penza Oblast
- Vorobyevka, Shemysheysky District, Penza Oblast, a selo in Vorobyevsky Selsoviet of Shemysheysky District of Penza Oblast
- Vorobyevka, Smolensk Oblast, a village in Saveyevskoye Rural Settlement of Roslavlsky District of Smolensk Oblast
- Vorobyevka, Tambov Oblast, a village in Chupovsky Selsoviet of Gavrilovsky District of Tambov Oblast
- Vorobyevka, Republic of Tatarstan, a village in Verkhneuslonsky District of the Republic of Tatarstan
- Vorobyevka, Vladimir Oblast, a village in Vyaznikovsky District of Vladimir Oblast
- Vorobyovka, Voronezh Oblast, a selo in Vorobyovskoye Rural Settlement of Vorobyovsky District of Voronezh Oblast
- Vorobyevka, Yaroslavl Oblast, a village in Pokrovsky Rural Okrug of Rybinsky District of Yaroslavl Oblast
