= Nashata =

Settlement in Irkutsk Oblast

Nashata Нашата
- Rural locality
- Interactive map of Nashata
- Location of Nashata Nashata (Russia)
- Coordinates: 53°14′35″N 104°25′52″E
- Country: Russia
- Federal subject: Irkutsk Oblast
- Administrative district: Bokhansky District

Population
  - Estimate (2012): 170 )
- Time zone: UTC+8 (MSK+5)
- Postal code: 669317
- OKTMO ID: 25609450131

Nashata (Russian: Нашата, Polish: Naszata) is a rural locality in Bokhansky District of Irkutsk Oblast, Russia. It has a population of 162 (2021 census); mostly Russian and Polish by ethnicity.

== Demographics ==
Distribution of the population by ethnicity according to the 2021 census:

| | percent |
| Russians | 49.38% |
| Poles | 45.06% |
| Tatars | 3.09% |
| Ukrainians | 1.85% |
