= Vorobyevka, Irkutsk Oblast =

Vorobyevka Воробьевка
- Village
- Location within Irkutsk Oblast Location within Russia
- Coordinates: 53°00′N 103°40′E
- Country: Russia
- Region: Irkutsk Oblast
- District: Bokhansky District
- Time zone: UTC+8:00

Vorobyevka (Russian: Воробьевка) is a rural locality (a village) in Bokhansky District, Irkutsk Oblast, Russia. Population: 202 (2010 census);

== Geography ==
This rural locality is located 18 kilometres (11 mi) from Bokhan (the district's administrative centre), 89 kilometres (55 mi) from Irkutsk (capital of Irkutsk Oblast) and 4,430 kilometres (2,750 mi) from Moscow. Shipnyagovka is the nearest rural locality.
