= Dunday =

Settlement in Irkutsk Oblast

Dunday Дундай
- Rural locality
- Interactive map of Dunday
- Location of Dunday Dunday (Russia)
- Coordinates: 53°12′55″N 104°20′58″E
- Country: Russia
- Federal subject: Irkutsk Oblast
- Administrative district: Bokhansky District

Population
  - Estimate (2012): 618 )
- Time zone: UTC+8 (MSK+5)
- Postal code: 669317
- OKTMO ID: 25609450101

Dunday (Russian: Дундай, Buryat: Дунда) is a rural locality in Bokhansky District of Irkutsk Oblast, Russia. It has a population of 557 (2021 census); mostly Russian and Buryat by ethnicity.

== Demographics ==
Distribution of the population by ethnicity according to the 2021 census:

	percent
Russians	53.68%
Buryats	43.99%
Poles	1.26%
Tatars	0.72%
