= Khonzoy =

Settlement in Irkutsk Oblast

Khonzoy Хонзой
- Rural locality
- Interactive map of Khonzoy
- Location of Khonzoy Khonzoy (Russia)
- Coordinates: 53°13′44″N 104°24′36″E
- Country: Russia
- Federal subject: Irkutsk Oblast
- Administrative district: Bokhansky District

Population
  - Estimate (2012): 49 )
- Time zone: UTC+8 (MSK+5)
- Postal code: 669317
- OKTMO ID: 25609450141

Khonzoy (Russian: Хонзой) is a rural locality in Bokhansky District of Irkutsk Oblast, Russia. It has a population of 40 (2021 census); mostly Russian and Polish by ethnicity.

== Demographics ==
Distribution of the population by ethnicity according to the 2021 census:

	percent
Russians	67.50%
Poles	30.00%
