= Granichnaya, Irkutsk Oblast =

Settlement in Irkutsk Oblast

Granichnaya Граничная
- Rural locality
- Interactive map of Granichnaya
- Location of Granichnaya Granichnaya (Russia)
- Coordinates: 53°7′52″N 104°21′53″E
- Country: Russia
- Federal subject: Irkutsk Oblast
- Administrative district: Bokhansky District

Population
  - Estimate (2012): 12 )
- Time zone: UTC+8 (MSK+5)
- Postal code: 669317
- OKTMO ID: 25609450126

Granichnaya (Russian: Граничная) is a rural locality in Bokhansky District of Irkutsk Oblast, Russia. It has a population of 13 (2021 census); mostly Russian and Uzbek by ethnicity.

== Demographics ==
Distribution of the population by ethnicity according to the 2021 census:

| | percent |
| Russians | 69.23% |
| Uzbeks | 30.77% |
