= Tikhonovka, Irkutsk Oblast =

Tikhonovka Тихоновка
- Village
- Location within Irkutsk Oblast Location within Russia
- Coordinates: 53°10′N 104°13′E
- Country: Russia
- Region: Irkutsk Oblast
- District: Bokhansky District
- Time zone: UTC+8:00

Tikhonovka (Russian: Тихоновка) is a rural locality (a village) in Bokhansky District, Irkutsk Oblast, Russia. Population: 1,488 (2010 census);

== Geography ==
This rural locality is located 30 kilometres (19 mi) from Bokhan (the district's administrative centre), 99 kilometres (62 mi) from Irkutsk (capital of Irkutsk Oblast) and 4,448 kilometres (2,764 mi) from Moscow. Tachigir is the nearest rural locality.
