= Kharagun, Bokhansky District =

Settlement in Irkutsk Oblast

Kharagun Граничная
- Rural locality
- Interactive map of Kharagun
- Location of Kharagun Kharagun (Russia)
- Coordinates: 53.170781°N 104.302902°E
- Country: Russia
- Federal subject: Irkutsk Oblast
- Administrative district: Bokhansky District

Population
  - Estimate (2012): 174 )
- Time zone: UTC+8 (MSK+5)
- Postal code: 669317
- OKTMO ID: 25609450136

Kharagun (Russian: Граничная, Buryat: Хара Уhан) is a rural locality in Bokhansky District of Irkutsk Oblast, Russia. It has a population of 145 (2021 census); mostly Buryat with a Russian minority.

== Demographics ==
Distribution of the population by ethnicity according to the 2021 census:

| | percent |
| Buryats | 73.10% |
| Russians | 26.90% |
