= Bokhan =

Bokhan may refer to:

- Bokhan (rural locality), a rural locality (a settlement) in Irkutsk Oblast, Russia
- 2338 Bokhan, an asteroid
