= Shumsky, Irkutsk Oblast =

Shumsky Шумский
- Urban-type settlement
- Interactive map of Shumsky
- Location of Shumsky Shumsky (Irkutsk Oblast)
- Coordinates: 54.8312°N 99.1316°E
- Country: Russia
- Federal subject: Irkutsk Oblast
- Administrative district: Nizhneudinsky District
- Elevation: 428 m (1,404 ft)

Population (2010 Census)
  - Total: 2,767
  - Estimate (2025): 1,271 (−54.1%)
- Time zone: UTC+8 (MSK+5)
- Postal code: 665130
- OKTMO ID: 25628165051

Shumsky (Russian: Шумский) is an urban locality (an urban-type settlement) in Nizhneudinsky District of Irkutsk Oblast, Russia. Population: 2,767 (2010 census); 3,177 (2002 census); 3,681 (1989 Soviet census).
