= Trams in Irkutsk =

Tram network in Irkutsk, Russia

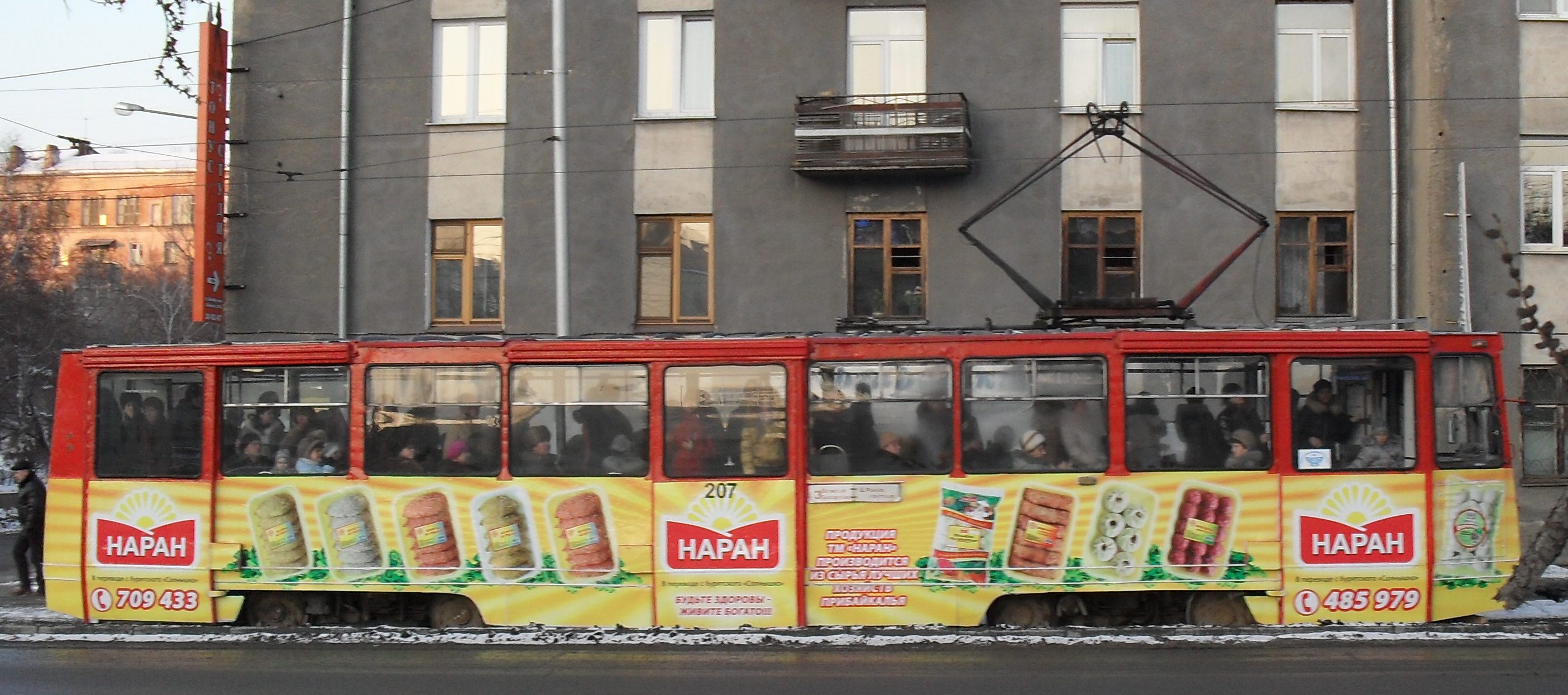

Operation
- Locale: Irkutsk, Irkutsk Oblast, Russia
- Open: 1947
- Lines: 7

Infrastructure
- Track gauge: 1,524 mm (5 ft)

Statistics
- Track length (total): 23.4 km

Trams in Irkutsk form the main surface transport network in Irkutsk, the capital of Irkutsk Oblast, Russia. The tramway was founded in 1947 and currently operates 7 lines.

== History ==
The first plans to create a tram system in Irkutsk appeared at the end of the 19th century, but initial plans to build a horsecar network were rejected by city authorities as too expensive and unreliable. The next iteration proposed an electric network, and the city government approved two lines, one crossing the Angara River and another bisecting the city north-south. However, implementation was stalled by the Russian Revolution in 1917.

Construction of the first line was started on July 5, 1945. According to the initial calculations of the designers, the tram system of the city was supposed to transport 44 million passengers annually (the average Irkutsk citizen makes 133 trips). Three routes were planned: 1) from the station to the tram depot on Krasnoyarskaya ul., 9.5 km long, the planned completion time of construction is 1947; 2) to the Leninsky district through the Irkutny bridge, 9 km long, the planned time for the end of construction is 1948; 3) through r. Ushakovka to the street. Barricade and st. Workers Headquarters, the planned completion time is 1950. There were plans to lay a tram track on Circum-Baikal Street. In 1950-1951, work was carried out on the construction of tram tracks. In 1952, the decision was revised and the dismantling of the tracks.

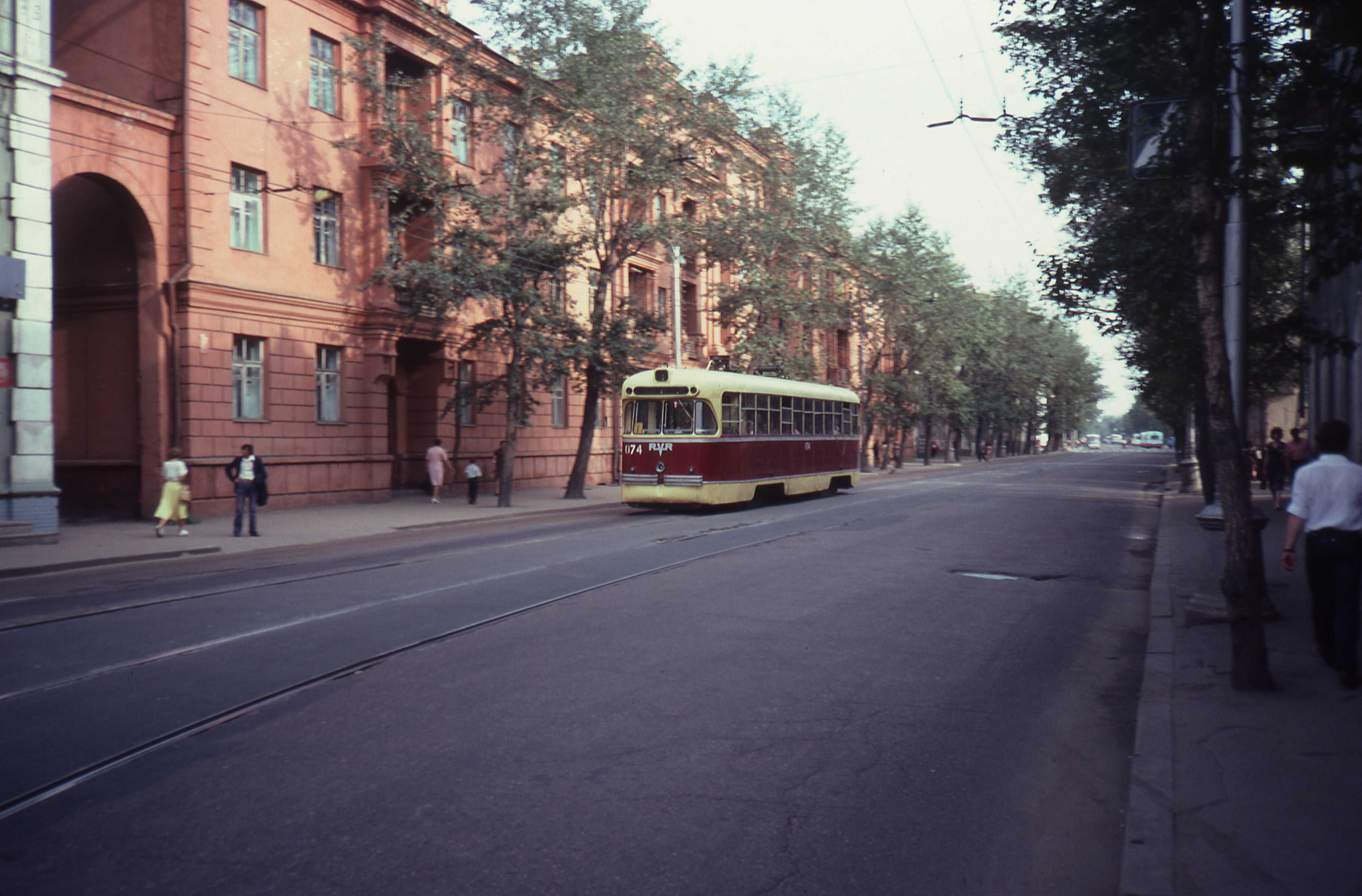
Tram RVZ-6 in 1982

The construction was carried out using the “people's construction” method - daily, 24 urban enterprises allocated 300–800 people for construction. The construction involved Japanese prisoners of war.

- 1946 - On November 7, the first line of the tramway was commissioned. Due to the failure of the deadline, the opening was postponed to December 31, and then to 1947.
- On August 3, 1947, route No. 1 “Station - Central Market” was launched (4 km one-track).
- 1948 - On September 12, six new trams from Leningrad entered the city highway. During the year of operation, the tram carried 2.5 million passengers.
- 1949 - at the end of May, the laying of second tracks began: from the railway station to ul. Stepan Razin, from Soviet Street. to the central market. By the end of the year, 5 km of tracks were laid. The total length of the route was 10 km. There are 14 trams in the park (most of them are from Leningrad). Received 8 cars: four from Leningrad and Chelyabinsk. The Leningrad trams were decorated with the inscriptions: "To workers from Irkutsk from Leningrad." For all the time of operation of the tram line (1947-1949), 11 million people were transported. The own overhaul of the cars started on August 1 - a tram came out on the route, which was repaired in the Irkutsk depot.
- 1950 - route number 2 "Station - Trampark." Started laying the way from the station to the Sverdlovsk market.
- 1952 - the passenger turnover of the Irkutsk tram was 17 million passengers a year.
- 1961 - Route number 1 is extended from the station to the campus.
- 1964 - route number 3 "Volzhskaya Street - Central Market".
- 1968 - route number 4 "Central Market - Pre
- 1968 - route number 4 "Central Market - Working Suburb".
- 1983 - route number 5 "Central Market - Sunny".
- 1990 - the Irkutsk tram transported the maximum number of passengers - 51.6. million people
- 1999 - 36.9 million people transported
- 2001 - transported 42.2 million people.
- 2002 - from December the fare rose to 5 rubles.
- 2003 - March 29, a strong fire occurred in the tram depot. 46.4 million people transported
- 2004 - from January 1, the fare was 7 rubles.
- 2005 - transported 27.4 million people.
- 2006 - after a long break (since 1992) the renovation of the tram fleet began - 2 cars were purchased KTM-19.
- 2007 - the Irkutsk tram transported 25.1. million people Route number 2 was extended for several months from the train station to the campus - this option did not catch on. The direction of movement of the 4th route along the stop has changed. The central market - before the tram was moving counterclockwise, while on the street. Baikal moved in the opposite direction of the traffic.
- 2008 - transported 24.8 million people. 6 KTM-19 tramcars purchased. Since January 1, the fare has grown to 10 rubles. During the year, 8 trams were written off from the park. The passenger turnover of the Irkutsk tram system per month is approximately 1.5 million passengers.
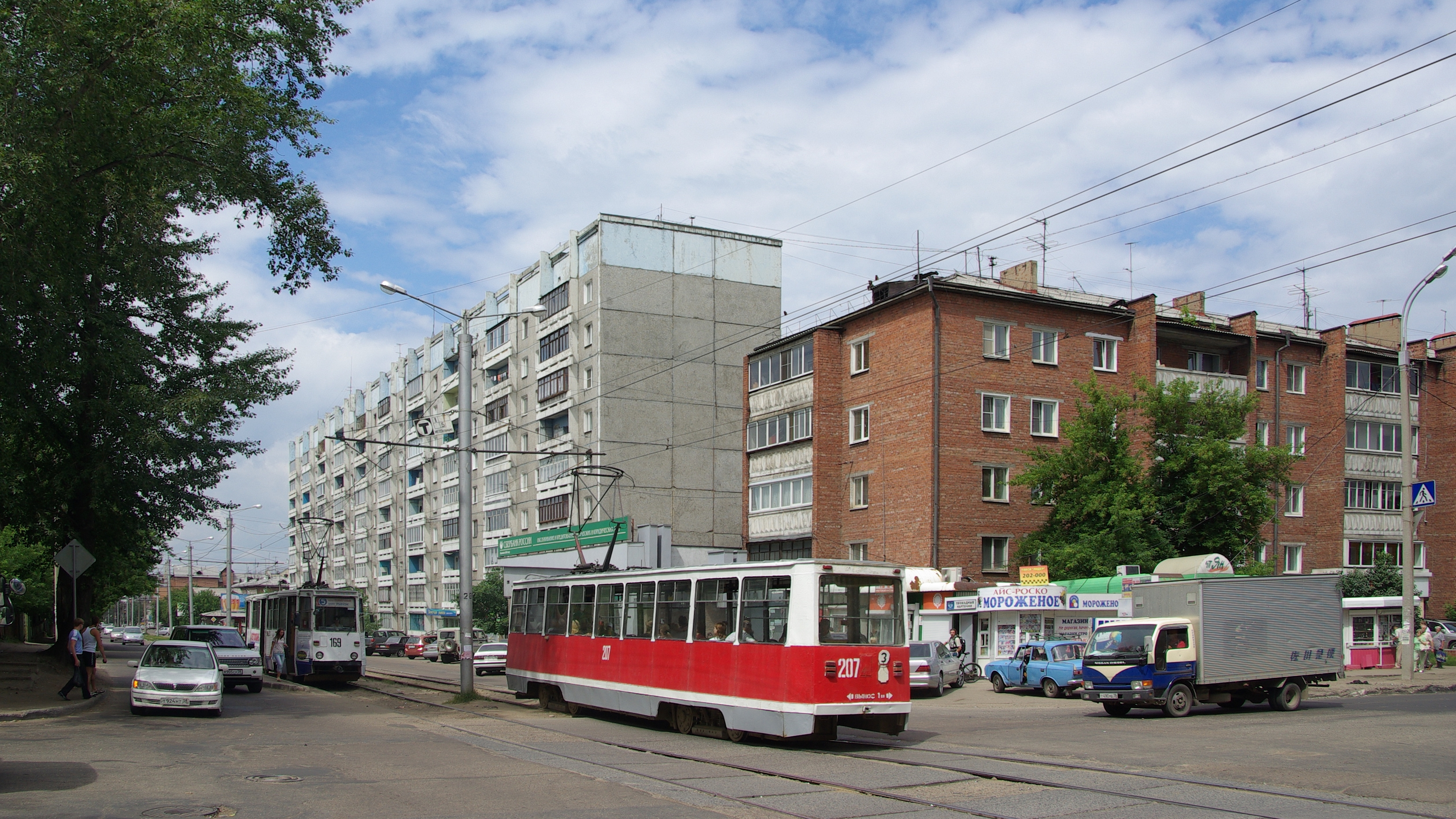
- Irkutsk trams in central district (2009)
  2009 - the Irkutsk tram transported 22 million people, bringing to the city treasury 199 million rubles.
- 2010 - in July, the first repaired car left the organized in the tram depot of the overhaul shop. In December, new routes “4a” appeared: Bratskaya Street. - well. Station and "3a": Volzhskaya Street. - Central Market (counterclockwise). The route "3a" worked until 31.12.2010.
- 2011 - in Irkutsk there were 58 tram cars operating on 6 routes. Every day, 37 of them went out onto the streets of the city (33 on weekends), transporting more than 70 thousand people As of January 2011, rolling stock wear was 86.2% (50 trams require major repairs).
- 2013 - in order to study the passenger traffic and to improve the quality of service to the population of Irkutsk, a new route of tram No. 6 is opened (micro district Solnechny - Volzhskaya street - Partizanskaya street - Central market - Deputatskaya street - micro district Solnechny).
- 2015 and 2016 - at the depot, CWR upgraded 2 wagons that run along the routes of the city.
- 2016 - November 5, the arrival of the first 4 used cars of the models 71-608КМ and 71-617 from Moscow. In December, the second batch of 6 used wagons arrived.
- 2018 - A new batch of Moscow trams arrived in the city of Irkutsk.

== Lines ==
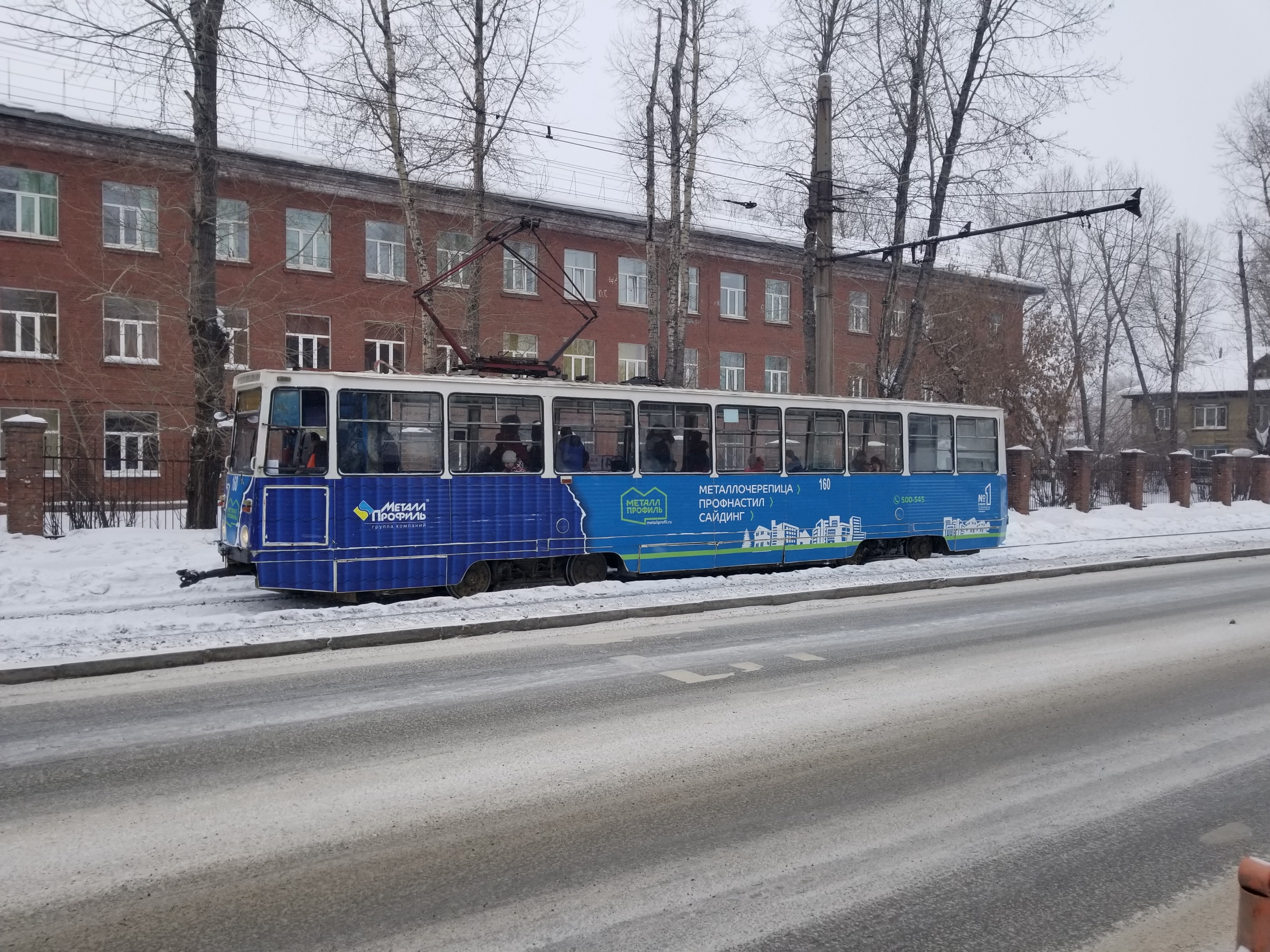
Tram 4 on Napolnaya St

- 1 - Campus - Volzhskaya Str. (Description of the route: Campus - railway station - Lenin Street - Central Market - then a ring section: Partizanskaya Street - Volzhskaya Street - Deputivskaya Street - Sovetskaya Street - Central Market and further up to Campus)
- 2 - well. Station - Trampark (Route description: Well
- 2 - well. railway station - Trampark (Route description: railway station - Lenin st. - Central market - Sovetskaya st. - Piskunova st. - Trampark)
- 3 - Volzhskaya Street - Central Market (clockwise) (description of the route: movement in a clockwise circle Central Market - Sovetskaya Street - Piskunova Street - Deputatskaya Street - Volzhskaya Street - Partizanskaya Street - Central Market)
- 4 - Central Market - Bratskaya Street (Entrance. Work) (description of the route: Central Market - Bus Station - Fuchik Street - Dynamo Stadium - Bratskaya Street)
- 4a - Bratskaya st. (Subject Worker) - Well.-D. Station (Description of the route: Bratskaya Street - Dynamo Stadium - Fuchik Street - Bus Station - Central Market - Lenin Street - Railway Station)
- 5 - mcr. Sunny - Central Market - Volzhskaya st. - md Solnechniy (route description: md. Solnechny - Tsentralniy market - Volzhskaya St. - and further to md. Solnechny)
- 6 - md. Solnechny - Volzhskaya - Central Market (since September 2, 2013) (route description: microdistrict Solnechny - Volzhskaya ul. - Partizanskaya ul. - Central market - Deputatskaya ulitsa - md. Solnechny).

== Rolling stock ==
Model	Entry into service	Withdrawn from service
Two-axle motor car of the Nikolaev plant	1949	1960
KTM-1 + KTP-1	1949	1975
KTM-2 + KTM-2	1961	1975
RVZ-6	1963	1990
RVZ-6M2	1987	
Tatra T3	1967	1972
KTM-5	1987	
KTM-8	1992	
KTM-19	2006	

== Accidents ==
- When extending route No. 1 to Campus, on the opening day of the line on May 1, 1953, a tram derailed at speed at the intersection of Pushkin St and Tereshkova St, turning over, hitting the stone wall opposite and continuing onward for 50 meters. Eyewitnesses add that the overturned tram hit people gathered at the bus stop, and those who were in the cabin also suffered badly. Officially, the accident, the number of victims and victims were not reported. As part of the investigation, the technical expertise concluded: the accident occurred due to brake failure.
- On November 4, 2003, at 15:34, the tram that followed route No. 2 spun across the old Angarsk bridge, and it almost fell into the river and completely blocked traffic for several hours

== Links ==
- The official site of MUE Irkutskgortrans
- Service for determining the location of public transport in Irkutsk
- "The Irkutsk Tram"
