= Irkutskoye Slovo =

Irkutskoye Slovo (Irkutsk Word; Иркутское слово) was a Menshevik-oriented weekly newspaper in Russia, published in Irkutsk from 1911 to 1912. Its publisher, Rozhkov, had joined the Russian Social Democratic Labour Party in 1905.
