= Tikhonovka, Kursk Oblast =

Rural locality in Kursk Oblast, Russia

Tikhonovka Тихоновка
- Village
- Interactive map of Tikhonovka
- Location of Tikhonovka Tikhonovka (Kursk Oblast)
- Coordinates: 52°04′44″N 35°50′49″E
- Country: Russia
- Federal subject: Kursk Oblast
- Administrative district: Fatezhsky District
- SelsovietSelsoviet: Rusanovsky

Population (2010 Census)
  - Total: 129
  - Estimate (2010): 129 (0%)

Municipal status
  - Municipal district: Fatezhsky Municipal District
  - Rural settlement: Rusanovsky Selsoviet Rural Settlement
- Time zone: UTC+3 (MSK)
- Postal code: 307119
- Dialing code: +7 47144
- OKTMO ID: 38644464166
- Website: морусановский.рф

Tikhonovka (Russian: Тихоновка) is a rural locality (Russian: деревня, lit. 'village') in Rusanovsky Selsoviet Rural Settlement, Fatezhsky District, Kursk Oblast, Russia. Population: 129 (2010 census); 123 (2002 census);

== Geography ==
The village is located on the Usozha River (a left tributary of the Svapa in the basin of the Seym), 102 km from the Russia–Ukraine border, 44 km north-west of Kursk, 0.7 km south-west of the district center – the town Fatezh, 1.5 km from the selsoviet center – Basovka.

Climate

Tikhonovka has a warm-summer humid continental climate (Dfb in the Köppen climate classification).

== Transport ==
Tikhonovka is located 1.5 km from the federal route M-2 Crimea Highway as part of the European route E105, 1.5 km from the road of regional importance 38K-038 (Fatezh – Dmitriyev), 0.5 km from the road of intermunicipal significance 38H-255 (M2 "Crimea Highway" – Chibisovka), 31.5 km from the nearest railway station Vozy (railway line Oryol – Kursk).

The rural locality is situated 46.5 km from Kursk Vostochny Airport, 166 km from Belgorod International Airport and 234 km from Voronezh Peter the Great Airport.
