= Tikhonovka, Volgograd Oblast =

Tikhonovka Тихоновка
- Khutor
- Location within Volgograd Oblast Location within Russia
- Coordinates: 48°32′N 43°40′E
- Country: Russia
- Region: Volgograd Oblast
- District: Kalachyovsky District
- Time zone: UTC+4:00

Tikhonovka (Russian: Тихоновка) is a rural locality (a khutor) in Primorskoye Rural Settlement, Kalachyovsky District, Volgograd Oblast, Russia. The population was 217 as of 2010. There are 7 streets.

== Geography ==
Tikhonovka is located 48 km southeast of Kalach-na-Donu (the district's administrative centre) by road. Kolpachki is the nearest rural locality.
