= Irkutsk =

City in Irkutsk Oblast, Russia

Irkutsk Иркутск
- City
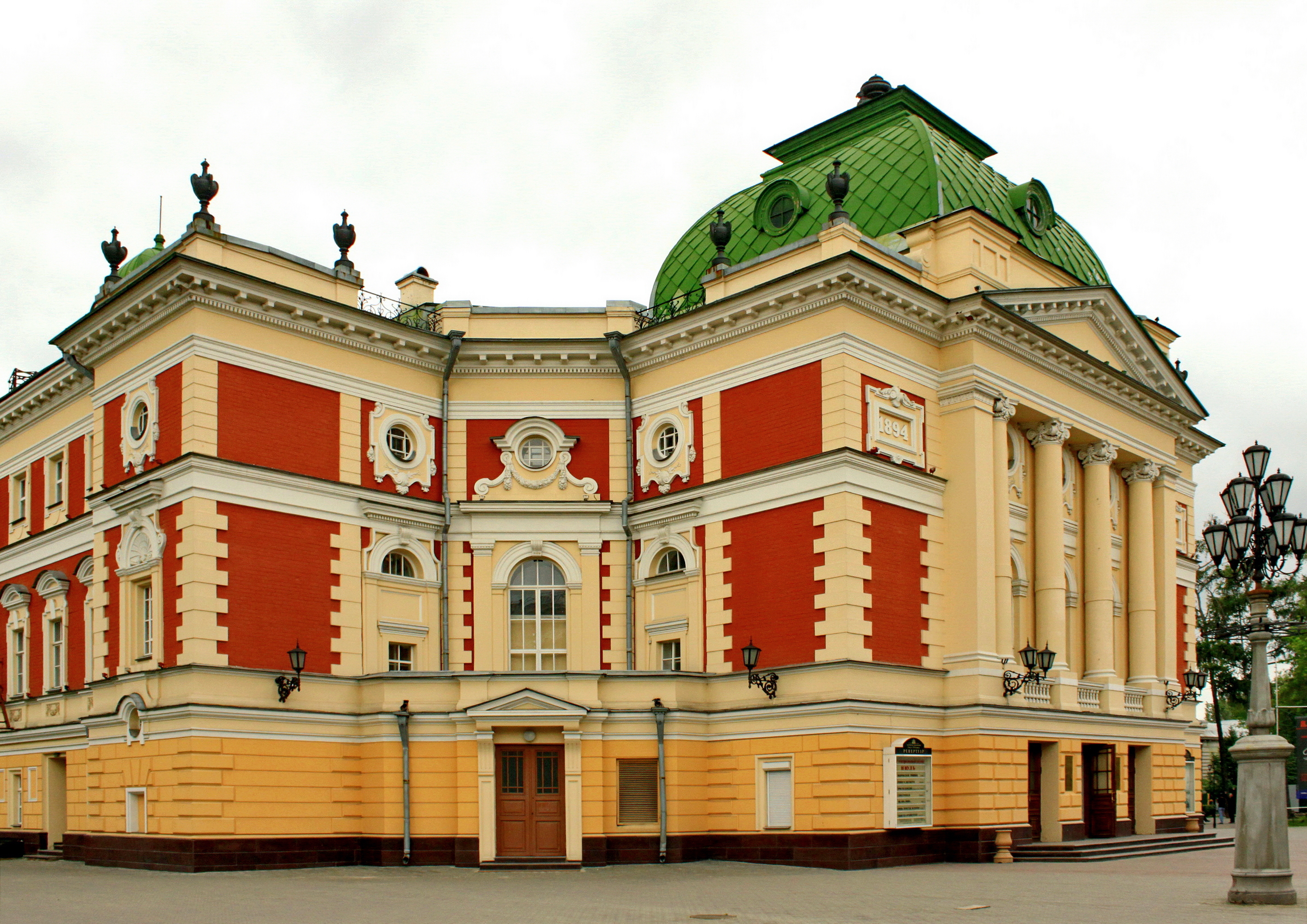
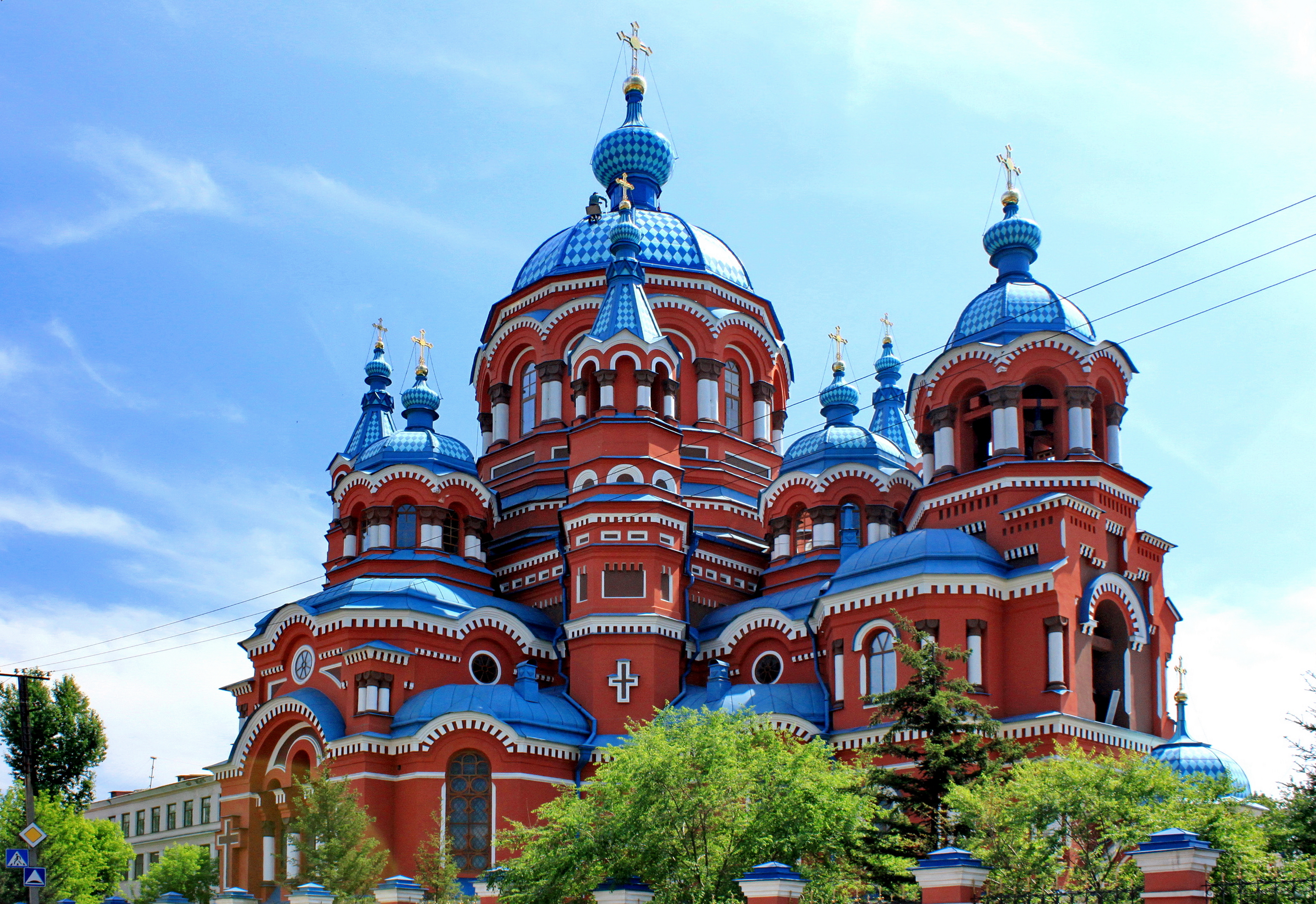
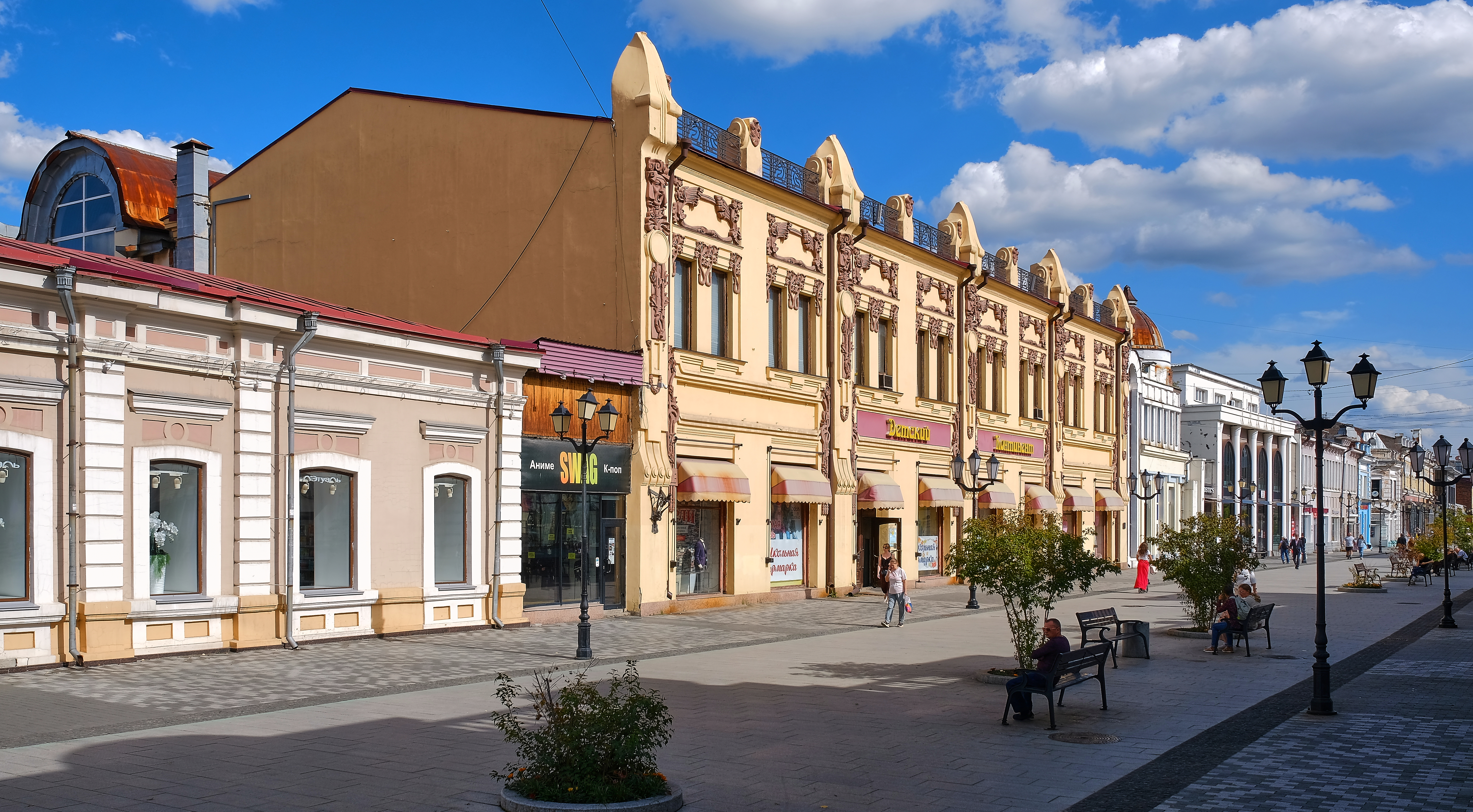
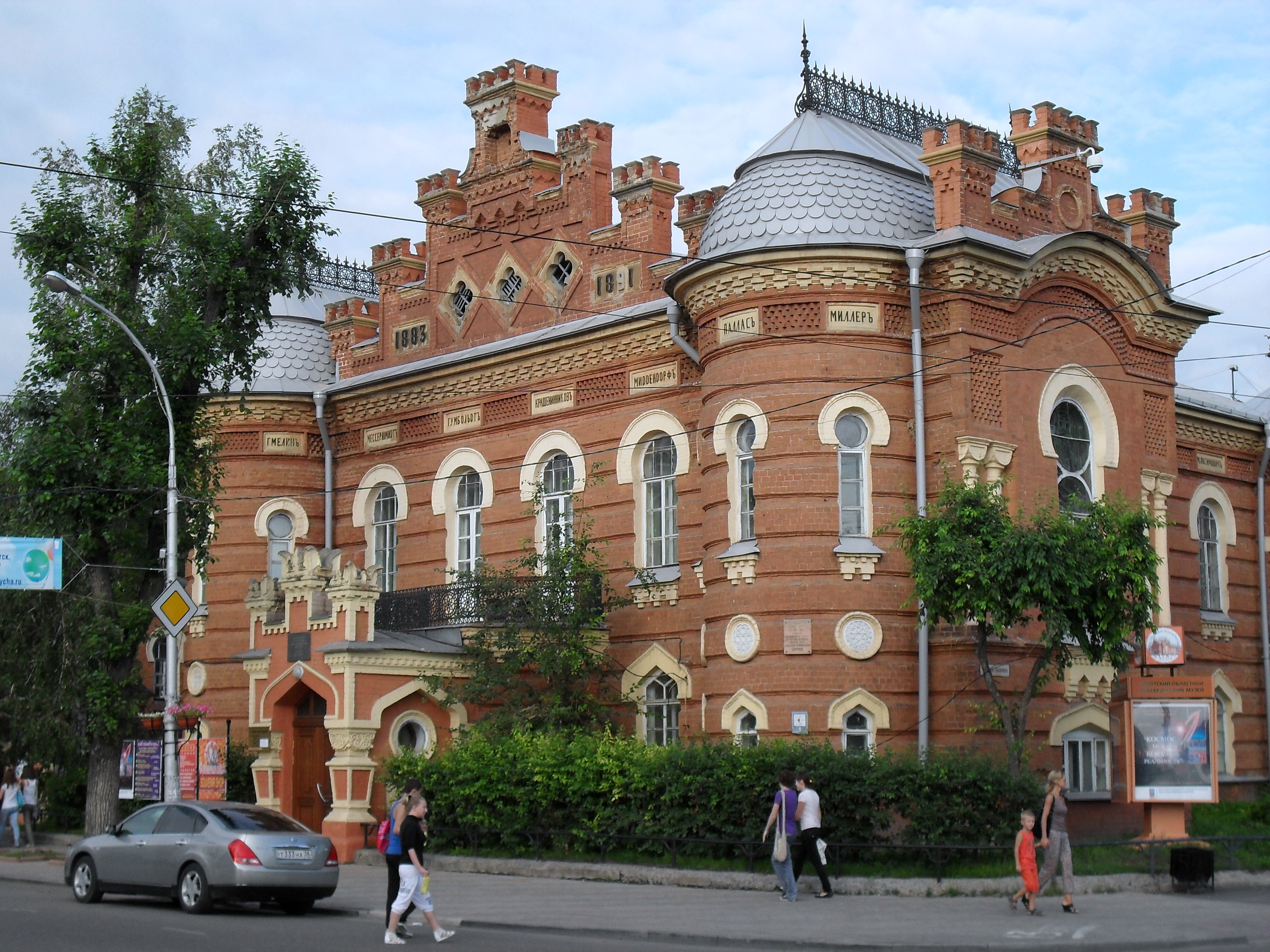
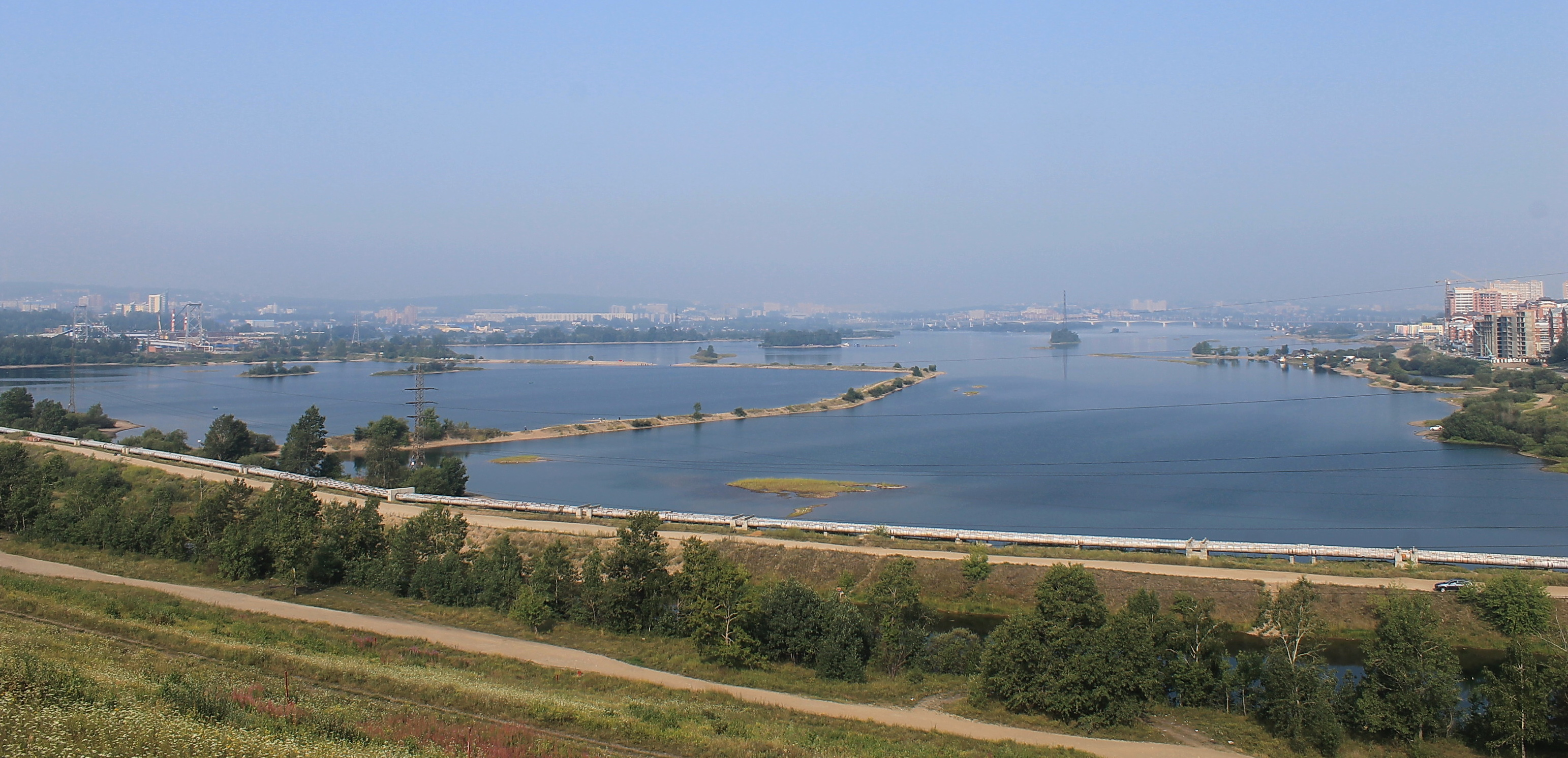
- Academic Drama Theater Kazan Church Uritsky Street Local Museum Panorama from the dam

- Flag Coat of arms
- Interactive map of Irkutsk
- Location of Irkutsk Irkutsk (Irkutsk Oblast)
- Coordinates: 52°17′21″N 104°16′48″E
- Country: Russia
- Federal subject: Irkutsk Oblast
- Founded: 1661

Government
  - Body: Duma of Irkutsk
  - Head: Ruslan Bolotov

Area
  - Total: 277 km^{2} (107 sq mi)
- Elevation: 440 m (1,440 ft)

Population (2010 Census)
  - Total: 587,891
  - Estimate (2025): 605,708 (+3%)
  - Rank: 24th in 2010
  - Density: 2,120/km^{2} (5,500/sq mi)

Administrative status
  - Subordinated to: City of Irkutsk
  - Capital of: Irkutsk Oblast, Irkutsky District

Municipal status
  - Urban okrug: Irkutsk Urban Okrug
  - Capital of: Irkutsk Urban Okrug, Irkutsky Municipal District
- Time zone: UTC+8 (MSK+5)
- Postal code: 664xxx
- Dialing code: +7 3952
- OKTMO ID: 25701000001
- City Day: First Saturday of June
- Website: irkutsk.ru

Irkutsk (Note: /ɪərˈkuːtsk/ eer-KOOTSK; Russian: Иркутск, IPA: [ɪrˈkutsk]; Buryat and Mongolian: Эрхүү, Erhüü [ɛrˈxuː]) is the largest city and administrative center of Irkutsk Oblast, Russia. With a population of 587,891 as of the 2010 Census, Irkutsk is the 25th-largest city in Russia by population, the fifth-largest in the Siberian Federal District, and one of the largest cities in Siberia.

Located in the south of the eponymous oblast, the city proper lies on the Angara River, a tributary of the Yenisei, about 850 kilometres (530 mi) to the south-east of Krasnoyarsk and about 520 kilometres (320 mi) north of Ulaanbaatar. The Trans-Siberian Highway (Federal M53 and M55 Highways) and Trans-Siberian Railway connect Irkutsk to other regions in Russia and Mongolia.

Many distinguished Russians were sent into exile in Irkutsk for their part in the Decembrist revolt of 1825, and the city became an exile-post for the rest of the century. Some historic wooden houses still survive. When the railway reached Irkutsk, it had earned the nickname of "The Paris of Siberia." The city was the center of bitter fighting in the Russian Civil War of 1918–20. Afterward, in the Soviet period, its architecture was dominated by the mandatory squared-up style. The city became a major centre of aircraft manufacture. The historic centre of Irkutsk is included in UNESCO's tentative list of World Heritage Sites.

== Etymology ==
Irkutsk was named after the Irkut River. Its name was derived from the Buryat word for "spinning," and was used as an ethnonym among local tribes, who were known as Yrkhu, Irkit, Irgit, and Irgyt. The city was formerly known as Yandashsky, named after the local Tuvan chief Yandasha Gorogi.

The old spelling of the city's name was "Иркуцкъ". Before the revolution, the city was called "East Paris", "Siberian Petersburg", "Siberian Athens".

== History ==
=== Establishment and early history ===
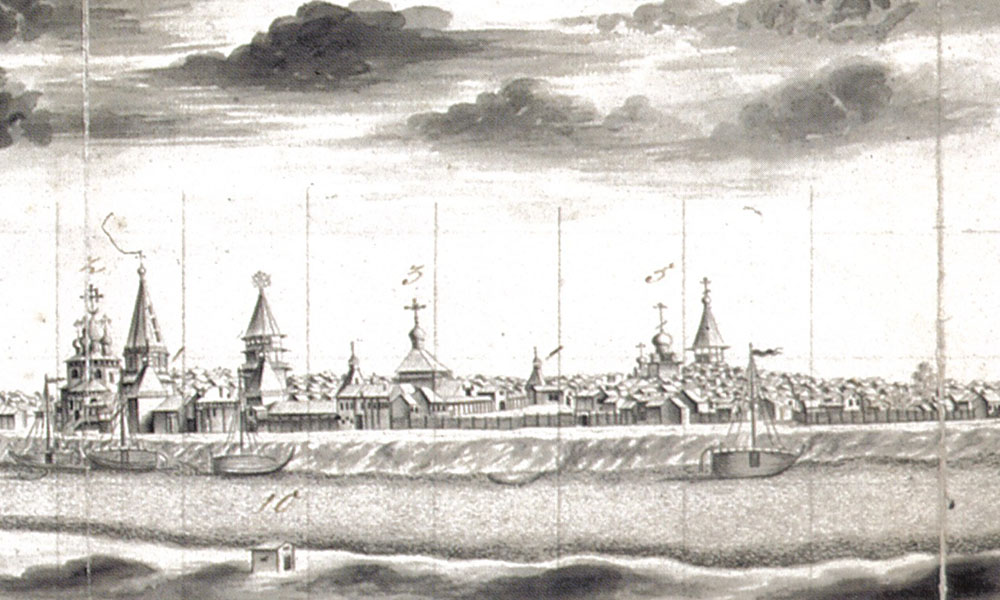
Irkutsk Castle in 1735

In 1652, Ivan Pokhabov built a zimovye (winter quarters) near the site of Irkutsk for gold trading and for collecting fur taxes from the Buryats. In 1661, Yakov Pokhabov built an ostrog (a small fort) nearby. The ostrog gained official town rights from the government in 1686.

The Irkutsk ostrog, founded in 1661 as an outpost for the advancement of Russian explorers in the Angara region, soon ceased to be only a defensive structure due to the advantage of its geographical position. According to historical documents, 10 years later, in 1671, here, in addition to servicemen and yasak people, lived "plowed peasants with their wives and children." A posad appeared, which gave rise to residential quarters of the future city. As for the fort itself, as its influence in the region grew, it was completely rebuilt twice (in 1669 and 1693), expanding in size.

The fate of the fort was such that its military-defensive significance was less noticeable than other previously erected forts near the Angara, for example, Bratsk (1631) or Verkholensk (1644). However, its location at the crossroads of colonization, trade and industrial routes predetermined the role of Irkutsk in the history of Eastern Siberia. In 1682 it became the center of an independent region, and in 1686 it received the status of a city. Irkutsk at the beginning of the 18th century was divided into two parts: "small town", or the fort itself, and "big city". The first one started from the bank of the Angara and was a wooden fortress with adjacent buildings. These included the stone building of the provincial chancellery, the house of the vice-governor (former voivodship) with barns and cellars, the Church of the Savior. "Small town" was the administrative center of the vast Irkutsk province since 1731.

In the "big city", as the posad was called, the commercial and economic life of Irkutsk was concentrated. It was inhabited mainly by people from the northern regions of Russia: Veliky Ustyug, Yarensk, Pinega, Solvychegodsk, Pereyaslavl-Zalessky, who brought their traditions, customs, and culture to Siberia.

=== Development ===
The first road connection between Moscow and Irkutsk, the Siberian Route, was built in 1760, and benefited the town economy. Many new products, often imported from China via Kyakhta, became widely available in Irkutsk for the first time, including gold, diamonds, fur, wood, silk, and tea. In 1821, as part of the Mikhail Speransky's reforms, Siberia was administratively divided at the Yenisei River. Irkutsk became the seat of the Governor-General of East Siberia.

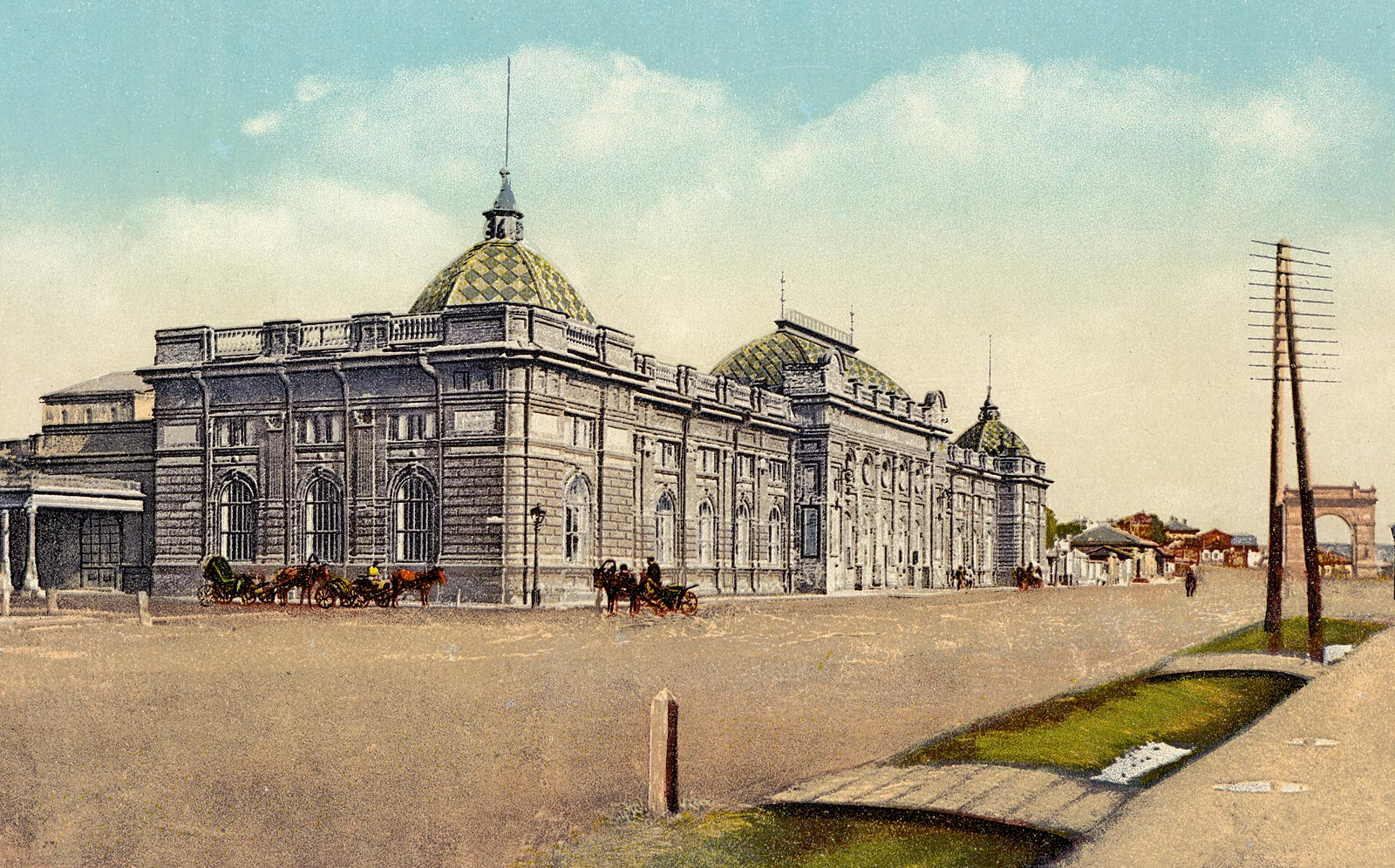
Irkutsk Assembly of the Nobility in the early 1900s

In the early 19th century, many Russian artists, officers, and nobles were sent into exile in Siberia for their part in the Decembrist revolt against Tsar Nicholas I. Irkutsk became the major center of intellectual and social life for these exiles, and they developed much of the city's cultural heritage. They had wooden houses built that were adorned with ornate, hand-carved decorations. Many still survive today, in stark contrast with the standard Soviet apartment blocks that surround them.

By the end of the 19th century, the population consisted of one exiled man for every two locals. People of varying backgrounds, from members of the Decembrist uprising to Bolsheviks, had been in Irkutsk for many years and had greatly influenced the culture and development of the city. As a result, Irkutsk became a prosperous cultural and educational center in Eastern Siberia. In 1866, four leaders of the Polish Baikal Insurrection were executed in Irkutsk.

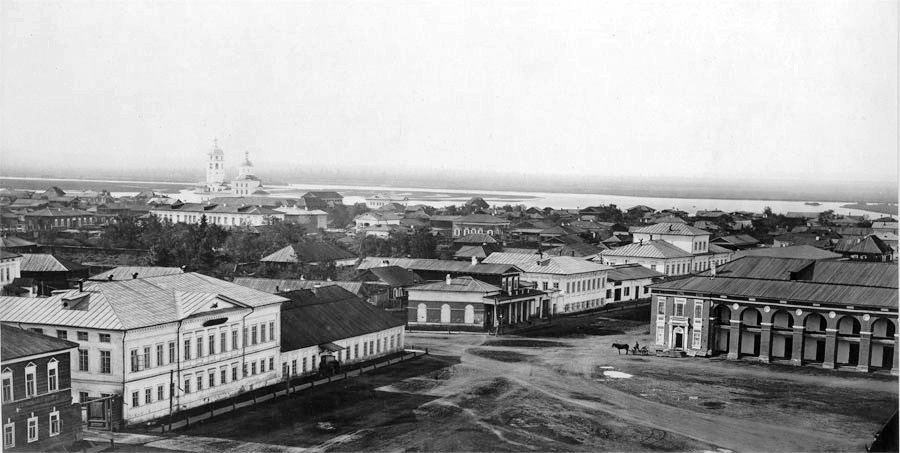
Epiphany Cathedral and central Irkutsk in 1865

From 1848 to 1861, Count Nikolay Muravyov-Amursky was the Governor-General. He annexed the Amur Territory to Russia, however, on the spot he showed unbridled despotism and extreme cruelty. Since the opening of communication along the Amur in 1854, on the way from St. Petersburg to the Pacific Ocean, the old Yakutsk tract began to decline. The population of the city is 28,000, of them there were 3,768 exiles.

In 1879, on July 4 and 6, a fire burned out of control, destroying the palace of the Governor General, and the principal administrative and municipal offices. Many of the other public buildings, including the government archives, the library, and the museum of the Siberian section of the Russian Geographical Society, were completely ruined. Three-quarters of the city was destroyed, including approximately 4,000 houses. The city quickly rebounded, installing electricity in 1896. The first theater was built in 1897 and a major train station opened in 1898. The first train arrived in Irkutsk on August 16 of that year. By 1900, the city had earned the nickname of "The Paris of Siberia." According to the 1897 census, Irkutsk had a population of 51,473, of which 87.4% were Russians, 6.5% Jews, 2.0% Poles, 1.5% Tatars, 0.6% Buryats, 0.5% Germans and 0.4% Ukrainians.

=== 20th century ===
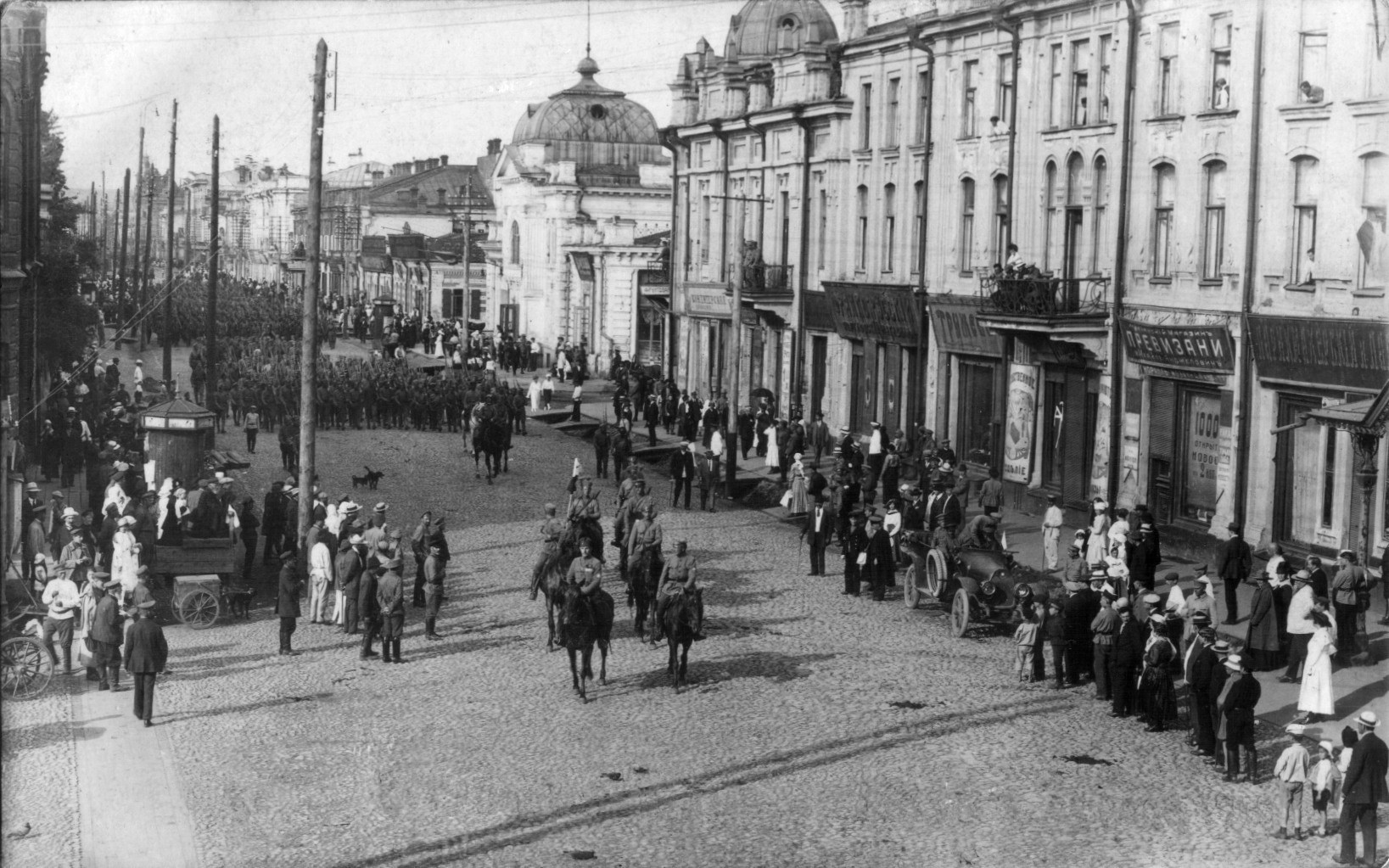
Irkutsk in 1918

During the Russian Civil War, which broke out after the October Revolution, Irkutsk became the site of many furious, bloody clashes between the "White movement" and the "Bolsheviks", known as the "Reds". In 1920, Aleksandr Kolchak, the once-feared commander of the largest contingent of anti-Bolshevik forces, was executed in Irkutsk. This effectively destroyed the anti-Bolshevik resistance.

Irkutsk was the administrative center of the short-lived East Siberian Oblast, from 1936 to 1937. The city subsequently became the administrative center of Irkutsk Oblast, after East Siberian Oblast was divided into Chita Oblast and Irkutsk Oblast.

The Irkutsk Region KGB estimated that 15,000 to 17,000 victims of the Great Terror were buried on the city outskirts but only after 1989 was the burial area explored and the city authorities declared it to be a memorial cemetery.

During the communist years, the industrialization of Irkutsk and Siberia in general was strongly encouraged. The large Irkutsk Reservoir was built on the Angara River between 1950 and 1959 in order to generate hydroelectric power and facilitate industrial development.

=== 21st century ===
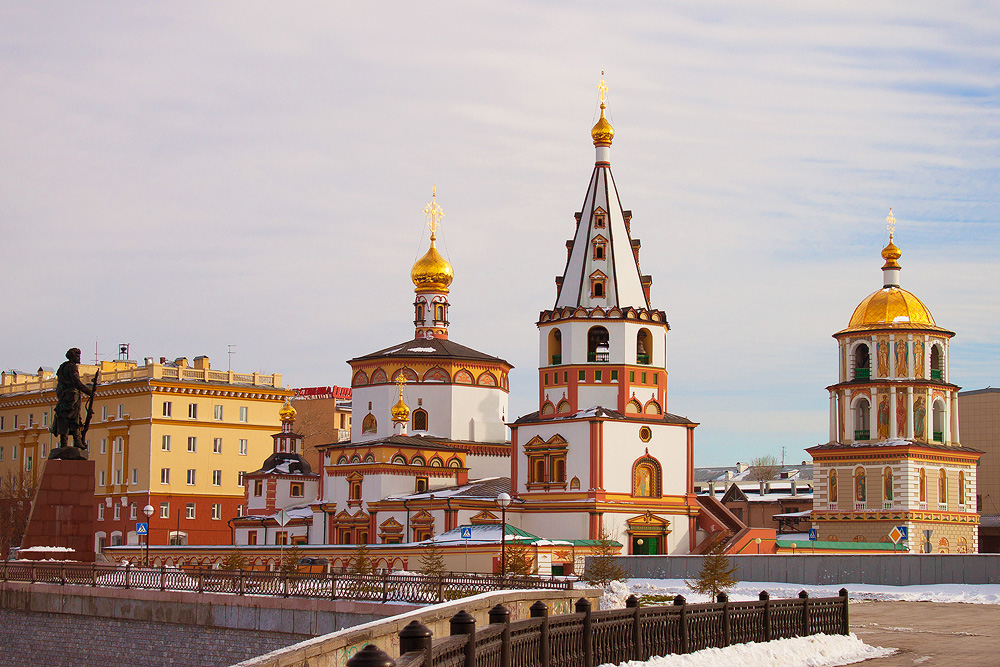
Epiphany Cathedral (built in 1718–1746)

The Epiphany Cathedral, the governor's palace, a school of medicine, a museum, a military hospital and the crown factories are among the public institutions and buildings. The Aleksandr Kolchak monument, designed by Vyacheslav Klykov, was unveiled in 2004. On July 27, 2004, the Irkutsk Synagogue (1881) was gutted by a fire.

In December 2016, 74 people in Irkutsk died in a mass methanol poisoning, after drinking this toxic alcohol substitute.

In 2018, the BBC reported that men in Irkutsk had an average life span of only 63. The society had declined and their health had suffered markedly.

In October 2021, it was reported that armed Russian OMON (Special Purpose Mobile Unit of the Russian National Guard) officers physically assaulted and tortured two Jehovah's Witness couples as part of a round up of Jehovah's Witnesses in the city.

== Geography ==
Irkutsk is located about 850 kilometres (530 mi) to the south-east of Krasnoyarsk, and about 520 kilometres (320 mi) north of Ulaanbaatar, the capital of Mongolia. The city proper lies on the Angara River, a tributary of the Yenisei, 72 kilometers (45 mi) below its outflow from Lake Baikal and on the bank opposite the suburb of Glaskovsk. The river, 580 meters (1,900 ft) wide, is crossed by the Irkutsk Hydroelectric Dam and three other bridges downstream.

The Irkut River, from which the town takes its name, is a smaller river that joins the Angara directly opposite the city. The main portion of the city is separated from several landmarks—the monastery, the fort and the port, as well as its suburbs—by another tributary, the Ida (or Ushakovka) River. The two main parts of Irkutsk are customarily referred to as the "left bank" and the "right bank", with respect to the flow of the Angara River.

Irkutsk is situated in a landscape of rolling hills in the thick taiga that is typical in Eastern Siberia.

=== Urban layout ===
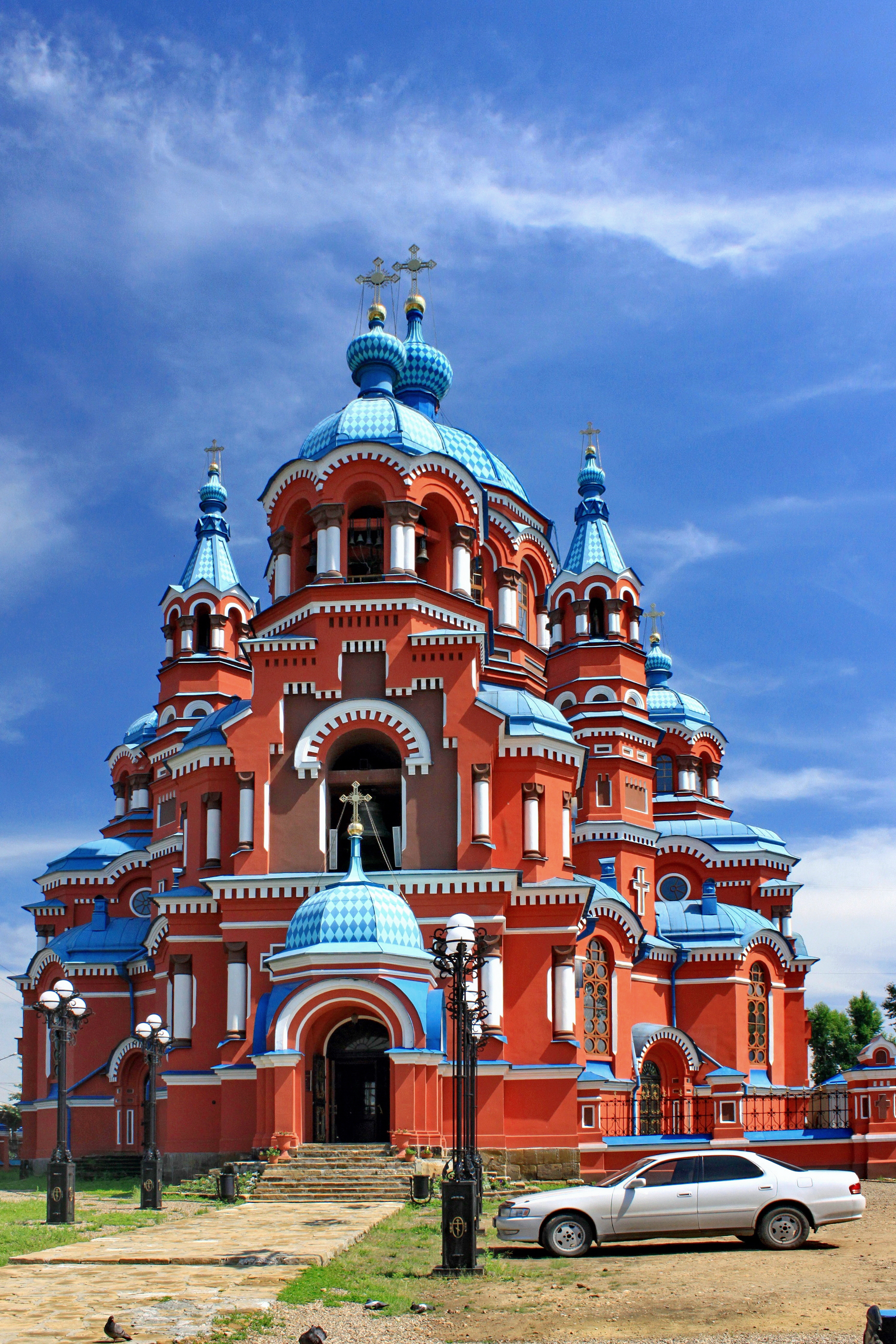
Cathedral of the Theotokos of Kazan

The center of the historical part of the city is Kirov Square. In that place on July 6, 1661, Yakov Pokhabov laid a prison for collecting Yasak, a tax collected from the local population with fur. The architectural appearance of present-day Irkutsk has been born since the days of the wooden prison. The historic center of the city is now in its place. By the beginning of the 18th century, it had turned into a wooden fortress, which protected the inhabitants from the raids of nomads. A major fire of 1716 almost completely destroyed the fortifications, but in just a year new ones were built, already made of stone.

Of the buildings on the territory of the Irkutsk Kremlin of that time, the Savior Church has survived, the stone building of which was laid in 1706 in the north-western corner of the fort. Along with the Epiphany Cathedral, erected behind the eastern wall of the fortress and also preserved to this day, this is one of the oldest stone buildings in Siberia. The protective palisade and the moat, which once defended the Irkutsk fortress from the south, from the Angara bank to the Ushakovka River, existed until the middle of the 18th century.

In early Irkutsk there were no streets at all, the buildings approached the driveways with random turns and only with subsequent alterations were turned around with front facades. The first settlers did not orient their houses in relation to neighboring buildings either. When building a new house, the owners usually adhered only to the orientation of the windows to the south side. This is how the layout of the oldest part of the city took shape — from Angara to modern Karl Marx Street: the main directions of the streets repeat the outlines of the coastline, which, in turn, are crossed by transverse passages connecting the outskirts of the city with the center and overlooking the Angara bank.

The curvature of the central streets and the disparity of the quarters formed by them, shows the spontaneous process of their formation. This is especially noticeable in the example of Basninskaya Street (now Sverdlova Street), which they tried to straighten with each new attempt to streamline the development. And it simply repeated the outlines of the log that once was here, formed, possibly, by the old lady of the Gryaznushka river, which connected Ushakovka and Angara.

In 1726, defensive fortifications (palisade) were built in Irkutsk, behind which the barracks of the local garrison were taken out. The construction of the palisade changed the process of the spontaneous evolution of buildings and influenced the formation of the city's layout in the most significant way. After the fortification was dismantled in 1790, a complete mismatch of street directions in the old and new parts of the city was revealed.

The state of development of the "pre-palisade" period is reflected in the first of the known plans of Irkutsk in 1729. Its main advantage is the fixation of the city's borders, which ran along the line of the modern Karl Marx Street. Between 1729 and 1768 in the space between Angara and Ushakovka, the first "zapalisadny" row of blocks is formed. A spontaneous settlement appears near the soldiers' barracks, first along the roads that approached the Mill and Overseas gates, and then between them. The development proceeded unevenly, the closest to the current state at that time were the fragments of buildings located in the area of Zamorskaya (Lenin st.) And Institutskaya (Oktyabrskaya Revolyutsii st.) Streets. Now it is, roughly, quarters No. 90, 91, 92.

The last third of the 18th century was significant both for the history of the city as a whole and for the formation of its buildings. With the formation of the Irkutsk province in 1764, Irkutsk became the center of the largest region in Russia—Eastern Siberia, which included Transbaikalia, Yakutia, the entire northeast to the Pacific Ocean. Irkutsk needed to expand, and by that time there were no enemies ready to lay claim to the city. The palisade was dismantled, and in its place appeared Bolshaya Preshpektnaya Street, now Karla Marxa Street, the only straight street in modern Irkutsk. The devastating fire of 1879 made its own adjustments to the construction laws as it was from here that the border began, beyond which it was forbidden to build from wood. This has divided the old Irkutsk into two parts: closer to the Angara river, mainly stone buildings remained, and on the other side, where there were once outskirts, the wooden Irkutsk grew.

=== Climate ===
Irkutsk has a borderline humid continental climate (Köppen climate classification Dwb, bordering Dwc, Trewartha climate classification Dcbc, bordering on Ecbc).

Irkutsk is characterized by an extreme variation of temperatures between seasons. It can be very warm in the summer, and very cold in the winter. However, Lake Baikal has a tempering effect, giving Irkutsk temperatures that are slightly less extreme than at similar latitudes elsewhere in Siberia. The warmest month of the year is July, when the average temperature is +19 °C (66 °F); the highest temperature recorded being +37.2 °C (99.0 °F). The coldest month of the year is January, when the average temperature is −17.6 °C (0.3 °F), and record low of −49.7 °C (−57.5 °F). Precipitation varies widely throughout the year, with July being the wettest month, when precipitation averages 107 millimeters (4.2 in). The driest month is February, when precipitation averages only 9 millimeters (0.35 in). Almost all precipitation during the Siberian winter falls as fluffy, dry snow.

Climate data for Irkutsk (1991–2020, extremes 1820–present)
Month	Jan	Feb	Mar	Apr	May	Jun	Jul	Aug	Sep	Oct	Nov	Dec	Year
Record high °C (°F)	2.3 (36.1)	10.2 (50.4)	21.1 (70.0)	29.2 (84.6)	34.5 (94.1)	35.6 (96.1)	37.2 (99.0)	34.7 (94.5)	29.7 (85.5)	25.6 (78.1)	14.4 (57.9)	5.3 (41.5)	37.2 (99.0)
Mean daily maximum °C (°F)	−12.7 (9.1)	−7.5 (18.5)	1.2 (34.2)	10.5 (50.9)	18.1 (64.6)	23.8 (74.8)	25.7 (78.3)	22.9 (73.2)	16.1 (61.0)	7.9 (46.2)	−2.7 (27.1)	−10.8 (12.6)	7.7 (45.9)
Daily mean °C (°F)	−17.6 (0.3)	−14.1 (6.6)	−5.5 (22.1)	3.6 (38.5)	10.4 (50.7)	16.4 (61.5)	19.0 (66.2)	16.4 (61.5)	9.5 (49.1)	2.0 (35.6)	−7.6 (18.3)	−15.4 (4.3)	1.4 (34.5)
Mean daily minimum °C (°F)	−21.4 (−6.5)	−19.1 (−2.4)	−11.1 (12.0)	−1.9 (28.6)	3.7 (38.7)	10.1 (50.2)	13.5 (56.3)	11.4 (52.5)	4.6 (40.3)	−2.4 (27.7)	−11.5 (11.3)	−19.1 (−2.4)	−3.6 (25.5)
Record low °C (°F)	−49.7 (−57.5)	−44.7 (−48.5)	−37.3 (−35.1)	−31.8 (−25.2)	−14.3 (6.3)	−6 (21)	0.4 (32.7)	−2.7 (27.1)	−11.9 (10.6)	−30.5 (−22.9)	−40.4 (−40.7)	−46.3 (−51.3)	−49.7 (−57.5)
Average precipitation mm (inches)	14 (0.6)	9 (0.4)	12 (0.5)	21 (0.8)	36 (1.4)	69 (2.7)	107 (4.2)	96 (3.8)	53 (2.1)	21 (0.8)	20 (0.8)	19 (0.7)	477 (18.8)
Average extreme snow depth cm (inches)	24 (9.4)	28 (11)	18 (7.1)	1 (0.4)	0 (0)	0 (0)	0 (0)	0 (0)	0 (0)	1 (0.4)	8 (3.1)	18 (7.1)	28 (11)
Average rainy days	0	0.04	1	9	15	18	18	17	16	9	2	0	105
Average snowy days	21	16	13	11	3	0.2	0	0	2	10	20	23	119
Average relative humidity (%)	81	74	63	54	53	65	72	76	75	71	78	84	71
Mean monthly sunshine hours	108.8	157.3	226.6	248.1	276.2	275.2	267.9	233.1	181.7	156.5	95.4	74.8	2,301.6
Source 1: Pogoda.ru.net
Source 2: NOAA

== Demographics ==
Historical population

Year	Pop.	±%
1897	51,473	—
1926	102,733	+99.6%
1939	250,181	+143.5%
1959	365,893	+46.3%
1970	450,941	+23.2%

Year	Pop.	±%
1979	549,787	+21.9%
1989	626,135	+13.9%
2002	593,604	−5.2%
2010	587,891	−1.0%
2021	617,264	+5.0%

Source: Censuses

The population has been shrinking since the late 1980s: 587,891 (2010 census); 593,604 (2002 census); 622,301 (1989 Soviet census).. According to the regional plan, Irkutsk city will be combined with its neighboring industrial towns of Shelekhov and Angarsk to form a metropolitan area with a total population of over a million.

== Administrative and municipal status ==
Irkutsk is the administrative center of the oblast and, within the framework of administrative divisions, it also serves as the administrative center of Irkutsky District, even though it is not a part of it. As an administrative division, it is incorporated separately as the City of Irkutsk—an administrative unit with the status equal to that of the districts. As a municipal division, the City of Irkutsk is incorporated as Irkutsk Urban Okrug.

== Coat of arms ==
The original version of the coat of arms

The coat of arms of Irkutsk features an old symbol of Dauria: a Siberian tiger with a sable in his mouth. When the coat of arms was devised in 1690, the animal was described as a tiger ("babr", a bookish word of Persian derivation) with a sable in his mouth. This image had been used by the Yakutsk customs office from about 1642. It has its origin in a seal of the Siberia Khanate representing a sable and showcasing the fact that Siberia (or rather Yugra) was the main source of sable fur throughout the Middle Ages.

By the mid-19th century, the word "babr" had fallen out of common usage, but it was still recorded in the Armorial of the Russian Empire. Furthermore, the tigers became extinct in this part of Siberia. In the 1870s, a high-placed French heraldist with a limited command of Russian assumed that "babr" was a misspelling of "bobr", the Russian word for "beaver", and changed the wording accordingly. This modification engendered a long dispute between the local authorities, who were so confused by the revised description that they started to depict the "babr" as a fabulous animal, half-tiger and half-beaver.

The Soviets abolished the image altogether, but it was restored following the dissolution of the Soviet Union.

== Economy ==
=== Energy ===
The 662.4 MW Irkutsk Hydroelectric Power Station was the first cascade hydroelectric power station in the Irkutsk region. The construction of the dam started in 1950 and finished in 1958.

=== Industry ===
The largest industry in Irkutsk is Irkut, the Irkutsk Aviation Industrial Association, which was set up in 1932 in the Transbaykal region of the Soviet Union. It is best known as being the manufacturer of the Su-30 family of interceptor/ground-attack aircraft. The Russian government has merged Irkut with Ilyushin, Mikoyan, Sukhoi, Tupolev, and Yakovlev into a new company named United Aircraft Building Corporation.

=== Transportation ===
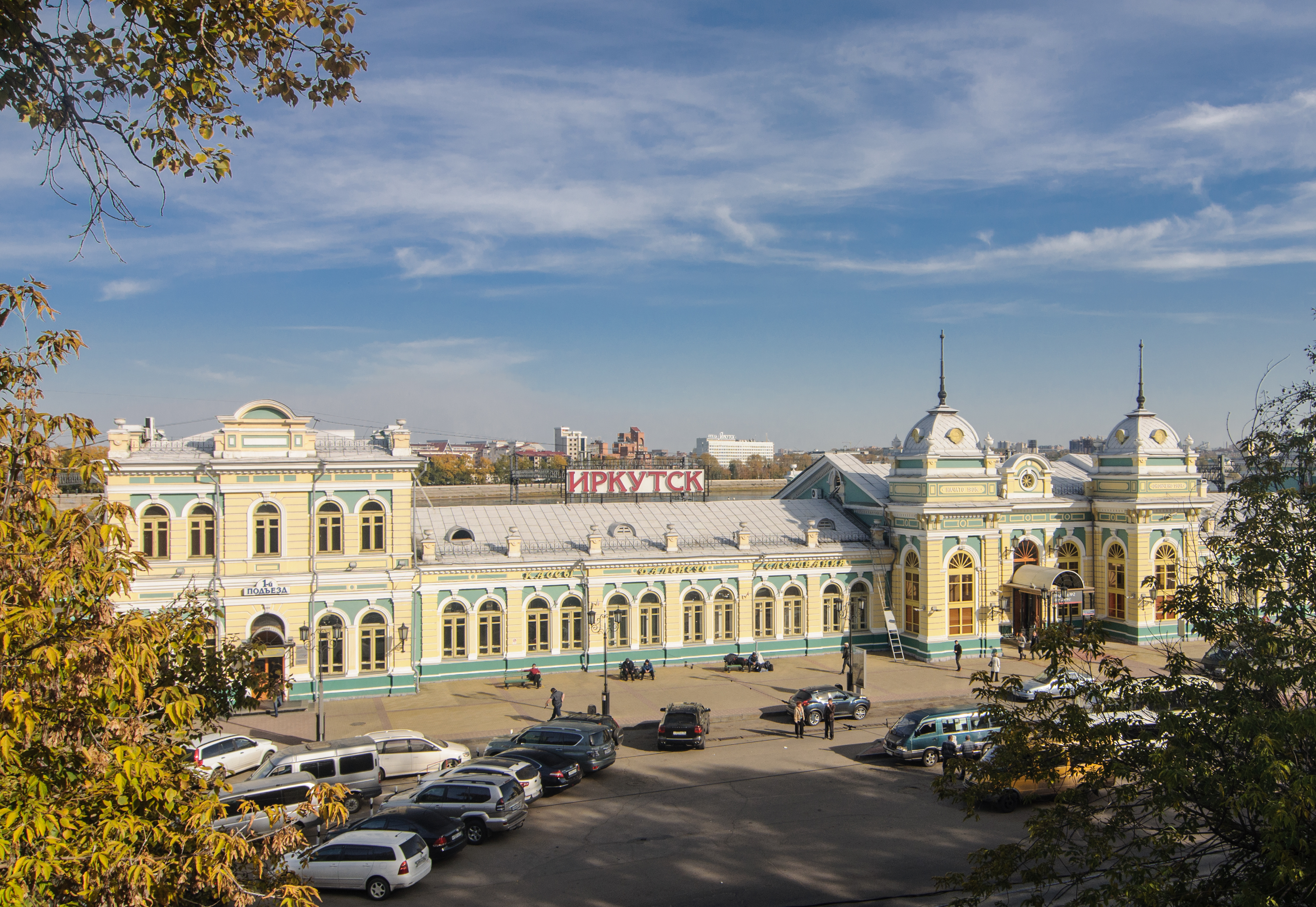
Irkutsk railway station

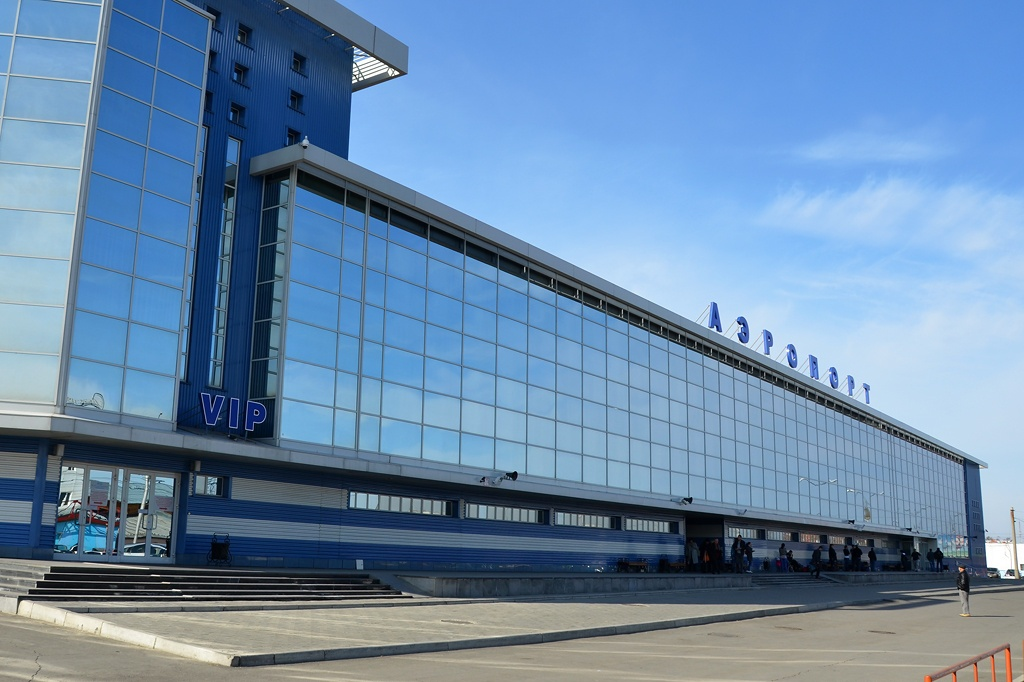
Irkutsk international airport

Important roads and railways like the Trans-Siberian Highway (Federal M53 and M55 Highways) and Trans-Siberian Railway connect Irkutsk to other regions in Russia and Mongolia. The city is also served by the Irkutsk International Airport and the smaller Irkutsk Northwest Airport.

The Federal road and railway to Moscow and Vladivostok pass through the other side of the Angara River from central Irkutsk.

Trams are one major mode of public transit in Irkutsk. Other modes are trolleybus, bus, fixed-route taxi (marshrutka) and cycling.

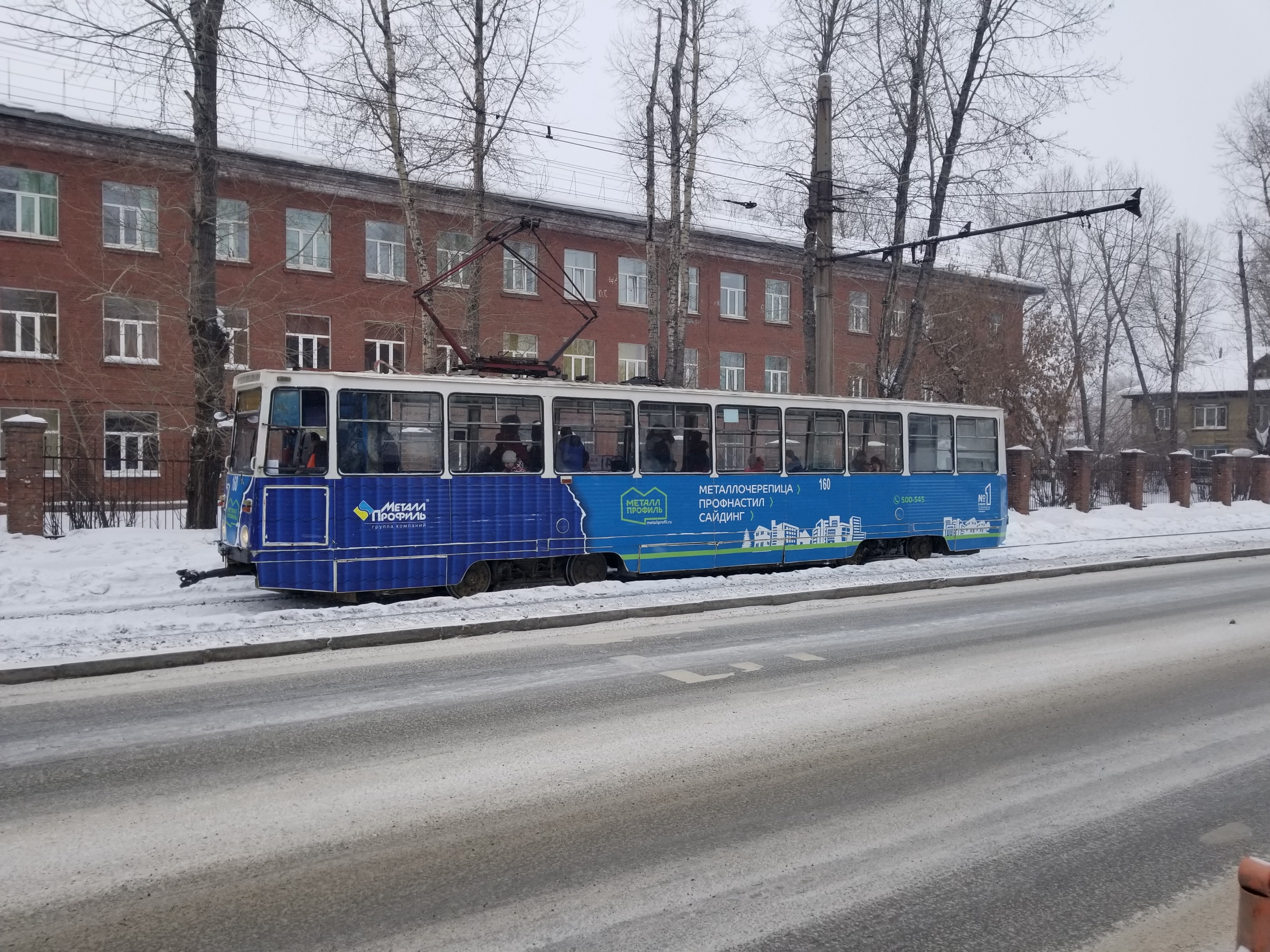
Tram

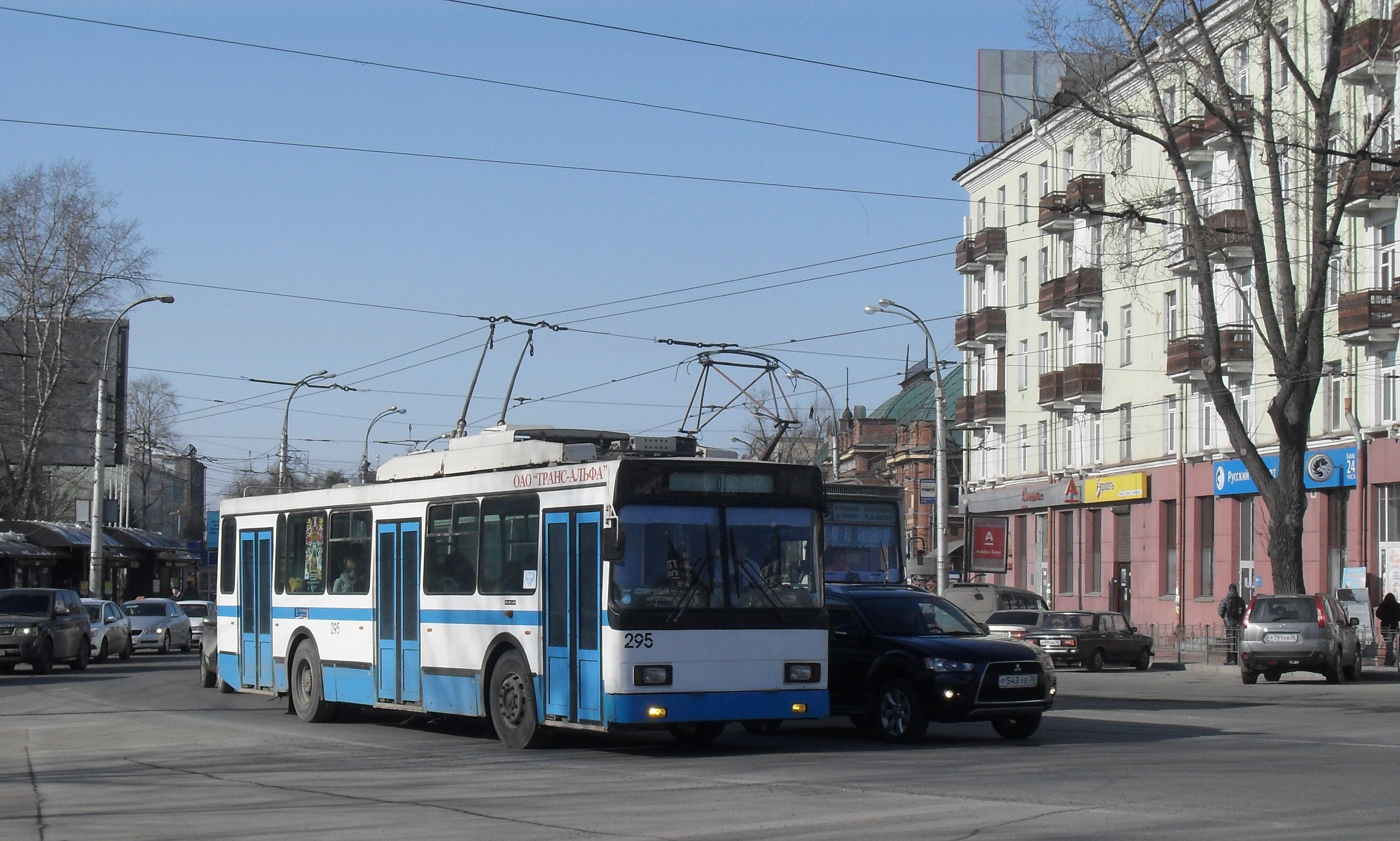
Trolleybus

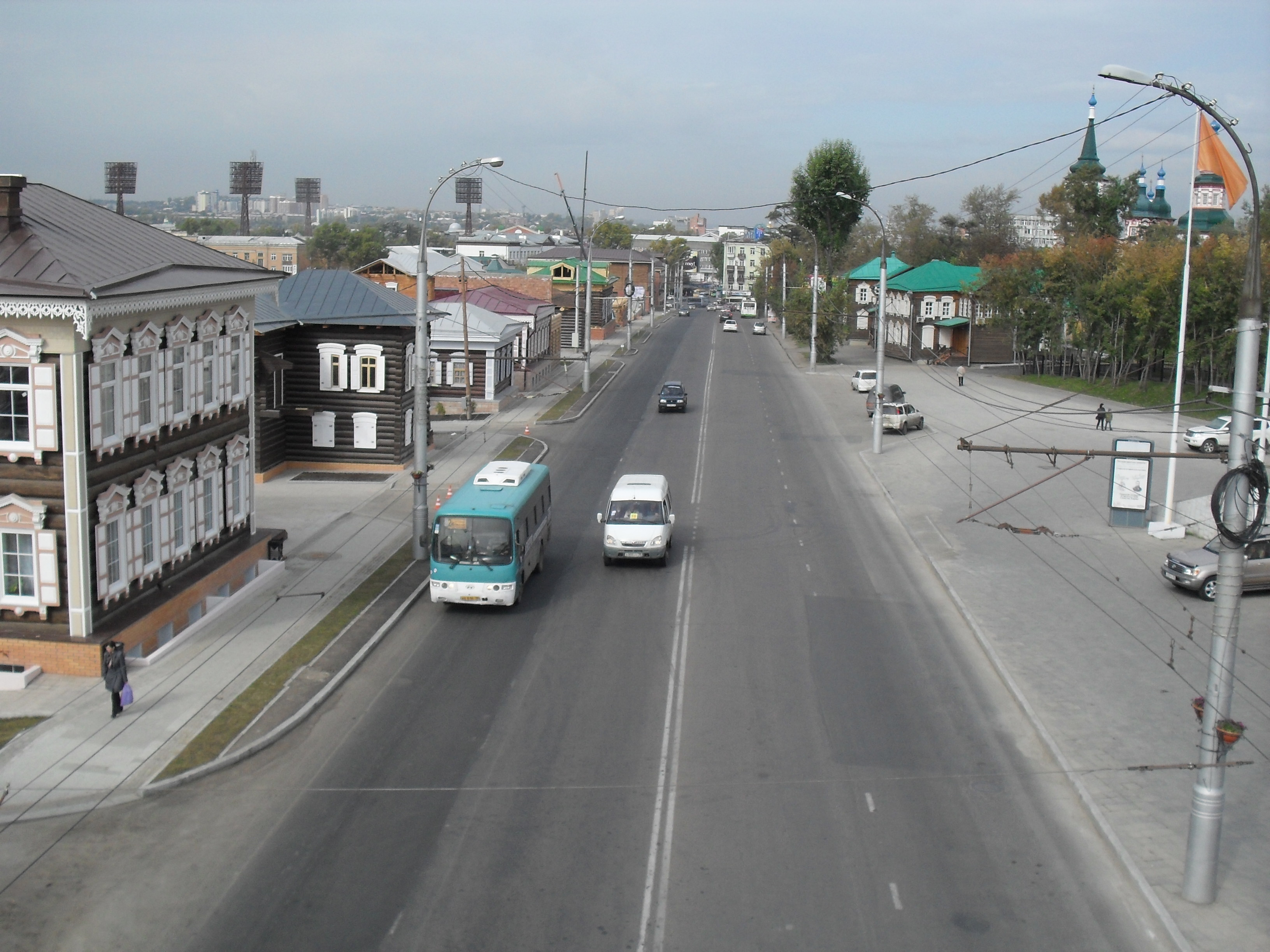
Bus on Sedov Street

== Culture ==
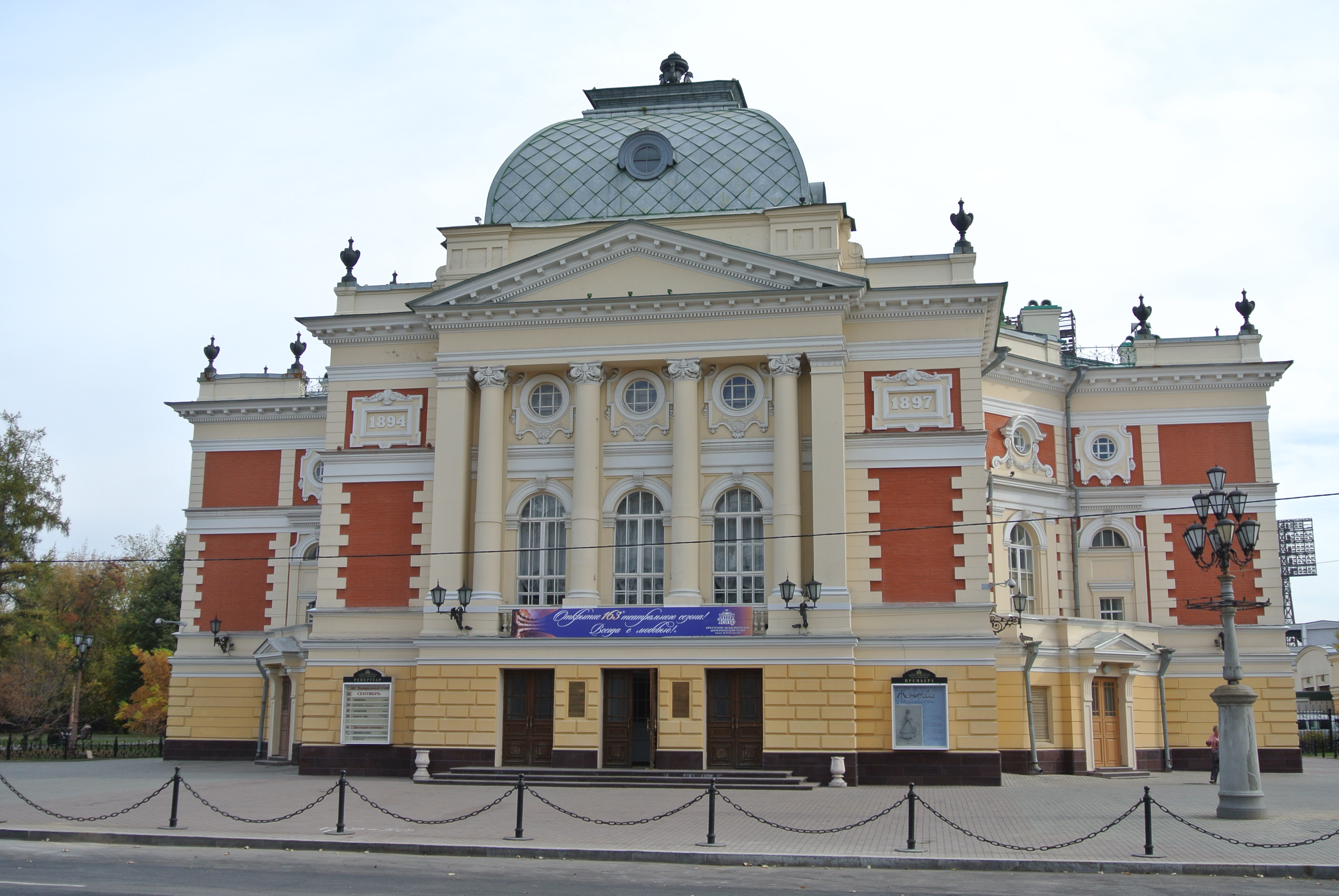
Irkutsk Academic Drama Theater

=== Television and mass media ===
There are state-owned and privately owned television stations in Irkutsk, including state company IGTRK and private ones, such as AS Baikal TV, TV company AIST, TV company Gorod, and also other media outlets, like the VSP Newspaper Agency. There is also a live webcam broadcasting from the city center.

=== Education ===
Irkutsk is home to the East Siberian Education Academy (since 1909), Irkutsk State University (1918), Irkutsk State Medical University (1918), Baykalsky State University of Economics and Law (since 1932), Irkutsk State Technical University (since 1939), Irkutsk State Academy of Agriculture, Irkutsk State Linguistic University (1948), Irkutsk State Railway Transport University (since 1975), and a number of private colleges: Siberian Institute of Law, Economics and Management (since 1993), Institute of Economics of ISTU (since 1996), and others.

=== Science ===
As Irkutsk is within the influence of the Siberian Division of the Russian Academy of Sciences, there are nine research institutes located in the Irkutsk Academgorodok suburb: the Institute of Geography, the Energy System Institute, the Institute of Geochemistry, the Institute of System Dynamics and Control Theory, the Earth's Crust Institute, the Solar-Terrestrial Physics Institute, the Institute of Chemistry, the Limnological Institute (formerly located on Lake Baikal's shore), the Institute of Plant Physics, Laser Physics Institute (a Branch of the Institute of Laser Physics in Novosibirsk). A number of institutes conduct research within Irkutsk State University: the Institute of Biology, the Institute of Oil and Coal Chemistry and Synthesis, the Laboratory of Quantum Chemistry, the Institute of Applied Physics, the Interregional Institute of Social Studies, the Astronomical Observatory, and the Botanical Gardens. The East-Siberian Scientific Center of the Russian Academy of Medical Sciences is also located in Irkutsk and is represented by the following research organizations: the Scientific Center for Medical Ecology, the Institute for Paediatrics and Human Reproduction, the Institute for Microbiology and Epidemiology, the Institute for Medicine of the Workplace and Human Ecology, the Institute of Reconstructive and Restorative Surgery, the Institute of Surgery, and the Institute of Traumatology and Orthopaedics. Also, the Fyodorov Eye Microsurgery Scientific and Technical Center has a branch in Irkutsk. Additionally, there are R&D institutes including GAZPROM R&D Institute (a Branch of a Moscow-based institute), the Irkutsk Institute of Rare and Precious Metals and Diamonds (Irgiredmet), part of the Petropavlovsk Group of Companies., and the Vostoksibacademcenter of the Russian Academy of Architecture and Construction Sciences that publishes the Project Baikal journal.

=== Literature ===
Irkutsk plays a crucial role in Jules Verne's 1876 novel Michael Strogoff. In the novel Strogoff is the heroic courier of the Czar Alexander II entrusted with delivering a critical dispatch to the Czar's brother in Irkutsk with vital information about a rebellion brewing in Siberia. Irkutsk was home to Russian writer Valentin Rasputin; many of his novels and stories take place in the Angara Valley. An essay on the cultural history of Irkutsk (and another one about the nearby Lake Baikal) is included in Rasputin's non-fiction collection Siberia, Siberia, which is also available in an English translation. Irkutsk also figures prominently in descriptions by foreign travelers, including the so-called British "Blind Traveler" James Holman, who was suspected of spying and conducted back forcibly to the frontiers of Poland.

=== Museums ===
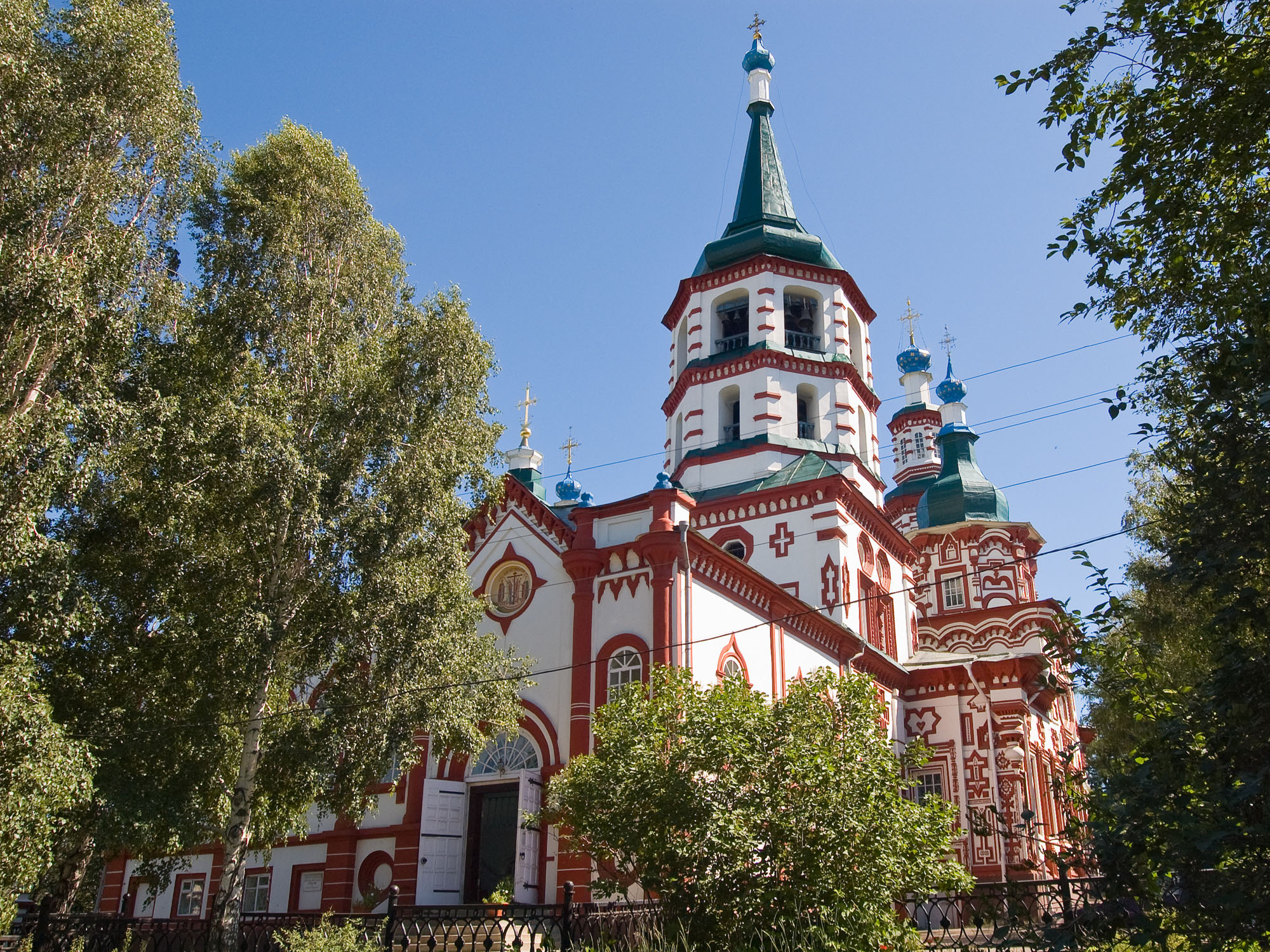
The Church of the Cross (1747–60) is a pinnacle of the Siberian Baroque architecture

Irkutsk is a point of interest for tourists with its numerous museums and old architecture. The Taltsy Museum (Russian: Тальцы), located on the Angara 47 kilometers (29 mi) south of Irkutsk, is an open-air museum of Siberian traditional architecture. Numerous old wooden buildings from villages in the Angara valley, which have been flooded after the construction of the Bratsk Dam and Ust-Ilimsk Dam, have been transported to the museum and reassembled there. One of the centerpieces of the collection is a partial recreation of the 17th-century ostrog (fortress) of Ilimsk, which consists of the original Spasskaya Tower and the Church of Our Lady of Kazan transported from the flooded ostrog in the mid-1970s, to which an exact modern copy of another tower of the ostrog and the Southern wall of the fortress were added in the early 2000s.

The Botanic Garden of the Irkutsk State University known as the "Irkutsk Botanic Garden" is the only botanic garden as a living museum in Irkutsk Oblast and Baikalian Siberia. Its mission is "to protect and enrich the flora of the Lake Baikal area and the world for people through public education, collection, propagation, research, and conservation of plants". The garden is mainly an educational and scientific tool for the Irkutsk State University and maintains the largest plant collection of living plants in Eastern Siberia (more than 5,000 plant taxa), a herbarium, and a seed bank. It occupies 27 hectares (67 acres) within Irkutsk city, 70 km (43 mi) west of Lake Baikal. It has a federal status of especially protected land and a nature memorial of Irkutsk.

=== Theaters ===
Irkutsk is home to several theaters, including the Okhlopkov Drama Theater, one of Russia's oldest.

== Sports ==
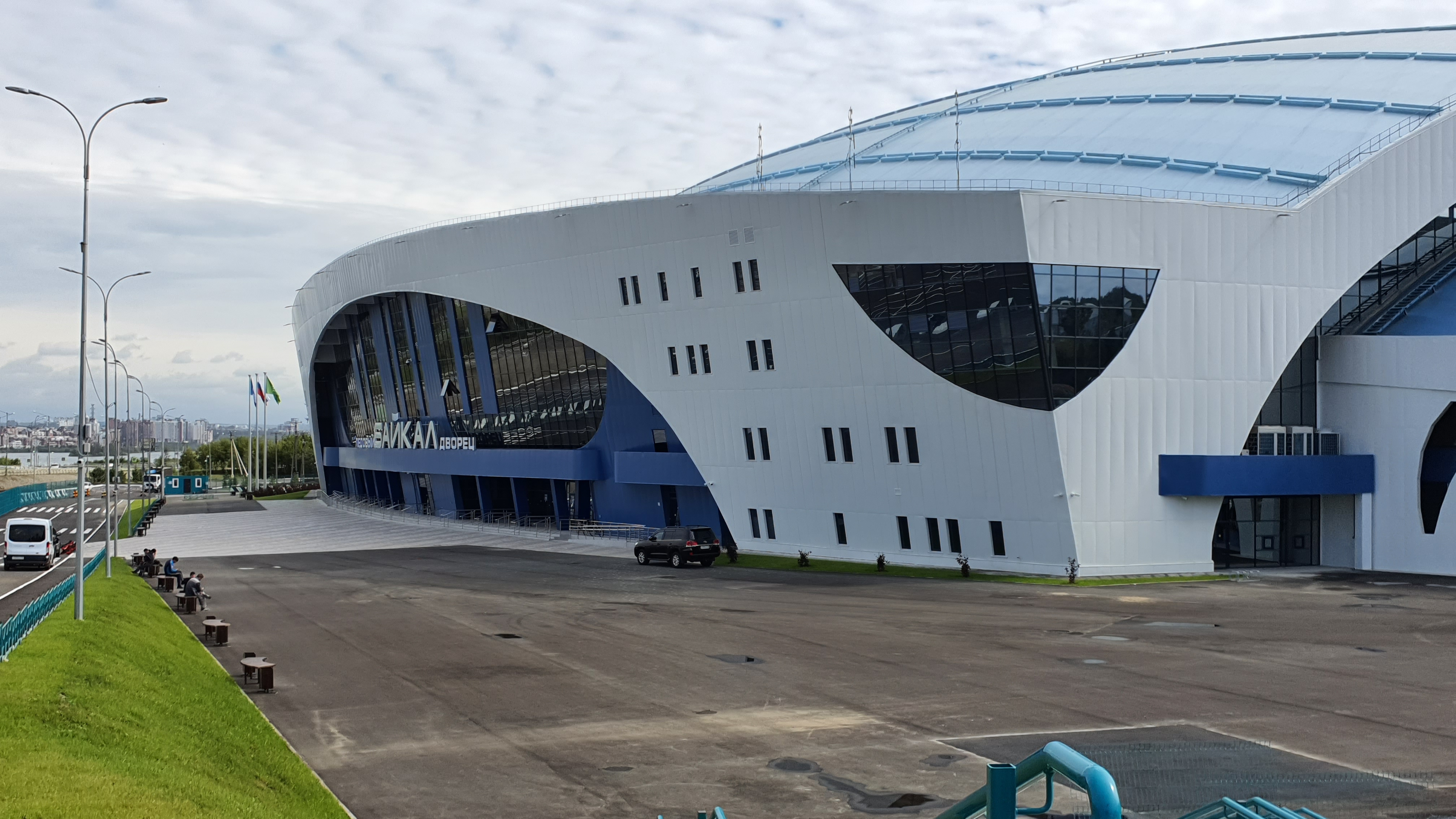
Ice palace

Bandy is popular in the city. There are several clubs, most notably Baykal-Energiya of the Russian Bandy Super League, which can draw spectator crowds of 30,000. It is also the centre of women's bandy in Russia with the club Rekord, which provides most players to the national team. In the 2019 national championship, four teams were from Irkutsk and only two were from the rest of the country.

In Irkutsk, there are 384 sports facilities, of which 200 are municipal ones. Among them there are 23 swimming pools, 14 ski bases, a sports palace, 154 courts, 165 gyms, an athletics arena, a racetrack, 7 stadiums—Trud, Rekord, Dynamo, Zenit, Aviator, Lokomotiv-2, sports complex of Irktusk and the main football arena—Lokomotiv.

2012 Women's Bandy World Championship was hosted in Irkutsk and received praise from Federation of International Bandy. 2014 Bandy World Championship was played in the city. The final of Russian Bandy Super League 2016 was played at Rekord Stadium. The 2019 Bandy World Championship was scheduled to also be hosted in Irkutsk. The decision was reconsidered, though. Then it was thought that Irkutsk might get the right to host the 2020 tournament instead, if FIB was given guarantees that the planned indoor arena would be ready for use in time. It will also be an indoor speed skating arena. Its construction started in October 2018 and is expected to be ready for use by March 2020, just in time for the Bandy World Championship.

== Twin towns – sister cities ==
Irkutsk is twinned with:

- Częstochowa, Poland
- Eugene, United States (suspended in 2022)
- Gangneung, South Korea
- Haute-Savoie, France
- Kanazawa, Japan
- Karlovy Vary, Czech Republic
- Pforzheim, Germany
- Pordenone Province, Italy
- Prijedor, Bosnia and Herzegovina
- Primorje-Gorski Kotar County, Croatia
- Shenyang, China
- Strömsund, Sweden
- Ulaanbaatar, Mongolia
- Vitebsk, Belarus

== Notable people ==
- Nikolai Polevoy (1796–1846), editor, writer, translator and historian
- Innocent of Alaska (1797-1879), archbishop, linguist, architect, missionary
- Vladimir Kornilov (1806–1854), naval officer who took part in the Crimean War
- Alexei Pavlovich Fedchenko (1844–1873), naturalist and explorer
- Vladimir Shevyakov (1859–1930), Russian biologist who died in Irkutsk
- Nikolay Vtorov (1866–1918), industrialist
- Alexander Kolchak (1874–1920) Russian Civil War leader, executed at Irkutsk
- Nikolay Okhlopkov (1900–1967), Soviet actor and theatre director
- Mikhail Romm (1901–1971), Soviet film director
- Nikolay Kamov (1902–1973), leading constructor of the Soviet-Russian Kamov helicopter design bureau
- Mikhail Mil (1909–1970), Soviet aerospace engineer
- Konstantin Vyrupayev (1930–2012), Soviet wrestler and Olympic Champion
- Boris Volynov (born 1934), Soviet cosmonaut
- Alexander Vampilov (1937–1972), Soviet playwright
- Rudolf Nureyev (1938–1993), Soviet ballet and contemporary dancer and choreographer
- Olga Buyanova (born 1954), Honored Master of Sports coach in Rhythmic gymnastics of the USSR and Russia
- Oleksandr Shlapak (born 1960), Ukrainian politician, bureaucrat, and former Minister of Finance of Ukraine
- Anatoli Ivanishin (born 1969), cosmonaut
- Oxana Kostina (1972–1993), Soviet individual rhythmic gymnast
- Aleksandr Averbukh (born 1974), Israeli Olympic athlete who competed in the pole vault
- Denis Matsuev (born 1975), classical pianist
- Maria Bruntseva (born 1980), volleyball player
- Nina Kraviz (born 1982), DJ, musician, producer
- Olga Zhitova (born 1983), volleyball player
- Olga Kurban (born 1987), heptathlete
- Alexey Negodaylo (born 1989), bobsledder
- Angelina Zhuk-Krasnova (born 1991), athlete specializing in the pole vault
- Darya Dmitriyeva (born 1993), Russian rhythmic gymnast
- Nazí Paikidze (born 1993), Georgian-American chess player
- Ekaterina Vedeneeva (born 1994), Russian-Slovenian rhythmic gymnast

== See also ==
- Immaculate Heart of Mary Cathedral, Irkutsk
- Irkutskoye Slovo
