= Vorobyevka, Vladimir Oblast =

Vorobyevka Воробьёвка
- Village
- Location within Vladimir Oblast Location within Russia
- Coordinates: 56°09′N 42°08′E
- Country: Russia
- Region: Vladimir Oblast
- District: Vyaznikovsky District
- Time zone: UTC+3:00

Vorobyevka (Russian: Воробьёвка) is a rural locality (a village) in Paustovskoye Rural Settlement, Vyaznikovsky District, Vladimir Oblast, Russia. The population was 310 as of 2010. There are 3 streets.

== Geography ==
Vorobyevka is located 15 km south of Vyazniki (the district's administrative centre) by road. Krutye is the nearest rural locality.
