= Tikhonovka, Republic of Bashkortostan =

Tikhonovka Тихоновка
- Village
- Location within Bashkortostan Location within Russia
- Coordinates: 53°16′N 55°36′E
- Country: Russia
- Region: Bashkortostan
- District: Meleuzovsky District
- Time zone: UTC+5:00

Tikhonovka (Russian: Тихоновка) is a rural locality (a village) in Korneyevsky Selsoviet, Meleuzovsky District, Bashkortostan, Russia. The population was 59 as of 2010. There is 1 street.

== Geography ==
Tikhonovka is located 59 km northwest of Meleuz (the district's administrative centre) by road. Nordovka is the nearest rural locality.
