= Bokhan (rural locality) =

Rural locality in Irkutsk Oblast, Russia

Coordinates: 53°09′11″N 103°46′35″E

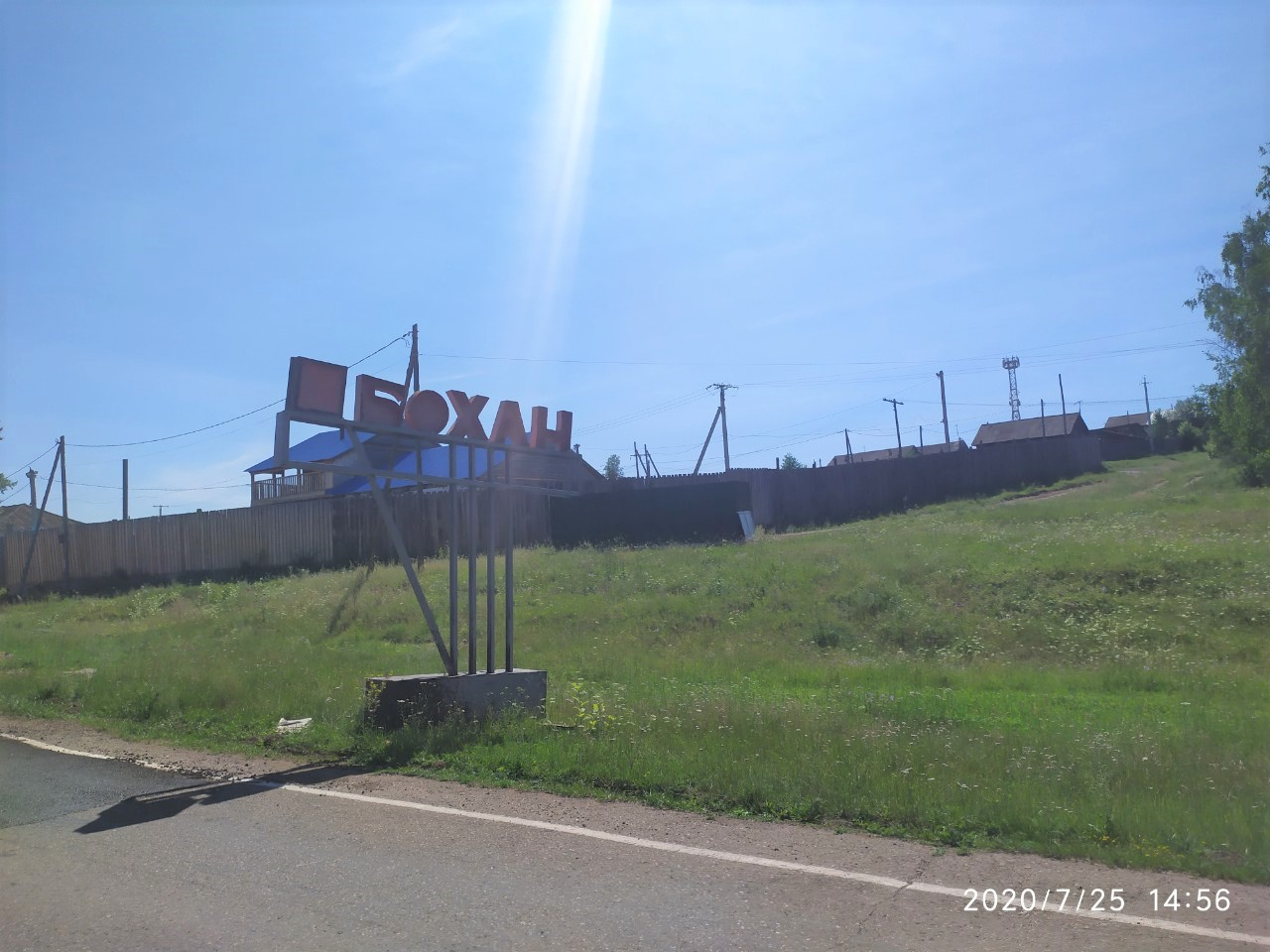
The road to the village of Bokhan

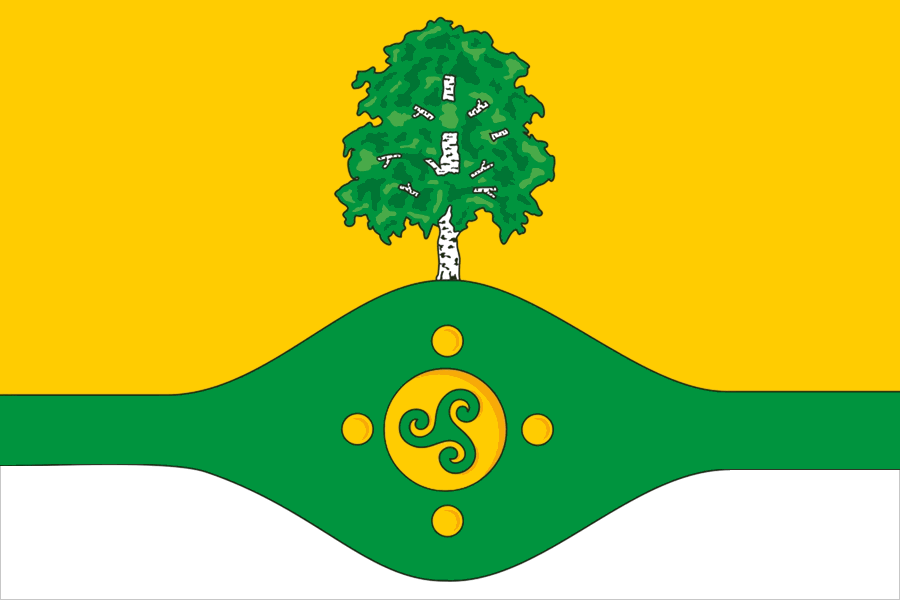
Flag of Bokhan

Bokhan (Russian: Бохан, Buryat: Боохон, Bookhon) is a rural locality (a settlement) and the administrative center of Bokhansky District of Ust-Orda Buryat Okrug, Irkutsk Oblast, Russia. Population: 5,169 (2010 census); 5,425 (2002 census); 5,040 (1989 Soviet census).
