= Irkutsk Time =

Time zone in Russia (UTC+8)

- Time zone

UTC offset
- IRKT: UTC+08:00

Current time
- 11:11, 6 January 2026 IRKT [refresh]

Observance of DST
- DST is not observed in this time zone.

Time in Russia: KALT / Kaliningrad Time / UTC+2 / (MSK−1); MSK / Moscow Time / UTC+3 / (MSK±0); SAMT / Samara Time / UTC+4 / (MSK+1); YEKT / Yekaterinburg Time / UTC+5 / (MSK+2); OMST / Omsk Time / UTC+6 / (MSK+3); KRAT / Krasnoyarsk Time / UTC+7 / (MSK+4); IRKT / Irkutsk Time / UTC+8 / (MSK+5); YAKT / Yakutsk Time / UTC+9 / (MSK+6); VLAT / Vladivostok Time / UTC+10 / (MSK+7); MAGT / Magadan Time / UTC+11 / (MSK+8); PETT / Kamchatka Time / UTC+12 / (MSK+9)

Irkutsk Time (IRKT) is the time zone eight hours ahead of UTC (UTC+08:00) and 5 hours ahead of Moscow Time (MSK+5).

The time zone covers Buryatia and Irkutsk Oblast.

On 27 March 2011, Russia moved to year-round daylight saving time. Instead of switching between UTC+08:00 in winter and UTC+09:00 in summer, Irkutsk Time became fixed at UTC+09:00 until 2014, when it was reset back to UTC+08:00 year-round.

== IANA time zone database ==
In the zone.tab of the IANA time zone database, the zone with the same current offset is:

| c.c. | Coordinates | Timezone name | Comments | UTC offset |
|---|---|---|---|---|
| RU | +5216+10420 | Asia/Irkutsk | MSK+05 – Irkutsk, Buryatia | +08:00 |

== See also ==
- Time in Russia
