= Bokhansky District =

Bokhansky District Боханский район (Russian)
- District
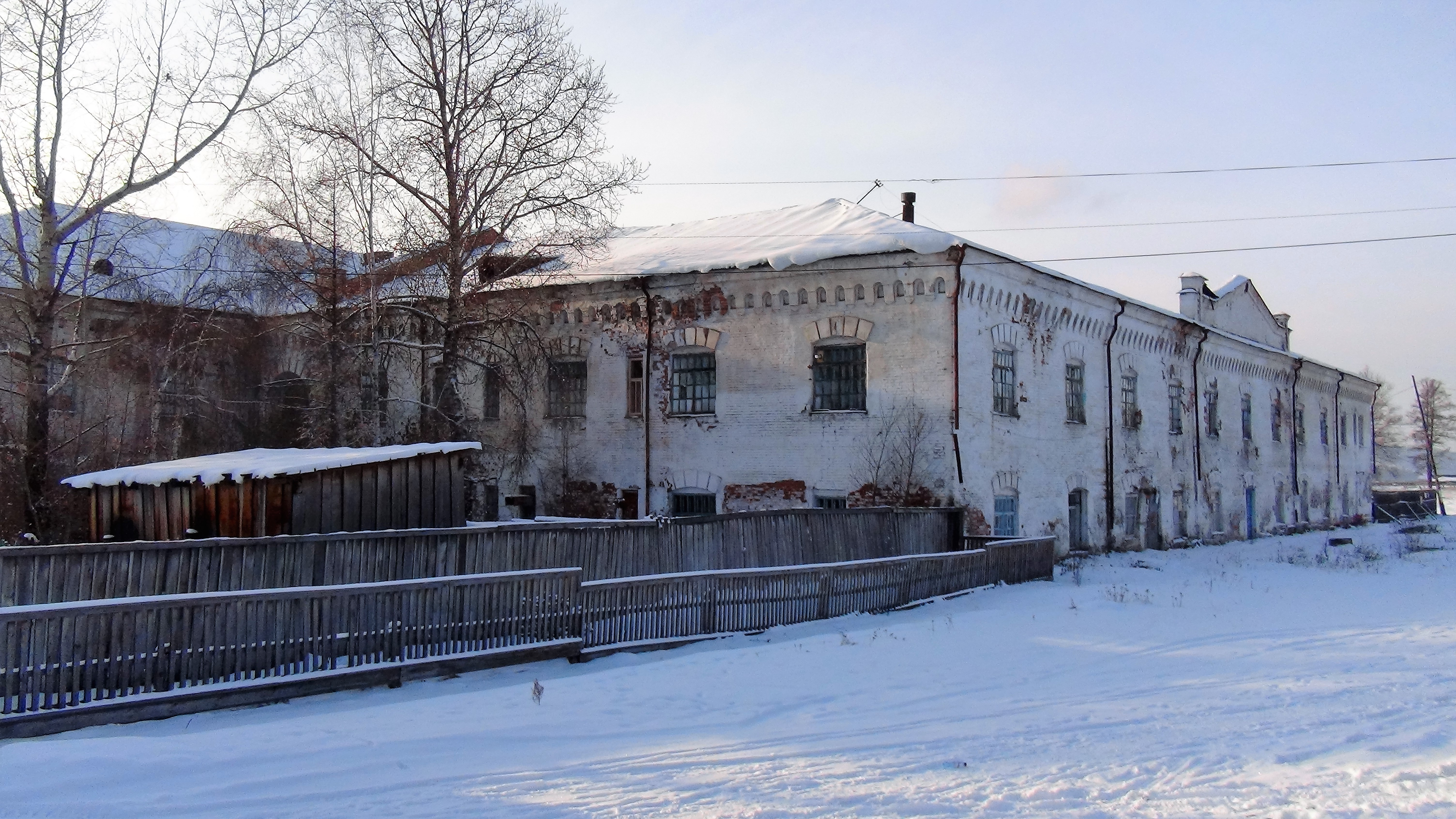
- Ruins of Alexandrov Central Convict Prison, used by Russian Empire during 1873-1920, Bokhansky District

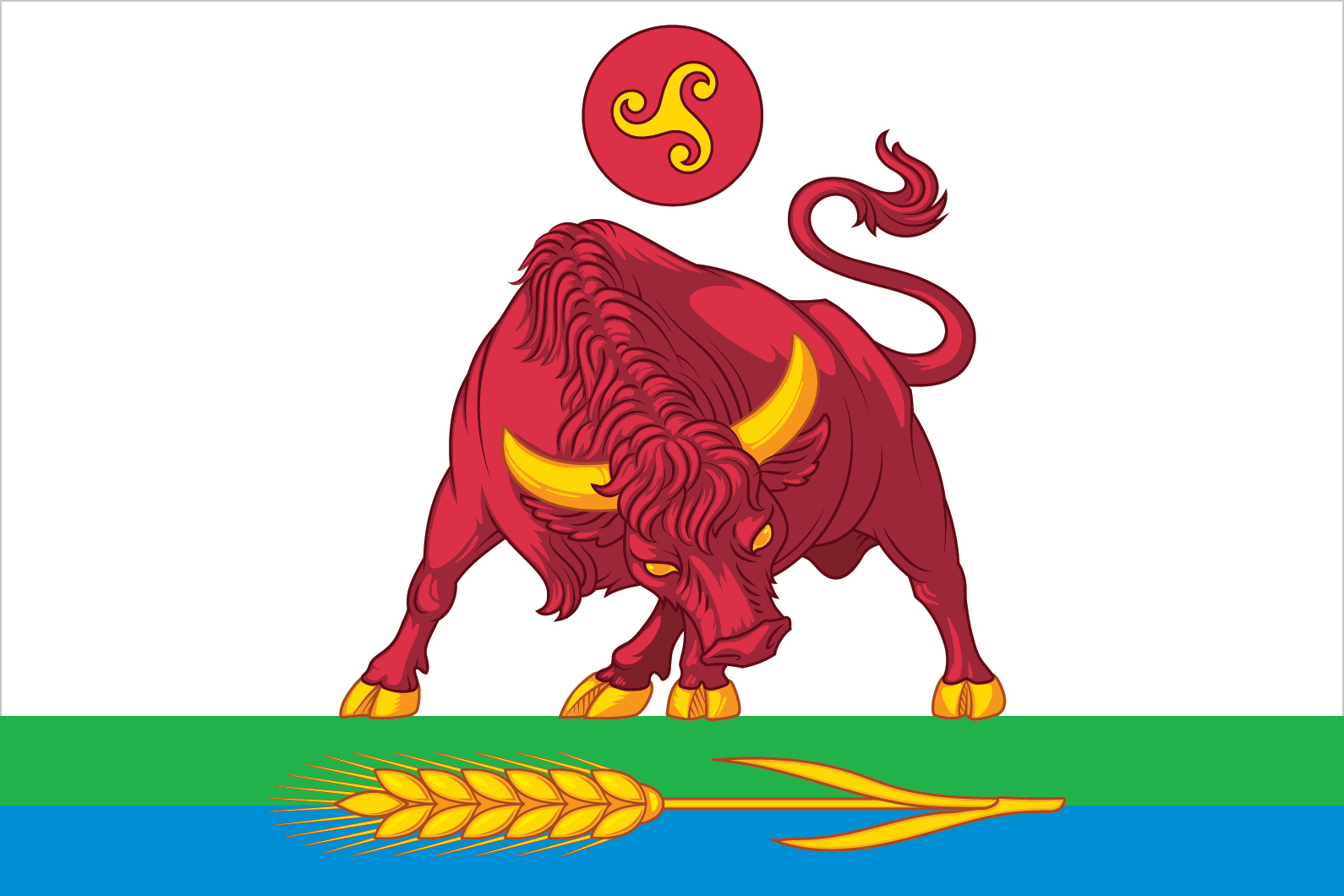
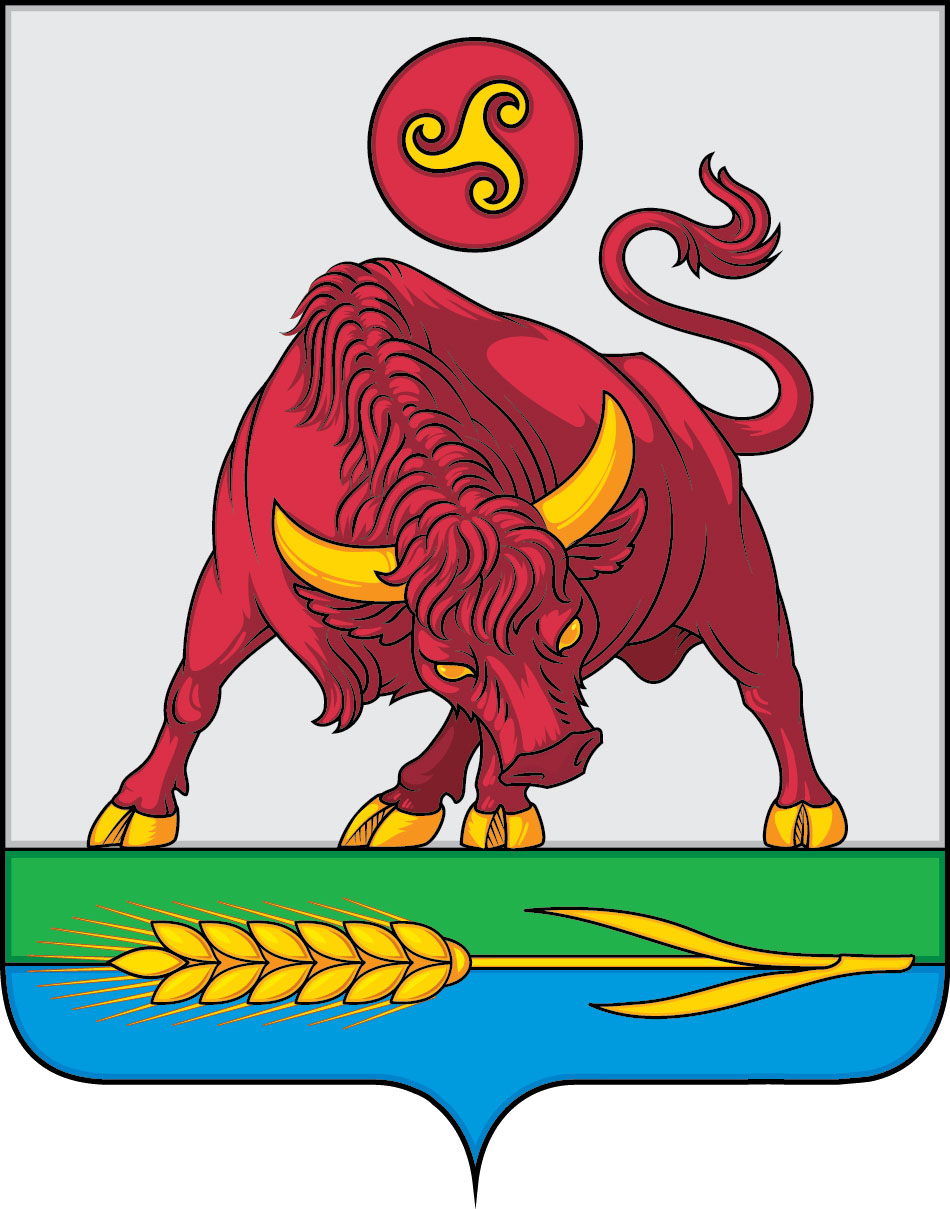
- Flag Coat of arms
- Location of Bokhansky District in Ust-Orda Buryat Okrug, Irkutsk Oblast
- Coordinates: 53°09′N 103°47′E
- Country: Russia
- Federal subject: Irkutsk Oblast
- Established: 1922
- Administrative center: Bokhan

Area
  - Total: 3,700 km^{2} (1,400 sq mi)

Population (2010 Census)
  - Total: 25,398
  - Density: 6.9/km^{2} (18/sq mi)
  - Urban: 0%
  - Rural: 100%

Administrative structure
  - Inhabited localities: 72 rural localities

Municipal structure
  - Municipally incorporated as: Bokhansky Municipal District
  - Municipal divisions: 0 urban settlements, 13 rural settlements
- Time zone: UTC+8 (MSK+5)
- OKTMO ID: 25609000
- Website: http://bohan.irkobl.ru

Bokhansky District (Russian: Боханский райо́н; Buryat: Боохоной аймаг, Bookhonoi aimag) is an administrative district of Ust-Orda Buryat Okrug of Irkutsk Oblast, Russia, one of the thirty-three in the oblast. Municipally, it is incorporated as Bokhansky Municipal District. It is located in the south of the oblast. The area of the district is 3,700 square kilometers (1,400 sq mi). Its administrative center is the rural locality (a settlement) of Bokhan. Population: 25,398 (2010 census); 26,897 (2002 Census); 26,722 (1989 Soviet census). The population of Bokhan accounts for 20.4% of the district's total population.
