= List of rural localities in Irkutsk Oblast =

Map of Russia with Irkutsk Oblast highlighted

This is a list of rural localities in Irkutsk Oblast. Irkutsk Oblast (Russian: Ирку́тская о́бласть, Irkutskaya oblast) is a federal subject of Russia (an oblast), located in southeastern Siberia in the basins of the Angara, Lena, and Nizhnyaya Tunguska Rivers. The administrative center is the city of Irkutsk. Population: 2,428,750 (2010 Census).

== Alarsky District ==
Rural localities in Alarsky District:

- Alar
- Aleksandrovsk
- Alyaty
- Alzobey
- Angarsky
- Apkhayta
- Apkhulta
- Arshan
- Baltuy
- Bakhtay
- Berestennikova
- Bolshaya Yerma
- Burkova
- Buryatskaya
- Bykovo
- Duta
- Golovinskoye
- Gotol
- Ideal
- Ikinat
- Ivanicheskoye
- Ivanova
- Kerbulak
- Khalta
- Khalty
- Khiginskaya
- Khuruy
- Kirkey
- Kiryushina
- Klyuchi
- Korkhovskaya
- Kukunur
- Kundulun
- Kurkat
- Kutulik
- Kuyta
- Maloluchinsk
- Malomoleva
- Maly Kutulik
- Manilovskaya
- Marday
- Mogoy
- Mogoyonok
- Molta
- Nareny
- Nelkhay
- Nygda
- Omulyovka
- Otradnaya
- Shakhovskaya
- Shaloty
- Shapshaltuy
- Shastina
- Shelemina
- Shulgina
- Tabarsuk
- Tyrgetuy
- Tyutrina
- Ugolnaya
- Ulzet
- Under-Khuan
- Vershina
- Vysotskaya
- Yegorovskaya
- Zabituy
- Zanina
- Zarechnoye
- Zhlobina
- Zony

== Angarsky District ==
Rural localities in Angarsky District:

- Chebogory
- Ivanovka
- Klyuchevaya
- Meget
- Novoodinsk
- Odinsk
- Savvateyevka
- Steklyanka
- Udarnik
- Yakimovka
- Zuy
- Zverevo
- Zvyozdochka

== Balagansky District ==
Rural localities in Balagansky District:

- Anuchinsk
- Konovalovo
- Kumareyka
- Odisa
- Sharagay
- Tarasovsk
- Tashlykova
- Zaslavskaya

== Bayandayevsky District ==
Rural localities in Bayandayevsky District:

- Badaguy
- Bakhay 1-y
- Bakhay 2-y
- Bayanday
- Baysha
- Bokholdoy
- Dukhovshchina
- Idygey
- Kayzaran
- Khandabay
- Khandagay
- Kharagun
- Khatar-Khaday
- Khiney
- Khogot
- Khotogor
- Kokorina
- Lidinskaya
- Lyury
- Maraltuy
- Moloy
- Nagalyk
- Nagatay
- Naumovka
- Nukhu-Nur
- Olzony
- Ongoy
- Pokrovka
- Polovinka
- Shamanka
- Shekhargun
- Shitkhulun
- Stary Khogot
- Tolstovka
- Tukhum
- Turgenevka
- Typkysyr
- Ulan
- Vasilyevka
- Vershininsk
- Yeleninsk
- Zagatuy
- Zangut

== Bodaybinsky District ==
Rural localities in Bodaybinsky District:

- Aprelsk
- Kyakhtinsky
- Marakan
- Nerpo
- Perevoz
- Svetly
- Vasilyevsky

== Bokhansky District ==
Rural localities in Bokhansky District:

- Aleksandrovskoye
- Bazoy
- Bokhan
- Bulyk
- Byrgazova
- Chernigovskaya
- Chilim
- Donskaya
- Grekhnevka
- Gryaznaya
- Ida
- Kalashnikova
- Kamenka
- Kartygey
- Kazachye
- Khandagay
- Kharatirgen
- Kheretin
- Khokhorsk
- Khorgelok
- Klyuchi
- Kryukova
- Kulakova
- Lavrentyevsk
- Loganova
- Makarovskaya
- Mankova
- Morozova
- Mutinova
- Novaya Ida
- Novovoskresenka
- Novy Alendar
- Olonki
- Paramonovka
- Pashkova
- Petrogranovka
- Rusinovka
- Seredkino
- Sharagun
- Shipnyagovka
- Shunta
- Sklyanka
- Tachigir
- Tarasa
- Tikhonovka
- Tymyrey
- Ugolnaya
- Ukyr
- Usolye-Zhilkino
- Ust-Tarasa
- Ust-Ukyr
- Vanteyevskaya
- Vesyolaya Polyana
- Vorobyevka
- Yershova
- Zaglik
- Zakharovskaya

== Bratsky District ==
Rural localities in Bratsky District:

- Aleksandrovka
- Anchirikova
- Bada
- Bambuy
- Barchim
- Bolsheokinskoye
- Borovskoy
- Bulak
- Dobchur
- Dubynino
- Ilir
- Kaltuk
- Karakhun
- Karay
- Kardoy
- Kezhemsky
- Klyuchi-Bulak
- Kob
- Koblyakovo
- Kumeyka
- Kuvatka
- Kuznetsovka
- Leonova
- Lugovoy
- Mamyr
- Naratay
- Novoye Prirechye
- Oktyabrsky
- Ozyorny
- Pashenny
- Podvyezdny
- Pokosnoye
- Priboyny
- Pribrezhny
- Sakhorovo
- Zarb
- Zyaba

== Chunsky District ==
Rural localities in Chunsky District:

- Nevanka

== Ekhirit-Bulagatsky District ==
Rural localities in Ekhirit-Bulagatsky District:

- Ust-Ordynsky

== Irkutsky District ==
Rural localities in Irkutsky District:

- Dobrolet
- Mamony
- Urik

== Kachugsky District ==
Rural localities in Kachugsky District:

- Biryulka
- Bolshiye Goly

== Katangsky District ==
Rural localities in Katangsky District:

- Yerbogachen

== Kazachinsko-Lensky District ==
Rural localities in Kazachinsko-Lensky District:

- Kazachinskoye

== Kirensky District ==
Rural localities in Kirensky District:

- Ichera

== Listvyanka urban locality ==
Rural localities in Listvyanka urban locality:

- Bolshiye Koty

== Nizhneudinsky District ==
Rural localities in Nizhneudinsky District:

- Abalakovo
- Alygdzher

== Nukutsky District ==
Rural localities in Nukutsky District:

- Novonukutsky

== Olkhonsky District ==
Rural localities in Olkhonsky District:

- Peschanaya
- Khuzhir
- Kharantsy
- Sakhyurta
- Uzury
- Yelantsy

== Osinsky District ==
Rural localities in Osinsky District:

- Abramovka
- Osa

== Slyudyansky District ==
Rural localities in Slyudyansky District:

- Baykal

== Tulunsky District ==
Rural localities in Tulunsky District:

- 1st Otdelenie Gosudarstvennoy Selektsionnoy Stantsii
- 4th Otdelenie Gosudarstvennoy Selektsionnoy Stantsii

== Usolsky District, Irkutsk Oblast ==
Rural localities in Usolsky District, Irkutsk Oblast:

- Baday

== Ust-Udinsky District ==
Rural localities in Ust-Udinsky District:

- Novaya Uda

== See also ==
- Lists of rural localities in Russia
