= Kuznetsovka, Bratsky District =

Kuznetsovka Кузнецовка
- Village
- Location within Irkutsk Oblast Location within Russia
- Coordinates: 56°05′N 101°14′E
- Country: Russia
- Region: Irkutsk Oblast
- District: Bratsky District
- Time zone: UTC+8:00

Kuznetsovka (Russian: Кузнецовка) is a rural locality (a selo) in Bratsky District, Irkutsk Oblast, Russia. Population: 1,113 (2010 census);

== Geography ==
This rural locality is located 25 kilometres (16 mi) from Bratsk (the district's administrative centre), 463 kilometres (288 mi) from Irkutsk (capital of Irkutsk Oblast) and 3,947 kilometres (2,453 mi) from Moscow. Bambuy is the nearest rural locality.
