= Khandagay, Bokhansky District =

Khandagay Хандагай
- Village
- Location within Irkutsk Oblast Location within Russia
- Coordinates: 53°09′N 103°37′E
- Country: Russia
- Region: Irkutsk Oblast
- District: Bokhansky District
- Time zone: UTC+8:00

Khandagay (Russian: Хандагай) is a rural locality (a village) in Bokhansky District, Irkutsk Oblast, Russia. Population: 232 (2010 census);

== Geography ==
This rural locality is located 10 kilometres (6.2 mi) from Bokhan (the district's administrative centre), 107 kilometres (66 mi) from Irkutsk (capital of Irkutsk Oblast) and 4,410 kilometres (2,740 mi) from Moscow. Novaya Ida is the nearest rural locality.
