= Novovoskresenka =

Novovoskresenka Нововоскресенка
- Village
- Location within Irkutsk Oblast Location within Russia
- Coordinates: 53°09′N 104°01′E
- Country: Russia
- Region: Irkutsk Oblast
- District: Bokhansky District
- Time zone: UTC+8:00

Novovoskresenka (Russian: Нововоскресенка) is a rural locality (a village) in Bokhansky District, Irkutsk Oblast, Russia. Population: 135 (2010 census);

== Geography ==
This rural locality is located 16 kilometres (9.9 mi) from Bokhan (the district's administrative centre), 97 kilometres (60 mi) from Irkutsk (capital of Irkutsk Oblast) and 4,438 kilometres (2,758 mi) from Moscow. Mankova is the nearest rural locality.
