= Tukhum, Irkutsk Oblast =

Tukhum Тухум
- Village
- Location within Irkutsk Oblast Location within Russia
- Coordinates: 53°25′N 105°42′E
- Country: Russia
- Region: Irkutsk Oblast
- District: Bayandayevsky District
- Time zone: UTC+8:00

Tukhum (Russian: Тухум) is a rural locality (a village) in Bayandayevsky District, Irkutsk Oblast, Russia. Population: 84 (2010 census);

== Geography ==
This rural locality is located 43 kilometres (27 mi) from Bayanday (the district's administrative centre), 158 kilometres (98 mi) from Irkutsk (capital of Irkutsk Oblast) and 4,520 kilometres (2,810 mi) from Moscow. Nagatay is the nearest rural locality.
