= Mogoyonok =

Mogoyonok Могоёнок
- Village
- Location within Irkutsk Oblast Location within Russia
- Coordinates: 53°23′N 102°51′E
- Country: Russia
- Region: Irkutsk Oblast
- District: Alarsky District
- Time zone: UTC+8:00

Mogoyonok (Russian: Могоёнок) is a rural locality (a selo) in Alarsky District, Irkutsk Oblast, Russia. Population: 496 (2010 census);

== Geography ==
This rural locality is located 7 kilometres (4.3 mi) from Kutulik (the district's administrative centre), 154 kilometres (96 mi) from Irkutsk (capital of Irkutsk Oblast) and 4,335 kilometres (2,694 mi) from Moscow. Mogoy is the nearest rural locality.
