= Bakhay 2-y =

Bakhay 2-y Бахай 2-й
- Village
- Location within Irkutsk Oblast Location within Russia
- Coordinates: 52°57′N 105°27′E
- Country: Russia
- Region: Irkutsk Oblast
- District: Bayandayevsky District
- Time zone: UTC+8:00

Bakhay 2-y (Russian: Бахай 2-й) is a rural locality (a village) in Bayandayevsky District, Irkutsk Oblast, Russia. Population: 22 (2010 census);

== Geography ==
This rural locality is located 11 kilometres (6.8 mi) from Bayanday (the district's administrative centre), 109 kilometres (68 mi) from Irkutsk (capital of Irkutsk Oblast) and 4,554 kilometres (2,830 mi) from Moscow. Bokholdoy is the nearest rural locality.
