= Pokosnoye =

Pokosnoye Покосное
- Village
- Location within Irkutsk Oblast Location within Russia
- Coordinates: 55°31′N 101°03′E
- Country: Russia
- Region: Irkutsk Oblast
- District: Bratsky District
- Time zone: UTC+8:00

Pokosnoye (Russian: Покосное) is a rural locality (a selo) in Bratsky District, Irkutsk Oblast, Russia. Population: 2,998 (2010 census); 3.193 (2002 census);

== Geography ==
This rural locality is located 79 kilometres (49 mi) from Bratsk (the district's administrative centre), 413 kilometres (257 mi) from Irkutsk (capital of Irkutsk Oblast) and 3,993 kilometres (2,481 mi) from Moscow. Zarb is the nearest rural locality.
