= Baltuy, Irkutsk Oblast =

Baltuy Балтуй
- Village
- Location within Irkutsk Oblast Location within Russia
- Coordinates: 53°19′N 103°19′E
- Country: Russia
- Region: Irkutsk Oblast
- District: Alarsky District
- Time zone: UTC+8:00

Baltuy (Russian: Балтуй) is a rural locality (a village) in Alarsky District, Irkutsk Oblast, Russia. Population: 89 (2010 census);

== Geography ==
This rural locality is located 35 kilometres (22 mi) from Kutulik (the district's administrative centre), 132 kilometres (82 mi) from Irkutsk (capital of Irkutsk Oblast) and 4,372 kilometres (2,717 mi) from Moscow. Tyrgetuy is the nearest rural locality.
