= Khogot =

Khogot Хогот
- Village
- Location within Irkutsk Oblast Location within Russia
- Coordinates: 53°14′N 105°52′E
- Country: Russia
- Region: Irkutsk Oblast
- District: Bayandayevsky District
- Time zone: UTC+8:00

Khogot (Russian: Хогот) is a rural locality (a selo) in Bayandayevsky District, Irkutsk Oblast, Russia. Population: 861 (2010 census);

== Geography ==
This rural locality is located 31 kilometres (19 mi) from Balagansk (the district's administrative centre), 149 kilometres (93 mi) from Irkutsk (capital of Irkutsk Oblast) and 4,550 kilometres (2,830 mi) from Moscow. Dukhovshchina is the nearest rural locality.
