= Zaglik, Bokhansky District =

Zaglik Заглик
- Village
- Location within Irkutsk Oblast Location within Russia
- Coordinates: 53°10′N 103°45′E
- Country: Russia
- Region: Irkutsk Oblast
- District: Bokhansky District
- Time zone: UTC+8:00

Zaglik (Russian: Заглик) is a rural locality (a village) in Bokhansky District, Irkutsk Oblast, Russia. Population: 250 (2010 census);

== Geography ==
This rural locality is located 3 kilometres (1.9 mi) from Bokhan (the district's administrative centre), 105 kilometres (65 mi) from Irkutsk (capital of Irkutsk Oblast) and 4,417 kilometres (2,745 mi) from Moscow. Ust-Tarasa is the nearest rural locality.
