= Rusinovka =

Rusinovka Русиновка
- Village
- Location within Irkutsk Oblast Location within Russia
- Coordinates: 53°07′N 103°58′E
- Country: Russia
- Region: Irkutsk Oblast
- District: Bokhansky District
- Time zone: UTC+8:00

Rusinovka (Russian: Русиновка) is a rural locality (a village) in Bokhansky District, Irkutsk Oblast, Russia. Population: 255 (2010 census);

== Geography ==
This rural locality is located 13 kilometres (8.1 mi) from Bokhan (the district's administrative centre), 96 kilometres (60 mi) from Irkutsk (capital of Irkutsk Oblast) and 4,436 kilometres (2,756 mi) from Moscow. Novovoskresenka is the nearest rural locality.
