= Sharagay =

Sharagay Шарагай
- Village
- Location within Irkutsk Oblast Location within Russia
- Coordinates: 54°19′N 103°04′E
- Country: Russia
- Region: Irkutsk Oblast
- District: Balagansky District
- Time zone: UTC+8:00

Sharagay (Russian: Шарагай) is a rural locality (a selo) in Balagansky District, Irkutsk Oblast, Russia. Population: 547 (2010 census);

== Geography ==
This rural locality is located 35 kilometres (22 mi) from Balagansk (the district's administrative centre), 240 kilometres (150 mi) from Irkutsk (capital of Irkutsk Oblast) and 4,247 kilometres (2,639 mi) from Moscow. Svetlolobovo is the nearest rural locality.
