= Badaguy =

Badaguy Бадагуй
- Village
- Location within Irkutsk Oblast Location within Russia
- Coordinates: 53°01′N 105°17′E
- Country: Russia
- Region: Irkutsk Oblast
- District: Bayandayevsky District
- Time zone: UTC+8:00

Badaguy (Russian: Бадагуй) is a rural locality (a village) in Bayandayevsky District, Irkutsk Oblast, Russia. Population: 280 (2010 census);

== Geography ==
This rural locality is located 15 kilometres (9.3 mi) from Bayanday (the district's administrative centre), 106 kilometres (66 mi) from Irkutsk (capital of Irkutsk Oblast) and 4,537 kilometres (2,819 mi) from Moscow. Moloy is the nearest rural locality.
