= Omulyovka, Irkutsk Oblast =

Omulyovka Омулёвка
- Village
- Location within Irkutsk Oblast Location within Russia
- Coordinates: 53°15′N 102°47′E
- Country: Russia
- Region: Irkutsk Oblast
- District: Alarsky District
- Time zone: UTC+8:00

Omulyovka (Russian: Омулёвка) is a rural locality (a village) in Alarsky District, Irkutsk Oblast, Russia. Population: 58 (2010 census);

== Geography ==
This rural locality is located 10 kilometres (6.2 mi) from Kutulik (the district's administrative centre), 147 kilometres (91 mi) from Irkutsk (capital of Irkutsk Oblast) and 4,344 kilometres (2,699 mi) from Moscow. Zabituy is the nearest rural locality.
