= Zanina, Irkutsk Oblast =

Zanina Занина
- Village
- Location within Irkutsk Oblast Location within Russia
- Coordinates: 53°25′N 102°36′E
- Country: Russia
- Region: Irkutsk Oblast
- District: Alarsky District
- Time zone: UTC+8:00

Zanina (Russian: Занина) is a rural locality (a village) in Alarsky District, Irkutsk Oblast, Russia. Population: 158 (2010 census);

== Geography ==
This rural locality is located 16 kilometres (9.9 mi) from Kutulik (the district's administrative centre), 168 kilometres (104 mi) from Irkutsk (capital of Irkutsk Oblast) and 4,314 kilometres (2,681 mi) from Moscow. Golovinskoye is the nearest rural locality.
