= Mamyr =

Mamyr Мамырь
- Village
- Location within Irkutsk Oblast Location within Russia
- Coordinates: 56°34′N 102°39′E
- Country: Russia
- Region: Irkutsk Oblast
- District: Bratsky District
- Time zone: UTC+8:00

Mamyr (Russian: Мамырь) is a rural locality (a settlement) in Bratsky District, Irkutsk Oblast, Russia. Population: 543 (2010 census);

== Geography ==
This rural locality is located 79 kilometres (49 mi) from Bratsk (the district's administrative centre), 488 kilometres (303 mi) from Irkutsk (capital of Irkutsk Oblast) and 3,984 kilometres (2,476 mi) from Moscow. Kezhemsky is the nearest rural locality.
