= Bulyk, Bokhansky District =

Bulyk Булык
- Village
- Location within Irkutsk Oblast Location within Russia
- Coordinates: 53°15′N 103°48′E
- Country: Russia
- Region: Irkutsk Oblast
- District: Bokhansky District
- Time zone: UTC+8:00

Bulyk (Russian: Булык) is a rural locality (a village) in Bokhansky District, Irkutsk Oblast, Russia. Population: 132 (2010 census);

== Geography ==
This rural locality is located 12 kilometres (7.5 mi) from Bokhan (the district's administrative centre), 112 kilometres (70 mi) from Irkutsk (capital of Irkutsk Oblast) and 4,412 kilometres (2,741 mi) from Moscow. Zaglik is the nearest rural locality.
