= Lidinskaya =

Lidinskaya Лидинская
- Village
- Location within Irkutsk Oblast Location within Russia
- Coordinates: 53°04′N 105°49′E
- Country: Russia
- Region: Irkutsk Oblast
- District: Bayandayevsky District
- Time zone: UTC+8:00

Lidinskaya (Russian: Лидинская) is a rural locality (a village) in Bayandayevsky District, Irkutsk Oblast, Russia. Population: 85 (2010 census);

== Geography ==
This rural locality is located 21 kilometres (13 mi) from Bayanday (the district's administrative centre), 136 kilometres (85 mi) from Irkutsk (capital of Irkutsk Oblast) and 4,565 kilometres (2,837 mi) from Moscow. Vasilyevka is the nearest rural locality.
