= Kob, Irkutsk Oblast =

Kob Кобь
- Village
- Location within Irkutsk Oblast Location within Russia
- Coordinates: 55°25′N 101°22′E
- Country: Russia
- Region: Irkutsk Oblast
- District: Bratsky District
- Time zone: UTC+8:00

Kob (Russian: Кобь) is a rural locality (a selo) in Bratsky District, Irkutsk Oblast, Russia. Population: 467 (2010 census);

== Geography ==
This rural locality is located 82 kilometres (51 mi) from Bratsk (the district's administrative centre), 395 kilometres (245 mi) from Irkutsk (capital of Irkutsk Oblast) and 4,022 kilometres (2,499 mi) from Moscow. Bada is the nearest rural locality.
