= Maraltuy =

Maraltuy Маралтуй
- Village
- Location within Irkutsk Oblast Location within Russia
- Coordinates: 52°59′N 105°16′E
- Country: Russia
- Region: Irkutsk Oblast
- District: Bayandayevsky District
- Time zone: UTC+8:00

Maraltuy (Russian: Маралтуй) is a rural locality (a village) in Bayandayevsky District, Irkutsk Oblast, Russia. Population: 55 (2010 census);

== Geography ==
This rural locality is located 17 kilometres (11 mi) from Bayanday (the district's administrative centre), 103 kilometres (64 mi) from Irkutsk (capital of Irkutsk Oblast) and 4,538 kilometres (2,820 mi) from Moscow. Idygey is the nearest rural locality.
