= Klyuchi, Bokhansky District =

Klyuchi Ключи
- Village
- Location within Irkutsk Oblast Location within Russia
- Coordinates: 52°48′N 103°47′E
- Country: Russia
- Region: Irkutsk Oblast
- District: Bokhansky District
- Time zone: UTC+8:00

Klyuchi (Russian: Ключи) is a rural locality (a village) in Bokhansky District, Irkutsk Oblast, Russia. Population: 33 (2010 census);

== Geography ==
This rural locality is located 38 kilometres (24 mi) from Bokhan (the district's administrative centre), 67 kilometres (42 mi) from Irkutsk (capital of Irkutsk Oblast) and 4,459 kilometres (2,771 mi) from Moscow. Aleksandrovskoye is the nearest rural locality.
