= Ugolnaya, Bokhansky District =

Ugolnaya Угольная
- Village
- Location within Irkutsk Oblast Location within Russia
- Coordinates: 53°13′N 103°24′E
- Country: Russia
- Region: Irkutsk Oblast
- District: Bokhansky District
- Time zone: UTC+8:00

Ugolnaya (Russian: Угольная) is a rural locality (a village) in Bokhansky District, Irkutsk Oblast, Russia. Population: 102 (2010 census);

== Geography ==
This rural locality is located 26 kilometres (16 mi) from Bokhan (the district's administrative centre), 119 kilometres (74 mi) from Irkutsk (capital of Irkutsk Oblast) and 4,389 kilometres (2,727 mi) from Moscow. Makarovskaya is the nearest rural locality.
