= Kalashnikova, Irkutsk Oblast =

Kalashnikova Калашникова
- Village
- Location within Irkutsk Oblast Location within Russia
- Coordinates: 53°04′N 103°24′E
- Country: Russia
- Region: Irkutsk Oblast
- District: Bokhansky District
- Time zone: UTC+8:00

Kalashnikova (Russian: Калашникова) is a rural locality (a village) in Bokhansky District, Irkutsk Oblast, Russia. Population: 108 (2010 census);

== Geography ==
This rural locality is located 27 kilometres (17 mi) from Bokhan (the district's administrative centre), 106 kilometres (66 mi) from Irkutsk (capital of Irkutsk Oblast) and 4,404 kilometres (2,737 mi) from Moscow. Svirsk is the nearest rural locality.
