= Petrogranovka =

Petrogranovka Петрограновка
- Village
- Location within Irkutsk Oblast Location within Russia
- Coordinates: 53°04′N 101°11′E
- Country: Russia
- Region: Irkutsk Oblast
- District: Bokhansky District
- Time zone: UTC+8:00

Petrogranovka (Russian: Петрограновка) is a rural locality (a village) in Bokhansky District, Irkutsk Oblast, Russia. Population: 183 (2010 census);

== Geography ==
This rural locality is located 29 kilometres (18 mi) from Bokhan (the district's administrative centre), 87 kilometres (54 mi) from Irkutsk (capital of Irkutsk Oblast) and 4,458 kilometres (2,770 mi) from Moscow. Khorgelok is the nearest rural locality.
