= Bada, Irkutsk Oblast =

Bada Бада
- Village
- Location within Irkutsk Oblast Location within Russia
- Coordinates: 55°23′N 101°09′E
- Country: Russia
- Region: Irkutsk Oblast
- District: Bratsky District
- Time zone: UTC+8:00

Bada (Russian: Бада) is a rural locality (a village) in Bratsky District, Irkutsk Oblast, Russia. Population: 238 (2010 census);

== Geography ==
This rural locality is located 89 kilometres (55 mi) from Bratsk (the district's administrative centre), 398 kilometres (247 mi) from Irkutsk (capital of Irkutsk Oblast) and 4,012 kilometres (2,493 mi) from Moscow. Dobchur is the nearest rural locality.
