= Novy Alendar =

Novy Alendar Новый Алендарь
- Village
- Location within Irkutsk Oblast Location within Russia
- Coordinates: 53°06′N 103°40′E
- Country: Russia
- Region: Irkutsk Oblast
- District: Bokhansky District
- Time zone: UTC+8:00

Novy Alendar (Russian: Новый Алендарь) is a rural locality (a village) in Bokhansky District, Irkutsk Oblast, Russia. Population: 140 (2010 census);

== Geography ==
This rural locality is located 9 kilometres (5.6 mi) from Bokhan (the district's administrative centre), 100 kilometres (62 mi) from Irkutsk (capital of Irkutsk Oblast) and 4,419 kilometres (2,746 mi) from Moscow. Khandagay is the nearest rural locality.
