= Novoye Prirechye =

Novoye Prirechye Новое Приречье
- Village
- Location within Irkutsk Oblast Location within Russia
- Coordinates: 55°04′N 101°03′E
- Country: Russia
- Region: Irkutsk Oblast
- District: Bratsky District
- Time zone: UTC+8:00

Novoye Prirechye (Russian: Новое Приречье) is a rural locality (a village) in Bratsky District, Irkutsk Oblast, Russia. Population: 335 (2010 census);

== Geography ==
This rural locality is located 125 kilometres (78 mi) from Bratsk (the district's administrative centre), 372 kilometres (231 mi) from Irkutsk (capital of Irkutsk Oblast) and 4,039 kilometres (2,510 mi) from Moscow. Bulak is the nearest rural locality.
