= Aleksandrovka, Bratsky District =

Aleksandrovka Александровка
- Village
- Location within Irkutsk Oblast Location within Russia
- Coordinates: 55°25′N 100°55′E
- Country: Russia
- Region: Irkutsk Oblast
- District: Bratsky District
- Time zone: UTC+8:00

Aleksandrovka (Russian: Александровка) is a rural locality (a village) in Bratsky District, Irkutsk Oblast, Russia. Population: 594 (2010 census);

== Geography ==
This rural locality is located 92 kilometres (57 mi) from Bratsk (the district's administrative centre), 408 kilometres (254 mi) from Irkutsk (capital of Irkutsk Oblast) and 3,995 kilometres (2,482 mi) from Moscow. Khudobok is the nearest rural locality.
