= Yegorovskaya, Irkutsk Oblast =

Yegorovskaya Егоровская
- Village
- Location within Irkutsk Oblast Location within Russia
- Coordinates: 53°18′N 103°00′E
- Country: Russia
- Region: Irkutsk Oblast
- District: Alarsky District
- Time zone: UTC+8:00

Yegorovskaya (Russian: Егоровская) is a rural locality (a village) in Alarsky District, Irkutsk Oblast, Russia. Population: 353 (2010 census);

== Geography ==
This rural locality is located 15 kilometres (9.3 mi) from Kutulik (the district's administrative centre), 141 kilometres (88 mi) from Irkutsk (capital of Irkutsk Oblast) and 4,354 kilometres (2,705 mi) from Moscow. Kerbulak is the nearest rural locality.
