= Maly Kutulik =

Maly Kutulik Малый Кутулик
- Village
- Location within Irkutsk Oblast Location within Russia
- Coordinates: 53°23′N 102°46′E
- Country: Russia
- Region: Irkutsk Oblast
- District: Alarsky District
- Time zone: UTC+8:00

Maly Kutulik (Russian: Малый Кутулик) is a rural locality (a village) in Alarsky District, Irkutsk Oblast, Russia. Population: 122 (2010 census);

== Geography ==
This rural locality is located 6 kilometres (3.7 mi) from Kutulik (the district's administrative centre), 158 kilometres (98 mi) from Irkutsk (capital of Irkutsk Oblast) and 4,328 kilometres (2,689 mi) from Moscow. Shulgina is the nearest rural locality.
