= Apkhulta =

Apkhulta Апхульта
- Village
- Location within Irkutsk Oblast Location within Russia
- Coordinates: 53°20′N 103°05′E
- Country: Russia
- Region: Irkutsk Oblast
- District: Alarsky District
- Time zone: UTC+8:00

Apkhulta (Russian: Апхульта) is a rural locality (a selo) in Alarsky District, Irkutsk Oblast, Russia. Population: 511 (2010 census);

== Geography ==
This rural locality is located 19 kilometres (12 mi) from Kutulik (the district's administrative centre), 142 kilometres (88 mi) from Irkutsk (capital of Irkutsk Oblast) and 4,355 kilometres (2,706 mi) from Moscow. Nelkhay is the nearest rural locality.
