= Tabarsuk =

Tabarsuk Табарсук
- Village
- Location within Irkutsk Oblast Location within Russia
- Coordinates: 53°25′N 102°54′E
- Country: Russia
- Region: Irkutsk Oblast
- District: Alarsky District
- Time zone: UTC+8:00

Tabarsuk (Russian: Табарсук) is a rural locality (a selo) in Alarsky District, Irkutsk Oblast, Russia. Population: 557 (2010 census);

== Geography ==
This rural locality is located 12 kilometres (7.5 mi) from Kutulik (the district's administrative centre), 156 kilometres (97 mi) from Irkutsk (capital of Irkutsk Oblast) and 4,333 kilometres (2,692 mi) from Moscow. Duta is the nearest rural locality.
