= Khalta =

Khalta Халта
- Village
- Location within Irkutsk Oblast Location within Russia
- Coordinates: 53°03′N 102°42′E
- Country: Russia
- Region: Irkutsk Oblast
- District: Alarsky District
- Time zone: UTC+8:00

Khalta (Russian: Халта) is a rural locality (a village) in Alarsky District, Irkutsk Oblast, Russia. Population: 17 (2010 census);

== Geography ==
This rural locality is located 33 kilometres (21 mi) from Kutulik (the district's administrative centre), 135 kilometres (84 mi) from Irkutsk (capital of Irkutsk Oblast) and 4,361 kilometres (2,710 mi) from Moscow. Nygda is the nearest rural locality.
