= Nelkhay =

Nelkhay Нельхай
- Village
- Location within Irkutsk Oblast Location within Russia
- Coordinates: 53°21′N 103°07′E
- Country: Russia
- Region: Irkutsk Oblast
- District: Alarsky District
- Time zone: UTC+8:00

Nelkhay (Russian: Нельхай) is a rural locality (a village) in Alarsky District, Irkutsk Oblast, Russia. Population: 300 (2010 census);

== Geography ==
This rural locality is located 22 kilometres (14 mi) from Kutulik (the district's administrative centre), 141 kilometres (88 mi) from Irkutsk (capital of Irkutsk Oblast) and 4,356 kilometres (2,707 mi) from Moscow. Apkhulta is the nearest rural locality.
