= Shastina, Irkutsk Oblast =

Shastina Шастина
- Village
- Location within Irkutsk Oblast Location within Russia
- Coordinates: 53°21′N 102°29′E
- Country: Russia
- Region: Irkutsk Oblast
- District: Alarsky District
- Time zone: UTC+8:00

Shastina (Russian: Шастина) is a rural locality (a village) in Alarsky District, Irkutsk Oblast, Russia. Population: 30 (2010 census);

== Geography ==
This rural locality is located 21 kilometres (13 mi) from Kutulik (the district's administrative centre), 168 kilometres (104 mi) from Irkutsk (capital of Irkutsk Oblast) and 4,313 kilometres (2,680 mi) from Moscow. Buryatskaya is the nearest rural locality.
