= Khalty =

Khalty Халты
- Village
- Location within Irkutsk Oblast Location within Russia
- Coordinates: 53°15′N 102°15′E
- Country: Russia
- Region: Irkutsk Oblast
- District: Alarsky District
- Time zone: UTC+8:00

Khalty (Russian: Халты) is a rural locality (a village) in Alarsky District, Irkutsk Oblast, Russia. Population: 32 (2010 census);

== Geography ==
This rural locality is located 37 kilometres (23 mi) from Kutulik (the district's administrative centre), 173 kilometres (107 mi) from Irkutsk (capital of Irkutsk Oblast) and 4,308 kilometres (2,677 mi) from Moscow. Klyuchi is the nearest rural locality.
