= Manilovskaya =

Manilovskaya Маниловская
- Village
- Location within Irkutsk Oblast Location within Russia
- Coordinates: 53°29′N 102°44′E
- Country: Russia
- Region: Irkutsk Oblast
- District: Alarsky District
- Time zone: UTC+8:00

Manilovskaya (Russian: Маниловская) is a rural locality (a village) in Alarsky District, Irkutsk Oblast, Russia. Population: 400 (2010 census);

== Geography ==
This rural locality is located 17 kilometres (11 mi) from Kutulik (the district's administrative centre), 169 kilometres (105 mi) from Irkutsk (capital of Irkutsk Oblast) and 4,314 kilometres (2,681 mi) from Moscow. Vladimir is the nearest rural locality.
