= Maloluchinsk =

Maloluchinsk Малолучинск
- Village
- Location within Irkutsk Oblast Location within Russia
- Coordinates: 53°12′N 102°35′E
- Country: Russia
- Region: Irkutsk Oblast
- District: Alarsky District
- Time zone: UTC+8:00

Maloluchinsk (Russian: Малолучинск) is a rural locality (a village) in Alarsky District, Irkutsk Oblast, Russia. Population: 131 (2010 census);

== Geography ==
This rural locality is located 20 kilometres (12 mi) from Kutulik (the district's administrative centre), 152 kilometres (94 mi) from Irkutsk (capital of Irkutsk Oblast) and 4,336 kilometres (2,694 mi) from Moscow. Gotol is the nearest rural locality.
