= Tyutrina =

Tyutrina Тютрина
- Village
- Location within Irkutsk Oblast Location within Russia
- Coordinates: 53°21′N 102°51′E
- Country: Russia
- Region: Irkutsk Oblast
- District: Alarsky District
- Time zone: UTC+8:00

Tyutrina (Russian: Тютрина) is a rural locality (a village) in Alarsky District, Irkutsk Oblast, Russia. Population: 109 (2010 census);

== Geography ==
This rural locality is located 4 kilometres (2.5 mi) from Kutulik (the district's administrative centre), 151 kilometres (94 mi) from Irkutsk (capital of Irkutsk Oblast) and 4,338 kilometres (2,696 mi) from Moscow. Mogoy is the nearest rural locality.
