= Zabituy =

Zabituy Забитуй
- Village
- Location within Irkutsk Oblast Location within Russia
- Coordinates: 53°16′N 102°49′E
- Country: Russia
- Region: Irkutsk Oblast
- District: Alarsky District
- Time zone: UTC+8:00

Zabituy (Russian: Забитуй) is a rural locality (a settlement) in Alarsky District, Irkutsk Oblast, Russia. Population: 1,481 (2010 census);

== Geography ==
This rural locality is located 8 kilometres (5.0 mi) from Kutulik (the district's administrative centre), 146 kilometres (91 mi) from Irkutsk (capital of Irkutsk Oblast) and 4,345 kilometres (2,700 mi) from Moscow. Omulevka is the nearest rural locality.
