= Bakhay 1-y =

Bakhay 1-y Бахай 1-й
- Village
- Location within Irkutsk Oblast Location within Russia
- Coordinates: 52°55′N 105°22′E
- Country: Russia
- Region: Irkutsk Oblast
- District: Bayandayevsky District
- Time zone: UTC+8:00

Bakhay 1-y (Russian: Бахай 1-й) is a rural locality (a village) in Bayandayevsky District, Irkutsk Oblast, Russia. Population: 147 (2010 census);

== Geography ==
This rural locality is located 17 kilometres (11 mi) from Bayanday (the district's administrative centre), 102 kilometres (63 mi) from Irkutsk (capital of Irkutsk Oblast) and 4,553 kilometres (2,829 mi) from Moscow. Zagatuy is the nearest rural locality.
