= Podvyezdny =

Podvyezdny Подвыездный
- Village
- Location within Irkutsk Oblast Location within Russia
- Coordinates: 56°17′N 102°03′E
- Country: Russia
- Region: Irkutsk Oblast
- District: Bratsky District
- Time zone: UTC+8:00

Podvyezdny (Russian: Подвыездный) is a rural locality (a settlement) in Bratsky District, Irkutsk Oblast, Russia. Population: 10 (2010 census); 17 (2002 census);

== Geography ==
This rural locality is located 30 kilometres (19 mi) from Bratsk (the district's administrative centre), 466 kilometres (290 mi) from Irkutsk (capital of Irkutsk Oblast) and 3,977 kilometres (2,471 mi) from Moscow. Sukhoy is the nearest rural locality.
