= Kharagun, Bayandayevsky District =

Kharagun Харагун
- Village
- Location within Irkutsk Oblast Location within Russia
- Coordinates: 53°07′N 105°48′E
- Country: Russia
- Region: Irkutsk Oblast
- District: Bayandayevsky District
- Time zone: UTC+8:00

Kharagun (Russian: Харагун) is a rural locality (a village) in Bayandayevsky District, Irkutsk Oblast, Russia. Population: 108 (2010 census);

== Geography ==
This rural locality is located 22 kilometres (14 mi) from Balagansk (the district's administrative centre), 138 kilometres (86 mi) from Irkutsk (capital of Irkutsk Oblast) and 4,560 kilometres (2,830 mi) from Moscow. Lidinskaya is the nearest rural locality.
