= Ust-Tarasa =

Ust-Tarasa Усть-Тараса
- Village
- Location within Irkutsk Oblast Location within Russia
- Coordinates: 53°10′N 103°42′E
- Country: Russia
- Region: Irkutsk Oblast
- District: Bokhansky District
- Time zone: UTC+8:00

Ust-Tarasa (Russian: Усть-Тараса) is a rural locality (a village) in Bokhansky District, Irkutsk Oblast, Russia. Population: 736 (2010 census);

== Geography ==
This rural locality is located 5 kilometres (3.1 mi) from Bokhan (the district's administrative centre), 106 kilometres (66 mi) from Irkutsk (capital of Irkutsk Oblast) and 4,414 kilometres (2,743 mi) from Moscow. Novaya Ida is the nearest rural locality.
