= Lavrentyevsk =

Lavrentyevsk Лаврентьевская
- Village
- Location within Irkutsk Oblast Location within Russia
- Coordinates: 53°10′N 104°07′E
- Country: Russia
- Region: Irkutsk Oblast
- District: Bokhansky District
- Time zone: UTC+8:00

Lavrentyevsk (Russian: Лаврентьевская) is a rural locality (a village) in Bokhansky District, Irkutsk Oblast, Russia. Population: 70 (2010 census);

== Geography ==
This rural locality is located 24 kilometres (15 mi) from Bokhan (the district's administrative centre), 99 kilometres (62 mi) from Irkutsk (capital of Irkutsk Oblast) and 4,443 kilometres (2,761 mi) from Moscow. Ukyr is the nearest rural locality.
