= Zverevo, Irkutsk Oblast =

Zverevo Зверево
- Village
- Location within Irkutsk Oblast Location within Russia
- Coordinates: 52°23′N 103°56′E
- Country: Russia
- Region: Irkutsk Oblast
- District: Angarsky District
- Time zone: UTC+8:00

Zverevo (Russian: Зверево) is a rural locality (a settlement) in Angarsky District, Irkutsk Oblast, Russia. Population: 13 (2010 census);

== Geography ==
This rural locality is located 18 kilometres (11 mi) from Angarsk (the district's administrative centre), 26 kilometres (16 mi) from Irkutsk (capital of Irkutsk Oblast) and 4,516 kilometres (2,806 mi) from Moscow. Klyuchevaya is the nearest rural locality.
