= Tyrgetuy =

Tyrgetuy Тыргетуй
- Village
- Location within Irkutsk Oblast Location within Russia
- Coordinates: 53°21′N 103°16′E
- Country: Russia
- Region: Irkutsk Oblast
- District: Alarsky District
- Time zone: UTC+8:00

Tyrgetuy (Russian: Тыргетуй) is a rural locality (a selo) in Alarsky District, Irkutsk Oblast, Russia. Population: 468 (2010 census);

== Geography ==
This rural locality is located 32 kilometres (20 mi) from Kutulik (the district's administrative centre), 136 kilometres (85 mi) from Irkutsk (capital of Irkutsk Oblast) and 4,366 kilometres (2,713 mi) from Moscow. Baltuy is the nearest rural locality.
