= Klyuchi, Alarsky District =

Klyuchi Ключи
- Village
- Location within Irkutsk Oblast Location within Russia
- Coordinates: 53°13′N 102°18′E
- Country: Russia
- Region: Irkutsk Oblast
- District: Alarsky District
- Time zone: UTC+8:00

Klyuchi (Russian: Ключи) is a rural locality (a village) in Alarsky District, Irkutsk Oblast, Russia. Population: 80 (2010 census);

== Geography ==
This rural locality is located 35 kilometres (22 mi) from Kutulik (the district's administrative centre), 168 kilometres (104 mi) from Irkutsk (capital of Irkutsk Oblast) and 4,314 kilometres (2,681 mi) from Moscow. Otradnaya is the nearest rural locality.
