= Zuy =

Zuy Зуй
- Village
- Location within Irkutsk Oblast Location within Russia
- Coordinates: 52°27′N 104°02′E
- Country: Russia
- Region: Irkutsk Oblast
- District: Angarsky District
- Time zone: UTC+8:00

Zuy (Russian: Зуй) is a rural locality (a village) in Angarsky District, Irkutsk Oblast, Russia. Population: 309 (2010 census);

== Geography ==
This rural locality is located 15 kilometres (9.3 mi) from Angarsk (the district's administrative centre), 24 kilometres (15 mi) from Irkutsk (capital of Irkutsk Oblast) and 4,516 kilometres (2,806 mi) from Moscow. Karyer is the nearest rural locality.
