= Bulak, Bratsky District =

Bulak Булак
- Village
- Location within Irkutsk Oblast Location within Russia
- Coordinates: 55°06′N 100°53′E
- Country: Russia
- Region: Irkutsk Oblast
- District: Bratsky District
- Time zone: UTC+8:00

Bulak (Russian: Булак) is a rural locality (a village) in Bratsky District, Irkutsk Oblast, Russia. Population: 9 (2010 census);

== Geography ==
This rural locality is located 126 kilometres (78 mi) from Bratsk (the district's administrative centre), 380 kilometres (240 mi) from Irkutsk (capital of Irkutsk Oblast) and 4,025 kilometres (2,501 mi) from Moscow. Novoye Prirechye is the nearest rural locality.
