= Zhlobina =

Zhlobina Жлобина
- Village
- Location within Irkutsk Oblast Location within Russia
- Coordinates: 53°30′N 103°05′E
- Country: Russia
- Region: Irkutsk Oblast
- District: Alarsky District
- Time zone: UTC+8:00

Zhlobina (Russian: Жлобина) is a rural locality (a village) in Alarsky District, Irkutsk Oblast, Russia. Population: 172 (2010 census);

== Geography ==
This rural locality is located 26 kilometres (16 mi) from Kutulik (the district's administrative centre), 156 kilometres (97 mi) from Irkutsk (capital of Irkutsk Oblast) and 4,338 kilometres (2,696 mi) from Moscow. Bakhtay is the nearest rural locality.
