= Ust-Ukyr =

Ust-Ukyr Усть-Укыр
- Village
- Location within Irkutsk Oblast Location within Russia
- Coordinates: 53°07′N 104°06′E
- Country: Russia
- Region: Irkutsk Oblast
- District: Bokhansky District
- Time zone: UTC+8:00

Ust-Ukyr (Russian: Усть-Укыр) is a rural locality (a village) in Bokhansky District, Irkutsk Oblast, Russia. Population: 59 (2010 census);

== Geography ==
This rural locality is located 22 kilometres (14 mi) from Bokhan (the district's administrative centre), 95 kilometres (59 mi) from Irkutsk (capital of Irkutsk Oblast) and 4,445 kilometres (2,762 mi) from Moscow. Ukyr is the nearest rural locality.
