= Turgenevka =

Turgenevka Тургеневка
- Village
- Location within Irkutsk Oblast Location within Russia
- Coordinates: 53°01′N 105°40′E
- Country: Russia
- Region: Irkutsk Oblast
- District: Bayandayevsky District
- Time zone: UTC+8:00

Turgenevka (Russian: Тургеневка) is a rural locality (a selo) in Bayandayevsky District, Irkutsk Oblast, Russia. Population: 505 (2010 census);

== Geography ==
This rural locality is located 11 kilometres (6.8 mi) from Bayanday (the district's administrative centre), 124 kilometres (77 mi) from Irkutsk (capital of Irkutsk Oblast) and 4,561 kilometres (2,834 mi) from Moscow. Tolstovka is the nearest rural locality.
