= Burkova, Irkutsk Oblast =

Burkova Буркова
- Village
- Location within Irkutsk Oblast Location within Russia
- Coordinates: 53°01′N 102°36′E
- Country: Russia
- Region: Irkutsk Oblast
- District: Alarsky District
- Time zone: UTC+8:00

Burkova (Russian: Буркова) is a rural locality (a village) in Alarsky District, Irkutsk Oblast, Russia. Population: 138 (2010 census);

== Geography ==
This rural locality is located 38 kilometres (24 mi) from Kutulik (the district's administrative centre), 139 kilometres (86 mi) from Irkutsk (capital of Irkutsk Oblast) and 4,357 kilometres (2,707 mi) from Moscow. Nygda is the nearest rural locality.
