= Meget =

Meget Мегет
- Village
- Location within Irkutsk Oblast Location within Russia
- Coordinates: 52°25′N 104°03′E
- Country: Russia
- Region: Irkutsk Oblast
- District: Angarsky District
- Time zone: UTC+8:00

Meget (Russian: Мегет) is a rural locality (a settlement) in Angarsky District, Irkutsk Oblast, Russia. Population:8,605 (2021 census);

== Geography ==
This rural locality is located 18 kilometres (11 mi) from Angarsk (the district's administrative centre), 21 kilometres (13 mi) from Irkutsk (capital of Irkutsk Oblast) and 4,521 kilometres (2,809 mi) from Moscow. Udarnik is the nearest rural locality.
