= Khandagay, Bayandayevsky District =

Khandagay Хандагай
- Village
- Location within Irkutsk Oblast Location within Russia
- Coordinates: 53°09′N 105°51′E
- Country: Russia
- Region: Irkutsk Oblast
- District: Bayandayevsky District
- Time zone: UTC+8:00

Khandagay (Russian: Хандагай) is a rural locality (a village) in Bayandayevsky District, Irkutsk Oblast, Russia. Population: 146 (2010 census);

== Geography ==
This rural locality is located 26 kilometres (16 mi) from Balagansk (the district's administrative centre), 143 kilometres (89 mi) from Irkutsk (capital of Irkutsk Oblast) and 4,558 kilometres (2,832 mi) from Moscow. Kharagun is the nearest rural locality.
