= Kurkat, Irkutsk Oblast =

Kurkat Куркат
- Village
- Location within Irkutsk Oblast Location within Russia
- Coordinates: 53°10′N 102°25′E
- Country: Russia
- Region: Irkutsk Oblast
- District: Alarsky District
- Time zone: UTC+8:00

Kurkat (Russian: Куркат) is a rural locality (a village) in Alarsky District, Irkutsk Oblast, Russia. Population: 140 (2010 census);

== Geography ==
This rural locality is located 31 kilometres (19 mi) from Kutulik (the district's administrative centre), 158 kilometres (98 mi) from Irkutsk (capital of Irkutsk Oblast) and 4,329 kilometres (2,690 mi) from Moscow. Kukunur is the nearest rural locality.
