= Shapshaltuy =

Shapshaltuy Шапшалтуй
- Village
- Location within Irkutsk Oblast Location within Russia
- Coordinates: 53°17′N 102°39′E
- Country: Russia
- Region: Irkutsk Oblast
- District: Alarsky District
- Time zone: UTC+8:00

Shapshaltuy (Russian: Шапшалтуй) is a rural locality (a village) in Alarsky District, Irkutsk Oblast, Russia. Population: 61 (2010 census);

== Geography ==
This rural locality is located 11 kilometres (6.8 mi) from Kutulik (the district's administrative centre), 155 kilometres (96 mi) from Irkutsk (capital of Irkutsk Oblast) and 4,331 kilometres (2,691 mi) from Moscow. Ugolnaya is the nearest rural locality.
