= Mutinova =

Mutinova Мутинова
- Village
- Location within Irkutsk Oblast Location within Russia
- Coordinates: 53°22′N 103°29′E
- Country: Russia
- Region: Irkutsk Oblast
- District: Bokhansky District
- Time zone: UTC+8:00

Mutinova (Russian: Мутинова) is a rural locality (a village) in Bokhansky District, Irkutsk Oblast, Russia. Population: 144 (2010 census);

== Geography ==
This rural locality is located 32 kilometres (20 mi) from Bokhan (the district's administrative centre), 132 kilometres (82 mi) from Irkutsk (capital of Irkutsk Oblast) and 4,377 kilometres (2,720 mi) from Moscow. Donskaya is the nearest rural locality.
