= Grekhnevka, Irkutsk Oblast =

Grekhnevka Грехневка
- Village
- Location within Irkutsk Oblast Location within Russia
- Coordinates: 52°54′N 103°46′E
- Country: Russia
- Region: Irkutsk Oblast
- District: Bokhansky District
- Time zone: UTC+8:00

Grekhnevka (Russian: Грехневка) is a rural locality (a village) in Bokhansky District, Irkutsk Oblast, Russia. Population: 164 (2010 census);

== Geography ==
This rural locality is located 28 kilometres (17 mi) from Bokhan (the district's administrative centre), 76 kilometres (47 mi) from Irkutsk (capital of Irkutsk Oblast) and 4,448 kilometres (2,764 mi) from Moscow. Olonki is the nearest rural locality.
