= Nygda =

Nygda Ныгда
- Village
- Location within Irkutsk Oblast Location within Russia
- Coordinates: 53°01′N 102°40′E
- Country: Russia
- Region: Irkutsk Oblast
- District: Alarsky District
- Time zone: UTC+8:00

Nygda (Russian: Ныгда) is a rural locality (a village) in Alarsky District, Irkutsk Oblast, Russia. Population: 664 (2010 census);

== Geography ==
This rural locality is located 37 kilometres (23 mi) from Kutulik (the district's administrative centre), 134 kilometres (83 mi) from Irkutsk (capital of Irkutsk Oblast) and 4,363 kilometres (2,711 mi) from Moscow. Khalta is the nearest rural locality.
