= Vesyolaya Polyana, Irkutsk Oblast =

Vesyolaya Polyana Весёлая Поляна
- Village
- Location within Irkutsk Oblast Location within Russia
- Coordinates: 53°08′N 104°26′E
- Country: Russia
- Region: Irkutsk Oblast
- District: Bokhansky District
- Time zone: UTC+8:00

Vesyolaya Polyana (Russian: Весёлая Поляна) is a rural locality (a settlement) in Bokhansky District, Irkutsk Oblast, Russia. Population: 16 (2010 census);

== Geography ==
This rural locality is located 44 kilometres (27 mi) from Bokhan (the district's administrative centre), 95 kilometres (59 mi) from Irkutsk (capital of Irkutsk Oblast) and 4,467 kilometres (2,776 mi) from Moscow. Bazoy is the nearest rural locality.
