= Morozova, Irkutsk Oblast =

Morozova Морозова
- Village
- Location within Irkutsk Oblast Location within Russia
- Coordinates: 53°11′N 103°31′E
- Country: Russia
- Region: Irkutsk Oblast
- District: Bokhansky District
- Time zone: UTC+8:00

Morozova (Russian: Морозова) is a rural locality (a village) in Bokhansky District, Irkutsk Oblast, Russia. Population: 274 (2010 census);

== Geography ==
This rural locality is located 18 kilometres (11 mi) from Bokhan (the district's administrative centre), 113 kilometres (70 mi) from Irkutsk (capital of Irkutsk Oblast) and 4,399 kilometres (2,733 mi) from Moscow. Vanteyevskaya is the nearest rural locality.
