= Vysotskaya, Irkutsk Oblast =

Vysotskaya Высотская
- Village
- Location within Irkutsk Oblast Location within Russia
- Coordinates: 53°16′N 102°11′E
- Country: Russia
- Region: Irkutsk Oblast
- District: Alarsky District
- Time zone: UTC+8:00

Vysotskaya (Russian: Высотская) is a rural locality (a village) in Alarsky District, Irkutsk Oblast, Russia. Population: 91 (2010 census);

== Geography ==
This rural locality is located 41 kilometres (25 mi) from Kutulik (the district's administrative centre), 177 kilometres (110 mi) from Irkutsk (capital of Irkutsk Oblast) and 4,302 kilometres (2,673 mi) from Moscow. Marday is the nearest rural locality.
