= Zyaba =

Zyaba Зяба
- Village
- Location within Irkutsk Oblast Location within Russia
- Coordinates: 56°22′N 102°07′E
- Country: Russia
- Region: Irkutsk Oblast
- District: Bratsky District
- Time zone: UTC+8:00

Zyaba (Russian: Зяба) is a rural locality (a settlement) in Bratsky District, Irkutsk Oblast, Russia. Population: 497 (2010 census);

== Geography ==
This rural locality is located 40 kilometres (25 mi) from Bratsk (the district's administrative centre), 474 kilometres (295 mi) from Irkutsk (capital of Irkutsk Oblast) and 3,973 kilometres (2,469 mi) from Moscow. Pashenny is the nearest rural locality.
