= Yakimovka =

Yakimovka Якимовка
- Village
- Location within Irkutsk Oblast Location within Russia
- Coordinates: 52°23′N 103°30′E
- Country: Russia
- Region: Irkutsk Oblast
- District: Angarsky District
- Time zone: UTC+8:00

Yakimovka (Russian: Якимовка) is a rural locality (a settlement) in Angarsky District, Irkutsk Oblast, Russia. Population: 47 (2010 census);

== Geography ==
This rural locality is located 31 kilometres (19 mi) from Angarsk (the district's administrative centre), 54 kilometres (34 mi) from Irkutsk (capital of Irkutsk Oblast) and 4,486 kilometres (2,787 mi) from Moscow. Chebogory is the nearest rural locality.
