= Pashenny =

Pashenny Пашенный
- Village
- Location within Irkutsk Oblast Location within Russia
- Coordinates: 56°26′N 102°15′E
- Country: Russia
- Region: Irkutsk Oblast
- District: Bratsky District
- Time zone: UTC+8:00

Pashenny (Russian: Пашенный) is a rural locality (a settlement) in Bratsky District, Irkutsk Oblast, Russia. Population: 19 (2010 census);

== Geography ==
This rural locality is located 50 kilometres (31 mi) from Bratsk (the district's administrative centre), 478 kilometres (297 mi) from Irkutsk (capital of Irkutsk Oblast) and 3,974 kilometres (2,469 mi) from Moscow. Borovskoy is the nearest rural locality.
