= Ozyorny, Bratsky District =

Ozyorny Озёрный
- Village
- Location within Irkutsk Oblast Location within Russia
- Coordinates: 55°52′N 102°05′E
- Country: Russia
- Region: Irkutsk Oblast
- District: Bratsky District
- Time zone: UTC+8:00

Ozyorny (Russian: Озёрный) is a rural locality (a settlement) in Bratsky District, Irkutsk Oblast, Russia. Population: 200 (2010 census);

== Geography ==
This rural locality is located 42 kilometres (26 mi) from Bratsk (the district's administrative centre), 422 kilometres (262 mi) from Irkutsk (capital of Irkutsk Oblast) and 4,021 kilometres (2,499 mi) from Moscow. Pervomaysky is the nearest rural locality.
