= Naumovka, Irkutsk Oblast =

Naumovka Наумовка
- Village
- Location within Irkutsk Oblast Location within Russia
- Coordinates: 52°50′N 105°09′E
- Country: Russia
- Region: Irkutsk Oblast
- District: Bayandayevsky District
- Time zone: UTC+8:00

Naumovka (Russian: Наумовка) is a rural locality (a village) in Bayandayevsky District, Irkutsk Oblast, Russia. Population: 183 (2010 census);

== Geography ==
This rural locality is located 33 kilometres (21 mi) from Bayanday (the district's administrative centre), 86 kilometres (53 mi) from Irkutsk (capital of Irkutsk Oblast) and 4,548 kilometres (2,826 mi) from Moscow. Khatar-Khaday is the nearest rural locality.
