= Dobchur =

Dobchur Добчур
- Village
- Location within Irkutsk Oblast Location within Russia
- Coordinates: 55°20′N 101°08′E
- Country: Russia
- Region: Irkutsk Oblast
- District: Bratsky District
- Time zone: UTC+8:00

Dobchur (Russian: Добчур) is a rural locality (a village) in Bratsky District, Irkutsk Oblast, Russia. Population: 1,069 (2010 census);

== Geography ==
This rural locality is located 95 kilometres (59 mi) from Bratsk (the district's administrative centre), 393 kilometres (244 mi) from Irkutsk (capital of Irkutsk Oblast) and 4,018 kilometres (2,497 mi) from Moscow. Bada is the nearest rural locality.
