= Marday =

Marday Мардай
- Village
- Location within Irkutsk Oblast Location within Russia
- Coordinates: 53°18′N 102°11′E
- Country: Russia
- Region: Irkutsk Oblast
- District: Alarsky District
- Time zone: UTC+8:00

Marday (Russian: Мардай) is a rural locality (a village) in Alarsky District, Irkutsk Oblast, Russia. Population: 21 (2010 census);

== Geography ==
This rural locality is located 41 kilometres (25 mi) from Kutulik (the district's administrative centre), 179 kilometres (111 mi) from Irkutsk (capital of Irkutsk Oblast) and 4,299 kilometres (2,671 mi) from Moscow. Myagchinsky is the nearest rural locality.
