= Oktyabrsk, Irkutsk Oblast =

Oktyabrsk Октябрьск
- Village
- Location within Irkutsk Oblast Location within Russia
- Coordinates: 55°15′N 102°14′E
- Country: Russia
- Region: Irkutsk Oblast
- District: Bratsky District
- Time zone: UTC+8:00

Oktyabrsk (Russian: Октябрьск) is a rural locality (a settlement) in Bratsky District, Irkutsk Oblast, Russia. Population: 164 (2010 census); 407 (2002 census);

== Geography ==
This rural locality is located 106 kilometres (66 mi) from Bratsk (the district's administrative centre), 355 kilometres (221 mi) from Irkutsk (capital of Irkutsk Oblast) and 4,096 kilometres (2,545 mi) from Moscow. Tynkob is the nearest rural locality.
