= Chernigovskaya, Irkutsk Oblast =

Chernigovskaya Черниговская
- Village
- Location within Irkutsk Oblast Location within Russia
- Coordinates: 53°16′N 103°28′E
- Country: Russia
- Region: Irkutsk Oblast
- District: Bokhansky District
- Time zone: UTC+8:00

Chernigovskaya (Russian: Черниговская) is a rural locality (a village) in Bokhansky District, Irkutsk Oblast, Russia. Population: 62 (2010 census);

== Geography ==
This rural locality is located 25 kilometres (16 mi) from Bokhan (the district's administrative centre), 123 kilometres (76 mi) from Irkutsk (capital of Irkutsk Oblast) and 4,387 kilometres (2,726 mi) from Moscow. Kryukova is the nearest rural locality.
