= Dubynino, Irkutsk Oblast =

Dubynino Дубынино
- Village
- Location within Irkutsk Oblast Location within Russia
- Coordinates: 56°36′N 101°47′E
- Country: Russia
- Region: Irkutsk Oblast
- District: Bratsky District
- Time zone: UTC+8:00

Dubynino (Russian: Дубынино) is a rural locality (a selo) in Bratsky District, Irkutsk Oblast, Russia. Population: 258 (2010 census);

== Geography ==
This rural locality is located 52 kilometres (32 mi) from Bratsk (the district's administrative centre), 504 kilometres (313 mi) from Irkutsk (capital of Irkutsk Oblast) and 3,928 kilometres (2,441 mi) from Moscow. Koblyakovo is the nearest rural locality.
