= Kuyta =

Kuyta Куйта
- Village
- Location within Irkutsk Oblast Location within Russia
- Coordinates: 53°10′N 102°44′E
- Country: Russia
- Region: Irkutsk Oblast
- District: Alarsky District
- Time zone: UTC+8:00

Kuyta (Russian: Куйта) is a rural locality (a village) in Alarsky District, Irkutsk Oblast, Russia. Population: 200 (2010 census);

== Geography ==
This rural locality is located 18 kilometres (11 mi) from Kutulik (the district's administrative centre), 143 kilometres (89 mi) from Irkutsk (capital of Irkutsk Oblast) and 4,349 kilometres (2,702 mi) from Moscow. Ideal is the nearest rural locality.
