= Tolstovka, Irkutsk Oblast =

Tolstovka Толстовка
- Village
- Location within Irkutsk Oblast Location within Russia
- Coordinates: 53°03′N 105°43′E
- Country: Russia
- Region: Irkutsk Oblast
- District: Bayandayevsky District
- Time zone: UTC+8:00

Tolstovka (Russian: Толстовка) is a rural locality (a village) in Bayandayevsky District, Irkutsk Oblast, Russia. Population: 57 (2010 census);

== Geography ==
This rural locality is located 14 kilometres (8.7 mi) from Bayanday (the district's administrative centre), 129 kilometres (80 mi) from Irkutsk (capital of Irkutsk Oblast) and 4,561 kilometres (2,834 mi) from Moscow. Vasilyevka is the nearest rural locality.
