= Priboyny =

Priboyny Прибойный
- Village
- Location within Irkutsk Oblast Location within Russia
- Coordinates: 55°38′N 103°13′E
- Country: Russia
- Region: Irkutsk Oblast
- District: Bratsky District
- Time zone: UTC+8:00

Priboyny (Russian: Прибойный) is a rural locality (a settlement) in Bratsky District, Irkutsk Oblast, Russia. Population: 200 (2010 census);

== Geography ==
This rural locality is located 116 kilometres (72 mi) from Bratsk (the district's administrative centre), 378 kilometres (235 mi) from Irkutsk (capital of Irkutsk Oblast) and 4,118 kilometres (2,559 mi) from Moscow. Karakhun is the nearest rural locality.
