= Zagatuy =

Zagatuy Загатуй
- Village
- Location within Irkutsk Oblast Location within Russia
- Coordinates: 52°53′N 105°20′E
- Country: Russia
- Region: Irkutsk Oblast
- District: Bayandayevsky District
- Time zone: UTC+8:00

Zagatuy (Russian: Загатуй) is a rural locality (a village) in Bayandayevsky District, Irkutsk Oblast, Russia. Population: 671 (2010 census);

== Geography ==
This rural locality is located 22 kilometres (14 mi) from Bayanday (the district's administrative centre), 97 kilometres (60 mi) from Irkutsk (capital of Irkutsk Oblast) and 4,555 kilometres (2,830 mi) from Moscow. Khiney is the nearest rural locality.
