= Tymyrey =

Tymyrey Тымырей
- Village
- Location within Irkutsk Oblast Location within Russia
- Coordinates: 53°17′N 103°36′E
- Country: Russia
- Region: Irkutsk Oblast
- District: Bokhansky District
- Time zone: UTC+8:00

Tymyrey (Russian: Тымырей) is a rural locality (a village) in Bokhansky District, Irkutsk Oblast, Russia. Population: 57 (2010 census);

== Geography ==
This rural locality is located 19 kilometres (12 mi) from Bokhan (the district's administrative centre), 120 kilometres (75 mi) from Irkutsk (capital of Irkutsk Oblast) and 4,395 kilometres (2,731 mi) from Moscow. Loganova is the nearest rural locality.
