= Zangut =

Zangut Зангут
- Village
- Location within Irkutsk Oblast Location within Russia
- Coordinates: 53°07′N 105°39′E
- Country: Russia
- Region: Irkutsk Oblast
- District: Bayandayevsky District
- Time zone: UTC+8:00

Zangut (Russian: Зангут) is a rural locality (a village) in Bayandayevsky District, Irkutsk Oblast, Russia. Population: 12 (2010 census);

== Geography ==
This rural locality is located 13 kilometres (8.1 mi) from Bayanday (the district's administrative centre), 132 kilometres (82 mi) from Irkutsk (capital of Irkutsk Oblast) and 4,550 kilometres (2,830 mi) from Moscow. Polovinka is the nearest rural locality.
