= Kumareyka =

Village in Irkutsk Oblast, Russia

Coordinates: 54.4711°N 102.9869°E

Kumareyka (Russian: Кумарейка) is a village (selo) in Balagansky District of Irkutsk Oblast, Russia.
