= Kazachye, Irkutsk Oblast =

Kazachye Казачье
- Village
- Location within Irkutsk Oblast Location within Russia
- Coordinates: 52°00′N 103°00′E
- Country: Russia
- Region: Irkutsk Oblast
- District: Bokhansky District
- Time zone: UTC+8:00

Kazachye (Russian: Казачье) is a rural locality (a selo) in Bokhansky District, Irkutsk Oblast, Russia. Population: 1,122 (2010 census);

== Geography ==
This rural locality is located 31 kilometres (19 mi) from Bokhan (the district's administrative centre), 129 kilometres (80 mi) from Irkutsk (capital of Irkutsk Oblast) and 4,378 kilometres (2,720 mi) from Moscow. Chernigovskaya is the nearest rural locality.
