= Seredkino, Irkutsk Oblast =

Seredkino Середкина
- Village
- Location within Irkutsk Oblast Location within Russia
- Coordinates: 53°26′N 103°24′E
- Country: Russia
- Region: Irkutsk Oblast
- District: Bokhansky District
- Time zone: UTC+8:00

Seredkino (Russian: Середкина) is a rural locality (a selo) in Bokhansky District, Irkutsk Oblast, Russia. Population: 834 (2010 census);

== Geography ==
This rural locality is located 40 kilometres (25 mi) from Bokhan (the district's administrative centre), 140 kilometres (87 mi) from Irkutsk (capital of Irkutsk Oblast) and 4,365 kilometres (2,712 mi) from Moscow. Angarsky is the nearest rural locality.
