= Tarasovsk =

Tarasovsk Тарасовск
- Village
- Location within Irkutsk Oblast Location within Russia
- Coordinates: 54°22′N 102°55′E
- Country: Russia
- Region: Irkutsk Oblast
- District: Balagansky District
- Time zone: UTC+8:00

Tarasovsk (Russian: Тарасовск) is a rural locality (a village) in Balagansky District, Irkutsk Oblast, Russia. Population: 125 (2010 census);

== Geography ==
This rural locality is located 41 kilometres (25 mi) from Balagansk (the district's administrative centre), 248 kilometres (154 mi) from Irkutsk (capital of Irkutsk Oblast) and 4,233 kilometres (2,630 mi) from Moscow. Sharagay is the nearest rural locality.
