= Kayzaran =

Kayzaran Кайзаран
- Village
- Location within Irkutsk Oblast Location within Russia
- Coordinates: 53°18′N 106°00′E
- Country: Russia
- Region: Irkutsk Oblast
- District: Bayandayevsky District
- Time zone: UTC+8:00

Kayzaran (Russian: Кайзаран) is a rural locality (a village) in Bayandayevsky District, Irkutsk Oblast, Russia. Population: 167 (2010 census);

== Geography ==
This rural locality is located 43 kilometres (27 mi) from Bayanday (the district's administrative centre), 161 kilometres (100 mi) from Irkutsk (capital of Irkutsk Oblast) and 4,552 kilometres (2,828 mi) from Moscow. Shitkhulun is the nearest rural locality.
