= Klyuchi-Bulak =

Klyuchi-Bulak Ключи-Булак
- Village
- Location within Irkutsk Oblast Location within Russia
- Coordinates: 55°31′N 101°41′E
- Country: Russia
- Region: Irkutsk Oblast
- District: Bratsky District
- Time zone: UTC+8:00

Klyuchi-Bulak (Russian: Ключи-Булак) is a rural locality (a selo) in Bratsky District, Irkutsk Oblast, Russia. Population: 1,387 (2010 census);

== Geography ==
This rural locality is located 70 kilometres (43 mi) from Bratsk (the district's administrative centre), 395 kilometres (245 mi) from Irkutsk (capital of Irkutsk Oblast) and 4,033 kilometres (2,506 mi) from Moscow. Kumeyka is the nearest rural locality.
