= Shipnyagovka =

Shipnyagovka Шипняговка
- Village
- Location within Irkutsk Oblast Location within Russia
- Coordinates: 52°59′N 103°40′E
- Country: Russia
- Region: Irkutsk Oblast
- District: Bokhansky District
- Time zone: UTC+8:00

Shipnyagovka (Russian: Шипняговка) is a rural locality (a village) in Bokhansky District, Irkutsk Oblast, Russia. Population: 83 (2010 census);

== Geography ==
This rural locality is located 20 kilometres (12 mi) from Bokhan (the district's administrative centre), 88 kilometres (55 mi) from Irkutsk (capital of Irkutsk Oblast) and 4,432 kilometres (2,754 mi) from Moscow. Vorobyevka is the nearest rural locality.
