= Kirkey =

Kirkey Киркей
- Village
- Location within Irkutsk Oblast Location within Russia
- Coordinates: 53°14′N 102°24′E
- Country: Russia
- Region: Irkutsk Oblast
- District: Alarsky District
- Time zone: UTC+8:00

Kirkey (Russian: Киркей) is a rural locality (a village) in Alarsky District, Irkutsk Oblast, Russia. Population: 191 (2010 census);

== Geography ==
This rural locality is located 28 kilometres (17 mi) from Kutulik (the district's administrative centre), 164 kilometres (102 mi) from Irkutsk (capital of Irkutsk Oblast) and 4,320 kilometres (2,680 mi) from Moscow. Otradnaya is the nearest rural locality.
