= 1st Otdelenie Gosudarstvennoy Selektsionnoy Stantsii =

1st Otdelenie Gosudarstvennoy Selektsionnoy Stantsii 1-е Отделение Государственной Селекционной Станции
- Settlement
- Location within Irkutsk Oblast Location within Russia
- Coordinates: 54.594444°N 100.467778°E
- Country: Russia
- Region: Irkutsk Oblast
- District: Tulunsky District
- Time zone: UTC+08:00

1st Otdelenie Gosudarstvennoy Selektsionnoy Stantsii (Russian: 1-е Отделение Государственной Селекционной Станции) is a rural locality (a settlement) in Tulunsky District, Russia. The population was 214 as of 2012.

== Geography ==
The settlement is located 10 km northwest of Tulun (the district's administrative centre) by road. Tulun is the nearest rural locality.

== Streets ==
- Zernovaya
- Lesnaya
- Semennaya
