= Ivanova, Irkutsk Oblast =

Ivanova Иванова
- Village
- Location within Irkutsk Oblast Location within Russia
- Coordinates: 53°19′N 102°45′E
- Country: Russia
- Region: Irkutsk Oblast
- District: Alarsky District
- Time zone: UTC+8:00

Ivanova (Russian: Иванова) is a rural locality (a village) in Alarsky District, Irkutsk Oblast, Russia. Population: 141 (2010 census);

== Geography ==
This rural locality is located 4 kilometres (2.5 mi) from Kutulik (the district's administrative centre), 153 kilometres (95 mi) from Irkutsk (capital of Irkutsk Oblast) and 4,335 kilometres (2,694 mi) from Moscow. Kutulik is the nearest rural locality.
