= Kardoy =

Kardoy Кардой
- Village
- Location within Irkutsk Oblast Location within Russia
- Coordinates: 55°12′N 100°34′E
- Country: Russia
- Region: Irkutsk Oblast
- District: Bratsky District
- Time zone: UTC+8:00

Kardoy (Russian: Кардой) is a rural locality (a village) in Bratsky District, Irkutsk Oblast, Russia. Population: 366 (2010 census);

== Geography ==
This rural locality is located 124 kilometres (77 mi) from Bratsk (the district's administrative centre), 401 kilometres (249 mi) from Irkutsk (capital of Irkutsk Oblast) and 3,994 kilometres (2,482 mi) from Moscow. Karay is the nearest rural locality.
