= Kuvatka =

Kuvatka Куватка
- Village
- Location within Irkutsk Oblast Location within Russia
- Coordinates: 55°30′N 101°57′E
- Country: Russia
- Region: Irkutsk Oblast
- District: Bratsky District
- Time zone: UTC+8:00

Kuvatka (Russian: Куватка) is a rural locality (a village) in Bratsky District, Irkutsk Oblast, Russia. Population: 825 (2010 census);

== Geography ==
This rural locality is located 75 kilometres (47 mi) from Bratsk (the district's administrative centre), 386 kilometres (240 mi) from Irkutsk (capital of Irkutsk Oblast) and 4,052 kilometres (2,518 mi) from Moscow. Kharanzhino is the nearest rural locality.
