= Baysha =

Baysha Байша
- Village
- Location within Irkutsk Oblast Location within Russia
- Coordinates: 53°22′N 105°37′E
- Country: Russia
- Region: Irkutsk Oblast
- District: Bayandayevsky District
- Time zone: UTC+8:00

Baysha (Russian: Байша) is a rural locality (a selo) in Bayandayevsky District, Irkutsk Oblast, Russia. Population: 259 (2010 census);

== Geography ==
This rural locality is located 36 kilometres (22 mi) from Bayanday (the district's administrative centre), 150 kilometres (93 mi) from Irkutsk (capital of Irkutsk Oblast) and 4,520 kilometres (2,810 mi) from Moscow. Tukhum is the nearest rural locality.
