= Savvateyevka =

Savvateyevka Савватеевка
- Village
- Location within Irkutsk Oblast Location within Russia
- Coordinates: 52°19′N 103°38′E
- Country: Russia
- Region: Irkutsk Oblast
- District: Angarsky District
- Time zone: UTC+8:00

Savvateyevka (Russian: Савватеевка) is a rural locality (a selo) in Angarsky District, Irkutsk Oblast, Russia. Population: 1,403 (2010 census);

== Geography ==
This rural locality is located 29 kilometres (18 mi) from Angarsk (the district's administrative centre), 44 kilometres (27 mi) from Irkutsk (capital of Irkutsk Oblast) and 4,502 kilometres (2,797 mi) from Moscow. Zvyozdochka is the nearest rural locality.
