= Nagalyk =

Nagalyk Нагалык
- Village
- Location within Irkutsk Oblast Location within Russia
- Coordinates: 53°06′N 105°18′E
- Country: Russia
- Region: Irkutsk Oblast
- District: Bayandayevsky District
- Time zone: UTC+8:00

Nagalyk (Russian: Нагалык) is a rural locality (a selo) in Bayandayevsky District, Irkutsk Oblast, Russia. Population: 441 (2010 census);

== Geography ==
This rural locality is located 14 kilometres (8.7 mi) from Bayanday (the district's administrative centre), 114 kilometres (71 mi) from Irkutsk (capital of Irkutsk Oblast) and 4,528 kilometres (2,814 mi) from Moscow. Nukhu-Nur is the nearest rural locality.
