= Vershininsk =

Vershininsk Вершининск
- Village
- Location within Irkutsk Oblast Location within Russia
- Coordinates: 53°13′N 105°30′E
- Country: Russia
- Region: Irkutsk Oblast
- District: Bayandayevsky District
- Time zone: UTC+8:00

Vershininsk (Russian: Вершининск) is a rural locality (a village) in Bayandayevsky District, Irkutsk Oblast, Russia. Population: 21 (2010 census);

== Geography ==
This rural locality is located 18 kilometres (11 mi) from Bayanday (the district's administrative centre), 132 kilometres (82 mi) from Irkutsk (capital of Irkutsk Oblast) and 4,529 kilometres (2,814 mi) from Moscow. Yeleninsk is the nearest rural locality.
