= Kheretin =

Kheretin Херетин
- Village
- Location within Irkutsk Oblast Location within Russia
- Coordinates: 53°09′N 103°48′E
- Country: Russia
- Region: Irkutsk Oblast
- District: Bokhansky District
- Time zone: UTC+8:00

Kheretin (Russian: Херетин) is a rural locality (a village) in Bokhansky District, Irkutsk Oblast, Russia. Population: 106 (2010 census);

== Geography ==
This rural locality is located 2 kilometres (1.2 mi) from Bokhan (the district's administrative centre), 102 kilometres (63 mi) from Irkutsk (capital of Irkutsk Oblast) and 4,422 kilometres (2,748 mi) from Moscow. Shunta is the nearest rural locality.
