= Gryaznaya =

Gryaznaya Грязная
- Village
- Location within Irkutsk Oblast Location within Russia
- Coordinates: 53°02′N 103°27′E
- Country: Russia
- Region: Irkutsk Oblast
- District: Bokhansky District
- Time zone: UTC+8:00

Gryaznaya (Russian: Грязная) is a rural locality (a village) in Bokhansky District, Irkutsk Oblast, Russia. Population: 143 (2010 census);

== Geography ==
This rural locality is located 26 kilometres (16 mi) from Bokhan (the district's administrative centre), 100 kilometres (62 mi) from Irkutsk (capital of Irkutsk Oblast) and 4,412 kilometres (2,741 mi) from Moscow. Byrgazova is the nearest rural locality.
