= Lyury =

Lyury Люры
- Village
- Location within Irkutsk Oblast Location within Russia
- Coordinates: 53°00′N 105°27′E
- Country: Russia
- Region: Irkutsk Oblast
- District: Bayandayevsky District
- Time zone: UTC+8:00

Lyury (Russian: Люры) is a rural locality (a village) in Bayandayevsky District, Irkutsk Oblast, Russia. Population: 586 (2010 census);

== Geography ==
This rural locality is located 7 kilometres (4.3 mi) from Bayanday (the district's administrative centre), 112 kilometres (70 mi) from Irkutsk (capital of Irkutsk Oblast) and 4,550 kilometres (2,830 mi) from Moscow. Bokholdoy is the nearest rural locality.
