= Sklyanka =

Sklyanka Склянка
- Village
- Location within Irkutsk Oblast Location within Russia
- Coordinates: 53°09′N 103°26′E
- Country: Russia
- Region: Irkutsk Oblast
- District: Bokhansky District
- Time zone: UTC+8:00

Sklyanka (Russian: Склянка) is a rural locality (a village) in Bokhansky District, Irkutsk Oblast, Russia. Population: 9 (2010 census); 29 (2002 census);

== Geography ==
This rural locality is located 23 kilometres (14 mi) from Bokhan (the district's administrative centre), 112 kilometres (70 mi) from Irkutsk (capital of Irkutsk Oblast) and 4,398 kilometres (2,733 mi) from Moscow. Kamenka is the nearest rural locality.
