= Kiryushina =

Kiryushina Кирюшина
- Village
- Location within Irkutsk Oblast Location within Russia
- Coordinates: 53°26′N 102°49′E
- Country: Russia
- Region: Irkutsk Oblast
- District: Alarsky District
- Time zone: UTC+8:00

Kiryushina (Russian: Кирюшина) is a rural locality (a village) in Alarsky District, Irkutsk Oblast, Russia. Population: 94 (2010 census);

== Geography ==
This rural locality is located 11 kilometres (6.8 mi) from Kutulik (the district's administrative centre), 160 kilometres (99 mi) from Irkutsk (capital of Irkutsk Oblast) and 4,327 kilometres (2,689 mi) from Moscow. Bolshaya Yerma is the nearest rural locality.
