= Under-Khuan =

Under-Khuan Ундэр-Хуан
- Village
- Location within Irkutsk Oblast Location within Russia
- Coordinates: 53°27′N 103°12′E
- Country: Russia
- Region: Irkutsk Oblast
- District: Alarsky District
- Time zone: UTC+8:00

Under-Khuan (Russian: Ундэр-Хуан) is a rural locality (a village) in Alarsky District, Irkutsk Oblast, Russia. Population: 51 (2010 census);

== Geography ==
This rural locality is located 31 kilometres (19 mi) from Kutulik (the district's administrative centre), 149 kilometres (93 mi) from Irkutsk (capital of Irkutsk Oblast) and 4,350 kilometres (2,700 mi) from Moscow. Apkhayta is the nearest rural locality.
