= Ulzet =

Ulzet Улзет
- Village
- Location within Irkutsk Oblast Location within Russia
- Coordinates: 53°06′N 102°30′E
- Country: Russia
- Region: Irkutsk Oblast
- District: Alarsky District
- Time zone: UTC+8:00

Ulzet (Russian: Улзет) is a rural locality (a village) in Alarsky District, Irkutsk Oblast, Russia. Population: 9 (2010 census);

== Geography ==
This rural locality is located 33 kilometres (21 mi) from Kutulik (the district's administrative centre), 150 kilometres (93 mi) from Irkutsk (capital of Irkutsk Oblast) and 4,341 kilometres (2,697 mi) from Moscow. Alar is the nearest rural locality.
