= Shunta, Irkutsk Oblast =

Shunta Шунта
- Village
- Location within Irkutsk Oblast Location within Russia
- Coordinates: 53°09′N 103°49′E
- Country: Russia
- Region: Irkutsk Oblast
- District: Bokhansky District
- Time zone: UTC+8:00

Shunta (Russian: Шунта) is a rural locality (a village) in Bokhansky District, Irkutsk Oblast, Russia. Population: 221 (2010 census);

== Geography ==
This rural locality is located 3 kilometres (1.9 mi) from Bokhan (the district's administrative centre), 101 kilometres (63 mi) from Irkutsk (capital of Irkutsk Oblast) and 4,424 kilometres (2,749 mi) from Moscow. Kheretin is the nearest rural locality.
