= Nareny =

Nareny Нарены
- Village
- Location within Irkutsk Oblast Location within Russia
- Coordinates: 53°13′N 102°48′E
- Country: Russia
- Region: Irkutsk Oblast
- District: Alarsky District
- Time zone: UTC+8:00

Nareny (Russian: Нарены) is a rural locality (a village) in Alarsky District, Irkutsk Oblast, Russia. Population: 160 (2010 census);

== Geography ==
This rural locality is located 13 kilometres (8.1 mi) from Kutulik (the district's administrative centre), 144 kilometres (89 mi) from Irkutsk (capital of Irkutsk Oblast) and 4,348 kilometres (2,702 mi) from Moscow. Omulevka is the nearest rural locality.
