= Ukyr, Irkutsk Oblast =

Ukyr Укыр
- Village
- Location within Irkutsk Oblast Location within Russia
- Coordinates: 53°08′N 104°08′E
- Country: Russia
- Region: Irkutsk Oblast
- District: Bokhansky District
- Time zone: UTC+8:00

Ukyr (Russian: Укыр) is a rural locality (a selo) in Bokhansky District, Irkutsk Oblast, Russia. Population: 564 (2010 census);

== Geography ==
This rural locality is located 24 kilometres (15 mi) from Bokhan (the district's administrative centre), 96 kilometres (60 mi) from Irkutsk (capital of Irkutsk Oblast) and 4,446 kilometres (2,763 mi) from Moscow. Khorgelok is the nearest rural locality.
