= Idygey =

Idygey Идыгей
- Village
- Location within Irkutsk Oblast Location within Russia
- Coordinates: 53°00′N 105°16′E
- Country: Russia
- Region: Irkutsk Oblast
- District: Bayandayevsky District
- Time zone: UTC+8:00

Idygey (Russian: Идыгей) is a rural locality (a village) in Bayandayevsky District, Irkutsk Oblast, Russia. Population: 99 (2010 census);

== Geography ==
This rural locality is located 17 kilometres (11 mi) from Bayanday (the district's administrative centre), 104 kilometres (65 mi) from Irkutsk (capital of Irkutsk Oblast) and 4,537 kilometres (2,819 mi) from Moscow. Maraltuy is the nearest rural locality.
