= Khiginskaya =

Khiginskaya Хигинская
- Village
- Location within Irkutsk Oblast Location within Russia
- Coordinates: 53°07′N 102°40′E
- Country: Russia
- Region: Irkutsk Oblast
- District: Alarsky District
- Time zone: UTC+8:00

Khiginskaya (Russian: Хигинская) is a rural locality (a village) in Alarsky District, Irkutsk Oblast, Russia. Population: 63 (2010 census);

== Geography ==
This rural locality is located 26 kilometres (16 mi) from Kutulik (the district's administrative centre), 141 kilometres (88 mi) from Irkutsk (capital of Irkutsk Oblast) and 4,351 kilometres (2,704 mi) from Moscow. Alzobey is the nearest rural locality.
