= Vanteyevskaya =

Vanteyevskaya Вантеевская
- Village
- Location within Irkutsk Oblast Location within Russia
- Coordinates: 53°11′N 103°29′E
- Country: Russia
- Region: Irkutsk Oblast
- District: Bokhansky District
- Time zone: UTC+8:00

Vanteyevskaya (Russian: Вантеевская) is a rural locality (a village) in Bokhansky District, Irkutsk Oblast, Russia. Population: 15 (2010 census);

== Geography ==
This rural locality is located 20 kilometres (12 mi) from Bokhan (the district's administrative centre), 114 kilometres (71 mi) from Irkutsk (capital of Irkutsk Oblast) and 4,397 kilometres (2,732 mi) from Moscow. Makarovskaya is the nearest rural locality.
