= Barchim =

Barchim Барчим
- Village
- Location within Irkutsk Oblast Location within Russia
- Coordinates: 55°22′N 100°47′E
- Country: Russia
- Region: Irkutsk Oblast
- District: Bratsky District
- Time zone: UTC+8:00

Barchim (Russian: Барчим) is a rural locality (a village) in Bratsky District, Irkutsk Oblast, Russia. Population: 187 (2010 census);

== Geography ==
This rural locality is located 102 kilometres (63 mi) from Bratsk (the district's administrative centre), 407 kilometres (253 mi) from Irkutsk (capital of Irkutsk Oblast) and 3,993 kilometres (2,481 mi) from Moscow. Tem is the nearest rural locality.
