= Byrgazova =

Byrgazova Быргазова
- Village
- Location within Irkutsk Oblast Location within Russia
- Coordinates: 53°02′N 103°32′E
- Country: Russia
- Region: Irkutsk Oblast
- District: Bokhansky District
- Time zone: UTC+8:00

Byrgazova (Russian: Быргазова) is a rural locality (a village) in Bokhansky District, Irkutsk Oblast, Russia. Population: 150 (2010 census);

== Geography ==
This rural locality is located 21 kilometres (13 mi) from Bokhan (the district's administrative centre), 98 kilometres (61 mi) from Irkutsk (capital of Irkutsk Oblast) and 4,417 kilometres (2,745 mi) from Moscow. Sharagun is the nearest rural locality.
