= Odisa, Irkutsk Oblast =

Odisa Одиса
- Village
- Location within Irkutsk Oblast Location within Russia
- Coordinates: 54°00′N 102°57′E
- Country: Russia
- Region: Irkutsk Oblast
- District: Balagansky District
- Time zone: UTC+8:00

Odisa (Russian: Одиса) is a rural locality (a village) in Balagansky District, Irkutsk Oblast, Russia. Population: 25 (2010 census);

== Geography ==
This rural locality is located 6 kilometres (3.7 mi) from Balagansk (the district's administrative centre), 210 kilometres (130 mi) from Irkutsk (capital of Irkutsk Oblast) and 4,274 kilometres (2,656 mi) from Moscow. Balagansk is the nearest rural locality.
