= Shamanka, Bayandayevsky District =

Shamanka Шаманка
- Village
- Location within Irkutsk Oblast Location within Russia
- Coordinates: 53°07′N 105°35′E
- Country: Russia
- Region: Irkutsk Oblast
- District: Bayandayevsky District
- Time zone: UTC+8:00

Shamanka (Russian: Шаманка) is a rural locality (a village) in Bayandayevsky District, Irkutsk Oblast, Russia. Population: 258 (2010 census);

== Geography ==
This rural locality is located 10 kilometres (6.2 mi) from Balagansk (the district's administrative centre), 128 kilometres (80 mi) from Irkutsk (capital of Irkutsk Oblast) and 4,545 kilometres (2,824 mi) from Moscow. Polovinka is the nearest rural locality.
