= Duta, Irkutsk Oblast =

Duta Дута
- Village
- Location within Irkutsk Oblast Location within Russia
- Coordinates: 53°25′N 102°57′E
- Country: Russia
- Region: Irkutsk Oblast
- District: Alarsky District
- Time zone: UTC+8:00

Duta (Russian: Дута) is a rural locality (a village) in Alarsky District, Irkutsk Oblast, Russia. Population: 96 (2010 census);

== Geography ==
This rural locality is located 14 kilometres (8.7 mi) from Kutulik (the district's administrative centre), 153 kilometres (95 mi) from Irkutsk (capital of Irkutsk Oblast) and 4,338 kilometres (2,696 mi) from Moscow. Tabarsuk is the nearest rural locality.
