= Alar, Irkutsk Oblast =

Alar Аларь
- Village
- Location within Irkutsk Oblast Location within Russia
- Coordinates: 53°04′N 102°32′E
- Country: Russia
- Region: Irkutsk Oblast
- District: Alarsky District
- Time zone: UTC+8:00

Alar (Russian: Аларь) is a rural locality (a selo) in Alarsky District, Irkutsk Oblast, Russia. Population: 1,158 (2010 census);

== Geography ==
This rural locality is located 35 kilometres (22 mi) from Kutulik (the district's administrative centre), 145 kilometres (90 mi) from Irkutsk (capital of Irkutsk Oblast) and 4,348 kilometres (2,702 mi) from Moscow. Ulzet is the nearest rural locality.
