= Arshan, Alarsky District =

Arshan Аршан
- Village
- Location within Irkutsk Oblast Location within Russia
- Coordinates: 53°08′N 102°45′E
- Country: Russia
- Region: Irkutsk Oblast
- District: Alarsky District
- Time zone: UTC+8:00

Arshan (Russian: Аршан) is a rural locality (a village) in Alarsky District, Irkutsk Oblast, Russia. Population: 82 (2010 census);

== Geography ==
This rural locality is located 23 kilometres (14 mi) from Kutulik (the district's administrative centre), 139 kilometres (86 mi) from Irkutsk (capital of Irkutsk Oblast) and 4,355 kilometres (2,706 mi) from Moscow. Ideal is the nearest rural locality.
