= Ideal, Irkutsk Oblast =

Ideal Идеал
- Village
- Location within Irkutsk Oblast Location within Russia
- Coordinates: 53°09′N 102°41′E
- Country: Russia
- Region: Irkutsk Oblast
- District: Alarsky District
- Time zone: UTC+8:00

Ideal (Russian: Идеал) is a rural locality (a selo) in Alarsky District, Irkutsk Oblast, Russia. Population: 503 (2010 census);

== Geography ==
This rural locality is located 22 kilometres (14 mi) from Kutulik (the district's administrative centre), 143 kilometres (89 mi) from Irkutsk (capital of Irkutsk Oblast) and 4,348 kilometres (2,702 mi) from Moscow. Zarechnoye is the nearest rural locality.
