= Kulakova, Irkutsk Oblast =

Kulakova Кулакова
- Village
- Location within Irkutsk Oblast Location within Russia
- Coordinates: 52°58′N 103°35′E
- Country: Russia
- Region: Irkutsk Oblast
- District: Bokhansky District
- Time zone: UTC+8:00

Kulakova (Russian: Кулакова) is a rural locality (a village) in Bokhansky District, Irkutsk Oblast, Russia. Population: 150 (2010 census);

== Geography ==
This rural locality is located 24 kilometres (15 mi) from Bokhan (the district's administrative centre), 89 kilometres (55 mi) from Irkutsk (capital of Irkutsk Oblast) and 4,428 kilometres (2,751 mi) from Moscow. Buret is the nearest rural locality.
