= Kumeyka =

Kumeyka Кумейка
- Village
- Location within Irkutsk Oblast Location within Russia
- Coordinates: 55°32′N 101°46′E
- Country: Russia
- Region: Irkutsk Oblast
- District: Bratsky District
- Time zone: UTC+8:00

Kumeyka (Russian: Кумейка) is a rural locality (a village) in Bratsky District, Irkutsk Oblast, Russia. Population: 440 (2010 census);

== Geography ==
This rural locality is located 69 kilometres (43 mi) from Bratsk (the district's administrative centre), 394 kilometres (245 mi) from Irkutsk (capital of Irkutsk Oblast) and 4,037 kilometres (2,508 mi) from Moscow. Klyuchi-Bulak is the nearest rural locality.
