= Pribrezhny, Irkutsk Oblast =

Pribrezhny Прибрежный
- Village
- Location within Irkutsk Oblast Location within Russia
- Coordinates: 55°12′N 100°41′E
- Country: Russia
- Region: Irkutsk Oblast
- District: Bratsky District
- Time zone: UTC+8:00

Pribrezhny (Russian: Прибрежный) is a rural locality (a settlement) in Bratsky District, Irkutsk Oblast, Russia. Population: 2,555 (2010 census); 2,885 (2002 census);

== Geography ==
This rural locality is located 121 kilometres (75 mi) from Bratsk (the district's administrative centre), 396 kilometres (246 mi) from Irkutsk (capital of Irkutsk Oblast) and 4,003 kilometres (2,487 mi) from Moscow. Ilir is the nearest rural locality.
