= Loganova =

Loganova Логанова
- Village
- Location within Irkutsk Oblast Location within Russia
- Coordinates: 53°17′N 103°33′E
- Country: Russia
- Region: Irkutsk Oblast
- District: Bokhansky District
- Time zone: UTC+8:00

Loganova (Russian: Логанова) is a rural locality (a village) in Bokhansky District, Irkutsk Oblast, Russia. Population: 178 (2010 census);

== Geography ==
This rural locality is located 21 kilometres (13 mi) from Bokhan (the district's administrative centre), 121 kilometres (75 mi) from Irkutsk (capital of Irkutsk Oblast) and 4,392 kilometres (2,729 mi) from Moscow. Tymyrey is the nearest rural locality.
