= Shitkhulun =

Shitkhulun Шитхулун
- Village
- Location within Irkutsk Oblast Location within Russia
- Coordinates: 53°19′N 105°56′E
- Country: Russia
- Region: Irkutsk Oblast
- District: Bayandayevsky District
- Time zone: UTC+8:00

Shitkhulun (Russian: Шитхулун) is a rural locality (a village) in Bayandayevsky District, Irkutsk Oblast, Russia. Population: 153 (2010 census);

== Geography ==
This rural locality is located 41 kilometres (25 mi) from Balagansk (the district's administrative centre), 159 kilometres (99 mi) from Irkutsk (capital of Irkutsk Oblast) and 4,546 kilometres (2,825 mi) from Moscow. Kayzaran is the nearest rural locality.
