= Udarnik, Irkutsk Oblast =

Udarnik Ударник
- Village
- Location within Irkutsk Oblast Location within Russia
- Coordinates: 52°25′N 104°04′E
- Country: Russia
- Region: Irkutsk Oblast
- District: Angarsky District
- Time zone: UTC+8:00

Udarnik (Russian: Ударник) is a rural locality (a settlement) in Angarsky District, Irkutsk Oblast, Russia. Population: 144 (2010 census);

== Geography ==
This rural locality is located 17 kilometres (11 mi) from Angarsk (the district's administrative centre), 22 kilometres (14 mi) from Irkutsk (capital of Irkutsk Oblast) and 4,520 kilometres (2,810 mi) from Moscow. Meget is the nearest rural locality.
