= Sharagun =

Sharagun Шарагун
- Village
- Location within Irkutsk Oblast Location within Russia
- Coordinates: 53°03′N 103°33′E
- Country: Russia
- Region: Irkutsk Oblast
- District: Bokhansky District
- Time zone: UTC+8:00

Sharagun (Russian: Шарагун) is a rural locality (a village) in Bokhansky District, Irkutsk Oblast, Russia. Population: 78 (2010 census);

== Geography ==
This rural locality is located 17 kilometres (11 mi) from Bokhan (the district's administrative centre), 99 kilometres (62 mi) from Irkutsk (capital of Irkutsk Oblast) and 4,416 kilometres (2,744 mi) from Moscow. Byrgazova is the nearest rural locality.
