= Aleksandrovskoye, Irkutsk Oblast =

Aleksandrovskoye Александровское
- Village
- Location within Irkutsk Oblast Location within Russia
- Coordinates: 52°47′N 103°50′E
- Country: Russia
- Region: Irkutsk Oblast
- District: Bokhansky District
- Time zone: UTC+8:00

Aleksandrovskoye (Russian: Александровское) is a rural locality (a village) in Bokhansky District, Irkutsk Oblast, Russia. Population: 1,612 (2010 census);

== Geography ==
This rural locality is located 40 kilometres (25 mi) from Bokhan (the district's administrative centre), 64 kilometres (40 mi) from Irkutsk (capital of Irkutsk Oblast) and 4,465 kilometres (2,774 mi) from Moscow. Klyuchi is the nearest rural locality.
