= Shelemina =

Shelemina Шелемина
- Village
- Location within Irkutsk Oblast Location within Russia
- Coordinates: 53°26′N 102°45′E
- Country: Russia
- Region: Irkutsk Oblast
- District: Alarsky District
- Time zone: UTC+8:00

Shelemina (Russian: Шелемина) is a rural locality (a village) in Alarsky District, Irkutsk Oblast, Russia. Population: 6 (2010 census);

== Geography ==
This rural locality is located 10 kilometres (6.2 mi) from Kutulik (the district's administrative centre), 163 kilometres (101 mi) from Irkutsk (capital of Irkutsk Oblast) and 4,323 kilometres (2,686 mi) from Moscow. Bolshaya Yerma is the nearest rural locality.
