= Ilir, Irkutsk Oblast =

Ilir Илир
- Village
- Location within Irkutsk Oblast Location within Russia
- Coordinates: 55°13′N 100°40′E
- Country: Russia
- Region: Irkutsk Oblast
- District: Bratsky District
- Time zone: UTC+8:00

Ilir (Russian: Илир) is a rural locality (a selo) in Bratsky District, Irkutsk Oblast, Russia. Population: 1,158 (2010 census);

== Geography ==
This rural locality is located 119 kilometres (74 mi) from Bratsk (the district's administrative centre), 399 kilometres (248 mi) from Irkutsk (capital of Irkutsk Oblast) and 4,000 kilometres (2,500 mi) from Moscow. Pribrezhny is the nearest rural locality.
