= Ivanicheskoye =

Ivanicheskoye Иваническое
- Village
- Location within Irkutsk Oblast Location within Russia
- Coordinates: 53°11′N 102°20′E
- Country: Russia
- Region: Irkutsk Oblast
- District: Alarsky District
- Time zone: UTC+8:00

Ivanicheskoye (Russian: Иваническое) is a rural locality (a selo) in Alarsky District, Irkutsk Oblast, Russia. Population: 677 (2010 census);

== Geography ==
This rural locality is located 35 kilometres (22 mi) from Kutulik (the district's administrative centre), 164 kilometres (102 mi) from Irkutsk (capital of Irkutsk Oblast) and 4,320 kilometres (2,680 mi) from Moscow. Shaloty is the nearest rural locality.
