= Tachigir =

Tachigir Тачигир
- Village
- Location within Irkutsk Oblast Location within Russia
- Coordinates: 53°08′N 104°11′E
- Country: Russia
- Region: Irkutsk Oblast
- District: Bokhansky District
- Time zone: UTC+8:00

Tachigir (Russian: Тачигир) is a rural locality (a village) in Bokhansky District, Irkutsk Oblast, Russia. Population: 60 (2010 census);

== Geography ==
This rural locality is located 27 kilometres (17 mi) from Bokhan (the district's administrative centre), 95 kilometres (59 mi) from Irkutsk (capital of Irkutsk Oblast) and 4,450 kilometres (2,770 mi) from Moscow. Khorgelok is the nearest rural locality.
