= Anuchinsk =

Anuchinsk Анучинск
- Village
- Location within Irkutsk Oblast Location within Russia
- Coordinates: 54°03′N 102°35′E
- Country: Russia
- Region: Irkutsk Oblast
- District: Balagansky District
- Time zone: UTC+8:00

Anuchinsk (Russian: Анучинск) is a rural locality (a village) in Balagansky District, Irkutsk Oblast, Russia. Population: 128 (2010 census);

== Geography ==
This rural locality is located 31 kilometres (19 mi) from Balagansk (the district's administrative centre), 225 kilometres (140 mi) from Irkutsk (capital of Irkutsk Oblast) and 4,245 kilometres (2,638 mi) from Moscow. Pobedinskaya is the nearest rural locality.
