= Tarasa, Irkutsk Oblast =

Tarasa Тараса
- Village
- Location within Irkutsk Oblast Location within Russia
- Coordinates: 52°00′N 103°00′E
- Country: Russia
- Region: Irkutsk Oblast
- District: Bokhansky District
- Time zone: UTC+8:00

Tarasa (Russian: Тараса) is a rural locality (a selo) in Bokhansky District, Irkutsk Oblast, Russia. Population: 1,220 (2010 census);

== Geography ==
This rural locality is located 7 kilometres (4.3 mi) from Bokhan (the district's administrative centre), 95 kilometres (59 mi) from Irkutsk (capital of Irkutsk Oblast) and 4,428 kilometres (2,751 mi) from Moscow. Bokhan is the nearest rural locality.
