= Kartygey =

Kartygey Картыгей
- Village
- Location within Irkutsk Oblast Location within Russia
- Coordinates: 53°26′N 103°30′E
- Country: Russia
- Region: Irkutsk Oblast
- District: Bokhansky District
- Time zone: UTC+8:00

Kartygey (Russian: Картыгей) is a rural locality (a village) in Bokhansky District, Irkutsk Oblast, Russia. Population: 82 (2010 census);

== Geography ==
This rural locality is located 36 kilometres (22 mi) from Bokhan (the district's administrative centre), 338 kilometres (210 mi) from Irkutsk (capital of Irkutsk Oblast) and 4,372 kilometres (2,717 mi) from Moscow. Donskaya is the nearest rural locality.
