= Tashlykova =

Tashlykova Ташлыкова
- Village
- Location within Irkutsk Oblast Location within Russia
- Coordinates: 53°53′N 103°05′E
- Country: Russia
- Region: Irkutsk Oblast
- District: Balagansky District
- Time zone: UTC+8:00

Tashlykova (Russian: Ташлыкова) is a rural locality (a village) in Balagansky District, Irkutsk Oblast, Russia. Population: 204 (2010 census);

== Geography ==
This rural locality is located 13 kilometres (8.1 mi) from Balagansk (the district's administrative centre), 195 kilometres (121 mi) from Irkutsk (capital of Irkutsk Oblast) and 4,295 kilometres (2,669 mi) from Moscow. Druzhny is the nearest rural locality.
