= Moloy, Irkutsk Oblast =

Moloy Молой
- Village
- Location within Irkutsk Oblast Location within Russia
- Coordinates: 53°02′N 105°17′E
- Country: Russia
- Region: Irkutsk Oblast
- District: Bayandayevsky District
- Time zone: UTC+8:00

Moloy (Russian: Молой) is a rural locality (a village) in Bayandayevsky District, Irkutsk Oblast, Russia. Population: 62 (2010 census);

== Geography ==
This rural locality is located 15 kilometres (9.3 mi) from Bayanday (the district's administrative centre), 107 kilometres (66 mi) from Irkutsk (capital of Irkutsk Oblast) and 4,535 kilometres (2,818 mi) from Moscow. Badaguy is the nearest rural locality.
