= Kokorina, Irkutsk Oblast =

Kokorina Кокорина
- Village
- Location within Irkutsk Oblast Location within Russia
- Coordinates: 53°05′N 105°09′E
- Country: Russia
- Region: Irkutsk Oblast
- District: Bayandayevsky District
- Time zone: UTC+8:00

Kokorina (Russian: Кокорина) is a rural locality (a village) in Bayandayevsky District, Irkutsk Oblast, Russia. Population: 264 (2010 census);

== Geography ==
This rural locality is located 23 kilometres (14 mi) from Bayanday (the district's administrative centre), 107 kilometres (66 mi) from Irkutsk (capital of Irkutsk Oblast) and 4,521 kilometres (2,809 mi) from Moscow. Novonikolayevsk is the nearest rural locality.
