= Khuruy =

Khuruy Хуруй
- Village
- Location within Irkutsk Oblast Location within Russia
- Coordinates: 53°22′N 102°58′E
- Country: Russia
- Region: Irkutsk Oblast
- District: Alarsky District
- Time zone: UTC+8:00

Khuruy (Russian: Хуруй) is a rural locality (a village) in Alarsky District, Irkutsk Oblast, Russia. Population: 200 (2010 census);

== Geography ==
This rural locality is located 13 kilometres (8.1 mi) from Kutulik (the district's administrative centre), 149 kilometres (93 mi) from Irkutsk (capital of Irkutsk Oblast) and 4,344 kilometres (2,699 mi) from Moscow. Molta is the nearest rural locality.
