= Bolshaya Yerma =

Bolshaya Yerma Большая Ерма
- Village
- Location within Irkutsk Oblast Location within Russia
- Coordinates: 53°26′N 102°47′E
- Country: Russia
- Region: Irkutsk Oblast
- District: Alarsky District
- Time zone: UTC+8:00

Bolshaya Yerma (Russian: Большая Ерма) is a rural locality (a village) in Alarsky District, Irkutsk Oblast, Russia. Population: 19 (2010 census);

== Geography ==
This rural locality is located 11 kilometres (6.8 mi) from Kutulik (the district's administrative centre), 162 kilometres (101 mi) from Irkutsk (capital of Irkutsk Oblast) and 4,324 kilometres (2,687 mi) from Moscow. Kiryushina is the nearest rural locality.
