= Nukhu-Nur =

Nukhu-Nur Нуху-Нур
- Village
- Location within Irkutsk Oblast Location within Russia
- Coordinates: 53°09′N 105°20′E
- Country: Russia
- Region: Irkutsk Oblast
- District: Bayandayevsky District
- Time zone: UTC+8:00

Nukhu-Nur (Russian: Нуху-Нур) is a rural locality (a village) in Bayandayevsky District, Irkutsk Oblast, Russia. Population: 85 (2010 census);

== Geography ==
This rural locality is located 15 kilometres (9.3 mi) from Bayanday (the district's administrative centre), 119 kilometres (74 mi) from Irkutsk (capital of Irkutsk Oblast) and 4,525 kilometres (2,812 mi) from Moscow. Nagalyk is the nearest rural locality.
