= Karakhun =

Karakhun Карахун
- Village
- Location within Irkutsk Oblast Location within Russia
- Coordinates: 55°35′N 103°09′E
- Country: Russia
- Region: Irkutsk Oblast
- District: Bratsky District
- Time zone: UTC+8:00

Karakhun (Russian: Карахун) is a rural locality (a settlement) in Bratsky District, Irkutsk Oblast, Russia. Population: 648 (2010 census);

== Geography ==
This rural locality is located 115 kilometres (71 mi) from Bratsk (the district's administrative centre), 374 kilometres (232 mi) from Irkutsk (capital of Irkutsk Oblast) and 4,119 kilometres (2,559 mi) from Moscow. Priboyny is the nearest rural locality.
