= Mankova =

Mankova Манькова
- Village
- Location within Irkutsk Oblast Location within Russia
- Coordinates: 53°07′N 104°03′E
- Country: Russia
- Region: Irkutsk Oblast
- District: Bokhansky District
- Time zone: UTC+8:00

Mankova (Russian: Манькова) is a rural locality (a village) in Bokhansky District, Irkutsk Oblast, Russia. Population: 208 (2010 census);

== Geography ==
This rural locality is located 19 kilometres (12 mi) from Bokhan (the district's administrative centre), 95 kilometres (59 mi) from Irkutsk (capital of Irkutsk Oblast) and 4,442 kilometres (2,760 mi) from Moscow. Ust-Ukyr is the nearest rural locality.
