= Bazoy =

Bazoy Базой
- Village
- Location within Irkutsk Oblast Location within Russia
- Coordinates: 53°06′N 104°23′E
- Country: Russia
- Region: Irkutsk Oblast
- District: Bokhansky District
- Time zone: UTC+8:00

Bazoy (Russian: Базой) is a rural locality (a village) in Bokhansky District, Irkutsk Oblast, Russia. Population: 9 (2010 census);

== Geography ==
This rural locality is located 41 kilometres (25 mi) from Bokhan (the district's administrative centre), 91 kilometres (57 mi) from Irkutsk (capital of Irkutsk Oblast) and 4,467 kilometres (2,776 mi) from Moscow. Granichnaya is the nearest rural locality.
