= Zony, Irkutsk Oblast =

Zony Зоны
- Village
- Location within Irkutsk Oblast Location within Russia
- Coordinates: 53°18′N 102°32′E
- Country: Russia
- Region: Irkutsk Oblast
- District: Alarsky District
- Time zone: UTC+8:00

Zony (Russian: Зоны) is a rural locality (a selo) in Alarsky District, Irkutsk Oblast, Russia. Population: 200 (2010 census);

== Geography ==
This rural locality is located 18 kilometres (11 mi) from Kutulik (the district's administrative centre), 163 kilometres (101 mi) from Irkutsk (capital of Irkutsk Oblast) and 4,321 kilometres (2,685 mi) from Moscow. Zavidnaya is the nearest rural locality.
