= Typkysyr =

Typkysyr Тыпкысыр
- Village
- Location within Irkutsk Oblast Location within Russia
- Coordinates: 53°03′N 105°22′E
- Country: Russia
- Region: Irkutsk Oblast
- District: Bayandayevsky District
- Time zone: UTC+8:00

Typkysyr (Russian: Тыпкысыр) is a rural locality (a village) in Bayandayevsky District, Irkutsk Oblast, Russia. Population: 10 (2010 census);

== Geography ==
This rural locality is located 8 kilometres (5.0 mi) from Balagansk (the district's administrative centre), 113 kilometres (70 mi) from Irkutsk (capital of Irkutsk Oblast) and 4,538 kilometres (2,820 mi) from Moscow. Moloy is the nearest rural locality.
