= Shekhargun =

Shekhargun Шехаргун
- Village
- Location within Irkutsk Oblast Location within Russia
- Coordinates: 53°05′N 105°32′E
- Country: Russia
- Region: Irkutsk Oblast
- District: Bayandayevsky District
- Time zone: UTC+8:00

Shekhargun (Russian: Шехаргун) is a rural locality (a village) in Bayandayevsky District, Irkutsk Oblast, Russia. Population: 50 (2010 census);

== Geography ==
This rural locality is located 5 kilometres (3.1 mi) from Balagansk (the district's administrative centre), 124 kilometres (77 mi) from Irkutsk (capital of Irkutsk Oblast) and 4,545 kilometres (2,824 mi) from Moscow. Pokrovka is the nearest rural locality.
