= Alyaty, Irkutsk Oblast =

Alyaty Аляты
- Village
- Location within Irkutsk Oblast Location within Russia
- Coordinates: 53°12′N 102°13′E
- Country: Russia
- Region: Irkutsk Oblast
- District: Alarsky District
- Time zone: UTC+8:00

Alyaty (Russian: Аляты) is a rural locality (a selo) in Alarsky District, Irkutsk Oblast, Russia. Population: 739 (2010 census);

== Geography ==
This rural locality is located 41 kilometres (25 mi) from Kutulik (the district's administrative centre), 171 kilometres (106 mi) from Irkutsk (capital of Irkutsk Oblast) and 4,312 kilometres (2,679 mi) from Moscow. Klyuchi is the nearest rural locality.
