= Molta =

Molta Мольта
- Village
- Location within Irkutsk Oblast Location within Russia
- Coordinates: 53°21′N 103°03′E
- Country: Russia
- Region: Irkutsk Oblast
- District: Alarsky District
- Time zone: UTC+8:00

Molta (Russian: Мольта) is a rural locality (a village) in Alarsky District, Irkutsk Oblast, Russia. Population: 173 (2010 census);

== Geography ==
This rural locality is located 17 kilometres (11 mi) from Kutulik (the district's administrative centre), 145 kilometres (90 mi) from Irkutsk (capital of Irkutsk Oblast) and 4,350 kilometres (2,700 mi) from Moscow. Apkhulta is the nearest rural locality.
