= Nagatay =

Nagatay Нагатай
- Village
- Location within Irkutsk Oblast Location within Russia
- Coordinates: 53°28′N 105°46′E
- Country: Russia
- Region: Irkutsk Oblast
- District: Bayandayevsky District
- Time zone: UTC+8:00

Nagatay (Russian: Нагатай) is a rural locality (a village) in Bayandayevsky District, Irkutsk Oblast, Russia. Population: 81 (2010 census);

== Geography ==
This rural locality is located 49 kilometres (30 mi) from Bayanday (the district's administrative centre), 165 kilometres (103 mi) from Irkutsk (capital of Irkutsk Oblast) and 4,519 kilometres (2,808 mi) from Moscow. Tukhum is the nearest rural locality.
