= Bambuy =

Bambuy Бамбуй
- Village
- Location within Irkutsk Oblast Location within Russia
- Coordinates: 56°05′N 101°12′E
- Country: Russia
- Region: Irkutsk Oblast
- District: Bratsky District
- Time zone: UTC+8:00

Bambuy (Russian: Бамбуй) is a rural locality (a settlement) in Bratsky District, Irkutsk Oblast, Russia. Population: 19 (2010 census);

== Geography ==
This rural locality is located 27 kilometres (17 mi) from Bratsk (the district's administrative centre), 465 kilometres (289 mi) from Irkutsk (capital of Irkutsk Oblast) and 3,944 kilometres (2,451 mi) from Moscow. Kuznetsovka is the nearest rural locality.
