= Bolsheokinskoye =

Bolsheokinskoye Большеокинское
- Village
- Location within Irkutsk Oblast Location within Russia
- Coordinates: 55°44′N 101°44′E
- Country: Russia
- Region: Irkutsk Oblast
- District: Bratsky District
- Time zone: UTC+8:00

Bolsheokinskoye (Russian: Большеокинское) is a rural locality (a selo) in Bratsky District, Irkutsk Oblast, Russia. Population: 1,105 (2010 census);

== Geography ==
This rural locality is located 46 kilometres (29 mi) from Bratsk (the district's administrative centre), 416 kilometres (258 mi) from Irkutsk (capital of Irkutsk Oblast) and 4,014 kilometres (2,494 mi) from Moscow. Kaltuk is the nearest rural locality.
