= Malomoleva =

Malomoleva Маломолева
- Village
- Location within Irkutsk Oblast Location within Russia
- Coordinates: 53°24′N 102°50′E
- Country: Russia
- Region: Irkutsk Oblast
- District: Alarsky District
- Time zone: UTC+8:00

Malomoleva (Russian: Маломолева) is a rural locality (a village) in Alarsky District, Irkutsk Oblast, Russia. Population: 198 (2010 census);

== Geography ==
This rural locality is located 7 kilometres (4.3 mi) from Kutulik (the district's administrative centre), 156 kilometres (97 mi) from Irkutsk (capital of Irkutsk Oblast) and 4,332 kilometres (2,692 mi) from Moscow. Mogoy is the nearest rural locality.
