= Apkhayta =

Apkhayta Апхайта
- Village
- Location within Irkutsk Oblast Location within Russia
- Coordinates: 53°24′N 103°12′E
- Country: Russia
- Region: Irkutsk Oblast
- District: Alarsky District
- Time zone: UTC+8:00

Apkhayta (Russian: Апхайта) is a rural locality (a village) in Alarsky District, Irkutsk Oblast, Russia. Population: 145 (2010 census);

== Geography ==
This rural locality is located 29 kilometres (18 mi) from Kutulik (the district's administrative centre), 144 kilometres (89 mi) from Irkutsk (capital of Irkutsk Oblast) and 4,355 kilometres (2,706 mi) from Moscow. Ikinat is the nearest rural locality.
