= Leonova, Irkutsk Oblast =

Leonova Леонова
- Village
- Location within Irkutsk Oblast Location within Russia
- Coordinates: 55°33′N 101°30′E
- Country: Russia
- Region: Irkutsk Oblast
- District: Bratsky District
- Time zone: UTC+8:00

Leonova (Russian: Леонова) is a rural locality (a village) in Bratsky District, Irkutsk Oblast, Russia. Population: 474 (2010 census);

== Geography ==
This rural locality is located 66 kilometres (41 mi) from Bratsk (the district's administrative centre), 404 kilometres (251 mi) from Irkutsk (capital of Irkutsk Oblast) and 4,017 kilometres (2,496 mi) from Moscow. Klyuchi-Bulak is the nearest rural locality.
