= Kerbulak, Irkutsk Oblast =

Kerbulak Кербулак
- Village
- Location within Irkutsk Oblast Location within Russia
- Coordinates: 53°16′N 103°02′E
- Country: Russia
- Region: Irkutsk Oblast
- District: Alarsky District
- Time zone: UTC+8:00

Kerbulak (Russian: Кербулак) is a rural locality (a village) in Alarsky District, Irkutsk Oblast, Russia. Population: 101 (2010 census);

== Geography ==
This rural locality is located 18 kilometres (11 mi) from Kutulik (the district's administrative centre), 138 kilometres (86 mi) from Irkutsk (capital of Irkutsk Oblast) and 4,358 kilometres (2,708 mi) from Moscow. Yegorovskaya is the nearest rural locality.
