= Pokrovka, Bayandayevsky District =

Pokrovka Покровка
- Village
- Location within Irkutsk Oblast Location within Russia
- Coordinates: 53°04′N 105°32′E
- Country: Russia
- Region: Irkutsk Oblast
- District: Bayandayevsky District
- Time zone: UTC+8:00

Pokrovka (Russian: Покровка) is a rural locality (a village) in Bayandayevsky District, Irkutsk Oblast, Russia. Population: 635 (2010 census);

== Geography ==
This rural locality is located 3 kilometres (1.9 mi) from Bayanday (the district's administrative centre), 122 kilometres (76 mi) from Irkutsk (capital of Irkutsk Oblast) and 4,546 kilometres (2,825 mi) from Moscow. Shekhargun is the nearest rural locality.
