= Aleksandrovsk, Irkutsk Oblast =

Aleksandrovsk Александровск
- Village
- Location within Irkutsk Oblast Location within Russia
- Coordinates: 53°20′N 102°39′E
- Country: Russia
- Region: Irkutsk Oblast
- District: Alarsky District
- Time zone: UTC+8:00

Aleksandrovsk (Russian: Александровск) is a rural locality (a selo) in Alarsky District, Irkutsk Oblast, Russia. Population: 497 (2010 census);

== Geography ==
This rural locality is located 9 kilometres (5.6 mi) from Kutulik (the district's administrative centre), 159 kilometres (99 mi) from Irkutsk (capital of Irkutsk Oblast) and 4,327 kilometres (2,689 mi) from Moscow. Shapshaltuy is the nearest rural locality.
