= Kundulun, Alarsky District =

Kundulun Кундулун
- Village
- Location within Irkutsk Oblast Location within Russia
- Coordinates: 53°16′N 103°05′E
- Country: Russia
- Region: Irkutsk Oblast
- District: Alarsky District
- Time zone: UTC+8:00

Kundulun (Russian: Кундулун) is a rural locality (a village) in Alarsky District, Irkutsk Oblast, Russia. Population: 44 (2010 census);

== Geography ==
This rural locality is located 21 kilometres (13 mi) from Kutulik (the district's administrative centre), 135 kilometres (84 mi) from Irkutsk (capital of Irkutsk Oblast) and 4,362 kilometres (2,710 mi) from Moscow. Kerbulak is the nearest rural locality.
