= 4th Otdelenie Gosudarstvennoy Selektsionnoy Stantsii =

4th Otdelenie Gosudarstvennoy Selektsionnoy Stantsii 4-е Отделение Государственной Селекционной Станции
- Settlement
- Location within Irkutsk Oblast Location within Russia
- Coordinates: 54.594722°N 100.638056°E
- Country: Russia
- Region: Irkutsk Oblast
- District: Tulunsky District
- Time zone: UTC+08:00

4th Otdelenie Gosudarstvennoy Selektsionnoy Stantsii (Russian: 4-е Отделение Государственной Селекционной Станции) is a rural locality (a settlement) in Tulunsky District, Russia. The population was 883 as of 2012.

== Geography ==
The settlement is located 7 km southwest of Tulun (the district's administrative centre) by road. Tulun is the nearest rural locality.

== Streets ==
- Markina
- Masterskaya
- Mekhanizatorskaya
- Michurina
- Molodezhnaya
- Nauchnaya
- Pisareva
- Polyakova
- Sadovaya
- Teplichnaya
- Chapaeva
