= Mogoy, Irkutsk Oblast =

Mogoy Могой
- Village
- Location within Irkutsk Oblast Location within Russia
- Coordinates: 53°22′N 102°50′E
- Country: Russia
- Region: Irkutsk Oblast
- District: Alarsky District
- Time zone: UTC+8:00

Mogoy (Russian: Могой) is a rural locality (a village) in Alarsky District, Irkutsk Oblast, Russia. Population: 10 (2010 census);

== Geography ==
This rural locality is located 5 kilometres (3.1 mi) from Kutulik (the district's administrative centre), 155 kilometres (96 mi) from Irkutsk (capital of Irkutsk Oblast) and 4,334 kilometres (2,693 mi) from Moscow. Mogoyonok is the nearest rural locality.
