= Kamenka, Bokhansky District =

Kamenka Каменка
- Village
- Location within Irkutsk Oblast Location within Russia
- Coordinates: 53°10′N 103°22′E
- Country: Russia
- Region: Irkutsk Oblast
- District: Bokhansky District
- Time zone: UTC+8:00

Kamenka (Russian: Каменка) is a rural locality (a selo) in Bokhansky District, Irkutsk Oblast, Russia. Population: 200 (2010 census);

== Geography ==
This rural locality is located 27 kilometres (17 mi) from Bokhan (the district's administrative centre), 115 kilometres (71 mi) from Irkutsk (capital of Irkutsk Oblast) and 4,393 kilometres (2,730 mi) from Moscow. Sklyanka is the nearest rural locality.
