= Ulan, Irkutsk Oblast =

Ulan Улан
- Village
- Location within Irkutsk Oblast Location within Russia
- Coordinates: 53°14′N 105°43′E
- Country: Russia
- Region: Irkutsk Oblast
- District: Bayandayevsky District
- Time zone: UTC+8:00

Ulan (Russian: Улан) is a rural locality (a village) in Bayandayevsky District, Irkutsk Oblast, Russia. Population: 139 (2010 census);

== Geography ==
This rural locality is located 25 kilometres (16 mi) from Balagansk (the district's administrative centre), 143 kilometres (89 mi) from Irkutsk (capital of Irkutsk Oblast) and 4,541 kilometres (2,822 mi) from Moscow. Stary Khogot is the nearest rural locality.
