= Buryatskaya, Irkutsk Oblast =

Buryatskaya Бурятская
- Village
- Location within Irkutsk Oblast Location within Russia
- Coordinates: 53°21′N 102°26′E
- Country: Russia
- Region: Irkutsk Oblast
- District: Alarsky District
- Time zone: UTC+8:00

Buryatskaya (Russian: Бурятская) is a rural locality (a village) in Alarsky District, Irkutsk Oblast, Russia. Population: 222 (2010 census);

== Geography ==
This rural locality is located 24 kilometres (15 mi) from Kutulik (the district's administrative centre), 170 kilometres (110 mi) from Irkutsk (capital of Irkutsk Oblast) and 4,310 kilometres (2,680 mi) from Moscow. Shastina is the nearest rural locality.
