= Kaltuk =

Kaltuk Калтук
- Village
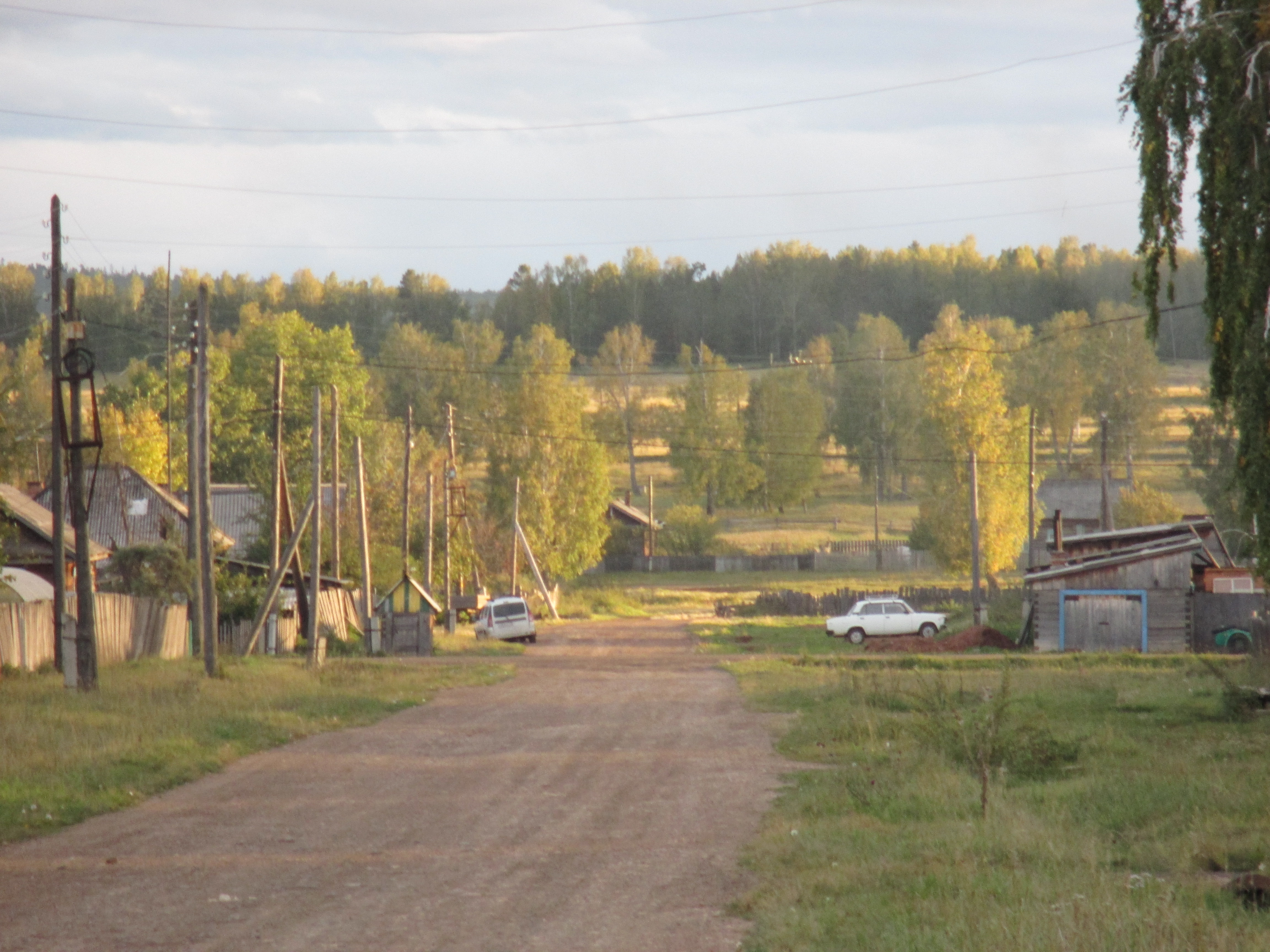

- Location within Irkutsk Oblast Location within Russia
- Coordinates: 55°40′N 101°44′E
- Country: Russia
- Region: Irkutsk Oblast
- District: Bratsky District
- Time zone: UTC+8:00

Kaltuk (Russian: Калтук) is a rural locality (a selo) in Bratsky District, Irkutsk Oblast, Russia. Population: 200 (2010 census);

== Geography ==
This rural locality is located 53 kilometres (33 mi) from Bratsk (the district's administrative centre), 409 kilometres (254 mi) from Irkutsk (capital of Irkutsk Oblast) and 4,020 kilometres (2,500 mi) from Moscow. Bolsheokinskoye is the nearest rural locality.
