= Novaya Ida =

Novaya Ida Новая Ида
- Village
- Location within Irkutsk Oblast Location within Russia
- Coordinates: 53°10′N 103°41′E
- Country: Russia
- Region: Irkutsk Oblast
- District: Bokhansky District
- Time zone: UTC+8:00

Novaya Ida (Russian: Новая Ида) is a rural locality (a selo) in Bokhansky District, Irkutsk Oblast, Russia. Population: 249 (2010 census);

== Geography ==
This rural locality is located 6 kilometres (3.7 mi) from Bokhan (the district's administrative centre), 106 kilometres (66 mi) from Irkutsk (capital of Irkutsk Oblast) and 4,413 kilometres (2,742 mi) from Moscow. Ust-Tarasa is the nearest rural locality.
