= Zarb, Irkutsk Oblast =

Zarb Зарбь
- Village
- Location within Irkutsk Oblast Location within Russia
- Coordinates: 55°26′N 101°02′E
- Country: Russia
- Region: Irkutsk Oblast
- District: Bratsky District
- Time zone: UTC+8:00

Zarb (Russian: Зарбь) is a rural locality (a village) in Bratsky District, Irkutsk Oblast, Russia. Population: 224 (2010 census);

== Geography ==
This rural locality is located 87 kilometres (54 mi) from Bratsk (the district's administrative centre), 407 kilometres (253 mi) from Irkutsk (capital of Irkutsk Oblast) and 4,000 kilometres (2,500 mi) from Moscow. Tanguy is the nearest rural locality.
