= Yeleninsk =

Yeleninsk Еленинск
- Village
- Location within Irkutsk Oblast Location within Russia
- Coordinates: 53°11′N 105°25′E
- Country: Russia
- Region: Irkutsk Oblast
- District: Bayandayevsky District
- Time zone: UTC+8:00

Yeleninsk (Russian: Еленинск) is a rural locality (a village) in Bayandayevsky District, Irkutsk Oblast, Russia. Population: 77 (2010 census);

== Geography ==
This rural locality is located 16 kilometres (9.9 mi) from Bayanday (the district's administrative centre), 127 kilometres (79 mi) from Irkutsk (capital of Irkutsk Oblast) and 4,527 kilometres (2,813 mi) from Moscow. Vershininsk is the nearest rural locality.
