= Khandabay =

Khandabay Хандабай
- Village
- Location within Irkutsk Oblast Location within Russia
- Coordinates: 52°51′N 105°16′E
- Country: Russia
- Region: Irkutsk Oblast
- District: Bayandayevsky District
- Time zone: UTC+8:00

Khandabay (Russian: Хандабай) is a rural locality (a village) in Bayandayevsky District, Irkutsk Oblast, Russia. Population: 12 (2010 census);

== Geography ==
This rural locality is located 27 kilometres (17 mi) from Balagansk (the district's administrative centre), 93 kilometres (58 mi) from Irkutsk (capital of Irkutsk Oblast) and 4,553 kilometres (2,829 mi) from Moscow. Khiney is the nearest rural locality.
