= Lugovoy, Irkutsk Oblast =

Lugovoy Луговой
- Village
- Location within Irkutsk Oblast Location within Russia
- Coordinates: 55°15′N 100°29′E
- Country: Russia
- Region: Irkutsk Oblast
- District: Bratsky District
- Time zone: UTC+8:00

Lugovoy (Russian: Луговой) is a rural locality (a settlement) in Bratsky District, Irkutsk Oblast, Russia. Population: 103 (2010 census);

== Geography ==
This rural locality is located 124 kilometres (77 mi) from Bratsk (the district's administrative centre), 408 kilometres (254 mi) from Irkutsk (capital of Irkutsk Oblast) and 3,985 kilometres (2,476 mi) from Moscow. Karay is the nearest rural locality.
