= Usolye-Zhilkino =

Usolye-Zhilkino Усолье-Жилкино
- Village
- Location within Irkutsk Oblast Location within Russia
- Coordinates: 52°44′N 103°44′E
- Country: Russia
- Region: Irkutsk Oblast
- District: Bokhansky District
- Time zone: UTC+8:00

Usolye-Zhilkino (Russian: Усолье-Жилкино) is a rural locality (a selo) in Bokhansky District, Irkutsk Oblast, Russia. Population: 36 (2010 census);

== Geography ==
This rural locality is located 47 kilometres (29 mi) from Bokhan (the district's administrative centre), 61 kilometres (38 mi) from Irkutsk (capital of Irkutsk Oblast) and 4,465 kilometres (2,774 mi) from Moscow. Ugolnik is the nearest rural locality.
