= Korkhovskaya =

Korkhovskaya Корховская
- Village
- Location within Irkutsk Oblast Location within Russia
- Coordinates: 53°23′N 102°42′E
- Country: Russia
- Region: Irkutsk Oblast
- District: Alarsky District
- Time zone: UTC+8:00

Korkhovskaya (Russian: Корховская) is a rural locality (a village) in Alarsky District, Irkutsk Oblast, Russia. Population: 140 (2010 census);

== Geography ==
This rural locality is located 8 kilometres (5.0 mi) from Kutulik (the district's administrative centre), 161 kilometres (100 mi) from Irkutsk (capital of Irkutsk Oblast) and 4,325 kilometres (2,687 mi) from Moscow. Shulgina is the nearest rural locality.
