= Chilim =

Chilim Чилим
- Village
- Location within Irkutsk Oblast Location within Russia
- Coordinates: 53°06′N 104°16′E
- Country: Russia
- Region: Irkutsk Oblast
- District: Bokhansky District
- Time zone: UTC+8:00

Chilim (Russian: Чилим) is a rural locality (a village) in Bokhansky District, Irkutsk Oblast, Russia. Population: 68 (2010 census);

== Geography ==
This rural locality is located 34 kilometres (21 mi) from Bokhan (the district's administrative centre), 92 kilometres (57 mi) from Irkutsk (capital of Irkutsk Oblast) and 4,459 kilometres (2,771 mi) from Moscow. Granichnaya is the nearest rural locality.
