= Sakhorovo =

Sakhorovo Сахорово
- Village
- Location within Irkutsk Oblast Location within Russia
- Coordinates: 56°29′N 101°29′E
- Country: Russia
- Region: Irkutsk Oblast
- District: Bratsky District
- Time zone: UTC+8:00

Sakhorovo (Russian: Сахорово) is a rural locality (a settlement) in Bratsky District, Irkutsk Oblast, Russia. Population: 289 (2010 census); 314 (2002 census);

== Geography ==
This rural locality is located 40 kilometres (25 mi) from Bratsk (the district's administrative centre), 499 kilometres (310 mi) from Irkutsk (capital of Irkutsk Oblast) and 3,921 kilometres (2,436 mi) from Moscow. Anchirikova is the nearest rural locality.
