= Naratay =

Naratay Наратай
- Village
- Location within Irkutsk Oblast Location within Russia
- Coordinates: 56°07′N 102°19′E
- Country: Russia
- Region: Irkutsk Oblast
- District: Bratsky District
- Time zone: UTC+8:00

Naratay (Russian: Наратай) is a rural locality (a settlement) in Bratsky District, Irkutsk Oblast, Russia. Population: 200 (2010 census);

== Geography ==
This rural locality is located 43 kilometres (27 mi) from Bratsk (the district's administrative centre), 444 kilometres (276 mi) from Irkutsk (capital of Irkutsk Oblast) and 4,011 kilometres (2,492 mi) from Moscow. Nizhny is the nearest rural locality.
