= Bakhtay =

Bakhtay Бахтай
- Village
- Location within Irkutsk Oblast Location within Russia
- Coordinates: 53°30′N 103°06′E
- Country: Russia
- Region: Irkutsk Oblast
- District: Alarsky District
- Time zone: UTC+8:00

Bakhtay (Russian: Бахтай) is a rural locality (a selo) in Alarsky District, Irkutsk Oblast, Russia. Population: 698 (2010 census);

== Geography ==
This rural locality is located 27 kilometres (17 mi) from Kutulik (the district's administrative centre), 156 kilometres (97 mi) from Irkutsk (capital of Irkutsk Oblast) and 4,339 kilometres (2,696 mi) from Moscow. Zhlobina is the nearest rural locality.
