= Stary Khogot =

Stary Khogot Старый Хогот
- Village
- Location within Irkutsk Oblast Location within Russia
- Coordinates: 53°17′N 105°47′E
- Country: Russia
- Region: Irkutsk Oblast
- District: Bayandayevsky District
- Time zone: UTC+8:00

Stary Khogot (Russian: Старый Хогот) is a rural locality (a village) in Bayandayevsky District, Irkutsk Oblast, Russia. Population: 60 (2010 census);

== Geography ==
This rural locality is located 32 kilometres (20 mi) from Bayanday (the district's administrative centre), 150 kilometres (93 mi) from Irkutsk (capital of Irkutsk Oblast) and 4,539 kilometres (2,820 mi) from Moscow. Khotogor is the nearest rural locality.
