= Khiney =

Khiney Хиней
- Village
- Location within Irkutsk Oblast Location within Russia
- Coordinates: 52°51′N 105°17′E
- Country: Russia
- Region: Irkutsk Oblast
- District: Bayandayevsky District
- Time zone: UTC+8:00

Khiney (Russian: Хиней) is a rural locality (a village) in Bayandayevsky District, Irkutsk Oblast, Russia. Population: 50 (2010 census);

== Geography ==
This rural locality is located 26 kilometres (16 mi) from Balagansk (the district's administrative centre), 94 kilometres (58 mi) from Irkutsk (capital of Irkutsk Oblast) and 4,555 kilometres (2,830 mi) from Moscow. Khandabay is the nearest rural locality.
