= Zaslavskaya, Irkutsk Oblast =

Zaslavskaya Заславская
- Village
- Location within Irkutsk Oblast Location within Russia
- Coordinates: 54°13′N 102°57′E
- Country: Russia
- Region: Irkutsk Oblast
- District: Balagansky District
- Time zone: UTC+8:00

Zaslavskaya (Russian: Заславская) is a rural locality (a village) in Balagansky District, Irkutsk Oblast, Russia. Population: 889 (2010 census);

== Geography ==
This rural locality is located 24 kilometres (15 mi) from Balagansk (the district's administrative centre), 231 kilometres (144 mi) from Irkutsk (capital of Irkutsk Oblast) and 4,252 kilometres (2,642 mi) from Moscow. Mikhaylovshchina is the nearest rural locality.
