= Anchirikova =

Anchirikova Анчирикова
- Village
- Location within Irkutsk Oblast Location within Russia
- Coordinates: 56°28′N 101°30′E
- Country: Russia
- Region: Irkutsk Oblast
- District: Bratsky District
- Time zone: UTC+8:00

Anchirikova (Russian: Анчирикова) is a rural locality (a village) in Bratsky District, Irkutsk Oblast, Russia. Population: 10 (2010 census);

== Geography ==
This rural locality is located 36 kilometres (22 mi) from Bratsk (the district's administrative centre), 495 kilometres (308 mi) from Irkutsk (capital of Irkutsk Oblast) and 3,926 kilometres (2,440 mi) from Moscow. Sakhorovo is the nearest rural locality.
