= Khokhorsk =

Khokhorsk Хохорск
- Village
- Location within Irkutsk Oblast Location within Russia
- Coordinates: 53°09′N 103°55′E
- Country: Russia
- Region: Irkutsk Oblast
- District: Bokhansky District
- Time zone: UTC+8:00

Khokhorsk (Russian: Хохорск) is a rural locality (a selo) in Bokhansky District, Irkutsk Oblast, Russia. Population: 525 (2010 census);

== Geography ==
This rural locality is located 10 kilometres (6.2 mi) from Bokhan (the district's administrative centre), 100 kilometres (62 mi) from Irkutsk (capital of Irkutsk Oblast) and 4,430 kilometres (2,750 mi) from Moscow. Kharatirgen is the nearest rural locality.
