= Karay, Irkutsk Oblast =

Karay Карай
- Village
- Location within Irkutsk Oblast Location within Russia
- Coordinates: 55°11′N 100°31′E
- Country: Russia
- Region: Irkutsk Oblast
- District: Bratsky District
- Time zone: UTC+8:00

Karay (Russian: Карай) is a rural locality (a village) in Bratsky District, Irkutsk Oblast, Russia. Population: 64 (2010 census);

== Geography ==
This rural locality is located 128 kilometres (80 mi) from Bratsk (the district's administrative centre), 402 kilometres (250 mi) from Irkutsk (capital of Irkutsk Oblast) and 3,993 kilometres (2,481 mi) from Moscow. Kardoy is the nearest rural locality.
