= Konovalovo, Irkutsk Oblast =

Konovalovo Коновалово
- Village
- Location within Irkutsk Oblast Location within Russia
- Coordinates: 53°59′N 103°04′E
- Country: Russia
- Region: Irkutsk Oblast
- District: Balagansky District
- Time zone: UTC+8:00

Konovalovo (Russian: Коновалово) is a rural locality (a selo) in Balagansky District, Irkutsk Oblast, Russia. Population: 756 (2010 census);

== Geography ==
This rural locality is located 3 kilometres (1.9 mi) from Balagansk (the district's administrative centre), 204 kilometres (127 mi) from Irkutsk (capital of Irkutsk Oblast) and 4,284 kilometres (2,662 mi) from Moscow. Balagansk is the nearest rural locality.
