= Olonki =

Olonki Олонки
- Village
- Location within Irkutsk Oblast Location within Russia
- Coordinates: 52°54′N 103°42′E
- Country: Russia
- Region: Irkutsk Oblast
- District: Bokhansky District
- Time zone: UTC+8:00

Olonki (Russian: Олонки) is a rural locality (a selo) in Bokhansky District, Irkutsk Oblast, Russia. Population: 2,276 (2010 census);

== Geography ==
This rural locality is located 29 kilometres (18 mi) from Bokhan (the district's administrative centre), 78 kilometres (48 mi) from Irkutsk (capital of Irkutsk Oblast) and 4,444 kilometres (2,761 mi) from Moscow. Grekhnevka is the nearest rural locality.
