= Pashkova, Irkutsk Oblast =

Pashkova Пашкова
- Village
- Location within Irkutsk Oblast Location within Russia
- Coordinates: 53°11′N 103°32′E
- Country: Russia
- Region: Irkutsk Oblast
- District: Bokhansky District
- Time zone: UTC+8:00

Pashkova (Russian: Пашкова) is a rural locality (a village) in Bokhansky District, Irkutsk Oblast, Russia. Population: 16 (2010 census);

== Geography ==
This rural locality is located 16 kilometres (9.9 mi) from Bokhan (the district's administrative centre), 111 kilometres (69 mi) from Irkutsk (capital of Irkutsk Oblast) and 4,402 kilometres (2,735 mi) from Moscow. Morozova is the nearest rural locality.
