= Khotogor, Irkutsk Oblast =

Khotogor Хотогор
- Village
- Location within Irkutsk Oblast Location within Russia
- Coordinates: 53°19′N 105°51′E
- Country: Russia
- Region: Irkutsk Oblast
- District: Bayandayevsky District
- Time zone: UTC+8:00

Khotogor (Russian: Хотогор) is a rural locality (a village) in Bayandayevsky District, Irkutsk Oblast, Russia. Population: 18 (2010 census);

== Geography ==
This rural locality is located 38 kilometres (24 mi) from Balagansk (the district's administrative centre), 156 kilometres (97 mi) from Irkutsk (capital of Irkutsk Oblast) and 4,539 kilometres (2,820 mi) from Moscow. Shitkhulun is the nearest rural locality.
