= Olzony =

Olzony Ользоны
- Village
- Location within Irkutsk Oblast Location within Russia
- Coordinates: 52°56′N 105°13′E
- Country: Russia
- Region: Irkutsk Oblast
- District: Bayandayevsky District
- Time zone: UTC+8:00

Olzony (Russian: Ользоны) is a rural locality (a selo) in Bayandayevsky District, Irkutsk Oblast, Russia. Population: 662 (2010 census);

== Geography ==
This rural locality is located 23 kilometres (14 mi) from Bayanday (the district's administrative centre), 97 kilometres (60 mi) from Irkutsk (capital of Irkutsk Oblast) and 4,540 kilometres (2,820 mi) from Moscow. Maraltuy is the nearest rural locality.
