= Abramovka =

Abramovka (Russian: Абрамовка) is the name of several rural localities in Russia:

- Abramovka, Irkutsk Oblast, a village in Osinsky District of Irkutsk Oblast
- Abramovka, Jewish Autonomous Oblast, a selo in Obluchensky District of the Jewish Autonomous Oblast
- Abramovka, Moscow Oblast, a village in Ilyinskoye Rural Settlement of Orekhovo-Zuyevsky District of Moscow Oblast
- Abramovka, Novosibirsk Oblast, a village in Bolotninsky District of Novosibirsk Oblast
- Abramovka, Orenburg Oblast, a selo in Abramovsky Selsoviet of Perevolotsky District of Orenburg Oblast
- Abramovka, Perm Krai, a village in Kochyovsky District of Perm Krai
- Abramovka, Primorsky Krai, a selo in Mikhaylovsky District of Primorsky Krai
- Abramovka, Rostov Oblast, a khutor in Starostanichnoye Rural Settlement of Kamensky District of Rostov Oblast
- Abramovka, Ulyanovsk Oblast, a selo under the administrative jurisdiction of Maynsky Settlement Okrug, Maynsky District, Ulyanovsk Oblast; 54°12′04″N 47°41′34″E
- Abramovka, Vladimir Oblast, a village in Kolchuginsky District of Vladimir Oblast
- Abramovka, Abramovskoye Rural Settlement, Talovsky District, Voronezh Oblast, a settlement in Abramovskoye Rural Settlement of Talovsky District of Voronezh Oblast
- Abramovka (selo), Talovsky District, Voronezh Oblast, a rural locality
- Abramovka, Abramovskoye 2-ye Rural Settlement, Talovsky District, Voronezh Oblast, a selo in Abramovskoye 2-ye Rural Settlement of Talovsky District of Voronezh Oblast
- Abramovka, Verkhnekhavsky District, Voronezh Oblast, a village in Semenovskoye Rural Settlement of Verkhnekhavsky District of Voronezh Oblast
