= Ust-Orda Buryat constituency =

Russian legislative constituency

Ust-Orda Buryat single-member constituency
- Constituency of the Russian State Duma

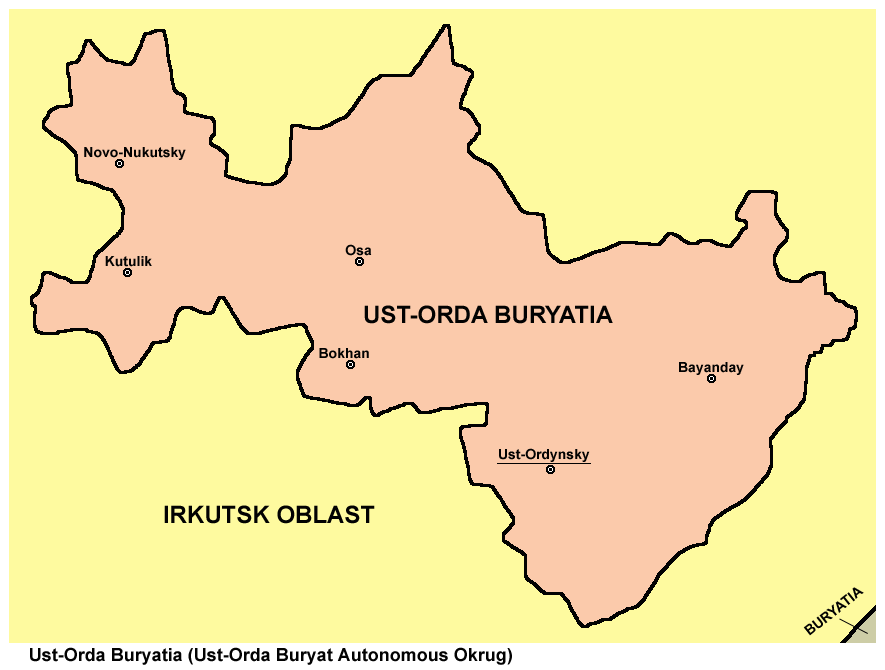
- Constituency boundaries from 1993 to 2007
- Deputy: None
- Federal subject: Ust-Orda Buryat Autonomous Okrug
- Districts: Alarsky, Bayandayevsky, Bokhansky, Ekhirit-Bulagatsky, Nukutsky, Osinsky
- Voters: 75,330 (2006)

The Ust-Orda Buryat constituency (No.220) was a Russian legislative constituency in the Ust-Orda Buryat Autonomous Okrug in 1993–2007. It encompassed the entire territory of Ust-Orda Buryat Autonomous Okrug. The seat was last occupied by United Russia deputy Valery Maleyev, former Governor of Ust-Orda Buryat Autonomous Okrug, who won a by-election in 2006.

The constituency was dissolved in 2007 when State Duma adopted full proportional representation for the next two electoral cycles. In 2008, Ust-Orda Buryat Autonomous Okrug was merged with Irkutsk Oblast. Currently the territory of the former Ust-Orda constituency is split between Irkutsk and Angarsk constituencies.

== Boundaries ==
1993–2007: Alarsky District, Bayandayevsky District, Bokhansky District, Ekhirit-Bulagatsky District, Nukutsky District, Osinsky District, Ust-Ordynsky
The constituency had been covering the entirety of Ust-Orda Buryat Autonomous Okrug since its initial creation in 1993.

== Members elected ==
Election	Member	Party
1993	Sergey Boskholov	Independent
1995	Sergey Boskholov	Our Home – Russia
1999	Valery Kuzin (Note: died in April 2006)	Independent
2003	Valery Kuzin	Independent
2006	Valery Maleyev	United Russia

== Election results ==
=== 1993 ===
==== Declared candidates ====
- Sergey Boskholov (Independent), former Member of the Committee for Constitutional Supervision of the Soviet Union (1990–1991)
- Apollon Ivanov (Independent), farm director

==== Results ====
Summary of the 12 December 1993 Russian legislative election in the Ust-Orda Buryat constituency
Candidate	Party	Votes	%
Sergey Boskholov	Independent	40,644	70.96%
Apollon Ivanov	Independent	–	17.18%
Total		57,280	100%

=== 1995 ===
==== Declared candidates ====
- Sergey Boskholov (NDR), incumbent Member of State Duma (1994–present)
- Valery Maleyev (Independent), Member of Duma of the Ust-Orda Buryat Autonomous Okrug (1994–present), sovkhoz director
- Aleksandr Nechukhayev (Independent), Head of Nukutsky District Department of Agriculture
- Sergey Semenov (LDPR), State Duma staffer

==== Results ====
Summary of the 17 December 1995 Russian legislative election in the Ust-Orda Buryat constituency
Candidate	Party	Votes	%
Sergey Boskholov (incumbent)	Our Home – Russia	24,955	43.05%
Valery Maleyev	Independent	17,869	30.83%
Aleksandr Nechukhayev	Independent	8,964	15.47%
Sergey Semenov	Liberal Democratic Party	2,016	3.48%
against all		3,227	5.57%
Total		57,962	100%

=== 1999 ===
==== Declared candidates ====
- Yevgeny Bardakhanov (Independent), Member of Duma of the Ust-Orda Buryat Autonomous Okrug (1996–present), surgeon
- Maksim Batorov (Independent), economist
- Oleg Batorov (Independent), Deputy Governor of Ust-Orda Buryat Autonomous Okrug – Permanent Representative to the Government of Russia (1991–present), former People's Deputy of the Soviet Union (1989–1991)
- Sergey Boskholov (NDR), incumbent Member of State Duma (1994–present)
- Ivan Ivanov (CPRF), Deputy Chairman of the Duma of the Ust-Orda Buryat Autonomous Okrug (1996–present), 1996 gubernatorial candidate
- Valery Kuzin (Independent), rector of Russian State Academy of Physical Culture (1993–present)
- Igor Shpakov (Independent), agriculture businessman
- Vladimir Tarasov (Nikolayev–Fyodorov Bloc), Ministry of Labour and Social Development of Russia official

==== Failed to qualify ====
- Igor Cherny (Independent)
- Aleksandr Novopashin (LDPR)
- Aleksandr Zayakhayev (Independent)

==== Did not file ====
- Gennady Istomin (Independent), Deputy Chairman of the Legislative Assembly of Irkutsk Oblast (1994–present)

==== Results ====
Summary of the 19 December 1999 Russian legislative election in the Ust-Orda Buryat constituency
Candidate	Party	Votes	%
Valery Kuzin	Independent	28,357	49.08%
Sergey Boskholov (incumbent)	Our Home – Russia	14,355	24.85%
Ivan Ivanov	Communist Party	5,059	8.76%
Yevgeny Bardakhanov	Independent	2,660	4.60%
Igor Shpakov	Independent	2,264	3.92%
Vladimir Tarasov	Andrey Nikolayev and Svyatoslav Fyodorov Bloc	763	1.32%
Oleg Batorov	Independent	757	1.31%
Maksim Batorov	Independent	315	0.55%
against all		2,264	3.92%
Total		57,775	100%

=== 2003 ===
==== Declared candidates ====
- Sergey Boskholov (Independent), Deputy Governor of Irkutsk Oblast (2000–present), former Member of State Duma (1994–1999)
- Nikolay Kizimov (NPPR), retired Russian Army podpolkovnik
- Valery Kuzin (Independent), incumbent Member of State Duma (2000–present)
- Yevgeny Mityukov (Independent), aide to State Duma member Vladimir Zhirinovsky
- Aleksandr Stashin (Independent), pensioner
- Dmitry Tabikhanov (PVR-RPZh), former Deputy Governor of Ust-Orda Buryat Autonomous Okrug – Chairman of the Committee for the Management of State Property (1990–1994)
- Aleksandr Terentyev (Independent), businessman
- Vladimir Zverev (United Russia), Chief of Ust-Orda Buryat Autonomous Okrug Militsiya (1998–present)

==== Withdrawn candidates ====
- Vasily Berdnikov (APR), former Member of Supreme Soviet of the Russian SFSR (1971–1975), agriculture executive
- Tatyana Yasnikova (Independent), writer, poet

==== Did not file ====
- Viktor Barlukov (Independent), justice of the peace
- Afanasy Boldyrev (Independent), orphanage director
- Vladimir Serikov (Independent), unemployed

==== Results ====
Summary of the 7 December 2003 Russian legislative election in the Ust-Orda Buryat constituency
Candidate	Party	Votes	%
Valery Kuzin (incumbent)	Independent	27,427	46.40%
Aleksandr Terentyev	Independent	13,519	22.87%
Sergey Boskholov	Independent	10,746	18.18%
Vladimir Zverev	United Russia	2,971	5.03%
Yevgeny Mityukov	Independent	687	1.16%
Nikolay Kizimov	People's Patriotic Party	637	1.08%
Dmitry Tabikhanov	Party of Russia's Rebirth-Russian Party of Life	435	0.74%
Aleksandr Stashin	Independent	115	0.19%
against all		1,547	2.62%
Total		59,118	100%

=== 2006 ===
==== Declared candidates ====
- Ivan Khriyenko (Independent), businessman
- Valery Maleyev (United Russia), Governor of Ust-Orda Buryat Autonomous Okrug (1996–present), 1995 candidate for this seat

==== Withdrawn candidates ====
- Sergey Seredkin (Independent), Member of Duma of Bokhansky District (2004–present), agriculture businessman

==== Failed to qualify ====
- Igor Bobkov (LDPR), Member of People's Khural of the Republic of Buryatia (2002–present), gas businessman

==== Results ====
Summary of the 8 October 2006 by-election in the Ust-Orda Buryat constituency
Candidate	Party	Votes	%
Valery Maleyev	United Russia	33,882	83.23%
Ivan Khriyenko	Independent	2,779	6.82%
against all		3,350	8.22%
Total		40,708	100%
