= Ust-Orda Buryat Autonomous Okrug =

Former federal subject of Russia

Ust-Orda Buryat Autonomous Okrug Усть-Ордынский Бурятский автономный округ (Russian) Усть-Ордын (Усть-Ордагай) Буряадай автономито тойрог (Buryat)
- Autonomous okrug of Russia
- Flag Coat of arms

- Capital: Ust-Ordynsky
- Area
  - 2010: 22,138.1 km^{2} (8,547.6 sq mi)
- Population
  - 2010: 125,177
- Government
  - Type: Federated state
- Head of administration
  - 1991–96: Aleksey Batagayev
  - 1996–2007: Valery Maleyev
  - 2007: Alexander Tishanin
- Legislature: Duma
- History
  - Established: 26 September 1937
  - Disestablished: 1 January 2008
- Contained within
  - Federal district: Siberian
  - Economic region: East Siberian
- Political subdivisions: 6 districts
Preceded by	Succeeded by
Buryat-Mongol ASSR	Ust-Orda Buryat Okrug
- Today part of: Irkutsk Oblast

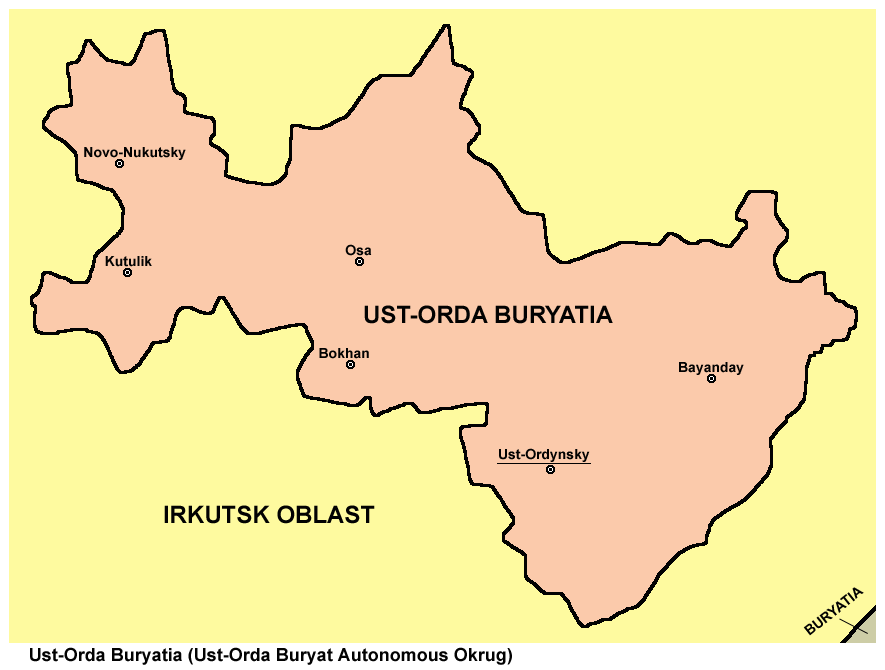
Map of the Ust-Orda Buryat Autonomous Okrug

Ust-Orda Buryat Autonomous Okrug (Note: Russian: Усть-Ордынский Бурятский автономный округ (УОБАО); Buryat: Усть-Ордын (Усть-Ордагай) Буряадай автономито тойрог) was an autonomous okrug of Russia within Irkutsk Oblast. After a 16 April 2006 referendum, in which almost 90% of participants voted for unification with Irkutsk Oblast, the autonomous okrug was merged into the oblast on 1 January 2008. The territory has since been administrated as the Ust-Orda Buryat Okrug of Irkutsk Oblast.

== History ==
=== Russian Federation ===
From 1993, the autonomous okrug was both an independent federal subject of Russia and a part of Irkutsk Oblast until it was officially merged with Irkutsk Oblast on January 1, 2008.

=== Merger ===
In a referendum held on April 16, 2006, the majority of residents in Irkutsk Oblast and Ust-Orda Buryat Autonomous Okrug agreed to the unification of the two regions. According to regions' electoral commissions, 68.98% of residents of Irkutsk Oblast and 99.51% of residents in Ust-Orda Buryatia took part in the vote, making it one of the best attended plebiscites in the country since the 2003 Russian election. The merger was approved by an absolute majority of the electorate: by 89.77% in Irkutsk Oblast and by 97.79% in Ust-Orda Buryatia. The enlarged Irkutsk Oblast officially came into existence on January 1, 2008.

== Administrative Divisions ==
The okrug is divided into six administrative districts:

- Alarsky District
- Bayandayevsky District
- Bokhansky District
- Ekhirit-Bulagatsky District
- Nukutsky District
- Osinsky District

== Governors ==
No.	Portrait	Name (lifespan)	Tenure	Time in office	Election
1		Aleksey Batagayev (1950–2002)	26 December 1991 – 15 December 1996 (lost election)	4 years, 355 days	Appointed
2		Valery Maleyev (born 1964)	15 December 1996 – 26 January 2007 (resigned)	10 years, 42 days	1996; 2000; 2004
–		Alexander Tishanin (born 1966)	26 January 2007 – 31 December 2007 (autonomy dissolved)	339 days	Acting

== See also ==
- Buryatia
- Agin-Buryat Autonomous Okrug
- Flag of Ust-Orda Buryat Okrug

== Source ==
- "Official website" (in Russian). Archived from the original on 12 October 2007.
