= Posyolok 2-go uchastka instituta imeni Dokuchayeva =

Posyolok 2-go uchastka instituta imeni Dokuchayeva Посёлок 2-го участка института имени Докучаева
- Settlement
- Location within Voronezh Oblast Location within Russia
- Coordinates: 51°02′N 40°44′E
- Country: Russia
- Region: Voronezh Oblast
- District: Talovsky District
- Time zone: UTC+3:00

Posyolok 2-go uchastka instituta imeni Dokuchayeva (Russian: Посёлок 2-го участка института имени Докучаева) is a rural locality (a settlement) and the administrative center of Kamenno-Stepnoye Rural Settlement, Talovsky District, Voronezh Oblast, Russia. The population was 264 as of 2010. There are 19 streets.

== Geography ==
It is located 12 km south of Talovaya (the district's administrative centre) by road. Posyolok 3-go uchastka instituta imeni Dokuchayeva is the nearest rural locality.
