= Orlovka, Talovsky District, Voronezh Oblast =

Orlovka Орловка
- Selo
- Location within Voronezh Oblast Location within Russia
- Coordinates: 51°02′N 40°32′E
- Country: Russia
- Region: Voronezh Oblast
- District: Talovsky District
- Time zone: UTC+3:00

Orlovka (Russian: Орловка) is a rural locality (a selo) and the administrative center of Orlovskoye Rural Settlement, Talovsky District, Voronezh Oblast, Russia. The population was 996 as of 2010. There are 3 streets.

== Geography ==
Orlovka is located on the Chigla River, 20 km southwest of Talovaya (the district's administrative centre) by road. Ozerki is the nearest rural locality.
