= Zarechnoye, Alarsky District =

Zarechnoye Заречное
- Village
- Location within Irkutsk Oblast Location within Russia
- Coordinates: 53°10′N 102°38′E
- Country: Russia
- Region: Irkutsk Oblast
- District: Alarsky District
- Time zone: UTC+8:00

Zarechnoye (Russian: Заречное) is a rural locality (a village) in Alarsky District, Irkutsk Oblast, Russia. Population: 234 (2010 census);

== Geography ==
This rural locality is located 22 kilometres (14 mi) from Kutulik (the district's administrative centre), 147 kilometres (91 mi) from Irkutsk (capital of Irkutsk Oblast) and 4,343 kilometres (2,699 mi) from Moscow. Ideal is the nearest rural locality.
