= Porokhovo, Voronezh Oblast =

Porokhovo Порохово
- Settlement
- Location within Voronezh Oblast Location within Russia
- Coordinates: 50°57′N 40°46′E
- Country: Russia
- Region: Voronezh Oblast
- District: Talovsky District
- Time zone: UTC+3:00

Porokhovo (Russian: Порохово) is a rural locality (a settlement) in Nizhnekamenskoye Rural Settlement, Talovsky District, Voronezh Oblast, Russia. The population was 209 as of 2010. There are 3 streets.

== Geography ==
Porokhovo is located 23 km south of Talovaya (the district's administrative centre) by road. Terekhovo is the nearest rural locality.
