= Solontsovka =

Solontsovka Солонцовка
- Settlement
- Location within Voronezh Oblast Location within Russia
- Coordinates: 51°07′N 41°02′E
- Country: Russia
- Region: Voronezh Oblast
- District: Talovsky District
- Time zone: UTC+3:00

Solontsovka (Russian: Солонцовка) is a rural locality (a settlement) in Abramovskoye Rural Settlement, Talovsky District, Voronezh Oblast, Russia. The population was 214 as of 2010. There are seven streets.

== Geography ==
Solontsovka is located 39 km east of Talovaya (the district's administrative centre) by road. Ternovsky is the nearest rural locality.
