= Novogolsky 2-y =

Novogolsky 2-y Новогольский 2-й
- Settlement
- Location within Voronezh Oblast Location within Russia
- Coordinates: 51°16′N 41°04′E
- Country: Russia
- Region: Voronezh Oblast
- District: Talovsky District
- Time zone: UTC+3:00

Novogolsky 2-y (Russian: Новогольский 2-й) is a rural locality (a settlement) in Sinyavskoye Rural Settlement, Talovsky District, Voronezh Oblast, Russia. The population was 133 as of 2010.

== Geography ==
Novogolsky 2-y is located 39 km northeast of Talovaya (the district's administrative centre) by road. Abramovka is the nearest rural locality.
