= Uspensky, Voronezh Oblast =

Uspensky Успенский
- Settlement
- Location within Voronezh Oblast Location within Russia
- Coordinates: 51°10′N 40°40′E
- Country: Russia
- Region: Voronezh Oblast
- District: Talovsky District
- Time zone: UTC+3:00

Uspensky (Russian: Успенский) is a rural locality (a settlement) in Alexandrovskoye Rural Settlement, Talovsky District, Voronezh Oblast, Russia. The population was 160 as of 2010. There are 3 streets.

== Geography ==
Uspensky is located 13 km northwest of Talovaya (the district's administrative centre) by road. Novotroitsky is the nearest rural locality.
