= Novitchenko =

Novitchenko Новитченко
- Selo
- Location within Voronezh Oblast Location within Russia
- Coordinates: 51°11′N 41°06′E
- Country: Russia
- Region: Voronezh Oblast
- District: Talovsky District
- Time zone: UTC+3:00

Novitchenko (Russian: Новитченко) is a rural locality (a selo) in Abramovskoye Rural Settlement, Talovsky District, Voronezh Oblast, Russia. The population was 106 as of 2010. There are 5 streets.

== Geography ==
Novitchenko is located 34 km northeast of Talovaya (the district's administrative centre) by road. Yelan-Kolenovsky is the nearest rural locality.
