= Zarechensky =

Zarechensky Зареченский
- Settlement
- Location within Voronezh Oblast Location within Russia
- Coordinates: 51°07′N 40°41′E
- Country: Russia
- Region: Voronezh Oblast
- District: Talovsky District
- Time zone: UTC+3:00

Zarechensky (Russian: Зареченский) is a rural locality (a settlement) in Alexandrovskoye Rural Settlement, Talovsky District, Voronezh Oblast, Russia. The population was 92 as of 2010.

== Geography ==
Zarechensky is located on the right bank of the Sukhaya Chigla River, 12 km northeast of Talovaya (the district's administrative centre) by road. Novotroitsky is the nearest rural locality.
