= Novogradsky =

Novogradsky Новоградский
- Settlement
- Location within Voronezh Oblast Location within Russia
- Coordinates: 51°07′N 40°57′E
- Country: Russia
- Region: Voronezh Oblast
- District: Talovsky District
- Time zone: UTC+3:00

Novogradsky (Russian: Новоградский) is a rural locality (a settlement) and the administrative center of Voznesenskoye Rural Settlement, Talovsky District, Voronezh Oblast, Russia. The population was 103 as of 2010.

== Geography ==
Novogradsky is located 32 km east of Talovaya (the district's administrative centre) by road. Abramovka is the nearest rural locality.
