= Vyazovka, Voronezh Oblast =

Vyazovka Вязовка
- Selo
- Location within Voronezh Oblast Location within Russia
- Coordinates: 51°19′N 41°01′E
- Country: Russia
- Region: Voronezh Oblast
- District: Talovsky District
- Time zone: UTC+3:00

Vyazovka (Russian: Вязовка) is a rural locality (a selo) in Sinyavskoye Rural Settlement, Talovsky District, Voronezh Oblast, Russia. The population was 469 as of 2010. There are 4 streets.

== Geography ==
Vyazovka is located 39 km northeast of Talovaya (the district's administrative centre) by road. Babinka is the nearest rural locality.
