= Kazanka, Voronezh Oblast =

Kazanka Казанка
- Settlement
- Location within Voronezh Oblast Location within Russia
- Coordinates: 51°14′N 40°47′E
- Country: Russia
- Region: Voronezh Oblast
- District: Talovsky District
- Time zone: UTC+3:00

Kazanka (Russian: Казанка) is a rural locality (a settlement) in Alexandrovskoye Rural Settlement, Talovsky District, Voronezh Oblast, Russia. The population was 410 as of 2010. There are 6 streets.

== Geography ==
Kazanka is located 23 km northeast of Talovaya (the district's administrative centre) by road. Krasny is the nearest rural locality.
