= Veryovkin 1-y =

Veryovkin 1-y Верёвкин 1-й
- Settlement
- Location within Voronezh Oblast Location within Russia
- Coordinates: 51°06′N 40°45′E
- Country: Russia
- Region: Voronezh Oblast
- District: Talovsky District
- Time zone: UTC+3:00

Veryovkin 1-y (Russian: Верёвкин 1-й) is a rural locality (a settlement) in Nizhnekamenskoye Rural Settlement, Talovsky District, Voronezh Oblast, Russia. The population was 99 as of 2010.

== Geography ==
Veryovkin 1-y is located 5 km east of Talovaya (the district's administrative centre) by road. Talovaya is the nearest rural locality.
