= Verkhneozyorsky =

Verkhneozyorsky Верхнеозёрский
- Settlement
- Location within Voronezh Oblast Location within Russia
- Coordinates: 51°02′N 40°41′E
- Country: Russia
- Region: Voronezh Oblast
- District: Talovsky District
- Time zone: UTC+3:00

Verkhneozyorsky (Russian: Верхнеозёрский) is a rural locality (a settlement) in Kamenno-Stepnoye Rural Settlement, Talovsky District, Voronezh Oblast, Russia. The population was 440 as of 2010. There are 6 streets.

== Geography ==
Verkhneozyorsky is located 9 km south of Talovaya (the district's administrative centre) by road. Vysoky is the nearest rural locality.
