= Uchastok No. 26 =

Uchastok №26 Участок № 26
- Settlement
- Location within Voronezh Oblast Location within Russia
- Coordinates: 51°12′N 40°53′E
- Country: Russia
- Region: Voronezh Oblast
- District: Talovsky District
- Time zone: UTC+3:00

Uchastok №26 (Russian: Участок № 26) is a rural locality (a settlement) and the administrative center of Shaninskoye Rural Settlement, Talovsky District, Voronezh Oblast, Russia. The population was 216 as of 2010. There are 15 streets.

== Geography ==
Uchastok №26 is located 21 km northeast of Talovaya (the district's administrative centre) by road. Uchastok #4 is the nearest rural locality.
