= Voznesenovka, Talovsky District, Voronezh Oblast =

Voznesenovka Вознесеновка
- Settlement
- Location within Voronezh Oblast Location within Russia
- Coordinates: 51°07′N 40°33′E
- Country: Russia
- Region: Voronezh Oblast
- District: Talovsky District
- Time zone: UTC+3:00

Voznesenovka (Russian: Вознесеновка) is a rural locality (a settlement) in Novochigolskoye Rural Settlement, Talovsky District, Voronezh Oblast, Russia. The population was 183 as of 2010. There are 4 streets.

== Geography ==
Voznesenovka is located 14 km west of Talovaya (the district's administrative centre) by road. Pokrovsky is the nearest rural locality.
