= Nizhnyaya Kamenka =

Nizhnyaya Kamenka Нижняя Каменка
- Settlement
- Location within Voronezh Oblast Location within Russia
- Coordinates: 51°07′N 40°49′E
- Country: Russia
- Region: Voronezh Oblast
- District: Talovsky District
- Time zone: UTC+3:00

Nizhnyaya Kamenka (Russian: Нижняя Каменка) is a rural locality (a settlement) in Nizhnekamenskoye Rural Settlement, Talovsky District, Voronezh Oblast, Russia. The population was 462 as of 2010. There are 4 streets.

== Geography ==
Nizhnyaya Kamenka is located 10 km east of Talovaya (the district's administrative centre) by road. Uchastok №4 is the nearest rural locality.
