= Khleborob =

Khleborob Хлебороб
- Settlement
- Location within Voronezh Oblast Location within Russia
- Coordinates: 51°14′N 41°09′E
- Country: Russia
- Region: Voronezh Oblast
- District: Talovsky District
- Time zone: UTC+3:00

Khleborob (Russian: Хлебороб) is a rural locality (a settlement) in Abramovskoye Rural Settlement, Talovsky District, Voronezh Oblast, Russia. The population was 72 as of 2010.

== Geography ==
Khleborob is located 40 km northeast of Talovaya (the district's administrative centre) by road. Abramovka is the nearest rural locality.
