= Osinki, Talovsky District, Voronezh Oblast =

Osinki Осинки
- Settlement
- Location within Voronezh Oblast Location within Russia
- Coordinates: 51°09′N 41°04′E
- Country: Russia
- Region: Voronezh Oblast
- District: Talovsky District
- Time zone: UTC+3:00

Osinki (Russian: Осинки) is a rural locality (a settlement) in Abramovskoye Rural Settlement, Talovsky District, Voronezh Oblast, Russia. The population was 179 as of 2010. There are 3 streets.

== Geography ==
Osinki is located 32 km northeast of Talovaya (the district's administrative centre) by road. Abramovka is the nearest rural locality.
