= Novy mir, Voronezh Oblast =

Novy mir Новый Мир
- Settlement
- Location within Voronezh Oblast Location within Russia
- Coordinates: 51°11′N 40°44′E
- Country: Russia
- Region: Voronezh Oblast
- District: Talovsky District
- Time zone: UTC+3:00

Novy mir (Russian: Новый Мир) is a rural locality (a settlement) in Alexandrovskoye Rural Settlement, Talovsky District, Voronezh Oblast, Russia. The population was 65 as of 2010.

== Geography ==
Novy mir is located 14 km north of Talovaya (the district's administrative centre) by road. Sergiyevsky is the nearest rural locality.
