= Novonikolsky, Talovsky District, Voronezh Oblast =

Novonikolsky Новоникольский
- Settlement
- Location within Voronezh Oblast Location within Russia
- Coordinates: 51°07′N 40°34′E
- Country: Russia
- Region: Voronezh Oblast
- District: Talovsky District
- Time zone: UTC+3:00

Novonikolsky (Russian: Новоникольский) is a rural locality (a settlement) in Novochigolskoye Rural Settlement, Talovsky District, Voronezh Oblast, Russia. The population was 109 as of 2010. There are 3 streets.

== Geography ==
Novonikolsky is located 14 km west of Talovaya (the district's administrative centre) by road. Vasilyevsky is the nearest rural locality.
