= Terekhovo, Voronezh Oblast =

Terekhovo Терехово
- Settlement
- Location within Voronezh Oblast Location within Russia
- Coordinates: 50°58′N 40°46′E
- Country: Russia
- Region: Voronezh Oblast
- District: Talovsky District
- Time zone: UTC+3:00

Terekhovo (Russian: Терехово) is a rural locality (a settlement) in Nizhnekamenskoye Rural Settlement, Talovsky District, Voronezh Oblast, Russia. The population was 348 inf 2010. There are three streets.

== Geography ==
Terekhovo is located 22 kilometres (14 mi) south of Talovaya (the district's administrative centre) by road. Porokhovo is the nearest rural locality.
