= Uchastok No. 12 =

Uchastok №12 Участок № 12
- Settlement
- Location within Voronezh Oblast Location within Russia
- Coordinates: 51°11′N 40°48′E
- Country: Russia
- Region: Voronezh Oblast
- District: Talovsky District
- Time zone: UTC+3:00

Uchastok №12 (Russian: Участок № 12) is a rural locality (a settlement) in Shaninskoye Rural Settlement, Talovsky District, Voronezh Oblast, Russia. The population was 216 as of 2010. There are 2 streets. No cap.

== Geography ==
Uchastok №12 is located 14 km northeast of Talovaya (the district's administrative centre) by road.
