= Komintern, Voronezh Oblast =

Komintern Коминтерн
- Settlement
- Location within Voronezh Oblast Location within Russia
- Coordinates: 51°07′N 40°38′E
- Country: Russia
- Region: Voronezh Oblast
- District: Talovsky District
- Time zone: UTC+3:00

Komintern (Russian: Коминтерн) is a rural locality (a settlement) in Alexandrovskoye Rural Settlement, Talovsky District, Voronezh Oblast, Russia. The population was 162 as of 2010. There are 3 streets.

== Geography ==
Komintern is located 8 km west of Talovaya (the district's administrative centre) by road. Vasilyevsky is the nearest rural locality.
