= Abramovka, Abramovskoye Rural Settlement, Talovsky District, Voronezh Oblast =

Abramovka Абрамовка
- Settlement
- Location within Voronezh Oblast Location within Russia
- Coordinates: 51°11′N 41°00′E
- Country: Russia
- Region: Voronezh Oblast
- District: Talovsky District
- Time zone: UTC+3:00

Abramovka (Russian: Абрамовка) is a rural locality (a settlement) and the administrative center of Abramovskoye Rural Settlement of Talovsky District, Voronezh Oblast, Russia. The population was 3363 as of 2010. There are 30 streets.

== Geography ==
The settlement is located in the Don basin in the interfluve of Bitiuga and Khopra, 26 km northeast of Talovaya (the district's administrative centre) by road. Vidny is the nearest rural locality.

== Ethnicity ==
The settlement is inhabited by Russians.
