= Abramovka, Irkutsk Oblast =

Abramovka Абрамовка
- Village
- Location within Irkutsk Oblast Location within Russia
- Coordinates: 53°23′N 103°46′E
- Country: Russia
- Region: Irkutsk Oblast
- District: Osinsky District
- Time zone: UTC+8:00

Abramovka (Russian: Абрамовка) is a rural locality (a village) in Osinsky District, Irkutsk Oblast, Russia. The population was 247 as of 2012.

== Geography ==
Abramovka is located nine km west of Osa (the district's administrative centre) by road. Maysk is the nearest rural locality.
