= Autonomous okrugs of Russia =

Type of federal subject of Russia

Autonomous okrug
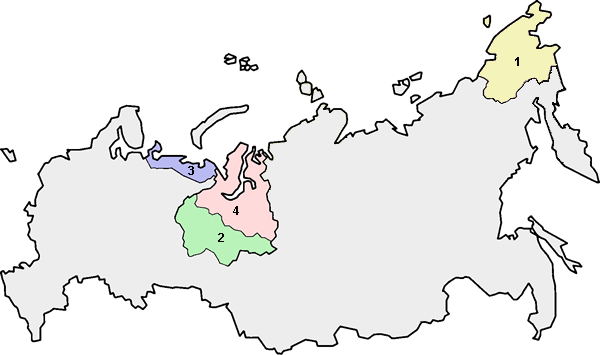
1. Chukotka Autonomous Okrug
2. Khanty-Mansi Autonomous Okrug
3. Nenets Autonomous Okrug
4. Yamalo-Nenets Autonomous Okrug
- Category: Federated state
- Location: Russian Federation
- Number: 4
- Populations: 42,090 (Nenets Autonomous Okrug) – 1,532,243 (Khanty-Mansi Autonomous Okrug)
- Areas: 177,000 km^{2} (68,200 sq mi) (Nenets Autonomous Okrug) - 750,000 km^{2} (289,700 sq mi) (Yamalo-Nenets Autonomous Okrug)
- Government: Okrug government
- Subdivisions: administrative: districts, cities and towns of okrug significance, towns of district significance, urban-type settlements of district significance, selsoviets; municipal: urban okrugs, municipal districts, urban settlements, rural settlements

Autonomous okrugs, (Russian: автономный округ, romanized: avtonomnyy okrug) which are also referred to as "autonomous districts" or "autonomous areas" are a type of federal subject of the Russian Federation and simultaneously an administrative division type of some federal subjects. As of 2024, Russia has four autonomous okrugs of its 83 federal subjects. (Note: If including the Russian-occupied territories of Ukraine, it would be 89 federal subjects.) The Chukotka Autonomous Okrug is the only okrug which is not subordinate to an oblast. The Nenets Autonomous Okrug is a part of Arkhangelsk Oblast, the Khanty-Mansi Autonomous Okrug and the Yamalo-Nenets Autonomous Okrug are parts of Tyumen Oblast.

== History ==
Originally called national okrug, this type of administrative unit was created in the 1920s and widely implemented in the 1930s to provide autonomy to Indigenous peoples of the North, like the Karelian National Okrug for the Tver Karelians. The 1977 Soviet Constitution changed the term "national okrugs" to "autonomous okrugs" in order to emphasize that they were indeed autonomies and not simply another type of administrative and territorial division. While the 1977 Constitution stipulated that the autonomous okrugs were subordinated to the oblasts and krais, this clause was revised on December 15, 1990, when it was specified that autonomous okrugs were subordinated directly to the Russian SFSR, although they still could stay in the jurisdiction of a krai or an oblast to which they were subordinated before.

According to the Constitution of the Soviet Union, in case of a union republic voting on leaving the Soviet Union, autonomous republics, autonomous oblasts, and autonomous okrugs had the right, by means of a referendum, to independently resolve whether they will stay in the USSR or leave with the seceding union republic, as well as to raise the issue of their state-legal status.

== List of autonomous okrugs ==
| Flag | Map | Name | Domestic names | Capital | Population (2010) | Area | Formation |
|---|---|---|---|---|---|---|---|
| Flag of Chukotka | Map showing Chukotka in Russia | Chukotka Autonomous Okrug | Russian: Чукотский автономный округ (Chukotskiy avtonomny okrug); Chukot: Чукоткакэн автономныкэн округ (Chukotkaken avtonomnyken okrug) | Anadyr; Russian: Анадырь (Anadyr); Chukot: Кагыргын (Kagyrgyn) | 50,526 | 721,481 km^{2} (278,565 sq mi) | 1930-12-10 |
| Flag of Yugra | Map showing Yugra in Russia | Khanty-Mansi Autonomous Okrug | Russian: Ханты-Мансийский автономный округ (Khanty-Mansiyskiy avtonomny okrug); Khanty: Хӑнты-Мансийской автономной округ (Ȟănty-Mansijskoj avtonomnoj okrug); Mansi: Ханты-Мансийский автономный округ (Hanty-Mansijskij avtonomnyj okrug) | Khanty-Mansiysk; Russian: Ханты-Мансийск (Khanty-Mansiysk); Khanty: Ёмвоҷ (Yomvoḉ); Mansi: Абга (Abga) | 1,532,243 | 534,801 km^{2} (206,488 sq mi) | 1930-12-10 |
| Flag of Nenetsia | Map showing Nenetsia in Russia | Nenets Autonomous Okrug | Russian: Ненецкий автономный округ (Nenetskiy avtonomny okrug); Nenets: Ненёцие автономной ӈокрук (Nenjocije awtonomnoj ŋokruk) | Naryan-Mar; Russian: Нарьян-Мар (Naryan-Mar); Nenets: Няръянa марˮ (Nyar'yana marq) | 42,090 | 176,810 km^{2} (68,267 sq mi) | 1929-07-15 |
| Flag of Yamalo-Nenetsia | Map showing Yamalo-Nenetsia in Russia | Yamalo-Nenets Autonomous Okrug | Russian: Ямало-Ненецкий автономный округ (Yamalo-Nenetskiy avtonomny okrug); Nenets: Ямалы-Ненёцие автономной ӈокрук (Yamaly-Nenyotsiye avtonomnoj ŋokruk) | Salekhard; Russian: Салехард (Salekhard); Nenets: Саляʼ Xарад (Salja’ Harad) | 522,904 | 769,250 km^{2} (297,009 sq mi) | 1930-12-10 |

=== Former autonomous okrugs ===
| Flag | Map | Name | Domestic names | Capital | Population | Area | Years |
|---|---|---|---|---|---|---|---|
| Flag of Agin-Buryatia | Map showing Agin-Buryatia in Russia | Agin-Buryat Autonomous Okrug | Russian: Агинский Бурятский автономный округ (Aginskiy Buryatskiy avtonomny okrug); Buryat: Агын Буряадай автономито тойрог (Agyn Buryaaday avtonomito toyrog) | Aginskoye; Russian: Агинское (Aginskoye); Buryat: Ага (Aga) | 76,383 (2008) | 19,592 km^{2} (7,565 sq mi) | 1937–2008 |
| Flag of Evenkia | Map showing Evenkia in Russia | Evenk Autonomous Okrug | Russian: Эвенкийский автономный округ (Evenkiyskiy avtonomny okrug); Evenki: Эведы автомоды округ (Ēvēde avtōmōde okrug) | Tura; Russian: Тура (Tura); Evenki: Typy (Turu) | 16,979 (2007) | 763,197 km^{2} (294,672 sq mi) | 1930–2007 |
| Flag of Komi-Permyakia | Map showing Komi-Permyakia in Russia | Komi-Permyak Autonomous Okrug | Russian: Коми-Пермяцкий автономный округ (Komi-Permyatskiy avtonomny okrug); Komi-Permyak: Коми-Пермяцкöй Aвтономнöй Округ (Komi-Permjacköj avtonomnöj okrug) | Kudymkar; Russian: Кудымкар (Kudymkar); Komi-Permyak: Кудымкöр (Kudymkör) | 132,824 (2005) | 32,770 km^{2} (12,653 sq mi) | 1930–2005 |
| Flag of Koryakia | Map showing Koryakia in Russia | Koryak Autonomous Okrug | Russian: Корякский автономный округ (Koryakskiy avtonomny okrug); Koryak: Чав’чываокруг (Čav’čyvaokrug) | Palana; Russian: Палана (Palana); Koryak: Пылылъын (Pylylʺyn) | 22,580 (2007) | 292,600 km^{2} (112,973 sq mi) | 1930–2007 |
| Flag of Taymyria | Map showing Taymyria in Russia | Taymyr Dolgano-Nenets Autonomous Okrug | Russian: Таймырский (Долгано-Ненецкий) автономный округ (Taymyrskiy (Dolgano-Nenetskiy) avtonomny okrug) | Dudinka; Russian: Дудинка (Dudinka) | 38,372 (2007) | 879,929 km^{2} (339,742 sq mi) | 1930–2007 |
| Flag of Ust-Orda Buryatia | Map showing Ust-Orda Buryatia in Russia | Ust-Orda Buryat Autonomous Okrug | Russian: Усть-Ордынский Бурятский автономный округ (Ust’-Ordynskiy Buryatskiy avtonomny okrug); Buryat: Усть-Ордын Буряадай автономито тойрог (Ust’-Ordyn Buryaaday avtonomito toyrog) | Ust-Ordynsky; Russian: Усть-Ордынский (Ust-Ordynsky); Buryat: Ордын Адаг (Ordyn Adag) | 134,320 (2008) | 22,400 km^{2} (8,649 sq mi) | 1937–2008 |

== Recent developments ==
Map of the types of the subdivisions in the USSR as of 1983, with autonomous okrugs shown in pink.

In 1990, ten autonomous okrugs existed within the RSFSR. Between 2005 and 2008, the three autonomous okrugs in which the titular nationality constituted more than 30% of the population were abolished. Since then, three more have been abolished, leaving four. On 13 May 2020, the governors of Arkhangelsk Oblast and Nenets Autonomous Okrug announced their plan to merge following the collapse of oil prices stemming from the COVID-19 pandemic. The process was subsequently scrapped on July 2 following public outcry to the merger.

The ten autonomous okrugs in 1990 were:

| Entity in 1990 | Status in August 2008 |
|---|---|
| Agin-Buryat Autonomous Okrug | now Agin-Buryat Okrug of Zabaykalsky Krai |
| Chukotka Autonomous Okrug within Magadan Oblast | no longer subordinated to Magadan Oblast |
| Evenk Autonomous Okrug within Krasnoyarsk Krai | now Evenkiysky District of Krasnoyarsk Krai |
| Khanty–Mansi Autonomous Okrug within Tyumen Oblast | (no change) |
| Komi-Permyak Autonomous Okrug | now Komi-Permyak Okrug of Perm Krai |
| Koryak Autonomous Okrug within Kamchatka Oblast | now Koryak Okrug of Kamchatka Krai |
| Nenets Autonomous Okrug within Arkhangelsk Oblast | (no change) |
| Taymyr Autonomous Okrug within Krasnoyarsk Krai | now Taymyrsky Dolgano-Nenetsky District of Krasnoyarsk Krai |
| Ust-Orda Buryat Autonomous Okrug within Irkutsk Oblast | now Ust-Orda Buryat Okrug of Irkutsk Oblast |
| Yamalo-Nenets Autonomous Okrug within Tyumen Oblast | (no change) |

== Ethnic composition of autonomous okrugs ==
The table below also includes autonomous okrugs which have since changed status.

| Autonomous Okrug | Demographic composition (titular nation, Russians, other) | | | |
| year | 1979 | 1989 | 2002 | 2010 |
|---|---|---|---|---|
| Agin-Buryat Autonomous Okrug | ▲52.2, ▼42, | ▲54.9, ▼40.8, | ▲62.5, ▼35.1, | ▲65.1, ▼32.5, |
| Komi-Permyak Autonomous Okrug | ▲61.6, ▼34.9, | ▼60.2, ▲36.1, | ▼59, ▲38.1, | , , |
| Koryak Autonomous Okrug (all Indigenous) | 16.3, 62.9, | ▲16.45, ▼62, 24.9 | ▲26.6, ▼50.5, ▲40.5 | ▲30.3, ▼46.2, ▲46.5 |
| Nenets Autonomous Okrug (Nenets) | ▼12.8, ▲66, ▼11.1 | ▼11.9, ▼65.8, ▼9.5 | ▲18.6, ▼62.4, ▲10.8 | 18.6, ▲66.1, ▼9 |
| Taymyr Autonomous Okrug (Dolgan and Nenets) | ▼9.6, ▲68.9, ▼5 | ▼8.9, ▼67.1, ▼4.4 | ▲13.8, ▼58.6, ▲7.6 | ▲15.7, ▼50.0, ▲10.1 |
| Ust-Orda Buryat Autonomous Okrug | ▲34.1, ▼58.3, | ▲36.3, ▼56.5, | ▲39.6, ▼54.4, | ▲39.8, ▼54.2, |
| Khanty–Mansi Autonomous Okrug | ▼1.9, ▼74.3, ▼1.1 | ▼0.9, ▼66.3, ▼0.5 | ▲1.2, ▼66, ▲0.7 | ▲1.3, ▲68.1, ▲0.8 |
| Chukotka Autonomous Okrug (all Indigenous) | ▼8.1, ▼68.6, | ▼7.3, ▼66.1, 9.6 | ▲23.4, ▼51.8, ▲30.8 | ▲26.7, ▲52.5, ▲35.3 |
| Evenk Autonomous Okrug | ▼20, ▲62.5, | ▼14.1, ▲67.5, | ▲21.5, ▼61.9, | ▲22.0, ▼59.4, |
| Yamalo-Nenets Autonomous Okrug (Nenets) | ▼10.7, ▲59.1, | ▼4.2, ▲59.2, ▼1.5 | ▲5.2, ▼58.8, ▲1.7 | ▲5.9, ▲61.7, ▲1.9 |

== See also ==
- Autonomous republics of the Soviet Union
- Autonomous oblasts of the Soviet Union
- Federal subjects of Russia
- Oblasts of Russia
- Republics of Russia
- Krais of Russia
- Federal cities of Russia
- Jewish Autonomous Oblast
