= Makaryevsky =

Makaryevsky (masculine), Makaryevskaya (feminine), or Makaryevskoye (neuter) may refer to:

- Makaryevsky District, a district of Kostroma Oblast, Russia
- Makaryevsky (rural locality) (Makaryevskaya, Makaryevskoye), name of several rural localities in Russia
