= Novonukutsky =

Rural locality in Irkutsk Oblast, Russia

Coordinates: 53°42′08″N 102°42′21″E

Flag of Novonukutsky

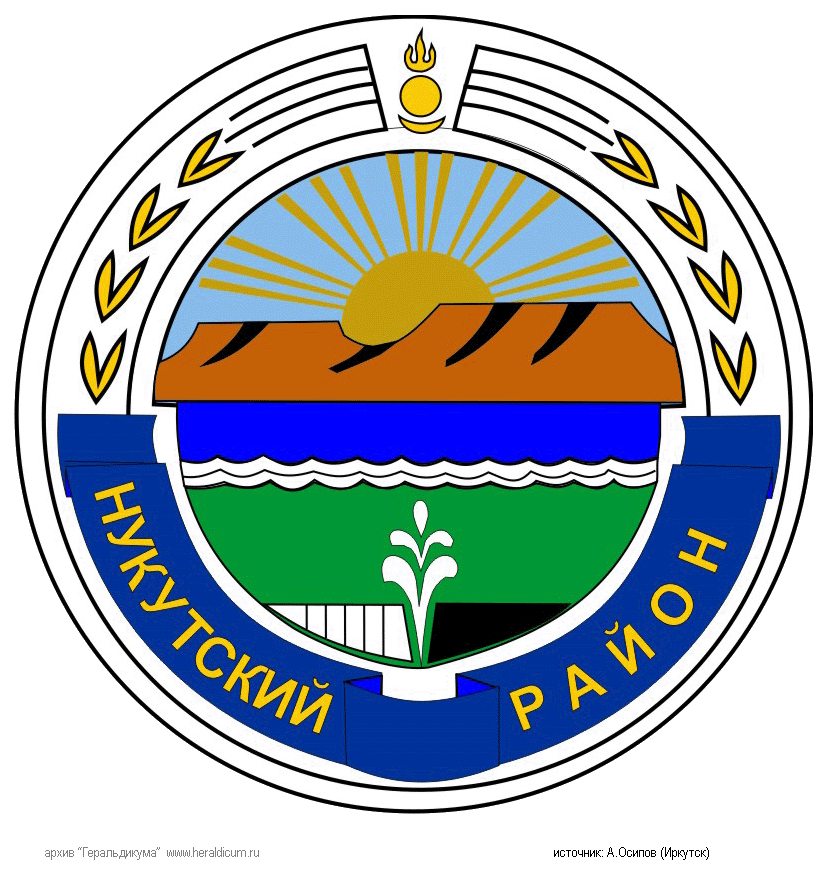
Coat of arms of Novonukutsky

Novonukutsky (Russian: Новонукутский) is a rural locality (a settlement) and the administrative center of Nukutsky District of Ust-Orda Buryat Okrug, Irkutsk Oblast, Russia. Population: 3,434 (2010 census); 3,143 (2002 census); 3,207 (1989 Soviet census).
