= Bayanday =

Rural locality in Irkutsk Oblast, Russia

Bayanday Баяндай
- Village =
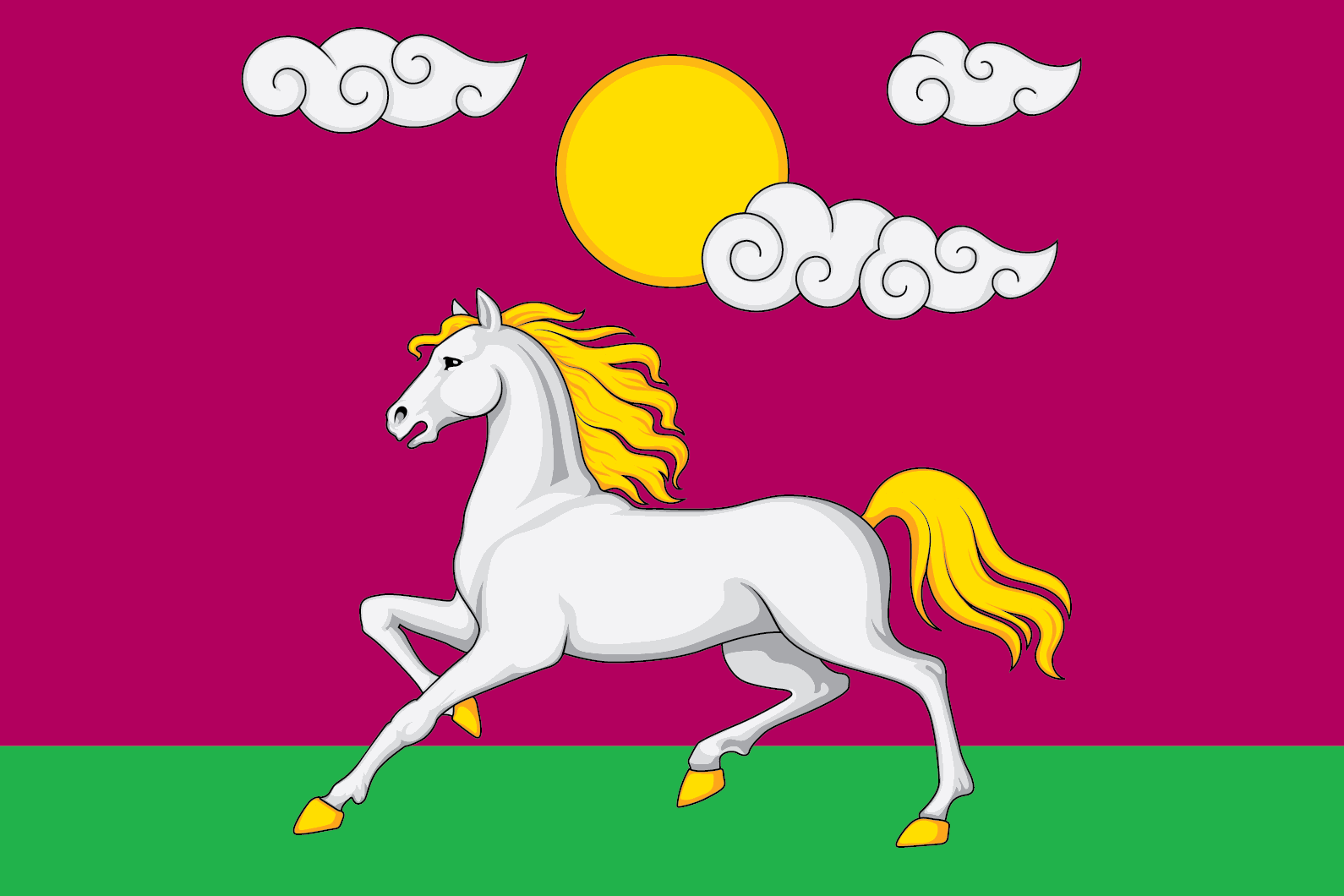
- Flag
- Interactive map of Bayanday
- Location of Bayanday Bayanday (Irkutsk Oblast)
- Coordinates: 53°03′24″N 105°31′33″E
- Country: Russia
- Federal subject: Irkutsk Oblast
- Administrative district: Bayandayevsky District
- Elevation: 653 m (2,142 ft)

Population
  - Estimate (2017): 2,626 )
- Time zone: UTC+8 (MSK+5)
- Postal code: 669120
- OKTMO ID: 25607405101

Bayanday (Russian: Баяндай) is a rural locality (a selo) and the administrative center of Bayandayevsky District of Ust-Orda Buryat Okrug, Irkutsk Oblast, Russia. Population: 2,672 (2010 census); 2,874 (2002 census); 3,383 (1989 Soviet census).
