= Abramovka (selo), Talovsky District, Voronezh Oblast =

Abramovka Абрамовка
- Selo
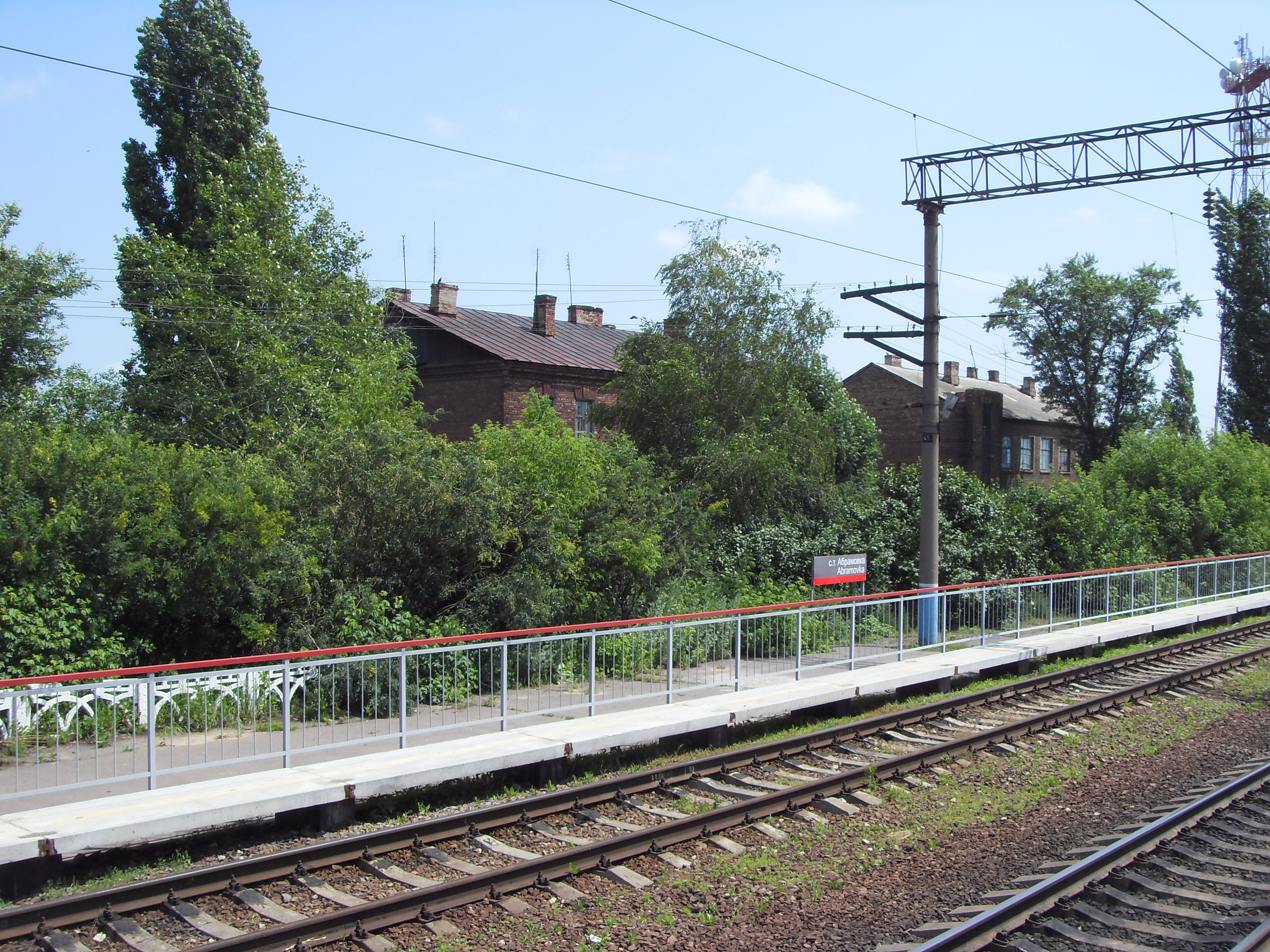
- Abramovka, Voronezhskaya oblast, Russia

- Location within Voronezh Oblast Location within Russia
- Coordinates: 51°13′N 41°06′E
- Country: Russia
- Region: Voronezh Oblast
- District: Talovsky District
- Time zone: UTC+3:00

Abramovka (Russian: Абрамовка) is a rural locality (a selo) in Abramovskoye Rural Settlement, Talovsky District, Voronezh Oblast, Russia. The population was 423 as of 2010. There are five streets.

== Geography ==
Abramovka is located 25 km northeast of Talovaya (the district's administrative centre) by road. Uchastok №4 is the nearest rural locality.
