= Kamennaya Steppe =

Nature preserve in Voronezh Oblast, Russia

Coordinates: 51.061261°N 40.73057°E

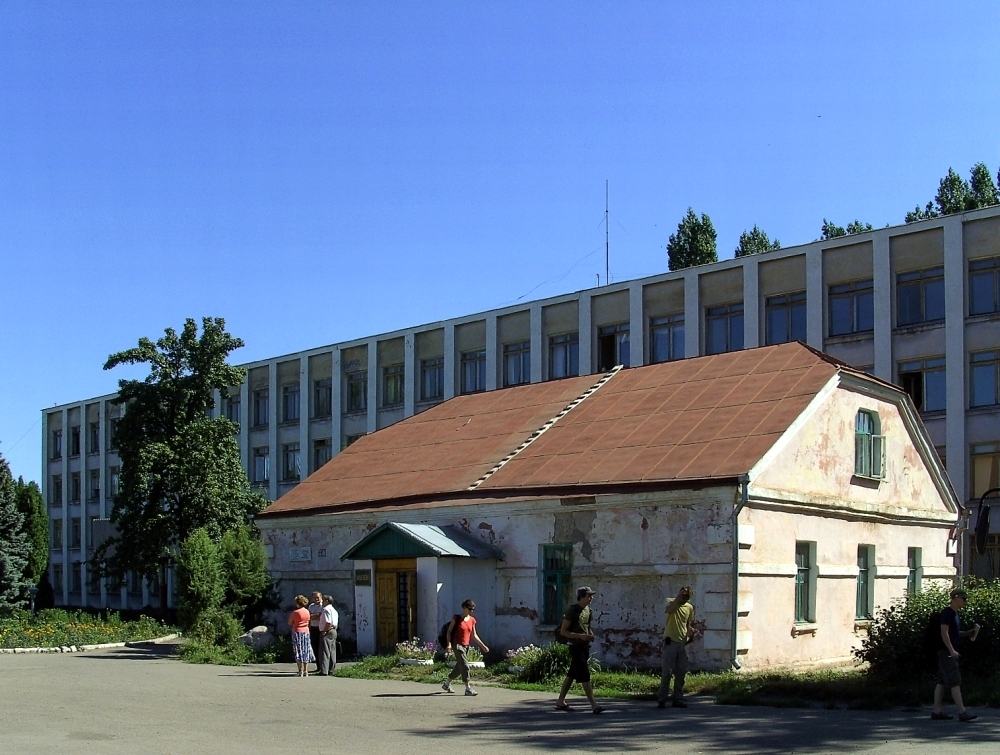
Kamennaya Steppe main building with the museum in front

The Kamennaya Steppe (Russian: Каменная степь) is a Russian federal nature preserve located in Talovsky District in Voronezh Oblast in the watershed of rivers Bityug and Khopyor (both tributaries of the Don).

It is a research institute, where the study of Kamennaya Steppe soils began in 1893 by the father of modern soil science Vasily Dokuchaev.
