= Osa, Irkutsk Oblast =

Rural locality in Irkutsk Oblast, Russia

Coordinates: 53°23′15″N 103°52′49″E

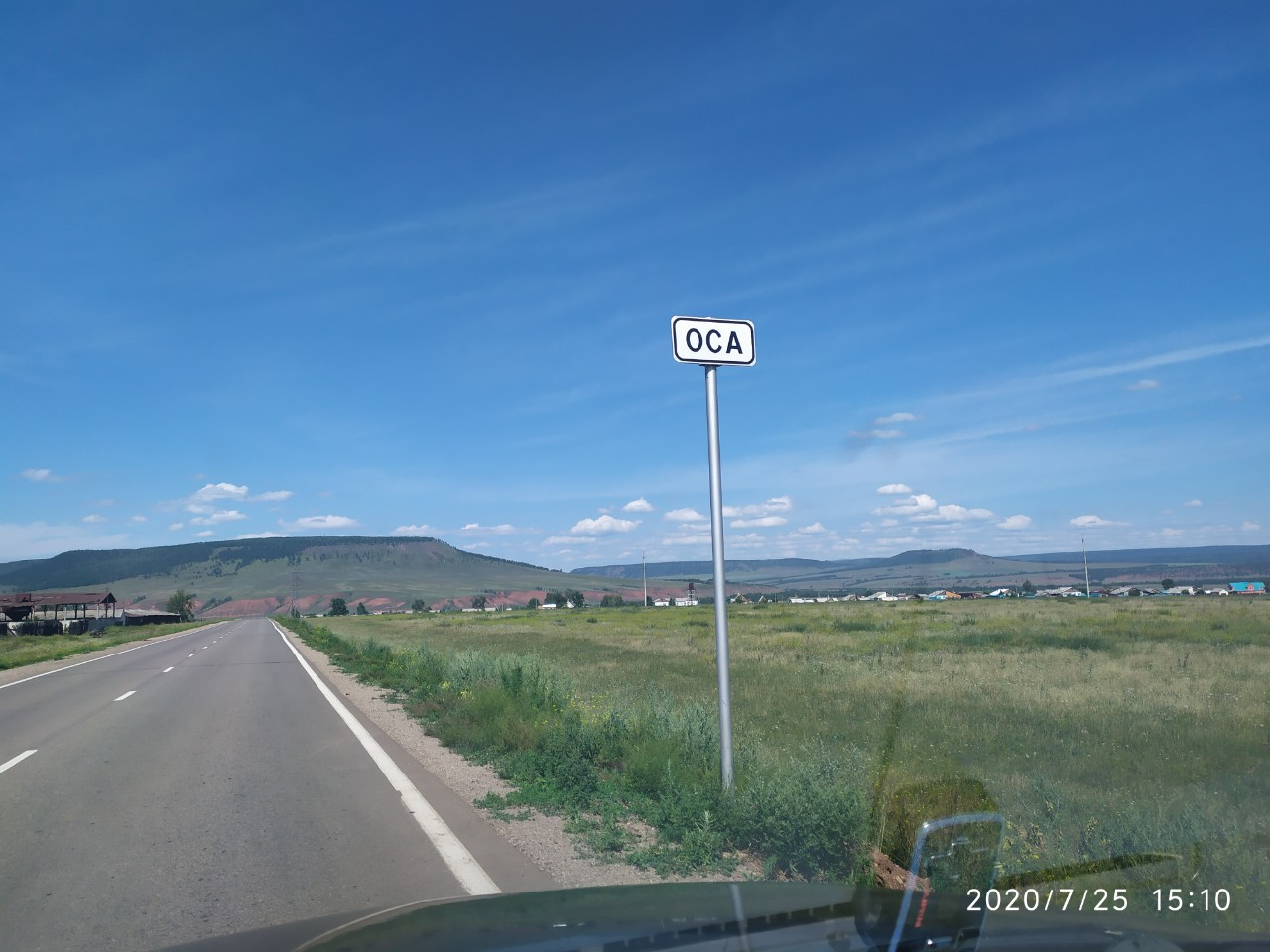
Osa, Irkutsk Oblast

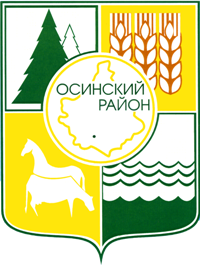
Coat of arms of Osa

Osa (Russian: Оса́, Buryat: Оһо, Oho) is a rural locality (a selo) and the administrative center of Osinsky District of Ust-Orda Buryat Okrug, Irkutsk Oblast, Russia. Population: 4,523 (2010 census); 4,486 (2002 census);
