= Makaryevsky (rural locality) =

Makaryevsky (Russian: Мака́рьевский; masculine), Makaryevskaya (Мака́рьевская; feminine), or Makaryevskoye (Мака́рьевское; neuter) is the name of several rural localities in Russia:

- Makaryevskoye, Altai Krai, a selo in Ust-Kazhinsky Selsoviet of Krasnogorsky District of Altai Krai
- Makaryevskoye, Kurgan Oblast, a village in Peskovsky Selsoviet of Dalmatovsky District of Kurgan Oblast
- Makaryevskoye, Nizhny Novgorod Oblast, a selo in Makaryevsky Selsoviet of Vetluzhsky District of Nizhny Novgorod Oblast
- Makaryevskaya, Irkutsk Oblast, a village in Nukutsky District of Irkutsk Oblast
- Makaryevskaya, Leningrad Oblast, a village in Vinnitskoye Settlement Municipal Formation of Podporozhsky District of Leningrad Oblast
- Makaryevskaya, Tver Oblast, a village in Kalyazinsky District of Tver Oblast
- Makaryevskaya, Vologda Oblast, a village in Pyazhozersky Selsoviet of Babayevsky District of Vologda Oblast
