= Kutulik =

Kutulik Кутулик
- Selo
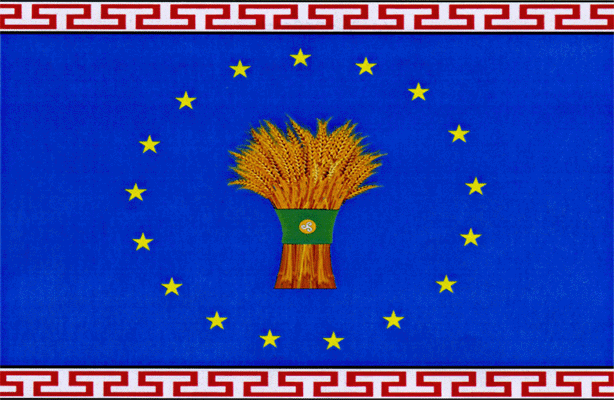
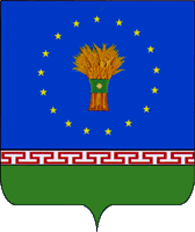
- Flag Coat of arms
- Interactive map of Kutulik
- Location of Kutulik Kutulik (Irkutsk Oblast)
- Coordinates: 53°20′53″N 102°47′31″E
- Country: Russia
- Federal subject: Irkutsk Oblast
- Administrative district: Alarsky District

Population (2010 Census)
  - Total: 4,884
  - Estimate (2021): 5,101 (+4.4%)

Administrative status
  - Capital of: Alarsky District

Municipal status
  - Municipal district: Alarsky Municipal District
  - Rural settlement: Kutulik Rural Settlement
  - Capital of: Alarsky Municipal District, Kutulik Rural Settlement
- Time zone: UTC+8 (MSK+5)
- Postal code: 669451
- OKTMO ID: 25605426101

Kutulik (Russian: Кутулик; Buryat: Хутулэг, Khutuleg) is a rural locality (a settlement) and the administrative center of Alarsky District of Ust-Orda Buryat Okrug, Irkutsk Oblast, Russia. Population: 4,884 (2010 census); 5,429 (2002 census); 5,213 (1989 Soviet census).
