= Abramovka, Vladimir Oblast =

Abramovka Абрамовка
- Village
- Location within Vladimir Oblast Location within Russia
- Coordinates: 56°19′N 39°22′E
- Country: Russia
- Region: Vladimir Oblast
- District: Kolchuginsky District
- Time zone: UTC+3:00

Abramovka (Russian: Абрамовка) is a rural locality (a village) in Kolchugino, Kolchuginsky District, Vladimir Oblast, Russia. The population was 16 as of 2010.

== Geography ==
Abramovka is located on the Peksha River, 5 km north of Kolchugino (the district's administrative centre) by road. Otyayevka is the nearest rural locality.
