= Abramovka, Verkhnekhavsky District, Voronezh Oblast =

Abramovka Абрамовка
- Village
- Location within Voronezh Oblast Location within Russia
- Coordinates: 51°54′N 40°03′E
- Country: Russia
- Region: Voronezh Oblast
- District: Verkhnekhavsky District
- Time zone: UTC+3:00

Abramovka (Russian: Абрамовка) is a rural locality (a village) in Semyonovskoye Rural Settlement of Verkhnekhavsky District, Voronezh Oblast, Russia. The population was 3363 as of 2010. There are 30 streets.

== Geography ==
Abramovka is located 18 km northeast of Verkhnyaya Khava (the district's administrative centre) by road. Semyonovka is the nearest rural locality.
