= Flag of Ust-Orda Buryat Okrug =

Flag of the Russian okrug of Ust-Orda Buryatia

Flag of Ust-Orda Buryat Okrug

The flag of Ust-Orda Buryat Okrug, in the Russian Federation, is a blue field charged with a white argabar sun emblem within a golden disc. The disc is surrounded with four golden bezants at the cardinal positions. At the bottom of the flag is a white band charged with a red meander ornament, which symbolizes the lifestyle in the past and a prosperous future for the Buryat tribes.

The blue symbolizes the sky. The white symbolizes cleanness and the heavens. The red symbolizes bravery, fire, warmth, the sun, and blood. The gold symbolizes the light of the sun, richness, and happiness.

An earlier design was adopted on July 17, 1997 which consisted of a green field. The field was changed to blue on September 18 of that same year. The proportions are 2:3.
