= Abramovka, Perm Krai =

Abramovka Абрамовка
- Village
- Location within Perm Krai Location within Russia
- Coordinates: 59°40′N 54°36′E
- Country: Russia
- Region: Perm Krai
- District: Kochyovsky District
- Time zone: UTC+5:00

Abramovka (Russian: Абрамовка) is a rural locality (a village) in Bolshekochinskoye Rural Settlement of Kochyovsky District, Perm Krai, Russia. The population was 20 as of 2010. There are 2 streets.

== Geography ==
Abramovka is located 23 km northeast of Kochyovo (the district's administrative centre) by road. Bolshaya Kocha is the nearest rural locality.
