= Bayandayevsky District =

Bayandayevsky District Баяндаевский район (Russian)
- District
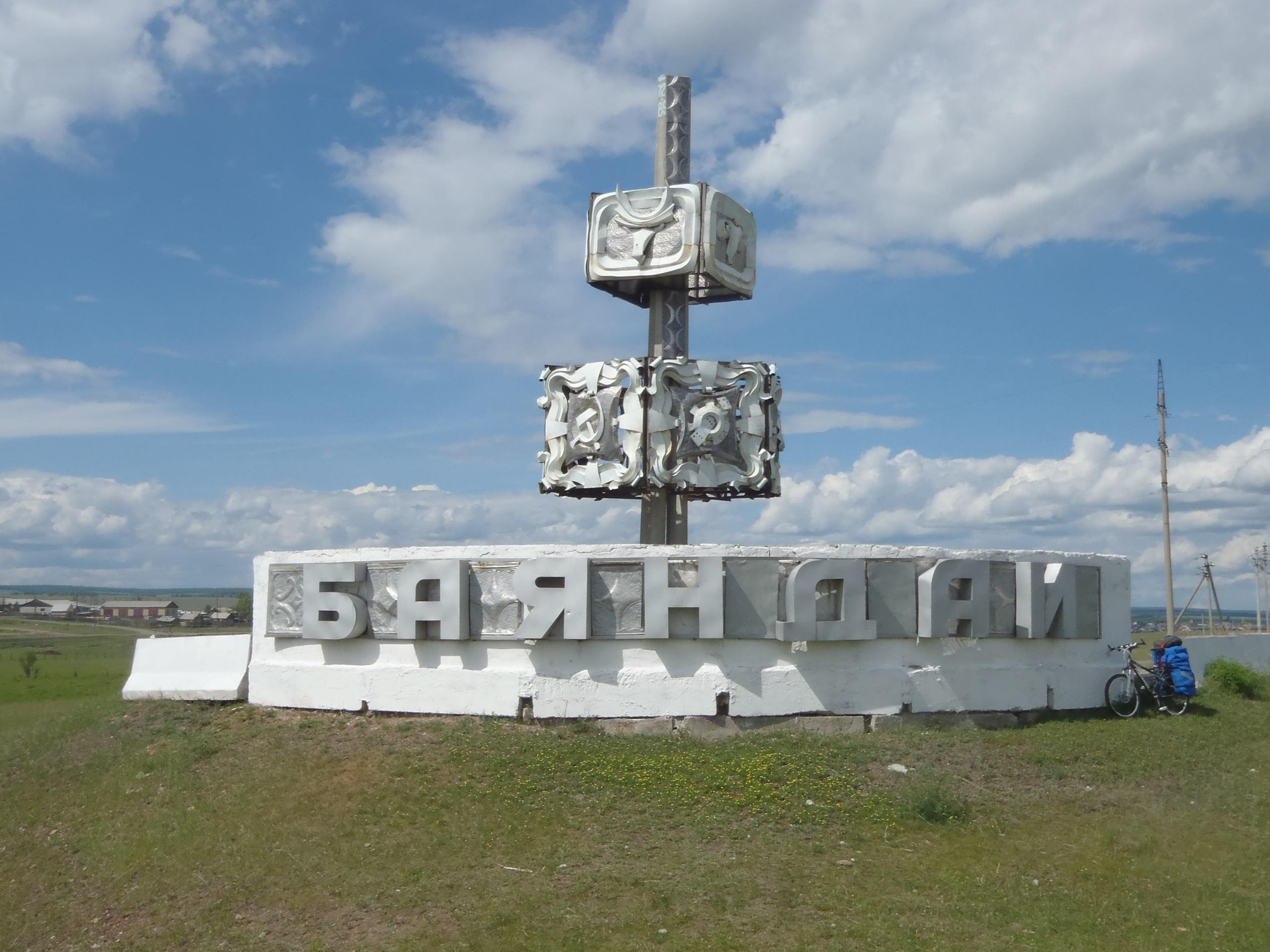
- District marker, Bayandayevsky District

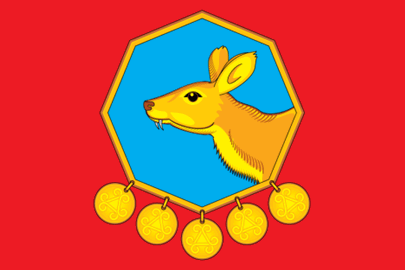
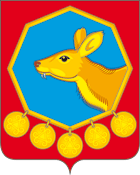
- Flag Coat of arms
- Location of Bayandayevsky District in Ust-Orda Buryat Okrug, Irkutsk Oblast
- Coordinates: 53°04′N 105°30′E
- Country: Russia
- Federal subject: Irkutsk Oblast
- Established: 1941
- Administrative center: Bayanday

Area
  - Total: 3,756.2 km^{2} (1,450.3 sq mi)

Population (2010 Census)
  - Total: 11,529
  - Density: 3.0693/km^{2} (7.9495/sq mi)
  - Urban: 0%
  - Rural: 100%

Administrative structure
  - Inhabited localities: 49 rural localities

Municipal structure
  - Municipally incorporated as: Bayandayevsky Municipal District
  - Municipal divisions: 0 urban settlements, 12 rural settlements
- Time zone: UTC+8 (MSK+5)
- OKTMO ID: 25607000
- Website: http://bayanday.irkobl.ru/

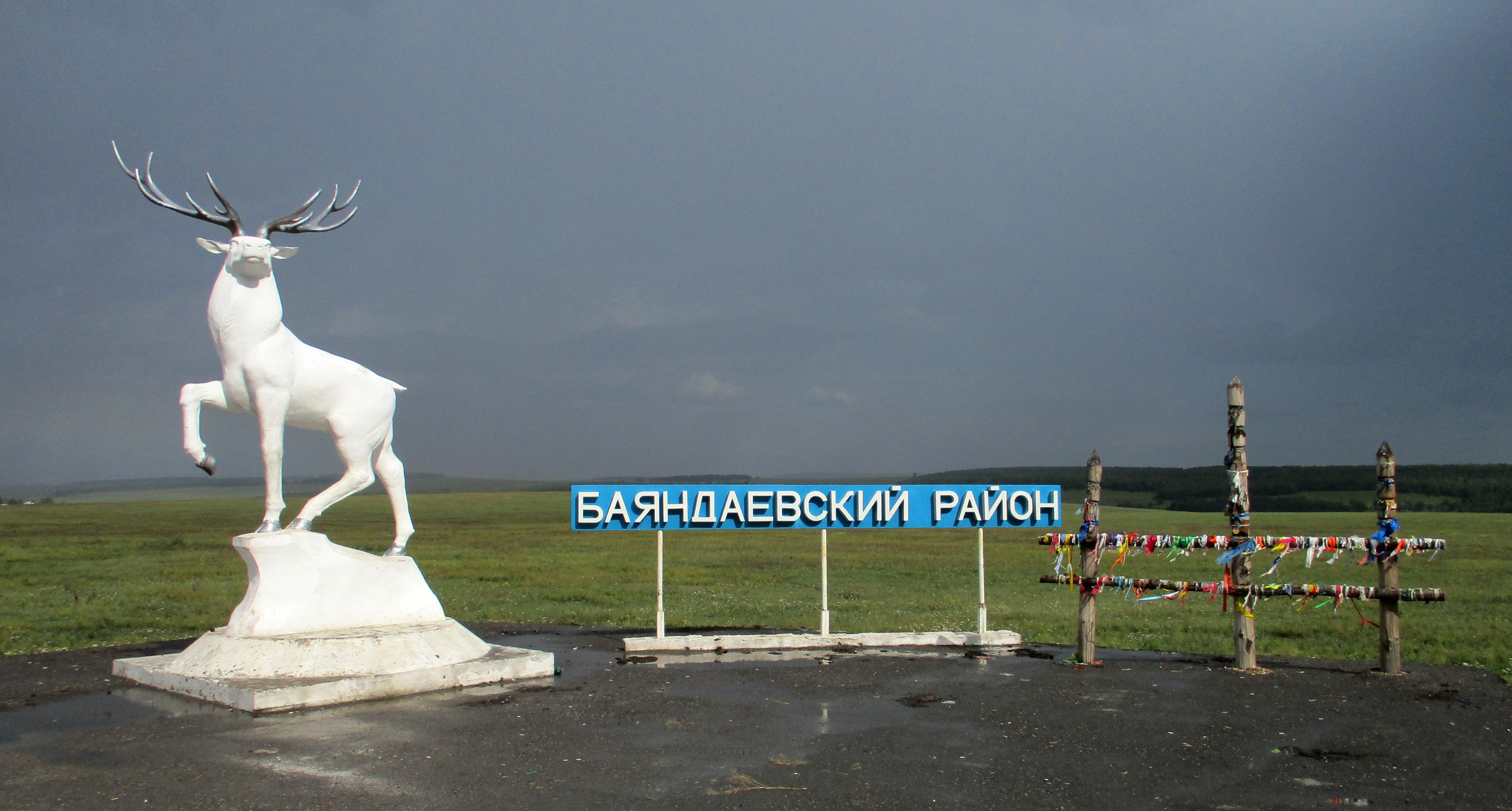
Entrance sign

Bayandayevsky District (Russian: Баянда́евский райо́н; Buryat: Баяндайн аймаг, Baiandain aimag) is an administrative district of the Ust-Orda Buryat Okrug of Irkutsk Oblast, Russia, one of the thirty-three in the oblast. Municipally, it is incorporated as Bayandayevsky Municipal District. It is located in the southern part of the oblast. The area of the district is 3,756.2 square kilometers (1,450.3 sq mi). Its administrative center is the rural locality (a selo) of Bayanday. Population: 11,529 (2010 census); 13,730 (2002 Census); 14,808 (1989 Soviet census). The population of Bayanday accounts for 23.2% of the district's total population.
