= Ekhirit-Bulagatsky District =

Ekhirit-Bulagatsky District Эхирит-Булагатский район (Russian)
- District
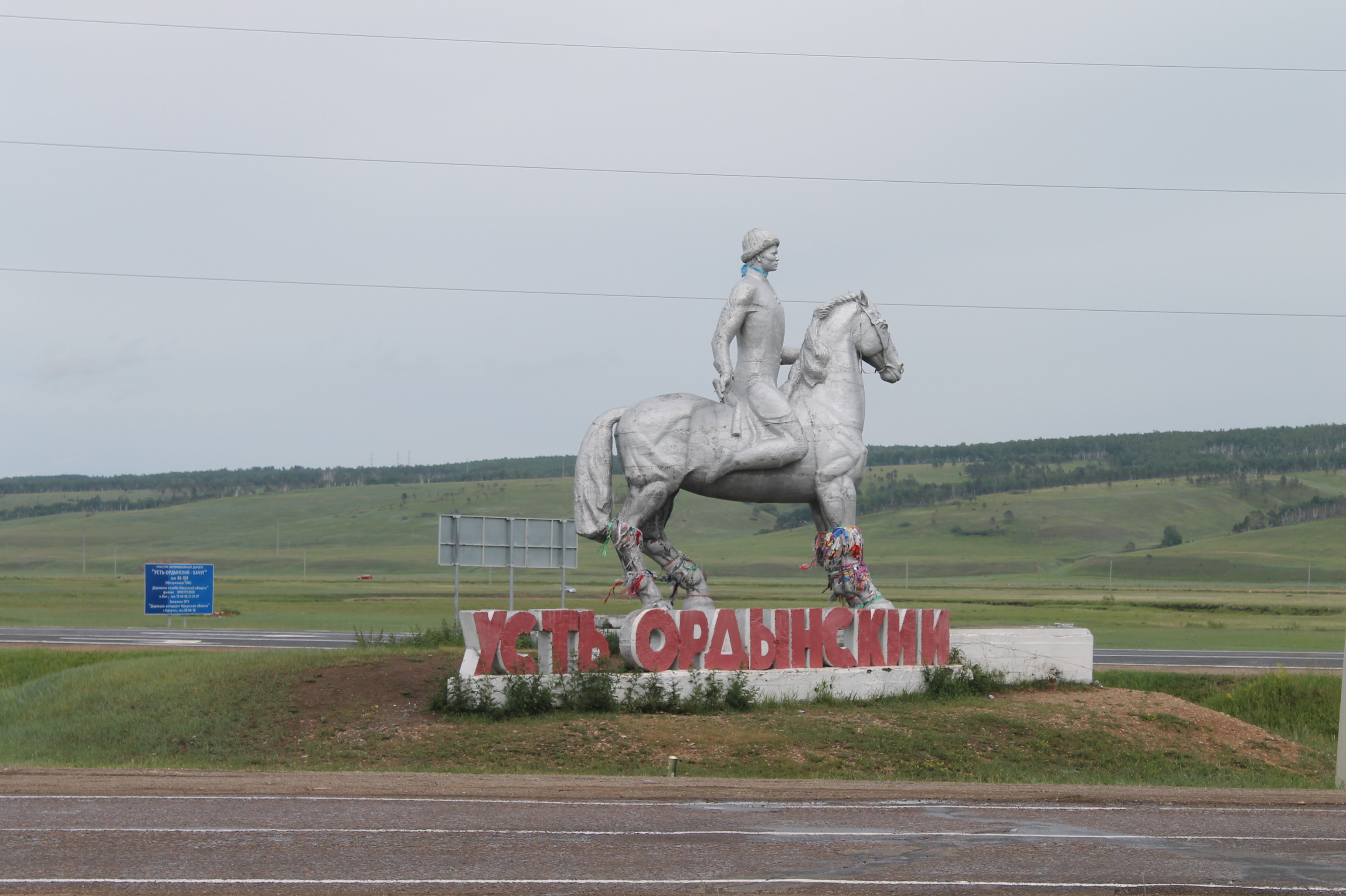
- Welcome sign at the entrance to the settlement of Ust-Ordynsky in Ekhirit-Bulagatsky District

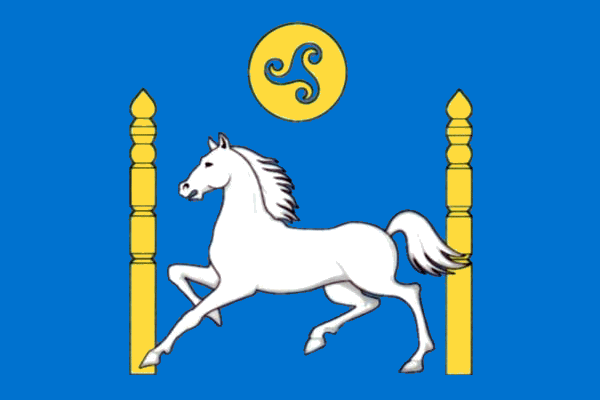
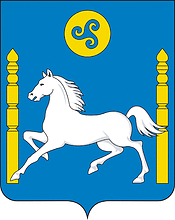
- Flag Coat of arms
- Location of Ekhirit-Bulagatsky District in Ust-Orda Buryat Okrug, Irkutsk Oblast
- Coordinates: 52°49′N 104°46′E
- Country: Russia
- Federal subject: Irkutsk Oblast
- Established: 20 January 1993
- Administrative center: Ust-Ordynsky

Area
  - Total: 5,200 km^{2} (2,000 sq mi)

Population (2010 Census)
  - Total: 30,597
  - Density: 5.9/km^{2} (15/sq mi)
  - Urban: 0%
  - Rural: 100%

Administrative structure
  - Inhabited localities: 50 rural localities

Municipal structure
  - Municipally incorporated as: Ekhirit-Bulagatsky Municipal District
  - Municipal divisions: 0 urban settlements, 13 rural settlements
- Time zone: UTC+8 (MSK+5)
- OKTMO ID: 25657000
- Website: http://ehirit.ru

Population of Ekhirit-Bulagatsky District
- 2010 Census: 30,597
- 2002 Census: 29,787
- 1989 Census: 29,005
- 1979 Census: 16,014

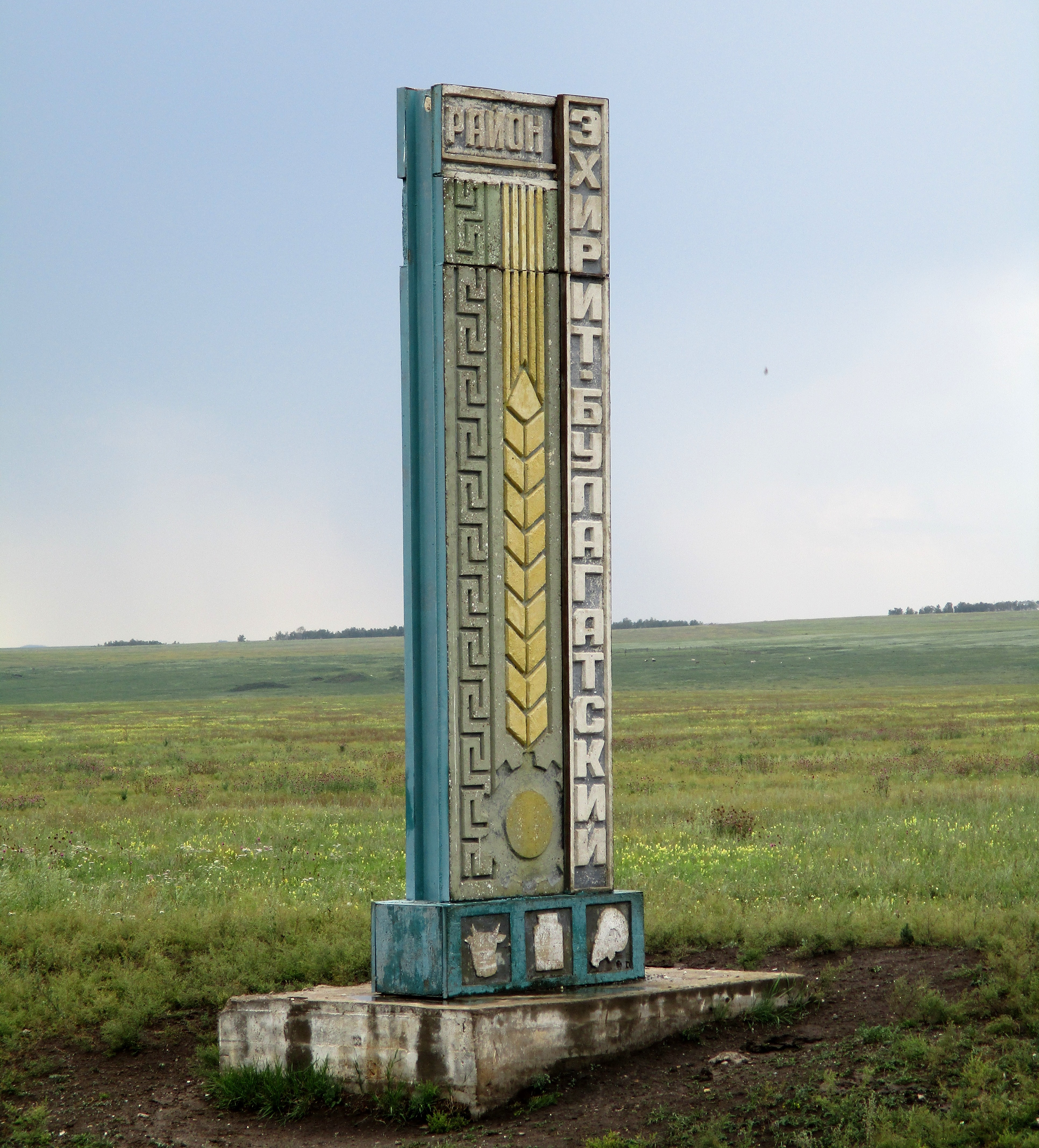
Entrance sign

Ekhirit-Bulagatsky District (Russian: Эхири́т-Булага́тский райо́н; Buryat: Эхирэд Булагадай аймаг, Ekhired Bulagadai aimag) is an administrative district of Ust-Orda Buryat Okrug of Irkutsk Oblast, Russia, one of the thirty-three in the oblast. Municipally, it is incorporated as Ekhirit-Bulagatsky Municipal District. It is located in the south of the oblast. The area of the district is 5,200 square kilometers (2,000 sq mi). Its administrative center is the rural locality (a settlement) of Ust-Ordynsky. As of the 2010 Census, the total population of the district was 30,597, with the population of Ust-Ordynsky accounting for 48.7% of that number.
