= Alarsky District =

Alarsky District Аларский район (Russian)
- District
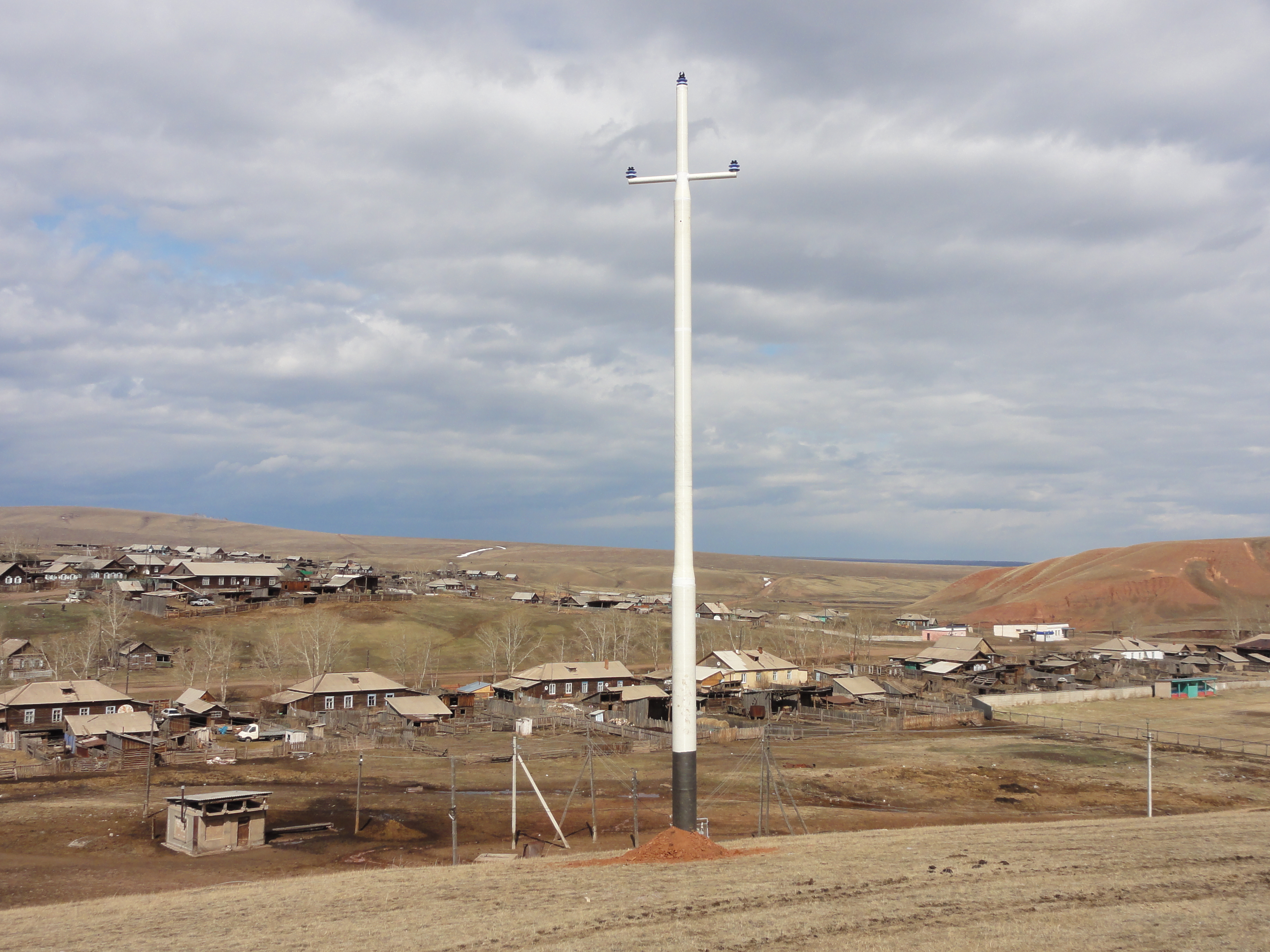
- Landscape of Alarsky District

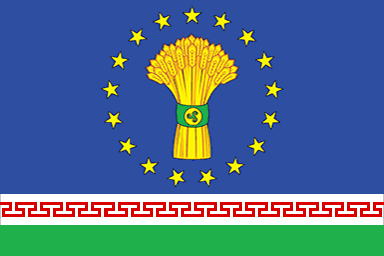
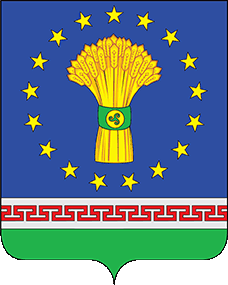
- Flag Coat of arms
- Location of Alarsky District in Ust-Orda Buryat Okrug, Irkutsk Oblast
- Coordinates: 53°20′N 102°46′E
- Country: Russia
- Federal subject: Irkutsk Oblast
- Established: 1922
- Administrative center: Kutulik

Area
  - Total: 2,700 km^{2} (1,000 sq mi)

Population (2010 Census)
  - Total: 21,479
  - Density: 8.0/km^{2} (21/sq mi)
  - Urban: 0%
  - Rural: 100%

Administrative structure
  - Inhabited localities: 73 rural localities

Municipal structure
  - Municipally incorporated as: Alarsky Municipal District
  - Municipal divisions: 0 urban settlements, 17 rural settlements
- Time zone: UTC+8 (MSK+5)
- OKTMO ID: 25605000
- Website: http://alar.irkobl.ru

Population of Alarsky District
- 2010 Census: 21,479
- 2002 Census: 26,742
- 1989 Census: 27,993
- 1979 Census: 29,546

Alarsky District (Russian: Ала́рский райо́н; Buryat: Алайрай аймаг, Alairai aimag) is an administrative district of Ust-Orda Buryat Okrug of Irkutsk Oblast, Russia, one of the thirty-three in the oblast. Municipally, it is incorporated as Alarsky Municipal District. It is located in the south of the oblast. The area of the district is 2,700 square kilometers (1,000 sq mi). Its administrative center is the rural locality (a settlement) of Kutulik. As of the 2010 Census, the total population of the district was 21,479, with the population of Kutulik accounting for 22.7% of that number.
