= Nukutsky District =

Nukutsky District Нукутский район (Russian)
- District
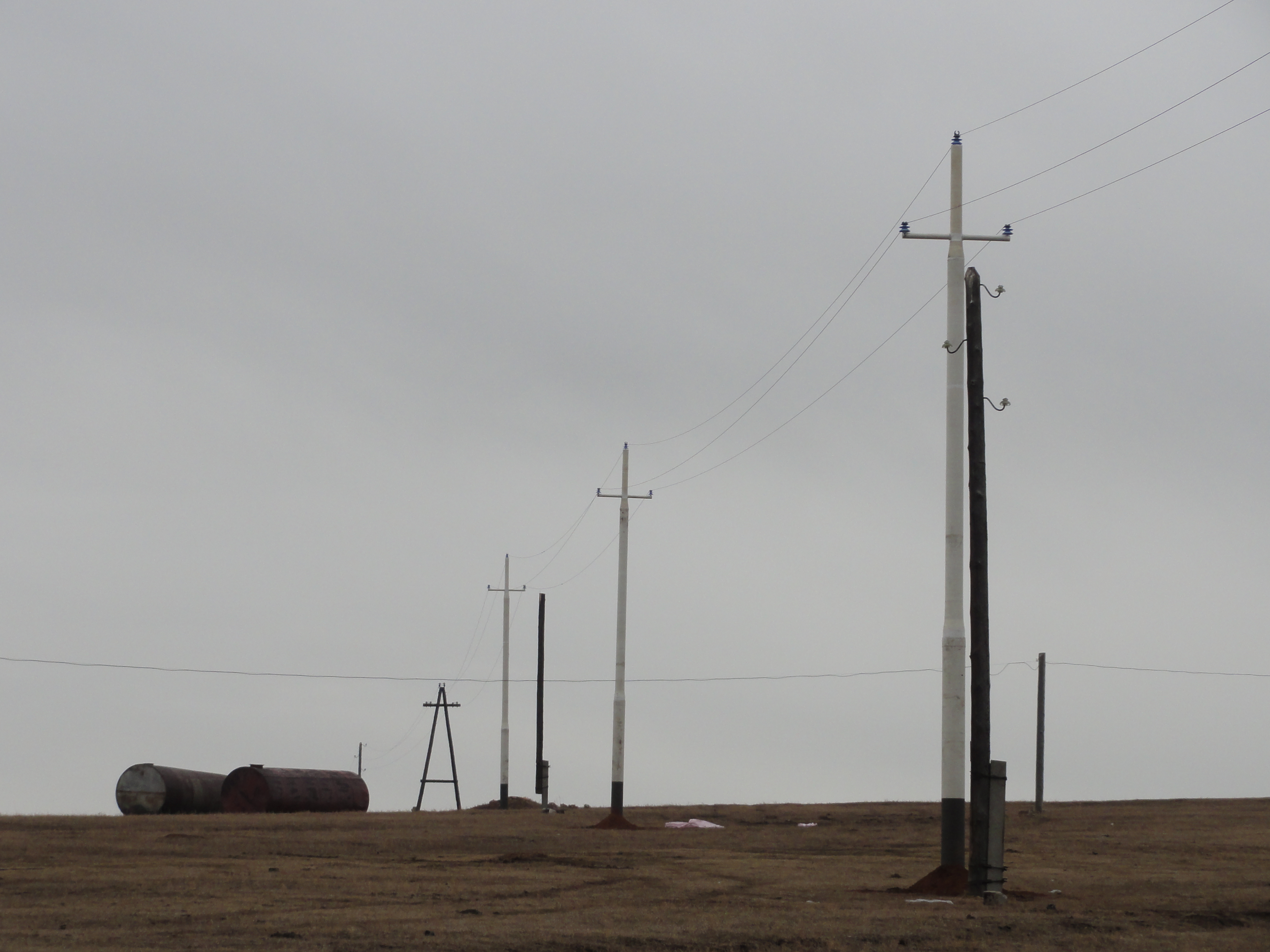
- Replacing wooden power poles with modern fiberglass, Nukutsky District

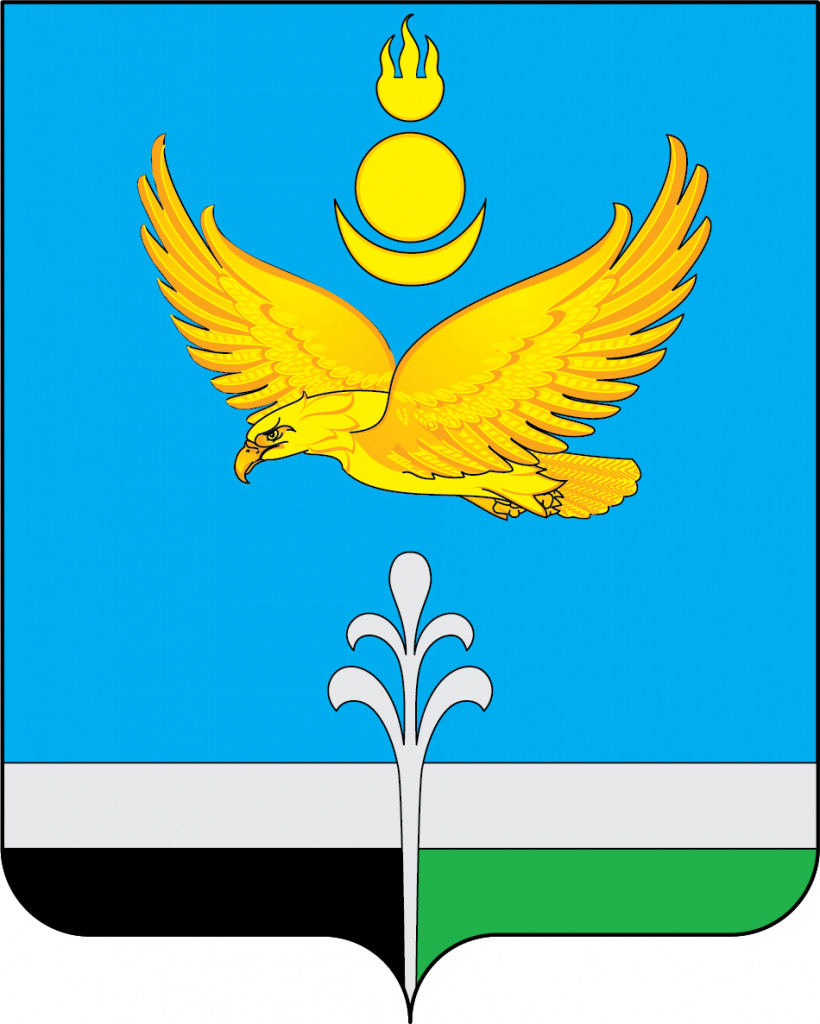
- Flag Coat of arms
- Location of Nukutsky District in Ust-Orda Buryat Okrug, Irkutsk Oblast
- Coordinates: 53°43′N 102°42′E
- Country: Russia
- Federal subject: Irkutsk Oblast
- Established: 1972
- Administrative center: Novonukutsky

Area
  - Total: 2,400 km^{2} (930 sq mi)

Population (2010 Census)
  - Total: 15,743
  - Density: 6.6/km^{2} (17/sq mi)
  - Urban: 0%
  - Rural: 100%

Administrative structure
  - Inhabited localities: 37 rural localities

Municipal structure
  - Municipally incorporated as: Nukutsky Municipal District
  - Municipal divisions: 0 urban settlements, 10 rural settlements
- Time zone: UTC+8 (MSK+5)
- OKTMO ID: 25629000
- Website: http://nukut.irkobl.ru/

Nukutsky District (Russian: Нукутский райо́н; Buryat: Нγхэдэй аймаг, Nükhedei aimag) is an administrative district of Ust-Orda Buryat Okrug of Irkutsk Oblast, Russia, one of the thirty-three in the oblast. Municipally, it is incorporated as Nukutsky Municipal District. It is located in the south of the oblast. The area of the district is 2,400 square kilometers (930 sq mi). Its administrative center is the rural locality (a settlement) of Novonukutsky. Population: 15,743 (2010 census); 17,209 (2002 Census); 17,110 (1989 Soviet census). The population of Novo-Nukutsky accounts for 21.8% of the district's total population.
