= Ust-Ordynsky =

Ust-Ordynsky Усть-Ордынский
- Settlement

Other transcription(s)
  - Buryat: Ордын Адаг
- Interactive map of Ust-Ordynsky
- Location of Ust-Ordynsky Ust-Ordynsky (Irkutsk Oblast)
- Coordinates: 52°48′20″N 104°45′44″E
- Country: Russia
- Federal subject: Irkutsk Oblast
- Rural locality status since: 1992
- Elevation: 510 m (1,670 ft)

Population (2010 Census)
  - Total: 14,891
  - Estimate (2014): 14,314 (−3.9%)

Administrative status
  - Capital of: Ust-Orda Buryat Okrug, Ekhirit-Bulagatsky District
- Time zone: UTC+8 (MSK+5)
- Postal codes: 669001, 669002
- Dialing code: +7 39541
- OKTMO ID: 25657444101

Ust-Ordynsky (Russian: Усть-Орды́нский, Buryat: Ордын Адаг, romanized: Ordyn Adag) is a rural locality (a settlement) and the administrative center of Ekhirit-Bulagatsky District of Ust-Orda Buryat Okrug in Irkutsk Oblast, Russia, as well as the administrative center of Ust-Orda Buryat Okrug. It is located on the right bank of the Kuda River (Angara River's tributary) 62 kilometers (39 mi) northeast of Irkutsk. Population: 14,891 (2010 census); 14,335 (2002 census); 13,030 (1989 Soviet census).
