= Osinsky District, Irkutsk Oblast =

Osinsky District Осинский район (Russian)
- District
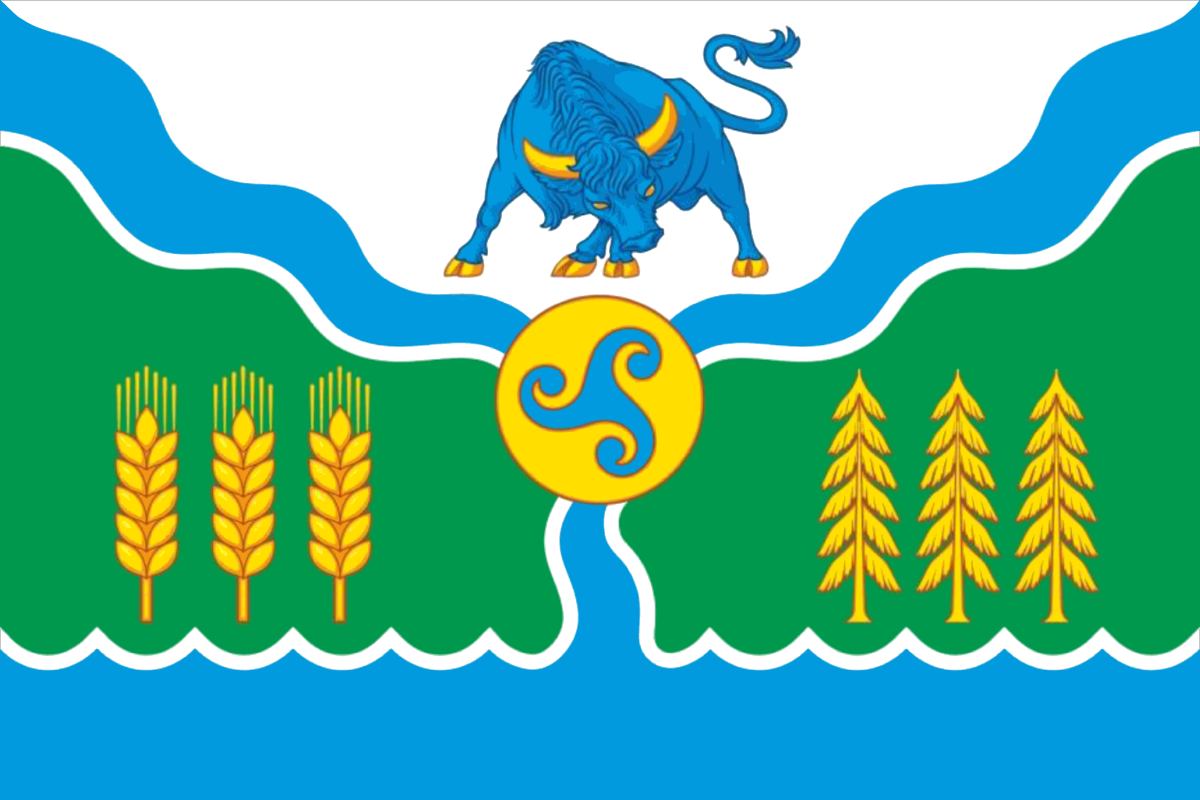
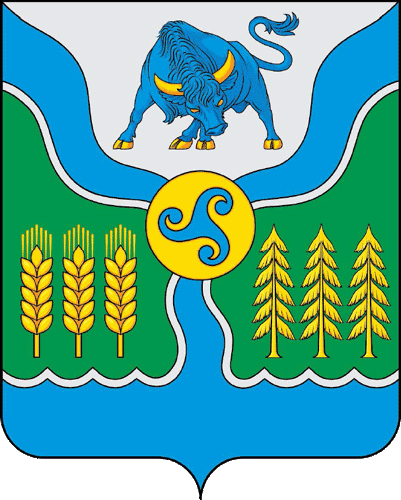
- Flag Coat of arms
- Location of Osinsky District in Ust-Orda Buryat Okrug, Irkutsk Oblast
- Coordinates: 53°24′N 103°53′E
- Country: Russia
- Federal subject: Irkutsk Oblast
- Administrative center: Osa

Area
  - Total: 4,400 km^{2} (1,700 sq mi)

Population (2010 Census)
  - Total: 20,431
  - Density: 4.6/km^{2} (12/sq mi)
  - Urban: 0%
  - Rural: 100%

Administrative structure
  - Inhabited localities: 37 rural localities

Municipal structure
  - Municipally incorporated as: Osinsky Municipal District
  - Municipal divisions: 0 urban settlements, 12 rural settlements
- Time zone: UTC+8 (MSK+5)
- OKTMO ID: 25631000
- Website: http://osaadm.ru/

Osinsky District (Russian: Оси́нский райо́н; Buryat: Оһын аймаг, Ohyn aimag) is an administrative district of Ust-Orda Buryat Okrug of Irkutsk Oblast, Russia, one of the thirty-three in the oblast. Municipally, it is incorporated as Osinsky Municipal District. It is located in the south of the oblast. The area of the district is 4,400 square kilometers (1,700 sq mi). Its administrative center is the rural locality (a selo) of Osa. Population: 20,431 (2010 census); 20,962 (2002 Census); 20,668 (1989 Soviet census). The population of Osa accounts for 22.1% of the district's total population.
