= Ust-Orda Buryat Okrug =

Okrug of Irkutsk Oblast, Russia

Ust-Orda Buryat Okrug Усть-Орды́нский Буря́тский о́круг (Russian)
- District
- Flag Coat of arms

- Country: Russia
- Federal subject: Irkutsk Oblast
- Established: 2008
- Administrative center: Ust-Ordynsky

Ust-Orda Buryatia and Lake Baikal

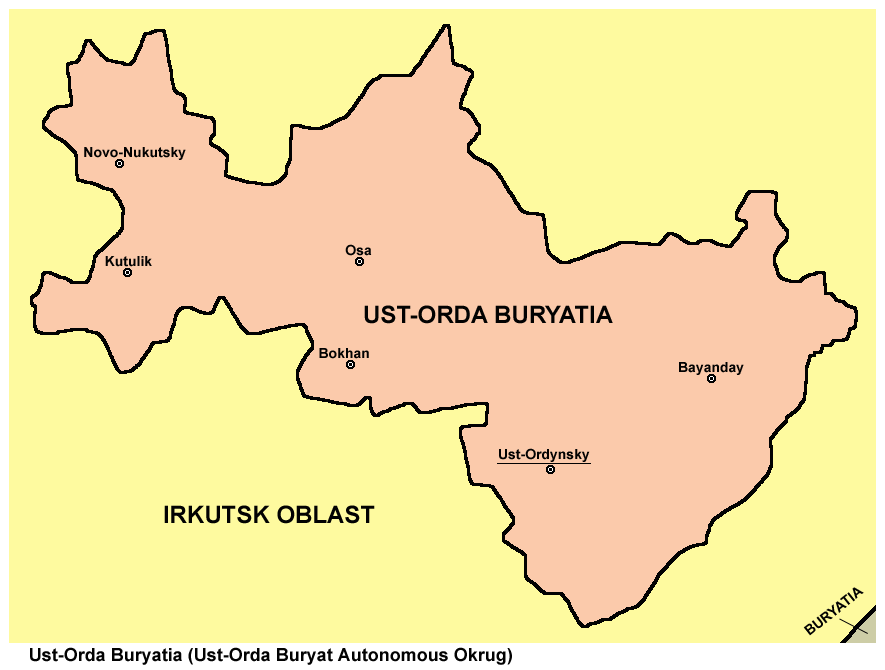
Map of some major inhabited localities of Ust-Orda Buryat Okrug

Ust-Orda Buryat Okrug, (Note: Russian: Усть-Орды́нский Буря́тский о́круг; Buryat: Усть-Ордын (Усть-Ордагай) Буряадай тойрог Ust’-Ordyn (Ust’-Ordagay) Buryaaday toyrog) or Ust-Orda Buryatia, is an administrative division of Irkutsk Oblast, Russia. It was a federal subject of Russia (an autonomous okrug of Irkutsk Oblast) from 1993 to January 1, 2008, when it merged with Irkutsk Oblast. It also had autonomous okrug status from September 26, 1937 to 1993. Prior to the merger, it was called Ust-Orda Buryat Autonomous Okrug (Усть-Орды́нский Буря́тский автоно́мный о́круг). It is one of the two Buryat okrugs in Russia, the other one is Agin-Buryat Okrug in Zabaykalsky Krai.

It has an area of 22,138.1 square kilometers (8,547.6 sq mi). Population: 125,177 (2010 census).

The settlement of Ust-Ordynsky is the autonomous okrug's administrative center and its most populous inhabited locality.

== Merger ==
In a referendum held on April 16, 2006, the majority of residents in Irkutsk Oblast and Ust-Orda Buryat Autonomous Okrug agreed to the unification of the two regions. According to regions' electoral commissions, 68.98% of residents of Irkutsk Oblast and 99.51% of residents in Ust-Orda Buryatia took part in the vote, making it one of the best attended plebiscites in the country since the 2003 Russian election. The merger was approved by an absolute majority of the electorate: by 89.77% in Irkutsk Oblast and by 97.79% in Ust-Orda Buryatia. The enlarged Irkutsk Oblast has officially come into existence on January 1, 2008.

== Administrative divisions ==
The okrug is divided into six administrative districts:

- Alarsky District
- Bayandayevsky District
- Bokhansky District
- Ekhirit-Bulagatsky District
- Nukutsky District
- Osinsky District

== Demographics ==
- Population: 125,177 (2010 census); 135,327 (2002 census); 136,306 (1989 Soviet census).

=== Vital statistics ===
Source: Russian Federal State Statistics Service

	Average population (x 1000)	Live births	Deaths	Natural change	Crude birth rate (per 1000)	Crude death rate (per 1000)	Natural change (per 1000)
1970	146	2,813	1,175	1,638	19.3	8.0	11.2
1975	138	3,014	1,311	1,703	21.8	9.5	12.3
1980	132	3,193	1,346	1,847	24.2	10.2	14.0
1985	132	3,546	1,397	2,149	26.9	10.6	16.3
1990	128	3,383	1,325	2,058	26.5	10.4	16.1
1991	129	3,101	1,424	1,677	24.0	11.0	13.0
1992	131	2,770	1,560	1,210	21.1	11.9	9.2
1993	132	2,379	1,742	637	18.0	13.2	4.8
1994	132	2,385	1,943	442	18.1	14.7	3.4
1995	132	2,186	1,872	314	16.5	14.2	2.4
1996	133	2,155	1,704	451	16.2	12.8	3.4
1997	134	2,010	1,787	223	15.0	13.3	1.7
1998	134	2,011	1,654	357	15.0	12.3	2.7
1999	135	2,018	1,923	95	15.0	14.3	0.7
2000	135	1,932	2,004	72	14.3	14.9	-0.5
2001	135	1,986	1,967	19	14.7	14.6	0.1
2002	135	2,011	2,004	7	14.9	14.9	0.1
2003	134	1,986	2,023	37	14.9	15.1	-0.3
2004	132	2,058	2,174	116	15.6	16.5	-0.9
2005	130	1,968	2,138	170	15.1	16.4	-1.3
2006	128	2,142	1,867	275	16.7	14.6	2.1
2007	127	2,433	1,653	780	19.1	13.0	6.1
2008	126	2,827	1,719	1,108	22.4	13.6	8.8
2009	126	2,906	1,648	1,258	23.1	13.1	10.0
2010	125	2,785	1,771	1,014	22.3	14.2	8.1

=== Ethnic groups ===
Of the 135,327 residents (as of the 2002 Census), 38 (0.02%) chose not to specify their ethnic background. Of the rest, residents identified themselves as belonging to 74 ethnic groups, including Russians (54.4%), Buryats (39.6%), Tatars (3%) and Ukrainians (0.96%)

Ethnic group	1959 Census		1970 Census		1979 Census		1989 Census		2002 Census		2010 Census		2020 Census	
Ethnic group	Number	%	Number	%	Number	%	Number	%	Number	%	Number	%	Number	%
Buryats	44,850	33.7%	48,302	33.0%	45,436	34.4%	49,298	36.3%	53,649	39.6%	49,871	39.8%	50,519	41.4%
Russians	75,099	56.4%	86,020	58.8%	76,731	58.1%	76,827	56.5%	73,646	54.4%	67,808	54.2%	66,587	54.5%
Others	13,122	9.9%	12,090	8.3%	9,986	7.6%	9,745	7.2%	8,032	5.9%	7,498	6.0%	4,961	4.1%

== See also ==
- Flag of Ust-Orda Buryat Okrug
