= Talovaya, Talovsky District, Voronezh Oblast =

Talovaya Таловая
- Urban-type settlement
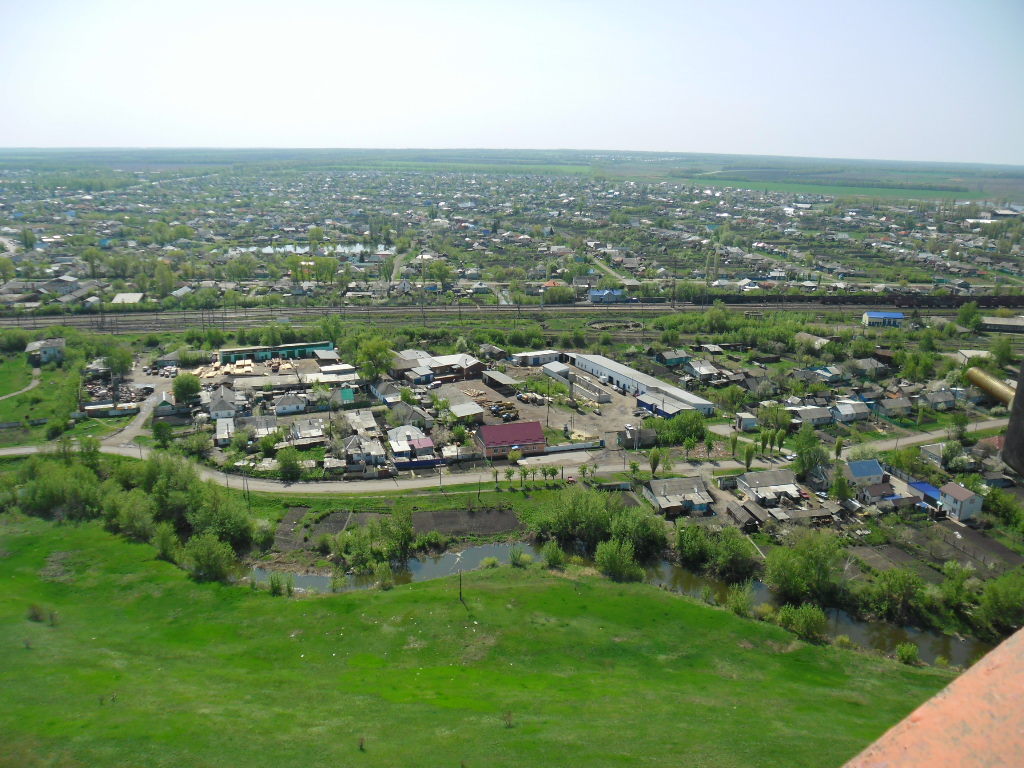
- View of Talovaya

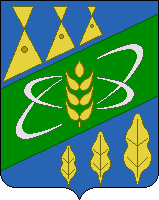
- Coat of arms
- Interactive map of Talovaya
- Location of Talovaya Talovaya (Voronezh Oblast)
- Coordinates: 51.1170°N 40.7285°E
- Country: Russia
- Federal subject: Voronezh Oblast
- Administrative district: Talovsky District

Population (2010 Census)
  - Total: 12,219
  - Estimate (2025): 10,815 (−11.5%)
- Time zone: UTC+3 (MSK)
- Postal code: 397480–397482
- OKTMO ID: 20651151051

Talovaya (Russian: Та́ловая) is an urban locality (an urban-type settlement) in Talovsky District of Voronezh Oblast, Russia. Population: 11,136 (2021 census); 12,219 (2010 census); 13,554 (2002 census); 13,990 (1989 Soviet census).
