= Talovsky District =

Talovsky District Таловский район (Russian)
- District
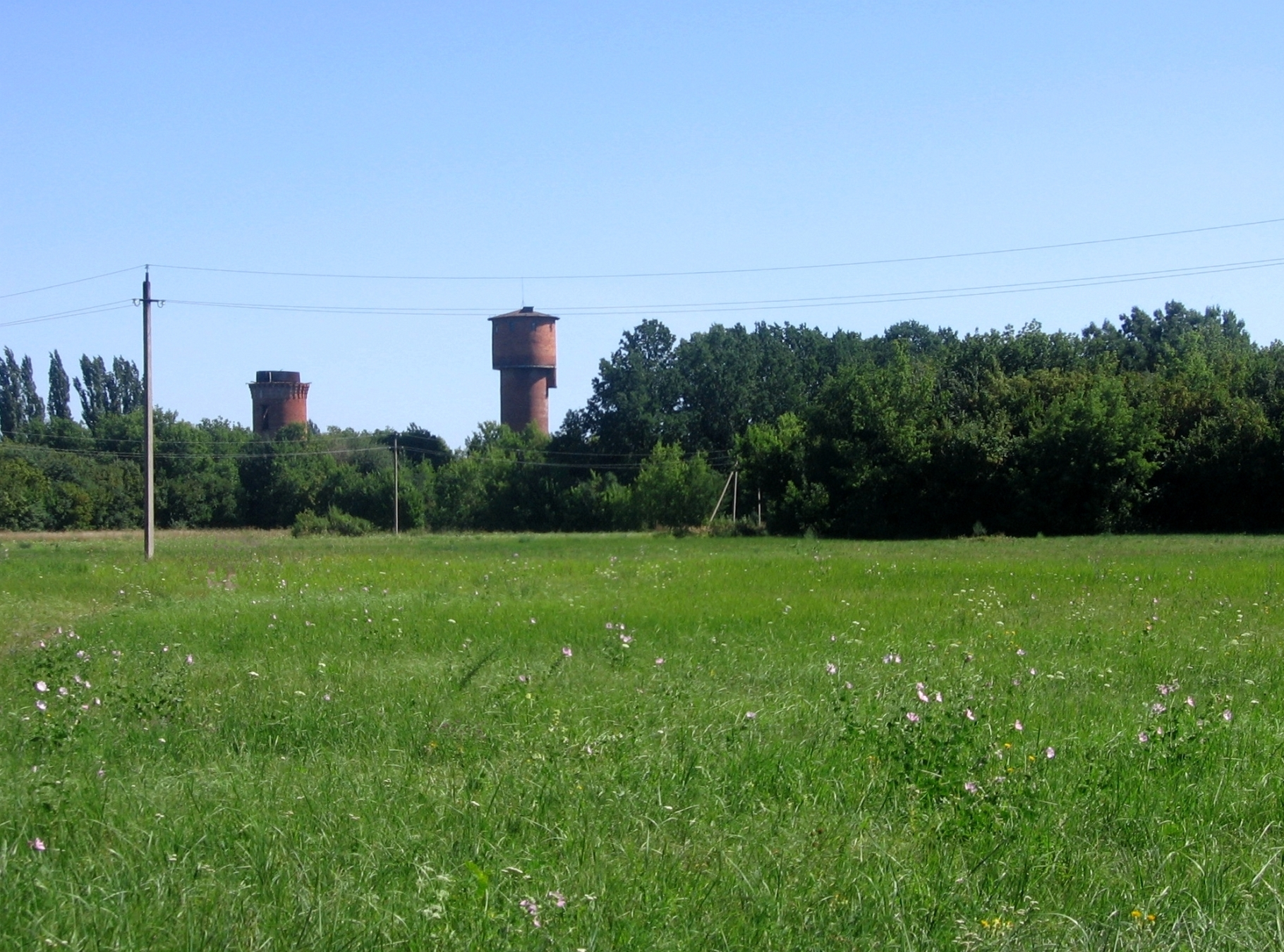
- Towers of Soil Research Station "Kamannyaya Steppe", Talovsky District

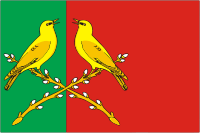
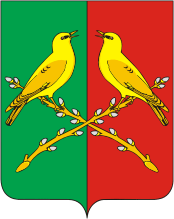
- Flag Coat of arms
- Location of Talovsky District in Voronezh Oblast
- Coordinates: 51°07′N 40°43′E
- Country: Russia
- Federal subject: Voronezh Oblast
- Established: 30 July 1928
- Administrative center: Talovaya

Area
  - Total: 1,910 km^{2} (740 sq mi)

Population (2010 Census)
  - Total: 42,603
  - Density: 22.3/km^{2} (57.8/sq mi)
  - Urban: 28.7%
  - Rural: 71.3%

Administrative structure
  - Administrative divisions: 1 Urban settlements, 23 Rural settlements
  - Inhabited localities: 1 urban-type settlements, 98 rural localities

Municipal structure
  - Municipally incorporated as: Talovsky Municipal District
  - Municipal divisions: 1 urban settlements, 23 rural settlements
- Time zone: UTC+3 (MSK)
- OKTMO ID: 20651000
- Website: http://taladm.ru/

Talovsky District (Russian: Та́ловский райо́н) is an administrative and municipal district (raion), one of the thirty-two in Voronezh Oblast, Russia. It is located in the northeastern central part of the oblast. The area of the district is 1,910 square kilometers (740 sq mi). Its administrative center is the urban locality (a work settlement) of Talovaya. Population: 35,173 (2021 census); 42,603 (2010 census); 47,221 (2002 census); 51,278 (1989 Soviet census). The population of Talovaya accounts for 31.7% of the district's total population.

The Russian Federal Nature Preserve Kamennaya Steppe is located in Talovsky District.
