= Chincheros (disambiguation) =

Chincheros can refer to a city, a district and a province in Peru.

For the use of the term in a specific setting, see:

- Chincheros for the town in Peru.
- Chincheros District for the district in the Chincheros province.
- Chincheros Province for the province in Apurímac.
