= Buryats =

Mongol ethnic group in Siberia, Mongolia, and Inner Mongolia

ᠪᠤᠷᠢᠶᠠᠳ буряад buryaad
- Flag of Buryatia

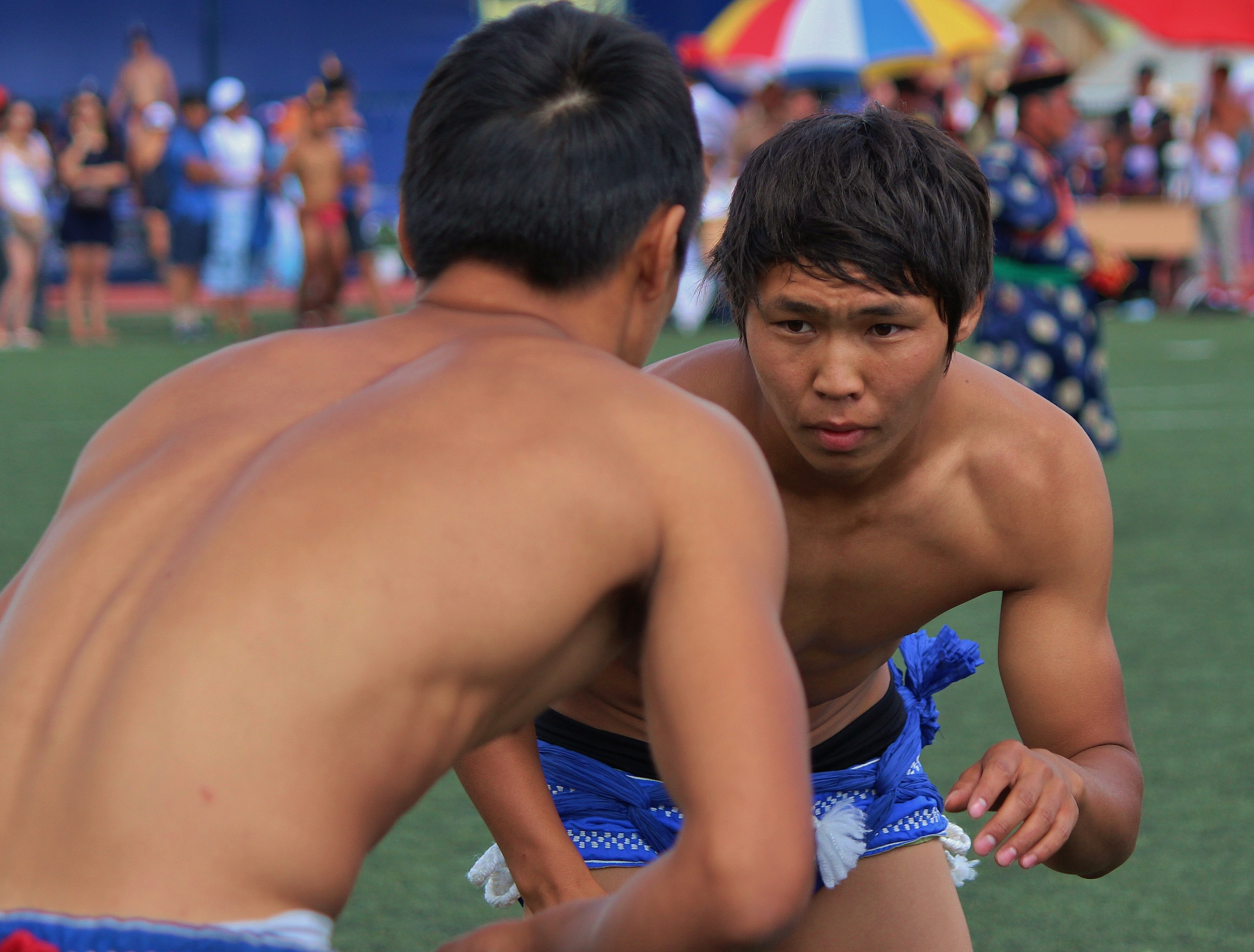
- A Buryat-Mongol wrestling match during the Altargana Festival

Total population
- 556,000

Regions with significant populations
- Russia: 460,053
- Buryatia: 295,273
- Irkutsk Oblast: 74,746
- Zabaykalsky Krai: 65,590
- China: 10,000-70,000
- Mongolia: 43,661

Languages
- Buryat (L1); Russian; Mongolian; Chinese

Religion
- Buddhism, Orthodox Christianity, Mongolian shamanism

Related ethnic groups
- Other Mongolic peoples and Indigenous peoples of Siberia

The Buryats (Note: /ˈbʊriæts/; Buryat: Буряад, romanized: Buryaad; Mongolian: ᠪᠣᠷᠢᠶᠠᠳ, romanized: Buriad; Russian: Буряты; Chinese: 布里亚特人) are a Mongol ethnic group indigenous to south‑eastern Siberia and northernmost Mongolia who speak the Buryat language or Buryat-Mongol dialect of Mongolian. They form one of the two principal indigenous groups in Siberia, the other being the Yakuts. The majority of Buryats today live in their titular homeland, the Republic of Buryatia, a federal subject of Russia that extends along the southern fringe of the country and partially straddles Lake Baikal. Smaller Buryat populations also inhabit Ust-Orda Buryat Okrug (Irkutsk Oblast) and the Agin-Buryat Autonomous Okrug (Zabaykalsky Krai), which lie to the west and east of Buryatia respectively, as well as north‑eastern Mongolia, and Inner Mongolia in China. Traditionally, they constituted the major northern subgroup of the Mongols.

The Buryats share many customs with other Mongolic peoples, among them nomadic herding and the use of gers for shelter. Today the majority of Buryats reside in and around Ulan-Ude, the capital of the Buryat Republic, though many still follow a more traditional way of life in the countryside. They speak a central Mongolic language called Buryat. UNESCO's 2010 edition of the Atlas of the World's Languages in Danger classifies the Buryat language as "severely endangered".

== History ==
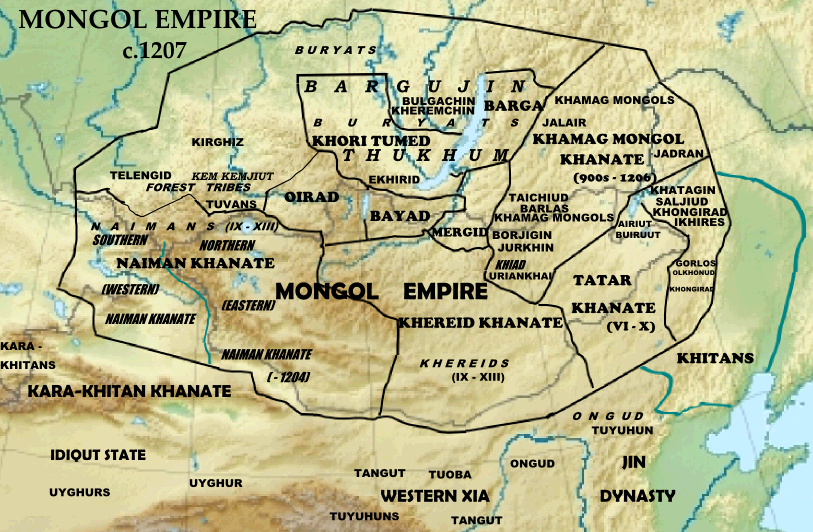
Mongol Empire c. 1207

The Buryat people were formed from a combination of Mongolic, Turkic, Tungusic and Samoyedic elements. The earliest inhabitants of the Baikal region are thought to have been Tungusic and Samoyedic tribes. The ethnogenesis of the Buryats is believed to have involved tribes such as the Bayirku and the Kurykans, who formed part of the Tiele tribal confederation. Alongside the Turkic hypothesis concerning the Bayyrku and the Kurykans, there are also theories that suggest they represented Mongolic elements within the Tiele union. The hypothesis of the Turkic origin of the Bayirku is shared by a number of scholars, among them N. A. Aristov, É. Chavannes, A. N. Bernshtam and B. R. Zoriktuev. The version proposing an ancient Mongolic origin for the Bayegu/Bayïrku was first advanced in detail by G. N. Rumyantsev, and was subsequently endorsed by scholars including Ts. B. Tsydendambaev, A. Ochir, P. B. Konovalov, S. B. Miyagasheva and G. Tubshinima. The Kurykans were regarded as Turkic‑speaking by P. Meliorsky, A. P. Okladnikov, S. E. Malov, S. A. Tokarev and B. O. Dolgikh. A Mongolic affiliation for the Kurykans has been proposed by V. V. Bartold, P. Pelliot, L. Hambis, Yu. D. Talko‑Gryntsevich, V. L. Kotwicz and A. N. Bernshtam, as well as by G. N. Rumyantsev and B. B. Dashibalov.

The name "Buriyad" is first recorded as that of one of the forest peoples in The Secret History of the Mongols (possibly 1240). It relates that Jochi, the eldest son of Genghis Khan, marched north in 1207 to subjugate the Buryats. At that time, the Buryats inhabited the region along the Angara River and its tributaries. A related group, the Barga, were found both west of Lake Baikal and in the Barguzin valley of northern Buryatia. The Khori‑Tumed, who dwelt along the Arig River in eastern Khövsgöl Province and along the Angara, were also linked to the Bargas. A rebellion of the Tumad broke out in 1217 after Genghis Khan permitted his viceroy to seize thirty Tumad maidens; in response, Genghis Khan's commander Dorbei the Fierce of the Dörbeds crushed them. During the Northern Yuan period in the late 14th century, the Buryats joined the Oirats in challenging the imperial rule of the Eastern Mongols.

Historically, the territories around Lake Baikal belonged to Mongolia, and the Buryats were subjects of the Tüsheet Khan and the Setsen Khan of Khalkha Mongolia. When the Russians expanded into Transbaikalia (eastern Siberia) in 1609, the Cossacks encountered only a small core of tribal groups speaking a Mongol dialect called Buryat and paying tribute to the Khalkha. Nevertheless, these groups were powerful enough to compel the Ket and Samoyedic peoples on the Kan River, as well as the Evenks on the lower Angara, to pay tribute. According to Bowles, the ancestors of most modern Buryats at that time spoke a variety of Turkic–Tungusic dialects. However, the Russian researcher Nanzatov argues that the Tungusic and Turkic groups then lived on the periphery of the Buryat area; they were small remnants later assimilated by the Buryat population. In addition to the core Buryat‑Mongol tribes (Bulagad, Khori, Ekhired, Khongoodor) that merged with the Buryats, the Buryats also assimilated other groups, including some Oirats, the Khalkha, Tungus (Evenks), and others. The Khori-Barga had migrated eastward out of the Barguzin to the lands between the Greater Khingan and the Argun River. Around 1594, most of them fled back to the Aga and Nerchinsk to avoid subjugation by the Daurs.

The Russians reached Lake Baikal in 1643, but the Buryats offered resistance to them and their forces. Although the Buryats were defeated, they attempted to revolt on several further occasions. These revolts were suppressed. The territory and its people were formally annexed to the Russian state by treaties in 1689 and 1727, when the lands on both sides of Lake Baikal were separated from Mongolia.

The consolidation of modern Buryat tribes and groups took place within the Russian state. From the mid‑17th century to the early 20th century, the Buryat population increased from 77,000 (estimates range from 27,700 to 60,000) to 300,000. Another estimate of the rapid growth in people identifying as Buryat is based on clan lists of those paying tribute in the form of a sable‑skin tax. These lists suggest a population of approximately 77,000 in 1640, rising to 157,000 in 1823, and exceeding one million by 1950.

The historical roots of Buryat culture lie with the Mongolic peoples. After Buryatia was incorporated into Russia, it was exposed to two traditions – Buddhism and Orthodox Christianity. The Buryats west of Lake Baikal and Olkhon (the Irkut Buryats) are more Russified; they soon abandoned nomadism for agriculture, whereas the eastern (Transbaikal) Buryats are closer to the Khalkha, may live in yurts, and are mostly Buddhists. In 1741, the Tibetan branch of Buddhism was recognised as one of the official religions of Russia, and the first Buryat datsan (Buddhist monastery) was built.

The second half of the 19th century and the beginning of the 20th century was a period of growth for the Buryat Buddhist religion (48 datsans in Buryatia by 1914). Buddhism became an important factor in the cultural development of the region. Owing to their skills in horsemanship and mounted combat, many Buryats were enlisted into the Amur Cossacks host. During the Russian Civil War, most Buryats sided with the White forces of Baron Ungern-Sternberg and Ataman Semenov. They formed a sizable portion of Ungern's forces and often received favourable treatment compared with other ethnic groups in the Baron's army. After the Revolution, most of the lamas remained loyal to Soviet power. In 1925, a campaign against religion and the clergy in Buryatia began. Datsans were gradually closed, and the activity of the clergy was curtailed. Consequently, by the late 1930s the Buddhist clergy had ceased to exist, and thousands of cultural treasures were destroyed. Attempts to revive Buddhism began during World War II, and it was officially re‑established in 1946. A revival of Buddhism has taken place since the late 1980s, becoming an important factor in national consolidation.

In the 1930s, Buryat‑Mongolia was one of the sites of Soviet studies aimed at disproving Nazi race theories. Among other things, Soviet physicians studied the "endurance and fatigue levels" of Russian, Buryat‑Mongol, and Russian‑Buryat‑Mongol workers to demonstrate that all three groups were equally capable.

In 1923, the Buryat-Mongol Autonomous Soviet Socialist Republic was formed and included the Baikal province (Pribaykalskaya guberniya), which had a Russian population. The Buryats rebelled against communist rule and the collectivisation of their herds in 1929. The rebellion was quickly crushed by the Red Army, with the loss of 35,000 Buryats. Buryat refugees fled to Mongolia and resettled there; however, only a few of them joined the Shambala rebellion in that country. In 1937, in an effort to disperse the Buryats, Stalin's government separated several counties (raions) from the Buryat-Mongol Autonomous Soviet Socialist Republic and formed the Ust-Orda Buryat Autonomous Okrug and the Agin-Buryat Autonomous Okrug; at the same time, some raions with Buryat populations were excluded. Fearing Buryat nationalism, Joseph Stalin had more than 10,000 Buryats killed. Moreover, the Stalinist purge of Buryats extended into Mongolia, an episode known as the incident of L'humbee.

In 1958, the name "Mongol" was removed from the name of the republic (becoming the Buryat ASSR). Also around 1958, the Mongolian script was banned and replaced by the Cyrillic alphabet. The BASSR declared its sovereignty in 1990 and adopted the name Republic of Buryatia in 1992. The constitution of the republic was adopted by the People's Khural in 1994, and a bilateral treaty with the Russian Federation was signed in 1995.

In the context of the Russian invasion of Ukraine since 2022, the Buryats have been reported as one of Russia's ethnic minority groups suffering from a disproportionally large casualty rate among Russian forces, reinforcing the processes of assimilation and Russification. Ethnic Buryats often enlist in the army because of financial reasons.

Settlement of Buryats in the Siberian Federal District (2010 census)

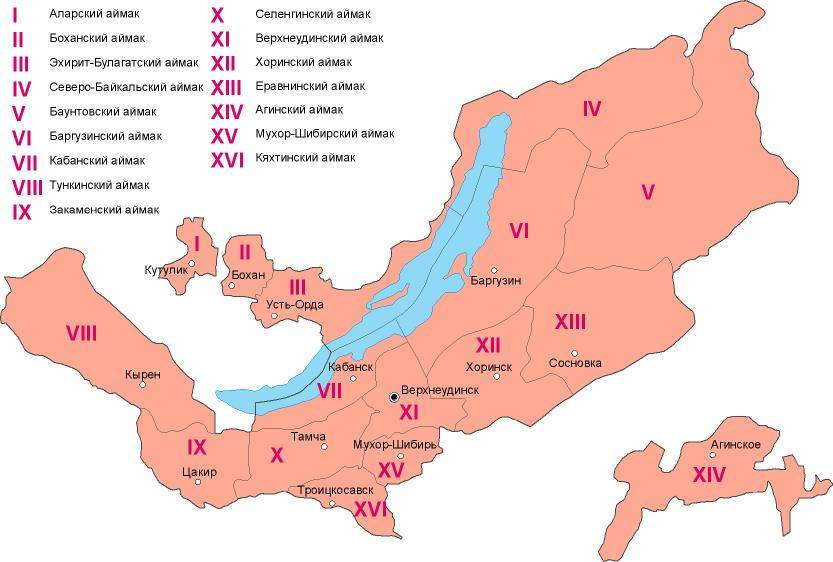
Buryat-Mongol Autonomous Soviet Socialist Republic in 1925

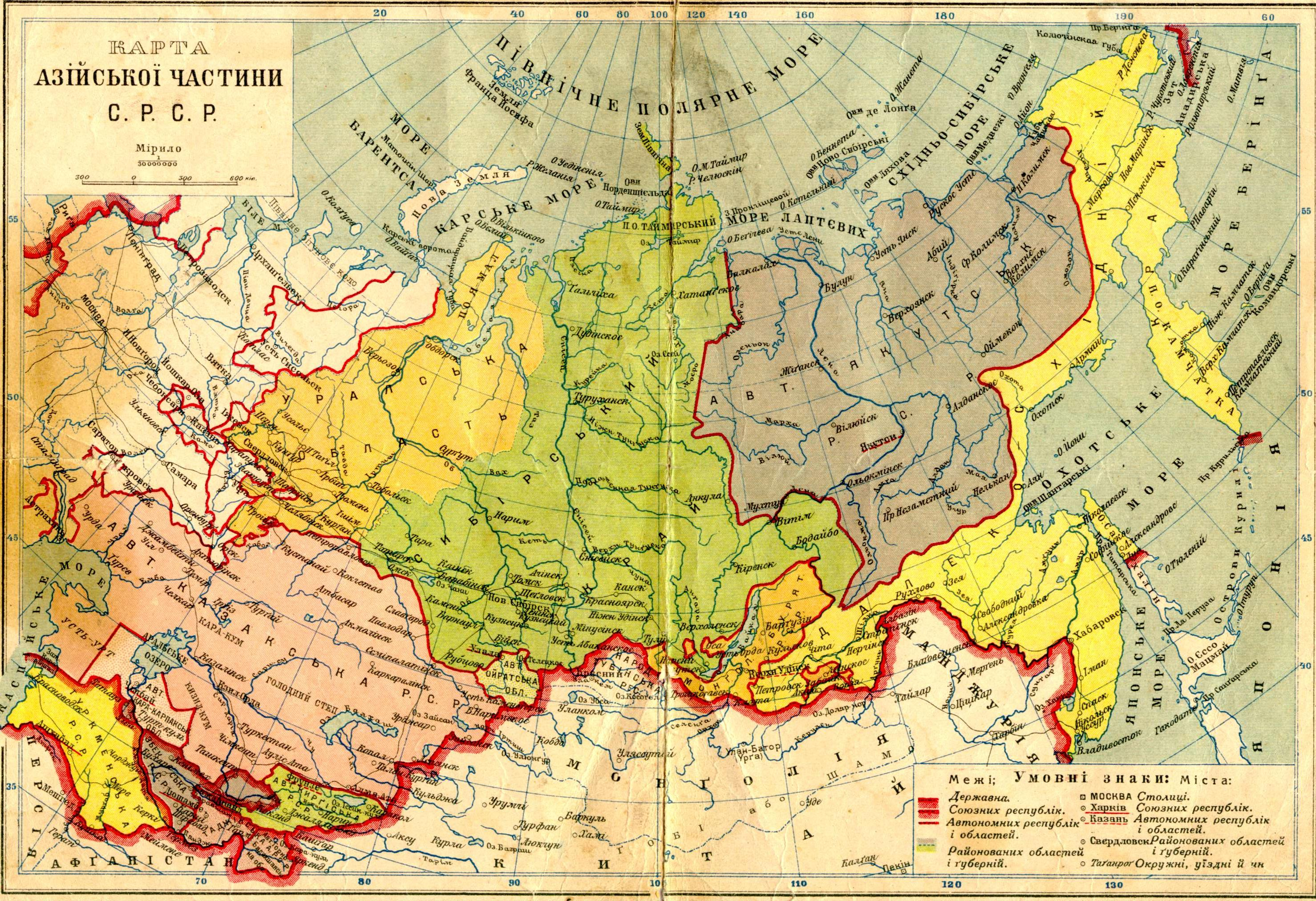
Buryat-Mongol ASSR in 1929

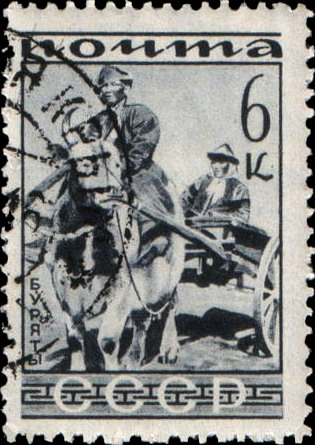
Buryats depicted on a 1933 "Peoples of the Soviet Union" stamp

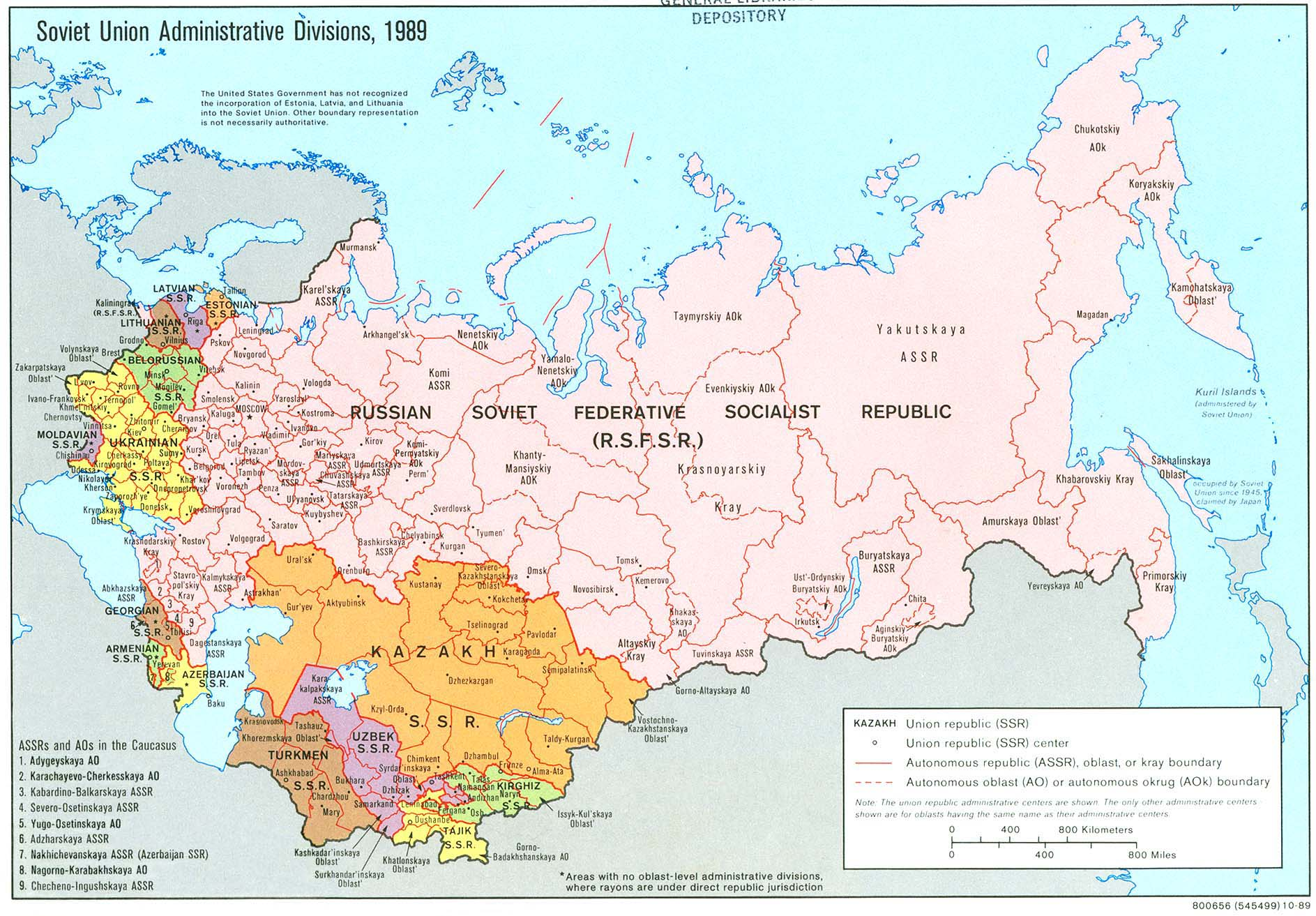
Buryat-Mongol ASSR in 1989

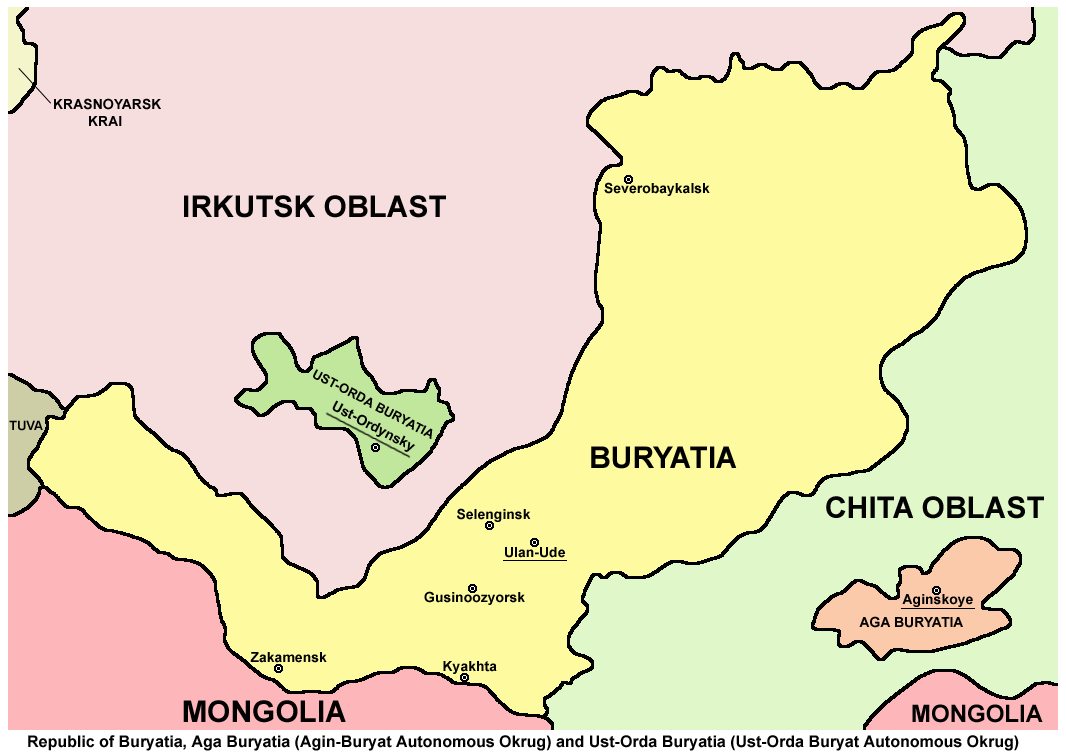
Map of autonomous Buryat territories (until 2008): Republic of Buryatia and autonomous okrugs of Aga Buryatia and Ust-Orda Buryatia

== Culture and traditions ==
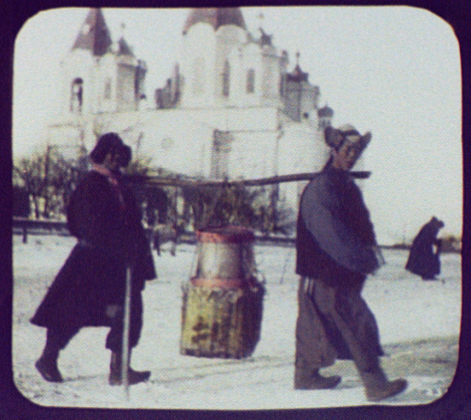
Two men of Buryatia carrying load on pole between their shoulders

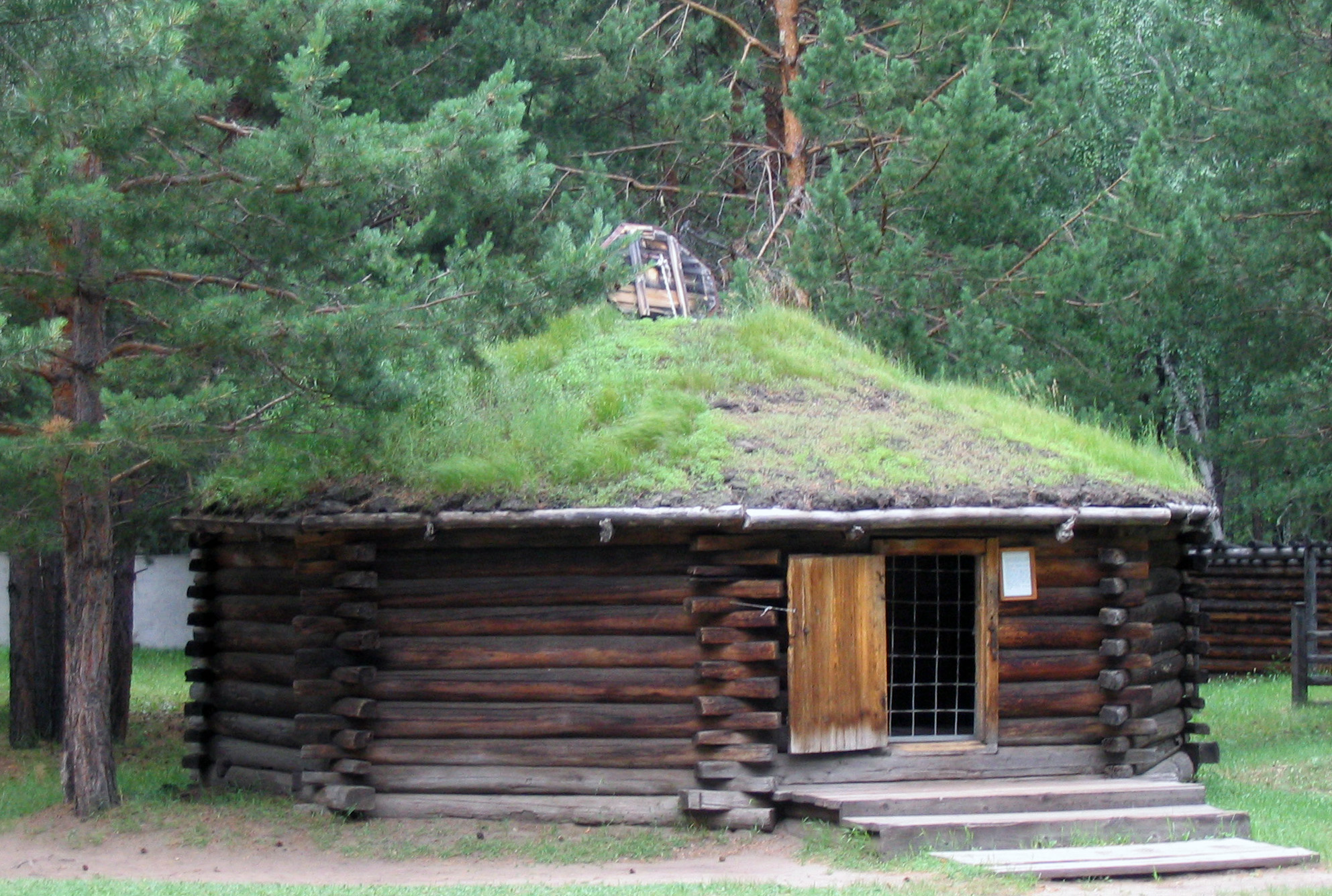
Traditional wooden hut of Buryatia

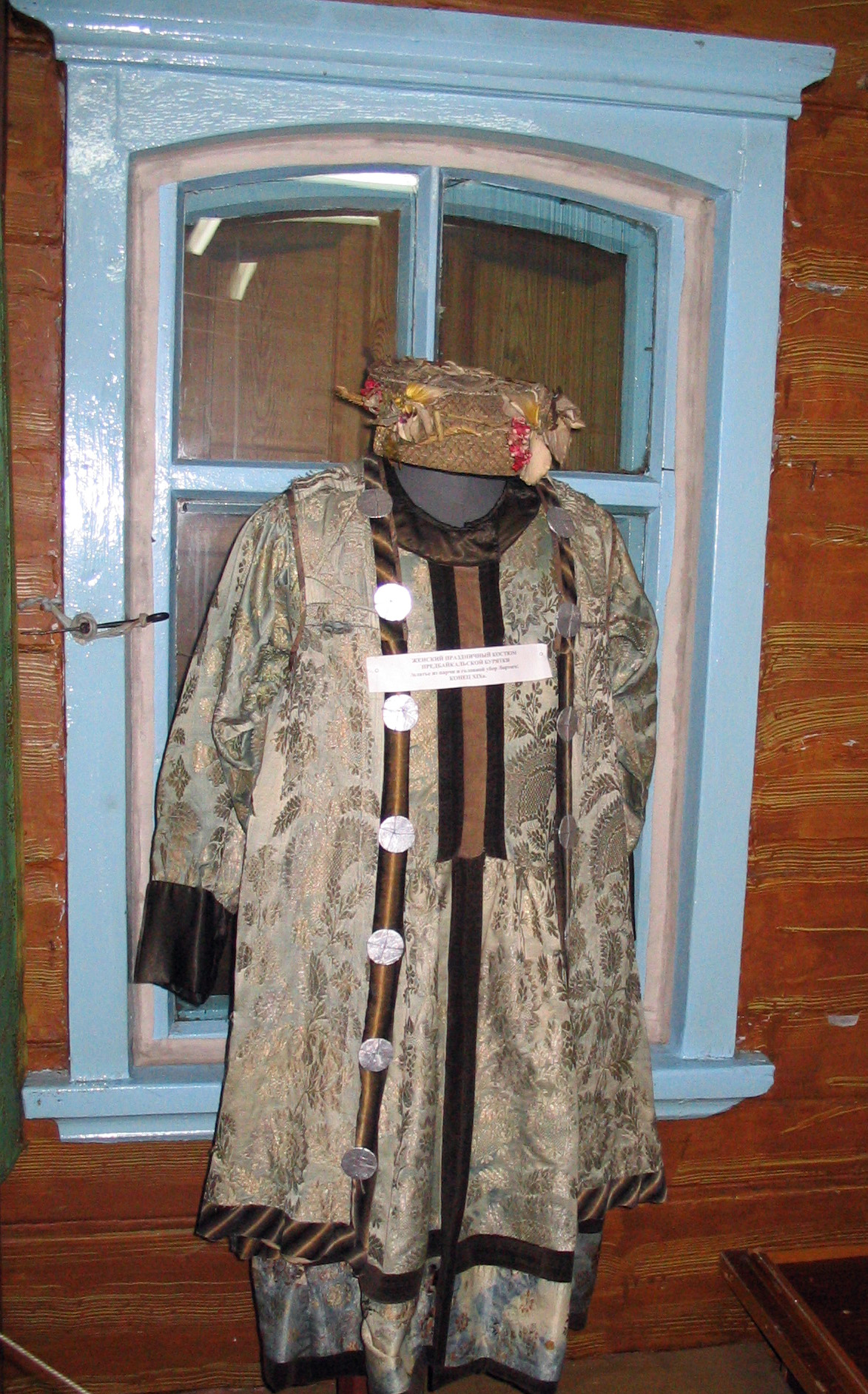
Traditional Buryat dress

=== Relationship with nature ===
Buryat national tradition is ecological in origin, as the religious and mythological ideas of the Buryat people are grounded in a theology of nature. The environment has traditionally been deeply respected by the Buryats owing to their nomadic way of life and religious culture. The harsh climatic conditions of the region have in turn created a fragile balance among humans, society and the environment itself. This has led to a delicate approach to nature, oriented not towards its conquest but rather towards harmonious interaction and equal partnership. A synthesis of Buddhism and traditional beliefs that formed a system of ecological traditions has thus become a major attribute of Buryat eco‑culture.

=== Kinship and marriage ===
Prior to the Russian advance, the Buryats lived in semi‑nomadic groups scattered across the steppes. Kinship was of paramount importance in Buryat society, both in spiritual and in social terms. All Buryats traced their lineage to a single mythical figure, although the particular ancestor varied according to geographical region. Kinship also determined physical proximity, since neighbours were almost invariably related. Groups of relatives who occupied the same pastureland organised themselves into clans on the basis of genealogy. Although coalitions between clans did occur, they were infrequent and commonly rested on looser interpretations of kinship and affinity.

Marriages were arranged by the family, sometimes when the parties were as young as one or two years of age. A distinctive feature of traditional Buryat marriage was the kalym, an exchange that embraced both bride‑wealth and a dowry. In the kalym arrangement, a husband delivered an agreed number of cattle in return for his bride, while the bride's kin furnished a dowry consisting of a yurt and the other essential household goods. If the prospective husband lacked sufficient cattle, a period of bride service would be set. Polygamy was permitted, but only men of considerable wealth could meet the cost of multiple wives. The marriage ceremony included rituals such as the bride stoking the fire in the groom's tent with three lumps of fat and sprinkling fat on the clothing of the groom's father.

The arrival of the Russians brought a radical transformation of the kalym system. Money became a prominent element of the exchange. As time passed, the price of a bride rose steeply, so that "in the 1890s, bride price involved '400 to 600 rubles' in addition to 86–107 head of livestock, when seventy years earlier only the wealthiest Western Buryats gave 100 head (of cattle)." As the burden grew heavier, many men entered multi‑year work contracts with wealthy herd‑owners, who in return undertook to help them obtain a wife. Subsequently, the kalym system fell into decline and was replaced by marriages founded on courtship and romantic attachment.

=== Religion ===
Religious affiliation in the Republic of Buryatia today is principally divided among Russian Orthodoxy, Buddhism and those professing no religion. Shamanism has undergone a revival in rural areas, although it remains small in scale. Those who practise it follow either Yellow shamanism, Black shamanism, or a combination of the two. Buddhism has likewise experienced a revival among the Buryats, with growth evident in the construction of monasteries, the training of monks and an increase in popular piety.

==== Shamanism (Tengrism) ====
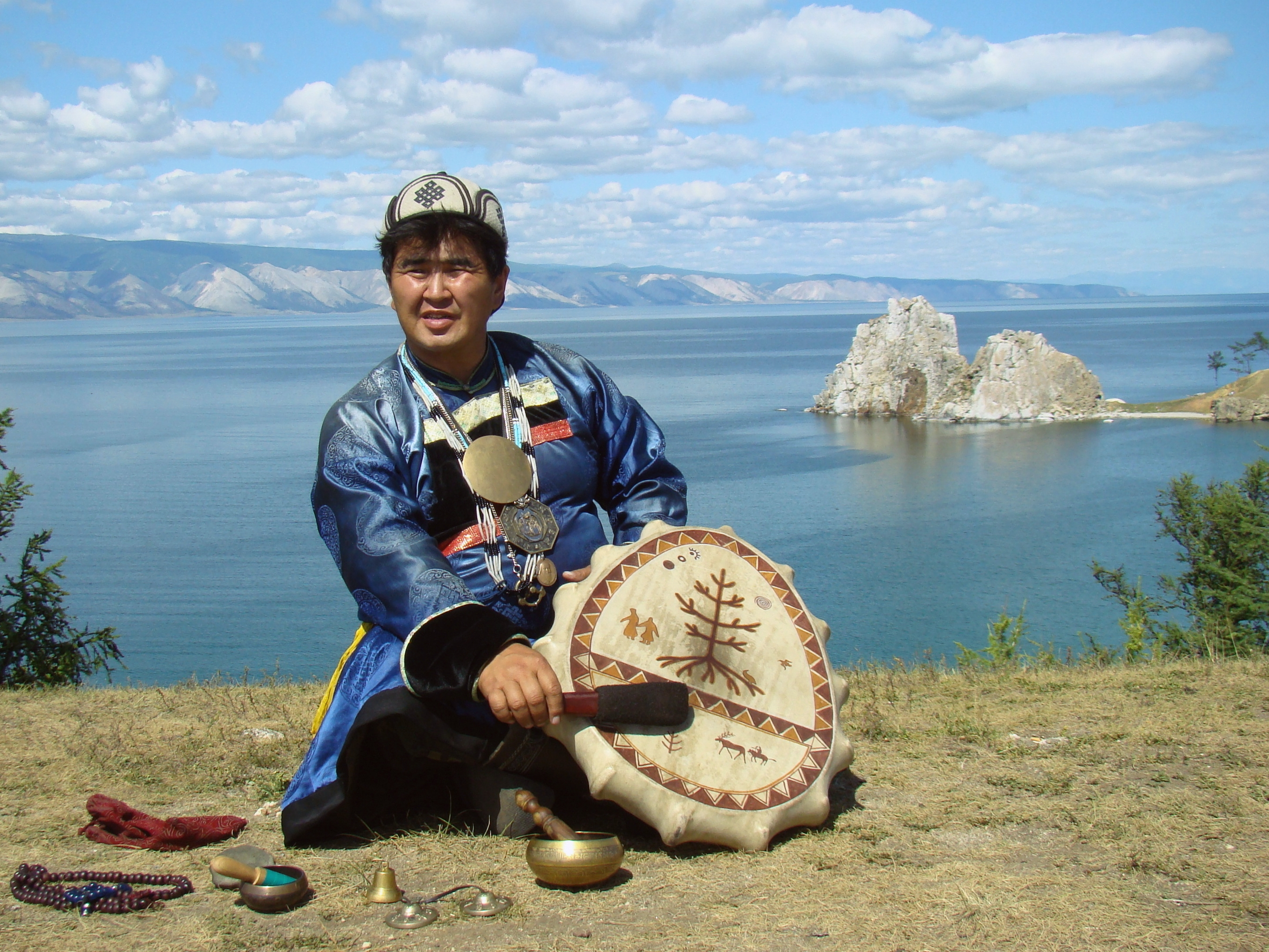
Buryat shaman of Olkhon, Lake Baikal

The Buryats traditionally practised shamanism, also referred to as Tengrism, with an emphasis on the worship of nature. A central concept of Buryat shamanism is the “triple division” of the physical and spiritual world. The spirit world is divided into three realms: the tengeri, the bōxoldoy, and the lower spirits. These correspond, respectively, to the supreme rulers of mankind, the spirits of commoners, and the spirits of slaves. Running in parallel to this is the belief that the human being is itself divided into three parts: the body (beye), the “breath and life”, and the soul. The soul is further subdivided into three: a first, a second, and a third soul. The first soul is held to reside within the entire physical skeleton, so that any injury to the bones harms the soul. For this reason, rituals that involve animal sacrifice take great care to avoid damaging the bones, lest the deity to whom the offering is made reject it. The second soul is believed to possess the power to leave the body, to transform into other beings, and to be stored in the organs. The third soul is similar to the second, differing only in that its departure marks the end of life.

The number three, together with its multiples, is held to be deeply sacred among the Buryats. Examples of this numerology include the three major annual sacrifices, the practice whereby shamans prolong the life of the sick by three or nine years, the total of 99 tengeri, and a great many other instances.

Shamans fall into two categories: “great” shamans of the Arctic regions and “little” shamans of the taiga. Shamans are often associated with nervous disorders, and in some cases are prone to seizures. A further division is between “White” shamans, who invoke benevolent spirits, and “Black” shamans, who call upon malevolent ones. Yellow shamanism denotes shamanistic practices that have been heavily influenced by Buddhism. The function of the shaman is to heal, particularly in cases of psychological illness. Buryat shamanism is not necessarily hereditary, and other members of the kin‑group may receive the calling; nevertheless, shamans do preserve records of their lineage, and a descendant is preferred. Shamans were capable of both controlling spirits and being controlled by them.

Beliefs and practices vary among different traditional groups, so that no single consensus exists. Western Buryats who dwell along the Kuda river, for example, hold a belief in the reincarnation of the third soul, very likely a consequence of their exposure to Buddhism.

==== Buddhism ====
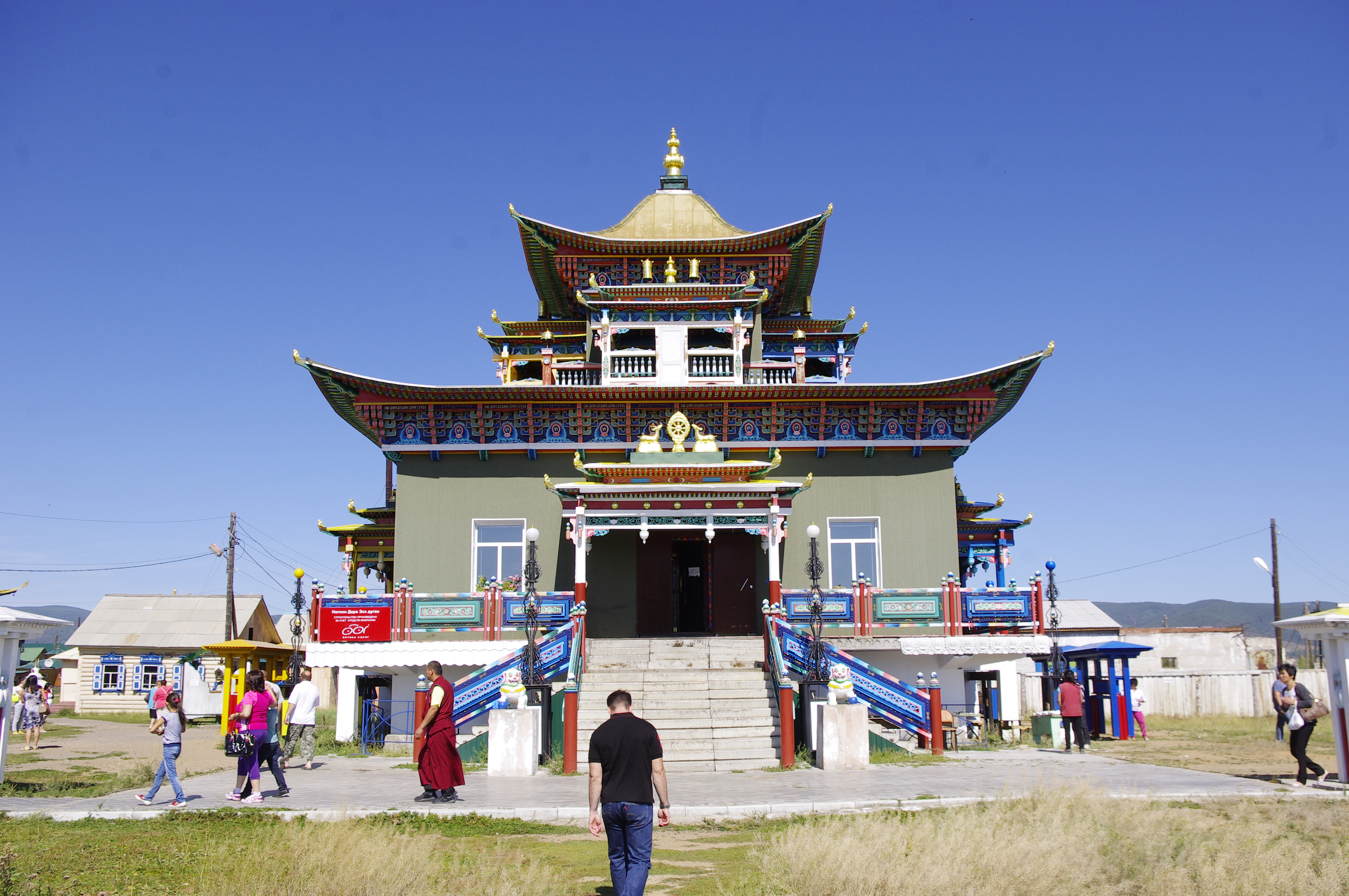
Ivolginsky Datsan is a monastery complex consisting of seven Buddhist temples

The majority of Buryats are adherents of Buddhism. They converted to Tibetan Buddhism in the early eighteenth century under the influence of Tibetan and Mongolian missionaries.

==== Other religions ====
A small minority of Buryats have converted to Christianity. The earliest Orthodox mission was established in Irkutsk in 1731. Some Buryats adopted the faith for material gain, while others were forcibly converted. Despite its presence in the region, Christianity is not regarded as a “Buryat” religion.

=== Subsistence ===
Traditionally, the Buryats were semi‑nomadic pastoralists. Buryat nomads tended herds of cattle, sheep, goats and camels, and they depended heavily on local resources to supplement their diet. Following Russian colonisation, pastoralism was steadily supplanted by agriculture. The majority of Buryats today pursue arable farming, yet most of those living in the countryside still concentrate on raising livestock as their principal means of subsistence.

The Buryats of Siberia continue to be largely pastoral, a consequence of the short growing season. They rely mainly on dairy cattle and the cultivation of berries to sustain their diet, and some communities also grow various species of trees as well as cash crops such as wheat and rye. On the slopes of the Sayan and Altai Mountains, there are communities whose way of life centres on breeding reindeer.

The Mongolian Buryats also farm, but they are typically semi‑sedentary. They construct sheds and fences to contain their livestock and use hay as the principal fodder. The Buryats of Buryatia, on the other hand, are more oriented towards arable cultivation than towards stock‑raising.

=== Traditional medicine ===
Buryat healing practices combine indigenous shamanic traditions with Tibeto‑Mongolian medicine. Before the adoption of Buddhism, the Buryats relied on shamanic rituals to halt or cure pain and illness, which were attributed to malevolent spirits. With the conversion to Tibetan Buddhism, they incorporated Tibetan medical practices into their healing repertoire. Medical schools were soon founded, where Buryat students studied diagnostic and prescription techniques and received training in both treatment and diagnosis. Buryats themselves soon contributed to the expansion of Tibeto‑Mongolian medical literature.

Traditional Buryat medicine places particular weight on the use of mineral and thermal springs for healing. A balanced diet, consisting of meat, offal, plants and herbs, together with sound nutrition, was prescribed to cure illness. The medicinal use of herbs was limited by the sparse vegetation of the semi‑deserts and dry steppes. Buryat healers were, nevertheless, regarded as skilled in wound treatment, the management of head trauma, midwifery and bone‑setting. In the modern era, a number of practices derived from Buryat folk medicine have been adopted in contemporary medical settings.

=== Cuisine ===
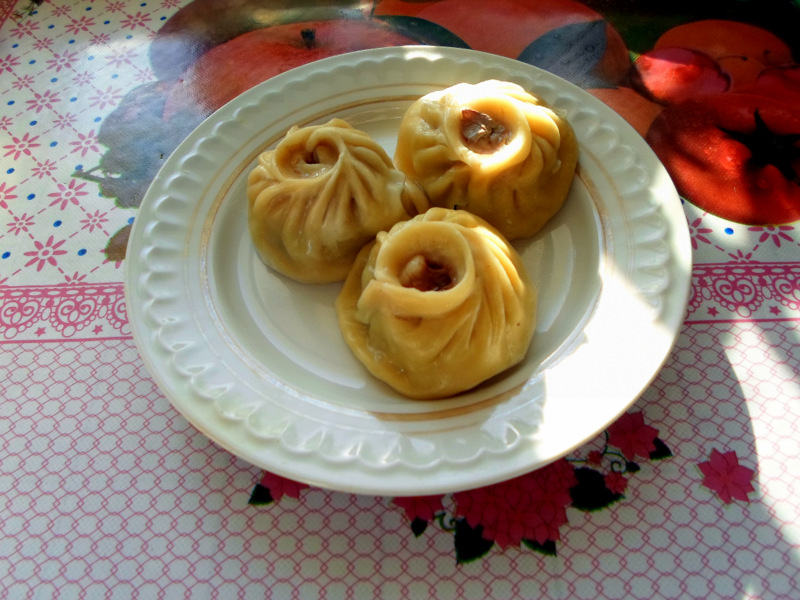
Buuz, a steamed meat dumpling, is probably the most iconic dish of Buryat cuisine

Buryat cuisine bears a close resemblance to Mongolian cuisine, with which it shares many dishes, among them buuz and khuushuur. Dairy products form a central part of the diet, and traditional dishes are generally hearty and plain. Most main courses are meat‑based, though fish such as omul is common, particularly in the region around Lake Baikal.

== Genetics ==
=== Mitochondrial DNA haplogroups ===
The Buryats possess a diverse array of mitochondrial DNA (mtDNA) lineages. Approximately 83.7% (247 out of 295) of their mtDNA belongs to haplogroups of Eastern Eurasian origin or affinity, while the remaining 16.3% (48 out of 295) is associated with Western Eurasian haplogroups. Among the Eastern Eurasian component, the most prevalent mtDNA haplogroups in contemporary Buryat populations are D4 (comprising roughly 29% of the total Buryat sample), C (approximately 16.6%), and G2a (about 11%). On the Western Eurasian side, the most frequently observed haplogroups are H (around 6.8%) and U (approximately 5.4%).

A separate mtDNA study focusing on Buryats found that 24% (6 out of 25) of their maternal lineages are of West Eurasian origin.

=== Y-chromosome DNA haplogroups ===
Lell et al. (2002) analysed a sample of thirteen Buryat males collected in the village of Kushun, Nizhneudinsk District, Irkutsk Region, representing the Buryat population of the Sayan–Baikal upland. The Y-chromosomes of these individuals were assigned to the following haplogroups: 6/13 (46.2%) O‑M119; 3/13 (23.1%) N‑Tat; 2/13 (15.4%) N‑DYS7Cdel(xTat); 1/13 (7.7%) C‑M48; and 1/13 (7.7%) F‑M89(xK‑M9). This sample completely lacks haplogroup C‑M407 and instead exhibits a high proportion of O‑M119. Consequently, it appears markedly different from published Y‑DNA samples collected from Buryats east of Lake Baikal.

Derenko et al. (2006) tested a sample of 238 Buryat males and found the following Y-DNA haplogroup distribution: 4/238 = 1.7% P*-92R7(xQ-DYS199/M3, R1-M173), 2/238 = 0.8% R1*-M173(xR1a-SRY1532b), 5/238 = 2.1% R1a1-M17, 3/238 = 1.3% N*-LLY22g(xTat), 45/238 = 18.9% N3-Tat, 152/238 = 63.9% C-RPS4Y/M130, 4/238 = 1.7% F*-M89(xG-M201, H-M52, I-M170, J-12f2, K-M9), 1/238 = 0.4% G-M201, 1/238 = 0.4% I-M170, 21/238 = 8.8% K*-M9(xL-M20, N-LLY22g, P-92R7). Boris Malyarchuk, Miroslava Derenko, Galina Denisova, et al. (2010) retested 217 of these 238 Buryats and found that they were 148/217 (68.2%) haplogroup C-RPS4Y711/M130, including 117/217 (53.9%) C3d-M407, 18/217 (8.3%) C3∗-M217(xC3a-M93, C3b-P39, C3c-M77, C3d-M407, C3e-P53.1, C3f-P62), and 13/217 (6.0%) C3c-M77. Fourteen of the 217 Buryats (6.5%) had STR haplotypes belonging to the "star cluster" in C3*, from which it might be inferred that they most likely belonged to C2a1a3-P369/M504.

Karafet et al. (2006) tested a sample of 81 Buryat males and found that they belonged to the following Y-DNA haplogroups: 45/81 = 55.6% C-M217(xM86), 4/81 = 4.9% C-M86, 1/81 = 1.2% G-M201, 1/81 = 1.2% J-12f2, 2/81 = 2.5% N-P43, 23/81 = 28.4% N-M178, 2/81 = 2.5% O-LINE, 3/81 = 3.7% R-M207. Karafet et al. (2018) retested the same sample of Buryat males (minus the G-M201 singleton) and found that they belonged to the following haplogroups: 4/80 = 5.0% C2a1a2a-M86, 5/80 = 6.3% C2a1a3-P369, 40/80 = 50.0% C2b1a1a1a-M407, 1/80 = 1.3% J2a1-P354(xJ2a1a-L27), 2/80 = 2.5% N1a2b1-P63(xP362), 23/80 = 28.8% N1a1a1a1a3a-P89, 2/80 = 2.5% O2a1b-JST002611, 1/80 = 1.3% R2a-M124, 1/80 = 1.3% R1a1a1b1a-Z282, 1/80 = 1.3% R1b1a1b1a1a2-P312(xL21).

Kim et al. (2011) reported the following Y-DNA haplogroup distribution in a sample of "Mongolians (Buryats)": 16/36 = 44.44% C2-M217, 1/36 = 2.78% D1a1a-M15, 1/36 = 2.78% F-M89(xK-M9), 9/36 = 25.00% N-M231, 1/36 = 2.78% O1b2-SRY465(x47z), 1/36 = 2.78% O2a-M324(xO2a1b-JST002611, O2a2-P201), 6/36 = 16.67% O2a2-P201, 1/36 = 2.78% R-M207.

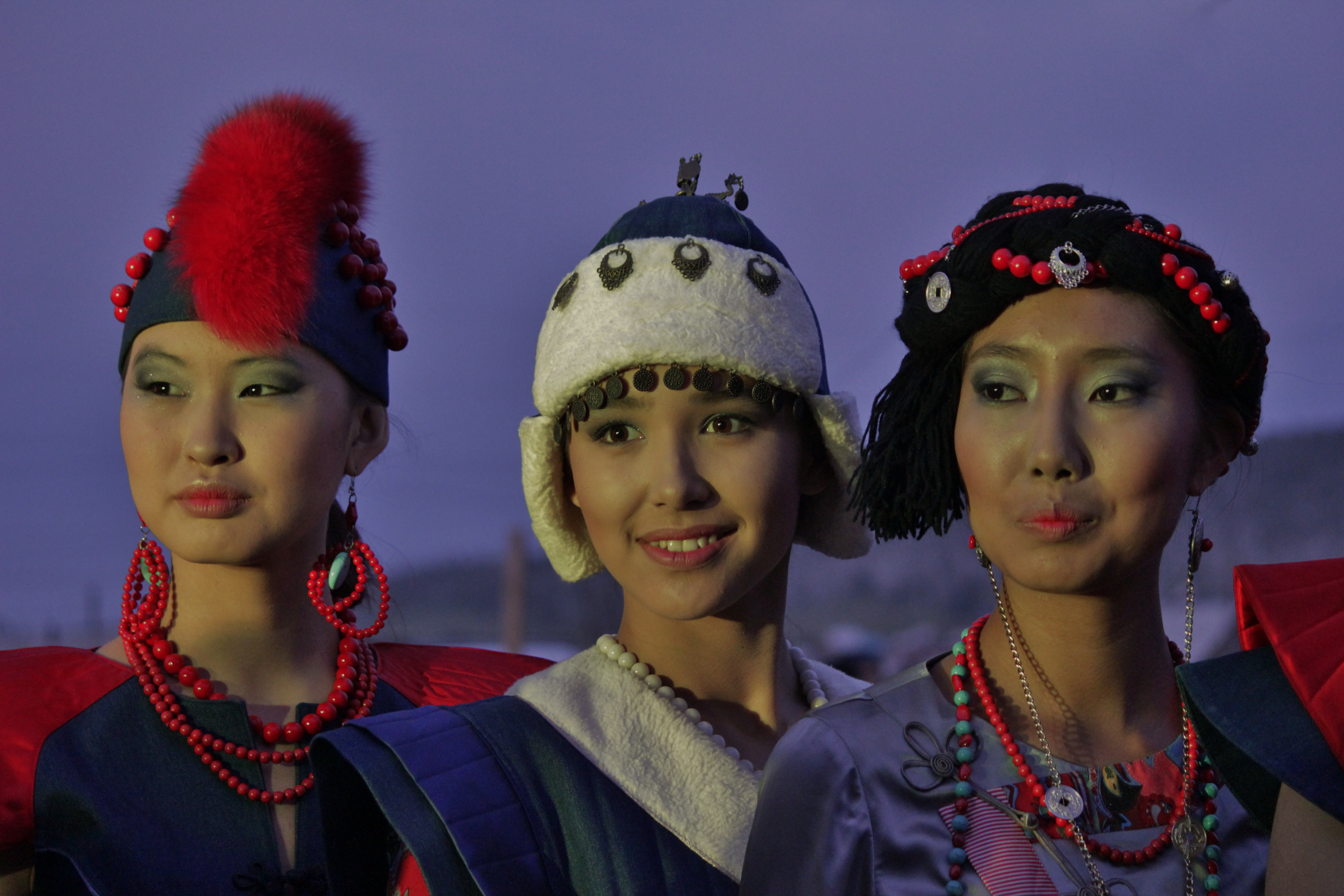
Buryat women

Kharkov et al. (2014) examined blood samples obtained from a total of 297 ethnic Buryats, separated into eight geographical groups according to the location of sample collection: Okinsky district (N = 53) (southwest of the Republic of Buryatia, ethnoterritorial group of Oka Buryats); Dzhida (N = 31) and Kyakhta (N = 27) (south, ethnoterritorial group of Selenga Buryats); the Kizhinga (N = 64) and Eravninsky (N = 30) regions (east, ethnoterritorial group of Khorin Buryats); Kurumkan village (N = 23) (north, ethnoterritorial group of Barguzin Buryats); Ulan-Ude and Khuramsha (30 km west of Ulan-Ude) (N = 26) (ethnoterritorial group of Kudarinsk Buryats); and Aginskoe village (N = 44) (Agin–Buryat Autonomous Region of Chita, Agin Buryats). For the statistical treatment, samples from Ulan-Ude and Khuramsha village were united into one group designated as "Ulan-Ude". The authors found significant differences among eastern Buryats (Khorin Buryats from Kizhinga and Eravninsky districts of Buryatia plus Agin Buryats from Agin-Buryat Okrug of Zabaykalsky Krai), southern and central Buryats (Selenga Buryats from Dzhida and Kyakhta plus Kudarinsk Buryats from Ulan-Ude and Khuramsha), and southwestern and northern Buryats (Oka Buryats from Okinsky district of Buryatia plus Barguzin Buryats from Kurumkan village). Similar to the Buryat samples examined by Malyarchuk et al. (2010) and Karafet et al. (2018), the southwestern and northern Buryat samples of Kharkov et al. (2014) exhibited an extremely high frequency of haplogroup C2-M407: 48/76 = 63.2% C3d-M407, 14/76 = 18.4% N1c1-Tat, 4/76 = 5.3% O3a3c*-M134(xM117), 3/76 = 3.9% C3*-M217(xM77, M86, M407), 2/76 = 2.6% C3c-M77/M86, 2/76 = 2.6% O3a3c1-M117, 2/76 = 2.6% R1a1a-M17, 1/76 = 1.3% N1b-P43. In contrast, the eastern Buryat samples of Kharkov et al. (2014) exhibited an extremely high frequency of haplogroup N-Tat: 102/138 = 73.9% N1c1-Tat, 19/138 = 13.8% C3d-M407, 5/138 = 3.6% C3c-M77/M86, 4/138 = 2.9% E, 3/138 = 2.2% C3*-M217(xM77, M86, M407), 2/138 = 1.4% R1a1a-M17, 1/138 = 0.7% O3a*-M324(xM7, M134), 1/138 = 0.7% O3a3c1-M117, 1/138 = 0.7% R2a-M124. The southern and central Buryat samples of Kharkov et al. (2014) exhibited a significant proportion of C3*-M217(xM77, M86, M407), which may be related to Y-DNA subclades that often have been observed among Mongols in Mongolia, while also exhibiting both N-Tat and C-M407 with moderate frequency: 26/84 = 31.0% N1c1-Tat, 19/84 = 22.6% C3d-M407, 16/84 = 19.0% C3*-M217(xM77, M86, M407), 8/84 = 9.5% R1a1a-M17, 7/84 = 8.3% R2a-M124, 4/84 = 4.8% C3c-M77/M86, 4/84 = 4.8% O3a*-M324(xM7, M134).

Haplogroup N-M178 is found mainly among the indigenous peoples of northern Eurasia (e.g. Yakuts, Sami). Among Buryats, haplogroup N-M178 is more common toward the east (cf. 50/64 = 78.2% N1c1 in a sample of Buryat from Kizhinginsky District, 34/44 = 77.3% N1c1 in a sample of Buryat from Aga Buryatia, and 18/30 = 60.0% N1c1 in a sample of Buryat from Yeravninsky District, every one of which regions is located at a substantial distance east of the eastern shore of the southern half of Lake Baikal, versus 6/31 = 19.4% N1c1 in a sample of Buryat from Dzhidinsky District, which is slightly south of the southwestern end of the lake, and 2/23 = 8.7% N1c1 in a sample of Buryat from Kurumkansky District, which is slightly east of the northeastern end of the lake), and it mostly belongs to a subclade (N-F4205) that reaches its maximal frequency among Buryats, but which also has been found in some other Mongolic peoples as well as in Siberian Tatars, Tsaatan, Tuvans, Kazakhstan, Uzbekistan, Ukraine, and Poland. N-F4205 is estimated to share a common ancestor with N-B202, which has been found in many present-day inhabitants of Chukotka, approximately 4,600 (95% CI 3,700 <-> 5,500) years before present.

Haplogroup C3d (M407) is found mainly among the northern and southwestern Buryats, Barghuts, Hamnigans, Soyots, Kazakh Khongirad, and Dörbet Kalmyks.

=== Nuclear DNA genetic history ===
A large-scale genetic study from 2021 shows that the Buryats, along with other Mongolic ethnic groups such as the Mongols, possess an almost exclusively East-Eurasian (East Asian-related) genetic ancestry, estimated at 95–98%. This ancestry can be largely traced back to Neolithic millet agriculturalists from Northeast Asia, as well as to Paleo-Siberian populations and to Yellow River farmers from the Yellow River region of northern China. Genetic evidence indicates that Northeast Asian–like ancestry expanded westward in several waves during the Bronze Age and Iron Age. Although the Buryats are genetically closer to their Mongolic and Tungusic-speaking neighbours than to other populations, among the major East Asian ethnic groups they are most closely related to Koreans, followed – in order of increasing genetic distance (as measured by FST statistics) – by Northern Han, Japanese, and Southern Han.

== Subgroups ==
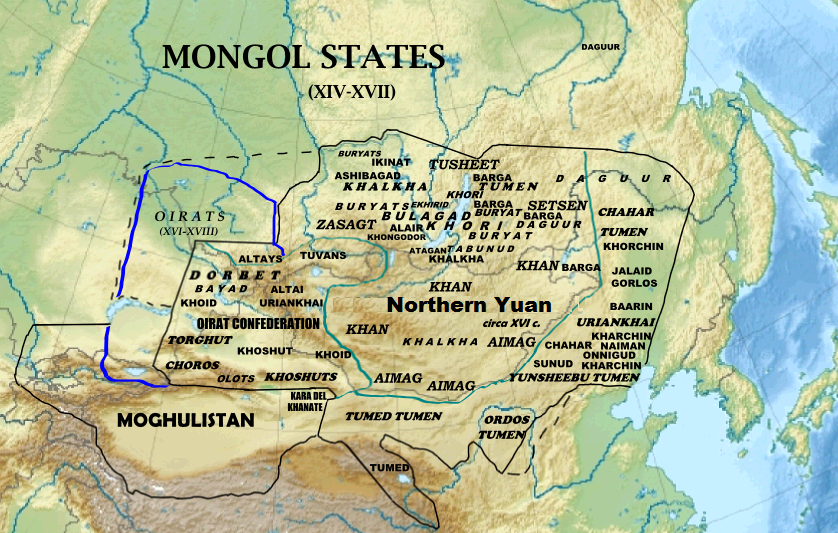
Mongol states in the 14th to 17th centuries

According to the Buryat creation myth, there were originally eleven Buryat tribes, or clans. The myth relates that all eleven are descended from a man and a mysterious, beautiful being who took the form of a swan by day and a woman by night. After the two were married, the man asked her to give him her wings so that she could no longer become a swan. It is said, however, that after some time the woman begged for the return of her wings and, upon receiving them, flew away, never to return. Today, a number of distinct Buryat tribes, or clans, still exist.

=== Major tribes ===
- Bulagad – Alagui, Gotol, Sharaldai, Bubai, Khogoi, Erkhidei, Kholtubai, Onkhotoi, Ongoy, Bulut, Barai, Yengut, Buin, Olzoy, Murui, Khulmenge, Khurkhut, Soyot, Noyot, Kharanut, Ashabagat, Abaganat, Buzgan, Dalakhai.
- Khongodor – Ashkhai, Ashata, Kholsho, Uta-Baima, Dasha, Naidar, Nashan, Badarkhan, Boldoy, Terte, Shoshoolog.
- Khori-Buryats – Galzut, Sharait, Khubduut, Gushit, Khuatsai, Khargana, Batanai, Bodonguut, Khudai, Sagaan, Khalbin.
- Ekhirid – Shono, Khengelder, Abzay, Bayanday, Olzon, Segenut, Galzut, Kharbyat, Khaital.
- Sartuul Buryats – Khorchin, Khirid, Khatagin, Saljiud, Batod, Atagan, Khorlid, Onkhod, Khoit, Uriankhai, Khereit.
- Songol

=== Other tribes ===
- Dzungar origin – Galzut, Segenut, Ikinat, Bukot, Zamot, Khaital, Zungar, Khuramsha.
- Atagan
- Khamnigan Buryats
- Darkhat
- Khangin
- Khorchin

== Notable people ==
- Valéry Inkijinoff, French actor
- Balzhinima Tsyrempilov, Russian archer
- Yuriy Yekhanurov, former Prime Minister of Ukraine
- Agvan Dorjiev, Buddhist monk, tutor of the 13th Dalai Lama
- Dashi Namdakov, sculptor
- Irina Pantaeva, model
- Yul Brynner, actor
- Ōrora Satoshi, sumo wrestler
- Rōga Tokiyoshi, sumo wrestler (half Buryat)
- Dorzhi Banzarov, academic
- Grigory Mikhaylovich Semyonov, Cossack ataman.
- Damba Ayusheev, Russian Buddhist monk

== See also ==
- Buddhism in Russia
- Far Eastern Republic
- List of indigenous peoples of Russia
- Shamanism in Siberia
- Buryat nationalism
