= Hugo Carrillo =

Quechua poet, singer-songwriter, anthropologist and Peruvian politician

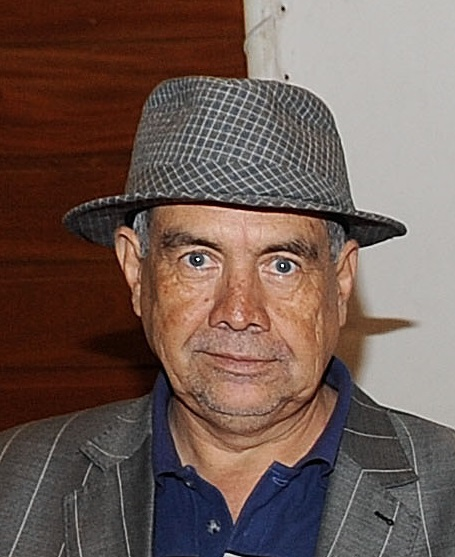
- Former Congressman Carrillo in 2012

Member of Congress
- In office July 26, 2011 – July 26, 2016
- Constituency: Huancavelia

Personal details
- Born: Hugo Carrillo Cavero; 30 October 1956 (age 69) Anco-Huallo, Chincheros, Apurímac, Peru
- Party: Peruvian Nationalist Party
- Occupation: Politician
- Profession: Singer

Hugo Carrillo Cavero, also Ugo Facundo Carrillo (born October 30, 1956) is a Quechua poet, singer-songwriter, singer, anthropologist and Peruvian politician, congressman for the department from Huancavelica, and belongs to Peru Wins.

== Biography ==
Carrillo was born in the Uripa community in the Anco-Huallo district, Apurímac. He completed his secondary studies at the national educational institution Juan Espinoza Medrano, and his university studies at the Universidad Nacional Mayor de San Marcos in the career of anthropology. It was received in 1982.

Carrillo is the author of several Quechua songs and poems that he published in the poetry books Yaku unupa yuyaynin (2009) and Puyupa wayrapa ninapawan musqukusqanmanta (2010).
