= Sanctuary of Our Lady of Cocharcas =

Church in Apurímac, Peru

Coordinates: 13°36′36″S 73°44′25″W

- Sanctuary of Our Lady of Cocharcas
- Country: Peru
- Denomination: Roman Catholic

Architecture
- Style: Baroque
- Years built: 1598–1623

Administration
- Diocese: Abancay

The Sanctuary of Our Lady of Cocharcas (Spanish: Santuario de Nuestra Señora de Cocharcas) is a Catholic temple dedicated to the Marian devotion of Our Lady of Cocharcas. It is located in the town of Cocharcas, capital of the homonymous district located in the province of Chincheros of the department of Apurímac.

The temple was built between 1598 and 1623. It was declared Cultural Heritage of the Nation.

== Overview ==
The construction is in the baroque style. It was built with carved ashlar stone. It consists of two towers, a semicircular vault and a masonry dome covered with glazed tiles. Inside it houses canvases from the Cusco School and some Spanish masters. The main altar has ornaments carved in gold leaf.

== Our Lady of Cocharcas ==
The Virgin of Cocharcas (Spanish: Virgen de Cocharcas) or Our Lady of Cocharcas (Spanish: Santuario de Nuestra Señora de Cocharcas) is a Marian devotion typical of the town of Cocharcas. Her effigy is one of the most venerated in the country and her cult formed at the end of the 16th century led to the construction of the sanctuary, one of the first Marian sanctuaries in South America and an important pilgrimage site. The replica of her in the town of Sapallanga in Huancayo Province, originated the local cult of her with the name of Virgin of Sapallanga (Spanish: Virgen de Sapallanga).

== See also ==
- Roman Catholic Diocese of Abancay
