= Ongoy District =

Coordinates: 13°24′14″S 73°40′12″W

Ongoy Unquy
- District
- Interactive map of Ongoy; Unquy
- Country: Peru
- Region: Apurímac
- Province: Chincheros
- Capital: Ongoy

Government
  - Mayor: Edwin Acosta Ccahuana

Area
  - Total: 237.56 km^{2} (91.72 sq mi)
- Elevation: 2,768 m (9,081 ft)

Population (2005 census)
  - Total: 8,518
  - Density: 35.86/km^{2} (92.87/sq mi)
- Time zone: UTC-5 (PET)
- UBIGEO: 030606

Ongoy District is one of the eight districts of the province Chincheros in Peru.

== Ethnic groups ==
The people in the district are mainly indigenous citizens of Quechua descent. Quechua is the language which the majority of the population (92.31%) learnt to speak in childhood, 6.76% of the residents started speaking using the Spanish language (2007 Peru Census).
