= Ocobamba District =

Ocobamba District may refer to:

- Ocobamba District, Chincheros
- Ocobamba District, La Convención
