= 2022–2023 Apurímac protests =

Conflict in central Peru

- Part of the 2022–2023 Peruvian political protests
- Date: 10 December 2022 – 16 February 2023
- Location: Department of Apurímac, Peru
- Caused by: Impeachment and subsequent arrest of Pedro Castillo after the self-coup attempt.
- Goals: Resignation of President Dina Boluarte and Government of Peru; Dissolution of Congress; Establishment of a constituent constitutional assembly; New general election
- Methods: Blockades; Labor strike; Riots; Insurgency

Parties
(Peru) Pro-Castillo protestors	Government of Peru; National Police; Armed Forces

Casualties
- Deaths: 6 (14 December)
- Injuries: 67 (14 December)

The 2022–2023 Apurímac protests corresponds to a series of protests and violent confrontations that began on 10 December 2022 in the department of Apurímac in the context of the December 2022 Peruvian protests. The protesters demand the resignation of President Dina Boluarte, the closure of the Congress of the Republic, and new general elections. Unlike the protests in other regions and cities, in Apurímac the confrontations are more violent, and criminal acts have been recorded, such as the kidnapping of police officers and attacks on police stations. The Boluarte government declared a state of emergency, removing some constitutional protections from citizens, including the rights preventing troops from staying within private homes and buildings, freedom of movement, freedom of assembly and "personal freedom and security".

== Background ==
On 7 December 2022, President Pedro Castillo attempted to dissolve the Congress of the Republic, but without the support of the Peruvian Armed Forces and the National Police of Peru (PNP), his self-coup had no effect. Immediately after the congressional session ended, the police seized him. Since that day, supporters of the former president have called for marches and protests at the national level, beginning in Lima. However, as the days went by, the protests intensified, and the population joined the mobilizations demanding the closure of the congress, the resignation of President Dina Boluarte and new elections.

On December 8, a self-convocation was published under the name Great Chanka Nation.

== Protests ==
Although the demonstrations were promoted by defense fronts such as the Apurímac Interests Defense and Development Front, on 10 December, in Andahuaylas, a city in the department of Apurímac, there were violent clashes between demonstrators and police officers. With three thousand people participating, during the afternoon, the protesters took two policemen hostage and requested an "exchange of prisoners", before this, a division of special forces of the PNP stationed in Abancay mobilized towards Andahuaylas in a plane. Hours after the kidnappings, the protesters released the police officers and numerous social organizations from the department of Apurimac declared themselves in a "popular insurgency" and began a regional strike starting on Monday, 12 December. According to the president of the Chamber of Commerce of this region, daily losses of six million soles are estimated, mainly obtained from mining.

Due to the clashes on the first day, 20 civilians and 10 police officers were injured. With the new confrontations at the headquarters of the Andahuaylas Police Division and at the Huancabamba airport, the protesters managed to vandalize the area, from burning tires to damaging stores in the latter. It is estimated that 50 members of the PNP and collaborators are in those facilities.

Message to the Nation from the President of the Republic, Dina Boluarte, dated December 11, where, among other things, she announced her intention to advance the general elections and declared a state of emergency in various areas of the country.

On December 11, new riots broke out, causing clashes between citizens and the PNP to became increasingly violent. Given this, the Regional Government of Apurímac announced the indefinite suspension of classes at all educational levels and alerted all institutions to work under the virtual modality throughout the department, with the exception of the health sector. During the day, the protesters took over the Huancabamba airport and detained more than 50 people (including workers and police) while also causing destruction at various points in the airport facilities, including the runway.

After the seizure of the airport, the police, finding themselves outnumbered, responded with numerous pellets and live ammunition to the demonstrators. A helicopter even arrived in the area to reinforce the police officers, with police in the helicopter firing upon protesters, killing two. Due to these clashes, more than 30 others were injured (between demonstrators and police). Protesters, after learning of the death of two of their companions, set fire to the Huancabamba police station.

== Insurgency ==
On 12 December, the indefinite strike began in the department of Apurímac. During the morning, President Dina Boluarte declared a state of emergency throughout the department for 60 days, along with those of Ica and Arequipa. During the state of emergency, the Boluarte government removed some constitutional protections from citizens; the rights preventing troops from staying within private homes and buildings, freedom of movement, freedom of assembly and "personal freedom and security".

The protesters besieged and stoned the Chincheros police station, retaining 30 policemen who were protecting it. They burned down the prosecutor's office and managed to kidnap another policeman to expose him to the public, who was paraded around the city as a "trophy", beaten and then abandoned.

It was further reported that the police used rifles and snipers, not just pellets and tear gas. During the day, four more people died from the clashes. It was recorded that the protesters were using homemade fireworks and explosives to attack the policemen, 15 of them were injured by an explosion.

With the dismissal measures of all the prefects at the national level, the then representative of that entity, Eliseo Huamaní Curihuamaní, resigned his position two days later, on 14 December. Huamaní expressed his loyalty to Pedro Castillo.

On 13 December, in Abancay, protesters attacked the headquarters of the Prosecutor's Office and the Superior Court of Justice. For that day, the aforementioned capital city fully complied with the strike.

On 14 December, sales of products were made during reduced hours, from 5 to 8 in the morning, by agreement between its leaders.

On 15 December, demonstrators walked through the streets with the coffin of 19-year-old Cristian Rojas, who died as a result of clashes.

== Impact ==
=== Deaths ===
As of 14 December, 6 civilians were killed in the clashes in the department.

=== Injuries ===
More than 32 civilians and 35 police officers injured have been reported.

=== Economic losses ===
According to the president of the Chamber of Commerce of the Apurímac region, daily losses of six million soles were estimated, mainly obtained from mining.

== Reactions ==
- The Apurímac Regional Council blamed the Congress of the Republic for the victims of the insurgency, in addition to ignoring the declaration of emergency in their department.

== See also ==
- Andahuaylazo
