= Cocharcas District =

Coordinates: 13°36′40″S 73°44′24″W

Cocharcas
- District
- The Sanctuary of Our Lady of Cocharcas
- Interactive map of Cocharcas
- Country: Peru
- Region: Apurímac
- Province: Chincheros
- Capital: Cocharcas

Government
  - Mayor: Silverio Florentino Valer Pizarro

Area
  - Total: 109.9 km^{2} (42.4 sq mi)
- Elevation: 3,030 m (9,940 ft)

Population (2005 census)
  - Total: 2,219
  - Density: 20.19/km^{2} (52.29/sq mi)
- Time zone: UTC-5 (PET)
- UBIGEO: 030603

Cocharcas District is one of the eight districts of the province Chincheros in Peru.

== Ethnic groups ==
The people in the district are mainly indigenous citizens of Quechua descent. Quechua is the language which the majority of the population (86.25%) learnt to speak in childhood, 13.13% of the residents started speaking using the Spanish language (2007 Peru Census).

== History ==
Cocharcas District was created by Law No. 8422 on 15 July 1936, with the town of Cocharcas designated as its capital. At the time of its creation, the district formed part of Andahuaylas Province. It became part of Chincheros Province after that province was established in 1983.

== Population and culture ==
The district has a predominantly Quechua population. According to data compiled by Peru's Ministry of Culture, approximately 85% of residents of the Cocharcas community aged over three had an Indigenous language as their mother tongue.

== Landmarks ==
The district is home to the Sanctuary of Cocharcas, a colonial religious complex whose construction took place in several stages between 1598 and 1680. The sanctuary was declared an artistic monument in 1941 and remains an important centre of pilgrimage associated with devotion to the Virgin of Cocharcas.
