= Uranmarca District =

Coordinates: 13°30′31″S 73°43′24″W

Uranmarca Uranmarka
- District
- Interactive map of Uranmarca; Uranmarka
- Country: Peru
- Region: Apurímac
- Province: Chincheros
- Founded: November 19, 1985
- Capital: Uranmarca

Government
  - Mayor: Jorge Yepez Melendez

Area
  - Total: 148.73 km^{2} (57.42 sq mi)
- Elevation: 3,100 m (10,200 ft)

Population (2005 census)
  - Total: 3,258
  - Density: 21.91/km^{2} (56.73/sq mi)
- Time zone: UTC-5 (PET)
- UBIGEO: 030607

Uranmarca District is one of the eight districts of the province Chincheros in Peru.

== Ethnic groups ==
The people in the district are mainly indigenous citizens of Quechua descent. Quechua is the language which the majority of the population (86.77%) learnt to speak in childhood, 12.84% of the residents started speaking using the Spanish language (2007 Peru Census).

== See also ==
- Muyu Muyu
- Wisk'achayuq
