= Huaccana District =

Coordinates: 13°23′15″S 73°41′23″W

Huaccana
- District
- Interactive map of Huaccana
- Country: Peru
- Region: Apurímac
- Province: Chincheros
- Founded: June 12, 1985
- Capital: Huaccana

Government
  - Mayor: Demetrio Najardemetrio Najarro Salazar

Area
  - Total: 472.12 km^{2} (182.29 sq mi)
- Elevation: 3,075 m (10,089 ft)

Population (2005 census)
  - Total: 8,966
  - Density: 18.99/km^{2} (49.19/sq mi)
- Time zone: UTC-5 (PET)
- UBIGEO: 030604

Huaccana District is one of the eight districts of the province Chincheros in Peru.

== Ethnic groups ==
The people in the district are mainly indigenous citizens of Quechua descent. Quechua is the language which the majority of the population (83.12%) learn to speak in childhood, 16.39% of the residents started speaking using the Spanish language (2007 Peru Census).
