= Ranracancha District =

Coordinates: 13°32′01″S 73°36′19″W

Ranracancha Ranra Kancha
- District
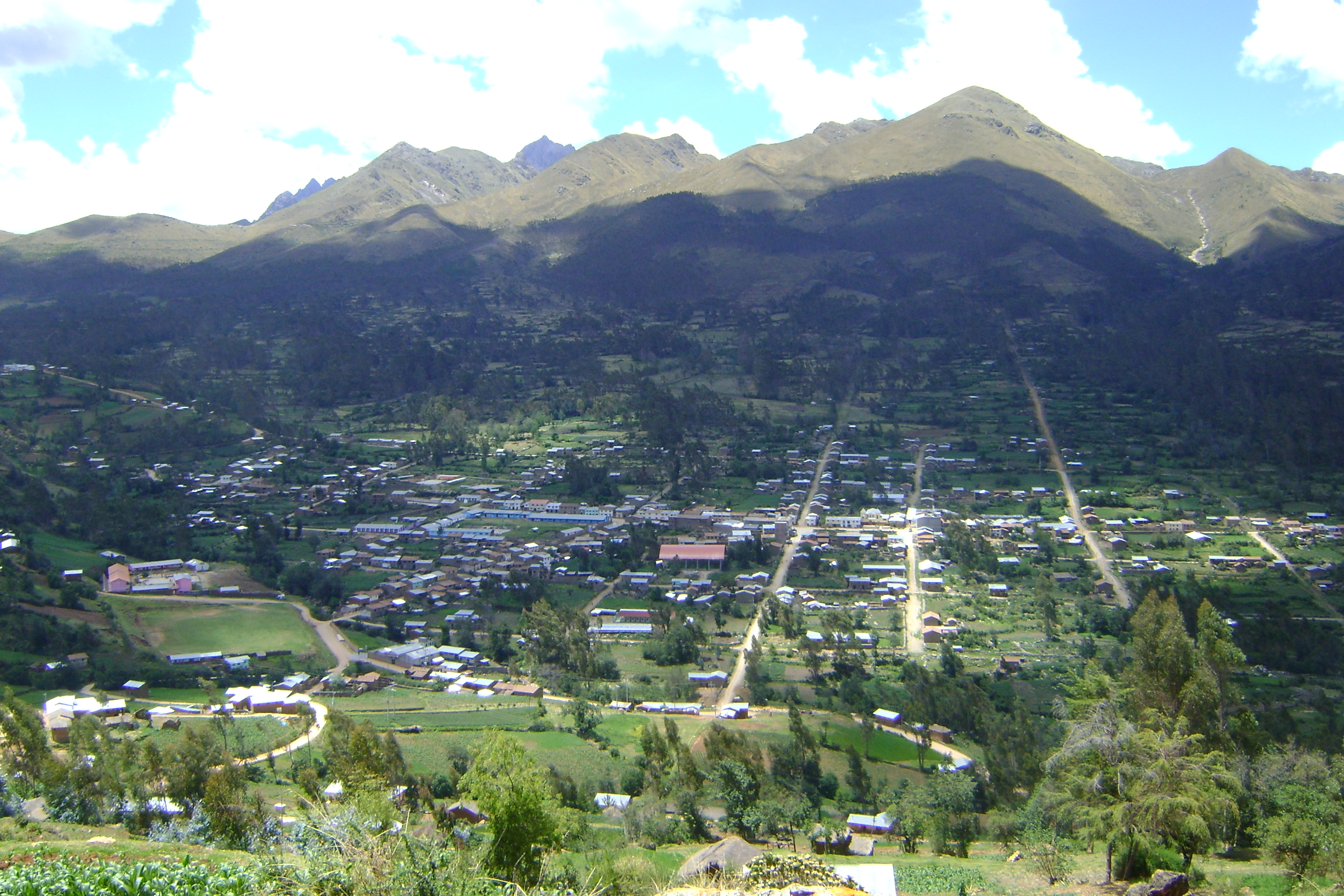
- Ranracancha
- Interactive map of Ranracancha
- Country: Peru
- Region: Apurímac
- Province: Chincheros
- Founded: October 29, 1993
- Capital: Ranracancha

Area
  - Total: 44.52 km^{2} (17.19 sq mi)
- Elevation: 3,400 m (11,200 ft)

Population (2005 census)
  - Total: 5,588
  - Density: 125.5/km^{2} (325.1/sq mi)
- Time zone: UTC-5 (PET)
- UBIGEO: 030608

Ranracancha (hispanicized spelling of Quechua Ranra Kancha, ranra, stony; stony ground, kancha corral,"stony corral") is one of the eight districts of the province Chincheros in Peru.

== Ethnic groups ==
The people in the district are mainly indigenous citizens of Quechua descent. Quechua is the language which the majority of the population (90.90%) learnt to speak in childhood, 8.87% of the residents started speaking using the Spanish language (2007 Peru Census).
