= Muyu Muyu =

Archaeological site in Peru

- Interactive map of Muyu Muyu
- 13°40′15″S 73°40′23″W
- Periods: Chanka
- Location: Peru, Apurímac Region, Chincheros Province

Muyu Muyu (Quechua muyu circle, the reduplication indicates that there is a group or a complex of something, "a complex of circles", also spelled Muyo Muyo) is an archaeological complex in Peru. It is located in the Apurímac Region, Chincheros Province, Uranmarca District.
