= Viscachayoc (Apurímac) =

Mountain in the Andes of Peru

- Location within Peru

Highest point
- Elevation: 4,200 m (13,800 ft)
- Coordinates: 13°36′52″S 73°37′12″W

Geography
- Location: Peru, Apurímac Region
- Parent range: Andes

Viscachayoc (possibly from Quechua wisk'acha viscacha -yuq a suffix, "the one with viscachas") also spelled Huisca Chayoc, is a mountain in the Andes of Peru which reaches a height of approximately 4,200 m (13,800 ft). It is located in the Apurímac Region, Chincheros Province, Uranmarca District.
