= Buryat cuisine =

Culinary traditions of the Buryats

Buryat cuisine is the traditional cuisine of the Buryats, a Mongolic people who mostly live in the Buryat Republic and around Lake Baikal in Russia. Buryat cuisine shares many dishes in common with Mongolian cuisine and has been influenced by Soviet and Russian cuisine.

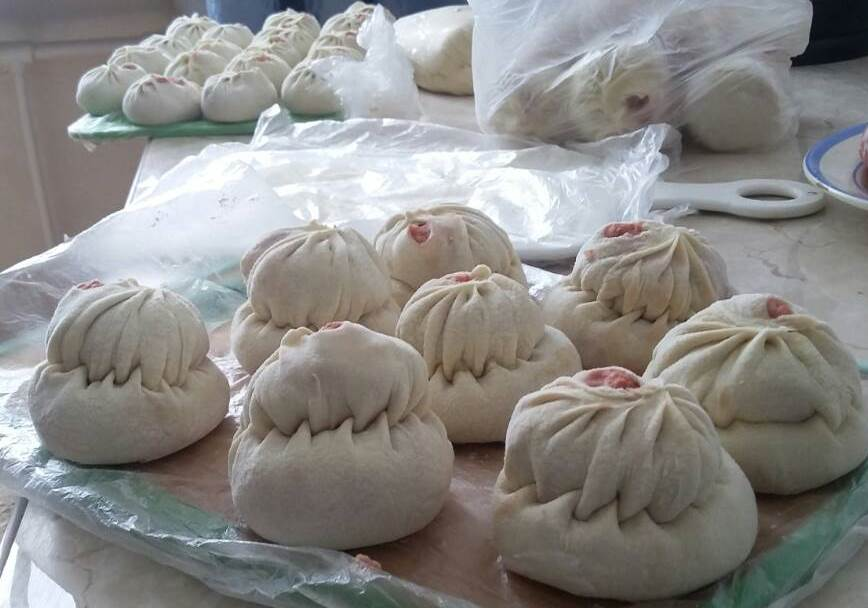
Double buuz ready to be steamed in Buryatia

== Common dishes ==
Most dishes are lamb- or beef-based, but fish dishes are common especially around Lake Baikal. There are also a number of dairy products made by the Buryats. Buryat cuisine is simple and hearty with very little spice. The Buryats, like the Mongols, are known for their buuz, a type of steamed dumpling.

=== Common Buryat foods ===
- Buuza (Buryat: ˈbʊː(d)z(ɐ); Russian: буузы, позы), also known as pozy or buuz in Mongolia, are meat-filled steamed dumplings usually filled with a mixture of either lamb or beef with onions.
- Bukhleor (Бүхэлеэр, бухлёр) is a lamb soup with hand-cut noodles and potatoes.
- Shulen (Шүлэн, шулэн) is a mutton or beef soup with egg noodles and sometimes dumplings (баншатай шүлэн).
- Sagudai (Сагудай), a local version of sashimi made from fresh fish from Lake Baikal
- Khuushuur (Хуушуур) are fried meat pies usually made with mutton meat and fried in sunflower-seed oil.
- Sharbin (Шарьбан(г), шарбин) are similar to khuushuur but are round in shape.
- Shan'gi (Шаньги) are a flatbread with melted local cheese and can be compared to pizza.
- Salamat (Шанаһан зөөхэй/салмаад, саламат) is a local dessert made from rye and sour cream.
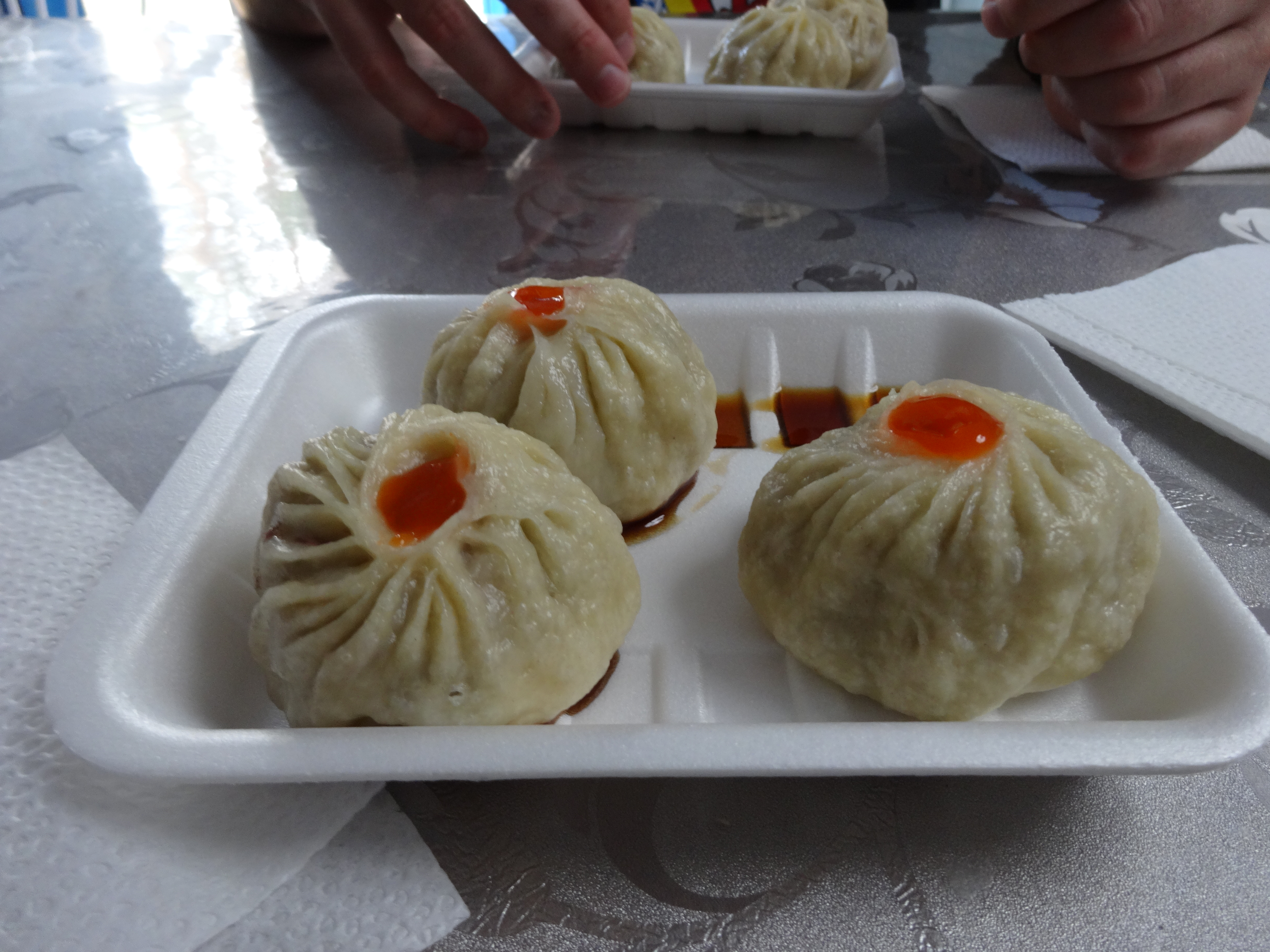
Beef buuza

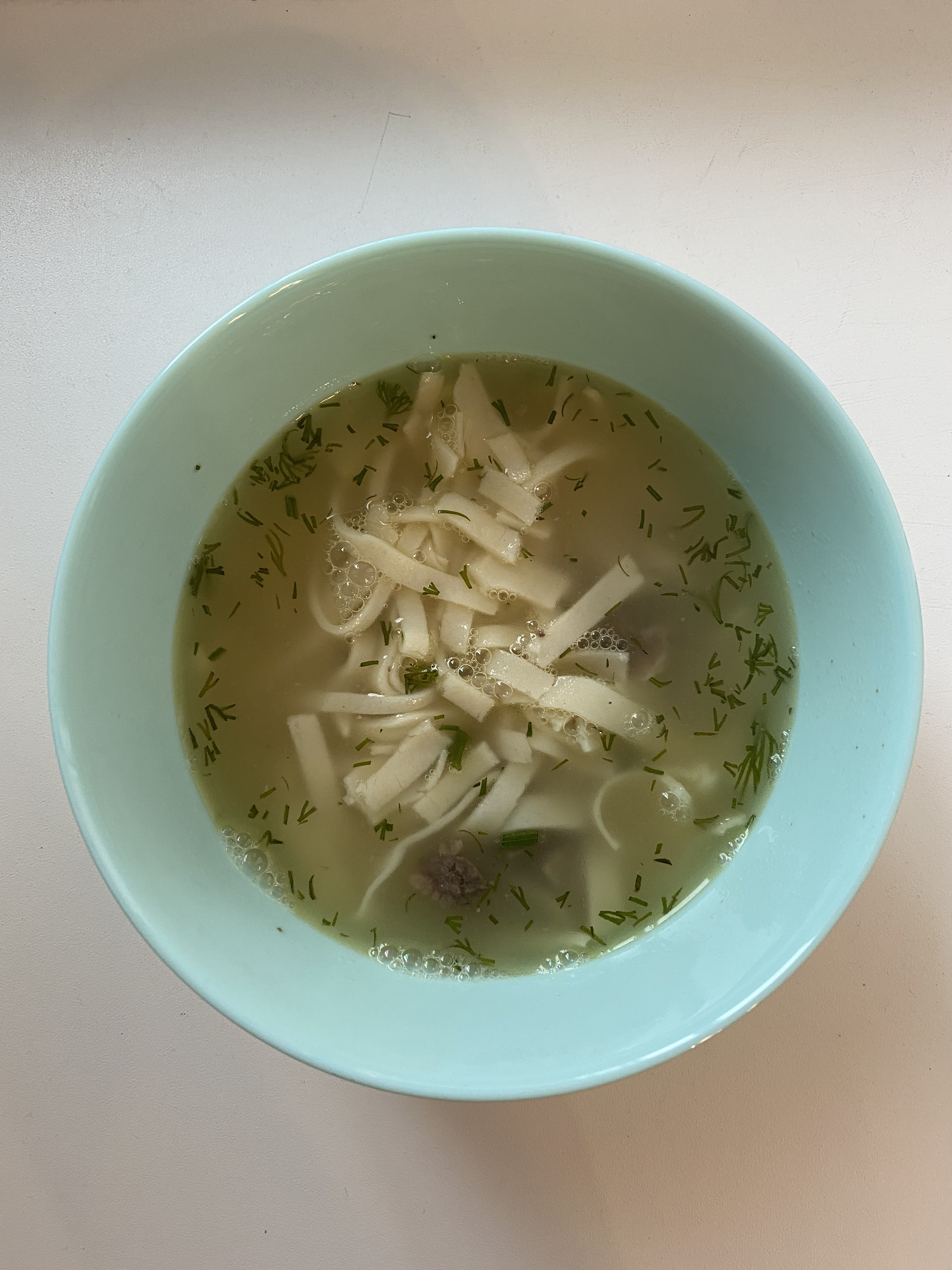
Shulen

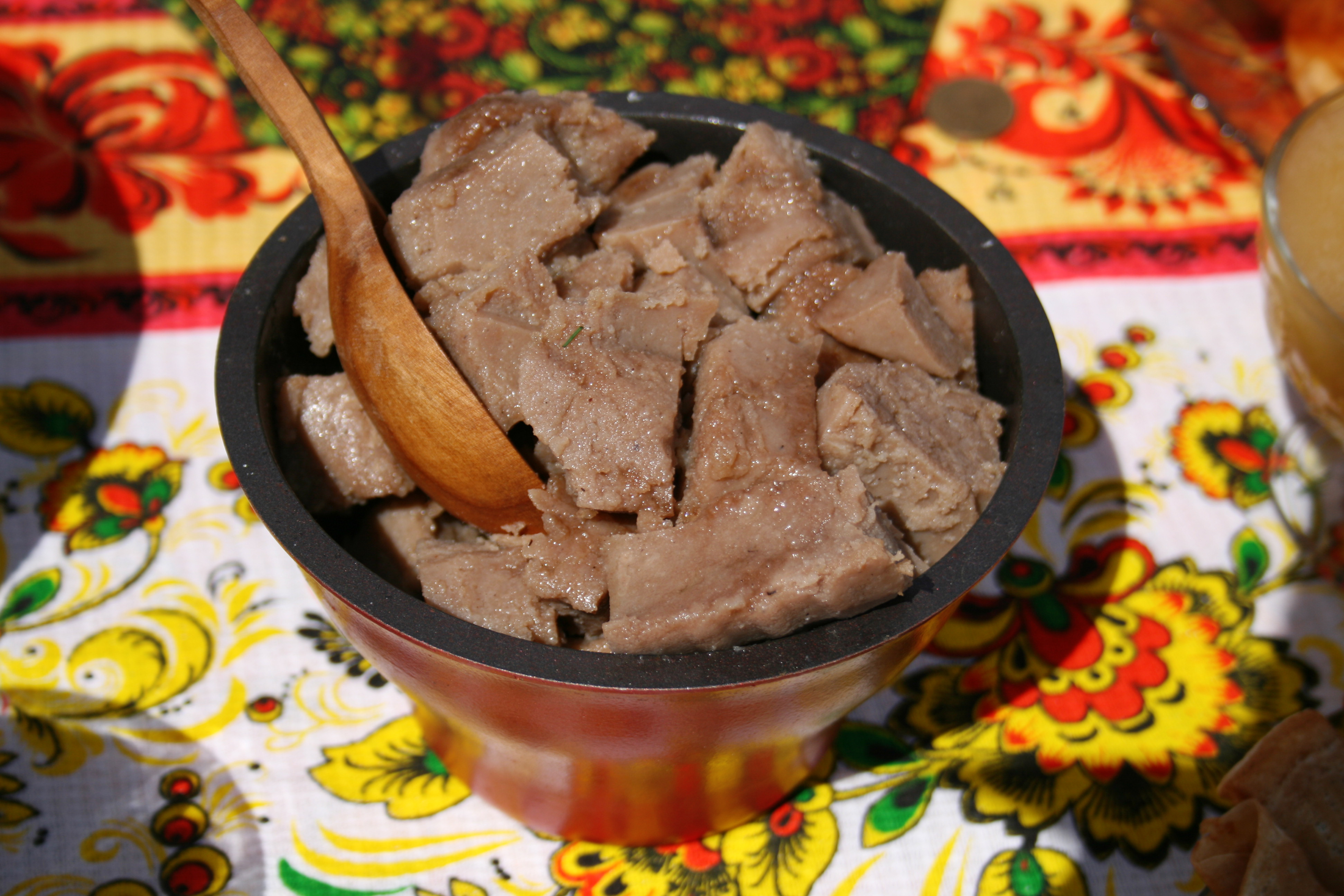
Salamat

=== Dairy products ===
- Airhan (Айрһан) is a local dried cottage cheese, variant of aaruul.
- Khuruud (Хурууд) is a traditional Buryat hard cheese.
- Urme (Үрмэ) is a dairy product made from fat milk, which is boiled and then skimmed. The final product is a thick layer of milk skin.
