= Soviet cuisine =

Culinary traditions of the Soviet Union

Soviet cuisine, the common cuisine of the Soviet Union, was formed by the integration of the various national cuisines of the Soviet Union, in the course of the formation of the Soviet people. It is characterized by a limited number of ingredients and simplified cooking. This type of cuisine was prevalent in canteens everywhere in the Soviet Union. It became an integral part of household cuisine and was used in parallel with national dishes, particularly in large cities. Generally, Soviet cuisine was shaped by Soviet eating habits and a very limited availability of ingredients in most parts of the USSR. Most dishes were simplifications of French, Russian, Austro-Hungarian cuisines, and cuisines from other Eastern Bloc nations. Caucasian cuisines, particularly Georgian cuisine, contributed as well.

To a significant extent it was reflected in and formed by The Book of Tasty and Healthy Food, first printed in 1939, following the directions of Anastas Mikoyan. This book included recipes for sophisticated meals that few Soviet citizens could cook, as in reality these recipes represented the types of meals one possibly could eat in the future in accordance with the state propaganda in the Soviet Union.

== See also ==
- Armenian cuisine
- Ashkenazi Jewish cuisine
- Azerbaijani cuisine
- Bashkir cuisine
- Belarusian cuisine
- Buryat cuisine
- Chechen cuisine
- Chukchi cuisine
- Cossack cuisine
- Georgian cuisine
- Kazakh cuisine
- Komi cuisine
- Kyrgyz cuisine
- Moldovan cuisine
- Mordovian cuisine
- Ossetian cuisine
- Russian cuisine
- Sakha cuisine
- Tajik cuisine
- Tatar cuisine
- Turkmen cuisine
- Ukrainian cuisine
- Uzbek cuisine
