= Anco-Huallo District =

Coordinates: 13°31′59″S 73°40′37″W

Anco-Huallo Anku Wallu
- District
- Interactive map of Anco-Huallo
- Country: Peru
- Region: Apurímac
- Province: Chincheros
- Founded: February 20, 1964
- Capital: Uripa

Government
  - Mayor: Samuel Alex Medina Cardenas

Area
  - Total: 38.9 km^{2} (15.0 sq mi)
- Elevation: 3,204 m (10,512 ft)

Population (2005 census)
  - Total: 10,510
  - Density: 270/km^{2} (700/sq mi)
- Time zone: UTC-5 (PET)
- UBIGEO: 030602

Anco-Huallo District is one of the eight districts of the province Chincheros in Peru.

== Ethnic groups ==
The people in the district are mainly indigenous citizens of Quechua descent. Quechua is the language which the majority of the population (71.16%) learnt to speak in childhood, 28.46% of the residents started speaking using the Spanish language (2007 Peru Census).

== Climate ==
Climate data for Uripa, Anco-Huallo, elevation 3,190 m (10,470 ft)
Month	Jan	Feb	Mar	Apr	May	Jun	Jul	Aug	Sep	Oct	Nov	Dec	Year
Mean daily maximum °C (°F)	19.6 (67.3)	19.6 (67.3)	19.6 (67.3)	19.9 (67.8)	20.2 (68.4)	19.8 (67.6)	19.5 (67.1)	20.4 (68.7)	20.7 (69.3)	21.3 (70.3)	21.6 (70.9)	20.4 (68.7)	20.2 (68.4)
Daily mean °C (°F)	13.9 (57.0)	13.8 (56.8)	13.8 (56.8)	13.7 (56.7)	13.2 (55.8)	12.4 (54.3)	11.9 (53.4)	13.0 (55.4)	13.9 (57.0)	14.5 (58.1)	14.9 (58.8)	14.2 (57.6)	13.6 (56.5)
Mean daily minimum °C (°F)	8.1 (46.6)	7.9 (46.2)	8.0 (46.4)	7.4 (45.3)	6.1 (43.0)	5.0 (41.0)	4.3 (39.7)	5.5 (41.9)	7.0 (44.6)	7.6 (45.7)	8.1 (46.6)	7.9 (46.2)	6.9 (44.4)
Average precipitation mm (inches)	181.5 (7.15)	182.2 (7.17)	214.5 (8.44)	45.3 (1.78)	16.3 (0.64)	4.2 (0.17)	6.7 (0.26)	15.7 (0.62)	41.8 (1.65)	78.2 (3.08)	75.4 (2.97)	121.2 (4.77)	983 (38.7)
Source 1: Municipalidad Distrital de Kishuara
Source 2: Plataforma del Estado Peruano (precipitation 1965–2012)
