= Ocobamba District, Chincheros =

Coordinates: 13°28′59″S 73°33′40″W

Ocobamba
- District
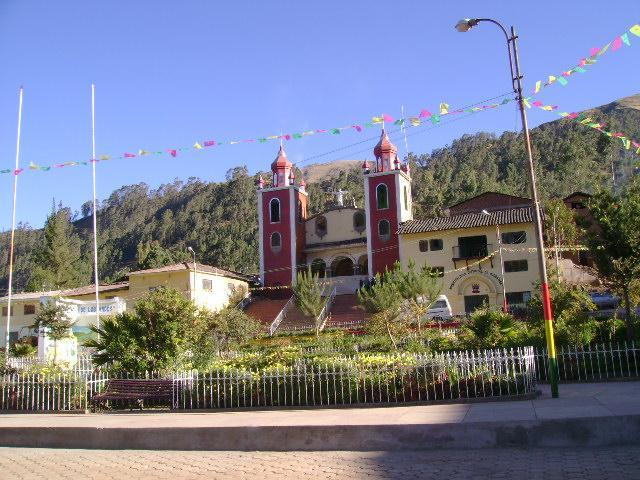
- Ocobamba
- Interactive map of Ocobamba
- Country: Peru
- Region: Apurímac
- Province: Chincheros
- Capital: Ocobamba

Government
  - Mayor: Julio Cesar Ayvar Buendia

Area
  - Total: 58.2 km^{2} (22.5 sq mi)
- Elevation: 3,006 m (9,862 ft)

Population (2005 census)
  - Total: 8,253
  - Density: 142/km^{2} (367/sq mi)
- Time zone: UTC-5 (PET)
- UBIGEO: 030605

Ocobamba District is one of the eight districts of the province Chincheros in Peru.

== Ethnic groups ==
The people in the district are mainly indigenous citizens of Quechua descent. Quechua is the language which the majority of the population (80.99%) learnt to speak in childhood, 18.56% of the residents started speaking using the Spanish language (2007 Peru Census).
