= Chincheros District =

Coordinates: 13°30′47″S 73°42′47″W

Chincheros
- District
- Interactive map of Chincheros
- Country: Peru
- Region: Apurímac
- Province: Chincheros
- Capital: Chincheros

Government
  - Mayor: Pascual Huamanñahui Alegria

Area
  - Total: 132.4 km^{2} (51.1 sq mi)
- Elevation: 2,772 m (9,094 ft)

Population (2005 census)
  - Total: 5,005
  - Density: 37.80/km^{2} (97.91/sq mi)
- Time zone: UTC-5 (PET)
- UBIGEO: 030601

Chincheros is the Capital of the Province Chincheros. Chincheros District is one of the eight districts of the province Chincheros in Peru.

== Ethnic groups ==
The people in Chincheros are mainly indigenous citizens of Quechua descent. Quechua is the language which the majority of the population (62.72%) learnt to speak in childhood, 36.79% of the residents started speaking using the Spanish language (2007 Peru Census).
