= Ikinat =

Ikinat Икинат
- Village
- Location within Irkutsk Oblast Location within Russia
- Coordinates: 53°23′N 103°16′E
- Country: Russia
- Region: Irkutsk Oblast
- District: Alarsky District
- Time zone: UTC+8:00

Ikinat (Russian: Икинат) is a rural locality (a village) in Alarsky District, Irkutsk Oblast, Russia. Population: 270 (2010 census);

== Geography ==
This rural locality is located 32 kilometres (20 mi) from Kutulik (the district's administrative centre), 140 kilometres (87 mi) from Irkutsk (capital of Irkutsk Oblast) and 4,362 kilometres (2,710 mi) from Moscow. Apkhayta is the nearest rural locality.
