= Gotol =

Gotol Готол
- Village
- Location within Irkutsk Oblast Location within Russia
- Coordinates: 53°11′N 102°32′E
- Country: Russia
- Region: Irkutsk Oblast
- District: Alarsky District
- Time zone: UTC+8:00

Gotol (Russian: Готол) is a rural locality (a village) in Alarsky District, Irkutsk Oblast, Russia. Population: 55 (2010 census);

== Geography ==
This rural locality is located 24 kilometres (15 mi) from Kutulik (the district's administrative centre), 153 kilometres (95 mi) from Irkutsk (capital of Irkutsk Oblast) and 4,335 kilometres (2,694 mi) from Moscow. Kukunur is the nearest rural locality.
