= Ongoy =

Ongoy Онгой
- Village
- Location within Irkutsk Oblast Location within Russia
- Coordinates: 53°02′N 105°03′E
- Country: Russia
- Region: Irkutsk Oblast
- District: Bayandayevsky District
- Time zone: UTC+8:00

Ongoy (Russian: Онгой) is a rural locality (a village) in Bayandayevsky District, Irkutsk Oblast, Russia. Population: 43 (2010 census);

== Geography ==
This rural locality is located 30 kilometres (19 mi) from Bayanday (the district's administrative centre), 98 kilometres (61 mi) from Irkutsk (capital of Irkutsk Oblast) and 4,519 kilometres (2,808 mi) from Moscow. Khabarovsk is the nearest rural locality.
