= Chincheros =

- Town
- Location within Peru
- Coordinates: 13°31′22″S 73°43′42″W
- Country: Peru
- Region: Apurímac
- Province: Chincheros
- District: Chincheros

Government
  - Mayor: Franklin Palomino Malpartida
- Elevation: 3,772 m (12,375 ft)
- Time zone: UTC-5 (PET)

Chincheros is a town in southern Peru, capital of the province of the same name in the Apurímac Region. As of the last Census in 2012, Chincheros has a total population of 51,583. The inhabitants are mainly indigenous citizen of Chanka descent, primarily speaking Quechuan languages.

== Geography ==
=== Climate ===
Chincheros has an alpine climate (Köppen ETH) typical for the Peruvian altiplano, bordering upon a subtropical highland climate. Typically for the region, afternoons are pleasant year-round although with extremely intense solar radiation, whilst mornings are freezing, especially during the dry season from April to October.

Climate data for Chincheros, Peru (1981-2010)
Month	Jan	Feb	Mar	Apr	May	Jun	Jul	Aug	Sep	Oct	Nov	Dec	Year
Mean daily maximum °C (°F)	16 (61)	16 (61)	16 (61)	17 (63)	16 (61)	16 (61)	16 (61)	16 (61)	17 (63)	18 (64)	17 (63)	17 (63)	16.5 (61.7)
Mean daily minimum °C (°F)	4 (39)	3 (37)	3 (37)	1 (34)	−2 (28)	−4 (25)	−6 (21)	−4 (25)	−1 (30)	1 (34)	2 (36)	3 (37)	0 (32)
Average precipitation mm (inches)	117 (4.6)	81 (3.2)	72 (2.8)	36 (1.4)	3 (0.1)	3 (0.1)	0 (0)	9 (0.4)	12 (0.5)	24 (0.9)	45 (1.8)	51 (2.0)	453 (17.8)
Average precipitation days (≥ 1.0 mm)	17	10	13	7	2	2	0	2	4	6	8	9	81
Source: WW
