= Chincheros province =

Coordinates: 13°31′22″S 73°43′42″W

Chincheros
- Province
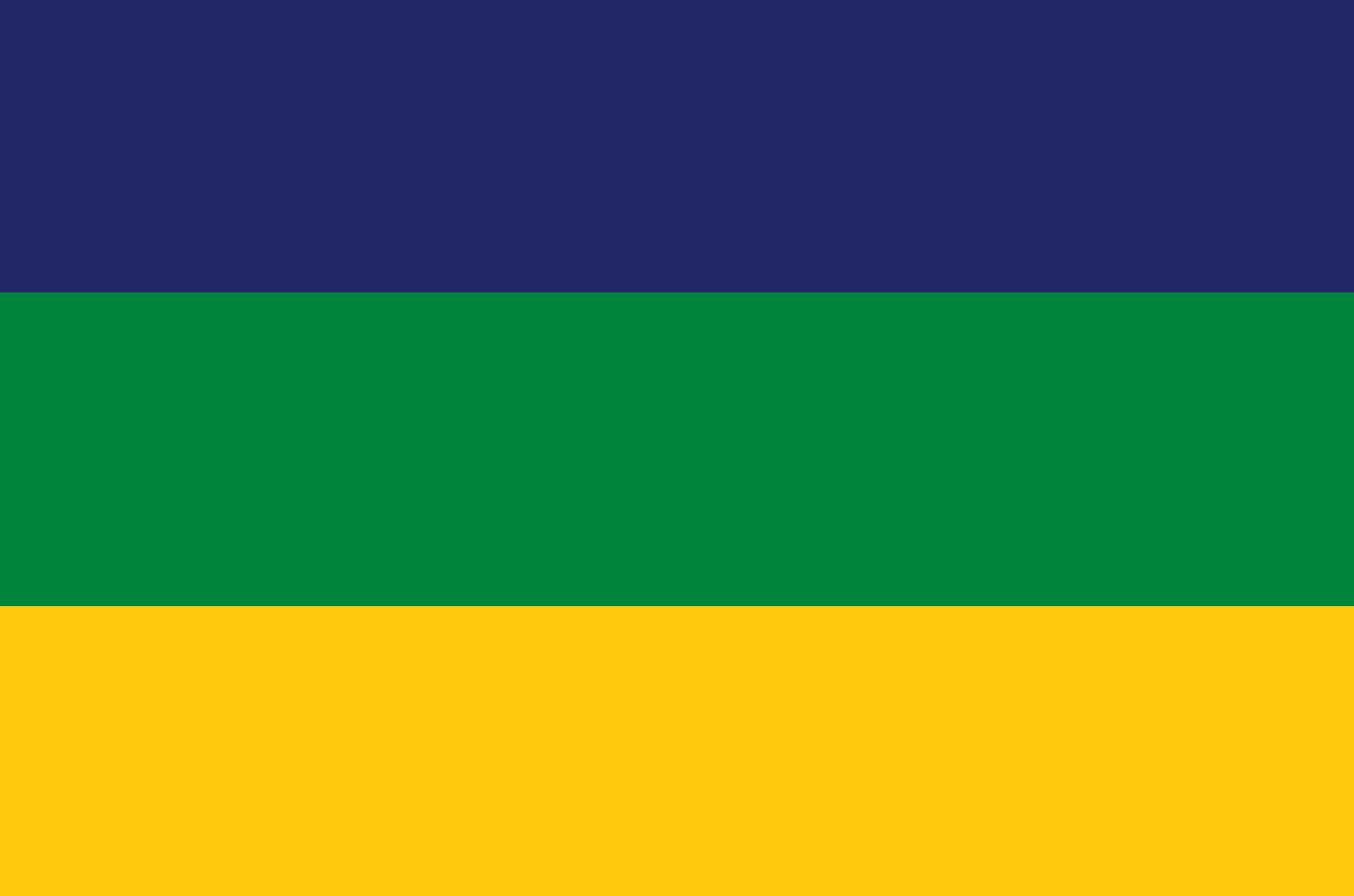
- Flag Coat of arms

- Location of Chincheros in the Apurímac Region
- Country: Peru
- Region: Apurímac
- Capital: Chincheros

Government
  - Mayor: Pascual Huamanñahui Alegria

Area
  - Total: 1,242.33 km^{2} (479.67 sq mi)

Population
  - Total: 52,317
  - Density: 42.112/km^{2} (109.07/sq mi)
- UBIGEO: 0306

Chincheros is the smallest of the seven provinces of the Apurímac Region in Peru. The capital of the province is the city of Chincheros.

== Boundaries ==
- North: Ayacucho Region
- East: province of Andahuaylas
- South: province of Andahuaylas
- West: Ayacucho Region

== Geography ==
One of the highest peaks in the province is Kuntur Wasi at approximately 4,200 m (13,800 ft). Other mountains are listed below:

- Chikuru Pata
- Chuqi Pukyu
- Hatun Kuntur Qaqa
- Llama Wasi
- Llawi P'unqu
- Llulluch'ayuq
- Miyu Urqu
- Puka Qucha
- Puma Puyku
- Qawiña
- Qucha Pata
- Wari Wari
- Waychaw
- Wisk'achayuq
- Yana Urqu

== Political division ==
The province measures 1,242.33 square kilometres (479.67 sq mi) and is divided into eight districts:

- Chincheros
- Anco-Huallo
- Cocharcas
- Huaccana
- Ocobamba
- Ongoy
- Uranmarca
- Ranracancha
- Rocchacc
- El Porvenir
- Los Chankas

== Ethnic groups ==
The people in the province are mainly indigenous citizens of Quechua descent. Quechua is the language which the majority of the population (80.41%) learnt to speak in childhood, 19.09% of the residents started speaking using the Spanish language and 0.14% using Aymara (2007 Peru Census).

== Culture ==
Chincheros is also the site of la Fiesta de la Virgen del Carmen. This yearly Fiesta patronal celebrates the Virgin del Carmen from Mount Carmel in Galilee. During the Spanish conquest of Peru, La Virgen del Carmen became venerated among the native population of the south Andes of Peru. Each locality has its own version of exactly how the veneration began, most related to miracles that she performed, convincing the population. The Fiesta is based around a mass followed by dancing, performances, food, and drink. The dances and other performances vary based on location, but most include satire and parody of Spanish characters, such as landlords, the nobility, even toreros. The fight between peoples of the Andes and the Amazon is also represented, wherein the Andeans win and devils steal the souls of dead bodies to take to Hell. The Fiesta has also been brought to Lima by those former residents of Chincheros who now reside in the country's capitol.

== See also ==
- Muyu Muyu
