= Lake Baikal =

Freshwater rift lake in Russia

- Озеро Байкал (Russian); Байгал далай (Buryat)
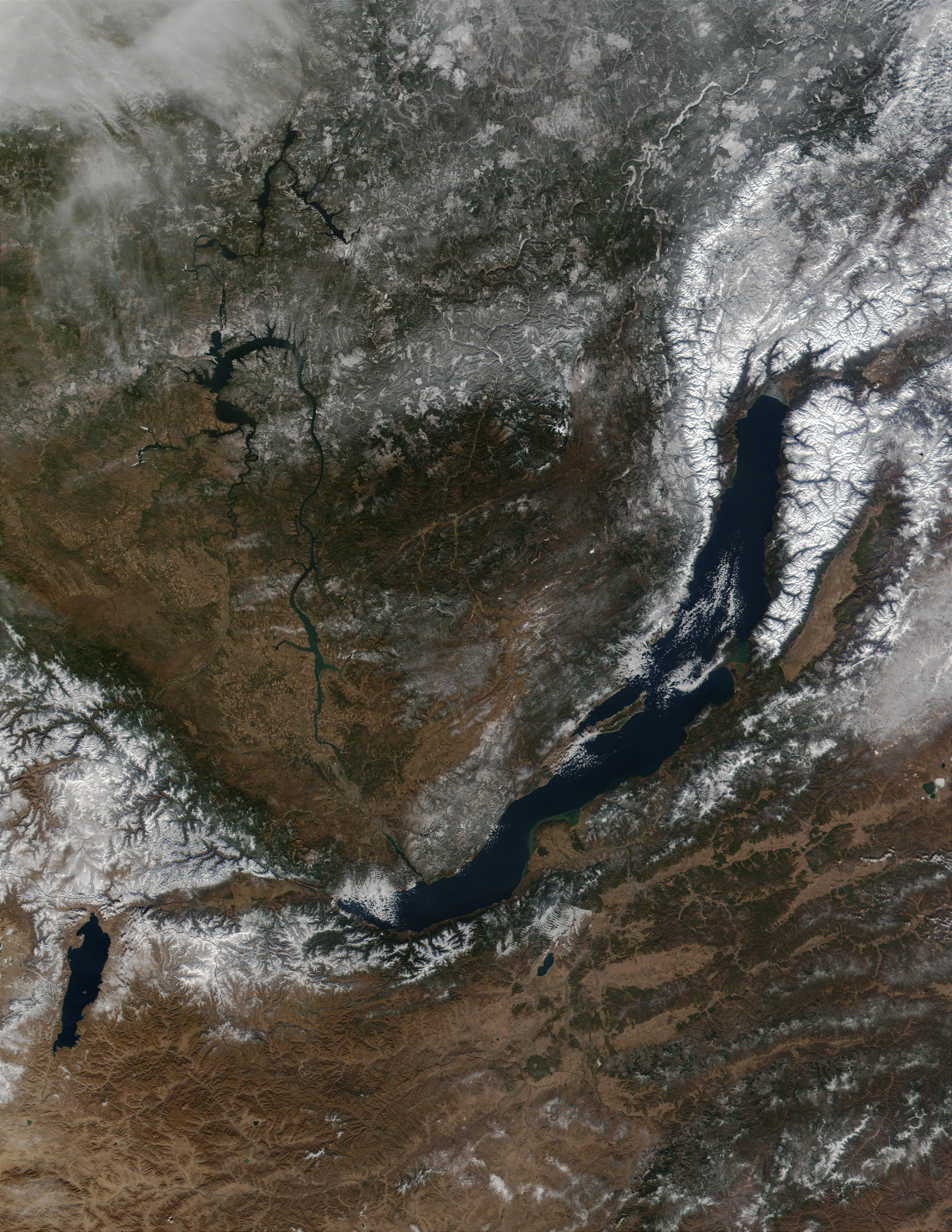
- Satellite photo of Baikal, 2001

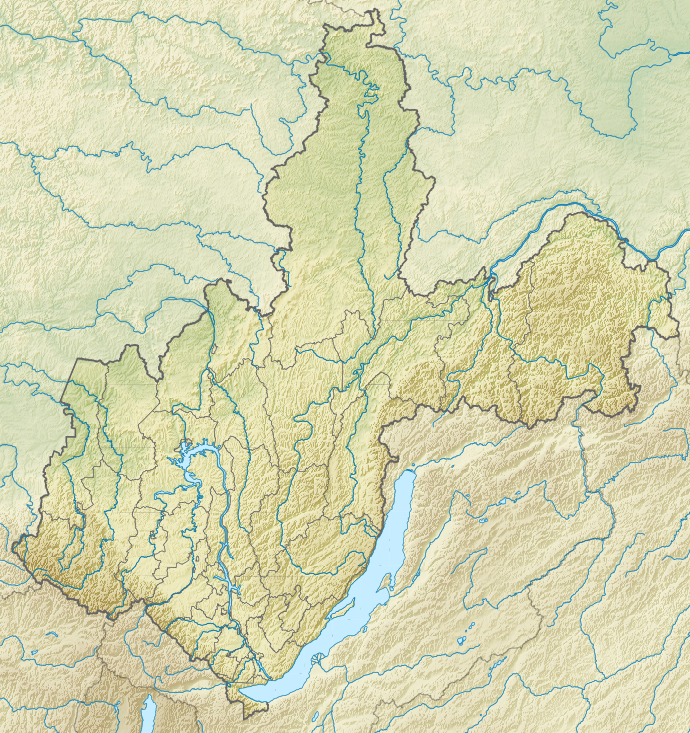
- Location within Republic of Buryatia Location within Irkutsk Oblast Location within Russia

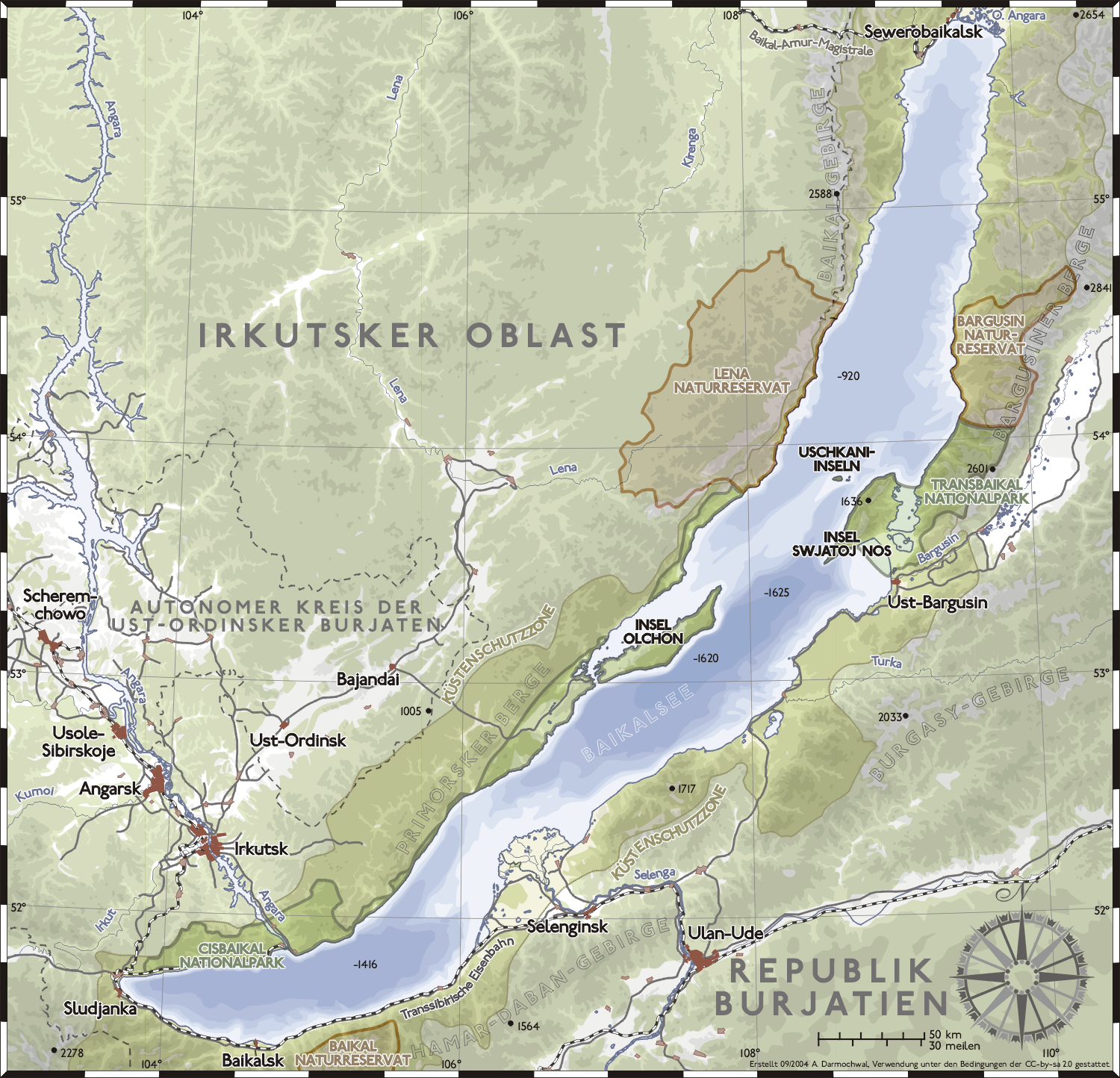
- Location: Siberia, Russia
- Coordinates: 53°30′N 108°0′E
- Lake type: Ancient lake, continental rift lake
- Primary inflows: Selenga, Barguzin, Upper Angara
- Primary outflows: Angara
- Catchment area: 560,000 km^{2} (216,000 sq mi)
- Basin countries: Russia
- Max. length: 636 km (395 mi)
- Max. width: 79 km (49 mi)
- Surface area: 31,722 km^{2} (12,248 sq mi)
- Average depth: 744.4 m (2,442 ft)
- Max. depth: 1,642 m (5,387 ft)
- Water volume: 23,610 km^{3} (5,660 cu mi)
- Residence time: 330 years
- Shore length^{1}: 2,100 km (1,300 mi)
- Surface elevation: 455.5 m (1,494 ft)
- Frozen: January–May
- Islands: 27 (Olkhon Island)
- Settlements: Severobaykalsk, Slyudyanka, Baykalsk, Ust-Barguzin, Listvyanka

UNESCO World Heritage Site
- Criteria: Natural: vii, viii, ix, x
- Reference: 754
- Inscription: 1996 (20th Session)
- Area: 8,800,000 ha (22,000,000 acres)
- ^{1} Shore length is not a well-defined measure.

Lake Baikal (Note: English: /baɪˈkɑːl, baɪˈkæl/ by-KAHL, by-KAL; Russian: Озеро Байкал, romanized: Ózero Baykál, pronounced [ˈozʲɪrə bɐjˈkal]; Buryat: Байгал далай, romanized: Baigal dalai, pronounced [b̥ɛ́e̯ʁəɫ d̥ɐɫɛ́e̯].) is a rift lake and the deepest lake in the world. It is situated in southern Siberia, Russia, between the federal subjects of Irkutsk Oblast to the northwest and the Republic of Buryatia to the southeast.

At 31,722 km^{2} (12,248 sq mi)—slightly larger than Belgium—Lake Baikal is the world's seventh-largest lake by surface area, as well as the second-largest lake in Eurasia after the Caspian Sea. However, because it is also the deepest lake, with a maximum depth of 1,642 metres (5,387 feet), Lake Baikal is the world's largest freshwater lake by volume, containing 23,615.39 km^{3} (5,670 cu mi) of water or 22–23% of the world's fresh surface water, more than all of the North American Great Lakes combined. It is also the world's oldest lake at 25–30 million years, and among the clearest. It is estimated that the lake contains around 19% of the unfrozen fresh water on the planet.

Lake Baikal is home to thousands of species of plants and animals, many of them endemic to the region. It is also home to Buryat tribes, who raise goats, camels, cattle, sheep, and horses, on the eastern side of the lake within Buryatia, where the mean temperature varies from a winter minimum of −19 °C (−2 °F) to a summer maximum of 14 °C (57 °F). The region to the east of Lake Baikal is referred to as Transbaikalia or as the Transbaikal, and the loosely defined region around the lake itself is sometimes known as Baikalia. UNESCO declared Baikal a World Heritage Site in 1996.

== Geography and hydrography ==
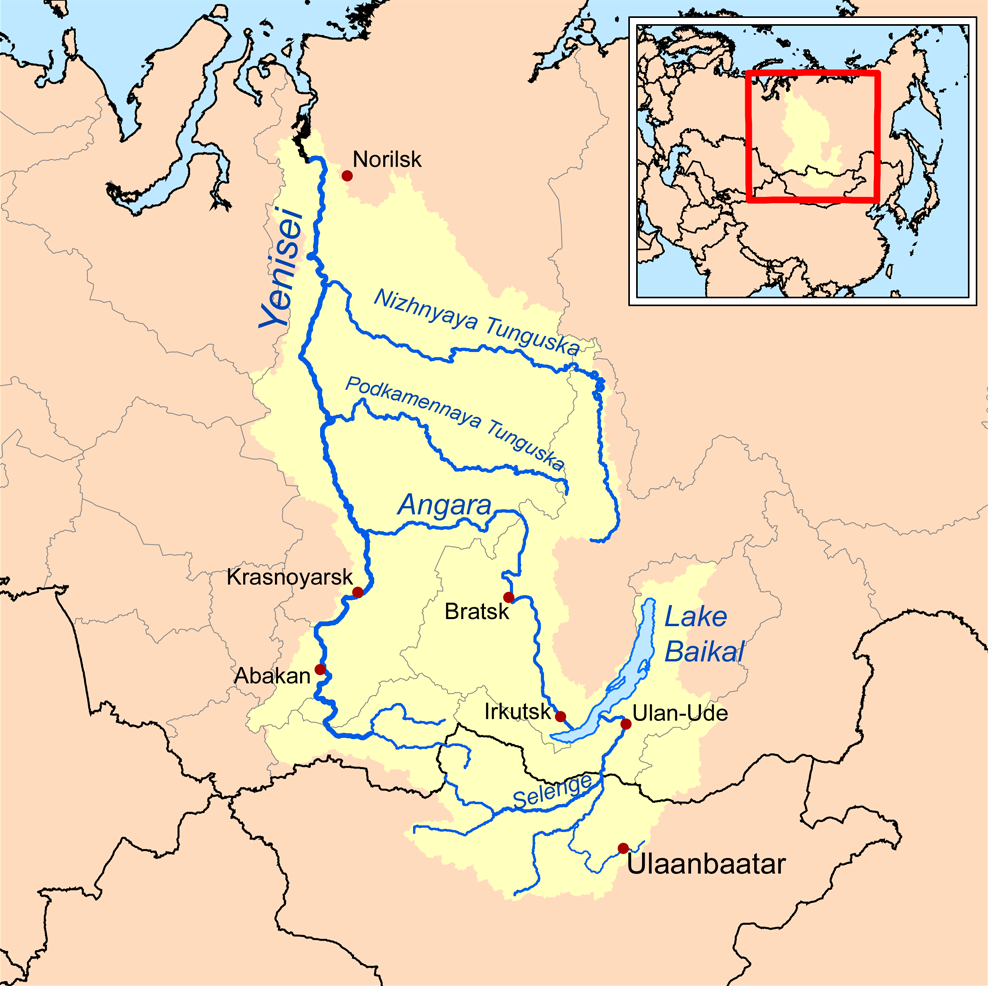
The Yenisey basin, which includes Lake Baikal

Lake Baikal is in a rift valley, created by the Baikal Rift Zone, where the Earth's crust is slowly pulling apart. At 636 km (395 mi) long and 79 km (49 mi) wide, Lake Baikal has the largest surface area of any freshwater lake in Asia, at 31,722 km^{2} (12,248 sq mi), and is the deepest lake in the world at 1,642 metres (5,387 feet; 898 fathoms). The surface of the lake is 455.5 m (1,494 ft) above sea level, while the bottom of the lake is 1,186.5 m (3,893 ft; 648.8 fathoms) below sea level, and below this lies some 7 km (4.3 mi) of sediment, placing the rift floor some 8–11 km (5.0–6.8 mi) below the surface, the deepest continental rift on Earth.

In geological terms, the rift is young and active—it widens about 4 mm (0.16 in) per year. The fault zone is also seismically active; hot springs occur in the area and notable earthquakes happen every few years. The lake is divided into three basins: North, Central, and South, with depths about 900 m (3,000 ft), 1,600 m (5,200 ft), and 1,400 m (4,600 ft), respectively. Fault-controlled accommodation zones rising to depths of 300 m (980 ft) separate the basins. The North and Central basins are separated by Academician Ridge, while the area around the Selenga Delta and the Buguldeika Saddle separates the Central and South basins. The lake drains into the Angara, a tributary of the Yenisey. Landforms include Cape Ryty on Baikal's northwest coast.

Baikal's age is estimated at 25–30 million years, making it the most ancient lake in geological history. It is unique among large, high-latitude lakes, as its sediments have not been scoured by overriding continental ice sheets. Russian, U.S., and Japanese cooperative studies of deep-drilling core sediments in the 1990s provide a detailed record of climatic variation over the past 6.7 million years.

Longer and deeper sediment cores are expected in the near future. Lake Baikal is the only confined freshwater lake in which direct and indirect evidence of gas hydrates exists.

The lake is surrounded by mountains; the Baikal Mountains on the north shore, the Barguzin Range on the northeastern shore and the Primorsky Range stretching along the western shore. The mountains and the taiga are protected as a national park. It contains 27 islands; the largest, Olkhon, is 72 km (45 mi) long and is the third-largest lake-bound island in the world. The lake is fed by as many as 330 inflowing rivers. The main rivers draining directly into Baikal are the Selenga, the Barguzin, the Upper Angara, the Turka, the Sarma, and the Snezhnaya. It is drained through a single outlet, the Angara.

Regular winds exist in Baikal's rift valley.

=== Water characteristics ===
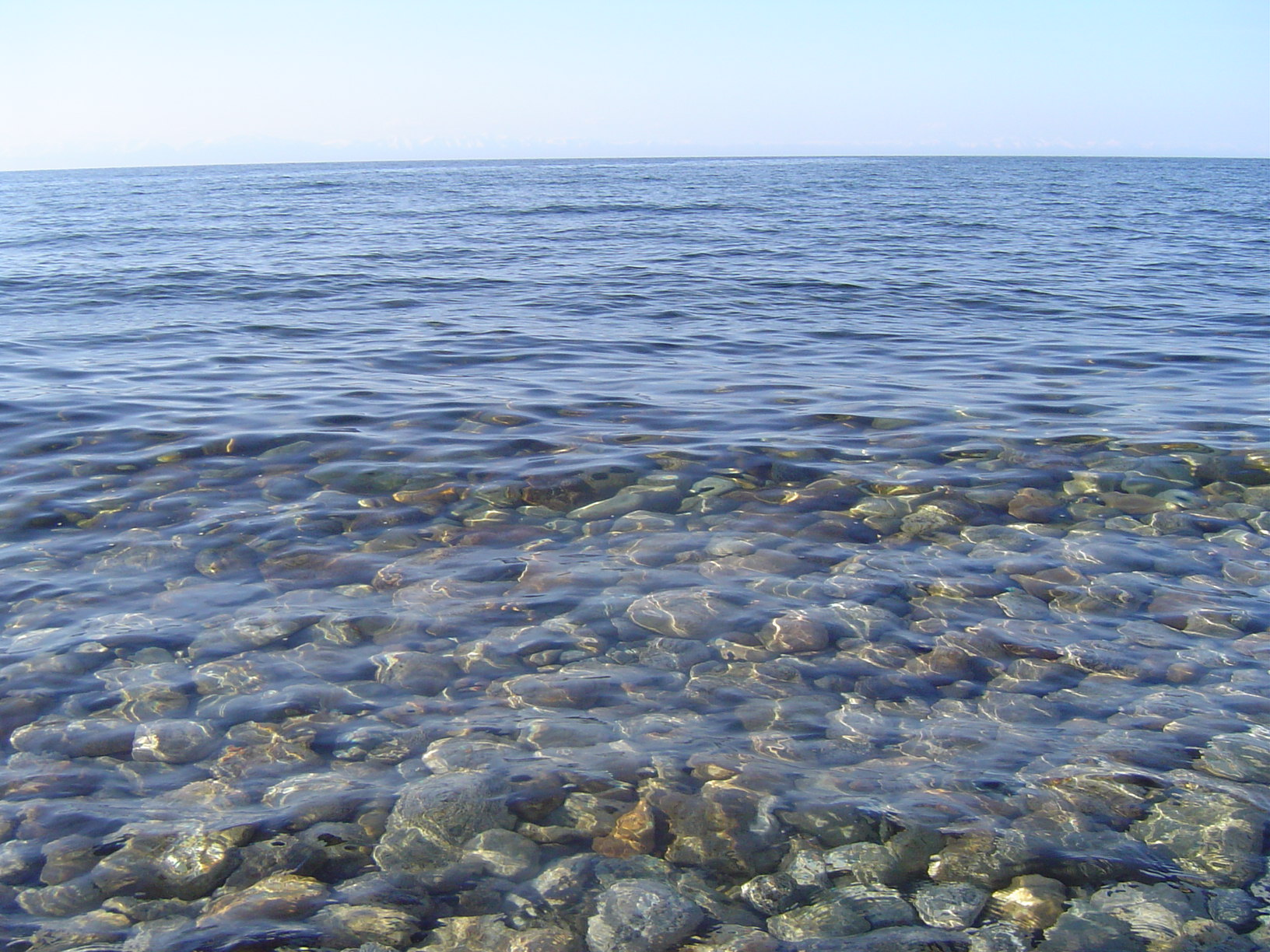
Lake Baikal's water is especially clear

Baikal is one of the clearest lakes in the world. During the winter, the water transparency in open sections can be as much as 30–40 m (100–130 ft), but during the summer it is typically 5–8 m (15–25 ft). Baikal is rich in oxygen, even in deep sections, which separates it from distinctly stratified bodies of water such as Lake Tanganyika and the Black Sea.

In Lake Baikal, the water temperature varies significantly depending on location, depth, and time of the year. During the winter and spring, the surface freezes for about 4–5 months; from early January to early May–June (latest in the north), the lake surface is covered in ice. On average, the ice reaches a thickness of 0.5 to 1.4 m (1.6–4.6 ft), but in some places with hummocks, it can be more than 2 m (6.6 ft). During this period, the temperature slowly increases with depth in the lake, being coldest near the ice-covered surface at around freezing, and reaching about 3.5–3.8 °C (38.3–38.8 °F) at a depth of 200–250 m (660–820 ft).

After the surface ice breaks up, the surface water is slowly warmed by the sun, and in May–June, the upper 300 m (980 ft) becomes homothermic (same temperature throughout) at around 4 °C (39 °F) because of water mixing. The sun continues to heat up the surface layer, and at the peak in August can reach up to about 16 °C (61 °F) in the main sections and 20–24 °C (68–75 °F) in shallow bays in the southern half of the lake.

During this time, the pattern is inverted compared to the winter and spring, as the water temperature falls with increasing depth. As the autumn begins, the surface temperature falls again and a second homothermic period at around 4 °C (39 °F) of the upper circa 300 m (980 ft) occurs in October–November. In the deepest parts of the lake, from about 300 m (980 ft), the temperature is stable at 3.1–3.4 °C (37.6–38.1 °F) with only minor annual variations.

The average surface temperature has risen by almost 1.5 °C (2.7 °F) in the last 50 years, resulting in a shorter period when the lake is covered by ice. At some locations, hydrothermal vents with water that is about 50 °C (122 °F) have been found. These are mostly in deep water but locally have also been found in relatively shallow water. They have little effect on the lake's temperature because of its huge volume.

Stormy weather on the lake is common, especially during the summer and autumn, and can result in waves as high as 4.5 m (15 ft).

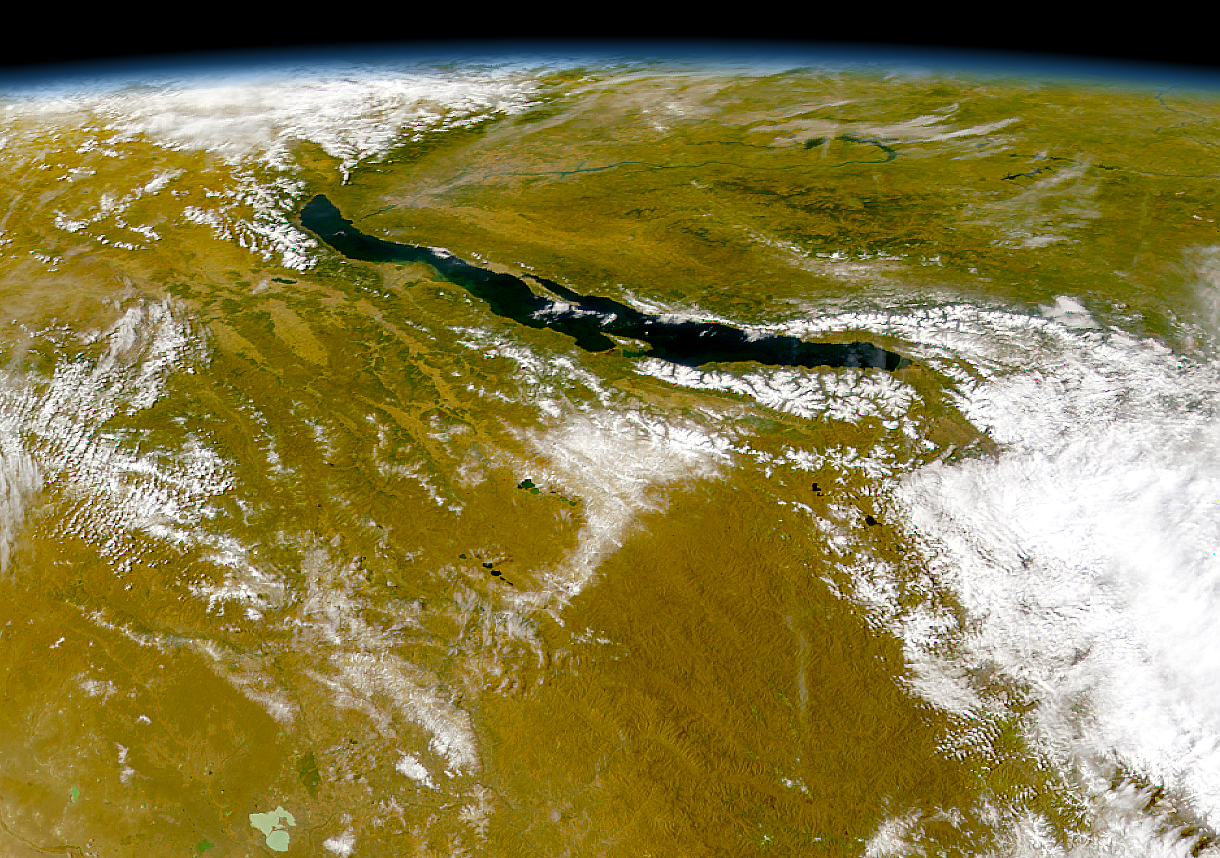
Lake Baikal as seen from the OrbView-2 satellite

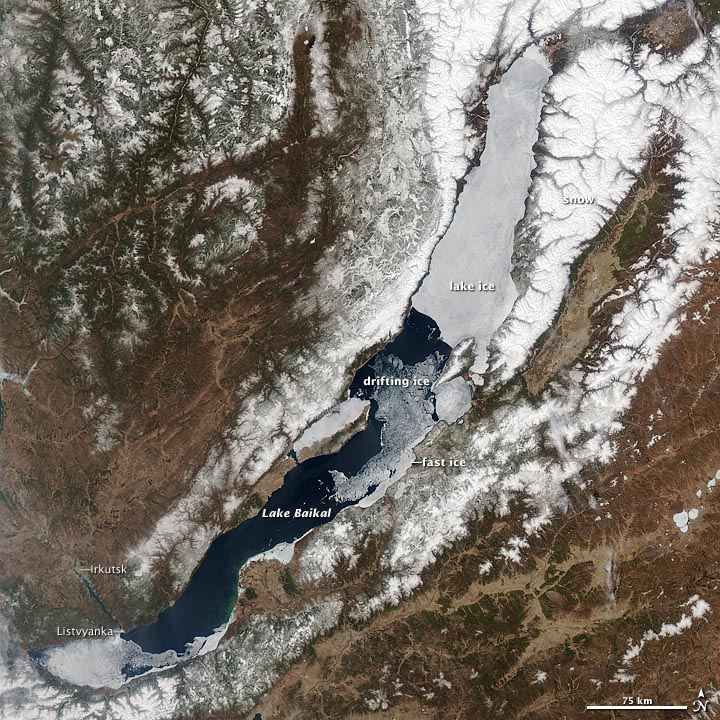
Spring ice melt underway on Lake Baikal, on 4 May, 2012 (Note: Note the ice-covered north, while much of the south is already ice-free.)

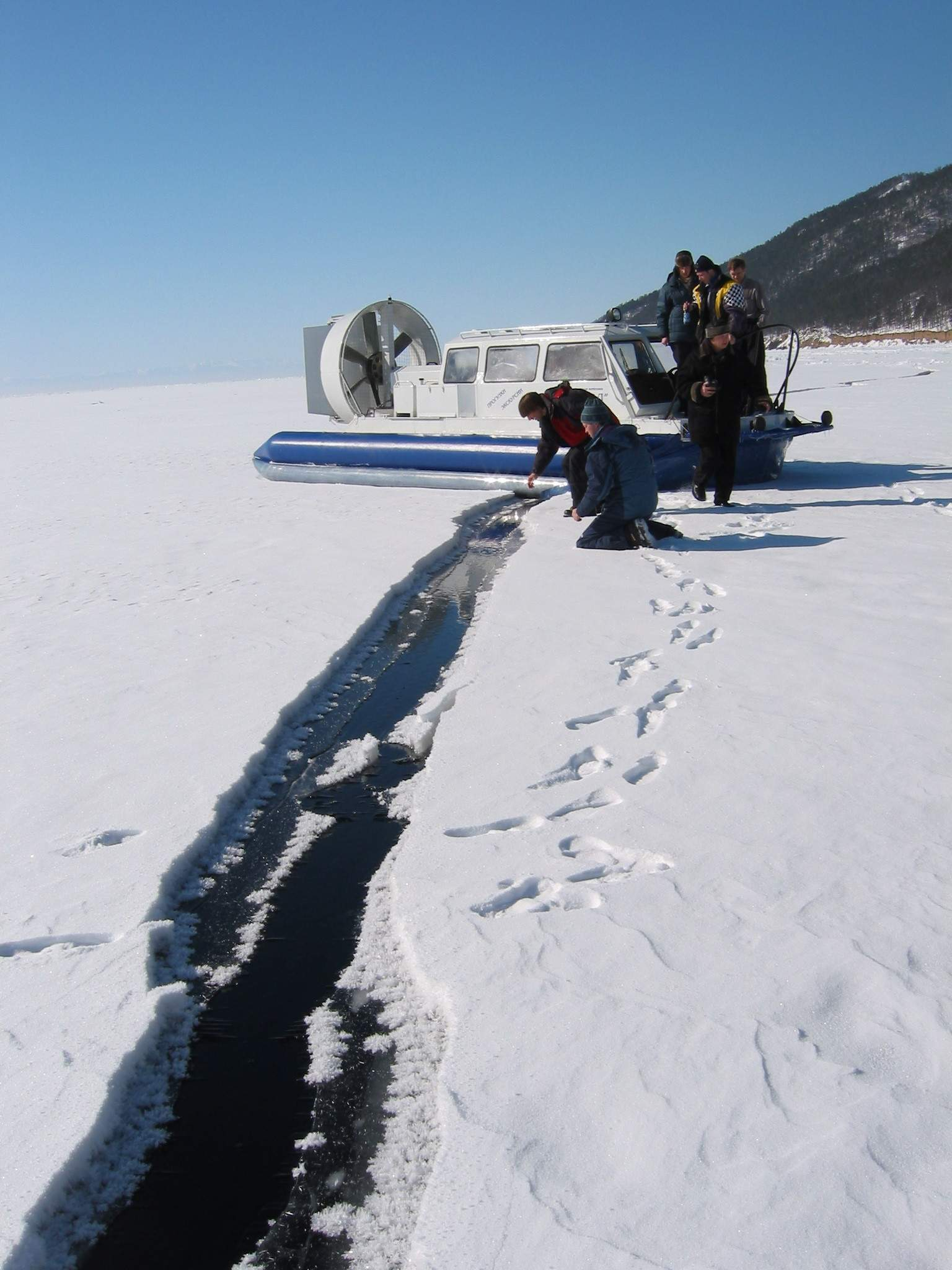
Ice cover survey on the lake

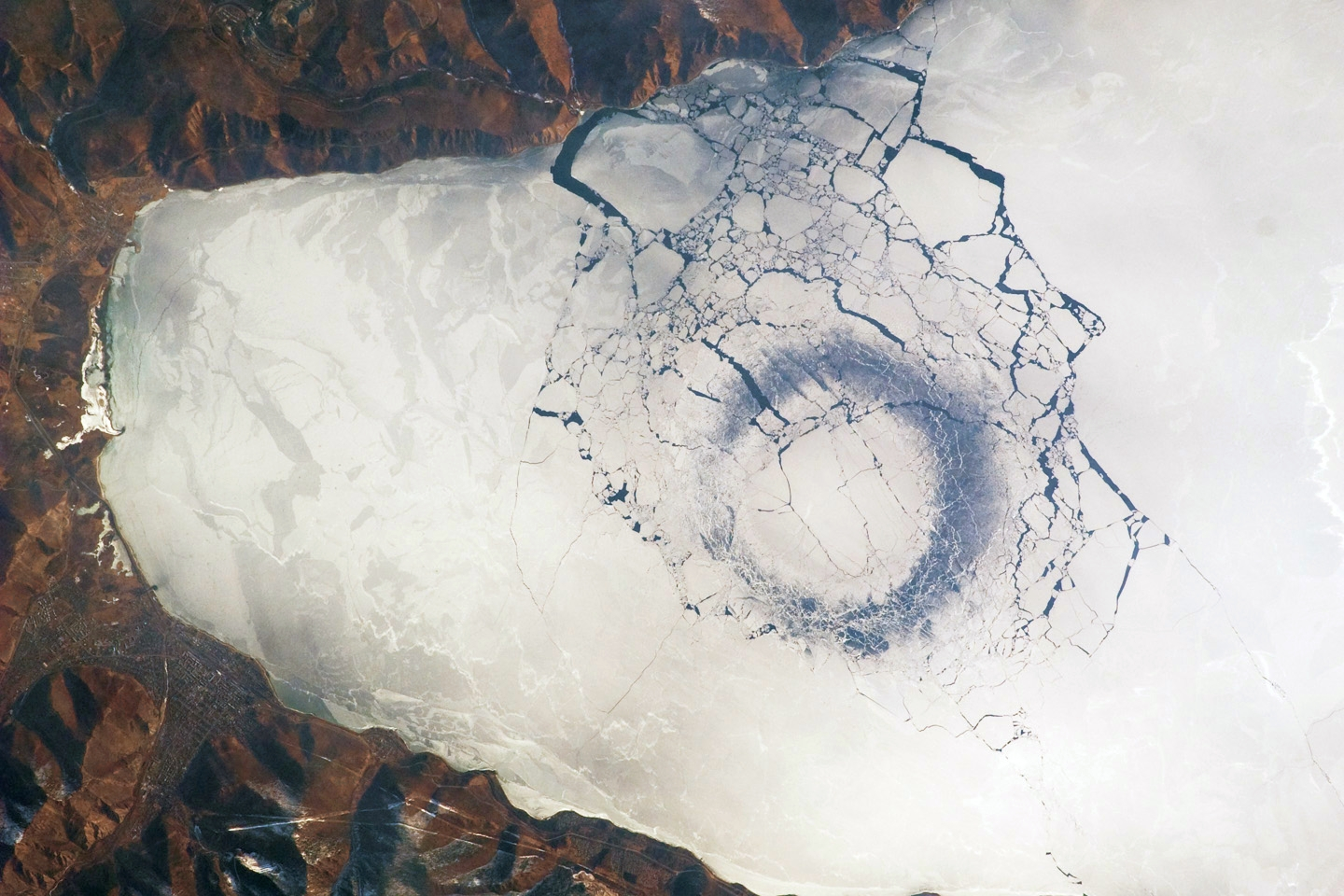
Circle of thin ice, diameter of 4.4 km (2.7 mi) at the lake's southern tip, probably caused by convection

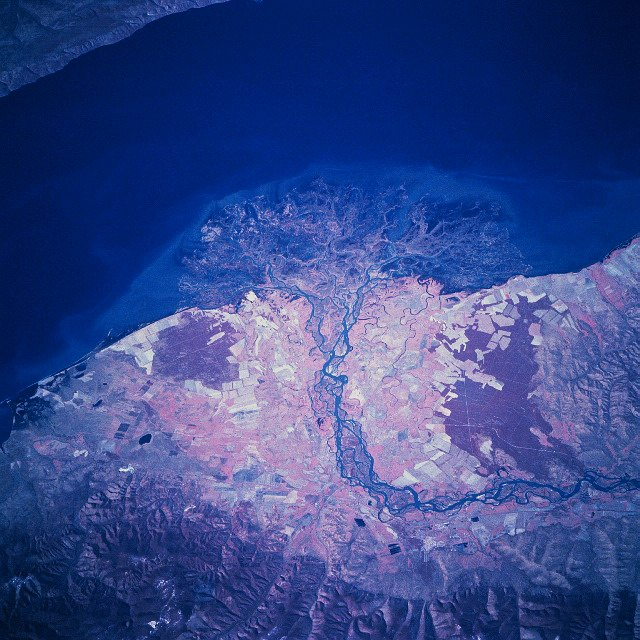
Delta of the Selenga River, Baikal's main tributary

== Ecology ==
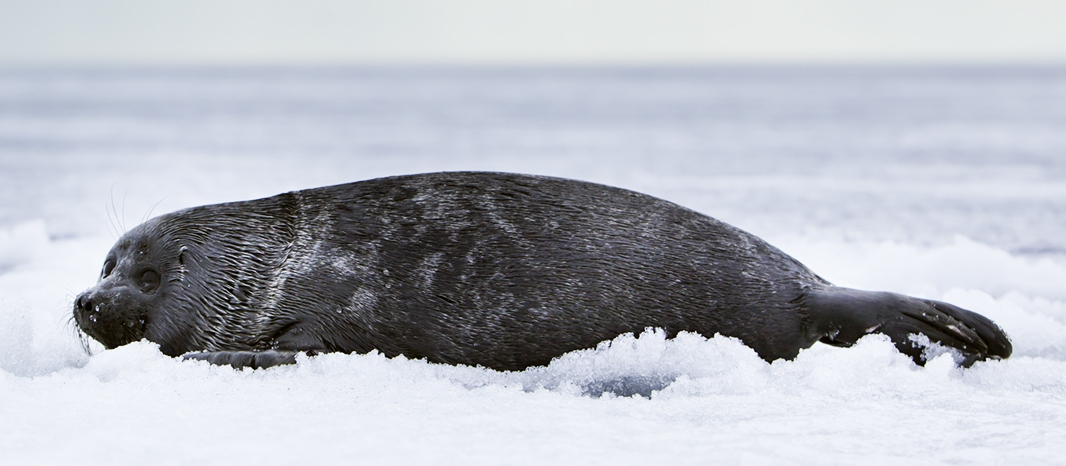
The Baikal seal is endemic to Lake Baikal.

Lake Baikal is rich in biodiversity. It hosts more than 1,000 species of plants and 2,500 species of animals based on current knowledge, but the actual figures for both groups are believed to be significantly higher.

=== Flora ===
The watershed of Lake Baikal has numerous floral species represented. The marsh thistle (Cirsium palustre) is found here at the eastern limit of its geographic range.

Submerged macrophytic vascular plants are mostly absent, except in some shallow bays along the shores of Lake Baikal. More than 85 species of submerged macrophytes have been recorded, including genera such as Ceratophyllum, Myriophyllum, Potamogeton, and Sparganium. The invasive species Elodea canadensis was introduced to the lake in the 1950s. Instead of vascular plants, aquatic flora is often dominated by several green algae species, notably Draparnaldioides, Tetraspora, and Ulothrix in water shallower than 20 m (65 ft); although Aegagrophila, Cladophora, and Draparnaldioides may occur deeper than 30 m (100 ft). Except for Ulothrix, these green algae genera contain species endemic to Baikal. More than 400 diatom species, both benthic and planktonic, are found in the lake, and about half of these are endemic to Baikal; however, significant taxonomic uncertainties remain for this group.

=== Mammals ===
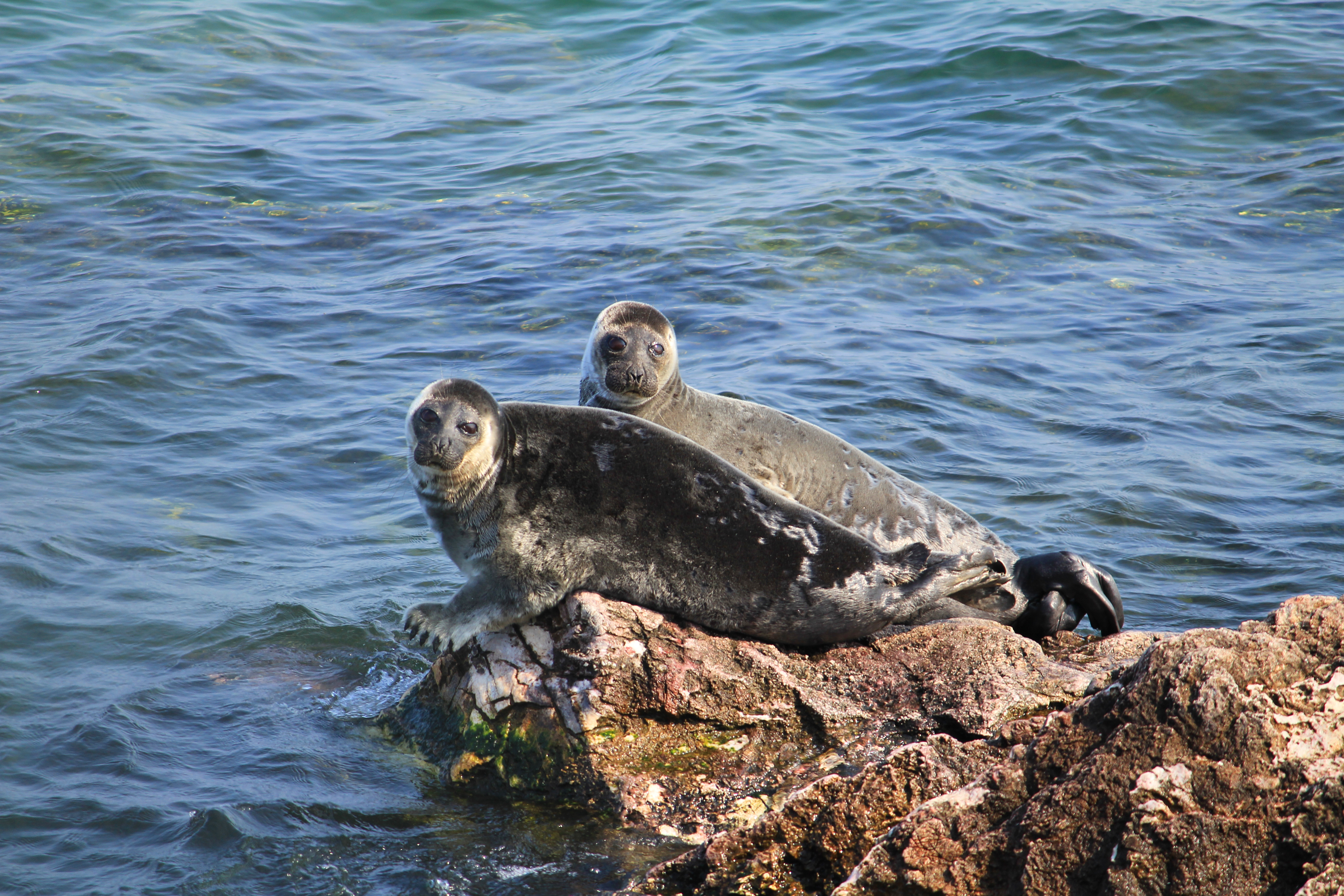
Baikal seal

The Baikal seal or nerpa (Pusa sibirica) is endemic to Lake Baikal.

A wide range of land mammals can be found in the habitats around the lake, such as the brown bear (Ursus arctos), Eurasian wolf (Canis lupus lupus), red fox (Vulpes vulpes), sable (Martes zibellina), stoat (Mustela erminea), least weasel (Mustela nivalis), Eurasian otter (Lutra lutra), snow leopard (Panthera uncia), Siberian tiger (Panthera tigris tigris), Amur leopard (Panthera pardus orientalis), moose (Alces alces), elk (Cervus canadensis), reindeer (Rangifer tarandus), Siberian roe deer (Capreolus pygargus), Siberian musk deer (Moschus moschiferus), wild boar (Sus scrofa), red squirrel (Sciurus vulgaris), Siberian chipmunk (Eutamias sibiricus), marmots (Marmota sp.), lemmings (Lemmus sp.), and mountain hare (Lepus timidus). Until the Early Middle Ages, populations of the European bison (Bison bonasus) were found near the lake; this represented the easternmost range of the species.

=== Birds ===
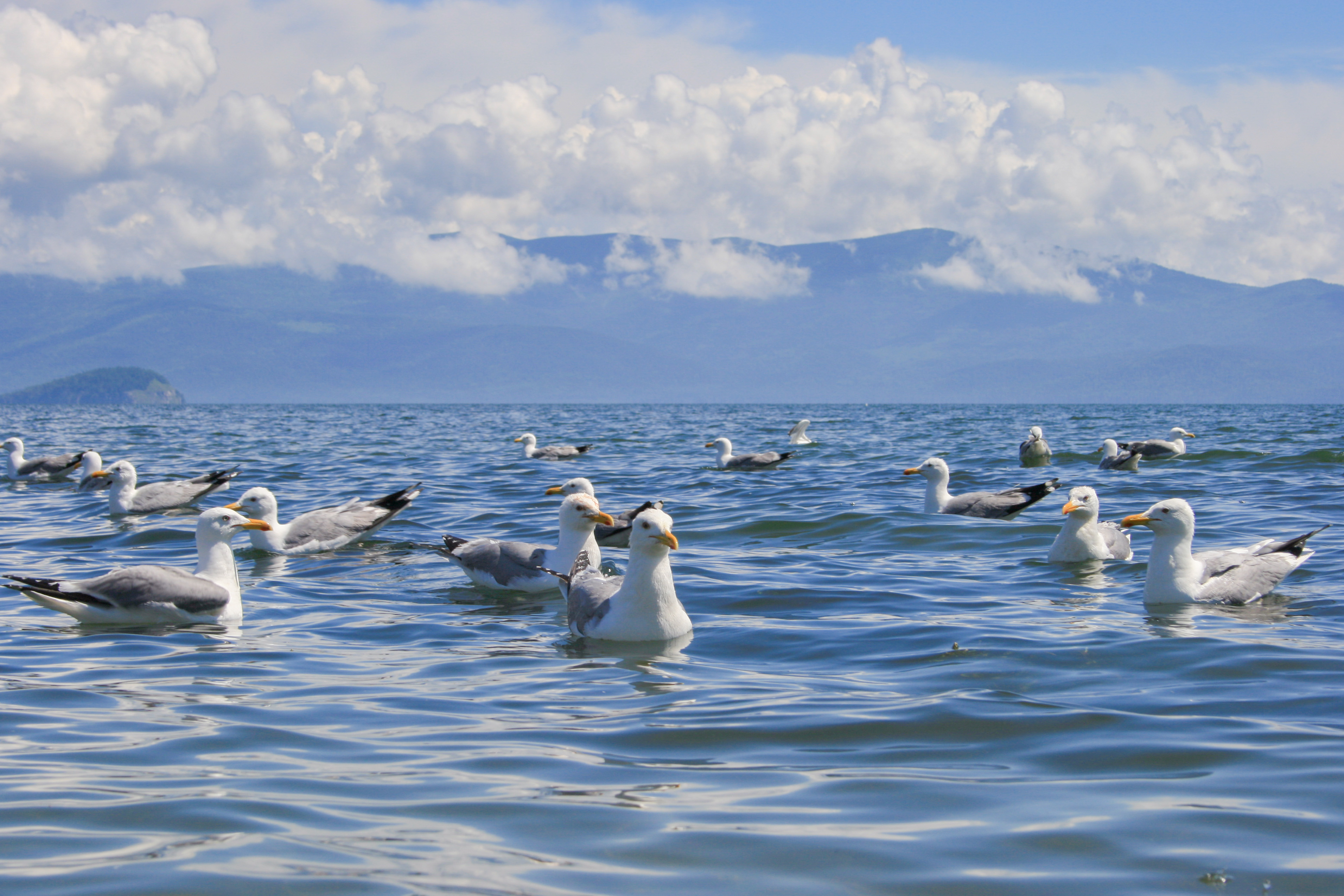
Mongolian gulls on Baikal

There are 236 species of birds that inhabit Lake Baikal, 29 of which are waterfowl. Although named after the lake, both the Baikal teal and Baikal bush warbler are widespread in eastern Asia.

=== Fish ===
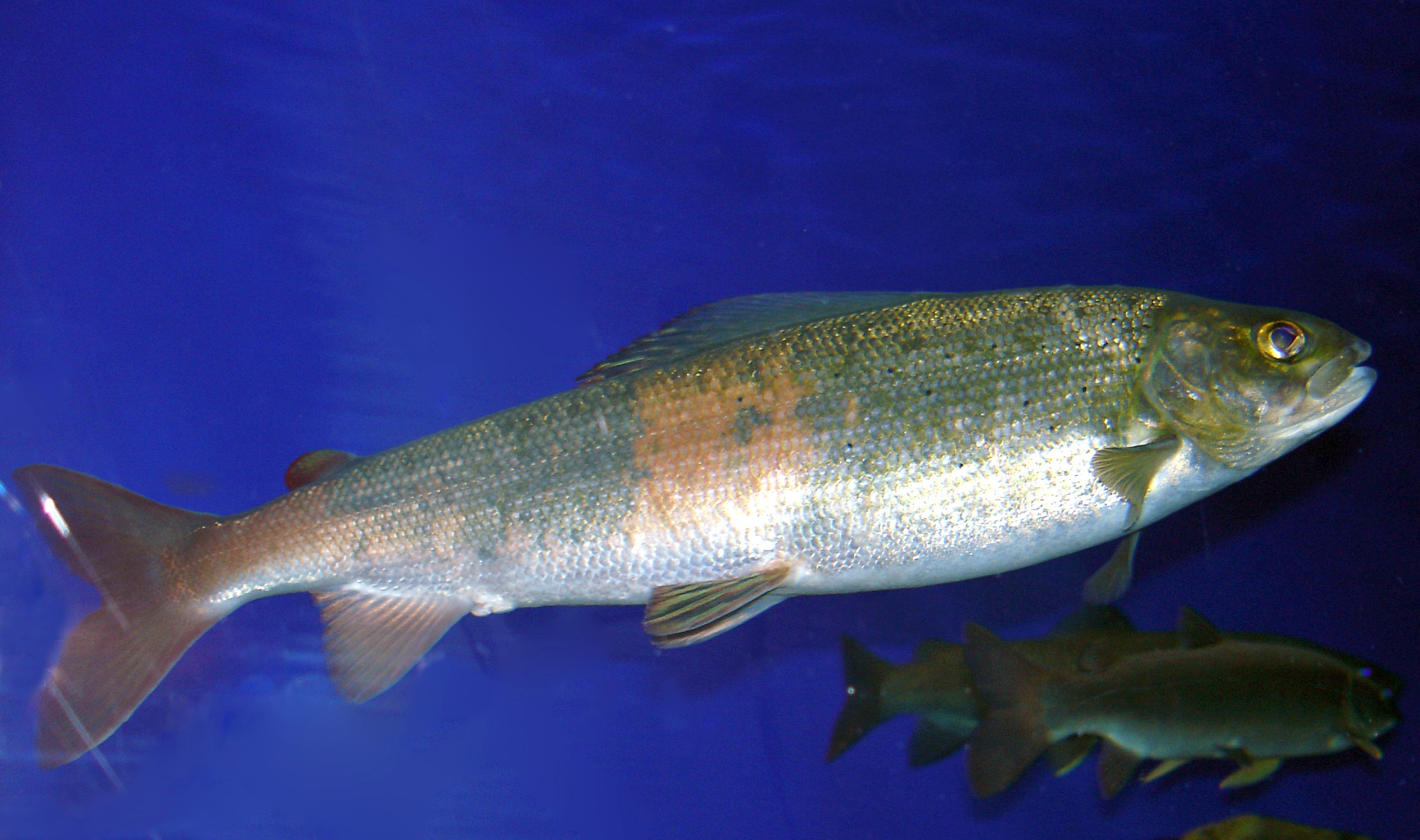
Two species of grayling (Thymallus baikalensis and T. brevipinnis) are found only in Baikal and rivers that drain into the lake.

Fewer than 65 native fish species occur in the lake basin, but more than half of these are endemic. The families Abyssocottidae (deep-water sculpins), Comephoridae (golomyankas or Baikal oilfish), and Cottocomephoridae (Baikal sculpins) are entirely restricted to the lake basin. All these are part of the Cottoidea and are typically less than 20 cm (8 in) long. Of particular note are the two species of golomyanka (Comephorus baicalensis and C. dybowskii). These long-finned, translucent fish typically live in open water at depths of 100–500 m (330–1,640 ft), but occur both shallower and much deeper. Together with certain abyssocottid sculpins, they are the deepest living freshwater fish in the world, occurring near the bottom of Lake Baikal. The golomyankas are the primary prey of the Baikal seal and represent the largest fish biomass in the lake. Beyond members of Cottoidea, there are few endemic fish species in the lake basin.

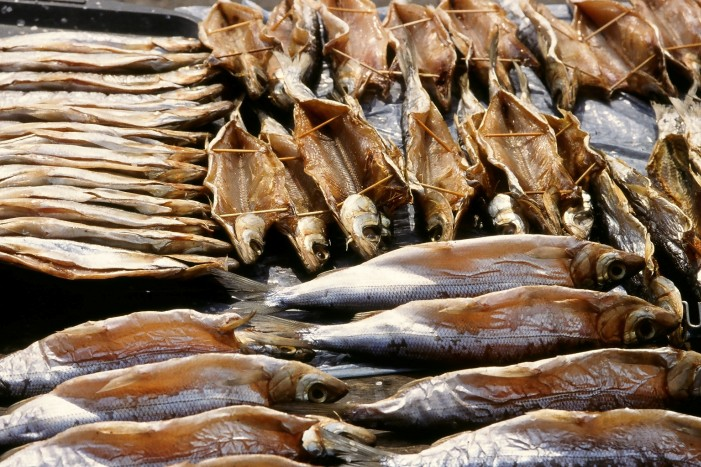
The omul (Coregonus migratorius) is endemic to Lake Baikal, and is a source of income to locals.

The most important local species for fisheries is the omul (Coregonus migratorius), an endemic whitefish. It is caught, smoked, and then sold widely in markets around the lake. Also, a second endemic whitefish inhabits the lake, C. baicalensis. The Baikal black grayling (Thymallus baicalensis), Baikal white grayling (T. brevipinnis), and Baikal sturgeon (Acipenser baerii baicalensis) are other important species with commercial value. They are also endemic to the Lake Baikal basin.

=== Invertebrates ===
The lake hosts a rich endemic fauna of invertebrates. Among the most diverse invertebrate groups are the amphipod and ostracod crustaceans, freshwater snails, annelid worms and turbellarian worms.

==== Crustaceans ====
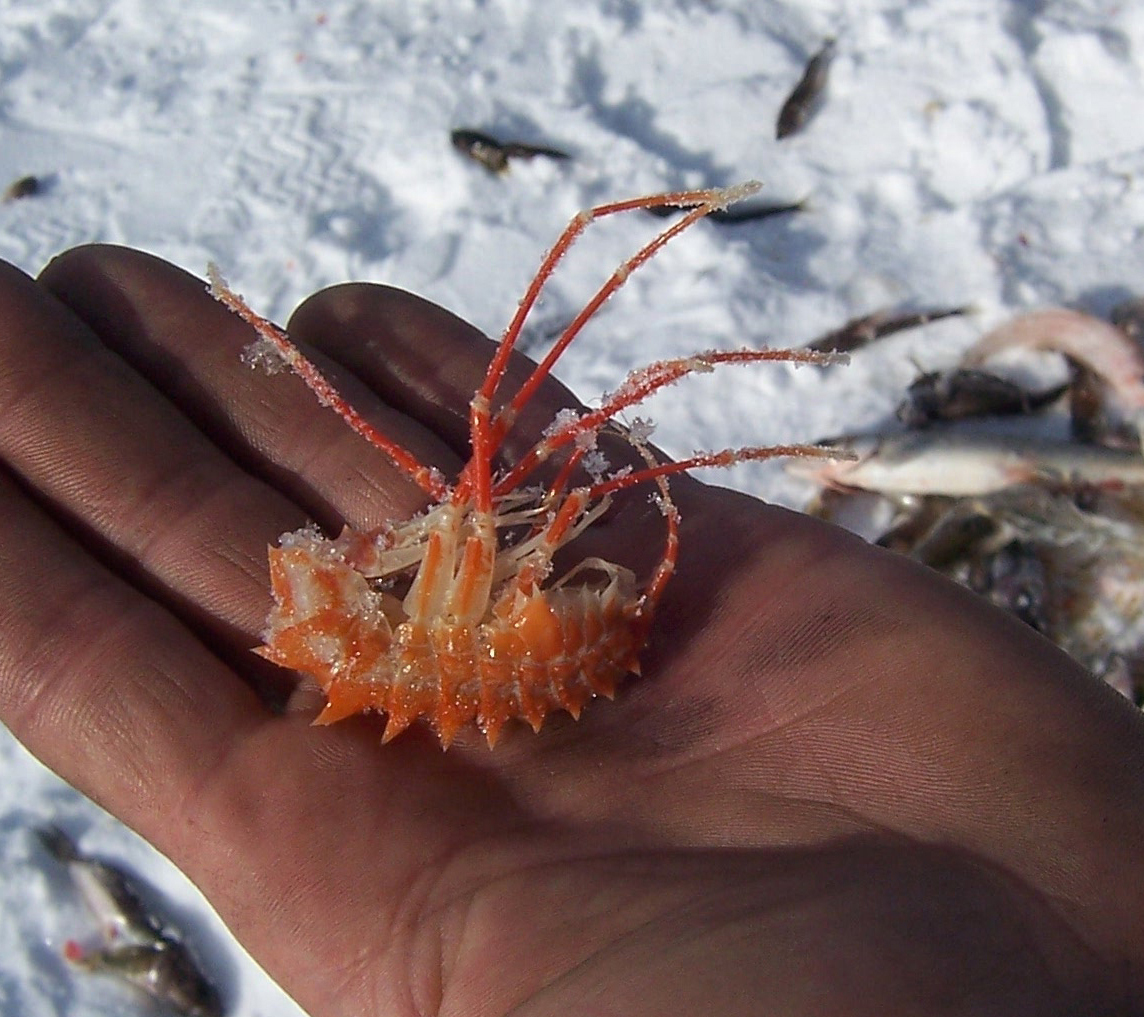
Brachyuropus reicherti (Acanthogammaridae), "giant" amphipod caught during ice fishing in the lake. This species is naturally red-orange in color

More than 350 species and subspecies of amphipods are endemic to the lake. They are exceptionally diverse in ecology and appearance, ranging from the pelagic Macrohectopus to the relatively large deep-water Abyssogammarus and Garjajewia, the tiny herbivorous Micruropus, and the parasitic Pachyschesis (parasitizing other amphipods). The "gigantism" of some Baikal amphipods, which has been compared to that seen in Antarctic amphipods, has been linked to the high level of dissolved oxygen in the lake. Among the "giants" are several species of spiny Acanthogammarus and Brachyuropus (Acanthogammaridae) found at both shallow and deep depths. These conspicuous and common amphipods are essentially carnivores (will also take detritus), and can reach a body length up to 7 cm (2.8 in). Another common species is another unique inhabitant of the lake: the pelagic amphipod Macrohectopus branickii lives its entire life in the water column, which is unique among freshwater amphipods and has been compared to krill. Statistical analysis of literature data reveals a moderate positive correlation between amphipod body length and habitat depth.

The number of isopods is low; all belonging to the family Asellidae. There are four species of the genus Baicalasellus, and the two species Mesoasellus dybowskii and Limnoasellus poberezhnii. These six endemic species are found on rocky substrata in depths varying from 3–10 meters (Baicalasellus angarensis) to more than hundred meters (Mesoasellus dybowskii).

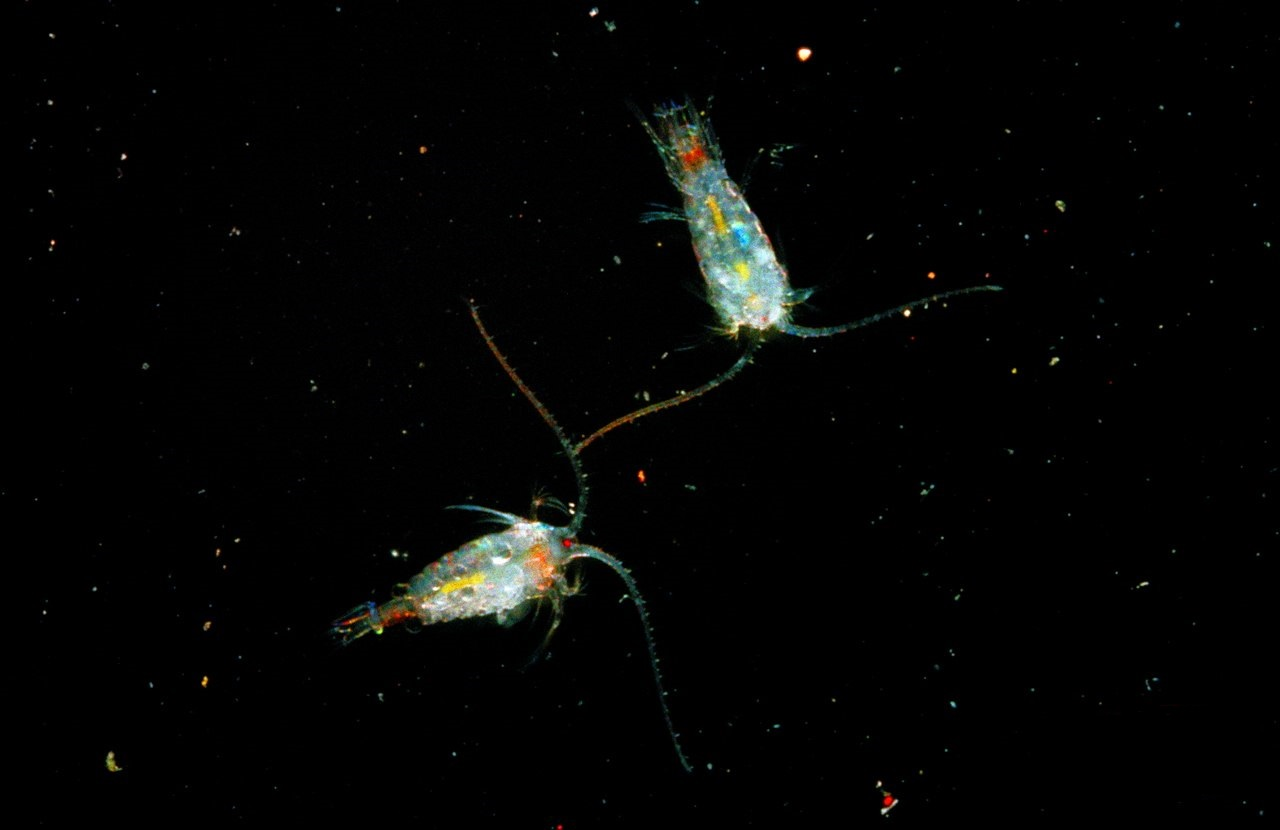
Epischurella baikalensis

Epischurella baikalensis is a copepod endemic to the lake, being a very abundant species there; it was estimated that they make up 80 to 90% of the total biomass. It is estimated that as a species, they filter as much as a thousand cubic kilometers of water a year, or the lake's entire volume every twenty-three years.

There are about 60 known species of native cladocerans (water fleas), several of them endemic.

Similar to another ancient lake, Tanganyika, Baikal is a center for ostracod diversity. About 90% of the Lake Baikal ostracods are endemic, meaning that there are around 200 endemic species. This makes it the second-most diverse group of crustacean in the lake, after the amphipods. The vast majority of the Baikal ostracods belong to the families Candonidae (more than 100 described species) and Cytherideidae (about 50 described species), but genetic studies indicate that the true diversity in at least the latter family has been heavily underestimated. The morphology of the Baikal ostracods is highly diverse.

==== Snails and bivalves ====
As of 2006, almost 150 freshwater snails are known from Lake Baikal, including 117 endemic species from the subfamilies Baicaliinae (part of the Amnicolidae) and Benedictiinae (part of the Lithoglyphidae), and the families Planorbidae and Valvatidae. All endemics have been recorded between 20 and 30 metres (66 and 98 ft), but the majority mainly live at shallower depths. About 30 freshwater snail species can be seen deeper than 100 m (330 ft), which represents the approximate limit of the sunlight zone, but only ten are truly deepwater species. In general, Baikal snails are thin-shelled and small. Two of the most common species are Benedictia baicalensis and Megalovalvata baicalensis. Bivalve diversity is lower with more than 30 species; about half of these, all in the families Euglesidae, Pisidiidae, and Sphaeriidae, are endemic (the only other family in the lake is the Unionidae with a single nonendemic species). The endemic bivalves are mainly found in shallows, with few species from deep water.

==== Aquatic worms ====
With almost 200 described species, including more than 160 endemics, the center of diversity for aquatic freshwater oligochaetes is Lake Baikal. A smaller number of other freshwater annelids is known: 30 species of leeches (Hirudinea), and 4 polychaetes. Several hundred species of nematodes are known from the lake, but a large percentage of these are undescribed.

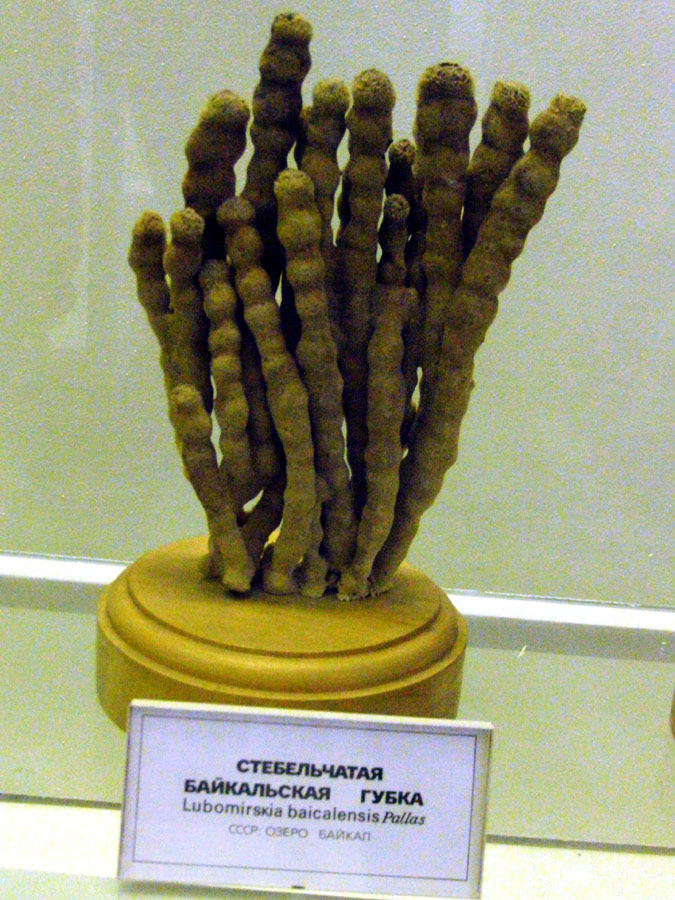
Museum specimen of the branching sponge Lubomirskia baicalensis (living are brighter green)

More than 140 endemic flatworm (Plathelminthes) species are in Lake Baikal, where they occur on a wide range of bottom types. Most of the flatworms are predatory, and some are relatively brightly marked. They are often abundant in shallow waters, where they are typically less than 2 cm (1 in) long, but in deeper parts of the lake, the largest, Baikaloplana valida, can reach up to 30 cm (1 ft) when outstretched.

==== Sponges ====
At least 18 species of sponges occur in the lake, including about 15 species from the endemic family Lubomirskiidae (the remaining are from the nonendemic family Spongillidae), which colonized the lake about 3.4 million years ago. The lake's sponges makes up around 44% of the benthic animal biomass. Lubomirskia baicalensis, Baikalospongia bacillifera, and B. intermedia are unusually large for freshwater sponges and can reach 1 m (3.3 ft) or more. These three are also the most common sponges in the lake. While the Baikalospongia species typically have encrusting or carpet-like structures, L. baikalensis often has branching structures and in areas where common may form underwater "forests". Most sponges in the lake are typically green when alive because of symbiotic chlorophytes (zoochlorella), but can also be brownish or yellowish.

== Relation to humans ==
=== History ===
The Baikal area, sometimes known as Baikalia, has a long history of human habitation. Near the village of Mal'ta, some 160 km northwest of the lake, remains of a young human male known as "MA-1" or "Mal'ta Boy" are indications of local habitation by the Mal'ta–Buret' culture ca. 24,000 BP. An early known tribe in the area was the Kurykans.

Located in the former northern territory of the Xiongnu confederation, Lake Baikal is one site of the Han–Xiongnu War, where the armies of the Han dynasty pursued and defeated the Xiongnu forces from the second century BC to the first century AD. They recorded that the lake was a "huge sea" (hanhai) and designated it the North Sea (Běihǎi) of the semimythical Four Seas. The Kurykans, a Siberian tribe who inhabited the area in the sixth century, gave it a name that translates to "much water". Later on, it was called "natural lake" (Baygal nuur) by the Buryats and "rich lake" (Bay göl) by the Yakuts. Lake Baikal was under the Anbei Protectorate of the Tang dynasty from 647 CE to 682 CE.

Little was known to Europeans about the lake until Russia expanded into the area in the 1600s.

==== As part of Russia ====
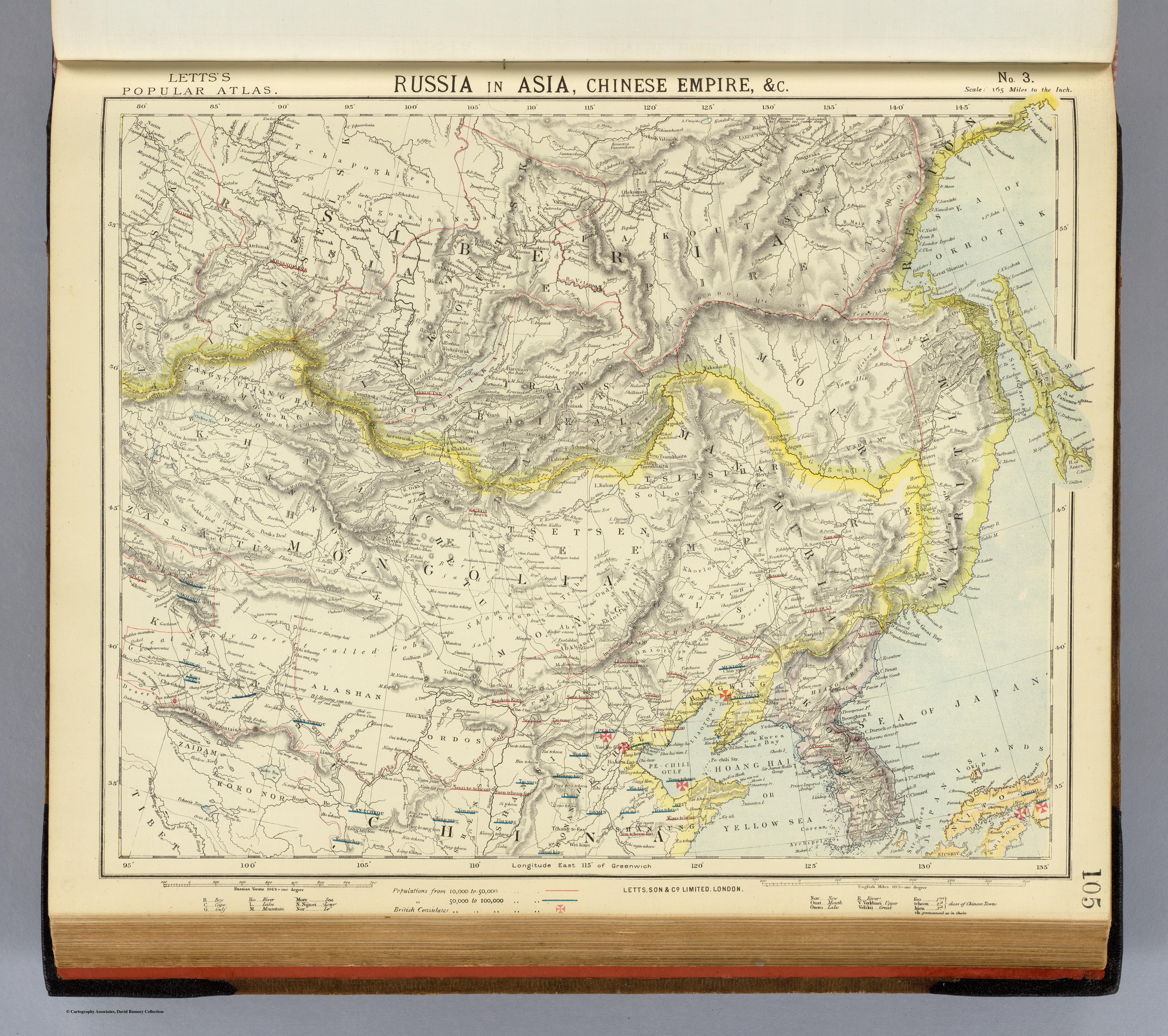
An 1883 British map using the More Baikal (Baikal Sea) designation, rather than the conventional Ozero Baikal (Lake Baikal).

Russian expansion into the Buryat area around Lake Baikal in 1628–1658 was part of the Russian conquest of Siberia. It was done first by following the Angara River upstream from Yeniseysk (founded 1619) and later by moving south from the Lena River. Russians first heard of the Buryats in 1609 at Tomsk. According to folktales related a century after the fact, in 1623, Demid Pyanda, who may have been the first Russian to reach the Lena, crossed from the upper Lena to the Angara and arrived at Yeniseysk.

The Russian explorers Vikhor Savin (1624) and Maksim Perfilyev (1626 and 1627–28) explored Tungus country on the lower Angara. To the west, Krasnoyarsk on the upper Yenisei was founded in 1627. A number of ill-documented (poorly recorded) expeditions explored eastward from Krasnoyarsk. In 1628, Pyotr Beketov first encountered a group of Buryats and collected yasak (tribute) from them at the future site of Bratsk. In 1629, Yakov Khripunov set off from Tomsk to find a rumored silver mine. His men soon began plundering both Russians and natives. They were joined by another band of rioters from Krasnoyarsk, but left the Buryat country when they ran short of food. This made it difficult for other Russians to enter the area. In 1631, Maksim Perfilyev built an ostrog at Bratsk. The pacification was moderately successful, but in 1634, Bratsk was destroyed and its garrison killed. In 1635, Bratsk was restored by a punitive expedition under Radukovskii. In 1638, it was besieged unsuccessfully. In 1638, Perfilyev crossed from the Angara over the Ilim portage to the Lena River and went downstream as far as Olyokminsk. Returning, he sailed up the Vitim River into the area east of Lake Baikal (1640) where he heard reports of the Amur country. In 1641, Verkholensk was founded on the upper Lena.

In 1643, Kurbat Ivanov went further up the Lena and became the first European to see Lake Baikal and Olkhon Island. Half his party under Skorokhodov remained on the lake, reached the Upper Angara at its northern tip, and wintered on the Barguzin River on the northeast side.

In 1644, Ivan Pokhabov went up the Angara to Baikal, becoming perhaps the first Russian to use this route, which is difficult because of the rapids. He crossed the lake and explored the lower Selenge River. About 1647, he repeated the trip, obtained guides, and visited a 'Tsetsen Khan' near Ulaanbaatar. In 1648, Ivan Galkin built an ostrog on the Barguzin River which became a center for eastward expansion. In 1652, Vasily Kolesnikov reported from Barguzin that one could reach the Amur country by following the Selenga, Uda, and Khilok Rivers to the future sites of Chita and Nerchinsk.

In the past, the Baikal was referred to by many Russians as the "Baikal Sea" (море Байкал, More Baikal), rather than merely "Lake Baikal" (озеро Байкал, Ozero Baikal). This usage is attested already in the Life of Protopope Avvakum (1621–1682), and on the late-17th-century maps by Semyon Remezov. It is also attested in the famous song, now passed into the tradition, that opens with the words Славное море, священный Байкал (Glorious sea, [the] sacred Bajkal). To this day, the strait between the western shore of the Lake and the Olkhon Island is called "Maloye More" (Малое море), i.e. "the Little Sea". Lake Baikal is nicknamed "Older sister of Sister Lakes (its sister being Lake Khövsgöl)".

The Trans-Siberian Railway was built between 1896 and 1902. Construction of the scenic railway around the southwestern end of Lake Baikal required 200 bridges and 33 tunnels. Until its completion, a train ferry, the SS Baikal, transported railcars across the lake from Port Baikal to Mysovaya for a number of years. As the railway was built, a large hydrogeographical expedition headed by F.K. Drizhenko produced the first detailed contour map of the lake bed.

The lake became the site of the minor military engagement between the Czechoslovak legion and the Red Army in 1918. At times during winter freezes, the lake could be crossed on foot, though at risk of frostbite and deadly hypothermia from the cold wind moving unobstructed across flat expanses of ice. In the winter of 1920, the Great Siberian Ice March occurred, when the retreating White Russian Army crossed frozen Lake Baikal. The wind on the exposed lake was so cold, many people died, freezing in place until spring thaw. Beginning in 1956, the impounding of the Irkutsk Dam on the Angara River raised the level of the lake by 1.4 m (4.6 ft).

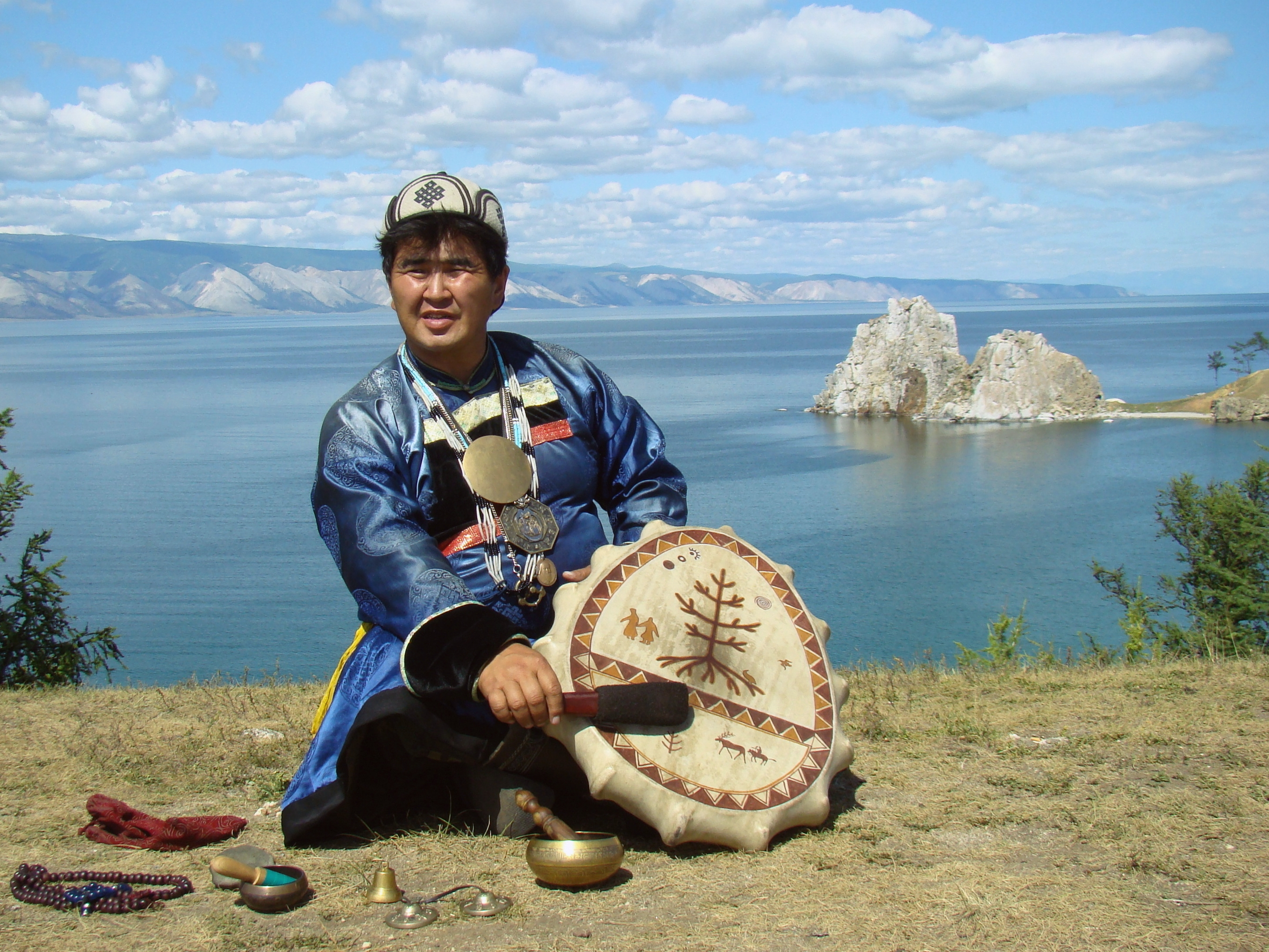
Buryat shaman on Olkhon Island

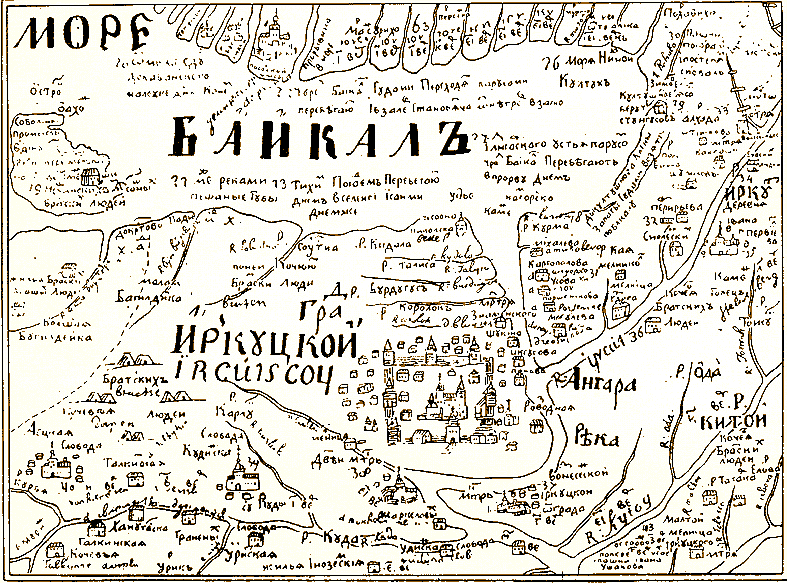
Russian map c. 1700, Baikal (not to scale) is at top.

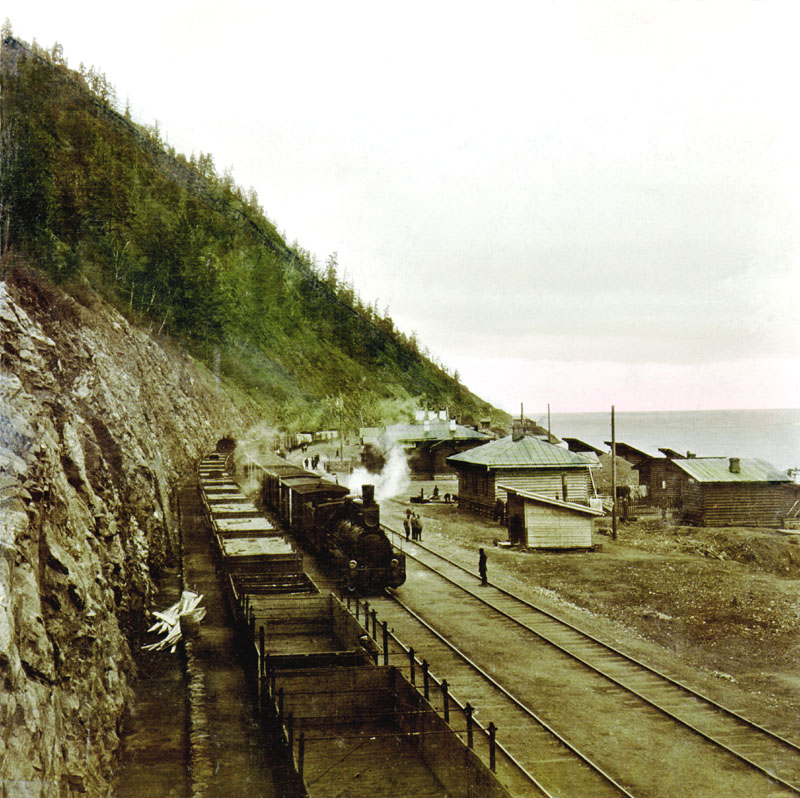
Steam locomotive on the Circum-Baikal Railroad

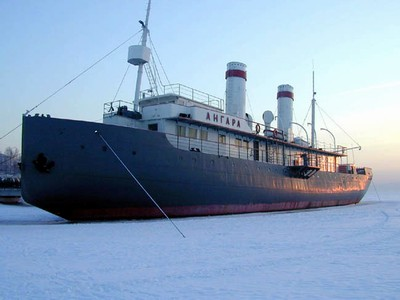
Angara was launched in 1900 and is one of the oldest surviving icebreakers.

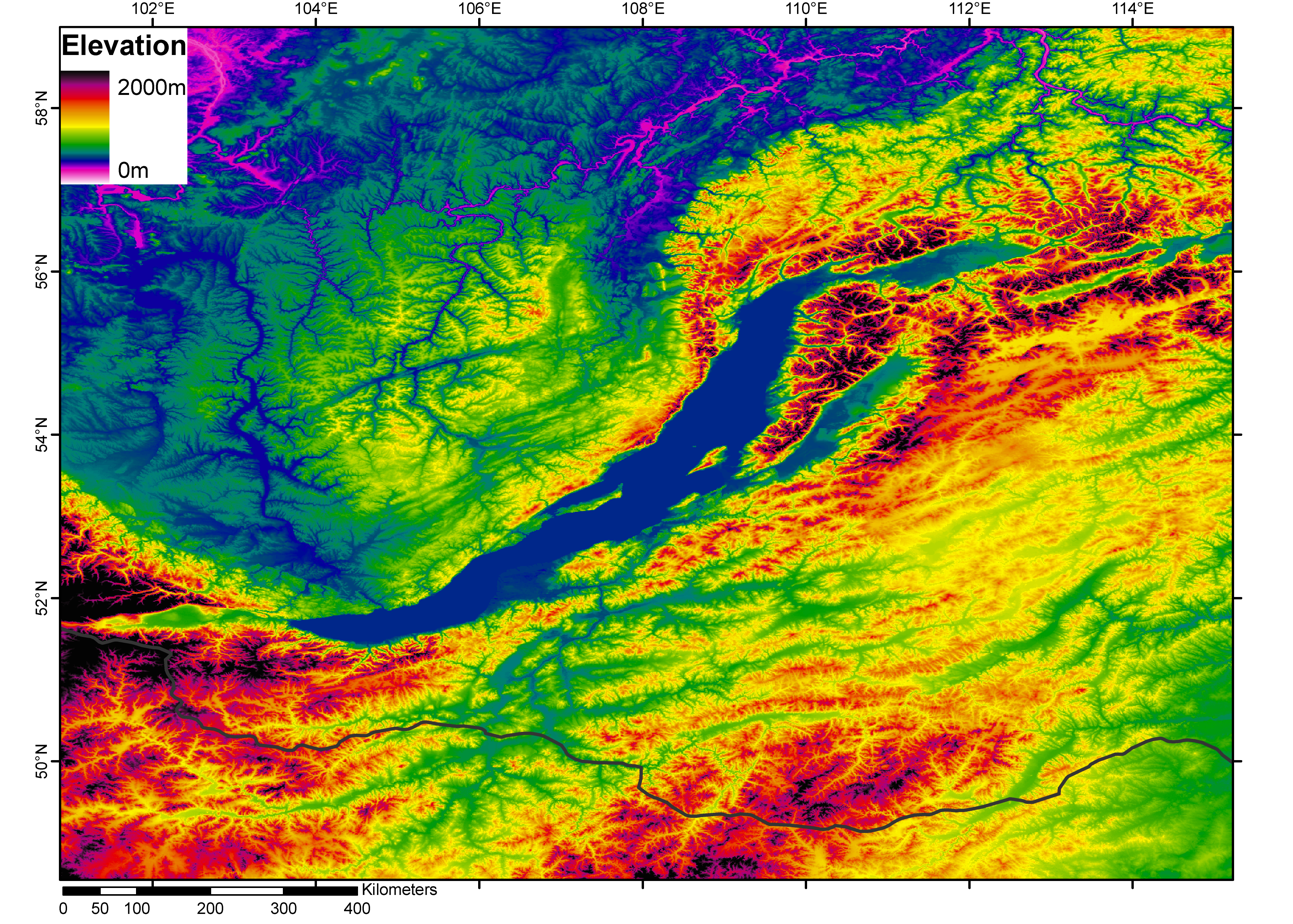
A digital elevation model of the Lake Baikal region, NOAA 2006

=== Research ===
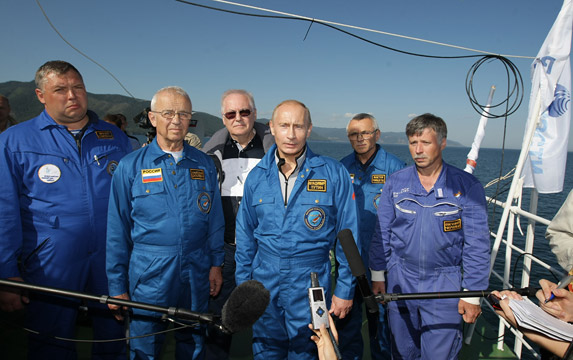
Vladimir Putin giving an interview after completion of the dive aboard Mir-1

Several organizations are carrying out natural research projects on Lake Baikal. Most of them are governmental or associated with governmental organizations. The Baikalian Research Centre is an independent research organization carrying out environmental, educational and research projects at Lake Baikal.

In July 2008, Russia sent two small submersibles, Mir-1 and Mir-2, to descend 1,592 m (5,223 ft) to the bottom of Lake Baikal to conduct geological and biological tests on its unique ecosystem. Although originally reported as being successful, they did not set a world record for the deepest freshwater dive, reaching a depth of only 1,580 m (5,180 ft). That record is currently held by Anatoly Sagalevich, at 1,637 m (5,371 ft) (also in Lake Baikal aboard a Pisces submersible in 1990). Russian scientist and federal politician Artur Chilingarov, the leader of the mission, took part in the Mir dives alongside Russian president Vladimir Putin.

Since 1993, neutrino research has been conducted at the Baikal Deep Underwater Neutrino Telescope (BDUNT). The Baikal Neutrino Telescope NT-200 is being deployed in Lake Baikal, 3.6 km (2.2 mi) from shore at a depth of 1.1 km (0.68 mi). It consists of 192 optical modules.

=== Economy ===
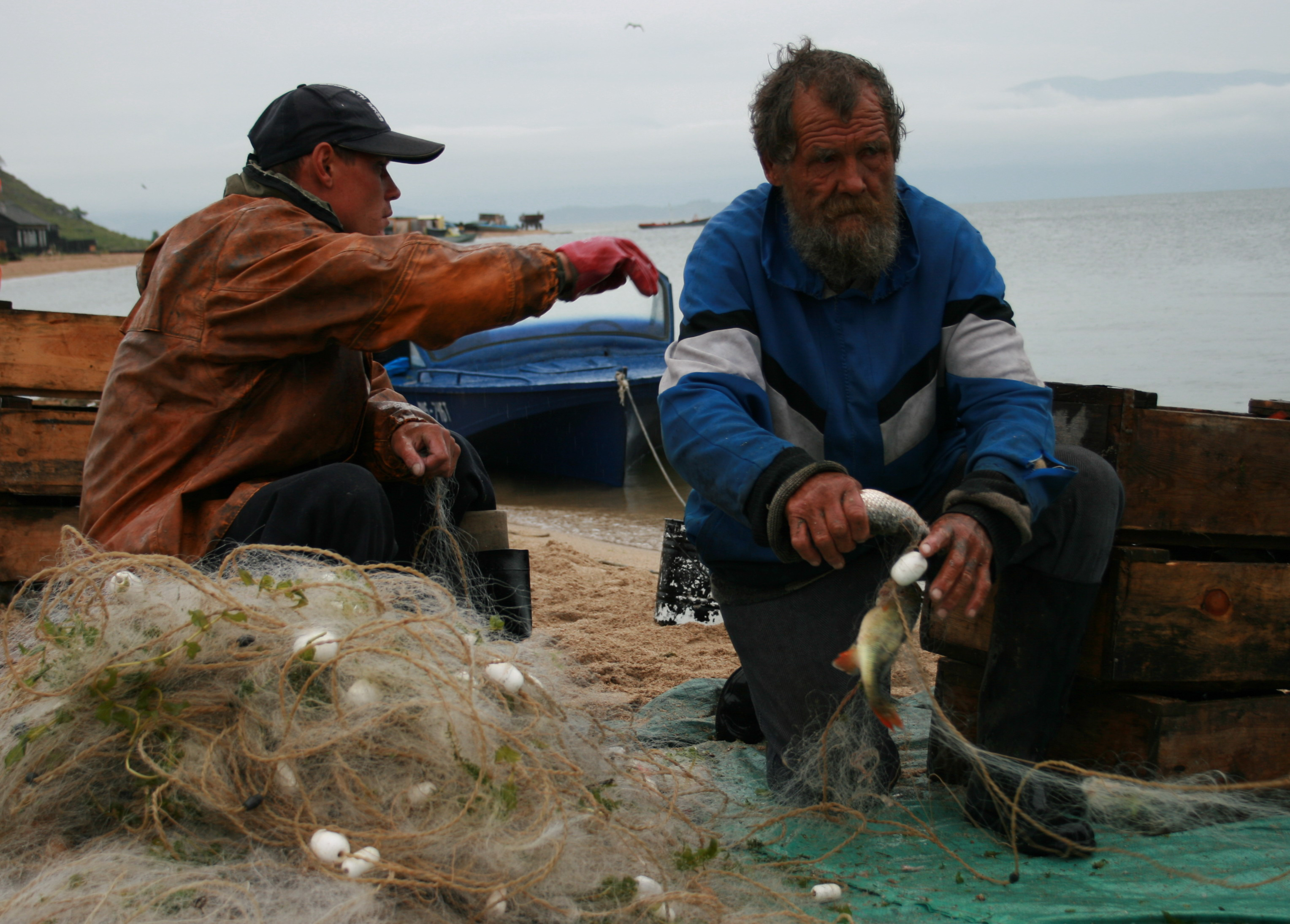
Baikal fishermen fish for 15 commercially used species. The omul, found only in Baikal, accounts for most of the catch.

The lake, nicknamed "the Pearl of Siberia", drew investors from the tourist industry as energy revenues sparked an economic boom. Viktor Grigorov's Grand Baikal in Irkutsk is one of the investors, who planned to build three hotels, creating 570 jobs. In 2007, the Russian government declared the Baikal region a special economic zone. A popular resort in Listvyanka is home to the seven-story Hotel Mayak. At the northern part of the lake, Baikalplan (a German NGO) built together with Russians in 2009 the Frolikha Adventure Coastline Track, a 100-kilometre-long (62 mi) long-distance trail as an example for sustainable development of the region. Baikal was also declared a UNESCO World Heritage site in 1996. Rosatom plans to build a laboratory near Baikal, in conjunction with an international uranium plant and to invest $2.5 billion in the region and create 2,000 jobs in the city of Angarsk.

Lake Baikal is a popular destination among tourists from all over the world. According to the Russian Federal State Statistics Service, in 2013, 79,179 foreign tourists visited Irkutsk and Lake Baikal; in 2014, 146,937 visitors. The most popular places to stay by the lake are Listvyanka village, Olkhon Island, Kotelnikovsky cape, Baykalskiy Priboi, resort Khakusy and Turka village. The popularity of Lake Baikal is growing from year to year, but there is no developed infrastructure in the area.

The ice road to Olkhon Island is the only legal ice road on Lake Baikal. The route is prepared by specialists every year and it opens when the ice conditions allow it. In 2015, the ice road to Olkhon was open from 17 February to 23 March. The thickness of the ice on the road is about 60 cm (24 in), maximum capacity allowed—10 t (9.8 long tons; 11 short tons); it is open to the public from 9 a.m. to 6 p.m. The road through the lake is 12 km (7.5 mi) long and it goes from the village Kurkut on the mainland to Irkutskaya Guba on Olkhon Island.

=== Ecotourism ===
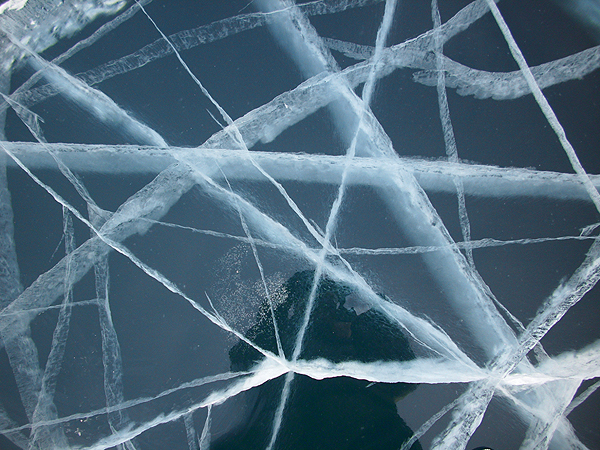
Cracks in Baikal ice

Baikal has a number of different tourist activities, depending on the season. Generally, Baikal has two top tourist seasons. The first season is ice season, which starts usually in mid-January and lasts till mid-April. During this season ice depth increases up to 140 centimeters, that allows safe vehicle driving on the ice cover (except heavy vehicles, such as tourist buses, that do not take this risk). This allows access to the figures of ice that are formed at rocky banks of Olkhon Island, including Cape Hoboy, the Three Brothers rock, and caves to the north of Khuzhir. It also provides access to small islands like Ogoy Island and Zamogoy.

The ice itself has a transparency of one meter depth. That is why this season is popular for hiking, ice-walking, ice-skating, and bicycle riding. An ice route around Olkhon is around 200 km.

The ice season ends in mid-April. Owing to increasing temperatures ice starts to melt and becomes shallow and fragile, especially in places with strong under-ice flows. A range of factors contribute to an increased risk of falling through the ice towards the end of the season, resulting in multiple deaths in Russia each year, although exact data for Baikal are unknown. Viktor Viktorovych Yanukovych, son of former Ukrainian President Viktor Yanukovych, reportedly died after his car fell through the ice while driving on Baikal in 2015.

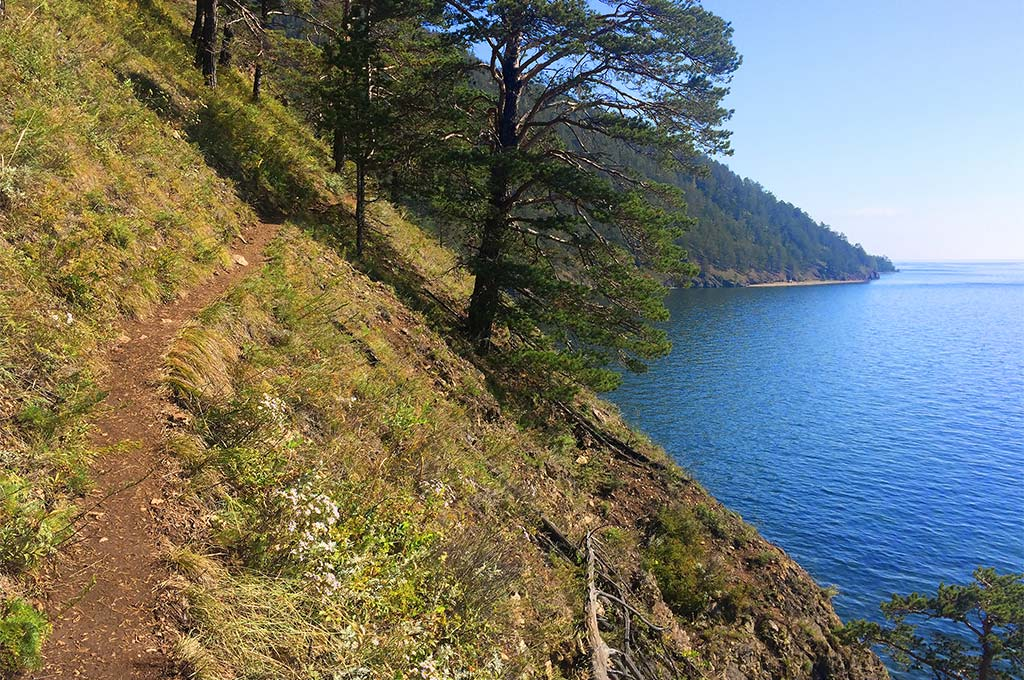
Great Baikal Trail goes from Listvyanka to Bolshoe Goloustnoye along Lake Baikal coast.

The second tourist season is summer, which lets tourists dive deeper into virgin Baikal nature. Hiking trails become open, many of them cross two mountain ranges: Baikal Range on the western side and Barguzin Range on the eastern side of Baikal.

Small tourist vessels operate in the area, availing bird-watching, animal-watching (especially Baikal seal), and fishing. Water in the lake stays extremely cold in most places (does not exceed 10 °C most of the year), but in a few gulfs like Chivirkuy, it can be comfortable for swimming.

Olkhon's most-populated village Khuzhir is an ecotourist destination. Baikal has always been popular in Russia and CIS-countries, but in 2014 Baikal saw an influx of visitors from China and Europe.

==== Scuba diving ====
There are several technical dive centers near Lake Baikal that offer guided tours to interested divers. The oldest of these, Dive Center Sval, offers an annual camp to provide training at various levels.

The world record depth for freediving under ice was set by Alexey Molchanov in Lake Baikal in 2026 with a descent to 91m.

=== Environmental concerns ===
Environmentalists have previously acknowledged pollution at Lake Baikal. It faces a series of detrimental phenomena including the decline of the omul fish, the rapid growth of putrid algae and the death of endemic species of sponges across its area. Environmental advocacy for the lake began in the late 1950s. Since 2010, more than 15,000 metric tons of toxic waste have flowed into the lake.

==== Baykalsk Pulp and Paper Mill ====
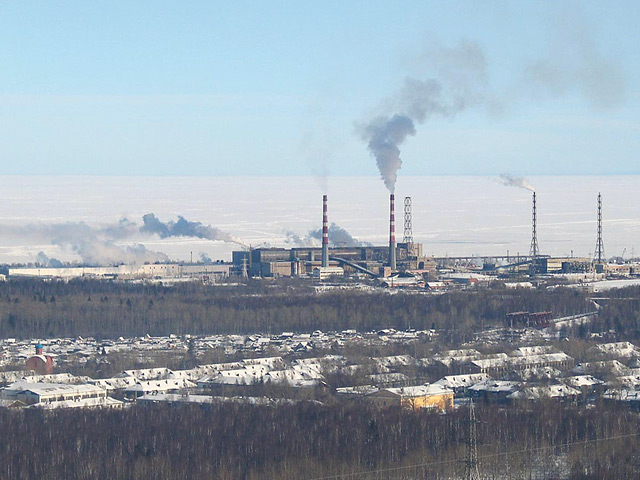
Baykalsk Pulp and Paper Mill in 2008

The Baykalsk Pulp and Paper Mill was constructed in 1966, directly on the shoreline of Lake Baikal. The plant bleached paper using chlorine and discharged waste directly into Lake Baikal. The decision to construct the plant on Lake Baikal resulted in strong protests from Soviet scientists; according to them, the ultra-pure water of the lake was a significant resource and should have been used for innovative chemical production (for instance, the production of high-quality viscose for the aeronautics and space industries). The Soviet scientists felt that it was irrational to change Lake Baikal's water quality by beginning paper production on the shore. It was their position that it was also necessary to preserve endemic species of local biota, and to maintain the area around Lake Baikal as a recreation zone. However, the objections of the Soviet scientists faced opposition from the industrial lobby and only after decades of protest, the plant was closed in November 2008 due to unprofitability.

On 4 January 2010, production was resumed. On 13 January 2010, Russian Prime Minister Vladimir Putin introduced changes in legislation legalising the operation of the plant; this action brought about a wave of protests from ecologists and local residents. These changes were based on the determination Prime Minister Putin made through a visual verification of Lake Baikal's condition from a miniature submarine, where he said: "I could see with my own eyes—and scientists can confirm—Baikal is in good condition and there is practically no pollution". Despite this, in September 2013, the mill underwent a final bankruptcy, with the last 800 workers slated to lose their jobs by 28 December 2013. The mill has since shut down, though its reservoirs of lignin sludge remain an environmental hazard.

==== Cancelled East Siberia–Pacific Ocean oil pipeline ====
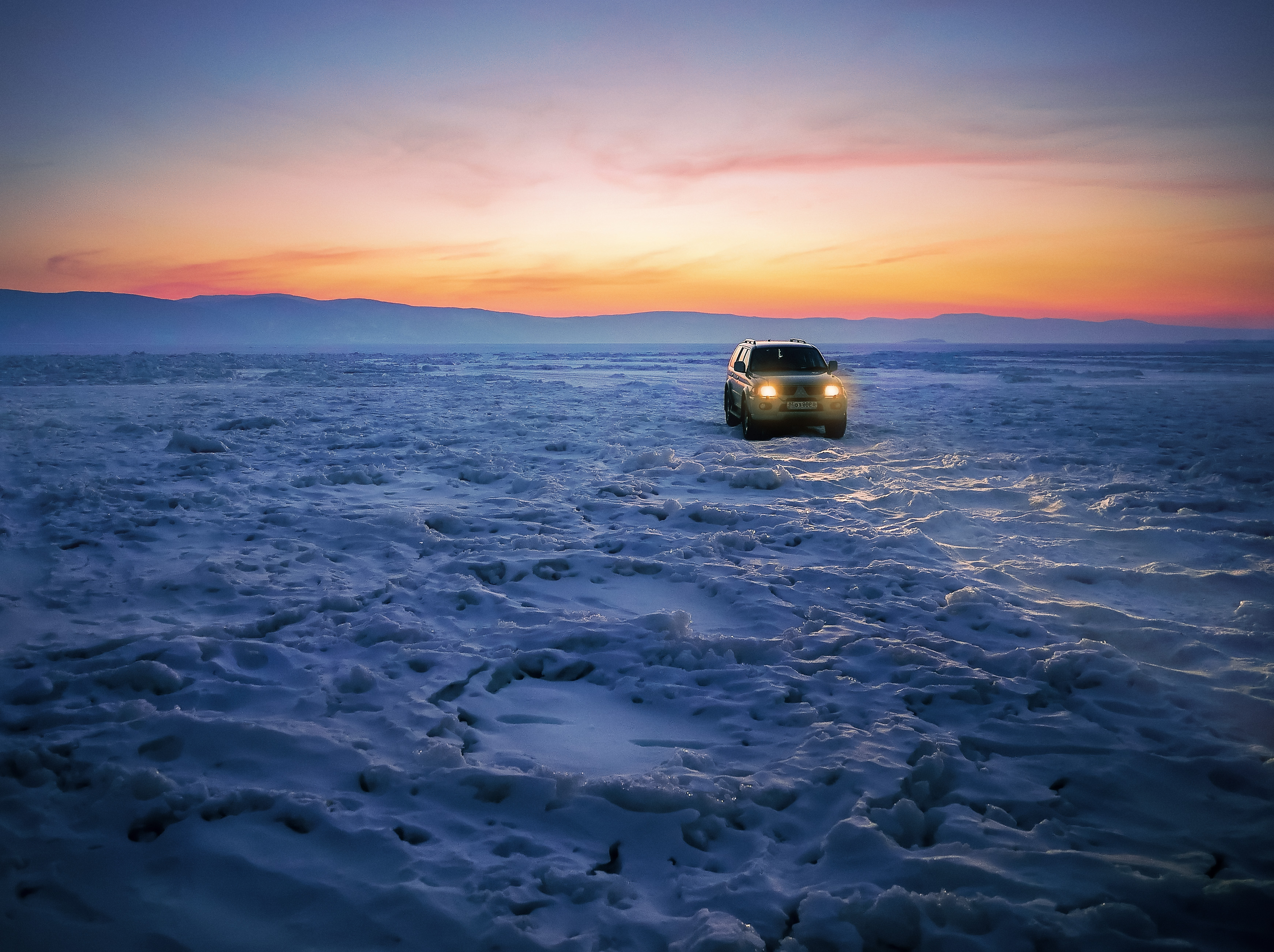
The lake in winter; its ice thick enough to support a 2004 Mitsubishi Pajero

Russian oil pipelines state company Transneft was planning to build a trunk pipeline that would have come within 800 m (2,600 ft) of the lake shore in a zone of substantial seismic activity. Environmental activists in Russia, Greenpeace, Baikal pipeline opposition and local citizens were strongly opposed to these plans, due to the possibility of an accidental oil spill that might cause significant damage to the environment. According to the Transneft's president, numerous meetings with citizens near the lake were held in towns along the route, especially in Irkutsk. Transneft agreed to alter its plans when Russian president Vladimir Putin ordered the company to consider an alternative route 40 kilometers (25 mi) to the north to avoid such ecological risks. Transneft has since decided to move the pipeline away from Lake Baikal, so that it will not pass through any federal or republic natural reserves. Work began on the pipeline two days after President Putin agreed to changing the route away from Lake Baikal.

==== Proposed uranium enrichment center ====
In 2006, the Russian government announced plans to build the world's first international uranium enrichment center at an existing nuclear facility in Angarsk, a city on the river Angara some 95 km (59 mi) downstream from the lake's shores. Critics and environmentalists argued it would be a disaster for the region and were urging the government to reconsider.

After enrichment, only 10% of the uranium-derived radioactive material would be exported to international customers, leaving 90% near the Lake Baikal region for storage. Uranium tailings contain radioactive and toxic materials, which if improperly stored, are potentially dangerous to humans and can contaminate rivers and lakes.

The enrichment center was constructed in the 2010s.

==== Chinese-owned bottled water plant ====
Chinese-owned AquaSib had been purchasing land alongside the lake and in 2019 started building a bottling plant and pipeline in the town of Kultuk. The goal was to export 190 million liters of water to China even though the lake had been experiencing historically low water levels. This spurred protests by the local population that the lake would be drained of its water, at which point the local government halted the plans pending analysis.

==== Other pollution sources ====
According to The Moscow Times and Vice, an increasing number of an invasive species of algae thrive in the lake from hundreds of tons of liquid waste, including fuel and excrement, regularly disposed into the lake by tourist sites, and up to 25,000 tons of liquid waste are disposed of every year by local ships.

=== In culture ===
According to 19th-century traveler T. W. Atkinson, locals in the Lake Baikal Region held the belief that Jesus Christ had visited the area:

The people have a tradition in connection with this region which they implicitly believe. They say "that Christ visited this part of Asia and ascended this summit, whence he looked down on all the region around. After blessing the country to the northward, he turned towards the south, and looking across the Baikal, he waved his hand, exclaiming 'Beyond this there is nothing.' Thus they account for the sterility of Daouria, where it is said "no corn will grow."

Lake Baikal has been celebrated in Russian folk songs. Two of these songs are known in Russia and its neighboring countries, such as Japan.

- "Glorious Sea, Sacred Baikal" (Славное мope, священный Байкал) is about a katorga fugitive. The lyrics as documented and edited in the 19th century by Dmitriy P. Davydov (1811–1888). See "Barguzin River" for sample lyrics.
- "The Wanderer" (Бродяга) is about a convict who had escaped from jail and was attempting to return home from Transbaikal. The lyrics were collected and edited in the 20th century by Ivan Kondratyev.

The latter song was a secondary theme song for the Soviet Union's second color film, Ballad of Siberia (1947; Сказание о земле Сибирской).

Chasm, an episode of the fiction anthology podcast Knifepoint Horror, is set in Lake Baikal.

== Gallery ==
Shores of Baikal

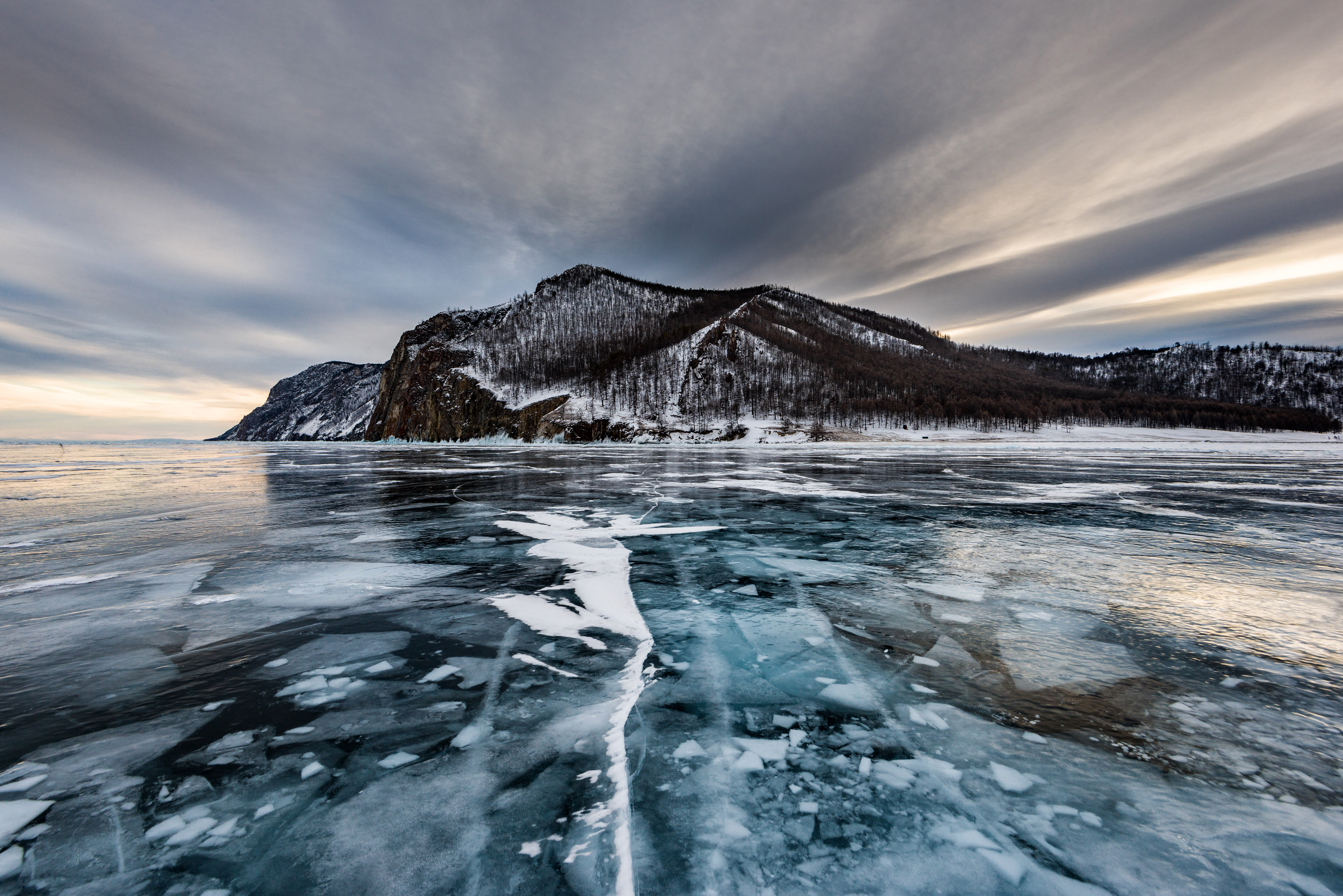
Frozen lake Baikal near Olkhon Island

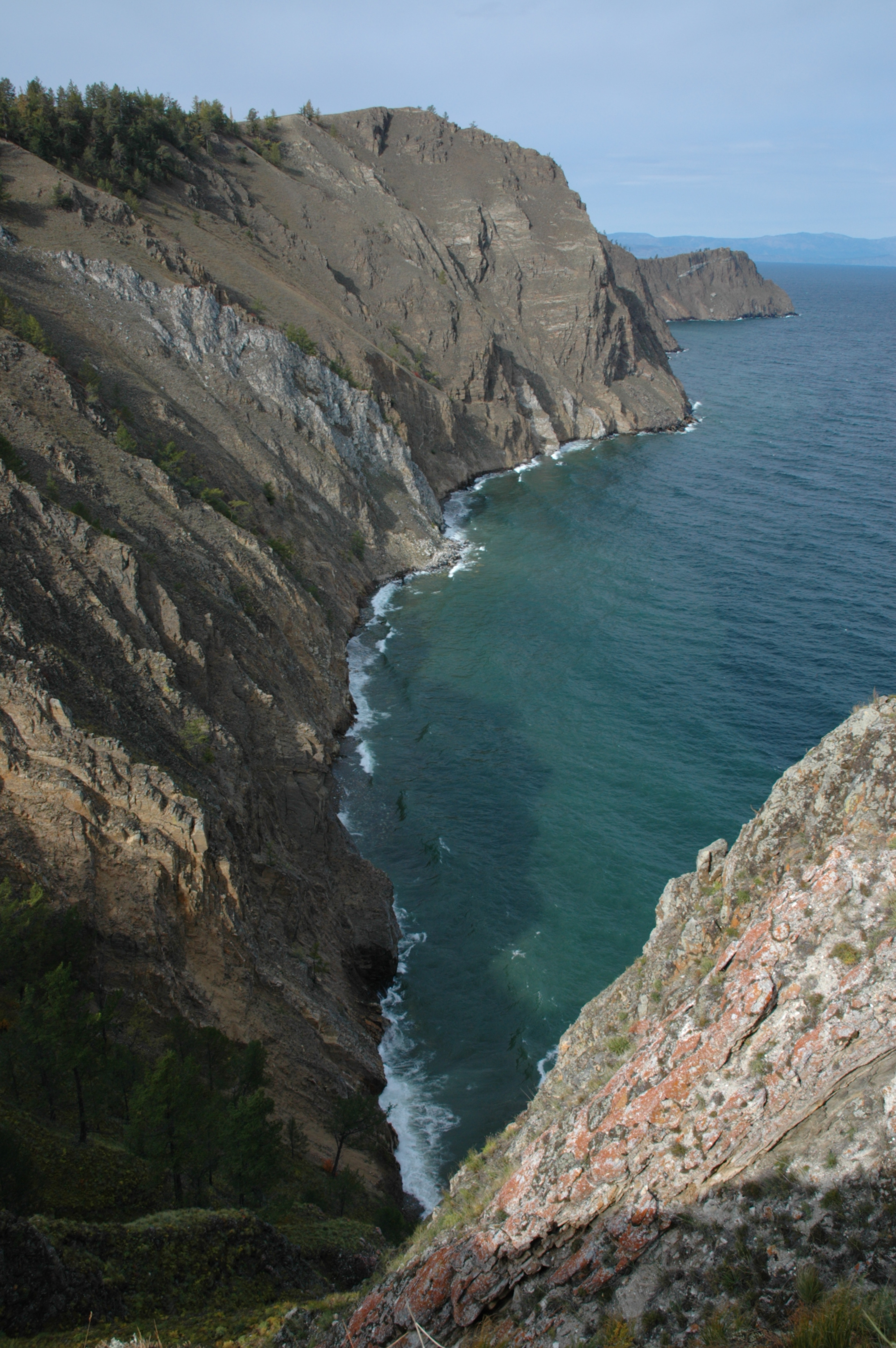
Cliffs on Olkhon Island

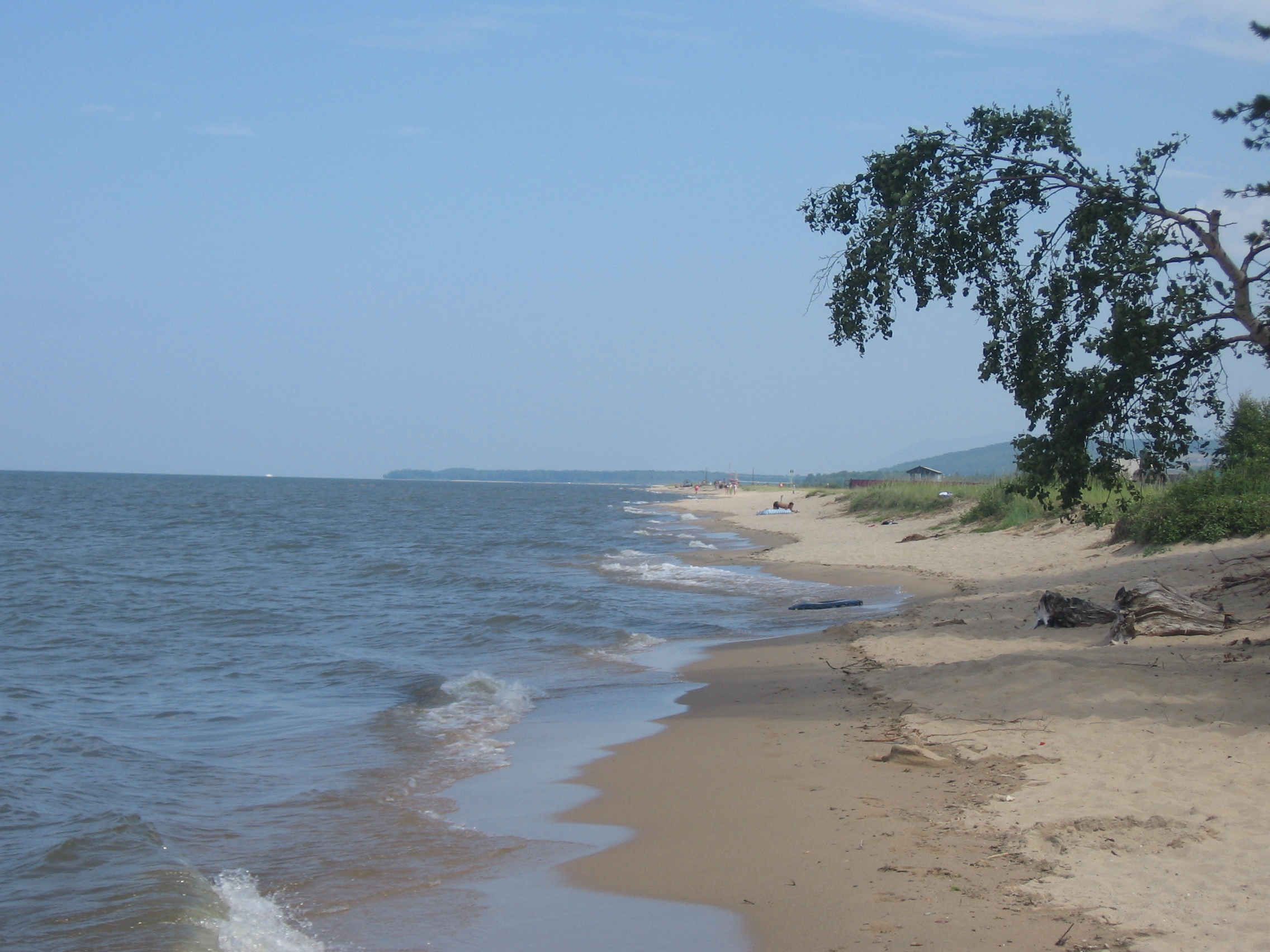
A sandy beach in the Kabansky District

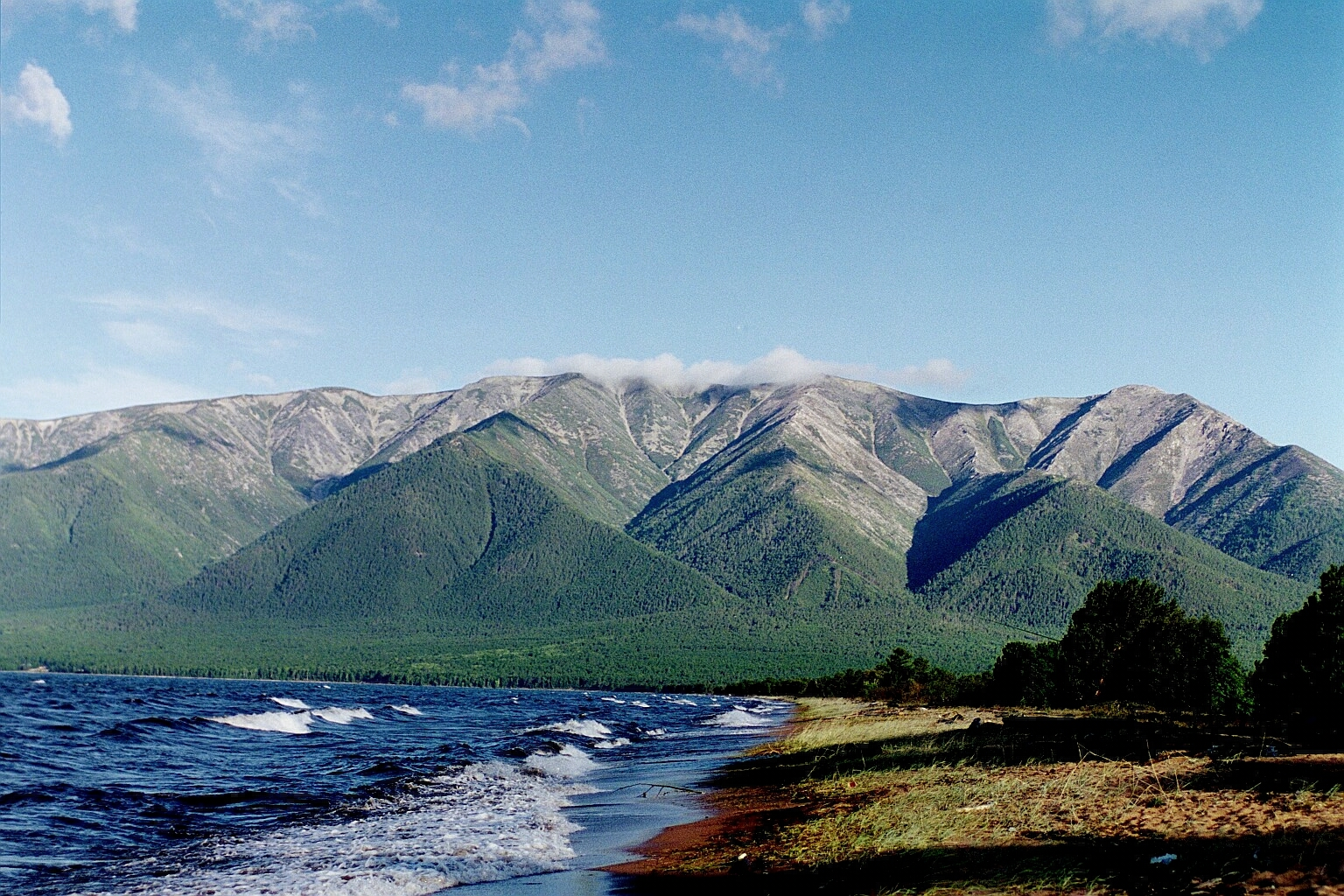
Mountains on the Svyatoy Nos Peninsula, Zabaykalsky National Park

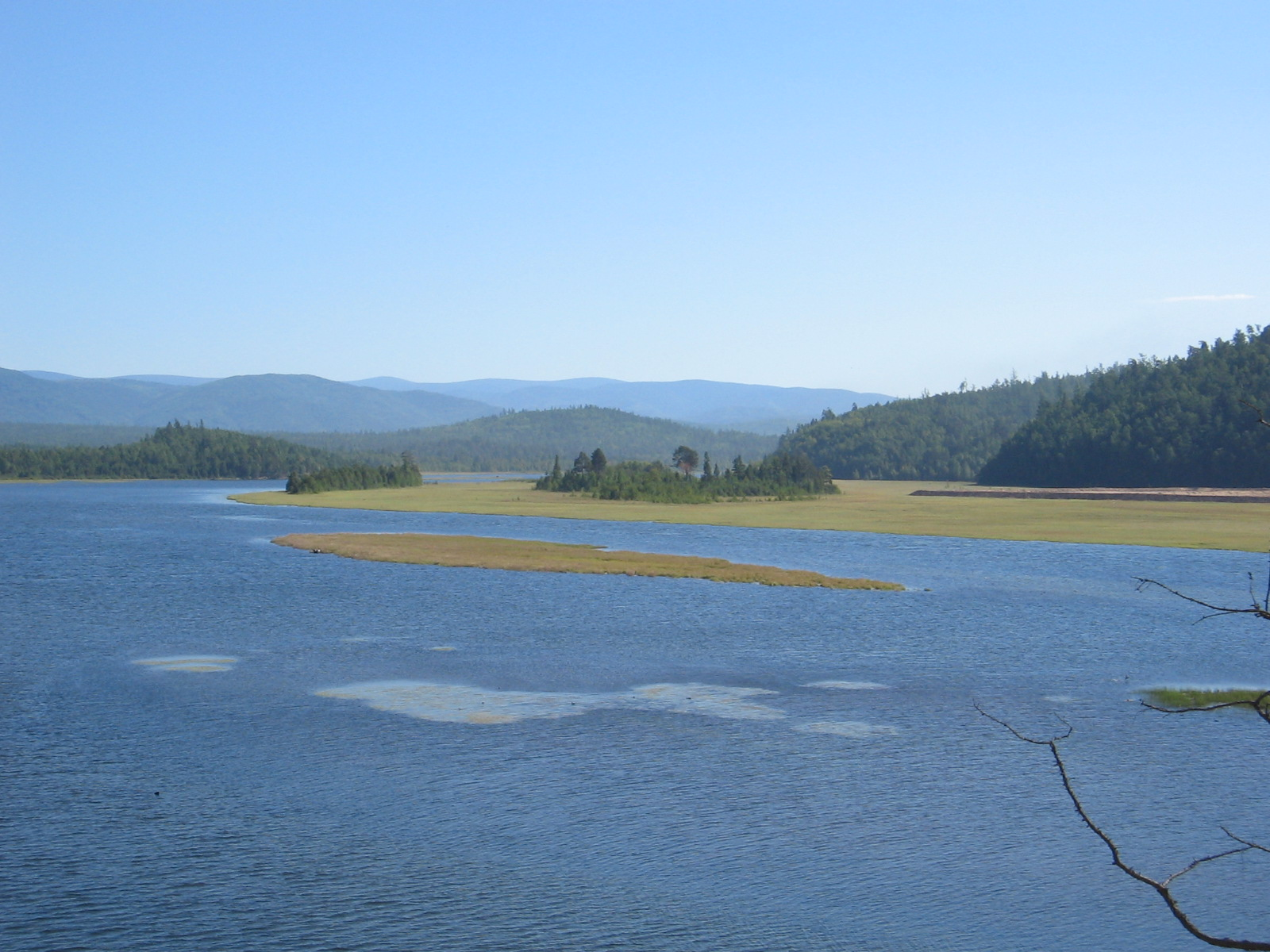
The river Turka at its mouth before joining Lake Baikal

== See also ==
- Cryptodepression
- Russian Far East
- Seven Wonders of Russia
