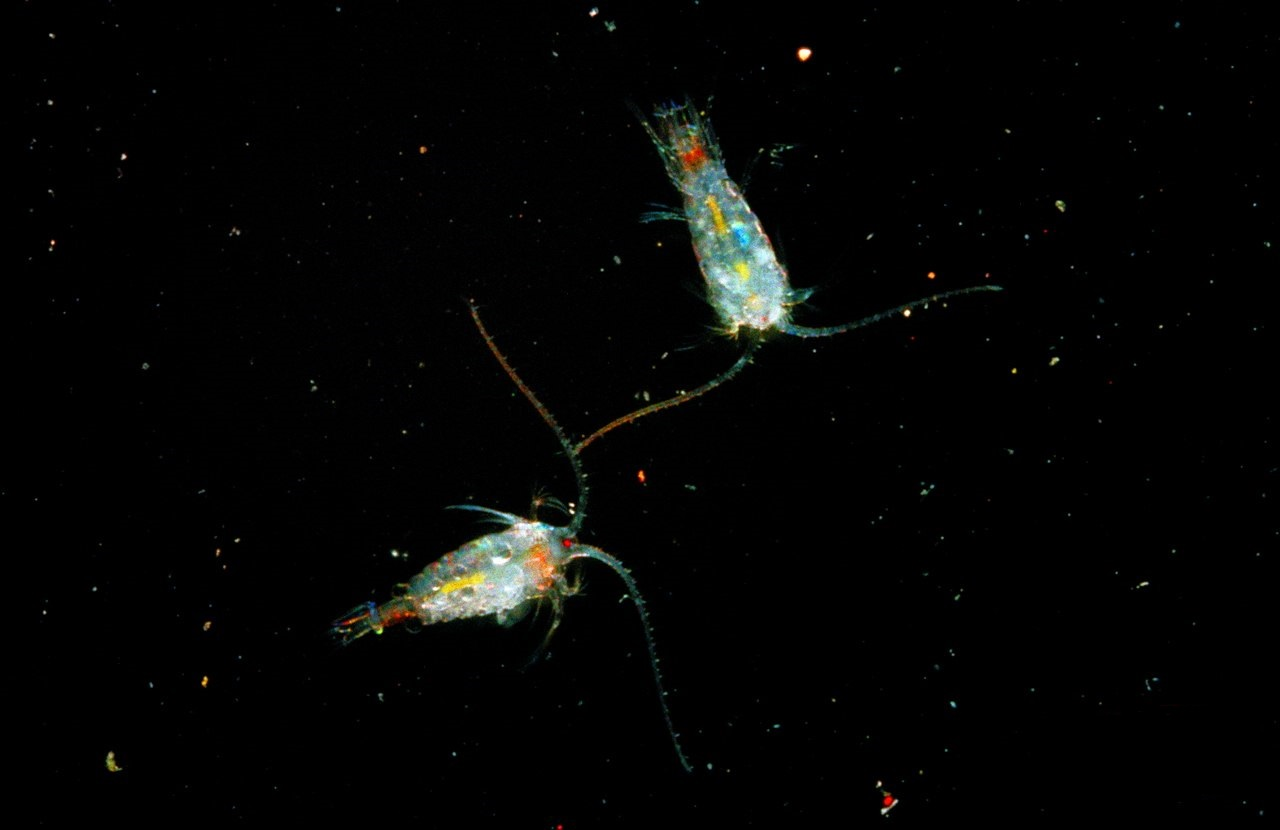

Conservation status
- Vulnerable (IUCN 2.3)

Scientific classification
- Kingdom: Animalia
- Phylum: Arthropoda
- Class: Copepoda
- Order: Calanoida
- Family: Temoridae
- Genus: Epischurella
- Species: E. baikalensis

Binomial name
- Epischurella baikalensis G. O. Sars, 1900; Smirnov 1936

Synonyms
- Epischura baikalensis (G. O. Sars, 1900); Epischura baicalensis (misnomer)

= Epischurella baikalensis =

Species of crustacean

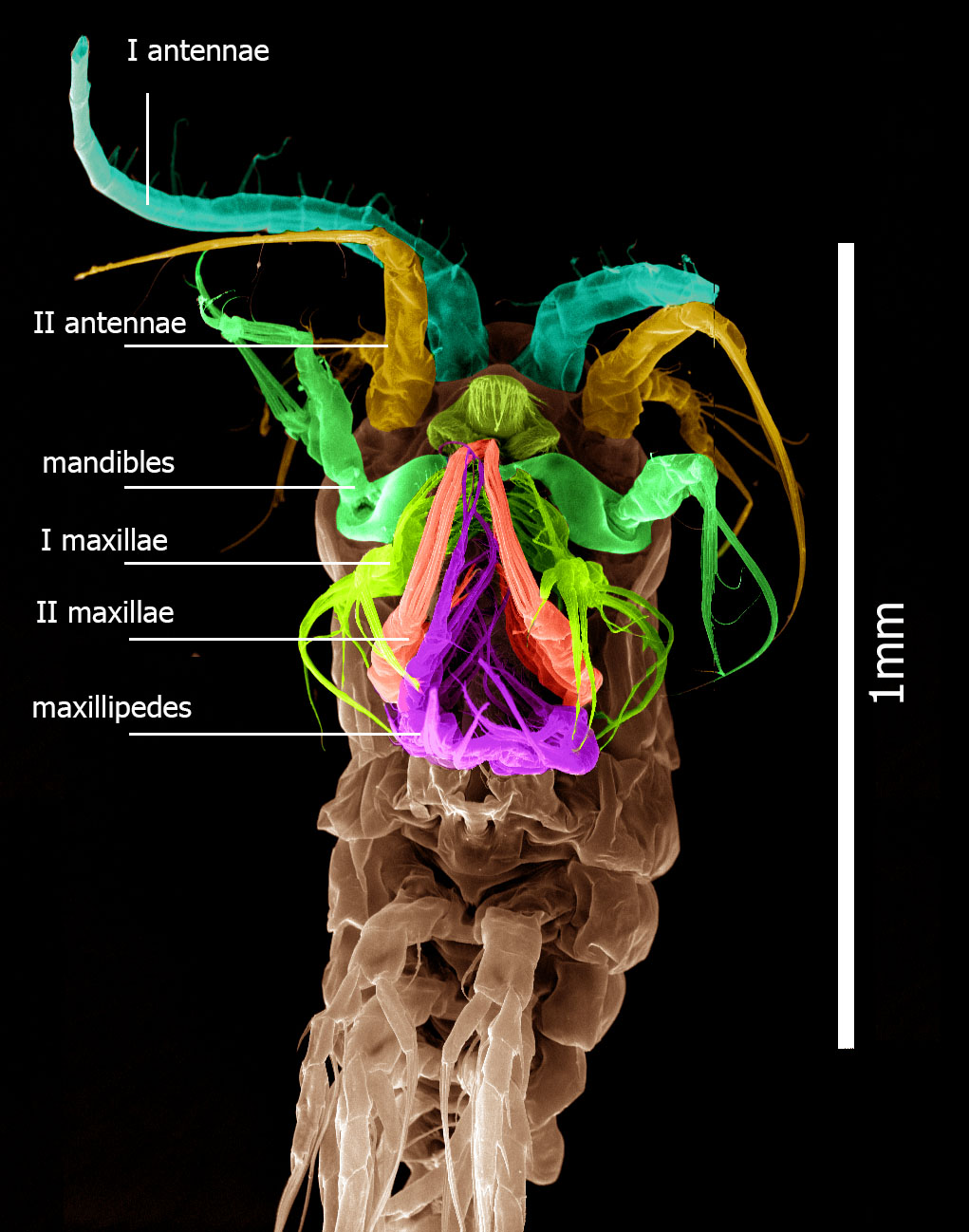
False color electron microscope photograph of Epischurella baikalensis

Epischurella baikalensis (previously Epischura baikalensis) is a species of copepod in family Temoridae. It is endemic to Lake Baikal, being the dominant zooplankton species there: 80%–90% of total biomass. It measures 1.5–2 mm (0.06–0.08 in).

Epischurella baikalensis inhabits the entire water column, and produces two generations per year: the winter–spring and the summer. These copepods develop under different ecological conditions and vary in the duration of life stages, reproduction time, maturation of sex products and adult males and females lifespan. The total life period of the animals from each generation is one year. One female can produce 10 egg sacs every 10–20 days during its lifetime. The ratio of males and females is 1:1. One of the most essential features of the ecology of E. baikalensis is the alteration of its mass inhabited areas during a year, as well as in day time. This is due to the need for various conditions for gonad maturation, reproduction, nourishing and protection from being consumed by planktivores.

It is the Epischurella baikalensis which keeps Lake Baikal clean.

== Taxonomy ==
"Epischura baicalensis" is a misnomer common in modern literature (e.g., 13 publications in WoS/Biological abstracts since 1989 vs. none for "Epischura baikalensis"). However, the original description (Sars, 1900) lists the species as Epischura baikalensis G.O.Sars, n. sp..

Recent genetic analyses of mtDNA loci resurrected Epischurella (Smirnov, 1936) as a proposed genus name, though the original Smirnov classification used Epischurella as a subgenus. The IUCN Red List has adopted this naming scheme, while other databases such as the World Register of Marine Species still use the Epischura combination.
