= Cape Ryty =

Cape in the Irkutsk Oblast of Russia

Coordinates: 53°50′01″N 108°04′31″E

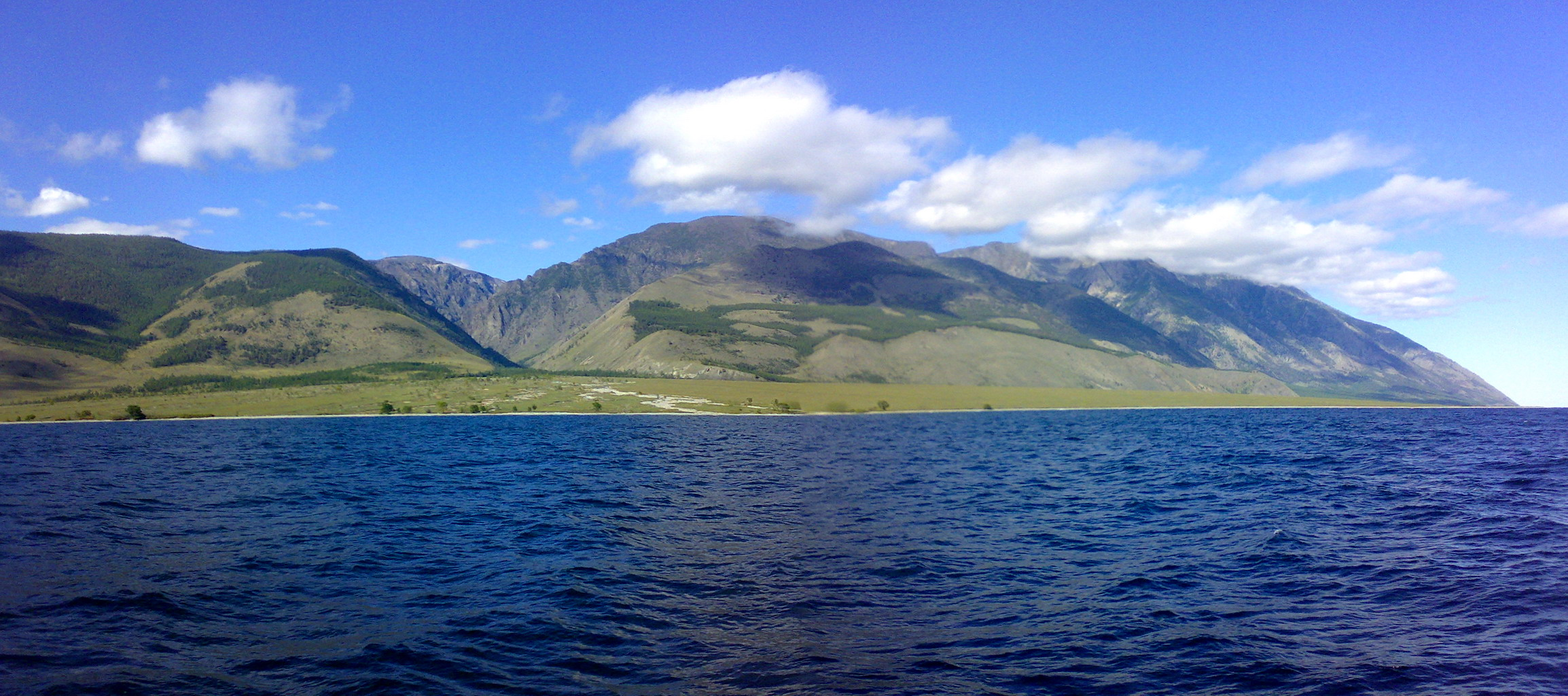
Cape Ryty

Cape Ryty (Russian: мыс Рытый) is a cape on the northwest coast of Lake Baikal, in the Irkutsk Oblast of Russia. The cape was named Ryty ("dug" in Russian) because of dried river horns, which form a dug-out image of narrow twisting ravines, pointing to Baikal. The cape is considered sacred by local indigenous population and is revered by Buryats and Evenks.

Cape Ryty was in the top five most inaccessible and mysterious destinations, compiled by the Russian Tour Operators Association.
