= Baikalian Research Centre =

Russian research organization

The Baikal Research Centre is an independent research organization focused on scientific and educational environmental studies in Lake Baikal and its area. Centre was established in 2003 as nonprofit research, technology transfer, and educational organization.

Most of center's research projects are being carried out on the basis of laboratory “Biological systems adaptation” (joint with Institute of biology at ISU). Some research projects are carrying out in partner research organizations. Center primary partners are the Irkutsk State University (Irkutsk), the Siberian Institute of Plants Physiology and Biochemistry at SB RAS (Irkutsk) and the Institute of plants physiology named after Timiryazev RAS (Moscow).

Researchers have close and successful collaboration contacts with several Russian and international research centers. From them: Humboldt University (Berlin, Germany) the Leibniz Institute of Freshwater ecology (Berlin, Germany), the Christian-Albrechts-Universität (Kiel, Germany), the Institute of Biophysics at SB RAS (Novosibirsk, Russia) and Moscow State University’s biological faculty (Moscow, Russia).

Baikal research centre is a member of the “Brandenburg Institute for Technology and Innovation Transfer” (Brandenburg, Germany). Research projects of the Baikal research centre are financed by grants of the Russian Foundation of Basic Research (RFBR), the Federal Agency on Science and Innovation (FASI), the Administration of the Irkutsk region and personal donations from private persons and organizations.
