= Megalovalvata baicalensis =

Scientific classification
- Kingdom: Animalia
- Phylum: Mollusca
- Class: Gastropoda
- Family: Valvatidae
- Genus: Megalovalvata
- Species: M. baicalensis

Binomial name
- Megalovalvata baicalensis (Gerstfeldt, 1859)

Synonyms
- Paludina baicalensis Gerstfeldt, 1859; Valvata grubii W. Dybowski, 1875

Species of gastropod

Megalovalvata baicalensis is a species of freshwater snail with an operculum, an aquatic gastropod mollusc in the family Valvatidae, the valve snails.

== Distribution ==
This species occurs in lake Baikal in depths from 3 to 50 m, and in the Angara River in Russia.

The type locality is Lake Baikal ("Baikalsee").

== Habitat ==
This snail lives in freshwater habitats.
