= Mikhail Pavlovich Ovchinnikov =

Russian revolutionary and archeologist (1884–1921)

Mikhail Ovchinnikov
- Born: Mikhail Pavlovich Ovchinnikov; 5 November 1844; Arkhangelsk, Arkhangelsk Governorate, Russian Empire
- Died: 11 June 1921 (aged 76); Irkutsk, Irkutsk Governorate, Russian SFSR
- Occupations: Revolutionary, Archeologist, and Archivist
- Employer(s): Narodnaya Volya, The Eastern Siberian Branch of the Russian Geographical Society
- Known for: Popularizing archeology in Eastern Siberia
- Spouse: Alexandra Alexandrovna née Gabysheva (married 1889)

Mikhail Pavlovich Ovchinnikov (5 November 1844 – 11 June 1921) was a Russian revolutionary, political exile, and amateur archeologist active in the Irkutsk Governorate. Ovchinnikov discovered many ancient sites around Irkutsk that were later reexamined by Irkutsk State University academia. His passion for Eastern Siberian archeology led to contemporaries dubbing him "the Father of Siberian Archeology."

== Early life ==
Ovchinnikov was born into the family of an Arkhangelsk Protopope and attended the local Theological Seminary. He studied at the Saint Petersburg Medical and Surgical Academy but eventually dropped out. Ovchinnikov enlisted in the Imperial Russian Army and served as a clerk until the spring of 1873. He then worked in a Saint Petersburg industrial factory but soon quit. Ovchinnikov began expounding the ideals of the revolutionary Narodnaya Volya in the Russian countryside. He visited villages and towns in the Kaluga, Moscow, Oryol, Tula, Tver Governorates among others to spread their political ideals.

== Olyokminsk exile ==
Ovchinnikov was a defendant in the 1877 "Trial of 50" and was banished to Kansk in the Yeniseysk Governorate. In 1881 he escaped into European Russia and lived as a fugitive. Imperial authorities recaptured him in 1885 and punished him with five years in the Russian Arctic. While he was originally sentenced to Verkhoyansk he became ill on the journey there and instead was sent to Olyokminsk. On 28 November 1886 Ovchinnikov arrived at the remote settlement. He made repeated requests for permission to participate in the few regional imperial institutions but the requests were denied by Governor-General Alexey Ignatiev.

Forced to serve his sentencing bereft of outside contact Ovchinnikov and began studying the inhabitants of Olyokminsk. Russian settlers sometimes hired Sakha to teach the Sakha language and taiga survival skills. According to Ovchinnikov the Russian Orthodox Church was the only Russian cultural influence in the remote north. During his sentencing Bishop Jacob (Domsky) visited the settlement. Some Sakha residents of Olyokminsk practiced syncretic mixture of their traditional shamanist beliefs and Orthodox Christianity. On 11 January 1889 Mikhail married Alexandra Gabysheva who was a member of the Olyok ulus.

== Irkutsk ==
In January 1891 Ovchinnikov finished his five year sentence to the Russian Arctic. He was issued an internal passport on 21 June and departed for Irkutsk with his family on 17 November. In 1892 he regained the ability to travel to European Russia with the exception of the Moscow and Saint Petersburg Governorates. In 1898 he was restored his rescinded political rights.

Ovchinnikov developed his skills as a self-taught archaeologist, and became an active part of the Eastern Siberian Branch of the Imperial Russian Geographical Society (ESBIRGS). Headquartered in Irkutsk the organization included academics like Nikolai N. Agapitov, Jan Czerski, Dmitry Klements, Vladimir Obruchev, Grigory Potanin, and Nikolai Ivanovich Vitkovsky (Николай Иванович Витковский). In 1900 Ovchinnikov was elected a full time member and eight years later became the conservator of the museum maintained in Irkutsk. Due to interpersonal conflicts he resigned two years later, an experience that Ovchinnikov considered particularly painful.

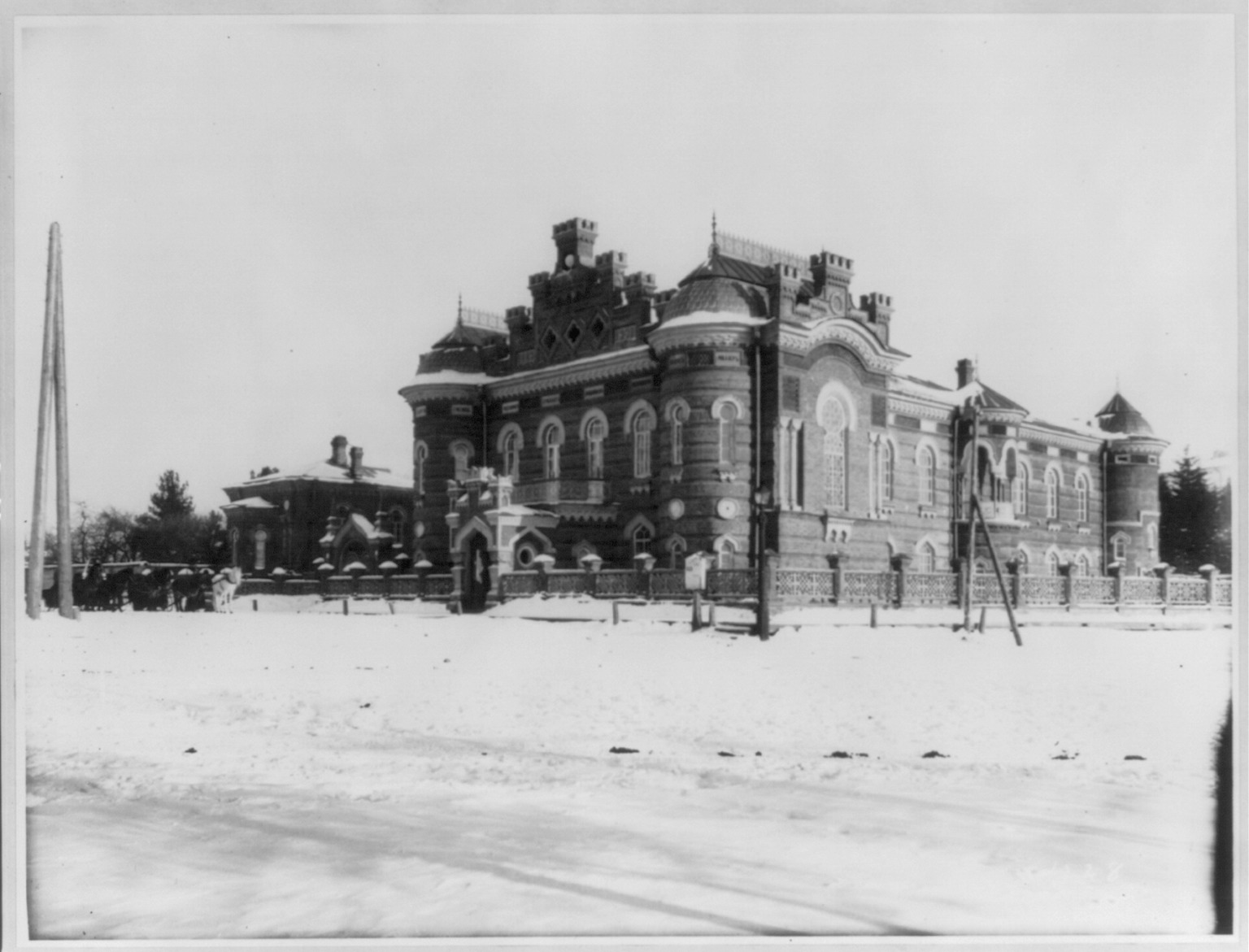
Irkutsk City Museum maintained by the Eastern Siberian Department of the Russian Geographical Society

The Irkutsk Scientific Archive Commission was formed in 1911. Ovchinnikov initially served as a deputy before becoming the chairman. In 1912 the first of several annual exhibits documenting the ancient history of Baikalia were held. Ovchinnikov served as the chairman for the exhibit held in 1912. The first volume of the organization's proceedings were published in 1913 with Ovchinnikov acting as an assistant to the editor.

In 1917 Ovchinnikov became the head of the Irkutsk Provincial Archive upon its formation. During that year the Russian Civil War erupted which him to suffer financial difficulties and malnutrition. Regardless of the privations he continued work for the Provincial Archive. Ovchinnikov was admitted to the Irkutsk State University hospital and died there on 11 June 1921. Among the items bequeathed by Ovchinnikov to the Irkutsk Scientific Archive were numerous notes and drafts about Eastern Siberian archeology and ethnography, along with correspondence with various scientific figures and journalists.

== Archeology ==
=== Sakha progenitors ===
Ovchinnikov interviewed local Sakha people about their social customs and religious beliefs while exiled at Olyokminsk. In 1897 he published a collection of their traditional folklore. One account claims that the Sakha once inhabited Baikalia but certain enemies forced them north to the Lena River. During the 1890s Ovchinnikov conducted interviews with local Irkutsk Buryats. They told stories of their ancestors displacing a group of blacksmiths from Lake Baikal. These accounts identified the Uryankhay (Russian: Урянхайский), a term usually applied to the Tuvans, with the Sakha. D. A. Kochnev later agreed with this connection based on his own interpretation of linguistic data.

Ovchinnikov hypothesized that the ancestral Sakha were hypothesized to originate from the Baraba steppe. They gradually migrated east to the Yenisey and later Baikalia. During the time of Chinggis Khan the ancient Sakha were forced to the Lena by the expanding Mongol Empire. He found evidence of iron and copper smithing along with caches of iron ore deposited in pits in the region. Near Bratsk and Kirensk he collected arrowheads that in his opinion resembled Sakha made ones. Outside Irkutsk he found a buried piece of shale with an image of a woman carved onto it. Ovchinnikov considered the finding proof that Turkic peoples resided on the Angara.

At the Irkutsk Museum in 1912 Ovchinnikov met Bernhard Petri and developed a close relationship with him. Petri reported that the ethnogenesis of the Sakha was "jokingly dubbed" the "Yakut problem" in their discussions. The Kurumchi culture was influenced by the earlier work of Ovchinnikov. For example the ancient Sakha as conceived by Ovchinnikov inhabited the same territories as the Kurumchi as proposed by Petri. It has also been demonstrated that Ovchinnikov's opinions served as the basis to Petri's 1922 article "Ancient Buryatia."

=== Glazkovsky Necropolis ===
During building construction outside Irkutsk in Glazkov (within the contemporary Sverdlovsk district) a series of ancient burials were uncovered. The old graves weren't preserved and became damaged by laborers. In 1887 Nikolai Vitkovsky documented the destroyed graves. In 1892 Ovchinnikov discovered more ancient burials in the Maiden Tsar park (now the Paris Commune Park) in what has become known as the Glazkovsky Necropolis. He made further surveys of the park in 1897. Throughout these digs a number of old copper knives were found, with several adorned with bone handles. Ovchinnikov believed the blades to have been produced locally in Baikalia. In 1906 Ovchinnikov proposed the Paleolithic era Kitoi and the Neolithic era Irkutsk archeological cultures. Vitkovsky renamed the Neolithic society to the Glazkov culture which became the accepted appellation by scholars. The Irkutsk section of the Trans-Siberian Railway began in 1897. The creation of infrastructure including depots, stations, secondary roads destroyed several hundred ancient burials of the Glazkovsky Necropolis.

== Legacy ==
Contemporaries of Ovchinnikov called him "the Father of Siberian Archeology" due his many years of raising interest in the ancient history of Eastern Siberia. Although generally unwilling to publish his conclusions, his conviction that bronze capable societies once existed in the region was seen as an especially important intellectual development. Ovchinnikov located many archeological sites around Irkutsk that were later reexamined in a methodical manner by Irkutsk State University staff and students. During the 1920s the vast majority of the Irkutsk Museum ancient collections were still items discovered by Ovchinnikov.

Bernhard Petri recalled the personal study of Ovchinnikov being quite cramped:

"[there were] dusty mountains, from which here and there corners of books, manuscripts, old newspapers, icons, ancient weapons, pictures with things sewn on them, and various bundles and shapeless objects stuck out. In this chaos, M.P. found and navigated everything much faster than we did with the help of our card catalogs. It was the same in the museum: in the corners, in drawers, behind cabinets everywhere there were “blockages” of things, everywhere there were boxes, bundles were stuffed, individual objects lay… Not only were the collections not systematized, but they were not even arranged into three periods - Stone, Bronze, and Iron."

In 2003 Bair Dashibalov re-examined the published works of Ovchinnikov and found that he "was carried away by the proof of the Yakut presence in the Baikal region." M. Chirikova in 2012 noted that Ovchinnikov "devoted his life to the development of historical science" in Eastern Siberia. In 2016 Vladimir Ushnitsky concluded that Ovchinnikov expanded the archeological knowledge of Eastern Siberia but found his work on Sakha folklore particularly valuable for ethnographer researchers.

== Bibliography ==
=== Published works ===
- Ovchinnikov, Mikhail P. (1897). "Из материалов по этнографии якутов" [From materials on the ethnography of the Yakuts]. Etnograficheskoye Obozreniye (in Russian). 34 (3). Irkutsk.
- Ovchinnikov, Mikhail P. (1904). "Материалы для изучения памятников в окрестностях г. Иркутска" [Materials for the study of monuments in the vicinity of Irkutsk]. Izvestiya Vostochno-Sibirskogo Otdela Imperatorskogo Russkogo Geograficheskogo Obshchestva (in Russian). 30 (3).
- Ovchinnikov, Mikhail P. (1904). "Сордохай-богатырь. Якутская сказка" [Sordokhai the hero. Yakut fairy tale]. Izvestiya Vostochno-Sibirskogo Otdela Imperatorskogo Russkogo Geograficheskogo Obshchestva (in Russian). 35 (2): 1–8.
- Ovchinnikov, Mikhail P. (1910). "Материалы для изучения народного знахарства и отреченной литературы в Иркутской губернии" [Materials for the study of folk medicine and renounced literature in the Irkutsk province]. Izvestiya Vostochno-Sibirskogo Otdela Imperatorskogo Russkogo Geograficheskogo Obshchestva (in Russian). 39: 24–35.
- Ovchinnikov, Mikhail (1912). "НА МОЕЙ ПАМЯТИ" [In my memory]. Siberian Archive (in Russian) (11): 855–878.
- Ovchinnikov, Mikhail P. (1916). "Отчет о командировке в г. Киренск для осмотра архивов от Иркутска до Киренска" [Report on a business trip to Kirensk to inspect the archives from Irkutsk to Kirensk]. Trudy Irkutskoy Arkhivnoy Komissii (in Russian).

=== Books ===
- Dashibalov, Bair B. (2003). "НА БАЙКАЛЬСКИХ БЕРЕГАХ: «Якутская проблема» в археологии Прибайкалья" [ON THE BAYKAL SHORES: The "Yakut Problem" in the Archaeology of the Baikal Region]. Истоки: от древних хори-монголов к бурятам. Очерки [Origins: from the ancient Hori-Mongols to the Buryats. Essays] (in Russian). Buryat Scientific Center of the Siberian Branch of the Russian Academy of Sciences. ISBN 5-7925-0127-0.
- Kazaryan, P. L. (1996). Олекминская политическая ссылка 1826-1917 [Olekminsky political exile 1826-1917] (in Russian). Yakutsk. Archived from the original on 2021-10-25.
- Okladnikov, Alexey (1950). Неолит и бронзовый век Прибайкалья [Neolithic and Bronze Age of the Baikal region]. Materials and research on the archeology of the USSR (in Russian). Leningrad, Moscow: Academy of Sciences of the Soviet Union.

=== Articles ===
- Bazaliysky, V. I.; Tetenkin, A. V.; Kharinsky, A. V. (2016). "Иркутск археологический" [Irkutsk Archeological]. History (in Russian). 16. Irkutsk State University: 8–27.
- Berdnikov, I. M. (2018). "Неолит Прибайкалья: история одной дискуссии" [The Baikal region: the history of one discussion]. Geoarchaeology Ethnology Anthropology (in Russian). 26. Irkutsk: Irkutsk State University: 3–45. doi:10.26516/2227-2380.2018.26.3.
- Chirikova, M. V. (2012). "ИРКУТСКАЯ ГУБЕРНСКАЯ УЧЕНАЯ АРХИВНАЯ КОМИССИЯ: ИСТОРИОГРАФИЧЕСКИЙ И ИСТОЧНИКОВЕДЧЕСКИЙ ОБЗОР" [IRKUTSK PROVINCIAL ACADEMIC ARCHIVAL COMMISSION: HISTORIOGRAPHICAL AND SOURCE STUDY REVIEW]. Vestnik Irkutskogo Gosudarstvennogo Tekhnicheskogo Universiteta (in Russian). Irkutsk: Irkutsk State University: 326–331.
- Khoroshikh, Pavel P. (1924). "Михаил Павлович Овчинников, как краевед" [Mikhail Pavlovich Ovchinnikov as a local historian]. Sibirskaya Zhivaya Starina (in Russian). 2: 135–146. Archived from the original on 2021-10-25.
- Kochnev, D. A. (1899). "Очерки юридического быта якутов" [Essays on the legal life of the Yakuts]. Proceedings of the Society of Archeology, History, Ethnography at the Imperial Kazan University. 15 (2). Imperial Kazan University.
- Petri, Bernhard E. (1922). "М. П. Овчинни ков, как археолог" [M. P. Ovchinnikov as an archeologist]. Sibirskiye Ogni (in Russian). 4. Archived from the original on 2021-10-25.
- Ushnitskiy, Vasiliy V. (2016). "Researchers of Tsarist Russia on the study of the origin of the Sakha people". Vestnik Tomskogo Gosudarstvennogo Universiteta (in Russian) (407). Yakutsk: Institute of the Humanities and the Indigenous Peoples: 150–155. doi:10.17223/15617793/407/23. Archived from the original on 2022-01-21.
