= Buhusan burial complex =

Multi-period burial ground in Buryatia

- Могильник Бухусан (Russian)
- Interactive map of Buhusan burial complex
- 52.91083°N 111.98139°E
- Periods: Neolithic, Bronze Age, Iron Age
- Location: Russia, Republic of Buryatia, Yeravninsky District

Site notes
- Discovered: 27 burials

Buhusan is a multi-period burial complex located in the Yeravninsky District of the Republic of Buryatia on the hill of the same name along the southern shore of Lake Isinga. It was discovered in 1970 by an archaeological expedition of the M. N. Khangalov Buryat Republican Museum of Local History under the direction of archaeologist L. G. Ivashina. Excavations were carried out between 1970 and 1973.

A total of 27 graves were examined: 16 were attributed to the Neolithic period, one to the Bronze Age, and ten to the Early Iron Age. All burials contained grave goods. The maximum burial depth ranged from 0.4 to 0.6 m. Most skeletons were found in a crouched position on the right side with legs bent at the knees and the head oriented toward the northeast. All burials were single except one, which contained three skeletons. Anthropological research established that all individuals exhibited Mongoloid cranial features.

The site is designated as a federal-level cultural heritage monument of the Russian Federation.

== Geographical Location ==
The burial ground is located on the northwestern outskirts of the village of Isinga in the Yeravninsky District of the Republic of Buryatia, on the slopes of Buhusan Hill near the southern shore of Lake Isinga, on a 10–12 m terrace within the central basin of the Yeravna lake system.

On the neighboring Altyn Hill, L. G. Ivashina discovered another burial ground in 1971 consisting of 11 graves, most of which had been destroyed.

The placement of burials on elevated ground is typical of the Neolithic period. Mountains were regarded as sacred in funerary rites and perceived as a link between the world of the living and the world of the dead. A mountain was seen as the beginning of the journey to the afterlife because of its proximity to the sky.

Proximity to water also carried symbolic meaning. In funerary beliefs, water was associated with posthumous rebirth. Among Siberian peoples, water symbolized the Lower World. River, mountain, tree, and wind were considered pathways connecting different worlds. In many cultures, the dead were believed to continue xistence in another realm, and cemeteries were therefore perceived as settlements of the deceased.

According to Ivashina, the earliest Neolithic graves on Buhusan Hill were constructed on its southwestern side and gradually extended northeastward along the edge of the hill (burials Nos. 1, 3–7, 10–13, 18, 20–22). From the southeast, a Bronze Age grave (No. 8) adjoined the Neolithic burials, and nearby were Iron Age graves (Nos. 2, 9, 14–19, 23, 24). Iron Age burial No. 18 disturbed the stone setting of Neolithic burial No. 18, resulting in burials from different periods being located at the same level.

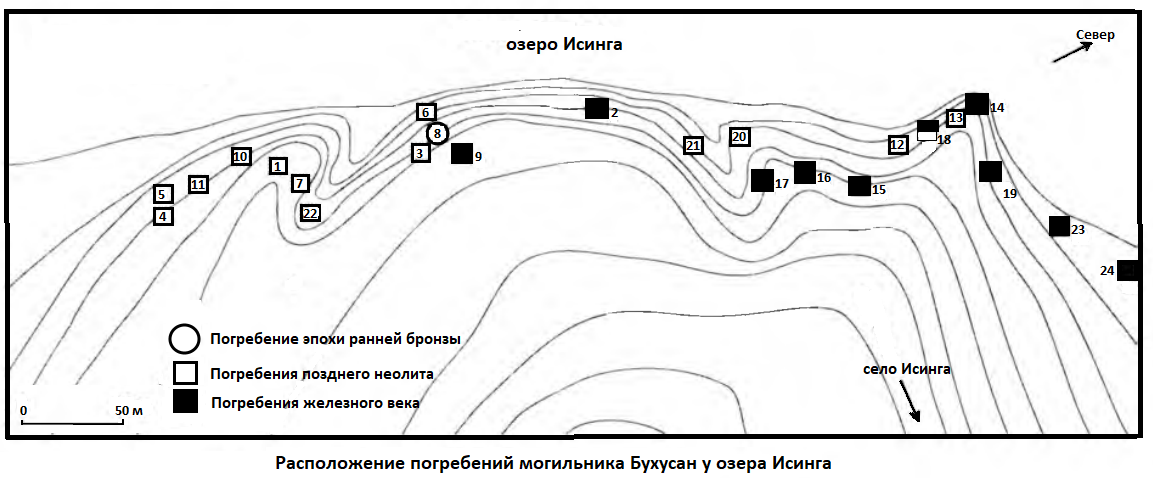
Buhusan Burial Ground: Circle — Early Bronze Age burials; white square — Late Neolithic burials; black square — Iron Age burials. At the top — Lake Isinga; at the bottom — the village of Isinga.

== Research History ==
The burial ground was discovered in 1970 by an archaeological expedition of the M. N. Khangalov Buryat Republican Museum of Local History under the direction of L. G. Ivashina.

That same year, the expedition laid an exploratory trench measuring 8 × 3 m on the hill, where the first skeleton was uncovered. A total of six burials were excavated in 1970. Further excavations were conducted between 1971 and 1973.

In 1971, a bronze knife was recovered from one of the burials; it has parallels at the Ust-Mil site. A fragment of a similar knife was found in another burial at the Buhusan cemetery.

In 2008, the site was surveyed by an archaeological expedition of the research and production association "Baikal-Expedition" under the direction of P. E. Marnuev.

The archaeological site is protected by the state in accordance with Resolution No. 379 of the Council of Ministers of the Buryat ASSR dated 29 September 1971.

By Order No. 37289-r of the Ministry of Culture of the Russian Federation dated 5 August 2016, the burial ground was entered into the Unified State Register of Cultural Heritage Sites (Monuments of History and Culture) of the Peoples of the Russian Federation as a federal-level cultural heritage site under the designation "Neolithic Burial Ground," and was assigned registration number 031640440920006.

== Burial Ground ==
Buhusan Hill served as a burial place for several centuries. Some of the graves discovered there had been damaged by natural landslides on the hill: stones from the masonry were scattered, and partially preserved skeletons were found beneath them. In some cases, earlier stone structures were deliberately dismantled for the construction of later graves.

The Neolithic burials were marked by single-row stone settings made of granite blocks, which were difficult to trace on the surface. After cleaning, it was established that these stone structures were circular or oval in shape, with an average diameter of about 2 m. In some instances, after cleaning, stones appeared scattered without any clear order (for example, in burials Nos. 13 and 18).

Iron Age graves were similar in the form of their stone settings to the Neolithic ones.

The outlines of the burial pits could not be identified. Because the burials were shallow—no more than 0.4–0.6 m deep —bones and parts of grave goods exposed during the dismantling of the stone settings may not have been preserved.

Due to their limited depth, the burials were subjected to pressure from the underlying bedrock, which may have destroyed the contours of the burial pits and, in some graves, disrupted the anatomical arrangement of the bones. All burials were single, except for burial No. 13, where the skeletons of three individuals were found.

Most of the deceased were buried in a crouched position on the right side, with their legs bent at the knees and their heads oriented toward the northeast. Some graves showed traces of ochre. All burials contained grave goods.

In total, 27 graves were investigated: 16 Neolithic, one Bronze Age, and ten Early Iron Age burials.

Anthropologist I. I. Gokhman conducted anthropological analyses of burials Nos. 3 and 6. The results showed that burial No. 3 contained a woman aged 30–35 years, and burial No. 6 a man approximately 30 years old. The deceased exhibited Mongoloid cranial features.

Radiocarbon dates were obtained for several burials, ranging from 6650±90 to 4525±50 BP. According to L. G. Ivashina, these dates allow the burials to be attributed to the Kitoy–Serovo period.

Based on the grave goods and burial rite, L. G. Ivashina attributed the Neolithic burials of the Buhusan burial ground to the late stage of the Transbaikal Neolithic, dating them to the end of the third — beginning of the second millennium BCE. She also identified a "Buhusan stage" in the development of the Late Neolithic cultures of the forest-steppe Transbaikalia.

This dating of the burial ground was questioned by Yu. S. Grishin, who argued that there were no reliable grounds for assigning the site to the Late Neolithic stage. He based his opinion on the fact that radiocarbon dates obtained from the burial ground showed a rather wide range, extending from the Early Neolithic to the Early Middle Ages.

The earliest burials at the site are burials Nos. 20 and 21, which were attributed to the Middle Neolithic period. These graves contained only isolated skeletal remains and grave goods, including stone and bone arrowheads, microblade, micro-scrapers, flakes, blades, and fragments of pottery.

Slightly later were burials Nos. 3 and 4, which shared similar features of the funerary rite; they were attributed to the end of the Neolithic — the Eneolithic period.

Burial No. 8 was attributed to the Bronze Age on the basis of a bronze plate knife found within it, sickle-shaped and featuring shallow grooves along the blade. L. G. Ivashina argued that the knife had parallels in the second group of the Fofanovo burial ground and dated the burial to no later than the second millennium BCE. Yu. S. Grishin, however, maintained that the knife was "clearly of Ust-Mil type." In his view, the grooves on the blade are characteristic of Karasuk-type knives, a conclusion supported by a radiocarbon date of 2940±100 BP, corresponding to the beginning of the first millennium BCE. In burial No. 8, the deceased lay on the back with the head oriented toward the southeast. The skull was absent.

Comparing the Neolithic burials of the Buhusan burial ground with other cemeteries of the Kitoy culture in the Cis-Baikal region, as well as with the early burials of the Fofanovo burial ground, L. G. Ivashina noted that the Buhusan interments exhibit a combination of features characteristic of both the Kitoy and the Glazkov cultures (according to the periodization of A. P. Okladnikov).

In addition, the grave goods from the Neolithic burials show similarities to the assemblages of the Belkachi and Ymyyakhtakh cultural complexes of Yakutia. The bronze artifacts from the burial ground have parallels in the material culture of the Ust-Mil culture.

A distinctive feature of the Buhusan burial ground, which sets it apart from Neolithic and Early Bronze Age sites of the Cis-Baikal region, is the complete absence of jade artifacts. One feature that allows some of the burials to be attributed to the Kitoy culture is the presence of ochre in the graves—one of the principal elements of the Kitoy funerary rite in the Cis-Baikal region and in the archaeological cultures of Yakutia.

The Buhusan burial ground shares many similarities with Kitoy burials in terms of grave goods, including inset bone knives, dagger-like horn points, horn harpoons, bifacially retouched inserts, triangular arrowheads with concave bases, and pear-shaped pendants made from red deer tusks. At the same time, the Buhusan burials exhibit significant differences from Kitoy burials: the use of stone masonry in grave construction, the shallow depth of burials (up to 0.4–0.6 m), and the crouched position of the skeletons on their sides. In contrast, Kitoy burials were ground interments with burial pits reaching depths of 1.5–2 m, where the deceased were predominantly laid on their backs.

Burial No. 11 contained shanks of bone fishing hooks of the Glazkov type among its grave goods.
