= Bernhard Eduardovich Petri =

Russian anthropologist (1884-1937)

Bernhard Petri
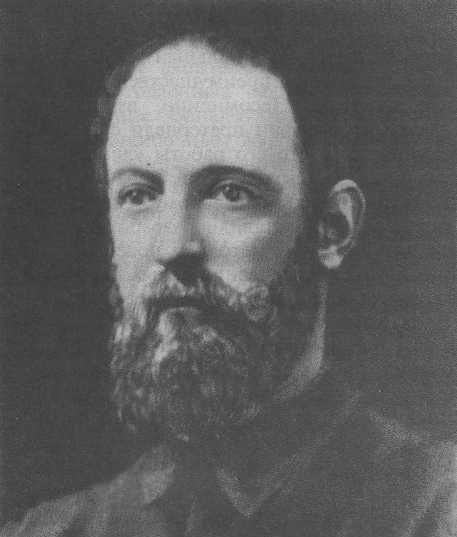
- Born: Bernhard Eduardovich Petri; 17 September 1884; Bern, Switzerland
- Died: 25 November 1937 (aged 53); Irkutsk Oblast, Russian SFSR, Soviet Union
- Education: Saint Petersburg Imperial University
- Known for: Proposing the Kurumchi culture as the first Iron Age archaeological culture of Baikalia. Ethnographic research about indigenous peoples from the East Siberian taiga.
- Spouse: Lyubov Illaionovna née Kokhanovich (died 1937)
- Children: Oleg (1916-1984)
- Scientific career
- Fields: Anthropology, Archaeology, Ethnology
- Workplaces: Kunstkamera, Irkutsk State University, Institute of the Peoples of the North
- Doctoral advisor: Vasily Radlov
- Notable students: Georgy Debets, Mikhail M. Gerasimov, Gavriil Ksenofontov, Alexey Okladnikov, and Georgy P. Sosnovsky

Bernhard Eduardovich Petri (Russian: Бернгард Эдуардович Петри; 17 September 1884 – 25 November 1937) was a Russian anthropologist and archaeologist. Petri organized archeology and ethnographic expeditions to Lake Baikal, while employed by the Kunstkamera during the 1910s.

Iron artefacts were discovered and used to propose the Kurumchi culture as the first Iron Age society of Baikalia. Petri became a professor at the Irkutsk State University and taught about the ancient history of the Indigenous peoples of Siberia. He documented the cultures of several reindeer herding societies across the East Siberian taiga for the Institute of the Peoples of the North throughout the 1920s and 1930s.

In 1937 Petri was executed by the NKVD during the Great Purge.

== Early life ==
The Swedish Lutheran figure Olaus Petri was a paternal ancestor whose descendants later relocated to Livonia in contemporary Cēsis, Latvia. Imperial Russian authorities had sentenced Bernhard's father, Edward Petri, to internal exile for vague association with the revolutionary Land and Liberty. However, Edward escaped to Switzerland. Bernhard was born in 1884 in Bern while his father was an assistant professor of Geography and Anthropology at the city university. In 1887 Edward returned to St. Petersburg, received a pardon, and became a professor at the Saint Petersburg Imperial University.

Bernhard's childhood was spent in the Kingdom of Italy. At twelve he was enrolled at the Karl May School of Saint Petersburg in 1899. In the same year, Edward died and left his family in a perilous financial position. Evgenia joined the Kunstkamera to secure an income to support her two sons. She eventually became the head of the Australia and Oceania Department. Vasily Radlov was a colleague of Edward who, after his death, acted as the guardian of Bernhard.

Petri attended the St. Petersburg University, where Radlov and Lev Sternberg became his primary academic influence. He developed a keen interest in anthropology, archeology, and ethnography as he felt the disciplines could combine to reconstruct the ancient material and spiritual cultures of contemporary societies. In 1910, he graduated from the university.

== Academic career ==
=== Initial work ===
In 1910, Petri joined the Kunstkamera alongside his mother and Radlov as a junior ethnographer. His area of interest became the Buryats of Baikalia. In 1912, the Russian Committee for the Study of Central and East Asia directed Petri to head an expedition to Lake Baikal to document the Buryat material, religious, and social culture. He interviewed members of the Alar, Balagan, Kudin, and Verkholensk Buryat groups; developing an interest in the initiation rites for their shamans in the process.

During the first expedition, Petri searched around the Murin River valley in modern Ekhirit-Bulagatsky district and the modern Olkhonsky district for ancient artefacts. The Neolithic site Ulan-Khada (Russian: Улан-Хада) was discovered near contemporary Kurkut but wasn't excavated that year. In 1913 Petri returned to Baikalia and began formally excavating Ulan-Khada. Reportedly, there were twelve distinct cultural layers at the site. Petri's findings there remain the basis for the chronology of ancient Baikalia. In 1916 Petri explored the cave systems of Olkhon Island.

=== Irkutsk State University ===
In the spring of 1918, Petri and his wife Lyubov relocated from Petrograd to Irkutsk. Oleg, their son, already resided there with his maternal grandparents. The city also served as the initial starting place of Petri's prior expeditions. Irkutsk attracted other academics from Kazan, Omsk, Perm, and Tomsk escaping the Siberian frontlines of the Russian Civil War. Despite the ongoing conflict the White government Minister of Education Vasily V. Sapozhnikov opened the Irkutsk State University in November 1918.

Initially, Petri served as a lecturer and soon became the professor in charge of the Department of Primitive History. He taught students about the ancient history of various Indigenous peoples of Siberia. In 1919, Petri established a university ethnographic paper dedicated to presenting independent student fieldwork. Many future academics presented their findings in the paper, including Georgy Debets, Mikhail M. Gerasimov, Pavel P. Khoroshikh (Russian: Павел П. Хороших), Gavriil Ksenofontov, Alexey Okladnikov, Vasily I. Podgorbunsky (Russian: Василий И. Подгорбунский), and Georgy P. Sosnovsky

At the Irkutsk city museum, Petri became acquainted with the elderly Mikhail Pavlovich Ovchinnikov. They shared their archaeological findings and conclusions about the ancient history of Eastern Siberia. Petri reported that a frequent topic discussed was the origins of the Sakha people. These conversations were "jokingly dubbed" the "Yakut problem" as the two scholars speculated on the Sakha ethnogenesis. The Red Army captured Irkutsk in March 1920. Two years later, the city museum was reopened with Petri serving as the head of the ethnology department.

In the 1920s, Petri published his interpretation of the artefacts he found in Baikalia during the previous decade. He concluded that a hitherto unknown society produced the archaeological remains. Iron items were discovered in their settlements, which led to Petri calling them the "Kurumchi blacksmiths". In autumn 1923 Petri led an expedition to Lake Khövsgöl. They used a steamboat to reconnoiter locations worth investigating. Locally produced watercraft made from Larix sibirica was then used to reach the sites to perform archaeological surveys. In dunes, Petri discovered ceramic remains which he considered from the Kurumchi culture.

In 1926, the Department of History and Philology at Irkutsk State University was abolished. After the closure, Petri worked for a short time in 1928 at the Research Biological and Geographical Institute of the University.

=== Ethnography and activism ===
Established in 1924, the Institute of the Peoples of the North funded several ethnographic expeditions overseen by Petri to certain Indigenous peoples of Siberia. The Sayan Mountains had several related cultures that traditionally practiced reindeer herding; the Dukha in the Mongolian People's Republic, the Tozhu Tuvans of the Tuvan People's Republic, and the Soyots and the Tofalar of the Soviet Union, located in the Buryat ASSR and the Irkutsk Oblast respectively. Two expeditions, occurring in 1925 and 1926, were focused on documenting these societies and were the longest Petri oversaw. The first was with the Tofalar. Petri noted that their hunting grounds were divided by patrilineal affiliation. The second expedition lasted six months and was among the Soyots. Petri encountered three groups that still practised reindeer herding and counted 124 in total. Only one herd had reindeer as the principal animal, responsible for half those reported. The other two herds accounted for only a quarter of the total reindeer; combined they had 203 yaks and Mongolian cattle, along with 73 goats and sheep.

In February 1929 Petri contacted the Irkutsk Committee of the North on behalf of the Soyot people. They couldn't afford to send a representative to the Buryat ASSR capital of Ulan-Ude. In the petition, Petri focused on several issues facing the Soyots. There was a heavy tax on milk produced by their cattle. A supposed loan of 5,000 Soviet rubles from the Buryat ASSR never materialized and no schools had been opened for them. The Soyots traditionally sourced their reindeer from the Todzhinsky District of Tuva. However, at the time, the Buryat authorities prevented Soyots from crossing the border. Petri recommended that a new Soyot administrative unit be established to remediate these issues. The Buryat ASSR government was able to prevent Petri from acting on behalf of the Soyots in the future by denouncing his petition:

"Professor Petri's work opened up the Soyot kulak community and energized it, especially on the question of self-determination. Petri relied on the kulak elite and objectively supported the Soyot's wrong sentiment to secede from the Bourrepublic, to trade freely with Uryankhai and Mongolia, to sell their furs wherever they liked, to get rid of the Communists - these were essentially kulak demands…"

Petri continued to study other Siberian Indigenous. During 1928 and 1929 he documented the material culture of the Upper Lena based Tuturo-Ocheul Evenks. While he argued against their relocation to the Lower Angara, Soviet authorities ignored his criticisms and underwent the forced movement.

In 1930, an expedition was organized to reach the Evenks that inhabited the Kalakan, Kalar, and Karenga tributaries of the Vitim River. The documentation was lost for decades, but an article authored by Petri about the expedition was recovered and published in 2012. It was located in an archive containing the inventory of Northern Asia (Russian: Северная Азия), a scholarly journal in the early USSR. Reportedly sedentary Evenks lived in log cabins. They bred chickens and domesticated geese but had small numbers of cows and horses. Vegetable gardens of carrots, potatoes, and turnips were maintained. The local fur trade started at the end of October and ended in February.

Petri led archaeological surveys of the Angara in 1934. Two years later he oversaw exploratory excavations on the Kuda

== Great Purge ==
Petri became a victim of the Great Purge in 1937. In May, he was charged with conspiring with a "German-Japanese fascist... right-wing Trotskyite organization in eastern Siberia" into provoking a revolt in the Buryat ASSR against the Soviet Union. On 1 November Petri was arrested. Under coercion, he named former academic mentor Vasily Radlov, who died in 1918, as his spy handler. According to Mikhail Konstantinov, during the interrogations "Petri tried his best to ward off the threat from his colleagues and students." Petri was subsequently executed at 11:25 PM on 25 November 1937. His support for Siberian Indigenous people likely contributed to his execution.

== Legacy ==
Petri taught students who went on to pursue careers in anthropology, archaeology, economics, and geography. They collectively studied such topics as settlement patterns of various Siberian ethnicities, the reconstruction of ancient social systems, and the ethnogenesis of certain societies.

The Transbaikal Military District began a review of Petri's case in October 1958. It was found that he was innocent and improperly sentenced. On 19 June 1959 Petri was formally rehabilitated.

== Bibliography ==
=== Published works ===
- Petri, Bernhard E.; Mikhailov, Vasily A. (1913). "Отчет о командировке Б. Э. Петри и В. А. Михайлова" [Report on the trip of B. E. Petri and V. A. Mikhailov] (PDF). Известия Русского Комитета для изучения Средней и Восточной Азии в историческом, археологическом, лингвистическом и этнографическом отношениях (in Russian). 2 (2). Printing house of the Imperial Academy of Sciences: 92–110. Archived from the original on 11 February 2022.
- Petri, Bernhard E. (1914). "Вторая поездка в Предбайкалье" [The second trip to Cisbaikalia] (PDF). Известия Русского Комитета для изучения Средней и Восточной Азии в историческом, археологическом, лингвистическом и этнографическом отношениях (in Russian). 2 (3). Printing house of the Imperial Academy of Sciences: 89–107. Archived from the original on 11 February 2022.
- Petri, Bernhard E. (1916). "Отчет о командировке на Байкал в 1916 г." [Report on a trip to Baikal in 1916]. Report of Imperial Academy of Sciences (in Russian). Faculty of Physics and Mathematics of Moscow University: 138–144.
- Petri, Bernhard E. (1922a). Далекое прошлое Бурятского края [The distant past of the Buryat region] (in Russian). Irkutsk: Irkutsk State University.
- Petri, Bernhard E. (1922b). "М. П. Овчинни ков, как археолог" [M. P. Ovchinnikov as an archaeologist]. Сибирские огни (in Russian). 4.
- Petri, Bernhard E. (1922c). "К вопросу об изучении шаманства (по поводу приезда шамана Степанова в Иркутск)" [To the question of the study of shamanism (in connection with the arrival of the shaman Stepanov in Irkutsk)]. The Power of Labor (in Russian) (299). Irkutsk.
- Petri, Bernhard E. (1923a). "Доисторические кузнецы в Прибайкалье. К вопросу о доисторическом прошлом якутов" [Prehistoric blacksmiths in the Baikal region. On the prehistoric past of the Yakuts]. Известия Института народного образования (in Russian). 1. Chita: 62–64.
- Petri, Bernhard E. (1923b). "Школа шаманов у северных бурят" [School of shamans among the Northern Buryats]. Collection of Works of Professors and Teachers (in Russian) (5). Irkutsk: Irkutsk State University: 404–423.
- Petri, Bernhard E. (1924a). "Территориальное родство у северных бурят" [Territorial kinship among the northern Buryats]. Proceedings of the Biological and Geographical Research Institute at the Irkutsk State University (in Russian). 1 (2). Irkutsk: Irkutsk State University.
- Petri, Bernhard E. (1924b). "Элементы родовой связи у северных бурят" [Elements of family ties among northern Buryats]. Siberian Living Antiquity (in Russian) (2). Irkutsk: 98–126.
- Petri, Bernhard E. (1924c). "Брачные нормы у северных бурят" [Marriage norms among northern Buryats]. Collection of Works of Professors and Teachers (in Russian) (4). Irkutsk: Irkutsk State University: 3–32.
- Petri, Bernhard E. (1925). "Внутриродовые отношения у северных бурят" [Intra-clan relations among northern Buryats]. Proceedings of the Biological and Geographical Research Institute at the Irkutsk State University (in Russian). 11 (3). Irkutsk: Irkutsk State University.
- Petri, Bernhard E. (1926a). Древности озера Косогола (Монголия) [Antiquities of Lake Khövsgöl (Mongolia)] (in Russian). Irkutsk: Irkutsk State University. Archived from the original on 11 February 2022.
- Petri, Bernhard E. (1926b). "Степени посвящения монголо-бурятских шаманов" [Degrees of initiation of the Mongol-Buryat shamans]. Proceedings of the Biological and Geographical Research Institute at the Irkutsk State University (in Russian). 2 (4). Irkutsk: Irkutsk State University: 39–75.
- Petri, Bernhard E. (1926c). Программа для составления подворных описей и бюджетов применительно к малым народностям тайги [A program for compiling household inventories and budgets with small peoples of the taiga.] (in Russian). Irkutsk.
- Petri, Bernhard E. (1926d). "Сибирский неолит" [Siberian Neolithic]. Proceedings of the Biological and Geographical Research Institute at the Irkutsk State University (in Russian). 3 (6). Irkutsk: Irkutsk State University: 39–75.
- Petri, Bernhard E. (1927a). Этнография и современность [Ethnography and modernity] (in Russian). Irkutsk.
- Petri, Bernhard E. (1927b). Карагасский суглан [Karagas loam] (in Russian). Irkutsk.
- Petri, Bernhard E. (1927c). "Охотугодья и расселение карагас" [Hunting grounds and resettlement of the Karagas]. Collection of Works of Professors and Teachers (13). Irkutsk: Irkutsk State University.
- Petri, Bernhard E. (1927d). "Сойотская экспедиция, организованная Ир-кутским Местным Комитетом Севера" [Soyot expedition organized by the Irkutsk Local Committee of the North]. Ethnographic Research Among Small Peoples in the Eastern Sayan (Preliminary Data). Irkutsk: 12–20.
- Petri, Bernhard E. (1928a). "VI. Железный период" [VI. Iron Period]. Далекое прошлое Прибайкалья: научно-популярный очерк (in Russian) (2nd ed.). Irkutsk: Irkutsk State University. pp. 55–70. Archived from the original on 11 February 2022.
- Petri, Bernhard E. (1928b). "Задачи дальнейшего исследования туземцев Сибири и метод обследования целых народностей" [The tasks of further research of the natives of Siberia and the method of examining entire nationalities]. Proceedings of the First Siberian Local Lore Research Congress (in Russian). 5. Novosibirsk.
- Petri, Bernhard E. (1928c). Далекое прошлое Прибайкалья. Научно-популярный очерк [The distant past of the Baikal region. Popular science essay.] (in Russian). Irkutsk.
- Petri, Bernhard E. (1928d). Старая вера бурятского народа. Научно-популярный очерк [The old faith of the Buryat people. Popular science essay.] (in Russian). Irkutsk.
- Petri, Bernhard E. (1928e). Бюджет карагасского хозяйства [The budget of the Karagas economy.] (in Russian). Irkutsk.
- Petri, Bernhard E. (1928f). Проект культбазы у малых народов Сибири [The project of a cult base among the small peoples of Siberia] (in Russian). Tomsk.
- Petri, Bernhard E. (1930). Охота и оленеводство у тутурских тунгусов в связи с организа-цией охотхозяйства [Охота и оленеводство у тутурских тунгусов в связи с организа-цией охотхозяйства] (in Russian). Irkutsk.
- Petri, Bernhard E. (2012). "ВИТИМСКИЕ ТУНГУСЫ (ориентировочные данные о тунгусах Витимского района)" [VITIM TUNGUS (indicative data on the Tungus of the Vitim region)]. Izvestia of the Laboratory of Ancient Technologies. 1 (9). Irkutsk: Irkutsk National Research Technical University: 158–164.

=== Books ===
- Sirina, Anna A. (1999). "Забытые страницы сибирской этнографии: Б.Э. Петри" [Forgotten pages of Siberian ethnography: B. E. Petri]. In Tumarkin, Daniil D. (ed.). Репрессированные этнографы [Repressed ethnographers] (PDF) (in Russian). Moscow: Vostočnaja literatura. pp. 57–80. ISBN 5020180580. OCLC 613893817. Archived from the original (PDF) on 9 October 2021.

=== Articles ===
- Ivanov, A. A.; Kalikhman, A. D.; Kalikhman, T. P. (2008). Б.Э. Петри в истории Саянского перекрестка [B.E. Petri in the history of the Sayan Crossroads] (in Russian). Irkutsk: Publishing House "Ottisk".
- Ivanov, G. I. (2012). "Бернгард Петри как ученый-музеевед и организатор музейного дела (по материалам Иркутского областного краеведческого музея)" [Bernhard Petri as a Museum Scientist and Organizer of Museum Affairs (Based on materials from the Irkutsk Regional Museum of Local Lore)]. History. 3 (2). Irkutsk: Irkutsk State University: 63–66.
- Kalikhman, T. P. (2009). "ПО ДЕЛАМ ИХ УЗНАЕТЕ ИХ (К 125-ЛЕТИЮ БЕРНГАРДА ЭДУАРДОВИЧА ПЕТРИ)" [YOU WILL KNOW THEM BY THEIR DEEDS (ON THE 125TH ANNIVERSARY OF BERNGARD EDUARDOVICH PETRI)]. Proceedings of the Russian Academy of Sciences. Geographical Series (in Russian) (5). Moscow: Russian Academy of Sciences.
- Kolesnik, Lyudmila; Pushkina, Tatyana L.; Svinin, Vladimir V. (2012). "ВСОРГО и музейное дело в Иркутске" [VSORGO and museum work in Irkutsk]. История (in Russian). 2 (3–2). Irkutsk Regional Museum of Local Lo: 44–56.
- Konstantinov, Mikhail V. (2012). "Судьбы сибирских ученых эпохи ГУЛАГа" [The fates of the Siberian scientists in the GULAG epoch]. Bulletin of the Buryat State University (in Russian) (7). Ulan-Ude: 84–90.
- Nomokonova, T.; Goryunova, O.; Lozey, R.; Saveliev, N. (2011). "ИСПОЛЬЗОВАНИЕ БУХТЫ УЛАН-ХАДА НА ОЗЕРЕ БАЙКАЛ В ГОЛОЦЕНЕ (ПО ФАУНИСТИЧЕСКИМ МАТЕРИАЛАМ)" [USE OF ULAN-KHADA BAY ON LAKE BAIKAL IN THE HOLOCENE (BY FAUNISTIC MATERIALS)]. The Age of Paleometal (in Russian). 2 (46). Calgary, Alberta: University of Alberta: 30–36.
- Volzhanina, E. A.; Ineshin, E. M. (2012). "МАТЕРИАЛЫ ПРОПАВШЕЙ ЭКСПЕДИЦИИ" [MATERIALS OF THE MISSING EXPEDITION]. Izvestia of the Laboratory of Ancient Technologies. 1 (9). Irkutsk: Irkutsk National Research Technical University: 155–157.

=== Websites ===
- Drobotushenko, N. E.; Konstantinov, M. V. "Энциклопедия Забайкалья". Encyclopedia of Transbaikalia (in Russian). Chita. Archived from the original on 14 August 2022.
- Petri, Olga O.; Valiev, M. T. (2017). "Петри Бернгард Эдуардович. Школа Карла Мая - kmay.ru". Society of Friends of the Karl May School (in Russian). Saint Petersburg. Archived from the original on 15 April 2021.
