= Kurumchi culture =

The Kurumchi culture or the "Kurumchi blacksmiths" (Russian: Курумчинские кузнецы) were the earliest Iron Age archaeological culture of Lake Baikal. Bernhard Petri proposed their existence in the 1920s, speculating that they were the progenitors of the Sakha people. Later, from the 1940s until 1970s, Alexey Okladnikov continued research on the Kurumchi. Renewed research that began in the 1980s into the Kurumchi expanded scholarly understanding of their society.

== Background ==
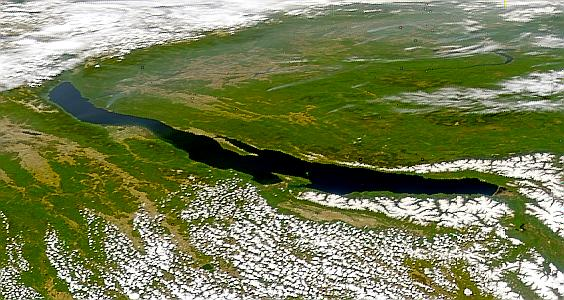
Lake Baikal as seen from space.

Interest in the Sakha (Yakut) people and their cultural origins was minimal until the late 19th century. Political dissident Mikhail P. Ovchinnikov developed his ethnographic and archaeological skills while exiled in Siberia. He interviewed Sakha residents of Olyokminsk about their customs and beliefs. One Sakha account suggests their ancestors were forced north from Lake Baikal to the Lena River. Ovchinnikov also interviewed Buryat informants from Irkutsk, who shared stories of their ancestors displacing a group of blacksmiths from Lake Baikal. These accounts linked the Sakha with the Uryankhay (Russian: Урянхайский), a term typically used for the Tuvans. In 1899, D.A. Kochnev supported this connection based on linguistic evidence.

Ovchinnikov sought to substantiate the southern origins of the Sakha. He discovered evidence of iron and copper smithing, along with iron ore deposits in pits, across Lake Baikal. Near Bratsk and Kirensk arrowheads that he believed resembled Sakha arrowheads were discovered. Outside Irkutsk, he found a piece of shale with a carved image of a woman, which he interpreted as evidence of ancient Turkic peoples living along the Angara River. Ovchinnikov published his ethnographic findings in 1897 and 1898. He theorized that the Sakha originated on the Baraba Steppe, migrating east to the Yenisey River and later Lake Baikal; fleeing north to the Lena due to the Mongol Empire's expansion under Genghis Khan.

== Initial conception ==
In 1912 the Russian Committee for the Study of Central and East Asia sent Bernhard Petri to Irkutsk. He was tasked with documenting the Buryat culture and locating ancient artifacts around Lake Baikal. Near Narin-Kunta a spindle whorl inscribed with Old Turkic script was discovered in a garden bed. The site was located in the Murin River Valley, then part of the Kurumchi khoshun. Petri began an excavation at the location in 1913 and returned the following year to continue the dig. The findings included pottery shards and a small forge. In 1916 Petri explored the cave systems of Olkhon Island. Graves were discovered to be arranged in a row and marked by flat stone slabs. Petri found the funeral structures resembled Buryat yurts, and later by Okladnikov as similar to Evenki dwellings.

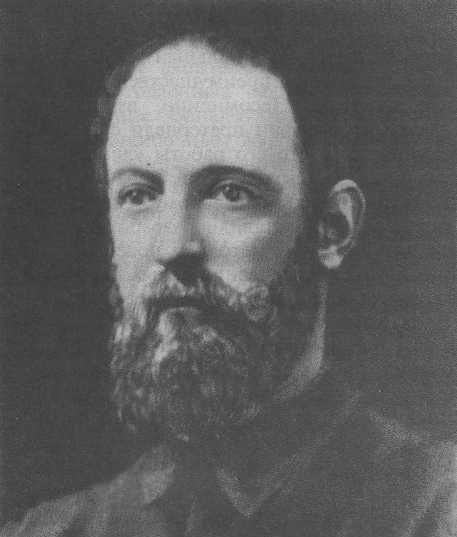
Archeologist Bernhard Petri (1884–1937) proposed the Kurumchi culture during the early 20th century.

During the 1920s Petri published his interpretation of the artifacts he discovered. Lake Baikal was proposed to have once been the center of a society capable of smithing iron. Petri named these people the "Kurumchi blacksmiths" after the Kurumchi khoshun. While their iron kettles were of Chinese origin, they repaired cracks with external patches. According to Petri the assorted Murin river valley artifacts were created by the Kurumchi no later than the 12th century A.D.

The Kurumchi created fortified places of habitation in either bountiful meadows or strategic positions overlooking valleys, inhabited either permanently or seasonally. Despite the limited pastures of the region Petri was convinced that the Kurumchi were pastoralists. In autumn 1923 he led an expedition to Lake Khövsgöl and found ceramic remains he attributed to the Kurumchi, Although the pottery fragments were later assessed by Dashibalov as too incomplete to demonstrate Kurumchi origin. Pavel Khoroshikh, a pupil of Petri's, stated the research performed by Petri substantiated evidence for the southern origin of the Sakha people, previously proposed by Vladimir I. Ogorodnikov, Mikhail P. Ovchinnikov, and Wacław Sieroszewski.

Petri's work was influenced by Ovchinnikov's earlier research. The two men had formed a close working relationship at the Irkutsk city museum, exchanging archaeological findings and theories about Eastern Siberia's ancient history. Their discussions of Sakha ethnogenesis humorously became known as the "Yakut problem." Ovchinnikov's ideas were foundational to Petri's 1922 article Ancient Buryatia Petri proposed that the northern extent of the Kurumchi culture was formed by the Lena headwaters, contemporary Balagansk on the Angara, and the river mouth of the Kichera; while the southern ran from modern Tunka to the Uda. These were the same areas suggested by Ovchinnikov to be the ancestral Sakha homeland.

=== Old Turkic writing ===
Early translators

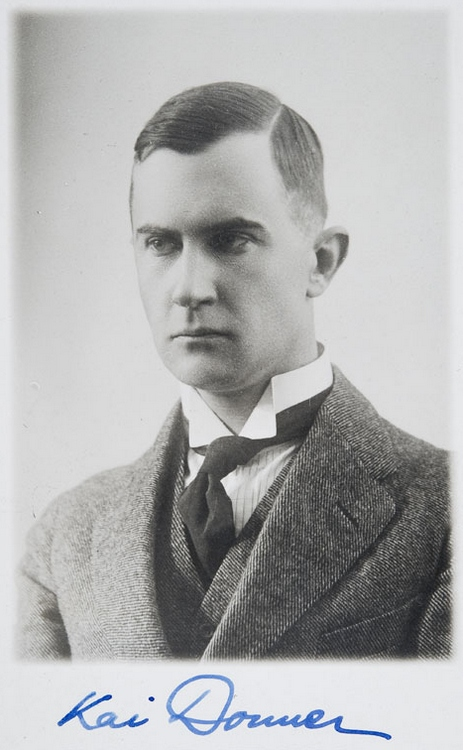
Kai Donner (1888–1935), a Finnish ethnographer who coauthored a paper in 1932 that offered translations for the Old Turkic spindlewhorls.

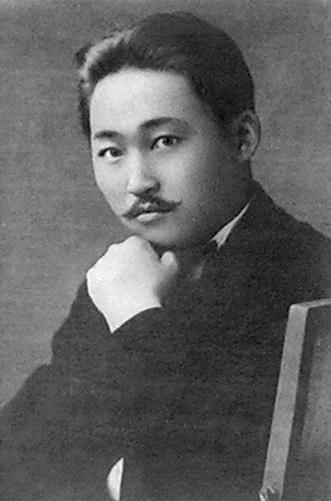
Sakha ethnographer Gavriil Ksenofontov (1888–1938) was an assistant of Petri that sought Sakha words in the spindle whorls.

Two coal spindle whorls inscribed with Old Turkic script and diameters between 3.5–6 cm were discovered north of Lake Baikal. The first spindlewhorl was found outside of Narin-Kunta. During the 1910s the location was the primary Kurumchi dig site. Donner and Räsänen presented a translation of the first spindle whorl subsequently accepted by most researchers. The second spindle whorl was discovered by farmers plowing a field near Shokhtoy. Donner and Räsänen were only able to distinguish some of the eroded characters. They offered "the fifth of the snowy month" and "the fifth month of the arqar year" as partial translations. Gavriil Ksenofontov, S. E. Malov, Hüseyin Orkun, and Louis Bazin subsequently have offered their own translations. In 2019 Tishin made a comprehensive translation of the Shokhtoy spindle whorl. Both spindle whorls have become lost, with only photographs remaining. An assistant and student of Petri, Gavriil Ksenofontov, characterized both spindle whorls as random discoveries found by non-archaeologists. In particular, as the Shokhtoy spindle whorl was discovered by chance outside an organized excavation, Ksenofontov didn't believe the Kurumchi created the item.

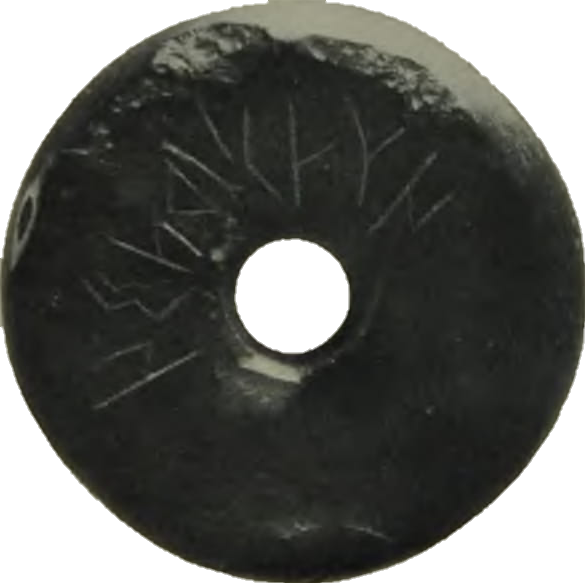
The Narin-Kunta spindle whorl

RTL Inscription: 𐰴 𐰑 𐰺 𐰷 𐰍 𐰺 𐰲 𐰴
Transcription: qadïrïq aγïrčaq
Translation: "A rotating weight"

— Kai Donner & Martti Räsänen (1932)

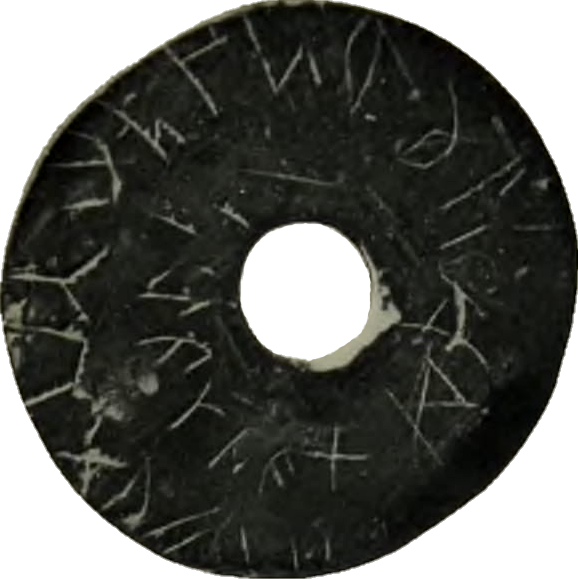
The Shokhtoy spindle whorl

RTL Inscription: 𐰴) 𐰖 𐰑 𐰼 𐰠 𐰏 𐰺 (?𐰞) 𐰺 𐰖 𐰋 (?𐰤 ?𐰔) (?𐰲) (?) 𐱂 𐱈 𐰓 𐰏 𐰵 𐰠 𐰏 𐰀?)
Transcription: āq (?) tāj edärlig arqar ajbäs (?) ašlïq ädgülüg :
Translation: "white (?) stallion saddled; [female] mountain (?) sheep for months [approximately] five; food is good, ah!"

— Vladimir V. Tishin (2019)

=== Protigenitors of the Sakha ===
Petri suggested that military pressure from the ancestral Buryats forced the Kurumchi to leave Lake Baikal for the Middle Lena. Once at their new northerm homeland, Petri proposed that the Kurumchi became the ancestors of the Sakha people. Petri based his hypothesis on three points:

1. Unlike the modern Tungustic and Buryat inhabitants of Western Baikalia, the Kurumchi "made excellent pots with a flat bottom and decorated them with patterns." The Sakha were praised as "great masters" of firing pots.
2. Kurumchi dwellings are similar to балаҕан, balağan (Russian: Балаган), traditional Sakha log yurts.
3. Two spindle whorls were found with Old Turkic inscriptions in Western Baikalia.

He found additional commonalities between the Kurumchi and Sakha in their equestrian equipment like stirrups and bridles, along with their arrows, knives, and humpback scythes (Russian: Коса-горбуша). He concluded with the following:

In addition, all the data suggests that the culture of the "Kurumchi blacksmiths" is very similar to the culture of the Yakuts. This gives us the right to make a cautious assumption that the unknown people "Kurumchi blacksmiths" are none other than the ancestors of the Yakuts. In making such an assumption, we must not forget that it is far from being proven, and that all our data, unfortunately, are only shaky indications of the possibility of our assumption.

==== Early criticism ====
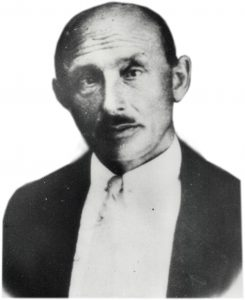
Archivist Efim D. Strelov (1887–1949)

In 1926 archivist and historian Efim D. Strelov wrote a critique of Petri's conclusions. He noted the Sakha lacked spindle whorls and weaving skills entirely. More definitive proof such as specific burial traditions was seen as necessary to establish the existence of the Kurumchi. Petri had compared the Kurumchi and Sakha using eleven analogies to which Strelov made his own counter-arguments. Strelov concluded that the Kurumchi culture was not related to the Sakha.

Kurumchi and Sakha commonalities
Number	Proposed ties by Petri	Counterpoints by Strelov
1.	They had similar pottery ornamentation patterns.	Kurumchi ceramic patterns were only vaguely defined with characteristics that could potentially be found among unrelated peoples in varying locations.
2.	Women were the primary ceramic workers in both societies.	There have been a multitude of societies with women pottery workers.
3.	Kurumchi and Sakha cattle had both interbred with yaks.	Strelov presented evidence that there has been no admixture between yaks and Sakha cattle.
4.	Arrows from the Irkutsk museum collections and the Sakha both have forked ends which was considered a distinctive trait.	The forked end was a widespread arrow design among the Siberian Indigenous. No such arrows were found at Kurumchi sites.
5.	Kurumchi blades are identical to a Sakha knife illustrated in Wacław Sieroszewski's 12 years in the Yakut country.	Sieroszewski himself found Sakha blades broadly related to examples from a variety of cultures.
6.	Horseshoes found at Kurumchi sites resemble Sakha made ones.	The Sakha lacked a word for horseshoe and adopted the Russian: подкова.
7.	Sakha made scythes (Russian: Коса-горбуша) are similar to an example attributed to the Kurumchi.	Sakha scythes clearly originate from Russian designs. (Note: Bair Dashibalov noted that the old scythe used by Petri was found during the plowing of a field rather than at a Kurumchi dig site making it impossible to verify its cultural origin.)
8.	Scissors found at Kurumchi sites share the same shape with Sakha ones.	Sakha scissors were the same as those used by Russian peasants of the Irkutsk oblast.
9.	The Kurumchi smoked from Chinese shaped iron pipes and the Sakha made identical items.	Contemporary iron pipes among the Sakha were introductions from Chinese and Koreans workers of the Olyokma and Vitim gold mines. Their smoking pipes were traditionally made of wood with copper or bone bowls.
10.	Both groups made utensils made of birch bark and horsehair.	Manufacture of horse hair and birch utensils was common among the Siberian Indigenous.
11.	Sakha wooden yurts (Yakut: Балаҕан, romanized: Balağan) and Kurumchi dwellings were both dug into the group and quadrangular in shape.	Sakha yurts were never dug deep enough require steps. Quadrangular structures also existed among the Nanai and Ulch Tungusic peoples of the Amur.

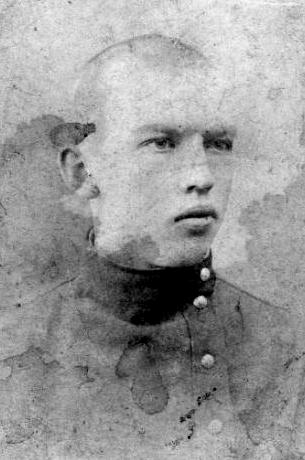
Ethnographer Vasily I. Podgorbunsky (1894–1951?)

Another rebuttal came from Vasily I. Podgorbunsky who was a once a student of Petri. In 1928 he claimed the Sakha and Kurumchi were entirely unrelated and found their ceramics dissimilar. Podgorbunsky did however consider the Sakha descendants from certain Turkic peoples. This was based upon Iron Age pottery fragments found in 1917 during archaeological work performed in the Transbaikal Oblast and Irkutsk Governorate.

== Further research ==
During the Great Purge many Soviet academics, including Petri and Ksenofontov, were executed. Subsequent research into the Kurumchi was pursued by a pupil of Petri's, Alexey Okladnikov. During the early 1940s he led an archeological survey across the entire length of the Lena, from the Baikal Mountains to the river delta on the Arctic Ocean. His team examined ancient settlements and artwork adorning cliffs, which were attributed to the Kurumchi and provided insights into their society. Okladnikov was the first Soviet archaeologist to use comparable representations on artifacts to date rock images. During 1955 his findings were published in Yakutia: Before its incorporation into the Russian State. In the tome Okladnikov expanded upon work of his predecessors and presented new material evidence for his conclusions. He praised the iron smithing capabilities of the Kurumchi. At their settlements he observed that "Everywhere are strewn cinders, smith's deposits, fragments of hearths, fragments of clay pipe-nozzles used with the blacksmith's bellows, and whole and broken crucibles." A complete account of the Lena cliff artwork wasn't published until 1977.

Okladnikov defended the hypothesis that the Kurumchi were the Sakha progenitors. The nadir of the Kurumchi culture was estimated to be between the 6th to 8th centuries A.D. He consider their society analogous to the Yenisei Kyrgyz, being composed of "simple people and aristocrats." Okladnikov connected the Kurumchi to the Kurykans, a people mentioned in Chinese historical sources. Despite earlier criticisms, he found similarities between Kurumchi and Sakha pottery traditions. The early 11th century C.E. was speculated to be when Mongolic peoples migrated to Lake Baikal. The displaced Kurumchi were forced to the Lena, eventually reaching the modern Okladnikov presented linguistic evidence for the southern origin of the Sakha. Words describing animals found south of the Yakut ASSR, such as snow leopards and tigers exist in the Sakha language. Further, there is a Sakha word for camel, тэбиэн, preserved in historic epics and idioms, that descends from Proto-Turkic.

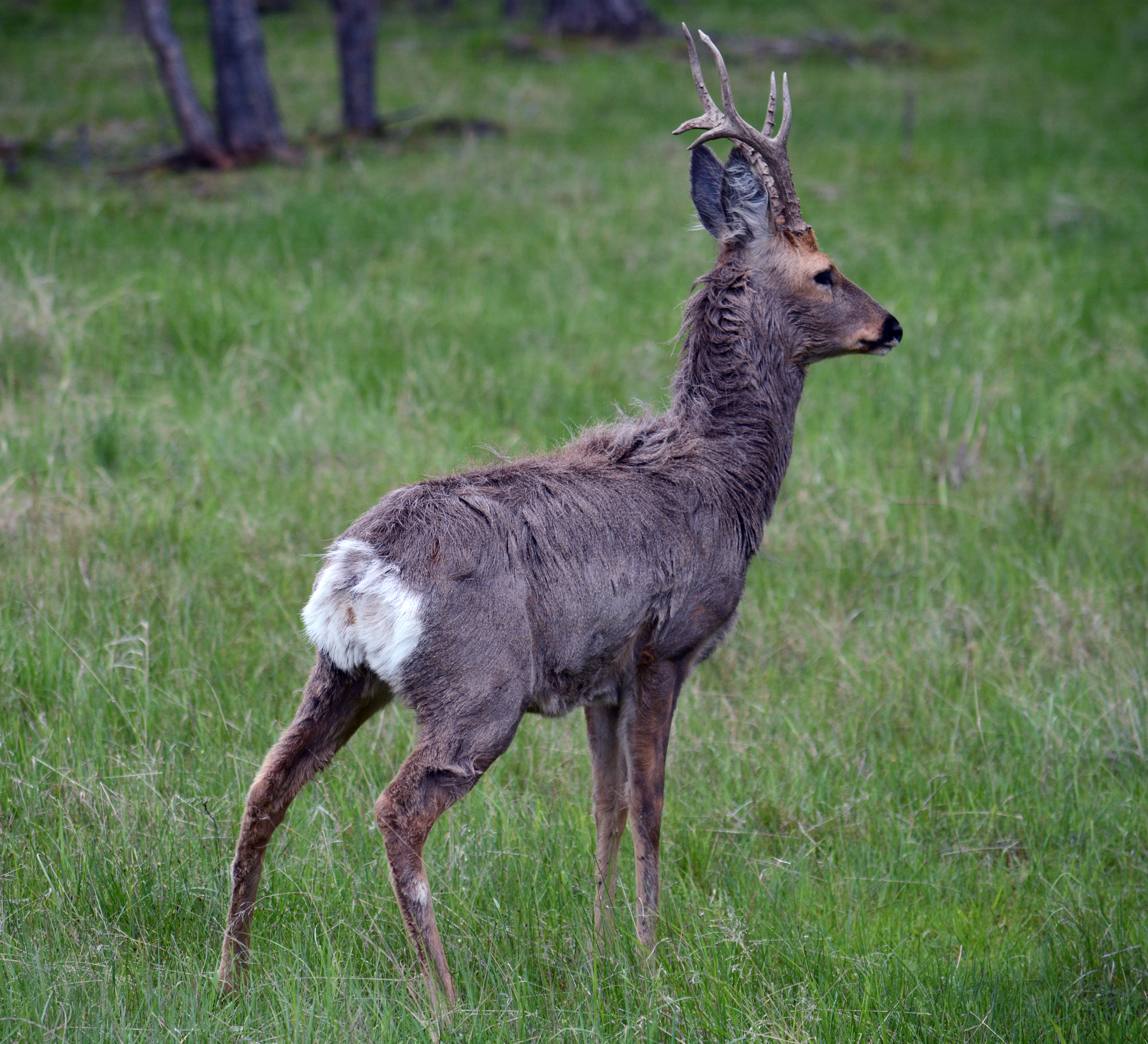
Siberian roe deer

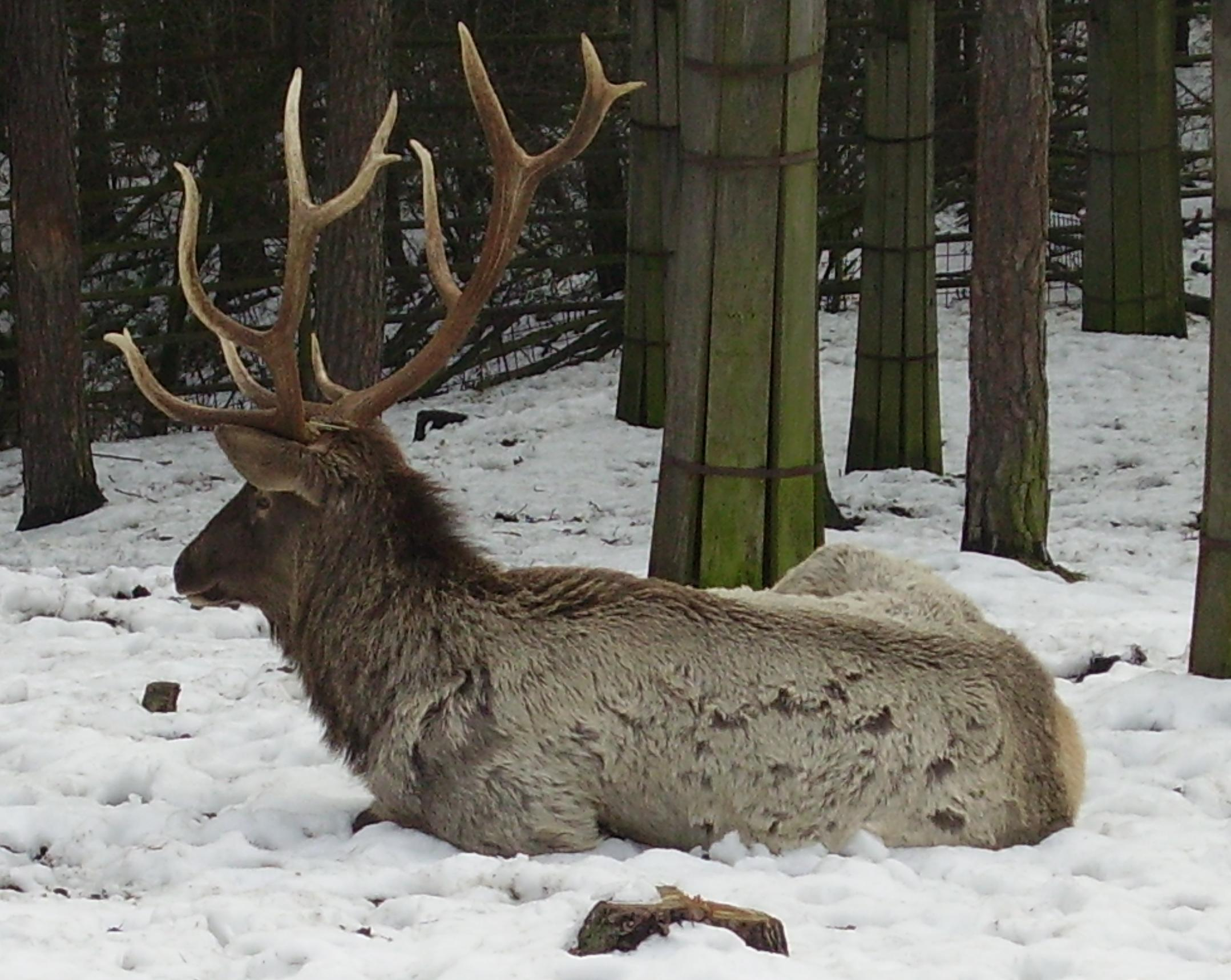
The Altai wapiti, an elk subspecies

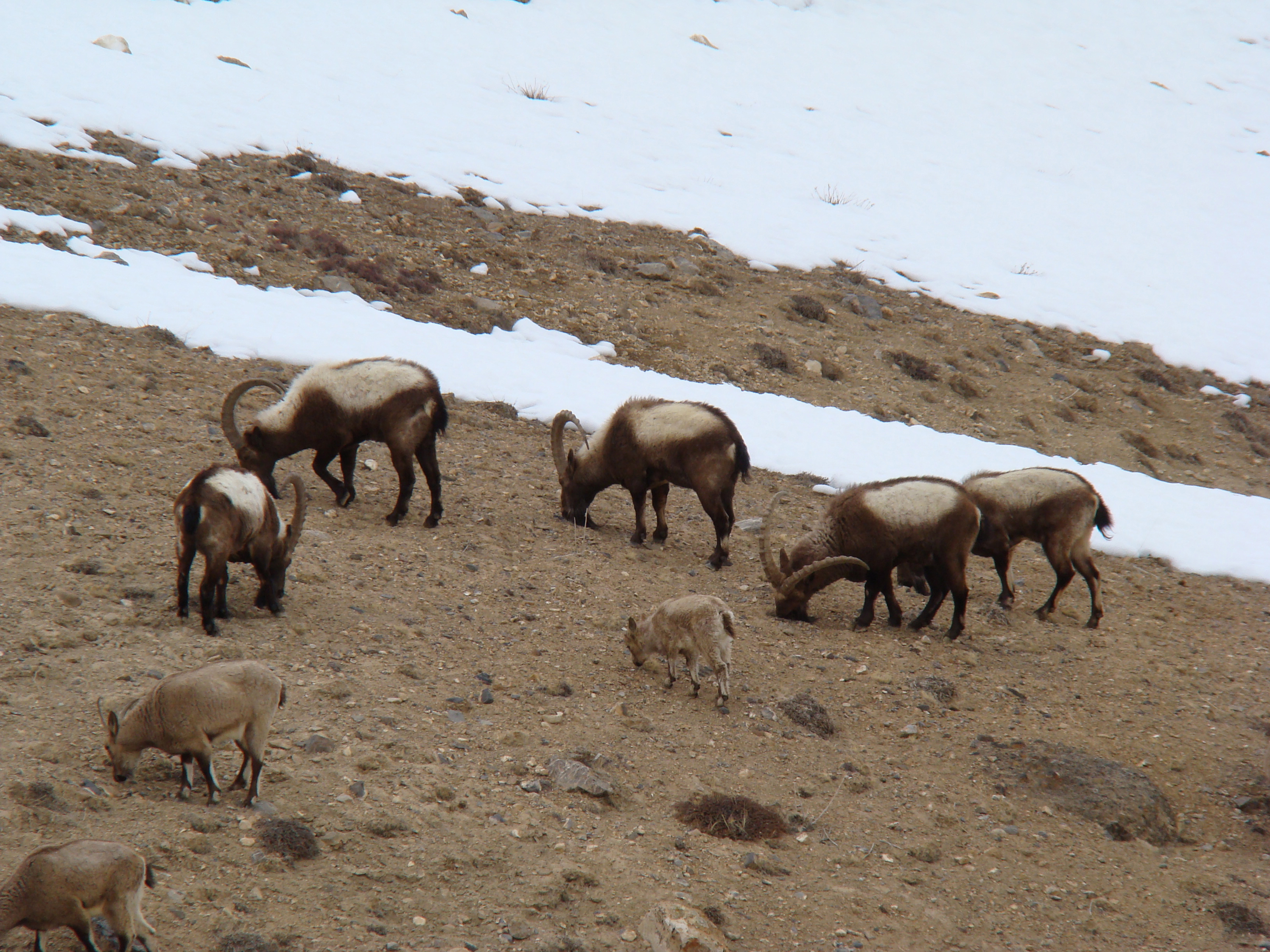
Siberian Ibex herd

Boar, elk, ibex, and roe deer were commonly depicted and their remains have been recovered at Kurumchi settlements; while sheep bones are present at Olkhon Island sites. Highly stylized bird carvings were likely inspired by geese, swans, and other waterfowl. Cattle and horse bone fragments were recovered at Kurumchi sites and common subjects in cliff artwork. Equestrian herds maintained by the Kurumchi were speculated to originate from the Yenisei steppe and not the Mongolian Plateau. The appearance of Bactrian camel drawings demonstrated their commercial significance and possible ties to the steppe cultures of Inner Asia. Certain figures are depicted wearing possibly chainmail. Hunting scenes show figures using lassos and nets, both of which were employed by various steppe cultures. According to Okladnikov neither tool was used in Baikalia prior to the Kurumchi.

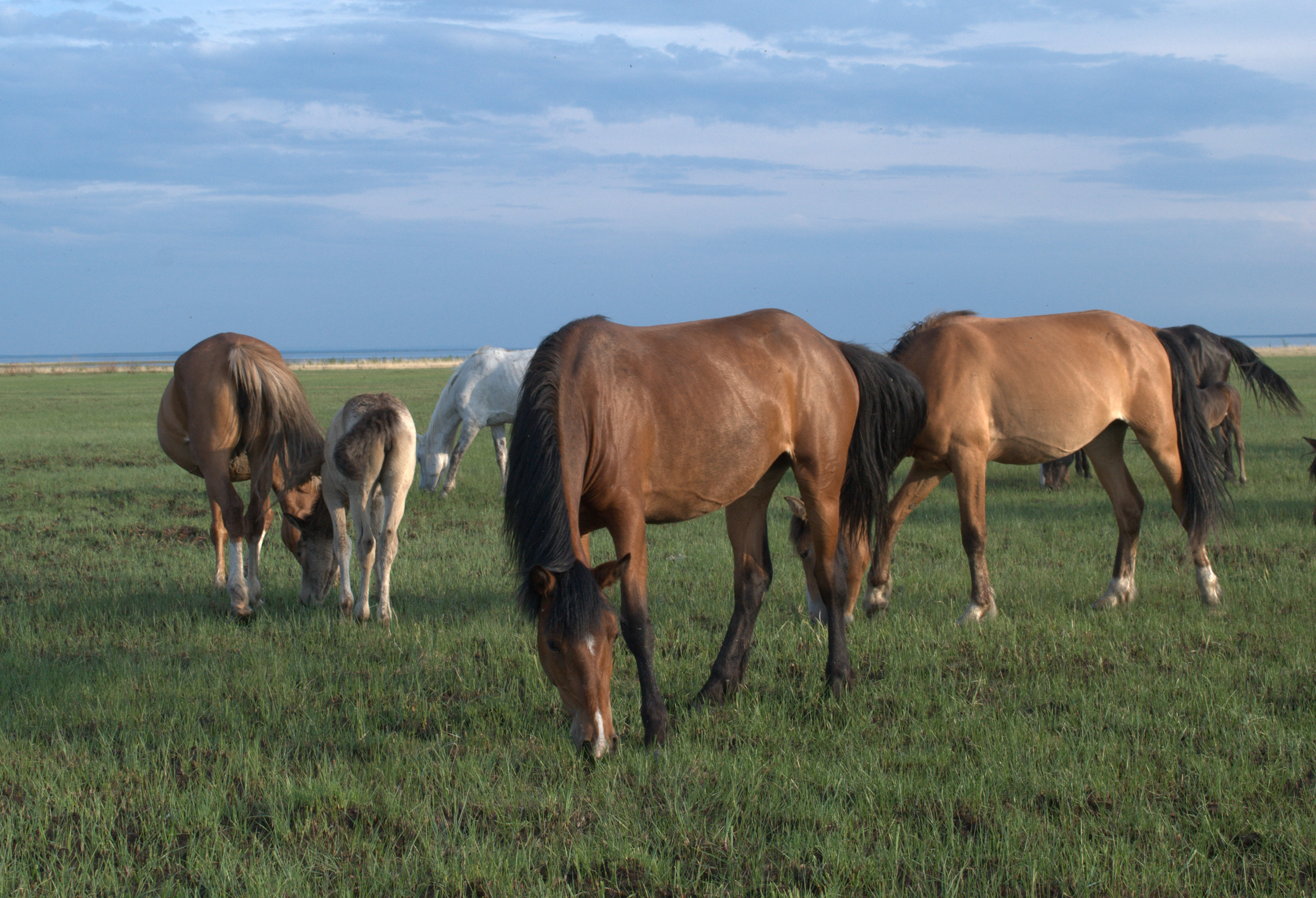
Buryat horses

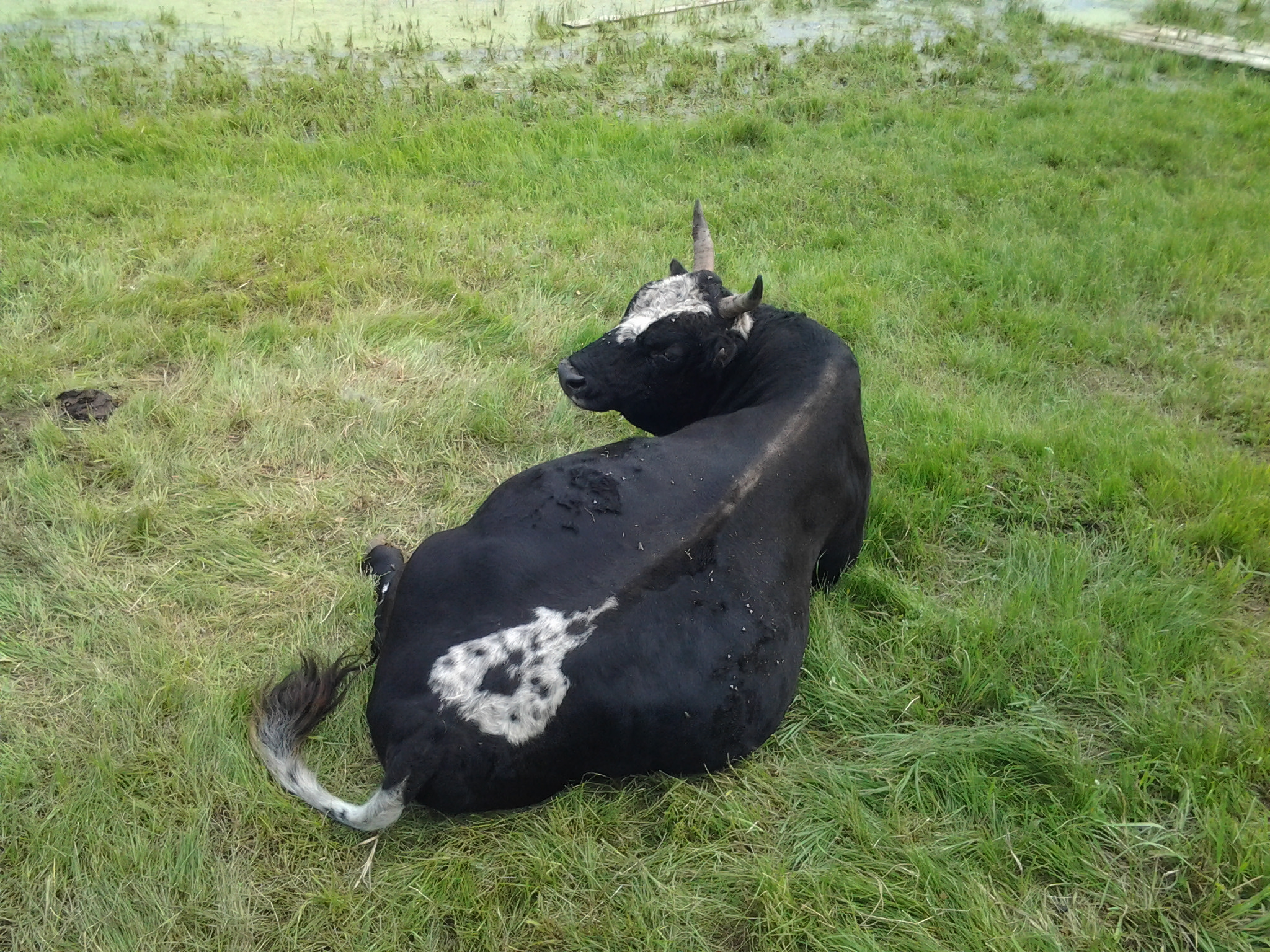
A Sakha cow

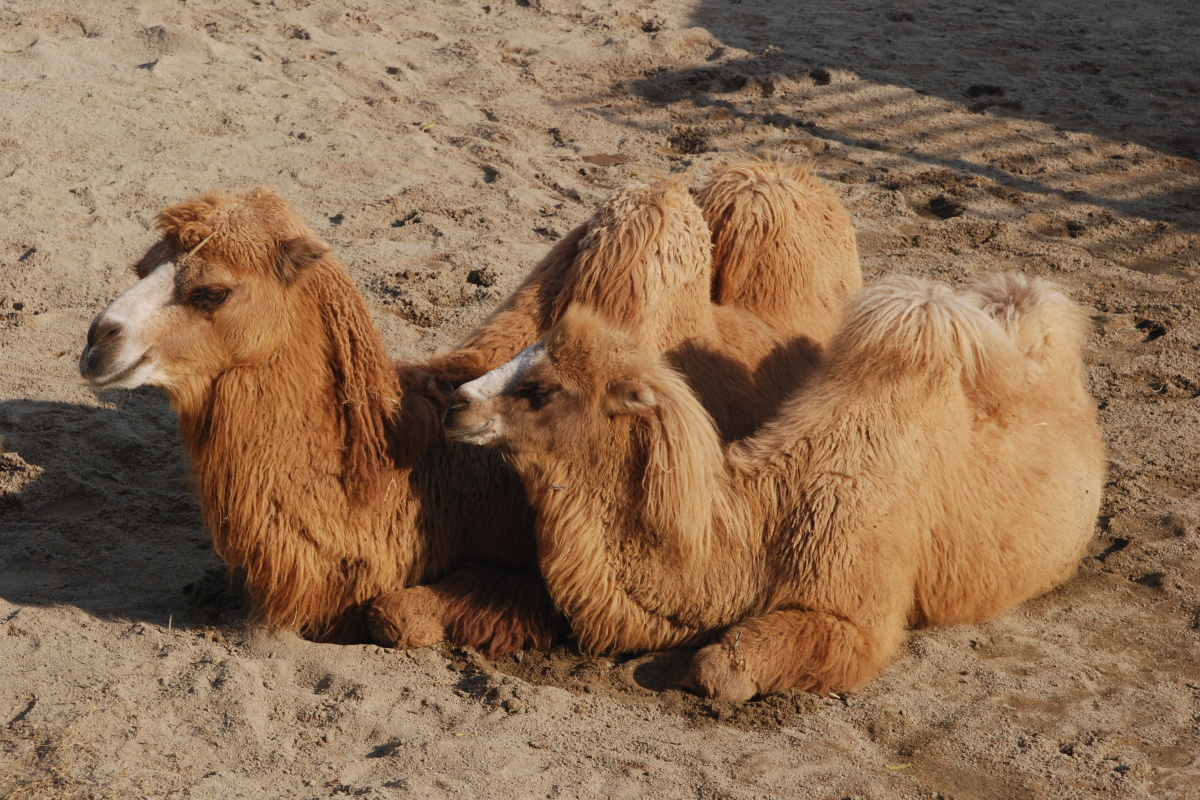
Bactrian camels

Okladnikov considered the Kurumchi the first society in Baikalia to practice agriculture. In the Angara watershed, nearby Kulakova, he discovered garden beds outside ancient stockades. The findings were considered to be Kurumchi constructions. According to Okladnikov, irrigation was used to bolster the productivity of pasturelands. One surviving series of ancient ditches were found 3 km outside Ust-Ordynsky, starting near Mt. Ulan-Zola-Tologoy (Russian: Улан-Зола-Тологой). Two 5 km long irrigation canals were placed 100-150m apart and dug up to 1 meter deep. Secondary lines were made off of the main lines to water additional fields. From the waterfalls of the Idyga (Russian: Идыга) the channels approached the right bank of the Kuda. A fortified position was found near the fields apparently created to block access to them.

== Modern status ==
Beginning in 1984, a ten-year archaeological survey was begun by the Buryat Scientific Center Institute of Social Sciences to examine Kurumchi settlements and monuments of Lake Baikal. The findings of the survey were published by Bair Dashibalov in 1995. Dashibalov connected the Kurumchi ethnogenesis with the creation of empires controlling the Mongolian Plateau, such as the Xiongnu, which generally shielded Lake Baikal from Central Asian steppe raiders. This created conditions for the area becoming "a kind of niche for the formation of an ethnos." Kurumchi society lasted from the sixth to fourteenth centuries A.D. This chronology has been accepted by other scholars. The funerary changes introduced in the third period are credited to the Khori, a Mongolic-speaking people, who subjugated the Kurykans.

The Kurumchi were determined to be a semi-nomadic society that maintained herds of cattle for subsistence and commerce. Supplemental nutritional sources came from cultivated plants like barley, hemp, millet, and wheat. According to traditional Chinese accounts, the Kurykans collected taxes from the taiga inhabitants outside Lake Baikal and gave some of the proceeds to the Göktürks. Bronze, silver, and gold kolts, as well as glass beads, are among the items discovered in Kurumchi burials that most likely came from these exchanges with the Göktürks.

Kurumchi chronology by Dashibalov:
Name	Centuries	Notable characteristics
Kurkut period	6-7th A.D.	Graves are generally either simple pits or stone boxes, or more rarely logs. Arrowheads similar to those made by Turkic peoples in the Altai-Sayan region between the sixth and seventh centuries A.D.
Bologonsky period	8-10th A.D.	Saddles placed upon the feet of the deceased. Wooden roof-like structures crafted above burials. Stirrups like those produced by the Saltovo-Mayaki culture in the eighth and ninth centuries A.D. Arrowheads similar to ninth and tenth century A.D. Yenisei Kirghiz productions.
Kharantsy period	11-12th A.D.	The least researched of the four periods; the appearance of birch sacks as coffins and sacrificed ram legs is similar to Mongolic burials from the eleventh to the fourteenth century A.D.
Telyatnikovo period	13-14th A.D.	Continued use of burial customs that were first used in the previous period. Stirrups comparable to those used in the 13th and 14th centuries A.D. by the Mongolian Empire. Arrowheads are similar to those made in the eleventh and twelfth centuries A.D. by the Askizsky and Jurchens.

According to Vladimir Tishin the two spindle whorls with Old Turkic inscriptions were produced locally between the mid-9th and 12th centuries A.D. However, their discovery outside of archaeological digs by non-professionals and poor documentation by Petri made their specific cultural origins impossible to categorize.

== Bibliography ==
=== Books ===
- Bazin, Louis (1991). Les systèmes chronologiques dans le monde turc ancient [Chronological Systems in the Ancient Turkic world] (in French). Budapest: Akadémiai Kiadó.
- Clauson, Gerard (1972). An Etymological Dictionary of Pre-Thirteenth-Century Turkish. Oxford: Clarendon Press.
- Dashibalov, Bair B. (1994). "Находки культуры «курумчинских кузнецов» из раскопок Б.Э. Петри" [Findings of the "Kurumchi smiths" culture from B.E. Petri's excavations]. Этнокультурные процессы в Южной Сибири и Центральной Азии в I-II тысячелетии н.э. [Ethnocultural processes in South Siberia and Central Asia in the I-II Millennium AD] (in Russian). Kemerovo. pp. 190–207. ISBN 5-202-00032-4. Archived from the original on 2020-02-18.
- Dashibalov, Bair B. (1995). Kyzlasov, L. R. (ed.). Археологические памятники курыкан и хори [Kurykan and Khori archaeological sites] (in Russian). Ulan-Ude: Russian Academy of Science, Siberian Branch, Buryat Scientific Center Institute of Social Sciences. ISBN 5-7623-0877-4.
- Dashibalov, Bair B. (2003). "НА БАЙКАЛЬСКИХ БЕРЕГАХ: «Якутская проблема» в археологии Прибайкалья" [ON THE BAYKAL SHORES: The "Yakut Problem" in the Archaeology of the Baikal Region]. Истоки: от древних хори-монголов к бурятам. Очерки [Origins: from the ancient Hori-Mongols to the Buryats. Essays] (in Russian). Buryat Scientific Center of the Siberian Branch of the Russian Academy of Sciences. ISBN 5-7925-0127-0.
- Ivanov, G. L. (2020). "КУРУМЧИНСКАЯ КУЛЬТУРА БАЙКАЛЬСКОЙ СИБИРИ: СОВРЕМЕННОЕ СОСТОЯНИЕ И ДАЛЬНЕЙШИЕ ПЕРСПЕКТИВЫ ИЗУЧЕНИЯ" [Kurumchi culture of Baikal Siberia: current state further prospects of study]. Марғұлан оқулары - 2020 [Margulan readings - 2020]. Proceedings of the International scientific and practical conference "Great Steppe in light of archaeological and interdisciplinary research" (Almaty, September 17–18, 2020) (in Russian). Vol. 1. Almaty: Margulan Institute of Archaeology. pp. 445–448. ISBN 978-601-7106-43-0.
- Khudyakov, Yuliy S. (1980). Вооружение енисейских кыргызов VI-XII вв [Armament of the Yenisei Kyrgyz from the VI-XII centuries] (in Russian). Novosibirsk: Siberian Branch of the Russian Academy of Sciences. Archived from the original on 2021-11-21.
- Kobeleva, O. N.; Skvortsova, M. A.; Sivushkova, T. O.; Permyakov, D. V. (2013). «ГОСУДАРСТВЕННЫЙ АРХИВ ИРКУТСКОЙ ОБЛАСТИ» ПУТЕВОДИТЕЛЬ ПО ФОНДАМ ЛИЧНОГО ПРОИСХОЖДЕНИЯ ГОСУДАРСТВЕННОГО АРХИВА ИРКУТСКОЙ ОБЛАСТИ ["State Archive of the Irkutsk region" Guide to the funds of personal origin of the Archive of the Irkutsk Region] (in Russian). Irkutsk.
- Ksenofontov, Gavriil V. (1992). Ураанхай-сахалар. Очерки по древней истории якутов [Uraanghai-Sakhalar. Essays on an Early History of Yakuts] (in Russian). Vol. 1. Yakutsk: National Press of Republic Yakutia (Sakha).
- Kyzlasov, Leonid R. (1969). История Тувы в средние века [History of Tuva in the Middle Ages] (PDF) (in Russian). Moscow: Publishing House of Moscow State University. Archived from the original (PDF) on 2017-07-24.
- Kyzlasov, Leonid R. (1983). Аскизская культура Южной Сибири X-XIV вв [Askiz culture of Southern Siberia X-XIV centuries]. Материалы и исследования по археологии СССР (in Russian). Moscow: Nauka. Archived from the original on 2020-10-31.
- Melkheev, M. N. (1969). Географические названия Восточной Сибири [Geographical names of Eastern Siberia] (in Russian). Irkutsk: East-Siberian Book Publishing House.
- Okladnikov, Alexey P. (1976). История и культура Бурятии [The History and Culture of Buryatia] (in Russian). Ulan-Ude: Buryat Book Publishing House.
- Okladnikov, Alexey P. (1970). Michael, Henry N. (ed.). Якутия до присоединения к русскому государству [Yakutia: Before its incorporation into the Russian State]. Anthropology of the North: Translations from Russian Sources. Montreal & London: McGill-Queen's University Press. ISBN 978-0-7735-9068-7 – via Internet Archive.
- Okladnikov, Alexey P. (1977). Петроглифы Верхней Лены [Petroglyphs of the Upper Lena] (in Russian). Leningrad: Nauka.
- Orkun, Hüseyin N. (1994). Eski Türk yazıtları [Old Turkic Inscriptions] (in Turkish). Ankara: Turkish Historical Society Press.
- Petri, Bernhard E. (1922a). Далекое прошлое Бурятского края [The distant past of the Buryat region] (in Russian). Irkutsk: Irkutsk State University.
- Petri, Bernhard E. (1926a). Древности озера Косогола (Монголия) [Antiquities of Lake Khövsgöl (Mongolia)] (in Russian). Irkutsk: Irkutsk State University. Archived from the original on 2022-02-11.
- Petri, Bernhard E. (1928). "VI. Железный период" [VI. Iron Period]. Далекое прошлое Прибайкалья: научно-популярный очерк (in Russian) (2nd ed.). Irkutsk: Irkutsk State University. pp. 55–70. Archived from the original on 2022-02-11.
- Pletneva, Svetlana A. (1967). От кочевий к городам. Салтово-маяцкая культура [From nomad camps to cities. Saltovo-Mayaki culture] (in Russian). Moscow: Nauka. Archived from the original on 2020-07-25.
- Ponomareva, Irina (2022). "A history of rock research in Russia". In Hampson, Jamie; Challis, Sam; Goldhahn, Joakim (eds.). Powerful Pictures: Rock Art Research Histories around the World. Oxford: Archaeopress. pp. 160–172. ISBN 9781803273884.
- Shcherbak, A. M. (1961). "Названия домашних и диких животных в тюркских языках" [Names of Domestic and Wild Animals in Turkic Languages]. Историческое развитие лексики тюркских языков [A Historical Development of the Turkic Lexicon] (in Russian). Moscow: USSR Academy of Sciences Publishing House. pp. 82–172.
- Sirina, Anna A. (1999). "Забытые страницы сибирской этнографии: Б.Э. Петри" [Forgotten pages of Siberian ethnography: B. E. Petri]. In Tumarkin, Daniil D. (ed.). Репрессированные этнографы [Repressed ethnographers] (PDF) (in Russian). Moscow: Vostočnaja literatura. pp. 57–80. ISBN 5020180580. OCLC 613893817. Archived from the original (PDF) on 2021-10-09.

=== Articles ===
- Berdnikov, I. M. (2018). "Неолит Прибайкалья: история одной дискуссии" [The Baikal region: the history of one discussion]. Geoarchaeology Ethnology Anthropology (in Russian). 26. Irkutsk: Irkutsk State University: 3–45. doi:10.26516/2227-2380.2018.26.3.
- Dashibalov, Bair (2000). "Курумчинская культура Байкальской Сибири" [Kurumchinskaya culture of Baikal Siberia]. Russia and the Asia-Pacific (in Russian) (2). Vladivostok: Far Eastern Branch of the Russian Academy of Sciences: 35–44.
- Donner, Kai; Räsänen, Martti (1932). "Zwei neue türkische Runenin-schriften" [Two New Turkic Runic Inscriptions]. Journal de la Société Finno-Ougrienne (in German). 45 (2): 1–7.
- Khoroshikh, Pavel P. (1924). "Исследования каменного и железного века Иркутского края (остров Ольхой)" [Studies of the Stone and Iron Ages of the Irkutsk Territory (Olkhoy Island)]. Известия Биолого-географического научно-исследовательского института при Государственном Иркутском университете (in Russian). 1 (1). Irkutsk State University.
- Kochnev, D. A. (1899). "Очерки юридического быта якутов" [Essays on the legal life of the Yakuts]. Proceedings of the Society of Archeology, History, Ethnography at the Imperial Kazan University. 15 (2). Imperial Kazan University.
- Kolesnik, Lyudmila; Pushkina, Tatyana L.; Svinin, Vladimir V. (2012). "ВСОРГО и музейное дело в Иркутске" [VSORGO and museum work in Irkutsk]. История (in Russian). 2 (3–2). Irkutsk Regional Museum of Local Lo: 44–56.
- Ksenofontov, Gavriil V. (1933). "Расшифровка двух памятников орхонской письменности из западного Прибайкалья М. Ресененом" [Decipherment of Two Orkhon Writing Monuments from Western Baikal Region made by M. Räsänen]. Yazyk I Myshlenie (in Russian). 1: 170–173.
- Ksenofontov, Gavriil V. (2005). "Письмена древнетюркского населения Предбайкалья: рукописи из архива" [Written Monuments of the Old Turkic Population in Western Baikal Region]. Ilin (in Russian). 5: 55–66.
- Malov, S. E. (1936). "Новые памятники с турецкими рунами" [New Turkic Monuments Containing Runes]. Yazyk I Myshlenie (in Russian). 6–7. Moscow, Leningrad: 251–279.
- Mansheev, Dorzha (2010). "Генезис традиционной системы хозяйствования скотоводов Северо-Востока Центральной Азии" [Genesis of traditional system of cattlemen's management of the North-East of Central Siberia]. Bulletin of the Buryat State University (in Russian) (8). Ulan-Ude: Buryat State University: 216–220.
- Ovchinnikov, Mikhail P. (1897a). "Из материалов по этнографии якутов" [From the materials on the ethnography of the Yakuts]. Этнографическое обозрение (in Russian) (3). Society of Devotees of Natural Science, Anthropology, and Ethnography: 148–184 – via Internet Archive.
- Ovchinnikov, Mikhail P. (1897b). "Из материалов по этнографии якутов" [From the materials on the ethnography of the Yakuts]. Этнографическое обозрение (4). Moscow: Society of Devotees of Natural Science, Anthropology, and Ethnography: 77–88.
- Ovchinnikov, Mikhail P. (1898). "Из материалов по этнографии якутов" [From the materials on the ethnography of the Yakuts]. Этнографическое обозрение (in Russian). 34 (1). Moscow: Society of Devotees of Natural Science, Anthropology, and Ethnography: 101–113 – via Internet Archive.
- Petri, Bernhard E.; Mikhailov, Vasily A. (1913). "Отчет о командировке Б. Э. Петри и В. А. Михайлова" [Report on the trip of B. E. Petri and V. A. Mikhailov] (PDF). Известия Русского Комитета для изучения Средней и Восточной Азии в историческом, археологическом, лингвистическом и этнографическом отношениях (in Russian). 2 (2). Printing house of the Imperial Academy of Sciences: 92–110. Archived from the original on 2022-02-11.
- Petri, Bernhard E. (1914). "Вторая поездка в Предбайкалье" [The second trip to Cisbaikalia] (PDF). Известия Русского Комитета для изучения Средней и Восточной Азии в историческом, археологическом, лингвистическом и этнографическом отношениях (in Russian). 2 (3). Printing house of the Imperial Academy of Sciences: 89–107. Archived from the original on 2022-02-11.
- Petri, Bernhard E. (1916). "Отчет о командировке на Байкал в 1916 г." [Report on a trip to Baikal in 1916]. Report of Imperial Academy of Sciences (in Russian). Faculty of Physics and Mathematics of Moscow University: 138–144.
- Petri, Bernhard E. (1922b). "М. П. Овчинников, как археолог" [M. P. Ovchinnikov as an archaeologist]. Сибирские огни (in Russian). 4 (4): 99–104. Archived from the original on 2023-12-11.
- Petri, Bernhard E. (1923a). "Доисторические кузнецы в Прибайкалье. К вопросу о доисторическом прошлом якутов" [Prehistoric blacksmiths in the Baikal region. On the prehistoric past of the Yakuts]. Известия Института народного образования (in Russian). 1. Chita: 62–64.
- Podgorbunsky, Vasily I. (1928). "Заметки по изучению гончарства якутов" [Notes on the study of Yakut pottery]. Сибирская живая старина (in Russian) (7): 127–144.
- Savinov, Dmitry G. (2013). "Археологические материалы о южном компоненте в культурогенезе якутов" [Archaeological materials about the southern component in the cultural genesis of the Yakuts] (PDF). North-Eastern Humanitarian Bulletin (in Russian) (2). Yakutsk: Institute for Humanities Research and Indigenous Studies of the North of Siberian branch of the Russian Academy of Sciences: 59–71. Archived from the original (PDF) on 2022-04-02.
- Strelov, E. D. (1926). "К вопросу о доисторическом прошлом якутов / по поводу брошюры проф. Б. Э. Петри" [On the question of the prehistoric past of the Yakuts / on the booklet "Prehistoric Blacksmiths in the Baikal region" by Prof. B.E. Petri]. Саха Кескиле (in Russian) (3): 5–25.
- Tishin, Vladimir V. (2019). "Две древнетюркские рунические надписи на пряслицах с территории Западного Прибайкалья: история находок и их историко-культурное значение" [Two Old Turkic Runic Inscriptions on Spindle-Wheels from the Territory of Western Baikal Region: the History of Finds and Their Historical and Cultural Significance]. Bulletin of the Irkutsk State University. Geoarchaeology, Ethnology, and Anthropology Series. 27. Irkutsk: Irkutsk State University: 36–55. doi:10.26516/2227-2380.2019.27.36. S2CID 213996846.
- Ushnitskiy, Vasiliy V. (2016a). "Вклад российских путешественников и исследователей XVIII – начала XX в. в изучение этногенеза народа саха" [The contribution of Russian travelers and researchers of the 18th – early 20th centuries to the study of the ethnogenesis of the Sakha people]. Vestnik Tomskogo Gosudarstvennogo Universiteta (in Russian) (407). Yakutsk: Institute of the Humanities and the Indigenous Peoples: 150–155. doi:10.17223/15617793/407/23. Archived from the original on 2022-01-21.
- Ushnitskiy, Vasiliy. V. (2016b). "The Problem of the Sakha People's Ethnogenesis: A New Approach". Journal of Siberian Federal University. Humanities & Social Sciences. 8: 1822–1840. doi:10.17516/1997-1370-2016-9-8-1822-1840.
