= Kurykans =

Extinct Turkic people

The Kurykans (Chinese: 骨利干 pinyin: Gǔlìgān < Middle Chinese ZS: *kuət̚-liɪ^{H}-kɑn) were a Turkic Tiele tribe, that inhabited the Lake Baikal area in the 6th century CE. Early Kurykans migrated from the area of the Yenisey river.

According to the article on "the Origin of Yakuts, Analysis of the Y-Chromosome Haplotypes", published by the researchers from the Tomsk National Research Medical Center of the Russian Academy of Sciences in the Russian "Molecular Biology" journal in 2008:

Kurykans were largely displaced from their ancestral territories in the 6th c. AD. According to the inscription of the Bilge Kagan, Uch-Kurykans (Union of Three Kurykan tribes, Guligan of the Chinese chronicles) sent their ambassadors to the Bumyn Kagan funeral in 552 and/or his brother Istemi Kagan in 576. Kurykans are listed among the enemies of Ilterish Kagan (r. 682–694), father of Bilge Kagan (r. 717–734). Ilterish Kagan campaigned against Uch-Kurykans 47 times, and gave 20 battles. Kurykans were not the natives of their Western Baikal territory, their distinct burial tradition appears suddenly in the 6th c. Quite logically, they appeared in the Baikal refuge as exiles from some distant place, and equally logically they were a fraction of the larger tribe. The other fractions, most likely carrying their distinct burial traditions, their language, and their genetical makeup, fled in other directions at the same time, ca. 5th-6th cc.

Gumilyov and Okladnikov proposed that Kurykans were ancestors of Yakuts, though this is still uncertain. Peter B. Golden notes that the name Kurykan is etymologisable on the basis of Mongolic quriğan "lamb" (compare Khalkha: хурга hurga < Middle Mongolian quraɣ-a(n)) yet no additional evidence exists that Kurykans also spoke a Mongolic language. In translation from the Old Turkic, word quri'qan ~ qoriyan is translated as a camp, or a military camp and has parallels in the old written Mongolian language in the form of khogiua(n) ~ xoruya(n). Thus, "kurykan", perhaps, in its essence, is not an ethnonym, but a common name in relation to the region and the territorial community that inhabits it, at least at an early stage. Therefore, a possible translation of the term "uch kurykan" is "three military camps".

Prior to their resettlement, the Yakuts were somewhat influenced by the then-dominant Mongolian culture. The Yakuts originally lived around Olkhon and the region of Lake Baikal. Beginning in the 13th century they migrated to the basins of the Middle Lena, the Aldan and Vilyuy rivers under the pressure of the rising Mongols. The northern Yakuts were largely hunters, fishermen and reindeer herders, while the southern Yakuts raised cattle and horses.

== See also ==
- Kurumchi culture
