= Glazkov culture =

Archaeological culture in Lake Baikal area

- Location of the Glazkov culture, with other contemporary cultures c. -2000 BCE.
- Alternative names: Glazkovo, Glazkovskaya
- Horizon: Indigenous peoples of Siberia
- Geographical range: Irkutsk, Siberia
- Period: Bronze Age
- Dates: c. 2200 BCE - 1200 BCE
- Type site: Glazkov (Irkutsk)

The Glazkov culture, Glazkovo culture, or Glazkovskaya culture (2200-1200 BCE), was an archaeological culture in the Lake Baikal area during the Early Bronze Age.

Glazkovs is a conditional name for the group of the ancient tribes inhabiting Siberia in the 2nd millennium BCE (Glazkov time) the headwaters of Angara river. Glazkov culture is named after a suburb of the city Irkutsk, where it was first found.

== Areal ==
Archeologists distinguish in the 2nd millennium BCE Southern Siberia two synchronous independent cultures: Glazkov in the east and the Andronovo culture in the west.

"In the Baikal territory lived a Glazkov group of related tribes, most likely the ancestors of modern Evenks, Evens or Yukagirs. Their culture was very close to the culture of the inhabitants of the upper Amur and Northern Manchuria, and of Mongolia to the Great Wall of China and Ordos Loop. It is possible, hence, that all this extensive area was populated by peoples culturally related with the hunter and fisher tribes of Neolith and Early Bronze... probably speaking related tribal languages". Later the carriers of the southern part Glazkov culture tribes converged with some ancestors of the Huns, and intermixed with them. In the 18th century BCE the elements of the Andronovo culture seized the Minusinsk depression and almost encountered the Glazkovs on the Yenisei. Glazkovs and Andronovs played a secondary role in the 2nd millennium BCE Southern Siberia.

== Culture ==
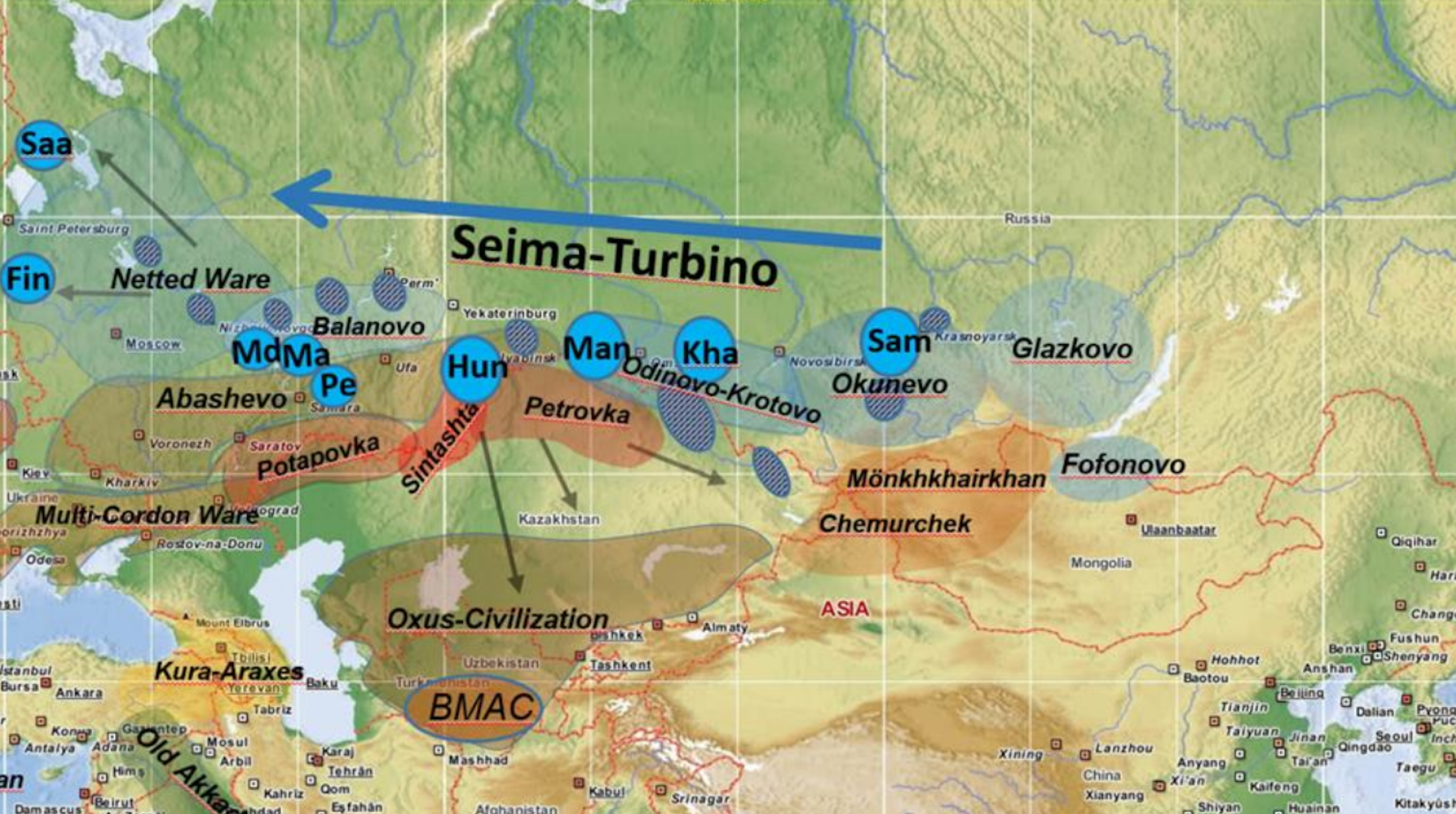
The Glaznovo culture and Eurasian archaeological cultures in the Early Bronze Age (ca. 2300–1700 BCE) with their approximate ranges. Chequered ovals: Seima-Turbino major sites. Labeled blue ovals: core locations of Uralic branch ancestors: Saa(mi), Fin(nic), M(or)d(vin), Ma(ri), Pe(rmic), Hun(garian), Man(si), Kha(nty), and Sam(oyedic).

The elements of Glazkov material culture are stitched birch bark boat, dishes of birch bark and wood, portable cradles, a sawhorse-like contraption for carrying load on the back, composite bow, short strong spear with a massive long tip, three-component divaricating dress that allows to dry by the fire without having to completely undress. Glazkov material remains included copper knives, bronze fishing hooks, and ceramics.

=== Burials ===
Glazkov burials brought new funeral traditions into the region: the deceased were oriented down the river, instead of previously common geographical direction orientations. The remains were placed in a crouched position, with intentionally broken artifacts, likely to protect the living from the danger presented by a deceased.

To the end of the Glazkov time in the southern portion of the eastern Baikal area, there was an influx of people from Mongolia, who brought a distinctive tradition of stone kurgans with fences (chereksurs), which resulted in the formation of a Slab Grave culture that became the eastern wing of a huge nomadic world in Eurasia, which produced in the beginning of the 1st millennium BCE a civilization known as Scythian-Siberian World.

=== Related cultures ===
Glazkov culture had clearly expressed variations, bringing about a number of hypotheses about ethno-cultural situation in the Baikal area, all of them concurring that all population groups are of the animal husbandry type. These cultures are Daur, Slab Grave Culture, and Palace Type burials, seen by some researchers as the earliest predecessor of the Slab Grave Culture.

== Economy ==
Their economy was mainly based on hunting, fishery and gathering.

== Archaeogenetics ==
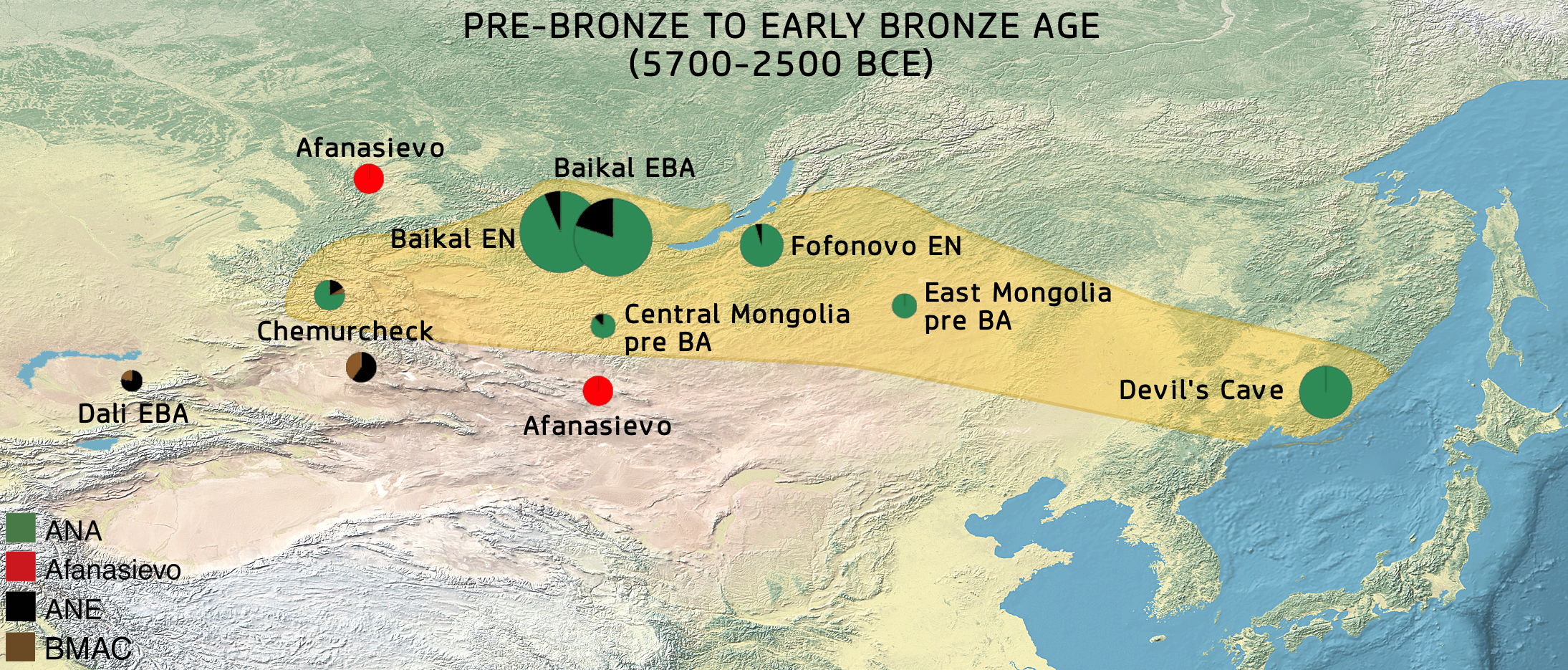
The Glazkovo culture (Baikal EBA) in context with other Ancient Northeast Asian-rich cultures.

=== Haplogroups ===
All 4 tested Early Bronze Age individuals from the Ust-Ida burial site belonged to the Y-DNA haplogroup Q-YP4004 under Q1a2. Two earlier Late Neolithic burials from the same area yielded Y-haplogroups Q1a2 and N1c1.

=== Autosomal DNA ===
The genetic ancestry associated with the Glazkovo culture remains is known as "Baikal Early Bronze Age" (Baikal_EBA) ancestry, and falls into the Ancient Northern East Asian (ANEA) gene pool, with c. 11% (5-20%) admixture from Ancient North Eurasians (ANE). The Glazkovo remains display high genetic affinity with the "Cisbaikal_LNBA" ancestry, possibly associated with ancient Yeniseian speakers. Cisbaikal_LNBA ancestry is inferred to be rich in Ancient Paleo-Siberian ancestry, and also display affinity to Inner Northeast Asian (Yumin-like) groups.

Modern Altaians display genetic affinity to the Glazkovo hunter-gatherer culture, and can be used as possible proxy for the East Eurasian component among Saka (Scytho-Siberian nomads).

== See also ==
- History of Kazakhstan
- History of Kyrgyzstan
- History of Mongolia
- History of Russia
