= Baikalia =

Region around Lake Baikal in Russia

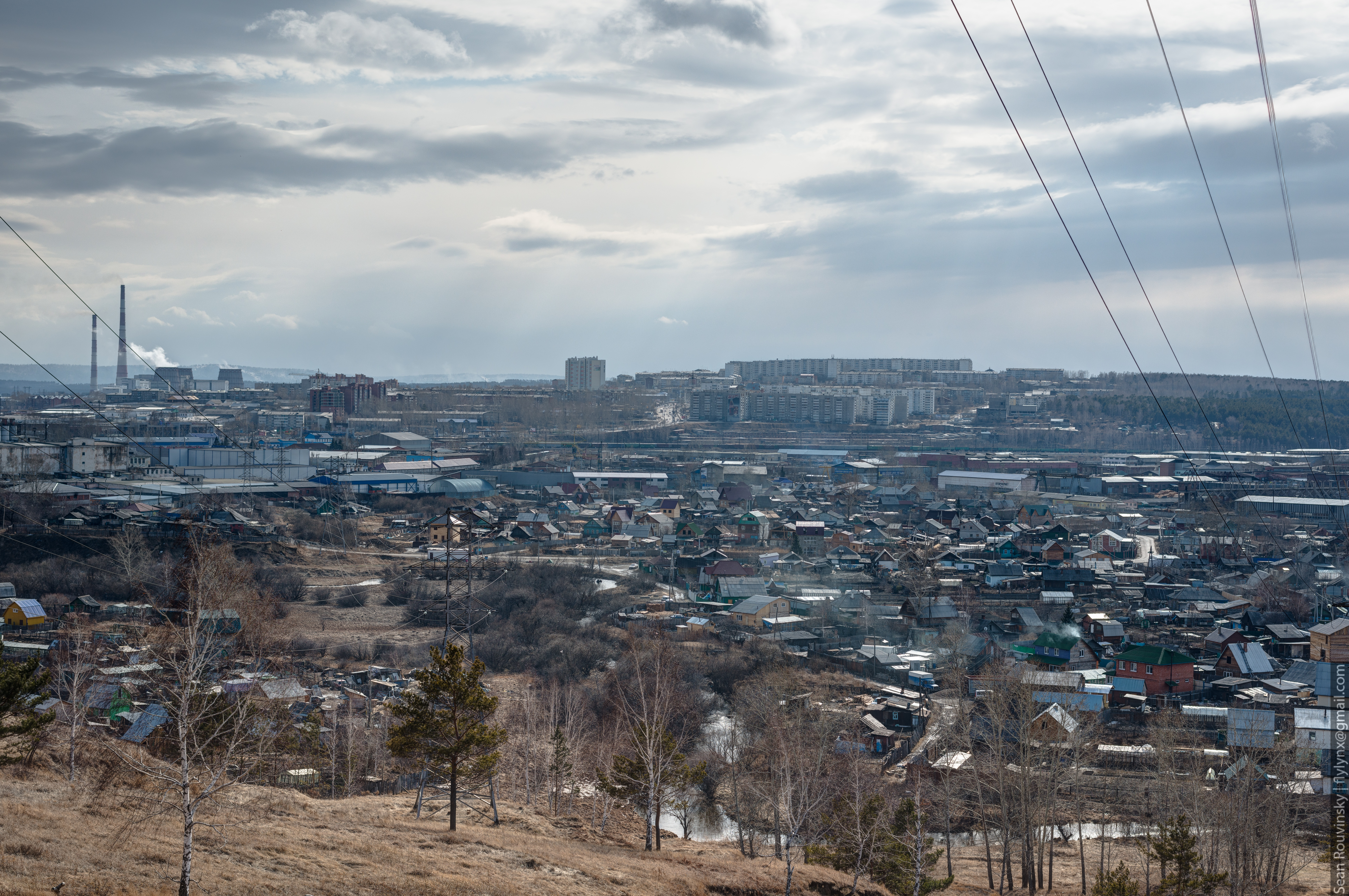
Irkutsk is the biggest city in the region around Lake Baikal

Baikalia (also transcribed as Baykalia. Russian: Прибайкалье, romanized: Pribaykal'ye) is a vague geographical term referring to the region around Lake Baikal. It is less common than the concept of Transbaikalia, the area to the east of Lake Baikal. The term Baikalia is loosely defined and has no official definition.

== History ==
=== Early history ===
The Baikal area has a long history of human habitation. An early, historically known tribe in the area was the Kurykans, partially forefathers of at least two ethnic groups: the Buryats and the Yakuts.

Located in the former northern territory of the Xiongnu confederation, Baikalia was a theatre of the Han–Xiongnu War, where the armies of the Han dynasty pursued and defeated the Xiongnu forces from the 2nd century BC to the 1st century AD. They recorded that the lake was a "huge sea" (hanhai) and designated it the North Sea (Běihǎi) of the semimythical Four Seas. The Kurykans, a Siberian tribe who inhabited the area in the sixth century, gave it a name that translates to "much water". Later on, it was called "natural lake" (Baygal nuur) by the Buryats and "rich lake" (Bay göl) by the Yakuts. Little was known to Europeans about the lake until Russia expanded into the area in the 17th century. The first Russian explorer to reach Lake Baikal was Kurbat Ivanov in 1643.

=== Russian conquest ===
Russian expansion into the Buryat area around Lake Baikal in 1628–58 was part of the Russian conquest of Siberia. It was done first by following the Angara River upstream from Yeniseysk (founded 1619) and later by moving south from the Lena River. Russians first heard of the Buryats in 1609 at Tomsk. According to folktales related a century after the fact, in 1623, Demid Pyanda, who may have been the first Russian to reach the Lena, crossed from the upper Lena to the Angara and arrived at Yeniseysk.

Vikhor Savin (1624) and Maksim Perfilyev (1626 and 1627–28) explored Tungus country on the lower Angara. To the west, Krasnoyarsk on the upper Yenisei was founded in 1627. A number of ill-documented expeditions explored eastward from Krasnoyarsk. In 1628, Pyotr Beketov first encountered a group of Buryats and collected yasak (tribute) from them at the future site of Bratsk. In 1629, Yakov Khripunov set off from Tomsk to find a rumored silver mine. His men soon began plundering both Russians and natives. They were joined by another band of rioters from Krasnoyarsk, but left the Buryat country when they ran short of food. This made it difficult for other Russians to enter the area. In 1631, Maksim Perfilyev built an ostrog at Bratsk. The pacification was moderately successful, but in 1634, Bratsk was destroyed and its garrison killed. In 1635, Bratsk was restored by a punitive expedition under Radukovskii. In 1638, it was besieged unsuccessfully.

In 1638, Perfilyev crossed from the Angara over the Ilim portage to the Lena River and went downstream as far as Olyokminsk. Returning, he sailed up the Vitim River into the area east of Lake Baikal (1640) where he heard reports of the Amur country. In 1641, Verkholensk was founded on the upper Lena. In 1643, Kurbat Ivanov went further up the Lena and became the first Russian to see Lake Baikal and Olkhon Island. Half his party under Skorokhodov remained on the lake, reached the Upper Angara at its northern tip, and wintered on the Barguzin River on the northeast side.

In 1644, Ivan Pokhabov went up the Angara to Baikal, becoming perhaps the first Russian to use this route, which is difficult because of the rapids. He crossed the lake and explored the lower Selenge River. About 1647, he repeated the trip, obtained guides, and visited a 'Tsetsen Khan' near Ulan Bator. In 1648, Ivan Galkin built an ostrog on the Barguzin River which became a center for eastward expansion. In 1652, Vasily Kolesnikov reported from Barguzin that one could reach the Amur country by following the Selenga, Uda, and Khilok Rivers to the future sites of Chita and Nerchinsk. In 1653, Pyotr Beketov took Kolesnikov's route to Lake Irgen west of Chita, and that winter his man Urasov founded Nerchinsk. Next spring, he tried to occupy Nerchensk, but was forced by his men to join Stephanov on the Amur.

=== Modern times ===
The Trans-Siberian Railway was built between 1896 and 1902. Construction of the scenic railway around the southwestern end of Lake Baikal required 200 bridges and 33 tunnels. Until its completion, a train ferry transported railcars across the lake from Port Baikal to Mysovaya for a number of years. The lake became the site of the minor engagement between the Czechoslovak legion and the Red Army in 1918. At times during winter freezes, the lake could be crossed on foot—though at risk of frostbite and deadly hypothermia from the cold wind moving unobstructed across flat expanses of ice. In the winter of 1920, the Great Siberian Ice March occurred, when the retreating White Russian Army crossed frozen Lake Baikal. The wind on the exposed lake was so cold, many people died, freezing in place until spring thaw. Beginning in 1956, the impounding of the Irkutsk Dam on the Angara River raised the level of the lake by 1.4 m (4.6 ft).

Lake Baikal
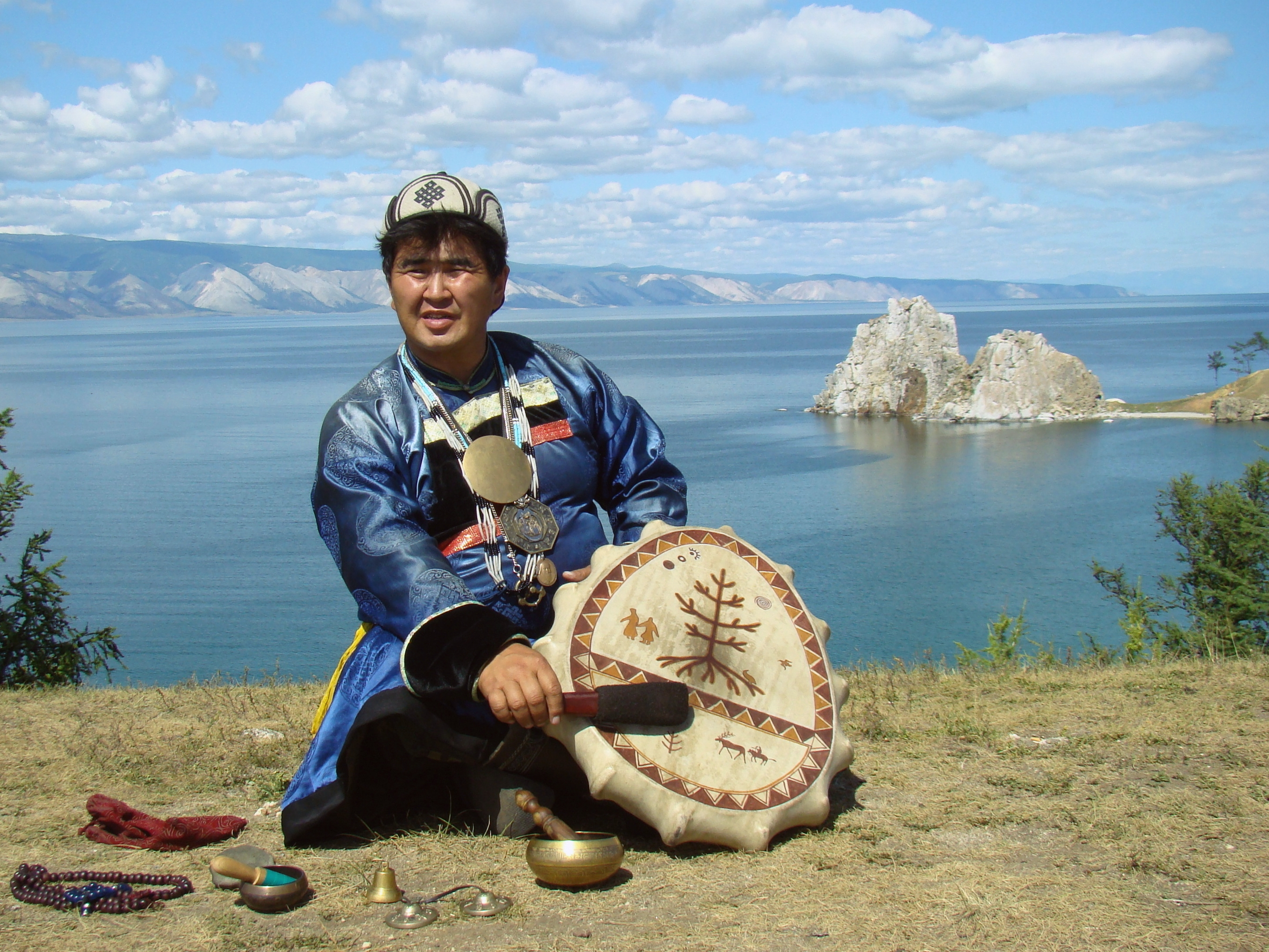
Buryat shaman on Olkhon Island.

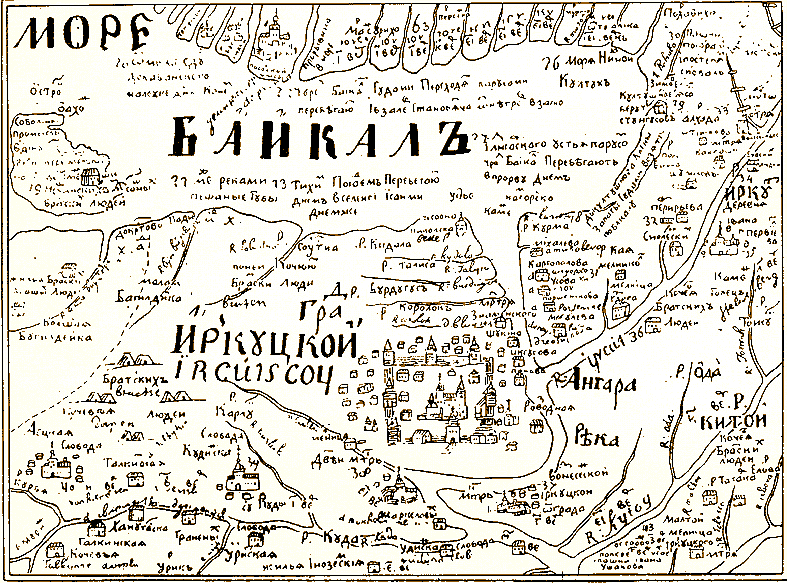
Russian map c. 1700, Baikal (not to scale) is at top.

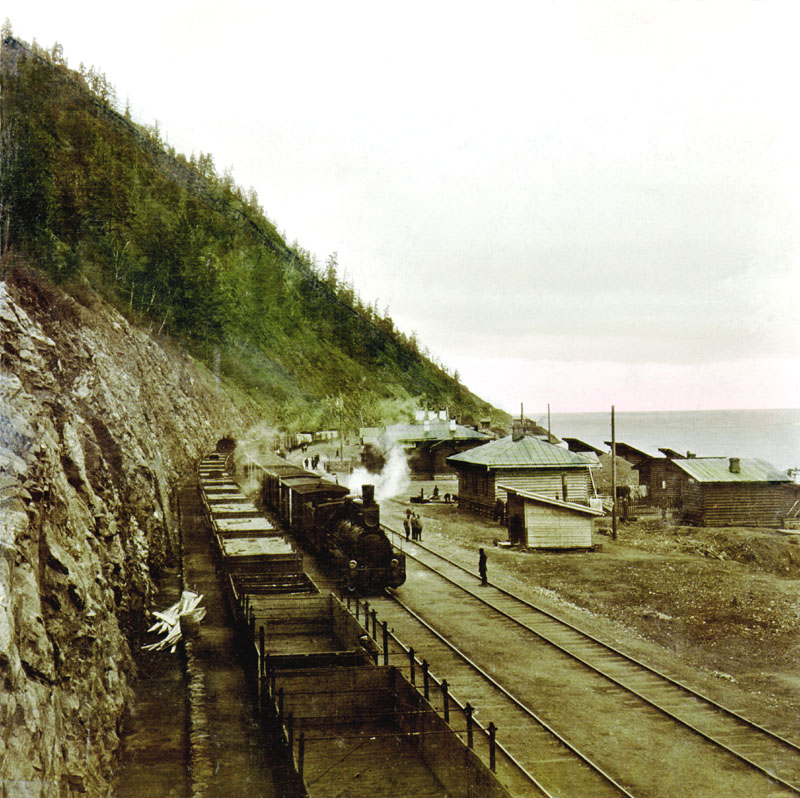
Steam locomotive on the Circum-Baikal Railroad

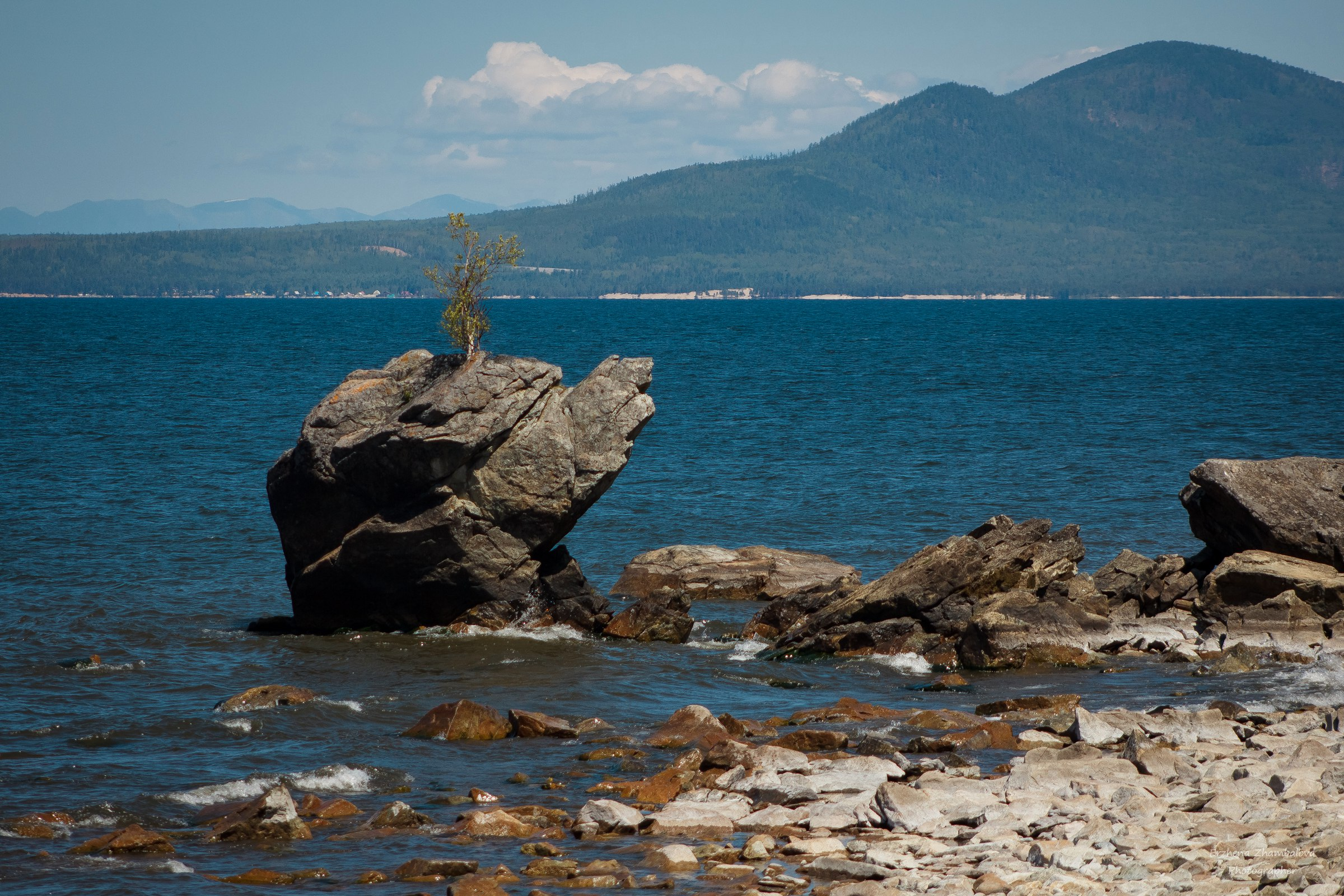
The eastern coast of Lake Baikal
