= Alexey Okladnikov =

Soviet archaeologist and ethnographer (1908–1981)

Alexey Okladnikov Алексей Окладников
- Portrait from the obituary of the Russian Academy of Sciences
- Born: 20 September 1908; Konstantinovka, Irkutsk Governorate, Russian Empire
- Died: 18 November 1981 (aged 73); Novosibirsk, Russian SFSR, Soviet Union
- Known for: Expert in the ancient cultures of Siberia and the Pacific Basin
- Awards: Hero of Socialist Labor (1978)
- Scientific career
- Fields: Archaeologist, historian, and ethnographer
- Institutions: Russian Academy of Sciences, Novosibirsk

Notes
- Full member of the USSR Academy of Sciences: Corresponding member British Academy; Foreign member of Hungarian Academy of Sciences; Foreign member of Mongolian Academy of Sciences

Alexey Pavlovich Okladnikov (Russian: Алексе́й Па́влович Окла́дников; 1908–1981) was a Soviet archaeologist, historian, and ethnographer, an expert in the ancient cultures of Siberia and the Pacific Basin. He was elected a full member of the Academy of Sciences of the USSR in 1968, and awarded the honorary title of the Hero of Socialist Labor in 1978. The childhood of the scientist took place in Biryulka village in Siberia. From 1938 to 1961, Okladnikov worked in the Leningrad Division of the Archeology Institute of the USSR Academy of Sciences.

Since 1961 Head of the Division of Human Research of the Economics Institute, Siberian Division of the USSR Academy of Sciences.

Since 1966 he was the director of the Institute of History, Philology and Philosophy, Siberian Division of the USSR Academy of Sciences.

Since 1962 Professor and Head, Department of History, of Novosibirsk State University.

His works include research on ancient history of Siberia, Far East, Mongolia, and Middle East. He identified numerous cultures of the Paleolithic, Neolithic, Bronze, and Iron Ages in Siberia and the Far East.

A. P. Okladnikov taught field studies in Siberia, the Far East, Central Asia and Mongolia.

In 1971 he supervised excavations at Zashiversk and the relocation of the historic Spaso-Zashiverskaya Church to Novosibirsk, where it is now displayed.

He excavated and studied remnants of Neanderthal culture in Teshik-Tash in Uzbekistan, Paleolithic remnants in Priamurye and Mongolia, as well as petroglyphs on the banks of the Lena River and the Angara River

In 1945 Okladnikov examined the remains of a Russian polar expedition base left in 1617 in the Faddey Islands off the north-eastern coast of the Taymyr Peninsula, where he also made other discoveries.

He is the author of the Summary on the History of Ancient Society and the Ancient Culture of Paleolitic and Neolithic Art, the History of Siberia, the Far East and the Far North.

The museum of Khabarovsk is named the "Okladnikov Museum" in his honour.

== Family ==
Wife — archaeologist and artist V. D. Zaporozhskaya (1910–1985);

Daughter — Elena Alekseevna Okladnikova (b. 1951), ethnographer, professor at Saint Petersburg State University.

== Works ==
- The Soviet Far East in Antiquity: An Archaeological and Historical Study of the Maritime Region of the U.S.S.R. (1965)
- Окладников А.П. и др. "Древний Зашиверск", Москва, 1977
- Okladnikov, Alexei "Art of the Amur : Ancient Art of the Russian Far East", New York, 1982

== See also ==
- Faddey Islands
- South Turkmenistan Complex Archaeological Expedition
