= Circum–Baikal railway =

Railway line in Russia

Circum–Baikal railway map

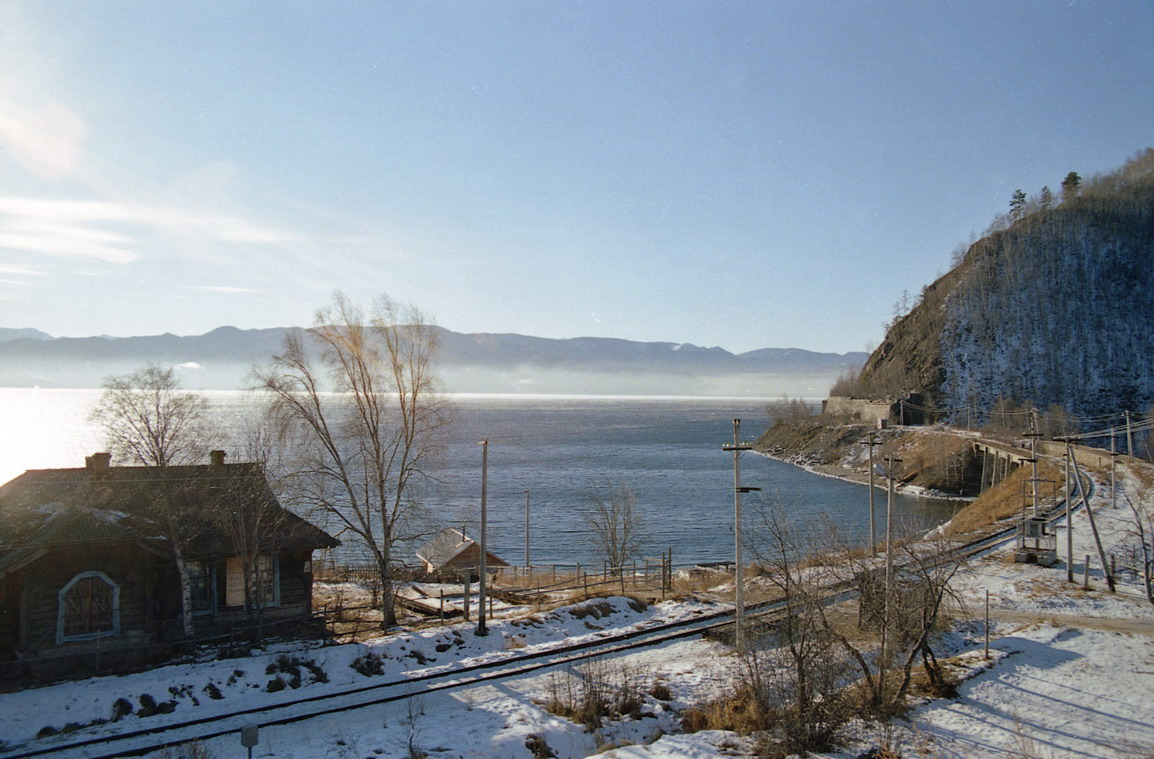
The Circum–Baikal Railway in the winter

The Circum–Baikal railway (Russian: Кругобайка́льская желе́зная доро́га or Кругобайка́лка, abbreviated "КБЖД") is a historical railway in the Irkutsk region of Russia. It runs along the Northern shore of the Southern extremity of Lake Baikal from the town of Slyudyanka to the Baikal settlement. Until the middle of the 20th century the Circum–Baikal railway was part of the main line of Trans–Siberian Railway; later on, however, a duplicate section of the railway was built. Sometimes called a unique achievement in engineering, the Circum–Baikal is one of the picturesque sights of the area around Lake Baikal.

== History ==
When the Siberian railway, later called the "Trans–Siberian Railway" was being designed, it was divided into seven sections. Circum–Baikal railway was one of these, being the section from Irkutsk to Mysovaya wharf (now the town of Babushkin) on the South-Eastern shore of Lake Baikal.

=== Survey work ===
The first survey of a possible route for the first section of the Circum–Baikal, from Irkutsk to Lake Baikal, was carried out in 1894. Initially, the surveyors proposed to build a pontoon bridge and have the railway go down the right (east) bank of the Angara River (the left bank was too built up); however, later this variant was found to be inexpedient, as the level of water in the Angara was subject to fluctuations, and during spring thaws, crossing the river would have been difficult. Therefore, the planners decided to establish the railway from Irkutsk along the left bank.

The construction of the railway along the Angara from Irkutsk to Cape Baranchik (Port Baikal) on Lake Baikal was carried out in 1896–1900, at a total cost of 3.47 million rubles. In the meantime, East of the lake the railway from Sretensk was completed up to Mysovaya on the east shore of Lake Baikal. With the purpose of establishing a through railway connection, before the Circum-Baikal was finished, it was decided to link the shores of the lake with a train ferry. Trains were carried on the special ice breaker-ferry SS Baikal which had three parallel tracks on its train deck. Another, smaller icebreaker-ferry, the "Angara", was also built which carried passengers and goods, but not trains. In the cold winter of 1903/04 when the icebreakers were not strong enough to break the ice, a railway line was laid on the ice, and railway wagons were pulled by draft animals.

Meanwhile, the construction of another section of track, intended to fill the gap in the Trans–Siberian Railway, was carried out. The routing of its eastern section, from Mysovaya to Kultuk (at the lake's southwestern tip), passing along the flat southern coast of the lake, did not cause difficulties. The greatest complexities were encountered on the western section, meant to connect Irkutsk and Kultuk. A group of researchers under the direction of the professor Ivan Vasilʹevich Mushketov studied four options for routing this section of the railway:

- from Irkutsk along the left bank of the Irkut River across the Zyrkuzunsky ridge to Kultuk
- from Irkutsk through the valleys of the Greater Olkha and the Krutaya Guba Rivers and then along the coast of Lake Baikal up to the Kultuk settlement
- from the Baikal station to Kultuk along the lake shore
- from Belektui village (located on the Trans-Siberian railway to the west of Irkutsk) across the Tunkinsky ridge to Kultuk

According to the results of the work of mountain engineering parties, on June 29, 1889, the Committee for the Construction of the Siberian Railway chose the first and third options from these four initial proposals. From 1899 to 1900 final survey work was done, and the engineers preferred to lay the line along the lake shore (i.e., the third option). Despite the difficult terrain along the shoreline, which consisted of a rocky ridge with abrupt slopes, towering 270 to 400 m above the shore, calculations showed this option to be the most economical.

The final decision on the line was made by the Committee for the Construction of the Siberian Railway on 22 June [O.S. 9 June] 1901. The cost of construction of the stated section of the line was 52.52 million rubles. The transportation engineer Boleslav Cavrimovich was appointed as director of construction.

=== Construction of the railway ===
The construction of the Circum–Baikal railway began in late 1899. Originally the efforts of the builders were concentrated on the section from Mysovaya to Tankhoy. Beginning in 1901, the section from Tankhoy to Slyudyanka was laid. The construction of these sections was carried out chiefly by the inmates and hard labourers of the Aleksandrovsky prison.

Workers began construction on the most complex section, from Slyudyanka to the Baikal station, only in the spring of 1902, with the aim of finishing it by 1905. The original plan required the construction of 33 tunnels, at a cost of 5.3 million rubles, a retaining wall for 3.7 million rubles, and viaducts for 1.6 million rubles. With regard to the possible negative impact caused by the lake water, the minimum necessary height of the track route over the water of Baikal was calculated to be 2.5 sazhens (5.33 m). Technical conditions during the arrangement of the double-track sections fixed the capacity of the line at 14 pairs of trains per day.

Owing to the lack of a flat shoreline all the materials (with the exception of stone mined at the site) were brought by water to the site of construction (by barge during the summer, by animal-drawn carts in the winter). The complex terrain of the rocky shore compelled the builders to lay the majority of the route in tunnels or on artificial platforms cut out of the rock; the sides of the railway were strengthened with retaining walls. The workers, already suffering under the hot summers and harsh winters, were required to carry out the majority of the construction by manual labour.

Every kilometer of the line required the expenditure of about one wagon of explosives. Earthwork was carried out in volume, approximately equal to 400 wagons. Embankments amounted to 28.7% of the length of the road, and cuttings to 71.3% (with a great deal in rocky soil). The construction of the railway track itself had to be made heavier, using stronger, heavier track and increasing the number of ties. Because of the difficult terrain the minimum radius of the turns was reduced.

The onset of the Russo-Japanese War in 1904 caused an acceleration in the construction of the railway. From 1901 to 1902 about 9,000 workers were employed on the railway, while in 1903–1904 the number rose to 13,500. The main efforts were focused on the construction of the railway line itself; therefore, the development work of stations and towns in the path of the line did not take place. Works trains began to run on the railway on 1 October [O.S. 18 September] 1904 and on 29 October [O.S. 16 October] 1905 the line was brought into permanent operation. The length of the railway in its final form from Baikal station to Mysovaya was 244 versts (260 km). The aggregate value of one kilometer of the Circum–Baikal railway was about 130 thousand rubles (compared to 93 thousand rubles on the other sections of the Trans–Siberian Railway).

=== Active operation ===
When the Circum–Baikal railway was put into operation, the Trans–Siberian railway on either side of Baikal was linked and began to be used to transport goods and passengers. The Circum–Baikal was called the "golden buckle on the steel belt of Russia".

Initially, only one track was built; from 1911 to 1914 the construction of a second track was undertaken, which increased the capacity of the Circum–Baikal to 48 pairs of trains a day. In this stage of the construction of bridges and other engineering structures reinforced concrete was introduced as new material. As part of these works, considerable attention was paid to the construction of stations and station towns. On the section from Baikal to Slyudyanka alone ten stopping points were set up. Measures were taken to improve traffic safety and protect against landslides.

During the revolutionary events of 1917 and the subsequent civil war the Circum-Baikal was the scene of intense fighting, as evidenced by the mass graves of victims of those events. The Red Army, retreating from the Czechoslovak Legions, blew up the Kirkidaysky tunnel (No. 39, past Slyudyanka on the way to Mysovaya) on July 23, 1918. The tunnel was later restored, but there was no movement on the line for almost 20 days.

In the 1930s, 40s, and 50s, the villages were actively developed, and homes, barracks for the troops, and power plants were built.

=== Decline ===
In 1940, exploration work was initiated to strengthen the track and ensure the safety of traffic on the Circum–Baikal Railway. Owing to the start of the Second World War, the work was completed only by 1947. The group in charge of development came to an unexpected conclusion and, citing the enormous cost, proposed not to carry out any work on the railway alongside Lake Baikal. Instead, they proposed to transform the single track from Irkutsk to Slyudyanka across the mountains into an electric double track.

From 1947 to 1949 an electric transfer railway from Irkutsk via Bolshoy Lug to Slyudyanka was built, noticeably shortening the distance compared with the Circum–Baikal branch line. The main route of the Trans–Siberian Railway was therefore transferred to the new section.

In 1950, construction on the Irkutsk Hydroelectric Power Station plant was begun. In connection with this, the part of the Circum–Baikal railway from Irkutsk to the town of Baikal that passed along the Angara River was disassembled and in 1956 flooded during the filling of the Irkutsk reservoir (only remnants of dams remained on the shore of the Angara near the town of Baikal). In the end, only a "dead-end" route of the Circum–Baikal (from Slyudyanka-2 to Kultuk, Marituy, and Baykal) was left. The railway lost its strategic importance, the number of trains on the road dropped sharply, and security was withdrawn from the tunnels and bridges.

Because it was no longer needed, the second track of the Circum–Baikal line was dismantled. In the early 1980s, some even proposed the closure of the line, or that a road be constructed in its place. The villages along the road gradually deteriorated, and people began to abandon their houses. Virtually the only means of communication with the heartland for the residents of these places was the rarely running diesel locomotive, and later a locomotive connected Slyudyanka, Kultuk, and Baykal (Port Baikal is linked to the village of Listvyanka on the opposite shore of the Angara by an automobile ferry).

== Landslides and other natural phenomena on the Circum–Baikal ==
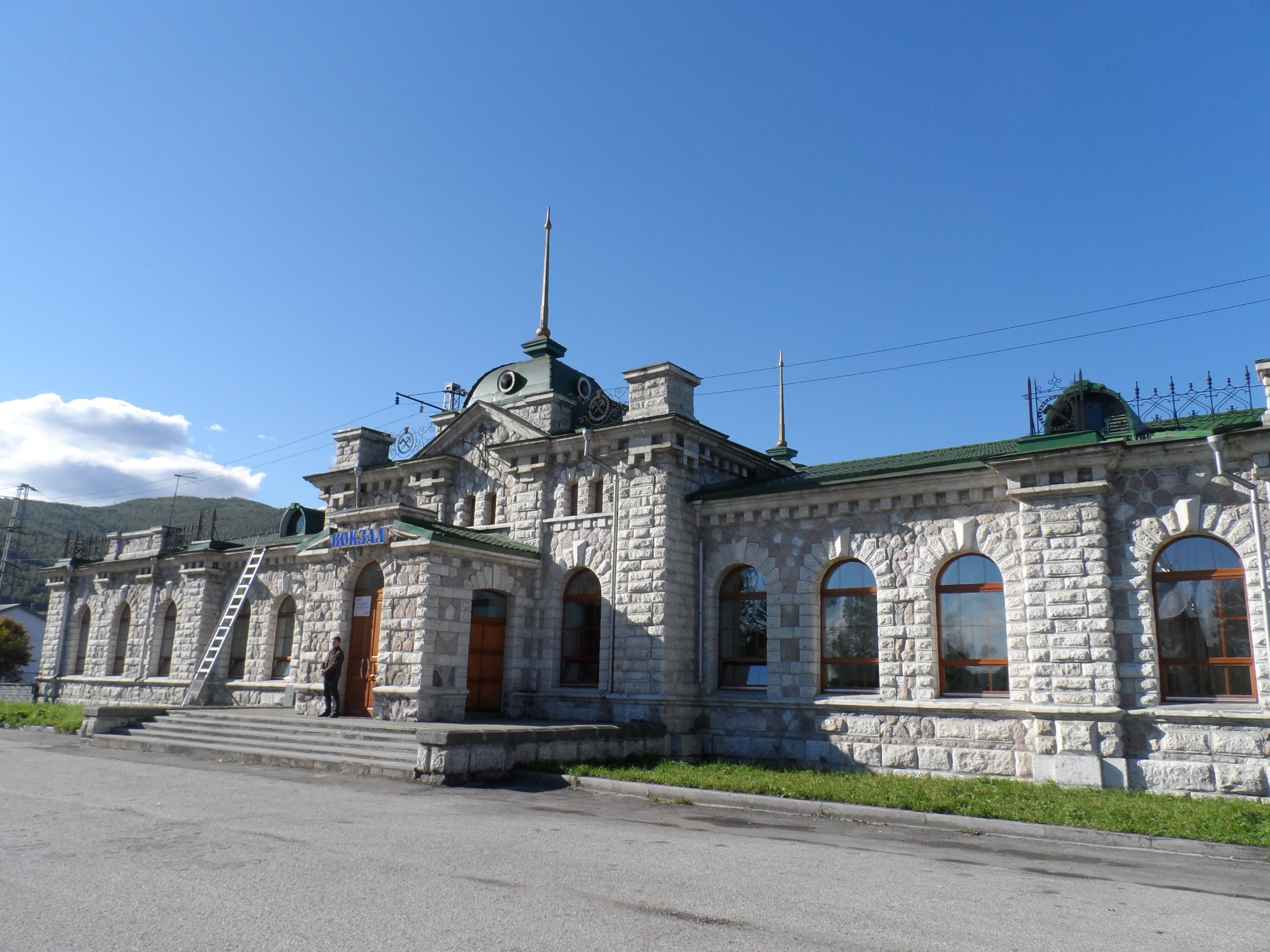
Slyudyanka station

The greatest challenge for the Circum–Baikal Railway was and still is frequent landslides and mud flows. Even at the time of surveying, engineers noted a strong weathering of the rock layers and a large amount of scree. The demolition of the hillside and the steep slopes during the construction of the trackbed provoked a catastrophic intensification of geodynamic processes. Severe landslides occurred during the construction of roads, in particular at Tunnel 5 in April 1904 a collapse of about 3000 m^{3} occurred, and a month before the end of the construction a collapse occurred in Tunnel 9 of about 1000 m^{3}, damaging the masonry of the tunnel.

The results of further studies of the rocks along the way showed that they were not as robust as the initial surveys had expected. Moreover, the work associated with the construction of the railway (particularly the work using explosives) had led to the formation of numerous cracks in the rocks below. Having recognised this danger, the authorities agreed on the construction of retaining walls, the stripping of the hillside, and other measures. In some places dangerous sections were rerouted with new tunnels.

Nevertheless, in spite of the work to prevent natural hazards, landslides were a frequent and dangerous phenomenon on the Circum-Baikal, often leading to crashes and interruptions in traffic. For example:

- In early April 1913, a 4000 m^{3} landslide occurred on the Irkutsk side at Tunnel 16. As a result, the movement of trains was suspended for ten days.
- In April 1929, owing to an earthquake there was a shift in the rock mass at the 143 km mark, which then collapsed from a height of 200 m. The rocks broke the retaining wall and damaged both tracks (some pieces were as much as 30 m^{3} in size; they were removed through detonation). The delay in traffic as a result of the collapse was 12 hours.
- In 1937, a piece of rock about 4 m in diameter fell on a train car, broke through the roof and the floor, and caused a train crash.

In 1936, the Marituiskaya section was built for safety purposes. It was one of the most complicated sections of railway in the country. In 1939 on the Western Siberian Railway the Travelling Machine Station was built, which was carried out by anti-landslide workers (including even rock-climbers). The levelling and clearing of dangerous slopes has continued to the present day.

- In May 1941 at the 87 km mark of the railway, an 8 m^{3} block, having broken off from a height of 30 metres, dislodged a moving train together with a steam locomotive into the lake. This boulder, which has become a popular sight, still today holds down some parts of the rolling stock.
- On September 27, 1948, at the 104 mark, a slope collapsed (100 m in length and 35 metres in height), with a general volume of about 20,000 m^{3}. As a result, traffic stopped for four days.
- In 1982, a collapse of 900 m^{3} occurred, stopping traffic for a week.
- In 1991, a collapse of about 700 m^{3} closed off the entrance to a tunnel at the 140 mark.

Among other natural phenomena, mudflows and floods have had a negative influence on Circum–Baikal traffic safety. The greatest activity in this respect has occurred on the river Slyudyanka, which runs into Baikal near station 1. On July 29, 1934, a mudflow on this river had catastrophic consequences, carrying off in its wake several apartment houses and covering the station with a thick layer of silt and sand. In 1960 a mudflow on the Slyudyanka again washed away train tracks and destroyed a series of dams. Powerful downpours in 1971 caused the most severe floods, which led to the destruction of several bridges and tunnel entrances, as well as the foundations of a track on the Circum-Baikal (the interruption of traffic lasted almost a week). Another unusual natural phenomenon occurs on the south side of Baikal: the deposition of ice sometimes causes a several-metre heap of ice blocks on the coast, covering the railways with ice.

In 16 years alone, from 1932 to 1947, 721 collapses occurred, of which 502 were without consequences for the railway, 201 closed off a single stage and disturbed the top structure of the railway, and 18 caused train wrecks and the destruction of the embankment. According to the data of the Eastern Siberian Engineering Service, between 1930 and 1984 about 1200 collapses and mud-flows were recorded. Besides this, about 500 cases of the falling of individual rocks caused damage to the railway and rolling stock. Engineers described trips on the Circum-Baikal as exciting but dangerous.

== Current condition ==
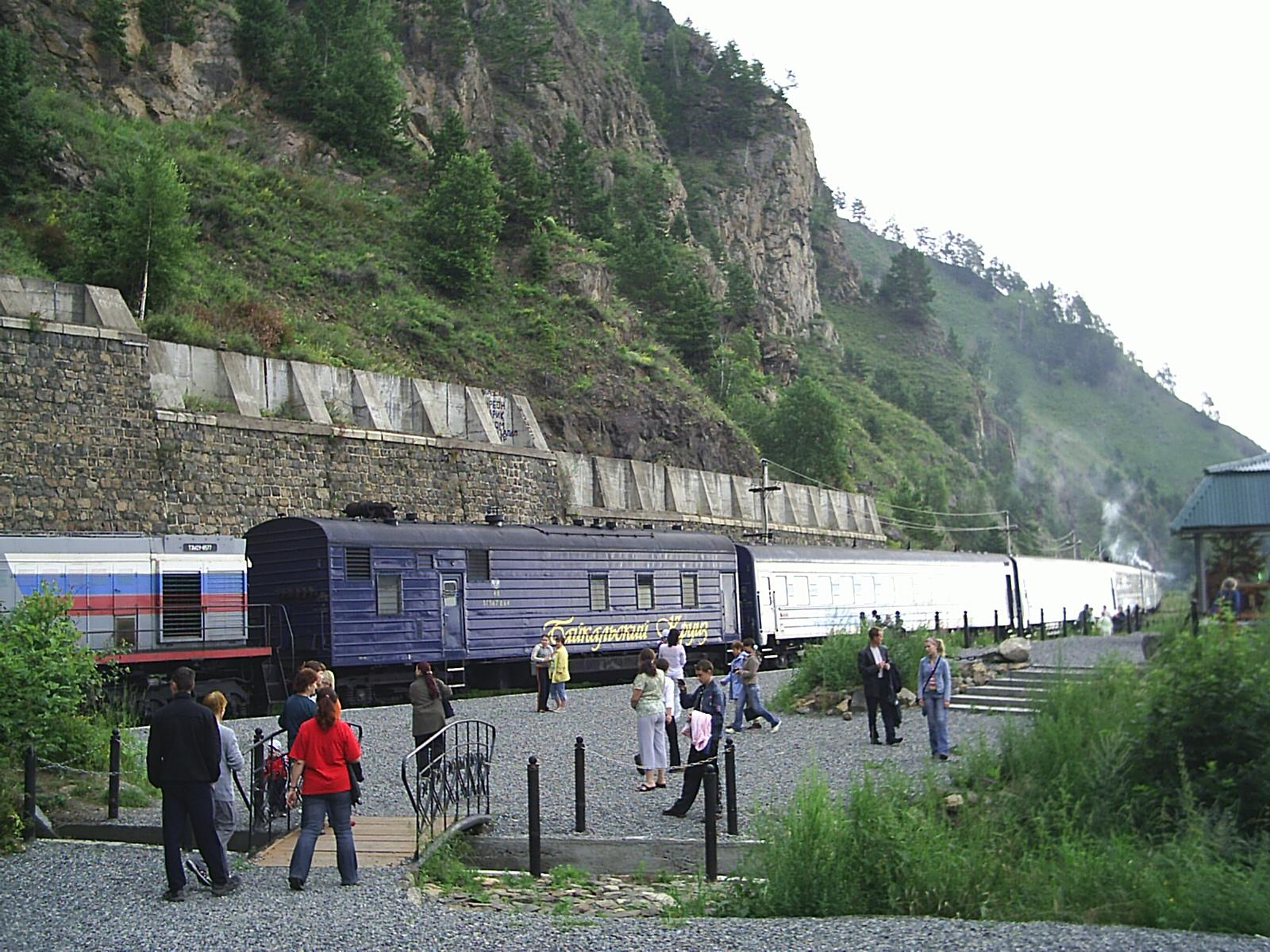
Excursion train "Baikal cruise" in Kirkirey

At the present time, the Circum–Baikal Railway is the name of an 89-km–long branch covering the route Slyudyanka-2–Kultuk–Maritui–Baikal. Four stations are currently in operation: Kultuk, Maritui, Ulanovo, and Baikal, with one section of double track at 137 km. The Circum–Baikal contains thirty-eight tunnels with a total length of 9063 m (the longest of them, a tunnel through cape Polovinnyj, is 777.5 m long). There are also 15 stone galleries with a total length of 295 m and 3 ferro-concrete galleries with apertures, 248 bridges and viaducts, and 268 retaining walls. The Circum–Baikal has no equal in Russia as to the richness of engineering constructions. The tunnels and stone galleries of the Circum–Baikal are unique in that they were constructed atypically and have not been reconstructed since, conserving the initial plan of architects and engineers of the beginning of the century.

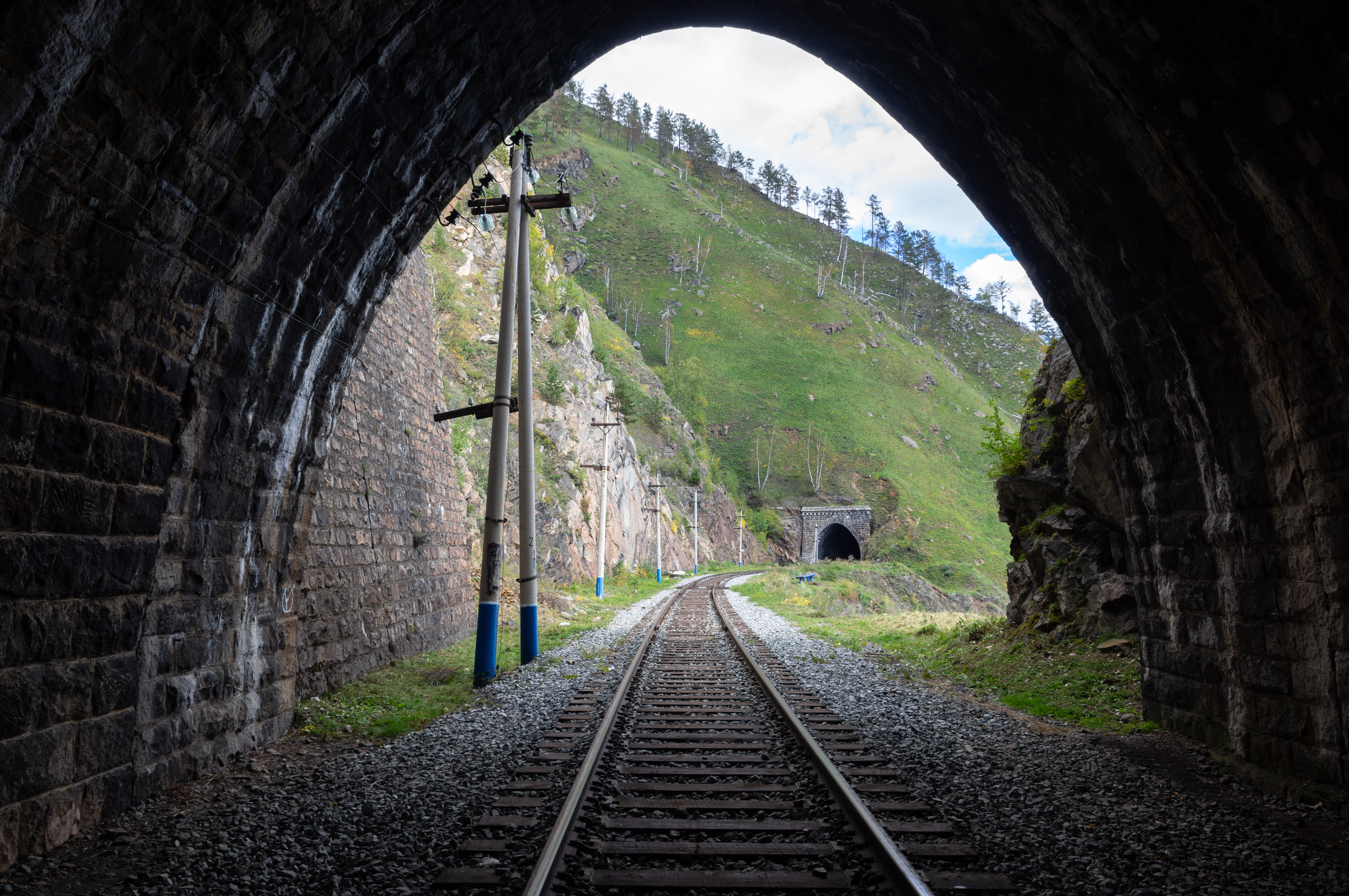
Tunnels on the Circum–Baikal Railway

Kilometers on the modern Circum–Baikal are traditionally measured from the Irkutsk exchange station, which until 1934 was the administrative border between the Tomsk railway and the Transbaikal Railway. The Baikal station is thus located 72 km from this datum point, and the Slyudyanka-2 station, at 161 km.

In the 1980s and 1990s, measures were begun to reconstruct and strengthen the railway. Currently, normally one train a day (a diesel locomotive and two cars) runs on the railway. The duration of the trip from Slyudyanka to the Baikal station is four hours and forty minutes. The inhabitants of the trackside settlements call the train a передача, or "transfer", reflecting the value of this transport for the supply of necessary articles such as bread, salt, matches, vodka, and tobacco. Another name given to the train is мотаня (so called because the train rushes or мотается between stations). In addition, tourist trains periodically pass along the Cicum-Baikal, including steam locomotives and retro-style cars. Tourists can also rent handcars.

By a decision of the Irkutsk regional council on December 21, 1982, the section of the Circum–Baikal from Baikal station to Kultuk station was declared an architectural and scenic reserve (it is now part of the Baikal National Park) and put under State protection. Beginning in the early 1980s the tourist potential of the Circum–Baikal Railway began to come into its own (the stations, however, were used to a limited degree since the railroad's inception as an area for dachas and recreation). A series of tourist areas are in operation ("Taiga" at 134 km, "Sensation" at 102 km, "Coniferous" at 98 km, "Retro" and the "Silver Key" at 80 km.

Along with actual railway sights, tourists on the Circum–Baikal route are attracted by the numerous nature reserves, including the rocky formations such as "Белая выемка". In the settlements along the Circum–Baikal, especially in Maritui, a number of early twentieth-century items in the modernist style are preserved.

The following establishments are also located on the Circum–Baikal:

- at 80 km: a research experimental base, the Center for Preservation of Historical and Cultural Heritage
- at 106 km: the base of a nuclear research institute
- at 119–120 km (Maritui): a research area for students of the Biological and Soil Studies Department of the Irkutsk State University

The 100th anniversary of the railway was celebrated in the autumn of 2005. For this event the Baikal station was reconstructed, in which an exhibit was opened, devoted to the Circum–Baikal. The Sludyanka station was also rebuilt.

=== List of stations and stops ===
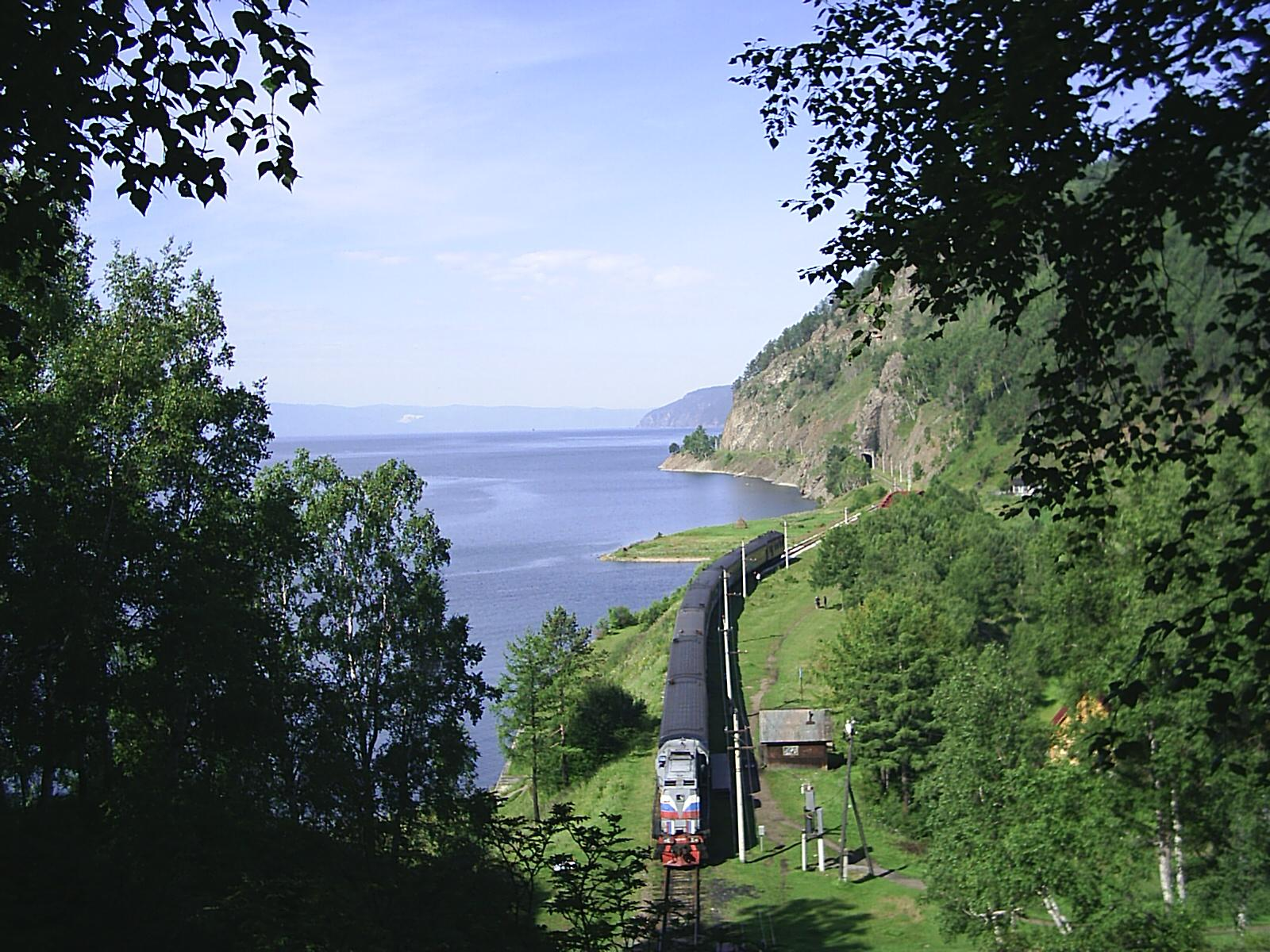
Tourist train in Polovinny

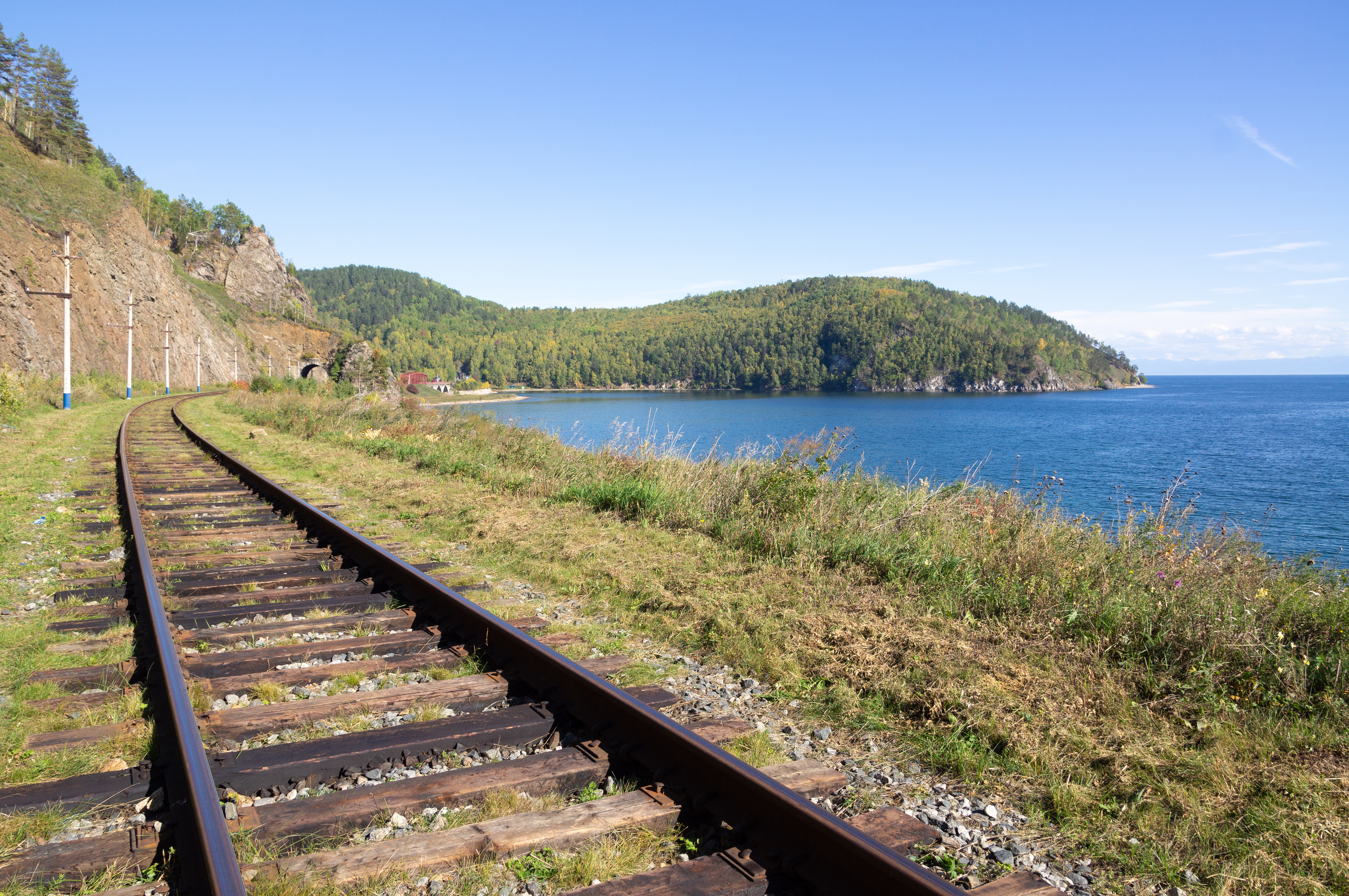
Lake shore in Polovinny

Distance (km)	Name	Location
159	159 km stop	Kultuk
156	Kultuk station	Kultuk
154	154 km stop	154 km settlement
149	149 km stop	Angasolsky village
139	139 km stop	Sharyzhalgai village
138	Sharyzhalgai stop	Lokomotiv Voluntary Sports Society
137	137 km stop	VSZhD Rest stop
134	134 km stop	134 km village
129	129 km stop	Baklan village
120	120 km stop	Maritui settlement
119	Maritui station	Maritui settlement
110	110 km stop	Poloviny village
107	107 km stop	Ponomareva settlement
106	106 km	Ivanovka settlement
102	102 km stop	Shumikha village
98	Ulanovo station	Khvoiny Tourist Center
80	80 km stop	"Retro" Tourist Center
80	79 km stop	"Silver Key" Tourist Center
74	74 km stop	Baikal settlement
72	Baikal station	Baikal settlement

== Depictions ==
- The construction of the Circum–Baikal Railway is described in Baikal: A Sacred Sea (1989) by the Siberian writer Kim Balkov
- The Circum–Baikal Railway is praised in a poem by the Irkutsk poet Yuri Levitansky, "И вот расступаются горы" ("Here the mountains part")
- The Trans–Siberian Railway, including the Circum–Baikal section, has been depicted by a number of painters, including Vladimir Tomilovsky, and by photographers such as Igor Berzhinsky and Galina Korobova.

== Bibliography ==
- Aleksandrov, N. A. Кругобайкальская железная дорога // Железнодорожный транспорт., 1991, No. 5.
- Восточно-Сибирская магистраль. Путь в 100 лет., Irkutsk, 1998.
- Khobta, A. B. КБЖД — памятник инженерного искусства и уникального ландшафта // Земля Иркутская., 2002, No. 2.
