= Baykalsk =

Baykalsk Байкальск
- Town
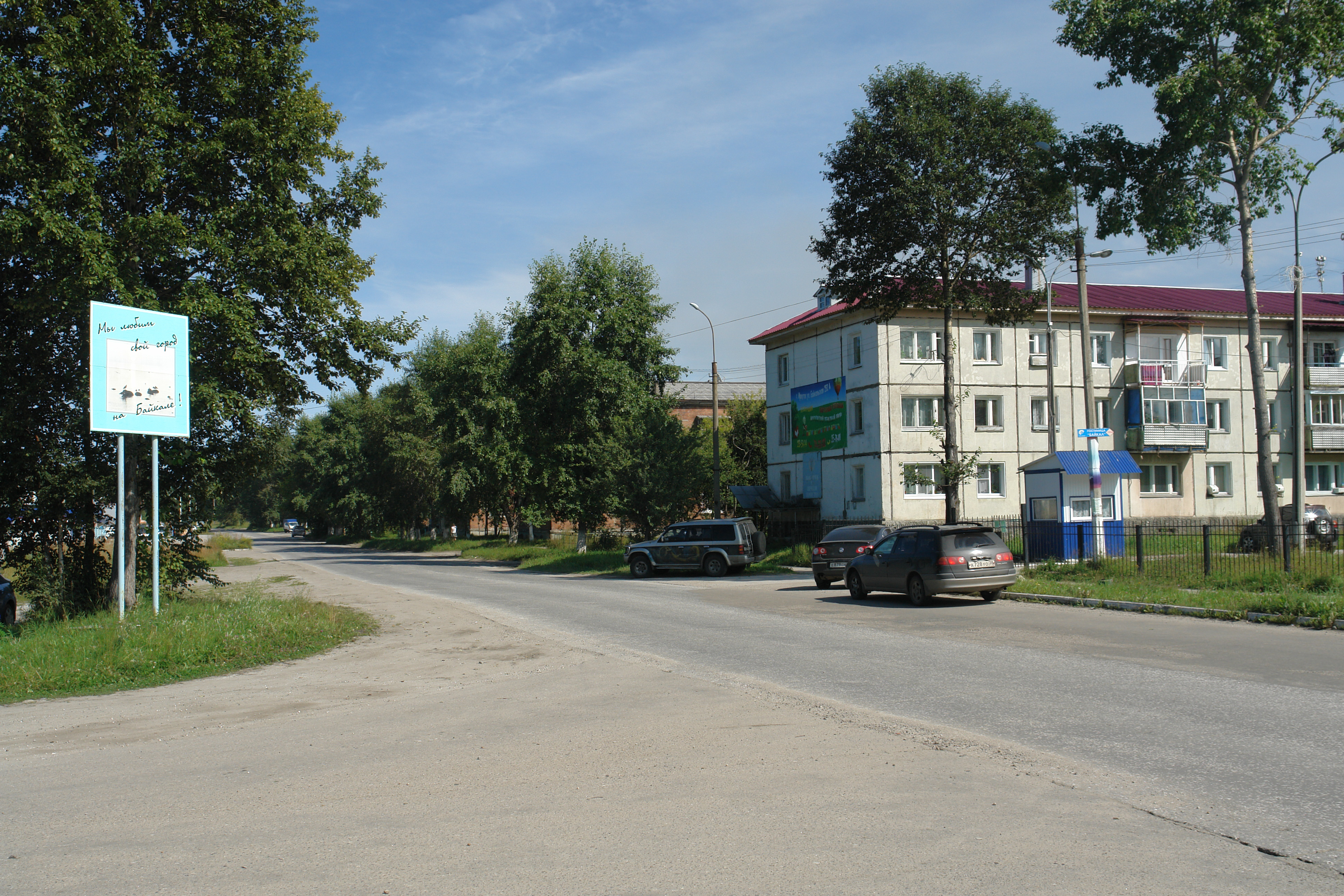
- In Baykalsk

- Flag
- Interactive map of Baykalsk
- Location of Baykalsk Baykalsk (Irkutsk Oblast)
- Coordinates: 51°31′N 104°08′E
- Country: Russia
- Federal subject: Irkutsk Oblast
- Administrative district: Slyudyansky District
- Founded: 1961
- Town status since: 1966
- Elevation: 460 m (1,510 ft)

Population (2010 Census)
  - Total: 13,583
  - Estimate (2021): 13,199 (−2.8%)

Municipal status
  - Municipal district: Slyudyansky Municipal District
  - Urban settlement: Baykalskoye Urban Settlement
  - Capital of: Baykalskoye Urban Settlement
- Time zone: UTC+8 (MSK+5)
- Postal codes: 665930, 665932
- Dialing code: +7 39542
- OKTMO ID: 25634108001

Baykalsk (Russian: Байкальск, IPA: [bɐjˈkalʲsk]) is a town in Slyudyansky District of Irkutsk Oblast, Russia, located 35 kilometers (22 mi) from Slyudyanka, the administrative center of the district. Population: 13,583 (2010 census); 15,727 (2002 census); 16,406 (1989 Soviet census).

== History ==
Baykalsk was founded in 1961 concomitant with the building of a paper mill there, called Baykalsk Paper and Pulp Mills. In 1966 the mill became operational, and the settlement received "city" status. At its peak, the mill employed about 3,500 people.

In the late 2000s, Baykalsk faced a series of well-documented economic crises stemming from its status as a monotown entirely dependent on the declining and then closed paper mill.

== Administrative and municipal status ==
Within the framework of administrative divisions, Baykalsk is subordinated to Slyudyansky District. As a municipal division, the town of Baykalsk, together with two rural localities in Slyudyansky District, is incorporated within Slyudyansky Municipal District as Baykalskoye Urban Settlement.

== Economy ==
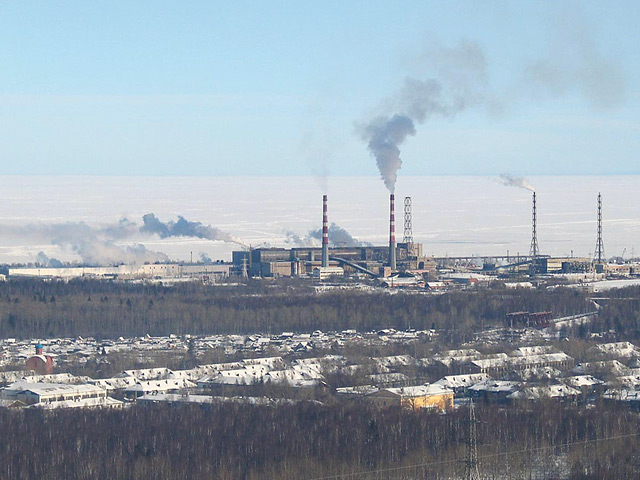
Baykalsk Paper Mill

Baykalsk Paper and Pulp Mills was a major source of pollution of Lake Baikal. About 3,500 people were directly employed by the plant. The plant was closed in 2009 after new expensive waste water treatment equipment made the factory unprofitable after the global economic downturn. In Soviet times, the factory management was primarily responsible for the town's maintenance. The town and plant administrations were independent from one another but 95% of the town's budget used to come from the plant in the form of taxes. In January 2010, following disturbances, the Russian government with the cooperation of its private owner reopened the factory and exempted it from pollution rules but lowered the workers' wages. In September 2013, the mill underwent a final bankruptcy, with the last eight hundred workers slated to lose their jobs by December 28, 2013.

== Infrastructure ==
There are nine kindergartens, three theaters, and a new sports center in the town. The residential parts mostly consist of three- and five-story apartment blocks due to high risk of an earthquake in the town.

== Sister cities ==
South Lake Tahoe (California, USA)
