= Slyudyansky =

Slyudyansky (masculine), Slyudyanskaya (feminine), or Slyudyanskoye (neuter) may refer to:

- Slyudyansky District, a district of Irkutsk Oblast, Russia
- Slyudyanskoye Urban Settlement, a municipal formation which the town of Slyudyanka and two rural localities in Slyudyansky District of Irkutsk Oblast, Russia are incorporated as
