= SS Baikal =

Ice-breaking train ferry

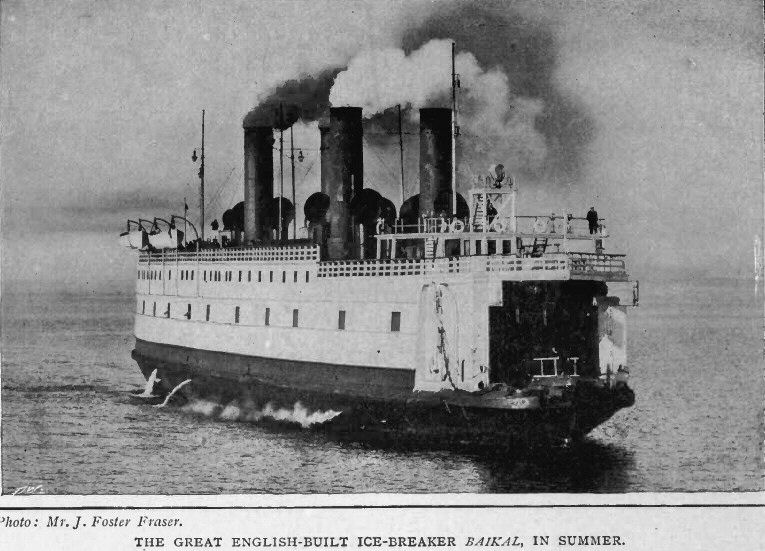
- The icebreaking steamer Baikal in action on Lake Baikal.

History

Russia
- Name: SS Baikal
- Owner: Part of the Trans-Siberian Railroad
- Ordered: 11 January [O.S. 30 December] 1896
- Builder: Armstrong Whitworth, Newcastle-upon-Tyne, England
- Cost: £79,890
- Yard number: 647
- Laid down: Spring 1896
- Launched: 29 June 1899
- Completed: 29 June [O.S. 17 June] 1899
- In service: 1900
- Fate: Damaged by artillery fire in 1918 and scuttled, later dismantled

General characteristics
- Class & type: Train ferry/icebreaker
- Tonnage: 800 GRT
- Displacement: 4,200 long tons (4,267 t)
- Length: 88.4 m (290 ft 0 in)
- Beam: 17.4 m (57 ft 1 in)
- Draught: 5.8 m (19 ft 0 in)
- Installed power: 3 × reciprocating steam engines, 3,750 hp (2,796 kW)
- Propulsion: Two aft wing propellers and one bow propeller
- Speed: 12 knots (22 km/h; 14 mph)
- Capacity: 300 passengers and crew; 27 freight biaxial railway cars

SS Baikal was an ice-breaking train ferry that linked the eastern and western portions of the Trans-Siberian Railroad across Lake Baikal.

== Ship history ==
In early 1895 the construction of a ferry across the Lake Baikal began, following the proposal of the Minister of Transport Mikhail Khilkov. On 30 December 1895 a contract with Sir W G Armstrong Whitworth & Co Ltd in Newcastle upon Tyne was signed for the parts of the icebreaking ferry (without woodwork and in disassembled state). Transport involved sending 7,000 crates with the disassembled from the UK to St Petersburg and then onward for assembly. The boilers, at some 20 tonnes were said to particularly challenging to transport and other parts of the ship went missing or were stolen during transport so had to be replaced. By June 1896 the icebreaker had been delivered for assembly to the village of Listvenichnoye. After three years it was completed and launched on 29 June [O.S. 17 June] 1899.

Before the Circum-Baikal Railway was opened in 1905, Baikal, and later also the Angara, carried two loads a day between piers at Baikal and Mysovaya. After the railway was completed, both ships continued to operate in reserve.

When the Russian Civil War broke out Baikal was equipped with machine guns and cannons by the Bolsheviks. When Irkutsk surrendered to the White Army, Baikal sailed to the Mysovaya pier, the location of the Red Army headquarters.

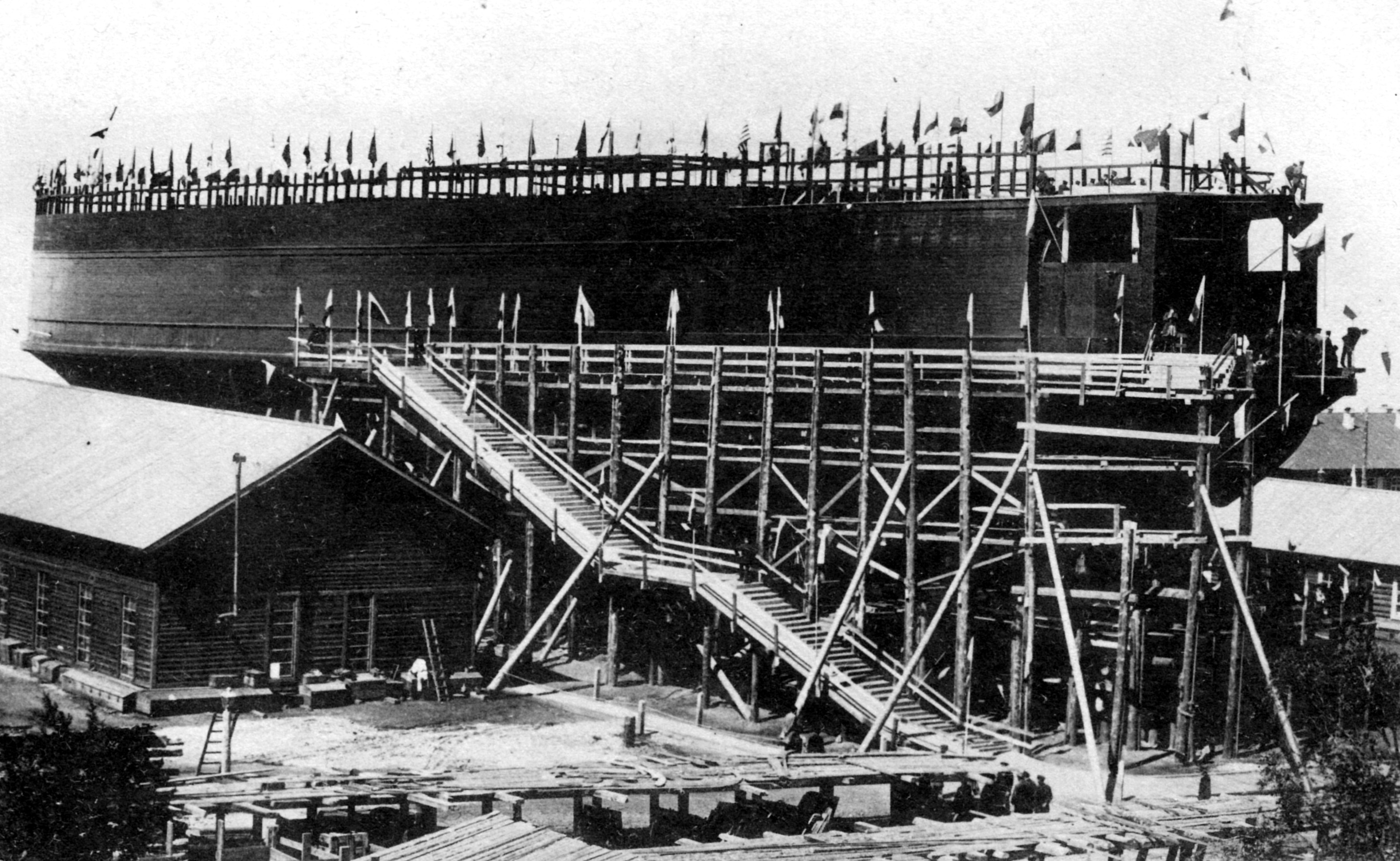
SS Baikal on the day before launching.

On 15 August 1918, the icebreaker was damaged by field artillery fire from the White Forces of the Czechoslovak Legion during the Battle of Lake Baikal. It was burnt at the Mysovaya pier and sunk alongside.

In 1920 the damaged hull was refloated and towed to Port Baikal. It remained untouched until at least 1926, and was later dismantled. There is a possibility that its lower hull, bow propeller, and part of the engines are still at the bottom of the lake at the mouth of the Angara River.
