= Battle of Lake Baikal =

1918 battle of the Russian Civil War

- Part of the Russian Civil War
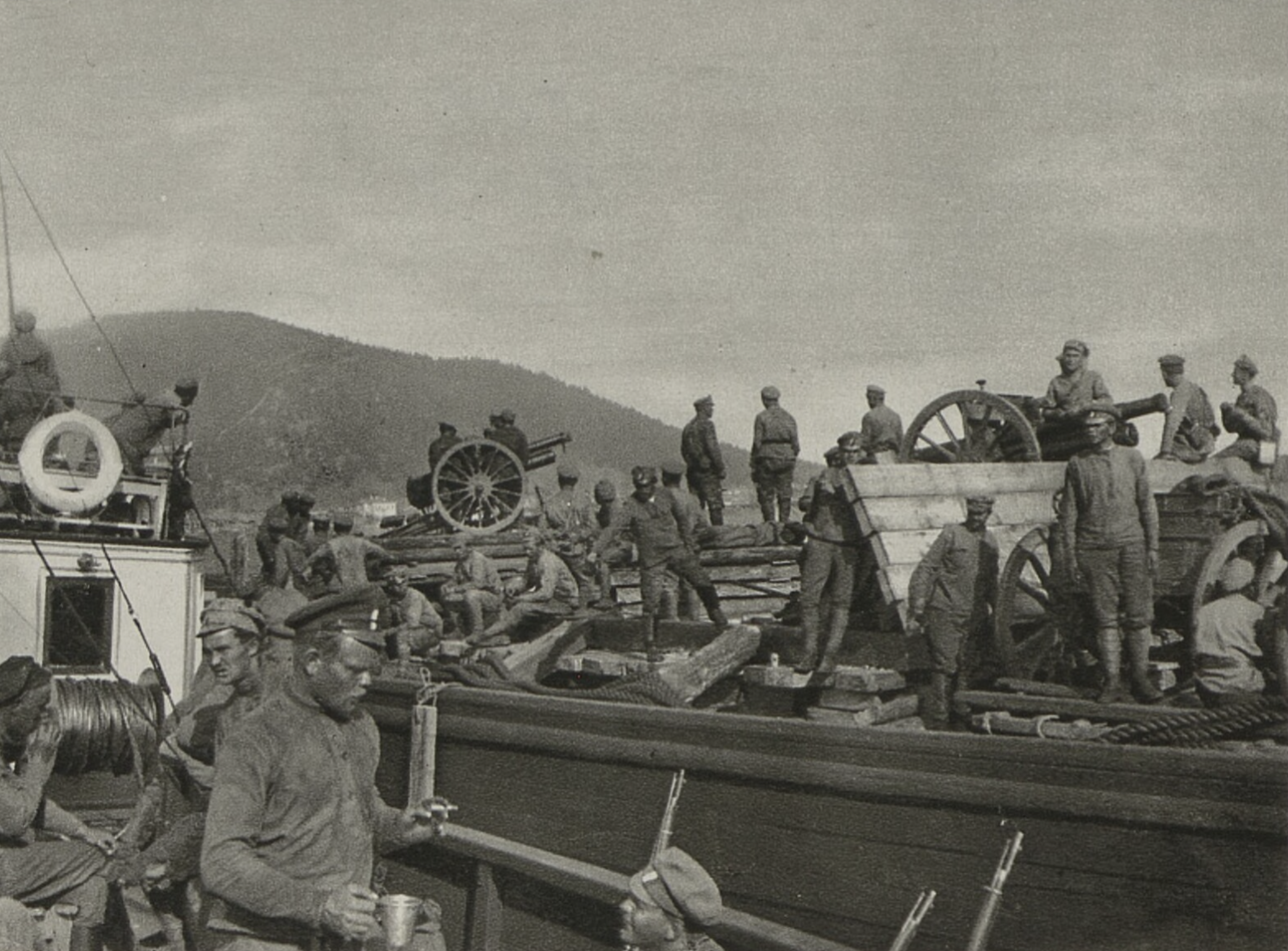
- Trailer boats batteries of the Czechoslovak ships before the battle
Date	16 August 1918
Location	Lake Baikal, Siberia
Result	Czechoslovak victory

Belligerents
(Bohemia) Czechoslovak Legion	Russian SFSR

Commanders and leaders
(Bohemia) Radola Gajda	

Strength
2 steamships armed with 4 howitzers	The ships Baikal and Angara, defense of Mysovsk and an armored train

Casualties and losses
19 men killed in action or missing in action	Baikal severely damaged, harbor and train station destroyed

The Battle of Lake Baikal was a naval battle undertaken by Czechoslovak forces during the Russian Civil War.

== Background ==
In August 1918, the Czechoslovak Legion, under the leadership of Radola Gajda, fought the Red Army for control of the mountain passes around Lake Baikal which were well defended. Gajda was troubled by the fact that Baikal was completely under the control of the Red Army's ships, which threatened the Czechoslovak units with landing units to the legion's rear.

While occupying various ports on the shores of the Baikal, the Czechoslovak legionaries managed to capture two enemy steamships, the Sibirjak and the Fedosia. These were later refitted with a pair of howitzers each.

== Battle ==
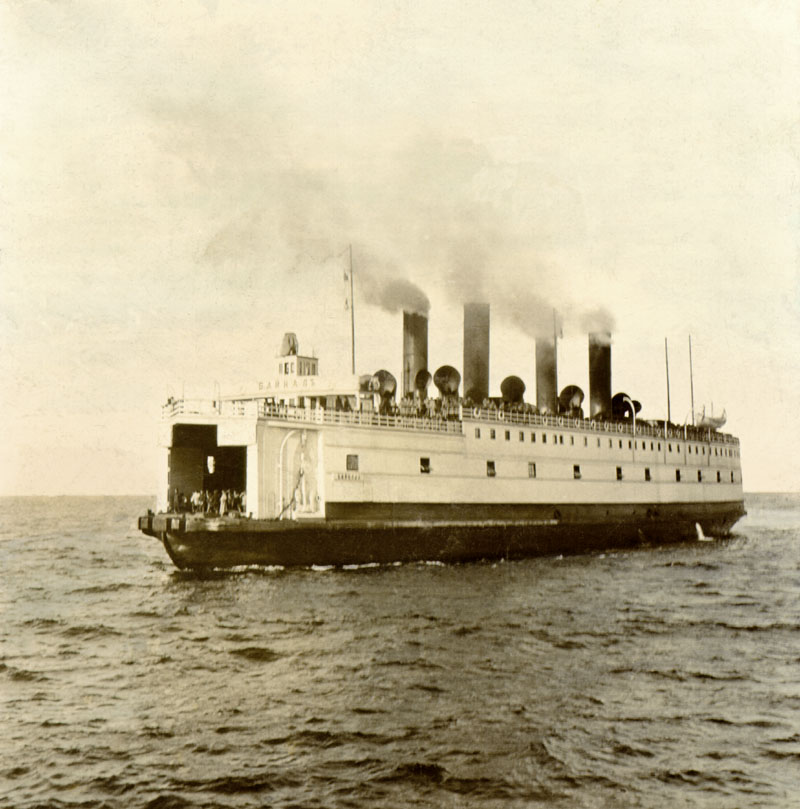
The ferry-icebreaker SS Baikal was armed and used by the Red Army during the battle.

On 15 August 1918, the Czechoslovak fleet sailed out of Listvyanka. By noon on 16 August, the ships were about 8 kilometres (5 mi) from the port in Mysovsk (now Babushkin) in heavy fog. After a few minutes, the fog started dissipating and the ships spotted Mysovsk.

The Red Army forces defending the town were under the impression that the approaching ships were friendly vessels bringing in supplies. This allowed the ships to approach the harbor to a distance of approximately 4 kilometres (2 mi). By the time the defenders of Mysovsk realized their error, it was too late. The ferry-icebreaker SS Baikal tried to initiate fire upon the Czechoslovak ships but the latter were faster. They began to fire, both at the Baikal and at the harbor. The Baikal was set ablaze and general confusion erupted in Mysovsk. The train station was in flames. An armored train arrived after half an hour of Czechoslovak bombardment. Guns were offloaded from it and began to return fire upon the Czechoslovak ships. Since the main mission of destroying the harbor and train station were completed, the legionaries left the battle. On the return journey they met the enemy ship Angara which decided to evade battle. The rest of the journey was uneventful and they returned to Listvyanka without any further incidents. The Baikal was run aground and left burning for some days before being towed and ultimately scrapped.

== Aftermath ==
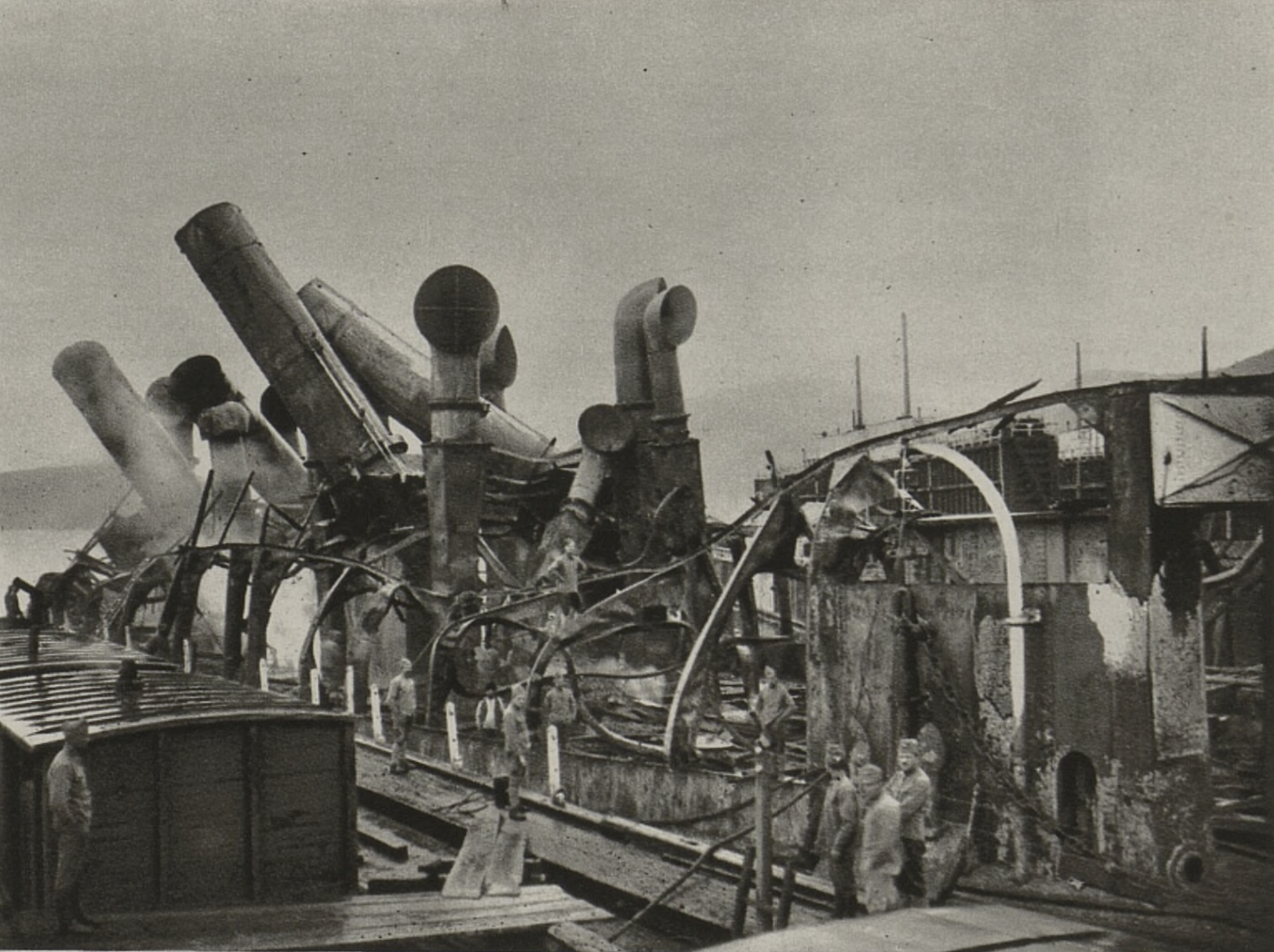
Baikal after the battle with the Czech gunboats

News of the Czechoslovak Legion's campaign in Siberia during the summer of 1918 was welcomed by Allied statesmen in Great Britain and France, who saw the operation as a means to reconstitute the Eastern Front against Germany. U.S. President Woodrow Wilson, who had resisted earlier Allied proposals to intervene in Russia, gave in to domestic and foreign pressure to support the legionaries' evacuation from Siberia. In early July 1918, he published an aide-mémoire calling for a limited intervention in Siberia by the U.S. and Japan to rescue the Czechoslovak troops, who had been blocked by Bolshevik forces in Transbaikal.

However, the Czechoslovaks had already fought their way through. By the time most American and Japanese units landed in Vladivostok, the Czechoslovaks were already there to welcome them. The Allied intervention in Siberia continued so that by autumn of 1918, there were 70,000 Japanese, 829 British, 1,400 Italian, 5,002 American and 107 French colonial (Vietnamese) troops in the region. Many of these contingents supported anti-Bolshevik Russians and Cossack warlords who had established regional governments in the wake of the Czechoslovak seizure of the Trans-Siberian Railway.

The Czechoslovak Legion's campaign in Siberia impressed Allied statesmen and attracted them to the idea of an independent Czechoslovak state. As the legionaries cruised from one victory to another that summer, the Czechoslovak National Council began receiving official statements of recognition from various Allied governments.

== See also ==
- Bibliography of the Russian Revolution and Civil War
- Outline of the Russian Revolution and Civil War
- Index of articles related to the Russian Revolution and Civil War
- The "Russian" Civil Wars, 1916–1926: Ten Years That Shook the World
- Russia in Flames: War, Revolution, Civil War, 1914–1921
- Russia in Revolution: An Empire in Crisis, 1890 to 1928
- Russia: Revolution and Civil War, 1917—1921
- The Russian Revolution: A New History
