= Baykal (port) =

Rural locality in Russia

Coordinates: 51°52′25″N 104°47′27″E

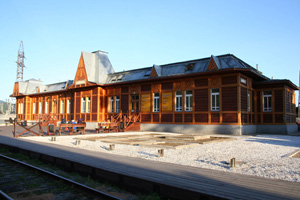
Baykal station

Baykal (port) (Russian: Байка́л (порт)) is a rural locality (a settlement) in Slyudyansky District of Irkutsk Oblast, Russia, located near Lake Baikal on the left bank of the Angara River, 60 kilometers (37 mi) south of Irkutsk, the administrative center of the oblast. Population: 425 (2010 census); 504 (2002 census); 613 (1989 Soviet census).

== History ==
Baykal (port) had work settlement status until February 1, 2014, when it was demoted to a rural locality.

== Transportation ==
The town is the terminus of the Circum-Baikal Railway. There is an automobile ferry to Listvyanka, a work settlement on the opposite side of the river.
