= Kultuk, Slyudyansky District, Irkutsk Oblast =

Kultuk Култук
- Urban-type settlement
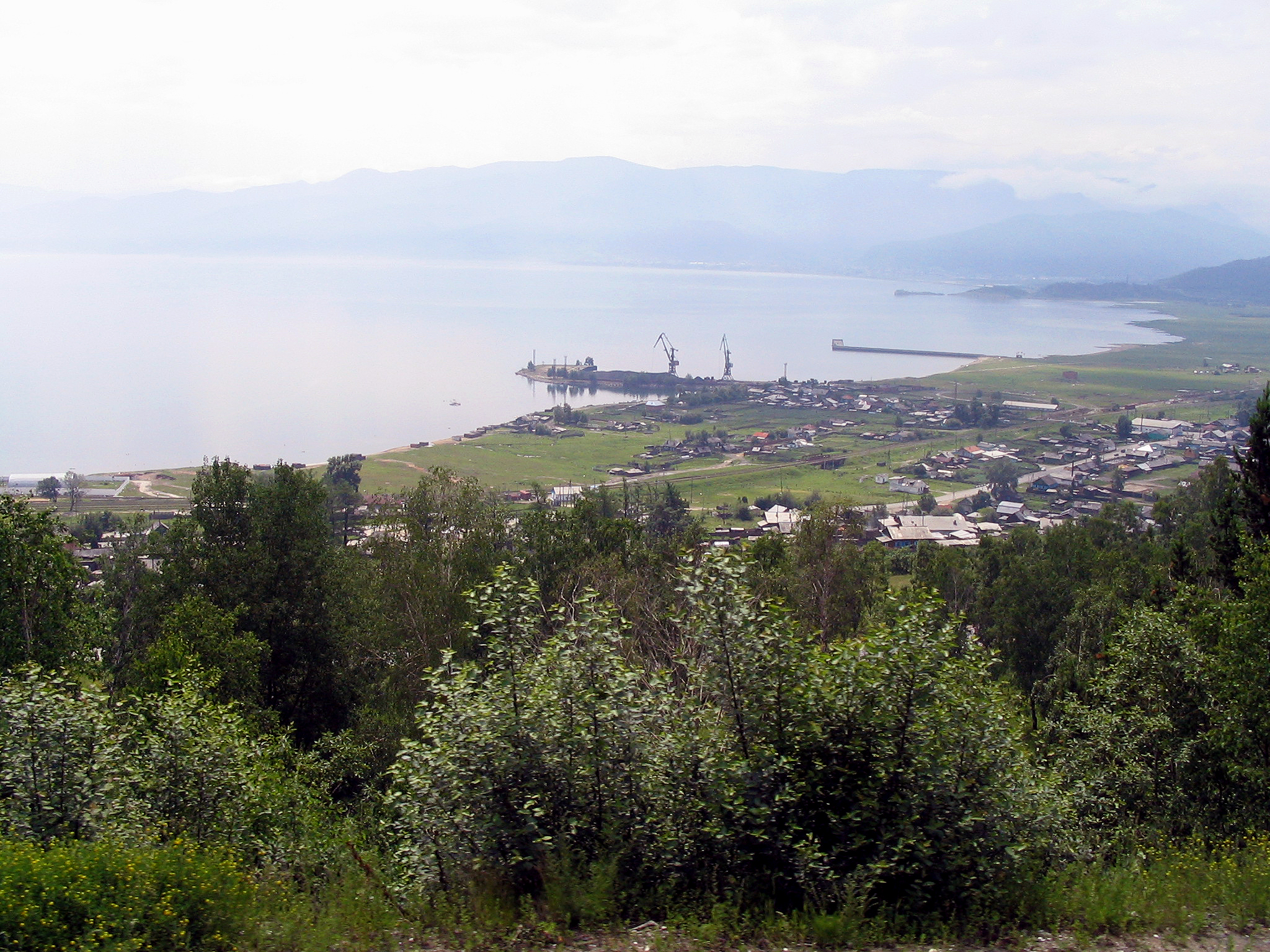
- Kultuk as seen from the Trans-Siberian Railway
- Interactive map of Kultuk
- Location of Kultuk Kultuk (Irkutsk Oblast)
- Coordinates: 51°43′N 103°41′E
- Country: Russia
- Federal subject: Irkutsk Oblast
- Administrative district: Slyudyansky District
- Founded: 1647

Population (2010 Census)
  - Total: 3,728
  - Estimate (2025): 3,312 (−11.2%)
- Time zone: UTC+8 (MSK+5)
- Postal code: 665911
- OKTMO ID: 25634162051

Kultuk (Russian: Култук) is an urban locality (a work settlement) in Slyudyansky District of Irkutsk Oblast, Russia, located on the southwestern tip of Lake Baikal. Population: 3,728 (2010 census); 4,262 (2002 census); 5,370 (1989 Soviet census).

The community is the site of a Chinese-owned water bottling factory under construction as of 2019.

== History ==
It was established in 1647.
