= Angara (icebreaker) =

Museum in Irkutsk, Russia

Icebreaker Angara Museum
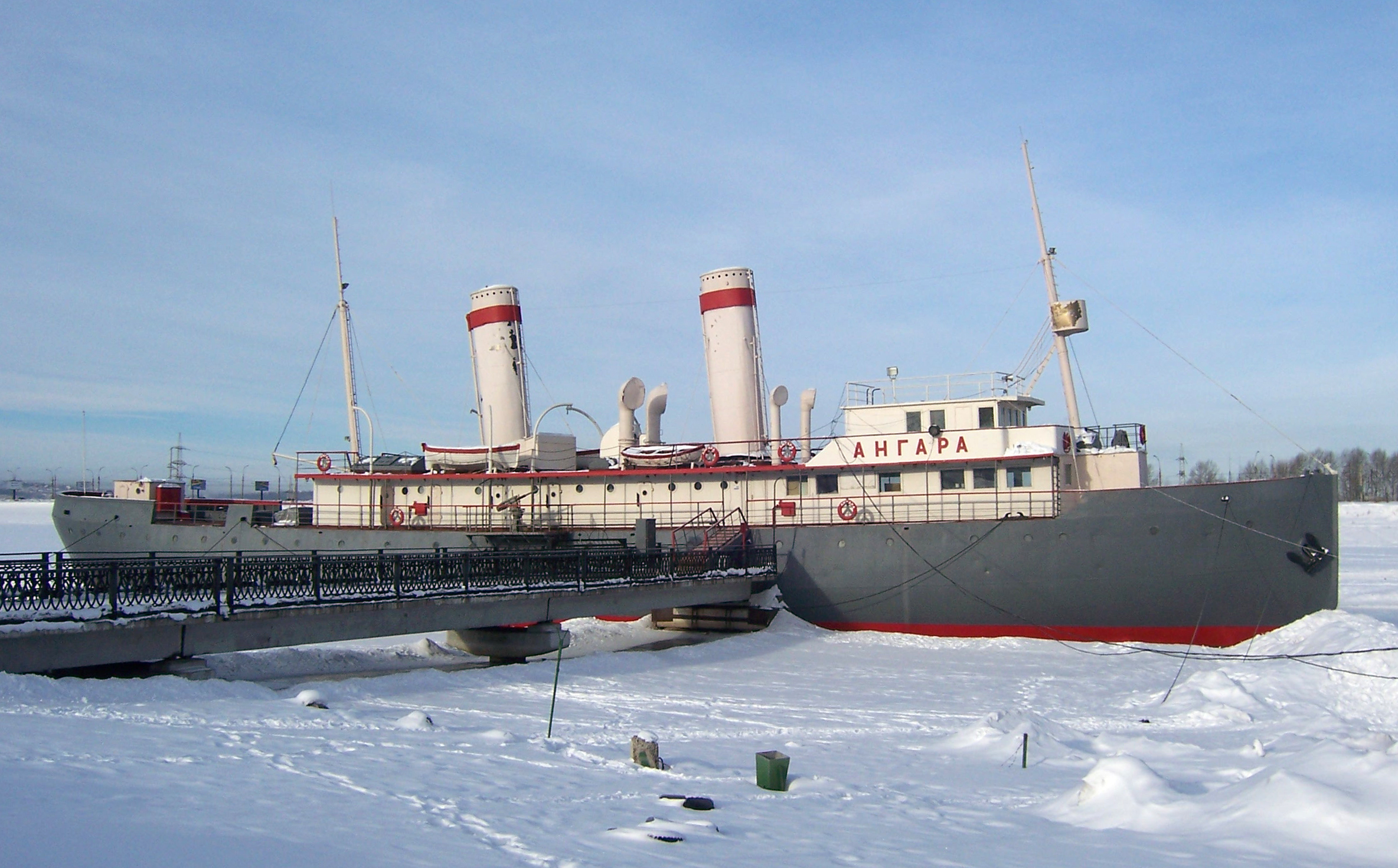

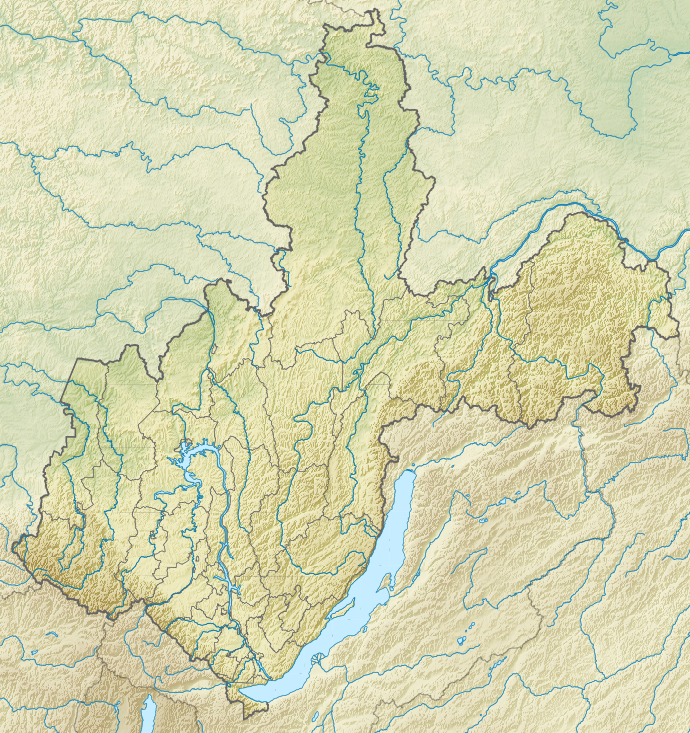
- Location within Irkutsk Oblast
- Established: March 1991
- Location: Irkutsk, Irkutsk Oblast, Russia
- Coordinates: 52°15′00.6″N 104°20′38.3″E
- Type: museum ship

The Icebreaker Angara Museum is a museum ship in Irkutsk, Irkutsk Oblast, Russia.

== History ==
The museum was originally an icebreaker ordered from Sir V G Armstrong, Vitvort and Co. ship company in Newcastle, United Kingdom in 1898. On 1 August 1900, the ship was put into operation and operated in Lake Baikal. It was used by the Soviet Union until 1949 before it underwent 11 years of reparation. In March 1991, the ship was turned into a museum.

== Architecture ==
The ship has an overall length of 60 meters (196 ft 10 in), a width of 10.5 m (34 ft 5 in) and depth to main deck of 7.5 m (24 ft 7 in).

== See also ==
- List of museums in Russia
