= Vladimir Tomilovsky =

Russian painter

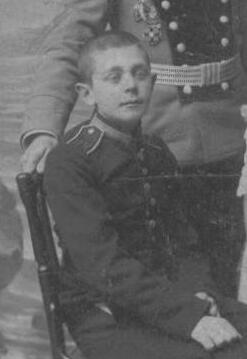
- Born: April 4, 1901; Novogeorgievsk
- Died: June 17, 1991 (aged 90); Irkutsk, Russia
- Known for: Painting,

Vladimir Petrovitch Tomilovsky (Russian: Владимир Петрович Томиловский; March 22 (April 4), 1901 – June 17, 1991) was a Russian landscape painter. His works primarily depicted the nature of Siberia and Lake Baikal.

== Biography ==
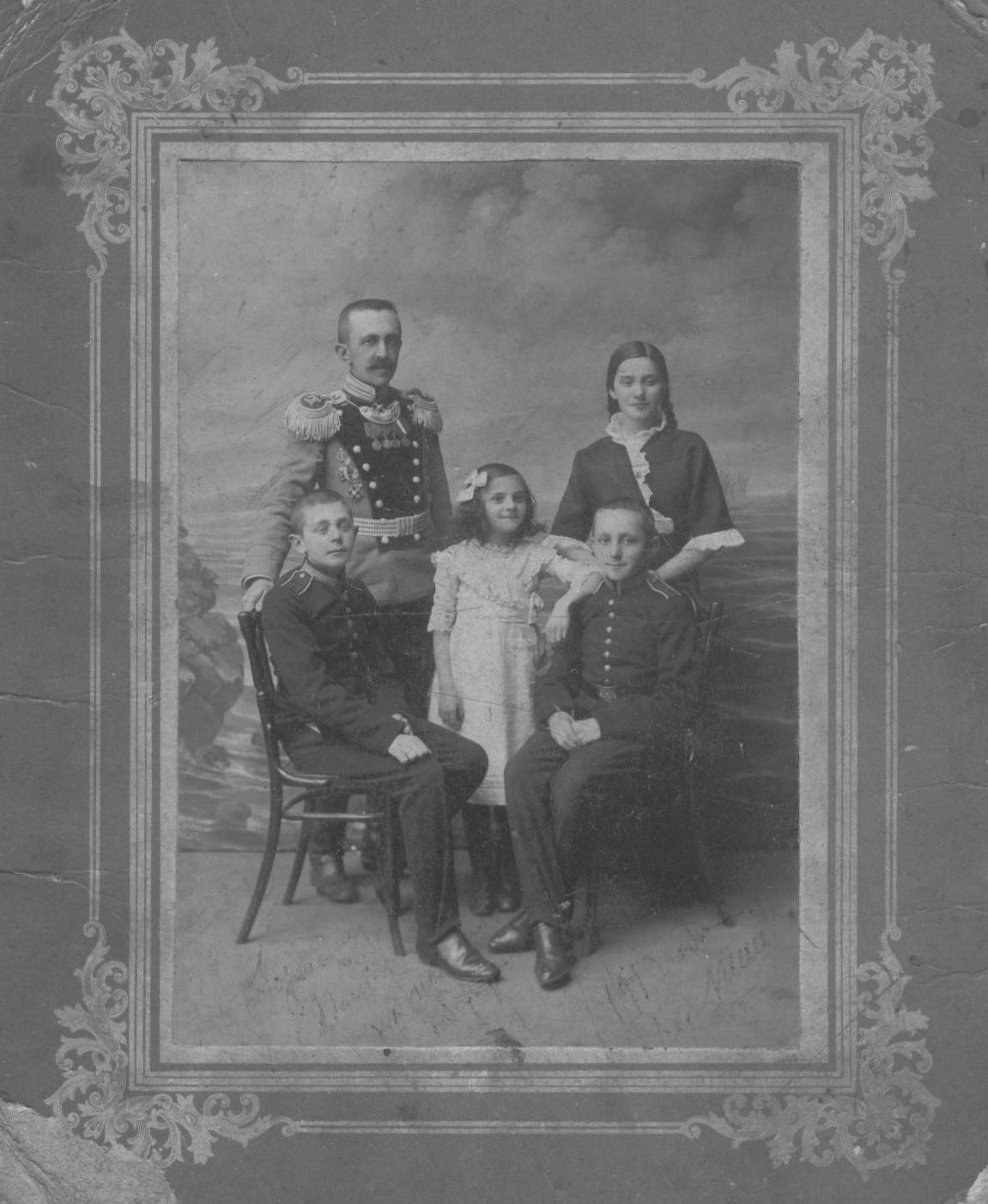
Pyotr Tomilovski with his children, 1915 (V. Tomilovsky is in the bottom left corner)

Vladimir Petrovitch Tomilovsky was born in the township of Novogeorgievsk (Новогеоргиевск) in the former province of Warsaw of the Russian Empire on April 4, 1901, in the family of a Russian military officer. Tomilovsky’s grandfather was a General of the Russian Army and his father – Pyotr Petrovitch Tomilovsky (Петр Петрович Томиловский) - was a Colonel of the Russian Army and one of the first hot air balloons aeronauts. His mother – Maria Tomilovskaya, whose maiden name was Marie Pitz-Noirot – was born in Paris and went to Russia as a French language teacher. The family had four children: Nadezhda, Vladimir, Pyotr, and Maria. Due to dislocations of the military missions, the family had to move a lot so Vladimir Tomilovsky spent his early years in the city of Ulan-Ude in Siberia. At the age of nine, Tomilovsky was sent to the military school in the city of Irkutsk in Eastern Siberia, where the family resided at that time. Drawing became the favourite subject among all the school disciplines for young Vladimir.

After graduation from the military school in 1917, Vladimir Tomilovsky started his service in the engineering division of the Admiral Kolchak’s army; however, his life took a sharp turn when he entered the Red Army in 1919 and served there up till 1924 leaving the military service with the rank of Chief of Staff at the 14th cavalry squadron of the special purpose division. Following his military service, from 1920 to 1921, Vladimir studied painting in the art studio in the city of Tomsk (Siberia). From 1926 to 1930, he continued art studies in Irkutsk courses of painting art which were given by Ivan Kopylov (Иван Лаврович Копылов), an alumnus of the Paris Art Academy. In the meantime, Tomilovsky married Tatyana Kazakova (Татьяна Алексеевна Казакова) in 1924, and on May 10, 1927 their daughter Maria was born.

Tomilovsky moved to Moscow in 1930 to continue his art education, in the Moscow Academy of Arts. His studies were postponed as he had to make a living and he started working as an artist in the city’s committee of fine art. In 1934 Vladimir Tomilovsky was taken by the vortex of political repressions as got accused of attempt of Sergey Kirov’s life (C.М. Киров) under the article 58. Following this accusation, Tomilovsky spent 2,5 years in the prison camp and was released in 1937 without a right to reside or even visit Moscow. That is why he decided to move back to Irkutsk where his family was waiting for him. Shortly after his return to Irkutsk, Vladimir Tomilovsky became a member of the Union of Artists of the USSR.

On the day after Germany started the war against the Soviet Union, Tomilovsky submitted his application as a volunteer to enter the Soviet Army but got refused. In order to help, he started working on creation of the agitation posters in the workshops of ‘Agit-OKNA TASS’. During the war period Tomilovsky produced a number of posters and drawings in the local newspapers in order to support the anti-fascist movement. In 1943 Tomilovsky was elected as the Chairman of the Irkutsk branch of the Union of Soviet Artists. He was working in this position until the end of the war. Starting from 1946, for six times in a row Tomilovsky was elected as Head of the Audit Committee of the Union of Artists in Irkutsk, each time for the duration of two years. Between 1956 and 1961 he was appointed as the Chief Artist of the city of Irkutsk. Since that period, Tomilovsky was a permanent member of the Audit Committee of the Irkutsk Union of Artists. Helping young artists was considered to be one of his main priorities at work.

The final rehabilitation from his political accusations reached Tomilovsky only in 1982. The real reason for his prison sentence was finally disclosed in the KGB archives – it was his belonging to the Russian Army General’s family which was the true cause of his camp sentence. Up till his death in 1991, Vladimir Tomilovsky worked in his studio in Irkutsk where he produced well over a thousand paintings. Tomilovsky died on June 17, 1991, in Irkutsk at the age of 90.

The paintings of Vladimir Tomilovsky are permanently exhibited in a number of museums and art galleries in Russia. They are also part of some private collections around the world: in Irkutsk, Moscow, Saint-Petersburg (Russia), Almaty (Kazakhstan), Paris (France), Athens (Greece), Ashkelon, Ashdod (Israel), Zurich (Switzerland), London (UK), Brno (Czech Republic). His paintings were exhibited in Russia and abroad: in Germany, Japan, Mongolia and US, as well as sold on auction sales such as Christie’s in the UK.

== Creative work ==
=== Siberian landscapes ===
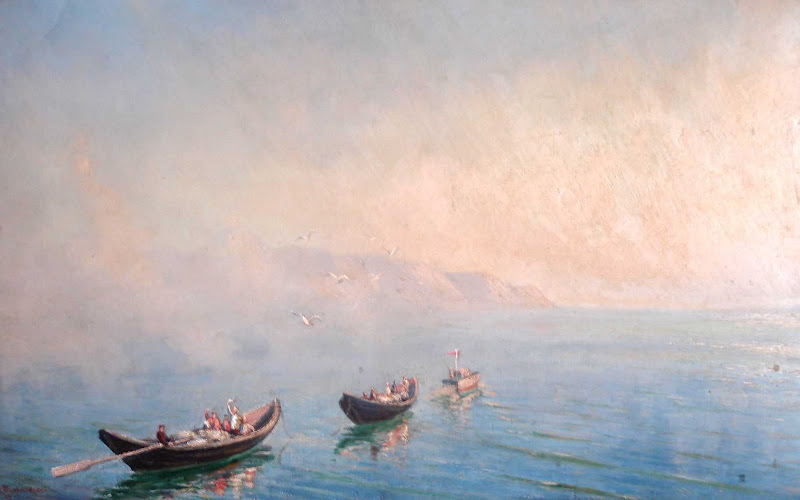
Fishermen at lake Baikal, 1949

Looking at Tomilovsky’s creative life, one can easily trace the main milestones of its development. The beginning of his career as an artist was clearly marked by the landscape painting. According to the opinion of an Irkutsk-based artist Alexandra Madisson, Tomilovsky ‘felt the nature’ and had an ability to see the significant in the unnoticeable at first sight. And that is why he excelled in so-called ‘intimate landscapes’, full of warm, lyrical mood. The further Tomilovsky developed as an artist, the more optimistic and sunnier his paintings became. One of the main topics of his art was Lake Baikal which is situated in Siberia, near the city of Irkutsk where the artist spent the most of his life. Vladimir Tomilovsky knew Baikal very well: for years he had been walking along its shores, sailed it a number of times and always paid great attention to the water of the lake in his painting that capture hundreds of its shades. Despite a human being is rarely depicted on Tomilovsky’s paintings, one could always feel the human presence. Tomilovsky wrote his paintings for people, in order to bring us closer the treasures of nature. Probably that is why the painting called ‘The Pearl of Lake Baikal’ is exhibited for many years in the Museum of the Irkutsk Limnological Institute situated on the shore of the lake.

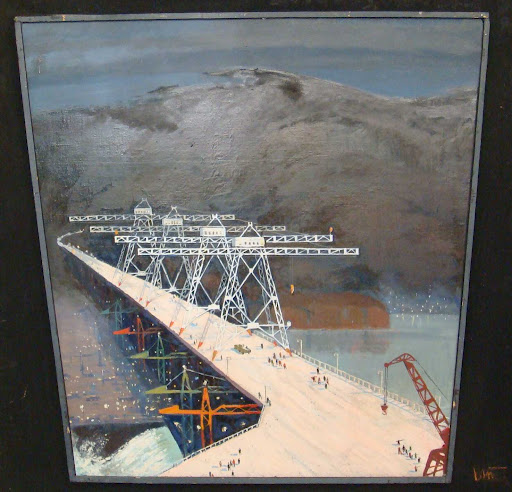
Construction of Ust-Ilimskaya Hydroelectric Station, 1984

=== Constriction of hydroelectric stations in Siberia ===
In the beginning of the early 1970s, many things that Tomilovsky painted before stopped satisfying him. He suddenly felt the fast pulse of the new industrial developments in Siberia. Being inspired by the technological progress, Tomilovsky asked himself a profound question: ‘what should a new art be like?’ He answered his question with a new topic in his art dedicated to depicting the massive hydroelectric stations construction sites, which were the grandest and the most inspirational developments in Siberia at that time. This new inspiration was a major turn in the artist’s creative style as Tomilovsky decided that such pieces of art should not be ‘painted’ but rather ‘constructed’ as the industrial developments themselves. It was the new style of Tomilovsky’s paintings which aimed to depict the grandeur and scale of the Soviet construction projects of the second half of the 20th century. According to A. Madisson, this period of Tomilovsky’s art could be characterised by the opinion he stated at the opening of one of his exhibitions: ‘We should enter the spaciousness of the brand new art, wide vision, and bolder solutions, where all the small and unnecessary is swept aside’.

=== The Eternity theme ===
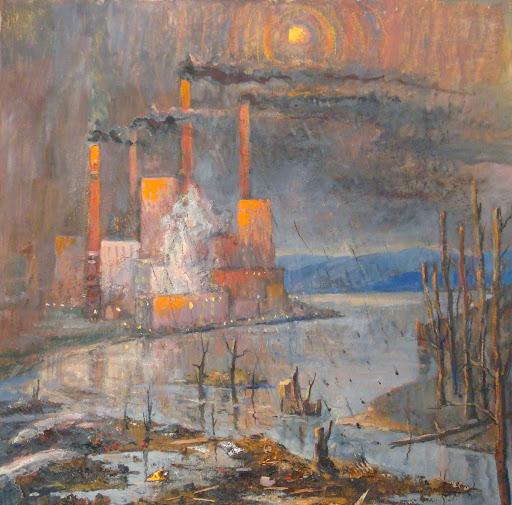
On the edge of the 21st century, 1990

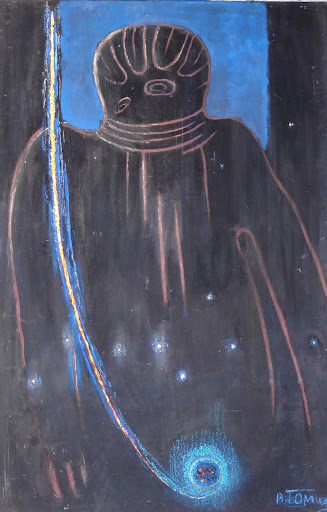
The Great Martian God (fresco)

A new turn signified the late period of Tomilovsky’s creative live. His art became more laconic and the themes of endless cosmic eternity and the momentary human life became more pronounced. One can find these reflections in the works like ‘The Great Martian God’, where Tomilovsky depicted the supernatural forces, the universal mind, and the planet of Earth at its origin. In the late works of the artist, one would not find admiration of the Soviet construction sites anymore. Instead, the message about the fragility of our planet and its nature in front of relentless urbanisation and environmental concerns sounds stronger. The painting called On the edge of the 21st century is a vivid example of these concerns. An Irkutsk-based writer Larisa Lankina wrote in one of her articles that ‘the planet of Earth in Tomilovsky’s art resembles a fragile Christmas ball seen by the artist from the emptiness of the outer worlds; and it becomes the symbol of the human responsibility for its future’.

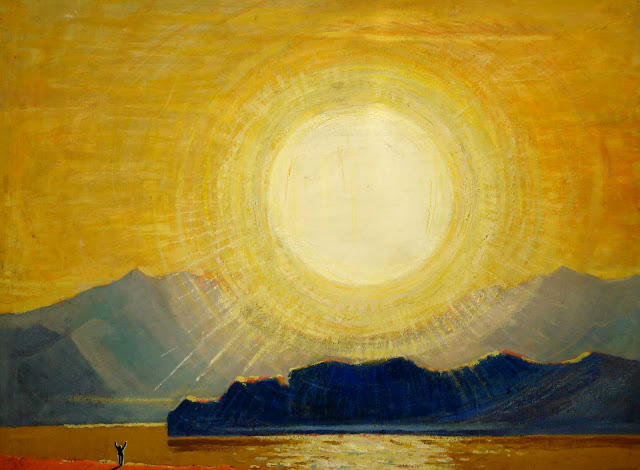
Sunrise

=== The Sun Worshipper ===
A very special place in Tomilovsky’s creative work was dedicated to the Sun which is the centrepiece of many artist’s artworks. At the opening of one of the exhibitions, an Irkutsk-based art critic Paletskaya nicknamed Tomilovsky ‘the worshipper of the sun’, which was immediately picked up by some of his colleagues. Tomilovsky acknowledged that, indeed, the Sun was one of his favourite objects to depict in his paintings, especially during the post-war years. The art critics wrote that it seemed like Tomilovsky lived ‘closer to the sun’, admired it, and transferred its shining rays onto his painting.

=== Conclusion ===
At one of his exhibitions which included more than a hundred of paintings, Vladimir Tomilovsky was asked if he regretted that many of his more than a thousand works were not exhibited due to the space constraints. He answered this question as follows: ‘In order to evaluate a creative path of an artist, understand his or her soul, one could organise an exhibition consisting of five paintings. But what kind of paintings should they be? The exhibition may include one single painting. But this only painting must be created, and it could be created by an artist throughout the whole life’.

== Gallery ==
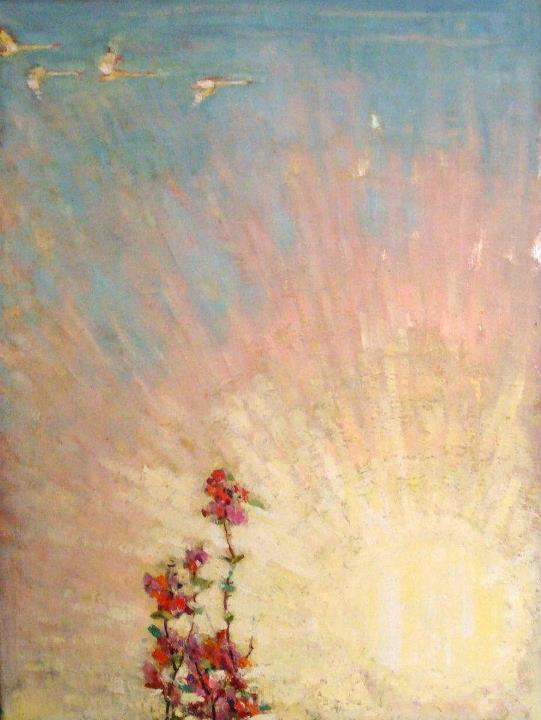
Flying cranes, 1963.

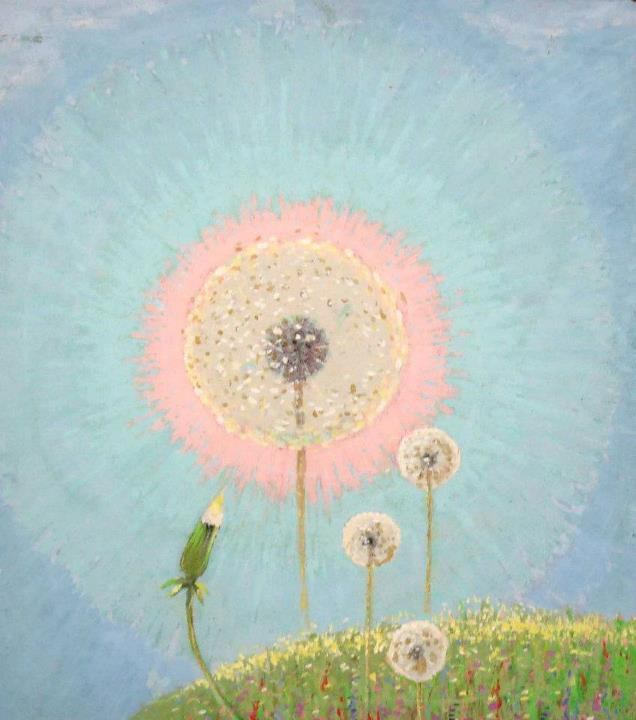
Dandelion, 1975.

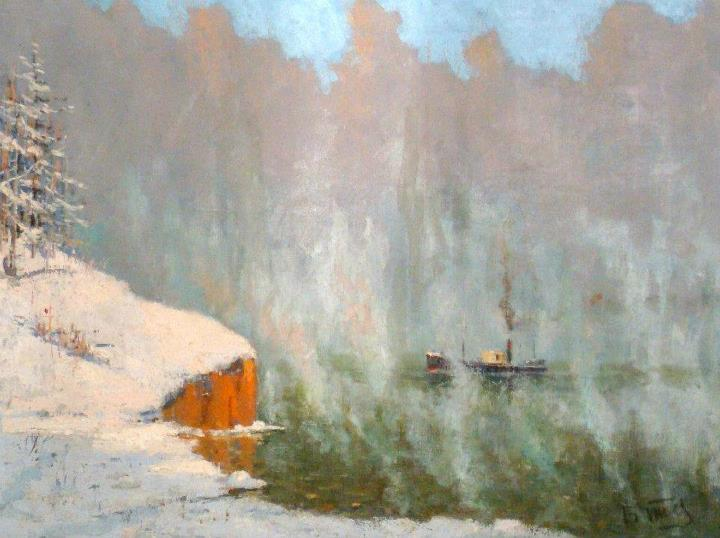
Baikal in January, 1968.

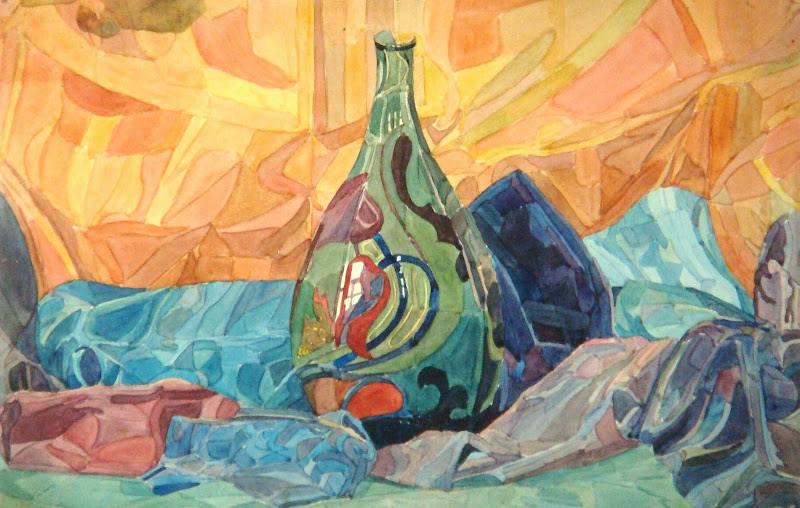
Abstract Vase, 1924-26.

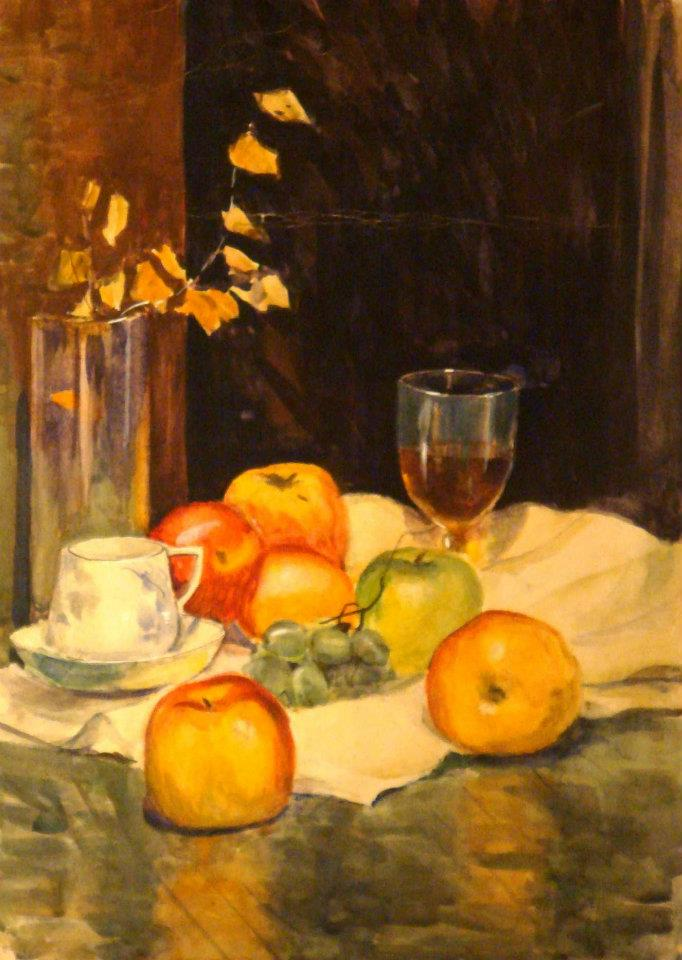
Nature morte with apples, 1957.

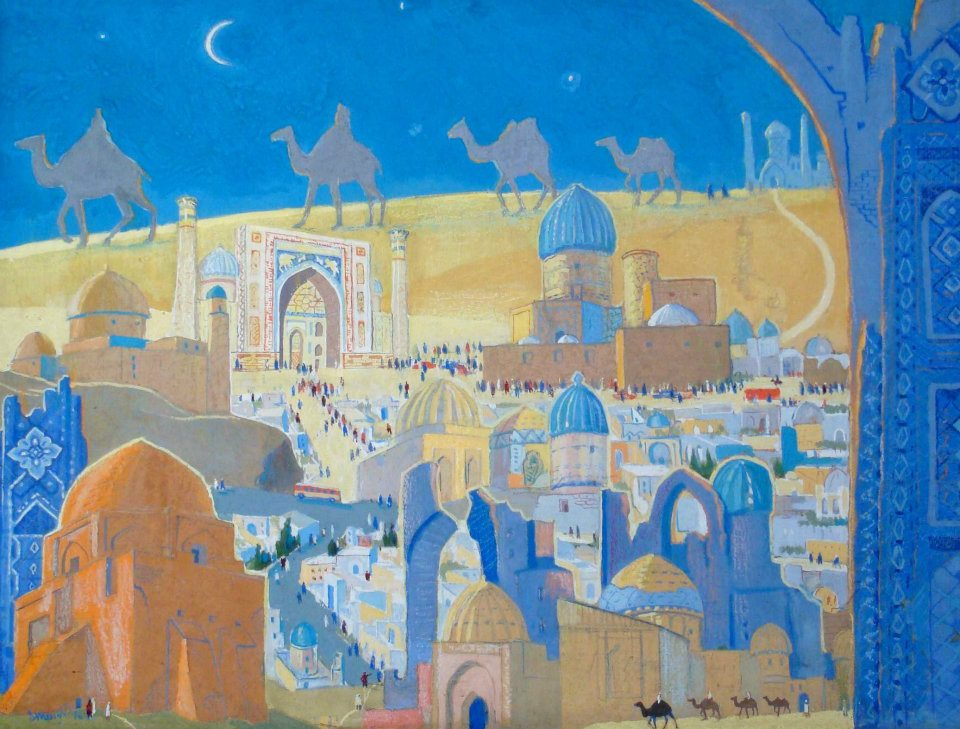
Uzbekistan

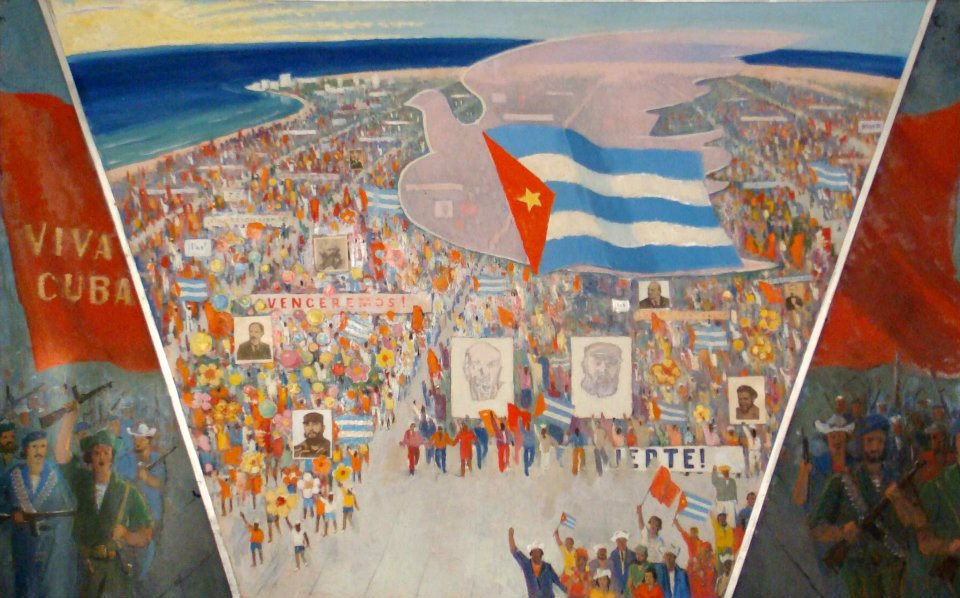
Cuba
