= Slyudyanka =

Town in Irkutsk Oblast, Russia

Slyudyanka Слюдянка
- Town
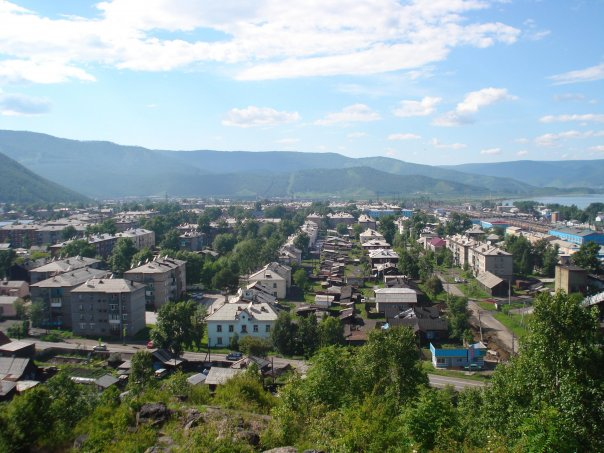
- View of Slyudyanka

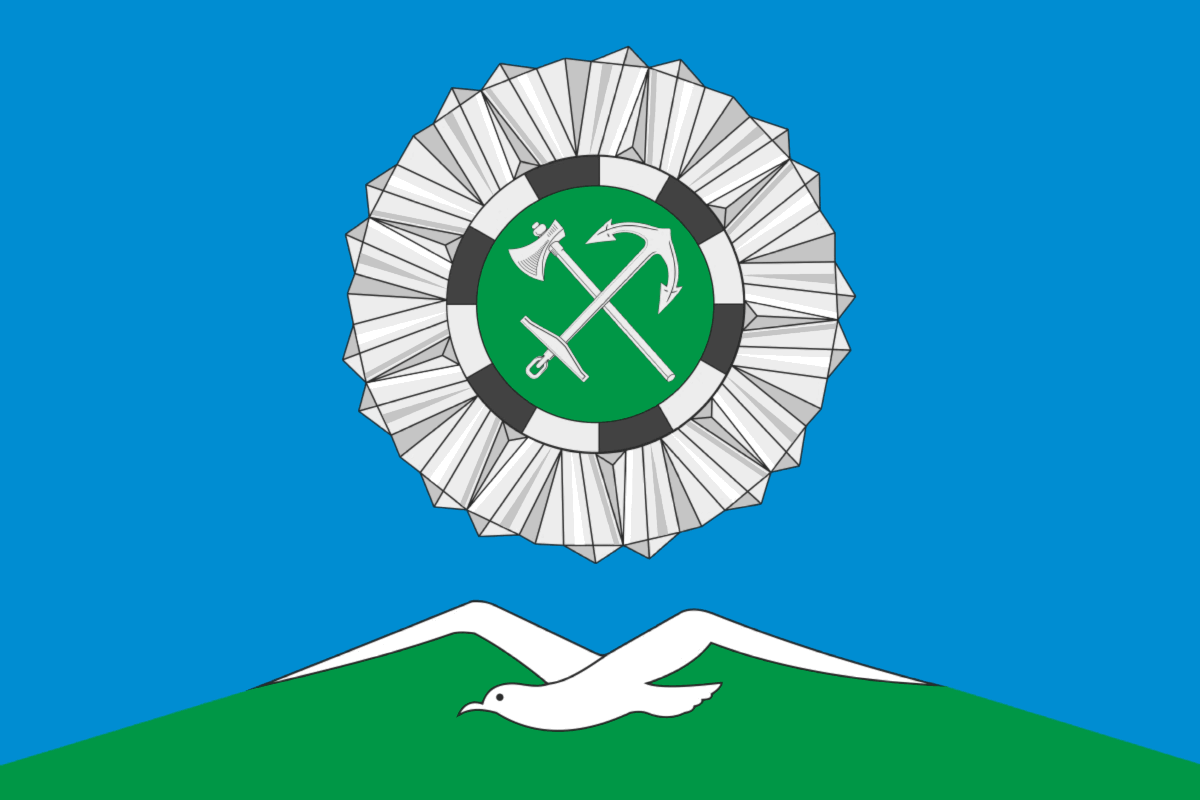
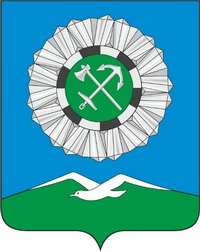
- Flag Coat of arms
- Interactive map of Slyudyanka
- Location of Slyudyanka Slyudyanka (Irkutsk Oblast)
- Coordinates: 51°39′24″N 103°43′07″E
- Country: Russia
- Federal subject: Irkutsk Oblast
- Administrative district: Slyudyansky District
- Founded: 1905
- Town status since: 1936

Area
  - Total: 38 km^{2} (15 sq mi)
- Elevation: 470 m (1,540 ft)

Population (2010 Census)
  - Total: 18,574
  - Estimate (2013): 18,626 (+0.3%)
  - Density: 490/km^{2} (1,300/sq mi)

Administrative status
  - Capital of: Slyudyansky District

Municipal status
  - Municipal district: Slyudyansky Municipal District
  - Urban settlement: Slyudyanskoye Urban Settlement
  - Capital of: Slyudyansky Municipal District, Slyudyanskoye Urban Settlement
- Time zone: UTC+8 (MSK+5)
- Postal codes: 665900, 665902–665904
- Dialing code: +7 39544
- OKTMO ID: 25634101001
- Website: www.sludyanka.ru

Slyudyanka (Russian: Слюдянка, IPA: [slʲʉˈdʲankə]) is a town and the administrative center of Slyudyansky District of Irkutsk Oblast, Russia, located at the southern tip of Lake Baikal, 126 kilometers (78 mi) south of Irkutsk, the administrative center of the oblast. Population: 18,574 (2010 census); 19,118 (2002 census); 19,872 (1989 Soviet census).

The town is a stop and major railroad junction for the Trans-Siberian Railway, and also serves as the starting point for the historic Circum-Baikal Railway.

== Etymology ==
The town takes its name from the Russian word for mica, reflecting the numerous mineral deposits in the area.

== History ==
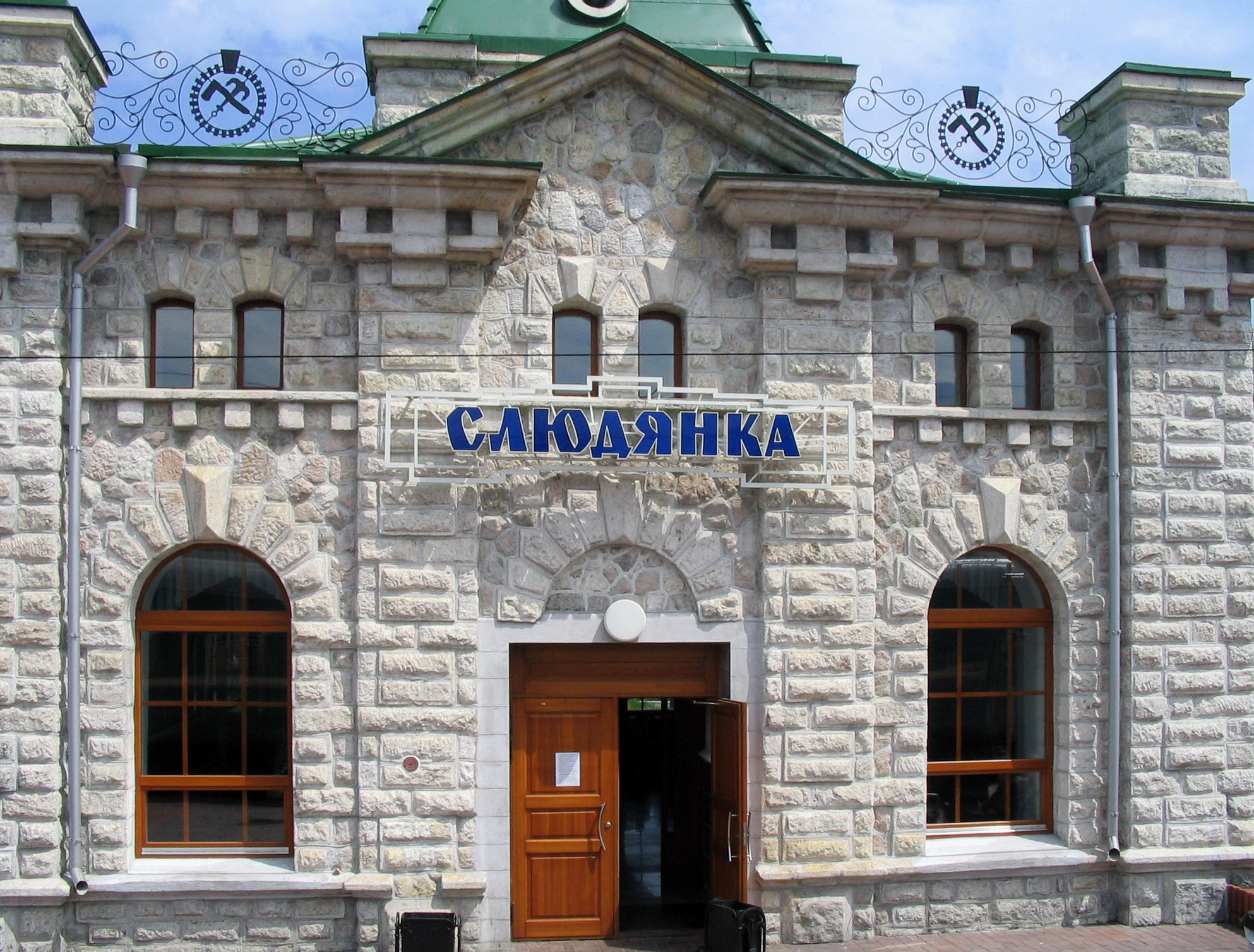
Slyudyanka railway station on the Trans-Siberian Railway

Slyudyanka railway station and a settlement around it were established in 1905. Town status was granted to it in 1936.

== Administrative and municipal status ==
Within the framework of administrative divisions, Slyudyanka serves as the administrative center of Slyudyansky District, to which it is directly subordinated. As a municipal division, the town of Slyudyanka, together with two rural localities in Slyudyansky District, is incorporated within Slyudyansky Municipal District as Slyudyanskoye Urban Settlement.
