= Babushkin (town) =

Town in the Republic of Buryatia, Russia

Babushkin Бабушкин
- Town
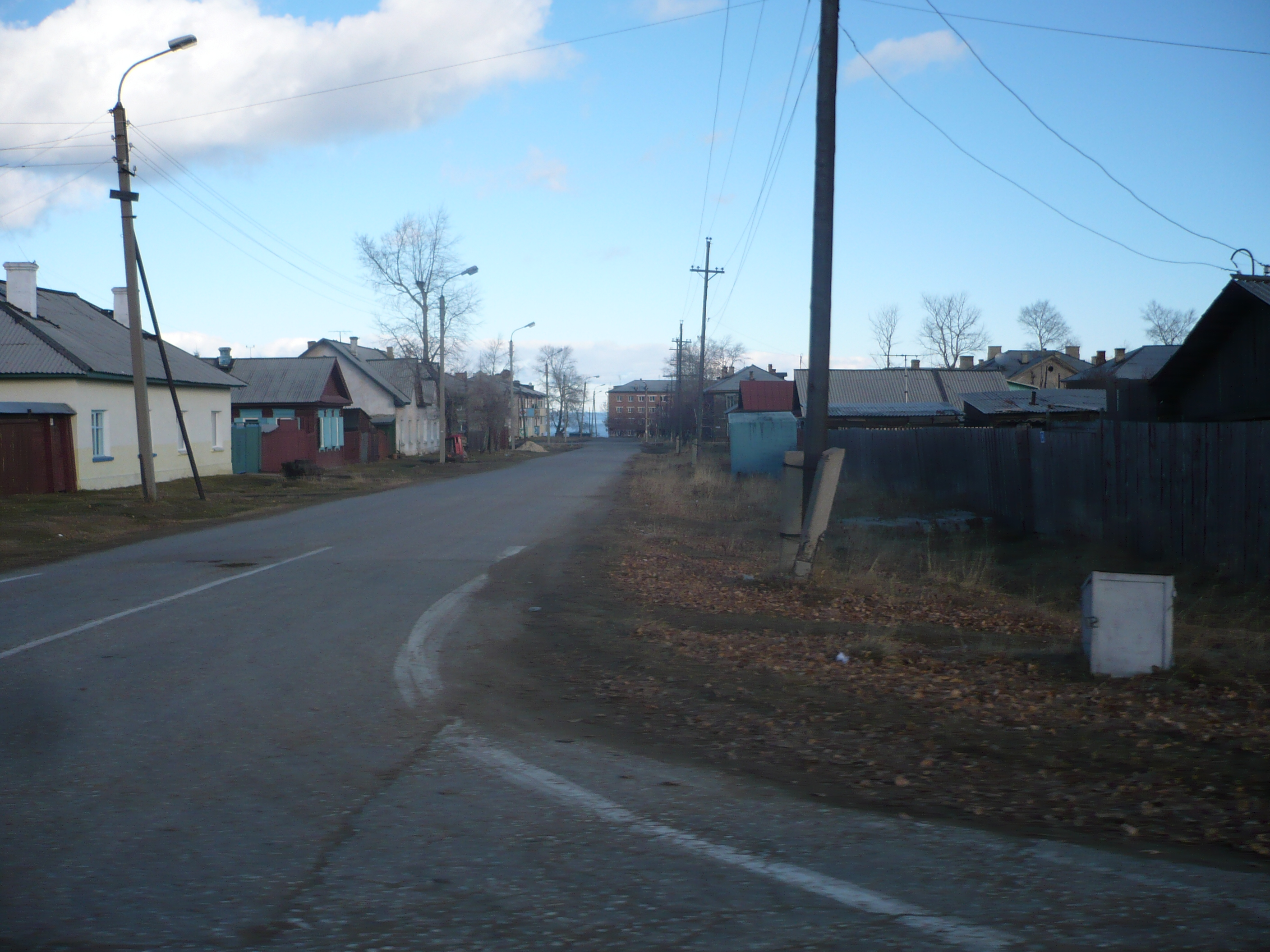
- A street in Babushkin

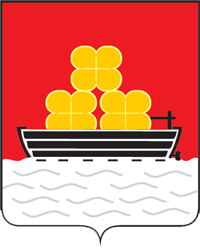
- Coat of arms
- Interactive map of Babushkin
- Location of Babushkin Babushkin (Republic of Buryatia)
- Coordinates: 51°43′N 105°52′E
- Country: Russia
- Federal subject: Buryatia
- Administrative district: Kabansky District
- TownSelsoviet: Babushkin
- Founded: 1892
- Town status since: 1902
- Elevation: 470 m (1,540 ft)

Population (2010 Census)
  - Total: 4,831
  - Estimate (2025): 4,209 (−12.9%)

Administrative status
  - Capital of: Town of Babushkin

Municipal status
  - Municipal district: Kabansky Municipal District
  - Urban settlement: Babushkinskoye Urban Settlement
  - Capital of: Babushkinskoye Urban Settlement
- Time zone: UTC+8 (MSK+5)
- Postal code: 30138
- OKTMO ID: 81624103001

Babushkin (Russian: Ба́бушкин), known as Mysovsk (Мысовск) before 1941, is a town in Kabansky District of the Republic of Buryatia, Russia, located on the southern shore of Lake Baikal on the Trans-Siberian Railway. Population: 4,831 (2010 census); 4,953 (2002 census); 7,298 (1989 Soviet census); 9,000 (1967).

== History ==
It was founded in 1892 as a postal station Mysovaya (Мысовая), its name derived from the Russian word Mys meaning "cape", referring to its location on the shores of Lake Baikal.

A few years later it was chosen as the eastern terminus for the train ferry across Lake Baikal, which was used as part of the Trans-Siberian Railway until the rail line around the southern shore was completed in 1905. It was granted town status under the name Mysovsk in 1902.

It was renamed Babushkin in 1942, in honor of the revolutionary Ivan Babushkin, arrested and executed at Mysovaya station in 1906.

== Administrative and municipal status ==
Within the framework of administrative divisions, it is, together with four rural localities, incorporated as the Town of Babushkin—an administrative division of Kabansky District. As a municipal division, the territory of Babushkin, together with two rural localities, is incorporated within Kabansky Municipal District as Babushkinskoye Urban Settlement. The remaining two rural localities are incorporated as Klyuyevskoye Rural Settlement of Kabansky Municipal District.

== Economy ==
Babushkin is a depot for wood transport on the Trans-Siberian Railway, as well as a tourist center for tours on southern Lake Baikal.
