= Slyudyansky District =

Slyudyansky District Слюдянский район (Russian)
- District
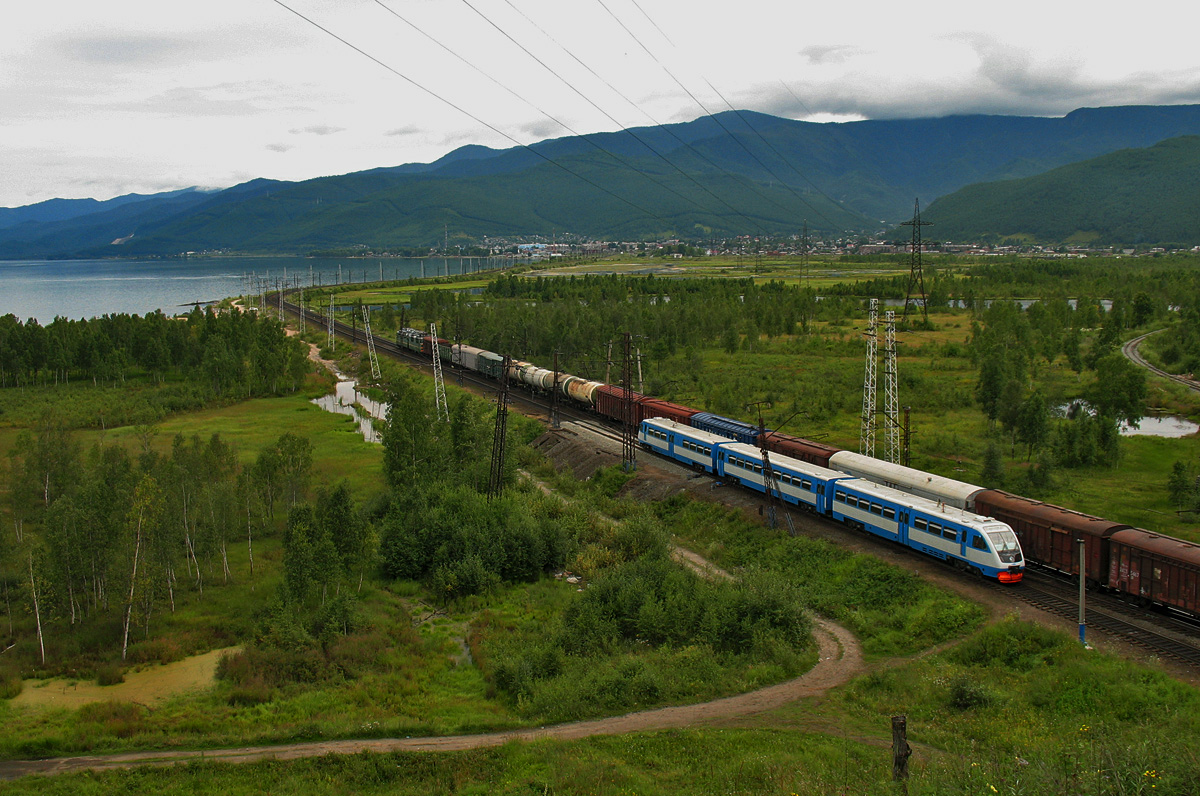
- Trains on Circum-Baikal Railway, Slyudyansky District

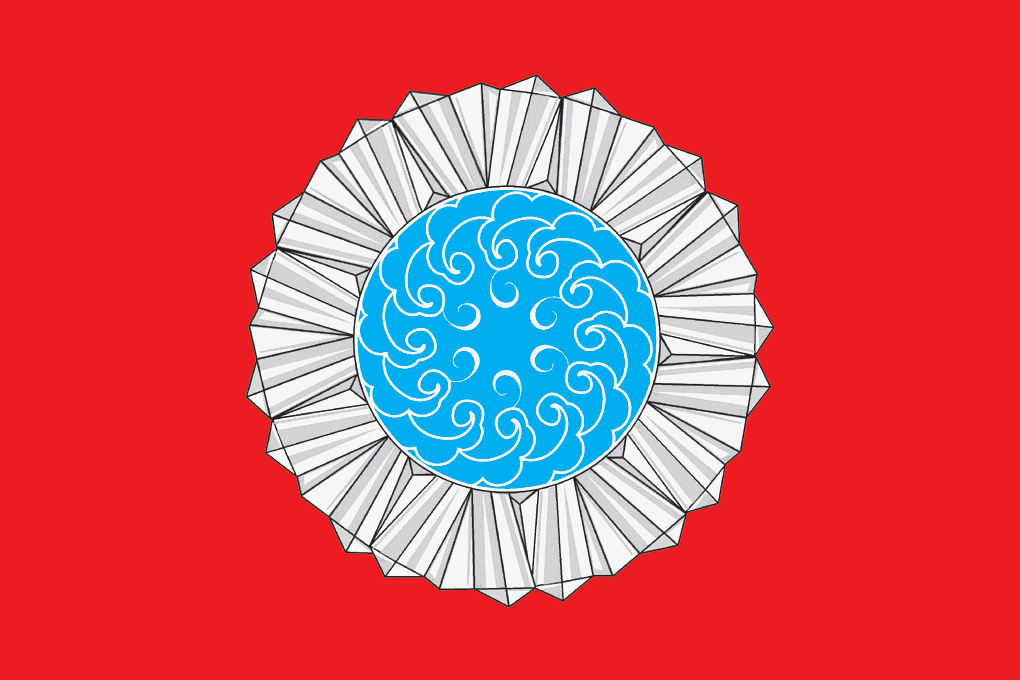
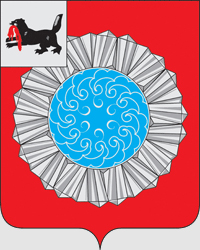
- Flag Coat of arms
- Location of Slyudyansky District (#23) in southern Irkutsk Oblast
- Coordinates: 51°40′N 103°42′E
- Country: Russia
- Federal subject: Irkutsk Oblast
- Established: 23 July 1930
- Administrative center: Slyudyanka

Area
  - Total: 6,301.11 km^{2} (2,432.87 sq mi)

Population (2010 Census)
  - Total: 40,509
  - Density: 6.4289/km^{2} (16.651/sq mi)
  - Urban: 89.6%
  - Rural: 10.4%

Administrative structure
  - Inhabited localities: 2 cities/towns, 1 urban-type settlements, 24 rural localities

Municipal structure
  - Municipally incorporated as: Slyudyansky Municipal District
  - Municipal divisions: 3 urban settlements, 5 rural settlements
- Time zone: UTC+8 (MSK+5)
- OKTMO ID: 25634000
- Website: http://www.sludyanka.ru

Slyudyansky District (Russian: Слюдя́нский райо́н) is an administrative district, one of the thirty-three in Irkutsk Oblast, Russia. Municipally, it is incorporated as Slyudyansky Municipal District. The area of the district is 6,301.11 square kilometers (2,432.87 sq mi). Its administrative center is the town of Slyudyanka. Population: 40,509 (2010 census); 44,039 (2002 Census); 44,697 (1989 Soviet census).

== Administrative and municipal status ==
Within the framework of administrative divisions, Slyudyansky District is one of the thirty-three in the oblast. The town of Slyudyanka serves as its administrative center. As a municipal division, the district is incorporated as Slyudyansky Municipal District.
