= Stanley Kirkby =

English singer (1878–1949)

Stanley Kirkby in the early 1900s. (Note: The handwritten message on this card reads: Sincerely yours Stanley Kirkby; Yours truly Stanley Kirkby)

Stanley Kirkby (born James Baker; 1878 – 30 October 1949) was an English baritone singer and variety artist of the early 20th century. He sang ballads and popular songs of the Edwardian era, the First World War and the inter-War period. He sang mostly in music halls and variety theatres and was a popular recording artist.

Born and brought up in Manchester, Kirkby worked in a warehouse from the age of 12; he went on to win first prize in a baritone singing competition at the age of 22. His career moved to London where he formed a number of collaborations on stage with other variety artists; these became well known for their smartly-dressed and musically excellent performances. In 1915 he teamed up with Harry Hudson to form the popular duo "Kirkby and Hudson". They entertained audiences with their eclectic mix of songs and humour well into the 1920s. Kirkby became especially well known for his concert party performances at The Oval, Margate in Kent.

Kirkby was a prolific recording artist and has been credited with making the largest number of records in Britain from the 1900s to the 1930s. Although he was among the first to record roles in Gilbert and Sullivan operas, much of his recorded output was popular songs, the subject matter of which ranged from the topical to the comic. He was one of the highest paid recording artists of his time.

In the mid-1920s he was a joint theatrical producer of a burlesque revue. In the 1930s he broadcast on BBC Radio variety shows. He was a founder member of an early British record company which produced Clarion cylinders.

== Early years and personal life ==
Stanley Kirkby (pronounced Kir-k-by) was born in Ancoats, Manchester, England, in the last quarter of 1878 (Note: There are two possible dates for Kirkby's (James Baker's) birth in Manchester (Lancashire): 1878 (Oct to Dec) or 1880 (Apr to Jun). It was customary in early British censuses to estimate the year of birth given the age at last birthday. With census day being in March/April from 1881 onwards, Kirkby's age was estimated at: 2 in 1881, 13 in 1891, 22 in 1901 and 32 in 1911. So a birth date of the last quarter of 1878 fits best with most of these estimates; 1880 with none of them. It also fits best with his known accurate date of death on 30 October 1949 and age at death of 70 – with his 70th birthday most likely to have been in November or December 1948.) as James Baker (Note: The name James Baker appears to have been used for affairs relating to his personal life, e.g. census details and marriage certificate, while he used Stanley Kirkby as his professional name. However at some point he must have permanently adopted the name Stanley Kirkby as this is what appears on his death certificate.) to George Baker, an iron moulder and his wife Margaret Kirkby. He was a cousin of the contralto opera singer Louise Kirkby Lunn (born 1873). In 1891 at the age of 12 he was working as a warehouse boy in Manchester; his father was no longer present in the household and both his mother and sister had entered the confectionery trade. By 1901 the family was running a confectionery shop and living in Oldham Street in Manchester; his mother was no longer present in the household and Kirkby was working as a tobacco packer.

Oxford Road, Manchester, c. 1900 – with the Palace Theatre (foreground right) and St. James's Hall beyond (with clock tower).

All Saints Church, Chorlton-on-Medlock, Manchester, early 1900s. (Note: All Saints church was badly damaged during the Manchester Blitz in the Second World War. It was demolished in the late 1940s.)

From around 1900 Kirkby was being engaged to sing at local events in Manchester, for example he was a soloist in the sacred service for Lifeboat Saturday – a fund-raising event which was held at the Palace Theatre of Varieties in 1900. In 1901 at the age of 22 he won first prize as a baritone singer in a contest held as part of the Music Trades exhibition at St. James's Hall, Oxford Road in Manchester. On Easter Day 1902 he sang "The Trumpet Shall Sound" from Handel's Messiah in All Saint's Church Chorlton-on-Medlock in Manchester.

In the early 1900s Kirkby performed at a number of provincial events, for example singing a small role in the Edwardian musical comedy The Geisha in Derby in late 1902, and in July 1903 he performed in an outdoor concert "The Pierrots" at the Sydney Gardens in Bath, Somerset – the Bath Chronicle commented: "Mr. Stanley Kirkby has a capital baritone voice".

Kirkby moved to London. There in 1908 he married the singer Jessie Jolly who had been performing with him in one of his concert parties. They had three sons. By the 1911 census he was living in Barnes, London with his wife and his first son, and his profession was given as that of a vocalist. He was rejected for military service in the army for the First World War. He died on 30 October 1949, at his Barnes residence, aged 70.

== Stage career ==
Kirkby began his stage career in the music halls of London's West End, for example appearing in 1905 at The Metropolitan Music Hall on the same billing as the music-hall star Marie Lloyd; however his style soon evolved, with his appearance at the London Coliseum as part of a group called the "Quaint 'Uns" in 1911. The Stage magazine commented:

Stanley Kirkby's "Quaint 'Uns" are newcomers this week, and quickly get on good terms with the audience, in spite of the fact that the exigencies of time preclude anything more than an opening chorus and two concerted numbers. The first quaint thing one notices about the "Quaint 'Uns" is their costume. This has the appearance of a made-to-measure pyjama suit of blue material with white Peter Pan or Quaker cuffs and collars. The party look very smart and original, and their work is quite in keeping with their appearance, the singing being good ...

Concert party, c. 1910. Kirkby and Jessie Jolly, seated. (Note: Stanley Kirkby concert party. From left to right, back row: Emilie Hayes, Bernard Turner, Jimmy Godden; middle row: Jack Lennol; front row: Stanley Kirkby, Jessie Jolly.)

From about 1910, Kirkby became a pioneer of summer entertainment at The Oval in Margate where he performed with his concert parties. In 1910 his party comprised: Emily Hayes, (Note: The wife of music-hall star G. H. Elliott.) Jessie Jolly, Bernard Turner, Mr. L. Lennol and Jimmy Godden; over the succeeding years, the members of this group were to vary. (Note: Other people in Kirkby's concert parties over the years were: Frederick Arthur; Ben Calvert; Bromley Carter; John E. Conan; Lucy France; Edith Lorraine; Kathleen Severn; Elsie Steadman; Eustace Wallace; Fred Wildon.) The artists would typically perform at Margate during the summer season, returning to the music halls and variety theatres of London and the provinces during the winter months.

Kirkby's shows set a standard that was upheld for many years by himself and his successors. In one of his shows (in 1915) was Harry Hudson and their association with its mix of songs and humour resulted in a partnership that gained great popularity as a music-hall act in the 1920s. In 1916 The Stage magazine gave the following review of an early concert resulting from their collaboration:

Popular newcomers to the bill this week are Stanley Kirkby and Harry Hudson who are making their first appearance in the West End in a double turn. They score one of the hits of the programme with syncopated harmony ... Both gentlemen possess fine voices and we thus get ragtime sung artistically and not shouted ... Altogether the duo are to be congratulated upon the excellence of their performance.

The names of Kirkby and Hudson provided a top-line attraction for many years and they made great capital out of songs specially written for them by Weston and Lee. During the latter part of the First World War and for several years afterwards they toured music halls as a double act, though the discographer Brian Rust did not consider any of these songs to be music-hall in style. Several of the songs were recorded for Edison Bell between 1916 and 1925.

In 1925 Kirkby shared the theatrical production of a sixteen-scene burlesque revue called Apple Sauce, with the O'Gorman Brothers. This was based on a book by Will Wise, Fred Pattison and the O'Gorman Brothers, with songs by Lawrence Wright, and Weston and Lee. The show opened at the Royal Hippodrome in Eastbourne, and following its opening night on 30 March 1925, The Stage magazine remarked:

Rarely has such long-sustained applause greeted the fall of the curtain on any revue at this house as was the case ... when "Apple Sauce" thanks to the smart production work of the Brothers O'Gorman went without the slightest hitch, and scored an emphatic success.

During the summer of 1928, after several years absence, Kirkby returned to direct concert parties at Margate for at least one season.

== Recordings ==
Kirkby must be regarded as one of the most prolific of all recording artists in the United Kingdom, making many records under a variety of pseudonyms as well as his own name, for every record label, during the first three decades of the 20th century. Some have even credited him with making the largest number of records in Britain from the 1900s to the 1930s; others that he shares this title with the singer Peter Dawson. Although Kirkby was among the first to record roles in Gilbert and Sullivan operas, he was primarily a highly popular ballad singer with his output containing a high proportion of sentimental ballads as well as patriotic items and a small amount of comic material.

Kirkby was considered a star performer and, according to Joe Batten, the pioneer recording manager, was also very well paid; between 1909 and 1918 earning £90 per week (£8,979 in 2025 adjusted for inflation) to record six titles (normally three hours' work), but as he was freelance and doing similar work for two other companies at the same time, (Note: Kirkby would often record the same song with more than one record company.) he could earn as much as £270 in a week (£26,936 in 2025 adjusted for inflation).

He used the following pseudonyms for His Master's Voice: Charles Holland (often abbreviated Chas. Holland), (Note: Recordings under this pseudonym are sometimes wrongly attributed to American tenor singer Charles Holland (1909–1987).) Walter Miller, Murray Johnson, (Note: This pseudonym was also used by Harry Fay.) Fred Cooper, George Dent, Rupert Hazell, (Note: According to the "AHRC Research Centre for the History and Analysis of Recorded Music", Rupert Hazell is a pseudonym for Stanley Kirkby – the Kelly directory having c. 1500 entries for this. However, Rupert Hazell was apparently also used by a comedian during roughly the same time period.) Gerald Orme, Jim Donovan, Frank Williams, George Daly, George Claff, Sam Ireland, Frank Ashton and Mike Magee; he was the Walker in "Cobbett & Walker" (with Ernest Pike). He is known to have used the following pseudonyms for Edison Bell: Frank Miller, Walter Miller and Frank Emerson. He also used the pseudonyms Stanley Barnes (Scala), F. Elliot (Scala), Keith James (Edison Bell Radio) and Charles Lester (Polyphon).

Kirkby recorded well over 200 tracks for the "Gramophone & Typewriter Company" (G&T) and its associated labels: His Master's Voice, Zonophone and Victor. Much of his recorded output from about 1912 was for Edison Bell (Winner, Velvet Face and Radio labels), and it is this label with which he became particularly, but not exclusively associated. He recorded Clarion cylinders from about 1907, (Note: For example Clarion cylinder no: 5 "I'm Wearing My Heart Away for You") 4-minute Edison cylinders from 1911 and Pathé etched-label discs from 1913. His recordings were also released on the following record labels: Beka, Beta, Coliseum, Columbia, Empire, Favorite, John Bull, Jumbo, Lyceum, Regal and Scala. (Note: The following is a list of example records for each of the record labels on which Kirkby's songs were released: Beka record no: 512 "Kitty Dear"; Beta record no: 3331 "How 'Ya Gonna Keep 'em Down on the Farm"; Coliseum record no: 145 "Silver Bell"; Columbia Rena record no: 1506 "Don't Go Down in the Mine, Dad"; Empire record no: 1511 "Beautiful Garden of Roses"; Favorite record no: 828 "Tip-top Tipperary Mary"; John Bull record no: B49 "Sweet Jenny Gray"; Jumbo record no: A423 "Till the Boys Come Home"; Lyceum record no: 69 "Silver Bell"; Regal record no: G6795 "Boys in Khaki, Boys in Blue"; Scala record no: 609 "It's a Long Way to Tipperary") Over forty of his records were included in the 1912 Ariel Grand record catalogue.

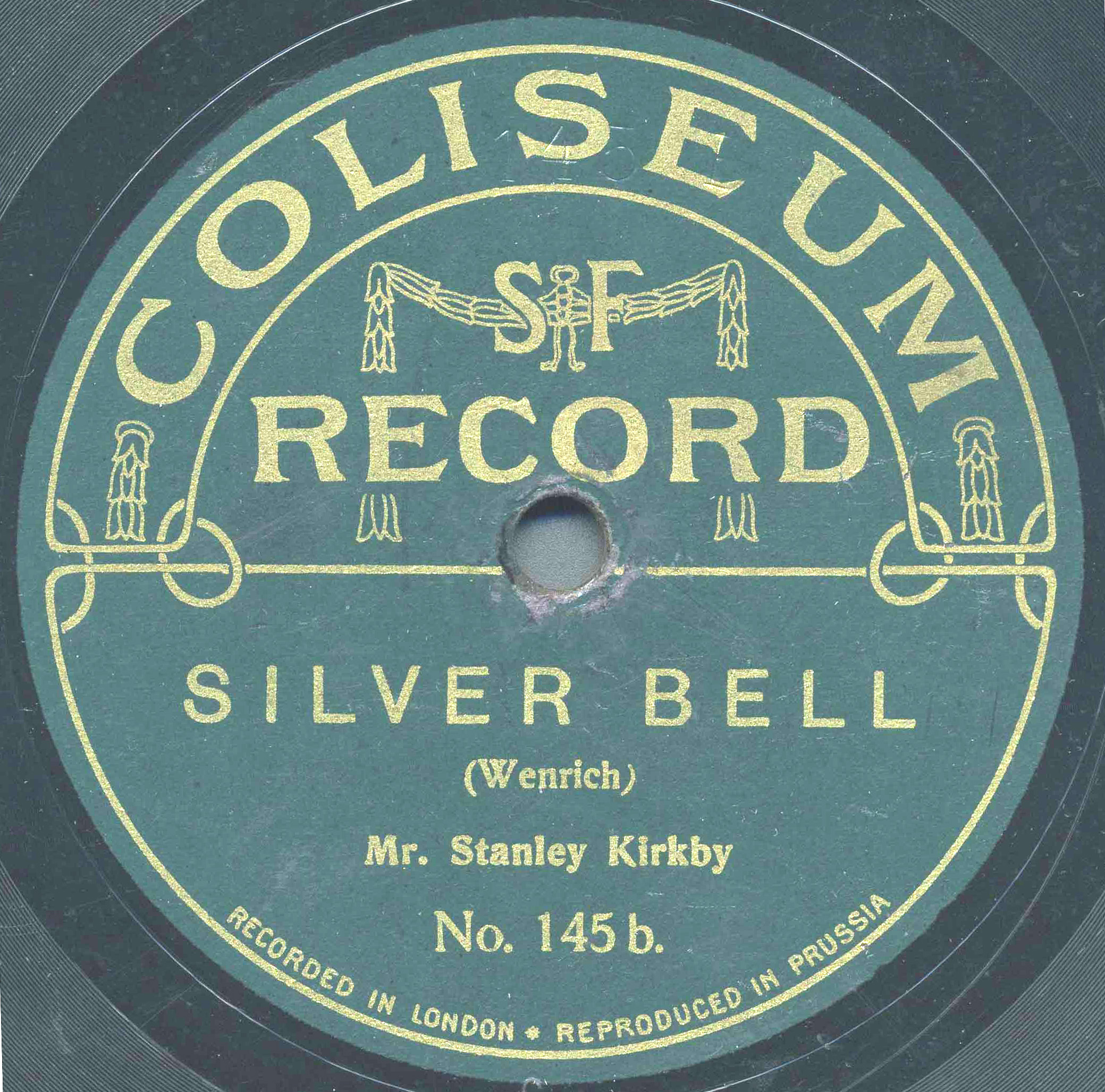
Record label for "Silver Bell" on Coliseum (above) and "Tipperary" on Scala (below)

=== Early recordings ===
Kirkby started to record as early as 1903 for G&T, but some of these very early tracks were not issued; one of the earliest with a catalogue number was "The Village Blacksmith" (by Willoughby Weiss) recorded on 27 April 1904. He recorded ballads and songs typical of the Edwardian era. A selection of these recorded for Zonophone is given below with the year of recording and any pseudonym used:

- "Violets", 1907
- "The Miner's Dream of Home", 1906 (as Charles Holland), 1907 (as Kirkby with Denise Orme as May Loveday)
- "Father O' Flynn", 1907
- "A Sergeant of the Line", 1910
- "Silver Bell", 1910
- "I Hear You Calling Me", 1916 (as Rupert Hazell)

He also recorded songs of a more humorous nature. Here is a selection with the year of recording, record company and any pseudonym used:

- "We All Walked into the Shop", 1905, G&T, (as Walter Miller)
- "Go Away, Mr. Crocodile", 1906, Zonophone, (as Walter Miller)
- "I'll Tell Tilly on the Telephone", 1907, Zonophone, (as Walter Miller assisted by Miss Topsy May "The Original Tilly")
- "She's a Lassie From Lancashire", 1908, Zonophone, (as Walter Miller)
- "The Galloping Major", 1907 and 1912, Zonophone, (as Walter Miller)
- "Yiddle, on Your Fiddle", 1912, Edison Bell Winner, (as Stanley Kirkby)
- "You Can Do a Lot of Things at the Seaside", 1912, Scala, (as Stanley Barnes) (Note: Scala record no: 181)

=== Gilbert and Sullivan recordings ===
Kirkby sang in some of the earliest recordings made of Gilbert and Sullivan operas, commencing in December 1906, by singing Pish-Tush and part or all of the roles of Ko-Ko and Pooh-Bah in the first recording of The Mikado for G&T. This was initially released on single-sided gramophone records and then re-released on double-sided discs in 1912. In 1907 he sang Jack Point in The Yeomen of the Guard also for G&T. Also in 1907 he made a number of recordings as part of a chorus called "The Sullivan Operatic Party" for both The Yeomen of the Guard and The Gondoliers, again for G&T. In 1908 he sang Captain Corcoran in the G&T recording of excerpts from H.M.S. Pinafore. In 1912 he sang The Mikado, Pooh-Bah and parts of Ko-Ko for the Edison Bell recording of highlights from The Mikado.

=== Topical events ===
Kirkby made a number of recordings about the topical events of his time, for example in 1910 "Don't Go Down in the Mine, Dad" – a song said to have been written in response to the great 1907 mining disaster at St. Genard in South Wales and in 1913 "Be British!" – a memorial song to raise funds for the families of the victims of the Titanic disaster. Also in 1913 he made a famous recording about Scott's Antarctic Expedition "'Tis a Story That Shall Live For Ever". He recorded First World War songs both popular and propaganda, for example "We Didn't Want to Fight but By Jingo Now We Do" and "Your King and Country Want You" for Edison Bell Winner; he also recorded "It's a Long Way to Tipperary" for Zonophone (also released on Regal and Scala). Following the War one of his greatest hits was "The Rose of No Man's Land" which sold a total of 163,000 copies; it had become very popular with men returning home to civilian life from the Front in France.

=== Collaborations ===
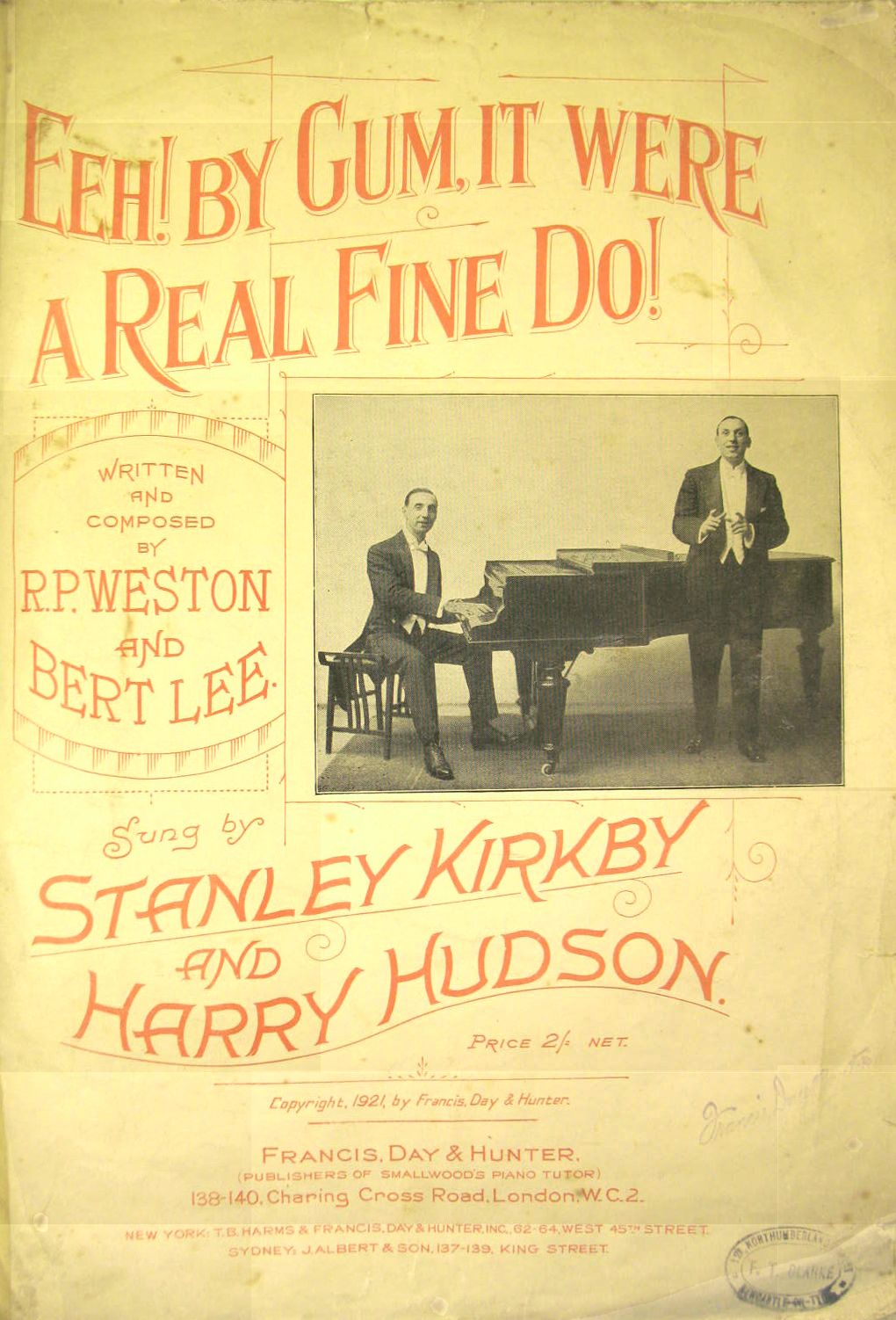
Sheet music for "Eeh! By Gum ..." c. 1921. Kirkby (standing) and Hudson.

Kirkby collaborated with other artists at His Master's Voice, for example with Ernest Pike in "When You Wore a Tulip" in 1916 (as Cobbett and Walker) and "She Sells Sea Shells on the Seashore" in 1908 (as Fred Cooper with Herbert Payne). (Note: Herbert Payne was one of Ernest Pike's pseudonyms.) He recorded duets with female singers, for example with Denise Orme in "The Kissing Duet" from The Geisha, and with the music-hall star Florrie Forde in "Would You Like to Change With Me?", both in 1906. His collaborations with artists for other record companies included one with the contralto Jessie Broughton in "If You Were the Only Girl in the World" in c. 1916 for Scala. (Note: Scala record no: 862)

Occasionally he would form part of a backing group or chorus in the His Master's Voice recording studio known as "The Minster Singers" along with some or all of the following: Ernest Pike, Peter Dawson and Arthur Gilbert; sometimes there were additional singers in this group. The Minster Singers also recorded songs in its own right, for example "Christmas Eve in the Old Homestead" in 1907. He was in the Zonophone church hymn singing ensemble "A Church Choir", recording "Onward, Christian Soldiers" in 1909 along with Eleanor Jones-Hudson, Ernest Pike, Harold Wilde and A. H. Gee.

=== Post War ===
Between 1916 and 1925 Kirkby and Hudson recorded a number of songs resulting from their stage collaboration, for Edison Bell Winner, for example: "Somebody Would Shout Out 'Shop'" (1916), "The Body in the Bag" (1920) and "Eeh! By Gum, It Were a Real Fine Do!" (1922). He continued to record from the late 1920s to the early 1930s on the 8-inch Edison Bell Radio electrically recorded series, for example: "Are You Lonesome Tonight?", "Don't Do That to the Poor Puss Cat", "Hot Pot" and one of the last of the series recorded in 1931: "I'm the Last One Left on the Corner". (Note: Edison Bell Radio (EBR) record numbers are as follows: "Are You Lonesome Tonight" is EBR 826 – this was recorded more than 30 years before the well-known recording by Elvis Presley.; "Don't Do That to the Poor Puss Cat" is EBR 862.; "Hot Pot" is EBR 908.; "I'm the Last One Left on the Corner" is EBR 1501.)

== Singing voice ==
In his memoirs, Joe Batten said of Kirkby's voice:

A Clarion cylinder box.

He had the finest recording voice of all the artistes I have heard in recording studios. It was a pure baritone. His diction was perfect, and he had a versatility in interpretation that distinguished him from all others.

The Ariel record catalogue from 1912 stated:

[Stanley Kirkby is] the fortunate possessor of a rich and powerful baritone voice ...

== Broadcasts ==
During the 1930s Kirkby broadcast on BBC radio variety shows, for example in 1933 he took part in a "Memories" programme which included Fred Wildon and Philip Ritte among others, and was presented by Harry Hudson. (Note: Hudson was by now working for Edison Bell and had his own orchestra "Harry Hudson and his Melody Men".) In 1935 he appeared in "Out of Town Tonight" a variety programme which was compered by Dave Burnaby and included the comedian Tommy Handley, Hudson again and the BBC Variety Orchestra.

== Business interests ==
Kirkby was one of the founder members of the British record company "Premier Manufacturing Co. Ltd." which was incorporated in 1905 and produced Clarion cylinders from about 1907. (Note: Premier Manufacturing Co. Ltd. is used for a completely unrelated purpose today.) The company folded in 1910, but re-emerged as the "Clarion Record Co. Ltd."; it continued to trade until about 1922.

== Notes and references ==
Notes

== Listen to Kirkby sing ==
You can use the following links to listen to a selection of some of the songs that Kirkby sang:

- "The Galloping Major" on YouTube – (recorded in 1907 & 1912)
- "She's a Lassie From Lancashire" on YouTube – (recorded in 1908)
- "Be British!" Titanic memorial on YouTube – (recorded in 1913)
- "Your King and Country Want You" on YouTube – (recorded in c. 1914)
- "Tit Willow" from The Mikado on YouTube – (recorded in c. 1920)
- "Are You Lonesome Tonight" on YouTube – (recorded in 1928)
