= Ritte =

Ritte may refer to:

- Ritte Cycles, an American bicycle manufacturer
- Řetůvka (German: Ritte), a village and municipality in the Pardubice Region of the Czech Republic
- Philip Ritte, a British tenor (1871-1954)
- Walter Ritte, a Native Hawaiian activist and educator (born 1945)
