= Galloping Major =

Galloping Major can refer to:

- The Galloping Major (film), a 1951 British comedy about horse racing
- "The Galloping Major" (song), a popular song originally performed in 1906 by George Henry Bastow and covered by Stanley Kirkby in 1910
- nickname of Hungarian footballer and manager Ferenc Puskás
- nickname of Ronald Ferguson (polo), father of Sarah Ferguson, Duchess of York

== See also ==
- Galloping Major scandal, a 1980s stock exchange scandal
