= I Hear You Calling Me =

- Original sheet music, 1908

Song
- Published: 1908
- Composer: Charles Marshall
- Lyricist: Harold Lake

"I Hear You Calling Me" is a British popular song published in London in 1908 by Boosey & Co. The lyrics were by Harold Lake (a journalist writing as Harold Harford) and the music by Charles Marshall (1857-1957). The song became a signature song for the tenor John McCormack.

== Background ==
Harold Lake had been a great friend of Harry Dearth, the ballad singer, from when they had been in the choir school of Westminster Abbey together. Dearth had urged Lake to try to write lyrics, but it was not until some years after, that "I Hear You Calling Me" was written. Lake explained that behind the events which led up to its composition lay a story of youthful romance:

A 16-year-old pupil teacher at an elementary school in Canterbury met a girl nearly a year his junior. Then followed three years of utter devotion as only the very young can know, then a fortnight of galloping consumption, and a lad of 19 standing on a November day grave.

Six years later, Lake woke up one morning and the words came to him; they were written in 20 minutes. He was reported to have sold the song for a few pounds, but made a fortune from the sale of its gramophone recordings.

Charles Marshall, born in Yorkshire, was an organist, professor of music and composer of songs, church music and chamber music. He visited the tenor John McCormack at his lodgings and played him his setting of the lyrics. McCormack started to sing it, and soon became enthusiastic. He suggested that they should visit Mr. Arthur Boosey as he would be sure to publish it.

The song became a bestseller for McCormack and helped to start him on the road to success. He recorded it six times in total, twice for Odeon and four times for Victor. The song became so closely identified with him that his wife Lily adopted it as the title of her biography of him.

== Lyrics ==
The following lyrics are taken from the sheet music published in 1908:

Postcard with the words from verse 2. c. 1915

Verse 1:

I hear you calling me.
You called me when the moon had veiled her light,
Before I went from you into the night;
I came, – do you remember? – back to you
For one last kiss beneath the kind stars' light.

Verse 2:

I hear you calling me.
And oh, the ringing gladness of your voice!
The words that made my longing heart rejoice
You spoke, – do you remember? – and my heart
Still hears the distant music of your voice.

Verse 3:

I hear you calling me.
Though years have stretched their weary length between,
And on your grave the mossy grass is green:
I stand, – do you behold me? – listening here,
Hearing your voice through all the years between.

== Recordings ==
Below is a list of artists who have recorded the song with the recording date and record information (where known):

- John McCormack, Odeon: twice in 1908. Victor: 1910, 1911, 1921 and 1927
- Ernest Pike, 1909, His Master's Voice
- Evan Williams, 1909, Victor
- Frank Webster, 1914, His Master's Voice
- Stanley Kirkby (as Rupert Hazell), 1916, His Master's Voice (Zonophone)
- Sydney MacEwan, 1954, Columbia
- Jonathan Richman, Back in Your Life, 1979
- Trevor Alexander (baritone), Peter Crockford (piano), 2023

== Listen to the song ==
You can use the following links to listen to the song being sung by:

- John McCormack in 1908: Play video on YouTube
- John McCormack in 1911: Play video on YouTube
- John McCormack in 1927: Play video on YouTube
- Sydney MacEwan: Play video on YouTube
