= Po dikim stepyam Zabaikalya =

Russian folk song

Song by Nadezhda Plevitskaya
- Language: Russian
- English title: By the Wild Steppes of Transbaikalia
- Published: 1908
- Released: 1909
- Genre: Russian folk
- Label: Beka
- Lyricist: Ivan Kondratyev

Audio
- Rendition by the Pyatnitsky Choir: file; help

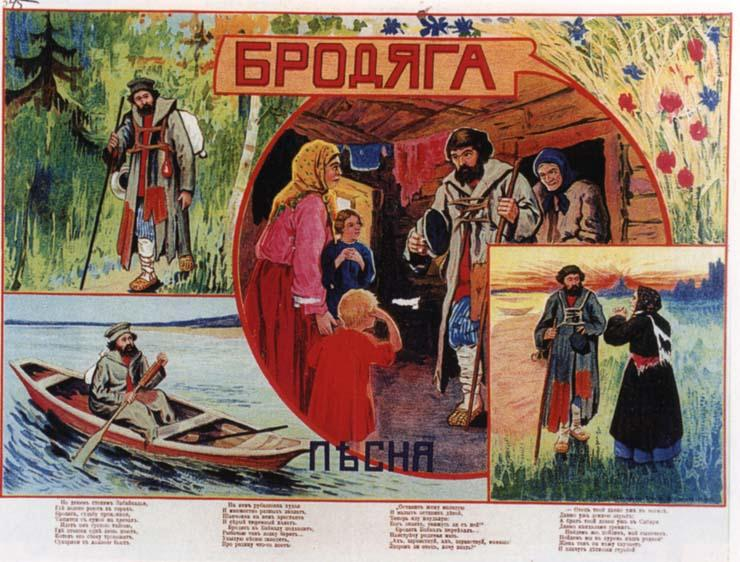
Song Brodiaga (Po dikim stepyam Zabaikalya)

"Po dikim stepyam Zabaikalya" (Russian: По диким степям Забайкалья, lit. 'By the wild Steppes of the Transbaikalia') is a Russian folk song, also known as "Brodyaga" (Russian: Бродяга, lit. 'tramp, vagabond'). It was published and recorded at the beginning of the 20th century and has since become part of the repertoire of various Russian and foreign artists.

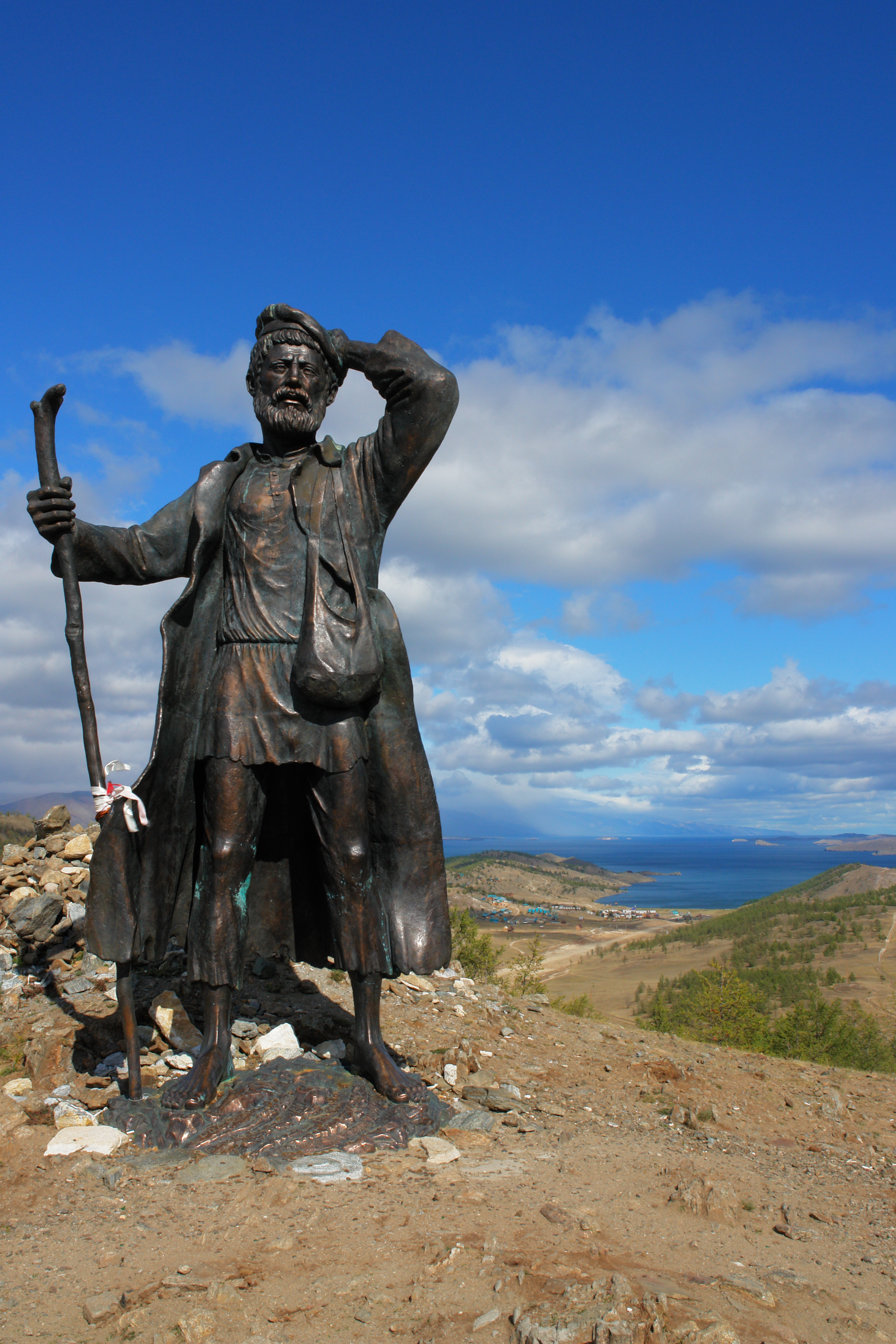
The monument to the hero of the song in Olkhonsky District of Irkutsk oblast

== History ==
According to popular belief, the song was composed by convicts in Siberia towards the end of the 19th century. The revolutionary Ivan Belokonsky insisted, though, that it was known in Siberia in the 1880s, but there was no indication of the author of the lyrics.

According to Ivan Nazarov (and Alexander Smolik), Ivan Kondratyev was the author of the lyrics, although the poem is not included in the latter's last published volume of poems, Under the noise of the Oak Groves. In 1906, Swedish composer Wilhelm Harteveld also collected the song during his trip to Siberia and published it in 1908.

In the early 20th century, several recordings of the song were made in Russia:

- Brodyaga (From the songs of convicts) performed by Nadezhda Plevitskaya and released by Pathé Records in Moscow, 1908.
- Brodyaga (From the songs of convicts) also performed by Nadezhda Plevitskaya; Beka Records, Moscow, 1909.
- Brodyaga (From the songs of convicts), performed by Nina Dulkevich (Russian: Нина Викторовна Дулькевич), Pathé Records, 1912. 21, исп. Нина Дулькевич.

All these releases credit Ivan Kondratyev as the author of the lyrics.

== Lyrics ==
There are several versions, which differ slightly in words or expressions. Most musicians omit some verses. The following is the most common version. (The verses in italics are those most often omitted):

Russian	Transliteration	English translation
1 По диким степям Забайкалья, Где золото роют в горах, Бродяга, судьбу проклиная, Тащился с сумой на плечах. 2 Идёт он густою тайгою, Где пташки одни лишь поют, Котел его сбоку тревожит, Сухие коты ноги бьют. 3 На нем рубашонка худая, И множество разных заплат, Шапчонка на нем арестанта И серый тюремный халат. 4 Бежал из тюрьмы тёмной ночью, В тюрьме он за правду страдал. Идти дальше нет уже мочи – Пред ним расстилался Байкал. 5 Бродяга к Байкалу подходит, Рыбацкую лодку берёт И грустную песню заводит, Про Родину что-то поёт. 6 "Оставил жену молодую И малых оставил детей, Теперь я иду наудачу, Бог знает, увижусь ли с ней!" 7 Бродяга Байкал переехал, Навстречу - родимая мать. "Ах, здравствуй, ах, здравствуй, мамаша, Здоров ли отец мой да брат?" 8 "Отец твой давно уж в могиле, Землею сырою лежит, А брат твой давно уж в Сибири, Давно кандалами гремит." 9 "Пойдём же, пойдём, мой сыночек, Пойдём же в курень наш родной, Жена там по мужу скучает, И плачут детишки гурьбой."	1 Po dikim stepyam Zabaikalya, Gde zoloto royut v gorakh, Brodyaga, sudbu proklinaya, Tashilsya s sumoi na plechakh. 2 Idyot on gustoyu taigoyu, Gde ptashki odni lish poyut, Kotel ego sboku trevozhit, Sukhie koty nogi byut. 3 Na niom rubashonka khudaya, I mnozhestvo rasnykh zaplat, Shapchonka na nem arestsanta И seryi tyuremnyi khalat. 4 Bezhal iz tyurmy tyomnoi nochyu, V tyurme on za pravdu stradal. Idti dalshe net uzhe mochi – Pred nim rasstilalsya Baikal. 5 Brodyaga k Baikalu podkhodit, Rybatzkuyu lodku beryot I grustnuyu pesnyu zavodit Pro Rodinu chto-to poyot. 6 "Оstavil zhenu moloduyu I malykh ostavil detei, Teper ya idu naudachu, Bog znayet, uvizhus li s nei!" 7 Brodyaga Baikal pereyekhal, Navstrechu - rodimaya mat. "Аkh, zdravstvuy, аkh zdravstvuy, mamasha, Zdorov li otets moi i brat?" 8 "Otets tvoi davno uzh v mogile Zemlioyu syroyu lezhit А brat tvoi davno uzh v Sibiri, Davno kandalami gremit." 9 "Poidyom zhe, poidyom, moi synochek Poidyom zhe kuren nash rodnoi Zhena tam po muzhu skuchayet, Plachut detishki gurboi."	1 On the wild steppes of Transbaikalia, Where people dig for gold in the mountains, A vagrant, bemoaning his fate, Is wandering with a bag on his back. 2 He walks through the thick taiga, Where only a few birds sing, He carries a tin can on his side, His feet are strapped in dry skins. 3 He wears a worn-out shirt And a lot of different patches. The cap on his head is a convict’s cap And he wears a grey convict’s uniform. 4 He escaped from prison during a dark night Where he was imprisoned for defending the truth. But he could not go any further In front of him was Lake Baikal. 5 The vagrant walks to the shore And climbs in to a fisherman's boat. He starts to sing a sad song Telling something about his native land. 6 "I left my wife when she was young And left her with my small children, Now I wander aimlessly, God knows, whether I shall meet her again!" 7 He crosses the lake, His mother comes to meet him. ”O my dear mother let me embrace you, Are my father and my brother well?” 8 "Your father has been dead for a long time; He now rests in the damp earth. And your brother is serving his sentence, Wearing chains, somewhere in Siberia." 9 "Let's go, let’s go, my son, Let's go home to our house, Where your wife misses her husband, And all your little children are crying."

== Recent performances ==
External videos
- Po dikim stepyam Zabaikalya. The Pyatnitsky Choir. The Centenary Concert at the Chaykovsky Concert Hall, 9 March 2011

The song remains in the repertoire of various Russian artists. The best known performances include those by:

- Pyatnitsky Choir (numerous versions)
- The Siberian Russian Folk Choir (Russian: Сибирский русский народный хор) conducted by V. Molchalov, soloist Yelena Ponomaryova.
- Voronezh Russian Folk Choir
- Aleksandr Mikhaylov
- Yuri Sorokin (1980s)
- Zhanna Bichevskaya
- Andrey Makarevich (1996)
- Mongol Shuudan (2004)
- Chaif (2009)

== Performance abroad ==
The first recording outside the USSR was by Electrecord in Bucharest, Romania in 1945 and released as "Brodyaga". It was performed by Pyotr Leshchenko, a Russian singer who had emigrated to Romania.

The song has also been performed by foreign artists, including:

- Czesław Niemen (Poland)
- Bernard Ładysz (Poland)
- Jaroslaw Jaromi Drazewski (Poland)
- Artur Gadowski (Poland)
- Piotr Celiński (Poland)
- Baltie Lāči group (Latvia)
- Zivan Saramandic (Serbia)
- Zura Pirveli (Georgia)

== Films ==
The song was featured in the Russian movie Ballad of Siberia (Russian: Сказание о земле Сибирской), performed by actor Vladimir Druzhnikov, being a secondary theme song.

== Spinoffs ==
A parody of the song called "On the wild steppes of Arizona" (Russian: По диким степям Аризоны), with lyrics by Viktor Baranov performed by Artur Gladyshev. The song was released in 1997 in the album "Red America" (Russian: Квасная Америка) .

== See also ==
- "Glorious Sea, Sacred Baikal"
