= Jessie Broughton =

English singer and actress (1885–1938)

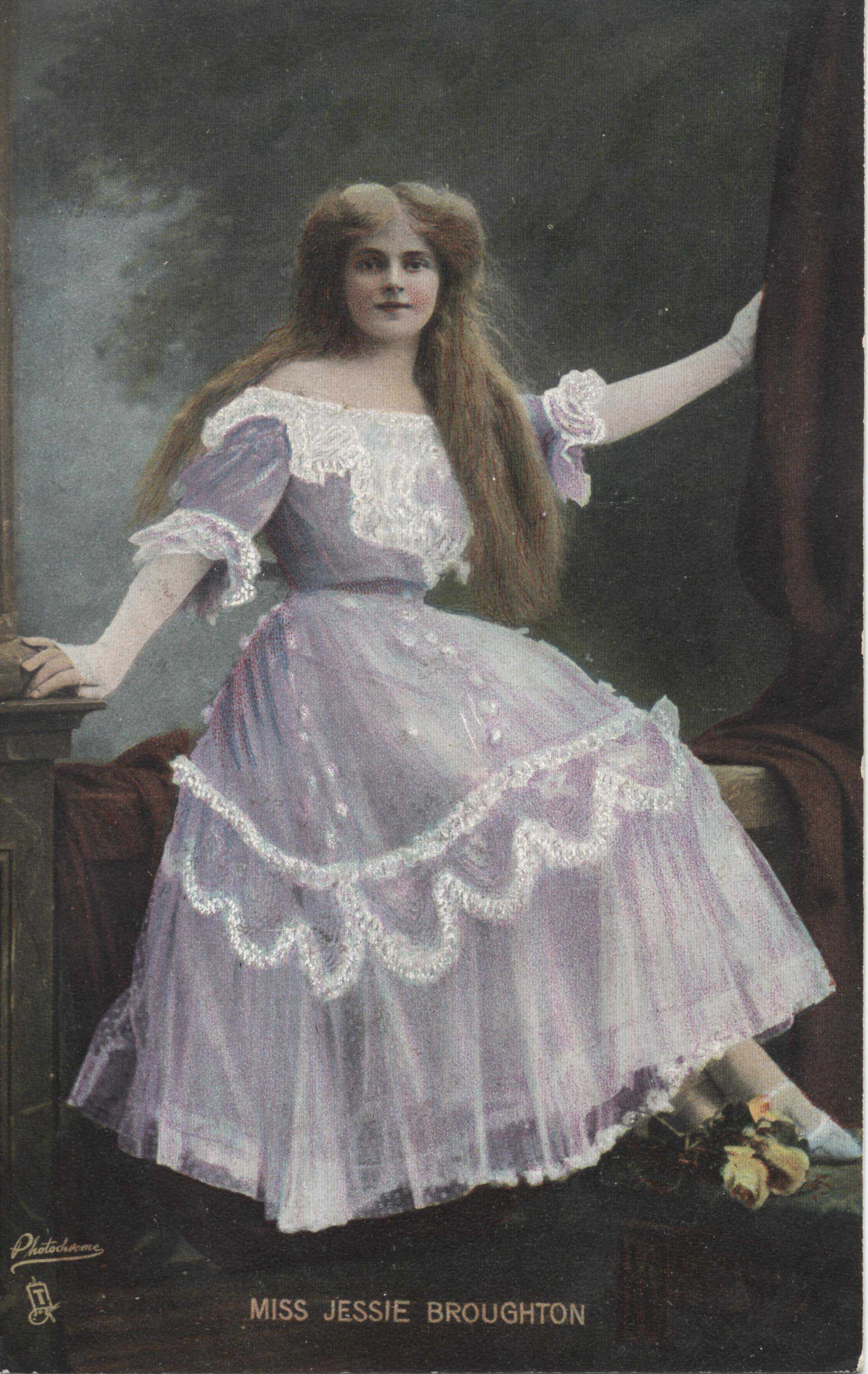
Jessie Broughton: A hand-tinted publicity photo probably taken in the early 1900s.

Jessie Broughton (29 March 1885 – 1938) was an English contralto and actress. She made her stage debut at the Apollo Theatre in London in 1903 and soon appeared in Véronique, Havana and A Waltz Dream in the West End. In 1910, she married, and with her husband she performed in London and toured Britain and abroad in variety and music hall, and made recordings, until the 1930s.

== Early life and career ==
Broughton was born in Hackney, London, as Jessie Broughton Black, the daughter of Broughton Black, an actor who had performed with the D'Oyly Carte Opera Company. She used the stage name Jessie Broughton and for recordings sometimes used the pseudonym Agnes Preston.

She was a voice pupil of Madame Oudin and also studied the piano.

== Stage career ==
In 1903 she was engaged by the theatre manager George Edwardes to appear at the Apollo Theatre in London's West End. Her first role there was in the musical The Girl from Kays in 1903, subsequently appearing at the same theatre in Madame Sherry. In 1904 she appeared again at the Apollo in the small role of Irma in Véronique. During the 1905–6 season she performed as a solo vocalist at the Empire Theatre. In 1908 she appeared as Zara in Havana at the Gaiety Theatre and, in the same year, she appeared as Friedrike in A Waltz Dream at the Hicks Theatre, touring with this production in 1909. She visited America in 1910 as well as appearing in music halls. She also made appearances at Daly's Theatre.

In 1910, Broughton married the tenor and violinist Dennis Creedon. Between 1911 and 1915, she continued to appear at the principal variety houses. During the next twenty years or so, the couple toured and performed in the UK, US, Africa and Australia.

== Recording career ==
Broughton made dozens of records mostly of the sacred or light classical type for the following labels: Scala, Coliseum, Favorite and Homochord. She also made recordings with her husband Dennis Creedon. She was one of the first (in c.1915) to record the song "The Sunshine of Your Smile" which had been written in 1912 by Leonard Cooke and Lilian Ray and which was covered more recently in 1980 by the singer Mike Berry.

She died in Hampstead, London, England in 1938 aged 53.
