= Philip Ritte =

British tenor (1871–1954)

Philip Ritte, early 1900s.

Philip Ritte (8 January 1871 – 14 December 1954) was a British tenor of the early 20th century. He made his stage debut in London's West End singing in Gilbert and Sullivan and other comic operas and musicals. He went on to enjoy great popularity as a concert singer of ballads during the Edwardian era and the First World War, and also as a performer in concert parties at The Oval, Margate in Kent. He made a number of recordings.

== Early years and personal life ==
Philip Ritte was born in Edinburgh, Scotland, in 1871 as Philip Rittenberg, the son of Bernhard Rittenberg (of Lithuanian Jewish descent) and Bertha Wasserzug (of Polish Jewish descent). He was one of seven children. He was educated at Cowper Street School in London and studied art before moving on to study music. In 1899 he married Henrietta Helena "Lillie" Latte; his profession at this time being given as that of a lithographic artist on the marriage certificate. They had four children. In 1918 he changed his name to Philip Ritte.

== Stage and singing career ==
Ritte made his singing debut as a chorister with the D'Oyly Carte Opera Company at the Savoy Theatre from June 1899 to November 1901, beginning with H.M.S. Pinafore and Trial by Jury and ending with the original production of The Emerald Isle. From 1903 to 1904 he played a small part (the First Watchman) in The Cherry Girl at the Vaudeville Theatre in London. From 1904 and for eight years he made annual appearances at the London Ballad concerts held at both the Queen's Hall and Royal Albert Hall. He performed in numerous concerts at most of the leading provincial British theatres. In 1907 he joined "Randall Jackson's Concert Party" at the Oval in Margate in which he had Hugh E. Wright, Carrie Tubb and Fred Wildon as fellow artists, and it was this association which gained him his eventual popularity. For several summers Ritte ran his own companies in the Worthing, Westgate and Swanage areas of the south coast of England. In 1912 the Ariel Grand record catalogue made the following appraisal of his career:

Since his first appearance as a member of the D'Oyly Carte Opera Company, twelve years ago, Mr. Ritte's career has been an uninterrupted success. He has appeared before enthusiastic audiences in all the principal London concert halls and is well known in oratorio in the largest provincial centres.

== Recordings ==
In 1909 Ritte recorded fewer than ten songs for the Gramophone Company's Zonophone label. Between 1910 and 1911 he made a number of recordings for Pathé. He recorded about seven discs for Beka Records, and had nineteen entries in the 1912 Ariel Grand record catalogue. He also recorded for the Albion and Coliseum labels. He used the pseudonym Harold Harmsworth for some of his recordings. A selection of his songs, with recording date (where known) and record company is given below:

- "I'll Take You Home Again, Kathleen", 1909, Zonophone
- "When You and I Were Young, Maggie", 1909, Zonophone
- "Love's Old Sweet Song", 1909, Zonophone
- "The Golden Shore", 1909, Zonophone
- "I Hear You Calling Me", 1910, Pathé
- "Because", Albion
- "Roses of Picardy", Coliseum
- "Kathleen Mavourneen", Beka

In 1927, he made a short film Philip Ritte and His Revellers in the short-lived DeForest Phonofilm sound-on-film process. In 1932 he appeared in a drama movie "Reunion".

== Death ==
He died in Willesden, London, England in 1954, aged 83.
