= Havana (Edwardian musical) =

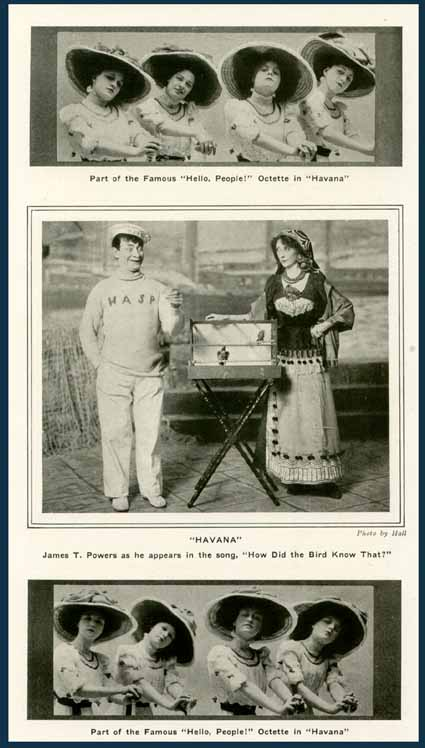
Scenes from the 1909 New York production of Havana

Alfred Lester and Lawrence Grossmith in the original London production

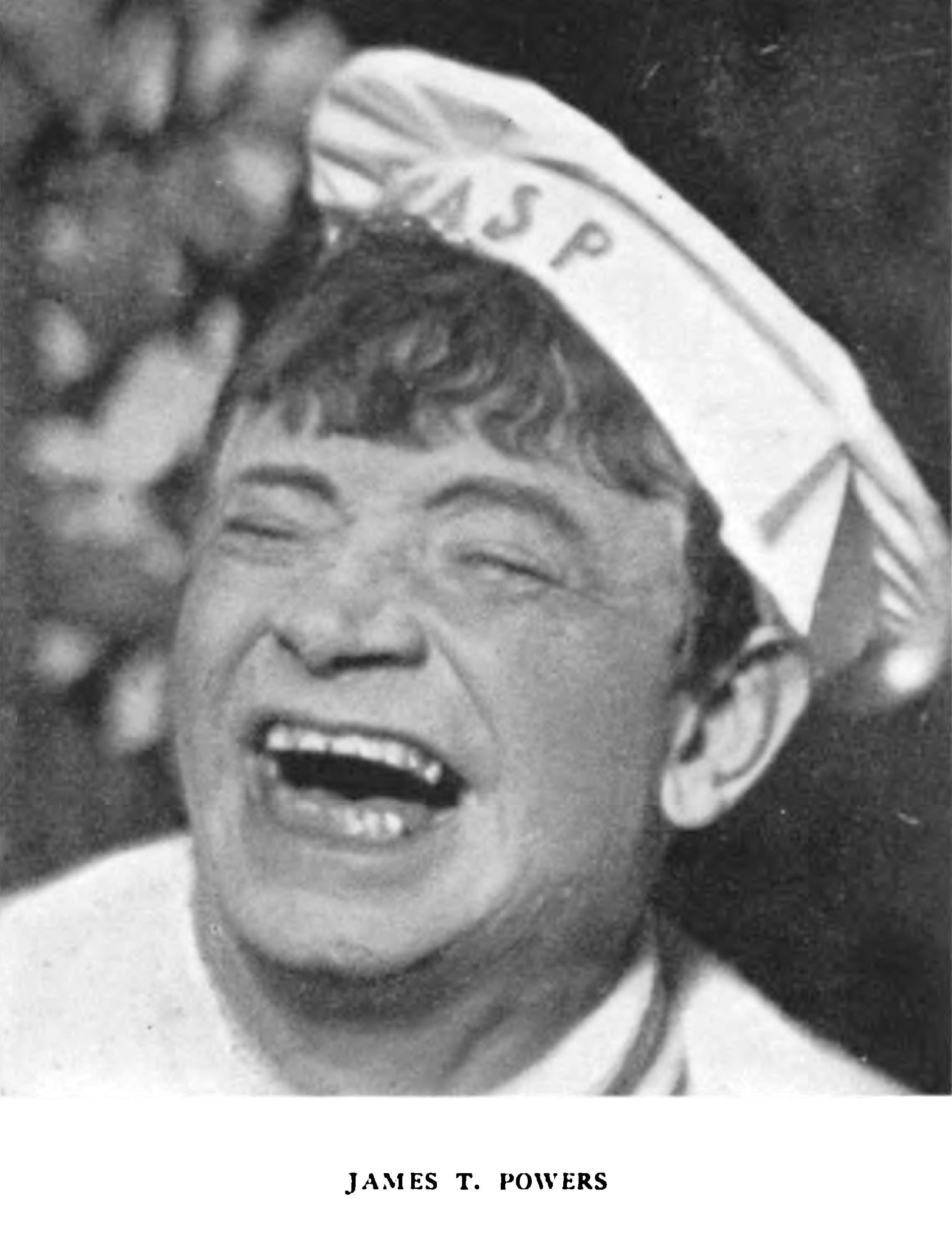
James T. Powers, star of the American production, in 1909

Havana is an Edwardian musical comedy in three acts, with a book by George Grossmith, Jr. and Graham Hill, music by Leslie Stuart, lyrics by Adrian Ross and additional lyrics by George Arthurs. It premiered on 25 April 1908 at the Gaiety Theatre, London, starring Evie Greene as Consuelo, W. H. Berry as Reginald Brown, Lawrence Grossmith as Don Adolfo and Mabel Russell as Pepita. A young Gladys Cooper was in the chorus.

The production ran for 221 performances before touring the provinces. It also soon played in Berlin, Germany. An American production played at the Casino Theatre in New York after a Philadelphia tryout, with revisions by its star, James T. Powers. This production was staged by Ned Wayburn and ran from 11 February 1909 to 25 September 1909 for a total of 236 performances.

Among the show's musical numbers are the songs Little Miquette, Cupid's Telephone, How Did the Bird Know That? and Pensacola. Musical selections from the show were recorded by the Victor Light Opera Company in 1909.

== Roles and original cast ==
- Jackson Villiers (of the Steam Yacht Jaunty June) – Leonard Mackay
- The Hon. Frank Charteris – Robert Hale
- Bombito del Campo (Mayor of Havana) – Arthur Hatherton
- Don Adolfo (his son) – Lawrence Grossmith
- Antonio (Adolfo's valet) – Barry Lupino
- Diego de la Concha – Edward O'Neill
- Nix (bo'sun of the Jaunty June) – Alfred Lester
- Reginald Brown (the yacht's boy) – W. H. Berry
- Anita (a cigar seller) – Jean Aylwin
- Isabelita (Bombito's sister) – Gladys Homfreye
- Tita (chief of the cigar store) – Olive May
- Pepita – Mabel Russell
- Lolita – Adelina Balfe
- Zara – Jessie Broughton
- Newspaper reporter – Gladys Cooper
- Consuelo (Bombito's niece) – Evie Greene

== Synopsis ==
According to The Manchester Guardian: "The plot is slight, and is concerned with Consuelo, the niece of the proprietor of a cigar factory and Mayor of Havana. She is betrothed to her cousin Adolfo, but loves an English yachtsman, Jackson Villiers. He is suspected of participation in the plots of the Red Liberados, so she publicly insults him; but he does not seem to mind much, and all ends well."

== Musical numbers ==
Act I – Cigar Store of Bombito and Co.

- No. 1 – Chorus – 'Tis noon, the noon of tropic day
- No. 2 – Bombito and chorus of girls – If I was a ruler despotical, presumably properly paid
- No. 3 – Anita – Once a sailor man I married, seven years ago today
- No. 4 – Tita, Lolita, Pepita, Bombito, Hilario and Alejandro – There's a yacht in the harbour today
- No. 5 – Consuelo and chorus – I'm a Cuban girl from the island pearl
- No. 6 – Adolfo and girls – Six little girls went on a tour run by a daily print
- No. 7 – Jackson and girls – As I sit on my hammock, smoking and smoking
- No. 8 – Reginald and Nix – When I play the buccaneer I'm a flier, never fear
- No. 9 – Finale Act I – The girl with the yellow roses

Act II – Patio of the Torre del Campo.

- Nos. 10 and 11 – Chorus and Zara – The sun is down and over the town, far above is the star that we love
- No. 12 – Consuelo and girls – Little Miquette, you mustn't forget
- No. 13 – Reginald and chorus – When I was born, my birthmark was a pirate flag of black
- No. 14 – Anita and Reginald – If you go where duty calls, from a station at St. Paul's
- No. 15 – Anita, Pepita, Frank and Reginald – If you see a little bag lying down upon a flag
- No. 16 – Adolfo and chorus of girls – If you desire to see your little girlie
- No. 17 – Frank – When a fellow loves a girl in London Town
- No. 18 – Finale Act II – Welcome to the lovely bride

Act III – The Harbour, Havana.

- No. 19 – Chorus – The morning breaks upon the shore
- No. 20 – Anita and Nix – If you're the dear departed
- No. 21 – Reginald – When I was once a naughty little nipper
- No. 22 – Pepita and chorus – I know there's a little girl that you know
- No. 23 – Consuelo – I know a man who's waiting for me down there by the sea
- No. 24 – Ensemble – girls, will you take a walk for a while?
- No. 25 – Finale Act III – I'm a Cuban girl from the island of pearl
