= Odeon Records =

German multi-national record label

- Founded: 1903; 123 years ago
- Founder: Max Straus; Heinrich Zuntz
- Genre: Various
- Country of origin: Germany
- Location: Berlin

Odeon Records is a record label founded in 1903 by Max Straus and Heinrich Zuntz of the International Talking Machine Company in Berlin, Germany. The label's name and logo come from the Odéon-Théâtre de l'Europe in Paris.

== History ==
Straus and Zuntz bought the company from Carl Lindström that he had founded in 1897. They transformed the Lindström enterprise into a public company, the Carl Lindström A.G. and in 1903 purchased Fonotipia Records, including their Odeon-Werke International Talking Machine Company.

International Talking Machine Company issued the Odeon label first in Germany in 1903 and applied for a U.S. trademark the same year. While other companies were making single-side discs, Odeon made them double-sided. In 1909 it created the first recording of a large orchestral work — and what may have been the first record album — when it released a 4-disc set of Tchaikovsky's Nutcracker Suite with Hermann Finck conducting the London Palace Orchestra.

Between 1910 and 1911 Odeon was acquired by Carl Lindström. On 30 January 1904, Odeon became a part of the Carl Lindström Company, which also owned Beka Records, Parlophone, Fonotipia, Lyrophon, Homophon and other labels. Lindström was acquired by the English Columbia Graphophone Company in 1926. In 1931 Columbia merged with Electrola and other labels to form EMI.

The Berlin Odeon plant recorded, processed, and exported records to many countries. There were extensive national catalogs for some of these countries: Greece, Scandinavia, India, all of Arabia, Netherlands, Estonia, Portugal, South and Central America, Romania, Turkey, Hungary, China, Dutch East Indies, Siam, the Balkan countries etc. In the 1920s and 1930s about 70% of the German Odeon production was exported. Some Odeon recordings were leased to the American Okeh Records for distribution in the United States.

Odeon discs were first manufactured in America, for export only, in 1905 or 1906 by the American Record Company, which produced lateral-cut, 10¾-inch 78 discs made of blue shellac. This business ceased in 1907 when ARC was sued by Columbia for patent infringement. Lindström tried again to open an American branch, this time through Otto Heineman, who worked for Lindström's company and was living in America when World War I broke out. Stuck in New York, Heineman created the Otto Heineman Phonograph Supply Company in 1915, then four years later started his own label, Okeh Records.

In 1919, Okeh began issuing foreign recordings in the United States on the Odeon label. During the 1920s, Odeon issued American jazz records in other countries, such as Germany, Italy, France, and Spain. During the 1930s and 1940s Odeon sold its Swing Music Series.

Odeon recorded and issued over 2,700 titles of Indian music from the period 1900–1940.

Odeon's shellac disc issues were in two phases: (1) 1912–1916 and (2) 1932–1938. During the first phase their engineers visited many cities to record the diverse regional music of India, and after production in Berlin shipped records back to India. The company was based in Mumbai and Madras during the second phase. However the outbreak of World War II, and the subsequent trade embargoes, meant that the company had to wind-up its operations in India.

The company's output included "drama songs, speeches, folk music, classical music, drama sets, skits and plays, vocal and instrumental music". It has been estimated that about 600 titles have survived in private collections. The British Museum have digitised some of these records which are free in an online archive.

After World War II, the Odeon label continued as an EMI subsidiary in many non-English-speaking markets, such as West Germany, France, Spain, Scandinavia, Japan and Latin America. The dome logo was still used in most of those places, although they also had their own label designs.

With the sale of most EMI properties to erstwhile rival Universal Music Group (UMG) in September 2012, Universal retained the right to reissue from namely Odeon's post-war Japanese, Latin American, German and select European catalogues, while another former competitor Warner Music Group (WMG) acquired the rights to the remainder of EMI in February 2013 and with that, reissues from Odeon's French, Scandinavian, Spanish and most other European releases, to comply with the European Commission's divestiture conditions. Universal Music Enterprises manages UMG's Odeon catalogue with Parlophone and WEA International handling WMG's own.

In October 2018, Universal Music Germany revived Odeon to release the brass pop band Querbeat's third album Randale & Hurra.

== See also ==
- List of record labels
