= Ivan Kondratyev =

Russian writer (1849–1904)

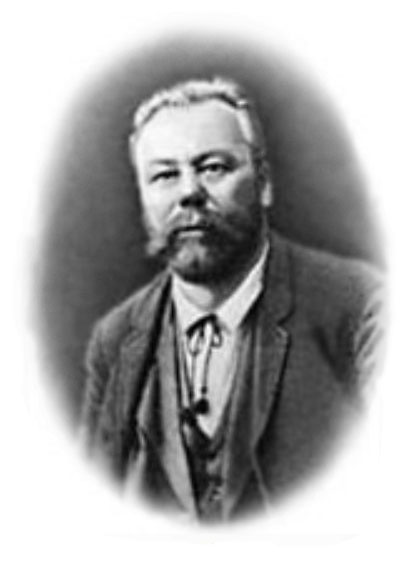
Portrait of Kondratiev, end of the 19th century

Ivan Kuzmich Kondratyev (Russian: Иван Кузьмич Кондратьев; Belarusian: Іван Кузьміч Кандрацьеў, romanized: Ivan Kuźmič Kondracjeŭ; 21 June [O.S. 9 June] 1849 – 1 June [O.S. 19 May] 1904) was a Russian writer, playwright and poet. According to Ivan Belousov, Kondratyev was a member of Vasily Surikov's circle.

Kondratyev authored a novel called Saltychikha (Russian: Салтычиха), numerous short stories, plays, poetry (The Death of Attilla, Pushkin and the Gypsy, Stenka Razin's Feast), historical essays (The grey olden times of Moscow, Russian: Седая старина Москвы) and translations, as well as two collections: Думы и были (Thoughts and True Stories, Moscow, 1884) and Под шум дубрав. Песни. Думы. Былины. Народные сказания (Under the Noise of Oak Groves. Songs, Thoughts, Epic Poems, Popular Stories, Moscow, 1898). Both Belousov and Korney Chukovsky were highly critical of Kondratyev's work.

Kondratyev is also known as an expert on songs, publishing several studies on popular Russian songs, the most important of these studies being: You Russian Song (Russian: Песня ты русская), Those Are the Songs of My Motherland (Russian: То песни родины моей...) and The Power of Song (Russian: Сила песни). Many of his poems are written in the tradition of Russian songs and have been used as lyrics for songs by Vasily Andreyevich Zolotaryov and other less known composers. He also wrote the lyrics for various popular romances, the best known of these being Charming Eyes (Russian: Очаровательные глазки). He is also credited with the lyrics of the song On the Wild Steppes of Transbaikalya (Russian: По диким степям Забайкалья...)
