= Glorious Sea, Sacred Baikal =

Russian folk song

"Glorious Sea, Sacred Baikal" (Russian: Славное море — священный Байкал, romanized: Slavnoe more — svyashchennyy Baykal) is a folk song of Siberia, Russia, which has been sung since the 19th century. Its words are by Dmitriy Davidov (Дмитрий Павлович Давыдов), but its composer is unknown.

== Words ==
During the 19th century, many Russians were exiled to Siberia for various reasons. In 1848, Dmitriy Davidov, after visiting Ulan-Ude, wrote a poem entitled "Thoughts of a Fugitive in Baikal" in eleven stanzas, of which five were put into this song.

The song's first stanza:

Davidov's Original
Славное море — привольный Байкал,
Славный корабль — омулёвая бочка.
Ну, баргузин, пошевеливай вал,
Плыть молодцу недалeчко!

Transliteration

Slavnoe more — privol'nyy Baykal, Slavnyy korabl' — omulyovaya bochka. Nu, barguzin, poshevelivay val, Plyt' molodtsu nedalechko!

As It Is Sung Now
Славное море — священный Байкал,
Славный корабль — омулёвая бочка.
Эй, баргузин, пошевеливай вал,
Молодцу плыть недалeчко!

Transliteration

Slavnoe more — svyashchennyy Baykal, Slavnyy korabl' — omulyovaya bochka. Ey, barguzin, poshevelivay val, Molodtsu plyt' nedalechko!

English Translation (GFDL)
Glorious sea, sacred Baikal,
My glorious boat is a barrel to contain omul fish.
Hey, Barguzin wind, create your waves,
And carry this lad on his way!

== See also ==
- "The Wanderer"
