= Carl Lindström Company =

German record company founded by Swedish industrialist Carl Lindström

Carl Lindström A.G.
- Industry: Manufacture of magnetic and optical media media industry
- Founded: 1893
- Founder: Carl Lindström
- Defunct: 1926
- Headquarters: Berlin, Germany
- Parent: EMI

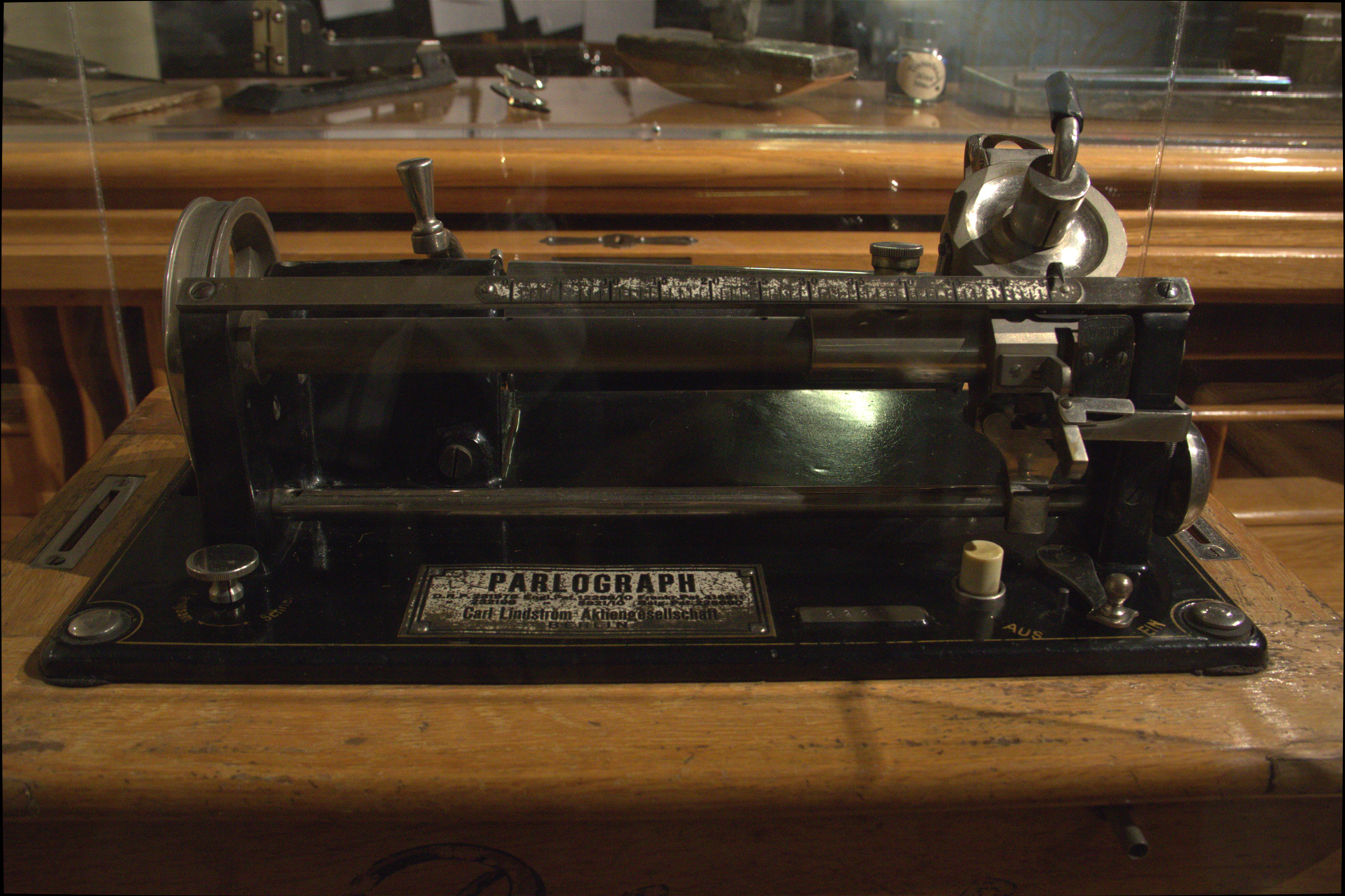
Parlograph, Carl Lindström AG, Berlin, 1910s

"Parlophon" ad from 1927, Berlin

Carl Lindström A.G. was a global record company founded in 1893 and based in Berlin, Germany.

== History ==
Founded by Carl Lindström (1869–1932), a Swedish inventor living in Berlin, it originally produced phonographs or gramophones with the brand names "Parlograph" and "Parlophon" and eventually began producing records as well. It became the holding company for Odeon Records, Parlophone Records (originally "Parlophon"), Beka Records, Okeh Records, Fonotipia Records, Lyrophon, Homophon, and other labels. Lindström sold the company to Max Straus (Odeon co-founder), but Lindström remained with the company as an engineer and inventor.

World War I caused the company to cut back its holdings closing the United Kingdom branch of Odeon when war broke out. Okeh in the U.S. survived the war intact because its president, Otto Heinemann, was an American citizen. During the war, the Transoceanic Trading Company was set up in the Netherlands to look after its overseas assets. Lindström returned to the UK in 1923 with the establishment of a British Parlophone branch. Parlophone's "₤" trademark is not the lira sign but a stylised blackletter "L" ($\mathfrak{L}$) for Lindström. Among Parlophone's later claims to fame, it was the label for UK releases by The Beatles and Peter Sellers.

The introduction of electrical recording with microphones and mixing consoles put Lindström at a disadvantage and they sold the company in 1926 to the Columbia Graphophone Company which had rights to electrical recording technology. In 1931, Columbia Graphophone merged with the Gramophone Company to form EMI with the labels retaining their identities. EMI's German unit in 1931 was originally called "Lindström-Electrola" after the merger. Okeh became part of the American operations of Columbia Records. Parlophone became a major powerhouse in the EMI portfolio of labels thanks to the company's signing in 1962 of The Beatles. As a condition of Universal Music Group acquiring EMI in 2012, European regulators forced EMI to spin off certain assets into a separate company called Parlophone Music Group. Parlophone was acquired by Warner Music Group in 2013.

== See also ==
- List of record labels
