= The Galloping Major (song) =

1906 song by Fred W. Leigh

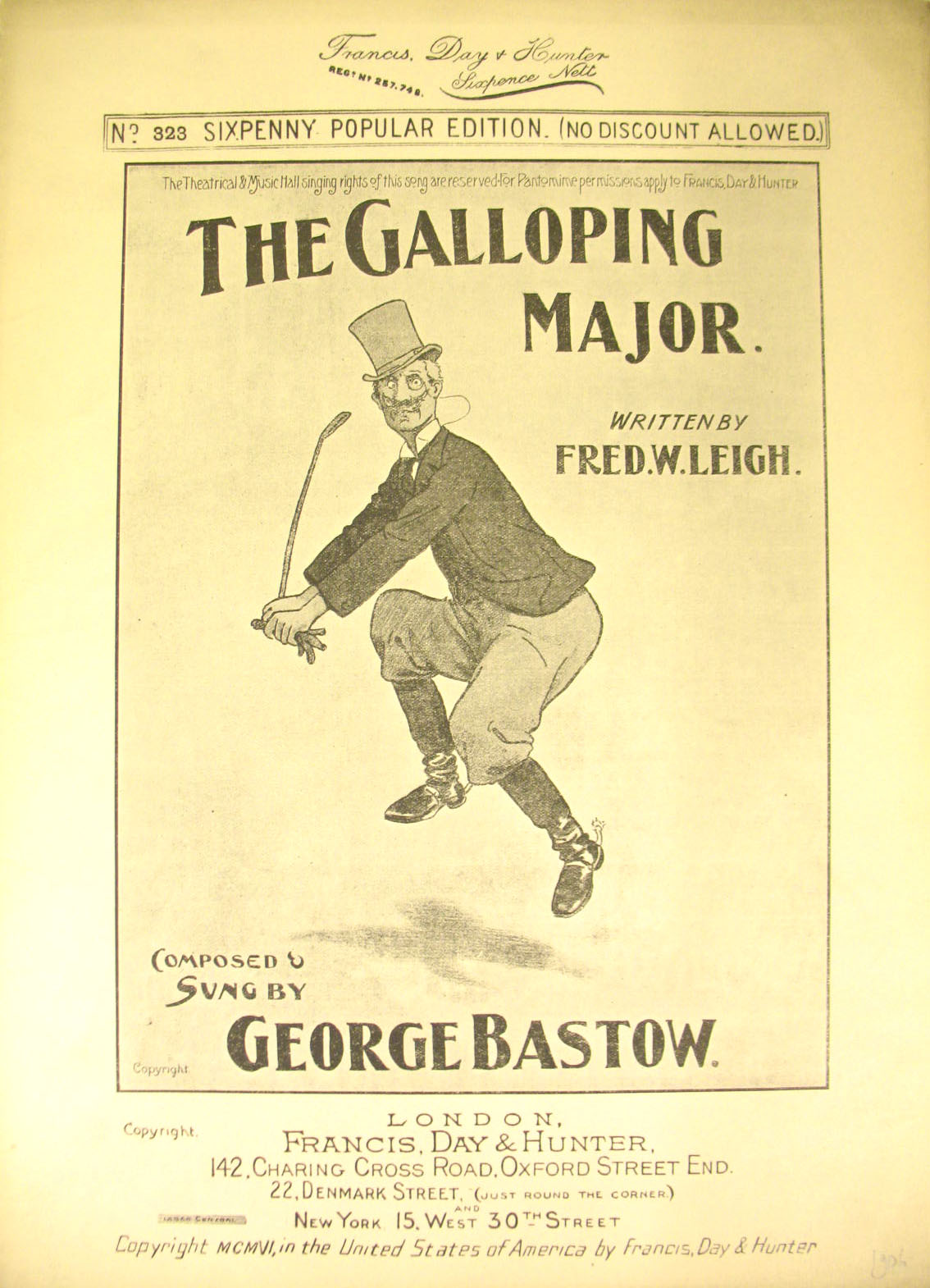
Original sheet music from 1906

"The Galloping Major" is a British popular song written by Fred W. Leigh and composed by George Bastow. It was first published in London in 1906 by Francis, Day and Hunter. It was first sung by George Bastow, and first recorded by Harry Graham, also in 1906.

== Lyrics ==
The following lyrics are taken from the sheet music published in 1906:

Verse 1:

When I was in the army I was a cavalry man, you know,
And whenever I went on parade
A magnificent picture I made.
Through my galloping here, and my galloping there,
This ridiculous habit I got,
And I'm hanged if I don't think I'm galloping now
Whether up in the saddle or not!
And the people they stare at me so,
For it matters not where I may go, It's –

Chorus (to be sung after each verse):

Bump-i-ty! bump-i-ty! bump-i-ty! bump! As if I was riding my charger.
Bump-i-ty! bump-i-ty! bump-i-ty! bump! As proud as an Indian rajah.
All the girls declare That I'm a gay old stager.
Hey! hey! clear the way! Here comes the galloping major!

Verse 2:

Last year I thought I'd treat myself to a holiday by the sea,
So I went, and my quarters I fixed;
Then I found that the bathing was mixed.
So I galloped away to a bathing machine
In the busiest part of the day,
And I soon felt at home with the girls in the water,
And joined in their frivolous play.
They were beautiful creatures, but lor!
How they giggled as soon as they saw Me –

Verse 3:

I always was a ladies' man, and a favourite with the sex;
Well, I called upon one yesterday,
Though I won't give the lady away.
She started to talk of my army career,
And was quite interested, you see,
But I got rather tired, so we talked about her,
Which was more interesting to me.
And she said I'd been taking some wine,
For as soon as we sat down to dine I went –

Encore verse:

I don't tell ev'ryone, but still, I was married some time ago.
I regret of the matter to speak –
We were only together a week.
I endeavoured, of course, to make Gwendoline happy,
But one day, alas! and alack!
That impulsive young creature ran home to her mother,
And told her she wouldn't go back.
When I said that I thought it was rough,
She replied that she'd had quite enough Of my –

== Recordings ==
The following artists have recorded the song (with record company and recording date):

- Harry Graham, Edison Cylinder 13543, 1906
- Stanley Kirkby (as Walter Miller), Zonophone, 1907
- Stanley Holloway, Join in the Chorus, Vanguard, 1960 (VRS 9086)
- Flanagan and Allen, The Flanagan And Allen Story, Encore, 1964 (ENC 151)

=== Film ===
The title was also used for the 1951 film, starring Basil Radford, The Galloping Major.

An instrumental version was played over the opening credits of the 1973 film No Sex Please, We're British.

=== Television ===
The song was performed by Charlie Covell in the Midsomer Murders episode "Shot at Dawn".
