= Scala Records =

British record label from 1911 to 1927

- Founded: 1911
- Country of origin: Britain

Scala Records was a British record label which was in business between 1911 and 1927. The source firm was the Scala Record Co. Ltd., based in London. Pressings were from Germany until the First World War, then from London, with masters from Beka and others. A number of American masters were used, such as those from Vocalion and Gennett. The repertoire was jazz, popular music, and vocal. A second label, Scala Ideal, offered the same popular material between 1923 and 1927.
