= Ernest Pike =

English tenor singer

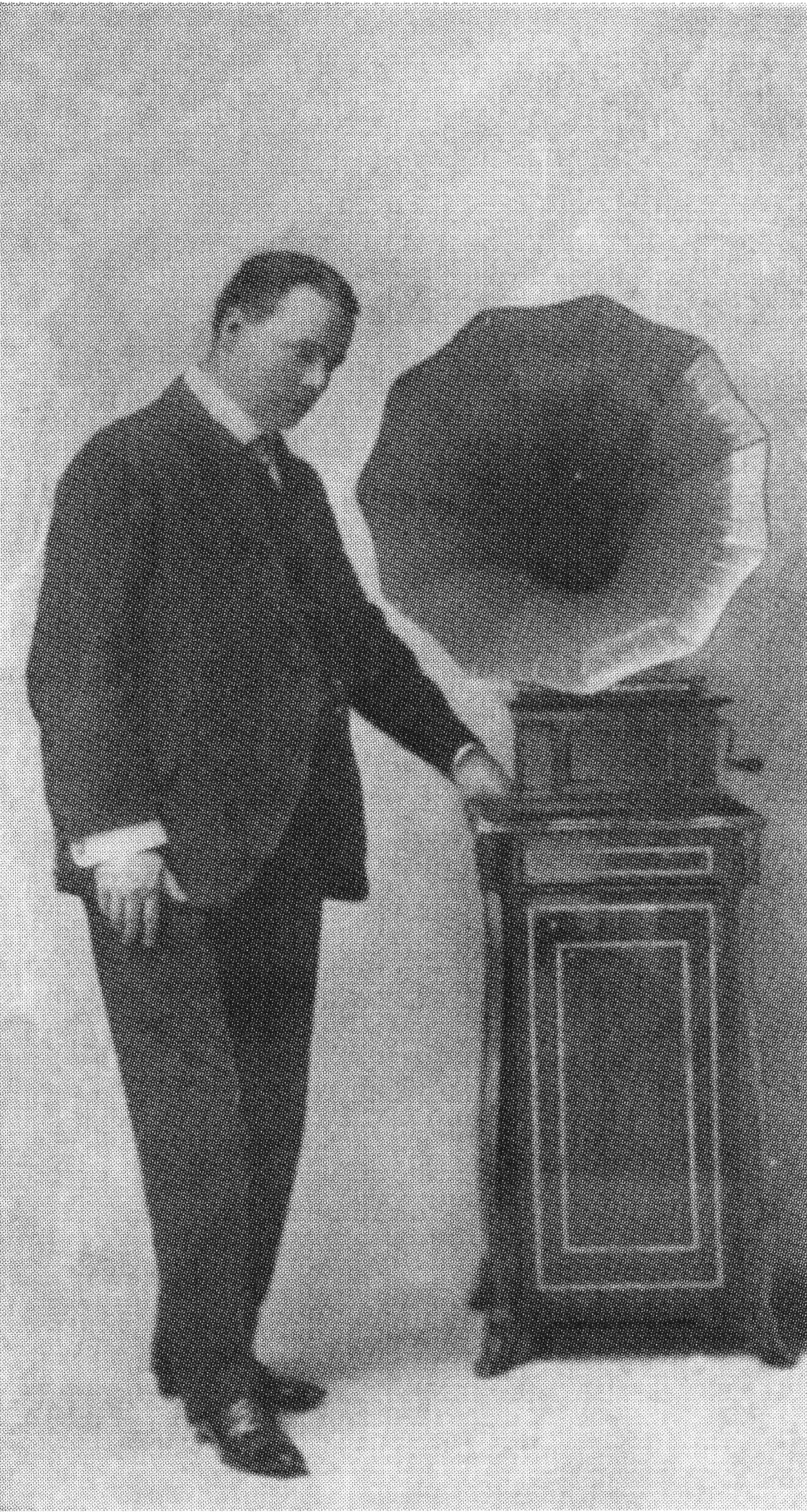
Ernest Pike standing beside a G&T Sheraton gramophone, c. 1907, photo from a record sleeve of one of the Zonophone grand opera series.

La donna è mobile
"La donna è mobile" from Rigoletto, recorded ca. 1905–1908

Ernest George Pike (1871 – 4 March 1936) was an English tenor of the early 20th century who made numerous recordings in the first decades of the 20th century. After studying at the Guildhall School of Music in London, he worked as a bank clerk and sang as a church tenor before making his first recording "Take a Pair of Sparkling Eyes" for the Gramophone & Typewriter Company in 1904. He became the house tenor for HMV and made several hundred records in a career that spanned over twenty years.

Pike has been called "England's most recorded tenor", and his "silver voice" became a favourite in thousands of homes – remaining so until well into the 1920s. For a time his popularity was as great as that of the singer Peter Dawson. His repertoire was varied and included grand opera, light opera, oratorio, and ballads and popular songs of the Edwardian era, the First World War and the 1920s. He toured the British Isles giving concerts and was a favourite of royalty. He recorded under a number of pseudonyms – most commonly Herbert Payne.

== Early career ==
Ernest Pike was born in Pimlico, London, England in 1871 the son of Richard Pike, a builder. As a young tenor he sang in several choirs. In 1887 at the age of 16 and using the pseudonym Herbert Payne, he toured with the D'Oyly Carte Opera Company's "B" Company playing one of the ghosts of the ancestors in Gilbert and Sullivan's Ruddigore. He went on to study at the Guildhall School of Music in London for two years before continuing his musical studies privately.

After completing his studies in the early 1890s, Pike worked as a clerk for a bank in Victoria, London; he became a shorthand writing expert and taught his skill to other employees. Sometime during the 1890s he was appointed principal tenor at Holy Trinity Church, Sloane Street, London – a post that he still held in 1903. He also sang at The Spanish Church (St. James), Spanish Place, Marylebone, London. The church singing was done in his free time while he worked at the bank during the day. His profession was still that of a commercial clerk when he married May Stevens in 1900. They had a daughter Maud who was born in 1901.

He soon began to receive invitations to sing at the London Ballad Concerts which were held at the Queen's Hall and Royal Albert Hall in London. He also started to receive many offers of provincial engagements. With a now busy concert schedule and the start of his recording career in 1904, he was able to resign his post at Holy Trinity Sloane Square (in c. 1904). In January 1905 he performed for King Edward VII at Chatsworth House in Derbyshire for three nights in succession when the King was in residence for a visit to the Devonshire Hospital in Buxton. The 1913 Zonophone record catalogue described him as "The late King Edward's favourite tenor". During the Edwardian era he toured the country singing in many leading cities and towns. In 1909 he sang in Handel's Acis and Galatea at a Henry Wood Promenade concert in London. By the 1911 census the family was living in Balham, South London and his profession was given as that of a singer.

== Recording career ==
In April 1904 Pike made his first recording: "Take a Pair of Sparkling Eyes" (from Gilbert and Sullivan's The Gondoliers) for the Gramophone & Typewriter Company (G&T); it was released as a gramophone record (disc) in August of that year. From 1906 many of his recordings were released on the Gramophone Company's Zonophone label but he also released on Columbia, Ariel and Duophone. In addition, he recorded 2-minute Edison cylinders in 1907 starting with "When the Berry's on the Holly", 4-minute Edison cylinders 1908–1910 starting with "Always", Sterling cylinders c. 1907 and Pathé discs in 1908 starting with "I'll Sing Thee Songs of Araby". After 1922 he ceased to record for HMV and recorded only for Columbia's budget Regal label.

Between the early 1900s and the mid-1920s Pike recorded more than 2,400 matrixes (takes) for HMV. Assuming an average of three takes per song, this would equate to approximately 400 double-sided 78 rpm gramophone records for HMV alone. An estimate of the total count of all his recordings (discs and cylinders) has put the figure at well over 500. He has been called "England's most recorded tenor" with his records of popular ballads becoming favourites in thousands of homes. For a time his popularity was as great as that of Peter Dawson. By the First World War he had become the house tenor for HMV.

Pike used many different pseudonyms, the greatest number being for his Zonophone recordings. These are listed as follows with associated record companies in brackets if used for companies other than HMV. Any variations in pseudonym are also shown in brackets: Herbert Payne (Zonophone, G&T and some Edisons), Harold Payne, David Boyd (shared with Harold Wilde), Arthur Brett, Eric Courtland (Columbia), Arthur Gray (or Arthur Grey), Alan Dale (or Allan Dale), Richard Pembroke, Jack Henty, Sam Hovey, Arthur Adams, Arthur Edwards (or Arthur Edwardes), Edgar Froome (Ariel), Charles Nelson, Billy Murray and J. Saunders. He was the Murray of "Murray & Denton", "Murray & Fay" and "Strong & Murray" and Cobbett in "Cobbett & Walker" (with Stanley Kirkby). He was Bernard Moss in some duets with Peter Dawson.

=== Operatic recordings ===
Pike sang in the earliest and often incomplete recordings of Gilbert and Sullivan (G&S) and other light operas of the era. In December 1906 he shared the role of Nanki-Poo in the first recording of The Mikado. This was released on single-sided gramophone records by G&T then re-released on double-sided discs by HMV in 1912. He shared the role of Sir Joseph Porter on the first recording of the G&S opera H.M.S. Pinafore which was recorded by the Russell Hunting company on eleven Edison cylinders in 1907. In 1999 these early cylinders were re-discovered after they had been thought lost. He probably sang Marco in The Gondoliers (1907 for G&T) – credit being given to the "Sullivan Operatic Party" and not to individual artists for this recording. He sang both Colonel Fairfax and Leonard Meryll in The Yeomen of the Guard (1907 for G&T) and Ralph Rackstraw in the 1908 (Gramophone Company) recording of H.M.S. Pinafore.

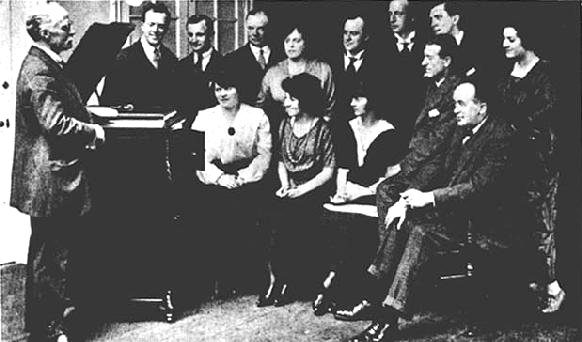
Ernest Pike (standing, fourth from left, counting the conductor) at one of the recording sessions for The Pirates of Penzance in 1920

Between 1908 and 1910 Pike sang on a small series of grand opera recordings which were released on the Zonophone white label, for example he recorded "Miserere" from Il Trovatore in 1908 and "La donna è mobile" from Rigoletto in 1910, both by Verdi and both recorded with Eleanor Jones-Hudson as Alveena Yarrow. In 1909 he recorded "Solenne in Quest'ora" (in English) from Verdi's The Force of Destiny with Peter Dawson.

In 1917 after lengthy negotiations with Rupert D'Oyly Carte, HMV was granted permission to do a series of complete recordings of G&S operas. To retain the authenticity of the stage performances, these recordings were to be directly overseen by Rupert D'Oyly Carte. Pike was one of the chosen singers along with Peter Dawson, Derek Oldham, George Baker, Stanley Kirkby, Robert Radford, Edna Thornton, Violet Essex, Sarah Jones and Bessie Jones. Pike shared the singing of both Nanki-Poo and Pish Tush in The Mikado (1917); sang Luiz, Francesco and parts of Marco in The Gondoliers (1919), and Leonard Meryll and the First Yeoman in The Yeomen of the Guard (1920). He sang the Duke of Dunstable in Patience (1921). In 1918 he sang Silas Simkins in HMV's complete recording of Merrie England by Edward German.

In the acoustic recording era it was accepted practice for recordings to be made by "studio singers" (in this case provided by HMV) rather than by the singers who would have performed the same roles in stage productions. By 1922 Carte was insisting that his company's own singers be allowed to perform in the recordings, a move that prevented Pike and several others from singing further solo parts. In Iolanthe (1922), Pike was relegated to the chorus. After this he did not participate in any further recordings of G&S operas made by HMV.

=== Popular recordings ===
Pike is probably best remembered for his prolific output of the popular songs of his day. He became well known for his recordings of First World War songs, for example the American song "There's a Long Long Trail" in 1916 and "Take me Back to Dear Old Blighty" (as Eric Courtland) in a duet with George Baker (as Walter Jeffries) in 1917; he also made one of the earliest recordings of the famous ballad "Roses of Picardy" in 1918 shortly after it had been written. He collaborated with other well-known artists, for example with Peter Dawson in Dawson's recording of "The Lost Chord" made in 1907 and with Stanley Kirkby in "When You Wore a Tulip" in 1916 (as Cobbett and Walker) and "She Sells Sea Shells on the Seashore" in 1908 (as Herbert Payne with Fred Cooper). Occasionally he would form part of a backing group or chorus in the recording studio known as "The Minster Singers" along with some or all of the following: Stanley Kirkby, Eleanor Jones-Hudson, Peter Dawson and Thorpe Bates; sometimes there were additional singers in this group. The Minster Singers also recorded songs in its own right, for example "In the Shade of the Old Apple Tree" in 1906.

Below is a selection of some of Pike's solo songs which typify the popular repertoire that he recorded for HMV. The year of recording and any pseudonyms used are also given:

- "Take a Pair of Sparkling Eyes", 1904
- "When the Sunset Turns the Ocean's Blue to Gold", 1906 (as Arthur Brett)
- "In My Aeroplane for Two", 1907 (as Herbert Payne)
- "Killarney", 1908 (as Pike). 1907 and 1912 (as Herbert Payne)
- "When You Know You're Not Forgotten (by the Girl You Can't Forget)", 1907 (as Herbert Payne)
- "Ayesha, My Sweet Egyptian", 1909 (as Herbert Payne)
- "The Trail of the Lonesome Pine", 1913 (as Herbert Payne)
- "The Sunshine of Your Smile", 1914 (as Herbert Payne)
- "When the War Is Over Mother Dear", 1915 (as Herbert Payne)
- "There's a Long Long Trail", 1915
- "Roses of Picardy", 1918
- "Hello New York", 1918

== Singing voice ==
Pike was a lyric tenor but had difficulty beginning with the top A and, although he could go higher, he tended to avoid the higher tenor notes. In his memoirs the producer and recording engineer Fred Gaisberg remembered Pike as a "silver-voiced tenor". The singer George Baker said of Pike: "He had a smooth tenor voice that was easy to record because of its even quality". However, Baker also thought Pike's style to be "unemotional".

== Death ==
He died of a cerebral haemorrhage on 4 March 1936, aged 64 in Streatham, South London.
