= Ritte Cycles =

Ritte Cycles is a United States-based company that designs and markets bicycles and cycling apparel. The company was founded in 2010 by Spencer Canon.
