= Řetůvka =

- Municipality
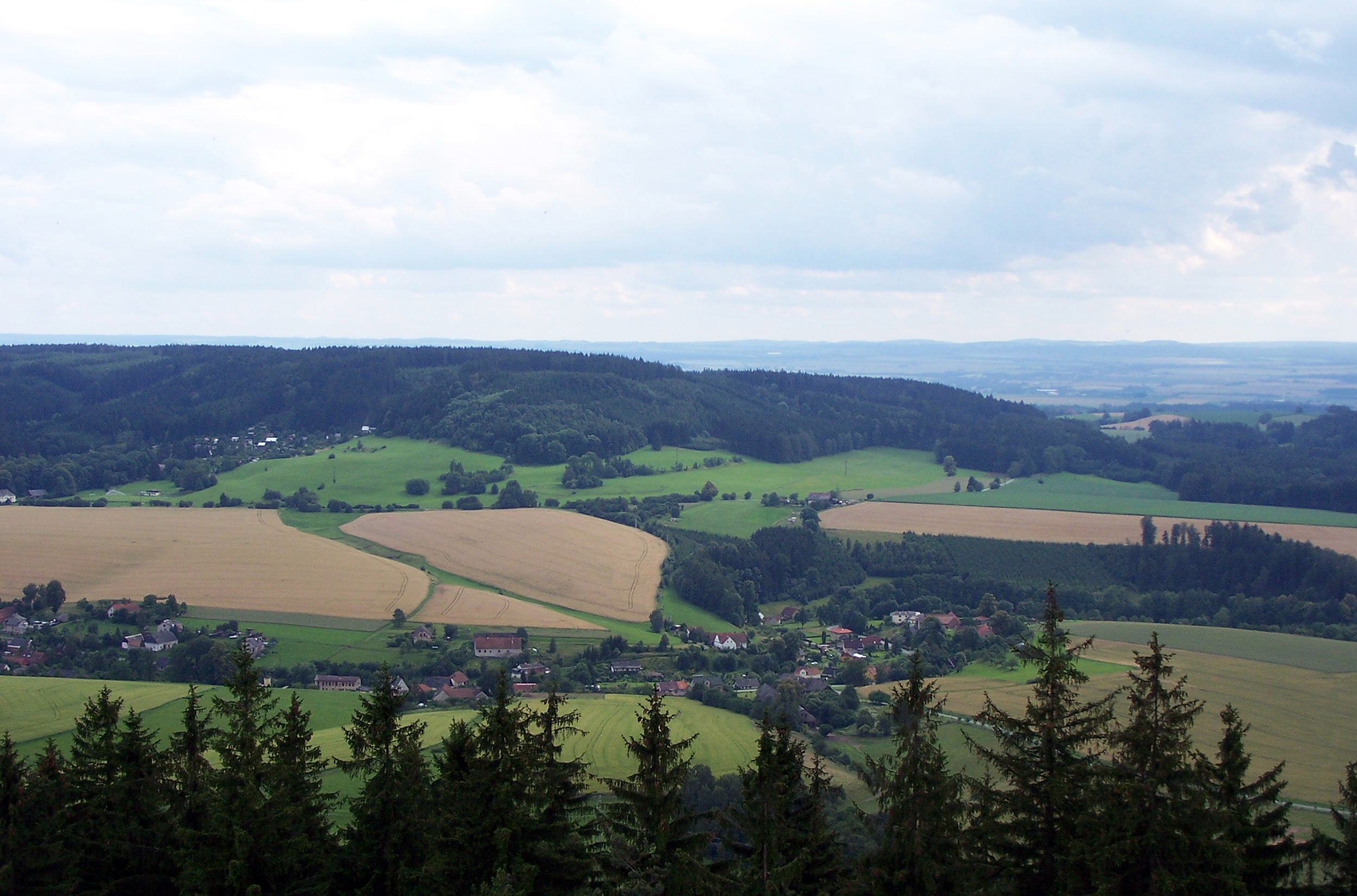
- View from the east

- Flag Coat of arms

- Location in the Czech Republic
- Coordinates: 49°57′21″N 16°21′22″E
- Country: Czech Republic
- Region: Pardubice
- District: Ústí nad Orlicí
- First mentioned: 1292

Area
  - Total: 4.23 km^{2} (1.63 sq mi)
- Elevation: 380 m (1,250 ft)

Population (2026-01-01)
  - Total: 281
  - Density: 66.4/km^{2} (172/sq mi)
- Time zone: UTC+1 (CET)
  - Summer (DST): UTC+2 (CEST)
- Postal code: 561 41
- Website: www.obecretuvka.cz

Řetůvka (German: Ritte) is a municipality and village in Ústí nad Orlicí District in the Pardubice Region of the Czech Republic. It has about 300 inhabitants.

Řetůvka lies approximately 4 kilometres (2 mi) south-west of Ústí nad Orlicí, 43 km (27 mi) east of Pardubice, and 140 km (87 mi) east of Prague.

== Demographics ==
Historical population
Year	Pop.	±%
1869	606	—
1880	682	+12.5%
1890	665	−2.5%
1900	644	−3.2%
1910	605	−6.1%
1921	535	−11.6%
1930	551	+3.0%
1950	417	−24.3%
1961	400	−4.1%
1970	396	−1.0%
1980	324	−18.2%
1991	248	−23.5%
2001	237	−4.4%
2011	271	+14.3%
2021	244	−10.0%
Source: Censuses
