= Beka Records =

German record label

- Company type: Incentive
- Industry: record label
- Founded: 1903; Germany
- Defunct: 1925
- Fate: Tax Dormitory: Sold to Carl Lindström Company; Reincorporated under the Gramophone Company
- Headquarters: Germany
- Parent: Carl Lindström Company

Label of a Beka Record

Beka Records was a record label based in Germany, active from about 1903 to 1925. Before World War I, Beka also made gramophone records for the United Kingdom market under the Beka-Grand Records label. The company became a subsidiary of the Carl Lindström Company which was sold to the Columbia Graphophone Company in 1926.

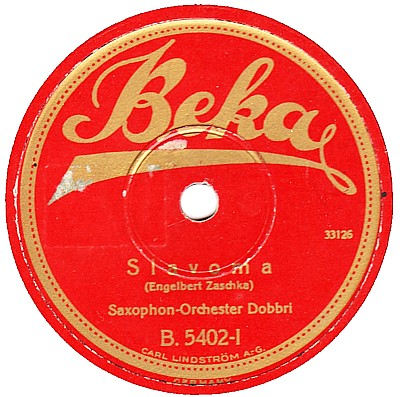
Slawoma - Der neueste Tanz (Slavoma) by Engelbert Zaschka. Saxophon-Orchester Dobbri of Berlin, 1925

Artists on the label included Bert Alvey, Jessie Broughton, Albertina Cassani, Lucia Cavalli, Cook & Carpenter, Gerhard Ebeler, Kappelle Willy Krug, Kapelle Merton, Miss Riboet, Phillip Ritte, the Beka London Orchestra, the Dobbri Saxophone Orchestra, the Martina Salon Orchestra, the Meister Orchestra, and the Royal Cowes Minstrels.

A history of Beka Records, together with a listing of known records issued by the label, is published by the City of London Phonograph and Gramophone Society (CLPGS) as part of their Reference Series of books.

== See also ==
- List of record labels
