= Coliseum Records =

Defunct British record label

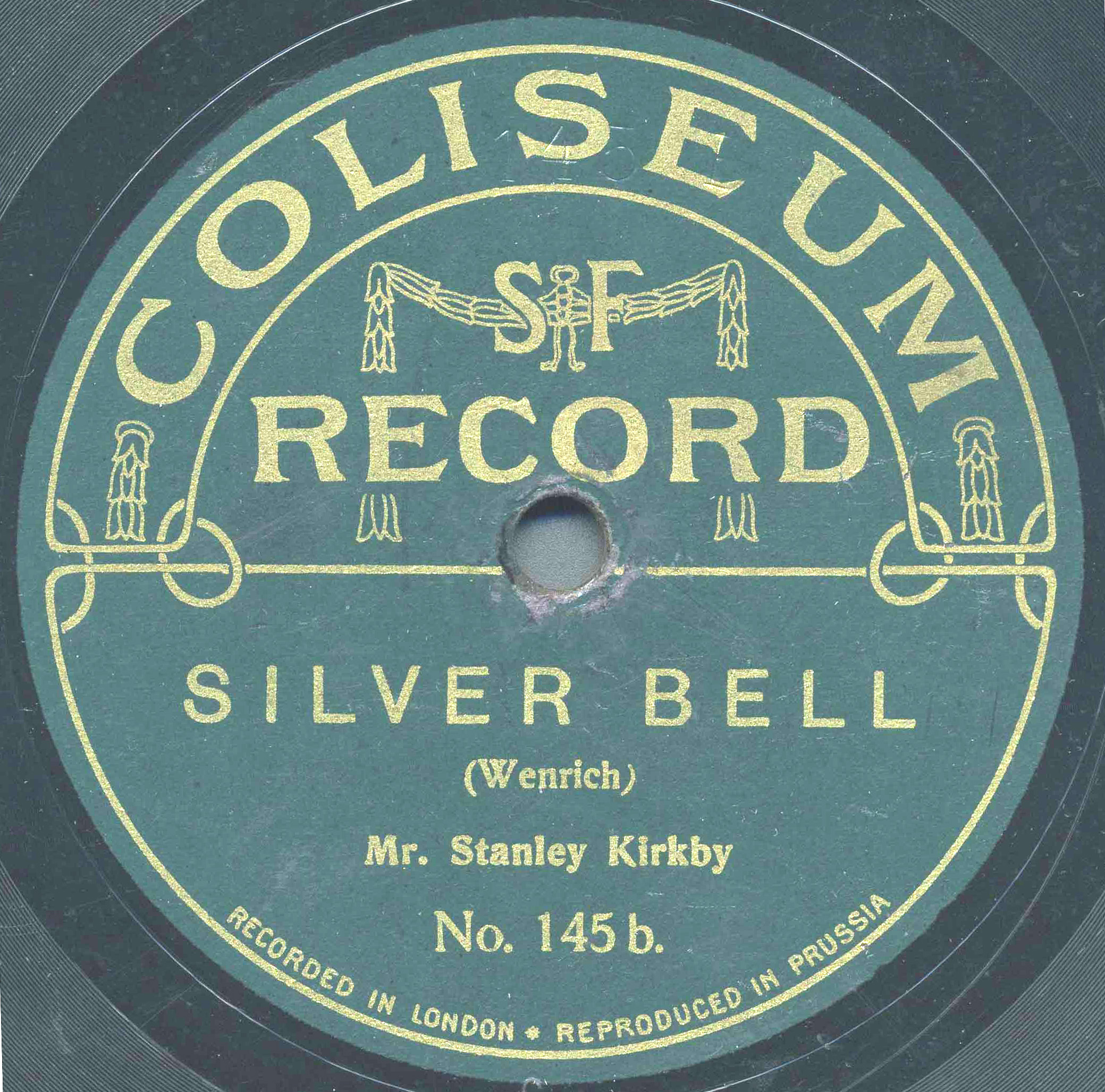
- Coliseum label c. 1912
- Status: Defunct
- Country of origin: UK

Coliseum Records was a British record label, which was in business between 1912 and 1927. The issues were mainly dance records made from Gennett, Vocalion and other labels' masters.
