= Khosheutovsky khurul =

Buddhist monastery in Rechnoye, Astrakhan Oblast, Russia

- Хошеутовский хурул
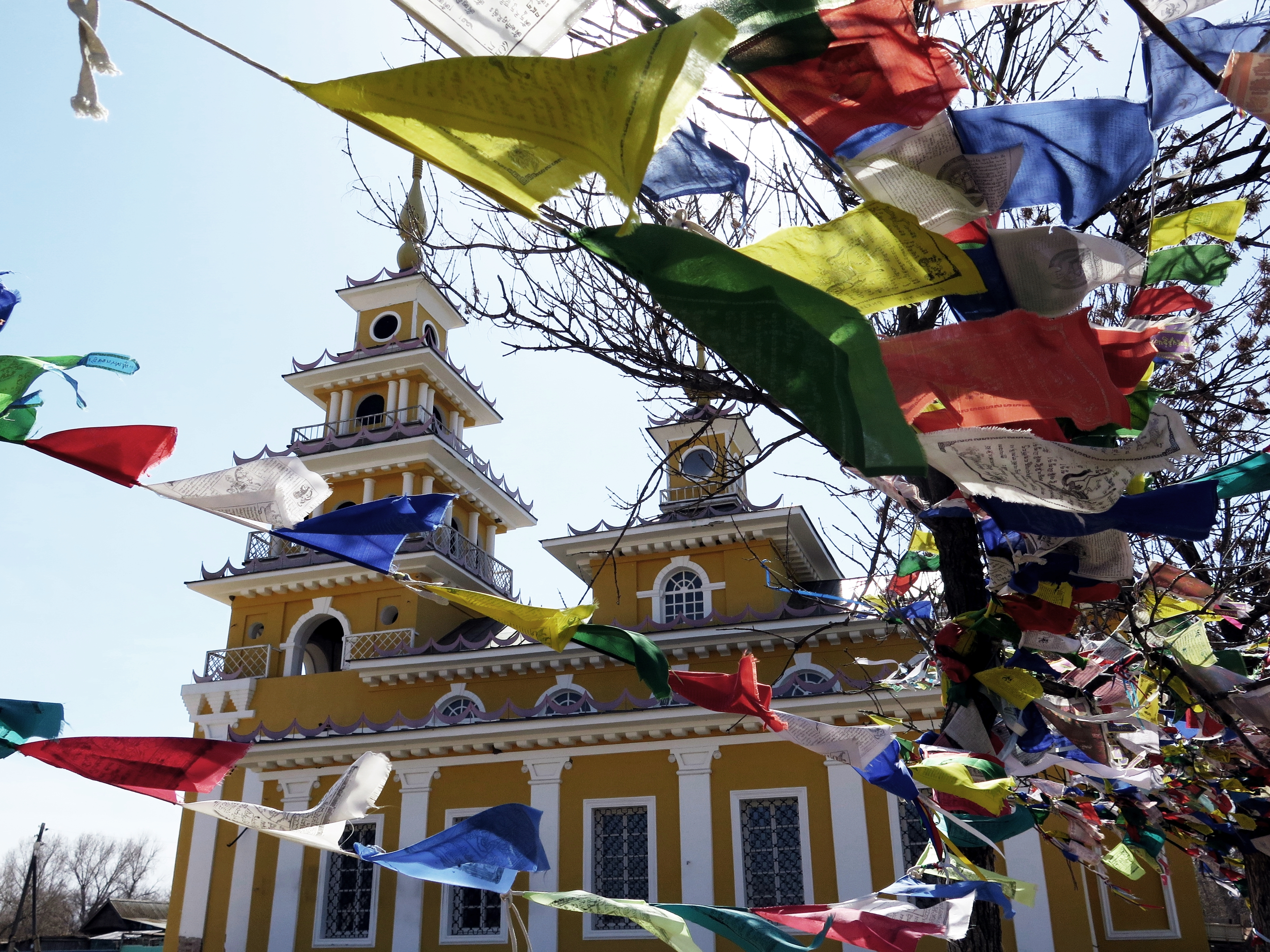
- The khurul as seen from the village of Rechnoye

- Location within Astrakhan Oblast

Monastery information
- Order: Gelug
- Denomination: Tibetan Buddhism
- Established: 1818
- Disestablished: 1920s
- Reestablished: 1990s

People
- Founder: Serebdzhab Tyumen

Architecture
- Heritage designation: Cultural Heritage of Russia
- Designated date: February 20, 1995
- Architect: Batur-Ubashi Tyumen & Gavan Dzhimba (Гаван Джимба)
- Groundbreaking: 1814
- Completed date: 1817-1818

Site
- Location: Rechnoye, Astrakhan Oblast
- Country: Russia
- Coordinates: 46°55′38″N 47°36′48.9″E
- Public access: Yes

Khosheutovsky khurul (Russian: Хошеу́товский хуру́л) is a Buddhist monastery of the early 19th century and an architectural and historical monument of federal significance. The khurul is located in the village of Rechnoye, Kharabalinsky District, Astrakhan Oblast. It is the only partially preserved Kalmyk khurul from pre-revolutionary times.

== History ==
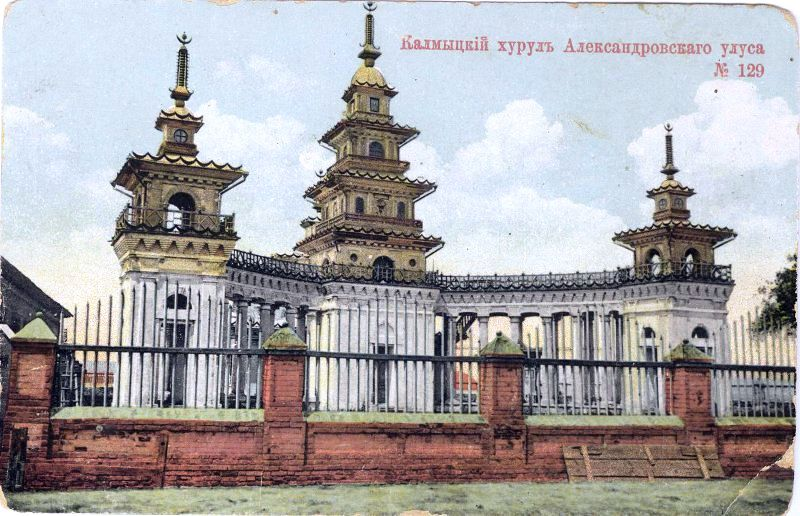
Khosheutovsky khurul - lithograph by an unknown artist from the 1840s

=== Foundation ===
In the past, there used to be a wooden temple on the site of the Khosheutovsky khurul, in which a divine service took place in honor of the Second Kalmyk Regiment, which participated in the Patriotic War of 1812 and the foreign campaigns of the Russian army; The regiment's banner was also kept in this temple. The construction of the Khosheutovsky khurul was initiated by the owner of the Khosheutovsky ulus, hero of the Patriotic War of 1812, Lieutenant Colonel Serebdzhab Tyumen, who wanted to build a memorial complex in memory of the Kalmyks who participated in the war; The monk Gavan Chombe became Tyumen's consultant. The Khosheutovsky khurul was built according to the design of Batur-Ubashi Tyumen. Construction of the khurul began in 1814 on the site of the old Buddhist temple and was completed in 1817-1818.

Battle flags of the Kalmyks were enshrined in the khurul. One of them depicted a rider on a white horse — Daichin-Tengri — in the Palden Lhamo style. On October 17-18, 1858, the khurul was visited by Alexandre Dumas, who was staying with Serebdzhab Tyumen at that time.

=== During Soviet rule ===
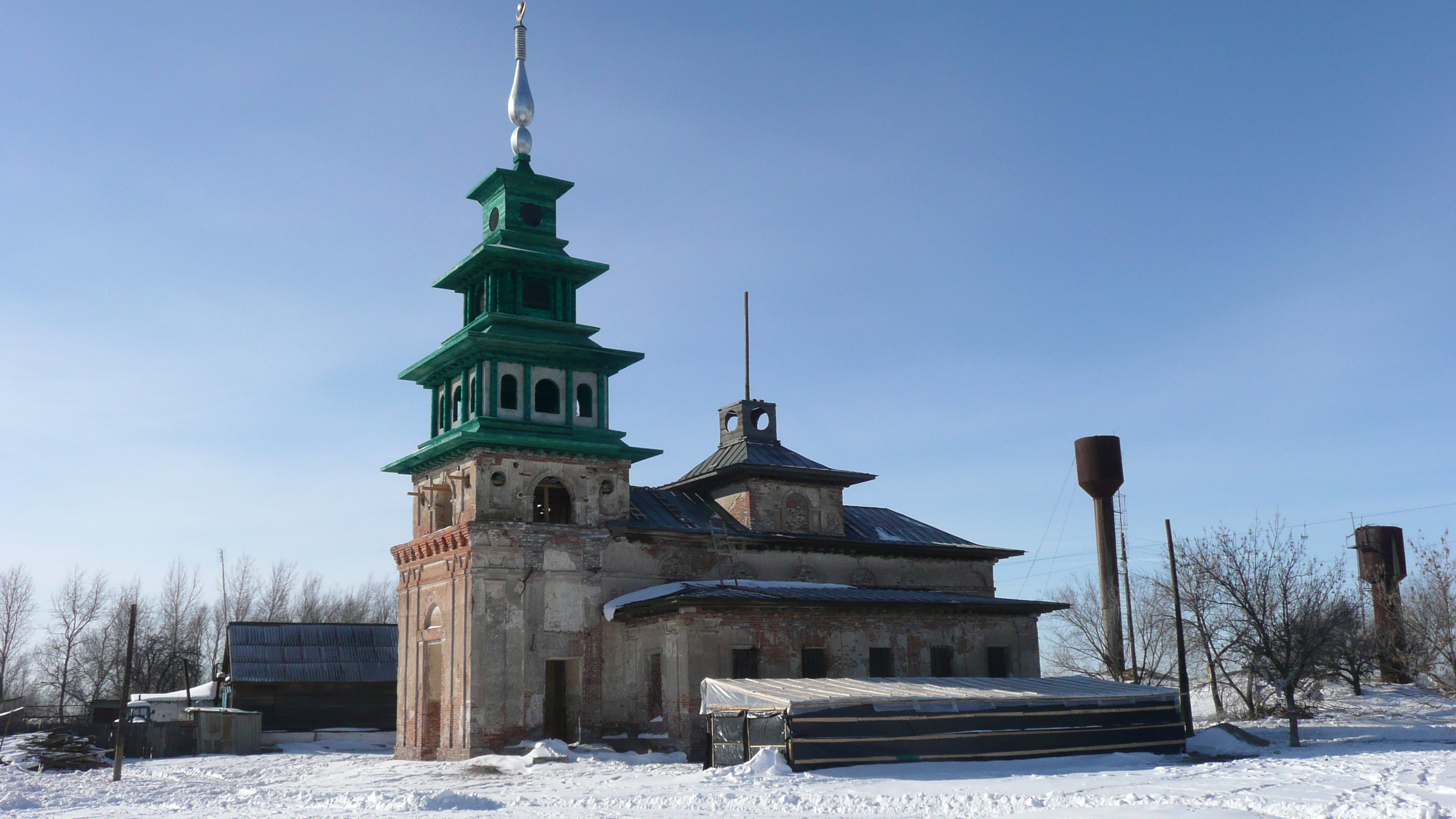
Khosheutovsky khurul before restoration works began in 2010

The Khosheutovsky khurul was closed during the 1920s. The following decade the khurul was used as a kindergarten, then as a school, and in the 1950s as a granary. Eventually, the gallery and small towers of the khurul were deconstructed, for the local kolkhoz was in need for bricks to build a cowshed in the 1960s. Later on, the remaining part of the khurul was abandoned and gradually began to collapse. Furthermore, after the beginning of the deportation of Kalmyks in 1944, the territory the Khosheutovsky khurul is located on was transferred from the then abolished Kalmyk ASSR to the Astrakhan Oblast. After the reestablishment of the Kalmyk ASSR in 1957 and the return of the Kalmyks to that region, the Kalmyks stated the need to return the Khosheutovsky khurul onto Kalmyk territory given its historical and cultural significance for the Kalmyk people.

=== Restoration ===
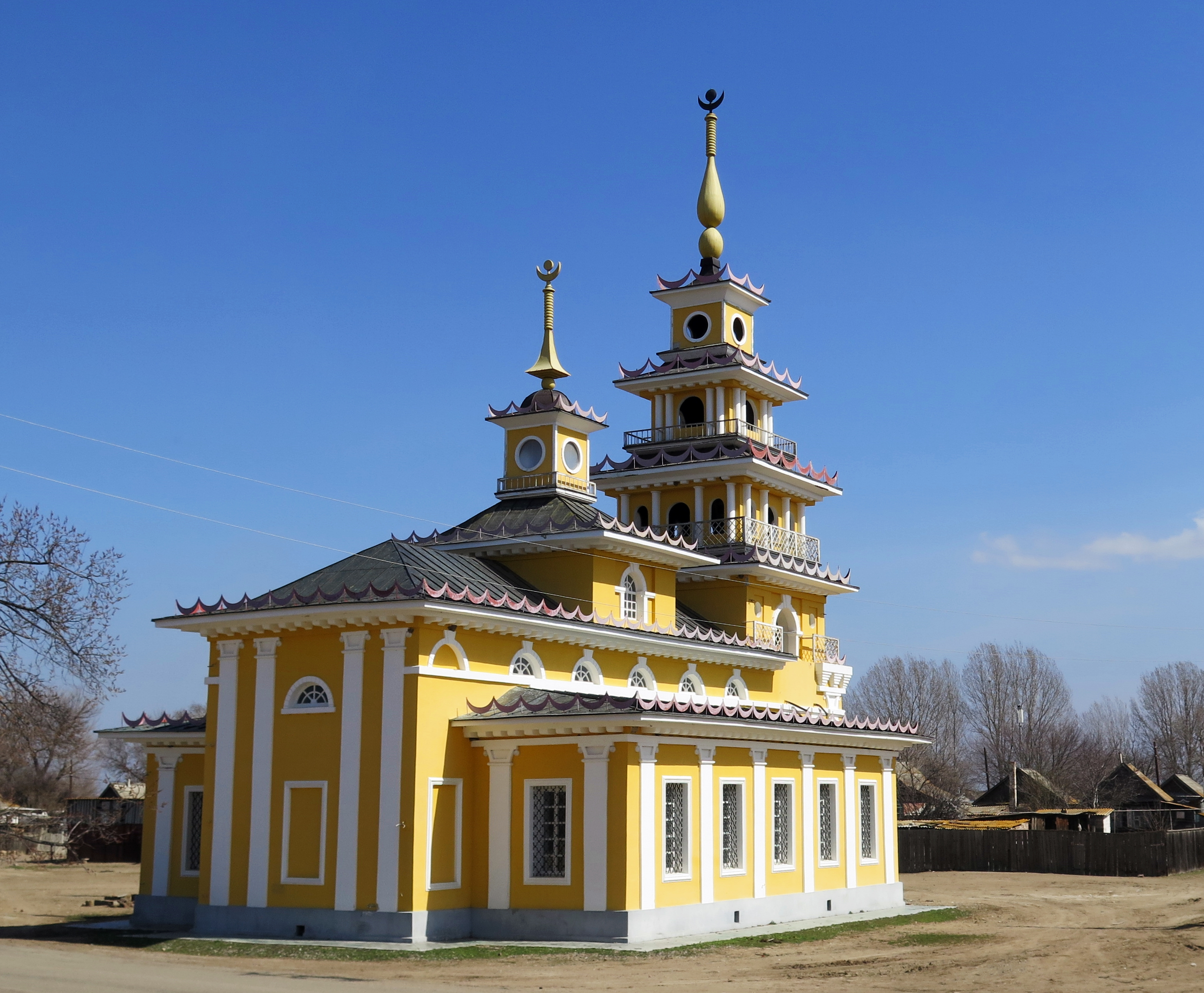
The khurul as seen from the Volga after restoration

In the Kalmyk ASSR, in Elista, after a meeting of the organizing committee held on October 23, 1990, at the Astrakhan Museum of Local Lore, the main scope of work on the restoration was approved, the necessary cost estimate for restoration was determined and the significance of this architectural monument was emphasized.

Restoration work of varying degrees of complexity was carried out in the khurul from 1991 to 2014. The initiators were the Astrakhan Museum of Local Lore and the Astrakhan society of local history. In 1996, the initiative group founded the Astrakhan branch of the International League for the Protection of Culture, headed by E.V. Rozhkova. The league united Astrakhan Buddhists, local historians, and representatives of the Society of National Kalmyk Culture in the fight for the preservation of the khurul. The Museum of Local Lore proposed to open a museum in the restored khurul in 1995, which was supposed to become a center for scientific and educational work, telling about the history of Buddhism and the peoples inhabiting the Astrakhan region. A project for future exhibitions was developed, including "Khosheutovsky khurul - a monument of history and culture".

On August 7, 2004, a decision was made to transfer the khurul for free use to the local Buddhist community. At the same time, a board of trustees was convened in Elista to restore the Khosheutovsky khurul. The first works started in 2009 with the restoration and painting of the top of the main building. Around 2011, the entire pagoda was restored.

== Current state ==
As an architectural and historical monument of federal significance, Khosheutovsky khurul is under federal protection. The contemporary khurul contains a partially preserved original painting.

== Architecture ==
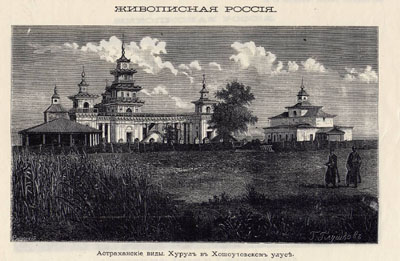
Lithograph of the khurul; around the end of the 19th - beginning of 20th century

The architecture of the khurul combines the features of Russian classicism and the traditional Kalmyk style. The basis for the composition of the khurul was the plan of the Kazan Cathedral in St. Petersburg; Moreover, the composition resembles the Khoshut tamga in the form of an arrow and a bow. The tamga was also imprinted on almost every brick of the khurul during its construction. According to Sergei Lyubimov, the nomadic khuruls Dekshidyn and Manlan were settled down around the Khosheutovsky khurul. They arrived from Dzungaria in 1811. A lithograph by an unknown artist from 1868 shows that both nomadic khuruls had stone syumes (Note: Syume — quadrangular monastery in Tibetan Buddhism) built for them, located to the left and right of the main building. At the beginning of the 20th century, the monastery complex, in addition to the main building and the syume of the nomadic khuruls, included a mani (a chapel with a prayer wheel, Kalmyk: кюрдэ, romanized: kyurde), several stupas, a court chapel of a Noyan and the dwellings of servants. Lyubimov noted that the monastery looked picturesque. By the beginning of the 21st century, only the chapel and the central building remained from the monastery complex; the galleries extending from it were also lost.

== See also ==
- Khurul — the Kalmyk term for Buddhist monasteries
- Buddhism in Kalmykia
- Buddhism in Russia
- Burkhan Bakshin Altan Sume
- Geden Sheddup Choikorling Monastery
