= Küriye =

Küriye (Mongolian: Хүрээ, Khüree, camp or monastery, simplified Chinese: 库伦; traditional Chinese: 庫倫; pinyin: Kùlún, also rendered as Kure, Kuren and other variants) can refer to the following places:

- an old name for Ulaanbaatar, capital of Mongolia
- a banner in Tongliao city, formerly Jirim league, of Inner Mongolia; see Hure Banner
- Küriye/Khüree is a part of a number of place names in Mongolia that grew out of monasteries:
  - [Daichin] Vangiin Khüree, now Bulgan (city)
  - Mörön Khüree, now Mörön (city)

== See also ==
- Khurul - the Oirat form of küriye
