= Dzhalykovo =

Dzhalykovo Джалыково
- Selo
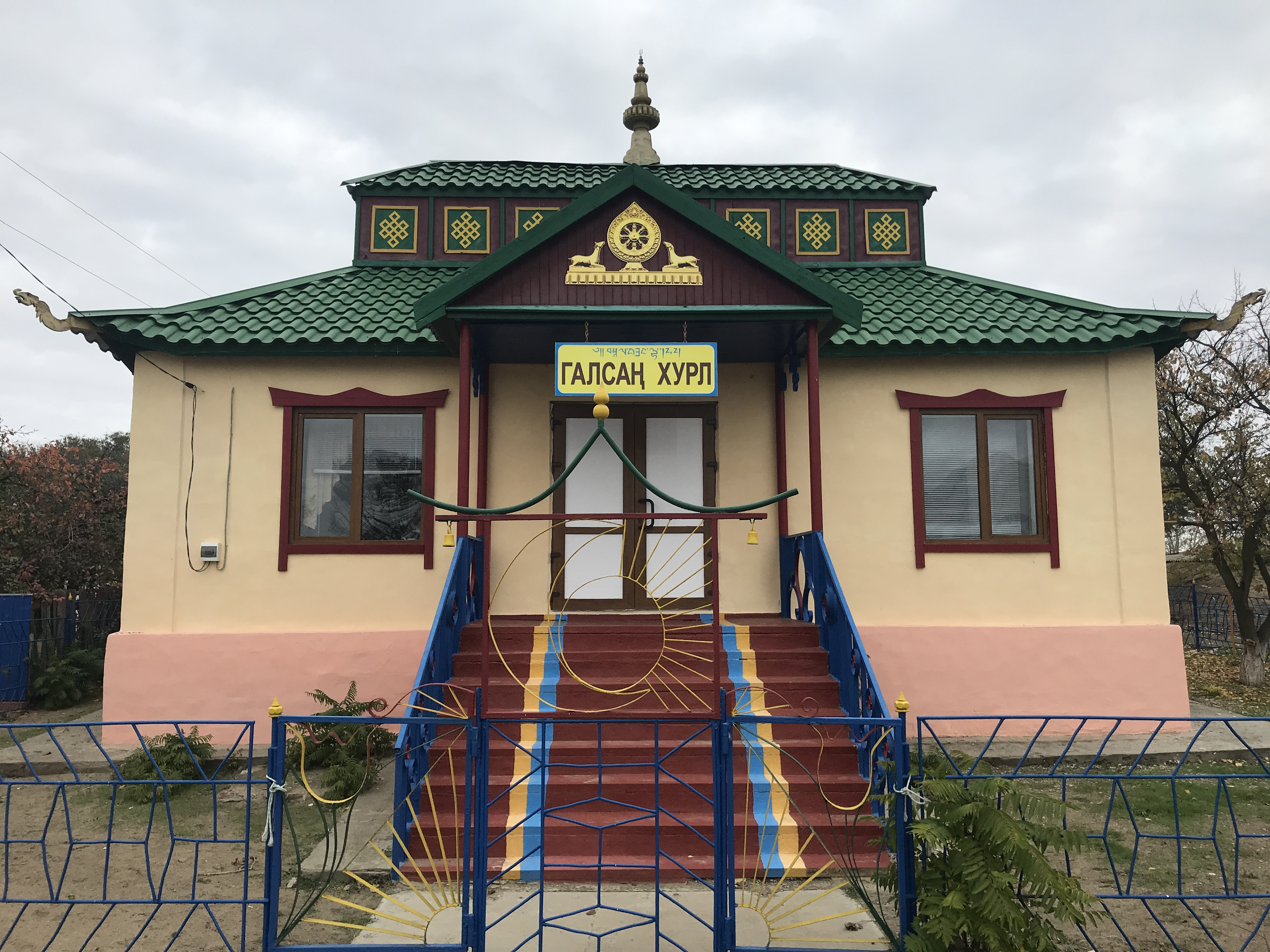
- Buddhist temple (khurul) in Dzhalykovo

- Location within Kalmykia Location within Russia
- Coordinates: 45°36′N 47°26′E
- Country: Russia
- Region: Kalmykia
- District: Lagansky District

Population
  - Total: 1,084
- Time zone: UTC+3:00

Dzhalykovo (Russian: Джалыково) is a rural locality (a selo) and the administrative center of Dhalykovskoye rural municipality, Lagansky District, Republic of Kalmykia, Russia. The population was 1,084 as of 2010. Kalmyks make up a majority of the population, with ethnic Russians being the most significant minority.

== Sights ==
Dzhalykovo is home to Galsang Xurl, the oldest Buddhist temple in Kalmykia.
