= Khurul =

Buddhist monastery in Kalmyk Lamaism

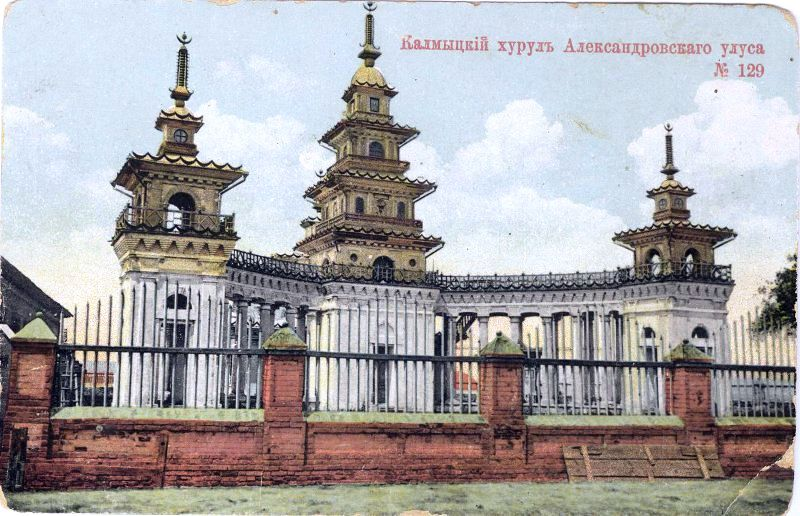
Khosheutovsky khurul

A khurul (Kalmyk: хурул, romanized: khurul; Mongolian: хурэ / хүрээ, romanized: khure / khüree or hure or küriye) is a Buddhist monastery (temple, abode) in Kalmyk (Mongol-Oirat) Lamaism. Some of the most famous Kalmyk khuruls are the Burkhan Bakshin Altan Sume (contemporary) in Elista, Republic of Kalmykia, Russia, and the Khosheutovsky khurul (which was originally in the Kalmyk AO / Kalmyk ASSR, but is now located in Astrakhan Oblast, Russia).

== Etymology and morphology ==
Among Kalmyks and Tuvans, the term khurul (хурул) is the common name for Buddhist monasteries and temples in Kalmykia, Tuva, Mongolia, and Buryatia, though, they have been renamed to datsan in the latter. The word khurul derives from the Mongolian word khure (хурэ, Kalmyk: күрә), which means "circle", "ring", "inclosure", and/or from the Mongolian word khural (хурал) which means "assembly" or "religious service", in a more religious context. The reference to "circles" is explained by the ancient custom of the nomadic people to form circles with their yurts during their stops, with the yurt of the leader being in the center. This formation served a protective purpose in case of a sudden enemy attack. Later, this formation became the standard planning concept for those monasteries.

There are different types of Buddhist monasteries in the Mongolian tradition: khure, sum, and khiid. In her study "Decor in the architecture of Buryat Buddhist temples", Bardanova states that the differentiation of Mongolian monastery types was based on the number of lamas and the status of the institution. Asalkhanova, on the other hand, distinguishes them based on layout and location in her work on "Architectural-spatial and figurative-compositional features of temples of Northern Buddhism".

- Khure — large monasteries, at which the clergy lived permanently. They are located in the steppe and were built in the form of a circle. Ikh-khure, the residence of the Bogd Gegeen, used to be the largest nomadic Khalkha monastery, which later settled and grew to the size of a city (now: the capital of Mongolia — Ulaanbaatar). Rinchen used the term "monastic city" to describe khure.
- Sum (Kalmyk: сүм, romanized: süm) or Sume or Syume (Russian: сумэ / сюме) — a small, quadrangular, specialized temple, the laity of which does not live at the site of the temple constantly, gathering only on major holidays; or a separate temple in a large monastery. They are usually dedicated to particular individuals of the Buddhist pantheon and contain sculptures (Russian: бурхан, romanized: burkhan) of said individual. In Kalmykia, these sculptures tend to be made out of wood, while in Buryatia it's common to use wood or metal. Rinchen refers to sum as "temple".
- Khiid (Mongolian: хийд) or Khit (Mongolian: хит) or Kiid (Kalmyk: кийд) — literally: "lonely abode" — are monasteries that are situated on the slopes of high mountains and similarly difficult topographical reliefs. For example, Manjusri Khiid on the south slope of Bogd Khan Mountain and Tövkhön Khiid on the Shireet Ulaan Uul mountain. Khiid are hermitage-like monasteries that are meant for retreats. Rinchen uses the word "monastery" for khiid.

In pre-revolutionary Mongolia, monasteries were most often assigned, as part of their names, the type that characterized them at the time of construction, regardless of current social realities. Nowadays, only khiid in the meaning of "monastery" and sum in the meaning of "temple" are used. In the Russian regions of the settlement of the Mongolian peoples, aside from khurul, the following nomenclature was entrenched and in parts modified in its meaning:

- Datsan (Buryat: дасан, Russian: дацан from Standard Tibetan: གྲྭ་ཚང།) — in Tibet, originally refers to a department, a faculty at a large monastery, where tsannid studies are conducted, or a temple with privileged rights. Among the Buryats, the word has the meaning of "Buddhist monastery" in general. Whereas for Mongols, a datsan is a separate temple attached to a large monastery, not necessarily associated with the educational process. Datsans in Buryatia have the same circular layout as khure.
- Dugan (Buryat: дуган from Standard Tibetan: འདུ་ཁང།, romanized: du-khang — "assembly hall") — a "eukterion" or "shrine" in the understanding of Buryats and Mongols. In Buryatia the word is used interchangeably with sume (Buryat: сумэ), i.e. "temple". It refers to separate buildings, which are attached to a monastery (or are separate temples) and are dedicated to particular deities (e.g., the Medicine Buddha) and/or a particular purpose (e.g., medical studies).

== Background ==
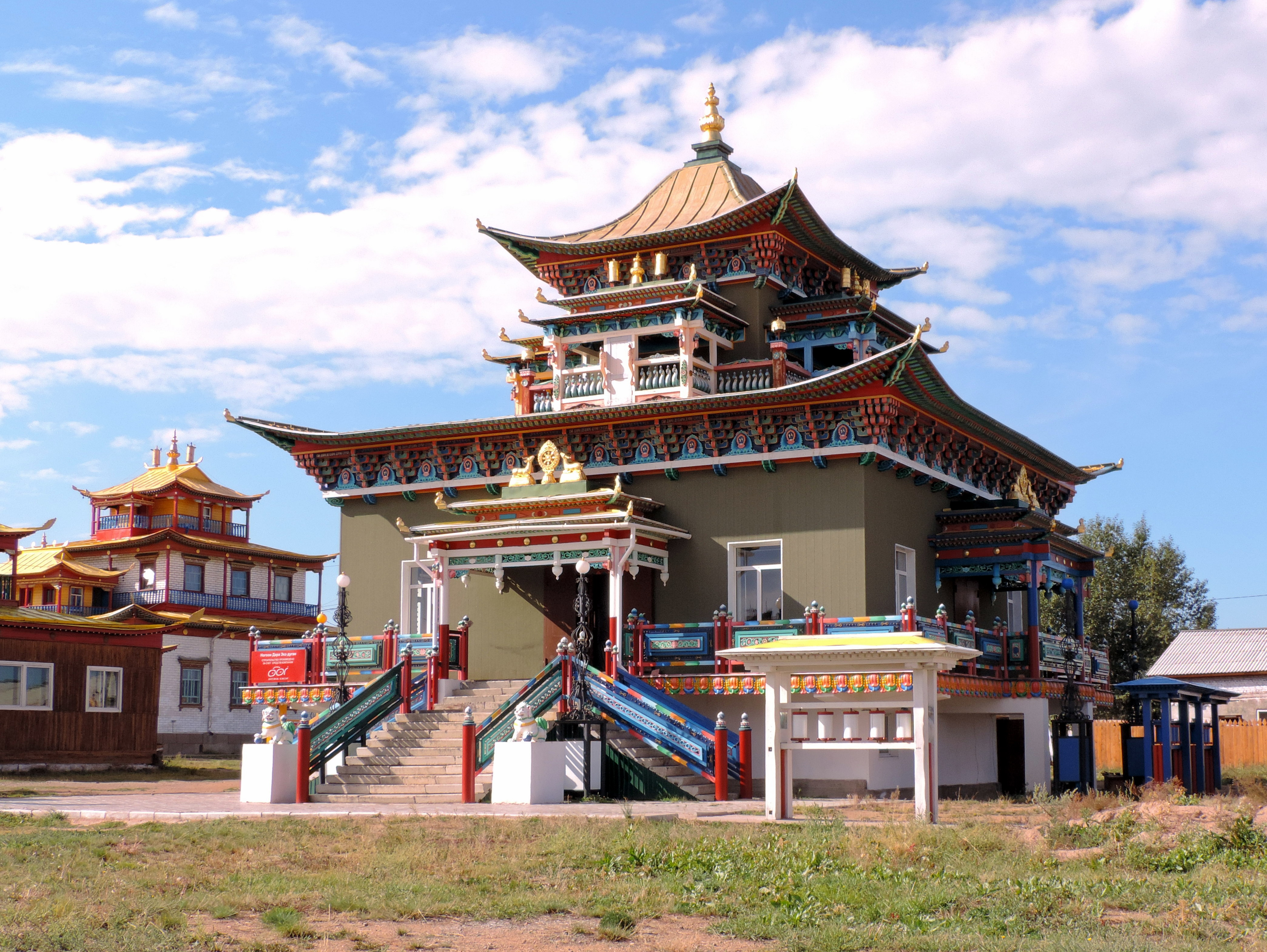
Ivolginsky Datsan

Initially, Buddhism and khuruls were promoted and founded by the lama, and Zaya Pandita, the inventor of Kalmyk writing.

The choice of construction and the place of laying the foundation of khuruls was and still is made by Buddhist monks. In the center of the base of the pit, a sword, a bowl of rice (arshan — alms to the Buddhist gods), and many paper rolls with Buddhist prayers are placed. The set-up is similar to the ceremony of construction and ascension of Buddhist stupas.

Historically, khuruls played an important role in the spiritual and cultural lives of Kalmyks. The monasteries were not only meant as a place of worship, but also as an institution of learning where people would study the Dharma and Indo-Tibetan medicine. Sacred Buddhist texts, books on medicine, and fine ritual accessories were kept in khuruls. A lot of books were imported from Tibet, China, and Mongolia.

With the raise of communism and Stalin's rule, many khuruls were closed, repurposed (e.g., as kindergartens), or even destroyed, due to the ideological struggle against religion. Buryatiya had 34 datsans by 1846, but by 1935 about one third of them were emptied because the clergy fled or was repressed. One year later, more than two thirds of all Buryatian datsans were closed, and the lamas expelled based on accusations of treason and espionage. In Kalmykia, 79 khuruls were closed down between the years 1917 and 1937. Tuva, as an "independent" state since 1921, was spared until 1929, but then the Communist Party started to systematically arrest lamas and monks. A lot of khuruls in Tuva and Kalmykia were burned down. It wasn't until the 1940s that the repression eased, and a new Buddhist temple — Ivolginsky Datsan — was built in the Ivolginsky District, in Buryatia. Restorations of destroyed temples and constructions of new temples began in the period of Perestroika. Nowadays, there are about 22 khuruls in Kalmykia, 16 in Tuva, and more than 30 in Buryatia. Some Buddhist centers can also be found in big cities like Moscow and Saint-Petersburg, and some eastern regions of Russia, for example, in Altai Republic and Zabaykalsky Krai.

== Practices ==
=== General rules ===
When visiting a khurul, it is important to wear decent clothes: the clothes should neither be too revealing nor provocative. This not only applies to women, but also to men, for whom, for example, it is not appropriate to wear shorts or too revealing shirts when visiting. Furthermore, it is not allowed to visit in an intoxicated state. It is recommended to not consume alcohol for at least one day before visiting a khurul. One should also refrain from smoking for at least a few hours before the visit. The reason for this is that the smell of alcohol and cigarettes is, on the one hand, disliked by the deities, and on the other hand, can lead to punishment by those deities that have not yet reached enlightenment, according to Lodoi, the administrator of Burkhan Bakshin Altan Sume.

=== Paying respect and performing Ergts ===
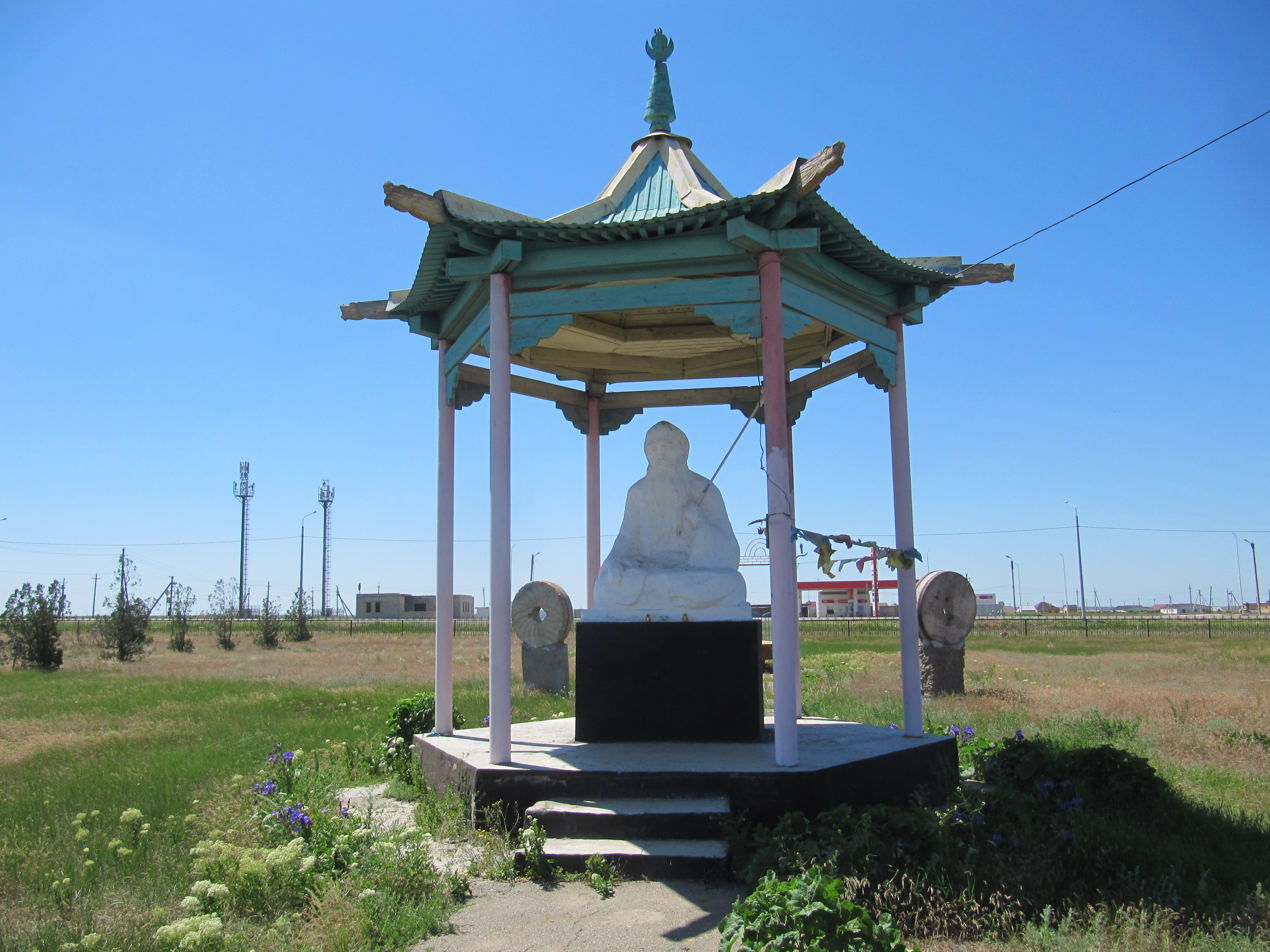
The Tsagan Aav statue of Troitsky Urzhin Nuutsn Tyarni Sume

When entering the courtyard of a khurul, it is custom to bow three times before the khurul and thus before its deities. To do so, the hands are put together into a position, where the thumbs touch each other and are folded into the palm ('lotus bud' mudra). In this position, the hands first touch the top of the head, then the forehead, next the throat (or mouth), and the chest, and finally one bows. The hand gestures are meant as karmic seals to achieve the same enlightenment as Buddha one day. They represent the Ushnisha, Urna, the speech of Buddha, and the enlightened mind of Buddha.

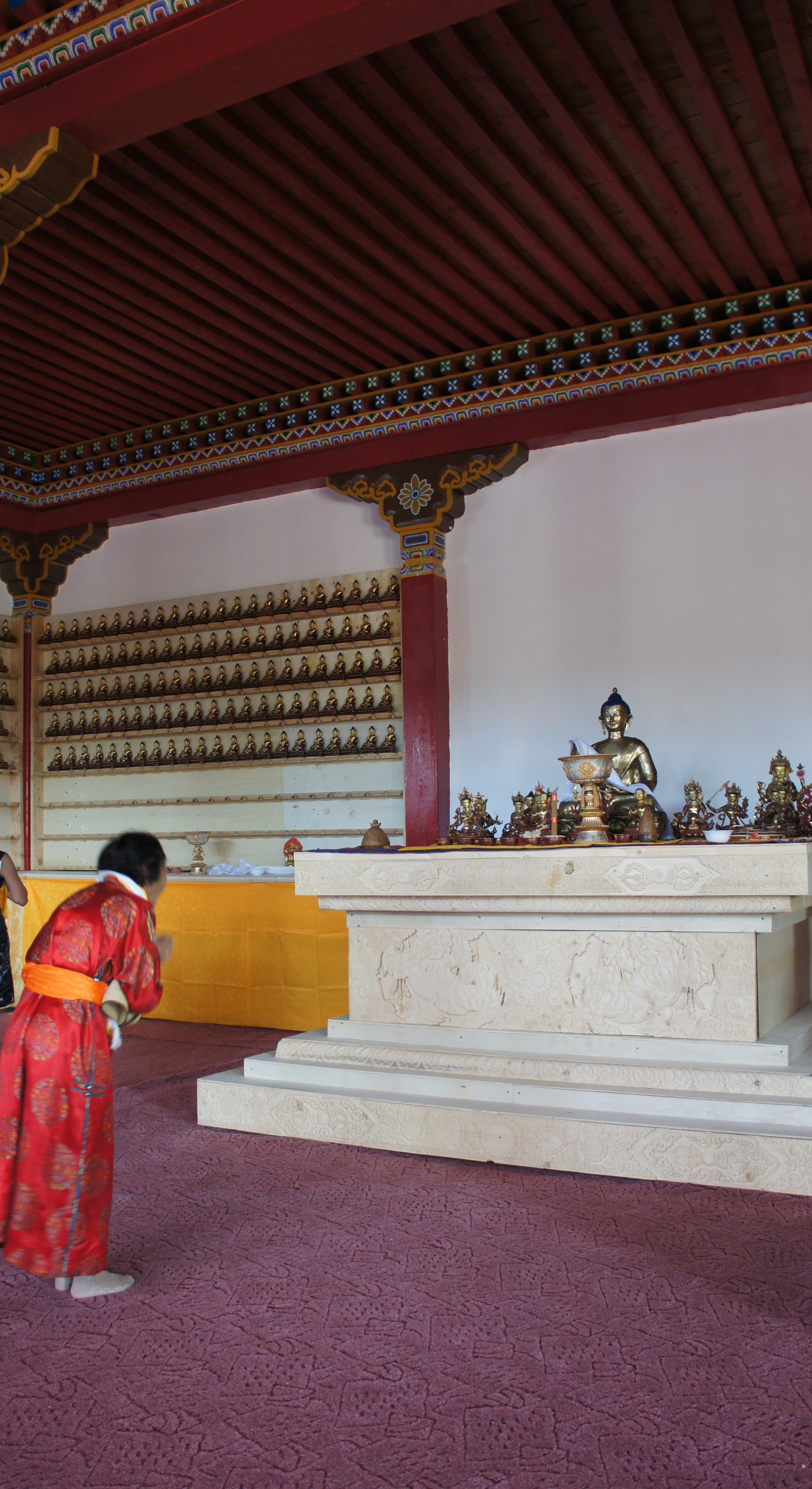
A worshipper praying barefoot

After bowing before the khurul, the visitor proceeds to the statue of Tsagan Aav, if there is one, and bows before the statue to appease the lords of the locality and the lords of the place one lives at. Following tradition, it is then necessary to walk around the khurul clockwise before entering it. This practice is called ergts (Kalmyk: эргц, Mongolian: эргех / эргэцэх, lit. to walk around smth. [clockwise as a sign of respect]). During the 'big' ergts (i.e., walk around the 'outer' circle), one stops at every statue that surrounds the khurul to bow before it and to then walk around it clockwise. This creates a karmic bond to the teachers who are represented by such statues. Prayer wheels (Kalmyk: кюрдэ, romanized: kyurde) along the walk are to be spun clockwise, as well. Those wheels contain thousands of mantras and spinning them not only equals reading them all but also strengthens any prayer one does. To multiply the effect, one can repeat the ergts several times. Monks traditionally walk around the khurul three, seven, or twenty one times for this purpose. Once the 'big' ergts is completed, one proceeds with the 'small' ergts (i.e., walk around the 'inner' circle which is right around the khurul). Once again, the prayer wheels on this walk are spun clockwise. After finishing the ergts one can enter the khurul. Before entering, though, it is necessary to take of one's shoes and any headgear.

Inside the main prayer hall, a prostration is performed in front of the Buddha. There are two ways of prostration: a full one and none-full one.

- Full prostration: the hands are put in the 'lotus bud' mudra position and go from touching the top of the head, to the forehead, to the throat, and to the chest. All this is done while visualizing that one is bowing before the living Buddha himself. When doing those gestures, one can utter a mantra. For example:

Original Kalmyk Oirat

Ламд Мүргмү
Бурхнд Мүргмү
Номд Мүргмү
Бурсң Хувргт Мүргмү

Romanized

Lamd Mürgmü
Burkhnd Mürgmü
Nomd Mürgmü
Bursñ Khuvrgt Mürgmü

English translation

Worshipping the Teacher
Worshipping Buddha
Worshipping Dharma
Worshipping Sangha

After the hand gesture, one kneels down, touches the ground with one's palms, stretches out with the full body on the ground, touching the ground with one's forehead, and then quickly gets up again.

- Non-full prostration: this is done if someone for some reason cannot perform the full prostration (e.g., due to health issues). It follows the same pattern as the full prostration, except that it is not necessary to stretch out completely on the ground, but instead one performs a "five point touch", where one kneels and bows down to the ground, so that the knees, palms, and forehead touch the ground.

After this the believer is permitted to proceed to the altair section where the throne and image of the Dalai Lama are located. There, one can place one's khadak (Kalmyk: хадак / хадг) on the throne and then perform another three bows. For these bows, one does the forementioned hand gestures and then touches the throne with one's forehead while bowing to receive blessings. One can then go up the altair section and perform further ritual bowings before the other deities of the khurul.

Kalmyks also have a tradition of never turning their backs towards the images of the deities and Buddha inside a khurul, that's why a lot of people leave the altair section somewhat walking backwards. But, accoroding to Lodoi, the monks of the khurul recommend to not be too strict about this rule and to walk normally for safety reasons, because in their opinion the mind and attitude of the worshipper is more important than such symbolism. As long as worshippers have the right motivation and show respect towards Buddha in their mind, they have nothing to fear from turning their back towards the deities. Lodoi also points out, that there are usually paintings of deities on all sides of the khurul and it is therefore impossible to never face them with one's back.

Before leaving the khurul, one can once again bow before Buddha, and then walk out.

=== Prayers and the ritual of Serdzhim ===
There can be daily prayers in some khuruls. The khuruls are not closed for those prayers and people are welcome to join them, if they wish. The prayers concern topics like well-being, health, longevity, and appeasements to the deities. During those prayers, the monks perform a special ritual called serdzhim (Kalmyk: серджим). In the ritual, a "Golden Drink", which is brought in by the worshippers, is offered to the tutelary deities. In Kalmykia, the drink, called serdzhim, is a strongly-brewed black tea. In Buryatia, the drink is called serzhem (Buryat: сэржэм / сержем) and can be either freshly-brewed tea, milk, vodka, or another liquid, depending on regional traditions. The tea is poured in a special container and then used by the monks as an offer to the deities during the ritual.

Aside from such daily prayers, there are also occasional prayers or other regularly recurring prayers. One such prayer is yoryâl (Kalmyk: йорял), also called "memorial service" (поминальная служба) in Russian, though, the Russian term isn't completely accurate as the purpose of the service isn't commemoration. Instead, the monks recite special benevolent, well-wishing prayers for the deceased during yoryâl, so that the deceased would live a good life following their reincarnation.

Furthermore, there are prayers for certain deities on certain days (e.g., for the Tara, the Medicine Buddha, etc.).

The monks' prayers are for the well-being of all worshippers and all living beings, but if someone needs the monks to pray for them individually, then this can be done by writing down the name of the person on the prayer sheet. The monks will then stand up during the prayers and read out those names.

=== Offerings ===
It is also custom to make offerings in khuruls. There are various types of offerings, such as light in the form of lampadas, scent in the form of insence sticks, flowers, food items and drinks, and so on.

== List of khuruls and sumes ==
=== Kalmykia ===
Elista

- Burkhan Bakshin Altan Sume
- Geden Sheddup Choikorling Monastery
- Samye Tinlei Kunkyab Pelbar Ling

Gorodovikovsk

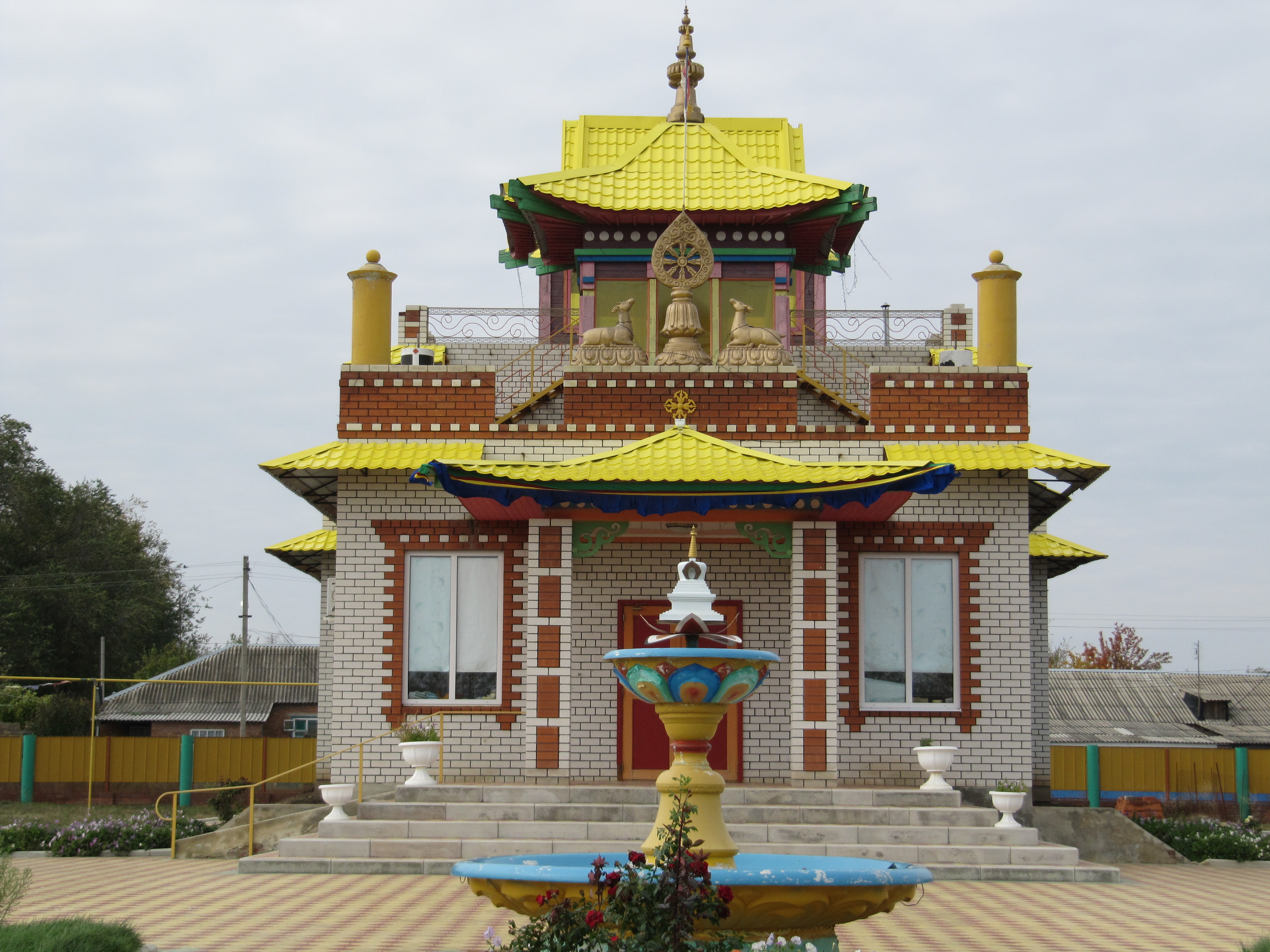
Tantric Monastery of Vladika Tsongkhapa

- Tantric Monastery of Vladika Tsongkhapa

Iki-Burulsky District

- Iki-Burulsky Khurul "Orgyen Samye Ling"
- Baga-Burulsky Khurul
- Khomutnikovsky Khurul "Tashi Lkhunpo" (Таши Лхунпо) (ruins)
- Orgakinsky Khurul "Bogdo Dalai Lamin Rashi Lunpo"

Ketchenerovsky District

- Altsyn-Khutinsky Khurul
- Godzhursky Khurul
- Sarpinsky Khurul "Sera Tosam Ling"
- Shin Mer Khurul

Lagansky District

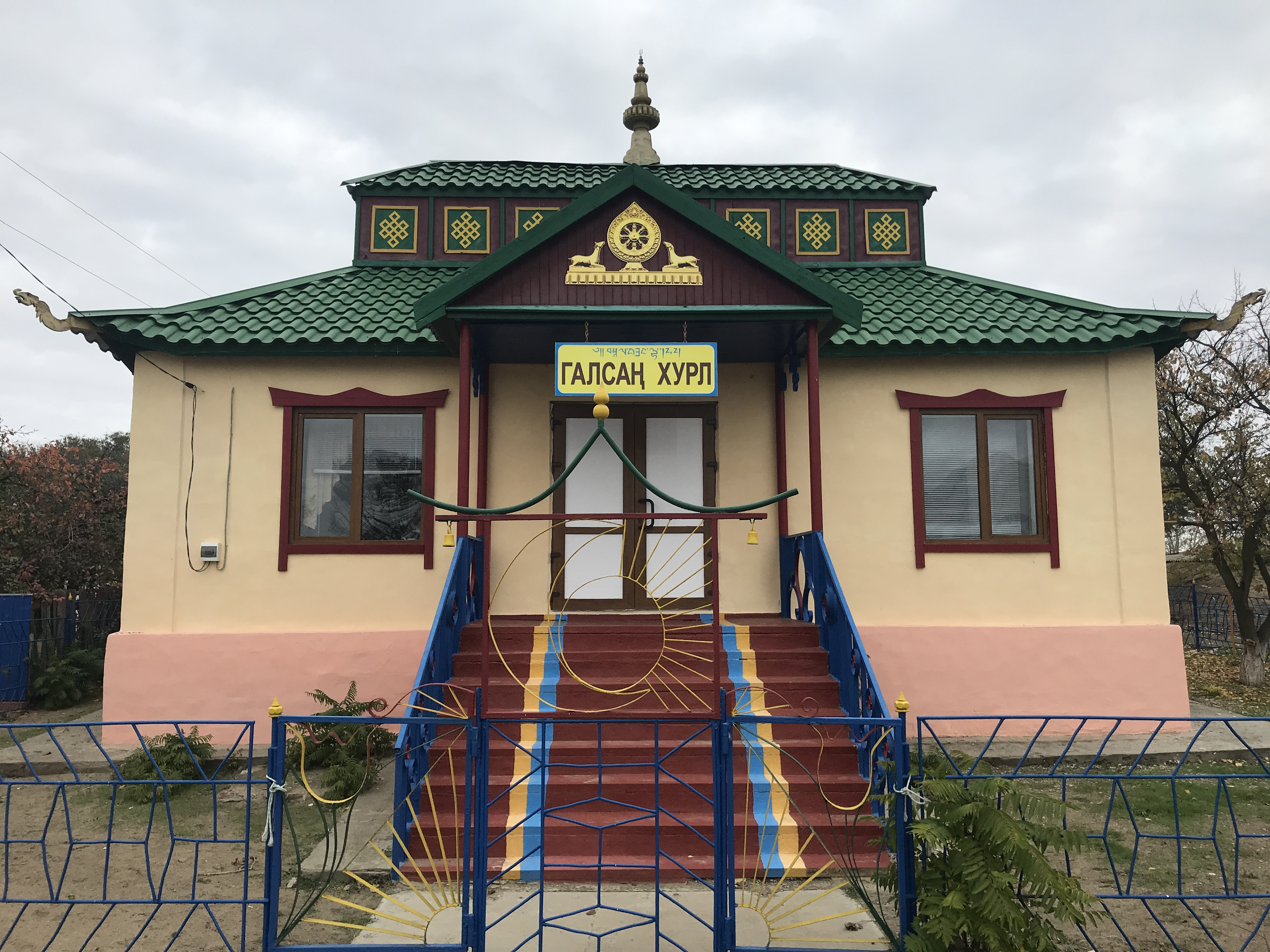
Galsan Khurul

- Ulankholsky Tsagan-Khurul
- Lagan Dargyeling Khurul
- Galsan Khurul in Dzhalykovo

Maloderbetovsky District

- Maloderbetovsky Khurul

Oktyabrsky District

- Aldr Diilvrin Syume
- Tashi Gomang

Priyutnensky District

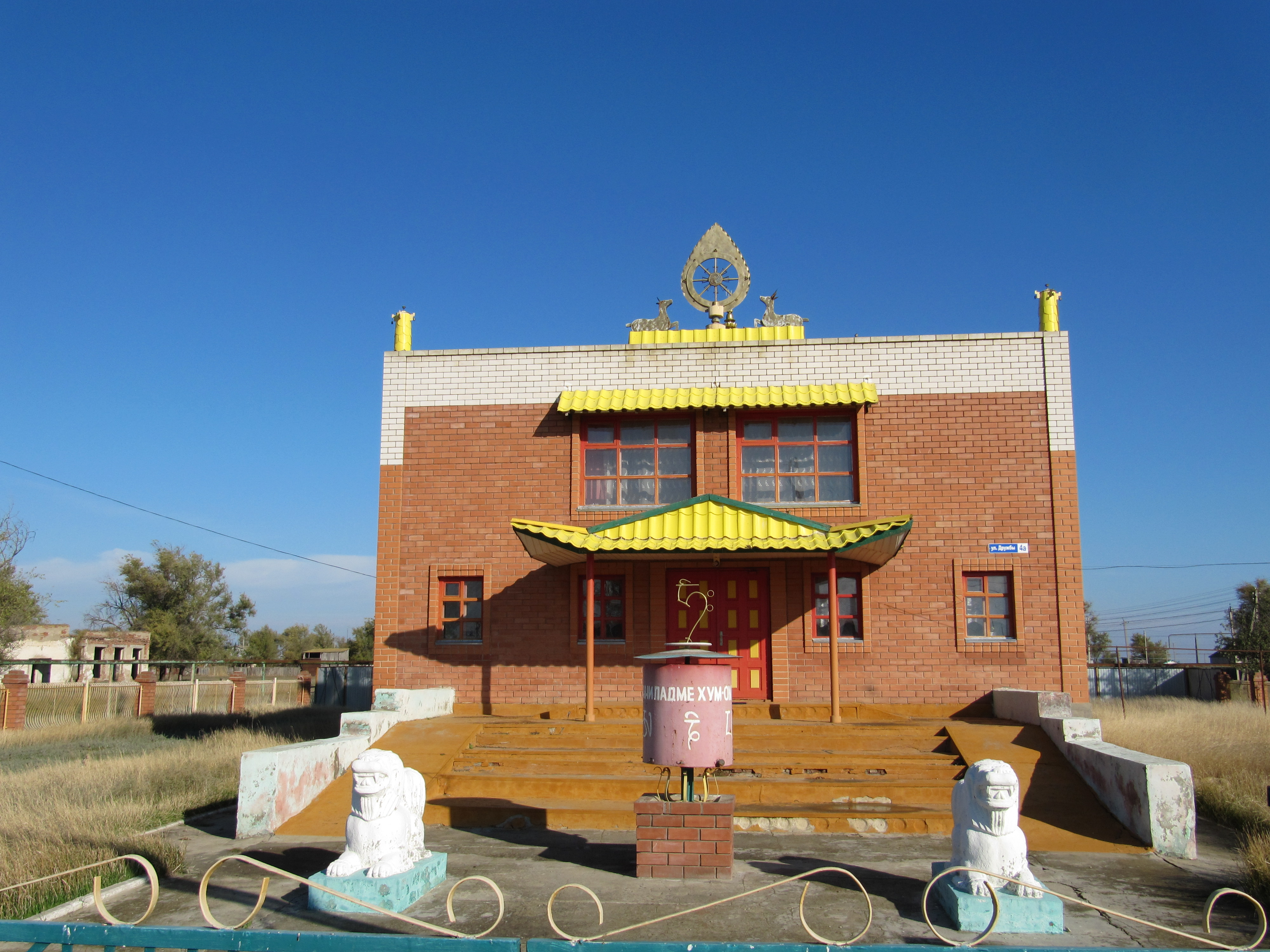
Uldyuchinsky Khurul

- Uldyuchinsky Khurul

Sarpinsky District

- Arshan-Zelmensky Iki-Khurul

Tselinny District

- Khar-Buluksky Khurul "Bogdokhinsky"
- Troitsky Urzhin Nuutsn Tyarni Sume
- Nayntakinovsky Khurul
- Choyorya-Khurul
- Baga-Chonosovsky Khurul

Chernozemelsky District

- Tsekertinsky Khurul in the village of Burovoy
- Komsomolsky Khurul
- Arteziansky Khurul
- Adykovsky Khurul

Yustinsky District

- Tsagan Amansky Khurul "Tugmyud-gavdzhi"
- Kharbinsky Khurul

Yashaltinsky District

- Yashaltinsky Khurul (in construction)

Yashkulsky District

- Yashkulsky Khurul

=== Tuva ===
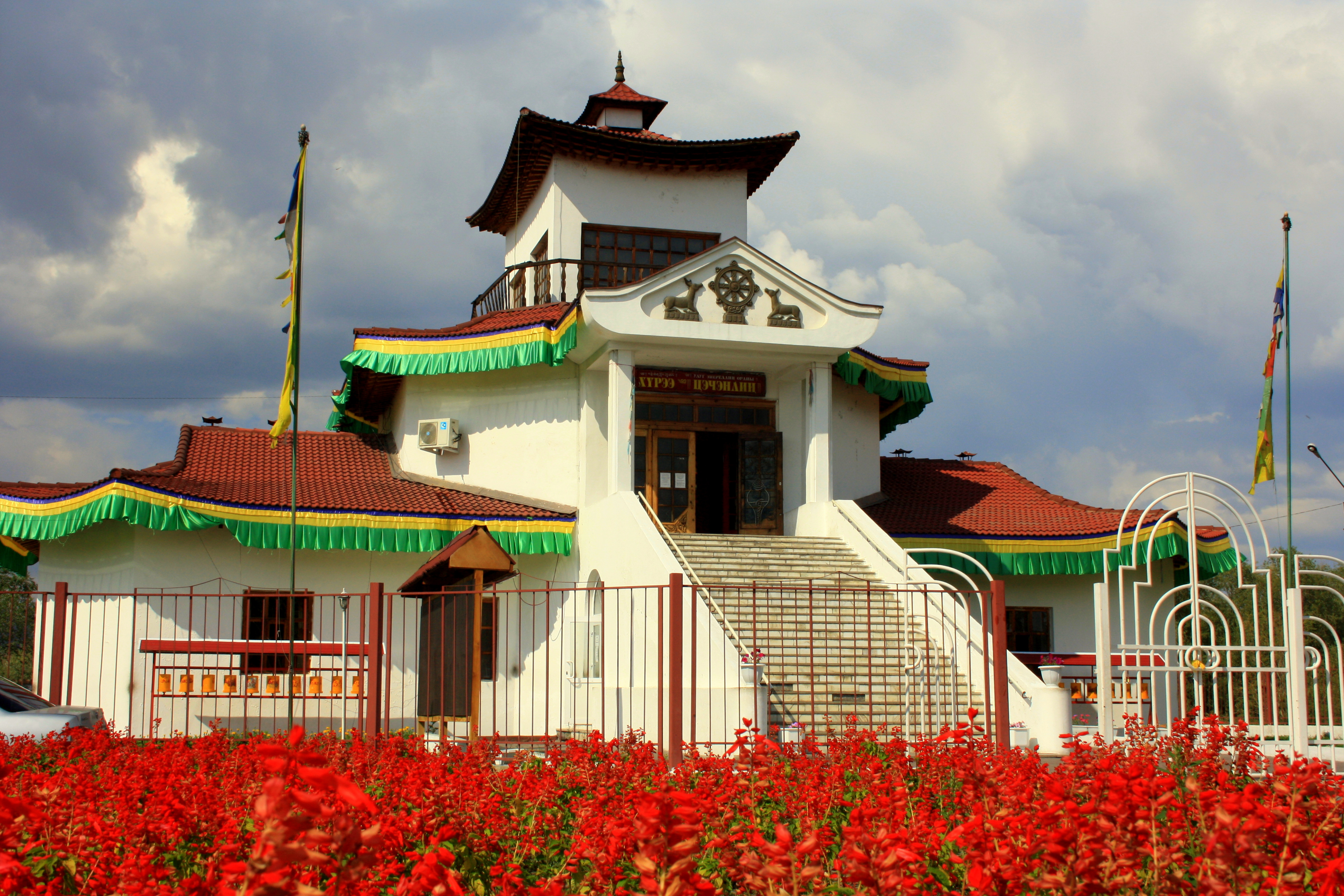
Khuree Tsechenling in Kyzyl

- Ustuu-Khuree
- Tsechenling Khuree
- Thubten Shedrub Ling (Тубтен Шедруб Линг)

=== Buryatia ===
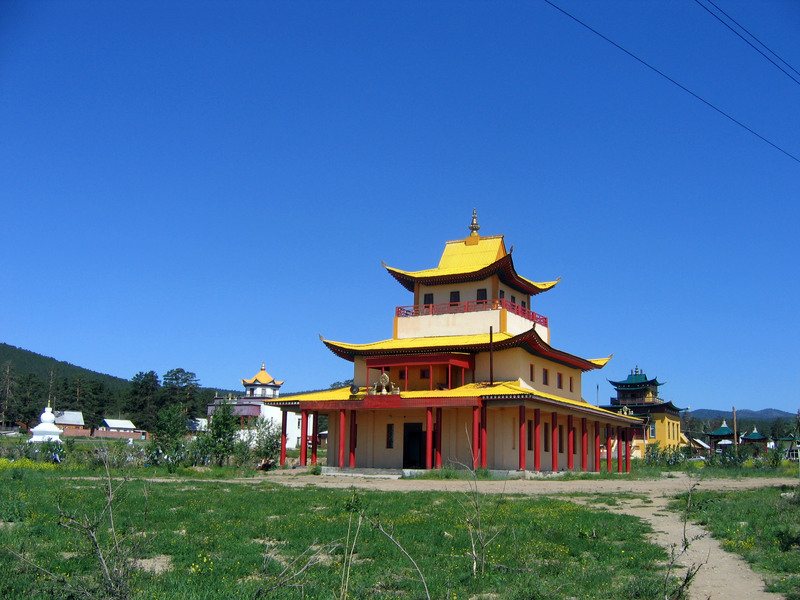
Hambyn-Hure Datsan in Ulan-Ude

- Khambyn Khure / Hambyn-Hure Datsan

=== Astrakhan Oblast ===
- Khosheutovsky khurul (used to be on the territory of the Kalmyk AO / Kalmyk ASSR but is now located in Astrakhan Oblast)
- Limansky Khurul (used to be on the territory of the Kalmyk AO / Kalmyk ASSR but is now located in Astrakhan Oblast)
- Kerede khurul in Vostochnoye

=== Altai Republic ===
- Kuree-Datsan "Ak-Burkhan" in Gorno-Altaysk

=== United States of America ===
- Kalmyk Hurul of Saint Zonkava in Philadelphia

=== Mongolia ===
- Choijin Lama Sum
- Zayiin Gegeen Khiid
- Amarbayasgalant Khiid
- Khamar Khiid
- Ongiin Khiid
- Baldan Bereeven Khiid

== See also ==
- Datsan
- Buddhism in Kalmykia
- Buddhism in Buryatia
- Buddhism in Tuva
- Buddhism in Russia
