= Vostochnoye, Astrakhan Oblast =

Vostochnoye Восточное
- Selo
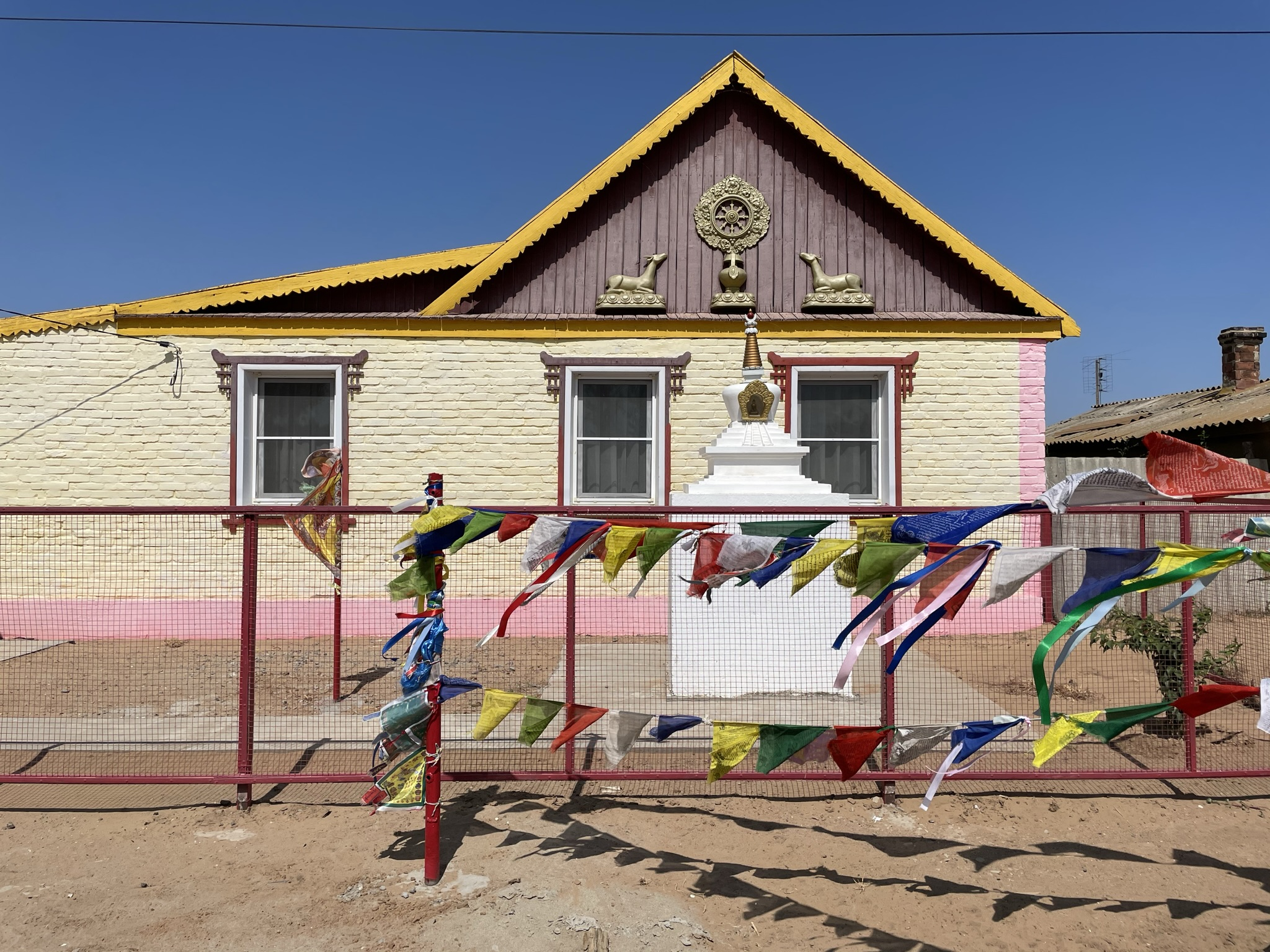
- Kalmyk khurul (Buddhist temple) in Vostochnoye

- Location within Astrakhan Oblast Location within Russia
- Coordinates: 46°07′N 47°40′E
- Country: Russia
- Region: Astrakhan Oblast
- District: Ikryaninsky District
- Time zone: UTC+4:00

Восточное (Russian: Восточное) is a rural locality (a selo) and the administrative center of Vostochny Selsoviet of Ikryaninsky District, Astrakhan Oblast, Russia. The population was 767 as of 2010. There are 15 streets.

== Geography ==
Vostochnoye is located 16 km northwest of Ikryanoye (the district's administrative centre) by road. Dzhamba is the nearest rural locality.

== History ==
Vostochnoye was founded by Kalmyk settlers in the 1930s. Its original name was Kisin-Sharburbä. After all ethnic Kalmyks were forcibly resettled to Siberia in 1943 by Joseph Stalin, it got its current name derived from the Russian word for "Eastern".

In 2021, the local Kalmyk community composed of those who managed to return from the Siberian exile finished the construction of a Buddhist temple (khurul).

== Gallery ==
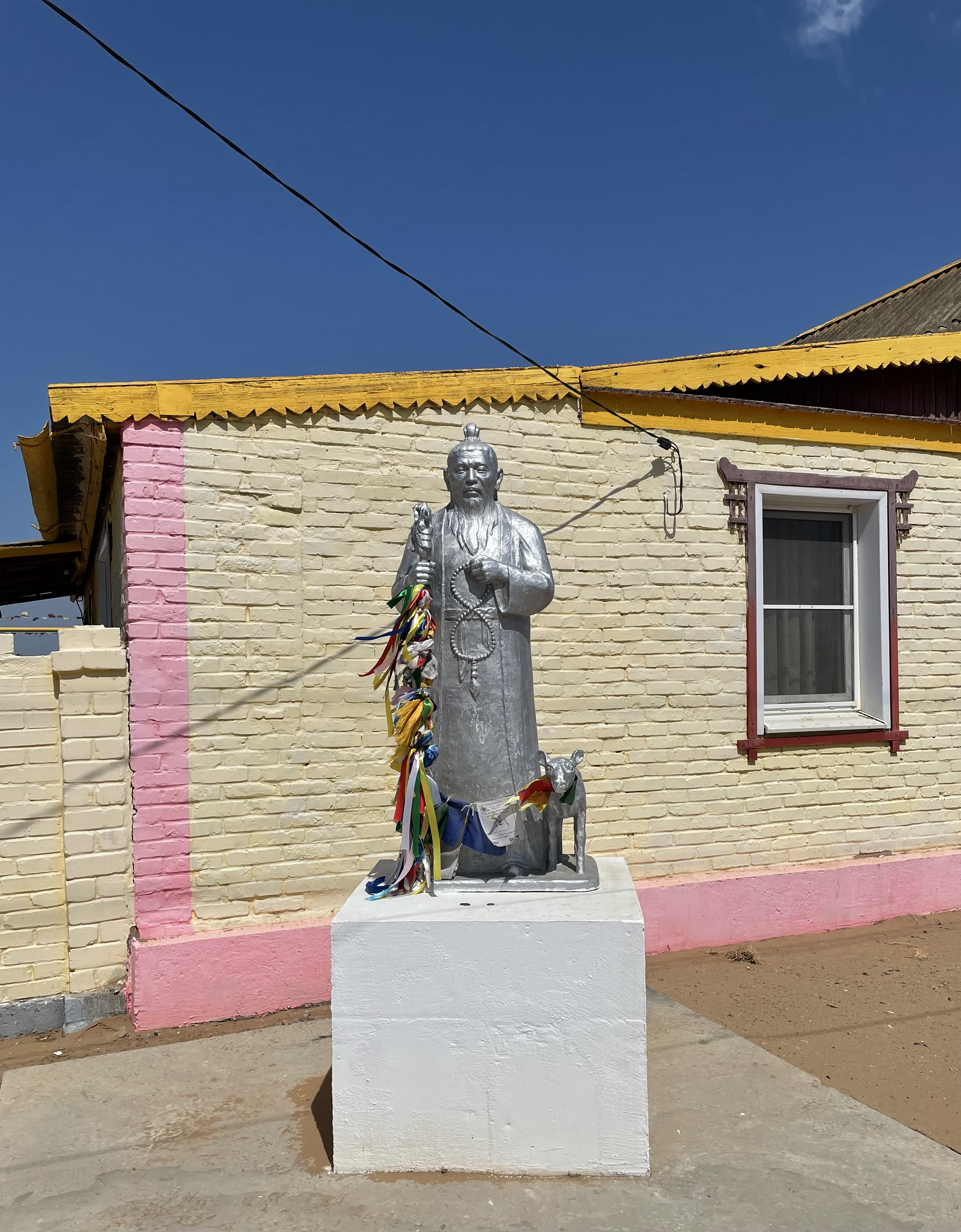
Statue near the Kalmyk khurul

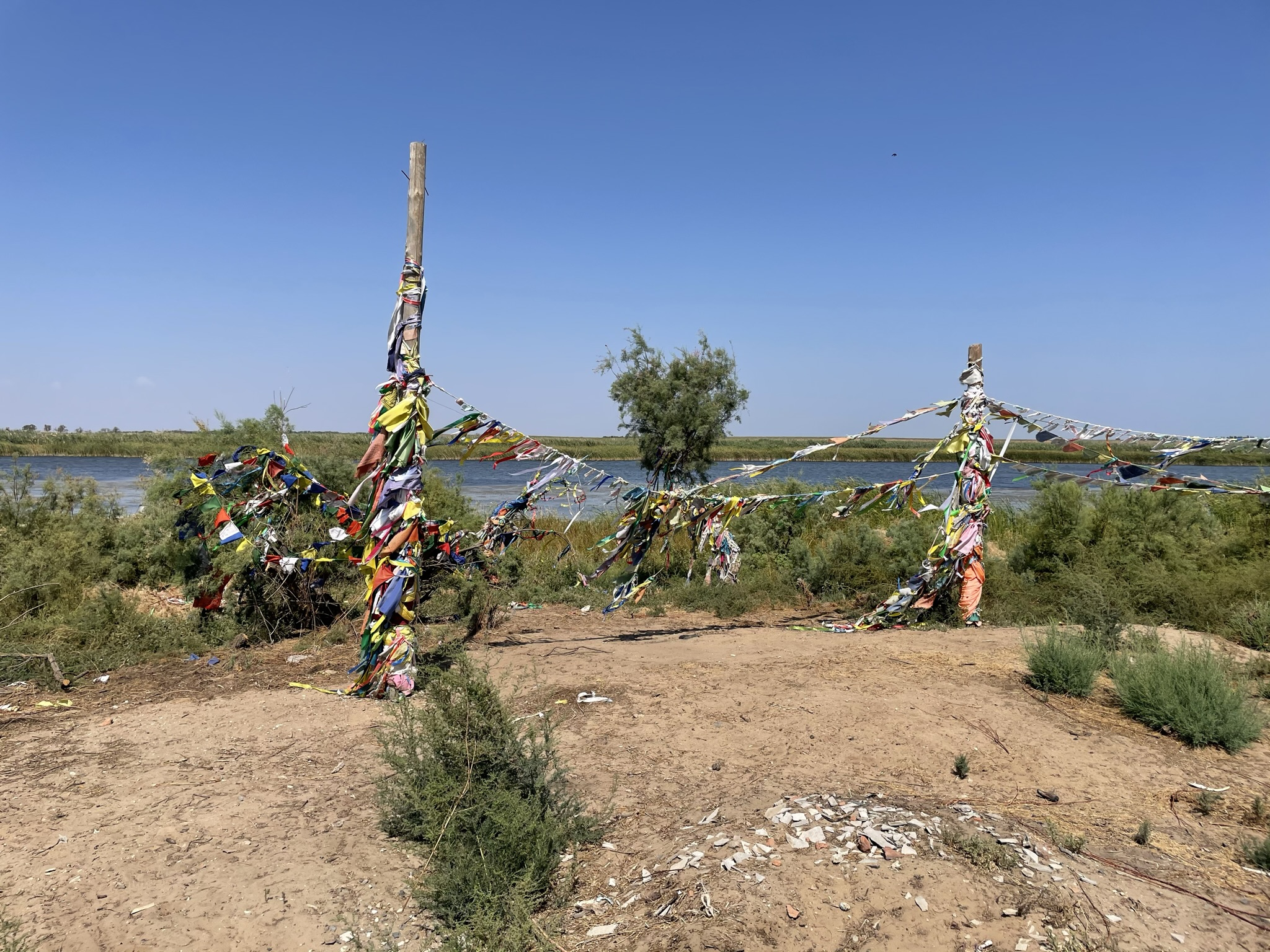
Buddhist flags and ribbons by Lake Golga

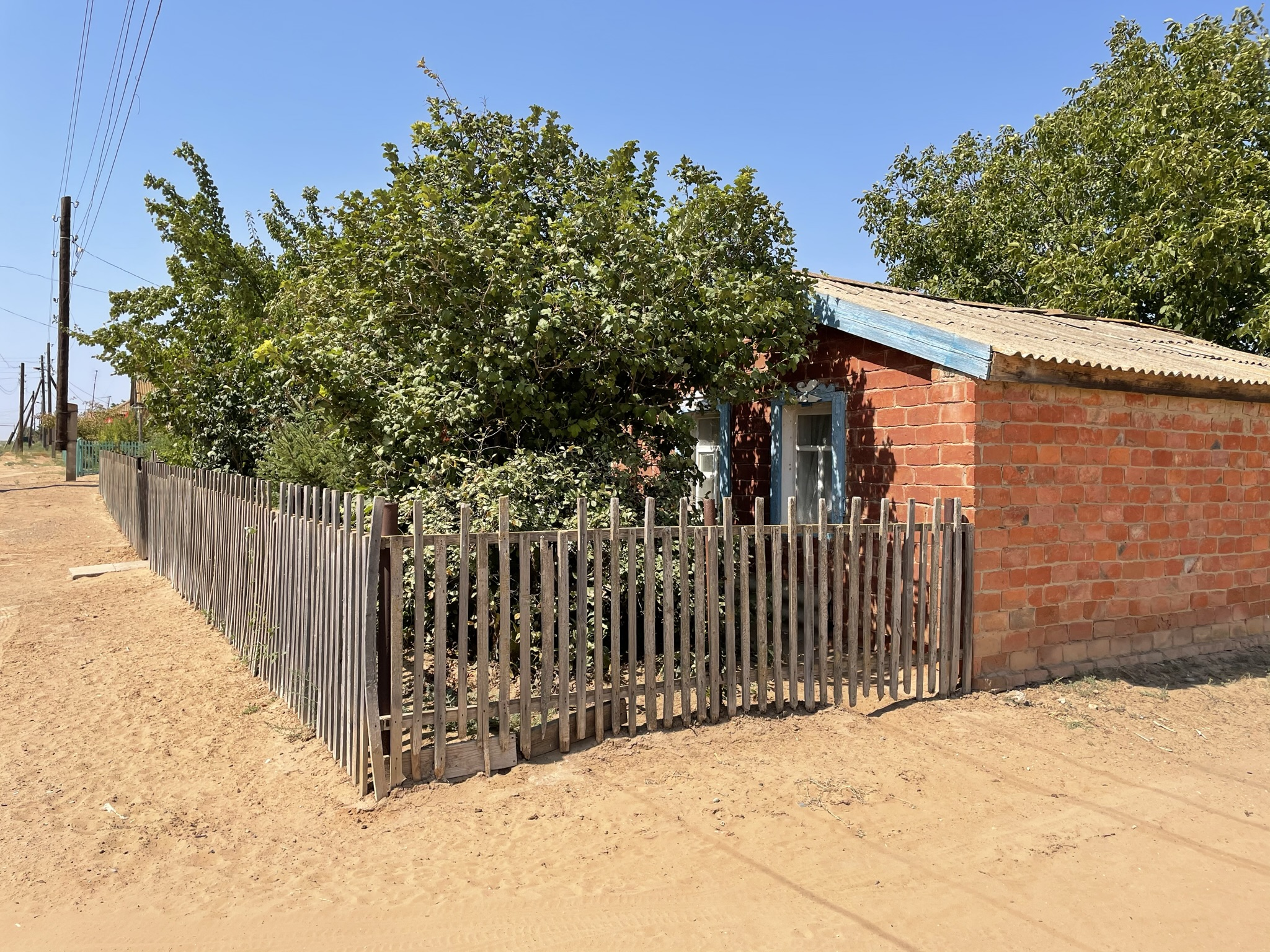
Brick house on Mira Street

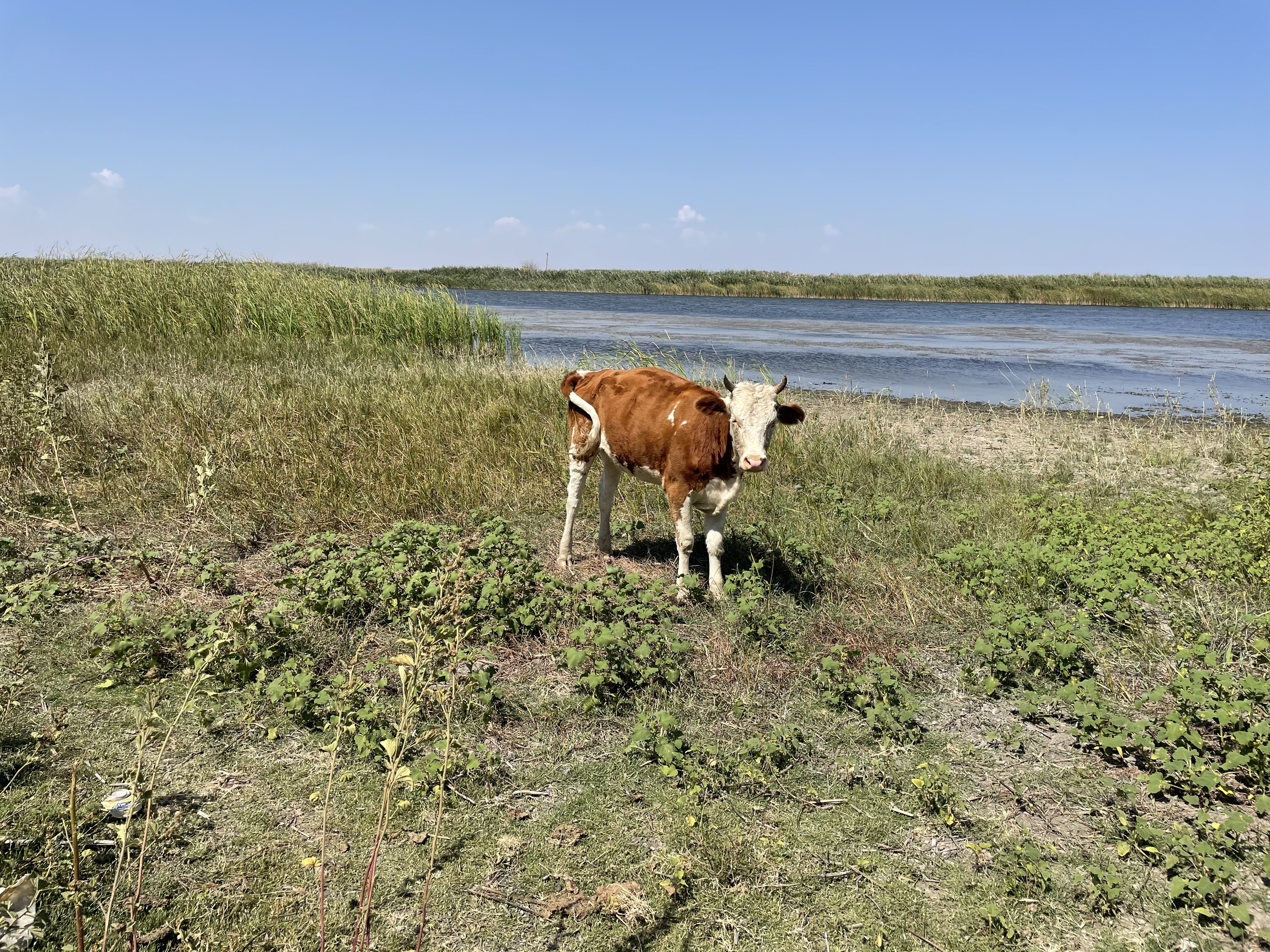
Lake Golga
