= Ongi Monastery =

Two monasteries in Saikhan-Ovoo, Dundgovi, Mongolia

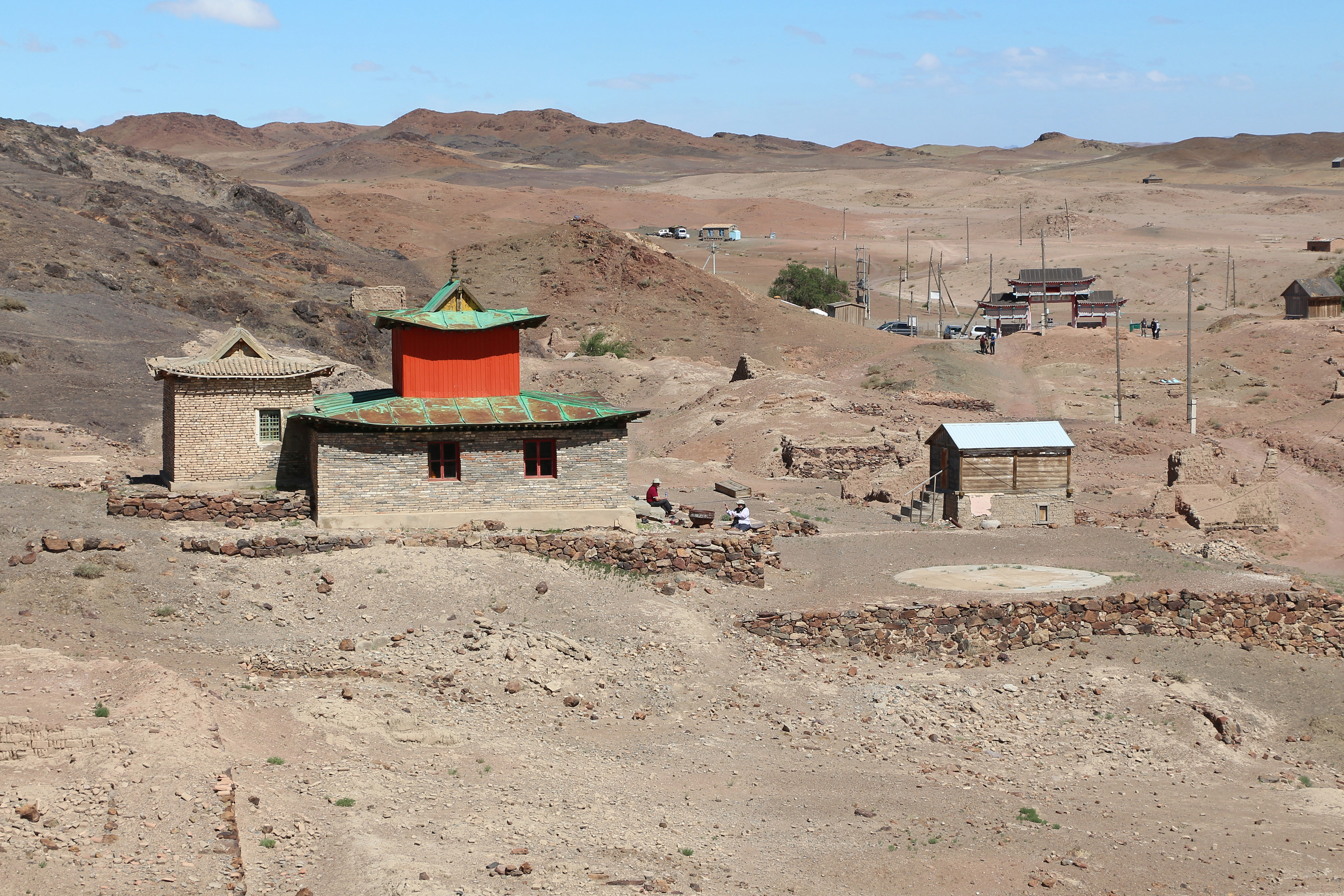

- Location within Mongolia

Religion
- Affiliation: Tibetan Buddhism

Location
- Location: Saikhan-Ovoo, Dundgovi, Mongolia
- Interactive map of Ongi Monastery
- Coordinates: 45°20′23.31″N 104°0′15.4″E

Architecture
- Style: Chinese, Mongol and Tibetan influences
- Established: 1660

Ongi Monastery (Mongolian: Онгийн хийд, Ongiin Khiid) is the collective name for the ruins of two monasteries that face each other across the Ongi River in Saikhan-Ovoo district of Dundgovi Province, in south-central Mongolia. The Barlim Monastery is located on the north bank of the river while the Khutagt Monastery sits on the south bank. The older southern complex consisted of various administrative buildings as well as 11 temples. The northern complex, built in the 18th century, consisted of 17 temples – among them one of the largest temples in all of Mongolia. The grounds housed also four (4) Buddhist universities. Founded in 1660, it was one of the largest monasteries in Mongolia and housed over 1000 monks at its height. The ruins are situated about 18 km south of the town of Saikhan Ovoo.

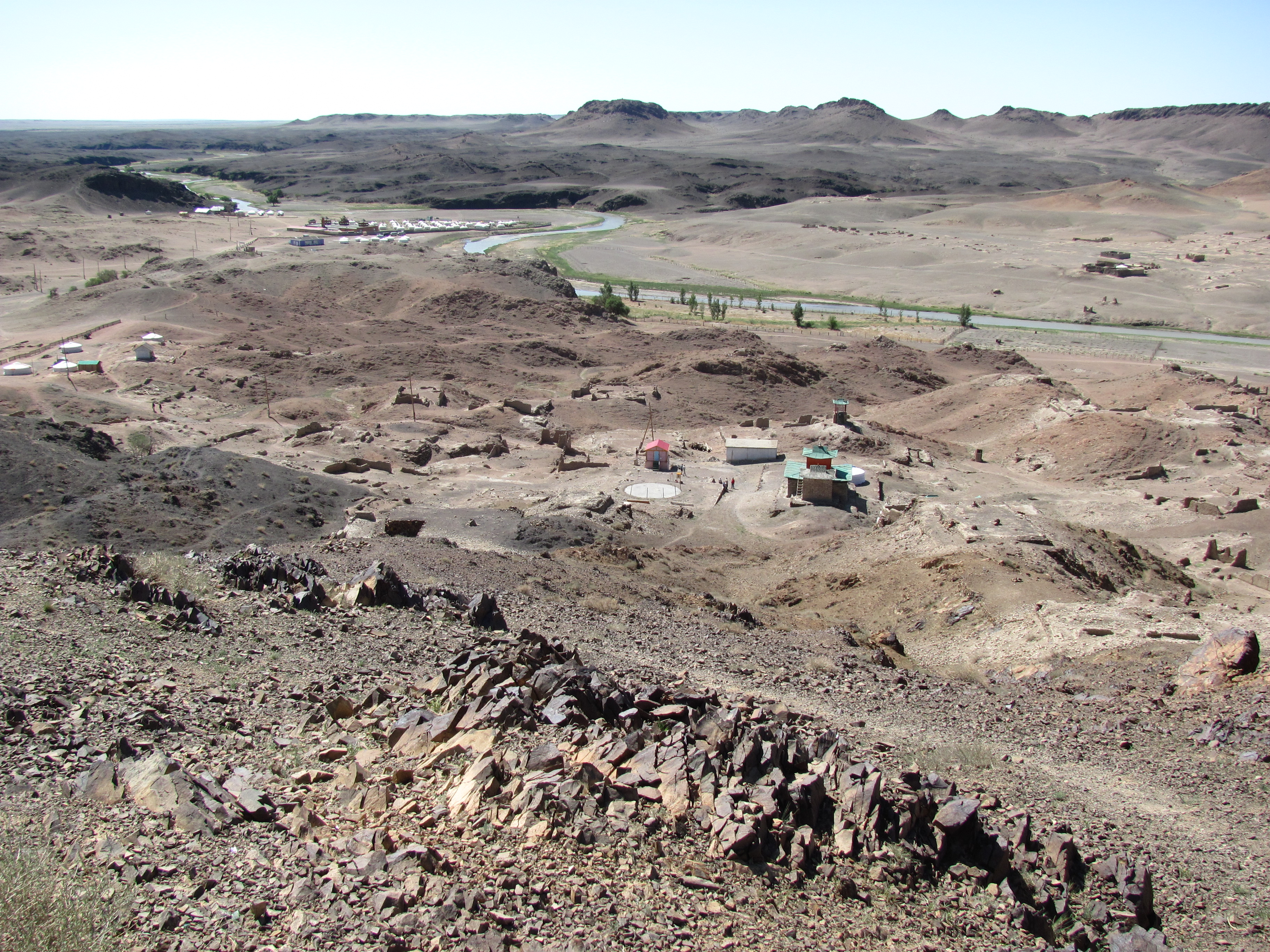
Ruins of Ongi Monastery and the Ongi River

Both complexes of Ongi Monastery were completely destroyed in 1939 during anti-religious purges carried out under Khorloogiin Choibalsan, the leader of the Communist Party of Mongolia. Over 200 monks were killed, and many surviving monks were imprisoned or forcibly laicized and conscripted into the Communist controlled army.

A large number of ruins including a tall stupa can be seen on the river and on the surrounding hills. In the 1990s, it was decided to rebuild the monastery. The first temple was inaugurated in 2004. There is a small museum in a ger in front of it. One of the stupas has just been reconstructed as well. It has a commemorative plaque indicating the names of the monks who were killed in 1939.
