= Geden Sheddup Choikorling Monastery =

Buddhist Monastery in Elista, Russia

Geden Sheddup Choikorling
- Сәкүсн-сүм
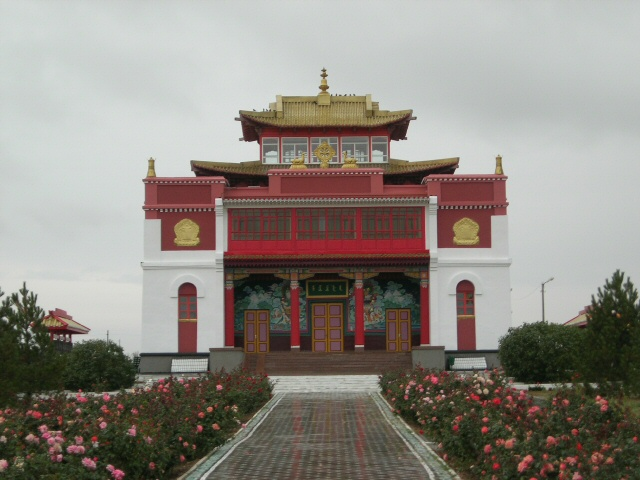

- Location within Kalmykia

Monastery information
- Other names: Russian: Сякюсн-сюме, romanized: Syakyusn-syume; Kalmyk: Сәкүсн-сүм, romanized: Säküsn-süm ("Guardian Temple")
- Order: Gelug
- Denomination: Buddhism
- Established: 1996
- Mother house: Burkhan Bakshin Altan Sume

People
- Founder: 14th Dalai Lama

Architecture
- Architect: Russian: Владимир Бадмаевич Гиляндиков, romanized: Vladimir Badmaevich Gilyandikov
- Style: Tibetan Buddhist architecture

Site
- Location: 6 km from Elista, near the village Arshan, Republic of Kalmykia
- Country: Russia
- Coordinates: 46°17′17.29497″N 44°13′26.36033″E
- Public access: Yes

Geden Sheddup Choikorling Monastery (Russian: Геден Шеддуп Чойкорлинг, Lhasa Tibetan for "Holy Abode of Theory and Practice of the Gelug School", Oirat: Сәкүсн-сүм, Sәküsn-Süm) is a Tibetan Buddhist monastery in Elista, Republic of Kalmykia, Russia. It was opened on 5 October 1996 in the presence of more than 30,000 people and is the first Tibetan Buddhist monastery to be built in the region since its beginning as an autonomous oblast in 1920. The monastery also is the Republic's first Buddhist place of worship since Joseph Stalin ordered the destruction of all Buddhist temples and monasteries during the Collectivization era and the Great Purge in the 1930s.

Geden Sheddup Choikorling is a Tibetan name, translated as "A Holy Abode for Theory and Practice of the School of Gelugpa". This name was given to the monastery by the 14th Dalai Lama who also chose its location – on the steppes just outside the Republic's capital city, Elista, during his first visit to the Republic in the summer of 1991. It contains a statue of the Sakyamuni Buddha.

The monastery is located just outside the city and is surrounded by the steppe.

== History ==
The construction site to the south of Elista was not chosen by chance. The question of building a Kalmyk Khurul (Buddhist monastery- temple) in the city was raised in February 1989 at a meeting of the Khurul Council. At that time, several places were proposed for the construction of the khurul within the city of Elista and beyond. The khurul was supposed to become a center of spiritual education, first and foremost, and this required a sufficiently large area for the construction of educational buildings, so one of the determining factors for choosing a plot of land for the construction of a khurul was the availability of a large free area. As a result, it was decided to build a temple outside the city limits near the village of Arshan.

The construction site was consecrated by the 14th Dalai Lama during his second visit to Kalmykia in September 1992. The construction of the temple took four years and was funded by donations from the inhabitants of the republic and the personal funds of the first President of Kalmykia Kirsan Ilyumzhinov. The building itself was erected in one year.

The khurul was solemnly opened on 5 October 1996. It used to be the largest Buddhist monastery on the territory of Kalmykia until the construction of the Burkhan Bakshin Altan Sume in 2005.

The ceremony of consecrating of the khurul — (Russian: раднэ, romanized: radne) — was performed by the 14th Dalai Lama during his third visit to Kalmykia on 1 December 2004. It is the performance of the radne ceremony in particular that establishes the khurul as a real abode of deities.

== Exterior appearance ==
The temple was built according to the design of the architect V. Gilyandikov. The appearance of the temple is made in the Tibetan style and complemented by

- sculptures by Vladimir Vaskin and P. Usuntsynov,
- paintings by A. Povaev, G. Nurova, D. Vaskina, E. Manzheeva, and
- wood carvings and cult symbols by N. Galushkin and V. Kuberlinov.

The temple is 20 m high, 24 m long, and 19 m wide. The lower part is made in the style typical of Tibetan monasteries, the upper part is made in the traditional style of an eastern two-tier pagoda. The pediment of the facade of the temple is decorated with a sculpture of Dharmachakra — the Wheel of Teaching. On the sides, there are two fallow deer, the listeners of the first sermon of Buddha.

At the entrance to the temple, there are prayer wheels (Kalmyk: кюрдэ, romanized: kyurde) that rotate clockwise when entering and exiting. On the territory of the Geden Sheddup Choikorling Monastery, there are, in addition to the syume, a house for lamas, and three suburgans.

Alley of roses	Prayer wheels "Kyurde"	Keeper of secrets

== Interior ==
On the ground floor there are

- a vestibule with three entrance doors (mandatory attributes above the entrance are fallow deer, and Lokapalas on the doors),
- a large prayer hall,
- an altar, and
- a large gilded statue of Sakyamuni Buddha (3.5 m high) in the center of the altar by sculptor Vladimir Vaskin.

The Buddha is sitting in a lotus position. He is holding a bowl — patra — in his left hand, while his right hand is lowered in a traditional gesture. The hair being put up into a Ushnisha bun, elongated earlobes, and a Urna (in the form of a large precious stone) are the features of the Enlightened One. In the center hangs the banner of Geoltsin — a symbol of Buddha Sakyamuni's victory over the five senses.

The wall paintings were made in accordance with the traditional Buddhist canons of temple painting. To the left and right of the Buddha statue, there are panels with images of deities: on the left — deities that give longevity — the red Amitayus, White Tara and Usnisavijaya; on the right — the four-armed Avalokiteśvara, the bodhisattva of compassion, Vajrapani, the guardian of faith, the patron of the Mongolian peoples, and Manjushri, the bodhisattva of wisdom. In the prayer part in the center, Tsongkhapa is depicted with two students — Gyaltsab and Khedrup. He has lotus flowers in his hands, on which lie the attributes of Manjushri. The coming Buddha Maitreya is depicted at the top. At the bottom, on the right, is a monk with fans and other attributes of faith. The figures are connected with each other by white-pink clouds. In the depths of the altar part of the temple, there are statues of the main deities of the Buddhist pantheon: the Taras — the merciful helpers of the bodhisattva Avalokiteśvara, the figures of the guardians of faith.

The second floor includes a library, rooms for meditation, and private reception rooms.

== See also ==
- Khurul — the Kalmyk term for Buddhist monasteries
- Buddhism in Kalmykia
- Buddhism in Russia
- Burkhan Bakshin Altan Sume — central khurul of Kalmykia
