= Saikhan-Ovoo, Dundgovi =

District in Dundgovi Province, Mongolia

Coordinates: 45°27′33″N 103°54′02″E

Saikhan-Ovoo District Сайхан-Овоо сум ᠰᠠᠶᠢᠬᠠᠨᠣᠪᠤᠭ᠎ᠠᠰᠤᠮᠤ
- District
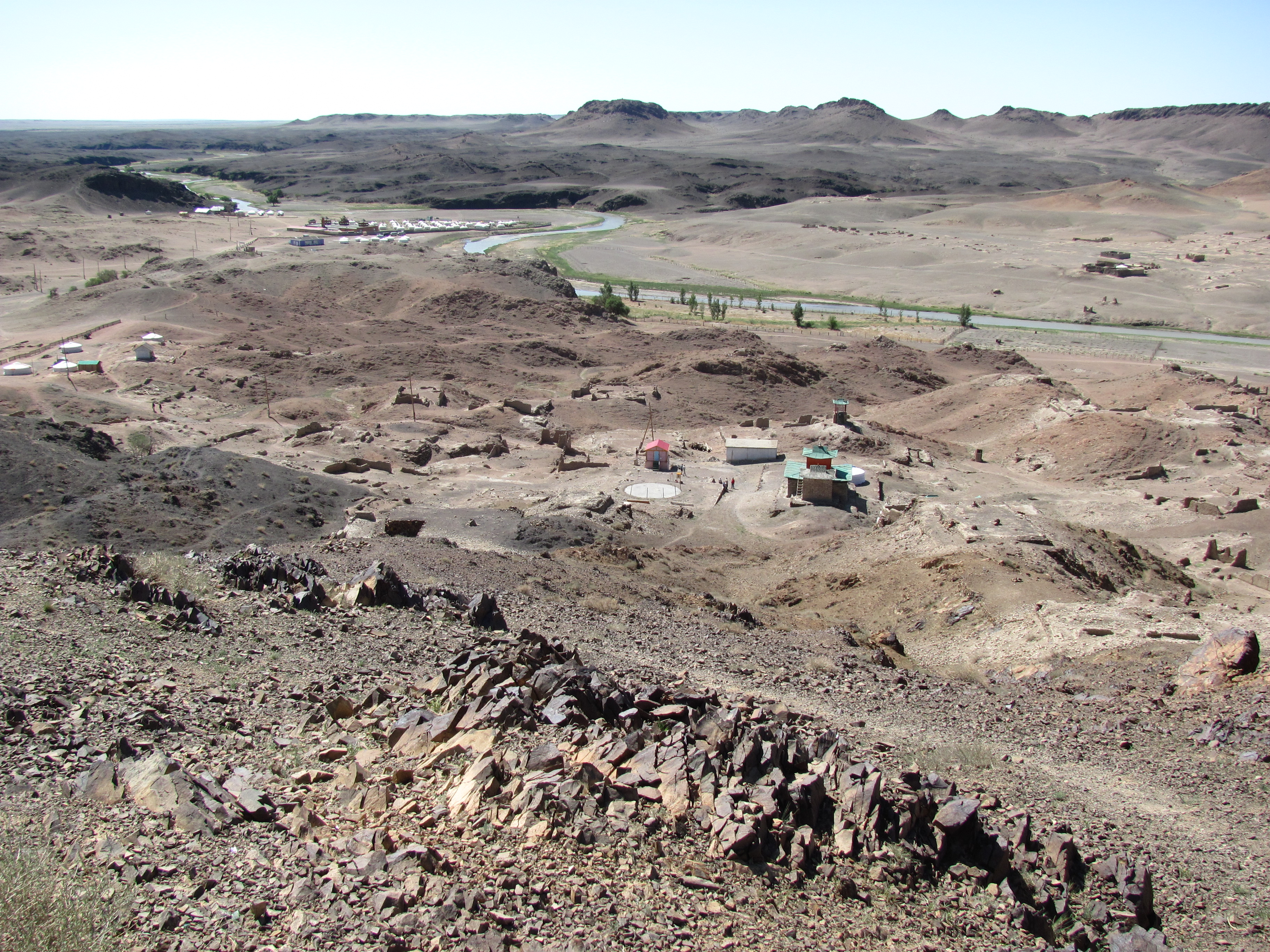
- Ongiin Khiid Monastery and Ongi river

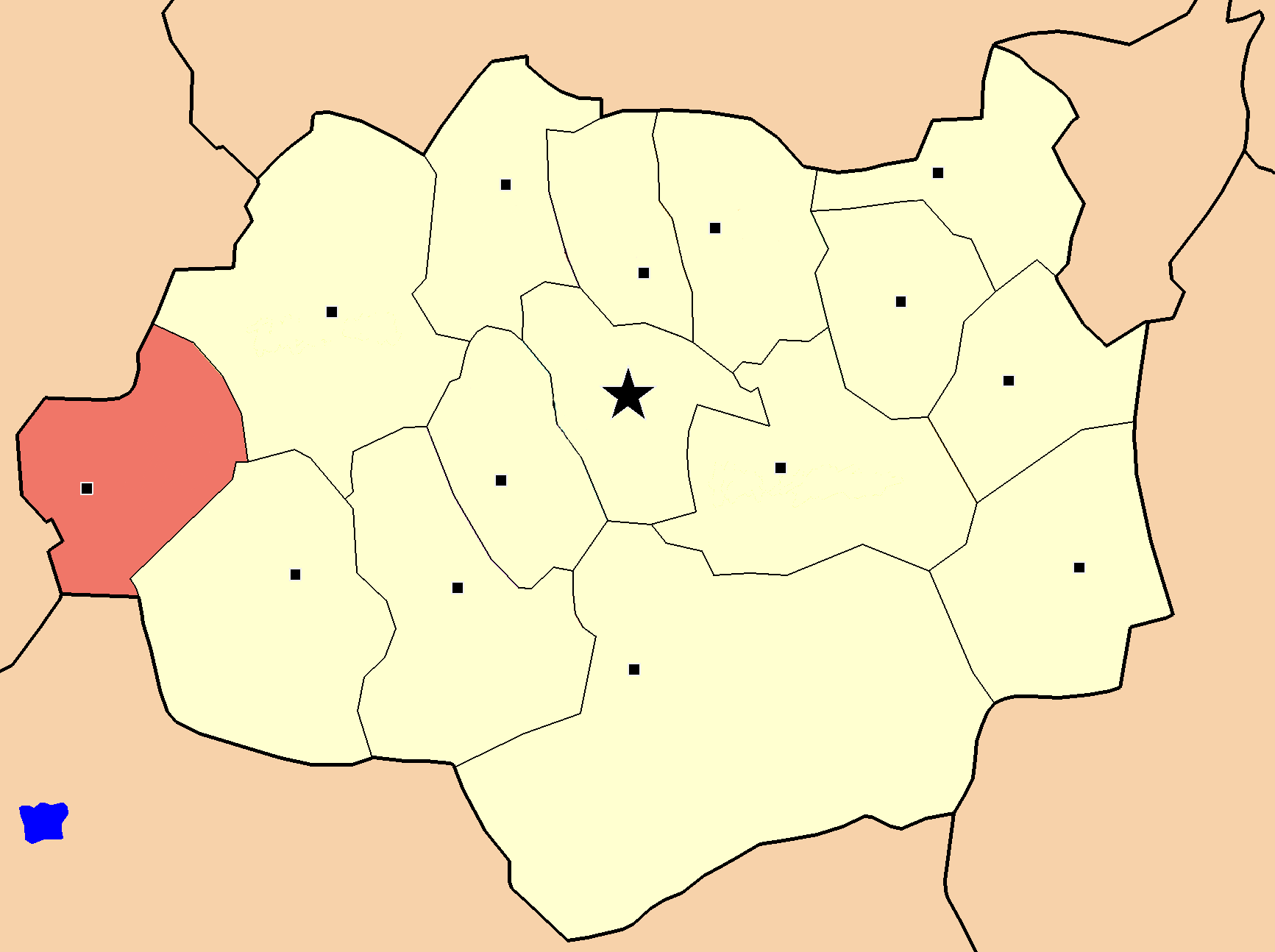
- Saikhan-Ovoo District in Dundgovi Province
- Country: Mongolia
- Province: Dundgovi Province

Area
  - Total: 4,055 km^{2} (1,566 sq mi)
- Time zone: UTC+8 (UTC + 8)

Saikhan-Ovoo (Mongolian: Сайхан-Овоо, Beautiful ovoo) is a sum (district) in central Mongolia. The sum center is on the single perennial river of Dundgovi Province, the Ongi gol. It is the tenth longest river in Mongolia with an overall length of 435 km.

== Administrative divisions ==
The district is divided into four bags, which are:

- Maanit
- Naiz
- Ongi
- Tugrug

== Onglin Khid ==
Ongiin Khiid is a notable monastery on the Ongi river about 18 km from Saikhan Ovoo. Formerly one of the largest monasteries in Mongolia, it was founded in 1660 and consisted of two temples complexes on the North and South of the Ongi Gol river. The older southern complex consisted of various administrative buildings as well as 11 temples. The northern complex, built in the 18th century, consisted of 17 temples - among them one of the largest temples in all of Mongolia. The grounds housed also 4 Buddhist universities. It was completely destroyed in 1939 under Khorloogiin Choibalsan, the then president and leader of the Communist Party of Mongolia. Over 200 monks were killed, and many surviving monks were imprisoned or forced to join the Communist controlled army. A large number of ruins including a tall stupa can be seen on the river and on the surrounding hills. In the 1990s, it was decided to rebuild the monastery. The first temple was inaugurated in 2004. There is a small museum in a ger in front of it. One of the stupas has just been reconstructed as well. It has a commemorative plaque indicating the names of the monks who were killed in 1939. At present (2011), 13 monks live in the monastery.
