= Arshan =

Arshan (Russian: Аршан) is the name of several rural localities in Russia:

- Arshan, Republic of Buryatia, a settlement in Arshansky Selsoviet of Tunkinsky District in the Republic of Buryatia
- Arshan, Kuytunsky District, Irkutsk Oblast, a village in Kuytunsky District of Irkutsk Oblast
- Arshan, Tulunsky District, Irkutsk Oblast, a settlement in Tulunsky District of Irkutsk Oblast
- Arshan, Alarsky District, Irkutsk Oblast, a village in Alarsky District of Irkutsk Oblast
- Arshan, Republic of Kalmykia, a settlement under the administrative jurisdiction of the City of Elista in the Republic of Kalmykia; 46°17′N 44°13′E
