= Rechnoye =

Rechnoye Речное
- Selo
- Interactive map of Rechnoye
- Location within Astrakhan Oblast Location within Russia
- Coordinates: 46°55′N 47°37′E
- Country: Russia
- Region: Astrakhan Oblast
- District: Kharabalinsky District
- Time zone: UTC+4:00

Rechnoye (Russian: Речное) is a rural locality (a selo) and the administrative center of Rechnovsky Selsoviet, Kharabalinsky District, Astrakhan Oblast, Russia. The population was 900 as of 2010. There are 17 streets.

== Geography ==
Rechnoye is located 71 km southeast of Kharabali (the district's administrative centre) by road. Zavolzhskoye is the nearest rural locality.
