= Buddhism in Kalmykia =

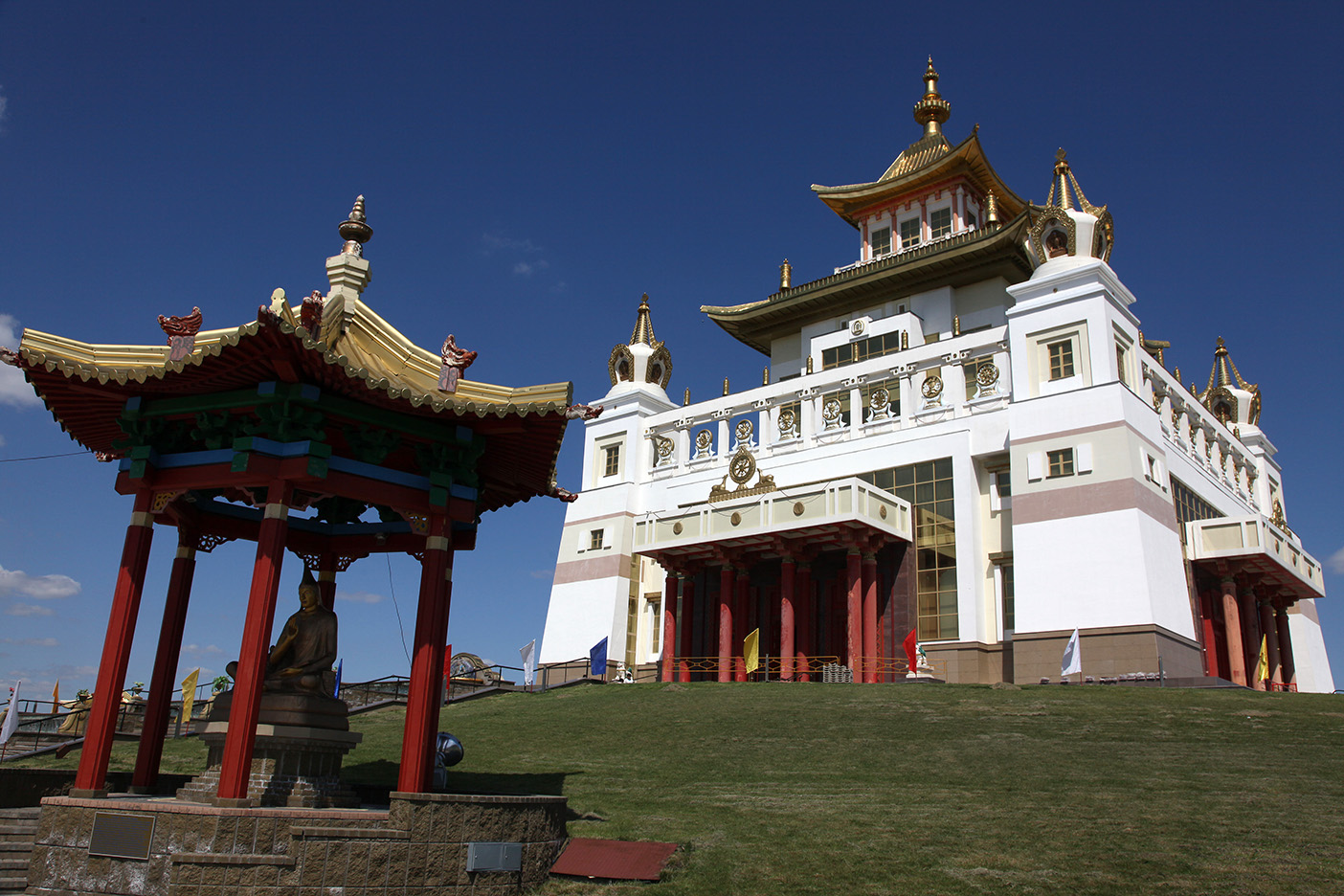
Golden Temple, Elista, Kalmykia

The Republic of Kalmykia is the sole Buddhist-majority nation within Europe

The Kalmyks are the only Mongolic ethnic group inhabiting Europe whose majority religion is Buddhism which its sole denomination is Vajrayana, namely Tibetan Buddhism. In 2016, 53.4% of the population surveyed identified themselves as Tibetan Buddhists. They are natives to Kalmykia, a federal subject of Russia in the southwest. Kalmykia borders Dagestan to the south, Stavropol Krai to the southwest, Rostov Oblast to the west, Volgograd Oblast to the northwest, and Astrakhan Oblast to the east. The Caspian Sea borders Kalmykia to the southeast.

The Kalmyks are the descendants of Oirat Mongols who migrated from Western Mongolia to Europe during the early part of the 17th century. As Tibetan Buddhists, the Kalmyks regard the Dalai Lama as their spiritual leader. The Šajin Lama (Supreme Lama) of the Kalmyks is Erdne Ombadykow, a Philadelphia-born man of Kalmyk descent who was brought up as a Tibetan Buddhist monk at a Tibetan monastery in India from the age of seven and who was identified as the reincarnation (tulku) of the Buddhist saint Telo Rinpoche by the 14th Dalai Lama.

== History of Buddhism in Kalmykia ==
=== Background ===
The Oirats are the historical ancestors of the Kalmyks. They consisted of several West Mongol tribes who were living in South Siberia. In the 13th century, they inhabited areas around the upper Irtysh river and the west side of Altai Mountains. This territory was called Dzungaria. It became part of the empire of Genghis Khan in the same century. At the beginning of the 17th century, there was a mass exodus of Oirats to the Russian Empire because of a shortage of pastureland and the unstable political situation among Mongol tribes and a constant strife with the neighboring Kazakh Khanate. The Oirats became a subject of the Russian Empire in 1609. They were permitted to nomadize within the allotted area along the Irtysh and Tobol rivers and were guaranteed military support against Mongols and Kazakhs. In exchange for this permission, they were obligated to participate in military campaigns and to protect the southern borders of the Russian Empire. Around the middle of the 17th century, the northern Caspian steppes on both sides of the Volga river were allotted to the Oirats. This territory received the status of Kalmyk Khanate in 1664. The khanate was an independent polity ruled by a Khan. Around this time, Oirats began to be called "Kalmyks". The Russian Empire did not interfere in the internal affairs of the Kalmyk Khanate until the middle of the 18th century, when it started to colonize the Volga steppes with Russian peasants, causing an economic crisis and the migration of approximately 70% of the khanate's population to Dzungaria. Soon after, in 1771, Catherine the Great ended the independence of the Kalmyk Khanate.

=== In the Russian Empire ===
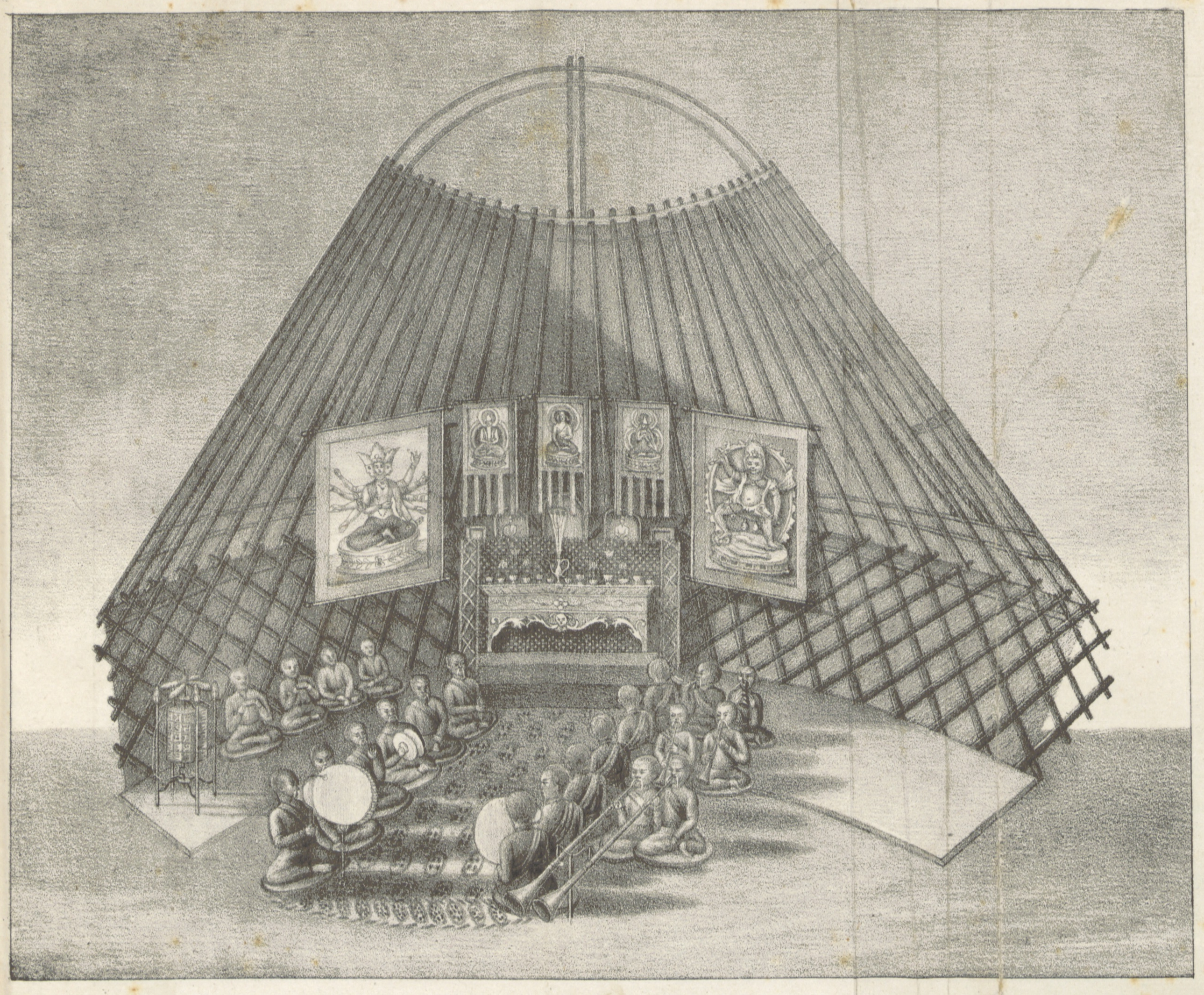
Kalmyk people in a Buddhist ceremony (1830s)

Buddhism spread among Mongols during the time of the Mongol Empire; though, there is a theory that Oirats, in contrast to the other Mongol groups, came in contact with it even earlier – as early as the 9th century through neighboring Turkic peoples. Oirats brought Buddhism as their main religion to Russia, becoming the first Buddhist community in Europe. They kept close ties with Buddhist centers in Tibet and Mongolia until the end of the 18th century. The Tibetan Dalai Lama even appointed the Kalmyk khans. But with Catherine the Great, the relationship between the Kalmyks and the Russian administration experienced an unfavorable shift. The Russian Empire abolished the Kalmyk Khanate and implemented anti-Buddhist reforms. The government prohibited the contact with Tibet and decided to limit the number of monks per Buddhist monastery. The Kalmyk clergy took countermeasure to maintain their numbers by renaming temples (Kalmyk: сүм, romanized: süm) and monasteries (Kalmyk: кийд, romanized: kiid) to khuruls, which means "assembly".

The anti-Buddhist reforms remained in force until 1905, when a summit conference either relaxed or abolished the regulations and allowed contact to resume with Tibet and Mongolia. Furthermore, monasteries were allowed to open printing houses and schools, and monks were permitted to travel abroad and bring back Buddhist literature and ritual objects.

=== In the Soviet Union ===
By 1917, there were 92 khuruls (28 large monasteries and 64 smaller ones) with 2,090 monks in Kalmykia. In the same year, the Kalmyk clergy decided to further increase the number of khuruls to 119 and that of monks to 2,730. However, after the Bolshevik revolution, Kalmykia became part of the USSR which pursued an ideology of "non-religiousness" from the 1930s to the late 1980s. Buddhism became severely persecuted by the Soviet government. By 1937, 79 of the more than 100 khuruls registered in the 1920s in Kalmykia had been abolished, and by the beginning of World War Two there were no more khuruls left at all. Monastic property was confiscated or destroyed and monks were arrested and forced to renounce their vows. Finally, in 1943, the entire population of Kalmykia was deported to Siberia based on accusations of treason. The Kalmyk republic officially ceased to exist based on a decree of the Supreme Soviet on 27 December 1943. The Kalmyk people were not allowed to return to the Volga steppes until 1957. In 1958, the republic of Kalmykia was officially restored, but not allowed to revive Buddhism. Buryatia was the only republic that was permitted to practice Buddhism in Soviet times.

The end of the 1980s marked the beginning of the cultural, ethnic and religious revitalization for the Kalmyk people. Since then, Buddhism has become the focus of ethnic identity for most Kalmyks, according to Gazizova, even for those who do not consider themselves Buddhists.

=== In the Russian Federation ===
==== Revival of Buddhism ====
Officially, religious revival was not allowed until the federal law on "the Freedom of Consciousness and Religious Organizations" came in force in October 1990, but the first Kalmyk Buddhist community was already registered two years earlier, in October 1988, after an officially permitted lecture by the American scholar and translator of Tibetan Buddhist texts, Alexander Berzin. The first khurul opened in 1989 in Elista – it was a small house that was repurposed to become the so-called "Elista Khurul". The Lama Kushok Bakula Rinpoche consecrated the new khurul the same year. The Lama was the first high-rank monk to visit Kalmykia after the fall of the Soviet Union. At this occasion, he also initiated the first novices. In 1991, the centralized religious organization "Kalmyk Buddhist Union" (Russian: Объединение буддистов Калмыкии, romanized: Obyedinenie buddistov Kalmykii) was formed and announced its autonomy from the Central Religious Board of Buddhists of the USSR.

==== Election of a Šajin Lama and the principles of monasticism ====
The Kalmyk Buddhist revival was complicated by the fact that there had not been any Buddhist educational establishments in Kalmykia since the 1930s, and thus, no qualified clergy. Only three old monks who had received proper Buddhist education in the past were still alive. For this reason, monks from the Ivolginsky Datsan in Buryatia were invited to assist. Thus, the first person to become the head lama of Kalmyk Buddhists (Šajin Lama in Kalmyk) was the Buryat Tuvan Dorzh (Russian: Туван Дорж) – to the discontent of the Kalmyks. Wanting their own Kalmyk sangha, seven young Kalmyks who had taken the lay vows of genin went on a one week-long hunger strike in the summer of 1992 to push for the election of a new Šajin Lama. The strike received a lot of media attention and led to an emergency conference of the Kalmyk Buddhist Union with 180 people partaking. As a result, Sandzhi Ulanov was appointed to replace Tuvan Dorzh as the Šajin Lama. Sandzhi Ulanov (born 1903), who was better known as Sandzhi Gelüng, was the only Kalmyk gelüng (the term for a fully ordained monk) still alive and residing in Elista at the time. However, he declined to take on the role of Šajin Lama because of its demanding nature and due to his old age. Eventually, it was decided to invite Telo Tulku Rinpoche to be the Kalmyk Buddhist leader who was a second-generation Kalmyk immigrant to the United States of America. With Telo Tulku being a recognized reincarnation of an important religious person, the institution of the tulku was re-introduced to Kalmykia. It had disappeared in the 17th century, and it became a distinctive feature of the post-Soviet Buddhist revival. In 1991, Telo Tulku visited Kalmykia for the first, accompanying the Dalai Lama. After his election as the Šajin Lama, he started to implement the principles of monasticism in Elista Khurul. The khurul received the official status of a monastery and soon became the Kalmyk Central Buddhist Monastery. To Telo Tulku, the revival of Buddhism meant reviving the community of celibate monks which lead to the exclusion of married clergy from the monastery. Those excluded monks later went on to form their own Buddhist communities. Telo Tulku returned to the United States in 1993. In the following two years of his absence, he was substituted by the teacher of Tibetan Buddhism and representative of the 14th Dalai Lama, Jampa Tinley. Before returning to Kalmykia in 1995, Telo Tulku renounced his monk's vows due to a marriage, but he remained the Šajin Lama and head of the Kalmyk Buddhist Union and did not change his views regarding monasticism, including celibacy, despite no longer being a celibate monk himself.

==== Dharma Center of Kalmykia and lay Buddhist communities ====
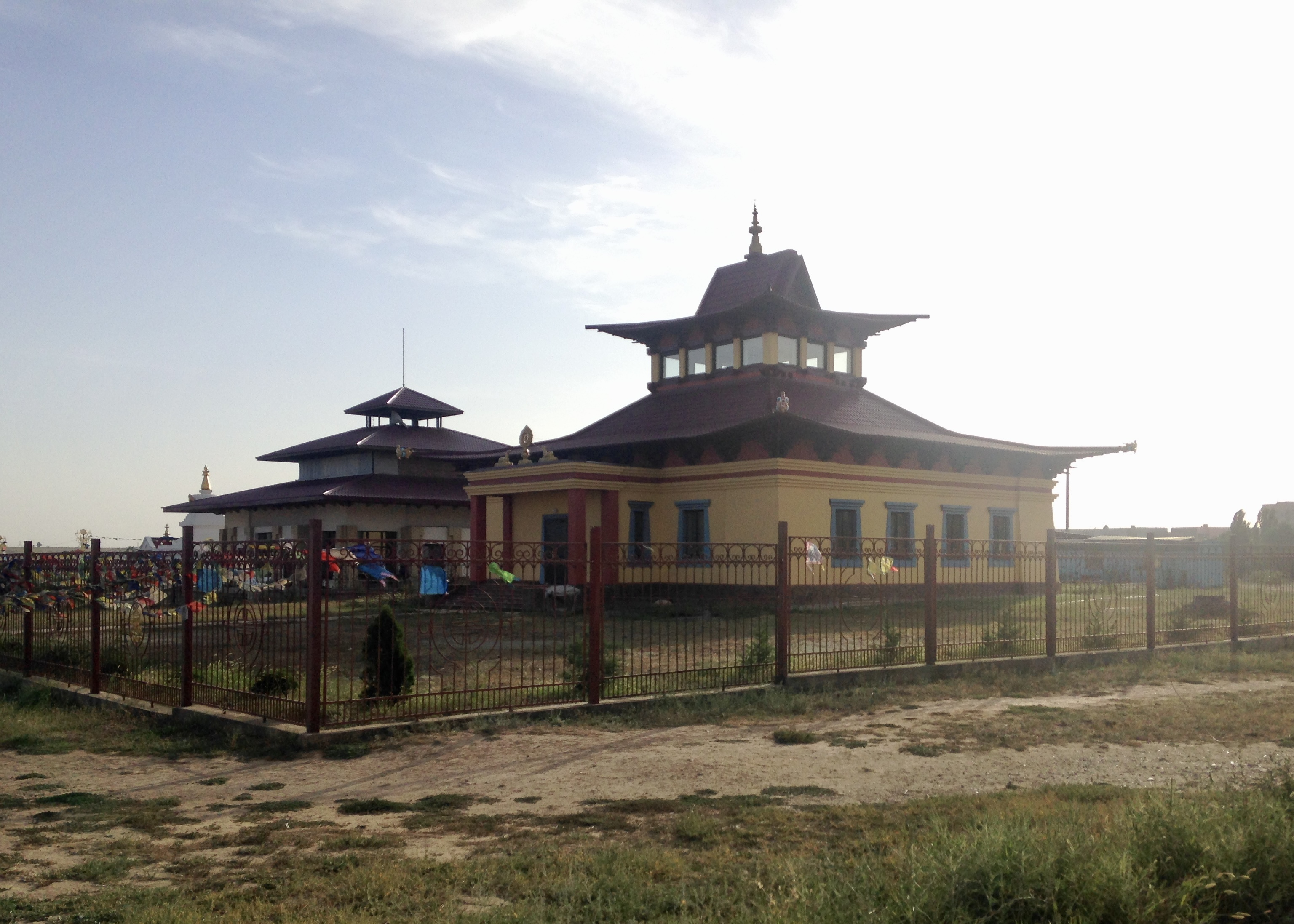
The Dharma Center "Samye Tinle Kunkyab Pelbar Ling" (Russian: Самье Тинле Кункъяб Пэлбар Линг) in Elista

Another important contributor to the revival of Buddhism in Kalmykia has been the Dharma Center of Kalmykia. It was established in 1991 in Elista with the goal "to develop non-monastic Buddhism and to educate the laity in the basic philosophy, history, and practice of Buddhism". In the 1990s, the center offered courses on the Tibetan language and Buddhist logic, and invited teachers of different Tibetan traditions. As a result of their efforts, several lay Buddhist communities had been developed by the end of the century.

==== Role of the government of Kalmykia ====
Unlike the Russian federal government, the government of Kalmykia has taken on an active role in the religious revival of the republic. Kalmykia's first head of state since the fall of the USSR, Kirsan Ilyumzhinov, who ruled the republic from 1993 to 2010, declared religion to be an essential part of the state policy of Kalmykia, even though the constitution of the Russian Federation separates religious institutions from the state. Ilyumzhinov established a special department for religious affairs to assist the religious revival. The department collected large subsidies and donated them for the building of khuruls and churches. Within a span of just a year since Ilyumzhinov's election, eleven khuruls were opened with regional funds. The head of state also sponsored constructions of temples and Christian churches from his private funds. Sponsoring the third visit of the Dalai Lama to Kalmykia in 2004 was even part of Ilyumzhinov's election campaign. As of 2017, this was the last time that the Dalai Lama had visited the republic.

==== "Pure" Buddhism and contemporary challenges ====
Telo Tulku and Andja Gelüng, the abbot of the Central Kalmyk Monastery, insist that monasticism is a mandatory part of Vinaya, because only monks with full vows can function as "true" teachers of Buddhism. Telo Tulku calls this type of Buddhism "pure Buddhism". To become a true teacher in the context of pure Buddhism, it is necessary to follow strict monastic discipline and the Buddhist vow, including celibacy, and to study Buddhist teachings intensively for many years. This is in accordance with the Gelugpa order.

'Pure Buddhism' is the traditional approach to the sangha, without any innovations, and without adding new elements under the influence of external factors. Yes, life is changing, but the Vinaya remains the same. Therefore, when monks take vows, they must follow these vows no matter what is happening around them.

— Andzha Gelüng (October 2012)

In this regard, Kalmykia's official approach to reviving Buddhism differs from the contemporary developments in Buryatia and Mongolia, where a relative laicization of sangha can be observed and where the strict distinction between monks and laity is gradually disappearing. Monks in the latter two places are neither obligated to live in a monastery nor need to adhere to celibacy.

== Kalmyk Buddhist diaspora ==
Kalmyk political refugees opened the first Buddhist temple in Central Europe, the Belgrade pagoda, located in Belgrade, Serbia, in 1929. In the wake of the Second World War, an estimated 526 Kalmyk refugees migrated from West Germany and surrounding areas to America in the late 1951 and early 1952. By 1962, the approximate Kalmyk population in the United States was 700. There, they established several Kalmyk Buddhist temples in Monmouth County, New Jersey and its environs. Ngawang Wangyal, a Kalmyk Buddhist monk, established the Tibetan Buddhist Learning Center and monastery in Washington, New Jersey.

== The babushki matsik ==
The babushki matsik (matsg), meaning "group of old women precept holders" were groups of elderly women who maintained traditional Tibetan Buddhist practices during the forced deportation of Kalmyk nationals to Siberia in 1943. This followed a period in the 1930s of the arrests and persecution of the Buddhist clergy under the Stalinist regime. During this period, all Kalmyk Buddhist shrines and temples were demolished. The babushki matsik are increasingly recognised for their role in preserving translated Tibetan Buddhist sacred texts, advantageously using their "politically negligible" status as old women to create untouchable religious material that could then be recorded and dispersed in periods of religious freedom.

== See also ==
- Buddhism in Buryatia
- Buddhism in Russia
- Khurul
- Burkhan Bakshin Altan Sume
- Geden Sheddup Choikorling Monastery
- Clear Script
- Rinpoche – honorific title in the Tibetan language
