= Burkhan Bakshin Altan Sume =

Buddhist monastery in Elista, Russia

Burkhan Bakşïn Altın Sümi
- Бурхн Багшин алтн сүм
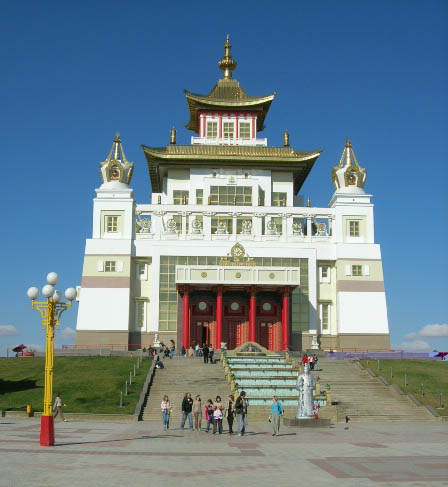
- Golden Monastery in Elista
- Interactive map of Burkhan Bakşïn Altın Sümi

Monastery information
- Other names: Russian: Калмыцкий Центральный Буддийский монастырь, romanized: Kalmytsky Tsentralny Buddiysky Monastyr
- Order: Gelug
- Denomination: Tibetan Buddhism
- Established: December 27, 2005

People
- Founder: 14th Dalai Lama
- Abbot: Mutl Vladimirovich Ovyanov (Мутл Владимирович Овьянов)

Architecture
- Status: Central Khurul of Kalmykia
- Architect: S.E. Kurneyev (С.Е. Курнеев), V.B. Gilyandikov (В.Б. Гиляндиков), L.D. Amninov (Л.Д. Амнинов)
- Style: Tibetan Buddhist architecture
- Groundbreaking: December 2, 2004
- Completed date: December 27, 2005

Site
- Location: Elista, Republic of Kalmykia
- Country: Russia
- Coordinates: 46°18′35″N 44°17′2″E
- Public access: Yes
- Website: khurul.ru

The Burkhan Bakshin Altan Sume ("The Golden Abode of the Buddha Sakyamuni", Kalmyk: Бурхн Багшин алтн сүм, romanized: Burxn Bagşin altn süm, [burˈxən baxˈʃin aɫˈtən syˈmə]; Russian: Золотая обитель Будды Шакьямуни, romanized: Zolotaya obitel Buddy Shakyamuni) is a Gelug Buddhist monastery in Elista, the capital of the Republic of Kalmykia, a federal subject of the Russian Federation. The temple is the largest Buddhist temple in Russia and Europe, and it contains the third largest Buddha statue in Europe — 9 m (30 ft), with only the 10 m (33 ft) tall Miró Buddha in Paris and the 12.5 m (41 ft) tall Buddha in Lagan being bigger.

It was opened on December 27, 2005, at the site of a former factory. More than 5,000 people attended the opening ceremony, including representatives of Tibetan Buddhist communities from Moscow, Volgograd and Saratov.

The 14th Dalai Lama blessed the site of the future temple just before he left Elista during his November 2004 visit to the Republic and gave it its name on March 11, 2006.

During the opening ceremony, the president of the Republic of Kalmykia Kirsan Ilyumzhinov dedicated the monastery to Kalmyks who died during and after their sudden and forced exile to Siberia. The date corresponded with Zul-Khural, the Kalmyk New Year (similar to Galdan Namchot), and the anniversary of the 1943 deportations (December 27, 1943).

== Exterior of the monastery complex ==
Along the perimeter, the monastery (Kalmyk: хурул, romanized: khurul) is surrounded by a fence with white suburgans alternating every five meters. In total, there are 108 suburgans around the khurul, representing 108 Buddhas. There are four entrances in the fence of the temple, located on the four cardinal points, symbolizing the four elements earth, fire, water, and wind. The southern gate is the main gate. A wish-fulfilling jewel, that grants wealth, can be found on both sides of the gate. The khurul is surrounded by 17 pagodas with statues of the great Buddhist teachers of the Nalanda monastery. Those pagodas were added on the recommendation of the 14th Dalai Lama. In addition, there are four large pagodas with prayer wheels (Kalmyk: кюрдэ, romanized: kyurde) at the four corners of the complex. On the main square of the monastery complex, along the axis of the southern entrance, there is a statue of the White Elder Tsagan Aav (Kalmyk: Цаһан өвгн).

The eight auspicious symbols of Buddhism decorate the facade of the monastery. The pediment of the facade is decorated with a sculpture of Dharmachakra — the Wheel of Teaching. On the sides, there are two fallow deer, the listeners of the first sermon of Buddha.

The entire architectural plan of the monastery has the shape of a mandala.

Overview of the monastery complex with stupas, pagodas, and the monastery in the center	The southern gate as seen from the courtyyard	Prayer wheels - Kyurde	Statue of Tsagan Aav on the main square in front of the Khurul

== Interior ==
The khurul consists of seven levels and has a total height of 63 m (207 ft).
On the ground floor, there are a lobby with a shop for Buddhist accessories, a security post, a stand with announcements, the schedule of rituals and prayers, and Buddhist news, a Buddhist library, a museum of Buddhist history, and a conference hall, which are all open to the public. The library holds the 108 volumes of the Kangyur, the 213 volumes of the Tengyur and the works of modern Buddhist philosophers. There are books in various languages, such as Kalmyk, Mongolian, Russian and English, among others. The collection of the museum includes relict texts, Gelug clothing items, archived photos, Buddhist art from the 12th-13th centuries, and Buddhist masks.

The second level of the khurul houses a prayer hall (Dugan) with a 9 m (30 ft) statue of the Buddha Sakyamuni, sitting in an āsana position, by sculptor Vladimir Vaskin. Sacred objects are laid inside the statue — mantras, incense, valuables, handfuls of earth from all regions of the republic, and plants and cereals growing on the territory of Kalmykia. The statue itself is covered with gold leaf and encrusted with diamonds.

On the third level, there are an exhibition hall with a collection of photos, rooms for monks, the administration, and offices for individual reception, where monks, a Tibetan medicine doctor and astrologers receive believers (free of charge). During major Buddhist holidays, visitors can familiarize themselves with the exposition on the history of Buddhism and the national Kalmyk culture.

The fourth level consists of the office of the head of Buddhists of Kalmykia, Telo Tulku Rinpoche, and a guest room of the Head of the Republic of Kalmykia. There is also an open observation deck for walks of high teachers.

On the fifth level is the residence of His Holiness the 14th Dalai Lama, Tenzin Gyatso. It includes a reception hall, an office and the private quarters of the Teacher, and rooms for members of his secretariat and assistants.

Utility rooms are located on the sixth floor. On the seventh level, there is a meditation room for special ceremonies, which can only be visited by clergy.

== Environmental engagement ==
The Republic of Kalmykia, where the Burkhan Bakshin Altan Sume is located, is one of Russia's hottest places and is holding the countrywide heat record of 45.4 °C (113.7 °F) on July 12, 2010. Desertification is the main environmental problem of the republic and affects 80% of its territory. The Buddhist clergy of the khurul is involved in ecological projects to address the issue of land degradation. They promote ecological awareness and activities based on Buddhist religious theory and ideological values, and collaborate in ecological projects with other social and state organizations.

== See also ==
- Buddhism in Kalmykia
- Buddhism in Russia
- Geden Sheddup Choikorling Monastery — 2nd biggest Buddhist monastery of Kalmykia
