= Buddhism in Buryatia =

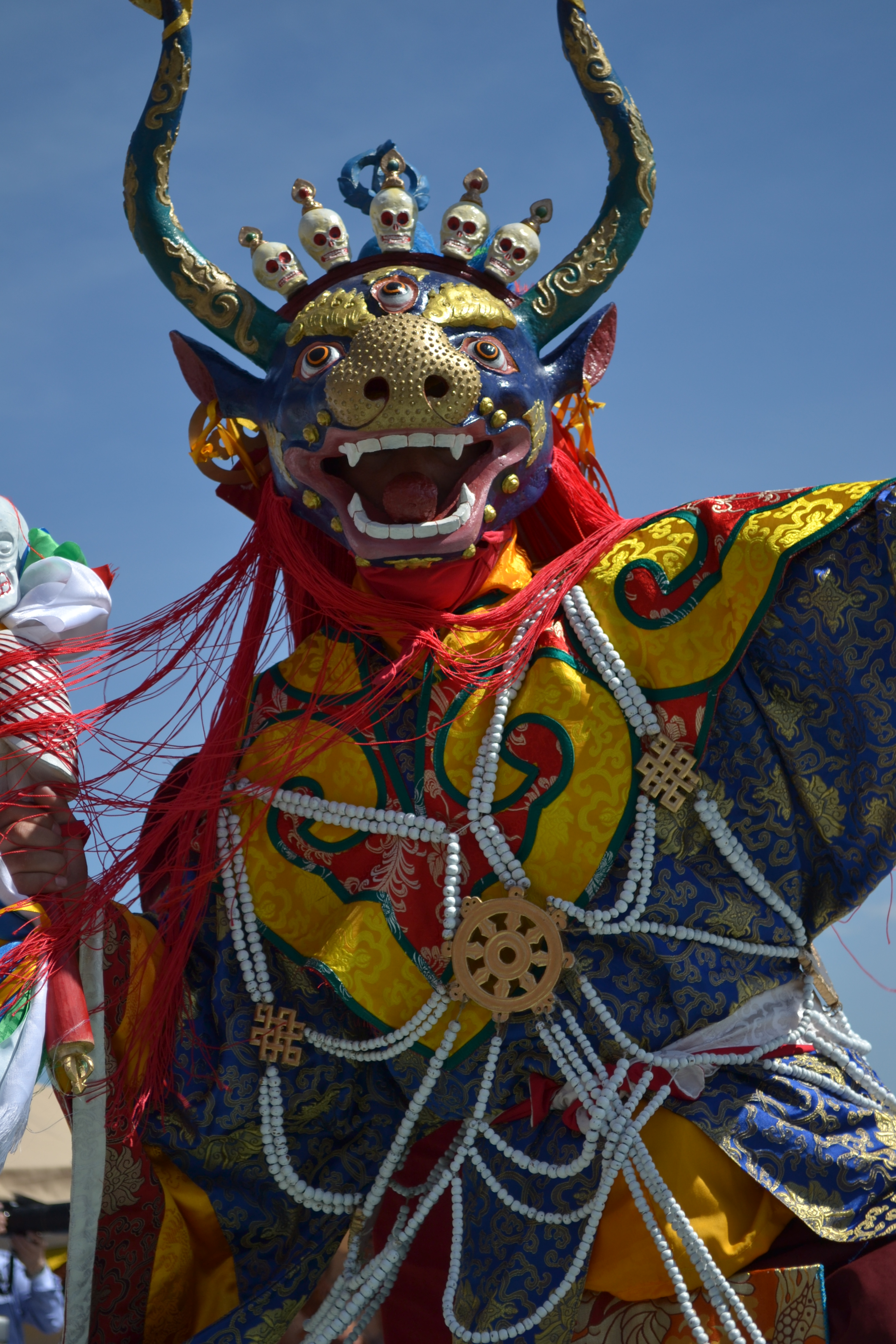
Cham mystery dance

Buddhism in Buryatia, a region in Siberia, Russia, has a deep-rooted history dating back to the 17th century when Mongolian Buddhism first arrived in the area. Initially adopted by ethnic groups like the Selenga and Zede Buryats, Mongolian Buddhism gradually spread throughout the Transbaikal region. In 1741, it gained formal recognition as an official religion in the Russian Empire, with the establishment of Buddhist monastic universities known as datsans. Despite facing significant challenges during the Soviet era, including persecution and the closure of religious institutions, Buddhism in Buryatia has persisted and experienced a revival in the post-Soviet period. The Evenks living in Buryatia are also Buddhists.

This unique form of Buddhism in Buryatia is primarily an extension of Vajrayana Buddhism, with a strong emphasis on the Gelug tradition from Tibet. While adherents revere Tsongkhapa alongside Shakyamuni Buddha, they have also incorporated elements of traditional, indigenous beliefs and practices, creating a syncretic form of Buddhism. Despite historical setbacks, Buryat Buddhism has left an indelible mark on the region's culture, influencing philosophy, art, literature, and even aspects of alternative medicine. Today, it continues to thrive and play a vital role in the spiritual and cultural life of Buryatia.

== History ==
Historical evidence gives reason to believe that, from the 2nd century BC, proto-Mongol peoples (the Xiongnu, Xianbei, and Khitans) were familiar with Buddhism. On the territory of the Ivolginsk Settlement, remains of Buddhist prayer beads were found in a Xiongnu grave.

At the beginning of the 17th century, Tibetan Buddhism penetrated northward from Mongolia to reach the Buryat population of Transbaikalia (the area just east of Lake Baikal). Initially, Buddhism disseminated primarily among the ethnic groups that had recently migrated out of Khalkha Mongolia (the Selenga and Zede Buryats). At the end of the 17th to the beginning of the 18th centuries, it spread throughout the Transbaikal region. A second branch came directly from Tibet, from the Labrang Monastery in Amdo.

=== Establishment ===
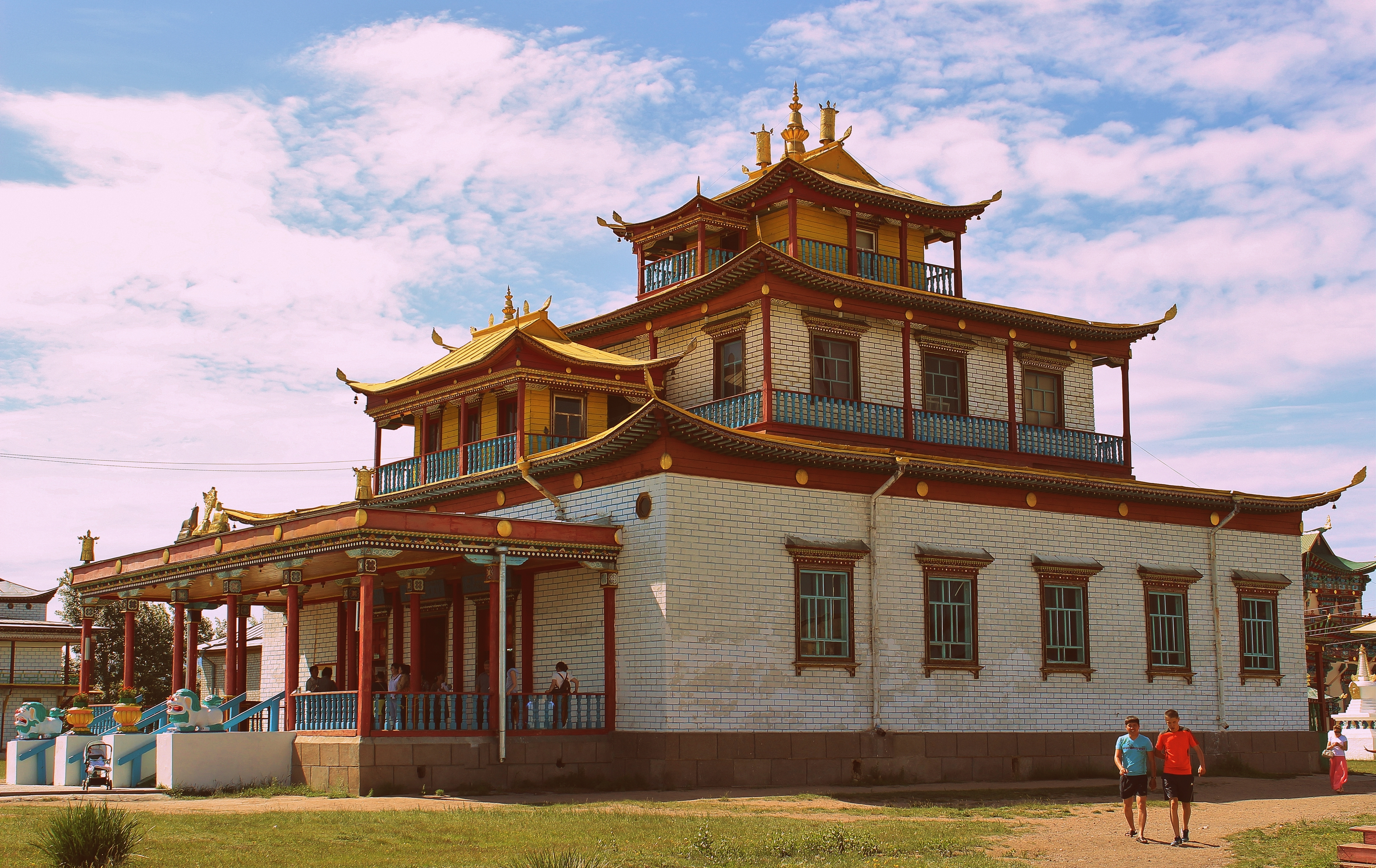
Dzogchen Dugan (temple) at the Ivolga Datsan, 2012

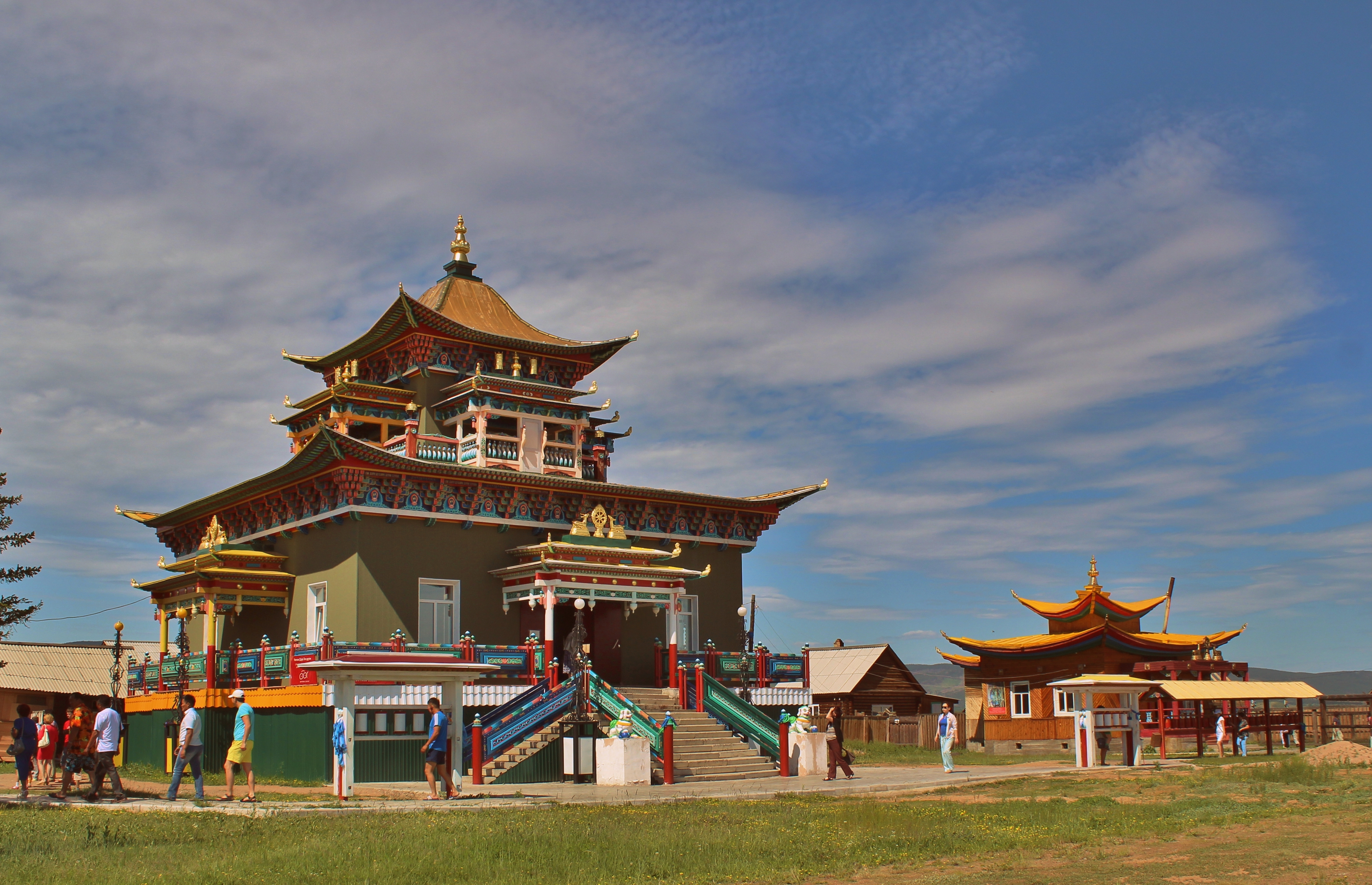
Green Tara Dugan at the Ivolga Datsan, 2012

In 1701 there were eleven dugans (small Buryat Buddhist temples) in Transbaikalia. In 1722 the border was delineated between Mongolia and Russia. Buryat tribes living nomadically in the northern part of Mongolia then became part of Russia. The Russian government closed off the border, induced the Buryat nomads to take on a relatively settled lifestyle, and made itself the authority on the region's religious matters.

Buddhist monastic universities, called datsans, were built in Buryatia – including the one at Tsongol, completed in the early 1740s. In 1741 Empress Elizabeth (Yelizaveta Petrovna) adopted a decree recognizing the existence of a "lamaist faith": She legally recognized the existence of eleven datsans, and with them 150 lamas. Buddhism was formally accepted as an official religion in the Russian Empire. (In July 1991 the Buddhists of Buryatia commemorated 250 years of official recognition of their religion).

For a long time in Buryat Buddhism there was a struggle for dominance between the Tsongol and Tamchinsky (Gusinoozyorsk) datsans. In 1764 the chief lama of the Tsongol Datsan became Supreme Lama of the Buryats of Transbaikalia, having received the title Pandit Hambo Lama ("learned prior"). Starting in 1809, supremacy passed to the priors of the Tamchinsky datsan. By 1846, thirty-four datsans had been established in Buryatia. Applying a great deal of effort and material resources, the Buryats managed to import from Tibet, China, and Mongolia a large quantity of esoteric literature and to adopt many living traditions from the Gelugpa lineage and other schools of Buddhism.

In 1869, the Mongolian lama Choi-Manramba began to lead instruction in Indo-Tibetan medicine at the Tsugol Datsan, and from there it spread. In 1878 the Duynhor Kalachakra School was founded at Aga Datsan, and this completed the establishment of the basic schools of spiritual higher education based on the Tibetan model.

Book printing developed quickly. In 1887, twenty-nine print shops were already in operation, which until their destruction in the 1930s published about 2000 book titles, written in Tibetan and Mongolian. At the end of the 19th century, Buddhism began a thorough penetration into Cisbaikalia (now Northern Buryatia), where it met fierce resistance from shamans and Christian missionaries.

In the late 19th and early 20th centuries, a great renewal movement began in Buryat Buddhism, and it gained additional impetus after the establishment of Soviet power in Buryatia.

=== 20th century ===
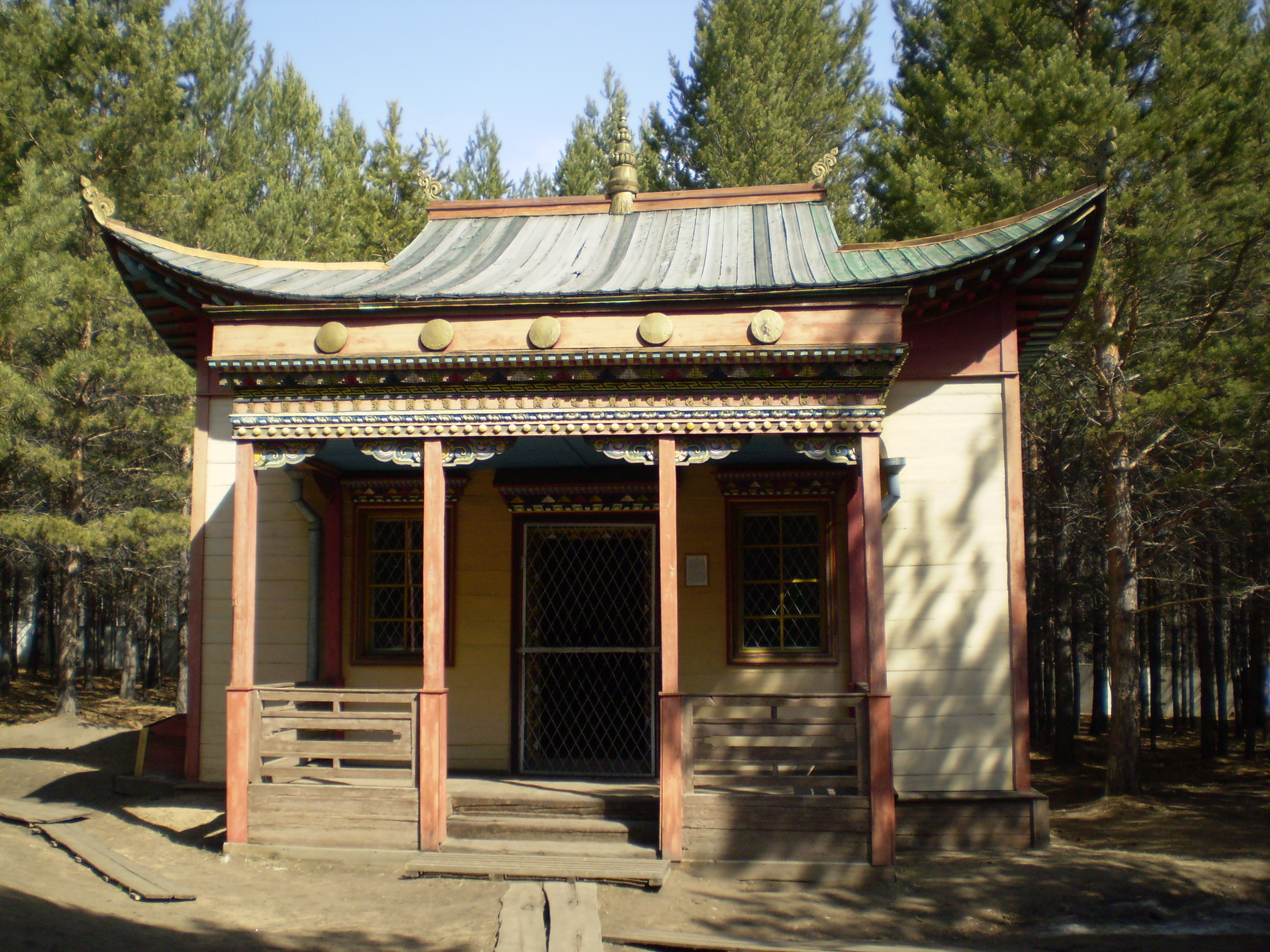
The Devajin Dugan at the Tamchinsky datsan. Exhibit at the Ethnographic Museum of the Peoples of Transbaikalia.

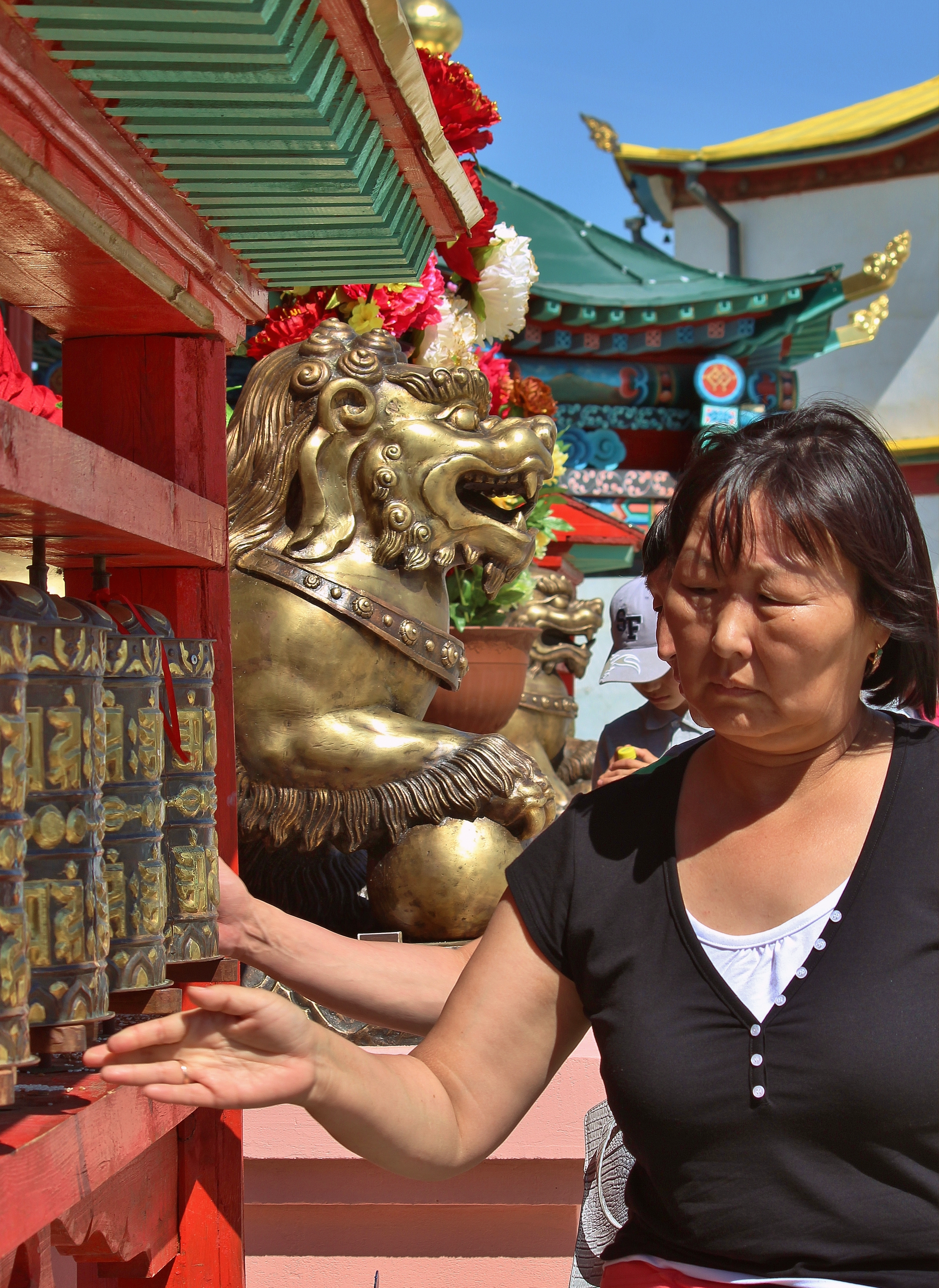
At Ivolga Datsan

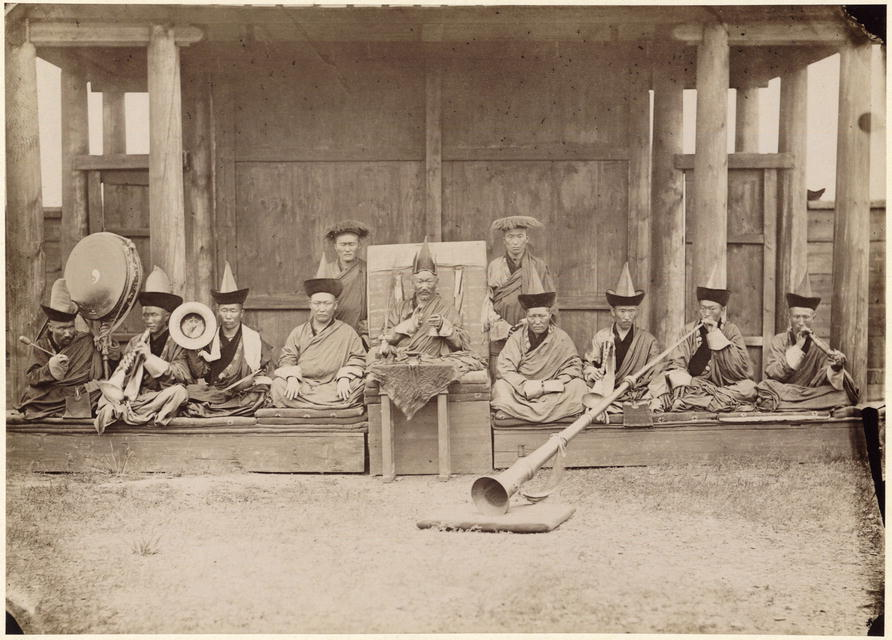
Hambo Lama (center) of the Tamchinsky datsan, 1886

In 1918 a law was adopted, the Decree on the Separation of Church from State and School from Church, which abolished religious education. In Buryatia this law came into effect in 1925. It destroyed the spiritual culture of the peoples of the new Soviet state, and for the Buryats specifically it meant the destruction of their Buddhist culture. Spiritual values created and accumulated over centuries were destroyed and erased in a short period of time. Of the forty-seven datsans and dugans operating at the beginning of the 20th century, almost nothing now remains. One thousand eight hundred and sixty-four highly learned lamas were sent to prison, into exile, or to hard labor; hundreds were shot to death. In the 1920s some Buryats resettled from Transbaikalia (mostly from Aga) to the Shenehen area of Inner Mongolia, and then continued their Buddhist traditions in addition to those which already existed in the region.

The Council of People's Commissars of the Buryat Autonomous Soviet Socialist Republic passed a resolution on 2 May 1945 to open a Buddhist temple, Hambyn Sume, in a place called Srednyaya Ivolga. Ivolga Datsan in Buryatia and Aga Datsan in the Aga Buryat national district of Chita Oblast, have been open and operational since 1946.

In 1991 a religious institution of higher education called Dashi Choynhorlin was opened at Ivolga Datsan for the training of priests, instructors, translators of canonical texts, artists, and iconographers. Training is carried out in accordance with the Goman Datsan monastic education system. In 1991 the number of operational datsans in Buryatia reached twelve.

== Local characteristics ==
Buddhism in Buryatia is the northernmost extension of Vajrayana Buddhism in Central Asia. It is primarily the Gelug tradition from Tibet, although there are signs of influence from the Nyingma tradition as well. Buddhist followers in Buryatia revere the founder of the Gelug school, the great guru Tsongkhapa (called Zonhobo in Buryat), on par with the founder of the entire Buddhist tradition, Shakyamuni Buddha. Gelug adherents in Buryatia prefer to either use this self-designation for the tradition, or the general terms "teachings of the Buddha" or "Mahayana doctrine."

Buryat Buddhism shows slight deviations from general Mahayana tradition mainly in its system of religious practice, in its rituals and magical practices, and are due to the influence of traditional, more ancient and archaic beliefs, practices, and rituals of the Tibetans and of the Buryat-Mongols. In particular, the religious system of Buddhism incorporated and assimilated traditional folk ceremonies, rituals, and beliefs associated with the honoring of ovoos, paying homage to spirits of the land, mountains, rivers, and trees. Among monastic religious practices, those of tantric origin, forming the basis of Vajrayana Buddhism, play an important role. In its philosophical, psychological and ethical teachings, Buryat Buddhism does not differ significantly from the fundamental provisions of Mahayana Buddhism as presented in the Tibetan version of the Buddhist canon referred to as the Kangyur (Ganzhuur in Buryat; 108 volumes) and the Tengyur (Danzhuur in Buryat; 225 volumes).

Buddhism has had a tremendous impact on the development of culture and scholarship among the Buryat-Mongols, particularly on the formation and development of philosophical thought, norms of morality, mental development, fictional literature, art, cooking, and aspects of alternative medicine including chronobiology and bioenergetics.

Among the great variety of religious practices at Buryat datsans, there are six large ceremonies that take place: Sagaalgan (New Year); Duynher (Kalachakra); Gandan-Shunserme (the birth, enlightenment and parinirvana of Shakyamuni Buddha); Maidari-Hural (the anticipated coming of Maitreya, the buddha of the next world epoch); Lhabab-Duysen (Buddha's descent from the heaven called Tushita); and Zul-Hural (commemoration of Tsongkhapa).

== Temples and monasteries ==
Datsans in Buryatia and in the Chita and Irkutsk Oblasts:

1. Hambyn-Hure Datsan of Ulan-Ude: city of Ulan-Ude
2. Aga Datsan: Chita, Aga Buryat Autonomous Area, village of Aginskoye
3. Atsagat Datsan: Republic of Buryatia, village of Naryn-Atsagat
4. Kurumkan Datsan: Republic of Buryatia, Kurumkansky (Huramhaanai in Buryat) District, village of Kurumkan
5. Sartul-Gegetuy Datsan: Republic of Buryatia, Jidinsky (Zede) District, village of Gegetuy
6. Atagan-Dyrestuy Datsan: Republic of Buryatia, Jidinsky (Zede) District, village of Dyrestuy
7. Tabangut-Ichotuy Datsan: Republic of Buryatia, Jidinsky (Zede) District, village of Dodo-Ichyotuy
8. Egita Datsan: Republic of Buryatia, Yeravninsky (Yaruunyn) District, village of Egita
9. Sanaga Datsan: Republic of Buryatia, Zakamensky (Zahaaminai) District, village of Sanaga
10. Tseezhe-Burgaltaysky Datsan: Republic of Buryatia, Zakamensky (Zahaaminai) District, village of Ust-Burgaltay
11. Ivolga Datsan: Republic of Buryatia, Ivolginsky (Ebilge) District, village of Verkhnyaya Ivolga website
12. Yangazhinsky Datsan: Republic of Buryatia, Ivolginsky (Ebilge) District, near Orongoy
13. Kizhinga Datsan: Republic of Buryatia, Kizhinginsky (Hezhengyn) District, village of Kizhinga
14. Baldan Breybun (Tsongolsky) Datsan: Republic of Buryatia, Kyakhtinsky (Hyaagtyn) District, village of Murochi
15. Tugnui Datsan: Republic of Buryatia, Mukhorshibirsky (Muhar-Sheber) District, village of Mukhorshibir
16. Okinsky Datsan: Republic of Buryatia, Okinsky (Ahyn) District, village of Orlik
17. Atsaysky Datsan: Republic of Buryatia, Selenginsky (Selenge) District, on the A340 highway between the village of Novoselenginsk and the city Gusinoozyorsk
18. Tamchinsky (Gusinoozyorsk) Datsan: Republic of Buryatia, Selenginsky (Selenge) District, village of Gusinoye Ozero (Tamcha)
19. Kyren Datsan: Republic of Buryatia, Tunkinsky (Tünhen) District, village of Kyren
20. Hoymor Datsan: Republic of Buryatia, Tunkinsky (Tünhen) District, Arshan resort
21. Ugdan Datsan: Transbaikalia District, Chita Oblast, village of Ugdan
22. Ust-Orda (Abaganat) Datsan: Irkutsk Oblast, village of Ust-Orda
23. Ana Datsan: Republic of Buryatia, Khorinsky (Hori) District, village of Ana
24. Chesan Datsan: Republic of Buryatia, Kizhinginsky (Hezhengyn) District, village of Chesan
25. Chita Datsan: Transbaikalia Kray, Chita Oblast, city of Chita
26. Tsugol Datsan: Chita Oblast, village of Tsugol

== See also ==
- Agvan Dorzhiev
- Buddhism in Kalmykia
- Buddhism in Russia
- Buddhism in Tuva
- Damba Ayusheev
- Datsan Gunzechoinei
- Shamanism in Siberia

== Bibliography ==
- Бардуева Т. Пандито Хамбо лама Даши-доржо Итигэлов и обновленческое движение в Бурятии // Вестник Бурятского государственного университета. – Улан-Удэ: Бурятский государственный университет, 2010. – No. 8. – С. 165–168. – ISSN 1994-0866. (Barduyeva, T.: "Pandito Hambo Lama Dashi-Dorzho Itigelov and the Renewal Movement in Buryatia", Bulletin of the Buryat State University, Ulan-Ude, 2010)
- Ванчикова Ц. П., Чимитдоржин Д. Г. История буддизма в Бурятии: 1945–2000 гг. Изд-во БНЦ СО РАН, 2006 (Vanchikova, Ts. P., Chimitdorzhin, D. G.: The History of Buddhism in Buryatia: 1945–2000, BNTs SO RAN Publishing, 2006)
- Жамсуев Б. Б., Ванчикова Ц. П. Земля Ваджрапани: Буддизм в Забайкалье. Изд-во Феория, 2008 (Zhamsuyev, B. B.; Vanchikova, Ts. P.: The Land of Vajrayana: Buddhism in Transbaikalia, Feoria Publishing, 2008)
- Жуковская Н. Л. Возрождение буддизма в Бурятии: проблемы и перспективы. Российская академия наук, Ин-т этнологии и антропологии, 1997 ISBN 9785201137113 (Zhokovskaya, N. L.: The Rebirth of Buddhism in Buryatia: Issues and Prospects, Russian Academy of Sciences, Institute of Ethnology and Anthropology, 1997)
- Манзанов Г. Е. Современное состояние религиозности в республике Бурятия // Религиоведение (журнал). – 2005. – No. 2. – С. 79–87. – ISSN 2072-8662. (Manzanov, G. Ye.: "The Contemporary State of Religion in the Republic of Buryatia," Religious Studies (magazine), 2005)
- Нестёркин С. П. Буддизм в Бурятии: истоки, история, современность: материалы конференции, 23–24 июня 2001 г., Тамчинский дацан. Бурятский научный центр СО РАН, 2002 (Nestyorkin, S. P.: "Buddhism in Buryatia: Sources, History, Modernity," conference materials from 23 to 24 June 2001 at Tamchinsky datsan, SO RAN Buryat Academic Center, 2002)
- Bernstein, Anya (2013). Religious Bodies Politic: Rituals of Sovereignty in Buryat Buddhism. University of Chicago Press. ISBN 978-0-226-07269-2.
- Zhukovskaia, Nataliia L. (2015). The Revival of Buddhism in Buryatia. In: Marjorie Mandelstam Balzer, Religion and Politics in Russia: A Reader. Routledge. pp. 197–215. ISBN 978-1-317-46112-8.
- Bernstein, Anna (2002). "Buddhist Revival in Buriatia: Recent Perspectives". Mongolian Studies. 25: 1–11. JSTOR 43193334. (registration required)
- Dugarova, Esuna (2025). "Faith in the Heartland of Baikal: The Enduring Buryat Buddhist Tradition." Tricycle The Buddhist Review.
