= Datsan =

Term used for Gelug Tibetan Buddhist university monasteries

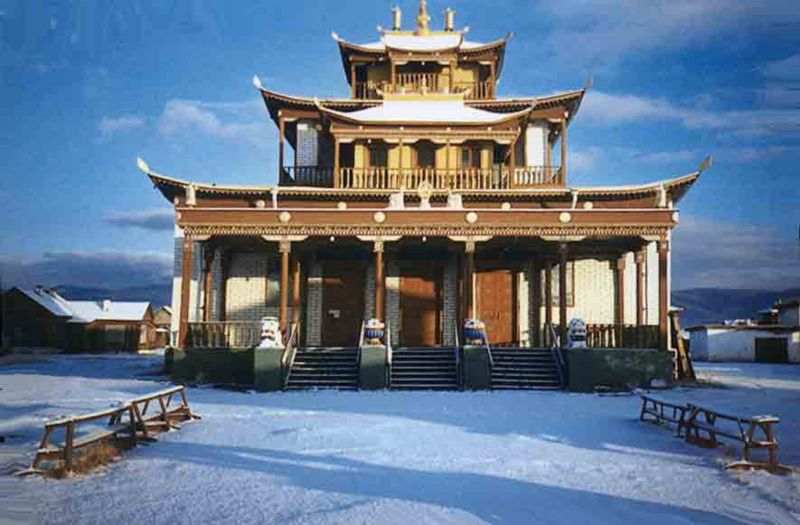
Ivolginsky datsan

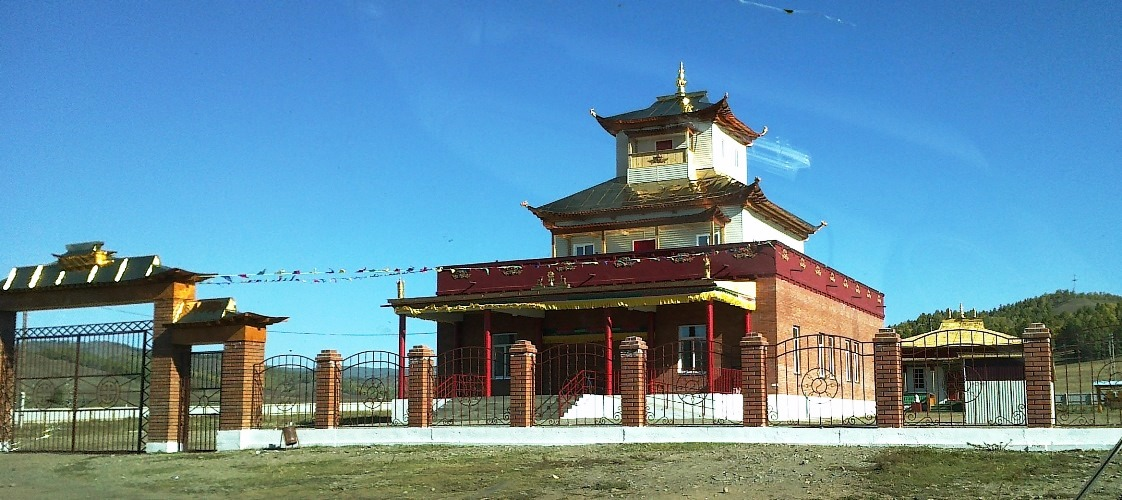
Tseezhe-Burgaltaysky datsan, Buryatia, Russia

Datsan (Mongolian: дацан, Russian: дацан, Buryat: дасан; derived from Standard Tibetan: གྲྭ་ཚང།, romanized: grwa.tshang) is the term used for Buddhist university monasteries in the Tibetan tradition of Gelukpa located throughout Mongolia, Tibet and Siberia. As a rule, in a datsan there are two departments—philosophical and medical. Sometimes a department of tantric practices is added to them where the monks study only after finishing education in the philosophical department.

In pre-revolutionary Russia, datsans traditionally existed only in the Buryat territories, most of those now included in Buryatia and Transbaikalia (a number of datsans there have been reconstructed or newly established since the early 1990s). There was a difference with Tibetan administrative idea: in Tibet, several datsans were education-centered parts of larger organizations, as Drepung, Ganden, and Sera Monastery in Gelukpa tradition. In Russia, datsans were not parts of a larger entity, but rather independent educational and religious centers. In Buryat Buddhism, the terms "Buddhist monastery" and "datsan" are interchangeable, as other monastery organization forms found in Tibetan Buddhism elsewhere, were not present.

== List of datsans in Mongolia ==
- Manba Datsan (also "Mamba Datsan")

== List of datsans in Russia ==
Datsans were officially acknowledged in Imperial Russia in 1741. By statute of 1853 there were two recognized datsans in the Irkutsk government and others in the Zabaykalsky government. The first datsan in Europe was Datsan Gunzechoinei in St. Petersburg.

Before the Communist Revolution in 1917, there were 40 datsans (not counting smaller temples — sume). After the revolution, the number went up to 48, but between 1927 and 1938 all datsans that existed in Buryatia and Transbaikalia were closed or destroyed. The Second World War, that followed shortly after, became another turning point for the Buddhists in Buryatia: despite the suppression by the communist government, the Buryat Buddhist community came together in 1944 and collected financial aids to support the communist state and the Red Army in their struggles against Nazi Germany. The communist government expressed their gratitude for the donations by giving them permission to open a Buddhist datsan in Buryatia. In 1946, the Ivolginsky datsan and the Aginsky datsan resumed operations. The following datsans were not opened until 1991.

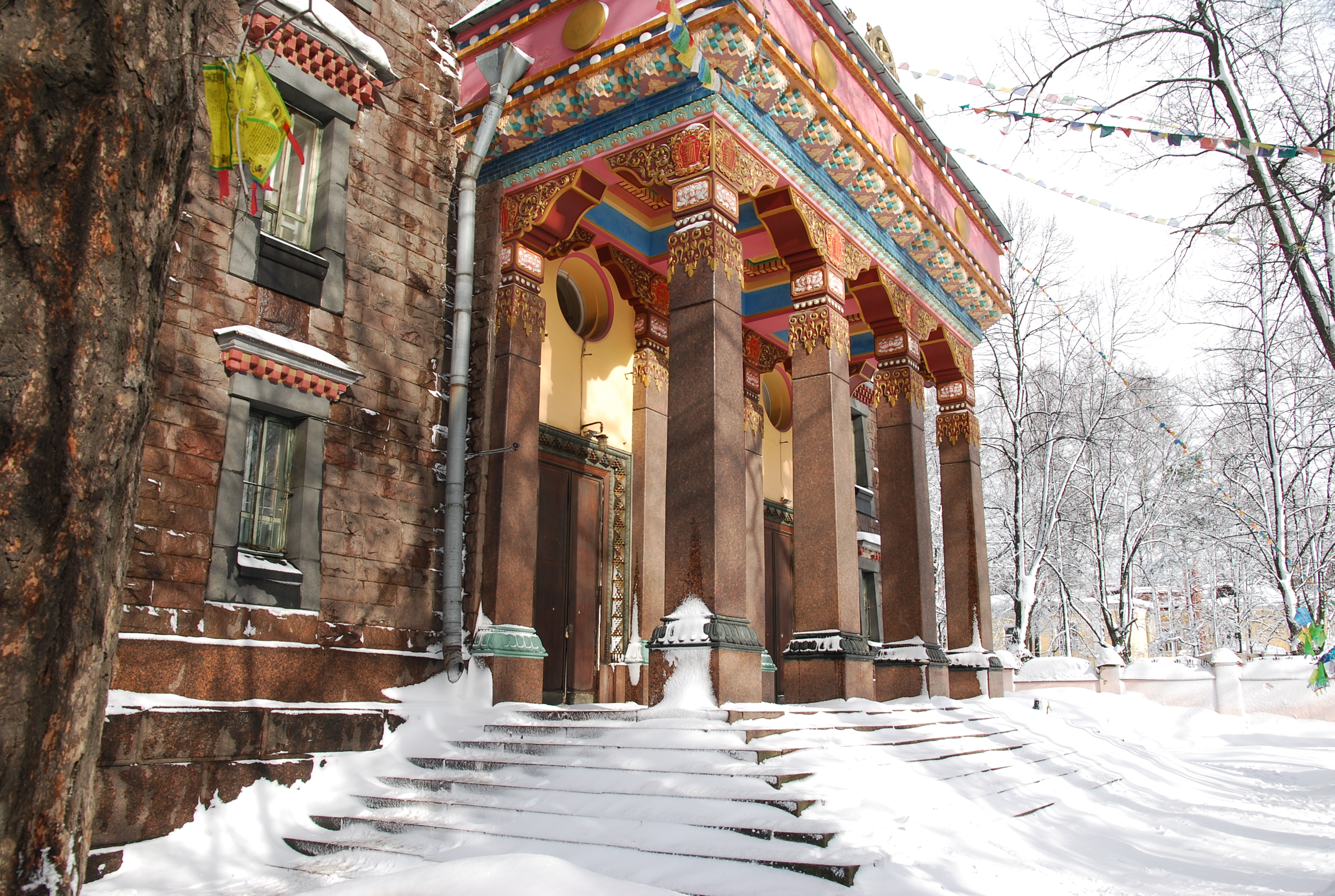
An early 20th-century Saint Petersburg Datsan

- Khambyn Khure datsan (Улан-Удэнский дацан Хамбын Хурэ) in Ulan-Ude
- Rinpoche Bagsha datsan (Ринпоче Багша дацан) in Ulan-Ude
- Rinchin Datsan
- Aginsky datsan (Агинский дацан) in Aginskoye
- Alarsky datsan (Аларский дацан «Даши Чойнхорлинг») in Kutulik
- Atagan-Dyrestuysky datsan (Атаган-Дырестуйский дацан «Лхундуб Дэчинлинг») in Dyrestuy
- Atsagatsky datsan (Ацагатский дацан) in Naryn-Atsagat
- Atsaysky datsan near Lake Gusinoye
- Kurumkansky datsan (Курумканский дацан) in Kurumkan
- Sartul-Gegetuysky datsan (Сартул-Гэгэтуйский дацан) in Gegetuy
- Egituysky datsan (Эгитуйский дацан) in Egituy
- Gusinoozyorsky datsan (Гусиноозёрский (Тамчинский) дацан) in Gusinoye Ozero
- Zagustaysky datsan (Загустайский дацан «Дэчин Рабжилинг») in the Selenginsky District
- Sanaginsky datsan (Санагинский дацан) in Sanaga
- Ivolginsky datsan (Иволгинский дацан) in Verkhnyaya Ivolga
- Kizhinginsky datsan (Кижингинский дацан) in Kizhinga
- Baldan Breybun datsan (дацан Балдан Брэйбун) in Murochi
- Tugnuysky datsan (Тугнуйский дацан) in Mukhorshibir
- Okinsky datsan (Окинский дацан) in Orlik
- Tamchinsky datsan (Тамчинский дацан) in Gusinoye Ozero
- Kyrensky datsan (Кыренский дацан) in Kyren
- Khoymorsky datsan (Хойморский дацан) in Arshan
- Ugdansky datsan (Угданский дацан)
- Tseezhe-Burgaltaysky datsan (Цээжэ-Бургалтайский дацан)
- Ust-Ordynsky datsan (Усть-Ордынский (Абатанатский) дацан) in Ust-Ordynsky
- Aninsky datsan (Анинский дацан) in Ana
- Chesansky datsan (Чесанский дацан) in Chesan
- Tabangut-Ichyotuysky datsan (Табангут-Ичётуйский дацан «Дэчен Рабжалин») in the Dzhidinsky District
- Tsugolsky datsan (Цугольский дацан) in Tsugol
- Saint Petersburg Tibetan Temple
  - Datsan Gunzechoinei (дацан Гунзэчойнэй) in Saint Petersburg
- Wat Phra Dhammakaya Mocow in Moscow
- Yakutsky datsan (Якутский дацан; дацан в Якутске) in Yakutsk, Republic of Sakha (Yakutia). The northernmost Buddhist temple in the world
- Yangazhinsky datsan (Янгажинский дацан «Даши Ширбубулин)
- Chitinsky datsan (Читинский дацан "Дамба Брайбунлинг") in Chita, Zabaykalsky Krai

== See also ==
- List of Tibetan monasteries
- Buddhism in the Russian Federation
- Buddhism in Buryatia
- Buddhism in Kalmykia
  - Khurul, the Kalmyk equivalent of a datsan
