= Choynzon-Dorzho Iroltuyev =

Buryat religious leader; 11th Pandito Khambo Lama (1843–1918)

- Иролтын Чойнзон-Доржо
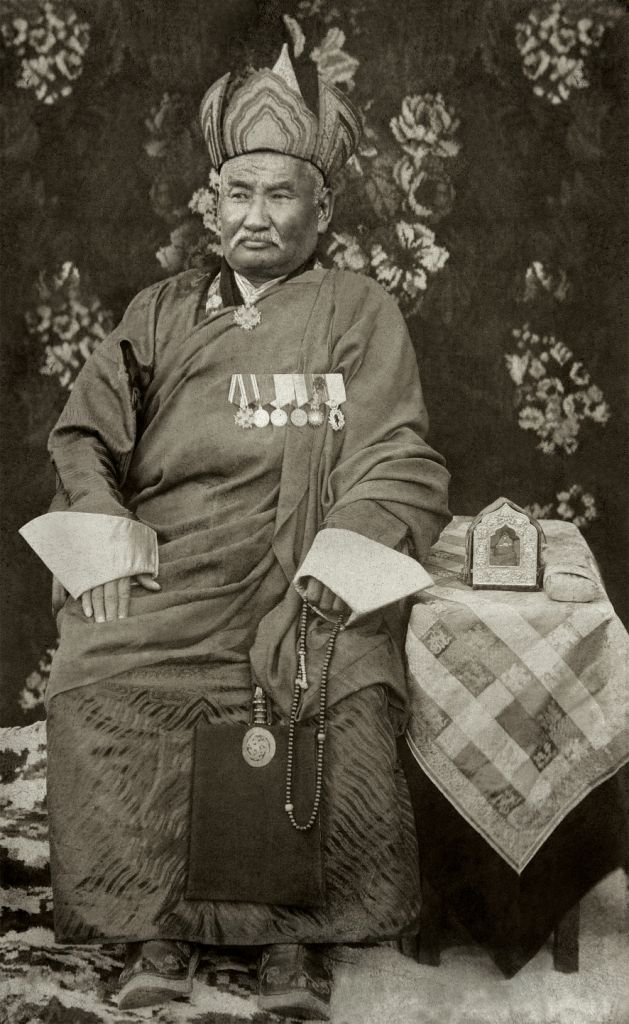

11th Pandito Khambo Lama
- In office 1896–1911
- Preceded by: Dampil Gomboyev
- Succeeded by: Dashi-Dorzho Itigilov

Personal life
- Born: 1843; Naryn-Atsagat, East Siberian Governorate-General (now Buryatia, Russia)
- Died: November 1918 (aged 74–75); Egita, State of Buryat-Mongolia (now Buryatia, Russia)

Religious life
- Religion: Tibetan Buddhism
- Temple: Atsagat datsan
- School: Gelug

Choynzon-Dorzho Iroltuyev (Note: Buryat: Иролтын Чойнзон-Доржо, romanized: Iroltyn Choinzon-Dorjo; Russian: Чойнзо́н-Доржи́ Иролту́ев) (1843 – November 1918) was a Buryat religious leader who was 11th Pandito Khambo Lama from 1896 to 1911. As Khambo Lama, Iroltuyev lent his support to Buddhist modernism and the Buryat autonomist movement during the Russian Revolution of 1905.

== Biography ==
Choynzon-Dorzho Iroltuyev was born in 1843 in the village of Naryn-Atsagat to a zaisan named Irolto. From 1872, he studied at Atsagat datsan as a samanera. He later studied at various monasteries in Mongolia and Tibet before returning to Russia in 1892 to become the abbot of Atsagat datsan. He met with future Emperor Nicholas II (then Tsesarevich) in 1891, and was a delegate at his 1896 coronation, representing the Buddhist clergy.

Iroltuyev was appointed as Pandito Khambo Lama in 1896. For six months in 1898 he travelled as a pilgrim to India, Thailand and China, collecting palm-leaf manuscripts, sculptures and relics, and 333 volumes of Buddhist texts in the Mongolian language. He also oversaw the construction of the Chita datsan in 1899, writing in a letter to Transbaikal Oblast governor Yevgeny Matsievsky that the datsan was "proof of our government's merciful attitude toward all faiths before the eyes of our foreign neighbours".

As Khambo Lama, Iroltuyev expressed support for Buddhist modernism, and was one of several such Buryat clergymen who developed a form of Buddhist modernism in order to maintain Buryat identity amidst Russian colonialism and Christianisation. During the Russian Revolution of 1905 Iroltuyev spoke publicly in favour of granting autonomy to the Transbaikal Oblast. Along with Agvan Dorzhiev he led the establishment of the "Khambo Lama Party", which advocated for a middle course between two competing currents among the nascent nationalist movement (restoration of the steppe dumas and establishment of zemstvos as in metropolitan Russia). He was also the head of the 1905 All-Buryatian Congress, and delivered Bato-Dalai Ochirov's demands for self-government and recognition of the Buryat language to Emperor Nicholas II.

Iroltuyev resigned as Khambo Lama in 1911 due to poor health, turning to Tibetan medicine as his primary occupation. He established a medical school in Naryn-Atsagat and worked as the school's chief physician. Following the outbreak of World War I he led fundraising efforts to support infirmaries and worked as a military chaplain and medic on the front line.

Iroltuyev died in November 1918 at Egituysky datsan. He was buried in the village of Shuluta, near the local datsan. In 1919, his body was exhumed and cremated and his ashes were interned in the datsan's stupa, in accordance with tradition.
