= Dashi-Dorzho Itigilov =

Buddhist lama (1852–1927)

- Этигэлэй Дашадоржо
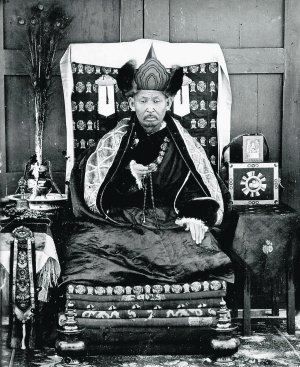

12th Pandito Khambo Lama
- In office 1911–1917
- Preceded by: Choynzon-Dorzho Iroltuyev
- Succeeded by: Tsybikzhap-Namzhil Laydanov

Personal life
- Born: 13 May 1852 Ulzy Dobo, Russian Empire (now Buryatia, Russia)
- Died: 15 June 1927 (aged 75)

Religious life
- Religion: Tibetan Buddhism
- Temple: Yangazhin Datsan
- School: Gelug

Dashi-Dorzho Itigilov, (Note: Buryat: Этигэлэй Дашадоржо, romanized: Etigelei Dashadorjo; Russian: Даши-Доржо Итигэлов) also transcribed at Etigelov or Itigelov, (13 May 1852 – 15 June 1927) was a Russian Buddhist lama of Buryat origin and the 12th Pandito Khambo Lama in the Tibetan Buddhist tradition.

After Itigilov's death in 1927, his body was exhumed and reburied in 1955 and again in 1972, showing an intact body. In 2002, the body was exhumed for a final time, receiving scientific and media attention for its well preserved state. Itigilov's body is currently kept in a glass case in a temple at the Ivolginsky datsan in Buryatia, 23 km from Ulan-Ude, where it has become a place of pilgrimage.

== Early life ==
Itigilov was born near the village of Orongoi in Buryatia, Russia and orphaned at a young age. Despite this, due to his intellectual promise, he enrolled in the Anninsky datsan, where he began his education and studied to pass Buddhist academic exams. He studied for almost twenty years. In 1895, Itigilov moved to the Tamchinsky datsan, where he received medical training. Then, in 1898, Itigilov began teaching philosophy at the Yangazhinsky datsan, where he became the leading monastery abbot in 1903.

== War efforts ==
Because of his Cossack heritage, Itigilov was supposed to complete a term of military service, but, thanks to a request from the leader of the Anninsky datsan where Itigilov was conducting his work and studies, he was excused from military service by the indemnities paid by four villages over the course of twenty years. However, when the Russo-Japanese War began in 1904, Itigilov felt motivated to provide his own abilities to aid in the war effort—performing Buddhist rites for deceased soldiers and soldiers deploying to the front.

In 1915, during World War I, Pandito Khambo Lama Itigilov and Damby Heshektuev traveled to various datsans in Siberia, collecting funds to contribute to the war. They were able to buy clothing, towels, tobacco products, berries, sugar, and other necessary products to send to the front line and hospitals in need. Itigilov also encouraged Buddhist monks with medical knowledge to volunteer to serve in hospitals for the Russian army; it is said that Itigilov donated much of his own funds in support of providing goods and medical help to those in need, around 5000 rubles. Because of his dedicated efforts in fundraising and aiding the wounded of the war, Emperor Nicholas II bestowed Itigilov with the award of the Order of Saint Anna, of the II degree.

== Religious leadership ==
In 1911, Itigilov was elected Pandito Khambo Lama of Siberian Buddhists. Since 1764, the Pandito Khambo Lama was recognized by the state as the leader of Eastern Siberian (predominantly Buryat and Evenki) Buddhists. This title originates from the Gelug Tradition of Tibetan Buddhism. According to Buryat Buddhist teachings, as Itigilov was chosen to be the twelfth Pandito Khambo Lama, he was recognized to be the reincarnation of the first Pandito Khambo Lama Zaiaev (1711–76). At this time, Itigilov was also proclaimed to be a tulku, a deeply enlightened individual who takes corporeal form to continue the lineage of specific teachings.

During the Tsarist period of Buryat Buddhism, the Khambo Lambo was not just a religious leader, but also performed official political and state duties. In 1913 Itigilov was invited to join a delegation of Buryats who would represent the Buryat nation at the celebration of the 300th anniversary of the House of Romanov in Saint Petersburg. While in St. Petersburg, Itigilov conducted the inaugural khural prayer at the St. Petersburg datsan. As Khambo Lama, Itigilov believed strongly in the prohibition of accepting donations for any reasons other than to benefit monasteries and Buddhist educational initiatives and encouraged his fellow monks to reject unnecessary luxury.

In regards to his political role in Buryatia, Itigilov was selected to be the chairman of the 2nd All-Buryat Congress held in Chita, Buryatia in July 1917 in the Tamchinsky datsan. As the spiritual leader of Siberian Buddhists, Itigilov also sought to regulate and modernize the role of Buryat Buddhism, promoting the study of Buryat language and minimizing outside influences on local Buddhist practices.

In a letter to the governor of Irkutsk, Itigilov wrote the following:

Bandido Khambo, February 6, 1913. No 8.

To the Irkutsk governor-general.

Every year, subjects of China, Tibet, and Mongolia visit Transbaikal and give themselves the title of khubilgans, i. e. divine reincarnations, supplied with permits granted by our diplomatic representatives within the aforementioned countries and often with additional documents from border commissars indicating that they are of high religious rank and their titles have a long historical lineage and so forth; […] In my opinion, foreign lamas caught in the act of attending to religious needs among the populace without written permission of the Bandido Khambo should be immediately escorted back abroad in the custody of local police. I humbly ask that you honor me by following up on this matter.

Bandido Khambo, signed by Itigelov ( Perepiska 1912: pp 1-3)

In September 1917, Itigilov stepped down as Pandito Khambo Lama for unknown reasons but continued to play a role in the leadership of the Yangazhinsky datsan and the education of students at the monastery.

== Writings ==
Over his lifetime, Itigilov wrote more than 50 works on Buddhist philosophy, with some of his most well-known writings focusing on the concept of emptiness (Śūnyatā) in Buddhist cosmology. He also completed a volume called Zhor, a text on Tibetan pharmacology influenced by his own medical training. Itigilov's writings were written in the classical Mongolian language, as were many of the records of his life which were documented by his family and fellow monks.

Shortly before his death in 1927, Itigilov wrote his final text. This final work was kept in the Barga region of Mongolian China from the 1930s until 1966, when it was returned to the Ivolginsky datsan by Galeg Balbar-lama. The text reflects on the status of life and death through the lens of Buddhist philosophy. A fragment can be seen below, translated into Russian by Hambo Lama Ayusheyev:

Во время одинокого ухода в следующий мир,

Все твое богатство, родные, близкие,

Оставшись на родной стороне, не последуют за тобой.

Эти богатства безумно собранные и накопленные,

Превратятся в особый яд и станут бесполезными,

Так учили все предыдущие Будды.

Бесстрастно изучив земную жизнь, начинайте с сегодняшнего дня

Практику Десяти Благих Деяний – незамедлительно!!!

Больше особо сказанного нет в моем окончательном послании,

Когда пребываю в данной жизни.

(Translated into Russian by Hambo Lama Ayusheyev)

== Death ==
A commonly told story from the end of Itigilov's life recounts his meeting with Lama Agvan Dorzhiev, who had just returned to the Soviet Union from Mongolia in 1921. Itigelov tells him: “You have come back here in vain. It would have been better to stay abroad. I assure you that very soon the arrests of Lamas will begin. If you fall into the hands of the Chekists, they will not let you live!” Dorzhiev asks him: “Why don't you go abroad?”. Itigilov replies: “They will not have time to take me.”

In 1927, Itigilov advised his own students to flee to Mongolia, but he stayed behind in Buryatia, where he chanted Hug Namshi, a mantra for the dead, while seated in the lotus position. In the lotus position vajra, his left hand remained opened while the right hand symbolized his preaching of sutra. After his chanting, Itigilov passed away. He was buried while still on the lotus position, and his last request to his fellow monks was to exhume him from the ground after 30 years. Though the exact burial place was secret, it was in the Huhe Zurhen district of Buryatia (modern Ivolginsky District).

After Itigelov's death, the monastery was destroyed by the orders of the Soviet government and village was collectivized. However, the cabin where Itigilov lived was relocated and protected by a distant cousin of Itigilov, who kept oral tradition of the Khambo Lama in the family.

=== Exhumations ===
Itigilov's body was first exhumed in 1955, but without publicity because of fear of persecution from Soviet authorities. According to the current and 24th Pandito Hambo Lama, Damba Ayusheev: ''Nobody could talk about it then. To bring him back to the temple—it was forbidden, impossible. So he was put back.'' Itigilov's body was reburied in a wooden coffin packed with salt, and exhumed and then reburied again in 1972.

In 2002, Itigilov appeared in a dream to a young lama at the Ivolginsky monastery and announced that it was the time for his return. The young lama, Bimba Dorzhiyev, became curious about the burial and remains of Itigilov. An 88 year-old worshiper, whose father-in-law had been present when the coffin was opened in 1955, informed the lama of the grave's location. Then, on 11 September 2002, the grave was opened and the body was exhumed in the presence of a photographer, two forensic experts, and a dozen witnesses, where Itigilov's body was found to be remarkably preserved. The body was then brought to Ivolginsk Datsan and placed on the second floor of one of the monastery's temples, behind curtains and a locked door.

The preserved state of Itigilov's body raised curiosities in both domestic and international press for the so-called “incorruptible” or "imperishable" body (Sokushinbutsu). Scientists offered theories about how the body was so naturally well preserved. A scientist at the Center for Biomedical Technologies in Moscow, Vladislav L. Kozeltsev, commentated that the salt that was packed into Itigilov's coffin might have slowed the decay of the body but did not fully explain Itigilov's preservation. However, “more likely, Mr. Kozeltsev said, Itigilov suffered from a defect in the gene that hastens the decomposition of the body's cellular structure after death.”

According to Khambo Lama Ayusheyev and other Buryat Buddhists, Itigilov's body is so well preserved because the Lama is still living, having achieved the higher meditative state known as śūnyatā, or emptiness.

== Legacy ==
In 2004, the foundation of the Khambo Lama Itigelov Institute was founded at the Ivolginsky datsan to promote the preservation of Itigilov's spiritual history and teachings. This project was organized by the 24th Khambo Lama Damba Ayusheev.

In 2005, researchers found a five-page text which was attributed to Itigelov. This writing was one of thousands of manuscripts in Ivolginsk monastery. With little known about the document's history or existence before it was discovered, it was suggested that “[the text] had intentionally revealed itself through the agency of Itigelov.” In the work, Itigilov recounts his previous life as the first Khambo Lama Zaiaev. In this previous life, he met with the Dalai and Panchen Lama, to whom he gave gifts and received information about his other lives. The document also offers as list of these former lives, which include “five Indian, five Tibetan, and two Buryat incarnations.”

In 2008, a new temple to house and honor the body of Itigilov was constructed near the Ivolginsky datsan. The wooden cabin where the Khambo Lama lived during the later years of his life was also moved to the Ivolginsky datsan. This new palace was built “based on a photograph of a temple found in the Museum of the History of Buryatia;” this former temple was part of the Yangazhinsky monastery destroyed in the 1930s. That building is alleged to have been constructed by Itigelov himself when he worked as a leader at the monastery.

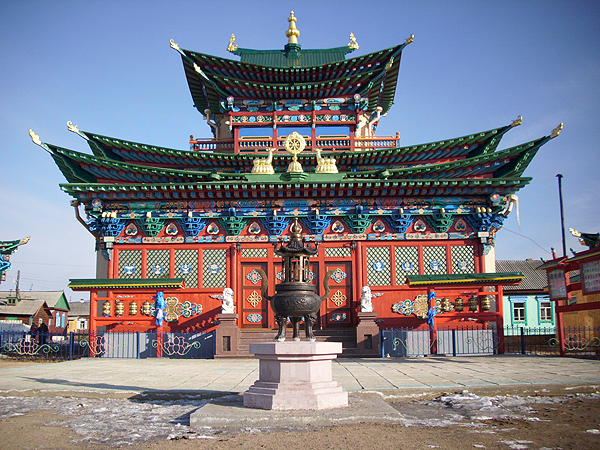
Itigilov's temple at the Ivolginsky datsan

Since the construction of the new palace where Itigilov's body was placed, the site has become an important place of pilgrimage for both Buddhist practitioners and those interested in Itigilov's history and surprising preserved state. It is believed that a pilgrimage to Itigilov can create miracles, as Itigilov can grant onlooker's wishes and his presence corrects one's karma. Furthermore, it is said that diseases are healed upon touching his hands, and people are reported to have left their crutches at the temple.” The former President Dmitry Medvedev and President Vladimir Putin have both visited the site to see Itigilov. Medvedev visited in 2009 and Putin toured the Ivolginsky datsan in 2013, discussing Buryatian charitable and Buddhist education initiatives with the monks of the datsan.

The rediscovery of the body of Itigilov is also connected to a revival of Buryat Buddhism which can be seen in the “construction of a new cult of Pandito Khambo Lama Itigelov which is actively supported in the media and social networks.” On the social media platform VKontakte, based out of Saint Petersburg, there is a community group “Khambo Lama Dashi-Dorzho Itigelov” where online members discuss Itigilov's life and teachings, showing the influence of Buddhist social media communities.

The exhumed body of Itigilov

== See also ==
- Buddhist mummies
- Incorruptibility
- Sokushinbutsu
