= Gusinoye Ozero =

Gusinoye Ozero may refer to:

- Lake Gusinoye, a lake in the Republic of Buryatia, Russia
- Gusinoye Ozero (rural locality), a rural locality (a selo) located on that lake
