= Sredny Shergoldzhin =

Sredny Shergoldzhin Средний Шергольджин
- Selo
- Location within Zabaykalsky Krai Location within Russia
- Coordinates: 50°11′N 108°19′E
- Country: Russia
- Region: Zabaykalsky Krai
- District: Krasnochikoysky District
- Time zone: UTC+9:00

Sredny Shergoldzhin (Russian: Средний Шергольджин) is a rural locality (a selo) in Krasnochikoysky District, Zabaykalsky Krai, Russia. Population: 14 (2010 census); 29 (2002 census); There is 1 street in this selo.

== Geography ==
This rural locality is located 41 km from Krasny Chikoy (the district's administrative centre), 426 km from Chita (capital of Zabaykalsky Krai) and 5,072 km from Moscow. Bursomon is the nearest rural locality.
