= Damba Ayusheev =

24th Pandito Khambo Lama (since 1995)

- Аюшеев Бадмын Дамба
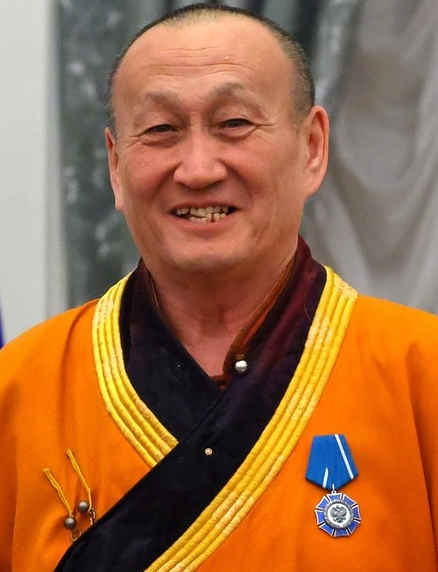
- Ayusheev in 2023

24th Pandito Khambo Lama
- Incumbent
- Assumed office 28 April 1995
- Preceded by: Choi Dorjee Budayev

Personal life
- Born: Vasily Borisovich Ayusheev (Russian: Василий Борисович Аюшеев); 1 September 1962 (age 64) Bursomon, Chita Oblast, Russian SFSR, Soviet Union
- Parent: Boris Ayusheev (father)

Religious life
- Religion: Tibetan Buddhism
- Denomination: Vajrayana
- Temple: Tsongol Datsan
- School: Gelug
- Monastic name: Damba Badmaevich (Russian: Дамба Бадмаевич)

Damba Badmaevich Ayusheev (Note: Buryat: Аюшеев Бадмын Дамба, Mongolian:ᠠᠶᠱᠧᠸ ᠪᠠᠳᠮ᠎ᠠ ᠶᠢᠨ ᠳᠠᠮᠪᠠ, romanized: Aûsheev Badmyn Damba; Mongolian: Аюушийн Дамба, romanized: Ayuushiin Damba Russian: Дамба́ Бадма́евич Аюше́ев) (born 1 September 1962) is a Russian Vajrayana Buddhist monk who is the 24th and incumbent Pandito Khambo Lama.

== Biography ==
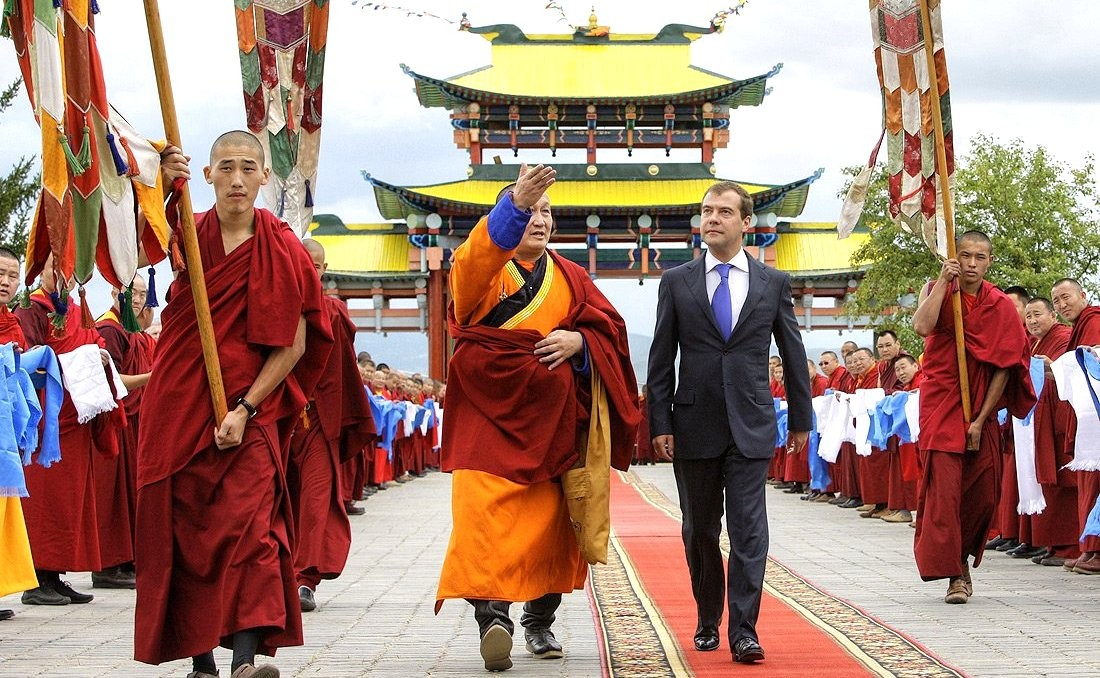
August 2009, with Dmitry Medvedev, President of Russian Federation

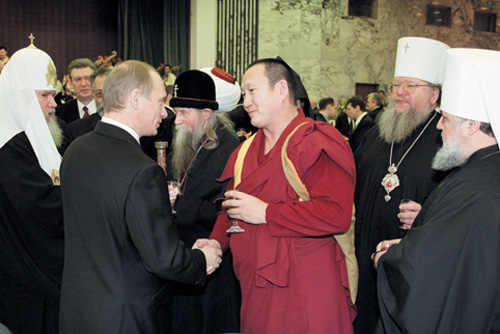
December 2000, with Vladimir Putin, President of Russian Federation

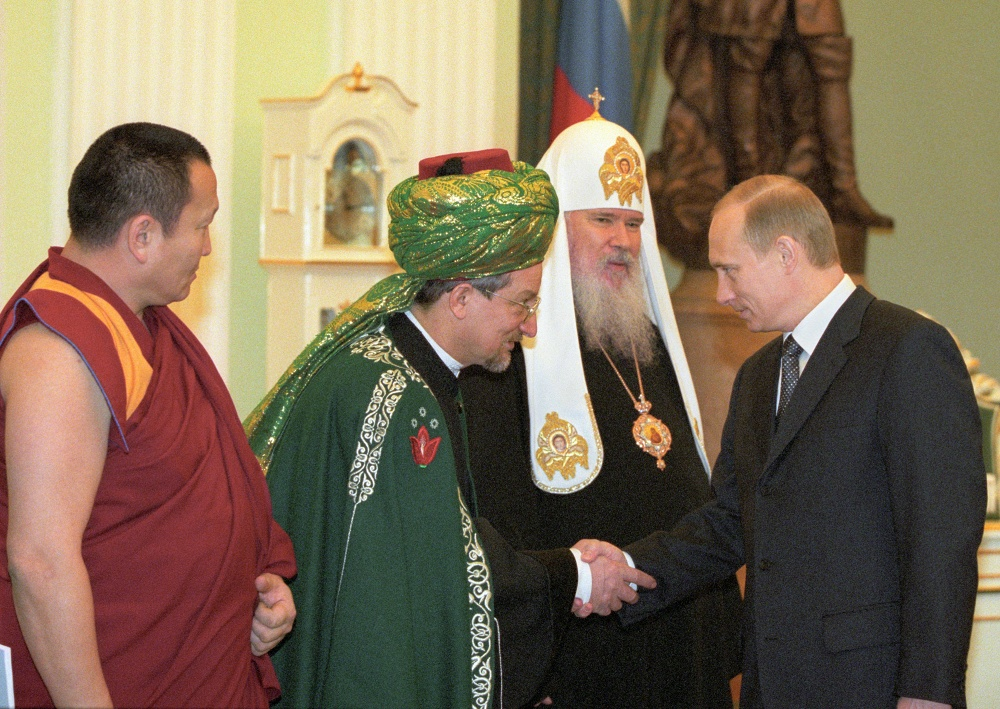
February 2001, with Vladimir Putin, President of Russian Federation

Damba Ayusheev was born on 1 September 1962 to Buryat Mongolian parents in the village of Bursomon, in the far east of the then Soviet Union, approximately 300 km north of Ulaanbaatar, the capital of Mongolia.

In 1980, Ayusheev graduated from Petrovsk-Zabaykalsky Pedagogical College. This led to employment as a teacher at Kukursk secondary school in Agin-Buryat Autonomous Okrug.

In 1983, through the advocacy of the Aginsky Datsan (a 200 year old Buddhist monastery in the small town of Aginskoye in Siberia), Ayusheev entered Zanabazar Buddhist University in Ulan-Bator, Mongolia. He graduated in 1988 with qualification in Tibetan Medicine. From there, Ayusheev became curator (dean) of soviet students. He then served as Amchi Lama (a holistic carer) at Ivolginsky datsan in Russia's far east.

In 1991, Ayusheev was appointed Shireete Lama (abbot) at Baldan Breybun datsan in the settlement of Murochi, Kyakhtinsky district, also in the Russian Far East. This datsan in Buryatia district was the first to be revived after the fall of the Soviet Union. Ayusheev oversaw the building of a new Tsogchen dugan on the site of one demolished in the 1930s. It was completed in two years.

On 2 August 1995, Ayusheev became a member of the Council for Cooperation with Religious Associations under the Russian President and on 23 December 1998, he became a member of the Presidium of Interreligious Council of Russia. On 3 March 2004, Aysheev became a member of the Presidium of the Interreligious Council of the Commonwealth of Independent States (CIS). He is also Vice President of the Asian Buddhist Conference for Peace.

== Khambo Lama ==
On 28 April 1995, Ayusheev was elected to the position of 24th Khambo Lama and Chairman of the Central Spiritual Administration of Buddhists of the Russian Federation (later renamed as the Buddhist Traditional Sangha of Russia). As such, he presides over all Buddhists in Russia.

He was re-elected in 2023 to continue in the role until 2028. On that occasion, he spoke about the Sangha's ongoing and new projects, including the organisation of sewing shops to manufacture the necessities for the special military operation and the continuation of the "Social Flock" project, the creation of a leather and fur workshop and the felting process.

During Ayusheev's tenure, Verkhnyaya Berezovka, an estate on the outskirts of Ulan-Ude was established as a second residence of the Khambo Lama. (Ulan-Ude is the capital city of Buryatia, located north of the border between Russia and Mongolia, about 400 km from Ulaanbaatar). In nearby districts, the Ivolginsky Datsan and the Aginsky datsan were established.

== Commentary on Russian invasion of Ukraine ==
In 2022, Ayusheev expressed support for the Russian invasion of Ukraine. He is quoted, "We must have a strong and reliable rear. With us are our sahusans, with us are our great Hambo Lamas, with us is the Buddha". At a Buddhist conference at Ivolginsky datsan in 2023, Ayasheev told the Russian news agency TASS, "Our Buddhists today are fighting for the Russian world, for the Slavic world, to preserve their Mongolian world. And when the country is in a very difficult situation, our Buddhists, including [military] units from Buryatia, worthily defend the interests of our country against all of Europe and the West. We are proud of this."

== Commentary on Buddhism in Buryatia ==
Ayusheev's views on Buddhism in Buryatia are described as "anti-urban". Dondukov et al write,

In Ulan-Ude there is not a single datsan (temple) belonging to the Buddhist Traditional Sangha of Russia (BTSR), the largest association of traditional Buddhists in Russia. Pandito Khambo Lama Damba Ayusheev, the head of BTSR, often criticizes urban life and promotes traditional values and lifestyle. A preliminary content analysis of articles and interviews with Pandito Khambo Lama Damba Ayusheev led us to the conclusion that his views can be considered anti-urban. The experience of ruralism of Pandito Khambo Lama Damba Ayusheev is valuable because it is not a theoretical anti-urbanism. His views have a bearing on practice: his initiative of livestock herding is seen as "a tool for solving the problem of the depopulation of Buryat villages".

Darima Amogolonova, a senior researcher at the Institute for Mongolian, Buddhist and Tibetan Studies at the Siberian campus of the Russian Academy of Sciences notes that Ayusheev has a critical opinion of Buryat shamanism; that he objects to the influence other Russian Buddhist organizations on the Buddhist Traditional Sangkha of Russia; and that he "does not mark the frontiers between confessions and considers everyone who believes in supreme forces by 60% as a Buddhist".

== Honours ==
On 4 June 2011, by the Decree of the President of Mongolia, Ayusheev was awarded the Order of the Polar Star for contribution to the strengthening Russian-Mongolian relations. This is the highest award which Mongolia can bestow on a foreign citizen. Dambyn Darligjava, the Attorney General of Mongolia presented the award.

On 17 June 2011, Ayusheev was awarded the medal of Kemerovo Oblast "For Faith and Kindness" at Ivolginsky datsan, by representatives of Kemerovo regional administration.

On 11 February 2013, by the Decree of the President of Russia Vladimir Putin, Ayusheev was awarded the Order of Friendship.

== Printed sources ==
- Амоголонова, Д. Д. (2015). Буддизм в Бурятии: российское государство и конфессиональная конкуренция. In И.Ф. Поповой; Т.Д. Скрынниковой (eds.). Страны и народы Востока. Вып. XXXVI: Религии на Востоке (in Russian). Moscow: Наука. pp. 5–41. ISBN 978-5-02-039952-5.
