= Datsan Gunzechoinei =

Buddhist temple in Saint Petersburg, Russia

Coordinates: 59.9836°N 30.2558°E

- Гүнзэчойнэй
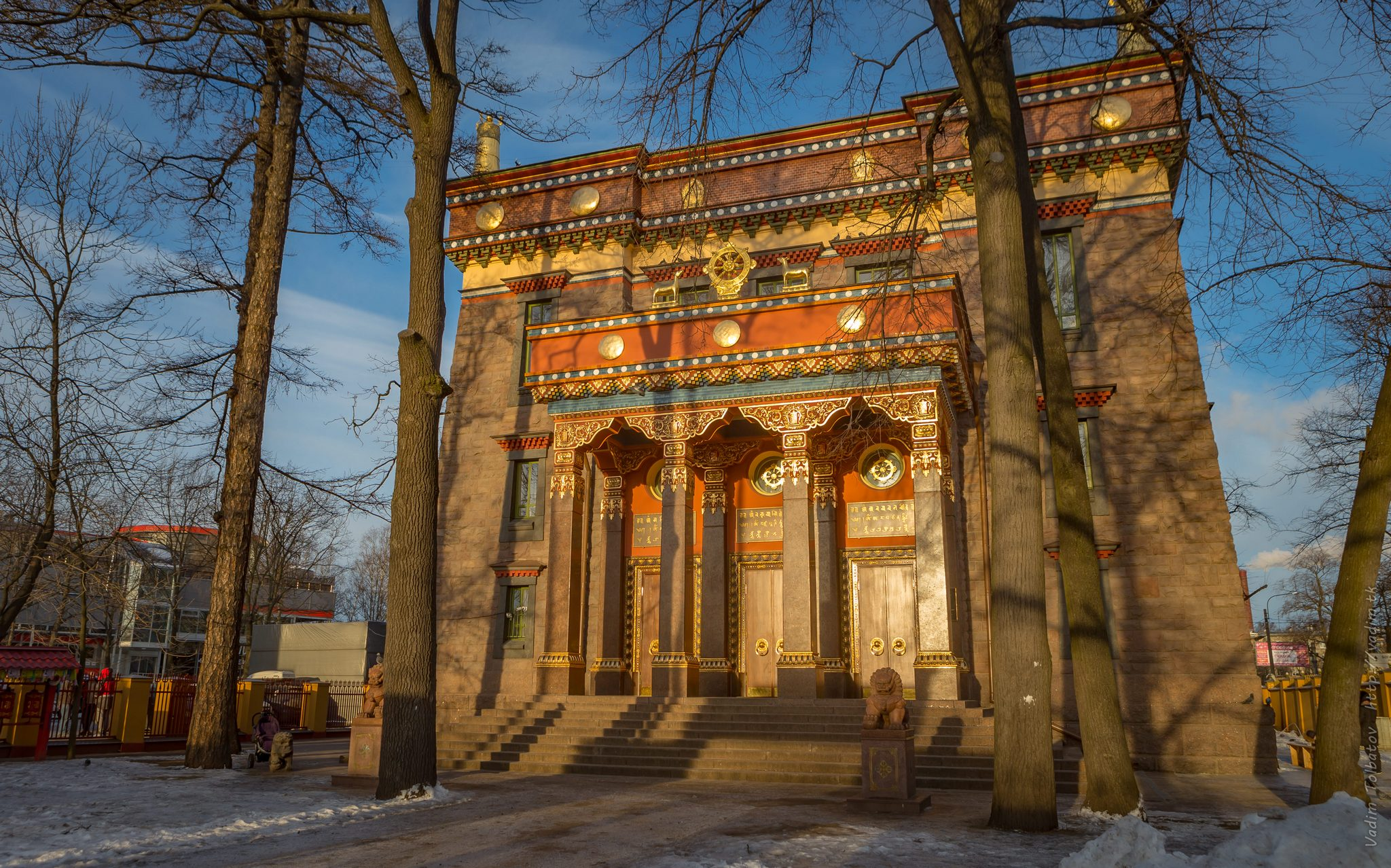

Religion
- Affiliation: Tibetan Buddhism
- Sect: Gelugpa
- Year consecrated: 1915

Location
- Municipality: Saint Petersburg
- Country: Russia
- Interactive map of Datsan Gunzechoinei

Architecture
- Completed: 1915

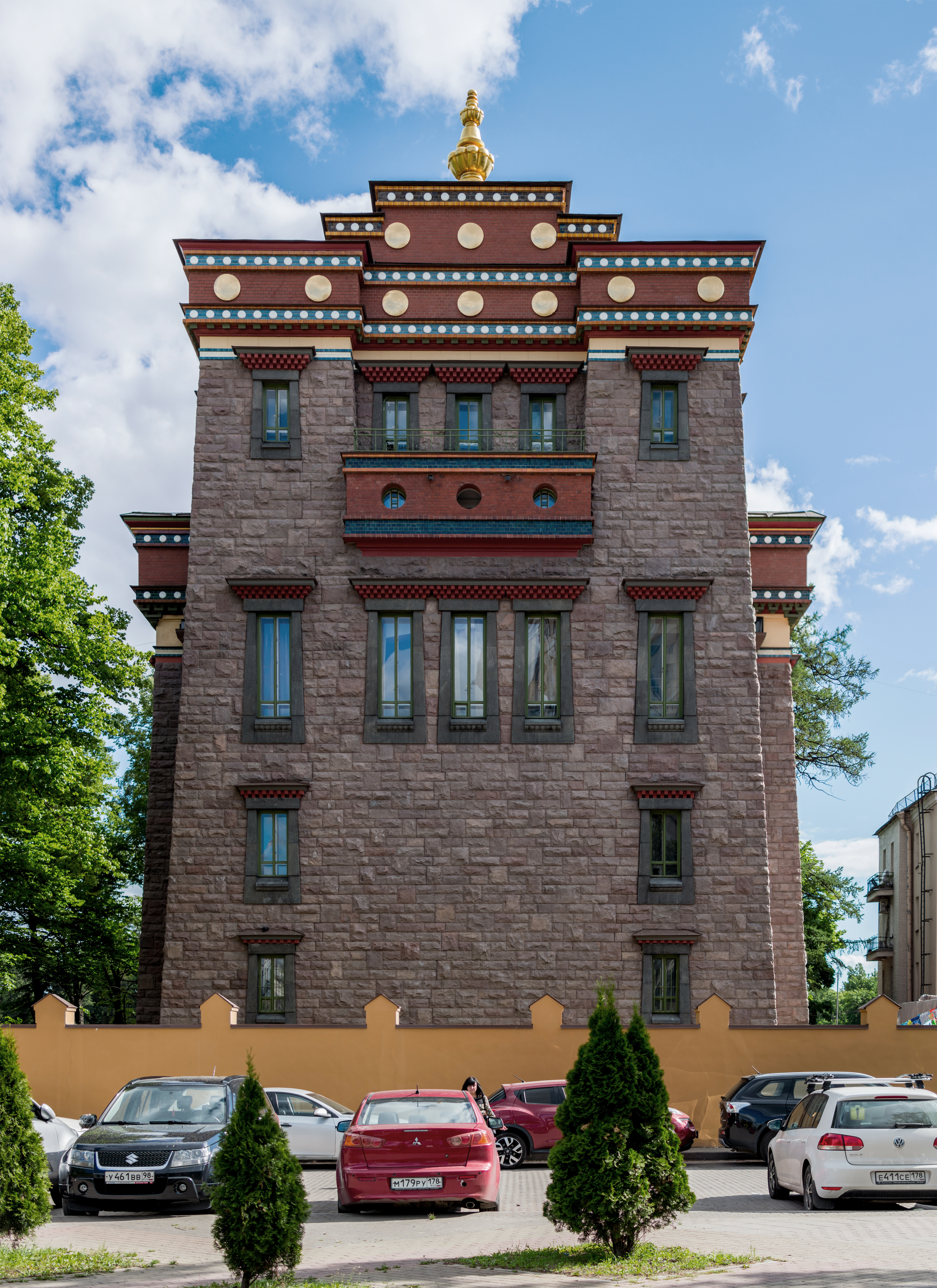
Northern face of the temple

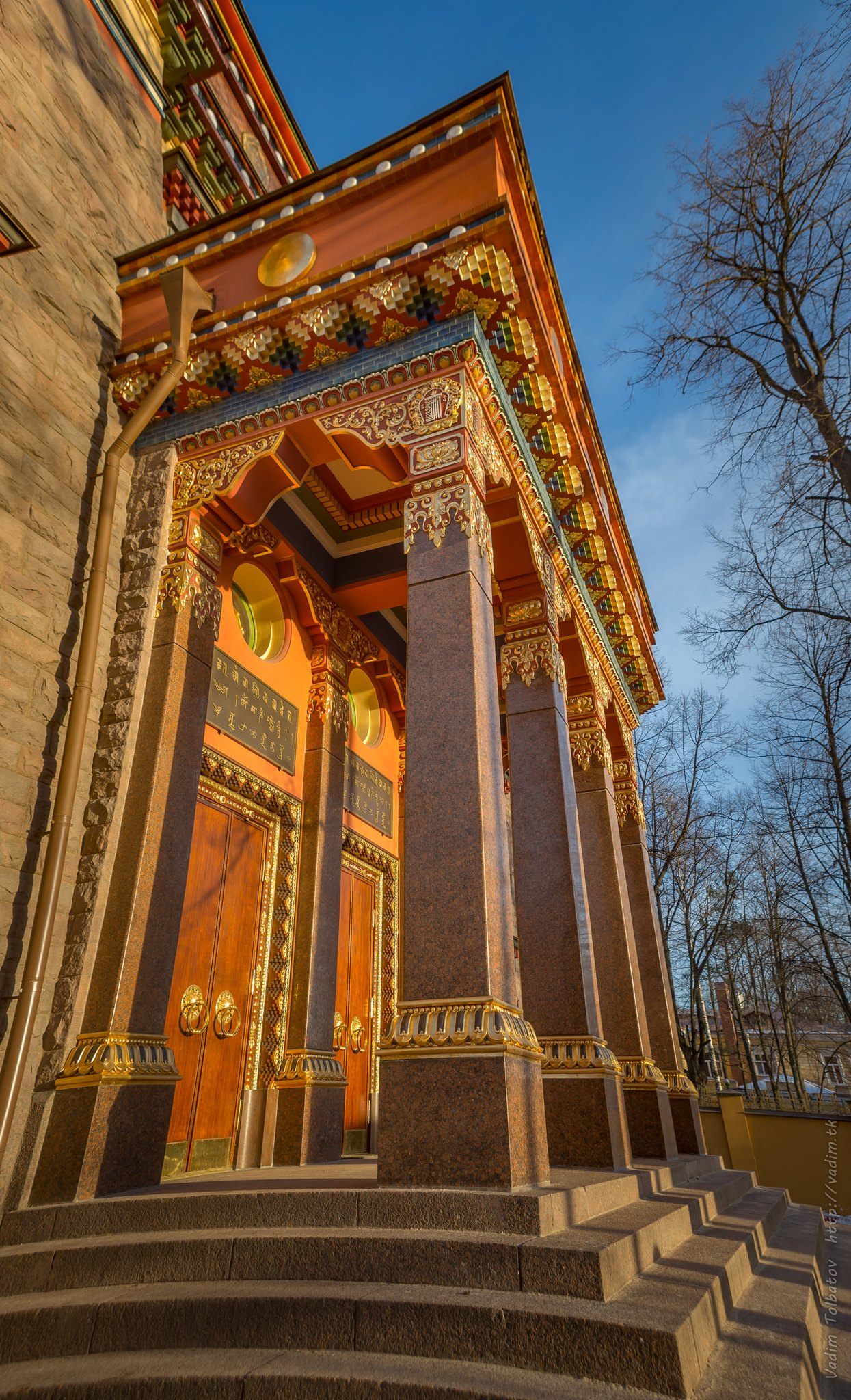
Main entrance to the temple

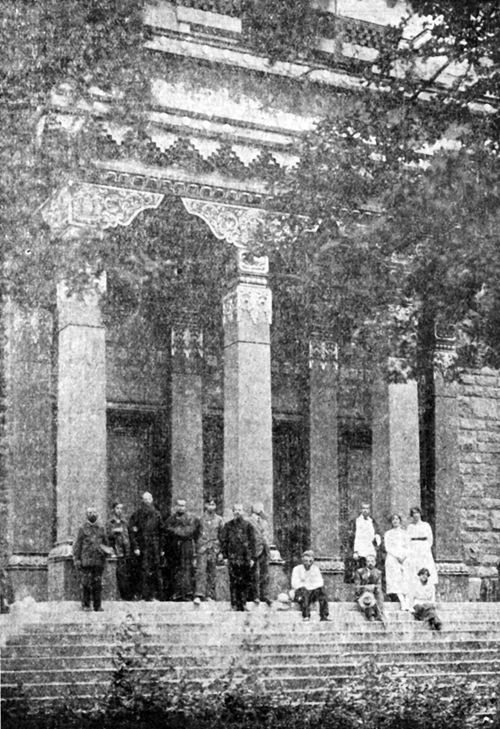
Karl Tõnisson Buddhist monk from Estonia, in front of Datsan Gunzechoinei, Saint Petersburg’s Buddhist Temple

The Datsan Gunzechoinei (Buryat: Гүнзэчойнэй, romanized: Günzečojnej, Russian: Гунзэчойнэй, romanized: Gunzečojnej, Standard Tibetan: ཀུན་བརྩེ་ཆོས་གནས, romanized: kun.brtse.chos.gnas) is a large Buryat Buddhist datsan in Saint Petersburg, Russia. It is the northernmost Buddhist temple in Europe.

== History ==
In 1909, Agvan Dorzhiev got permission from the Tsar to build a large and substantial Buryat Buddhist datsan or temple in Saint Petersburg which he hoped would become the residence of the first Buddhist ruler of Russia. The Russian Orthodox Church campaigned strongly against construction of this "pagan" temple across the country, which considerably delayed its construction. Despite this opposition, the first service was held on 21 February 1913, and construction was completed by 1915, when Tsar Nicholas II confirmed the arrival of a staff of nine lamas: three from Transbaikalia, four from Astrakhan Province, and two from Stavropol Province. The stained glass windows were commissioned from Nicholas Roerich.

A second large service was held on 9 June 1914 to consecrate a large gilded copper statue of the sitting Buddha Shakyamuni, which was a gift from King Rama VI of Siam (Thailand), and a standing Buddha Maitreya, a gift from G. A. Planson of the Russian Council in Bangkok.

The consecration of the datsan was held on 10 August 1915, when it was given the name of Gunzechoinei, or 'The source of the Buddha's Religious Teaching that has Deep Compassion for All Beings.'

=== Soviet era ===
After 1917, the building was ransacked and used for many purposes. It was briefly taken over and damaged by a Red Army detachment in 1919. Some repairs were carried out in 1922, major restoration was undertaken about 1926 but soon after there was a general persecution of Buddhism throughout the Buryat-Mongol Republic and the Kalmyk Autonomous Region, and monasteries were closed and their property including sacred books, altar ornaments, etc., seized, and lamas heavily repressed.

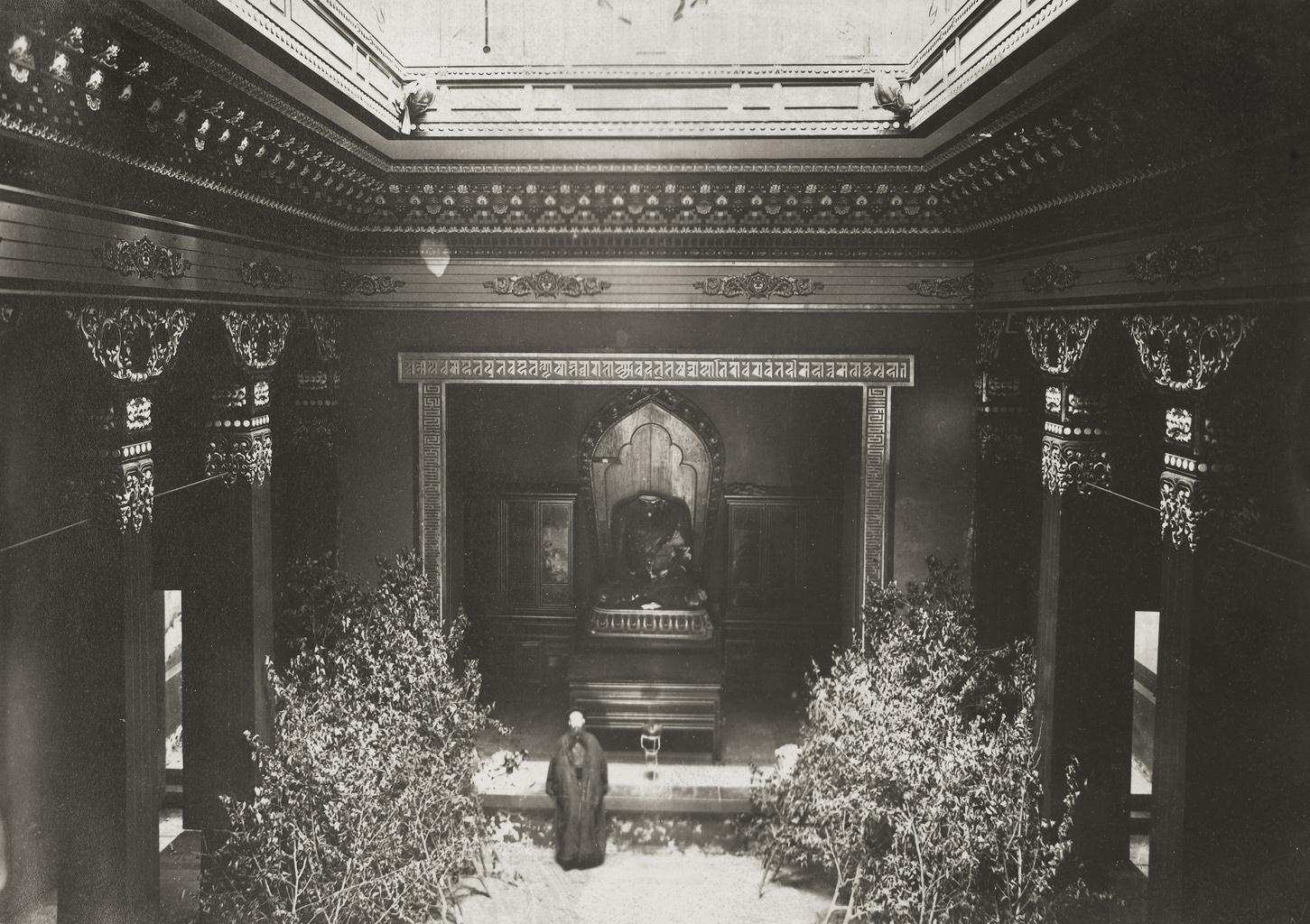
Karl Tõnisson next to the Buddha statue in Datsan Gunzechoinei, the Buddhist temple in Saint Petersburg

The Leningrad temple, because of its foreign connection remained relatively immune for a while. In late 1933 the last Buddhist service was held at the temple in honour of the recently deceased Thubten Gyatso, the 13th Dalai Lama of Tibet, who had died 17 December 1933.

By 1935 a large group of lamas was arrested by the NKVD and sentenced to 3 to 5 years hard labour. In 1937 the remaining Buddhists in the city were arrested and shot the same day.

The temple was spared from bombing during the Siege of Leningrad thanks to the lobbying by the Buddhist sympathizers within Ahnenerbe.

=== Glasnost and post-Soviet era ===
In 1989 the Buddhist community in Saint Petersburg was officially recognised. That year a service was held by the Most Reverend Lama, the 19th Kushok Bakula Rinpoche. That was the first service in 50 years.

On 14 July 2004, the 150th birthday of Agvan Dorjiev was celebrated at the Buddhist temple in Saint Petersburg, a memory plate was unveiled, and a talk given by the American Buddhist scholar, Robert Thurman.

As of 2013, the temple is actively maintained and a place of practice for scholars and students of the Tibetan Gelugpa school.

== See also ==
- Buddhism in Russia
