= Khambo Lama =

Tibetan Buddhist religious title in Mongolia and Russia

A Khambo Lama (Standard Tibetan: མཁན་པོ་བླ་མ; Mongolian: Хамба лам; Russian: Хамбо-лама) is the title given to the senior lama of a Buddhist monastery in Mongolia and Russia. It is sometimes translated to the Christian title abbot.

It is the title of the spiritual leader of Buddhists in Buryatia (from the 18th century); the leaders of Buddhists in Tuva and Altai; and the head of Mongolian Buddhists.

It is derived from the Buddhist academic title Khenpo.

== Current khambo lamas ==
=== Mongolia ===
- Khambo lama of Gandantegchinlen Khiid - Khamba Lama, Gabju Demberelyn Choijamts

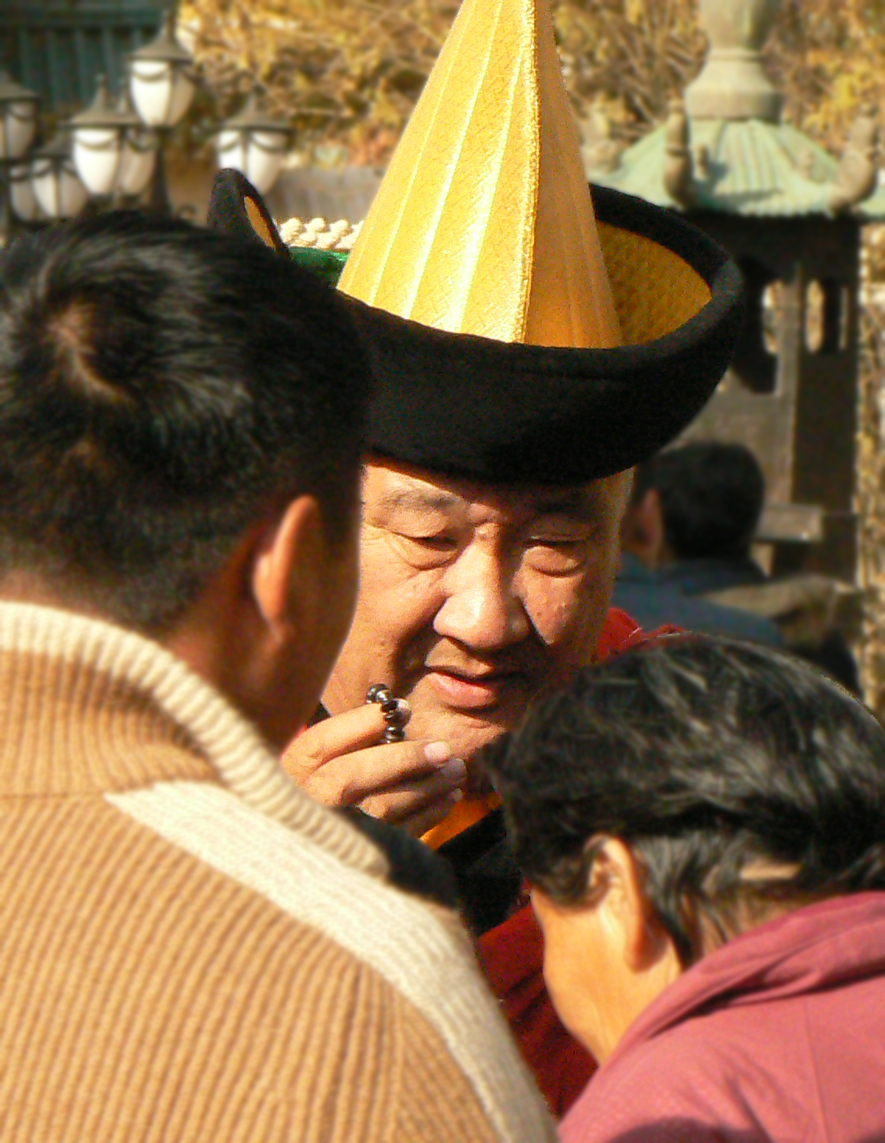
Khamba Demberelyn Choijamts

=== Russia ===
- Buryatia - Pandito Hambo Lama XXIV - Damba Badmayevich Ayusheev
- Tuva - Kamba Lama V of Tuva - Saldum Baska (Tsultim Tenzin)
- Altai - Hambo Lama - Mergen Vasilyevich Shagayev

== Gallery ==
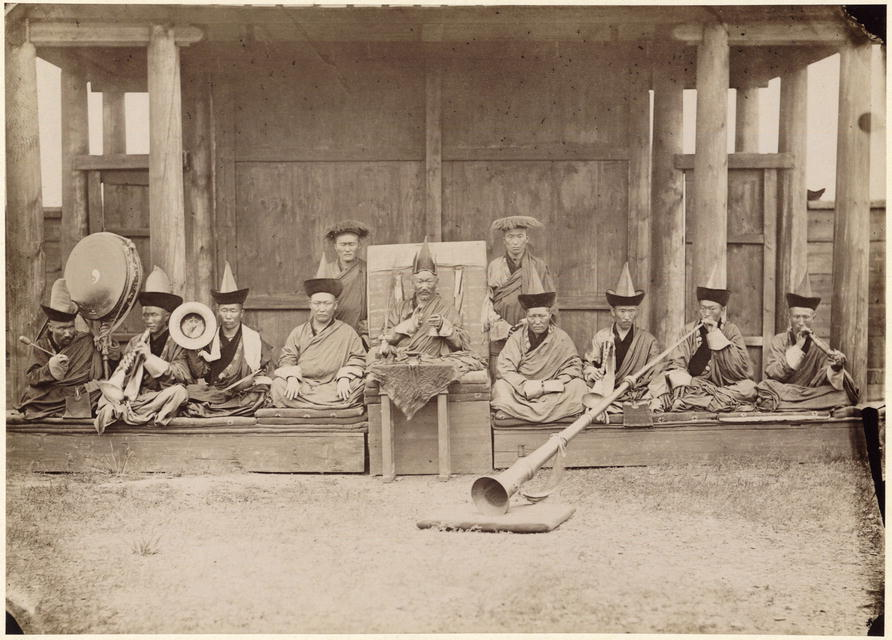
Khambo lama of the Tamchinsky datsan in 1886

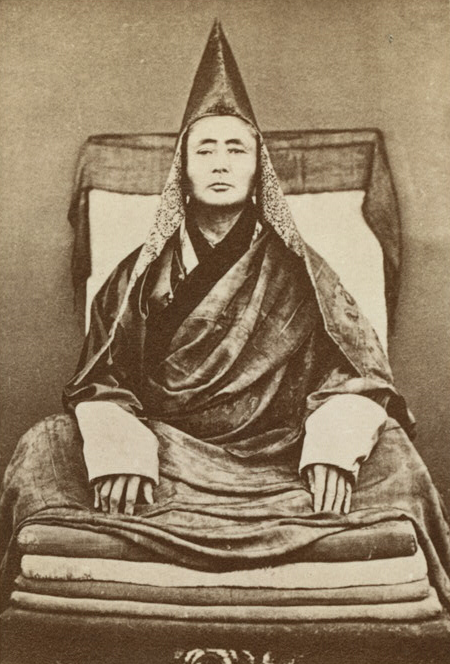
Late 1800s photo of Khamba Lama of the Selenginsk

== See also ==
- Buddhism in Mongolia
- Buddhism in Russia
- Buddhism in Buryatia
- Buddhism in Kalmykia
