= Ust-Burgaltay =

Ust-Burgaltay Усть-Бургалтай
- Ulus
- Location within Republic of Buryatia Location within Russia
- Coordinates: 50°25′N 104°06′E
- Country: Russia
- Region: Republic of Buryatia
- District: Zakamensky District
- Time zone: UTC+8:00

Ust-Burgaltay (Russian: Усть-Бургалтай) is a rural locality (an ulus) in Zakamensky District, Republic of Buryatia, Russia. The population was 394 as of 2010. There are 8 streets.

== Geography ==
Ust-Burgaltay is located 69 km east of Zakamensk (the district's administrative centre) by road. Mikhaylovka is the nearest rural locality.
