= Orongoy =

Orongoy Оронгой
- Settlement
- Location within Republic of Buryatia Location within Russia
- Coordinates: 51°31′N 107°04′E
- Country: Russia
- Region: Republic of Buryatia
- District: Ivolginsky District
- Time zone: UTC+8:00

Orongoy (Russian: Оронгой; Buryat: Оронго, Orongo) is a rural locality (a settlement) in Ivolginsky District, Republic of Buryatia, Russia. The population was 1,061 as of 2010. There are 5 streets.

== Geography ==
Orongoy is located 32 km southwest of Ivolginsk (the district's administrative centre) by road. Orongoy (ulus) is the nearest rural locality.
