= Dodo-Ichyotuy =

Dodo-Ichyotuy Додо-Ичётуй
- Selo
- Location within Republic of Buryatia Location within Russia
- Coordinates: 50°38′N 105°27′E
- Country: Russia
- Region: Republic of Buryatia
- District: Dzhidinsky District
- Time zone: UTC+8:00

Dodo-Ichyotuy (Russian: Додо-Ичётуй; Buryat: Доодо Υшөөтэй, Doodo Üshöötei) is a rural locality (a selo) in Dzhidinsky District, Republic of Buryatia, Russia. The population was 350 as of 2017. There are 61 streets.

== Geography ==
Dodo-Ichyotuy is located 11 km east of Petropavlovka (the district's administrative centre) by road. Petropavlovka is the nearest rural locality.
