= Shuluta =

Shuluta Шулута
- Ulus
- Location within Republic of Buryatia Location within Russia
- Coordinates: 52°05′N 108°22′E
- Country: Russia
- Region: Republic of Buryatia
- District: Zaigrayevsky District
- Time zone: UTC+8:00

Shuluta (Russian: Шулута; Buryat: Шулуута, Shuluuta) is a rural locality (an ulus) in Zaigrayevsky District, Republic of Buryatia, Russia. The population was 186 as of 2010.

== Geography ==
Shuluta is located 36 km north of Zaigrayevo (the district's administrative centre) by road. Pervomayevka is the nearest rural locality.
