= Chesan =

Chesan Чесан
- Selo
- Location within Republic of Buryatia Location within Russia
- Coordinates: 51°57′N 110°30′E
- Country: Russia
- Region: Republic of Buryatia
- District: Kizhinginsky District
- Time zone: UTC+8:00

Chesan (Russian: Чесан; Buryat: Чисаана / Шисаана, Chisaana / Shisaana) is a rural locality (a selo) in Kizhinginsky District, Republic of Buryatia, Russia. The population was 484 as of 2010. There are 10 streets.

== Geography ==
Chesan is located 54 km northeast of Kizhinga (the district's administrative centre) by road. Bulak is the nearest rural locality.
