= Gegetuy =

Gegetuy Гэгэтуй
- Selo
- Location within Republic of Buryatia Location within Russia
- Coordinates: 50°38′N 105°13′E
- Country: Russia
- Region: Republic of Buryatia
- District: Dzhidinsky District
- Time zone: UTC+8:00

Gegetuy (Russian: Гэгэтуй; Buryat: Гэгээтэ, Gegeete) is a rural locality (a selo) in Dzhidinsky District, Republic of Buryatia, Russia. The population was 1,253 as of 2010. There are 7 streets.

== Geography ==
Gegetuy is located 10 km northwest of Petropavlovka (the district's administrative centre) by road. Bulyk is the nearest rural locality.
