= Bursomon =

Bursomon Бурсомон
- Selo
- Location within Zabaykalsky Krai Location within Russia
- Coordinates: 50°10′N 108°15′E
- Country: Russia
- Region: Zabaykalsky Krai
- District: Krasnochikoysky District
- Time zone: UTC+9:00

Bursomon (Russian: Бурсомон) is a rural locality (a selo) in Krasnochikoysky District, Zabaykalsky Krai, Russia. Population: 135 (2021 census); 165 (2010 census); 164 (2002 census); There are 4 streets in this selo.

== Geography ==
This rural locality is located 41 km from Krasny Chikoy (the district's administrative centre), 426 km from Chita (capital of Zabaykalsky Krai) and 5,068 km from Moscow. Sredny Shergldzhin is the nearest rural locality.
