= Tseezhe-Burgaltaysky datsan =

Tibetan Buddhist monastery in Ust-Burgaltai, Buryatia, Russia

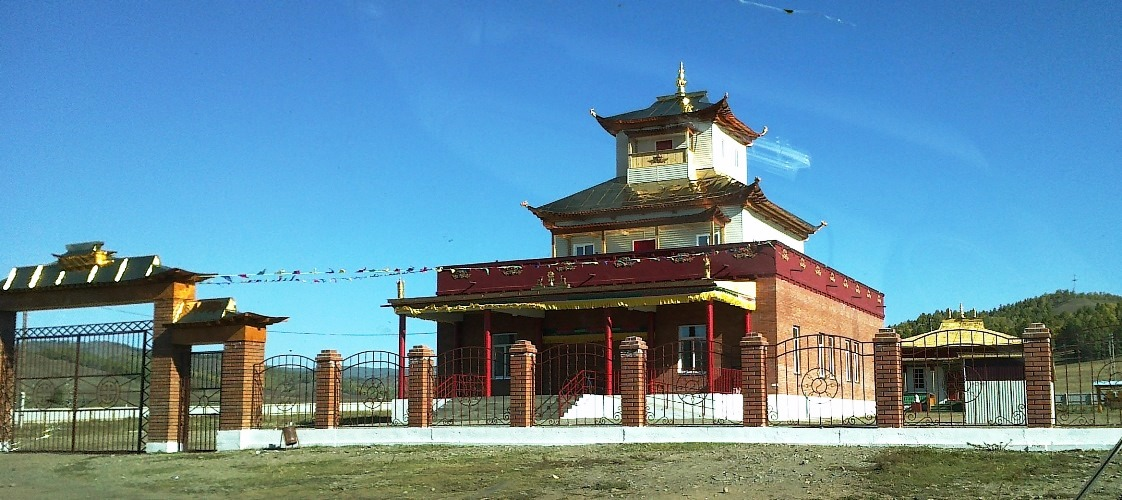
The main temple "Dondup Norbulin" of Tseezhe-Burgaltaysky datsan

Tseezhe-Burgaltaysky datsan (Russian: Цэ́эжэ-Бургалта́йский даца́н) is the Buddhist Temple located in Buryatia, Russia.

Located in the village of Ust-Burgaltai, Zakamensky District.

== History ==
Datsan was founded in 1828. The first building of the datsan was built in 1837. In 1880 it was completed the main temple "Dondup Norbulin". Stone temple had three floors.

Tseezhe-Burgultaysky datsan is a large complex of temple structures, consisting of stone and wooden churches and other buildings.

It was attended by the faithful from all the surrounding district. The Datsan served more than 300 lamas and khuvaraks.

In 1935 the Datsan was destroyed by the Bolsheviks. Lamas was repressed. Most of them perished in Stalin's camps.

== Revival ==
It began the revival Tseezhe-Burgaltaysky datsan in 1991.

On 12 August 1991 it held the first of many years of service. In the same year began the reconstruction of old building Tsogchen dugan, which was inaugurated on 10 August 1992.

Finally, in 2012, the restoration of the main temple of Tseezhe-Burgaltaysky datsan – "Dondup Norbulin". The construction was designed by 1854.

Building was conducted on donations from the faithful. There were collected more than 14 million rubles.

On 6 September 2014 the main temple Tseezhe-Burgaltayskogo datsan was inaugurated.
