= Lake Gusinoye =

Body of fresh water in the Republic of Buryatia, Russia

- Галуута нуур (Mongolian)
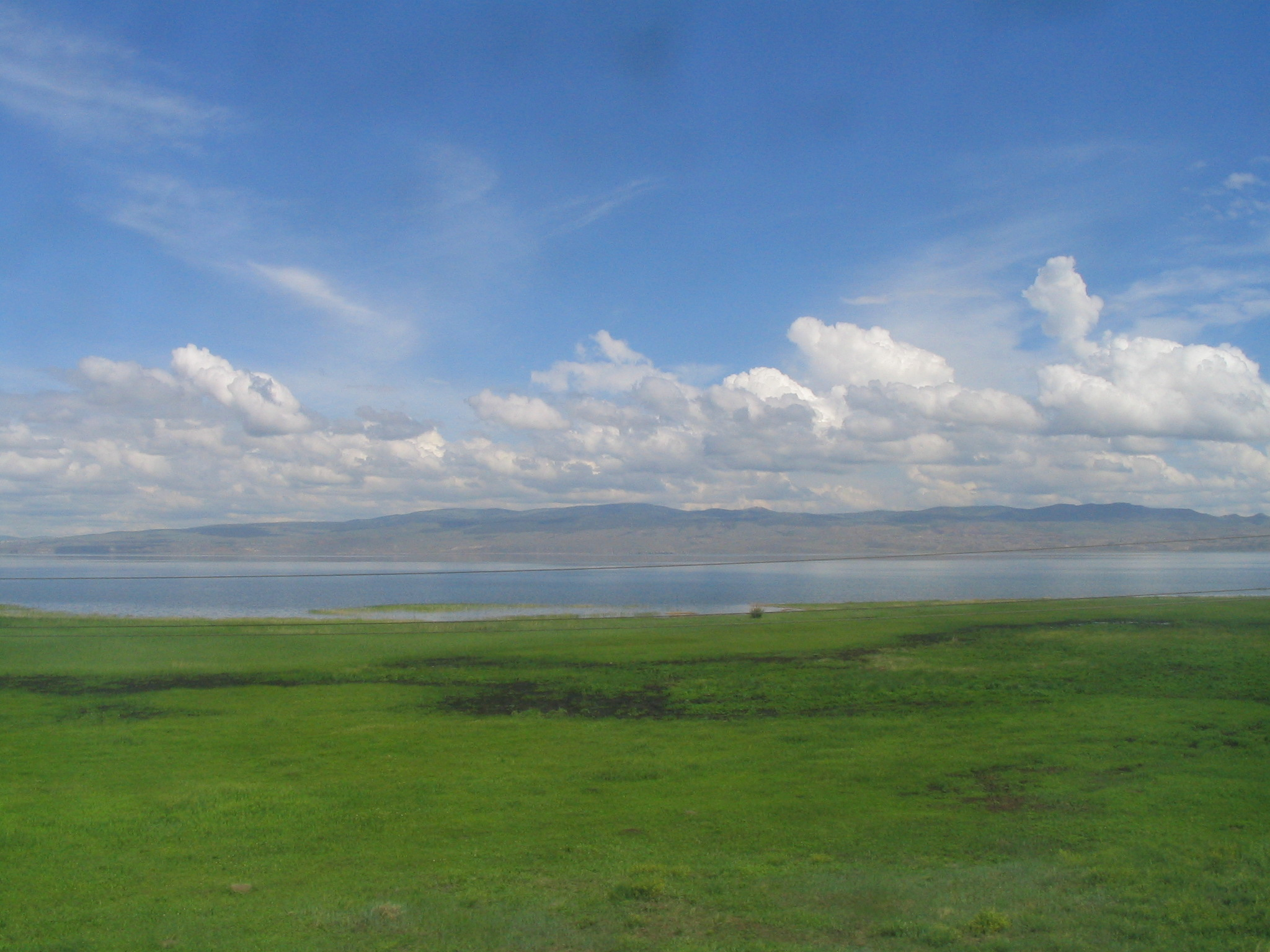

- Location within Republic of Buryatia
- Location: Republic of Buryatia, Russia
- Coordinates: 51°12′N 106°24′E
- Basin countries: Russia

Lake Gusinoye (Russian: Гусиное озеро, Gusinoye ozero; Mongolian: Галуут нуур, Galuut nuur) is the name of a body of fresh water in the Republic of Buryatia, Russia.

== Geography ==
The lake is located in the Gusinoozyor Basin between two ranges of the Selenga Highlands, about120 kilometers (75 mi) southwest of Ulan-Ude, the capital of the republic. It is close to the border with Mongolia. The town of Gusinoozyorsk is located on the northeastern shore of the lake. Tamchinsky datsan, one of the ancient Buddhist monasteries of Russia, is located on the opposite bank, in the village with the same name as the lake, Gusinoye Ozero.

== See also ==
- Lake Baikal
