= Gusinoye Ozero (rural locality) =

Village in Buryat Republic, Russia

Coordinates: 51°7′22″N 106°15′14″E

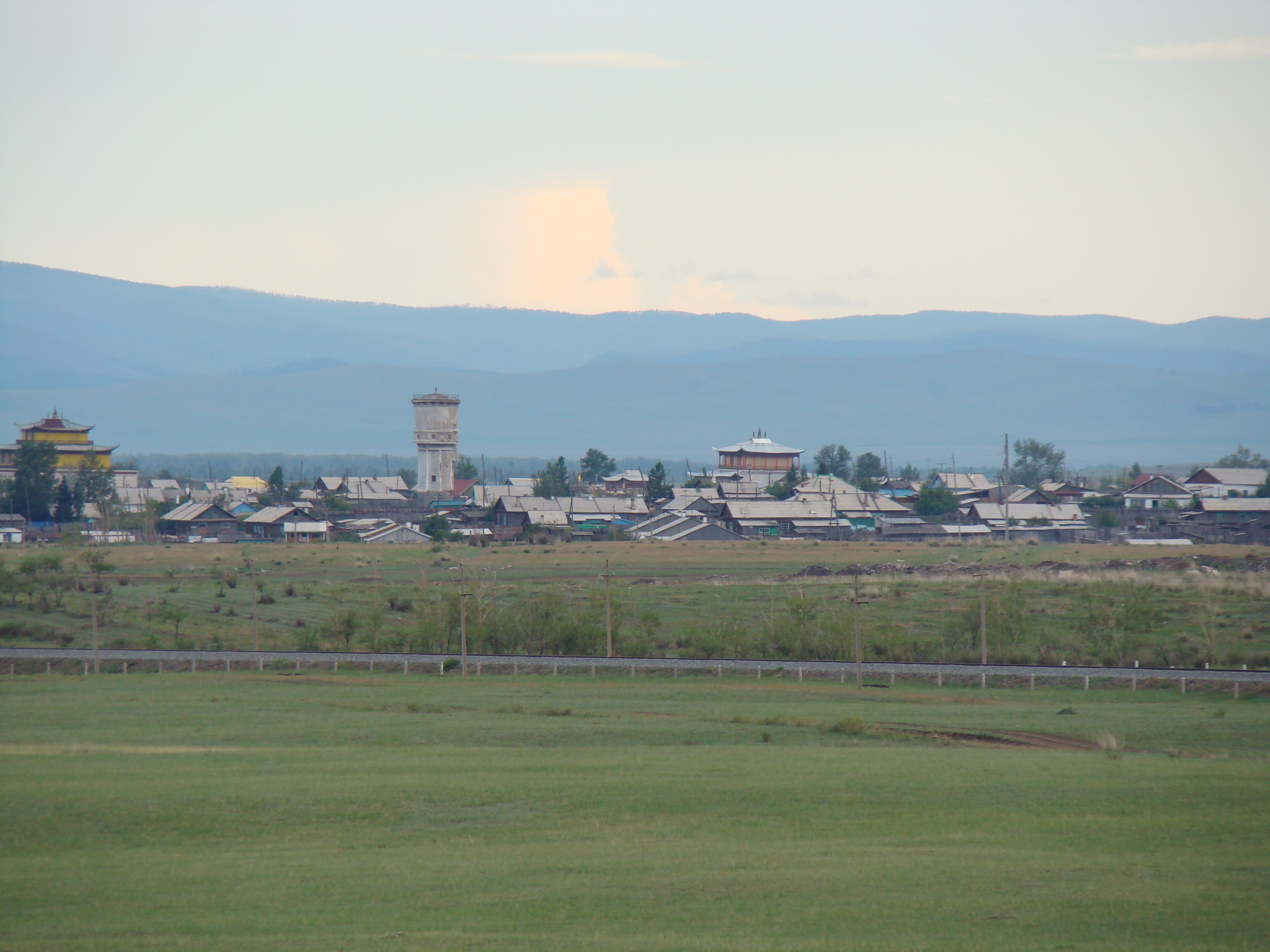
Gusinoye Ozero in 2008

Gusinoye Ozero (Russian: Гуси́ное О́зеро; Buryat: Тамча, Tamcha) is a village (selo) in Selenginsky District of the Buryat Republic, Russia, located on the south-western shore of Lake Gusinoye, Selenga Highlands. Population: 3,268 (2002 census); 4,219 (1989 Soviet census). Gusinoye Ozero is the second most populated inhabited locality of Selenginsky District (after Gusinoozyorsk).

The village was founded in 1934 during the construction of the Ulan-Ude—Naushki railway. It was granted urban-type settlement status on June 26, 1941, but demoted back to rural locality on November 22, 2004, due to closing of all industrial enterprises.

It is home of the Tamchinsky datsan, a Buddhist monastery "founded in the mid-18th century." In 1809, the monastery became "the center of Buddhism in eastern Siberia". The temple, which was ransacked in the 1930s, was being restored as of 2013 "as part of the revival of the Buddhist cultural and spiritual legacy in Buriatiia."
