= Tamchinsky datsan =

Buddhist monastery at Lake Gusinoye, Buryat Republic, Russia

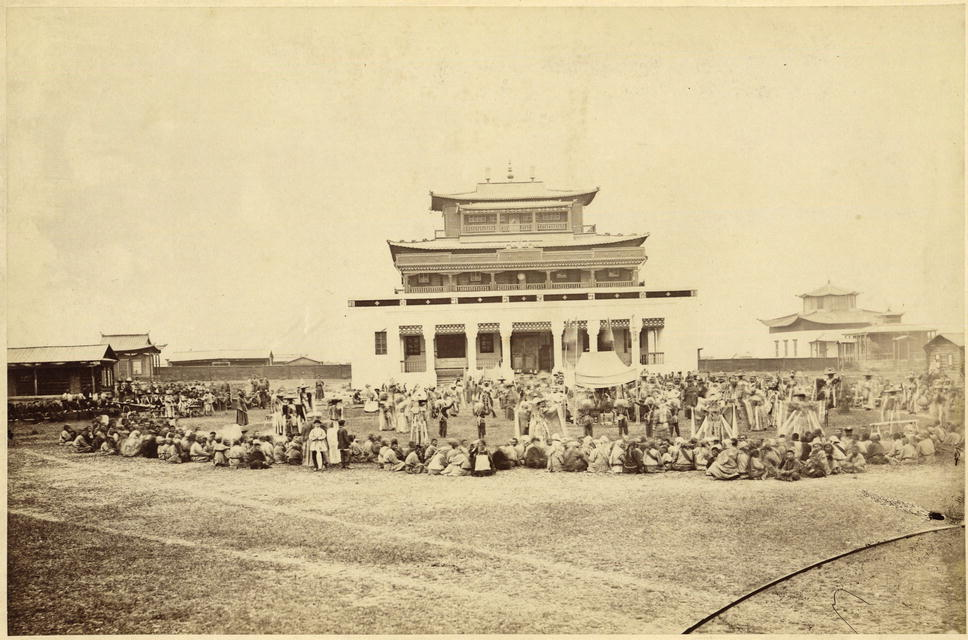
Tamchinsky datsan in the 1890s

The Tamchinsky datsan (Buryat: Тамчын дасан, Tamchyn dasan), also called the Tamchinskii datsan or Gusinoozyorsk Datsan, is a Buddhist monastery founded in the mid-18th century in the village of Gusinoye Ozero, located on the south-western shore of Lake Gusinoye, Buryat Republic, Russia.

In 1809, the monastery became "the center of Buddhism in eastern Siberia". Lama Dashi-Dorzho Itigilov received his medical training here. Ceremonies at the temple were filmed in the Pudovkin's fictional drama Storm Over Asia (1928 film).

The temple, which was ransacked in the 1930s, was being restored as of 2013 "as part of the revival of the Buddhist cultural and spiritual legacy in Buriatiia."

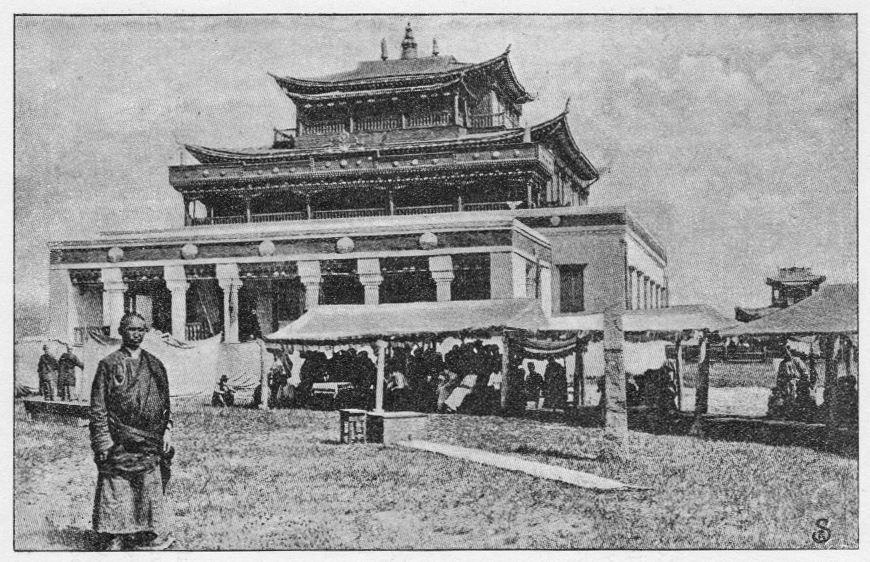
Gusinoozersk datsan around 1920
