= Atsaysky datsan =

Tibetan Buddhist monastery on Goose Lake, Buryatia, Russia

Coordinates: 51°06′N 106°36′E

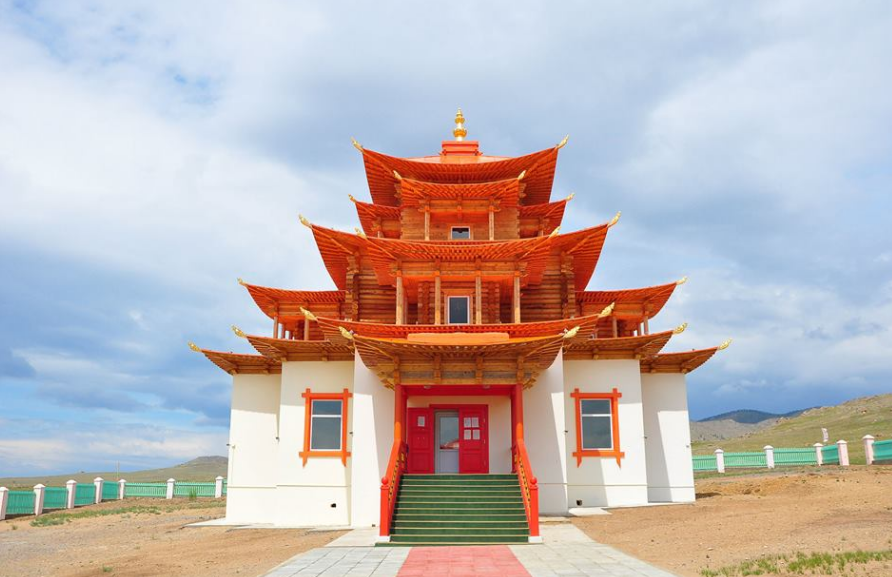
Atsaysky datsan in Buryatia, Selenga area

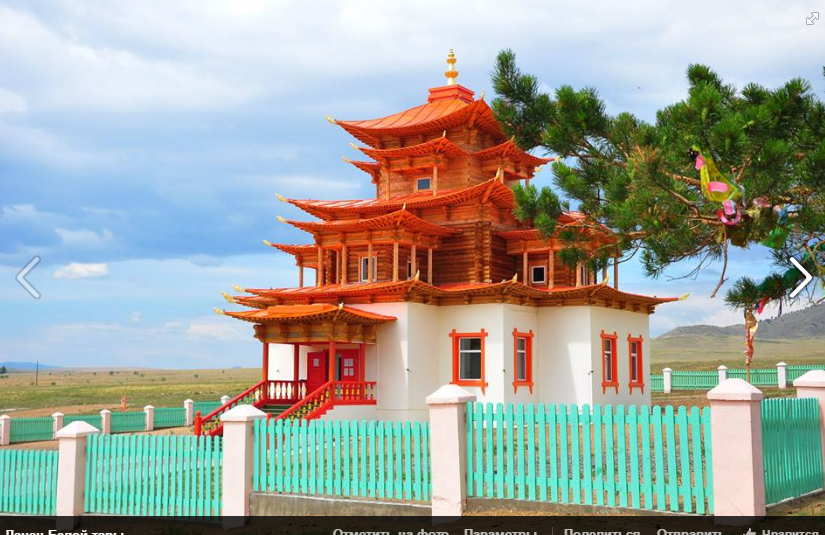
Revived Atsaysky datsan

Atsaysky datsan "Tubden Darzhaling" is one of the oldest Buddhist Gelug monasteries in Buryatia, which operated from 1743 to 1935.

== History ==
In 1743, in the north-east side of Goose Lake, in the mouth of the river Zagustay Selenge Buryats, put the temple arc represent a felt yurt.

The first shireete (superiors) are Lama, who arrived from Tibet.

Later wooden Tsogchen arc was built, with the Tibetan name Tubden Darzhaling.

In the 1930s during the anti-religious persecution lamas were persecuted, and he was eliminated datsan decision.

By 1945, all the buildings of the complex were demolished.

== Revival ==
In 2012-2014, the Palace complex erected White Tara.

The temple-Dugan conducted daily services.
