= Dyrestuy =

Dyrestuy Дырестуй
- Selo
- Location within Republic of Buryatia Location within Russia
- Coordinates: 50°39′N 106°03′E
- Country: Russia
- Region: Republic of Buryatia
- District: Dzhidinsky District
- Time zone: UTC+8:00

Dyrestuy (Russian: Дырестуй; Buryat: Дэрэстэй, Derestei) is a rural locality (a selo) in Dzhidinsky District, Republic of Buryatia, Russia. The population was 1,095 as of 2010. There are 10 streets.

== Geography ==
Dyrestuy is located 58 km east of Petropavlovka (the district's administrative centre) by road. Dzhida is the nearest rural locality.
