= Egita =

Egita Эгита
- Selo
- Location within Republic of Buryatia Location within Russia
- Coordinates: 52°25′N 110°44′E
- Country: Russia
- Region: Republic of Buryatia
- District: Yeravninsky District
- Time zone: UTC+8:00

Egita (Russian: Эгита; Buryat: Эгитэ, Egite) is a rural locality (a selo) in Yeravninsky District, Republic of Buryatia, Russia. The population was 342 as of 2010. There are 20 streets.

== Geography ==
Egita is located 60 km west of Sosnovo-Ozerskoye (the district's administrative centre) by road. Mozhayka is the nearest rural locality.
