= Murochi =

Murochi Мурочи
- Ulus
- Location within Republic of Buryatia Location within Russia
- Coordinates: 50°21′N 106°55′E
- Country: Russia
- Region: Republic of Buryatia
- District: Kyakhtinsky District
- Time zone: UTC+8:00

Murochi (Russian: Мурочи) is a rural locality (an ulus) in Kyakhtinsky District, Republic of Buryatia, Russia. The population was 339 as of 2010. There are 10 streets.

== Geography ==
Murochi is located 66 km east of Kyakhta (the district's administrative centre) by road. Kurort Kiran is the nearest rural locality.
