= Naryn-Atsagat =

Naryn-Atsagat Нарын-Ацагат
- Selo
- Location within Republic of Buryatia Location within Russia
- Coordinates: 52°00′N 108°17′E
- Country: Russia
- Region: Republic of Buryatia
- District: Zaigrayevsky District
- Time zone: UTC+8:00

Naryn-Atsagat (Russian: Нарын-Ацагат; Buryat: Нарин Асагад, Narin Asagad) is a rural locality (a selo) in Zaigrayevsky District, Republic of Buryatia, Russia. The population was 568 as of 2010. There are 6 streets.

== Geography ==
Naryn-Atsagat is located 28 km north of Zaigrayevo (the district's administrative centre) by road. Pervomayevka is the nearest rural locality.
