= Egituysky datsan =

Tibetan Buddhist monastery in Yeravninsky district, Buryatia, Russia

Coordinates: 52.4374°N 110.7207°E

Egituysky datsan is a Buddhist temple in Buryatia, Russia located in Yeravninsky District.

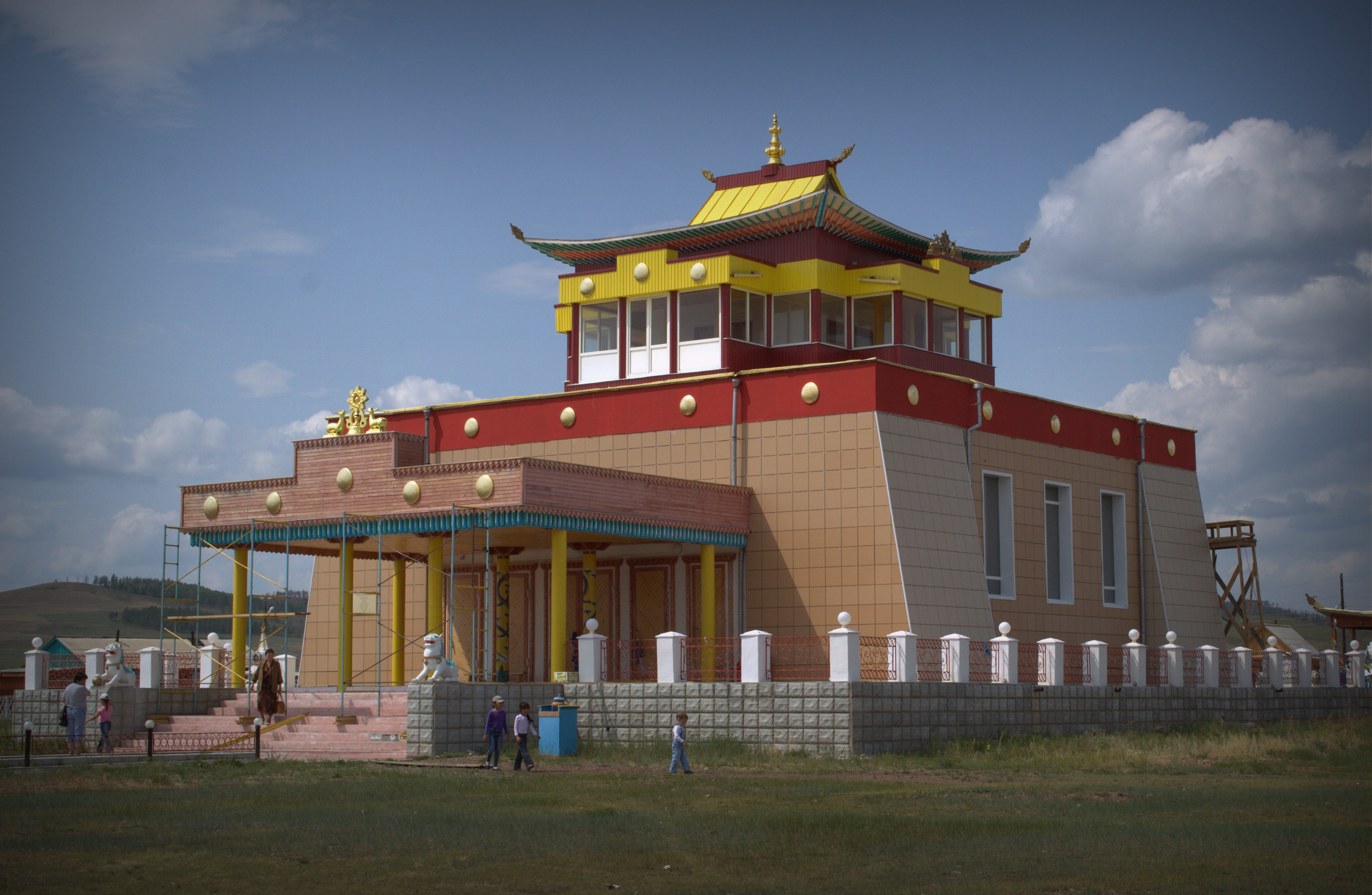
Egituysky datsan

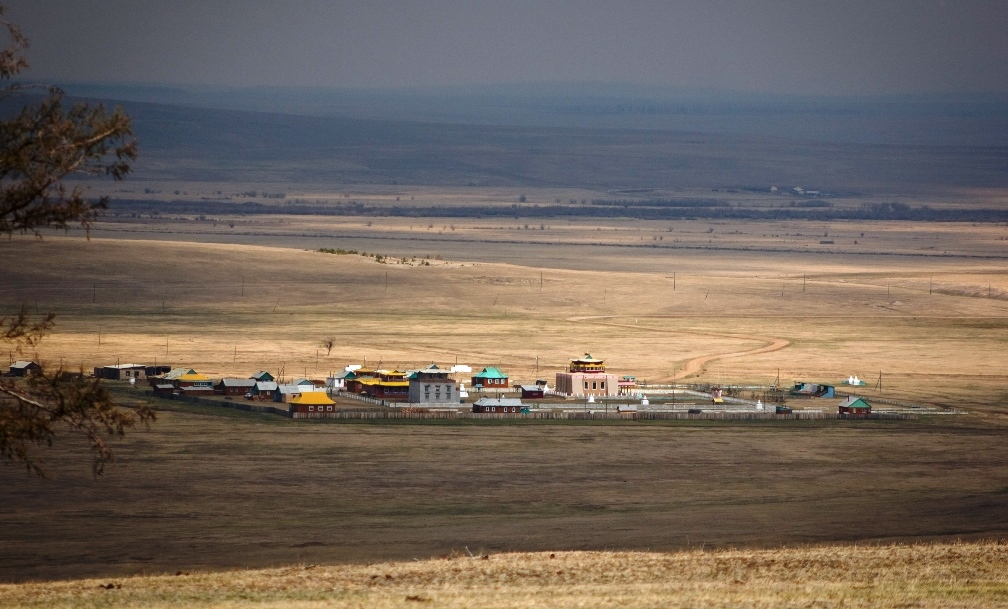
Complex of Egituisky datsan

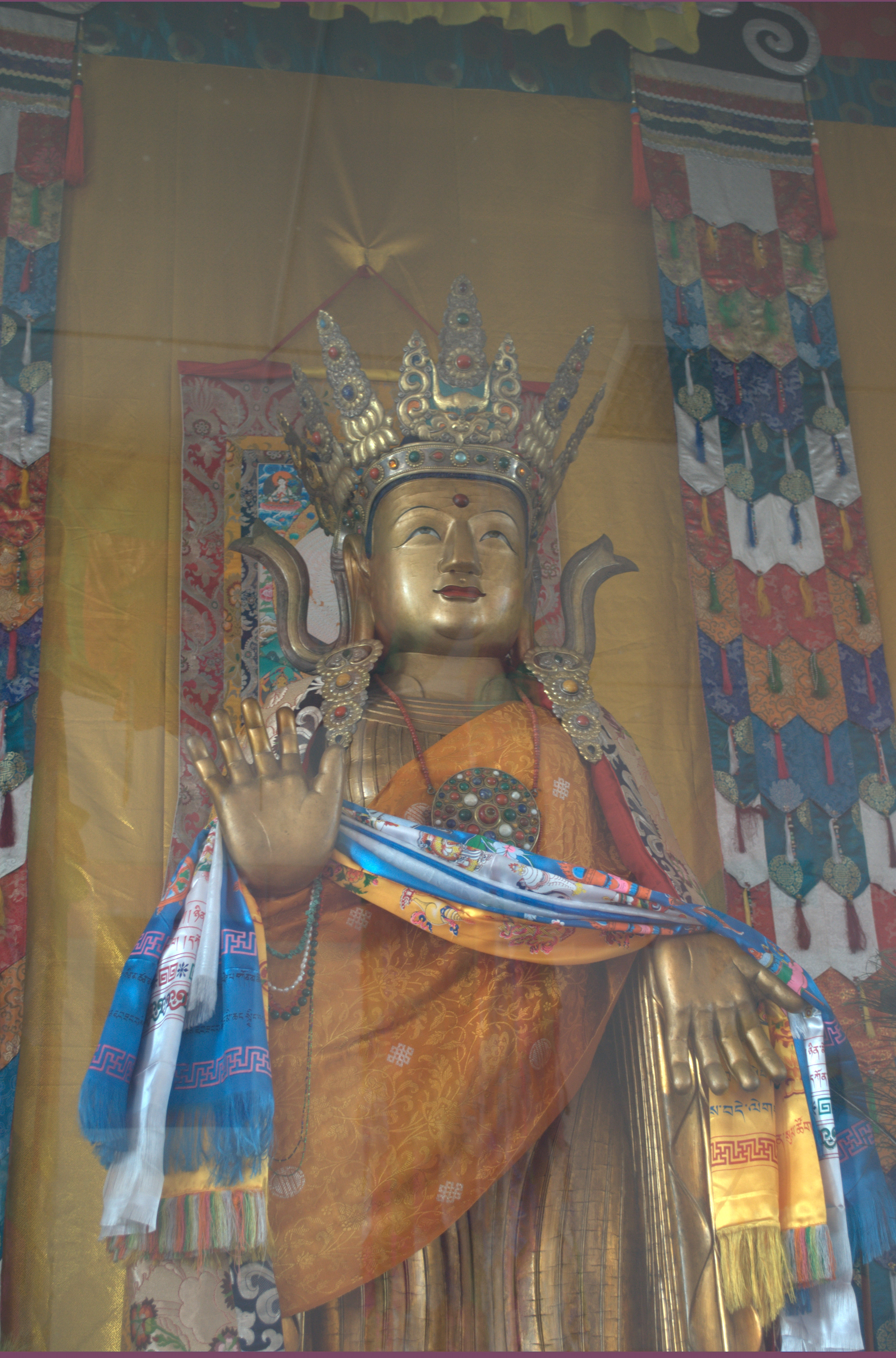
Sandalwood Buddha (Zandan Zhuu)

The datsan houses a sacred relic of Buddhism, Sandalwood Buddha (Zandan Zhuu), which is, according to tradition, the only statue of Śākyamuni Buddha carved during his lifetime.

== History ==
The monastery was founded in 1820.

The architecture of Egituysky datsan was one of the most beautiful. Three Dugan – medical, philosophical and astrological – surrounded by the main temple. When datsan operated printing press.

In 1937 Egituysky datsan was closed and destroyed.

Datsan revived after 1991.

== Sources ==
- Эгитуйский дацан
- Эгитуйский дацан и статуя Зандан Жуу.
- Мы в СМИ
