= Chersky =

Chersky (masculine), Cherskaya (feminine), or Cherskoye (neuter) may refer to:

- Jan Czerski (1845–1892), also known as Ivan Chersky, Polish scientist and explorer
- Chersky (urban-type settlement), a municipal formation and settlement in Nizhnekolymsky District of the Sakha Republic, Russia is incorporated
- Chersky Airport, in the Sakha Republic, Russia
- Chersky, alternative name of the Northeast Science Station, an Arctic research station in Russia
- Chersky Range, a mountain chain in northeastern Siberia
- Chersky Range (Transbaikalia)
- Mount Chersky, the highest peak of the Baikal Mountains
- Chersky Peak, a mountain in Irkutsk Oblast
