= Economy of Buryatia =

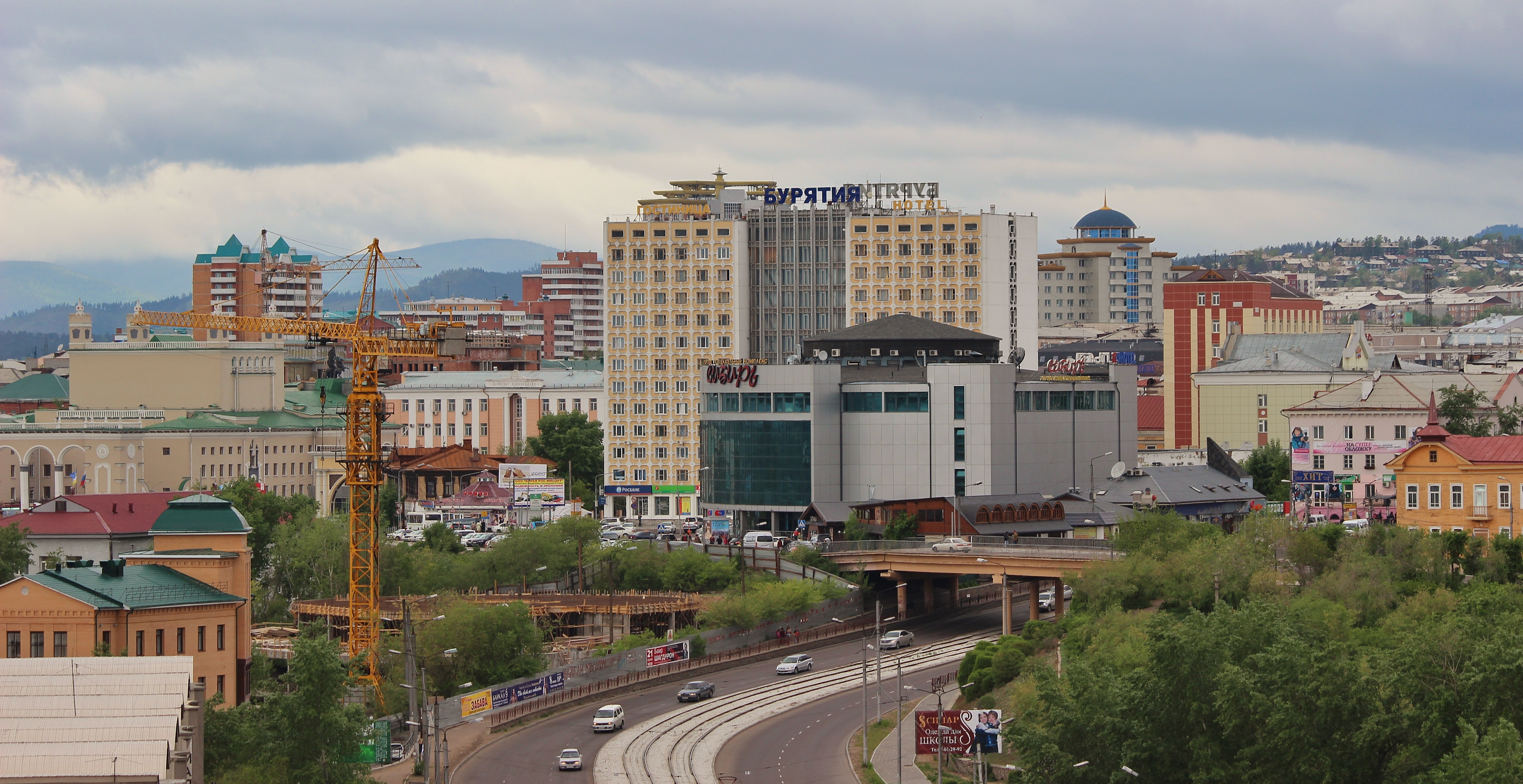
- Currency: Rouble (RBL)

Statistics
- All values, unless otherwise stated, are in US dollars.

The Republic of Buryatia (Russian: Респу́блика Буря́тия) is a federal subject of Russia (a republic) which, according to the IMF, was an emerging economy in 2011.

== Overview ==
Buryatia has a well-developed transport infrastructure of federal importance and boasts an impressive natural resources base. The republic has well-established international and inter-regional relations, high potential for tourism development, and stable political and economic conditions. Historically, the Republic of Buryatia has demonstrated higher growth rate compared to Russia's average. The city of Ulan-Ude is the administrative, economic and cultural center of the republic.

== History ==
=== Early history ===
Until the end of the seventeenth century the Buriats were mainly nomadic cattle breeders. Hunting continued to play a significant role in their economy. In the taiga they hunted large wild animals such as elks or bears. In the steppe it was foxes, wolves, or Siberian marmots. They hunted some animals for meat, some for fur, and others for both meat and fur. They especially valued beaver and otter fur, with which they paid tribute (Russian: ясак, romanized: yasak) to the czar.

=== 20th century ===
After the October Revolution of 1917 in Russia, the process of integration of Zabaykalye and Far East into the structure of Russia was very intensive.

During the Soviet period, developed agriculture was created in the republic. Large enterprises nearly in 60 branches of economy were built including aircraft industry, machine-building, energy power, coal and ore-mining, timber-processing and other kinds of industry connected to all economic regions of the USSR. The major part of factories on the territory of Buryatia belonged to military-industrial complex that caused the certain isolation of Buryatia. Foreign citizens were forbidden from entering Buryatia until the 1980s.

Market reforms in the 1990s privatized much of Russian industry and agriculture, with notable exceptions in the energy and defense-related sectors.

== Economic figures ==
GDP pro person nominal in 2018 was 3,650 USD and PPP in 2009 was 11,148 USD.

According to the Ministry of Economy of the Republic of Buryatia, the economic figures in 2011 were as follows:

	January–November (million rubles)	January–November, 2011 in %
Industrial production index		115,3
Amount of shipped domestic manufactured goods, amount of performed work of foreign-economic activity “Mining operations”	9031,4	114,2
Amount of shipped domestic manufactured goods, amount of performed work of foreign-economic activity “Manufacturing production”	45870,0	139,9
Amount of shipped domestic manufactured goods, amount of performed work of foreign-economic activity “Production and distribution of electric power, gas and water”	17090,0	127,6
Agricultural products	14960,4	100,8
Amount of performed work of foreign-economic activity “Construction”	15511,6	101,5
Input to operation of dwelling houses, thousand square meters	243,4	105,3
Retail trade turnover	87391,0	104,0
Volume of communication services	5649,9	108,9
Amount of freight volume, million ton-km.	37681,0	99,9
Amount of charged services provided to the public	21285,9	105,2
Consumer price index		107,0
Real disposable personal income		100,4
Average salary income (nominal)	19307,6	110,8
Average salary income (real)		101,2
General unemployment rate		7,4%
Registered unemployment rate		1,3%

== Infrastructure ==
The Baikal region which is a bridge between Europe and Asia is located favorably for the development of Trans-Eurasian transport and logistics.

The Trans-Siberian Railway crosses the entirety of Buryatia, connecting the capital Ulan-Ude with Ulaanbaatar, Mongolia and Beijing. The railroad distance from the city of Ulan-Ude to Moscow is 5519 km, and to the Pacific Ocean is 3500 km. In the northern part of Buryatia there is a part of Baikal–Amur Mainline, which is 547 km long. Buryatia has a relatively good traffic net, and is connected by the Baikal International Airport.

Lack of investment in the integrated transport and logistics system has become a major obstacle to the economic growth in the region and its strategic development. According to Bulatov, R.V, the development of the transport infrastructure should be managed through transport and logistics centers, which are the centers of the economic growth in the region. He confirms the position that the integration of the regional transport system into the international transport system will form the Asian macrologistical platform and will provide an opportunity to transform the Republic of Buryatia into an international transport hub. Particular attention has been drawn to the development of the new international transport corridor, Mongolian Vector, aimed at servicing transit cargo flows. Currently, the cooperation within the framework of the railway transit traffic between Russia, Mongolia and China is aimed at creating an investment project to set up the transport and logistics company, ANMET.

== Foreign trade ==
The Republic of Buryatia is located in the center of the Asian continent and serves as a transportation and communication bridge between Russia, Mongolia, China, and other countries of the Asia-Pacific region. The Republic plays an important role of Russia's "transport gate" to the Asia-Pacific region.

Main export articles are round wood, hewn wood, non-bleached paperboard, helicopters, spare parts and accessories, food- and agricultural products.

In 2011, foreign trade turnover of the Republic of Buryatia was US$903.3 million. That year, Buryat businesses had foreign trade transactions with partners from 42 countries.

== Sectors ==
=== Agriculture ===
Agro-industrial complex provides up to 10% of the gross regional product. Agriculture is one of the main and socially significant sectors of the local economy. 95% of the districts are agrarian, and the economy of 67% of districts is agrarian. A major part of the agricultural sector is livestock breeding, with cattle-breeding accounting for almost three-quarters of agricultural production.

Processing industry of the Republic of Buryatia is represented by meat, dairy, fruit and vegetable, animal feeding and milling industries. Food processing industry accounts for 17% of the total output of all industrial production of the republic.

In 2011, the volume of agricultural production was planned to reach 3 billion rubles, with 36,4% labor productivity and 5% profit level. The Baikal region's low pollution level is an important competitive argument on the Chinese market.

In the post-Soviet era, there has been a decrease in domestic production of agricultural products in the republic and an increase of the share of imported goods in it, which in its turn, poses the threat to ensuring of the region's food security. The macroeconomic risks comprise the loss of competitiveness of regional products in the global food market, as well as the high interest rates of bank loans. The technological risks in the area of production are associated with the low level of the technical and technological manufacturing facilities of production. The significant role in ensuring food security of the country and its regions belongs to the foreign trade factors, including the strengthening of the imported products volumes under Russia's WTO accession.

=== Tourism ===
Convenient geographical and geopolitical location, unique nature, rich history and culture make Buryatia attractive for travelers from all over Russia and abroad.

Buryatia's natural resources, national parks and the Lake Baikal are the foundation for tourism development in the Republic. Beaches suitable for recreation purposes occupy about 60% of the coast of the Lake Baikal; scenic mountain ranges offer many sites for mountain tourism, mountaineering and skiing. Lakes and rivers are suitable for developing water tourism, whereas over 300 mineral and thermal water springs and 47 medicinal mud deposits with difference in chemical and balneological properties provide conditions for health recreation.

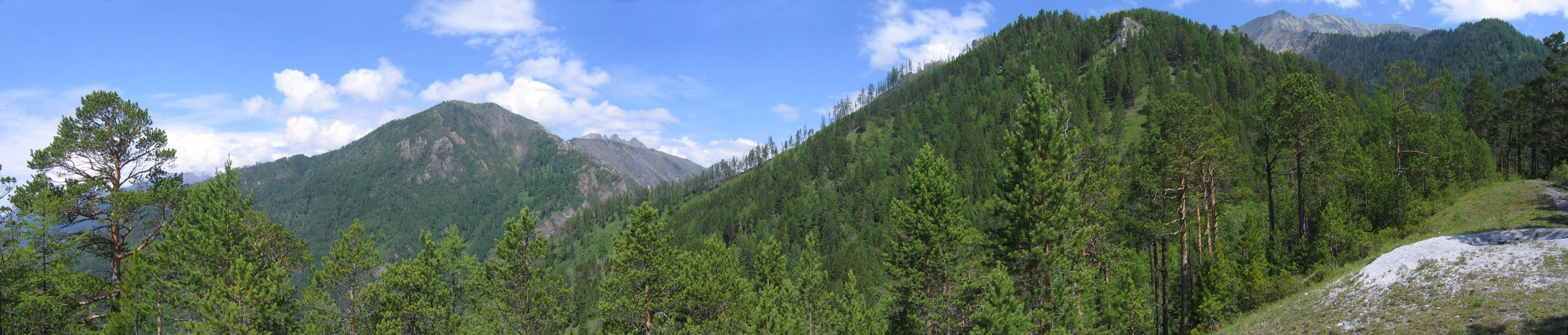
Above the Arshan resort, Tunkinsky, with Sayan Mountains and Lover's Peak

A Special Economic Zone of tourist-recreational type “Baikal harbour” has been established on the coast of the Lake Baikal. The zone incorporates main tourist resources: spurs of Golondinsky mountain ranges, Ulan-Burgas and Primorsky Range, desert valleys, lush pine forests, lakes and mountain rivers, mineral water springs and muds, historical and cultural monuments.

Buryatia is home to two of Russia's national parks. Zabaykalsky National Park covers the middle of the eastern shore of Lake Baikal, with developed ecotourism routes and facilities. To the southwest of the lake, in the Irkut River Valley, is Tunkinsky National Park, drawing tourists with the dramatic scenery of the Sayan Mountains to its west, and the lower Khamar-Daban mountains to the east.

=== Mining ===
Major mining complexes include the Ozyerny mining complex, with extraction capacity of 1 million tons of ore per year.

In 2011, Siberian coal power company started developing the Nikolsky coal deposit. The "Atomredmetzoloto" JSC is working on the Chiagda uranium deposit and Ermakovsky beryllium deposits. In the south of the republic, in Zakamensk district, there is potential to master deposits of tungsten and molybdenum.

Work has been done to prepare deposits of pure quartz and greenstones, Orekitkansk molybdenum deposit in Bauntovsky district, Zharchihinsk molybdenum deposit in Tarbagataysky district, Nazarovsk gold sulfite deposit in Eravninsky district, Oshurkovsky deposit of apatite for the development.

== Natural resources ==
Natural resources of Buryatia are unique both by the scale of reserves, and by their diversity. The republic boasts over 700 explored mineral deposits, including 247 deposits of gold, 7 deposits of wolfram, 13 deposits of uranium, four of base metals including two of molybdenum and two of beryllium, one of tin and one of aluminum. The land of Buryatia accumulates 90% of Russia's reserves of nephrite, 48% of zinc, 24% of lead, 32% of molybdenum, 20% of wolfram, 15% of chrysotile asbestos, 13% of apatite, 11% beryllium.

=== Water resources ===
Buryatia's water resources are among the largest in Russia. The territory of Buryatia incorporates a large part of aquatorium of the unique Lake Baikal that accumulates fifth of the world's fresh water reserves. The Lake Baikal and the Baikal nature reserve have a special status of UNESCO natural heritage site. In addition, Buryatia land is rich in mineral water resources: almost every district has mineral springs with various medicinal properties.

There are about 9000 small and large rivers that belong to the Baikal Lake water area and to the drainage basin of Siberia's largest rivers of - the Yenissey and the Lena. The basin of Baikal Lake also includes the largest river of Buryatia, the Selenga and such peculiar rivers as the Barguzin, the Upper Angara, the Snezhnaya (Snowy), the Turka, the Chikoy, the Khilok and others.

=== Forest resources ===
Buryatia is located on the borderline of two different regions: East-Siberian mountainous taiga (4/5 of the territory) and Central-Asian steppe. This is the reason for a great diversity and peculiar character of trees and plants on its territory. Northern slopes of mountain ranges are covered with deciduous forests and thick moss, with cedars and silver firs in some places. Pines and thicket of bushes grow on the southern slopes of mountains. Steppes covered with feather grass rise up to 900-1000m high. The region of forests is above it with the upper line of 1500-1600m to 2000m high. Pines grow in Predbaykalye, on the slopes of Primorskoye and Baikalsky ranges. Deciduous forests grow mainly in the northern part of Zabaykalye. Cedar forests are concentrated in the highlands. Silver fir is not as widely spread as fir or birch trees.

Notable actors in the forestry industry are the Selenginsk paper pulp-cardboard combine, Baikal wood company, and a processing complex at Taksimo.

== See also ==
- Economy of Russia
