= Dalakhay, Tunkinsky District, Republic of Buryatia =

Dalakhay Далахай
- Ulus
- Location within Republic of Buryatia Location within Russia
- Coordinates: 51°48′N 103°00′E
- Country: Russia
- Region: Republic of Buryatia
- District: Tunkinsky District
- Time zone: UTC+8:00

Dalakhay (Russian: Далахай) is a rural locality (an ulus) in Tunkinsky District, Republic of Buryatia, Russia. The population was 543 as of 2010. There are 12 streets.

== Geography ==
Dalakhay is located 69 km east of Kyren (the district's administrative centre) by road. Tory is the nearest rural locality.
