= Yengorga =

Yengorga Енгорга
- Ulus
- Location within Republic of Buryatia Location within Russia
- Coordinates: 51°46′N 102°06′E
- Country: Russia
- Region: Republic of Buryatia
- District: Tunkinsky District
- Time zone: UTC+8:00

Yengorga (Russian: Енгорга) is a rural locality (an ulus) in Tunkinsky District, Republic of Buryatia, Russia. The population was 21 as of 2010. There is 1 street.

== Geography ==
Yengorga is located 73 km north of Kyren (the district's administrative centre) by road.
