= Nugan =

Nugan Нуган
- Ulus
- Location within Republic of Buryatia Location within Russia
- Coordinates: 51°41′N 102°11′E
- Country: Russia
- Region: Republic of Buryatia
- District: Tunkinsky District
- Time zone: UTC+8:00

Nugan (Russian: Нуган) is a rural locality (an ulus) in Tunkinsky District, Republic of Buryatia, Russia. The population was 244 as of 2010. There are 3 streets.

== Geography ==
Nugan is located 4 km east of Kyren (the district's administrative centre) by road. Kyren is the nearest rural locality.
