= Khoyto-Gol =

Khoyto-Gol Хойто-Гол
- Ulus
- Location within Republic of Buryatia Location within Russia
- Coordinates: 51°42′N 101°31′E
- Country: Russia
- Region: Republic of Buryatia
- District: Tunkinsky District
- Time zone: UTC+8:00

Khoyto-Gol (Russian: Хойто-Гол) is a rural locality (an ulus) in Tunkinsky District, Republic of Buryatia, Russia. The population was 660 as of 2010. There are 29 streets.

== Geography ==
Khoyto-Gol is located 52 km west of Kyren (the district's administrative centre) by road. Turan is the nearest rural locality.
