= Tagarkhay =

Tagarkhay Тагархай
- Selo
- Location within Republic of Buryatia Location within Russia
- Coordinates: 51°52′N 102°23′E
- Country: Russia
- Region: Republic of Buryatia
- District: Tunkinsky District
- Time zone: UTC+8:00

Tagarkhay (Russian: Тагархай; Buryat: Таһархай, Taharkhai) is a rural locality (a selo) in Tunkinsky District, Republic of Buryatia, Russia. The population was 382 as of 2010. There are 5 streets.

== Geography ==
Tagarkhay is located 61 km northeast of Kyren (the district's administrative centre) by road. Arshan is the nearest rural locality.
