= Moygoty =

Moygoty Мойготы
- Selo
- Location within Republic of Buryatia Location within Russia
- Coordinates: 51°38′N 101°23′E
- Country: Russia
- Region: Republic of Buryatia
- District: Tunkinsky District
- Time zone: UTC+8:00

Moygoty (Russian: Мойготы; Buryat: Мойһото, Moihoto) is a rural locality (a selo) in Tunkinsky District, Republic of Buryatia, Russia. The population was 5 as of 2010. There is 1 street.

== Geography ==
Moygoty is located 53 km west of Kyren (the district's administrative centre) by road. Turan is the nearest rural locality.
