= Guzhiry =

Guzhiry Гужиры
- Selo
- Location within Republic of Buryatia Location within Russia
- Coordinates: 51°47′N 102°53′E
- Country: Russia
- Region: Republic of Buryatia
- District: Tunkinsky District
- Time zone: UTC+8:00

Guzhiry (Russian: Гужиры; Buryat: Хужар, Khujar) is a rural locality (a selo) in Tunkinsky District, Republic of Buryatia, Russia. The population was 159 as of 2010. There are 2 streets.

== Geography ==
Guzhiry is located 76 km east of Kyren (the district's administrative centre) by road. Dalakhay is the nearest rural locality.
