= Galbay =

Galbay Галбай
- Selo
- Location within Republic of Buryatia Location within Russia
- Coordinates: 51°47′N 102°32′E
- Country: Russia
- Region: Republic of Buryatia
- District: Tunkinsky District
- Time zone: UTC+8:00

Galbay (Russian: Галбай) is a rural locality (a selo) in Tunkinsky District, Republic of Buryatia, Russia. The population was 462 as of 2010. There are 6 streets.

== Geography ==
Galbay is located 45 km northeast of Kyren (the district's administrative centre) by road. Tabalangut is the nearest rural locality.
