= Tunkinsky National Park =

Mountainous national park Tunkinsky located southwest border if Mongolia

- IUCN category II (national park)
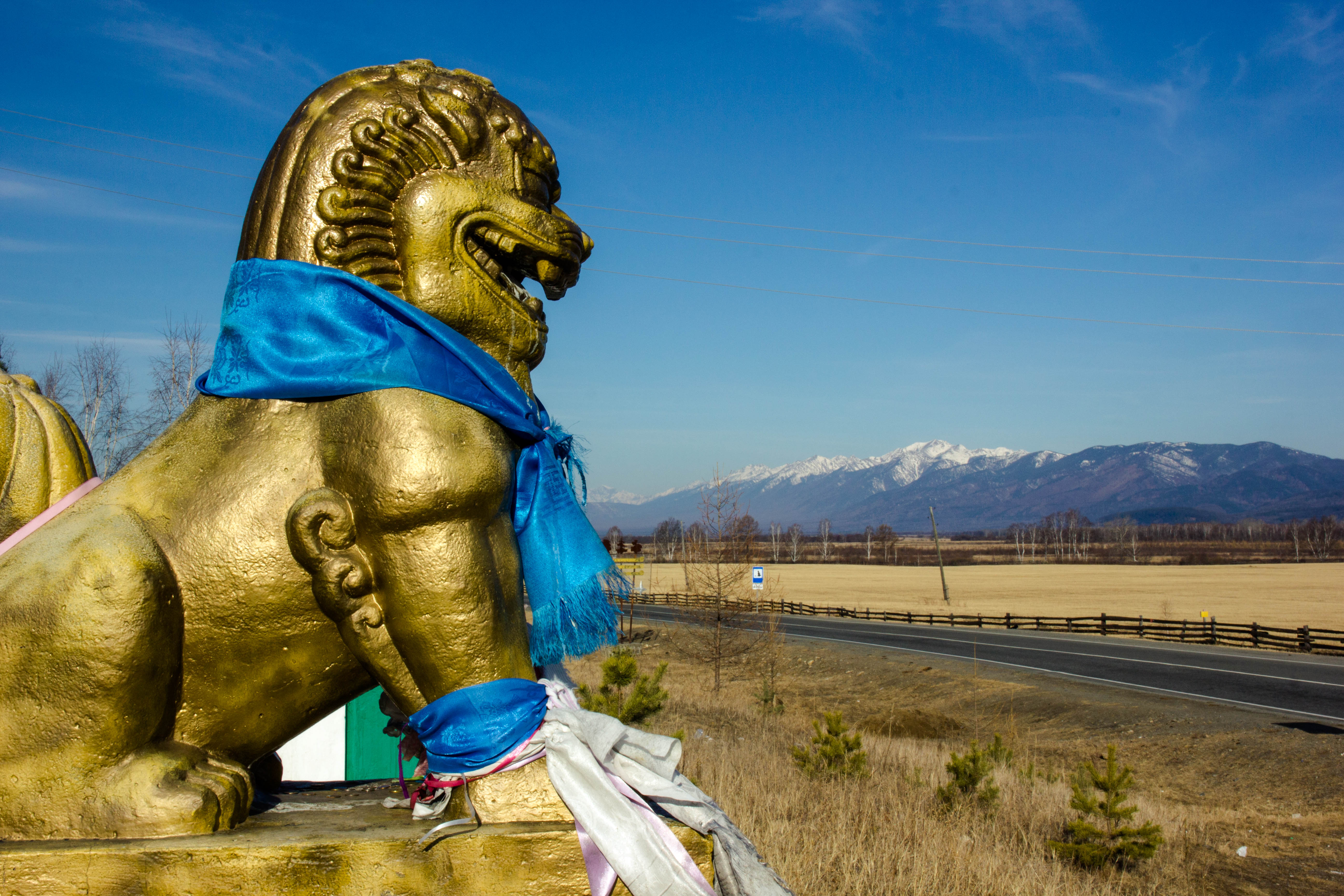

- Location within Russia
- Location: Tunkinsky District of the Republic of Buryatia
- Nearest city: Irkutsk
- Coordinates: 51°41′N 102°08′E
- Area: 1,183,662 hectares (2,924,893 acres; 11,837 km^{2}; 4,570 sq mi)

The Tunka or Tunkinsky National Park (Russian: Тункинский) is a national park located in south central Siberia. It covers a mountainous region centered on the Irkut River valley (also referred to as the Tunka Valley) that continues from the rift valley of Lake Baikal southwest to the border of Mongolia. To the north and west of the valley is the eastern edge of the Sayan Mountains. To the east are the lower Khamar-Daban mountains. About 1,183,662 hectares (2,924,893 acres; 11,837 km^{2}; 4,570 sq mi) in size, the park occupies the entirety of the Tunkinsky District of the Republic of Buryatia.

== Topography ==
The "Tunka Alps" lie about 200 km southwest of the city of Irkutsk. The park features some dramatic scenery of rift and glacial valleys and mountains, hot springs, mountain meadows, waterfalls, and many associated habitats. The park is found at a meeting point of taiga, steppe, alpine forest and lake ecosystems. Tunkinsky, and the Tunka Valley it encompasses, lies between the two great lakes of Siberia - Lake Baikal and Lake Khövsgöl. Heights of the mountains range from 668 metres (2,192 ft) to 3,172 metres (10,407 ft). The central valley of the Irkut is flat with fertile soil well suited to agriculture. There are a number of small settlements in the valley, mostly inhabited by the indigenous Siberian Buryat people.

The park's borders are coterminous with those of Tunkinsky District

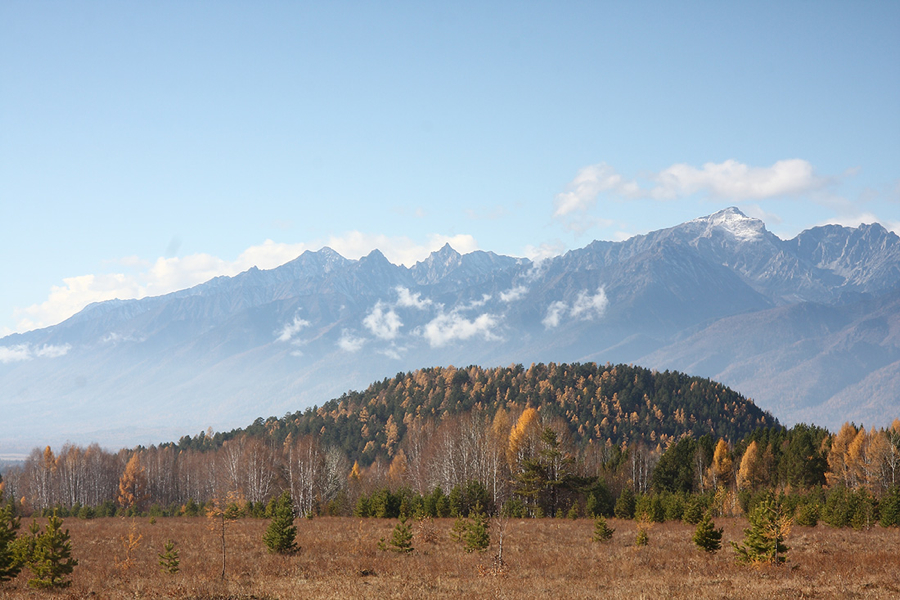
An extinct volcano (Talskaya)

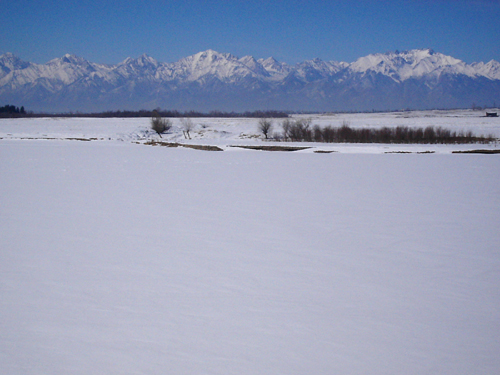
The Irkut River, with Eastern Sayan Mountains in the background

== Climate ==
The climate is continental (Koeppen Classification Dwc Subarctic climate: Snow climate with dry winter, cool summer and cold winter). 595 mm of precipitation per year (maximum in summer).

== Animals ==
As a bio-diverse and isolated park, Tunkinsky is home to a wide variety of animals: over 305 vertebrates have been identified, of which 62 have been characterized as rare or endangered. The endangered species include the snow leopard (with confirmed presence at the northern edge of its range), and the Asiatic wild dog (dhole, or Cuon alpinus) also at the northern edge of its range. Park researchers have identified 54 species of mammals (including Siberian roe deer, wolverine, elk, and the steppe polecat), 18 species of fish (mostly grayling, carp, dace and roach), 207 nesting species of birds and another 30 transitory, 4 species of amphibians and 5 of reptiles.

== Plants ==
The ecoregion of the mid-elevations of the mountains above the valley are Sayan montane conifer forests (often called taiga forests), of the Temperate Conifer Forest biome. These are transitional zone forests, containing species from both the Siberian Taiga and the Mongolian Steppe, primarily pine, cedar and larch. The lower regions are characterized by forest-steppe vegetation. The higher elevations include tundra and alpine glades. Over 900 vascular plants have been recorded, and there are 43 endemic species of plants listed in the Russian Red Book as endangered.

== Tourism ==
The small spa resort town of Arshan lies at the base of the Sayan Mountains, and is known for its carbonate mineral springs. There is developed infrastructure in the town including hotels, baths, and cafes. The area is well known for backpacking, kayaking, mountaineering and rock climbing.

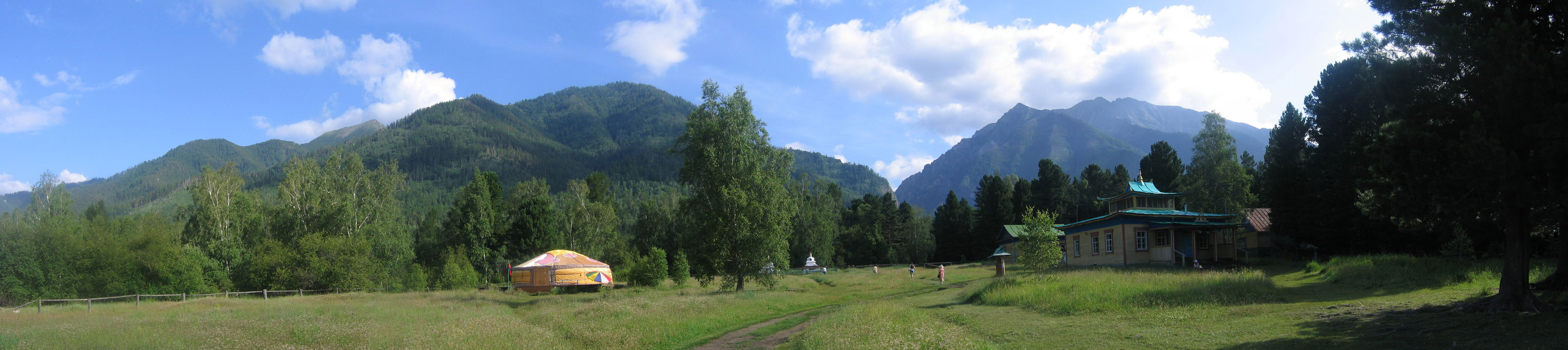
Boddhidharma Datsan near Arshan.
