= Tabalangut =

Tabalangut Табалангут
- Ulus
- Location within Republic of Buryatia Location within Russia
- Coordinates: 51°47′N 102°29′E
- Country: Russia
- Region: Republic of Buryatia
- District: Tunkinsky District
- Time zone: UTC+8:00

Tabalangut (Russian: Табалангут; Buryat: Табангууд, Tabanguud) is a rural locality (an ulus) in Tunkinsky District, Republic of Buryatia, Russia. The population was 80 as of 2010. There are 3 streets.

== Geography ==
Tabalangut is located 48 km northeast of Kyren (the district's administrative centre) by road. Galbay is the nearest rural locality.
