= Shimki =

Shimki Шимки
- Selo
- Location within Republic of Buryatia Location within Russia
- Coordinates: 51°40′N 102°00′E
- Country: Russia
- Region: Republic of Buryatia
- District: Tunkinsky District
- Time zone: UTC+8:00

Shimki (Russian: Шимки; Buryat: Шэмхэ, Shemkhe) is a rural locality (a selo) in Tunkinsky District, Republic of Buryatia, Russia. The population was 512 as of 2010. There are 10 streets.

== Geography ==
Shimki is located 9 km west of Kyren (the district's administrative centre) by road. Khuzhiry is the nearest rural locality.
