= Tory, Republic of Buryatia =

Tory Торы
- Selo
- Location within Republic of Buryatia Location within Russia
- Coordinates: 51°47′N 103°01′E
- Country: Russia
- Region: Republic of Buryatia
- District: Tunkinsky District
- Time zone: UTC+8:00

Tory (Russian: Торы; Buryat: Тоор, Toor) is a rural locality (a selo) in Tunkinsky District, Republic of Buryatia, Russia. The population was 876 as of 2010. There are 18 streets.

== Geography ==
Tory is located 67 km east of Kyren (the district's administrative centre) by road. Dalakhay is the nearest rural locality.
