= Tunka =

Tunka may refer to:

== People ==
- Tunka Manin (1010–1078), ruler of the Ghana Empire
- Ondřej Tunka (born 1990), Czech canoeist

== Places ==
- Tunka, Republic of Buryatia, Russia, a village
- Tunka Range, a mountain in Buryatia, Russia
- Tunka (river), a tributary of the Irkut River of Buryatia, Russia

== Other uses ==
- Tunka experiment, in physics

== See also ==
- Tunka Suka, a mountain in Peru
- Tunka Tunka, a 2021 Punjabi-language drama film
- Tunca (disambiguation)
