= Akhalik =

Akhalik Ахалик
- Selo
- Location within Republic of Buryatia Location within Russia
- Coordinates: 51°47′N 102°40′E
- Country: Russia
- Region: Republic of Buryatia
- District: Tunkinsky District
- Time zone: UTC+8:00

Akhalik (Russian: Ахалик; Buryat: Аһалиг, Ahalig) is a rural locality (a selo) in Tunkinsky District, Republic of Buryatia, Russia. The population was 305 as of 2010. There are 2 streets.

== Geography ==
Akhalik is located 49 km northeast of Kyren (the district's administrative centre) by road. Yelovka is the nearest rural locality.
