= Tunkin Depression =

Valley in Republic of Buryatia, Russia

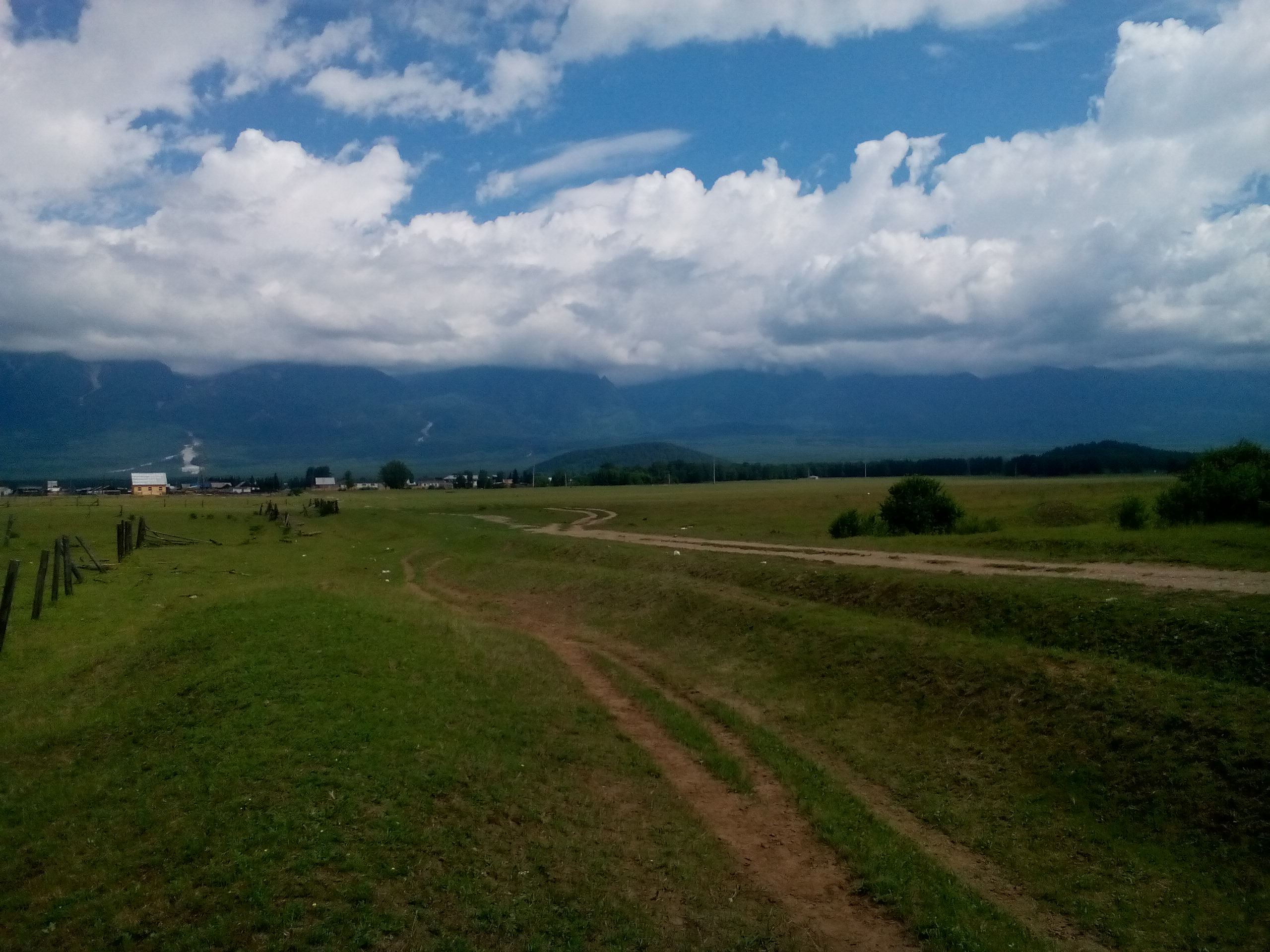
View of the Chersky volcano

Tunkin Depression is a volcanic field in Russia.

The Tunkin Depression itself is a 200 kilometres (120 mi) tectonic depression, part of the Baikal Rift Zone, between Lake Baikal and Khövsgöl Nuur. The depression consists of a number of basins and is covered by alluvial sediments of the Irkut River. The basin is bordered by the Tunka Range to the north and by the Khamar-Daban mountains to the south. The history of the Baikal Rift begins in the Mesozoic, when intracontinental extension took place at the rift. In the Cenozoic, rifting proper commenced generating basins that were filled by sediments and basaltic volcanism. The causes of the rifting are unclear and may involve either tectonic effects of the India-Asia collision, mantle plumes and asthenospheric processes.

The volcanic field consists of numerous cinder cones and lava flows west of the western tip of Lake Baikal. The largest number of individual volcanoes is found close to the town of Tunka and is named the Khobok group. The highest of these volcanoes is Khara-Boldok or Ulyborskiy, which is 125–120 metres (410–394 ft) high. This cone further features a 90–85 metres (295–279 ft) wide crater. Four other groups of volcanoes are found in the Tunkin Depression.

The Tunkin volcanic field has filled the Tunkin Depression with about 500 metres (1,600 ft) of volcanic products, which range from Miocene to Quaternary and include basaltic lava flows and tuffs. Subsidence is still occurring, and the volcanic cones are consequently lowering; one of the cones now rises only about 6 metres (20 ft) above terrain.

The field has produced basalt, which in this field contains carbonatite, olivine or palagonite. The basalts range from alkali basalts to tholeiites. Volcanism may have protracted through the Pleistocene and Holocene; potassium-argon dating of some cones has yielded several ages, including 1.58 ± 0.14 million years ago and 700,000 ± 400,000 years before present.
