= Jan Czerski =

Polish paleontologist, osteologist, geologist, geographer and explorer

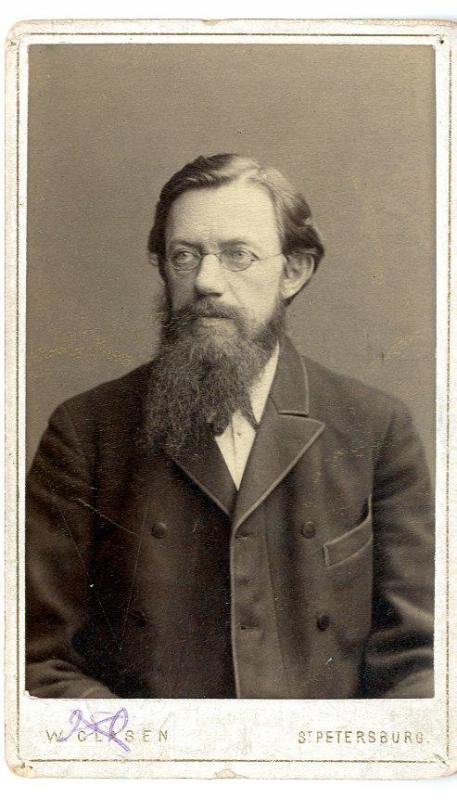
- Czerski, 1879
- Born: 15 May [O.S. 3 May] 1845; Swolna, Vitebsk Governorate, Russian Empire
- Died: 25 June [O.S. 13 June] 1892 (aged 47) near Omolon, Kolyma, Yakutsk Oblast, Russian Empire
- Known for: paleontologist, osteologist, geologist, geographer and explorer of Siberia. The mountain range of the same name is named after Czerski.
- Spouse: Mavra Pavlovna Cherskaya
- Awards: Large and Small gold, Silver medals of the Imperial Russian Geographical Society

Signature
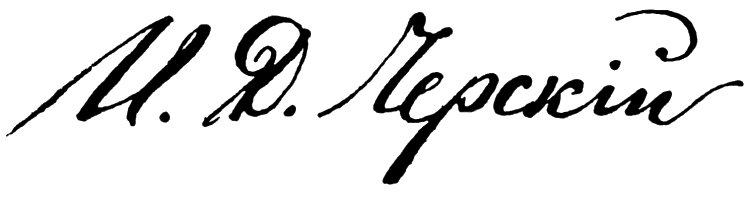

Jan Stanisław Franciszek Czerski, also known as Ivan Dementievich Chersky (Russian: Иван Дементьевич Черский) or Yan Dominikovich Chersky (Russian: Ян Доминикович Черский; 15 May [O.S. 3 May] 1845 – 7 July [O.S. 25 June] 1892), was a Polish, Belarusian, and Russian paleontologist, osteologist, geologist, geographer and explorer of Siberia.

He was exiled to Transbaikalia for participating in the January Uprising of 1863. A self-taught scientist, he eventually received three gold medals from the Russian Geographical Society, and his name was given to a settlement, two mountain ranges, several peaks and other sites. He authored the first map of Lake Baikal.

== Biography ==
Son of Xenia and Dominik Czerski, members of the Lithuanian-Polish nobility, he was born in Vitebsk Governorate, Russian Empire (now Belarus). At the age of 18, as a high-school student of the Institute for Nobles in Vilnius, he took part in the January Uprising (1863–1864). He was captured and taken prisoner on 28 April 1863, and then stripped of his noble status, his lands confiscated and repossessed by another family member loyal to the Russian government. Czerski was then forcibly conscripted into the Russian Army and sentenced to be exiled to Siberia in Blagoveshchensk near the Amur River. He never made it to Blagoveshchensk, but was detached instead to serve in a formation near Omsk. During this time he was befriended by several fellow Polishmen living in exile in the Omsk region, including: Marczewski and Kwiatkowski, as well as a Russian geographer, Grigory Nikolayevich Potanin. Under their influence, he became interested in the natural history of the region. They provided him with literature on Siberia and the natural sciences, so that during his free time he was able to educate himself and carry out his first research.

After release from the army in 1869, he was not given permission to return home, and became a political exile. He was refused entry to university; his publications and his first attempt to join the Russian Geographical Society were also rejected. For the next two years he was forced to work as a teacher in Omsk, having been denied the right to leave the area.

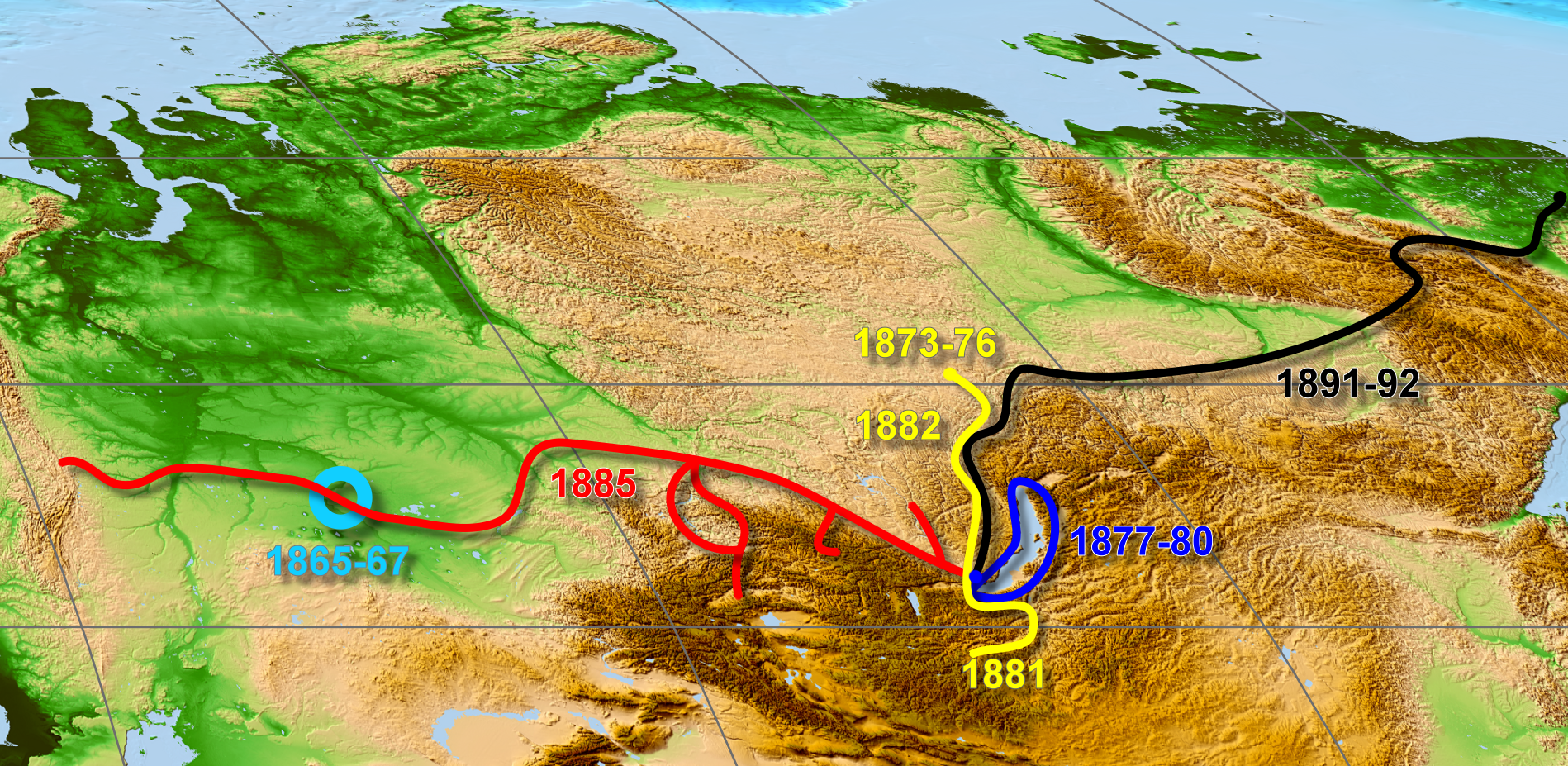
Czerski expeditions in Siberia

In 1871 he received permission to move to Irkutsk where he met other Polish exiles, turned scholars, Aleksander Czekanowski and Benedykt Dybowski. With their help, Czekanowski is considered his mentor, he was able to join the Russian Geographical Society. He secured a job at a local museum and took part in several expeditions, gaining both experience and prominence. He took part in expeditions to the Sayan Mountains, Irkut River Valley and the Lower Tunguska River. During four expeditions (1877–1881) Czerski explored the valley of the Selenga river and published a study on Lake Baikal, explaining the origin of the lake and presenting the geological structure of East Siberia. Perhaps the most notable of these expeditions was to study of the geological structure of the coast of Lake Baikal. The result was the first geological map of that coast, for which Czerski was awarded a gold medal by the Russian Academy of Sciences. He received three medals in total during his career. He received an international award from the University of Bologna, Italy. Czerski later put forward the idea for the development of topographic reliefs (1878) and produced one of the first analyses of the tectonics of central Asia (1886) and pioneered geomorphological evolution theory.

In 1878 he married Marfa Pavlovna Ivanova, a native of Siberia. In 1883 he was pardoned by the Russian government, and later regained his nobility status. He lived in Irkutsk until 1886, working in the east-Siberian section of the Russian Geographical Society. In 1886, he fell ill with progressive tuberculosis and partial paralysis. He was allowed to move to Saint Petersburg, where he joined the St Petersburg Science Academy. Despite his failing health he took time during his travel from Irkutsk to Petersburg to carefully document the geological details along the way. During this period he was appointed head of an expedition to explore the Yana, Indigirka and Kolyma river basins. He collected and catalogued over 2,500 ancient bones, publishing a large work on Quaternary Period mammals in 1888, followed by an even larger work on Siberian mammal fossils in 1891.

He died on 25 June 1892 during an expedition to the Kolyma, Yana and Indigirka Rivers. He was buried near the Omolon River.

== Named after Czerski ==
Several landmarks in Siberia were named in his honour, including:

- the Chersky Range in the East Siberian Mountains
- the Chersky (settlement) in the Sakha Republic
- the Chersky Range in Chita Oblast
- the Chersky Mountain - highest peak (2572 m) of the Baikal Range
- the Chersky Peak (2090 m) - one of the highest peaks of the Khamar-Daban Range
- the Chersky Pass in the same mountains
- the Chersky Stone (728 m) - a peak nearby in Listvyanka
- the Chersky Valley and Chersky Plateau in the Sayan Mountains
- a waterfall near the Baikal Lake,
- an inactive volcano in the Tunkinsk Valley
- Chersky's Place - an archeological site near Irkutsk where ancient human remains were discovered

In 2016, after being acquired by Gazprom, the pipe-layer "Jascon 18" was renamed "Akademik Cherskiy".

Three species of animal fossils were named after him: Osteolepis tscherskii (fish), Leperditia czerskii (crustacean) and Polyptchites tscherskii](ammonite) as well as numerous extant species, including cyprinid fish Sarcocheilichthys czerskii, sculpin Cottus czerskii, char Salvelinus czerskii, Baikal endemic amphipod Eulimnogammarus czerskii and bumblebee Bombus czerskii. The Irkutsk-based Jan Czerski Belarusian Culture Society, an organization of the Belarusian minority in Russia is named after Jan Czerski. A street in Vilnius, Lithuania, is named after Jan Czerski, Jonas Čerskis.

== Works ==
The full list of Czerski's works contains 97 positions. Over a hundred published works have been dedicated to him.

- "Otczot o gieołogiczeskom issledowanii bieriegowoj połosy oziera Bajkała" (1886)
- "Gieołogiczeskije issledowanije Sibirskogo pocztowogo trakta ot oziera Bajkała do wostocznogo chriebta Uralskogo" (1888)
- "Dziennik podróży A. Czekanowskiego" (Czekanowski's Travel Journal)
- His major work in 1891

== See also ==
- Bronisław Piłsudski
