= Nilovka =

Nilovka Ниловка
- Settlement
- Location within Republic of Buryatia Location within Russia
- Coordinates: 51°41′N 101°40′E
- Country: Russia
- Region: Republic of Buryatia
- District: Tunkinsky District
- Time zone: UTC+8:00

Nilovka (Russian: Ниловка) is a rural locality (a settlement) in Tunkinsky District, Republic of Buryatia, Russia. The population was 182 as of 2010. There is 1 street.

== Geography ==
Nilovka is located 39 km west of Kyren (the district's administrative centre) by road. Turan is the nearest rural locality.
