= Okhor-Shibir =

Okhor-Shibir Охор-Шибирь
- Ulus
- Location within Republic of Buryatia Location within Russia
- Coordinates: 51°40′N 102°25′E
- Country: Russia
- Region: Republic of Buryatia
- District: Tunkinsky District
- Time zone: UTC+8:00

Okhor-Shibir (Russian: Охор-Шибирь; Buryat: Охор Шэбэр, Okhor Sheber) is a rural locality (an ulus) in Tunkinsky District, Republic of Buryatia, Russia. The population was 547 as of 2010. There are 5 streets.

== Geography ==
Okhor-Shibir is located 24 km east of Kyren (the district's administrative centre) by road. Zhemchug is the nearest rural locality.
