= Maly Zhemchug =

Maly Zhemchug Малый Жемчуг
- Settlement
- Location within Republic of Buryatia Location within Russia
- Coordinates: 51°41′N 102°21′E
- Country: Russia
- Region: Republic of Buryatia
- District: Tunkinsky District
- Time zone: UTC+8:00

Maly Zhemchug (Russian: Малый Жемчуг) is a rural locality (a settlement) in Tunkinsky District, Republic of Buryatia, Russia. The population was 55 as of 2010. There is 1 street.

== Geography ==
Maly Zhemchug is located 17 km east of Kyren (the district's administrative centre) by road. Okhor-Shibir is the nearest rural locality.
