= Irkut =

Irkut may refer to:

- Irkut (river), a tributary of the Angara in Russia
- Irkut Corporation, a Russian former aircraft manufacturer
