= Nebria catenulata =

Scientific classification
- Domain: Eukaryota
- Kingdom: Animalia
- Phylum: Arthropoda
- Class: Insecta
- Order: Coleoptera
- Suborder: Adephaga
- Family: Carabidae
- Genus: Nebria
- Species: N. catenulata

Binomial name
- Nebria catenulata Fischer von Waldheim, 1820

Species of beetle

Nebria catenulata is a species of metallic green coloured ground beetle from Nebriinae subfamily that can be found in North Korea and Russia.

== Distribution ==
The species is 12 millimetres (0.47 in) long, and lives in Buriatia, Amur, Irkutsk, and Khamar-Daban, all which are located in Russia.
