= Nebria sajanica =

Scientific classification
- Domain: Eukaryota
- Kingdom: Animalia
- Phylum: Arthropoda
- Class: Insecta
- Order: Coleoptera
- Suborder: Adephaga
- Family: Carabidae
- Genus: Nebria
- Species: N. sajanica

Binomial name
- Nebria sajanica Banninger, 1932

Synonyms
- Nebria dabanensis Shilenkov, 1982

Species of beetle

Nebria sajanica is a species of ground beetle in the Nebriinae subfamily that can be found in Buryat Republic and Eastern Sayans. The name comes from the Sayan region where it lives. The species is common in Eastern Siberia and Tunkinsky District of Turan.
