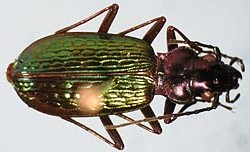

Scientific classification
- Domain: Eukaryota
- Kingdom: Animalia
- Phylum: Arthropoda
- Class: Insecta
- Order: Coleoptera
- Suborder: Adephaga
- Family: Carabidae
- Genus: Nebria
- Species: N. fulgida

Binomial name
- Nebria fulgida Gebler, 1847

= Nebria fulgida =

Species of beetle

Nebria fulgida is a species of ground beetle in the Nebriinae subfamily that can be found in Russian autonomous republics such as Khamar-Daban, Buryat Republic, and East Sayan. Females have either reddish or greenish coloured elytron and are 11 millimetres (0.43 in) in length.
