= Tunka Goltsy =

Mountain range in Buryatia, Russia

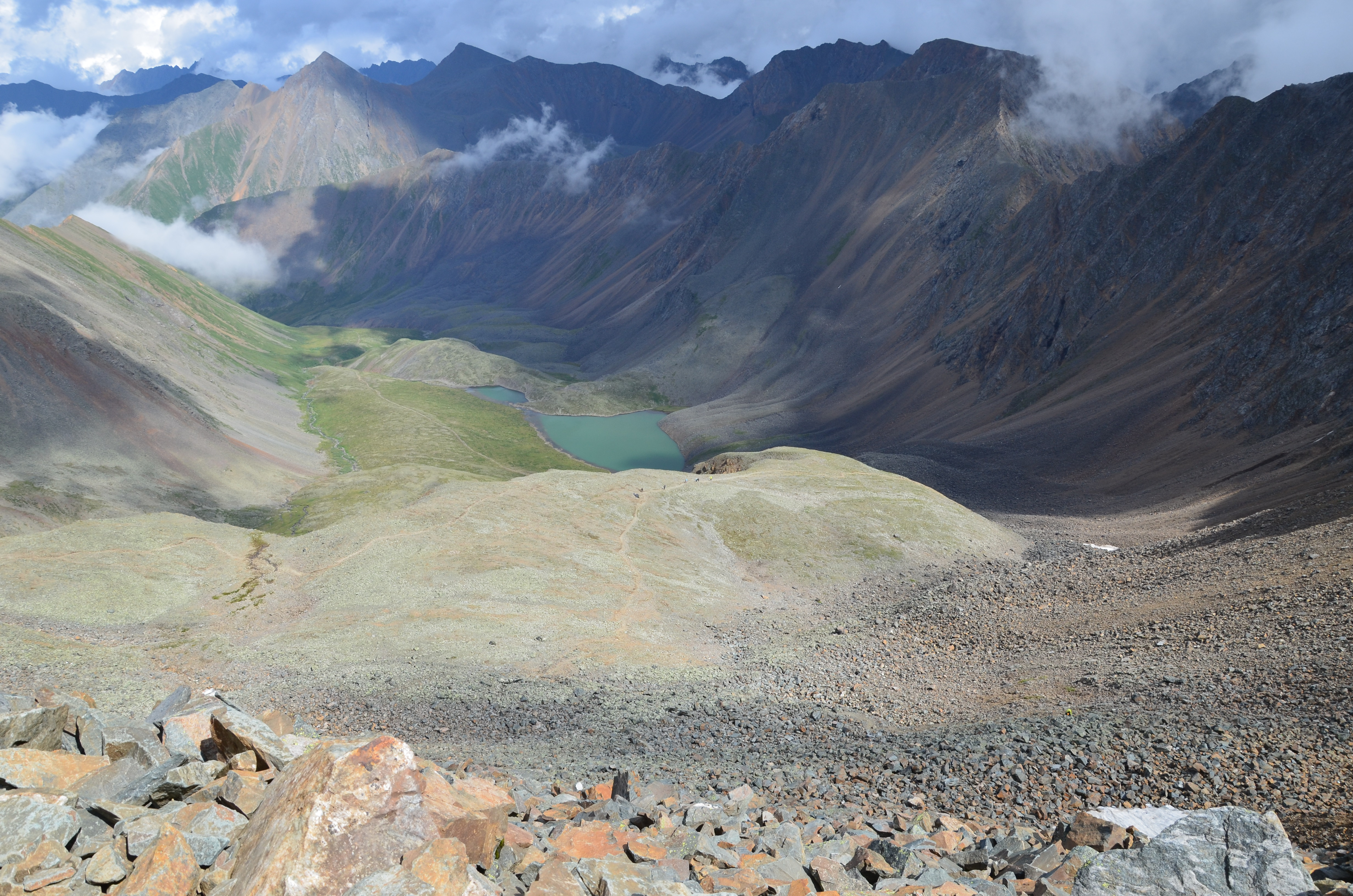
- View from Shumak Pass

Highest point
- Peak: Strelnikov Peak
- Elevation: 3,157 m (10,358 ft)

Dimensions
- Length: 160 km (99 mi)
- Width: 25 km (16 mi)

Naming
- Native name: Тункинские гольцы (Russian)

Geography
- Location within Republic of Buryatia
- Country: Russia
- Federal subject: Buryatia
- Range coordinates: 51°50′N 101°30′E
- Parent range: Sayan Mountains; South Siberian System

Geology
- Rock age: Paleozoic
- Rock types: Crystalline schist and granite

The Tunka Goltsy (Russian: Тункинские гольцы) is a mountain range in Buryatia, Far Eastern Federal District, Russia.

== Geography ==
Its length is 160 km, it is the easternmost part of the Eastern Sayan.

Highest summit Strelnikov Peak (Algan Mundarga), 3157 m.

Rivers: Irkut and other tributaries of Angara River

== See also ==
- List of mountains and hills of Russia
- Golets (geography)
- Tunkin Depression
