= Tunja (disambiguation) =

Tunja is a city in Colombia.

Tunja may also refer to:

- Tunja Airport, near the city in Colombia
- Tunja Province, a province of the former country of Gran Colombia
- Tunja (river), or Tundzha, a river in Bulgaria and Turkey
- Tunja Municipality, or Tundzha, in Bulgaria

== See also ==
- Tunca (disambiguation) (pronounced tunja in Turkish)
