= Tunca =

Tunca (Turkish pronunciation: [tund͡ʒa]) may refer to:

- Tunca (river), or Tundzha, a river in Bulgaria and Turkey
- Tunca, Ardeşen, a town in the districts of Ardeşen, Rize Province, Turkey
- Tunca, Şehzadeler, a neighbourhood in Şehzadeler, Manisa Province, Turkey

== People ==
- Birand Tunca, Turkish actor
- Tuna Tunca (born 2003), Turkish autistic long-distance swimmer

== See also ==
- Tunca Bridge, a bridge in Edirne, Turkey
- Tunka (disambiguation)
- Tunja (disambiguation)
