= Baikal Nature Reserve =

Nature reserve in Buryatia, Russia

- Russian: Байка́льский запове́дник
- IUCN category Ia (strict nature reserve)
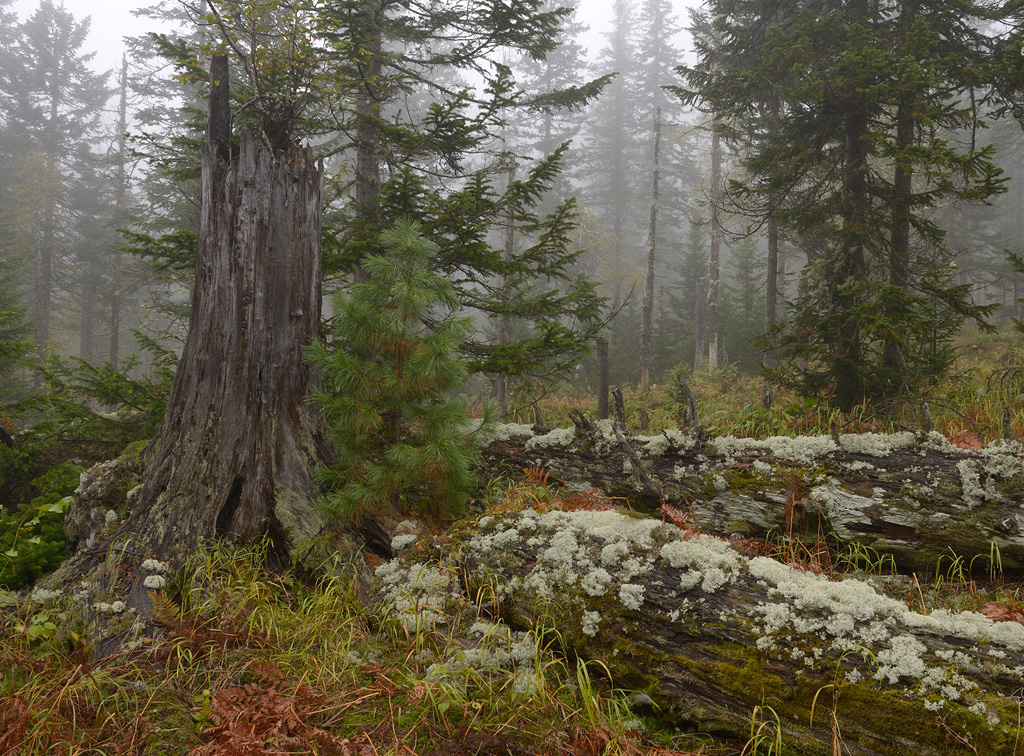
- Baikal Zapovednik

- Location within Russia
- Location: Buryatia, Russia
- Nearest city: Irkutsk
- Coordinates: 51°20′36″N 105°09′27″E
- Area: 165,700 hectares (409,000 acres; 640 sq mi)
- Created: 1969
- Governing body: Ministry of Natural Resources and Environment (Russia)
- Administrator: FGBU Baikal Reserve

The Baikal Nature Reserve (/baɪˈkɔːl/; Russian: Байка́льский запове́дник) is a nature reserve and "zapovednik" on the southeast shore of Lake Baikal, in southern Buryatia, Russia. Also called Baikal Zapovednik, it was established in 1969 for preserving the nature along the lake and the neighboring central part of the Khamar-Daban Range. The area of this nature reserve is 165,700 hectares [ha] (409,000 acres). It hosts dark pine taiga (silver fir, cedar, spruce), thin forests, Siberian Dwarf Pine and rhododendron underbrush, subalpine meadows, and alpine tundras. The Baikal Nature Reserve is home to 812 kinds of plants, 49 types of mammals, 272 birds, 3 reptiles, 3 amphibians, and 7 types of fish. The reserve is also home to East Siberian brown bear, Baikal lynx, wolverine, otter, osprey, and golden eagle. The Baikal Nature Reserve is part of the World Network of Biosphere Reserves (also see List of biosphere reserves in the Russian Federation). The reserve is also a part of the Lake Baikal World Heritage Site. The Kabansky Nature Zakaznik, across 12,100 ha (30,000 acres), was transferred under the jurisdiction of the Baikal Nature Reserve in 1985.

Since March 2011 the 78,373 hectares (193,660 acres) territory of the Altacheisky Federal Reserve in the Selenga Highlands falls under the jurisdiction of the Baikal Nature Reserve.

== See also ==
- List of Russian Nature Reserves (class 1a 'zapovedniks')
- National parks of Russia
