= Arshan, Republic of Buryatia =

Arshan Аршан

Other transcription(s)
  - Buryat: Аршаан
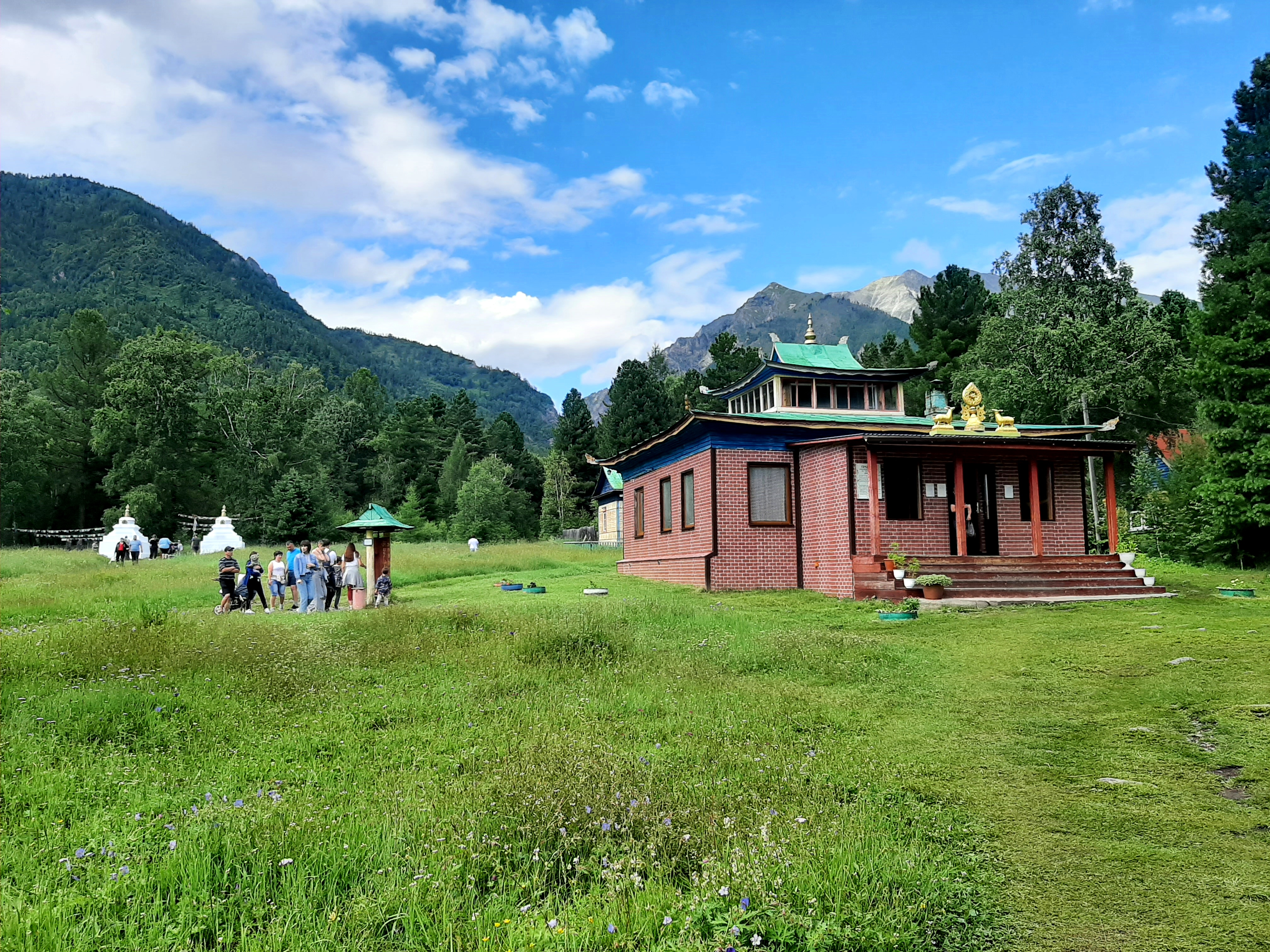
- Khoimorskii Datsan Bodkhitkharma in 2022
- Interactive map of Arshan
- Location of Arshan Arshan (Republic of Buryatia)
- Coordinates: 51°54′31″N 102°25′44″E
- Country: Russia
- Federal subject: Republic of Buryatia
- Founded: 1920

Population (2010 Census)
  - Total: 2,459

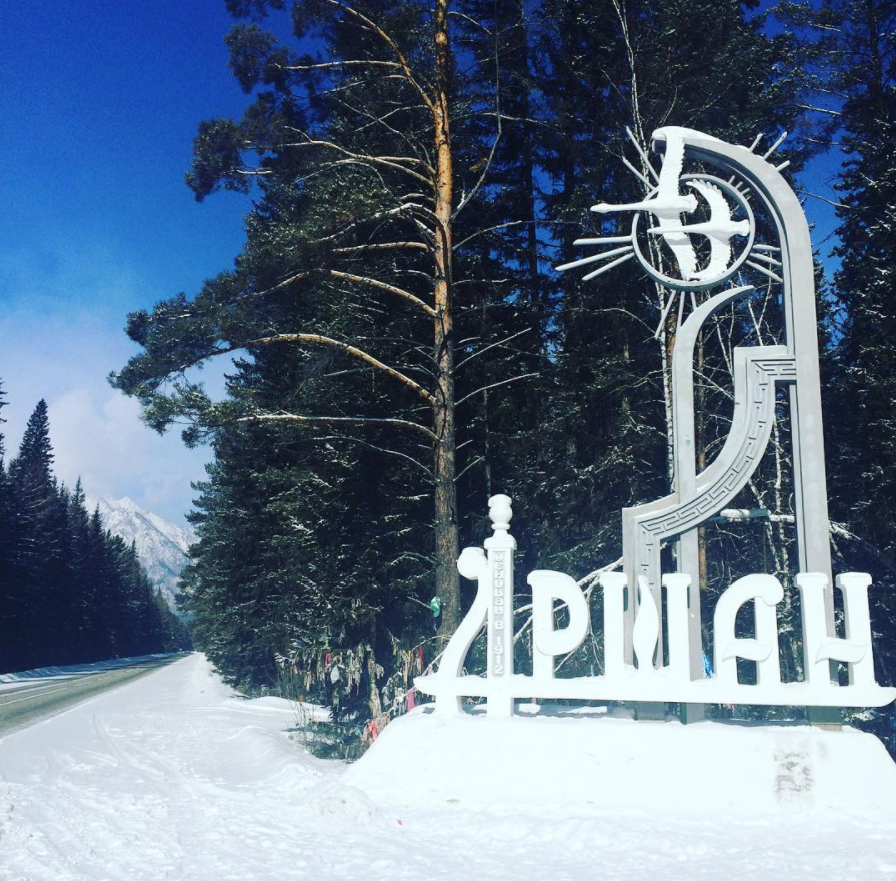
At the entrance to the village of Arshan

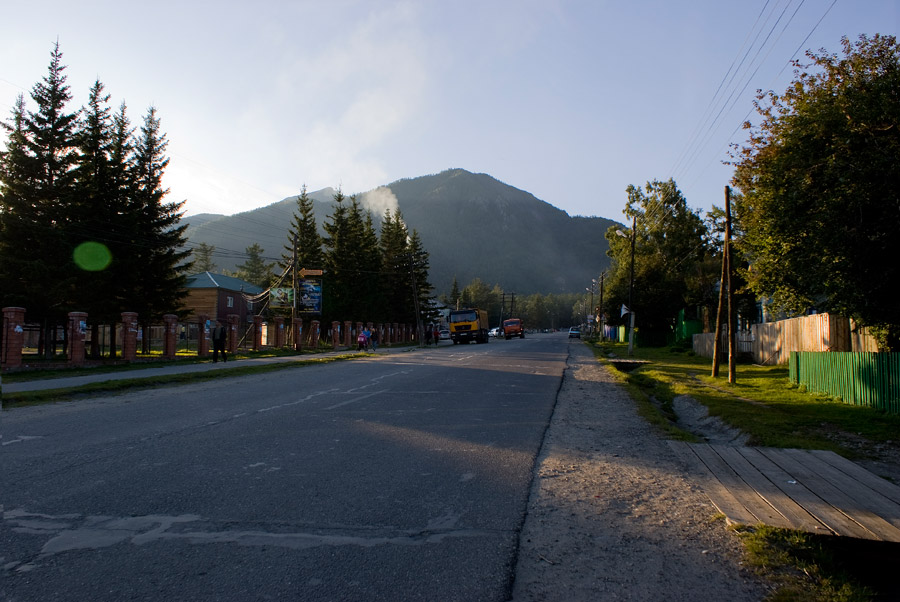
Principal street of Arshan

Arshan (Russian: Аршан; Buryat: Аршаан, Arshaan) is a small resort village in the Tunkinsky District, Republic of Buryatia, Russian Federation. It is known for its mineral waters, spa, and the Khoymorski Datsan (Хойморский дацан) Boddhidharma Tibetan Buddhist temple. The name comes from the Buryat word for "spring."

Arshan is located at an altitude of 900 m in a valley at the foot of the snow-capped Sayan Range and the Tunkin Pinnacles. It is 120 km from the Kultuk railway station, 479 km from Ulan-Ude, and 210 km from Irkutsk. Arshan is built on the banks of the Kyngyrga River of the Eastern Sayan Range, which has more than 12 waterfalls. The village is the center of the Arshan rural municipal district.

== History ==
On August 9, 1894, the Khoymorsky missionary Chistokhin gave a presentation about the mineral springs at a meeting of the Academic Council of Tomsk State University. By the end of the 19th century, there were 52 permanent residents and 40 vacation homes.

In May, 1920, after the Tunkinsky valley was liberated from Kolchak's White Cossacks, the governor of Irkutsk ordered Arshan to take on the wounded from the Red army. During 1920, 320 people rested and were treated there. In 1922, a bath complex was built, and in 1925, two-bedroom housing was built. In 1926, a small hydroelectric plant was built on the Kyngyrga River.

In Summer 1927, the carbonated mineral water plant began production. In 1932, a cafeteria building was built.

Arshan had the status of urban settlement from 1975 to 1979.

== Present ==
The Arshan resort is made up of two sanatoriums: Sayan and Arshan, both in the Baikal spa trade union. The Khoymorsky Datsan temple is also located on the grounds.

The main therapeutic factors in the mildly acidic thermal water are carbon, low-mineralized silicates, sulfates, magnesi-hydrocarbons and sulfide silt mud, which are reputed to effectively treat diseases of the metabolism and the digestive, circulatory, respiratory, urinary and endocrine systems. The waters range in temperature from 11 to 45 °C. The waters belong to Class 1 of the classification system of V. A. Alexandrova because of their high carbolic acid gas content.

The sanatorium treatment includes modern diagnostic methods, drinking the therapeutic Arshan water, balneotherapy (baths, showers and irrigation), climate, diet therapy, physical therapy, paraffin ozokerite therapy, massage, halotherapy, and inhalation therapy. The water used for bathing and drinking is bottled. The Chief Physician at the resort is Vladimir Ivanovich Songolov.

One of the largest waterfalls on the Kyngurga River is a half-hour walk from the town. In the vicinity, there are more than 20 active volcanoes. Although the last eruption was in the Mesozoic era, the volcanoes are not considered completely extinct because of the presence of numerous hot springs. The mineral springs of Suburga and Papi Arshan are nearby.

== Climate ==
The climate is continental. Winter is long and cold, summers are short and moderately warm. 595 mm of precipitation per year (maximum in summer). Diseases: Mineral water is one of the sources.

Climate data for Arshan (normals 1971−2000)
Month	Jan	Feb	Mar	Apr	May	Jun	Jul	Aug	Sep	Oct	Nov	Dec	Year
Mean daily maximum °C (°F)	−17 (1)	−15 (5)	−3 (27)	8 (46)	16 (61)	23 (73)	25 (77)	22 (72)	15 (59)	6 (43)	−7 (19)	−14 (7)	5 (41)
Average precipitation mm (inches)	15 (0.6)	10 (0.4)	10 (0.4)	15 (0.6)	20 (0.8)	50 (2.0)	90 (3.5)	85 (3.3)	40 (1.6)	20 (0.8)	25 (1.0)	25 (1.0)	405 (16)
Source: Pogoda.ru.net

== Transportation ==
The resort is connected by regular bus service from Irkutsk, Ulan-Ude, Slyudyanka and Kyren.

== Telecommunications ==
There are four mobile operators in Arshan: Baikalvestcom (BVK), MegaFon, MTS and Beeline.

== Images ==
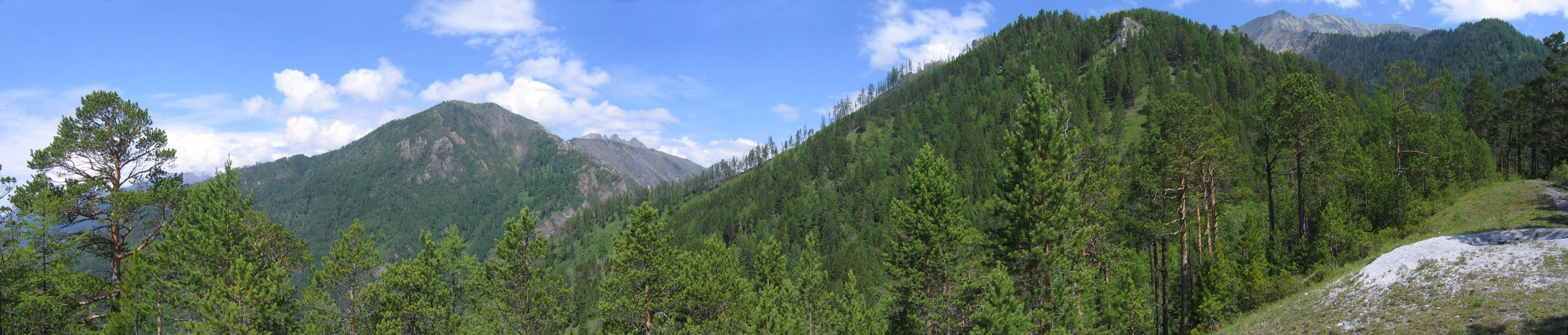
View of the Sayan Range and Lovers' Peak

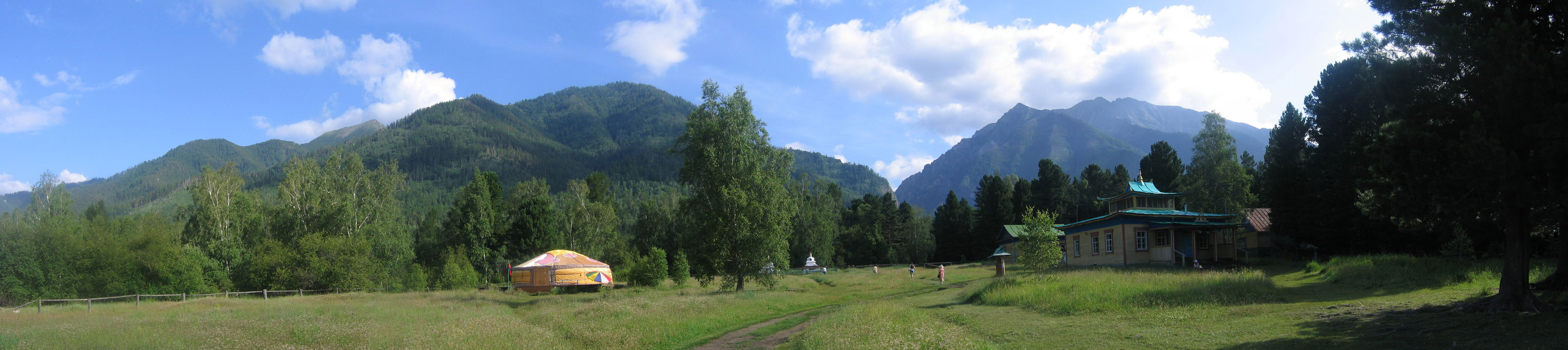
Boddhidharma Datsan

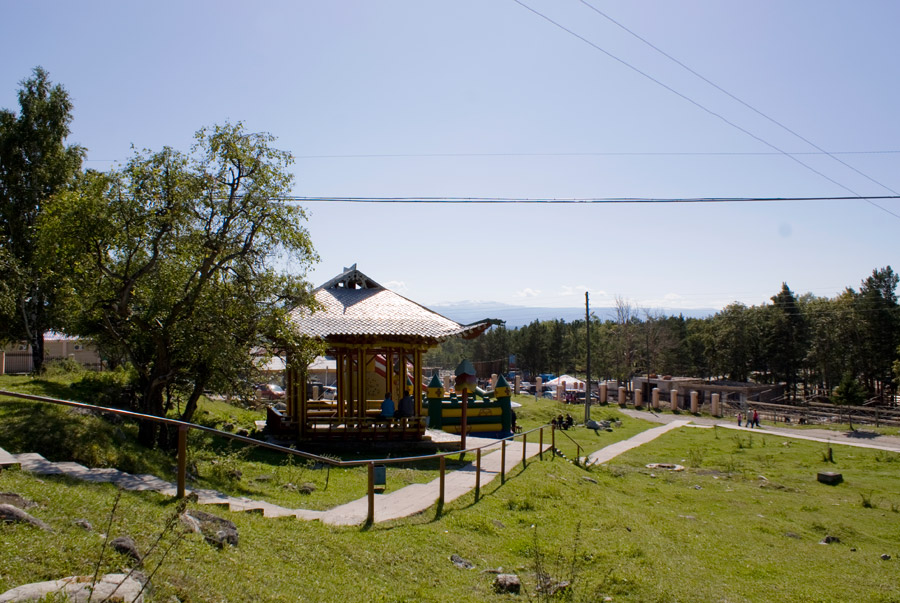
Park area

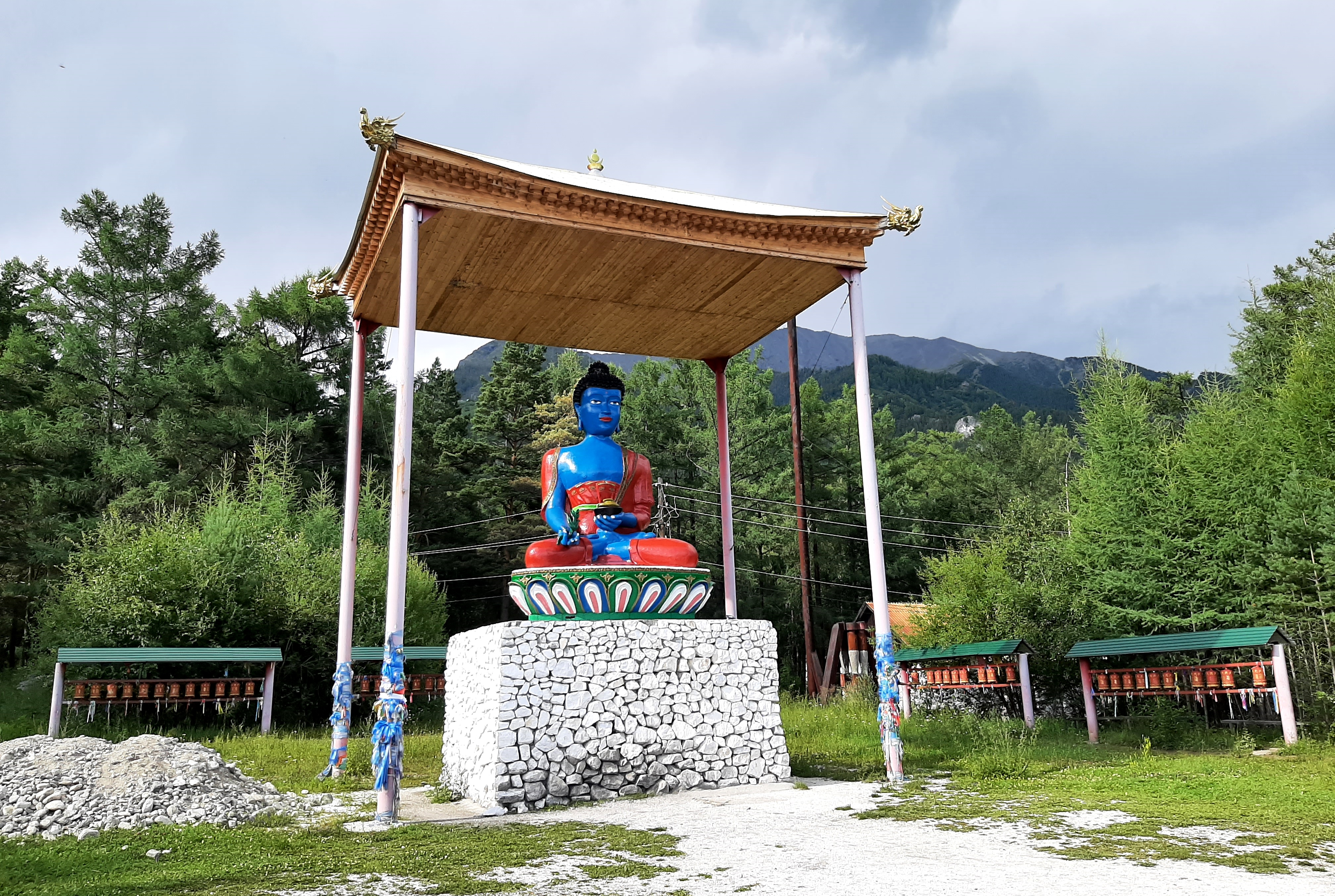
Buddha of Medicine

== Bibliography ==
- The Republic of Buryatia: recreational resources. Resorts of Siberia: Siberian Agreement. Mass Media Center MA "Siberian Agreement". Novosibirsk, 2000.
- Tkachuk, V.G. East-Sayan region of thermal carbonic waters of different temperatures. Tkachuk V. Mineral Waters of the Buryat-Mongol Autonomous Soviet Socialist Republic / Acad. Sciences of the USSR. East Siberia phil., V. Tkachuk, N.V. Yasnitskaya, G.A. Ankudinova. Irkutsk, 1957.
- Tsvetkov, M. The Arshan Resort. Tunkinsky region: report of official business. Auditor-trip on land acquisition. M.A. Tsvetkov. Land management and agriculture. SPb, 1911.
- Mikhailov, M.P. Arshan as mountain-climatic station / State. Plan. Commission. BMASSR. Verkhneudinsk, 1926.
- Mikhailov, M.P. The Arshan resort of Tunkinsky (spa resort and mountain-climatic station). M.P. Mikhailov. resorts of Siberia and the East Siberian Region, their past and present: the value resorts for the region, particularly the instance of disease in the province. M.P. Mikhailov, V.N. Zhinkin. Irkutsk, 1932.
