= Mount Chersky =

Mountain in Russia

- Гора Черского
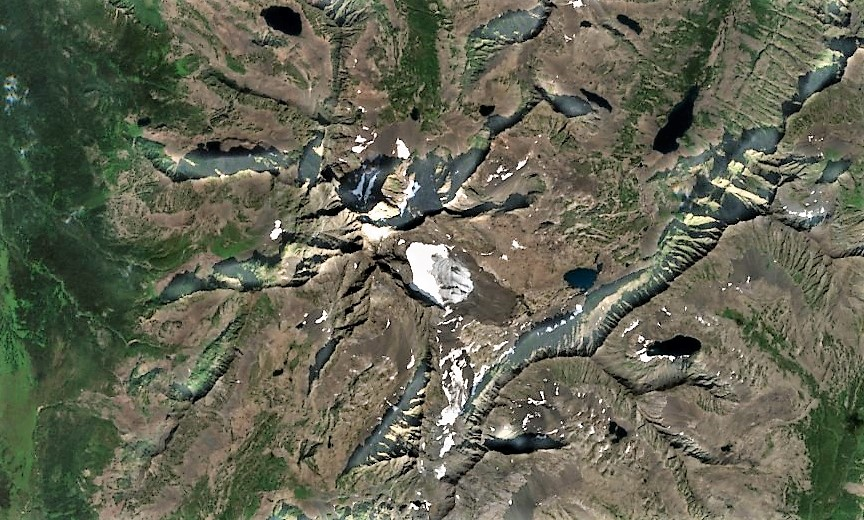
- Mt Chersky Sentinel-2 image

Highest point
- Elevation: 2,572 m (8,438 ft)
- Prominence: 1,596 m (5,236 ft)
- Listing: List of ultras of Northeast Asia, Ribu
- Coordinates: 55°03′56″N 108°41′06″E

Geography
- Location within Republic of Buryatia
- Location: Buryatia / Irkutsk Oblast; Russian Far East
- Parent range: Baikal Range, South Siberian Mountains

Mount Chersky (Russian: Гора Черского) is a mountain in the Baikal Range, Russian Federation.

This peak is named after Lithuanian explorer Jan Czerski (1845 - 1892, Ivan Chersky transcribed from Russian), who greatly contributed to the study of Lake Baikal.

== Geography ==
This 2,572 m (8,438 ft) high mountain is the highest point of the Baikal Range, part of the South Siberian System of ranges. It is an ultra-prominent peak, located near Lake Baikal, in the border of Irkutsk Oblast and Buryatia.

== See also ==
- List of mountains and hills of Russia
- List of ultras of Northeast Asia
