= Chersky Peak =

Mountain in Russia

- Пик Черского / Хара-Болдог
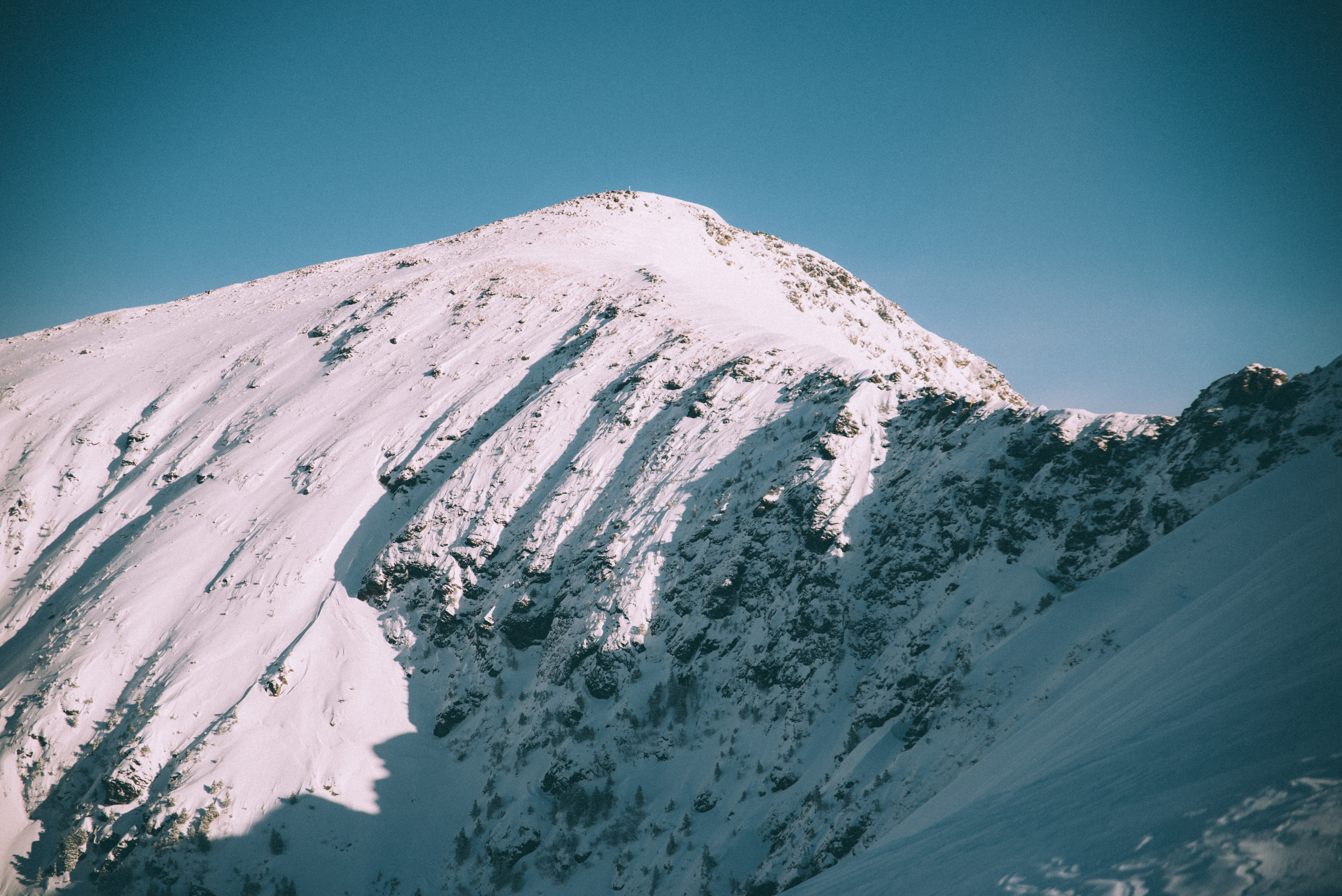
- View of the peak in February

Highest point
- Elevation: 2,090 m (6,860 ft)
- Prominence: 352 m (1,155 ft)
- Coordinates: 51°30′56″N 103°37′33″E

Geography
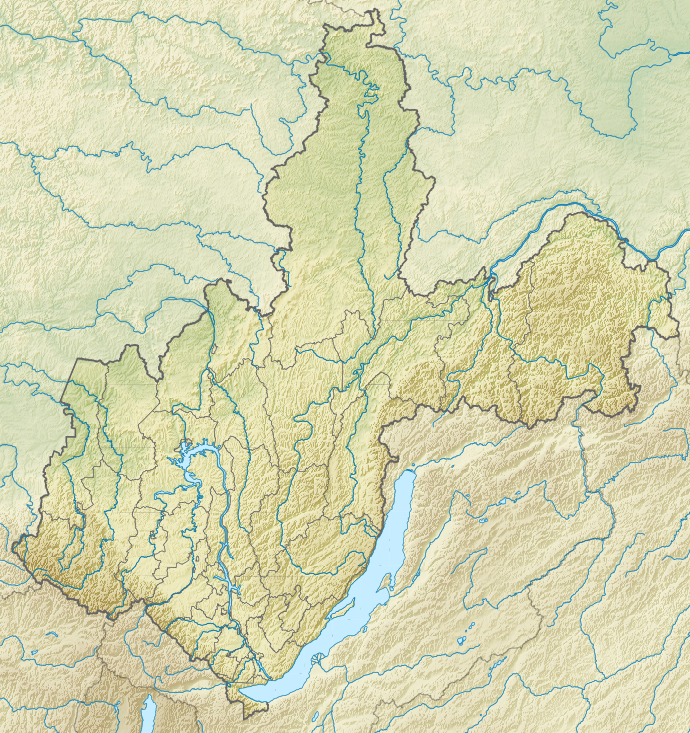
- Location within Irkutsk Oblast
- Location: Irkutsk Oblast; Russian Far East
- Parent range: Khamar-Daban, South Siberian Mountains

Chersky Peak (Russian: Пик Черского; Buryat: Хара-Болдог) is a mountain in the Komarinsky Range, Khamar-Daban, Russian Federation.

This peak is named after Polish explorer Jan Czerski (1845–1892), who greatly contributed to the study of neighboring Lake Baikal.

== Geography ==
This 2,090 m high peak is one of the highest points of the Khamar-Daban Range, part of the South Siberian System of ranges. It rises in the Komarinsky subrange of the Khamar-Daban. Administratively the Chersky Peak is part of the Slyudyansky District, at the southern end of Irkutsk Oblast. Lake Serdtse is located below the southern slopes of the mountain.

== See also ==
- List of mountains and hills of Russia
