= Baikal Mountains =

Mountain range in southern Siberia, Russia

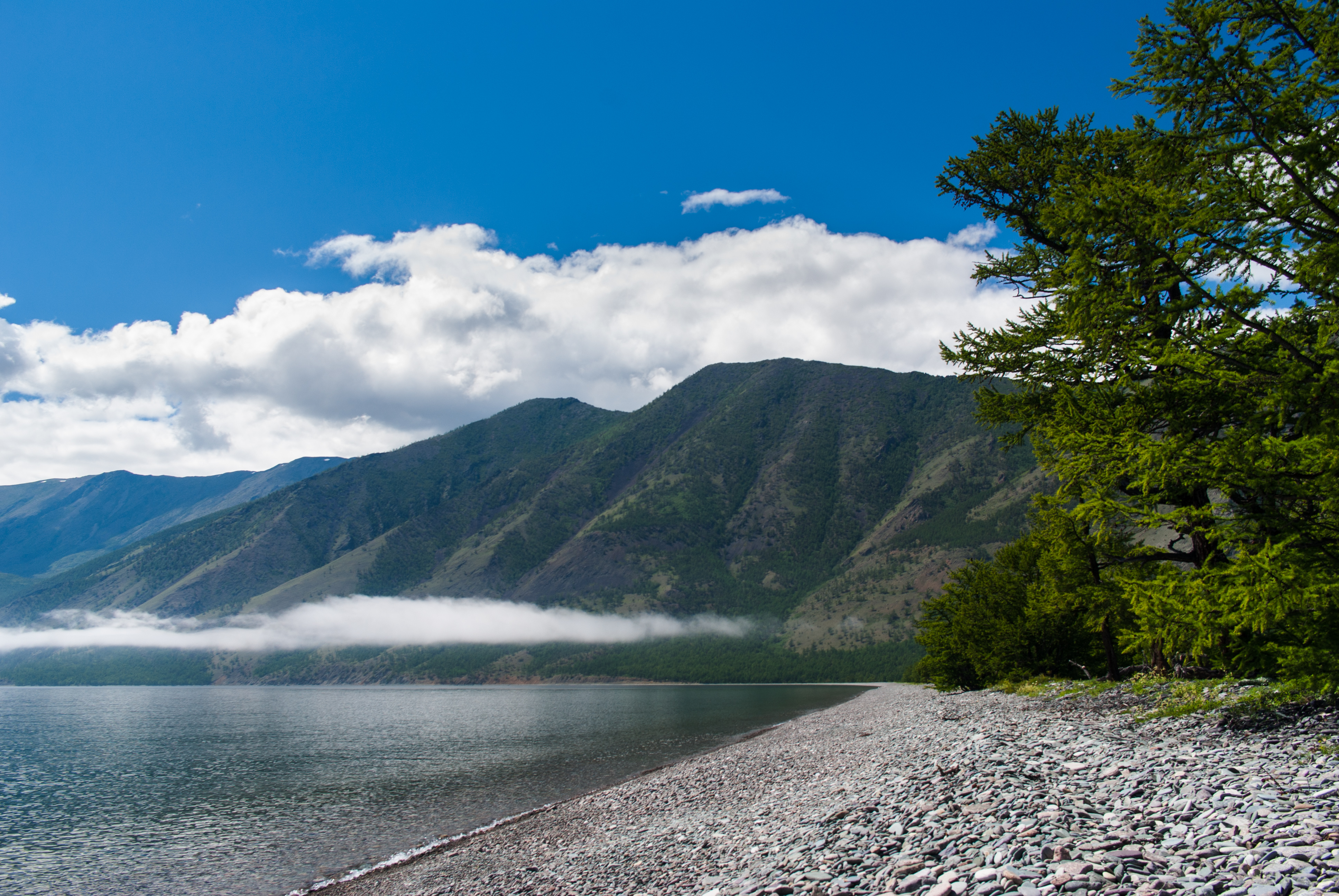
- View of the mountains

Highest point
- Peak: Mount Chersky
- Elevation: 2,572 m (8,438 ft)

Naming
- Native name: Байкальский хребет (Russian)

Geography
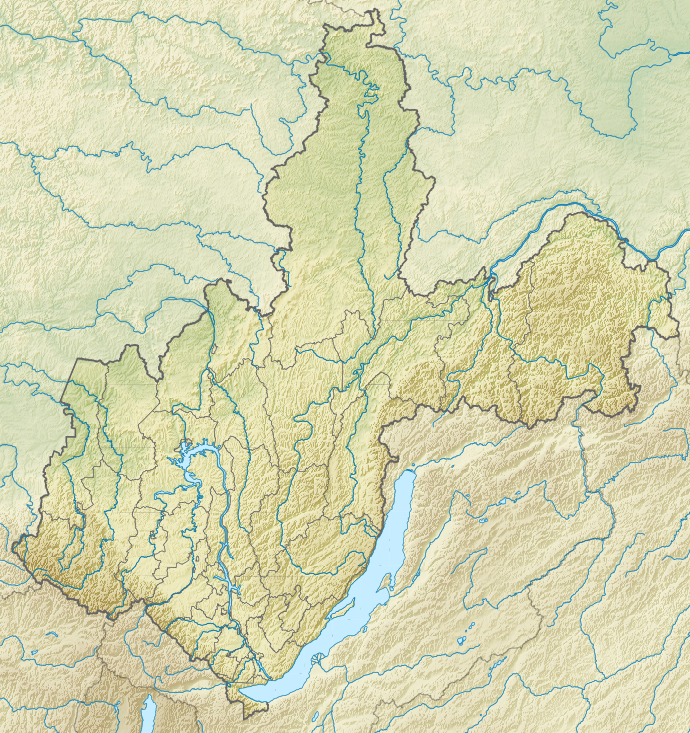
- Location within Irkutsk Oblast
- Country: Russia
- Federal Subject: Buryatia and Irkutsk Oblast
- Range coordinates: 55°00′N 108°00′E
- Parent range: South Siberian Mountains

The Baikal Mountains or Baikal Range (Russian: Байкальский хребет, Baykalskiy khrebet; Buryat: Байгалай дабаан, Baigalai dabaan) are a mountain range that rises steeply over the northwestern shore of Lake Baikal in southern Siberia, Russia. The highest peak in the range is 2,572 m high Mount Chersky, named after Russian explorer Ivan Chersky.

== Geography ==
The Baikal Mountains are connected with the Primorsky Range to the south, which also stretches along the lakeshore. The Akitkan Range, part of the North Baikal Highlands, is a northern extension of the mountain chain. These mountains are the origin of the Lena River. The Lena-Angara Plateau, part of the Central Siberian Plateau, lies to the west of the Baikal Mountains.

== Flora ==
The mountain slopes near Lake Baikal are densely wooded with grey alder, Eurasian aspen, downy birch, Siberian larch, Siberian fir, Scots pine, and Siberian spruce.
