= Khamar-Daban =

Mountain range in Russia

- Хама́р-Даба́н / Һамар дабаан
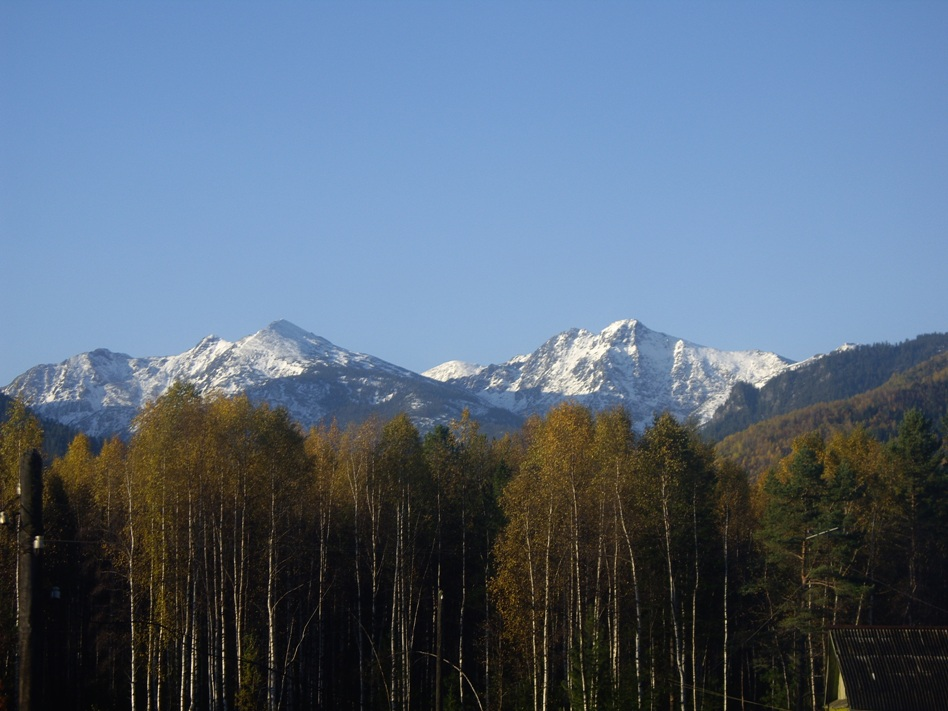
- Landscape of the range

Highest point
- Peak: Utulinskaya Podkova
- Elevation: 2,396 m (7,861 ft)

Dimensions
- Length: 420 km (260 mi) E/W
- Width: 65 km (40 mi) N/S

Geography
- Location within Far Eastern Federal District Location within Republic of Buryatia
- Country: Russia
- Federal subject: Buryatia; Irkutsk Oblast
- Range coordinates: 51°25′N 104°30′E
- Parent range: South Siberian System
- Borders on: Eastern Sayan

Geology
- Rock types: Slate; gneiss; basalt; limestone; granite intrusions

Climbing
- Easiest route: From Gusinoozyorsk

Khamar-Daban (Russian: Хама́р-Даба́н; Buryat: Һамар дабаан, from хамар – "nut", and дабаан – "pass" or "ridge"), is a mountain range in Southern Siberia, Russia.

== Geography ==
The range is located in Buryatia, with a small section in Irkutsk Oblast. It rises near the Baikal Mountains not far from Lake Baikal. It forms a geographic prolongation of the Sayan Mountains. The highest peak is Utulinskaya Podkova at 2,396 m (7,861 ft); 2,090 m (6,860 ft) high Chersky Peak is another important summit. The southern end of the range is part of the Selenga Highlands. The climate of the northern part of the range is affected by Lake Baikal, being temperate and humid, with precipitation up to 1,300 mm (51 in) per year. The average January temperature is −16 to −18 °C (3 to 0 °F).

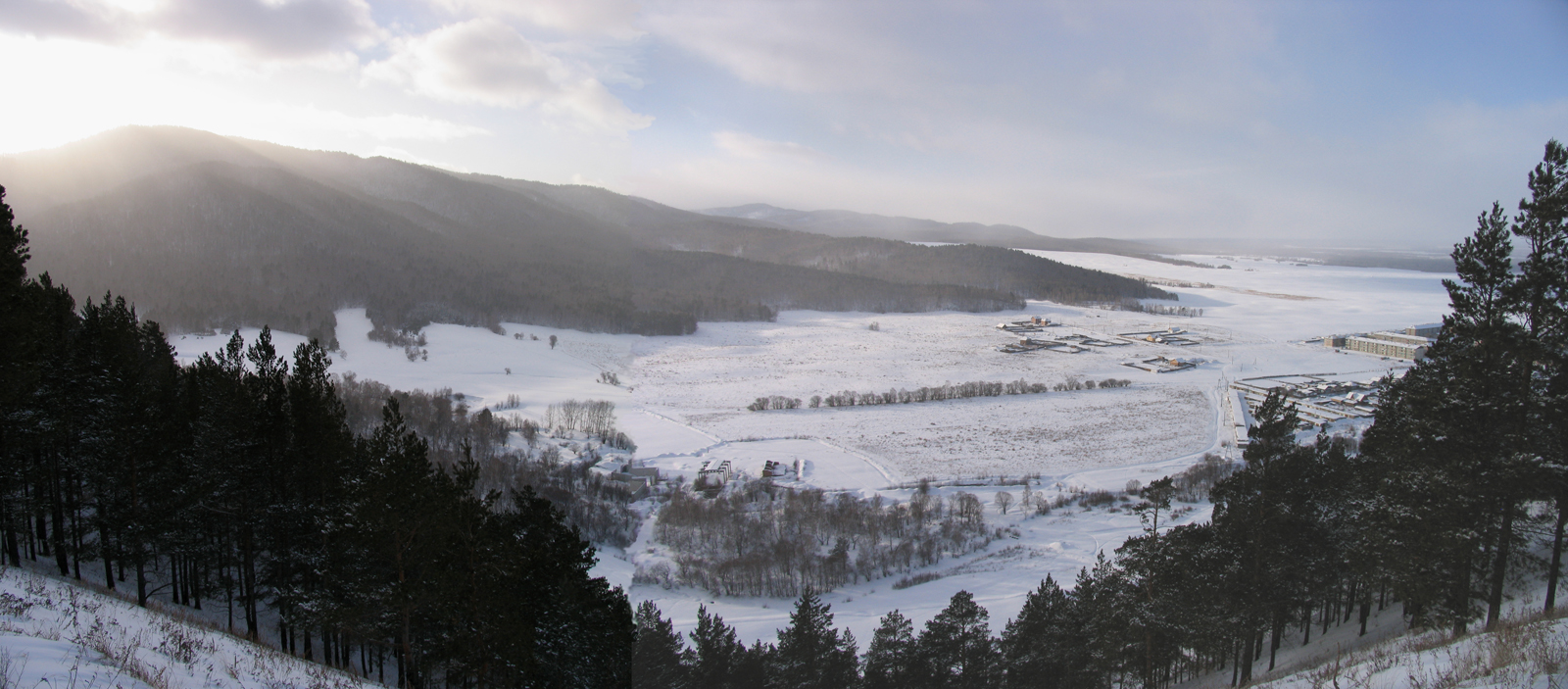
The Khamar-Daban Range, near Kamensk.

=== Climate ===
Climate data for Khamar-Daban
Month	Jan	Feb	Mar	Apr	May	Jun	Jul	Aug	Sep	Oct	Nov	Dec	Year
Record high °C (°F)	8.7 (47.7)	8.9 (48.0)	14.0 (57.2)	20.4 (68.7)	27.7 (81.9)	32.0 (89.6)	31.5 (88.7)	30.8 (87.4)	25.7 (78.3)	24.2 (75.6)	13.2 (55.8)	7.8 (46.0)	32.0 (89.6)
Mean daily maximum °C (°F)	−11.0 (12.2)	−9.3 (15.3)	−4.1 (24.6)	2.8 (37.0)	9.8 (49.6)	16.0 (60.8)	17.8 (64.0)	15.9 (60.6)	10.1 (50.2)	3.8 (38.8)	−4.6 (23.7)	−9.3 (15.3)	3.2 (37.7)
Daily mean °C (°F)	−16.6 (2.1)	−15.2 (4.6)	−10.2 (13.6)	−3.1 (26.4)	3.9 (39.0)	10.7 (51.3)	13.2 (55.8)	11.3 (52.3)	4.7 (40.5)	−2.1 (28.2)	−10.4 (13.3)	−14.9 (5.2)	−2.4 (27.7)
Mean daily minimum °C (°F)	−21.2 (−6.2)	−20.1 (−4.2)	−15.3 (4.5)	−8.3 (17.1)	−1.3 (29.7)	5.4 (41.7)	8.7 (47.7)	6.8 (44.2)	0.6 (33.1)	−6.7 (19.9)	−15.3 (4.5)	−19.6 (−3.3)	−7.2 (19.1)
Record low °C (°F)	−38.6 (−37.5)	−39.6 (−39.3)	−33.4 (−28.1)	−28.5 (−19.3)	−16.4 (2.5)	−8.3 (17.1)	−2.0 (28.4)	−6.2 (20.8)	−13.0 (8.6)	−27.2 (−17.0)	−34.8 (−30.6)	−37.0 (−34.6)	−39.6 (−39.3)
Average precipitation mm (inches)	30 (1.2)	33 (1.3)	63 (2.5)	99 (3.9)	120 (4.7)	189 (7.4)	265 (10.4)	230 (9.1)	155 (6.1)	83 (3.3)	64 (2.5)	46 (1.8)	1,377 (54.2)
Average precipitation days (≥ 0.1 mm)	13.3	11.7	13.8	15.8	15.8	17.5	19.6	19.2	15.1	13.2	14.2	14.4	183.6
Source: climatebase.ru

== In popular culture ==
The song of the same name by Yuri Vizbor, written in 1962, is dedicated to the range. The story of Khamar-Daban began to arise again in the 21st century.

== See also ==
- Baikal Nature Reserve
- South Siberian Mountains
- Khamar-Daban incident
