= Irkut (river) =

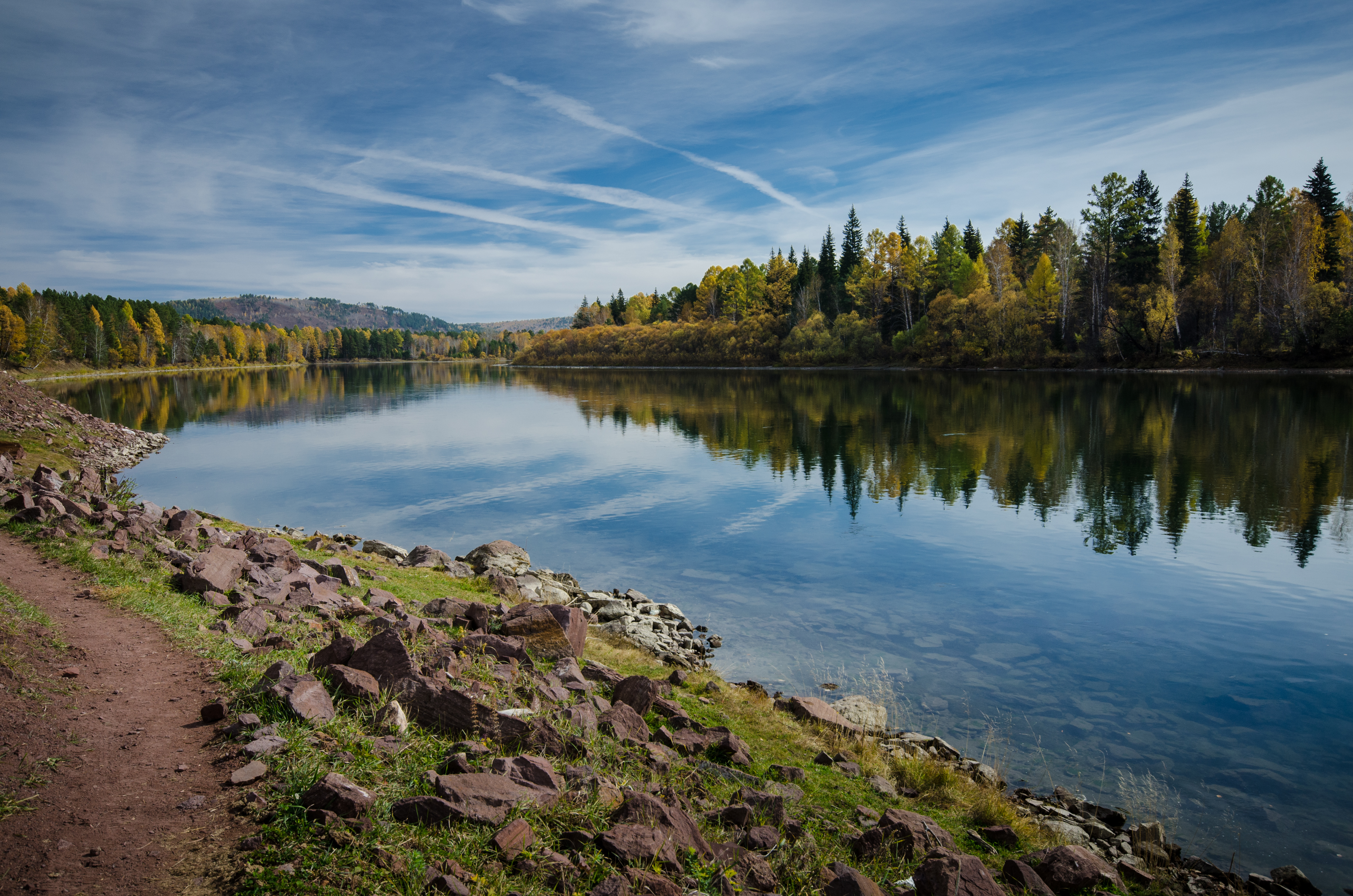

Location
- Country: Russia

Physical characteristics
- Mouth: Angara
  - coordinates: 52.2907°N 104.2754°E
- Length: 488 km (303 mi)
- Basin size: 15,000 km^{2} (5,800 sq mi)

Basin features
- Progression: Angara→ Yenisey→ Kara Sea

The Irkut (Russian: Ирку́т; Buryat and Mongolian: Эрхүү гол, Erhüü gol) is a river in the Buryat Republic and Irkutsk Oblast of Russia. It is a left tributary of the Angara. It flows out of lake Ilchir which is situated 50 km away from the highest peak of the Eastern Sayan Mountains, Munku-Sardyk. The length of the river is 488 kilometers (303 mi). The area of its basin is 15,000 square kilometers (5,800 sq mi). The Irkut freezes up in late October or mid-November and stays icebound until late April or early May. The city of Irkutsk is located at the mouth of the Irkut on the Angara.

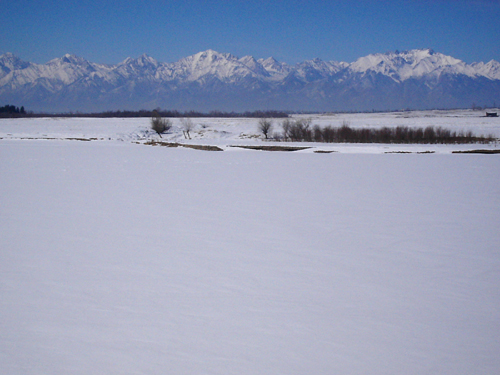
Irkut near the village of Zaktuy in the Tunkinsky National Park

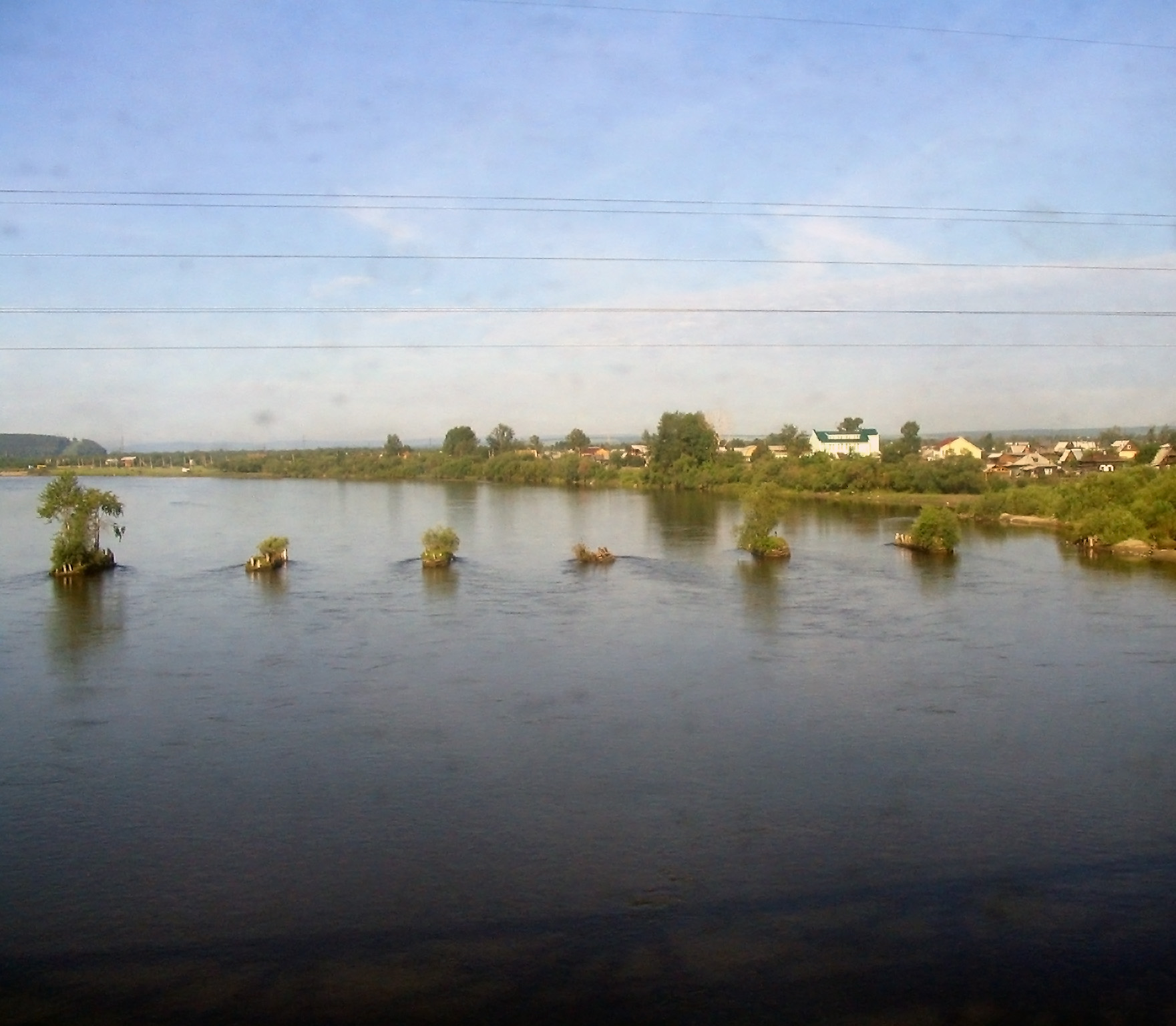
The Irkut as seen from a train window (near its confluence with the Angara)

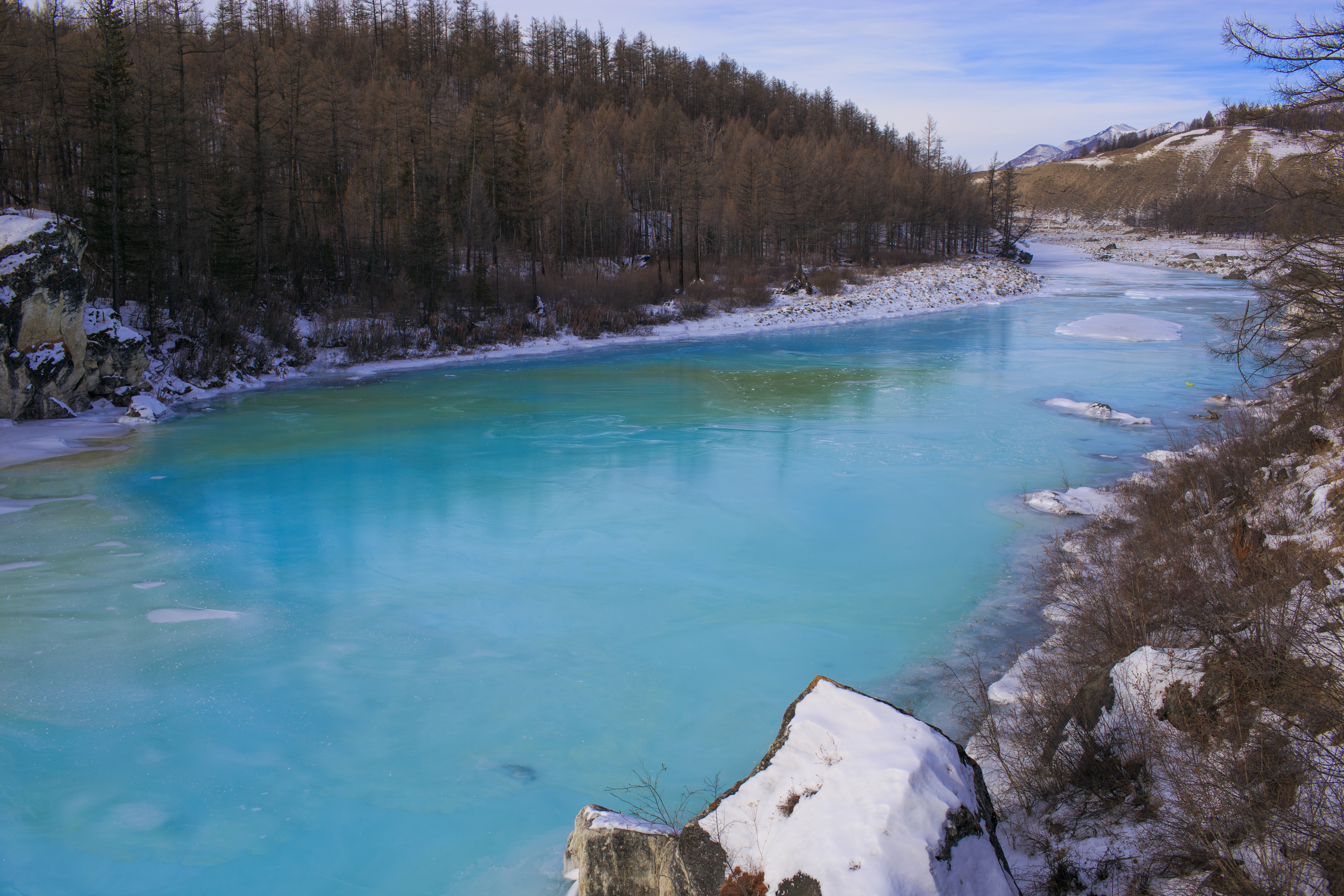
The Irkut in Buryatia (early February)
