= Kyren, Republic of Buryatia =

Kyren Кырен
- Selo

Other transcription(s)
  - Buryat: Хэрэн
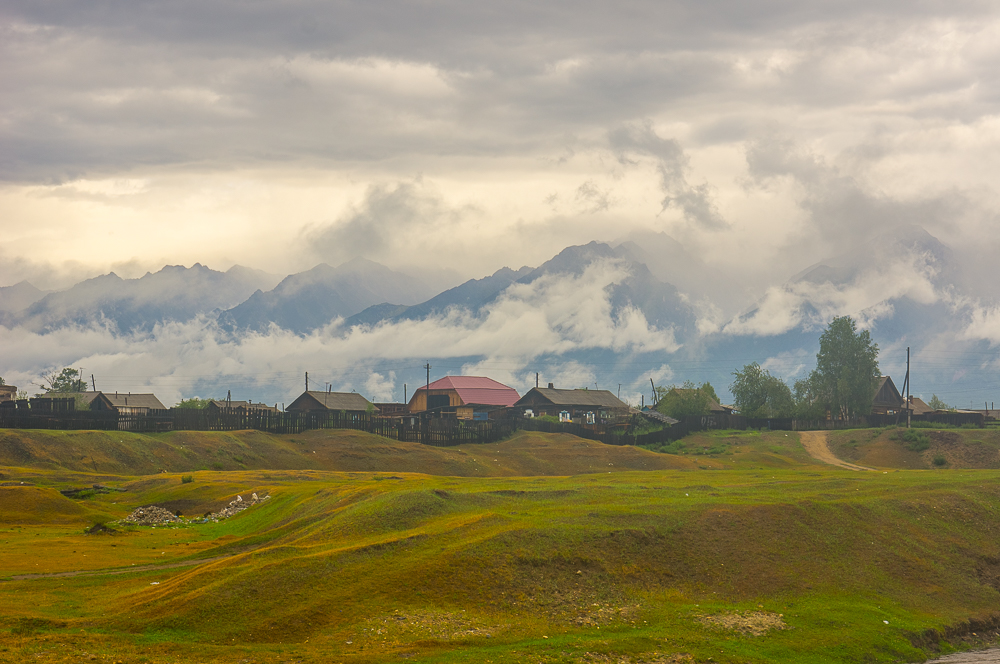
- Village of Kyren
- Interactive map of Kyren
- Location of Kyren Kyren (Republic of Buryatia)
- Coordinates: 51°40′53″N 102°07′46″E
- Country: Russia
- Federal subject: Buryatia
- Administrative district: Tunkinsky District
- SelsovietSelsoviet: Kyrensky

Population (2010 Census)
  - Total: 5,406
  - Estimate (2025): 5,856 (+8.3%)

Administrative status
  - Capital of: Tunkinsky District, Kyrensky Selsoviet

Municipal status
  - Municipal district: Tunkinsky Municipal District
  - Rural settlement: Kyrenskoye Rural Settlement
  - Capital of: Tunkinsky Municipal District, Kyrenskoye Rural Settlement
- Time zone: UTC+8 (MSK+5)
- Postal code: 671010
- OKTMO ID: 81651420101

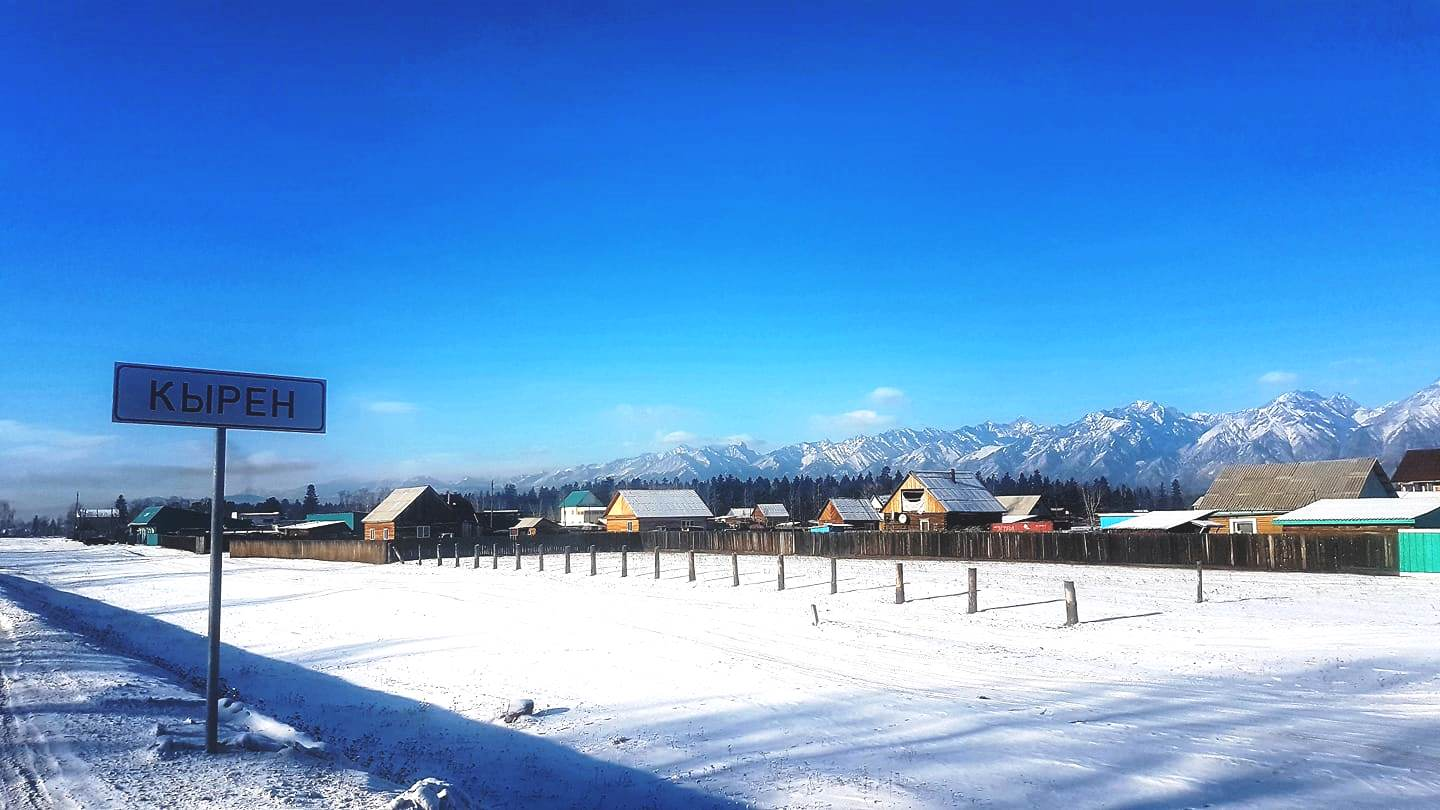
Kyren in winter

Kyren (Russian: Кыре́н, pronounced [kɨˈrʲen]; Buryat: Хэрэн, romanized: Kheren) is a rural locality (a selo) and the administrative center of Tunkinsky District of the Republic of Buryatia, Russia. Population: 5,406 (2010 census); 5,433 (2002 census); 6,128 (1989 Soviet census).

== See also ==
- Kyren Airport
