= Tunkinsky District =

Tunkinsky District Тункинский район (Russian)
- District

Other transcription(s)
  - Buryat: Түнхэнэй аймаг
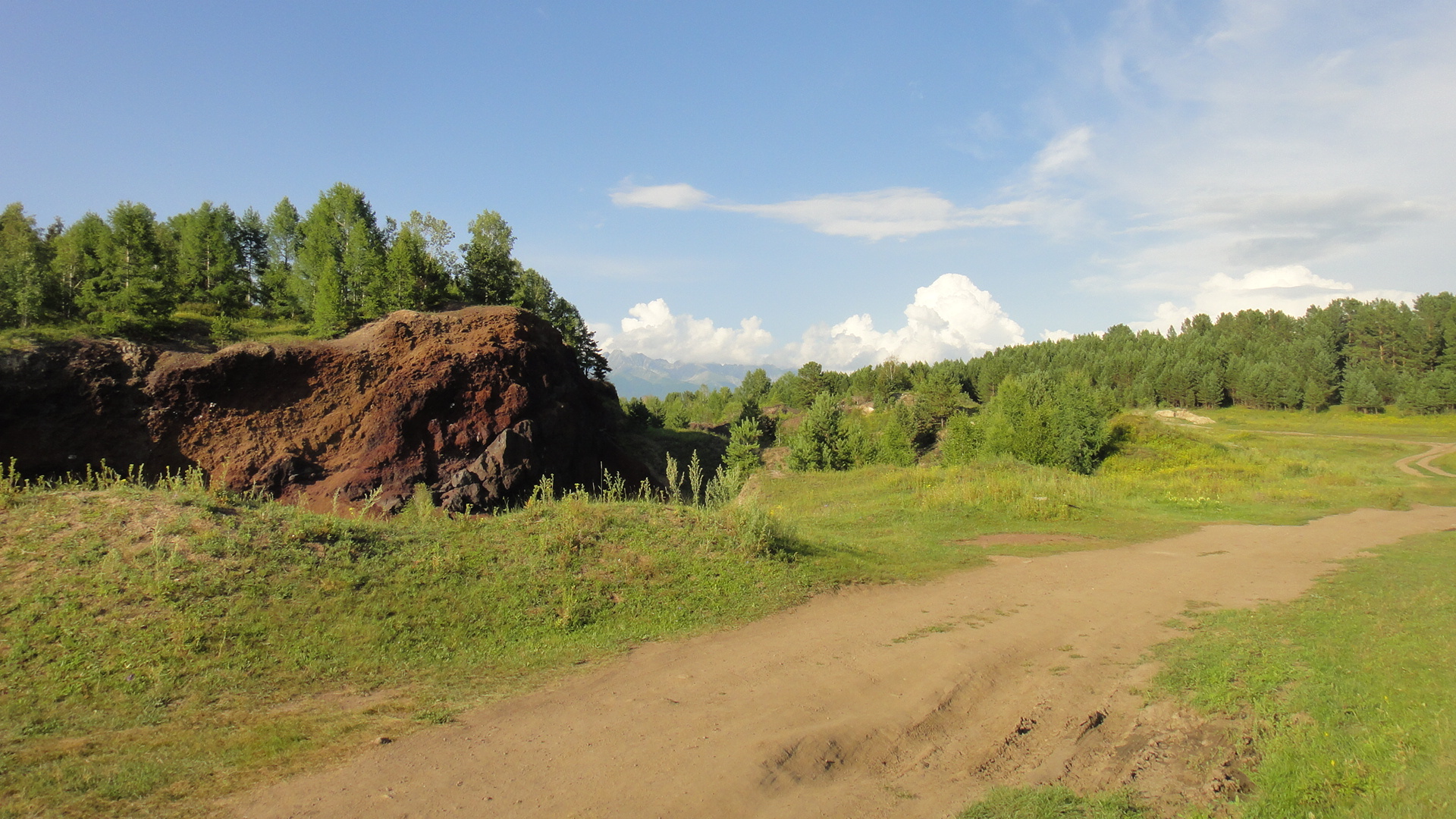
- Volcanoes near the settlement of Arshan in Tunkinsky District

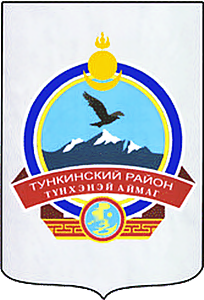
- Coat of arms
- Location of Tunkinsky District in the Buryat Republic
- Coordinates: 51°41′N 102°08′E
- Country: Russia
- Federal subject: Republic of Buryatia
- Established: 12 December 1923
- Administrative center: Kyren

Area
  - Total: 11,791.62 km^{2} (4,552.77 sq mi)

Population (2010 Census)
  - Total: 22,672
  - Density: 1.9227/km^{2} (4.9798/sq mi)
  - Urban: 0%
  - Rural: 100%

Administrative structure
  - Administrative divisions: 5 Selsoviets, 7 Somons
  - Inhabited localities: 35 rural localities

Municipal structure
  - Municipally incorporated as: Tunkinsky Municipal District
  - Municipal divisions: 0 urban settlements, 14 rural settlements
- Time zone: UTC+8 (MSK+5)
- OKTMO ID: 81651000
- Website: http://admtnk.sdep.ru/

Population of Tunkinsky District
- 2010 Census: 22,672
- 2002 Census: 24,173
- 1989 Census: 27,771
- 1979 Census: 27,429

Tunkinsky District (Russian: Тунки́нский райо́н; Buryat: Түнхэнэй аймаг, Tünkhenei aimag) is an administrative and municipal district (raion), one of the twenty-one in the Republic of Buryatia, Russia. It is located in the west of the republic. The area of the district is 11,791.62 square kilometers (4,552.77 sq mi). Its administrative center is the rural locality (a selo) of Kyren. As of the 2010 Census, the total population of the district was 22,672, with the population of Kyren accounting for 23.8% of that number.

== Administrative and municipal status ==
Within the framework of administrative divisions, Tunkinsky District is one of the twenty-one in the Republic of Buryatia. The district is divided into five selsoviets and seven somons, which comprise thirty-five rural localities. As a municipal division, the district is incorporated as Tunkinsky Municipal District. Its five selsoviets and seven somons are incorporated as fourteen rural settlements within the municipal district. The selo of Kyren serves as the administrative center of both the administrative and municipal district.
