= Buddhism in Russia =

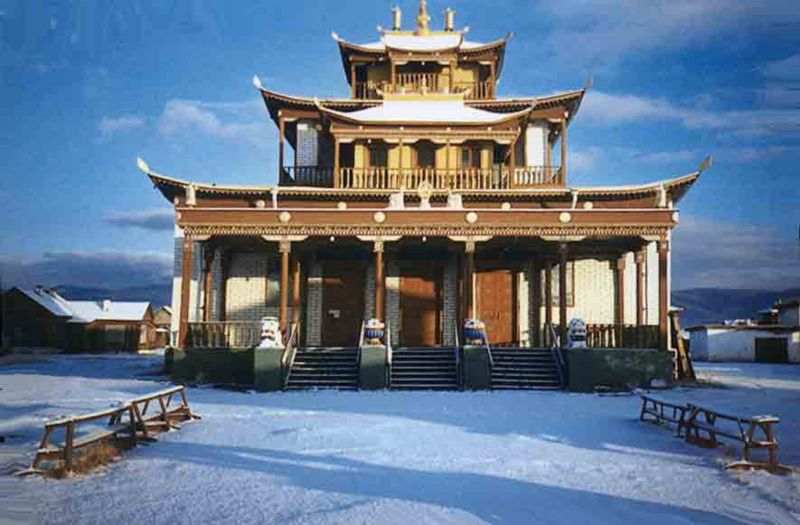
Ivolginsky Datsan

Buddhism is the third-largest religion in Russia, following Christianity and Islam. As of 2025, it was practiced by approximately 1.4 million people (Buddhists), representing about 1.0% of the country’s total population. Buddhism is considered to be one of Russia's traditional religions and is legally a part of Russian historical heritage. Historically, Buddhism was incorporated into Siberia in the early 17th century. Besides the historical monastic traditions of the Buryats, the Kalmyks (Kalmykia the latter being the only Buddhist-majority republic in Europe), the Tuvans, and a part of the Evenki people (in Buryatia), the religion of Buddhism is now spreading all over Russia, with many ethnic Russian converts.

The main form of Buddhism in Russia is Vajrayana, namely the Gelukpa school of Tibetan Buddhism, informally known as the "yellow hat" tradition, with other Tibetan and non-Tibetan schools as minorities. Although Tibetan Buddhism is most often associated with Tibet, it spread into Mongolia. Via Mongolia, Buddhism spread into Siberia before spreading to the rest of Russia.

In the early 20th century, the famous Datsan Gunzechoinei in Saint Petersburg was the northernmost Buddhist temple in Russia.

== History ==
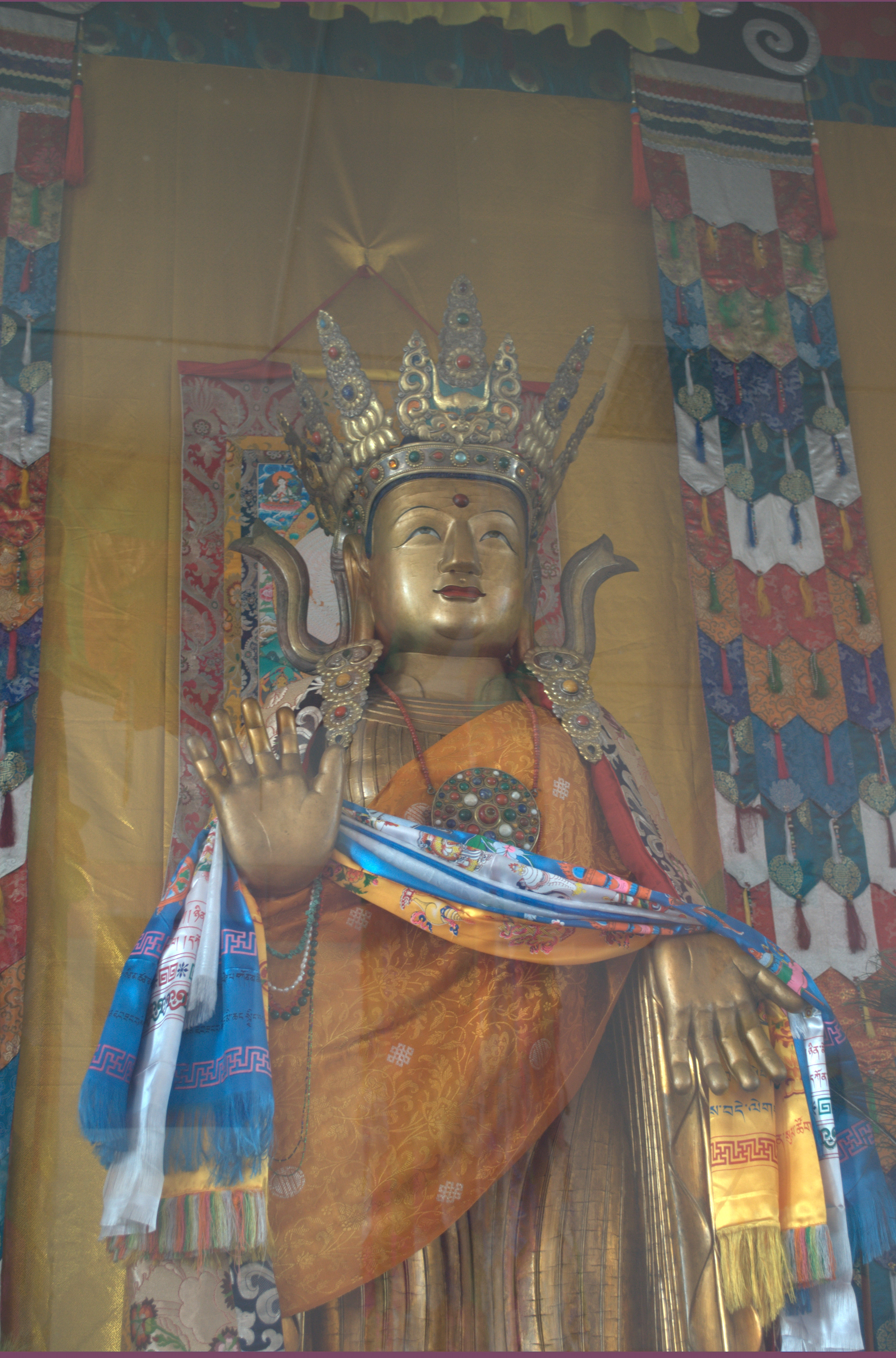
Sandalwood Buddha (Zandan Zhuu) ancient sculpture at Egituysky datsan

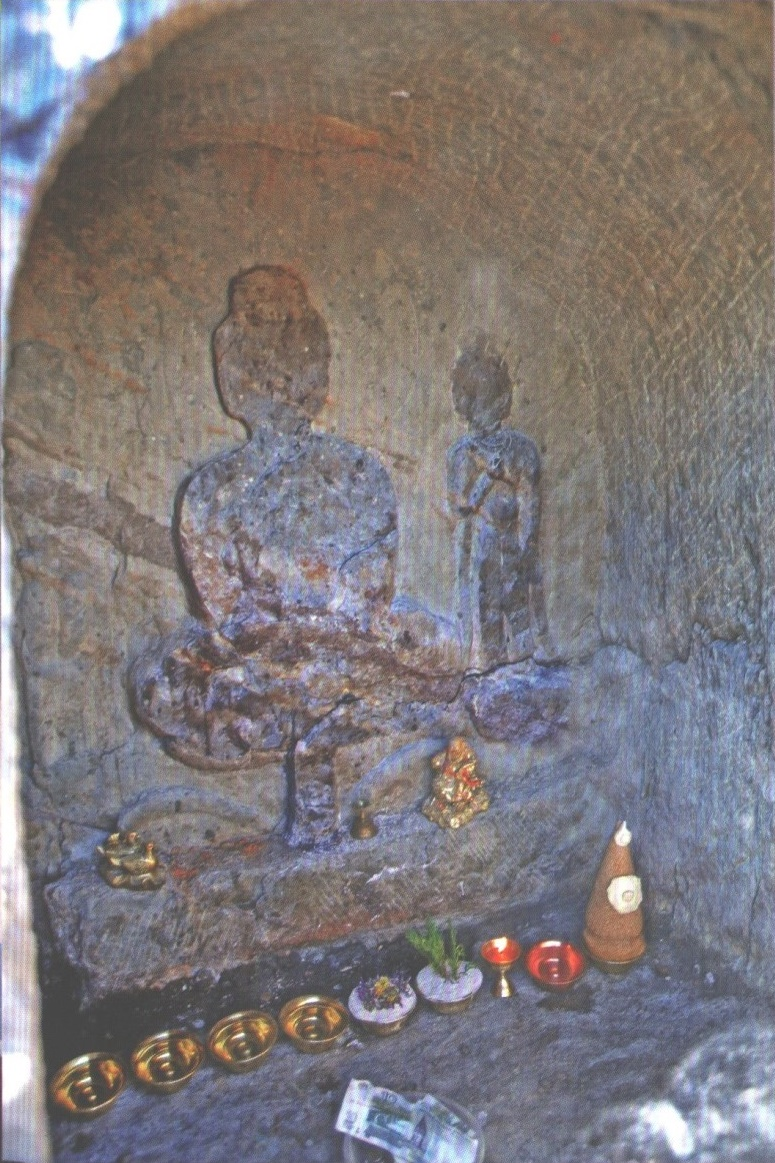
Buddhist niche on Mount Sume-Beli, Tuva, 13th century

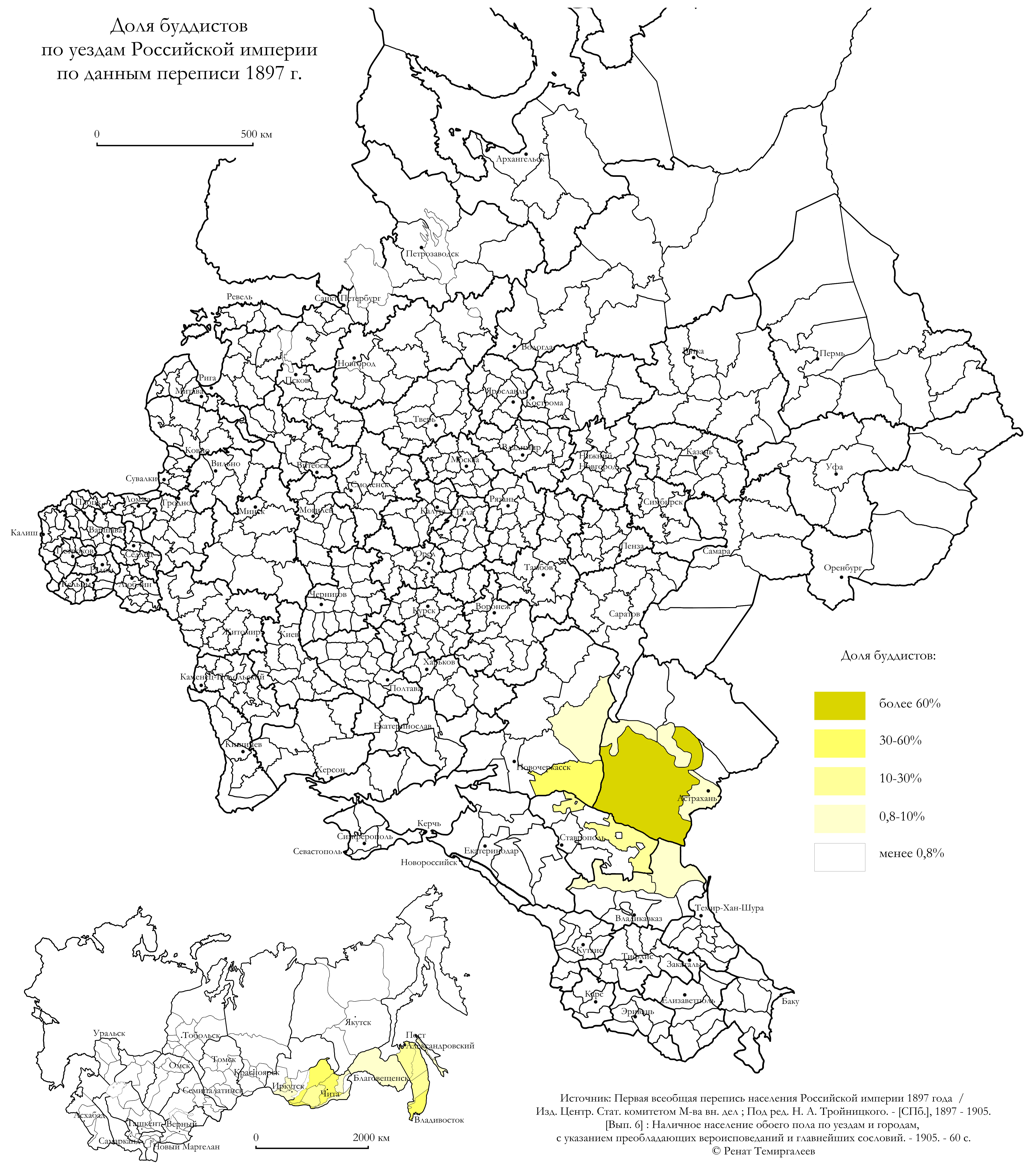
Share of Buddhists by uezds and districts of the Russian Empire, according to the First General Census of 1897

The first evidence of the existence of Buddhism in the territory of modern Russia (more specifically Siberia, the region nearest East Asia) belongs to the 8th century AD and is associated with the state of Balhae; in 698–926, the area occupied part of today's Primorye and Amur. There are also traces of Buddhism during the Jurchen Jin Empire (1115–1234). In the 15th century, during the Chinese Ming dynasty, in the lower reaches of the Amur, "several Buddhist temples were built on the Tyr rock: the Yongning-si temple in honor of the bodhisattva Guan-yin (1413), etc. However, Buddhist preaching did not meet with the support of the Amur residents. The temples were soon destroyed. The Mohe, a people whose culture was greatly influenced by neighboring China, Korea and Manchuria, practiced a form of Mahayana Buddhism. It initially spread into those constituent regions of Russia that are geographically or culturally adjacent to Mongolia (the area known as the Mongolian Steppe) or are inhabited by Mongolian and other ethnic groups: Buryatia, Zabaykalsky Krai, Tuva, and Kalmykia. The last of these was the only Buddhist region in Europe, located to the north of the Caucasus. Indigenous peoples who are associated with Buddhism are the Buryats, the Kalmyks, the Tuvans, and a part of the Evenki people (in Buryatia).

The Tuvans were first exposed to Buddhism during the 13th and 14th centuries, when Tuva entered into the composition of the Mongol Empire. The earliest Buddhist temples uncovered by archaeologists in the territory of Tuva date to the 13th and 14th centuries.

At the beginning of the 17th century, Tibetan Buddhism penetrated northward from Mongolia to reach the Buryat population of Transbaikalia (the area just east of Lake Baikal). Initially, Buddhism disseminated primarily among the Khalka Mongols (the Selenga and Zede Buryats). At the end of the 17th to the beginning of the 18th centuries, it spread throughout the Transbaikal region.

There is a theory that the Oirat Mongols—the ancestors of the Kalmyks—in contrast to the other Mongol groups, came in contact with Buddhism even earlier—as early as the 9th century through neighboring Turkic peoples. Some Kalmyks accepted Russian citizenship in 1609. Sources date the year of adoption of Buddhism by Kalmyks to 1615, when a congress of Oirat princes decided to accept Buddhism and send a large group of young people to study in Tibet. Kalmyks brought Buddhism as their main religion to Russia, becoming the first Buddhist community in Europe. In the autonomous Kalmyk Khanate, Buddhism became the state religion. It kept close ties with Buddhist centers in Tibet and Mongolia until the end of the 18th century. The Tibetan Dalai Lama even appointed the Kalmyk khans.

The 1727 Treaty of Kyakhta that delineated the border between Russia and China also officially acknowledged the presence of Buddhism in Russian-controlled lands for the first time.

In 1741 Empress Elizabeth (Yelizaveta Petrovna) adopted a decree recognizing the existence of a "lamaist faith": She legally recognized the existence of eleven datsans, and with them 150 lamas. Buddhism was formally accepted as an official religion in the Russian Empire.

For a long time in Buryat Buddhism there was a struggle for dominance between the Tsongol and Tamchinsky (Gusinoozyorsk) datsans. In 1764 the chief lama of the Tsongol Datsan became Supreme Lama of the Buryats of Transbaikalia, having received the title Pandit Hambo Lama ("learned prior"). Starting in 1809, supremacy passed to the priors of the Tamchinsky datsan.

By 1887, there were 29 publishing houses and numerous datsans. In 1917, these ethnic regions had among them approximately 20,000 Buddhists and 175 temples.

With the active assistance of leading Buddhologists and the support of the tsarist government, the Buryat lama Agvan Dorzhiev—spiritual mentor and ambassador of the 13th Dalai Lama—built the Datsan Gunzechoinei in St. Petersburg in 1915.

=== Russian encounter with Buddhism ===
From the earliest documented encounters with Buddhism and Buddhists, Russians had mainly negative impressions about the faith and their adherents. Conservative secular Russians and Christians regularly lambasted Buddhism, seeing it as a roadblock to the Christianization and Russification of Siberia. Russian thinkers saw Buddhism as a superstitious but advanced religion espousing the opposite of a rational and scientific worldview. Views of Buddhism for the Russians were molded more by the polemics of Christian missionaries and geopolitics than by the academic world.

When the Cossacks first encountered Buddhism (in its Tibetan form) during their conquest of Siberia, they characterized Buddhism as a form of paganism. Early Russian explorers and Christian missionaries described Tibetan Buddhism as a "superstition", "false creed", or "idolatry" among other similar labels. Russian Christian literature regularly referred to Buddhist temples or monasteries as pagan shrines. Buddhist religious services were denounced as witchcraft, quackery or "shamanic orgies".

Throughout the 19th and early 20th century, Russian researchers began studying Tibetan Buddhism. However, because of Orientalism and the frequent Christian or missionary background of the scholars, their works are not considered academic in modern times, with many scholars of the time assuming that Buddhism was defective and utilizing little textual material to enforce their biases. With the advent of Buddhist studies in western Europe in the 19th century, Russian society was similarly exposed to the idea that Buddhism contained an impressive philosophy and history. However, Russian elites and academics saw true Buddhism a religion of the past or existing in certain regions like Sri Lanka. Siberian Buddhism was seen as backward throughout the 19th and early 20th century. In the late 19th century and early 20th century, parts of Russian society began having positive views of Tibetan Buddhism but advocating for the Europeanization of Buddhism and closer incorporation of Buddhists in an effort to "civilize" them.

=== Soviet Age ===
When the Soviet Union came into being, all religions including Buddhism began to be viewed as "tools of oppression", and Buddhists in positions of authority were looked upon unfavourably. The USSR sought to remove Buddhism and other religions, as they believed that a lack of religion combined with urbanization would result in an increase in production. In 1929, many monasteries were closed down and monks were arrested and exiled. By the 1930s, during the Stalinist repressions, Buddhists were suffering more than any other religious community in the Soviet Union with lamas being expelled and accused of being "Japanese spies" and "the people's enemies". In 1943, all Kalmykians were forcibly exiled to Siberia due to government suspicions that they were collaborating with Nazi Germany when it had occupied part of Kalmykia. About 40% of the Kalmykian population died while in exile and those who did survive were not able to return to their homeland until 1956.

However, Buddhism did not disappear from Russia as a result of the efforts of Bidia Dandaron, a follower of Tsydenov and a famous Buddhologist and thinker. Dandaron attempted to revive Buddhism in the atheist state by introducing the concept of Neo-Buddhism, a combination of Buddhist teachings and contemporary Western philosophy with scientific theories. Dandaron was later arrested for creating a religious community and eventually died in a prison camp. Nevertheless, his disciples played a key role in the 1990s with the revival of Russian Buddhism.

=== Post-Soviet Revival ===
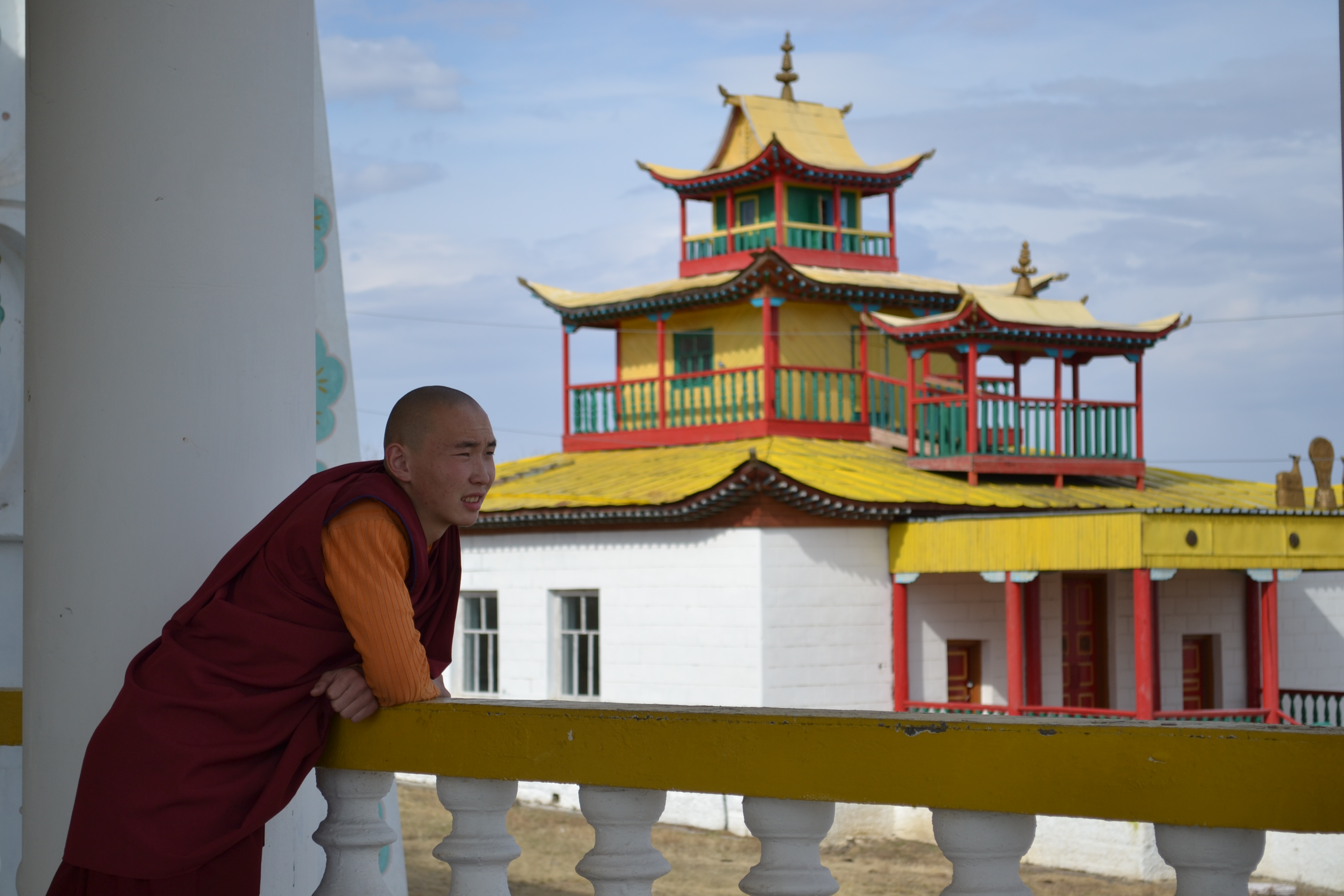
Buryat monk at Gegetuy Datsan

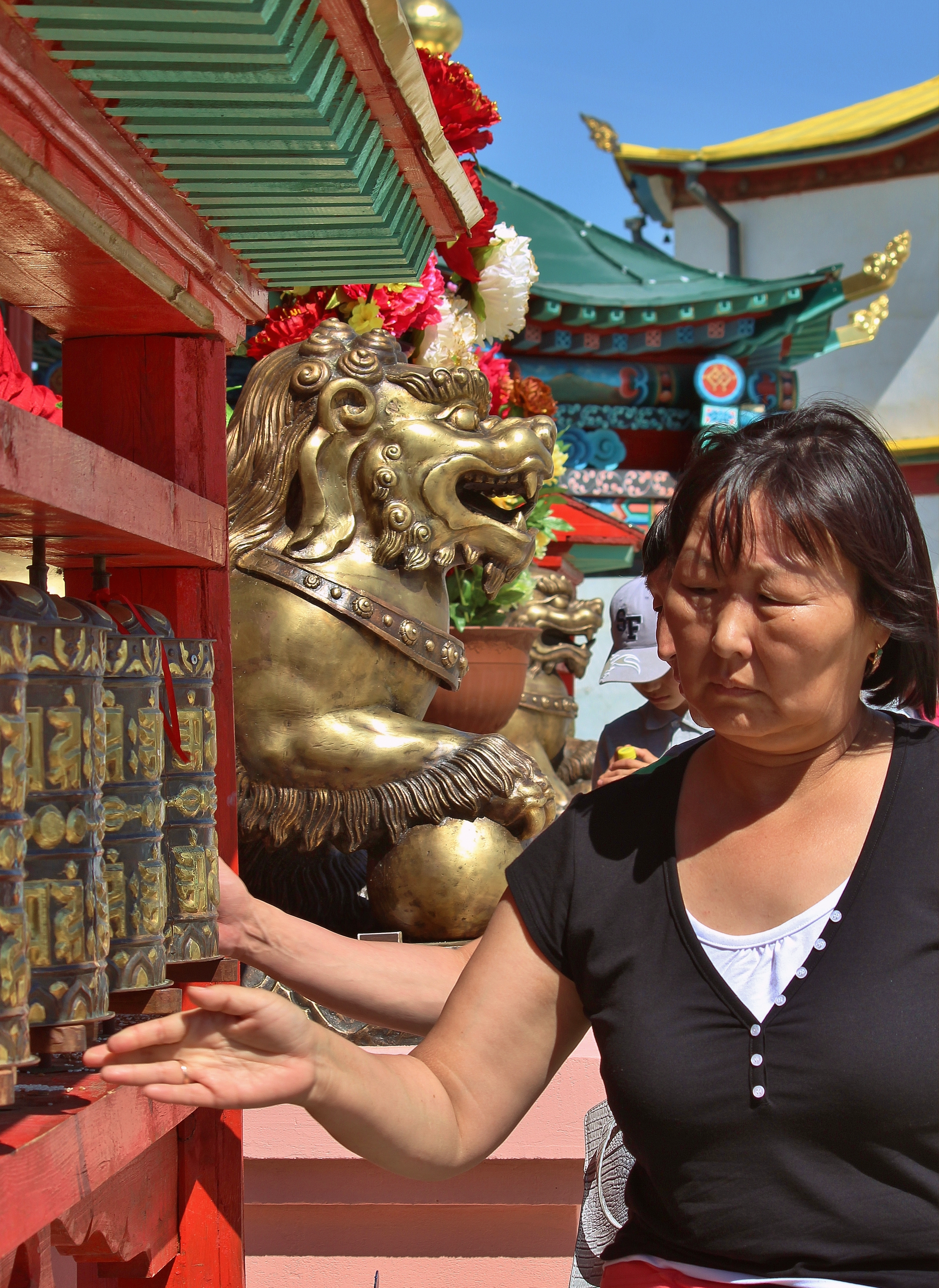
At Ivolginsky Datsan

After the fall of the Soviet Union, a Buddhist revival began in Kalmykia with the election of President Kirsan Ilyumzhinov. It was also revived in Buryatia and Tuva and began to spread to Russians in other regions.

In 1992, the Dalai Lama made his first visit to Tuva in Russia.

Fyodor Shcherbatskoy, a renowned Russian Indologist who traveled to India and Mongolia during the time of the Russian Empire, is widely considered by many to be responsible for laying the foundations for the study of Buddhism in the Western world.

There are a number of reestablished and new temples known as khuruls and datsans.

There are now between 700,000 and 1.5 million Buddhists in Russia, mainly in the republics of Buryatia, Kalmykia and Tuva.

In 2022, Khambo Lama Damba Ayusheev, the head of the Buddhist Traditional Sangha of Russia (BTSR), the largest Buddhist denomination in Russia, voiced support for the Russian invasion of Ukraine. In October 2022, Erdne Ombadykov, the Supreme Lama of Russia's Republic of Kalmykia, condemned the Russian invasion of Ukraine and fled Russia to Mongolia. In January 2023, he was recognized in Russia as a foreign agent.

In 2023, the largest 12-story Buddhist monastery in Russia, Thubten Shedrub Ling, opened in Kyzyl, built on the initiative of Defense Minister Sergei Shoigu.

In 2024, a Russian stupa was built in the holy place of Lumbini in Nepal.

== Demographics ==
In 2025, the Russian Public Opinion Research Center (VCIOM) found that 1% of Russians identified as Buddhists.

=== Regions with large Buddhist populations ===
Federal subject	Buddhists (2012)	Buddhists (2016)
Tuva	61.8%	52.2%
Kalmykia	47.6%	53.4%
Buryatia	19.8%	19.8%
Zabaykalsky Krai	6.3%	14.6%
Russian Federation	0.5%	0.6%

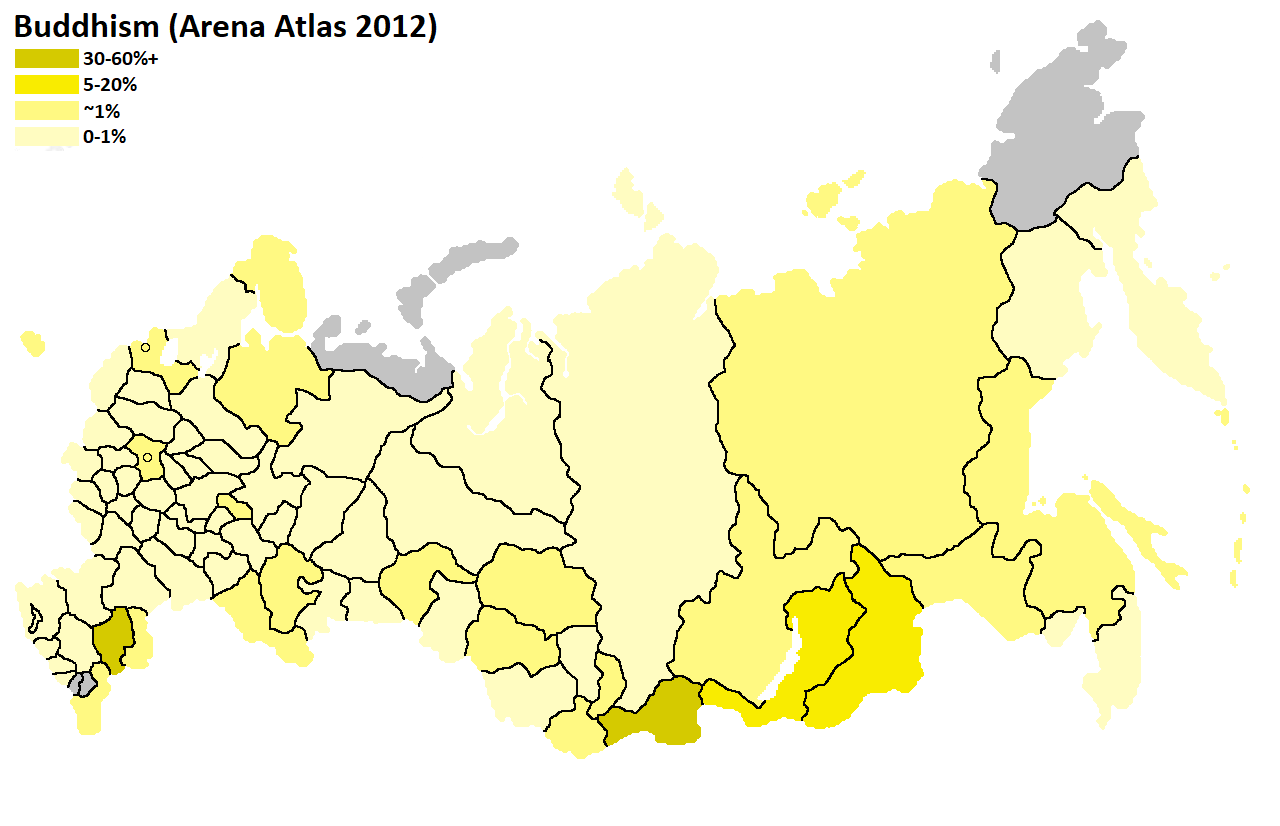
Buddhism in Russia

In 2012, Buddhism was the religion of 62% of the total population of Tuva, 48% of Kalmykia and 20% of Buryatia. Buddhism also has believers amounting to 6% in Zabaykalsky Krai (primarily ethnic Buryats, having a special Agin-Buryat Okrug), and 0.5% to 0.9% in Tomsk Oblast and Yakutia. Buddhist communities may be found in other federal subjects of Russia, between 0.1% and 0.5% in Irkutsk Oblast (primarily Buryats, having a special Ust-Orda Buryat Okrug), Sakhalin Oblast, Khabarovsk Krai, Amur Oblast, Altai, Khakassia, Novosibirsk Oblast, Tomsk Oblast, Tyumen Oblast, Orenburg Oblast, Arkhangelsk Oblast, Murmansk Oblast, Moscow and Moscow Oblast, Saint Petersburg and Leningrad Oblast, and in Kaliningrad Oblast. In cities like Moscow, Saint Petersburg and Samara, often up to 1% of the population identify as Buddhists.

== Temples and monasteries ==
Traditional types of Buddhist temples and monasteries in Russia are dugans (sume), khuruls (khure), datsans, and kiids (see List of Buddhist temples and monasteries in Russia).

As nomadic cattle breeders, the Kalmyks and Buryats initially erected temple yurts and had mobile monasteries consisting of several tents.

The first wooden and stone Buddhist temples were built with the participation of Russian masons and carpenters, with the influence of the traditions of Russian church architecture. The buildings were cruciform in plan and many-headed. The vestibule is a distinctive feature of the temples in Russia. It is designed to cut off cold air.

Since the second half of the 19th century, temples in plan close to a square have been constructed in the form of a stepped pyramid with a Chinese-type roof with curved corners.

Construction of the Datsan Gunzechoinei in Saint Petersburg was completed by 1915 and became the first large Buddhist temple in the West.

The 2014 Yakutsk Datsan is the only northernmost Tibetan Buddhist temple in Russia.

In 2023, the largest 12-story Buddhist monastery in Russia, Thubten Shedrub Ling, opened in Kyzyl.

The Buddhist Tubden Shedubling temple complex will be located in Moscow near the existing Orthodox Church with a chapel, the Muslim mosques, and the Jewish synagogue, as part of the Spiritual and educational complex of Russian traditional religions.

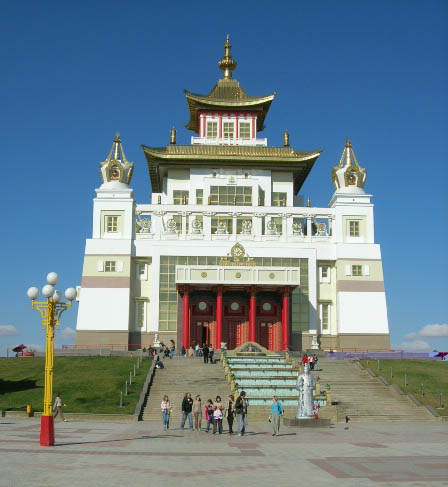
Burkhan Bakshin Altan Sume

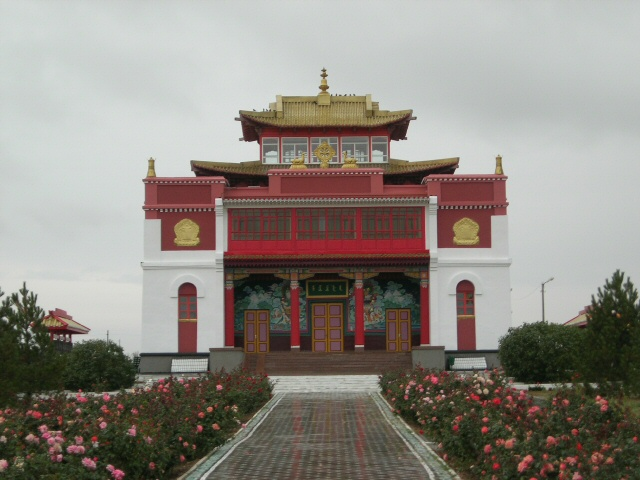
Geden Sheddup Choikorling

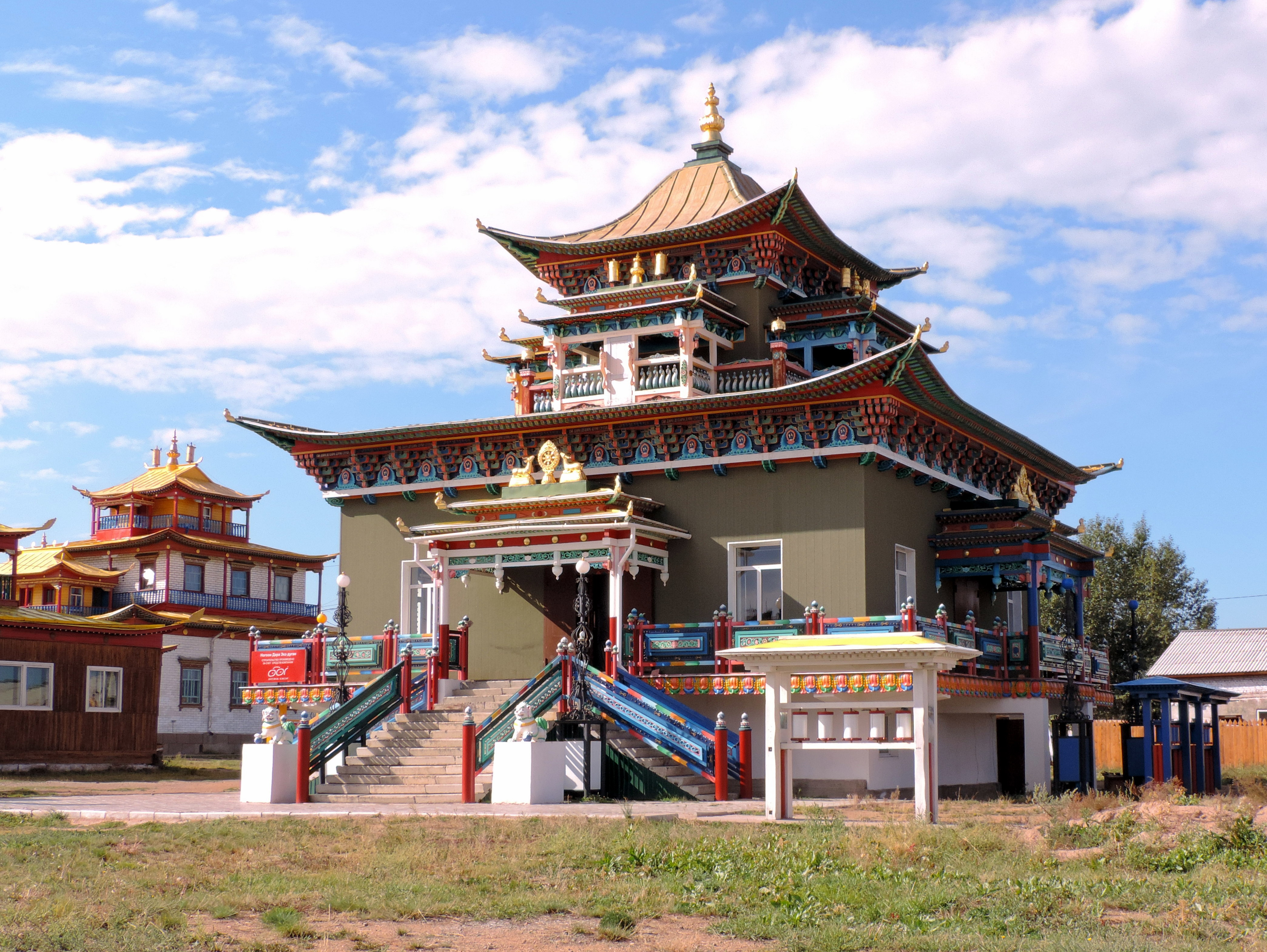
Ivolginsky Datsan

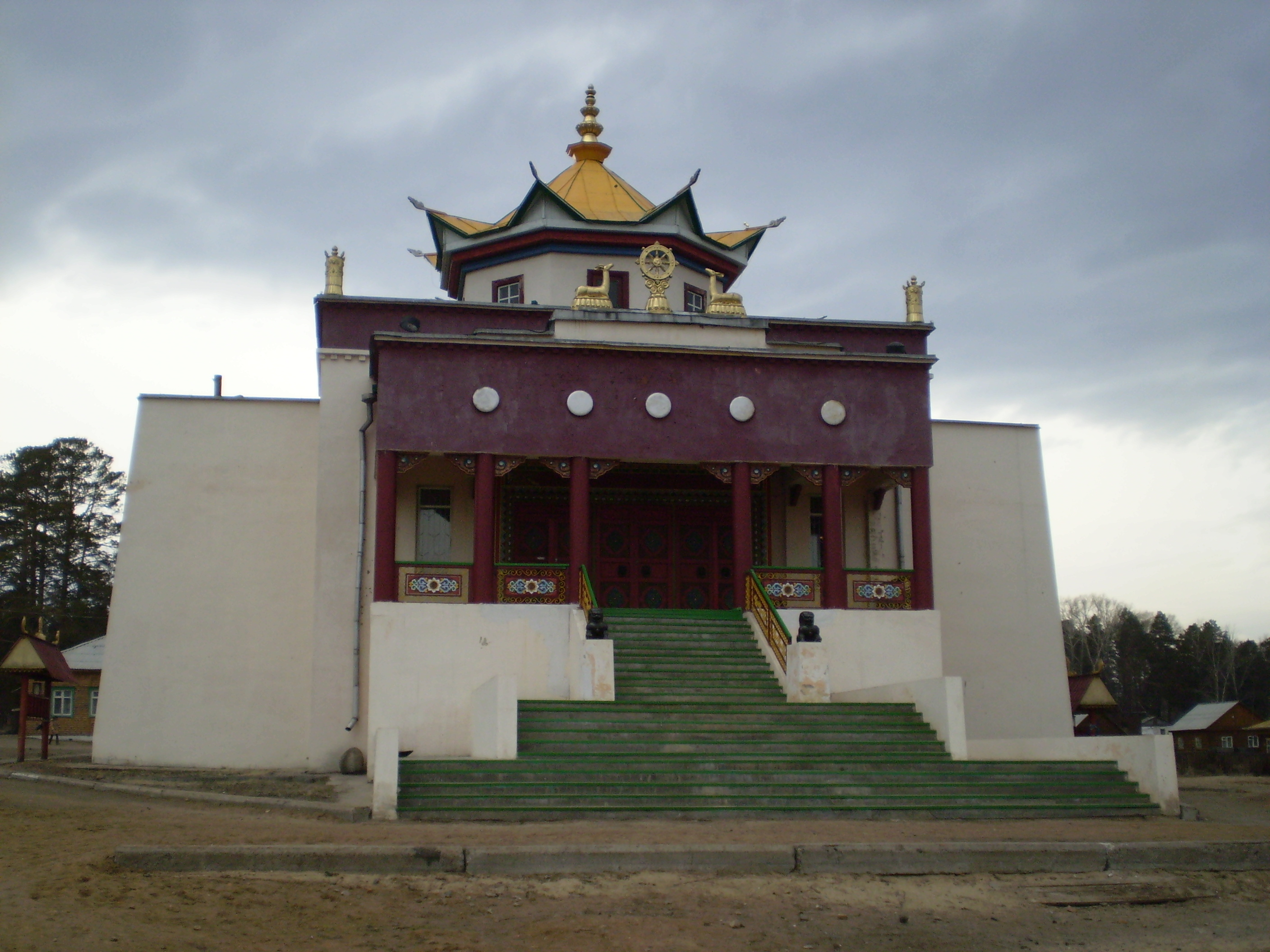
Hambyn-Hure Datsan, Ulan-Ude

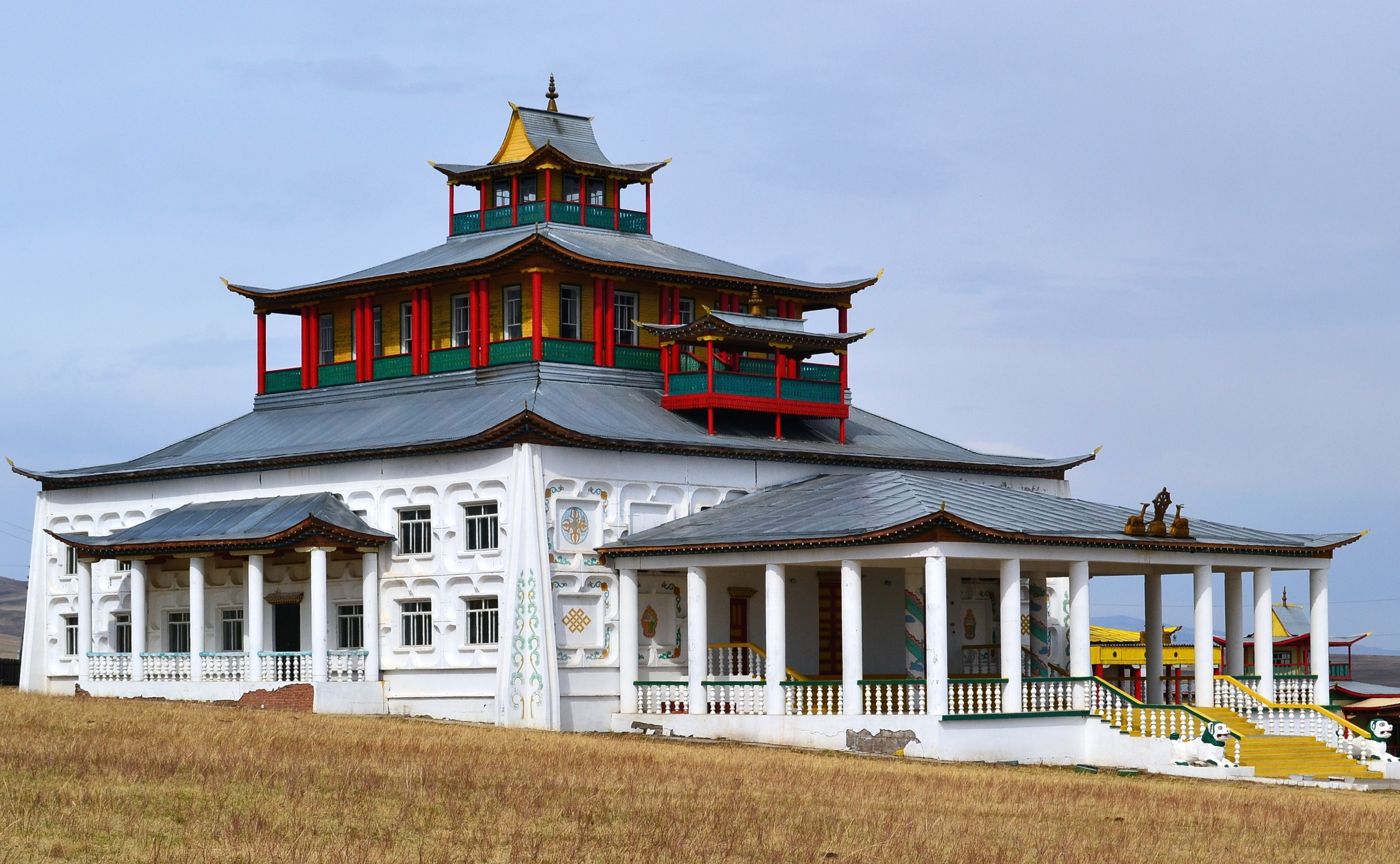
Gegetuy Datsan

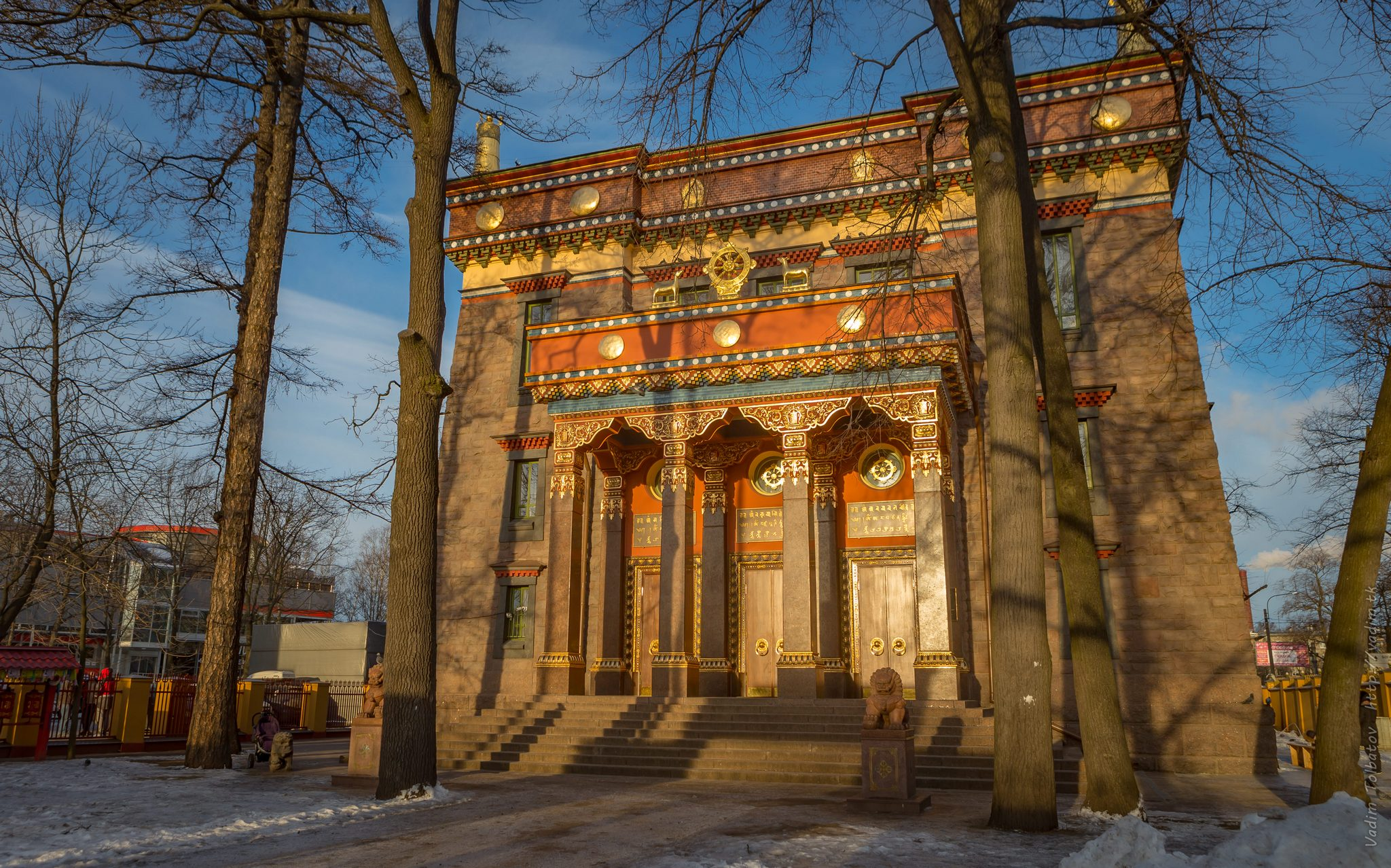
Datsan Gunzechoinei

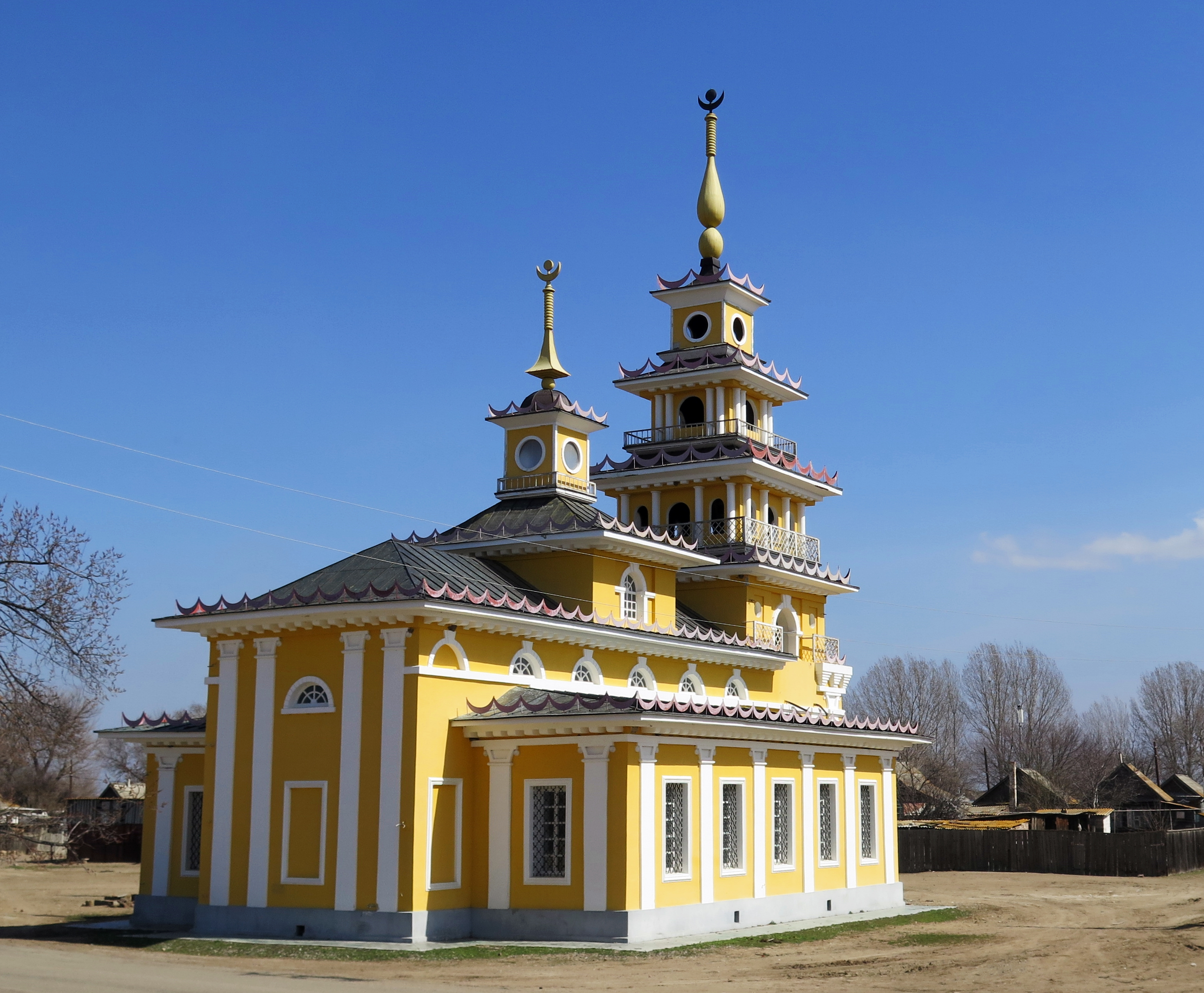
Khosheutovsky Khurul

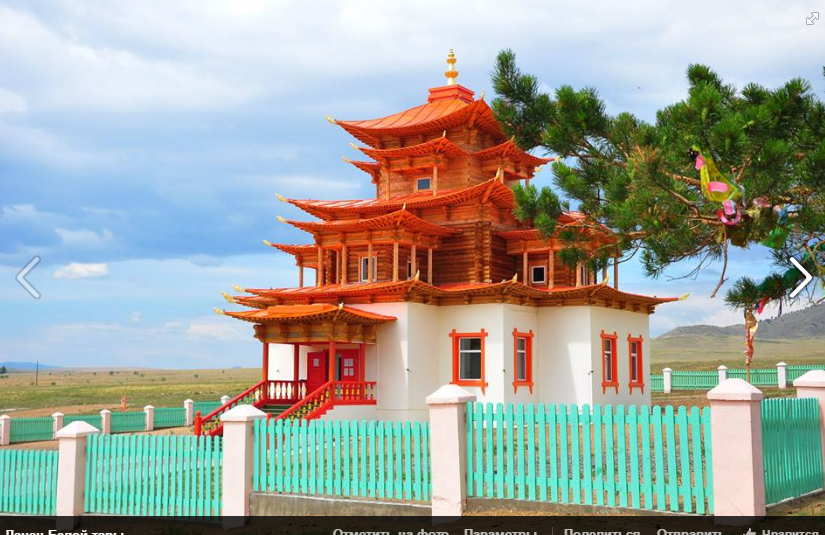
Atsaysky Datsan

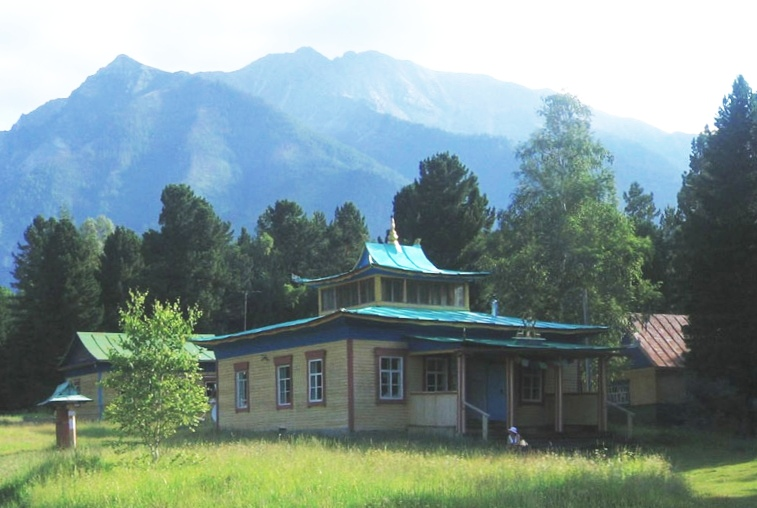
Khoymorsky Datsan

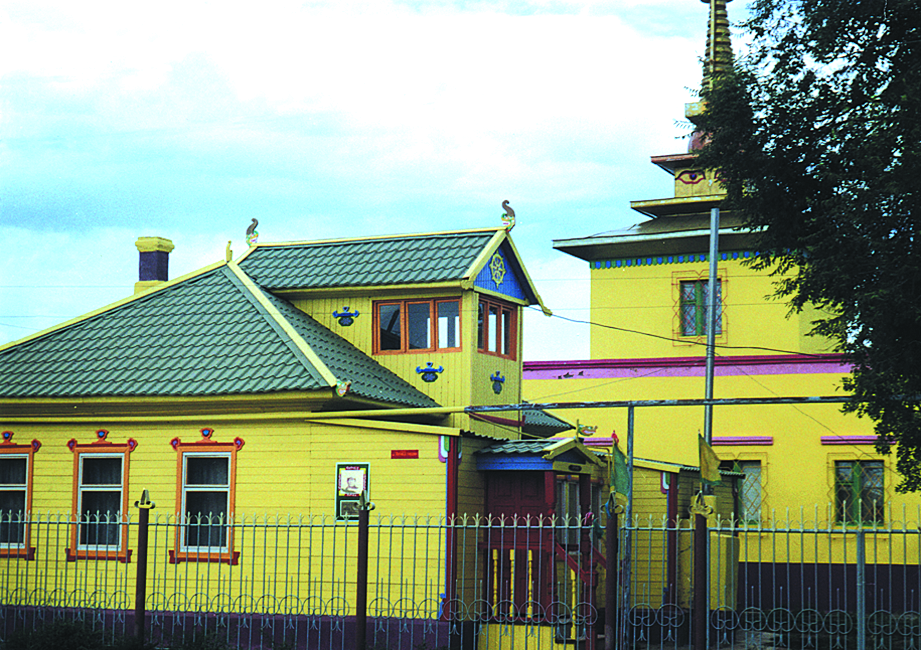
Tsagan Aman Khurul

== See also ==
- Buddhism in Buryatia
- Buddhism in Kalmykia
- Buddhism in Tuva

== Bibliography ==
- Bernstein, Anna (2002). "Buddhist Revival in Buriatia: Recent Perspectives". Mongolian Studies. 25: 1–11. ISSN 0190-3667. JSTOR 43193334.
- Filatov, Sergei; Lunkin, Roman (2006). "Statistics on Religion in Russia: The Reality Behind the Figures" (PDF). Religion, State & Society. 34 (1). Routledge. doi:10.1080/09637490500459875. ISSN 0963-7494. S2CID 257032. Archived from the original (PDF) on 2018-04-25.
- Gazizova, Valeriya (2017). "Buddhism in Contemporary Kalmykia. 'Pure' Monasticism versus Challenges of Post-Soviet Modernity". In Havnevik, Hanna; Hüsken, Ute; Teeuwen, Mark; Tikhonov, Vladimir; Wellens, Koen (eds.). Buddhist Modernities: Re-inventing Tradition in the Globalizing Modern World. Part 2: Revivals and Neo-Traditionalist Inventions. Routledge studies in religion. New York; London: Routledge. ISBN 9781315542140.
- Holland, Edward C. (Dec 2014). "Buddhism in Russia: challenges and choices in the post-Soviet period". Religion, State and Society. 42 (4): 389–402. doi:10.1080/09637494.2014.980603. S2CID 145460994.
- Juergensmeyer, Mark (2006). The Oxford Handbook of Global Religions. Oxford University Press, USA. pp. 309–310. ISBN 978-0-19-972761-2.
- Terentyev, Andrey (1996). "Tibetan Buddhism in Russia". The Tibet Journal. 21 (3): 60–70. ISSN 0970-5368. JSTOR 43300586.
- Terentʹev, Andrej (2014). Buddizm v Rossii - carskoj i sovetskoj: starye fotografii=Buddhism in Russia - Tsarist and Soviet: old photographs. Sankt-Peterburg: A. Terentʹev. ISBN 978-5-901941-39-3.
- Ulanov, Mergen; Badmaev, Valeriy and Holland, Edward (2017). "Buddhism and Kalmyk Secular Law in the Seventeenth to Nineteenth Centuries", Inner Asia 19(2), 297–314
- Zhukovskaia, Natalia L. (2001-04-01). "Lamaism in Tuva". Anthropology & Archeology of Eurasia. 39 (4): 48–. doi:10.2753/AAE1061-1959390448. ISSN 1061-1959. S2CID 144636457.
