= Central Spiritual Board of Buddhists of the USSR =

Authorized organization for Tibetan Buddhists in the USSR

- Центральное духовное управление буддистов СССР
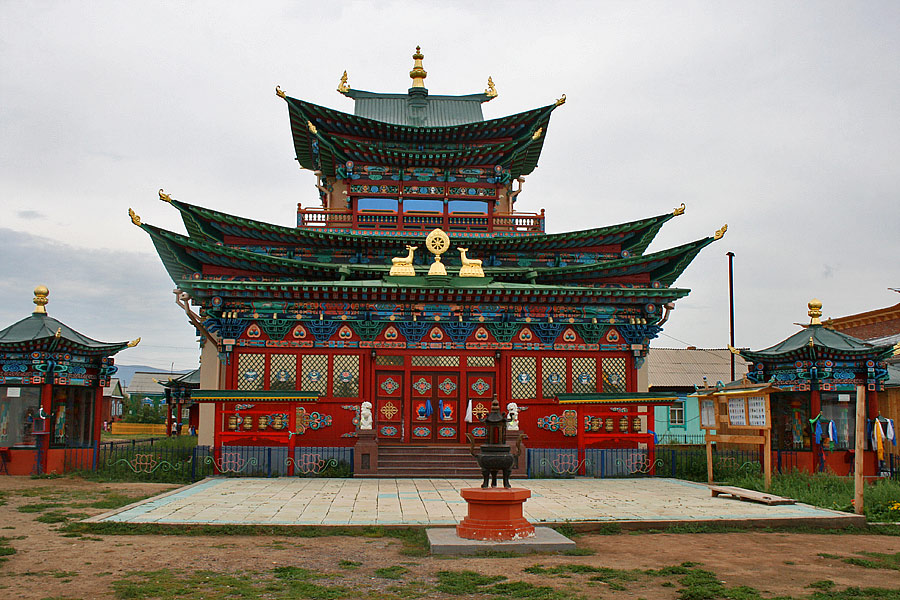
- Ivolginsky Datsan, Buryatia, Russia
- Successor: Buddhist Traditional Sangha of Russia (in Russia)
- Formation: May 21, 1946
- Dissolved: 1992; 34 years ago
- Headquarters: Moscow

The Central Spiritual Board of Buddhists of the USSR (Russian: Центральное духовное управление буддистов СССР, known in its acronym TsDUB, ЦДУБ) was the authorized organization for Tibetan Buddhists in the Soviet Union. The headquarters of the organization were located in the Verkhnyaya Ivolga, Buryat ASSR.

== History ==
The organization was founded at a congress of Buddhist believers on 21–23 May 1946 in Ulan-Ude, Buryat-Mongol ASSR. Their "Law of Spiritual Administration of Buddhists and a Regulation for Buddhist Clergy of the USSR", making it imperative for Buddhists to honor the worker's fatherland and put its interests on par with their faith.

The chairman of the new organization was given the title Bandido Khambo Lama, and the headquarters was at a new temple, Ivolginsky datsan located in Verkhnyaya Ivolga, near Ulan-Ude, Khambin sume. Soon a second temple was built, the Agin datsan in Chita. A permanent office was established in Moscow, which mainly dealt with external relations.

A congress of clergy and laity met quadrennially to elect members of the Board.

TsDUB joined the International Brotherhood of Buddhists in 1956 and the Asian Buddhist Conference for Peace in 1969. The latter was an organization of Buddhists from Soviet dominated countries.

With the collapse of the Soviet Union, the Central Spiritual Administration of Buddhists of the USSR re-registered as the Central Spiritual Administration of Buddhists of the Russian Federation. After the death of Pandito Khambo, Lama Munko Tsybikov in 1992, the Central Spiritual Administration of Buddhists lost stability and control over a number of datsans and began to split into separate structures. Between 1992 and 1995, the head of the Central Spiritual Administration of Buddhists changed three times. In 1995, Damba Ayusheev became the head of the Central Spiritual Administration of Buddhists. During the initial period of his work, the new head of the Central Spiritual Administration of Buddhists achieved full administrative and financial control over a number of datsans, which became one of the main reasons for the strengthening of the organization's influence on Buddhism in Russia. In 1997, at the congress of the Central Buddhist Buddhist Society of the Russian Federation, on the initiative of Ayusheev, a decision was made to rename the organization to the Buddhist Traditional Sangha of Russia; in 1999, a new charter was approved, the constituent documents were updated and the succession from the Central Buddhist Society of the Russian Federation was confirmed. In addition to the BTSR, other Buddhist organizations emerged, reflecting the interests of the Buddhist communities of Buryatia, Kalmykia and other regions, as well as numerous Buddhist communities of various trends in industrial and university cities of the CIS.

== Leaders ==
Chairmen of this group held the title Bandido Khambo-Lama. This post was held by the following:

- L.N. Darmaev (1946-1956)
- Eshi Dorzhi Sharapov (1956-1963)
- Zhambal Gomboev (1963-1983)
- Munko Tsybikov

== See also ==
- Buddhist Sangha of Vietnam
- Buddhist Association of China
- Korea Buddhists Federation
- Spiritual Administration of the Muslims of Central Asia and Kazakhstan
