= Ivolginsky Datsan =

Buddhist temple in Buryatia, Russia

Coordinates: 51°45′30″N 107°12′12″E

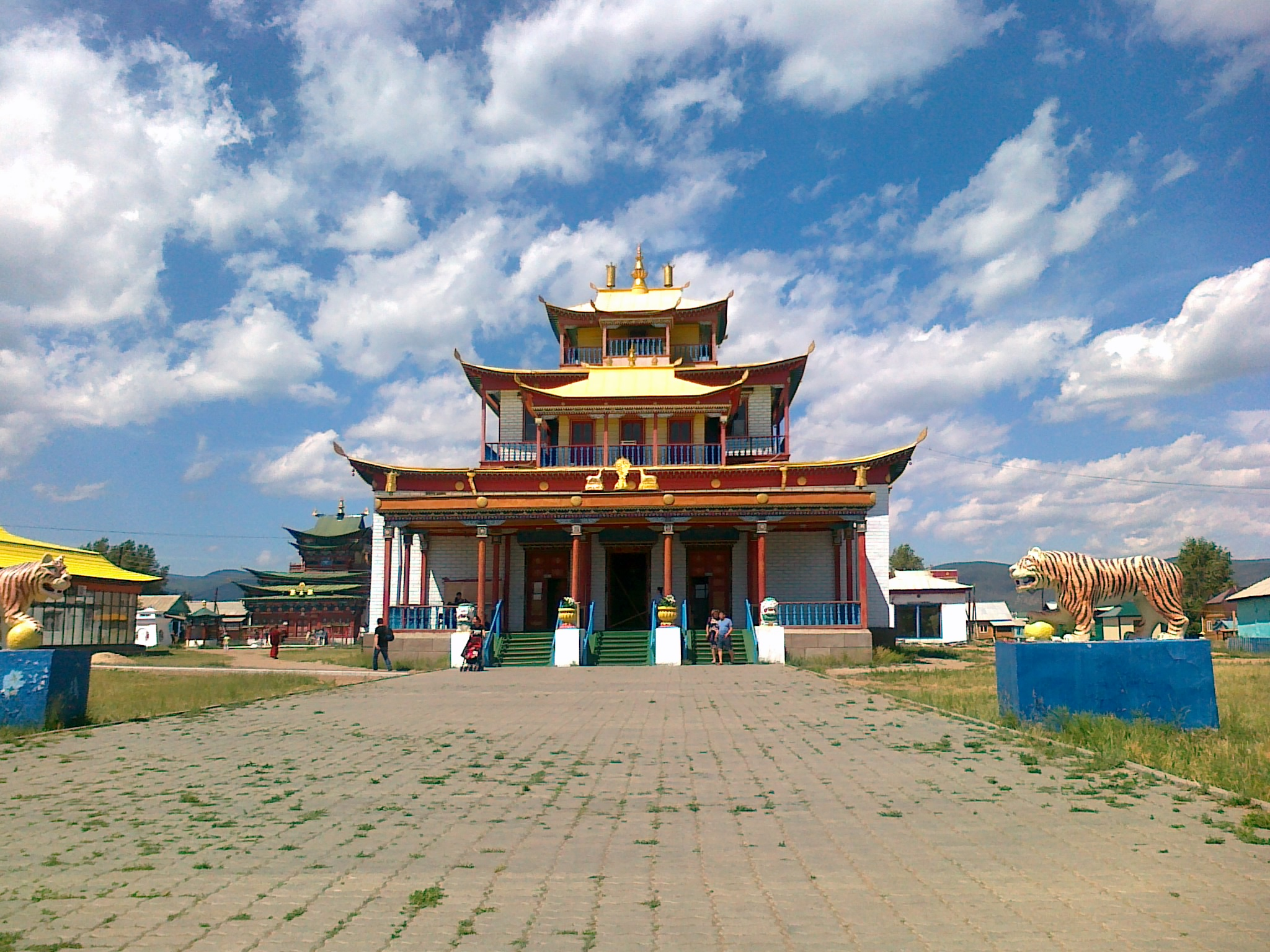
Tsogchen-dugan. The main cathedral temple of the Ivolginsky datsan

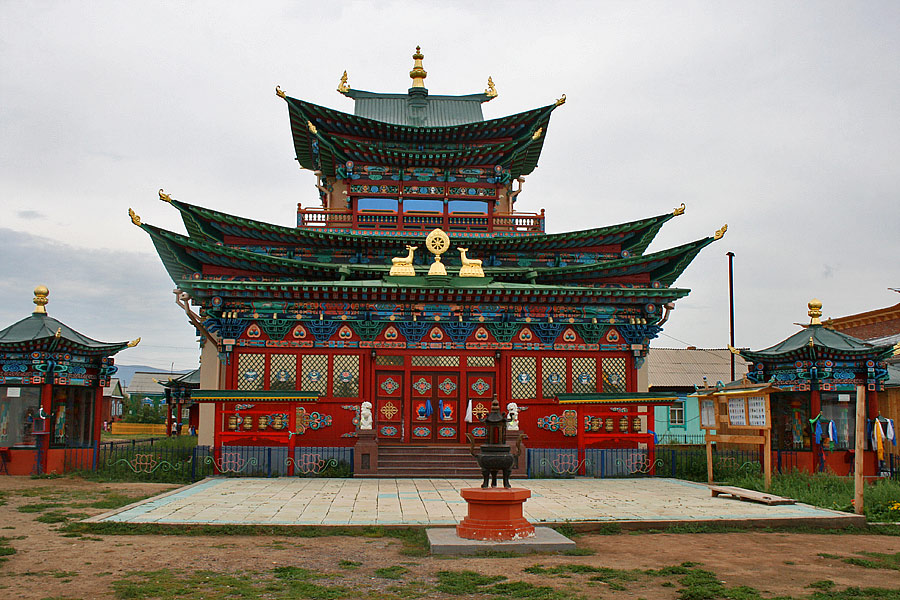
Ivolga Monastery - Etigel Khambin Temple.

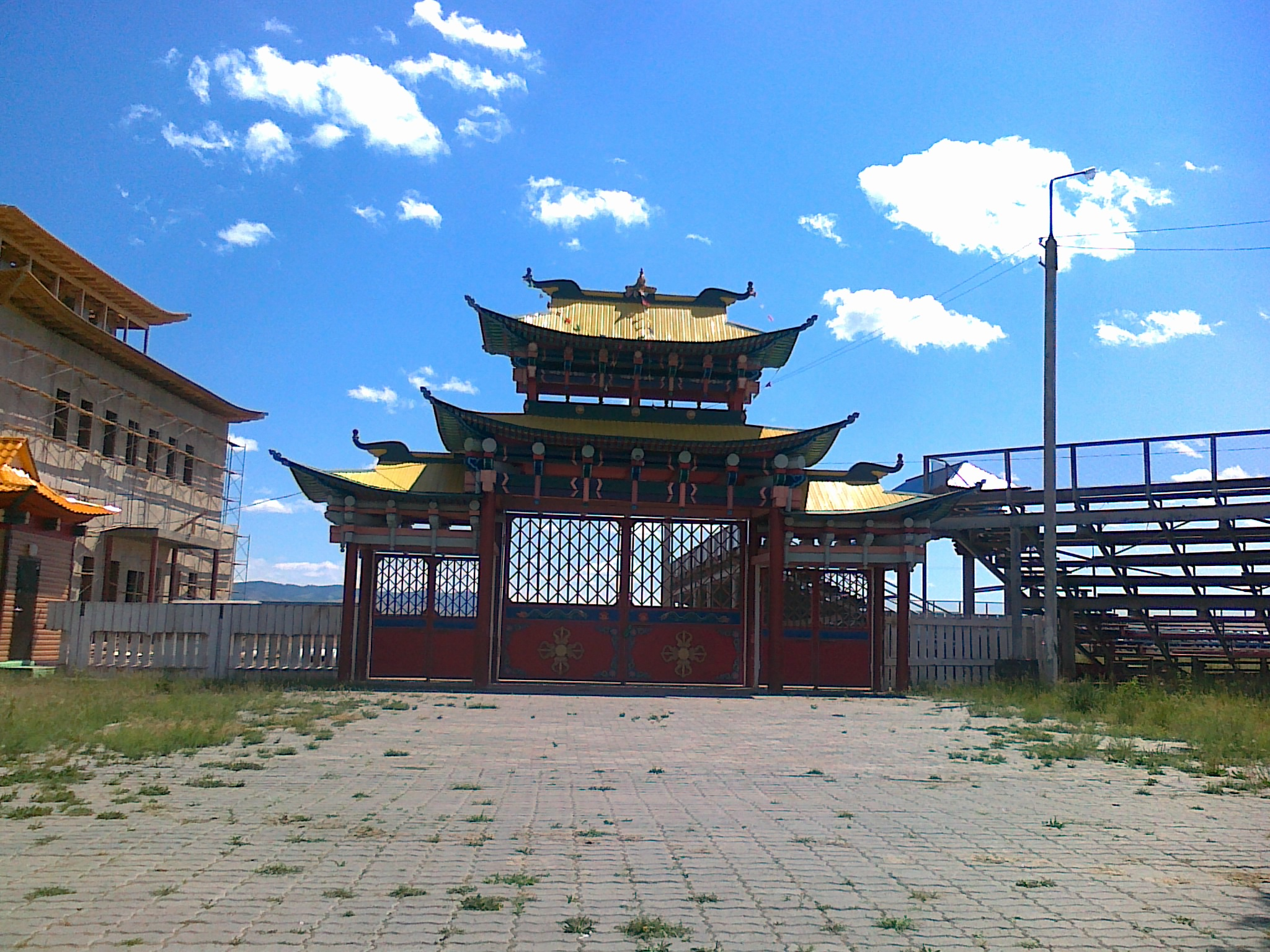
The main gate of the Ivolginsky datsan. Inside view

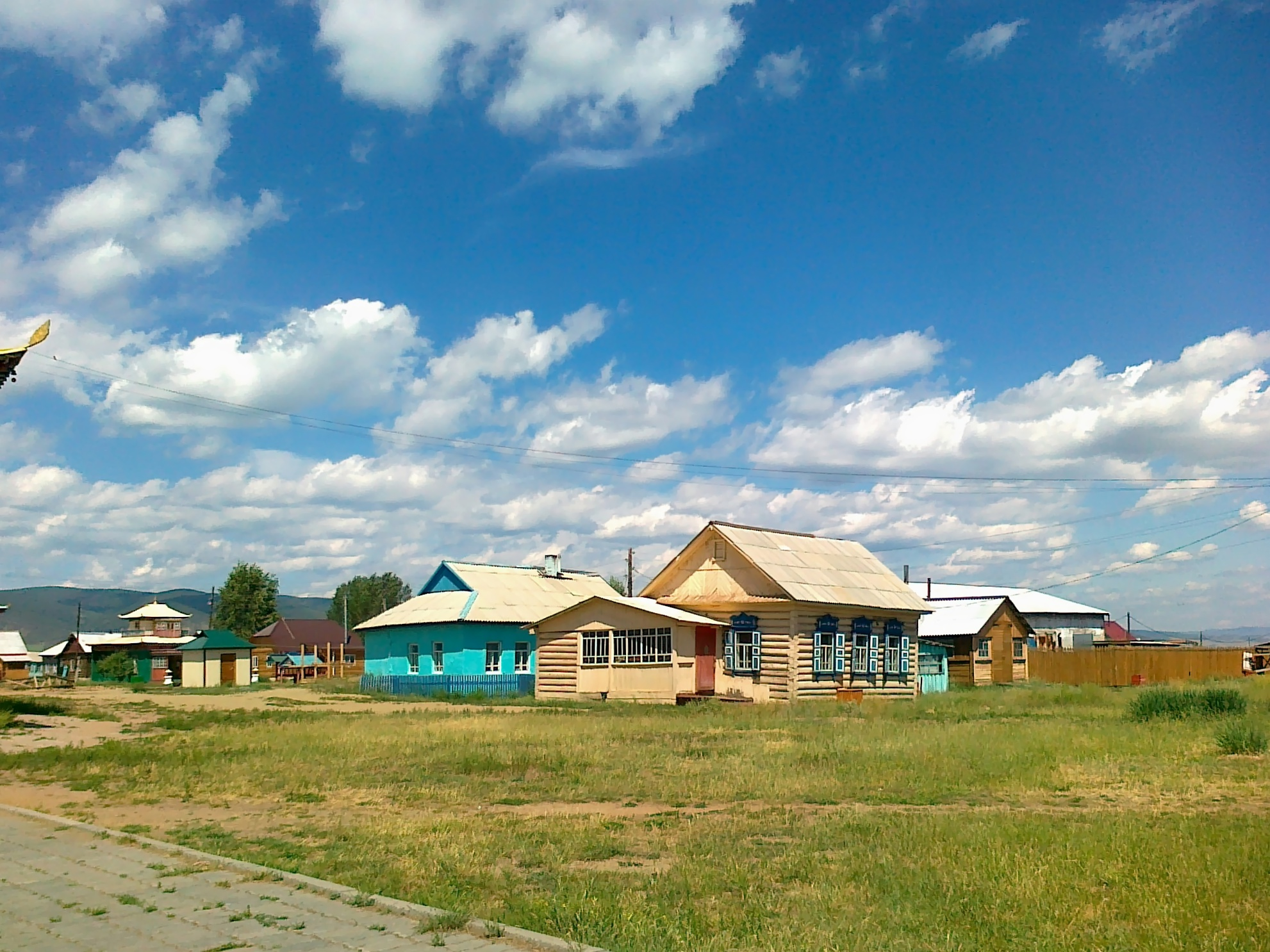
Residential houses of priests of the datsan

Ivolginsky Datsan (Russian: Иволгинский дацан) is the center of the Buddhist Traditional Sangha of Russia. It is a Buddhist temple located in Buryatia, Russia, 23 km from Ulan-Ude, near Verkhnyaya Ivolga village.

The spiritual activity of the datsan is manifested in temple rites, medical practice, and a traditional system of Buddhist education.

== History ==
The datsan opened in 1945 as the only Buddhist spiritual centre of the USSR. Its name was changed from Khambin Sume (Хамбинское Сумэ) to the Monastic Centre (Средняя Иволга).

It was the residence of the Central Spiritual Board of Buddhists of the USSR and later of the Buddhist Traditional Sangha of Russia, as well as that of Pandido Khambo lama, the head of the Russian Buddhists. The Dashi Choinkhorling Buddhist university was opened in 1991 attached to the datsan.

== Culture ==
Although built in the late 1940s with light-colored brick, the [main] temple displays traditional proportions and ornamentation. The first level is devoted to study and prayer. The second level preserves sacred texts. The third level, the gonkan, serves as an inner sanctum devoted to the guardian deities. The gonkan is surrounded by an open gallery to allow ceremonial processions around the sacred space.

Unique samples of Buryat art, as thangkas, sculptures, and ritual objects are gathered and preserved at the datsan. Among the monastery's treasures is a collection of Buddhist manuscripts written in Tibetan language on silk, and a greenhouse with a sacred Bodhi tree.

As a cultural and religious monument, the datsan is protected by the State. The Datsan Centre consists of such temples as Sockshin-dugan, Maidrin-sume, Devazhin and Sakhiusan-sume. A library, hotel, the Choyra (Faculty of Philosophy), Dashi Choinhorlin (building of the Buddhist University), Museum of Buryat Art, suburgans (stupas), are available.

Within the complex is the Korean style wooden Etigel Khambin temple that honors the 12th Khambo Lama whose body was recently exhumed.

== Itigelov ==
In 1927, the 12th Pandito Hambo Lama of the Dashi-Dorzho Itigelov, told his students and fellow monks to bury his body after his death and to check on it in 30 years. According to the story, Itigelov then sat in the lotus position, began chanting the prayer of death, and died, mid-meditation. The monks followed Itigilov's directions, and when they exhumed his body 30 years later, they were amazed to find no sign of decay and decomposition. Fearful of the Soviet response to the "religious miracle", the monks reburied Itigilov's body in an unmarked grave; packing the wooden coffin with salt.

Itigelov's story was not forgotten; a young lama named Bimba Dorzhiyez Buddhist whose father-in-law had witnessed the original exhumation. On September 11, 2002, the body was again exhumed, a process witnessed by twelve people, including two forensic scientists and a photographer. The official statement was issued about the body stated that it was well preserved, without major signs of decay.

== Museum of the History of the Ivolginsky Datsan ==
On 17 September 2019 the Museum of the History of the Center of Traditional Russian Buddhism opened. The project was implemented thanks to a presidential grant in cooperation with the National Museum of Buryatia. The museum has a unique exposition about the history of Buddhism since its arrival in Russia.

== See also ==
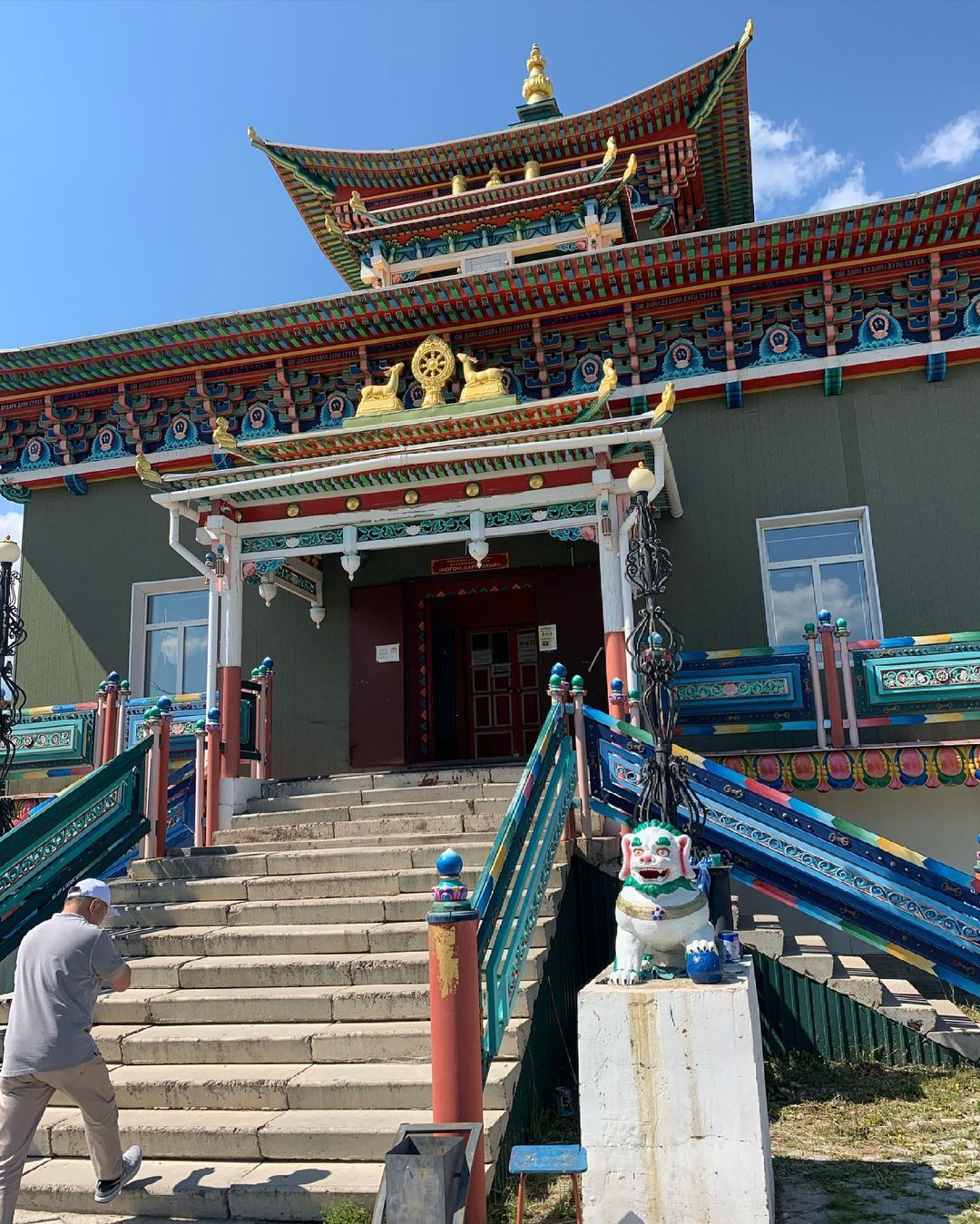
One of the dugans of the Ivolginsky Datsan. July 2021

- Buddhist monasteries in Russia
- Buddhism in the Russian Federation
