= Natalia Zhukovskaia =

Natalia L’vovna Zhukovskaia (Наталья Львовна Жуковская) is one of the foremost scholars working on Buryat, Mongols as well as other Mongolic peoples history, culture, and religious life.

== Biography ==
Professor Zhukovskaya completed graduate work at Moscow State University (МГУ) in the History Faculty in 1961. After graduating, she began work at the Institute for Ethnology and Anthropology of the Russian Academy of Sciences (РАН), the most prestigious academic institute in the Soviet Union. In 1996, she became the head of the Division of Asian and Pacific Oceanic Research (Отдел азиатских и тихоокеанских исследований). From 1957 to 2004, she led no less than forty five expeditions to Mongolia and Buryatia to conduct fieldwork. She has authored or co-authored more than 230 scholarly works, including at least 12 books.

Dr. Zhukovskaya's work focuses primary on the Buryats living in southern Siberia. Her works on Buryat history are concerned largely with the process of conversion to Tibetan Buddhism that began in the eighteenth-century and the relations between shamanic and Buddhist practice. She has also published extensively on Buryat-Mongol folklore, holidays, and ritual. Since 1991, she has expanded her research to include the current Buddhist revival in Buryatia, post-Soviet reappropriations of Buryat historical figures, and the increasing influence of Buddhist communities from outside of Russia on post-Soviet Buryat life.

As a prominent scholar of Buddhism in Russia and of Buryatia, Dr. Zhukovskaya has been active in the Buddhist revivals of the 1990s and early 2000s. Her work has been claimed to demonstrate a bias in favor of the increased role of Buddhism in daily life, as well as towards the Buddhist modernizers of the late-nineteenth and early-twentieth centuries.

== Major works ==
- М.А. Кроль. Страницы моей жизни (мемуары). – Подготовка к изданию, предисловие, аннотированный указатель и комментарий. Москва – Иерусалим: Гешарим / Мосты культуры, 2008.
- Религия в истории и культуре монголоязычных народов России. – Составитель, отв. редактор и автор одной главы. М.: Восточная литература, 2008.
- Editor, Buryaty. Moskva: Nauka, 2004.
- Историко-культурный атлас Бурятии. М.: ДИК, 2001, 2-ое издание 2002 – Отв. редактор.
- Кочевники Монголии: Культура. Традиции. Символика. Учебное пособие. Kochevniki Mongolii: Kultura, Tradit's'ii, simvoika: uchoebnoe posobie. Moskva: Восточная литература Vostochaia Literatura, 2002.
- Мир традиционной монгольской культуры. USA; Lewinston, Queenston: The Edwin Mellen Press, 2000. 305 с.
- Editor, Shamanskii Dar: k 80 letiiu doktora istoricheskikh nauk Anny Vasil'evny Smoli'a'k. Moskva: Rossiiskaia akademiia nauk, Int. etnologii I antropologii imeni N.N. Miklikho Maklaia, 2000.
- От Карелии до Урала. Книга для чтения. Ot Karelii do Urala: Rasskazy o narodakh Rossii: Kniga dlia cheteniia po kursam «Istoriia rodnaia kraia. Moskva: Nauka, 1998.
- Vozrozhdenie buddhizma v Buriatii: problemi i perspektivy. Moskva: Rossiiskaia akademiia nauk, Int. etnologii i antropolii, 1997.
- Respublika Buriatia: etonoreligioznai situatsiia, 1991-1993. Moskva: Rossiiskaia akademiia nauk, Int. etnologii i antropolii, 1994.
- Editor, Buddizm: slovar'. Moskva: Izd-vo «Respublika», 1992.
- Судьба кочевой культуры. Рассказы о Монголии и монголах. Sud'ba kochevoi kul'tury: rasskazy o Mongolii i Mongolakh. Moskva: Nauka, 1990.
- Категории и символика традиционной культуры монголов Kategorii I simvolika tradit's'ionnoi kul'tury Mongolov. Moskva: Izd-vo «Nauka», 1988.
- Editor, Voprosy istorii lamaizma v Kalmykii. Elista: Kalmutskii nauch. Issl. Int. istorii, filologii i ekonomiki pri Sovete Ministrov Kalmytskoi ASSR, 1987.
- Святые реликвии: миф и действительность. М.: Политиздат, 1987 (в соавт. с С.А. Арутюновым). 119 с.
- Editor, Mify, kul'ty, obriady narodov zarubezhnoi Azii. Moskva: Izd-vo «Nauka», 1986.
- Ламаизм и ранние формы религии. Lamaizm: rannie formy religii. Moskva: Nauka, 1977.
