= Tubden Shedubling =

Buddhist temple complex in Moscow

- Standard Tibetan: ཐུབ་བསྟན་ཆོས་འགྲུབ་གླིང; Russian: Тубде́н Шедубли́нг
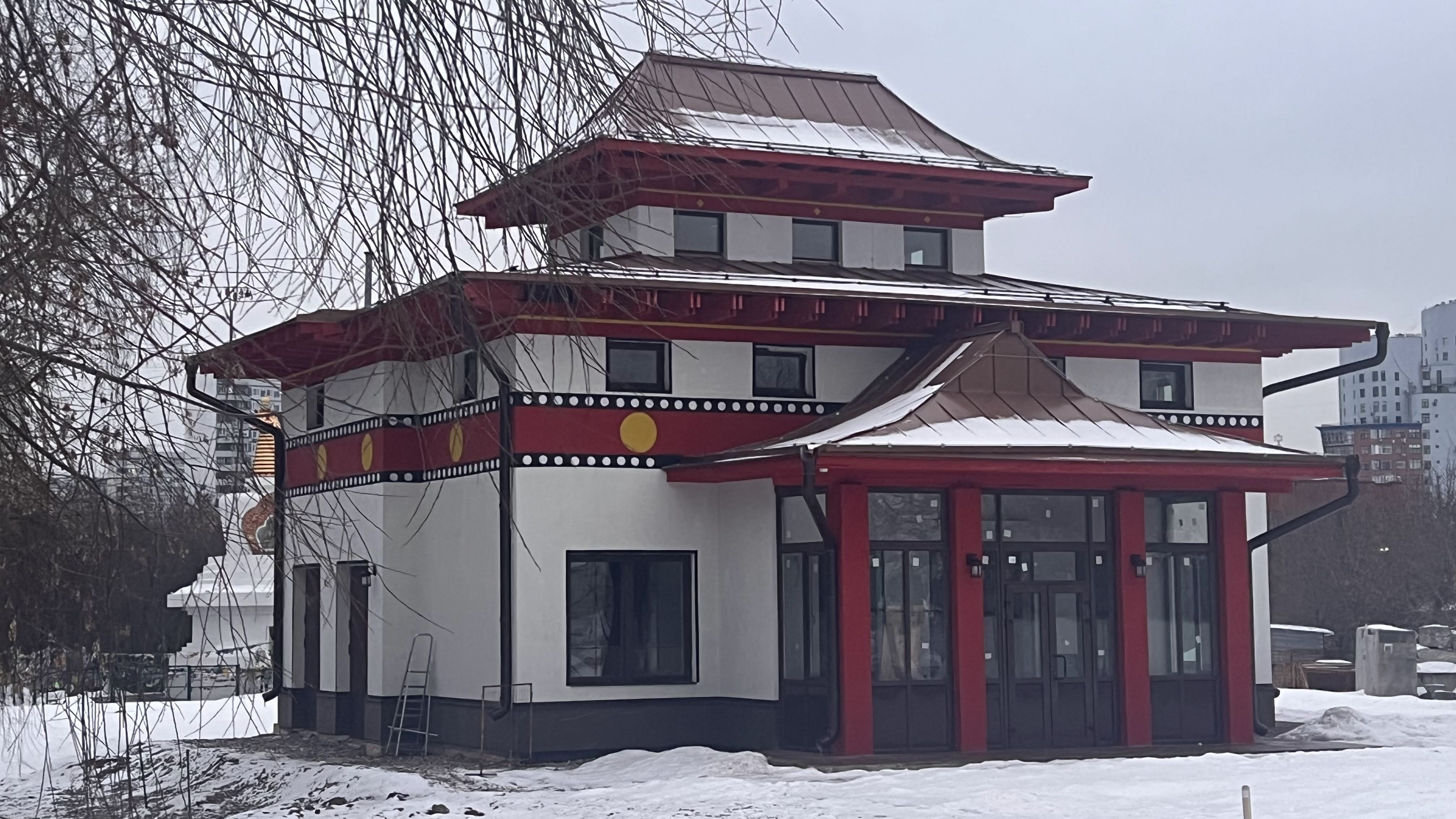
- The small temple in January 2023

- Location within Moscow
- Interactive map of Tubden Shedubling

Monastery information
- Denomination: Tibetan Buddhism

People
- Founder: religious organization "Moscow Buddhist Society"

Architecture
- Architect: Teryoshkin P.G., Ryazanov N., Arzhayeva V.D.
- Groundbreaking: 2002

Site
- Location: Novovladykinskiy Proyezd, ow. 15, Otradnoye District, Moscow
- Country: Russia
- Coordinates: 55°51′16.6″N 37°35′26″E
- Public access: Partially open to public
- Other information: metro station Vladikino / Otradnoye
- Website: http://moscowbuddhatemple.ru

The Tubden Shedubling (Russian: Тубден Шедублинг, Standard Tibetan: ཐུབ་བསྟན་ཆོས་འགྲུབ་གླིང) is a Buddhist temple complex in Otradnoye District, Moscow, and the first in the Russian capital.

== Content of the project ==
Buddhism has for several centuries been a major religion in several regions of Russia, including the republics of Tuva, Buryatia, and Kalmykia, and an important part of these cultures and identity.

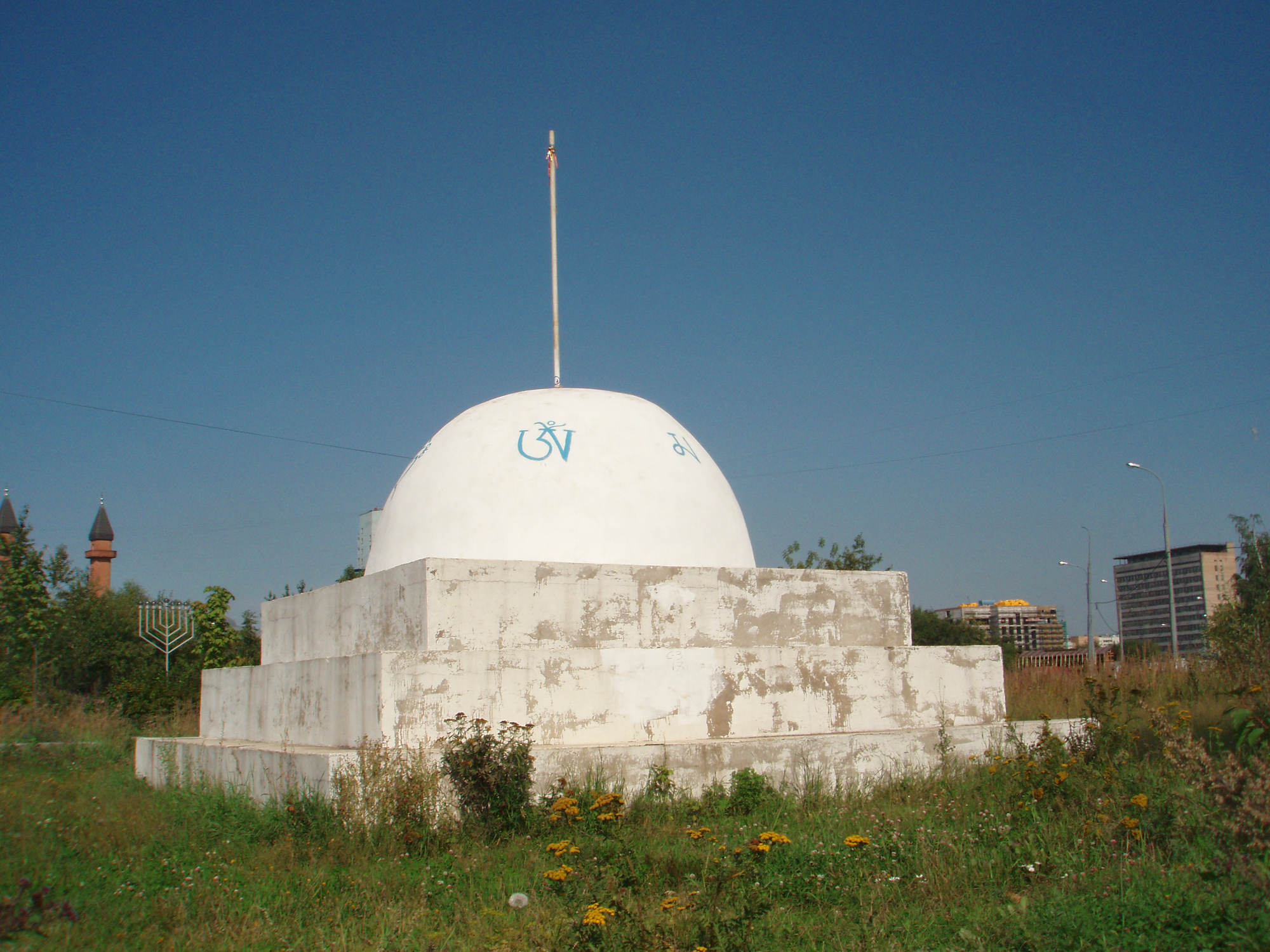
The temporary stupa in 2008

The temple complex is intended as a religious object, a center of social, cultural, research and publishing life (named "The Cultural-and-Educational Center"), and to enhance cooperation between the representatives of different nationalities and confessions. The Cultural-and-Educational Center will comprise a conference-hall, a library, as well as a charitable cafeteria, a medical center and a smaller temple for enshrinement of holy relics.

The temple complex will be located near the existing Orthodox Church with a chapel, the Muslim mosques Yardyam and Inam, and the Jewish synagogue, as part of the Spiritual and educational complex of Russian traditional religions.

== General specifications ==
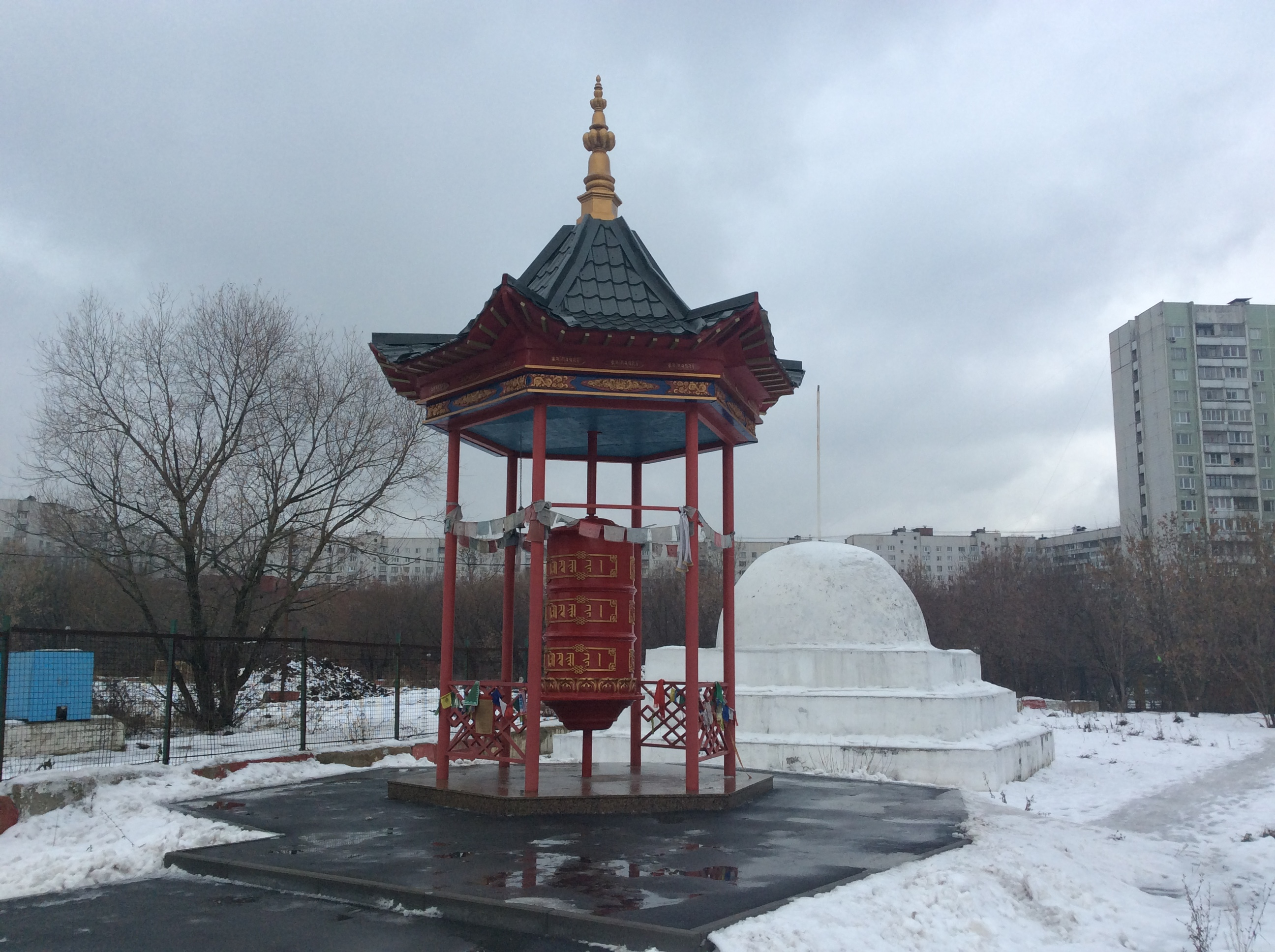
The Paradise Pagoda, consecrated in 2015

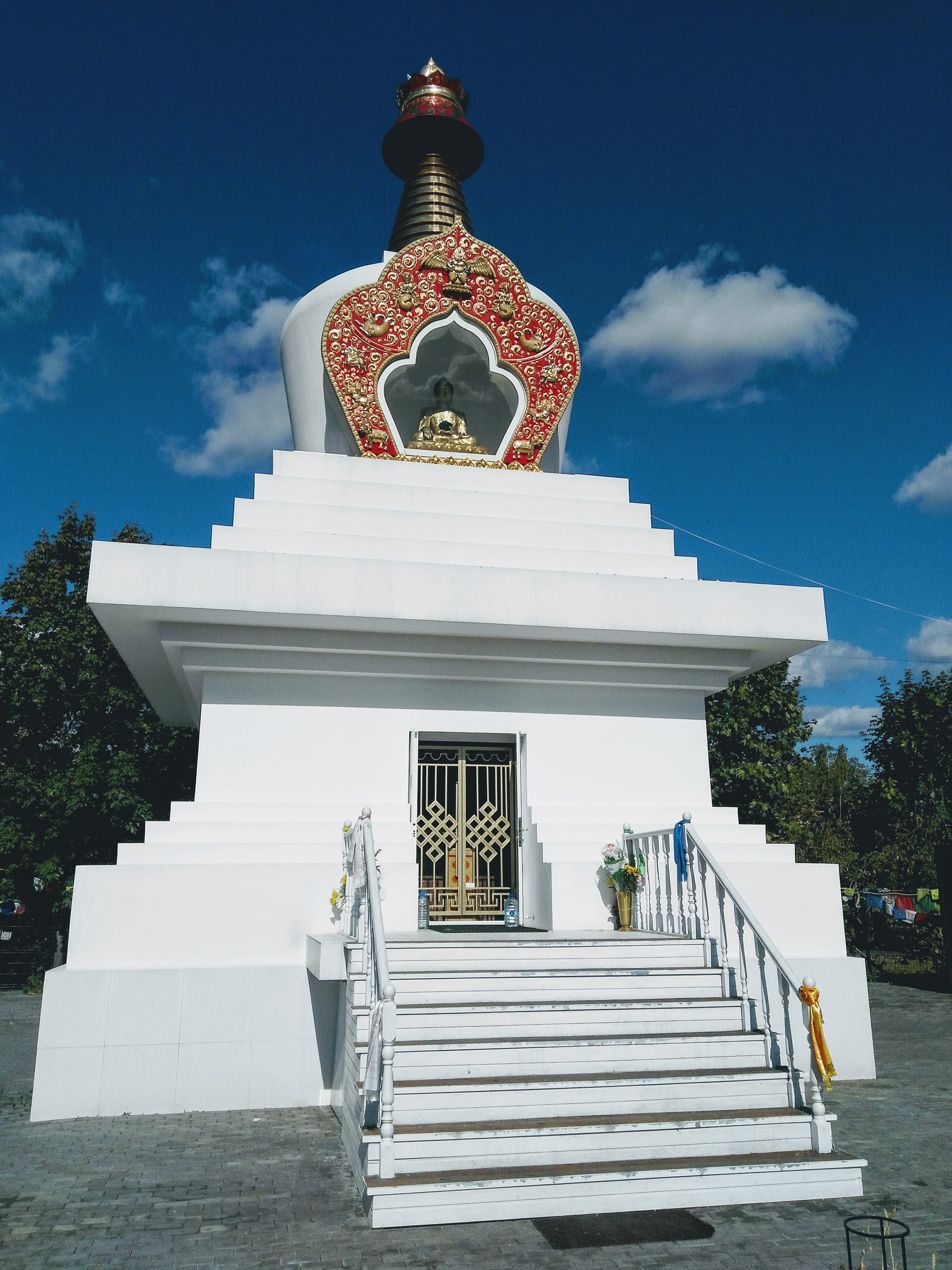
The Stupa of Enlightenment, opened in 2017

When completed the total area built on is intended to be 1,186.5 m^{2} (12,771 sq ft) , on a plot of land with an area of 2,875.5 m^{2} (30,952 sq ft). The complex will include:

Use	Area
Prayer rooms	600.6 m^{2} (6,465 sq ft)
Conference hall	293.9 m^{2} (3,164 sq ft)
Medical center	334.6 m^{2} (3,602 sq ft)
Library	222.2 m^{2} (2,392 sq ft)
Charitable cafeteria	471.4 m^{2} (5,074 sq ft)

== Development ==
The Moscow Buddhist Society performed a wide scope of works for implementation and coordination of the whole project having filed all applications for obtaining the Building Construction Permission for the Buddhist temple with a stupa to be built at: Moscow, Novovladykinsky Proezd, ow. 15.

The order of the Mayor of Moscow dated 26.10.2000 № 1117-РМ «On the construction of a Buddhist Temple on the site located at Novovladykinsky Proezd, 15 in the North-Eastern Administrative District of Moscow» has become a basic document for drafting permission documentation. The Contract of Lease № М-02-510122, dated 6.09.2004, was signed on the basis of this order.

In 2005, the Moscow Buddhist Society managed to almost double the territory of the construction, therefore, the Order of the Government of Moscow dated 28.12.2005 № 1109-PP «On amendments and additions to the Order of the Mayor of Moscow dated 26 October, 2000 № 1117-РМ» was issued with the following amendments in clause 1.1: «To permit the Moscow Buddhist Society to construct a Buddhist Temple at the address: Novovladykinsky Proezd, ow. 15, of the total maximum area of 3,000 sq.m (including the construction site of 2,100 sq.m.) on the surface area of 0.6027 ha».

Along with the above-mentioned papers, the pre-project and project documentation has been developed. The scope of the project documentation has been elaborated by the LLC "Personal Creative Workshop of Architect Tereshkin P.G." under the guidance of architect Tereshkin P.G.

On 1 October 2014, the Moscow Buddhist Society obtained the Building Construction Permission № RU77175000-010023.

The Moscow Buddhist Society negotiated with potential sponsors. The contractor was determined and the "preliminary" stage of construction works was finished.

On 19 February 2015, the completed Paradise Pagoda was consecrated by two lamas from the central khurul of Kalmykia, in a ceremony attended by the ambassadors of Mongolia, Vietnam, Myanmar, and Sri Lanka, and representatives of the three Russian republics, where Tibetan Buddhism is traditionally practiced; Tuva, Kalmykia and Buryatia. On 15 May 2015, People's Artist Joseph Kobzon attended a ceremony for the start of construction on the complex's temple. On 27 October 2016, work began on the Stupa of Enlightenment.
