= Buddhist Traditional Sangha of Russia =

Tibetan Buddhist organization in Russia

- Буддийская традиционная сангха России
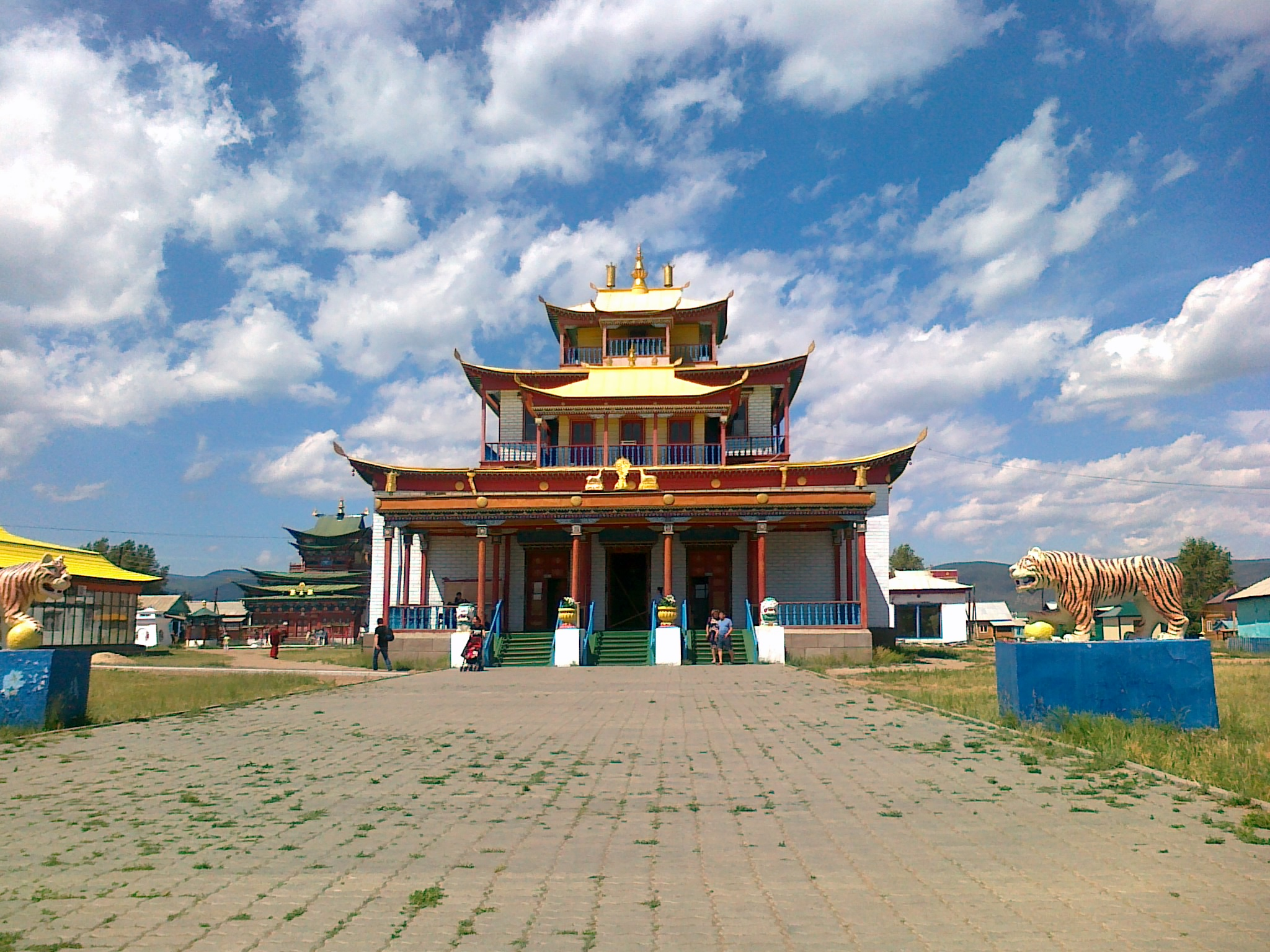
- Ivolginsky Datsan, headquarters of the organization
- Predecessor: Central Spiritual Board of Buddhists of the USSR
- Formation: 1997; 29 years ago
- Headquarters: Ivolginsky Datsan
- Leader: Damba Ayusheev
- Website: www.sangharussia.ru

Buddhist Traditional Sangha of Russia (Russian: Буддийская традиционная сангха России, romanized: Buddiyskaya traditsionnaya sangkha Rossii) is a Tibetan Buddhist centralized religious organization, which is the largest Tibetan Buddhist community in Buryatia and one of the largest in Russia. The center of the Buddhist Traditional Sangha of Russia and the main residence of Pandito Khambo Lama is located in the Ivolginsky Datsan, Buryatia. The second residence of Pandito Khambo Lama is the Khambyn Sume Datsan in Ulan-Ude.

== History ==
The BTSR is the legal successor of the Central Spiritual Board of Buddhists of the USSR, which existed during the Soviet period since 1946, and even earlier, from 1922 to the 1930s, under the name "Central Spiritual Council". After the death of Pandito Khambo Lama Munko Tsybikov in 1992, the CSAB lost stability and control over a number of datsans and began to split into separate structures. Between 1992 and 1995, the head of the CSAB changed three times.

In 1995, Damba Badmaevich Ayusheev became the head of the Central Spiritual Administration of Buddhists, Pandito Khambo Lama. The election was significantly helped by the fact that under the leadership of D. Ayusheev, the datsan "Baldan-Breybun" near Kyakhta was revived, which brought him considerable authority. During the initial period of his work, the new head of the Central Buddhist Buddhist Center achieved full administrative and financial control over a number of datsans, which became one of the main reasons for the strengthening of the organization's influence on Buddhism in Russia.

In 1997, Ayusheev changed the old name of the organization (Central Buddhist Buddhist Center) to the current one (BTSR), updated the charter and constituent documents. According to these documents, the BTSR ceased to include the Buddhist communities of Tuva and Kalmykia, and, according to a number of critics, significantly complicated the process of electing a new Pandito Khambo Lama. As the editor-in-chief of the magazine "Buddhism of Russia" A. A. Terentyev points out, according to the charter of the BTSR, "the head of this organization is elected by the abbots of the temples, and the abbots of the temples are appointed by the head of the organization". These actions of Ayusheev, as well as his failure to honor the 9th Jebtsundamba Khutughtu who visited Buryatia and a change in personnel policy led to the convening of an extraordinary council of the sangha (khural), which decided to remove Ayusheev from the post of Pandito Khambo Lama and elect N. Ilyukhinov.

Ayusheev, returning from a trip to Russia, convened a new extraordinary council of the sangha, which recognized the decisions of the previous extraordinary council as illegitimate on formal grounds (lack of quorum and the presence of outsiders at the council). After this, N. Ilyukhinov and his supporters registered their own all-Russian organization, called the "Spiritual Administration of Buddhists of Russia".

This incident, as well as the fact that BTSR refused to exhibit the "Atlas of Tibetan Medicine" in the United States, picketing, which was soon dispersed, became the reasons for the growing conflicts between the regional authorities and the BTSR board, which gradually ceased only in 2007 in connection with the resignation of the President of Buryatia Leonid Potapov.

In 1999, Lama Danzan-Khaybzun Samayev, who was the abbot of the Buddhist temple in St. Petersburg in the 1990s, began the “revolt of three datsans against the ‘dictatorship of Ayusheev’”, officially re-registering them as a new independent organization "Maidar". According to Samaev, the reason for this was that Ayusheev could no longer independently appoint the abbots of these datsans, the largest of which was the Atsagatsky Datsan, as well as disagreement with the general course of the Khambo Lama.

In 2001, a new split in the community formed. Opposition to Ayusheev was Choi-Dorji Budayev, who had previously been the head of the Central Spiritual Administration of Buddhists and had significant authority among the Buddhists of the region. Budaev created the Association of Buddhists of Buryatia, which included 8 organizations. The rhetoric of the new association is largely directed against the BTSR and Ayusheev, which is expressed in the extremely difficult relations between these organizations.

In 2004, the Rinpoche-Bagsha center was opened in Buryatia, headed by Lama Yeshe Lodoy Rinpoche, a representative of the Dalai Lama. Currently, the BTSR is a strictly hierarchical centralized organization that adheres to "strict ideological discipline".
