= Verkhnyaya Ivolga =

Verkhnyaya Ivolga Верхняя Иволга
- Selo
- Location within Republic of Buryatia Location within Russia
- Coordinates: 51°45′08″N 107°11′54″E
- Country: Russia
- Region: Republic of Buryatia
- District: Ivolginsky District
- Time zone: UTC+8:00

Verkhnyaya Ivolga (Russian: Верхняя Иволга; Buryat: Дээдэ Ивалга, Deede Ivalga) is a rural locality (a selo) in Ivolginsky District, Republic of Buryatia, Russia. The population was 981 as of 2010. There are 19 streets.

== Geography ==
Verkhnyaya Ivolga is located 7 km northwest of Ivolginsk (the district's administrative centre) by road. Ivolginsk is the nearest rural locality.
