= Dogoy =

Dogoy Догой
- Selo
- Location within Zabaykalsky Krai Location within Russia
- Coordinates: 51°21′N 114°39′E
- Country: Russia
- Region: Zabaykalsky Krai
- District: Mogoytuysky District
- Time zone: UTC+9:00

Dogoy (Russian: Догой) is a rural locality (a selo) in Mogoytuysky District, Zabaykalsky Krai, Russia. Population: 464 (2021 census); 669 (2010 census); 907 (2002 census); There are 19 streets in this selo.

== Geography ==
This rural locality is located 20 km from Mogoytuy (the district's administrative centre), 111 km from Chita (capital of Zabaykalsky Krai) and 5,373 km from Moscow. Buryatskaya is the nearest rural locality.
