= Kharganasha =

Kharganasha Харганаша
- Selo
- Location within Zabaykalsky Krai Location within Russia
- Coordinates: 51°15′N 115°02′E
- Country: Russia
- Region: Zabaykalsky Krai
- District: Mogoytuysky District
- Time zone: UTC+9:00

Kharganasha (Russian: Харганаша) is a rural locality (a selo) in Mogoytuysky District, Zabaykalsky Krai, Russia. Population: 245 (2021 census); 239 (2010 census); 133 (2002 census); There are 5 streets in this selo.

== Geography ==
This rural locality is located 8 km from Mogoytuy (the district's administrative centre), 138 km from Chita (capital of Zabaykalsky Krai) and 5,411 km from Moscow. Ostrechnaya is the nearest rural locality.
