= Tsugol =

Tsugol Цугол
- Selo
- Location within Zabaykalsky Krai Location within Russia
- Coordinates: 51°02′N 115°37′E
- Country: Russia
- Region: Zabaykalsky Krai
- District: Mogoytuysky District
- Time zone: UTC+9:00

Tsugol (Russian: Цугол) is a rural locality (a selo) in Mogoytuysky District, Zabaykalsky Krai, Russia. Population: 680 (2021 census); 837 (2010 census); 932 (2002 census); There are 13 streets in this selo.

== Geography ==
This rural locality is located 55 km from Mogoytuy (the district's administrative centre), 185 km from Chita (capital of Zabaykalsky Krai) and 5,478 km from Moscow. Nurinsk is the nearest rural locality.
