= Usharbay =

Usharbay Ушарбай
- Selo
- Location within Zabaykalsky Krai Location within Russia
- Coordinates: 51°23′N 114°50′E
- Country: Russia
- Region: Zabaykalsky Krai
- District: Mogoytuysky District
- Time zone: UTC+9:00

Usharbay (Russian: Ушарбай) is a rural locality (a selo) in Mogoytuysky District, Zabaykalsky Krai, Russia. Population: 888 (2021 census); 1,114 (2010 census); 1,164 (2002 census); There are 17 streets in this selo.

== Geography ==
This rural locality is located 14 km from Mogoytuy (the district's administrative centre), 117 km from Chita (capital of Zabaykalsky Krai) and 5,379 km from Moscow. Buryatskaya is the nearest rural locality.
