= Tsagan-Ola =

Tsagan-Ola Цаган-Ола
- Selo
- Location within Zabaykalsky Krai Location within Russia
- Coordinates: 51°21′N 115°28′E
- Country: Russia
- Region: Zabaykalsky Krai
- District: Mogoytuysky District
- Time zone: UTC+9:00

Tsagan-Ola (Russian: Цаган-Ола) is a rural locality (a selo) in Mogoytuysky District, Zabaykalsky Krai, Russia. Population: 1,072 (2021 census); 1,344 (2010 census); 1,065 (2002 census); There are 19 streets in this selo.

== Geography ==
This rural locality is located 39 km from Mogoytuy (the district's administrative centre), 156 km from Chita (capital of Zabaykalsky Krai) and 5,428 km from Moscow. Ulan-Sarta is the nearest rural locality.
