= Tsagan-Chelutay, Zabaykalsky Krai =

Tsagan-Chelutay Цаган-Челутай
- Selo
- Location within Zabaykalsky Krai Location within Russia
- Coordinates: 51°04′N 115°05′E
- Country: Russia
- Region: Zabaykalsky Krai
- District: Mogoytuysky District
- Time zone: UTC+9:00

Tsagan-Chelutay (Russian: Цаган-Челутай) is a rural locality (a selo) in Mogoytuysky District, Zabaykalsky Krai, Russia. Population: 1,069 (2021 census); 1,248 (2010 census); 1,310 (2002 census); There are 12 streets in this selo.

== Geography ==
This rural locality is located 26 km from Mogoytuy (the district's administrative centre), 154 km from Chita (capital of Zabaykalsky Krai) and 5,438 km from Moscow. Bilchirtuy is the nearest rural locality.
