= Khara-Shibir, Zabaykalsky Krai =

Khara-Shibir Хара-Шибирь
- Selo
- Location within Zabaykalsky Krai Location within Russia
- Coordinates: 51°31′N 115°11′E
- Country: Russia
- Region: Zabaykalsky Krai
- District: Mogoytuysky District
- Time zone: UTC+9:00

Khara-Shibir (Russian: Хара-Шибирь) is a rural locality (a selo) in Mogoytuysky District, Zabaykalsky Krai, Russia. Population: 1,286 (2021 census); 1,642 (2010 census); There are 14 streets in this selo.

== Geography ==
This rural locality is located 33 km from Mogoytuy (the district's administrative centre), 129 km from Chita (capital of Zabaykalsky Krai) and 5,386 km from Moscow. Bereya is the nearest rural locality.
