= Aga, Zabaykalsky Krai =

Aga Ага
- Settlement
- Location within Zabaykalsky Krai Location within Russia
- Coordinates: 51°14′N 115°09′E
- Country: Russia
- Region: Zabaykalsky Krai
- District: Mogoytuysky District
- Time zone: UTC+9:00

Aga (Russian: Ага) is a rural locality (a settlement) in Mogoytuysky District, Zabaykalsky Krai, Russia. Population: 1,134 (2021 census); 1,361 (2010 census); 1,525 (2002 census); There are 25 streets in this settlement.

== Geography ==
This rural locality is located 20 km from Mogoytuy (the district's administrative centre), 150 km from Chita (capital of Zabaykalsky Krai) and 5,429 km from Moscow. Ara-Bulak is the nearest rural locality.
