= Nurinsk =

Nurinsk Нуринск
- Selo
- Location within Zabaykalsky Krai Location within Russia
- Coordinates: 51°04′N 115°39′E
- Country: Russia
- Region: Zabaykalsky Krai
- District: Mogoytuysky District
- Time zone: UTC+9:00

Nurinsk (Russian: Нуринск) is a rural locality (a selo) in Mogoytuysky District, Zabaykalsky Krai, Russia. Population: 667 (2021 census); 789 (2010 census); 835 (2002 census); There are 18 streets in this selo.

== Geography ==
This rural locality is located 56 km from Mogoytuy (the district's administrative centre), 185 km from Chita (capital of Zabaykalsky Krai) and 5,476 km from Moscow. Zunor is the nearest rural locality.
