= Ostrechnaya =

Ostrechnaya Остречная
- Settlement
- Location within Zabaykalsky Krai Location within Russia
- Coordinates: 51°00′N 115°00′E
- Country: Russia
- Region: Zabaykalsky Krai
- District: Mogoytuysky District
- Time zone: UTC+9:00

Ostrechnaya (Russian: Остречная) is a rural locality (a settlement) in Mogoytuysky District, Zabaykalsky Krai, Russia. Population: 54 (2021 census); 62 (2010 census); 62 (2002 census); There is 1 street in this settlement.

== Geography ==
This rural locality is located 12 km from Mogoytuy (the district's administrative centre), 142 km from Chita (capital of Zabaykalsky Krai) and 5,418 km from Moscow. Ara-Bulak is the nearest rural locality.
