= Mogoytuy =

Mogoytuy (Russian: Могойтуй) is the name of several inhabited localities in Russia.

Urban localities

- Mogoytuy, Mogoytuysky District, Zabaykalsky Krai, an urban-type settlement in Mogoytuysky District, Zabaykalsky Krai
