= Bulak, Zabaykalsky Krai =

Bulak Булак
- Settlement
- Location within Zabaykalsky Krai Location within Russia
- Coordinates: 51°02′N 115°20′E
- Country: Russia
- Region: Zabaykalsky Krai
- District: Mogoytuysky District
- Time zone: UTC+9:00

Bulak (Russian: Булак) is a rural locality (a settlement) in Mogoytuysky District, Zabaykalsky Krai, Russia. Population: 39 (2021 census); 44 (2010 census); 43 (2002 census); There is 1 street in this settlement.

== Geography ==
This rural locality is located 40 km from Mogoytuy (the district's administrative centre), 170 km from Chita (capital of Zabaykalsky Krai) and 5,460 km from Moscow. Step is the nearest rural locality.
