= Aga-Khangil =

Aga-Khangil Ага-Хангил
- Selo
- Location within Zabaykalsky Krai Location within Russia
- Coordinates: 51°11′N 114°45′E
- Country: Russia
- Region: Zabaykalsky Krai
- District: Mogoytuysky District
- Time zone: UTC+9:00

Aga-Khangil (Russian: Ага-Хангил) is a rural locality (a selo) in Mogoytuysky District, Zabaykalsky Krai, Russia. Population: 997 (2021 census); 1,330 (2010 census); 1,347 (2002 census); There are 20 streets in this selo.

== Geography ==
This rural locality is located 16 km from Mogoytuy (the district's administrative centre), 129 km from Chita (capital of Zabaykalsky Krai) and 5,400 km from Moscow. Uronay is the nearest rural locality.
