= Ulan-Sarta =

Ulan-Sarta Улан-Сарта
- Selo
- Location within Zabaykalsky Krai Location within Russia
- Coordinates: 51°18′N 115°23′E
- Country: Russia
- Region: Zabaykalsky Krai
- District: Mogoytuysky District
- Time zone: UTC+9:00

Ulan-Sarta (Russian: Улан-Сарта) is a rural locality (a selo) in Mogoytuysky District, Zabaykalsky Krai, Russia. Population: 41 (2021 census); 48 (2010 census); 35 (2002 census); There are 2 streets in this selo.

== Geography ==
This rural locality is located 32 km from Mogoytuy (the district's administrative centre), 154 km from Chita (capital of Zabaykalsky Krai) and 5,428 km from Moscow. Tsagan-Ola is the nearest rural locality.
