= Zunor =

Zunor Зунор
- Selo
- Location within Zabaykalsky Krai Location within Russia
- Coordinates: 51°06′N 115°36′E
- Country: Russia
- Region: Zabaykalsky Krai
- District: Mogoytuysky District
- Time zone: UTC+9:00

Zunor (Russian: Зунор) is a rural locality (a selo) in Mogoytuysky District, Zabaykalsky Krai, Russia. Population: 30 (2021 census); 50 (2010 census); 107 (2002 census);

== Geography ==
This rural locality is located 52 km from Mogoytuy (the district's administrative centre), 180 km from Chita (capital of Zabaykalsky Krai) and 5,470 km from Moscow. Nurinsk is the nearest rural locality.
