= Ara-Bulak =

Ara-Bulak Ара-Булак
- Selo
- Location within Zabaykalsky Krai Location within Russia
- Coordinates: 51°11′N 115°05′E
- Country: Russia
- Region: Zabaykalsky Krai
- District: Mogoytuysky District
- Time zone: UTC+9:00

Ara-Bulak (Russian: Ара-Булак) is a rural locality (a selo) in Mogoytuysky District, Zabaykalsky Krai, Russia. Population: 165 (2021 census); 204 (2010 census); 200 (2002 census); There are 2 streets in this selo.

== Geography ==
This rural locality is located 15 km from Mogoytuy (the district's administrative centre), 145 km from Chita (capital of Zabaykalsky Krai) and 5,422 km from Moscow. Ostrechnaya is the nearest rural locality.
