= Bilchirtuy =

Bilchirtuy Бильчиртуй
- Selo
- Location within Zabaykalsky Krai Location within Russia
- Coordinates: 51°00′N 115°00′E
- Country: Russia
- Region: Zabaykalsky Krai
- District: Mogoytuysky District
- Time zone: UTC+9:00

Bilchirtuy (Russian: Бильчиртуй) is a rural locality (a selo) in Mogoytuysky District, Zabaykalsky Krai, Russia. Population: 460 (2021 census); 488 (2010 census); 400 (2002 census); There is 1 street in this selo.

== Geography ==
This rural locality is located 30 km from Mogoytuy (the district's administrative centre), 160 km from Chita (capital of Zabaykalsky Krai) and 5,446 km from Moscow. Tsagan-Chelutay is the nearest rural locality.
