= Buryatskaya =

Buryatskaya Бурятская
- Settlement
- Location within Zabaykalsky Krai Location within Russia
- Coordinates: 51°26′N 114°42′E
- Country: Russia
- Region: Zabaykalsky Krai
- District: Mogoytuysky District
- Time zone: UTC+9:00

Buryatskaya (Russian: Бурятская) is a rural locality (a settlement) in Mogoytuysky District, Zabaykalsky Krai, Russia. Population: 142 (2021 census); 183 (2010 census); 184 (2002 census); There are 3 streets in this settlement.

== Geography ==
This rural locality is located 24 km from Mogoytuy (the district's administrative centre), 106 km from Chita (capital of Zabaykalsky Krai) and 5,363 km from Moscow. Usharbay is the nearest rural locality.
