= Mogoytuy, Mogoytuysky District, Zabaykalsky Krai =

Mogoytuy Могойтуй
- Urban-type settlement

Other transcription(s)
  - Buryat: Могойто
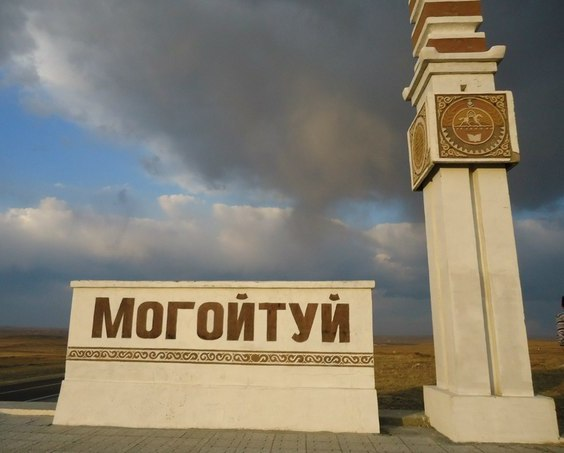
- Interactive map of Mogoytuy
- Location of Mogoytuy Mogoytuy (Zabaykalsky Krai)
- Coordinates: 51°17′N 114°55′E
- Country: Russia
- Federal subject: Zabaykalsky Krai
- Administrative district: Mogoytuysky District
- Founded: 1907

Population (2010 Census)
  - Total: 10,231
  - Estimate (1 January 2018): 11,007 (+7.6%)

Administrative status
  - Capital of: Mogoytuysky District

Municipal status
  - Urban okrug: Agin-Buryat Okrug
  - Capital of: Agin-Buryat Okrug
- Time zone: UTC+9 (MSK+6)
- Postal code: 687420
- OKTMO ID: 76625151051

Mogoytuy (Russian: Могойтуй; Buryat: Могойто, Mogoito) is an urban locality (an urban-type settlement) and the administrative center of Mogoytuysky District in Zabaykalsky Krai, Russia. Population: 10,231 (2010 census); 8,586 (2002 census); 7,276 (1989 Soviet census).

== Geography ==
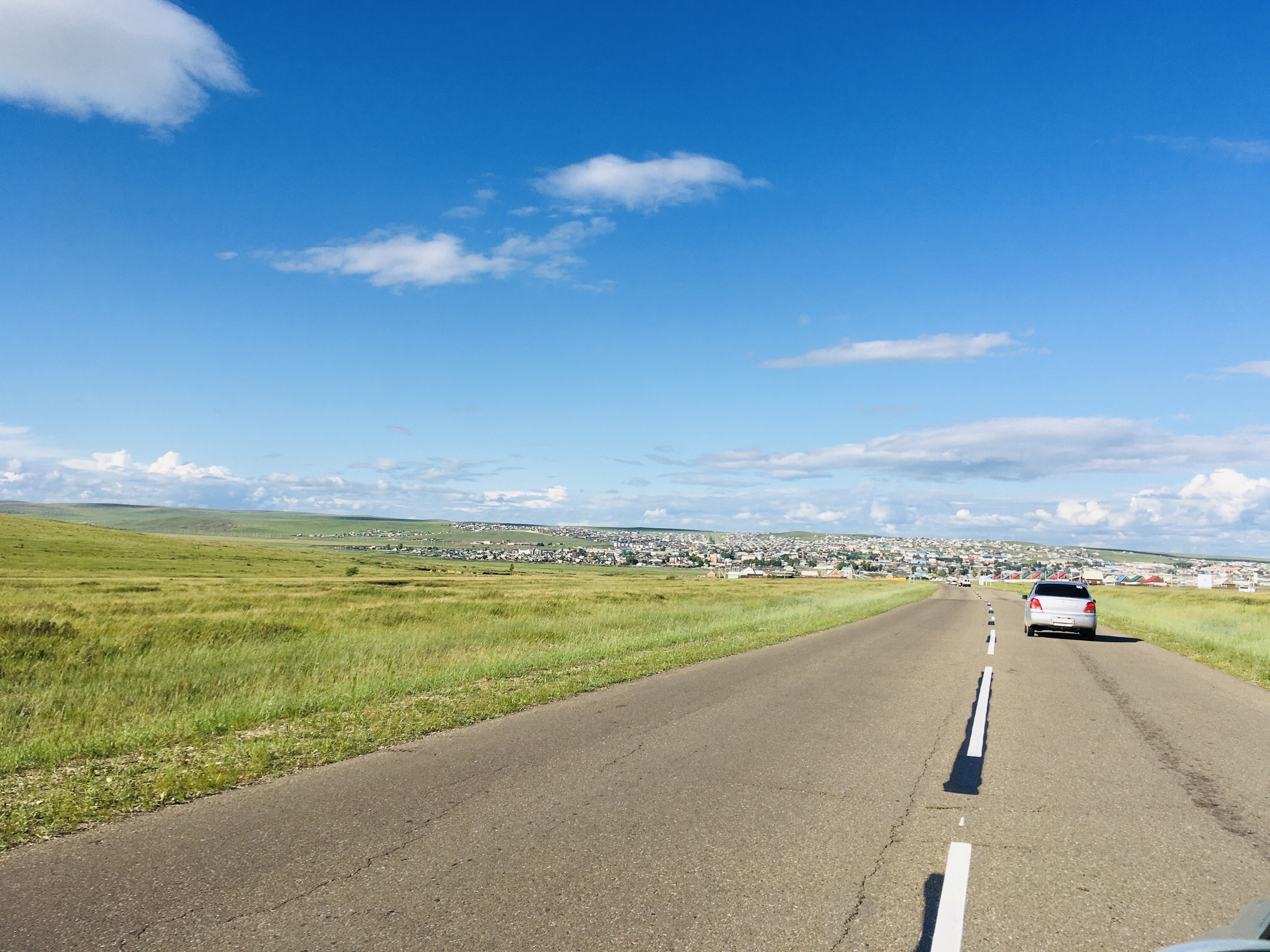
Village Mogoytuy from the highway

It is located on river. Mogoytuy, 36 km to the north-east. from the village Aginskoye, 189 km (by rail) to the south-east from Chita. There is a regional hospital and museum. There is a branch of the State Eastern Siberian Technological University of Ulan-Ude.

== History ==
It was founded in 1907 with the arrival of a railroad station. Mogoytuy became the seat of the district in 1942. A power plant was commissioned in 1947. The settlement received town status in 1966.

== Economy ==
There are 50 enterprises, organizations and institutions, including the OAO Mogoytuisk motor-repair plant, the tank farm, and the flour mill.
