= Mogoytuysky District =

Mogoytuysky District Могойтуйский район (Russian)
- District
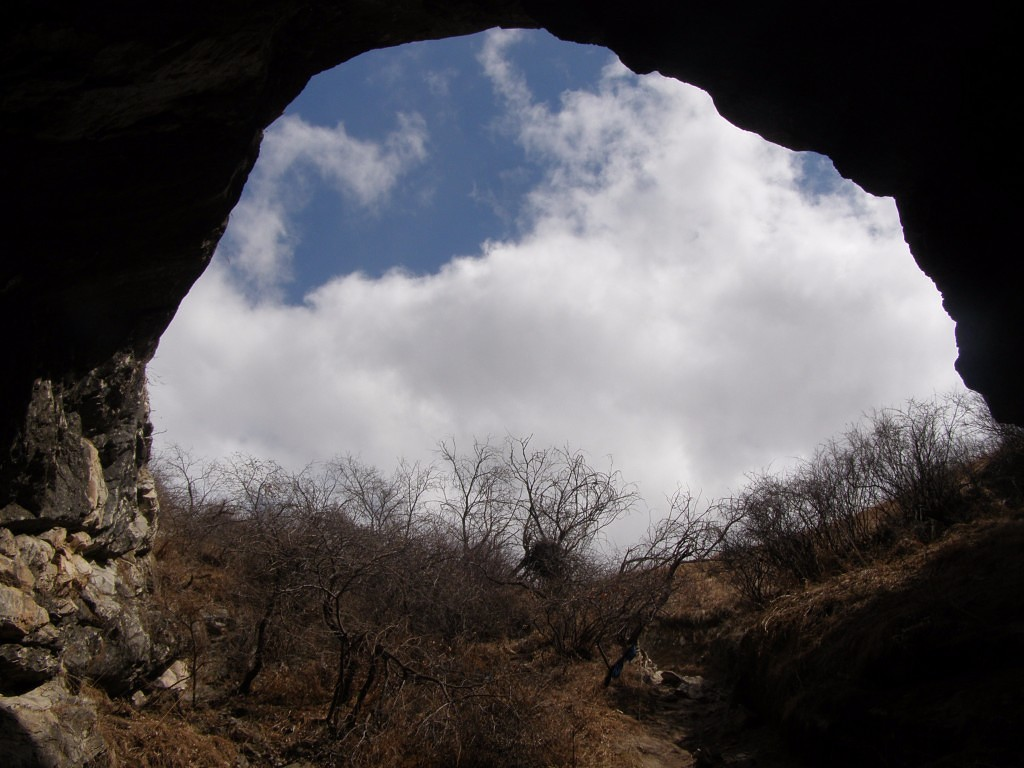
- Keetey Caves

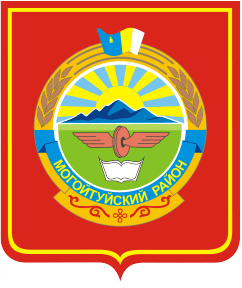
- Coat of arms
- Location of Mogoytuysky District in Agin-Buryat Okrug, Zabaykalsky Krai
- Coordinates: 51.243°N 115.190°E
- Country: Russia
- Federal subject: Zabaykalsky Krai
- Established: December 8, 1942
- Administrative center: Mogoytuy

Area
  - Total: 6,300 km^{2} (2,400 sq mi)

Population (2010 Census)
  - Total: 27,463
  - Density: 4.4/km^{2} (11/sq mi)
  - Urban: 37.3%
  - Rural: 62.7%

Administrative structure
  - Inhabited localities: 1 urban-type settlements, 29 rural localities

Municipal structure
  - Municipally incorporated as: Mogoytuysky Municipal District
  - Municipal divisions: 1 urban settlements, 14 rural settlements
- Time zone: UTC+9 (MSK+6)
- OKTMO ID: 76625000
- Website: http://mogoitui.ru/

Mogoytuysky District (Russian: Могойтуйский райо́н; Buryat: Могойтын аймаг, Mogoityn aimag) is an administrative and municipal district (raion) of Agin-Buryat Okrug of Zabaykalsky Krai, Russia, one of the thirty-one in the krai, and borders with Shilkinsky District in the north, Olovyanninsky District in the east, Ononsky District in the south, and with Aginsky District in the west. The area of the district is 6,300 square kilometers (2,400 sq mi). Its administrative center is the urban locality (an urban-type settlement) of Mogoytuy. Population: 27,463 (2010 census); 27,386 (2002 Census); 28,647 (1989 Soviet census). The population of Mogoytuy accounts for 37.3% of the district's total population.

== History ==
The district was established on December 8, 1942.

== Gallery ==
Landscapes of the Mogoytuy region near the village of Mogoytuy

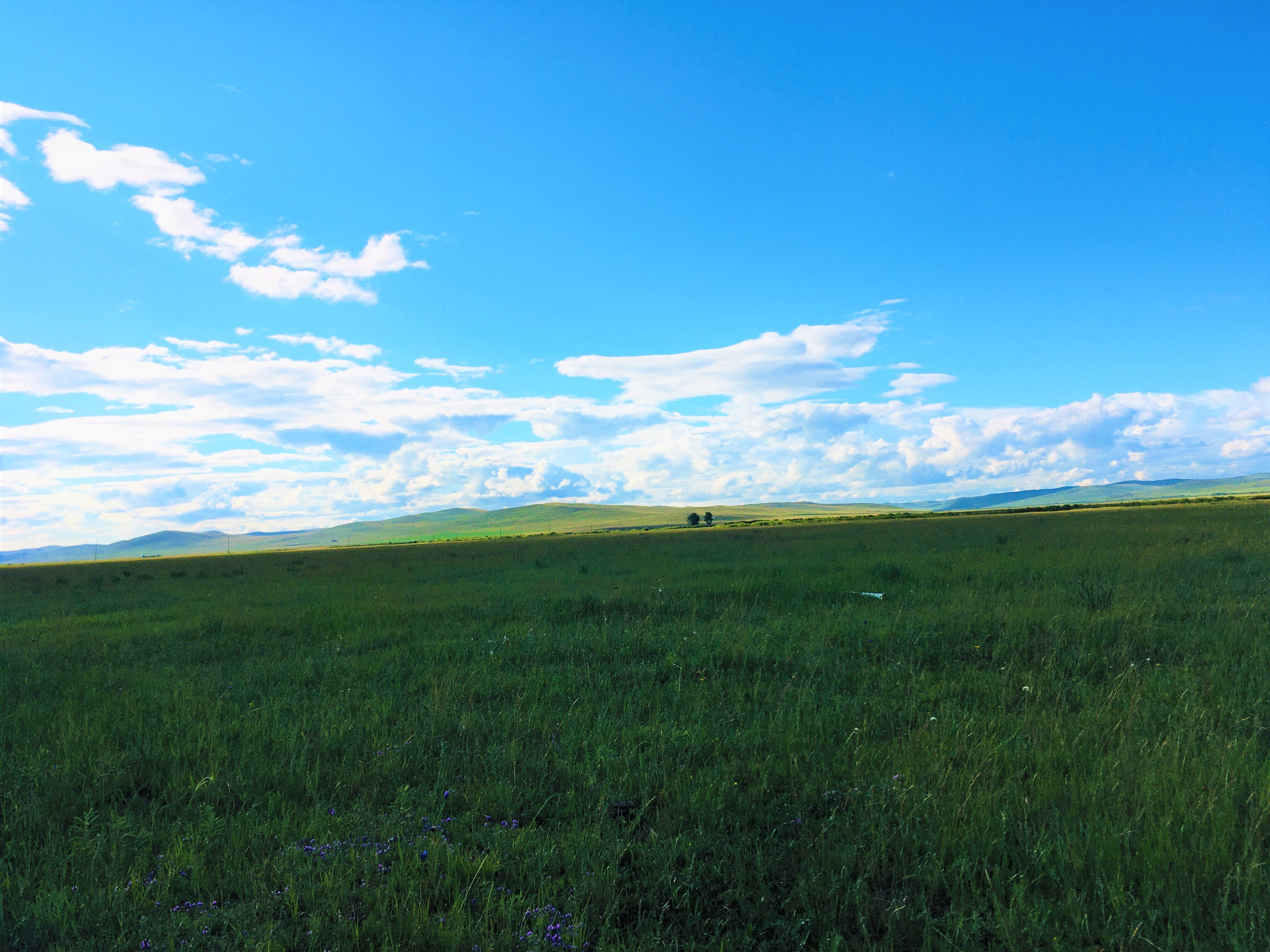

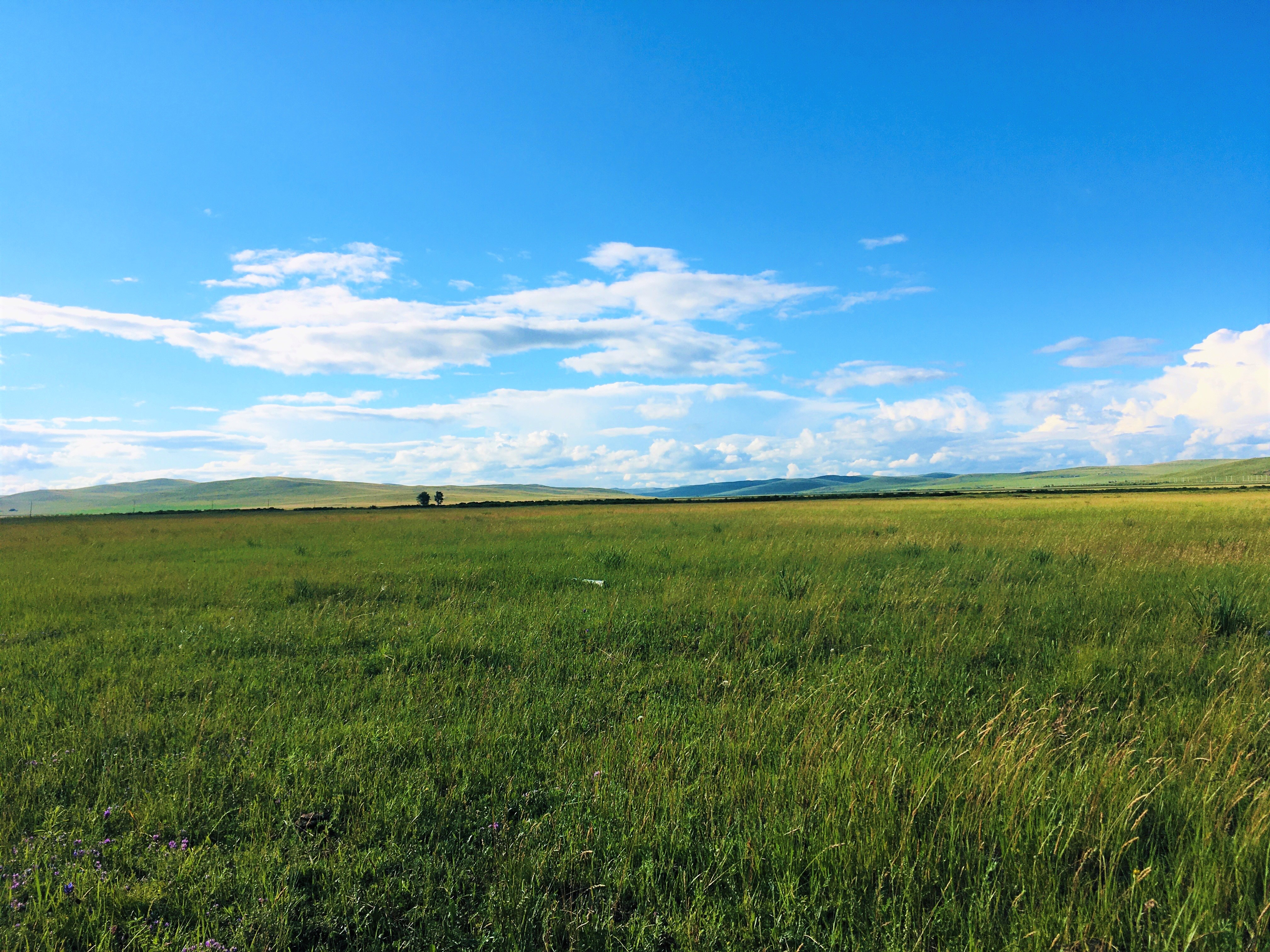

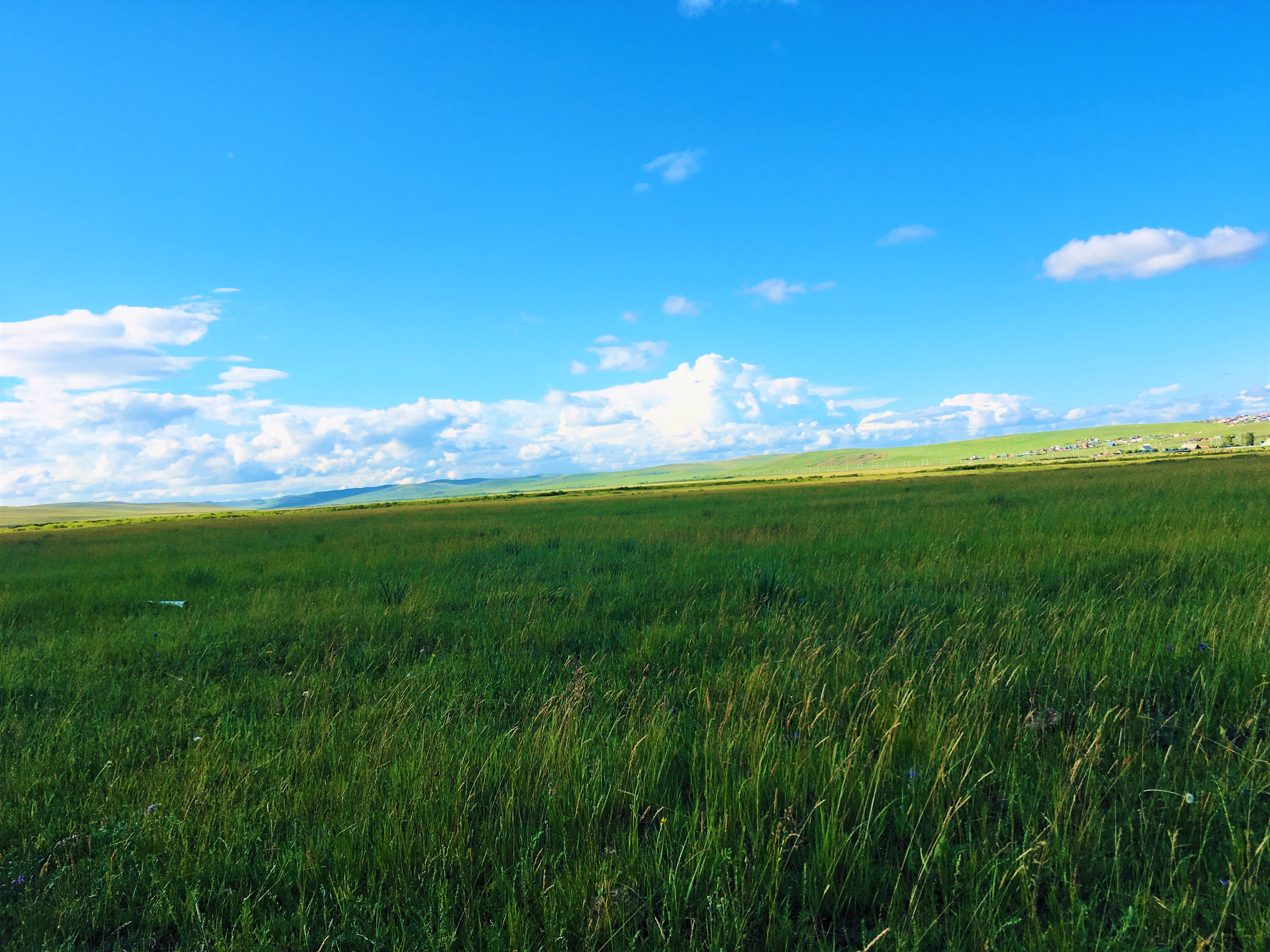

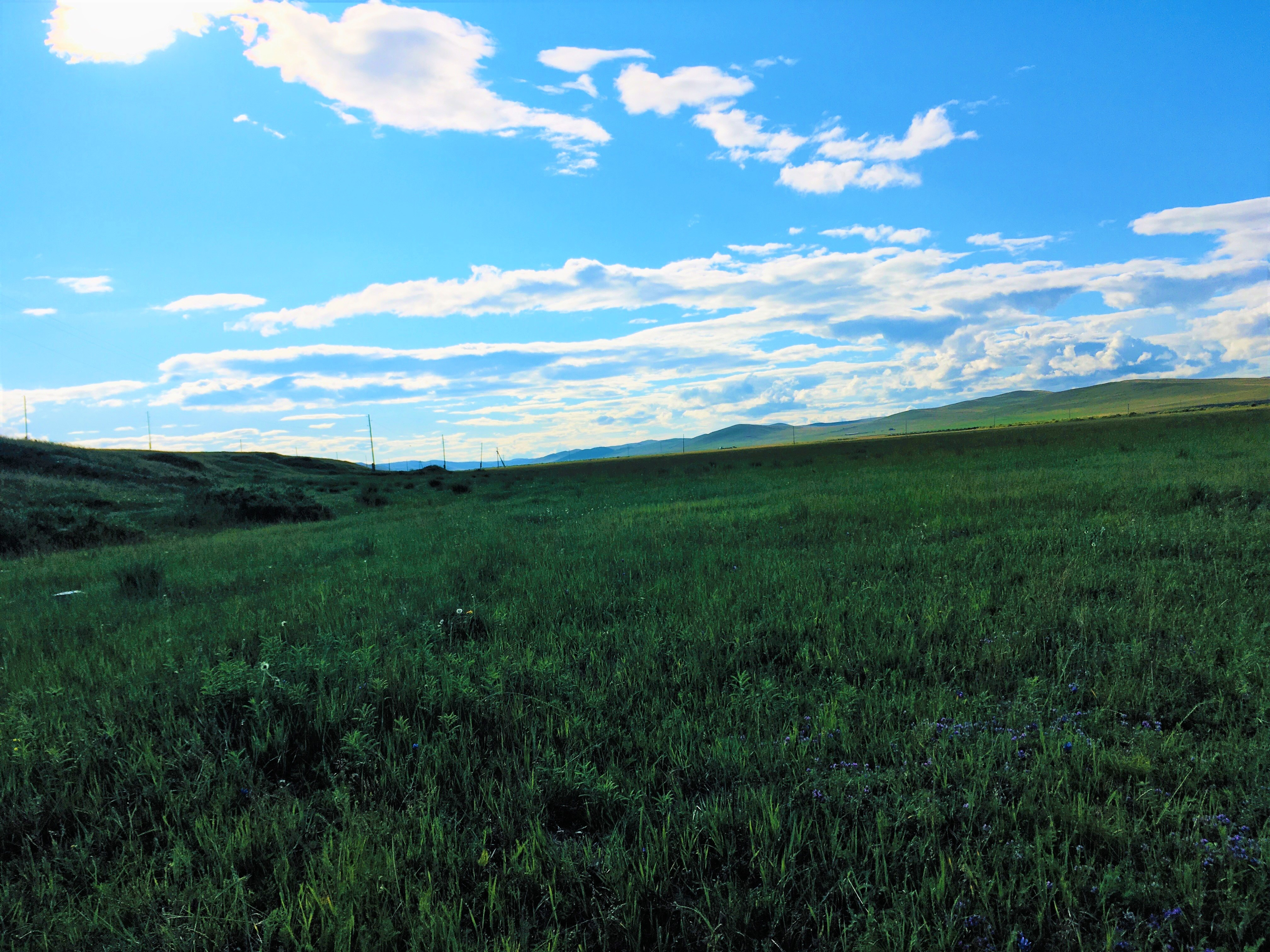
