= List of rural localities in Buryatia =

Map of Russia with Buryatia highlighted

This is a list of rural localities in Buryatia. Buryatia (formally the Republic of Buryatia, Russian: Респу́блика Буря́тия, romanized: Respublika Buryatiya, IPA: [rʲɪsˈpublʲɪkə bʊˈrʲætʲɪjə]; Buryat: Буряад Улас, romanized: Buryaad Ulas, pronounced [bʊˈrʲɑːt ʊˈlɑs], Mongolian: Буриад Улс, romanized: Buriad Uls) is a federal subject of Russia (a republic), located in Siberia in Asia. Formerly part of the Siberian Federal District, it is part of the Russian Far East since 2018. Its capital is the city of Ulan-Ude. Its area is 351,300 square kilometers (135,600 sq mi) with a population of 972,021 (2010 Census).

== Barguzinsky District ==
Rural localities in Barguzinsky District:

- Adamovo
- Barguzin
- Bayangol
- Bodon
- Borogol
- Chitkan
- Dushelan
- Gusikha
- Ina
- Katun
- Khara-Usun
- Khilgana
- Kurbulik
- Makarinino
- Maloye Uro
- Maximikha
- Monakhovo
- Nesterikha
- Shapenkovo
- Soyol
- Sukhaya
- Suvo
- Ulyukchikan
- Ulyun
- Uro
- Urzhil
- Yarikta
- Yubileyny
- Zhuravlikha
- Zorino

== Bauntovsky District ==
Rural localities in Bauntovsky District:

- Baunt
- Bugunda
- Busani
- Karaftit
- Kurort Baunt
- Malovsky
- Maly Amalat
- Mongoy
- Okunevo
- Romanovka
- Rossoshino
- Severny
- Troitsky
- Tsipikan
- Uakit
- Ust-Antose
- Ust-Dzhilinda
- Uya
- Varvarinsky

== Bauntovsky Evenkiysky District ==
Rural localities in Bauntovsky Evenkiysky District:

- Bagdarin

== Bichursky District ==
Rural localities in Bichursky District:

- Altachey
- Amagalantuy
- Ara-Kiret
- Bichura
- Bilyutay
- Buy
- Dabatuy
- Deben
- Dunda-Kiret
- Elan
- Gutay
- Kharlun
- Khayan
- Khonkholoy
- Maly Kunaley
- Motnya
- Nizhny Mangirtuy
- Novosretenka
- Okino-Klyuchi
- Petropavlovka
- Podgornoye
- Pokrovka
- Poselye
- Potanino
- Sakharny Zavod
- Shanaga
- Shibertuy
- Sloboda
- Sredny Kharlun
- Starye Klyuchi
- Sudutuy
- Sukhoy Ruchey
- Topka
- Ust-Zagan
- Uzky Lug
- Verkhny Mangirtuy

== Dzhidinsky District ==
Rural localities in Dzhidinsky District:

- Altsak
- Armak
- Bayan
- Beloozyorsk
- Borgoy
- Botsy
- Bulyk
- Dede-Ichyotuy
- Dodo-Ichyotuy
- Dyrestuy
- Dzhida
- Gegetuy
- Inzagatuy
- Khuldat
- Khuzhir
- Maly Naryn
- Naryn
- Nizhny Burgaltay
- Nizhny Torey
- Nyuguy
- Oyor
- Petropavlovka
- Podkhuldochi
- Shartykey
- Stary Ukyrchelon
- Tasarkhay
- Tengerek
- Tokhoy
- Tsagan-Usun
- Tsagatuy
- Ulzar
- Verkhny Burgaltay
- Verkhny Torey
- Verkhny Yonkhor
- Yonkhor
- Zarubino
- Zheltura

== Ivolginsky District ==
Rural localities in Ivolginsky District:

- Barun-Orongoy
- Ganzurino
- Ganzurino
- Gilbira
- Gurulba
- Ivolginsk
- Kalyonovo
- Khoytobeye
- Khuramsha
- Kibalino
- Klyuchi
- Kokorino
- Kolobki
- Krasnoyarovo
- Nizhnyaya Ivolga
- Nur-Seleniye
- Orongoy
- Orongoy
- Oshurkovo
- Poselye
- Shaluta
- Sotnikovo
- Suzha
- Tapkhar
- Ulan-Ivolginsky
- Verkhnyaya Ivolga
- Zun-Orongoy

== Kabansky District ==
Rural localities in Kabansky District:

- Baykalsky Priboy
- Beregovaya
- Bolshaya Rechka
- Bolshoye Kolesovo
- Borki
- Boyarsky
- Bryansk
- Bykovo
- Dubinino
- Dulan
- Fofonovo
- Gorny
- Inkino
- Istok
- Istomino
- Ivanovka
- Kabansk
- Kargino
- Kedrovaya
- Khandala
- Klyuyevka
- Korsakovo
- Krasny Yar
- Kudara
- Maloye Kolesovo
- Manturikha
- Mishikha
- Murzino
- Nikolsk
- Novaya Derevnya
- Novy Enkheluk
- Nyuki
- Oymur
- Pereyomnaya
- Polevoy
- Posolskaya
- Posolskoye
- Priboy
- Ranzhurovo
- Rechka Mishikha
- Rechka Vydrino
- Romanovo
- Sherashovo
- Shergino
- Shigayevo
- Stepnoy Dvorets
- Sukhaya
- Tankhoy
- Tarakanovka
- Timlyuy
- Tolbazikha
- Treskovo
- Tvorogovo
- Vydrino
- Vydrino
- Yelan
- Zakaltus
- Zarechye
- Zhilino

== Khorinsky District ==
Rural localities in Khorinsky District:

- Alan
- Amgalanta
- Aninsk
- Ashanga
- Barun-Khasurta
- Bayan-Gol
- Bulum
- Georgiyevskoye
- Khandagay
- Khasurta
- Khorinsk
- Kulsk
- Kulsky Stanok
- Malaya Kurba
- Mayla
- Mogoy
- Naryn
- Oninoborsk
- Oybont
- Sannomysk
- Tarbagatay
- Tegda
- Tokhoryukta
- Udinsk
- Verkhniye Taltsy
- Zun-Khuray

== Kizhinginsky District ==
Rural localities in Kizhinginsky District:

- Bakhlayta
- Bulak
- Chesan
- Edermeg
- Innokentyevka
- Khurtey
- Kizhinga
- Kodunsky Stanok
- Krasny Yar
- Kulkison
- Kuorka
- Leonovka
- Mikhaylovka
- Mogsokhon
- Novokizhinginsk
- Orot
- Sulkhara
- Ulzyte
- Ushkhayta
- Ust-Orot
- Zagustay

== Kurumkansky District ==
Rural localities in Kurumkansky District:

- Alla
- Arbun
- Argada
- Arzgun
- Baragkhan
- Bulag
- Elesun
- Galgatay
- Garga
- Kharamodun
- Khargana
- Khonkhino
- Kucheger
- Kurumkan
- Maysky
- Mogoyto
- Murgun
- Nama
- Sakhuli
- Shamanka
- Taza
- Tomokto
- Tungen
- Ugnasay
- Ulyunkhan
- Unegetey
- Yagdyg

== Kyakhtinsky District ==
Rural localities in Kyakhtinsky District:

- Anagustay
- Ara-Altsagat
- Bolshaya Kudara
- Bolshoy Lug
- Burduny
- Chikoy
- Dunguy
- Dureny
- Enkhe-Tala
- Ivanovka
- Kalinishna
- Khamnigaday
- Kharyasta
- Khilgantuy
- Kholoy
- Khoronkhoy
- Khutor
- Kiran
- Kudara-Somon
- Kurort Kiran
- Malaya Kudara
- Murochi
- Novodesyatnikovo
- Oktyabrsky
- Pervomayskoye
- Polkanovo
- Semyonovka
- Sharagol
- Shazagay
- Subuktuy
- Sudzha
- Tamir
- Tsagan-Chelutay
- Ubur-Kiret
- Ulady
- Ungurkuy
- Ust-Dunguy
- Ust-Kiran
- Ust-Kyakhta
- Verkhniye Murochi

== Mukhorshibirsky District ==
Rural localities in Mukhorshibirsky District:

- Balta
- Bar
- Bom
- Chernoyarovo
- Galtay
- Gashey
- Kalinovka
- Kharashibir
- Kharyastka
- Khonkholoy
- Khoshun-Uzur
- Kugoty
- Kusoty
- Mukhorshibir
- Narsata
- Nikolsk
- Novospassk
- Novy Zagan
- Podlopatki
- Sagan-Nur
- Sharalday
- Shinestuy
- Stary Zagan
- Stepnoy
- Tsolga
- Tugnuy
- Ust-Altasha
- Verhny Sutay
- Zandin

== Muysky District ==
Rural localities in Muysky District:

- Bambuyka
- Bargalino
- Irakinda
- Muya
- Ust-Muya
- Vitim

== Okinsky District ==
Rural localities in Okinsky District:

- Alag-Shulun
- Angir
- Balakta
- Baturino
- Bokson
- Botogol
- Burdukovo
- Burlya
- Cheryomushka
- Goryachinsk
- Gremyachinsk
- Gurulyovo
- Ilyinka
- Irkilik
- Istok
- Itantsa
- Karymsk
- Khalzanovo
- Khara-Khuzhir
- Khurga
- Khuzhir
- Kika
- Klochnevo
- Koma
- Kotokel
- Lesovozny
- Listvennichnoye
- Mostovka
- Nesterovo
- Orlik
- Ostrog
- Pokrovka
- Samarta
- Sayany
- Sharza
- Shasnur
- Sobolikha
- Sorok
- Staroye Tataurovo
- Subarya
- Talovka
- Talovka
- Tataurovo
- Troitskoye
- Turka
- Yartsy
- Yelovka
- Yugovo
- Zasukhino
- Zolotoy Klyuch
- Zun-Kholba
- Zyryansk

== Pribaykalsky District ==
Rural localities in Pribaykalsky District:

- Turuntayevo

== Selenginsky District ==
Rural localities in Selenginsky District:

- Ardasan
- Baraty
- Bilyutay
- Bulak
- Burgastay
- Deben
- Dede-Sutoy
- Gusinoye Ozero
- Khargana
- Mengey
- Nizhny Ubukun
- Novoselenginsk
- Nur-Tukhum
- Povorot
- Selenduma
- Shana
- Sosnovka
- Sredny Ubukun
- Sulfat
- Tashir
- Tayozhny
- Temnik
- Tokhoy
- Tsaydam
- Tukhum
- Ubukun
- Udunga
- Ust-Urma
- Yagodnoye
- Yekhe-Tsagan
- Yenhor
- Zalan
- Zaozerny
- Zhargalanta
- Zurgan-Debe

== Severo-Baykalsky District ==
Rural localities in Severo-Baykalsky District:

- Angoya
- Baykalskoye
- Davsha
- Dushkachan
- Kholodnaya
- Kumora
- Uoyan
- Verkhnyaya Zaimka

== Tarbagataysky District ==
Rural localities in Tarbagataysky District:

- Barykino
- Barykino-Klyuchi
- Bolshoy Kunaley
- Burnashevo
- Desyatnikovo
- Kardon
- Khandagatay
- Kharitonovo
- Kuytun
- Lesnoy
- Nadeyino
- Nikolayevsky
- Nizhny Sayantuy
- Nizhny Zhirim
- Pesterovo
- Saratovka
- Sayantuy
- Selenga
- Solontsy
- Tarbagatay
- Verkhny Sayantuy
- Verkhny Zhirim
- Voznesenovka

== Tunkinsky District ==
Rural localities in Tunkinsky District:

- Akhalik
- Dalakhay
- Galbay
- Guzhiry
- Kharbyaty
- Khongodory
- Khoyto-Gol
- Khuray-Khobok
- Khuzhiry
- Kyren
- Maly Zhemchug
- Mogoy-Gorkhon
- Mondy
- Moygoty
- Nikolsk
- Nilovka
- Nugan
- Okhor-Shibir
- Shanay
- Shimki
- Shuluta
- Tabalangut
- Tagarkhay
- Taloye
- Tory
- Tunka
- Turan
- Ulan-Gorkhon
- Ulbugay
- Yelovka
- Yengorga
- Zaktuy
- Zhemchug
- Zun-Murino

== Yeravninsky District ==
Rural localities in Yeravninsky District:

- Domna
- Egita
- Garam
- Gonda
- Gunda
- Isinga
- Khangir
- Khorga
- Komsomolskoye
- Mozhayka
- Ozerny
- Poperechnoye
- Shiringa
- Sosnovo-Ozerskoye
- Telemba
- Tselinny
- Tuldun
- Tuzhinka
- Ukyr
- Uldurga
- Ulzyte
- Ust-Egita

== Zaigrayevsky District ==
Rural localities in Zaigrayevsky District:

- Angir
- Atkhatay
- Blok-post imeni Serova
- Chelutay
- Chelutay
- Chelutay
- Dabata
- Darkhhita
- Dede-Tala
- Dobo-Yonkhor
- Erkhirik
- Gorkhon
- Ilka
- Khara-Kutul
- Khara-Shibir
- Khotogor
- Kizha
- Krasny Yar
- Lesozavodskoy
- Mukhor-Tala
- Naryn
- Naryn-Atsagat
- Naryn-Shibir
- Nizhniye Taltsy
- Novaya Bryan
- Novaya Kurba
- Novoilyinsk
- Onokhoy-Shibir
- Pervomayevka
- Petropavlovka
- Shabur
- Shene-Busa
- Shuluta
- Staraya Bryan
- Staraya Kurba
- Stary Onokhoy
- Tarbagatay
- Tarbagatayka
- Tashelan
- Tatarsky Klyuch
- Todogto
- Unegetey
- Ust-Bryan

== Zakamensky District ==
Rural localities in Zakamensky District:

- Bayangol
- Bortoi
- Burguy
- Dalakhay
- Darkhintuy
- Dutulur
- Khamney
- Kharatsay
- Khatsura
- Kholtoson
- Khurtaga
- Khuzhir
- Mikhaylovka
- Myla
- Nurta
- Sanaga
- Shara-Azarga
- Tsagan-Morin
- Tsakir
- Ulekchin
- Ulentuy
- Usanovka
- Ust-Burgaltay
- Utata
- Yekhe-Tsakir
- Yengorboy

== See also ==
- Lists of rural localities in Russia
