= Uldurga =

Uldurga Ульдурга
- Selo
- Location within Republic of Buryatia Location within Russia
- Coordinates: 52°13′N 110°32′E
- Country: Russia
- Region: Republic of Buryatia
- District: Yeravninsky District
- Time zone: UTC+8:00

Uldurga (Russian: Ульдурга; Buryat: Υльдэргэ, Ülderge) is a rural locality (a selo) and the administrative centre of Uldurginskoye Rural Settlement, Yeravninsky District, Republic of Buryatia, Russia. The population was 1,231 as of 2017. There are 23 streets.

== Geography ==
Uldurga is located 88 km southwest of Sosnovo-Ozerskoye (the district's administrative centre) by road. Tuzhinka is the nearest rural locality.
