= Kulsky Stanok =

Kulsky Stanok Кульский Станок
- Selo
- Location within Republic of Buryatia Location within Russia
- Coordinates: 52°10′N 109°36′E
- Country: Russia
- Region: Republic of Buryatia
- District: Khorinsky District
- Time zone: UTC+8:00

Kulsky Stanok (Russian: Кульский Станок; Buryat: Хγлэй Yртөө, Khülei Ürtöö) is a rural locality (a selo) in Khorinsky District, Republic of Buryatia, Russia. The population was 571 as of 2010. There are 12 streets.

== Geography ==
Kulsky Stanok is located 14 km west of Khorinsk (the district's administrative centre) by road. Kulsk is the nearest rural locality.
