= Sharagol =

Sharagol Шарагол
- Selo
- Location within Republic of Buryatia Location within Russia
- Coordinates: 50°01′N 107°20′E
- Country: Russia
- Region: Republic of Buryatia
- District: Kyakhtinsky District
- Time zone: UTC+8:00

Sharagol (Russian: Шарагол; Buryat: Шара гол, Shara gol) is a rural locality (a selo) in Kyakhtinsky District, Republic of Buryatia, Russia. The population was 472 as of 2010. There are 5 streets.

== Geography ==
Sharagol is located 110 km southeast of Kyakhta (the district's administrative centre) by road. Khutor is the nearest rural locality.
