= Shinestuy =

Shinestuy Шинестуй
- Selo
- Location within Republic of Buryatia Location within Russia
- Coordinates: 51°20′N 108°14′E
- Country: Russia
- Region: Republic of Buryatia
- District: Mukhorshibirsky District
- Time zone: UTC+8:00

Shinestuy (Russian: Шинестуй; Buryat: Шэнэhэтэ, Shenehete) is a rural locality (a selo) in Mukhorshibirsky District, Republic of Buryatia, Russia. The population was 96 as of 2010. There are 3 streets.

== Geography ==
Shinestuy is located 64 km northeast of Mukhorshibir (the district's administrative centre) by road. Kusoty is the nearest rural locality.
