= Argada =

Argada Аргада
- Ulus
- Location within Republic of Buryatia Location within Russia
- Coordinates: 54°14′N 110°40′E
- Country: Russia
- Region: Republic of Buryatia
- District: Kurumkansky District
- Time zone: UTC+8:00

Argada (Russian: Аргада; Buryat: Аргата, Argata) is a rural locality (an ulus) in Kurumkansky District, Republic of Buryatia, Russia. The population was 1,687 as of 2010. There are 19 streets.

== Geography ==
Argada is located 45 km southeast of Kurumkan (the district's administrative centre) by road. Ilichkin is the nearest rural locality.
