= Edermeg =

Edermeg Эдэрмэг
- Selo
- Location within Republic of Buryatia Location within Russia
- Coordinates: 51°41′N 109°39′E
- Country: Russia
- Region: Republic of Buryatia
- District: Kizhinginsky District
- Time zone: UTC+8:00

Edermeg (Russian: Эдэрмэг) is a rural locality (a selo) in Kizhinginsky District, Republic of Buryatia, Russia. The population was 514 as of 2010. There are 7 streets.

== Geography ==
Edermeg is located 26 km southwest of Kizhinga (the district's administrative centre) by road. Leonovka is the nearest rural locality.
