= Kotokel =

Kotokel Котокель
- Settlement
- Location within Republic of Buryatia Location within Russia
- Coordinates: 52°45′N 108°04′E
- Country: Russia
- Region: Republic of Buryatia
- District: Pribaykalsky District
- Time zone: UTC+8:00

Kotokel (Russian: Котокель) is a rural locality (a settlement) in Pribaykalsky District, Republic of Buryatia, Russia. The population was 145 as of 2010. There is 1 street.

== Geography ==
Kotokel is located on the southwestern shore of Lake Kotokel, 7.5 km (4.7 mi) southwest of the Turka River mouth. The lake is separated from the Baikal Lake shore by a 2 km (1.2 mi) wide stretch of land.
