= Bodon, Republic of Buryatia =

Bodon Бодон
- Selo
- Location within Republic of Buryatia Location within Russia
- Coordinates: 53°42′N 110°05′E
- Country: Russia
- Region: Republic of Buryatia
- District: Barguzinsky District
- Time zone: UTC+8:00

Bodon (Russian: Бодон) is a rural locality (a selo) in Barguzinsky District, Republic of Buryatia, Russia. The population was 234 as of 2010. There are 5 streets.

== Geography ==
Bodon is located 51 km northeast of Barguzin (the district's administrative centre) by road. Suvo is the nearest rural locality.
