= Kharyasta =

Kharyasta Харьяста
- Ulus
- Location within Republic of Buryatia Location within Russia
- Coordinates: 50°43′N 106°38′E
- Country: Russia
- Region: Republic of Buryatia
- District: Kyakhtinsky District
- Time zone: UTC+8:00

Kharyasta (Russian: Харьяста) is a rural locality (an ulus) in Kyakhtinsky District, Republic of Buryatia, Russia. The population was 18 as of 2010. There is 1 street.

== Geography ==
Kharyasta is located 47 km north of Kyakhta (the district's administrative centre) by road. Novodesyatnikovo is the nearest rural locality.
