= Kodunsky Stanok =

Kodunsky Stanok Кодунский Станок
- Ulus
- Location within Republic of Buryatia Location within Russia
- Coordinates: 52°02′N 109°45′E
- Country: Russia
- Region: Republic of Buryatia
- District: Kizhinginsky District
- Time zone: UTC+8:00

Kodunsky Stanok (Russian: Кодунский Станок; Buryat: Худанай Yртөө, Khudanai Ürtöö) is a rural locality (an ulus) in Kizhinginsky District, Republic of Buryatia, Russia. The population was 168 as of 2010. There are 3 streets.

== Geography ==
Kodunsky Stanok is located 26 km northwest of Kizhinga (the district's administrative centre) by road. Ust-Orot is the nearest rural locality.
