= Khangir =

Khangir Хангир
- Selo
- Location within Republic of Buryatia Location within Russia
- Coordinates: 52°21′N 110°53′E
- Country: Russia
- Region: Republic of Buryatia
- District: Yeravninsky District
- Time zone: UTC+8:00

Khangir (Russian: Хангир) is a rural locality (a selo) in Yeravninsky District, Republic of Buryatia, Russia. The population was 73 as of 2010. There is 1 street.
