= Dobo-Yonkhor =

Dobo-Yonkhor Добо-Ёнхор
- Ulus
- Location within Republic of Buryatia Location within Russia
- Coordinates: 52°00′N 108°09′E
- Country: Russia
- Region: Republic of Buryatia
- District: Zaigrayevsky District
- Time zone: UTC+8:00

Dobo-Yonkhor (Russian: Добо-Ёнхор) is a rural locality (an ulus) in Zaigrayevsky District, Republic of Buryatia, Russia. The population was 122 as of 2010. There are 5 streets.

== Geography ==
Dobo-Yonkhor is located 33 km north of Zaigrayevo (the district's administrative centre) by road. Stary Onokhoy is the nearest rural locality.
