= Angir, Pribaykalsky District, Republic of Buryatia =

Angir Ангир
- Selo
- Location within Republic of Buryatia Location within Russia
- Coordinates: 52°16′N 107°51′E
- Country: Russia
- Region: Republic of Buryatia
- District: Pribaykalsky District
- Time zone: UTC+8:00

Angir (Russian: Ангир) is a rural locality (a selo) in Pribaykalsky District, Republic of Buryatia, Russia. The population was 229 as of 2010. There is one street.
