= Tomokto =

Tomokto Томокто
- Ulus
- Location within Republic of Buryatia Location within Russia
- Coordinates: 54°17′N 110°34′E
- Country: Russia
- Region: Republic of Buryatia
- District: Kurumkansky District
- Time zone: UTC+8:00

Tomokto (Russian: Томокто) is a rural locality (an ulus) in Kurumkansky District, Republic of Buryatia, Russia. The population was 36 as of 2010. There are 9 streets.

== Geography ==
Tomokto is located 36 km southeast of Kurumkan (the district's administrative centre) by road. Argada is the nearest rural locality.
