= Kharbyaty =

Kharbyaty Харбяты
- Selo
- Location within Republic of Buryatia Location within Russia
- Coordinates: 51°40′N 102°16′E
- Country: Russia
- Region: Republic of Buryatia
- District: Tunkinsky District
- Time zone: UTC+8:00

Kharbyaty (Russian: Харбяты; Buryat: Харбяангууд, Kharbiaanguud) is a rural locality (a selo) in Tunkinsky District, Republic of Buryatia, Russia. The population was 551 as of 2010. There are 17 streets.

== Geography ==
Kharbyaty is located 11 km east of Kyren (the district's administrative centre) by road. Maly Zhemchug is the nearest rural locality.
