= Ubur-Kiret =

Ubur-Kiret Убур-Киреть
- Selo
- Location within Republic of Buryatia Location within Russia
- Coordinates: 50°17′N 107°15′E
- Country: Russia
- Region: Republic of Buryatia
- District: Kyakhtinsky District
- Time zone: UTC+8:00

Ubur-Kiret (Russian: Убур-Киреть) is a rural locality (a selo) in Kyakhtinsky District, Republic of Buryatia, Russia. The population was 292 as of 2010. There are 4 streets.

== Geography ==
Ubur-Kiret is located 78 km southeast of Kyakhta (the district's administrative centre) by road. Ungurkuy is the nearest rural locality.
