= Aninsk =

Aninsk Анинск
- Ulus
- Location within Republic of Buryatia Location within Russia
- Coordinates: 52°11′N 109°50′E
- Country: Russia
- Region: Republic of Buryatia
- District: Khorinsky District
- Time zone: UTC+8:00

Aninsk (Russian: Анинск; Buryat: Анаа, Anaa) is a rural locality (an ulus) in Khorinsky District, Republic of Buryatia, Russia. The population was 270 as of 2010. There are 10 streets.

== Geography ==
Aninsk is located 6 km northeast of Khorinsk (the district's administrative centre) by road. Khorinsk is the nearest rural locality.
