= Khilgantuy =

Khilgantuy Хилгантуй
- Ulus
- Location within Republic of Buryatia Location within Russia
- Coordinates: 50°26′N 106°53′E
- Country: Russia
- Region: Republic of Buryatia
- District: Kyakhtinsky District
- Time zone: UTC+8:00

Khilgantuy (Russian: Хилгантуй; Buryat: Хилганта, Khilganta) is a rural locality (an ulus) in Kyakhtinsky District, Republic of Buryatia, Russia. The population was 161 as of 2010. There are 6 streets.

== Geography ==
Khilgantuy is located 77 km northeast of Kyakhta (the district's administrative centre) by road. Ust-Kiran is the nearest rural locality.
