= Talovka (settlement), Republic of Buryatia =

Talovka Таловка
- Settlement
- Location within Republic of Buryatia Location within Russia
- Coordinates: 52°06′N 107°08′E
- Country: Russia
- Region: Republic of Buryatia
- District: Pribaykalsky District
- Time zone: UTC+8:00

Talovka (Russian: Таловка) is a rural locality (a settlement) in Pribaykalsky District, Republic of Buryatia, Russia. The population was 1,956 as of 2010. There are 22 streets.
