= Zorino, Republic of Buryatia =

Zorino Зорино
- Selo
- Location within Republic of Buryatia Location within Russia
- Coordinates: 53°30′N 109°21′E
- Country: Russia
- Region: Republic of Buryatia
- District: Barguzinsky District
- Time zone: UTC+8:00

Zorino (Russian: Зорино) is a rural locality (a selo) in Barguzinsky District, Republic of Buryatia, Russia. The population was 68 as of 2010. There are 2 streets.

== Geography ==
Zorino is located 24 km southwest of Barguzin (the district's administrative centre) by road. Zhuravlikha is the nearest rural locality.
