= Kardon, Republic of Buryatia =

Kardon Кардон
- Selo
- Location within Republic of Buryatia Location within Russia
- Coordinates: 51°36′N 107°22′E
- Country: Russia
- Region: Republic of Buryatia
- District: Tarbagataysky District
- Time zone: UTC+8:00

Kardon (Russian: Кардон) is a rural locality (a selo) in Tarbagataysky District, Republic of Buryatia, Russia. The population was 164 as of 2010. There are 6 streets.

== Geography ==
Kardon is located 15 km north of Tarbagatay (the district's administrative centre) by road. Shaluty is the nearest rural locality.
