= Itantsa =

Itantsa Итанца
- Settlement
- Location within Republic of Buryatia Location within Russia
- Coordinates: 52°09′N 107°29′E
- Country: Russia
- Region: Republic of Buryatia
- District: Pribaykalsky District
- Time zone: UTC+8:00

Itantsa (Russian: Итанца) is a rural locality (a settlement) in Pribaykalsky District, Republic of Buryatia, Russia. The population was 1,022 as of 2010. There are 23 streets.

== Geography ==
Itantsa is located 12 km southwest of Turuntayevo (the district's administrative centre) by road. Koma is the nearest rural locality.
