= Sukhoy Ruchey =

Sukhoy Ruchey Сухой Ручей
- Selo
- Location within Republic of Buryatia Location within Russia
- Coordinates: 50°32′N 107°30′E
- Country: Russia
- Region: Republic of Buryatia
- District: Bichursky District
- Time zone: UTC+8:00

Sukhoy Ruchey (Russian: Сухой Ручей) is a rural locality (a selo) in Bichursky District, Republic of Buryatia, Russia. The population was 325 as of 2010. There are 3 streets.

== Geography ==
Sukhoy Ruchey is located 18 km southwest of Bichura (the district's administrative centre) by road. Dunda-Kiret is the nearest rural locality.
