= Dunguy =

Dunguy Дунгуй
- Selo
- Location within Republic of Buryatia Location within Russia
- Coordinates: 50°09′N 107°33′E
- Country: Russia
- Region: Republic of Buryatia
- District: Kyakhtinsky District
- Time zone: UTC+8:00

Dunguy (Russian: Дунгуй) is a rural locality (a selo) in Kyakhtinsky District, Republic of Buryatia, Russia. The population was 176 as of 2010.

== Geography ==
Dunguy is located 103 km (64 miles) southeast of Kyakhta (the district's administrative centre) by road. Ulady is the nearest rural locality.
