= Amgalanta =

Amgalanta Амгаланта
- Ulus
- Location within Republic of Buryatia Location within Russia
- Coordinates: 52°23′N 110°23′E
- Country: Russia
- Region: Republic of Buryatia
- District: Khorinsky District
- Time zone: UTC+8:00

Amgalanta (Russian: Амгаланта) is a rural locality (an ulus) in Khorinsky District, Republic of Buryatia, Russia. The population was 218 as of 2010. There are 5 streets.

== Geography ==
Amgalanta is located 54 km northeast of Khorinsk (the district's administrative centre) by road. Georgiyevskoye is the nearest rural locality.
