= Oymur =

Oymur Оймур
- Selo
- Location within Republic of Buryatia Location within Russia
- Coordinates: 52°19′N 106°50′E
- Country: Russia
- Region: Republic of Buryatia
- District: Kabansky District
- Time zone: UTC+8:00

Oymur (Russian: Оймур; Buryat: Оймуур, Oimuur) is a rural locality (a selo) in Kabansky District, Republic of Buryatia, Russia. The population was 1,380 as of 2010. There are 17 streets.

== Geography ==
Oymur is located 63 km north of Kabansk (the district's administrative centre) by road. Dubinino is the nearest rural locality.
