= Mengey =

Mengey Мэнгэй
- Ulus
- Location within Republic of Buryatia Location within Russia
- Coordinates: 51°00′N 106°55′E
- Country: Russia
- Region: Buryatia
- District: Selenginsky District

Population (2010)
  - Total: 13
- Time zone: UTC+8:00

Mengey (Russian: Мэнгэй) is a rural locality (an ulus) in Selenginsky District, Republic of Buryatia, Russia. The population was 13 as of 2010. There is 1 street.
