= Novosretenka =

Novosretenka Новосретенка
- Selo
- Location within Republic of Buryatia Location within Russia
- Coordinates: 50°43′N 107°40′E
- Country: Russia
- Region: Republic of Buryatia
- District: Bichursky District
- Time zone: UTC+8:00

Novosretenka (Russian: Новосретенка) is a rural locality (a selo) in Bichursky District, Republic of Buryatia, Russia. The population was 573 as of 2010. There are 3 streets.

== Geography ==
Novosretenka is located 20 km northeast of Bichura (the district's administrative centre) by road. Motnya is the nearest rural locality.
