= Orongoy (ulus) =

Orongoy Оронгой
- Ulus
- Location within Republic of Buryatia Location within Russia
- Coordinates: 51°31′N 107°04′E
- Country: Russia
- Region: Republic of Buryatia
- District: Ivolginsky District
- Time zone: UTC+8:00

Orongoy (Russian: Оронгой; Buryat: Оронго, Orongo) is a rural locality (an ulus) in Ivolginsky District, Republic of Buryatia, Russia. The population was 1,760 as of 2010. There are 5 streets.
