= Sherashovo =

Sherashovo Шерашово
- Selo
- Location within Republic of Buryatia Location within Russia
- Coordinates: 52°15′N 106°42′E
- Country: Russia
- Region: Republic of Buryatia
- District: Kabansky District
- Time zone: UTC+8:00

Sherashovo (Russian: Шерашово) is a rural locality (a selo) in Kabansky District, Republic of Buryatia, Russia. The population was 150 as of 2010.

== Geography ==
Sherashovo is located 51 km northeast of Kabansk (the district's administrative centre) by road. Inkino is the nearest rural locality.
