= Yelovka, Tunkinsky District, Republic of Buryatia =

Yelovka Еловка
- Selo
- Location within Republic of Buryatia Location within Russia
- Coordinates: 51°45′N 102°45′E
- Country: Russia
- Region: Republic of Buryatia
- District: Tunkinsky District
- Time zone: UTC+8:00

Yelovka (Russian: Еловка) is a rural locality (a selo) in Tunkinsky District, Republic of Buryatia, Russia. The population was 260 as of 2010. There are 6 streets.

== Geography ==
Yelovka is located 55 km east of Kyren (the district's administrative centre) by road. Akhalik is the nearest rural locality.
