= Tataurovo =

Tataurovo Татаурово
- Settlement
- Location within Republic of Buryatia Location within Russia
- Coordinates: 52°08′N 107°26′E
- Country: Russia
- Region: Republic of Buryatia
- District: Pribaykalsky District
- Time zone: UTC+8:00

Tataurovo (Russian: Татаурово; Buryat: Татуур, Tatuur) is a rural locality (a settlement) in Pribaykalsky District, Republic of Buryatia, Russia. The population was 1,810 as of 2010. There are 22 streets.

== Geography ==
Tataurovo is located 18 km southwest of Turuntayevo (the district's administrative centre) by road. Ostrog is the nearest rural locality.
