= Tvorogovo =

Tvorogovo Творогово
- Selo
- Location within Republic of Buryatia Location within Russia
- Coordinates: 52°10′N 106°29′E
- Country: Russia
- Region: Republic of Buryatia
- District: Kabansky District
- Time zone: UTC+8:00

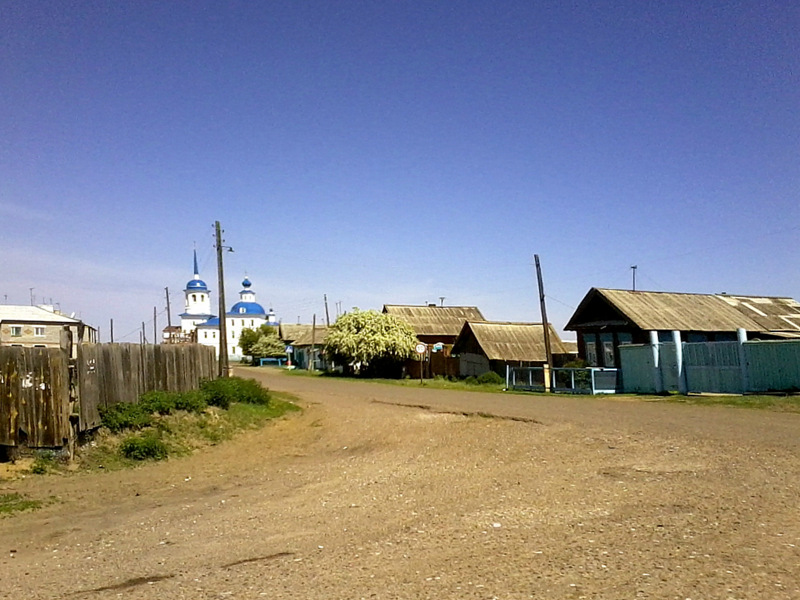
Tvorogovo

Tvorogovo (Russian: Творогово) is a rural locality (a selo) in Kabansky District, Republic of Buryatia, Russia. The population was 669 as of 2010. There are 6 streets.
