= Makarinino =

Makarinino Макаринино
- Selo
- Location within Republic of Buryatia Location within Russia
- Coordinates: 53°26′N 109°06′E
- Country: Russia
- Region: Republic of Buryatia
- District: Barguzinsky District
- Time zone: UTC+8:00

Makarinino (Russian: Макаринино) is a rural locality (a selo) in Barguzinsky District, Republic of Buryatia, Russia. The population was 293 as of 2010. There are 2 streets.

== Geography ==
Makarinino is located 43 km southwest of Barguzin (the district's administrative centre) by road. Ust-Barguzin is the nearest rural locality.
