= Oshurkovo =

Oshurkovo Ошурково
- Selo
- Location within Republic of Buryatia Location within Russia
- Coordinates: 51°57′N 107°28′E
- Country: Russia
- Region: Republic of Buryatia
- District: Ivolginsky District
- Time zone: UTC+8:00

Oshurkovo (Russian: Ошурково) is a rural locality (a selo) in Ivolginsky District, Republic of Buryatia, Russia. The population was 427 as of 2010. There are 15 streets.

== Geography ==
Oshurkovo is located 38 km northeast of Ivolginsk (the district's administrative centre) by road. Mostovoy is the nearest rural locality.
