= Baragkhan =

Human settlement in Kurumkansky District, Republic of Buryatia, Russia

Baragkhan Барагхан
- Settlement
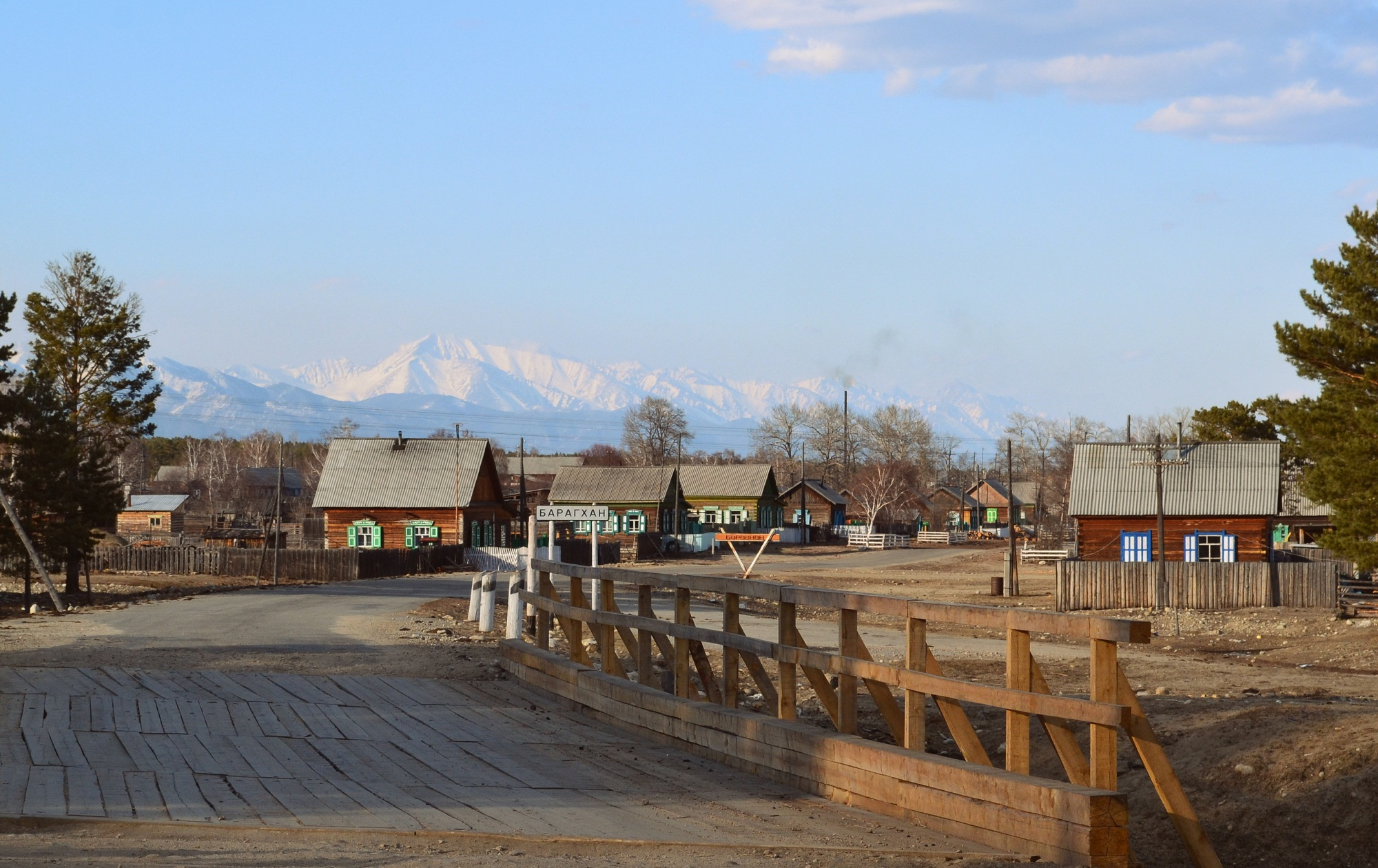
- Street in Baragkhan

- Location within Republic of Buryatia Location within Russia
- Coordinates: 54°8′58″N 110°9′41″E
- Country: Russia
- Region: Republic of Buryatia
- District: Kurumkansky District
- Time zone: UTC+8:00

Baragkhan (Russian: Барагхан; Buryat: Бархан, Barkhan) is a rural locality (a selo) in Kurumkansky District of the Republic of Buryatia, Russia. Population: 1,098 (2010 census); 1,144 (2002 census);
