= Chelutay =

Chelutay Челутай
- Settlement
- Location within Republic of Buryatia Location within Russia
- Coordinates: 51°38′N 108°24′E
- Country: Russia
- Region: Republic of Buryatia
- District: Zaigrayevsky District
- Time zone: UTC+8:00

Chelutay (Russian: Челутай; Buryat: Шулуута, Shuluuta) is a rural locality (a settlement) in Zaigrayevsky District, Republic of Buryatia, Russia. The population was 458 as of 2010. There are 7 streets.
