= Listvennichnoye =

Listvennichnoye Лиственничное
- Selo
- Location within Republic of Buryatia Location within Russia
- Coordinates: 52°10′N 107°31′E
- Country: Russia
- Region: Republic of Buryatia
- District: Pribaykalsky District
- Time zone: UTC+8:00

Listvennichnoye (Russian: Лиственничное) is a rural locality (a selo) in Pribaykalsky District, Republic of Buryatia, Russia. The population was 161 as of 2010. There are 5 streets.

== Geography ==
Listvennichnoye is located 11 km southwest of Turuntayevo (the district's administrative centre) by road. Itantsa is the nearest rural locality.
