= Samarta =

Samarta Самарта
- Settlement
- Location within Republic of Buryatia Location within Russia
- Coordinates: 52°06′N 101°08′E
- Country: Russia
- Region: Republic of Buryatia
- District: Okinsky District
- Time zone: UTC+8:00

Samarta (Russian: Самарта; Buryat: Һамарта, Hamarta) is a rural locality (a settlement) in Okinsky District, Republic of Buryatia, Russia. The population was 3 as of 2010. There are 2 streets.
