= Ganzurino =

Ganzurino Ганзурино
- Selo
- Location within Republic of Buryatia Location within Russia
- Coordinates: 51°31′N 107°14′E
- Country: Russia
- Region: Republic of Buryatia
- District: Ivolginsky District
- Time zone: UTC+8:00

Ganzurino (Russian: Ганзурино) is a rural locality (a selo) in Ivolginsky District, Republic of Buryatia, Russia. The population was 429 as of 2010. There are 4 streets.

== Geography ==
Ganzurino is located 46 km south of Ivolginsk (the district's administrative centre) by road. Zun-Orongoy is the nearest rural locality.
