= Dalakhay =

Bayangol Далахай
- Ulus
- Location within Republic of Buryatia Location within Russia
- Coordinates: 50°53′N 102°53′E
- Country: Russia
- Region: Republic of Buryatia
- District: Zakamensky District
- Time zone: UTC+8:00

Dalakhay (Russian: Далахай) is a rural locality (an ulus) in Zakamensky District, Republic of Buryatia, Russia. The population was 427 as of 2010. There are 5 streets.

== Geography ==
Dalakhay is located 102 km north of Zakamensk (the district's administrative centre) by road. Sanaga is the nearest rural locality.
