= Tokhoryukta =

Tokhoryukta Тохорюкта
- Ulus
- Location within Republic of Buryatia Location within Russia
- Coordinates: 52°33′N 109°17′E
- Country: Russia
- Region: Republic of Buryatia
- District: Khorinsky District
- Time zone: UTC+8:00

Tokhoryukta (Russian: Тохорюкта; Buryat: Тохорюугта, Tokhoriuugta) is a rural locality (an ulus) in Khorinsky District, Republic of Buryatia, Russia. The population was 251 as of 2010. There are 2 streets.

== Geography ==
Tokhoryukta is located 126 km northwest of Khorinsk (the district's administrative centre) by road. Barun-Khasurta is the nearest rural locality.
