= Dede-Sutoy =

Dede-Sutoy Дэдэ-Сутой
- Ulus
- Location within Republic of Buryatia Location within Russia
- Coordinates: 51°15′N 106°51′E
- Country: Russia
- Region: Republic of Buryatia
- District: Selenginsky District
- Time zone: UTC+8:00

Dede-Sutoy (Russian: Дэдэ-Сутой; Buryat: Дээдэ Сγтэй, Deede Sütei) is a rural locality (an ulus) in Selenginsky District, Republic of Buryatia, Russia. The population was 360 as of 2010.

== Geography ==
Dede-Sutoy is located 33 km east of Gusinoozyorsk (the district's administrative centre) by road. Tokhoy is the nearest rural locality.
