= Shuluta, Tunkinsky District, Republic of Buryatia =

Shuluta Шулута
- Ulus
- Location within Republic of Buryatia Location within Russia
- Coordinates: 51°47′56″N 103°08′10″E
- Country: Russia
- Region: Republic of Buryatia
- District: Tunkinsky District
- Time zone: UTC+8:00

Shuluta (Russian: Шулута; Buryat: Шулуута, Shuluuta) is a rural locality (an ulus) in Tunkinsky District, Republic of Buryatia, Russia. The population was 440 as of 2010. There are 15 streets.
