= Yartsy =

Yartsy Ярцы
- Settlement
- Location within Republic of Buryatia Location within Russia
- Coordinates: 52°52′N 108°08′E
- Country: Russia
- Region: Republic of Buryatia
- District: Pribaykalsky District
- Time zone: UTC+8:00

Yartsy (Russian: Ярцы) is a rural locality (a settlement) in Pribaykalsky District, Republic of Buryatia, Russia. The population was 80 as of 2010. There is 1 street.

== Geography ==
Yartsy is located 105 km north of Turuntayevo (the district's administrative centre) by road. Turka is the nearest rural locality.
