= Urzhil =

Urzhil Уржил
- Ulus
- Location within Republic of Buryatia Location within Russia
- Coordinates: 53°50′N 110°21′E
- Country: Russia
- Region: Republic of Buryatia
- District: Barguzinsky District
- Time zone: UTC+8:00

Urzhil (Russian: Уржил) is a rural locality (an ulus) in Barguzinsky District, Republic of Buryatia, Russia. The population was 211 as of 2010. There are 3 streets.
