= Sharalday =

Sharalday Шаралдай
- Selo
- Location within Republic of Buryatia Location within Russia
- Coordinates: 51°01′N 107°38′E
- Country: Russia
- Region: Republic of Buryatia
- District: Mukhorshibirsky District
- Time zone: UTC+8:00

Sharalday (Russian: Шаралдай) is a rural locality (a selo) in Mukhorshibirsky District, Republic of Buryatia, Russia. The population was 1,414 as of 2010. There are 9 streets.

== Geography ==
Sharalday is located 17 km west of Mukhorshibir (the district's administrative centre) by road. Novy Zagan is the nearest rural locality.
