= Ulbugay =

Ulbugay Улбугай
- Ulus
- Location within Republic of Buryatia Location within Russia
- Coordinates: 51°48′N 102°18′E
- Country: Russia
- Region: Republic of Buryatia
- District: Tunkinsky District
- Time zone: UTC+8:00

Ulbugay (Russian: Улбугай; Buryat: Улбагай, Ulbagai) is a rural locality (an ulus) in Tunkinsky District, Republic of Buryatia, Russia. The population was 92 as of 2010. There are 5 streets.

== Geography ==
Ulbugay is located 62 km northeast of Kyren (the district's administrative centre) by road. Tagarkhay is the nearest rural locality.
