= Kargino, Republic of Buryatia =

Kargino Каргино
- Selo
- Location within Republic of Buryatia Location within Russia
- Coordinates: 52°05′N 106°35′E
- Country: Russia
- Region: Republic of Buryatia
- District: Kabansky District
- Time zone: UTC+8:00

Kargino (Russian: Каргино) is a rural locality (a selo) in Kabansky District, Republic of Buryatia, Russia. The population was 89 as of 2010. There is 1 street.

== Geography ==
Kargino is located 6 km northwest of Kabansk (the district's administrative centre) by road. Kabansk is the nearest rural locality.
