= Bortoi =

Bortoi Бортой
- Selo
- Location within Republic of Buryatia Location within Russia
- Coordinates: 50°42′N 103°28′E
- Country: Russia
- Region: Republic of Buryatia
- District: Zakamensky District
- Time zone: UTC+8:00

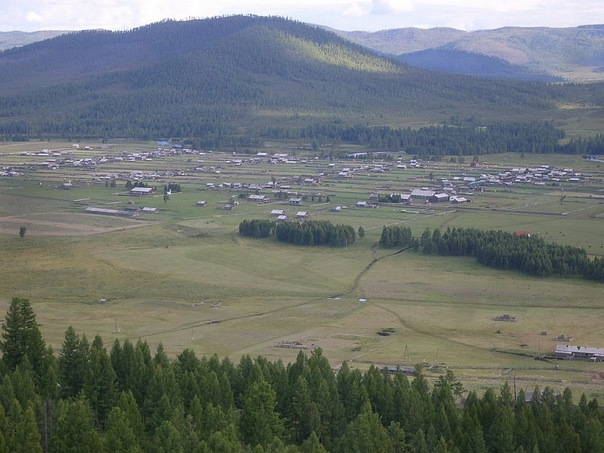
The village of Bortoi. Mountain view

Bortoi (Russian: Бортой; Buryat: Борто, Borto) is a village in the Zakamensky district of Buryatia, Russia.

== Geographical location ==
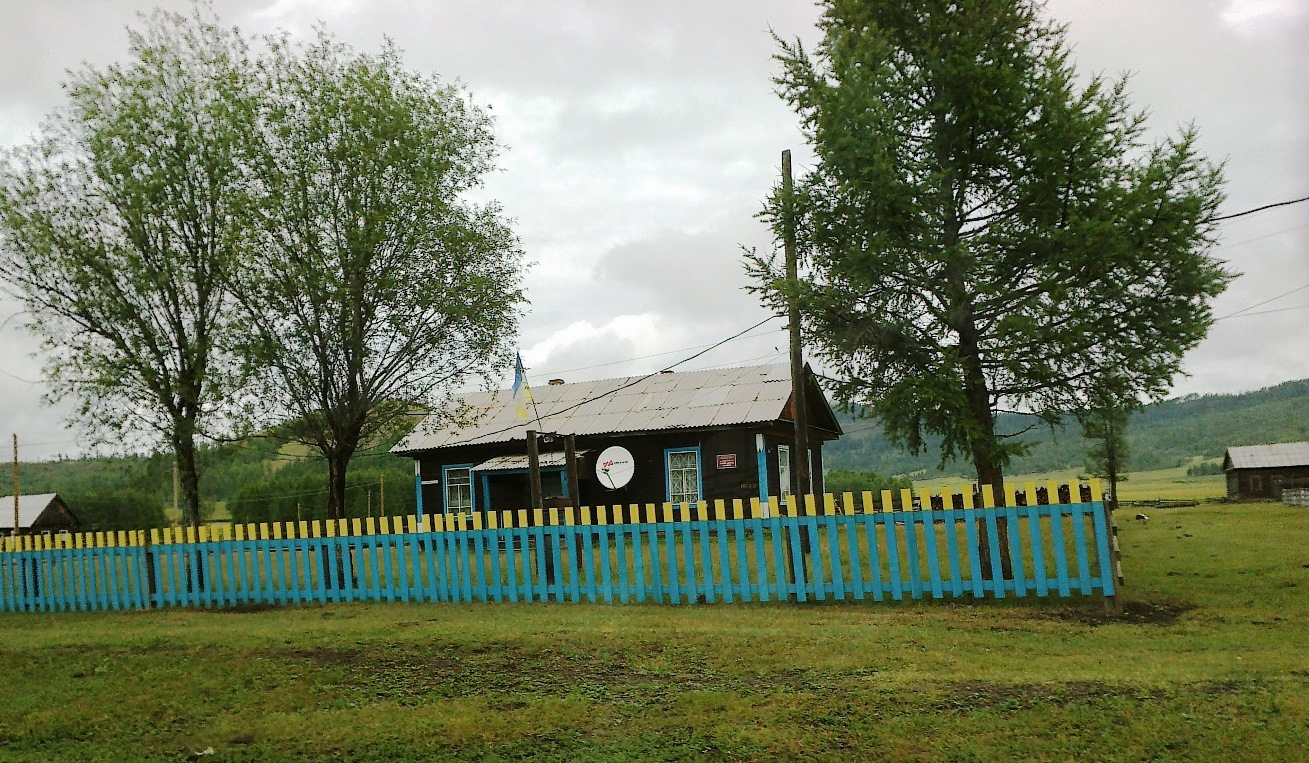
Village administration

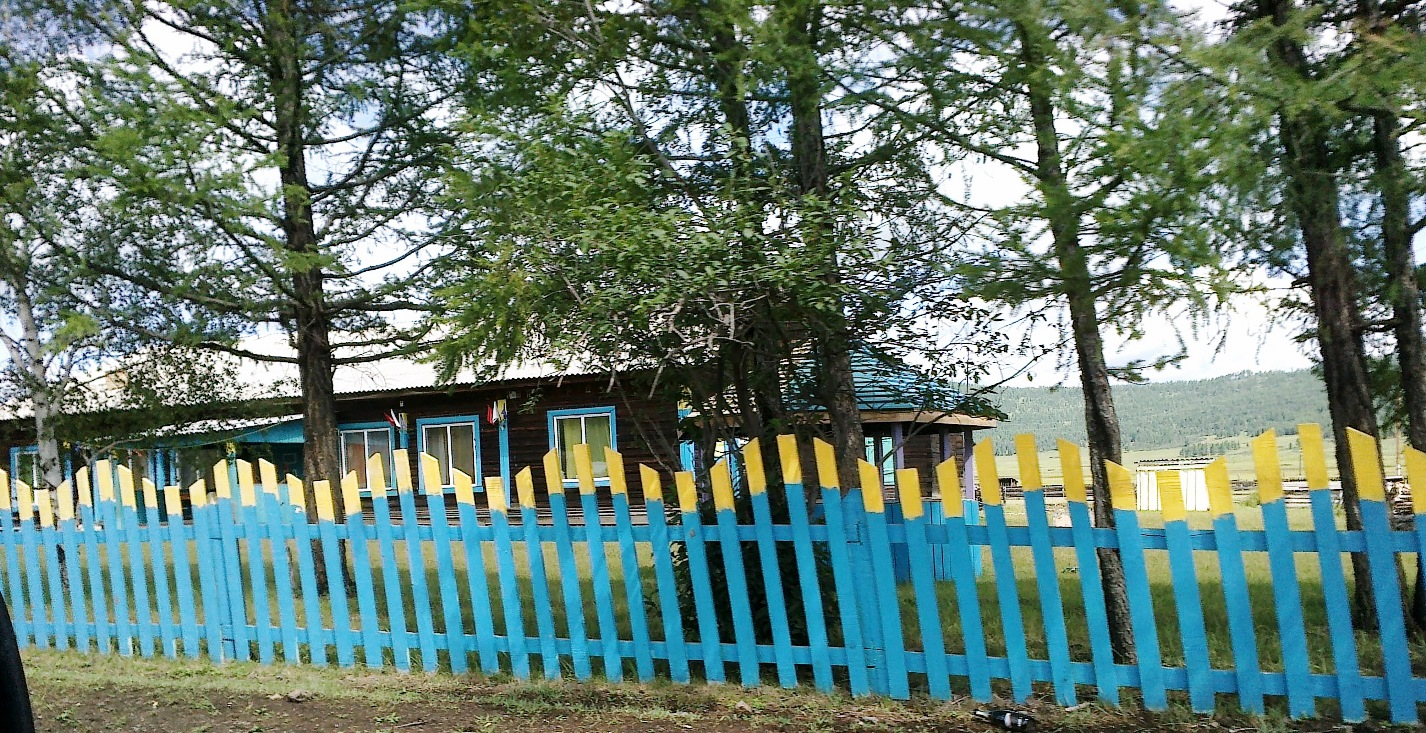
House of Culture

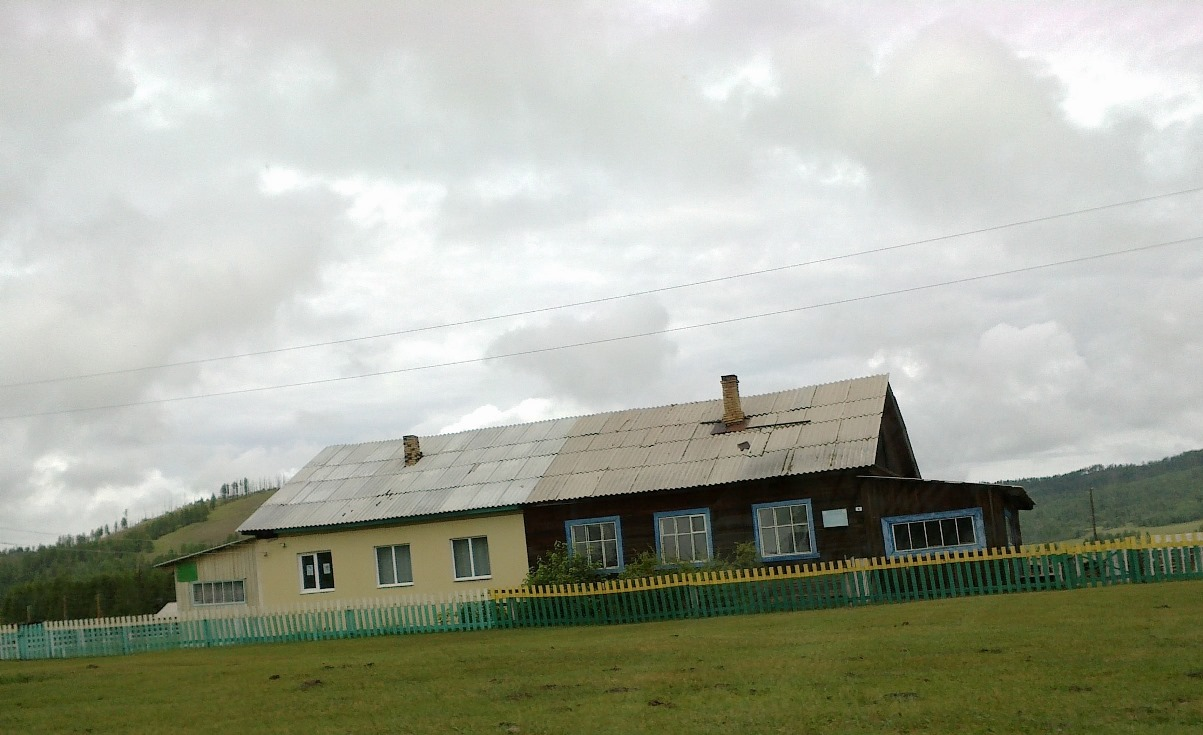
Library (right) and paramedic point (left)

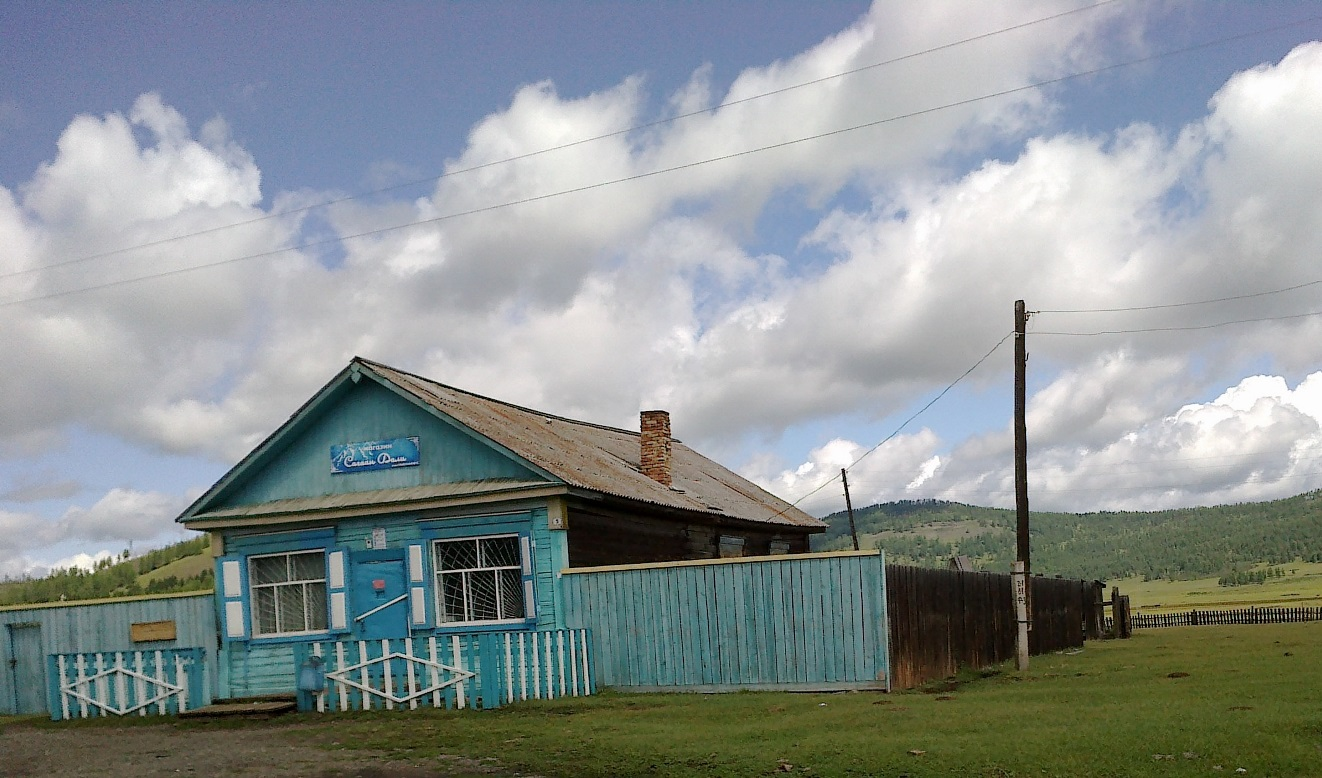
Score

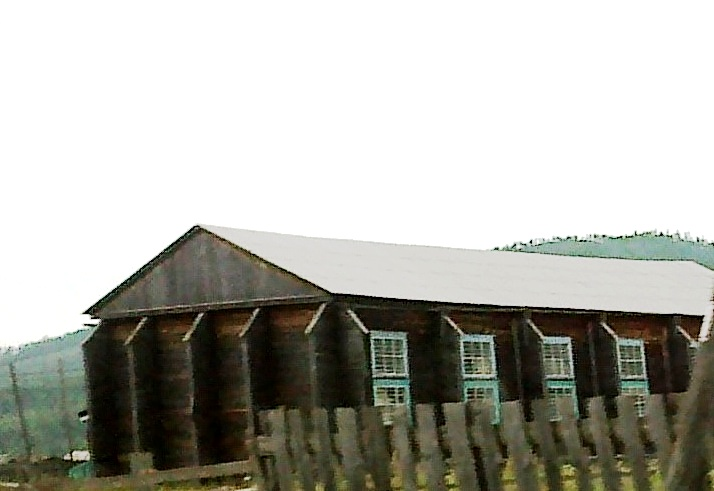
School gym

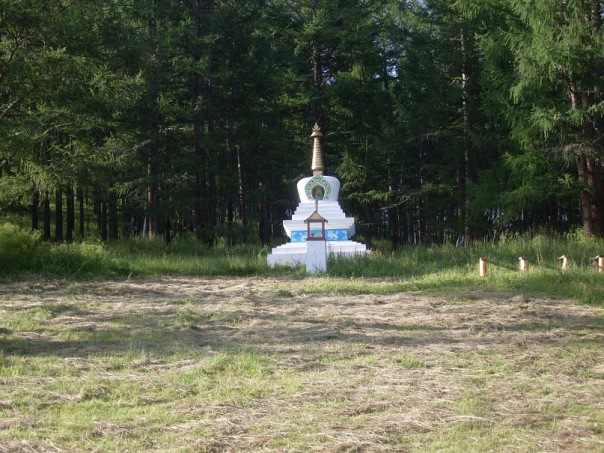
Suburgan (Buddhist stupa)

Bortoi is located in a mountainous taiga area, north of the Zakamensk-Ulan-Ude highway. The distance from the district center, the city of Zakamensk, is 62 km. The distance to the city of Ulan-Ude by road is 422 km.

Near the ulus flows the river Nuud. On board, along with Bayangol, Myla and Tsagan-Morin, is included in the "northern bush" of Zakamensky district.

=== Climate ===
The climate is sharply continental, mainly frozen soils prevail, which thaw by August 120–150 cm, and in some places up to 5–20 cm, with an average annual temperature of −5.

The winter months are very cold, with little snow. Spring is windy with little rainfall. Summer is short, with heavy rainfall in July and August, evenings are cool.

=== Name ===
According to the first version, in these places one rich man with his herd fell under heavy rain, “boron” - in translation from Buryat it means “rain”.

However, some argue that from the word boroto - "clay".

The third version is named after Genghis Khan's wife, Borte.

According to the fourth version - by the name of Monhe's son - Bortoon. Munhe himself arrived in these parts to guard duty at the border, and initially lived with his family in the Nurta area.

The founding date of the ulus is unknown [2].

=== History ===
One of Munhe's sons, named Uyaa, began to live on the site of modern Bortoy, he had five sons: Rampil, Mogtoo, Namkhan, Bagshakhan and Oshor, and they became the ancestors of the Horthuds of Bortoi.

In 1930, the peasants of the ulus united in the collective farm to them. Kalinin. In 1955, after merging with the Yerbanov collective farm, a new collective farm, Rodina, was formed.

In 1968, the flight crews merged with the Mylinsky collective farm and the Bayangolsky state farm was formed. In 1972, the state farm was renamed the state farm named after the 50th anniversary of the USSR. In the 1990s, the state farm broke up into several peasant farms.

Until 1993, the Bortoi ulus was part of the Tsagan-Morinsky village council. In the same year, an independent Bortoy somon administration was formed.

In 2006, the local somon administration was transformed into the municipality of the rural settlement "Bortoyskoye" [3].

=== Population ===
274 people live in the village.

=== Infrastructure ===
Currently, the ulus has 75 yards. There are three CBTs.

The main employer in the ulus is the secondary school and kindergarten "Narakhan".

The first school in Borto was built in 1944. Before that, students had to go to school in the neighboring Soap Ulus.

In 1965, a new building was built for the school, and in 1998, a sports hall by the method of folk construction.

In the 1970s, the House of Culture and the village library were built in Bortoye, the book fund of which currently amounts to about 5 thousand copies.

In 2011, after a small fire, the reconstruction of the House of Culture was carried out. Now there, in addition to cultural and official events, residents of the ulus hold weddings and anniversaries.

In the ulus there is also a feldsher-midwife station and a shop.

=== Economy ===
The bulk of the population of Bortoi is engaged in agriculture on a personal farmstead. There are 7 farms near the ulus.

The area of agricultural land is 1442 hectares, of which 1142 hectares are pastures and hayfields.

=== Dugan ===
In the 1920s, a Buddhist temple, Dugan, was built in Bortoi. His first rector was Lama Tseden Bazarov, a native of Aga. Bazarov was a well-educated man, knew Mongolian and Chinese. After studying in Tibet, he received the title "Maaranba". In those years, the Bortoysky Dugan was one of the largest in the Zakamensky district. In the 1930s, the dugan was completely destroyed, Lama Bazarov was repressed.

In 1992, residents of the ulus began the construction of a new Dugan, which was completed three years later. On July 8, 1995, a new Dugan was consecrated by Buddhist lamas [11].

Two Buddhist stupas, suburgan, were also erected in Bortoye.

=== Arshan Ulhansag ===
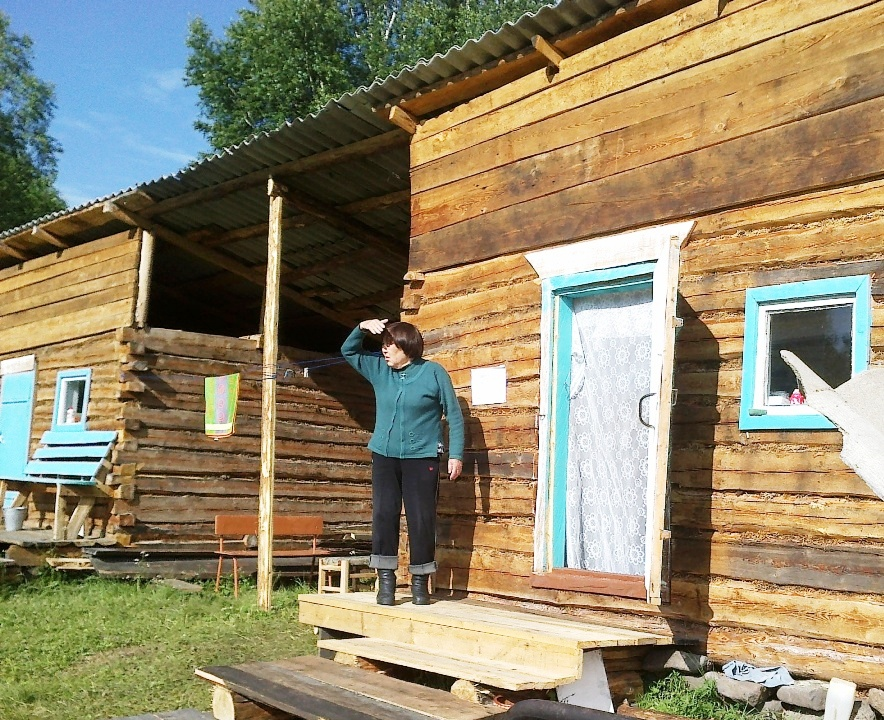
Summer house in Ulhansag

Bortoi is also known for its healing spring Ulhansag, located 3 km from the ulus, in the area of Sur-Dur. This area is considered sacred for a long time. Buddhist lamas constantly lived here, who prayed daily and thanked heaven for their generosity in favor of people suffering from various ailments.

Although analyzes from sources were not carried out and it is not known about their beneficial properties, arshan itself is very popular not only among residents of nearby villages, but also among residents of the entire region. They come to rest in Ulhansag and from other areas and the city of Ulan-Ude.

A source in Ulhansag help with diseases of the joints, kidneys, gastrointestinal tract, infertility.

Since 2011, close to old summer houses with private funds, construction of new houses more convenient for living has been underway (see photo). In the summer of 2015, 7 houses were built in Ulhansag in this way.

=== Natural resources ===
The territory of the Bortoi ulus is located in the mountainous taiga region, in the risky farming zone.

==== Flora and Funga ====
The flora around Bortoy is species-rich. The area's forests are dominated by larch, birch, cedar (Siberian pine), and spruce. The undergrowth features lingonberry, bilberry, wild strawberry, and blackcurrant. The region is also abundant with wild mushrooms, including boletes, butter mushrooms, and chanterelles.

==== Fauna ====
The taiga around the ulus is full of diverse representatives of the animal world. Roe deer, squirrels, hares, wild boars, Manchurian deer, musk deer, lynxes, sables, marmots, and tarbagans live here.

The world of predators is represented by bears, foxes and wolves. Of the birds, cranes, kites, eagles, capercaillie, hazel grouse, partridges, etc. live here.

=== External links ===
- "Выдающиеся жители села Бортой" по материалам Цыденовой А.В., библиотекаря СП "Бортойское"
