= Khonkholoy, Mukhorshibirsky District, Republic of Buryatia =

Khonkholoy Хонхолой
- Selo
- Location within Republic of Buryatia Location within Russia
- Coordinates: 51°07′N 108°13′E
- Country: Russia
- Region: Republic of Buryatia
- District: Mukhorshibirsky District
- Time zone: UTC+8:00

Khonkholoy (Russian: Хонхолой) is a rural locality (a selo) in Mukhorshibirsky District, Republic of Buryatia, Russia. The population was 1,590 as of 2010. There are 18 streets.

== Geography ==
Khonkholoy is located 29 km northeast of Mukhorshibir (the district's administrative centre) by road. Nikolsk is the nearest rural locality.
