= Zhilino, Republic of Buryatia =

Zhilino Жилино
- Selo
- Location within Republic of Buryatia Location within Russia
- Coordinates: 52°08′N 106°36′E
- Country: Russia
- Region: Republic of Buryatia
- District: Kabansky District
- Time zone: UTC+8:00

Zhilino (Russian: Жи́лино) is a rural locality (a selo) in Kabansky District, Republic of Buryatia, Russia. The population was 171 as of 2010. There are 15 streets.

== Geography ==
Zhilino is located 45 km north of Kabansk (the district's administrative centre) by road. Novaya Derevnya is the nearest rural locality.
