= Ulan-Ivolginsky =

Ulan-Ivolginsky Улан-Иволгинский
- Ulus
- Location within Republic of Buryatia Location within Russia
- Coordinates: 51°46′N 107°22′E
- Country: Russia
- Region: Republic of Buryatia
- District: Ivolginsky District
- Time zone: UTC+8:00

Ulan-Ivolginsky (Russian: Улан-Иволгинский; Buryat: Улаан Ивалгын, Ulaan Ivalgyn) is a rural locality (an ulus) in Ivolginsky District, Republic of Buryatia, Russia. The population was 90 as of 2010. There are 2 streets.

== Geography ==
Ulan-Ivolginsky is located 9 km northeast of Ivolginsk (the district's administrative centre) by road. Nizhnyaya Ivolga is the nearest rural locality.
