= Kulkison =

Kulkison Кулькисон
- Selo
- Location within Republic of Buryatia Location within Russia
- Coordinates: 52°02′N 111°00′E
- Country: Russia
- Region: Republic of Buryatia
- District: Kizhinginsky District
- Time zone: UTC+8:00

Kulkison (Russian: Кулькисон; Buryat: Хүльхисөөн, Khülkhisöön) is a rural locality (a selo) in Kizhinginsky District, Republic of Buryatia, Russia. The population was 82 as of 2010. There is 1 street.
