= Unegetey =

Unegetey Унэгэтэй
- Selo
- Location within Republic of Buryatia Location within Russia
- Coordinates: 52°06′N 108°33′E
- Country: Russia
- Region: Republic of Buryatia
- District: Zaigrayevsky District
- Time zone: UTC+8:00

Unegetey (Russian: Унэгэтэй; Buryat: Υнэгэтэй, Ünegetei) is a rural locality (a selo) in Zaigrayevsky District, Republic of Buryatia, Russia. The population was 1,896 as of 2010. There are 26 streets.

== Geography ==
Unegetey is located 45 km northeast of Zaigrayevo (the district's administrative centre) by road. Novaya Kurba is the nearest rural locality.
