= Verkhny Sutay =

Verkhny Sutay Верхний Сутай
- Selo
- Location within Republic of Buryatia Location within Russia
- Coordinates: 51°18′N 107°54′E
- Country: Russia
- Region: Republic of Buryatia
- District: Mukhorshibirsky District
- Time zone: UTC+8:00

Verkhny Sutay (Russian: Верхний Сутай; Buryat: Дээдэ Һутай, Deede Hutai) is a rural locality (a selo) in Mukhorshibirsky District, Republic of Buryatia, Russia. The population was 70 as of 2010. There are 2 streets.

== Geography ==
Verkhny Sutay is located 63 km north of Mukhorshibir (the district's administrative centre) by road. Narsata is the nearest rural locality.
