= Zhemchug, Republic of Buryatia =

Zhemchug Жемчуг
- Selo
- Location within Republic of Buryatia Location within Russia
- Coordinates: 51°41′N 102°27′E
- Country: Russia
- Region: Republic of Buryatia
- District: Tunkinsky District
- Time zone: UTC+8:00

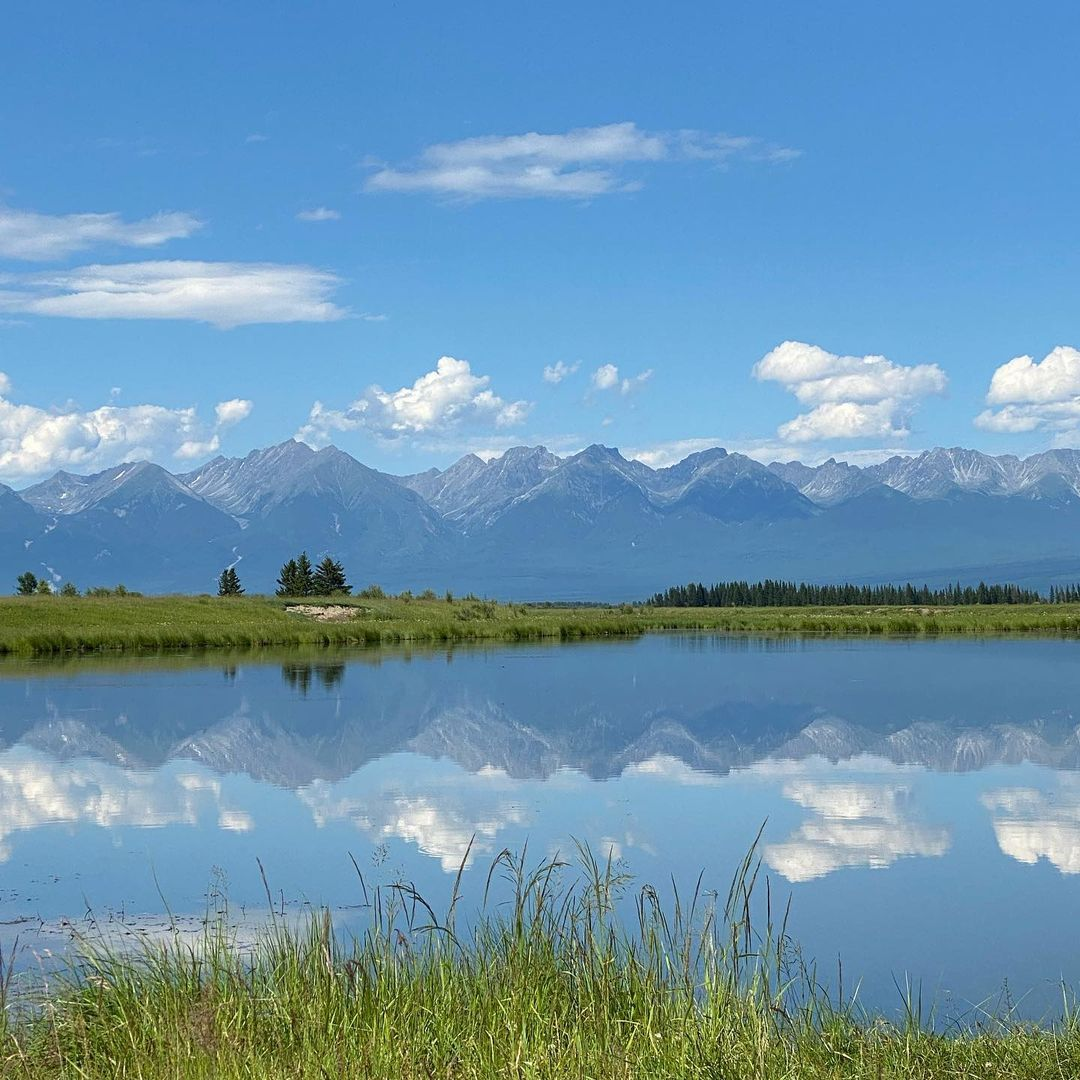
Lake near the village of Zhemchug

Zhemchug (Russian: Жемчуг; Buryat: Жэмһэг, Jemheg) is a rural locality (a selo) in Tunkinsky District, Republic of Buryatia, Russia. The population was 1,138 as of 2010. There are 16 streets.

== Geography ==
Zhemchug is located 24 km east of Kyren (the district's administrative centre) by road. Okhor-Shibir is the nearest rural locality.
