= Novy Zagan =

Novy Zagan Новый Заган
- Selo
- Location within Republic of Buryatia Location within Russia
- Coordinates: 51°01′N 107°46′E
- Country: Russia
- Region: Republic of Buryatia
- District: Mukhorshibirsky District
- Time zone: UTC+8:00

Novy Zagan (Russian: Новый Заган) is a rural locality (a selo) in Mukhorshibirsky District, Republic of Buryatia, Russia. The population was 1,553 as of 2010. There are 20 streets.

== Geography ==
Novy Zagan is located 4 km southwest of Mukhorshibir (the district's administrative centre) by road. Stary Zagan is the nearest rural locality.
