= Nadeyino =

Nadeyino Надеино
- Selo
- Location within Republic of Buryatia Location within Russia
- Coordinates: 51°32′N 107°39′E
- Country: Russia
- Region: Republic of Buryatia
- District: Tarbagataysky District
- Time zone: UTC+8:00

Nadeyino (Russian: Надеино) is a rural locality (a selo) in Tarbagataysky District, Republic of Buryatia, Russia. The population was 360 as of 2010. There are 3 streets.

== Geography ==
Nadeyino is located 25 km northeast of Tarbagatay (the district's administrative centre) by road. Kuytun is the nearest rural locality.
