= Sukhaya, Barguzinsky District, Republic of Buryatia =

Sukhaya Сухая
- Selo
- Location within Republic of Buryatia Location within Russia
- Coordinates: 53°44′N 109°48′E
- Country: Russia
- Region: Republic of Buryatia
- District: Barguzinsky District
- Time zone: UTC+8:00

Sukhaya (Russian: Сухая) is a rural locality (a selo) in Barguzinsky District, Republic of Buryatia, Russia. The population was 12 as of 2010. There are 14 streets.

== Geography ==
Sukhaya is located 21 km northeast of Barguzin (the district's administrative centre) by road. Ulyun is the nearest rural locality.
