= Tukhum =

Tukhum Тухум
- Ulus
- Location within Republic of Buryatia Location within Russia
- Coordinates: 50°57′N 106°57′E
- Country: Russia
- Region: Republic of Buryatia
- District: Selenginsky District
- Time zone: UTC+8:00

Tukhum (Russian: Тухум; Buryat: Тγхэм, Tükhem) is a rural locality (an ulus) in Selenginsky District, Republic of Buryatia, Russia. The population was 20 as of 2010. There are 2 streets.
