= Baturino, Republic of Buryatia =

Baturino Батурино
- Selo
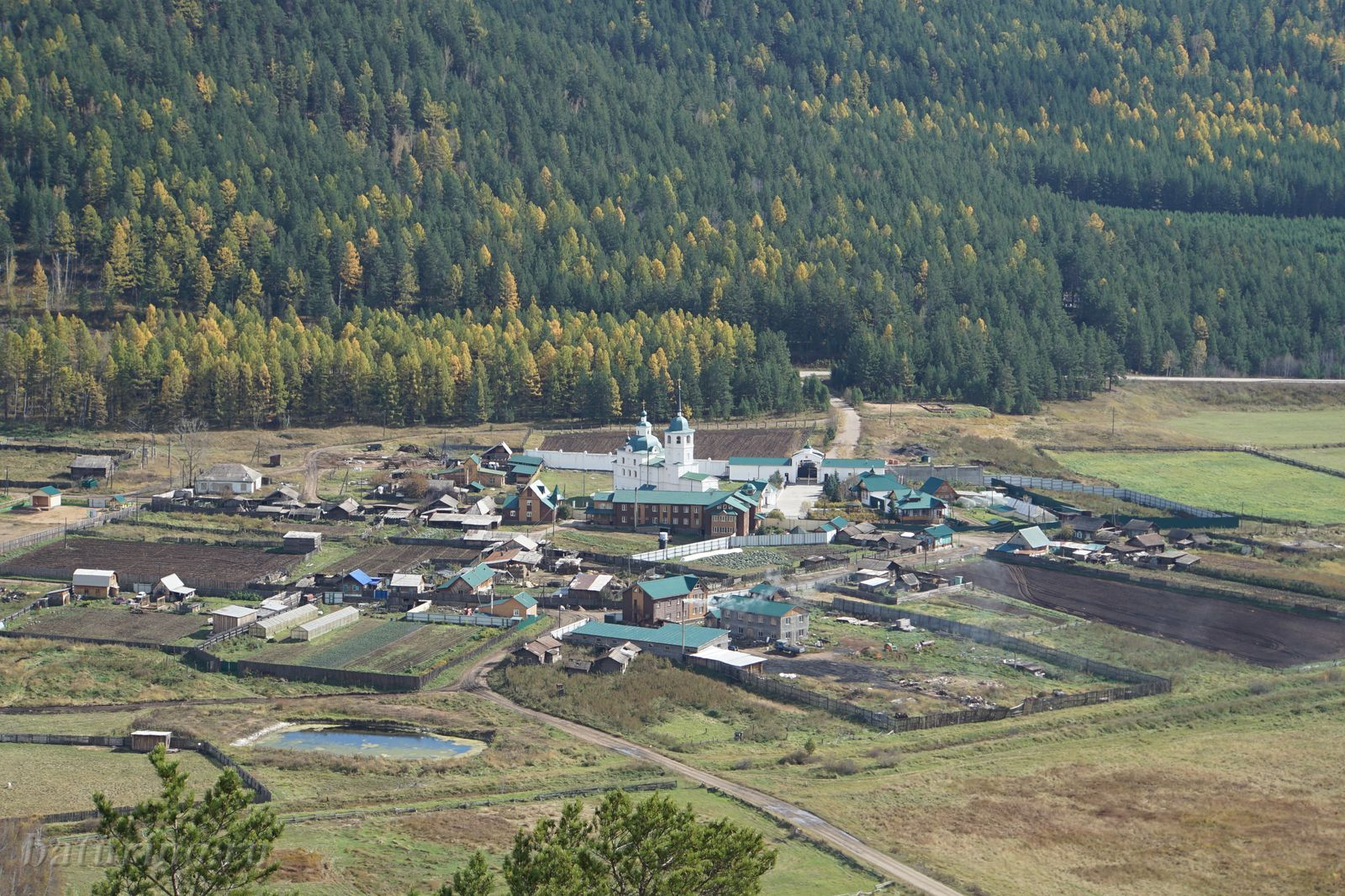

- Location within Republic of Buryatia Location within Russia
- Coordinates: 52°20′N 107°51′E
- Country: Russia
- Region: Republic of Buryatia
- District: Pribaykalsky District
- Time zone: UTC+8:00

Baturino (Russian: Батурино) is a rural locality (a selo) in Pribaykalsky District, Republic of Buryatia, Russia. The population was 45 as of 2010. There are four streets.

== Geography ==
Baturino is located 25 km northeast of Turuntayevo (the district's administrative centre) by road. Nesterovo is the nearest rural locality.
