= Chernoyarovo =

Chernoyarovo Черноярово
- Selo
- Location within Republic of Buryatia Location within Russia
- Coordinates: 50°54′N 107°03′E
- Country: Russia
- Region: Republic of Buryatia
- District: Mukhorshibirsky District
- Time zone: UTC+8:00

Chernoyarovo (Russian: Черноярово) is a rural locality (a selo) in Mukhorshibirsky District, Republic of Buryatia, Russia. The population was 7 as of 2010. There is 1 street.

== Geography ==
Chernoyarovo is located 80 km southwest of Mukhorshibir (the district's administrative centre) by road. Podlopatki is the nearest rural locality.
