= Cheryomushka =

Cheryomushka Черёмушка
- Settlement
- Location within Republic of Buryatia Location within Russia
- Coordinates: 52°45′N 108°05′E
- Country: Russia
- Region: Republic of Buryatia
- District: Pribaykalsky District
- Time zone: UTC+8:00

Cheryomushka (Russian: Черёмушка) is a rural locality (a settlement) in Pribaykalsky District, Republic of Buryatia, Russia. The population was 68 as of 2010. There is 1 street.

== Geography ==
Cheryomushka is located 79 km north of Turuntayevo (the district's administrative centre) by road. Kotokel is the nearest rural locality.
