= Mogoy-Gorkhon =

Mogoy-Gorkhon Могой-Горхон
- Ulus
- Location within Republic of Buryatia Location within Russia
- Coordinates: 51°40′N 102°04′E
- Country: Russia
- Region: Republic of Buryatia
- District: Tunkinsky District
- Time zone: UTC+8:00

Mogoy-Gorkhon (Russian: Могой-Горхон) is a rural locality (an ulus) in Tunkinsky District, Republic of Buryatia, Russia. The population was 88 as of 2010. There are 2 streets.

== Geography ==
Mogoy-Gorkhon is located 4 km west of Kyren (the district's administrative centre) by road. Khuzhiry is the nearest rural locality.
