= Sharza =

Sharza Шарза
- Ulus
- Location within Republic of Buryatia Location within Russia
- Coordinates: 52°43′N 99°31′E
- Country: Russia
- Region: Republic of Buryatia
- District: Okinsky District
- Time zone: UTC+8:00

Sharza (Russian: Шарза) is a rural locality (an ulus) in Okinsky District, Republic of Buryatia, Russia. The population was 33 as of 2010.

== Geography ==
Sharza is located 41 km northwest of Orlik (the district's administrative centre) by road. Borik is the nearest rural locality.
