= Khuray-Khobok =

Khuray-Khobok Хурай-Хобок
- Selo
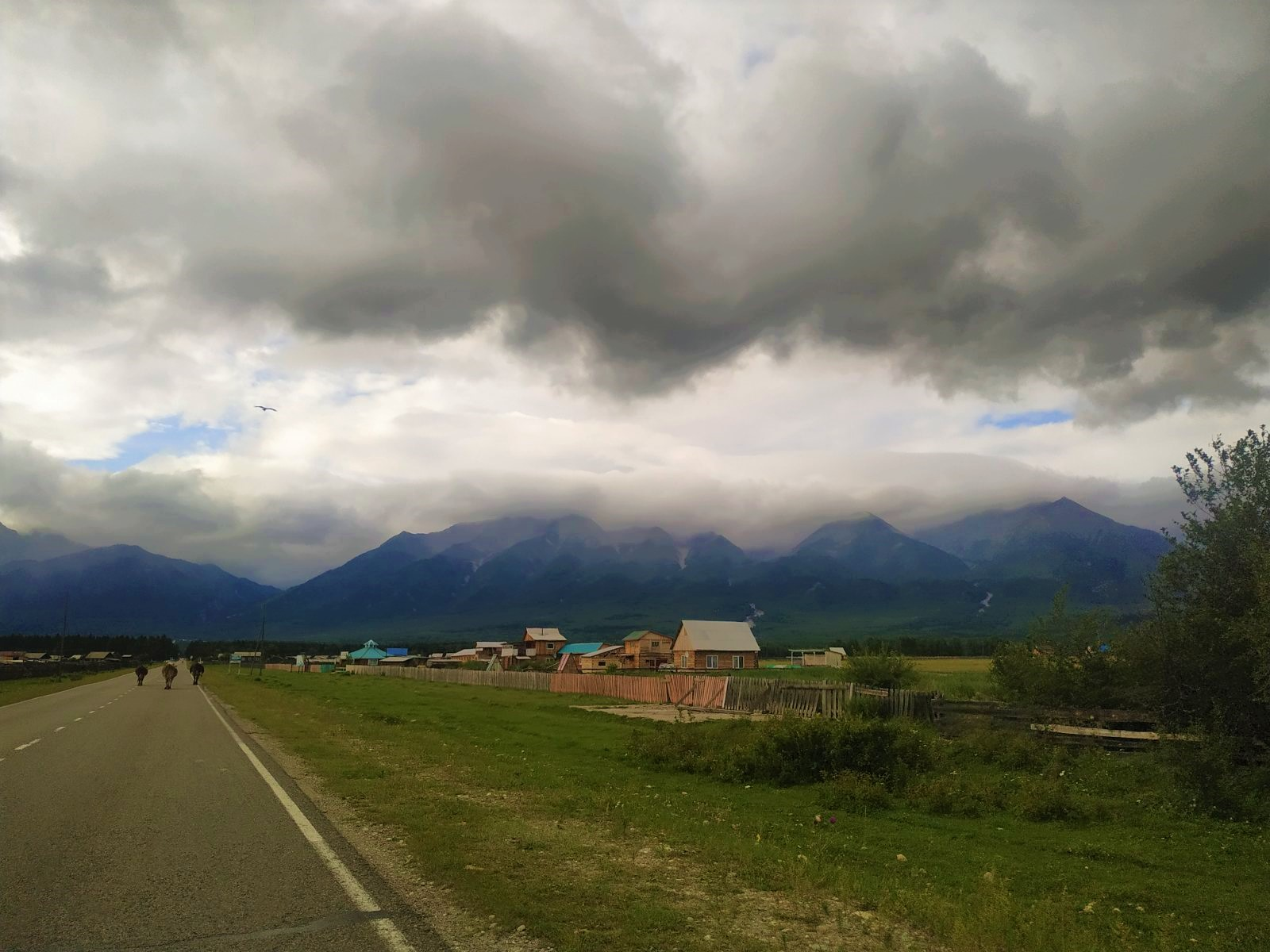

- Location within Republic of Buryatia Location within Russia
- Coordinates: 51°51′N 102°28′E
- Country: Russia
- Region: Republic of Buryatia
- District: Tunkinsky District
- Time zone: UTC+8:00

Khuray-Khobok (Russian: Хурай-Хобок; Buryat: Хуурай Хобог, Khuurai Khobog) is a rural locality (a selo) in Tunkinsky District, Republic of Buryatia, Russia. The population was 630 as of 2010. There are 6 streets.

== Geography ==
Khuray-Khobok is located 53 km northeast of Kyren (the district's administrative centre) by road. Taloye is the nearest rural locality.
