= Zurgan-Debe =

Zurgan-Debe Зурган-Дэбэ
- Ulus
- Location within Republic of Buryatia Location within Russia
- Coordinates: 51°04′N 107°01′E
- Country: Russia
- Region: Republic of Buryatia
- District: Selenginsky District
- Time zone: UTC+8:00

Zurgan-Debe (Russian: Зурган-Дэбэ; Buryat: Зургаан Дэбэ, Zurgaan Debe) is a rural locality (an ulus) in Selenginsky District, Republic of Buryatia, Russia. The population was 878 as of 2010. There are 39 streets.

== Geography ==
Zurgan-Debe is located 64 km southeast of Gusinoozyorsk (the district's administrative centre) by road.
