= Ungurkuy =

Ungurkuy Унгуркуй
- Selo
- Location within Republic of Buryatia Location within Russia
- Coordinates: 50°18′N 107°09′E
- Country: Russia
- Region: Republic of Buryatia
- District: Kyakhtinsky District
- Time zone: UTC+8:00

Ungurkuy (Russian: Унгуркуй) is a rural locality (a selo) in Kyakhtinsky District, Republic of Buryatia, Russia. The population was 444 as of 2010. There are 7 streets.

== Geography ==
Ungurkuy is located 69 km southeast of Kyakhta (the district's administrative centre) by road. Ubur-Kiret is the nearest rural locality.
