= Baraty =

Baraty Бараты
- Settlement
- Location within Republic of Buryatia Location within Russia
- Coordinates: 51°14′N 106°22′E
- Country: Russia
- Region: Republic of Buryatia
- District: Selenginsky District
- Time zone: UTC+8:00

Baraty (Russian: Бараты; Buryat: Бороотой, Borootoi) is a rural locality (a settlement) in Selenginsky District, Republic of Buryatia, Russia. The population was 589 as of 2010. There are 14 streets.

== Geography ==
Baraty is located 20 km southwest of Gusinoozyorsk (the district's administrative centre) by road. Zagustay is the nearest rural locality.
