= Tsagan-Usun =

Tsagan-Usun Цаган-Усун
- Selo
- Location within Republic of Buryatia Location within Russia
- Coordinates: 50°26′N 106°01′E
- Country: Russia
- Region: Republic of Buryatia
- District: Dzhidinsky District
- Time zone: UTC+8:00

Tsagan-Usun (Russian: Цаган-Усун; Buryat: Сагаан уһан, Sagaan uhan) is a rural locality (a selo) in Dzhidinsky District, Republic of Buryatia, Russia. The population was 276 as of 2010. There are 6 streets.

== Geography ==
Tsagan-Usun is located 74 km southeast of Petropavlovka (the district's administrative centre) by road. Naushki is the nearest rural locality.
