= Tarbagatayka =

Tarbagatayka Тарбагатайка
- Selo
- Location within Republic of Buryatia Location within Russia
- Coordinates: 51°36′N 108°24′E
- Country: Russia
- Region: Republic of Buryatia
- District: Zaigrayevsky District
- Time zone: UTC+8:00

Tarbagatayka (Russian: Тарбагатайка) is a rural locality (a selo) in Zaigrayevsky District, Republic of Buryatia, Russia. The population was 33 as of 2010. There is 1 street.

== Geography ==
Tarbagatayka is located 35 km south of Zaigrayevo (the district's administrative centre) by road. Karyernaya is the nearest rural locality.
