= Barun-Khasurta =

Barun-Khasurta Барун-Хасурта
- Ulus
- Location within Republic of Buryatia Location within Russia
- Coordinates: 52°08′N 109°01′E
- Country: Russia
- Region: Republic of Buryatia
- District: Khorinsky District
- Time zone: UTC+8:00

Barun-Khasurta (Russian: Барун-Хасурта; Buryat: Баруун Хасуурта, Baruun Khasuurta) is a rural locality (an ulus) in Khorinsky District, Republic of Buryatia, Russia. The population was 237 as of 2010. There are 7 streets.

== Geography ==
Barun-Khasurta is located 56 km west of Khorinsk (the district's administrative centre) by road. Udinsk is the nearest rural locality.
