= Balakta =

Balakta Балакта
- Ulus
- Location within Republic of Buryatia Location within Russia
- Coordinates: 52°29′N 99°41′E
- Country: Russia
- Region: Republic of Buryatia
- District: Okinsky District
- Time zone: UTC+8:00

Balakta (Russian: Балакта; Buryat: Балагта, Balagta) is a rural locality (an ulus) in Okinsky District, Republic of Buryatia, Russia. The population was 241 as of 2010. There are 3 streets.

== Geography ==
Balakta is located 14 km southwest of Orlik (the district's administrative centre) by road. Orlik is the nearest rural locality.
