= Ulzar =

Ulzar Улзар
- Selo
- Location within Republic of Buryatia Location within Russia
- Coordinates: 50°45′N 104°49′E
- Country: Russia
- Region: Republic of Buryatia
- District: Dzhidinsky District
- Time zone: UTC+8:00

Ulzar (Russian: Улзар; Buryat: Уулзар, Uulzar) is a rural locality (a selo) in Dzhidinsky District, Republic of Buryatia, Russia. The population was 110 as of 2010. There are 20 streets.
