= Stary Ukyrchelon =

Stary Ukyrchelon Старый Укырчелон
- Selo
- Location within Republic of Buryatia Location within Russia
- Coordinates: 50°30′N 104°58′E
- Country: Russia
- Region: Republic of Buryatia
- District: Dzhidinsky District
- Time zone: UTC+8:00

Stary Ukyrchelon (Russian: Старый Укырчелон; Buryat: Үхэр шулуун, Ükher shuluun) is a rural locality (a selo) in Dzhidinsky District, Republic of Buryatia, Russia. The population was 49 as of 2010. There is 1 street.

== Geography ==
Stary Ukyrchelon is located 30 km southwest of Petropavlovka (the district's administrative centre) by road. Tokhoy is the nearest rural locality.
