= Tolbazikha =

Tolbazikha Толбазиха
- Settlement
- Location within Republic of Buryatia Location within Russia
- Coordinates: 51°26′N 104°41′E
- Country: Russia
- Region: Republic of Buryatia
- District: Kabansky District
- Time zone: UTC+8:00

Tolbazikha (Russian: Толбазиха) is a rural locality (a settlement) in Kabansky District, Republic of Buryatia, Russia. The population was 28 as of 2010. There is 1 street.

== Geography ==
Tolbazikha is located 163 km southwest of Kabansk (the district's administrative centre) by road. Vydrino is the nearest rural locality.
