= Ulan-Gorkhon =

Ulan-Gorkhon Улан-Горхон
- Ulus
- Location within Republic of Buryatia Location within Russia
- Coordinates: 51°40′N 102°31′E
- Country: Russia
- Region: Republic of Buryatia
- District: Tunkinsky District
- Time zone: UTC+8:00

Ulan-Gorkhon (Russian: Улан-Горхон; Buryat: Улаан Горхон, Ulaan Gorkhon) is a rural locality (an ulus) in Tunkinsky District, Republic of Buryatia, Russia. The population was 36 as of 2010. There is 1 street.

== Geography ==
Ulan-Gorkhon is located 29 km east of Kyren (the district's administrative centre) by road. Zhemchug is the nearest rural locality.
