= Yelovka =

Yelovka Еловка
- Settlement
- Location within Republic of Buryatia Location within Russia
- Coordinates: 52°03′47″N 107°28′37″E
- Country: Russia
- Region: Republic of Buryatia
- District: Pribaykalsky District
- Time zone: UTC+8:00

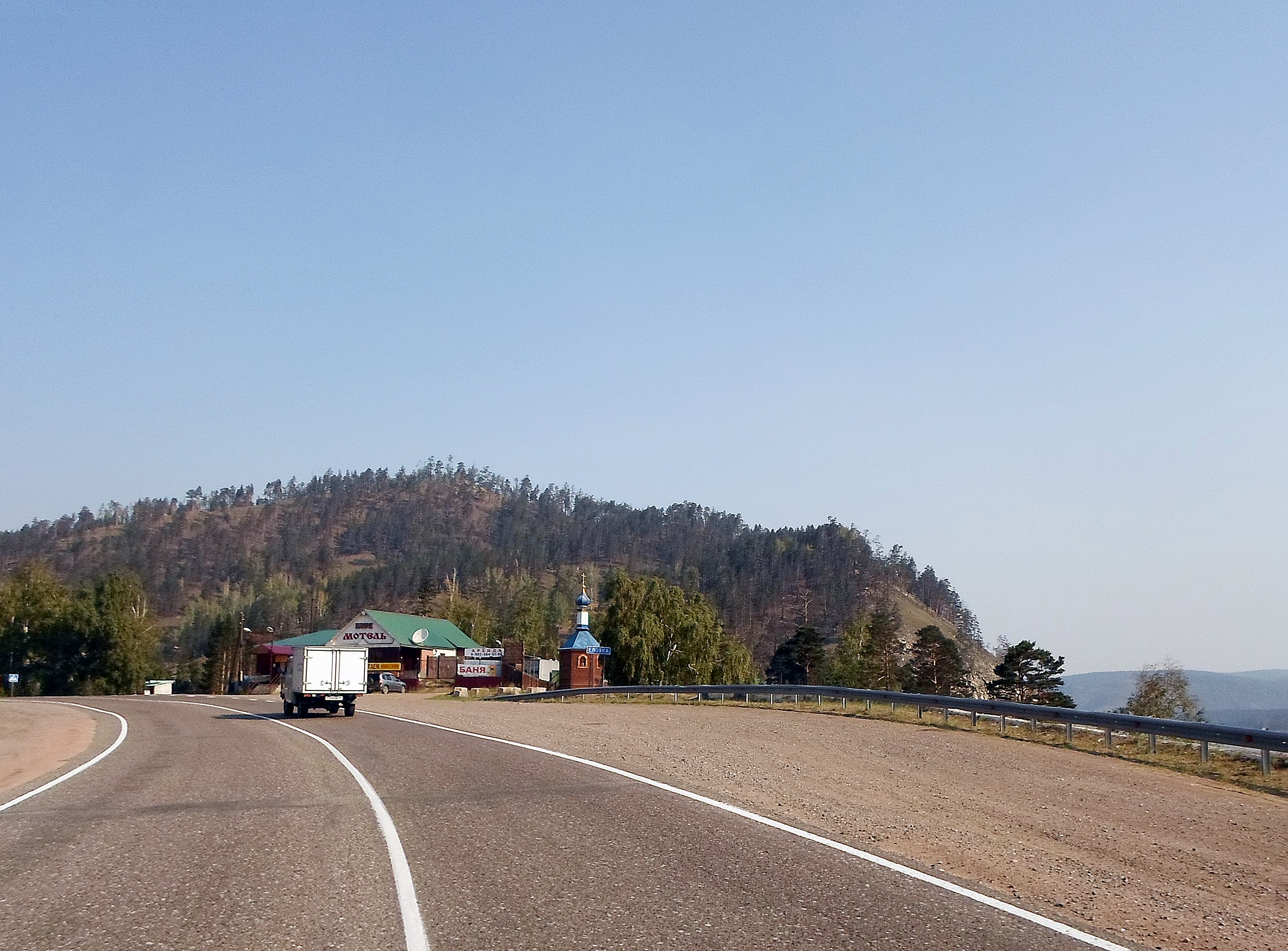

Yelovka (Russian: Еловка) is a rural locality (a settlement) in Pribaykalsky District, Republic of Buryatia, Russia. The population was 320 as of 2010. There are 16 streets.

== Geography ==
Yelovka is located 34 km southwest of Turuntayevo (the district's administrative centre) by road. Staroye Tataurovo is the nearest rural locality.
