= Deben, Bichursky District, Republic of Buryatia =

Deben Дэбэн
- Selo
- Location within Republic of Buryatia Location within Russia
- Coordinates: 50°33′56″N 106°56′23″E
- Country: Russia
- Region: Republic of Buryatia
- District: Bichursky District
- Time zone: UTC+8:00

Deben (Russian: Дэбэн; Buryat: Дэбээн, Debeen) is a rural locality (a selo) in Bichursky District, Republic of Buryatia, Russia. The population was 54 as of 2010. There is 1 street.

== Geography ==
Deben is located 52 km west of Bichura (the district's administrative centre) by road. Podgornoye is the nearest rural locality.
