= Ulzyte, Kizhinginsky District, Republic of Buryatia =

Ulzyte Улзытэ
- Selo
- Location within Republic of Buryatia Location within Russia
- Coordinates: 51°55′N 110°07′E
- Country: Russia
- Region: Republic of Buryatia
- District: Kizhinginsky District
- Time zone: UTC+8:00

Ulzyte (Russian: Улзытэ; Buryat: Υлзытэ, Ülzyte) is a rural locality (a selo) in Kizhinginsky District, Republic of Buryatia, Russia. The population was 316 as of 2010. There are 4 streets.

== Geography ==
Ulzyte is located 24 km northeast of Kizhinga (the district's administrative centre) by road. Innokentyevka is the nearest rural locality.
