= Taloye =

Taloye Талое
- Selo
- Location within Republic of Buryatia Location within Russia
- Coordinates: 51°49′N 102°28′E
- Country: Russia
- Region: Republic of Buryatia
- District: Tunkinsky District
- Time zone: UTC+8:00

Taloye (Russian: Талое) is a rural locality (a selo) in Tunkinsky District, Republic of Buryatia, Russia. The population was 183 as of 2010. There are 3 streets.

== Geography ==
Taloye is located 51 km northeast of Kyren (the district's administrative centre) by road. Khuray-Khobok is the nearest rural locality.
