= Ina, Republic of Buryatia =

Ina Ина
- Settlement
- Location within Republic of Buryatia Location within Russia
- Coordinates: 53°44′N 110°13′E
- Country: Russia
- Region: Republic of Buryatia
- District: Barguzinsky District
- Time zone: UTC+8:00

Ina (Russian: Ина; Buryat: Онёо) is a rural locality (a settlement) in Barguzinsky District, Republic of Buryatia, Russia. The population was 282 as of 2010. There are 6 streets.

== Geography ==
Ina is located 61 km northeast of Barguzin (the district's administrative centre) by road. Yubileyny is the nearest rural locality.
