= Bugunda =

Bugunda Бугунда
- Settlement
- Location within Republic of Buryatia Location within Russia
- Coordinates: 53°45′N 114°13′E
- Country: Russia
- Region: Republic of Buryatia
- District: Bauntovsky District
- Time zone: UTC+8:00

Bugunda (Russian: Бугунда) is a rural locality (a settlement) in Bauntovsky District, Republic of Buryatia, Russia. The population was 20 as of 2010. There is 1 street.

== Geography ==
Bugunda is located 85 km southeast of Bagdarin (the district's administrative centre) by road.
