= Sredny Kharlun =

Sredny Kharlun Средний Харлун
- Ulus
- Location within Republic of Buryatia Location within Russia
- Coordinates: 50°38′N 106°55′E
- Country: Russia
- Region: Republic of Buryatia
- District: Bichursky District
- Time zone: UTC+8:00

Sredny Kharlun (Russian: Средний Харлун, Buryat: Дунда Харлан, Dunda Kharlan) is a rural locality (an ulus) in Bichursky District, Republic of Buryatia, Russia. The population was 395 as of 2010. There are 5 streets.

== Geography ==
Sredny Kharlun is located 56 km west of Bichura (the district's administrative centre) by road. Bolshoy Lug is the nearest rural locality.
