= Utata =

Utata Утата
- Ulus
- Location within Republic of Buryatia Location within Russia
- Coordinates: 50°49′N 102°47′E
- Country: Russia
- Region: Republic of Buryatia
- District: Zakamensky District
- Time zone: UTC+8:00

Utata (Russian: Утата; Buryat: Утаата, Utaata) is a rural locality (an ulus) in Zakamensky District, Republic of Buryatia, Russia. The population was 653 as of 2010. There are 10 streets.

== Geography ==
Utata is located 90 km northwest of Zakamensk (the district's administrative centre) by road. Sanaga is the nearest rural locality.
