= Zakaltus =

Zakaltus Закалтус
- Selo
- Location within Republic of Buryatia Location within Russia
- Coordinates: 52°01′N 106°35′E
- Country: Russia
- Region: Republic of Buryatia
- District: Kabansky District
- Time zone: UTC+8:00

Zakaltus (Russian: Закалтус) is a rural locality (a selo) in Kabansky District, Republic of Buryatia, Russia. The population was 495 as of 2010. There are 7 streets.

== Geography ==
Zakaltus is located 6 km southwest of Kabansk (the district's administrative centre) by road. Timlyuy is the nearest rural locality.
