= Klochnevo =

Klochnevo Клочнево
- Selo
- Location within Republic of Buryatia Location within Russia
- Coordinates: 52°10′N 107°33′E
- Country: Russia
- Region: Republic of Buryatia
- District: Pribaykalsky District
- Time zone: UTC+8:00

Klochnevo (Russian: Клочнево) is a rural locality (a selo) in Pribaykalsky District, Republic of Buryatia, Russia. The population was 12 as of 2010.
