= Selenga, Republic of Buryatia =

Selenga Селенга
- Selo
- Location within Republic of Buryatia Location within Russia
- Coordinates: 51°37′N 107°24′E
- Country: Russia
- Region: Republic of Buryatia
- District: Tarbagataysky District
- Time zone: UTC+8:00

Selenga (Russian: Селенга; Buryat: Сэлэнгэ, Selenge) is a rural locality (a selo) in Tarbagataysky District, Republic of Buryatia, Russia. The population was 99 as of 2010. There are 4 streets.

== Geography ==
Selenga is located 19 km north of Tarbagatay (the district's administrative centre) by road. Solontsy is the nearest rural locality.
