= Barykino =

Barykino Барыкино
- Selo
- Location within Republic of Buryatia Location within Russia
- Coordinates: 51°14′N 107°11′E
- Country: Russia
- Region: Republic of Buryatia
- District: Tarbagataysky District
- Time zone: UTC+8:00

Barykino (Russian: Барыкино) is a rural locality (a selo) in Tarbagataysky District, Republic of Buryatia, Russia. The population was 368 as of 2010. There are 5 streets.

== Geography ==
Barykino is located 36 km southwest of Tarbagatay (the district's administrative centre) by road. Barykino-Klyuchi is the nearest rural locality.
