= Angoya =

Angoya Ангоя
- Settlement
- Location within Republic of Buryatia Location within Russia
- Coordinates: 56°00′N 110°54′E
- Country: Russia
- Region: Republic of Buryatia
- District: Severo-Baykalsky District
- Time zone: UTC+8:00

Angoya (Russian: Ангоя) is a rural locality (a settlement) in Severo-Baykalsky District, Republic of Buryatia, Russia. The population was 665 as of 2010. There are 14 streets.

== Geography ==
Angoya is located 97 km northeast of Nizhneangarsk (the district's administrative centre) by road. Uoyan is the nearest rural locality.
