= Kizha =

Kizha Кижа
- Station
- Location within Republic of Buryatia Location within Russia
- Coordinates: 51°27′N 108°52′E
- Country: Russia
- Region: Republic of Buryatia
- District: Zaigrayevsky District
- Time zone: UTC+8:00

Kizha (Russian: Кижа; Buryat: Хэжэ, Kheje) is a rural locality (a station) in Zaigrayevsky District, Republic of Buryatia, Russia. The population was 84 as of 2010. There are 4 streets.
