= Angir =

Angir Ангир
- Ulus
- Location within Republic of Buryatia Location within Russia
- Coordinates: 52°13′N 108°35′E
- Country: Russia
- Region: Republic of Buryatia
- District: Zaigrayevsky District
- Time zone: UTC+8:00

Angir (Russian: Ангир) is a rural locality (an ulus) in Zaigrayevsky District, Republic of Buryatia, Russia. The population was 158 as of 2010. There is 1 street.

== Geography ==
Angir is located 61 km north of Zaigrayevo (the district's administrative centre) by road. Krasny Yar is the nearest rural locality.
