= Uya, Republic of Buryatia =

Uya Уя
- Settlement
- Location within Republic of Buryatia Location within Russia
- Coordinates: 55°35′N 114°30′E
- Country: Russia
- Region: Republic of Buryatia
- District: Bauntovsky District
- Time zone: UTC+8:00

Uya (Russian: Уя) is a rural locality (a settlement) in Bauntovsky District, Republic of Buryatia, Russia. The population was 3 as of 2010. There is 1 street.
