= Podlopatki =

Podlopatki Подлопатки
- Selo
- Location within Republic of Buryatia Location within Russia
- Coordinates: 50°55′N 107°05′E
- Country: Russia
- Region: Republic of Buryatia
- District: Mukhorshibirsky District
- Time zone: UTC+8:00

Podlopatki (Russian: Подлопатки) is a rural locality (a selo) in Mukhorshibirsky District, Republic of Buryatia, Russia. The population was 1,006 as of 2010. There are 11 streets.

== Geography ==
Podlopatki is located 74 km west of Mukhorshibir (the district's administrative centre) by road. Bilyutay and Ust-Altasha are the nearest rural localities.
