= Dabata =

Dabata Дабата
- Ulus
- Location within Republic of Buryatia Location within Russia
- Coordinates: 51°54′N 107°50′E
- Country: Russia
- Region: Republic of Buryatia
- District: Zaigrayevsky District
- Time zone: UTC+8:00

Dabata (Russian: Дабата; Buryat: Дабаата, Dabaata) is a rural locality (an ulus) in Zaigrayevsky District, Republic of Buryatia, Russia. The population was 100 as of 2010. There are 18 streets.

== Geography ==
Dabata is located 40 km northwest of Zaigrayevo (the district's administrative centre) by road. Erkhirik is the nearest rural locality.
