= Ust-Egita =

Ust-Egita Усть-Эгита
- Selo
- Location within Republic of Buryatia Location within Russia
- Coordinates: 52°19′N 110°36′E
- Country: Russia
- Region: Republic of Buryatia
- District: Yeravninsky District
- Time zone: UTC+8:00

Ust-Egita (Russian: Усть-Эгита; Buryat: Эгэтын Адаг, Egetyn Adag) is a rural locality (a selo) in Yeravninsky District, Republic of Buryatia, Russia. The population was 1,058 as of 2010. There are 68 streets.

== Geography ==
Ust-Egita is located 70 km southwest of Sosnovo-Ozerskoye (the district's administrative centre) by road. Tuzhinka is the nearest rural locality.
