= Sudutuy =

Sudutuy Судутуй
- Ulus
- Location within Republic of Buryatia Location within Russia
- Coordinates: 50°40′N 107°25′E
- Country: Russia
- Region: Republic of Buryatia
- District: Bichursky District
- Time zone: UTC+8:00

Sudutuy (Russian: Судутуй) is a rural locality (an ulus) in Bichursky District, Republic of Buryatia, Russia. The population was 38 as of 2010. There is 1 street.

== Geography ==
Sudutuy is located 24 km northwest of Bichura (the district's administrative centre) by road. Petropavlovka is the nearest rural locality.
