= Tasarkhay =

Tasarkhay Тасархай
- Selo
- Location within Republic of Buryatia Location within Russia
- Coordinates: 50°31′N 105°33′E
- Country: Russia
- Region: Republic of Buryatia
- District: Dzhidinsky District
- Time zone: UTC+8:00

Tasarkhay (Russian: Тасархай; Buryat: Таһархай, Taharkhai) is a rural locality (a selo) in Dzhidinsky District, Republic of Buryatia, Russia. The population was 136 as of 2010. There are 15 streets.

== Geography ==
Tasarkhay is located 24 km southeast of Petropavlovka (the district's administrative centre) by road. Dodo-Ichyotuy is the nearest rural locality.
