= Voznesenovka, Republic of Buryatia =

Voznesenovka Вознесеновка
- Selo
- Location within Republic of Buryatia Location within Russia
- Coordinates: 51°42′N 107°28′E
- Country: Russia
- Region: Republic of Buryatia
- District: Tarbagataysky District
- Time zone: UTC+8:00

Voznesenovka (Russian: Вознесеновка) is a rural locality (a selo) in Tarbagataysky District, Republic of Buryatia, Russia. The population was 413 as of 2010. There are 15 streets.

== Geography ==
Voznesenovka is located 30 km north of Tarbagatay (the district's administrative centre) by road. Nizhny Sayantuy is the nearest rural locality.
