= Mozhayka =

Mozhayka Можайка
- Settlement
- Location within Republic of Buryatia Location within Russia
- Coordinates: 52°24′N 110°47′E
- Country: Russia
- Region: Republic of Buryatia
- District: Yeravninsky District
- Time zone: UTC+8:00

Mozhayka (Russian: Можайка; Buryat: Мужыха, Mujykha) is a rural locality (a settlement) in Yeravninsky District, Republic of Buryatia, Russia. The population was 1,117 as of 2010. There are 43 streets.

== Geography ==
Mozhayka is located 55 km southwest of Sosnovo-Ozerskoye (the district's administrative centre) by road. Egita is the nearest rural locality.
