= Shapenkovo =

Shapenkovo Шапеньково
- Selo
- Location within Republic of Buryatia Location within Russia
- Coordinates: 53°33′N 109°38′E
- Country: Russia
- Region: Republic of Buryatia
- District: Barguzinsky District
- Time zone: UTC+8:00

Shapenkovo (Russian: Шапеньково) is a rural locality (a selo) in Barguzinsky District, Republic of Buryatia, Russia. The population was 199 as of 2010. There is 1 street.

== Geography ==
Shapenkovo is located 10 km south of Barguzin (the district's administrative centre) by road. Barguzin is the nearest rural locality.
