= Maximikha =

Maximikha Максимиха
- Selo
- Location within Republic of Buryatia Location within Russia
- Coordinates: 53°15′N 108°43′E
- Country: Russia
- Region: Republic of Buryatia
- District: Barguzinsky District
- Time zone: UTC+8:00

Maximikha (Russian: Максимиха) is a rural locality (a selo) in Barguzinsky District, Republic of Buryatia, Russia. The population was 297 as of 2010. There are 26 streets.

== Geography ==
Maximikha is located 83 km southwest of Barguzin (the district's administrative centre) by road. Ust-Barguzin is the nearest rural locality.
