= Gutay, Republic of Buryatia =

Gutay Гутай
- Ulus
- Location within Republic of Buryatia Location within Russia
- Coordinates: 50°44′N 107°45′E
- Country: Russia
- Region: Republic of Buryatia
- District: Bichursky District
- Time zone: UTC+8:00

Gutay (Russian: Гутай) is a rural locality (an ulus) in Bichursky District, Republic of Buryatia, Russia. The population was 209 as of 2010. There are 4 streets.

== Geography ==
Gutay is located 39 km northeast of Bichura (the district's administrative centre) by road. Novosretenka is the nearest rural locality.
