= Blok-post imeni Serova =

Blok-post imeni Serova Блок-пост имени Серова
- Settlement
- Location within Republic of Buryatia Location within Russia
- Coordinates: 51°55′N 108°07′E
- Country: Russia
- Region: Republic of Buryatia
- District: Zaigrayevsky District
- Time zone: UTC+8:00

Blok-post imeni Serova (Russian: Блок-пост имени Серова) is a rural locality (a settlement) in Zaigrayevsky District, Republic of Buryatia, Russia. The population was 52 as of 2010. There are 2 streets.

== Geography ==
The settlement is located 17 km northwest of Zaigrayevo (the district's administrative centre) by road. Onokhoy is the nearest rural locality.
