= Nizhny Mangirtuy =

Nizhny Mangirtuy Нижний Мангиртуй
- Selo
- Location within Republic of Buryatia Location within Russia
- Coordinates: 50°40′N 107°09′E
- Country: Russia
- Region: Republic of Buryatia
- District: Bichursky District
- Time zone: UTC+8:00

Nizhny Mangirtuy (Russian: Нижний Мангиртуй; Buryat: Доодо Мангирта, Doodo Mangirta) is a rural locality (a selo) in Bichursky District, Republic of Buryatia, Russia. The population was 154 as of 2010. There is 1 street.

== Geography ==
Nizhny Mangirtuy is located 40 km northwest of Bichura (the district's administrative centre) by road. Verkhny Mangirtuy is the nearest rural locality.
