= Irakinda =

Irakinda Иракинда
- Settlement
- Location within Republic of Buryatia Location within Russia
- Coordinates: 55°55′N 115°11′E
- Country: Russia
- Region: Republic of Buryatia
- District: Muysky District
- Time zone: UTC+8:00

Irakinda (Russian: Иракинда) is a rural locality (a settlement) in Muysky District, Republic of Buryatia, Russia. The population was 651 as of 2010. There are 8 streets.

== Geography ==
Irakinda is located 77 km southeast of Taksimo (the district's administrative centre) by road. Taksimo is the nearest rural locality.
