= Kharitonovo, Republic of Buryatia =

Kharitonovo Харитоново
- Selo
- Location within Republic of Buryatia Location within Russia
- Coordinates: 51°13′N 106°59′E
- Country: Russia
- Region: Republic of Buryatia
- District: Tarbagataysky District
- Time zone: UTC+8:00

Kharitonovo (Russian: Харитоново) is a rural locality (a selo) in Tarbagataysky District, Republic of Buryatia, Russia. The population was 168 as of 2010. There are 6 streets.

== Geography ==
Kharitonovo is located 57 km southwest of Tarbagatay (the district's administrative centre) by road. Barykino is the nearest rural locality.
