= Novaya Kurba =

Novaya Kurba Новая Курба
- Selo
- Location within Republic of Buryatia Location within Russia
- Coordinates: 52°02′N 108°30′E
- Country: Russia
- Region: Republic of Buryatia
- District: Zaigrayevsky District
- Time zone: UTC+8:00

Novaya Kurba (Russian: Новая Курба; Buryat: Шэнэ Хγрбэ, Shene Khürbe) is a rural locality (a selo) in Zaigrayevsky District, Republic of Buryatia, Russia. The population was 484 as of 2010. There are 8 streets.

== Geography ==
Novaya Kurba is located 41 km northeast of Zaigrayevo (the district's administrative centre) by road. Staraya Kurba is the nearest rural locality.
