= Zandin =

Zandin Зандин
- Ulus
- Location within Republic of Buryatia Location within Russia
- Coordinates: 51°04′N 107°25′E
- Country: Russia
- Region: Republic of Buryatia
- District: Mukhorshibirsky District
- Time zone: UTC+8:00

Zandin (Russian: Зандин; Buryat: Зангин, Zangin) is a rural locality (an ulus) in Mukhorshibirsky District, Republic of Buryatia, Russia. The population was 58 as of 2010. There are 4 streets.

== Geography ==
Zandin is located 35 km west of Mukhorshibir (the district's administrative centre) by road. Gashey is the nearest rural locality.
