= Bilyutay =

Bilyutay Билютай
- Selo
- Location within Republic of Buryatia Location within Russia
- Coordinates: 50°46′N 107°05′E
- Country: Russia
- Region: Republic of Buryatia
- District: Bichursky District
- Time zone: UTC+8:00

Bilyutay (Russian: Билютай; Buryat: Бүлюутэ, Büliuute) is a rural locality (a selo) in Bichursky District, Republic of Buryatia, Russia. The population was 438 as of 2017. There are 5 streets.

== Geography ==
Bilyutay is located 58 km northwest of Bichura (the district's administrative centre) by road. Nizhny Mangirtuy is the nearest rural locality.
