= Khuldat =

Khuldat Хулдат
- Selo
- Location within Republic of Buryatia Location within Russia
- Coordinates: 50°29′N 104°41′E
- Country: Russia
- Region: Republic of Buryatia
- District: Dzhidinsky District
- Time zone: UTC+8:00

Khuldat (Russian: Хулдат) is a rural locality (a selo) in Dzhidinsky District, Republic of Buryatia, Russia. The population was 142 as of 2010.

== Geography ==
Khuldat is located 55 km southwest of Petropavlovka (the district's administrative centre) by road. Naryn is the nearest rural locality.
