= Shabur =

Shabur Шабур
- Selo
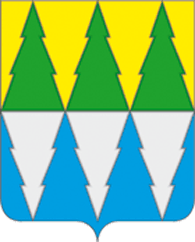
- Flag Seal

- Location within Republic of Buryatia Location within Russia
- Coordinates: 51°28′N 108°09′E
- Country: Russia
- Region: Republic of Buryatia
- District: Zaigrayevsky District
- Time zone: UTC+8:00

Shabur (Russian: Шабур; Buryat: Шабар, Shabar) is a rural locality (a selo) in Zaigrayevsky District, Republic of Buryatia, Russia. The population was 1,235 as of 2010. There are 9 streets.

== Geography ==
Shabur is located 56 km south of Zaigrayevo (the district's administrative centre) by road. Tsagan-Daban is the nearest rural locality.
