= Kalyonovo =

Kalyonovo Калёново
- Selo
- Location within Republic of Buryatia Location within Russia
- Coordinates: 51°45′N 107°06′E
- Country: Russia
- Region: Republic of Buryatia
- District: Ivolginsky District
- Time zone: UTC+8:00

Kalyonovo (Russian: Калёново) is a rural locality (a selo) in Ivolginsky District, Republic of Buryatia, Russia. The population was 949 as of 2010. There are 6 streets.

== Geography ==
Kalyonovo is located 13 km west of Ivolginsk (the district's administrative centre) by road. Verkhnyaya Ivolga is the nearest rural locality.
