= Gashey =

Gashey Гашей
- Selo
- Location within Republic of Buryatia Location within Russia
- Coordinates: 51°02′N 107°22′E
- Country: Russia
- Region: Republic of Buryatia
- District: Mukhorshibirsky District
- Time zone: UTC+8:00

Gashey (Russian: Гашей) is a rural locality (a selo) in Mukhorshibirsky District, Republic of Buryatia, Russia. The population was 534 as of 2010. There are 8 streets.

== Geography ==
Gashey is located 36 km west of Mukhorshibir (the district's administrative centre) by road. Zandin is the nearest rural locality.
