= Starye Klyuchi =

Starye Klyuchi Старые Ключи
- Selo
- Location within Republic of Buryatia Location within Russia
- Coordinates: 50°33′N 107°04′E
- Country: Russia
- Region: Republic of Buryatia
- District: Bichursky District
- Time zone: UTC+8:00

Starye Klyuchi (Russian: Старые Ключи) is a rural locality (a selo) in Bichursky District, Republic of Buryatia, Russia. The population was 179 as of 2010. There are 2 streets.

== Geography ==
Starye Klyuchi is located 43 km west of Bichura (the district's administrative centre) by road. Okino-Klyuchi is the nearest rural locality.
