= Kharlun =

Kharlun Харлун
- Settlement
- Location within Republic of Buryatia Location within Russia
- Coordinates: 50°35′N 106°52′E
- Country: Russia
- Region: Republic of Buryatia
- District: Bichursky District
- Time zone: UTC+8:00

Kharlun (Russian: Харлун; Buryat: Харлан, Kharlan) is a rural locality (a settlement) in Bichursky District, Republic of Buryatia, Russia. The population was 34 as of 2010. There are 3 streets.

== Geography ==
Kharlun is located 54 km west of Bichura (the district's administrative centre) by road. Sredny Kharlun is the nearest rural locality.
