= Karaftit =

Karaftit Карафтит
- Settlement
- Location within Republic of Buryatia Location within Russia
- Coordinates: 54°12′N 111°55′E
- Country: Russia
- Region: Republic of Buryatia
- District: Bauntovsky District
- Time zone: UTC+8:00

Karaftit (Russian: Карафтит) is a rural locality (a settlement) in Bauntovsky District, Republic of Buryatia, Russia. The population was 4 as of 2010. There is 1 street.

== Geography ==
Karaftit is located 1,085 km west of Bagdarin (the district's administrative centre) by road.
