= Khuzhiry =

Khuzhiry Хужиры
- Ulus
- Location within Republic of Buryatia Location within Russia
- Coordinates: 51°40′N 102°05′E
- Country: Russia
- Region: Republic of Buryatia
- District: Tunkinsky District
- Time zone: UTC+8:00

Khuzhiry (Russian: Хужиры; Buryat: Хужар, Khujar) is a rural locality (an ulus) in Tunkinsky District, Republic of Buryatia, Russia. The population was 951 as of 2010. There are 23 streets.

== Geography ==
Khuzhiry is located 3 km west of Kyren (the district's administrative centre) by road. Mogoy-Gorkhon is the nearest rural locality.
