= Khayan, Republic of Buryatia =

Khayan Хаян
- Ulus
- Location within Republic of Buryatia Location within Russia
- Coordinates: 50°36′N 107°17′E
- Country: Russia
- Region: Republic of Buryatia
- District: Bichursky District
- Time zone: UTC+8:00

Khayan (Russian: Хаян) is a rural locality (an ulus) in Bichursky District, Republic of Buryatia, Russia. The population was 151 as of 2010. There are 3 streets.

== Geography ==
Khayan is located 23 km west of Bichura (the district's administrative centre) by road. Ara-Kiret is the nearest rural locality.
