= Shigayevo, Republic of Buryatia =

Shigayevo Шигаево
- Selo
- Location within Republic of Buryatia Location within Russia
- Coordinates: 52°10′N 106°28′E
- Country: Russia
- Region: Republic of Buryatia
- District: Kabansky District
- Time zone: UTC+8:00

Shigayevo (Russian: Шигаево) is a rural locality (a selo) in Kabansky District, Republic of Buryatia, Russia. The population was 513 as of 2010. There are 5 streets.

== Geography ==
Shigayevo is located 21 km northwest of Kabansk (the district's administrative centre) by road. Murzino is the nearest rural locality.
