= Khargana =

Khargana Харгана
- Ulus
- Location within Republic of Buryatia Location within Russia
- Coordinates: 54°03′N 110°16′E
- Country: Russia
- Region: Republic of Buryatia
- District: Kurumkansky District
- Time zone: UTC+8:00

Khargana (Russian: Харгана) is a rural locality (an ulus) in Kurumkansky District, Republic of Buryatia, Russia. The population was 60 as of 2010.
