= Sredny Ubukun =

Sredny Ubukun Средний Убукун
- Selo
- Location within Republic of Buryatia Location within Russia
- Coordinates: 51°27′N 106°43′E
- Country: Russia
- Region: Republic of Buryatia
- District: Selenginsky District
- Time zone: UTC+8:00

Sredny Ubukun (Russian: Средний Убукун; Buryat: Дунда Бγхэн, Dunda Bükhen) is a rural locality (a selo) in Selenginsky District, Republic of Buryatia, Russia. The population was 310 as of 2010. There are 5 streets.

== Geography ==
Sredny Ubukun is located 29 km northeast of Gusinoozyorsk (the district's administrative centre) by road. Zhargalatna is the nearest rural locality.
