= Kudara-Somon =

Kudara-Somon Кудара-Сомон
- Selo
- Location within Republic of Buryatia Location within Russia
- Coordinates: 50°09′N 107°23′E
- Country: Russia
- Region: Republic of Buryatia
- District: Kyakhtinsky District
- Time zone: UTC+8:00

Kudara-Somon (Russian: Кудара-Сомон; Buryat: Хүдэри Һомон, Khüderi Homon) is a rural locality (a selo) in Kyakhtinsky District, Republic of Buryatia, Russia. The population was 1,371 as of 2010. There are 21 streets.

== Geography ==
Kudara-Somon is located 90 km southeast of Kyakhta (the district's administrative centre) by road. Ara Altsagat is the nearest rural locality.
