= Poselye =

Poselye Поселье
- Selo
- Location within Republic of Buryatia Location within Russia
- Coordinates: 50°36′N 107°53′E
- Country: Russia
- Region: Republic of Buryatia
- District: Bichursky District
- Time zone: UTC+8:00

Poselye (Russian: Поселье) is a rural locality (a selo) in Bichursky District, Republic of Buryatia, Russia. The population was 529 as of 2010. There are 6 streets.

== Geography ==
Poselye is located 28 km east of Bichura (the district's administrative centre) by road. Sloboda is the nearest rural locality.
