= Ust-Urma =

Ust-Urma Усть-Урма
- Ulus
- Location within Republic of Buryatia Location within Russia
- Coordinates: 51°03′N 105°58′E
- Country: Russia
- Region: Republic of Buryatia
- District: Selenginsky District
- Time zone: UTC+8:00

Ust-Urma (Russian: Усть-Урма; Buryat: Υрмын Адаг, Ürmyn Adag) is a rural locality (an ulus) in Selenginsky District, Republic of Buryatia, Russia. The population was 267 as of 2010. There are nine streets.

== Geography ==
Ust-Urma is located 70 km southwest of Gusinoozyorsk (the district's administrative centre) by road. Gusinoye Ozero is the nearest rural locality.
