= Bolshoye Kolesovo =

Bolshoye Kolesovo Большое Колесово
- Selo
- Location within Republic of Buryatia Location within Russia
- Coordinates: 52°06′N 106°32′E
- Country: Russia
- Region: Republic of Buryatia
- District: Kabansky District
- Time zone: UTC+8:00

Bolshoye Kolesovo (Russian: Большое Колесово) is a rural locality (a selo) in Kabansky District, Republic of Buryatia, Russia. The population was 668 as of 2010. There are 12 streets.

== Geography ==
Bolshoye Kolesovo is located 11 km (6.8 mi) northwest of Kabansk (the district's administrative centre) by road. Maloye Kolesovo is the nearest rural locality.
