= Novodesyatnikovo =

Novodesyatnikovo Новодесятниково
- Selo
- Location within Republic of Buryatia Location within Russia
- Coordinates: 50°47′N 106°42′E
- Country: Russia
- Region: Republic of Buryatia
- District: Kyakhtinsky District
- Time zone: UTC+8:00

Novodesyatnikovo (Russian: Новодесятниково) is a rural locality (a selo) in Kyakhtinsky District, Republic of Buryatia, Russia. The population was 270 as of 2010. There are 4 streets.

== Geography ==
Novodesyatnikovo is located 64 km northeast of Kyakhta (the district's administrative centre) by road. Kharyasta is the nearest rural locality.
