= Verkhny Burgaltay =

Verkhny Burgaltay Верхний Бургалтай
- Selo
- Location within Republic of Buryatia Location within Russia
- Coordinates: 50°36′N 105°03′E
- Country: Russia
- Region: Republic of Buryatia
- District: Dzhidinsky District
- Time zone: UTC+8:00

Verkhny Burgaltay (Russian: Верхний Бургалтай; Buryat: Дээдэ Бургалтай, Deede Burgaltai) is a rural locality (a selo) in Dzhidinsky District, Republic of Buryatia, Russia. The population was 187 as of 2017. There are 15 streets.

== Geography ==
Verkhny Burgaltay is located 23 km west of Petropavlovka (the district's administrative centre) by road. Nizhny Burgaltay is the nearest rural locality.
