= Gremyachinsk, Republic of Buryatia =

Gremyachinsk Гремячинск
- Selo
- Location within Republic of Buryatia Location within Russia
- Coordinates: 52°47′N 107°58′E
- Country: Russia
- Region: Republic of Buryatia
- District: Pribaykalsky District
- Time zone: UTC+8:00

Gremyachinsk (Russian: Гремячинск) is a rural locality (a selo) in Pribaykalsky District, Republic of Buryatia, Russia. The population was 846 as of 2010. There are 21 streets.

== Geography ==
Gremyachinsk is located 88 km north of Turuntayevo (the district's administrative centre) by road. Kotokel is the nearest rural locality.
