= Darkhhita =

Darkhhita Дархита
- Ulus
- Location within Republic of Buryatia Location within Russia
- Coordinates: 51°40′N 108°43′E
- Country: Russia
- Region: Republic of Buryatia
- District: Zaigrayevsky District
- Time zone: UTC+8:00

Darkhhita (Russian: Дархита) is a rural locality (an ulus) in Zaigrayevsky District, Republic of Buryatia, Russia. The population was 256 as of 2010.

== Geography ==
Darkhhita is located 41 km southeast of Zaigrayevo (the district's administrative centre) by road. Tashelan is the nearest rural locality.
