= Zun-Khuray =

Zun-Khuray Зун-Хурай
- Settlement
- Location within Republic of Buryatia Location within Russia
- Coordinates: 52°10′N 110°03′E
- Country: Russia
- Region: Republic of Buryatia
- District: Khorinsky District
- Time zone: UTC+8:00

Zun-Khuray (Russian: Зун-Хурай) is a rural locality (a settlement) in Khorinsky District, Republic of Buryatia, Russia. The population was 383 as of 2010. There are 6 streets.

== Geography ==
Zun-Khuray is located 63 km east of Khorinsk (the district's administrative centre) by road. Oninoborsk is the nearest rural locality.
