= Bom, Republic of Buryatia =

Ulus in Mukhorshibirsky, Buryatia, Russia

Bom Бом
- Ulus
- Location within Republic of Buryatia Location within Russia
- Coordinates: 51°13′N 108°01′E
- Country: Russia
- Region: Republic of Buryatia
- District: Mukhorshibirsky District
- Time zone: UTC+8:00

Bom (Russian: Бом; Buryat: Боомо, Boomo) is a rural locality (an ulus) in Mukhorshibirsky District, Republic of Buryatia, Russia. The population was 367 as of 2010. There are 9 streets.

== Geography ==
Bom is located 43 km northeast of Mukhorshibir (the district's administrative centre) by road. Tugnuy is the nearest rural locality.
