= Zaktuy =

Zaktuy Зактуй
- Selo
- Location within Republic of Buryatia Location within Russia
- Coordinates: 51°41′N 102°37′E
- Country: Russia
- Region: Republic of Buryatia
- District: Tunkinsky District
- Time zone: UTC+8:00

Zaktuy (Russian: Зактуй; Buryat: Загтад, Zagtad) is a rural locality (a selo) in Tunkinsky District, Republic of Buryatia, Russia. The population was 191 as of 2010. There are 4 streets.

== Geography ==
Zaktuy is located 36 km east of Kyren (the district's administrative centre) by road. Tunka is the nearest rural locality.
