= Kharyastka =

Kharyastka Харьястка
- Ulus
- Location within Republic of Buryatia Location within Russia
- Coordinates: 51°14′N 107°39′E
- Country: Russia
- Region: Republic of Buryatia
- District: Mukhorshibirsky District
- Time zone: UTC+8:00

Kharyastka (Russian: Харьястка; Buryat: Харьяастай) is a rural locality (an ulus) in Mukhorshibirsky District, Republic of Buryatia, Russia. The population was 898 as of 2010. There are 3 streets.

== Geography ==
Kharyastka is located 38 km northwest of Mukhorshibir (the district's administrative centre) by road. Khoshun-Uzur is the nearest rural locality.
