= Boyarsky, Republic of Buryatia =

Boyarsky Боярский
- Settlement
- Location within Republic of Buryatia Location within Russia
- Coordinates: 51°50′N 106°04′E
- Country: Russia
- Region: Republic of Buryatia
- District: Kabansky District
- Time zone: UTC+8:00

Boyarsky (Russian: Боярский) is a rural locality (a settlement) in Kabansky District, Republic of Buryatia, Russia. The population was 149 as of 2010.
