= Tsagatuy =

Tsagatuy Цагатуй
- Selo
- Location within Republic of Buryatia Location within Russia
- Coordinates: 50°43′N 105°18′E
- Country: Russia
- Region: Republic of Buryatia
- District: Dzhidinsky District
- Time zone: UTC+8:00

Tsagatuy (Russian: Цагатуй; Buryat: Сагаатай, Sagaatai) is a rural locality (a selo) and the administrative centre of Tsagatuyskoye Rural Settlement, Dzhidinsky District, Republic of Buryatia, Russia. The population was 698 as of 2017. There are 6 streets.

== Geography ==
Tsagatuy is located 13 km north of Petropavlovka (the district's administrative centre) by road. Dede-Ichyotuy is the nearest rural locality.
