= Zarubino, Republic of Buryatia =

Zarubino Зарубино
- Selo
- Location within Republic of Buryatia Location within Russia
- Coordinates: 50°35′N 106°11′E
- Country: Russia
- Region: Republic of Buryatia
- District: Dzhidinsky District
- Time zone: UTC+8:00

Zarubino (Russian: Зарубино) is a rural locality (a selo) in Dzhidinsky District, Republic of Buryatia, Russia. The population was 273 as of 2010. There are 2 streets.

== Geography ==
Zarubino is located 71 km east of Petropavlovka (the district's administrative centre) by road. Dyrestuy and Dzhida are the nearest rural localities.
