= Novy Enkheluk =

Novy Enkheluk Новый Энхэлук
- Settlement
- Location within Republic of Buryatia Location within Russia
- Coordinates: 52°29′N 106°58′E
- Country: Russia
- Region: Republic of Buryatia
- District: Kabansky District
- Time zone: UTC+8:00

Novy Enkheluk (Russian: Новый Энхэлук; Buryat: Шэнэ Ёнхолог, Shene Yonkholog) is a rural locality (a settlement) in Kabansky District, Republic of Buryatia, Russia. The population was 172 as of 2010. There are 12 streets.

== Geography ==
Novy Enkheluk is located 86 km northeast of Kabansk (the district's administrative centre) by road. Enkhaluk is the nearest rural locality.
