= Ust-Antose =

Ust-Antose Усть-Антосе
- Settlement
- Location within Republic of Buryatia Location within Russia
- Coordinates: 53°58′N 113°11′E
- Country: Russia
- Region: Republic of Buryatia
- District: Bauntovsky District
- Time zone: UTC+8:00

Ust-Antose (Russian: Усть-Антосе) is a rural locality (a settlement) in Bauntovsky District, Republic of Buryatia, Russia. The population was 4 as of 2010.

== Geography ==
Ust-Antose is located 79 km southwest of Bagdarin (the district's administrative centre) by road.
