= Shazagay =

Shazagay Шазагай
- Selo
- Location within Republic of Buryatia Location within Russia
- Coordinates: 50°16′N 107°19′E
- Country: Russia
- Region: Republic of Buryatia
- District: Kyakhtinsky District
- Time zone: UTC+8:00

Shazagay (Russian: Шазагай; Buryat: Шаазгай, Shaazgai) is a rural locality (a selo) in Kyakhtinsky District, Republic of Buryatia, Russia. The population was 163 as of 2010. There is 1 street.

== Geography ==
Shazagay is located 83 km southeast of Kyakhta (the district's administrative centre) by road. Tamir is the nearest rural locality.
