= Subuktuy =

Subuktuy Субуктуй
- Ulus
- Location within Republic of Buryatia Location within Russia
- Coordinates: 50°33′N 106°25′E
- Country: Russia
- Region: Republic of Buryatia
- District: Kyakhtinsky District
- Time zone: UTC+8:00

Subuktuy (Russian: Субуктуй; Buryat: Һубагтай, Hubagtai) is a rural locality (an ulus) in Kyakhtinsky District, Republic of Buryatia, Russia. The population was 255 as of 2010. There are 6 streets.

== Geography ==
Subuktuy is located 31 km north of Kyakhta (the district's administrative centre) by road. Ust-Kyakhta is the nearest rural locality.
