= Dabatuy =

Dabatuy Дабатуй
- Ulus
- Location within Republic of Buryatia Location within Russia
- Coordinates: 50°48′N 107°56′E
- Country: Russia
- Region: Republic of Buryatia
- District: Bichursky District
- Time zone: UTC+8:00

Dabatuy (Russian: Дабатуй; Buryat: Дабһатай, Dabhatai) is a rural locality (an ulus) in Bichursky District, Republic of Buryatia, Russia. The population was 313 as of 2010. There are 5 streets.

== Geography ==
Dabatuy is located 46 km northeast of Bichura (the district's administrative centre) by road. Shibertuy is the nearest rural locality.
