= Nizhny Zhirim =

Nizhny Zhirim Нижний Жирим
- Selo
- Location within Republic of Buryatia Location within Russia
- Coordinates: 51°25′N 107°11′E
- Country: Russia
- Region: Republic of Buryatia
- District: Tarbagataysky District
- Time zone: UTC+8:00

Nizhny Zhirim (Russian: Нижний Жирим) is a rural locality (a selo) in Tarbagataysky District, Republic of Buryatia, Russia. The population was 461 as of 2010. There are 2 streets.

== Geography ==
Nizhny Zhirim is located 15 km southwest of Tarbagatay (the district's administrative centre) by road. Tarbagatay is the nearest rural locality.
