= Lesovozny =

Lesovozny Лесовозный
- Passing loop
- Location within Republic of Buryatia Location within Russia
- Coordinates: 52°06′N 107°14′E
- Country: Russia
- Region: Republic of Buryatia
- District: Pribaykalsky District
- Time zone: UTC+8:00

Lesovozny (Russian: Лесовозный) is a rural locality (a passing loop) in Pribaykalsky District, Republic of Buryatia, Russia. The population was 116 as of 2010.
