= Novaya Derevnya, Republic of Buryatia =

Novaya Derevnya Новая Деревня
- Selo
- Location within Republic of Buryatia Location within Russia
- Coordinates: 52°09′N 106°36′E
- Country: Russia
- Region: Republic of Buryatia
- District: Kabansky District
- Time zone: UTC+8:00

Novaya Derevnya (Russian: Новая Деревня) is a rural locality (a selo) in Kabansky District, Republic of Buryatia, Russia. The population was 60 as of 2010. There are 10 streets.

== Geography ==
Novaya Derevnya is located 47 km (29 mi) north of Kabansk (the district's administrative centre) by road. Krasny Yar is the nearest rural locality.
