= Ganzurino (station) =

Ganzurino Ганзурино
- Station
- Location within Republic of Buryatia Location within Russia
- Coordinates: 51°30′N 107°11′E
- Country: Russia
- Region: Republic of Buryatia
- District: Ivolginsky District
- Time zone: UTC+8:00

Ganzurino (Russian: Ганзурино) is a rural locality (a station) in Ivolginsky District, Republic of Buryatia, Russia. The population was 149 as of 2010. There are 2 streets.
