= Yekhe-Tsakir =

Yekhe-Tsakir Ехэ-Цакир
- Selo
- Location within Republic of Buryatia Location within Russia
- Coordinates: 50°28′N 103°30′E
- Country: Russia
- Region: Republic of Buryatia
- District: Zakamensky District
- Time zone: UTC+8:00

Yekhe-Tsakir (Russian: Ехэ-Цакир) is a rural locality (a selo) in Zakamensky District, Republic of Buryatia, Russia. The population was 668 as of 2010. There are 5 streets.

== Geography ==
Yekhe-Tsakir is located 24 km southwest of Zakamensk (the district's administrative centre) by road. Tsakir is the nearest rural locality.
