= Ubukun =

Ubukun Убукун
- Settlement
- Location within Republic of Buryatia Location within Russia
- Coordinates: 51°26′N 106°35′E
- Country: Russia
- Region: Republic of Buryatia
- District: Selenginsky District
- Time zone: UTC+8:00

Ubukun (Russian: Убукун; Buryat: Бухэн, Bukhen) is a rural locality (a settlement) in Selenginsky District, Republic of Buryatia, Russia. The population was 67 as of 2010.
