= Darkhintuy =

Darkhintuy Дархинтуй
- Ulus
- Location within Republic of Buryatia Location within Russia
- Coordinates: 50°35′N 103°18′E
- Country: Russia
- Region: Republic of Buryatia
- District: Zakamensky District
- Time zone: UTC+8:00

Darkhintuy (Russian: Дархинтуй; Buryat: Дархинта, Darkhinta) is a rural locality (an ulus) in Zakamensky District, Republic of Buryatia, Russia. The population was 59 as of 2010. There are 4 streets.

== Geography ==
Darkhintuy is located 35 km north of Zakamensk (the district's administrative centre) by road. Dutulur is the nearest rural locality.
