= Kholtoson =

Kholtoson Холтосон
- Selo
- Location within Republic of Buryatia Location within Russia
- Coordinates: 50°17′N 103°18′E
- Country: Russia
- Region: Republic of Buryatia
- District: Zakamensky District
- Time zone: UTC+8:00

Kholtoson (Russian: Холтосон; Buryat: Холтоһон, Kholtohon) is a rural locality (a selo) in Zakamensky District, Republic of Buryatia, Russia. The population was 877 as of 2010. There are 15 streets.

== Geography ==
Kholtoson is located 10 km south of Zakamensk (the district's administrative centre) by road. Khatsura is the nearest rural locality.
