= Zaozerny, Republic of Buryatia =

Zaozerny Заозёрный
- Settlement
- Location within Republic of Buryatia Location within Russia
- Coordinates: 51°19′N 106°27′E
- Country: Russia
- Region: Republic of Buryatia
- District: Selenginsky District
- Time zone: UTC+8:00

Zaozerny (Russian: Заозёрный) is a rural locality (a settlement) in Selenginsky District, Republic of Buryatia, Russia. The population was 800 as of 2010.
