= Zhargalanta =

Zhargalanta Жаргаланта
- Ulus
- Location within Republic of Buryatia Location within Russia
- Coordinates: 51°24′N 106°39′E
- Country: Russia
- Region: Republic of Buryatia
- District: Selenginsky District
- Time zone: UTC+8:00

Zhargalanta (Russian: Жаргаланта) is a rural locality (an ulus) in Selenginsky District, Republic of Buryatia, Russia. The population was 935 as of 2010. There are 11 streets.

== Geography ==
Zhargalanta is located 22 km north of Gusinoozyorsk (the district's administrative centre) by road. Tokhoy is the nearest rural locality.
