= Barun-Orongoy =

Barun-Orongoy Барун-Оронгой
- Ulus
- Location within Republic of Buryatia Location within Russia
- Coordinates: 51°30′N 107°01′E
- Country: Russia
- Region: Republic of Buryatia
- District: Ivolginsky District
- Time zone: UTC+8:00

Barun-Orongoy (Russian: Барун-Оронгой; Buryat: Баруун Оронго, Baruun Orongo) is a rural locality (an ulus) in Ivolginsky District, Republic of Buryatia, Russia. The population was 48 as of 2010.

== Geography ==
Barun-Orongoy is located 39 km southwest of Ivolginsk (the district's administrative centre) by road. Orongoy is the nearest rural locality.
