= Desyatnikovo =

Locality in the Republic of Buryatia, Russia

Coordinates: 51°25′00″N 107°27′27″E

Desyatnikovo (Russian: Десятниково) is a rural locality (a selo) in Tarbagataysky District of the Republic of Buryatia, Russia.

In 2016 Desyatnikovo was included in The Most Beautiful Villages in Russia.
