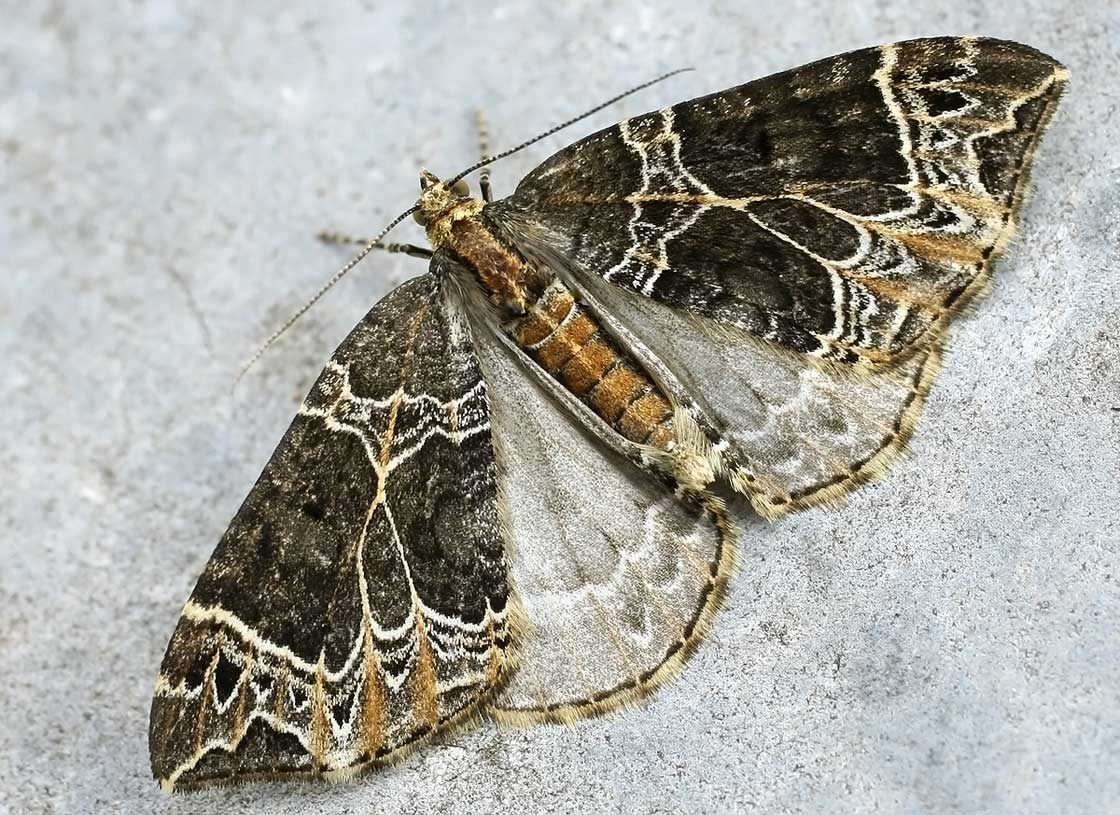

Scientific classification
- Domain: Eukaryota
- Kingdom: Animalia
- Phylum: Arthropoda
- Class: Insecta
- Order: Lepidoptera
- Family: Geometridae
- Genus: Ecliptopera
- Species: E. silaceata

Binomial name
- Ecliptopera silaceata (Denis & Schiffermüller, 1775)

= Ecliptopera silaceata =

Small phoenix

Species of moth

Ecliptopera silaceata, the small phoenix, is a species of moth in the family Geometridae. The species was first described by Michael Denis and Ignaz Schiffermüller in 1775.

The distribution includes most of Europe including the British Isles and extends eastwards through Russia and the Altai and the Vyatskoye, as well as north into the Arctic Circle, and south to the Caucasus. It also occurs in North America.

The wingspan is 23–27 mm. The length of the forewings is 13–17 mm. The basal region is dark grey, and is bordered by a light coloured band in which are mostly dark stains. The very wide discal region is black brown, and often shows a nearly elliptical white "drawing" in the middle. The marginal area is brown with several significant arrow patches. Two or three distally facing peaks continue as orange coloured strokes sometimes up to the outer edge. Below the apex, there are dark arch stains and a white wavy line located at the outer edge. The hind wings are white grey and have bright crosslines as well as a little black heart. The colour of head, thorax, and abdomen is brown. Prout describes some variants. The larva is long and thin, variable in colour, green or flesh-colour, the thoracic and last 4 abdominal segments with a red or blackish mediodorsal line, the middle segments with blackish dots. The venter has a white line, sometimes pink-edged.

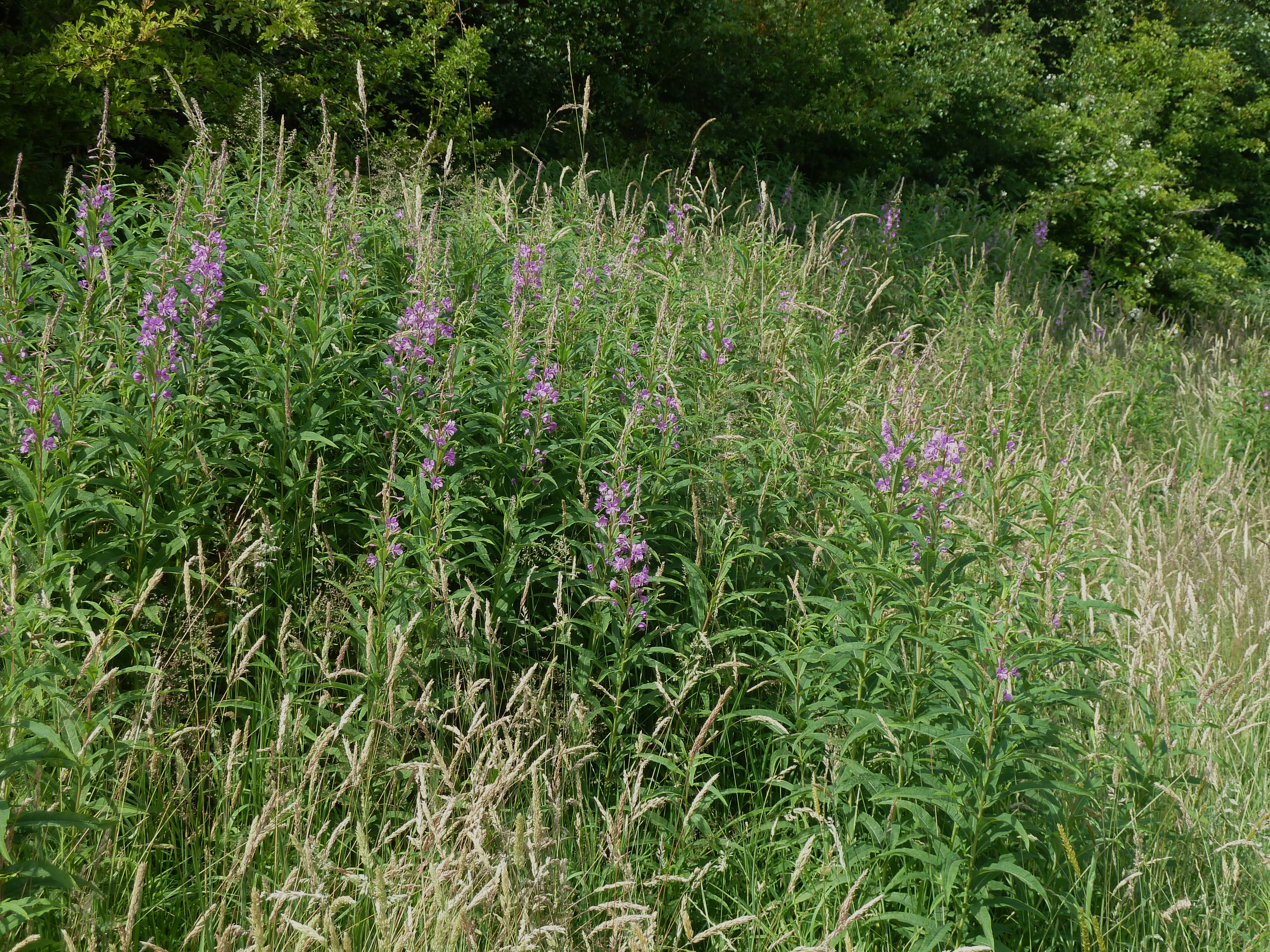
Habitat.Ireland

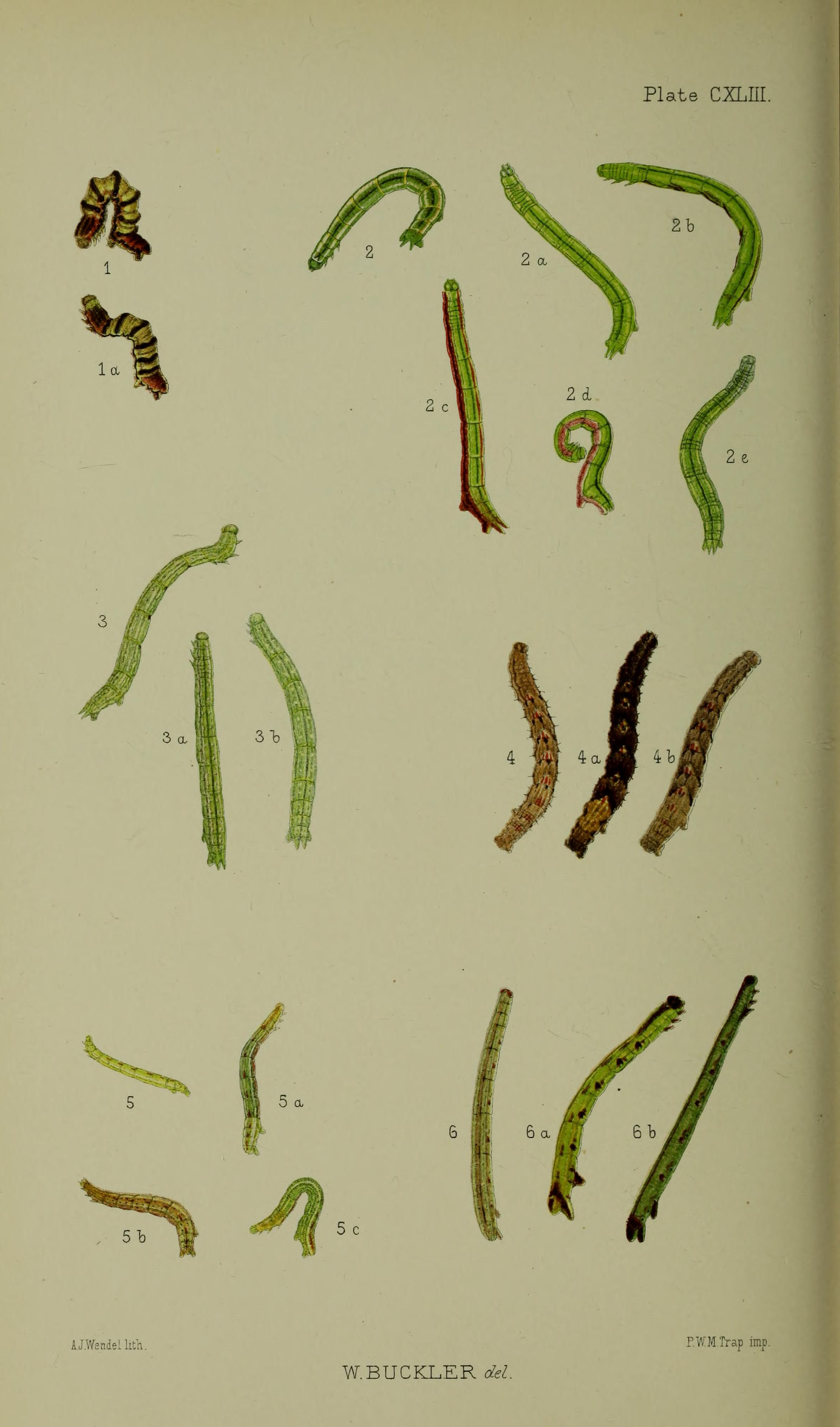
Figs.6, 6a, 6b larvae in various stages

The main habitats of the species are semi-shady areas in deciduous, and mixed forests as well as young forest plantations and heaths.

The moths fly in two generations from May to July and from August to September..

The larvae feed mainly on willowherbs. The compact, brownish green pupa hibernates.

== Similar species ==
- Ecliptopera capitata brighter colours, fewer arrow spots in the post-discal region and the head yellow to orange brown colour of head, thorax, and abdomen.
- Lampropteryx suffumata the bowed spots at the outer edge are more indistinct and extend beyond the wavy line, the transverse lines are more jagged and the ground is more brown.
- Eulithis prunata has a rather brownish ground colour and a more serrated outer transverse line.

The approximately elliptical shaped white vein drawing in the discal field is a sure distinguishing feature to the three species mentioned above. However, this mark is not present in all specimens of silaceata.

== Notes ==
1. The flight season refers to the British Isles. This may vary in other parts of the range.
