= Vyatsky =

Vyatsky (masculine), Vyatskaya (feminine), or Vyatskoye (neuter) may refer to:

- Vyatskoye, Astrakhan Oblast, a village (selo) in Astrakhan Oblast, Russia
- Vyatskoye, Khabarovsk Krai, a village in Khabarovsk Krai, Russia
- Vyatskoye, Mari El Republic, a village (selo) in the Mari El Republic, Russia
- Vyatskoye, Udmurt Republic, a village (selo) in the Udmurt Republic, Russia
- Vyatskoye, Yaroslavl Oblast, a village (selo) in Yaroslavl Oblast, Russia
