= Bolshoy Kunaley =

Village in Tarbagataysky District, Buryatia, Russia

Coordinates: 51°25′56″N 107°36′20″E

Bolshoy Kunaley (Russian: Большой Куналей; Buryat: Ехэ Хунилаа, Yekhe Khunilaa) is a rural locality (a selo) in Tarbagataysky District of the Republic of Buryatia, Russia.

In 2016 Bolshoy Kunaley was included in The Most Beautiful Villages in Russia.
