= The Most Beautiful Villages in Russia =

Russian association established in 2014 to promote rural tourism

The Most Beautiful Villages in Russia (Russian: Ассоциация самых красивых деревень и городков России) is an association established in Russia in 2014 to promote rural tourism. It is part of an international network including Les Plus Beaux Villages de France and The Most Beautiful Villages in Japan. It is affiliated to the international association The Most Beautiful Villages in the World.

== History and mission ==
The association was co-founded by Alexander Merzlov, professor of agritourism at the Russian State Agrarian University – Moscow Timiryazev Agricultural Academy, and entrepreneur Ivan Kulinstev. Inspired by the French model launched in 1982, the Russian branch aims to preserve architectural, natural, and gastronomic heritage, while promoting tourism and creating jobs in rural areas.

Membership grants access to two brands: The Most Beautiful Villages of Russia and The Most Beautiful Villages of the World. These labels help attract tourists and promote local products. In some cases, membership has doubled or tripled visitor numbers, encouraged the return of urban dwellers to the countryside, and raised land and property values.

Vyatskoye, Yaroslavl Oblast, one of the first members of the association, is noted for its increase in tourist numbers and creation of new jobs. Selected villages are regularly highlighted by Russian media and travel services as attractive destinations for cultural and ecological tourism. For example, in 2023 the travel service Tutu.ru named several association members, including Vyatskoye, Staraya Ladoga, and Kimzha, among the most notable rural destinations in the country. Merzlov described the label as a “powerful brand” that can provide a stimulus to local economic growth, particularly when combined with national tourism initiatives.

By 2019, over 2,500 settlements had applied. As of 2025, only two of the members had achieved the maximum possible evaluation score.

== Selection process ==
Villages and small towns wishing to join the association must submit an application supported by local residents and authorities. Criteria include: preservation of traditional architecture and landscape harmony, active community life rather than a "museum village", availability of gastronomy and hospitality, ecological standards, safety, and a cultural events calendar. Villages can score up to 103 points, and at least 40 are required for admission. The higher the score, the higher the village’s status within the association.

Experts carry out inspections before granting membership. Status is awarded for five years, with the possibility of renewal if criteria continue to be met. Villages may also lose the title if they misuse the brand or fail to uphold standards.

== Selected member villages ==
Arkhangelsk Oblast

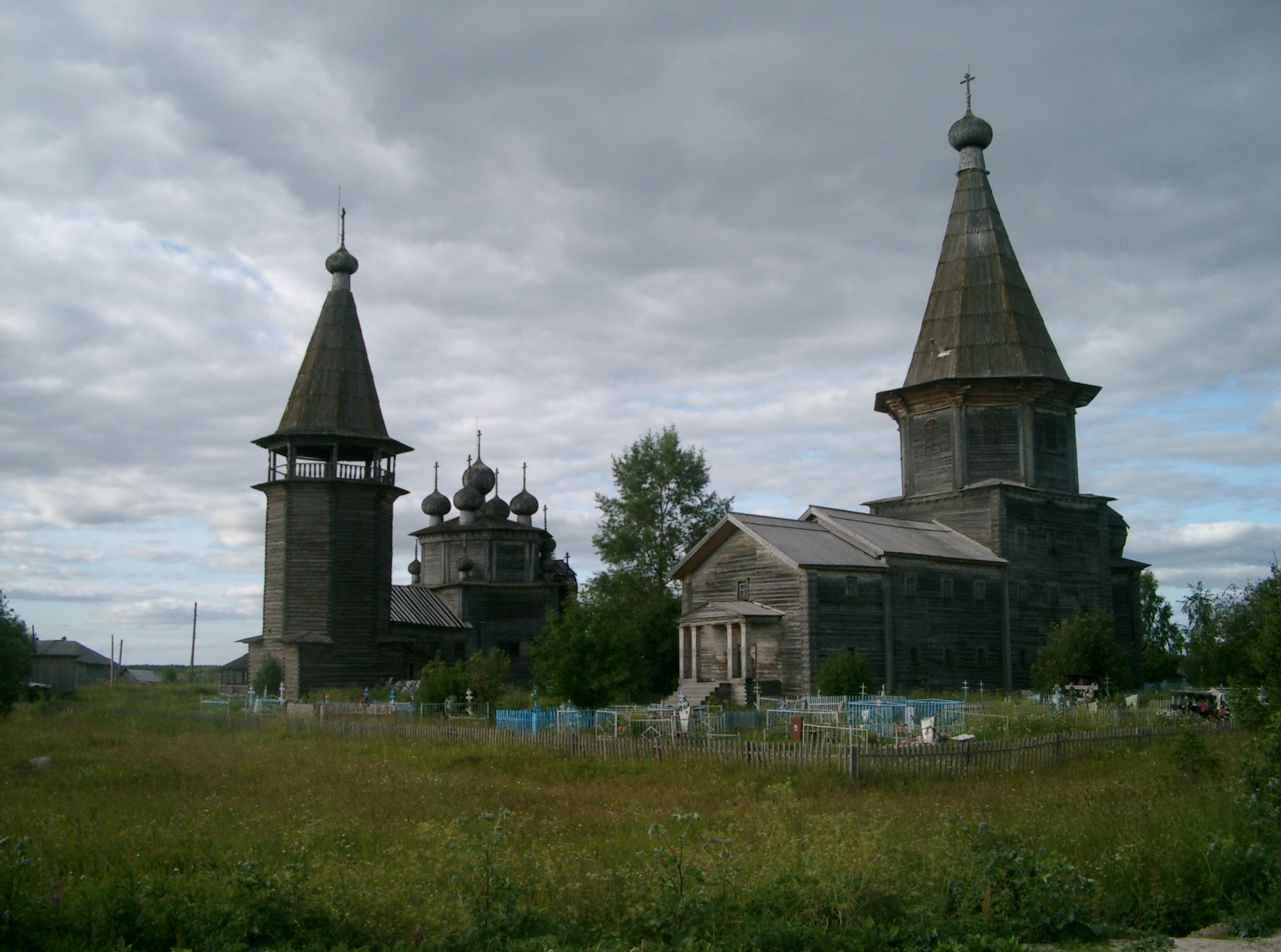
Gavrilovskaya

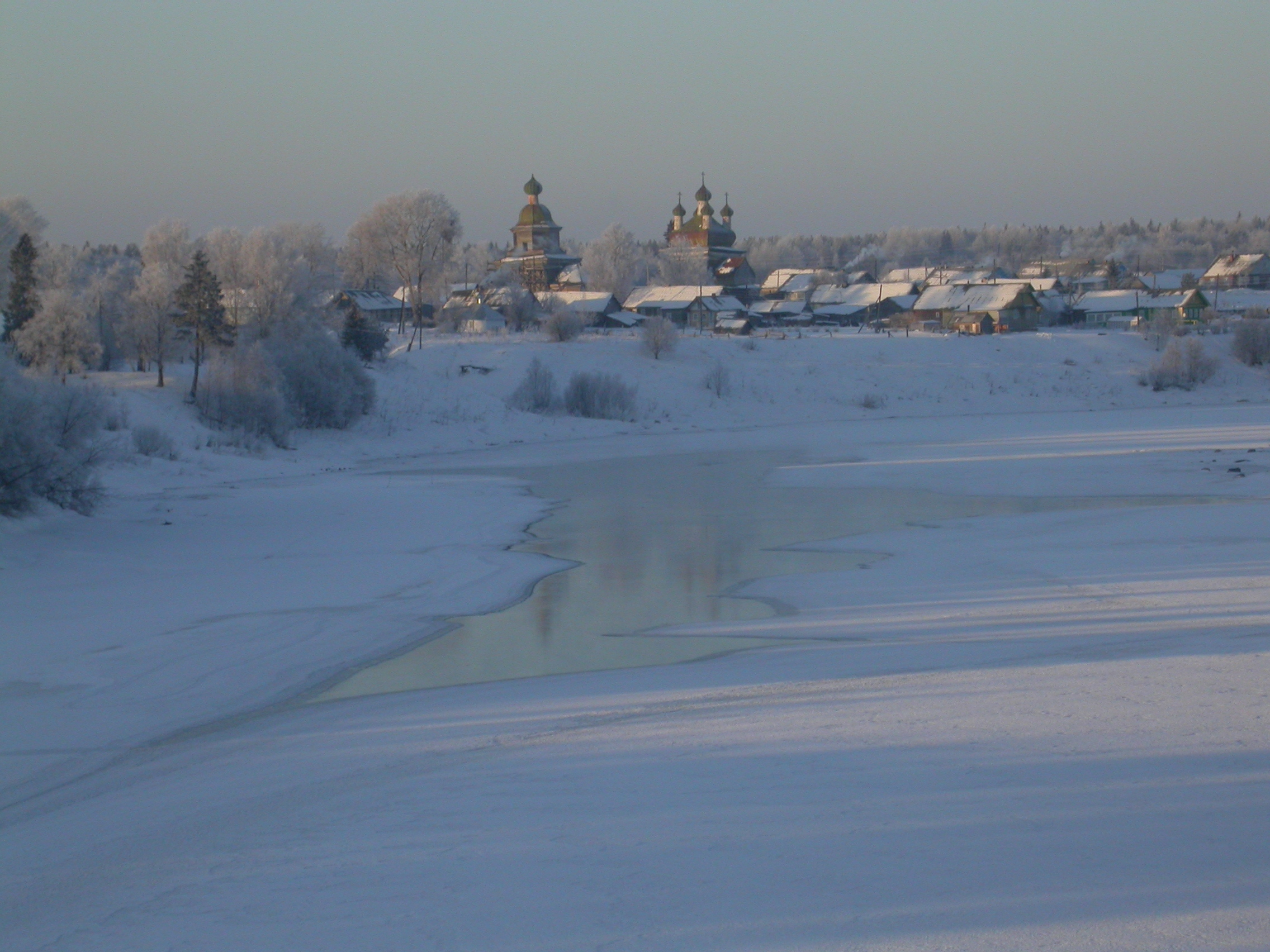
Arkhangelo

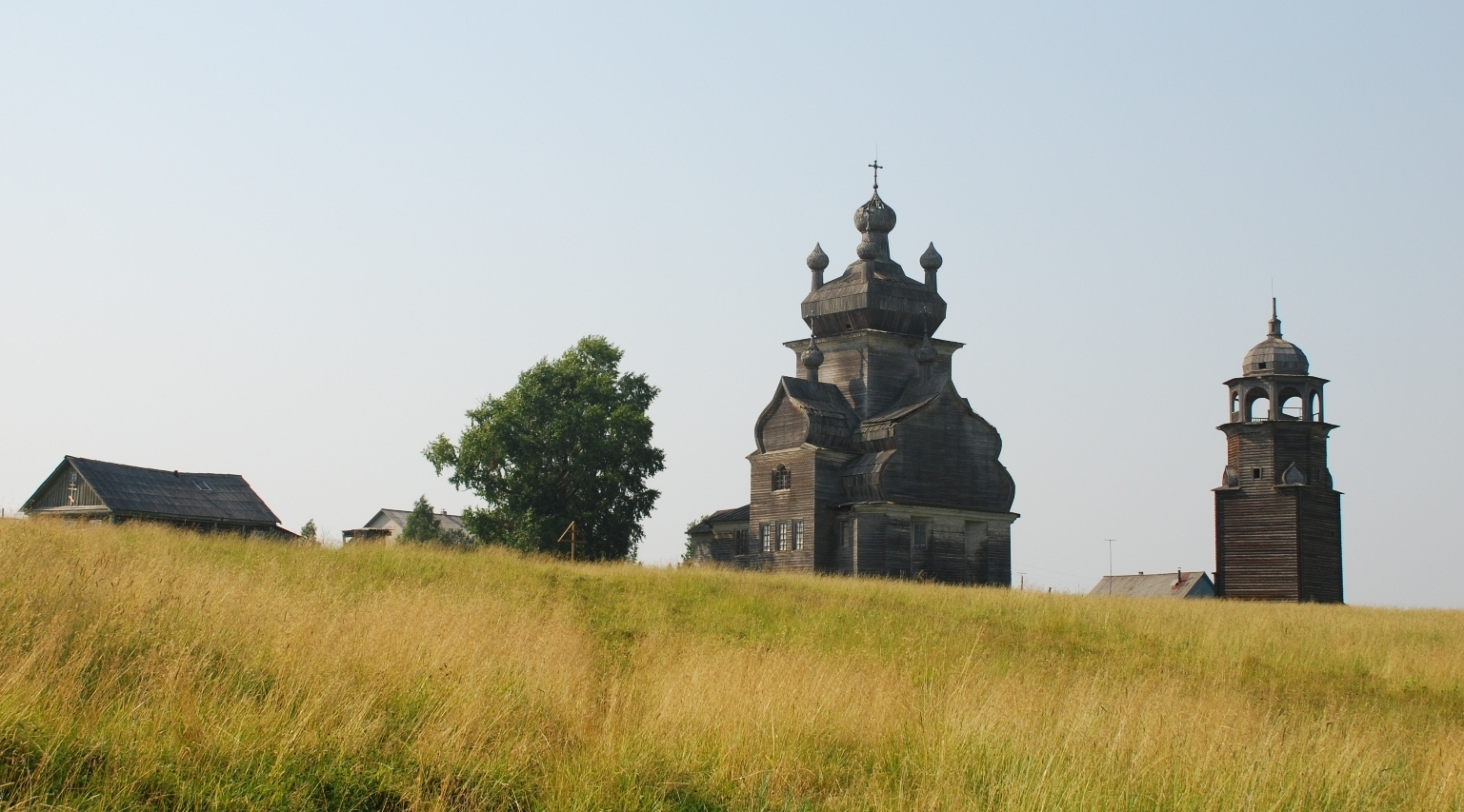
Turchasovo

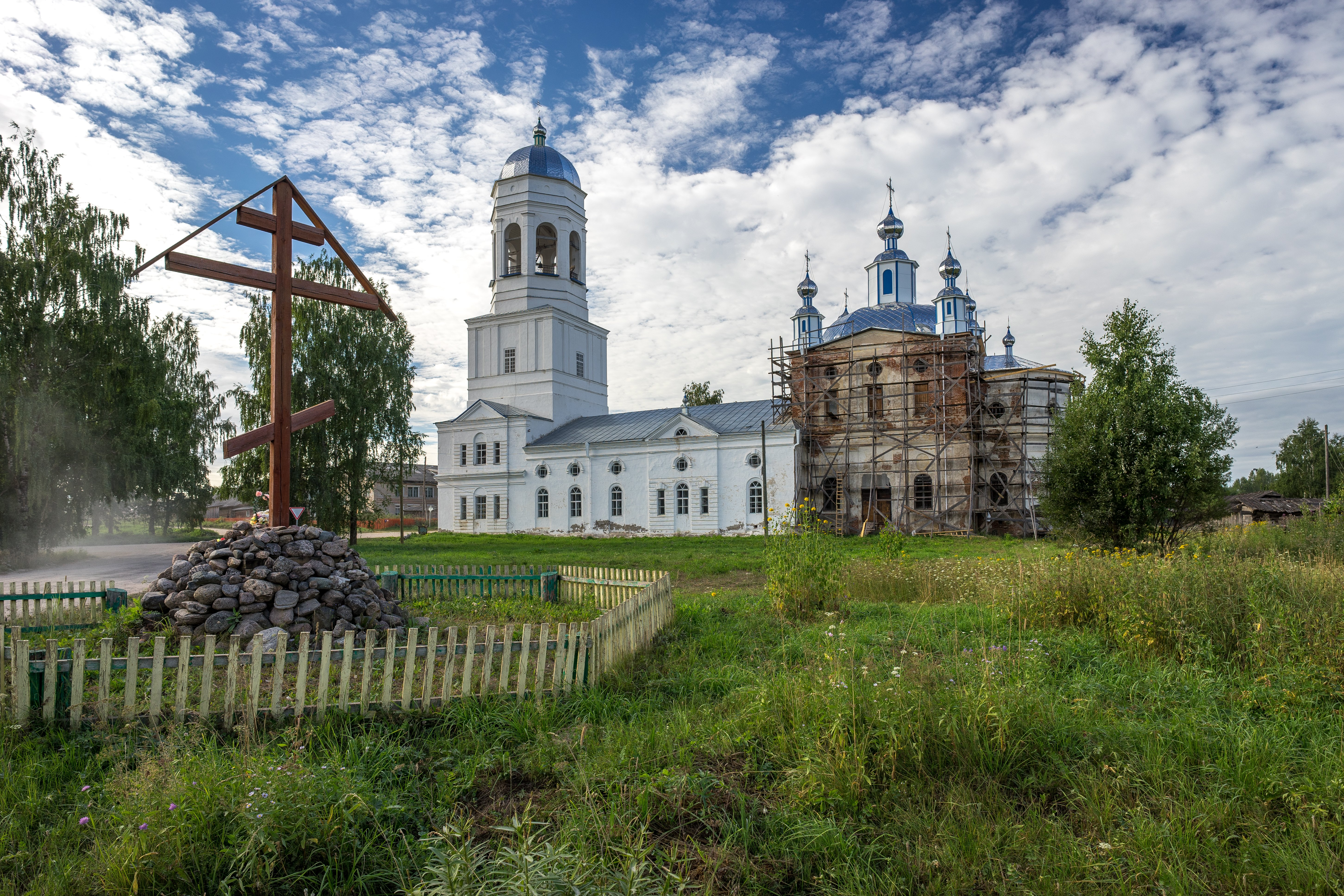
Pezhma

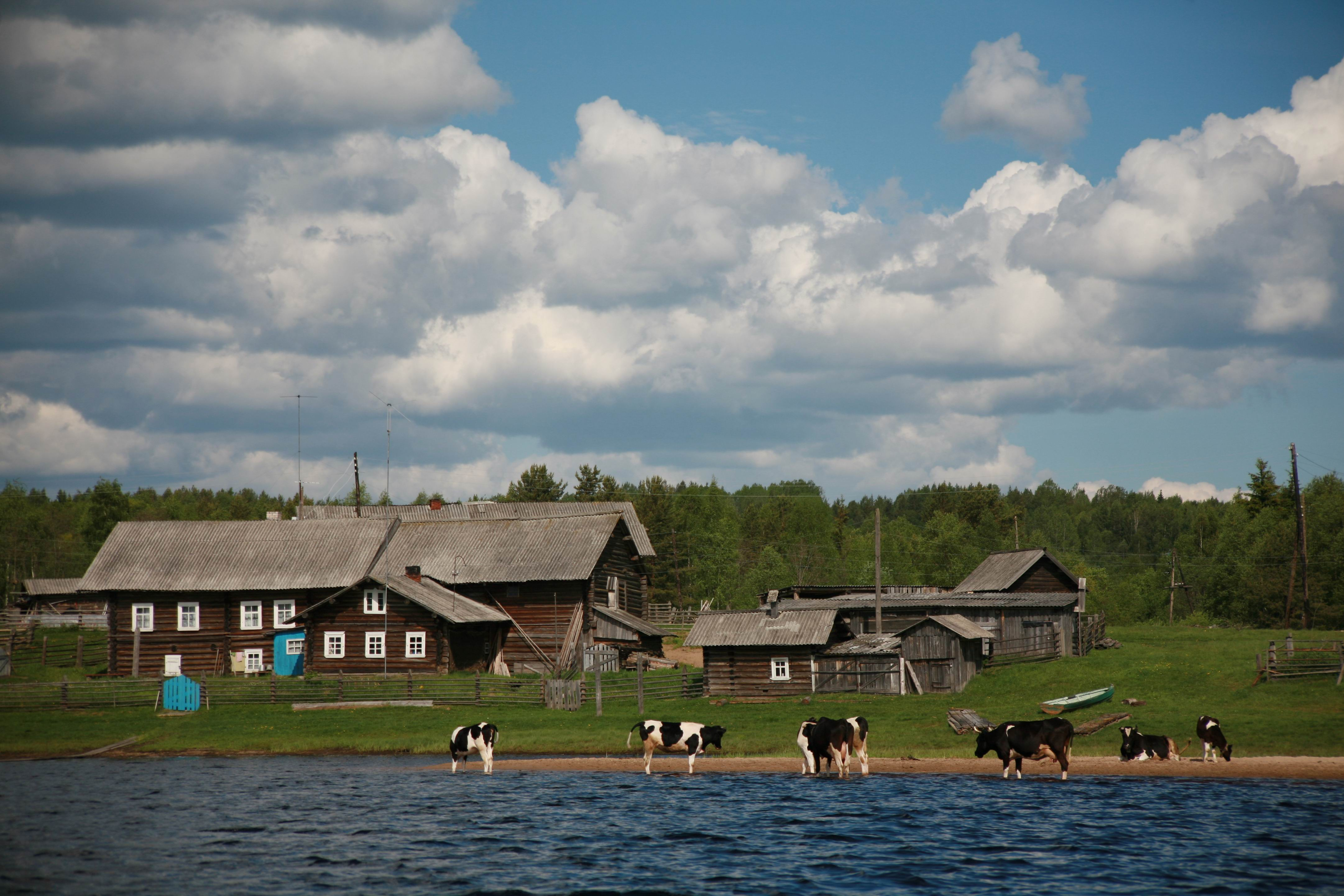
Kositsyna

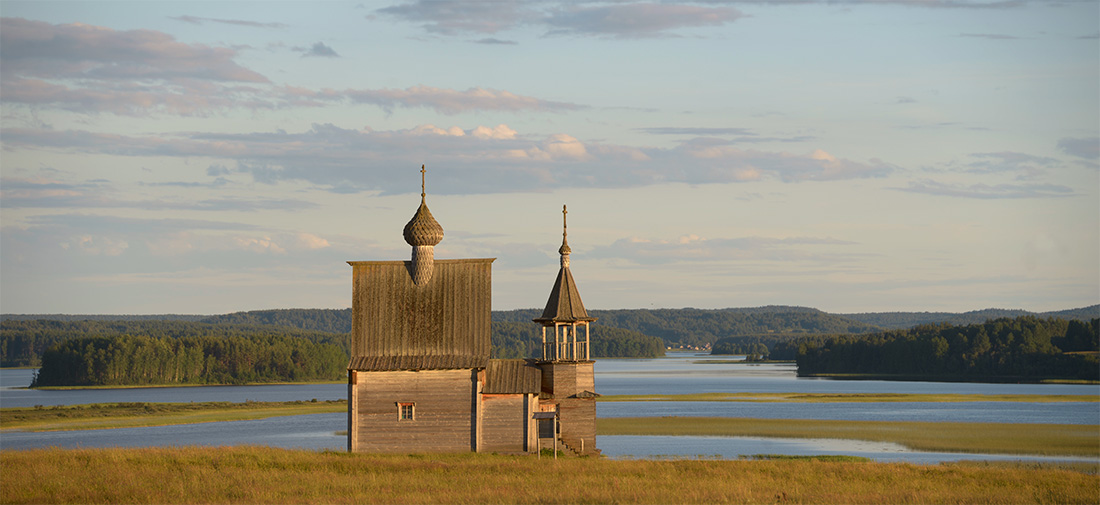
Vershinino

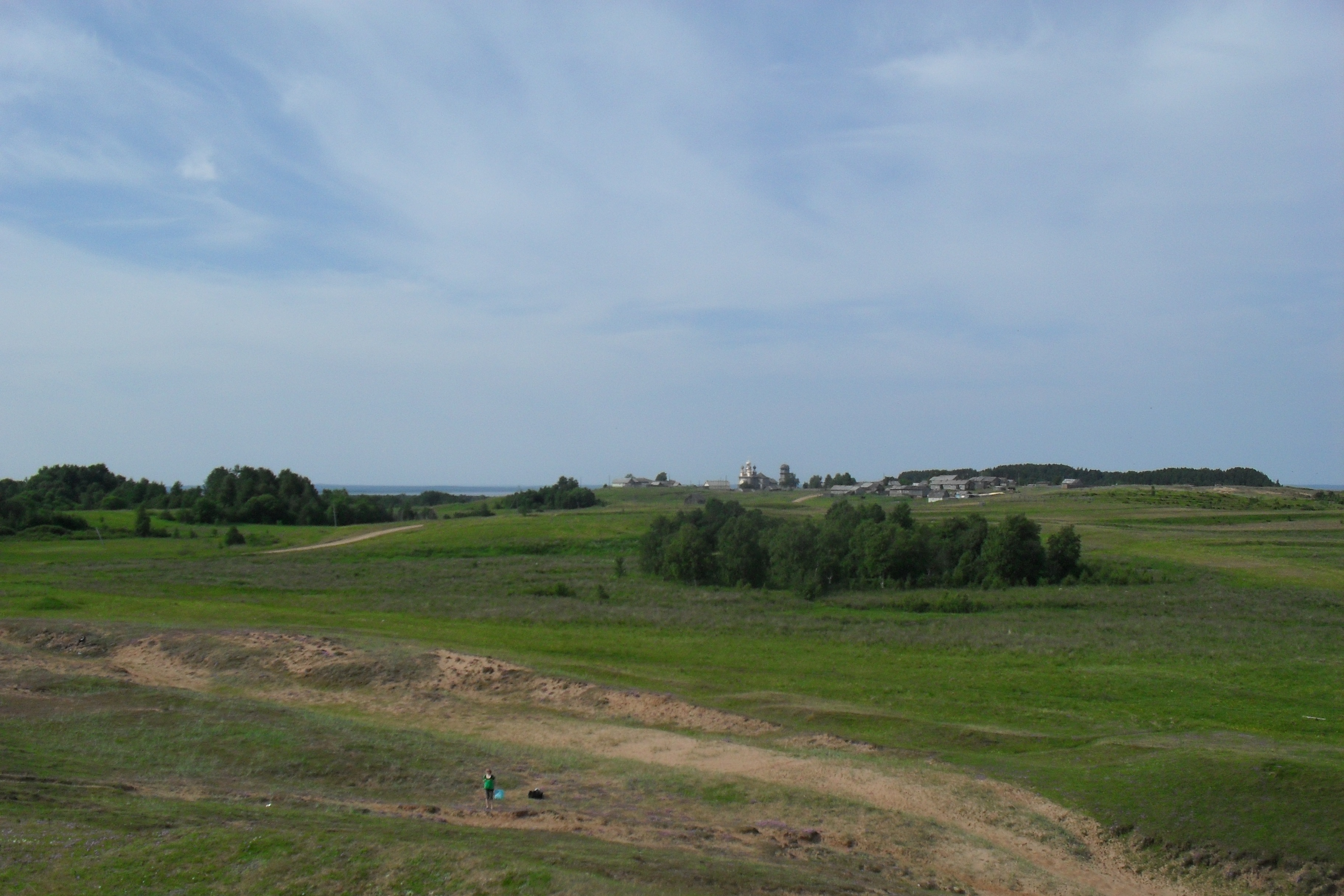
Vorzogory

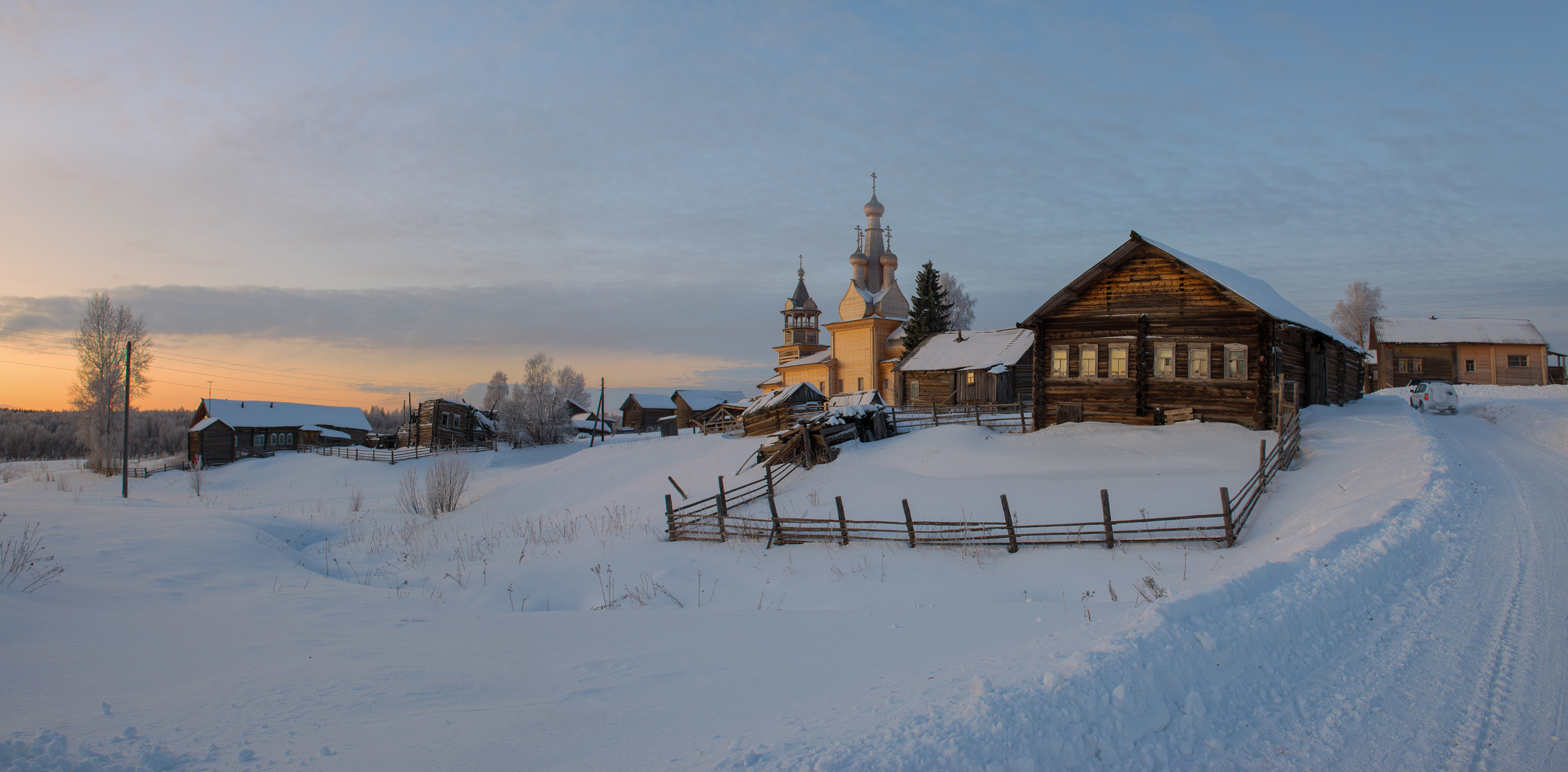
Kimzha

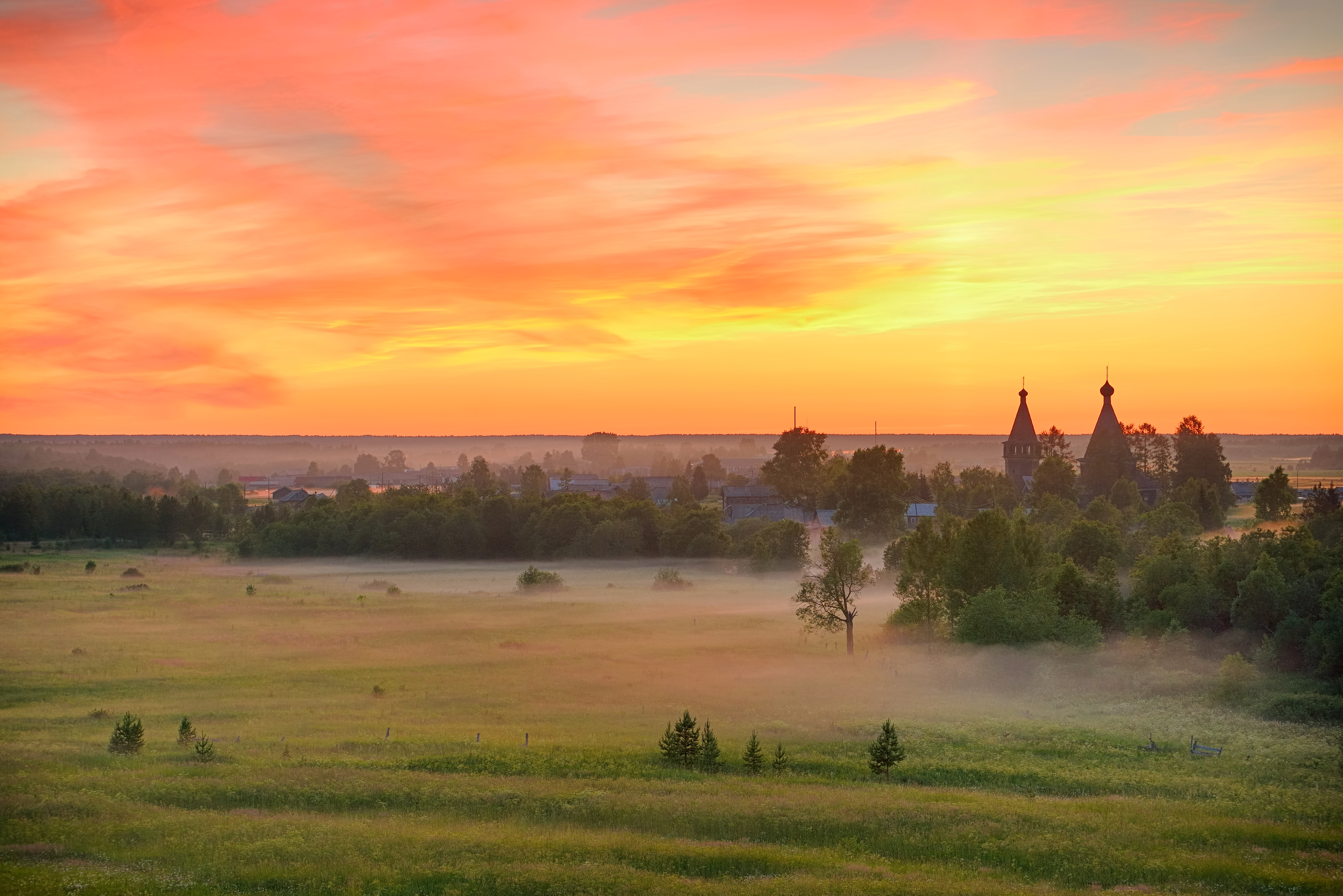
Oshevenskiy Pogost

Buryatia

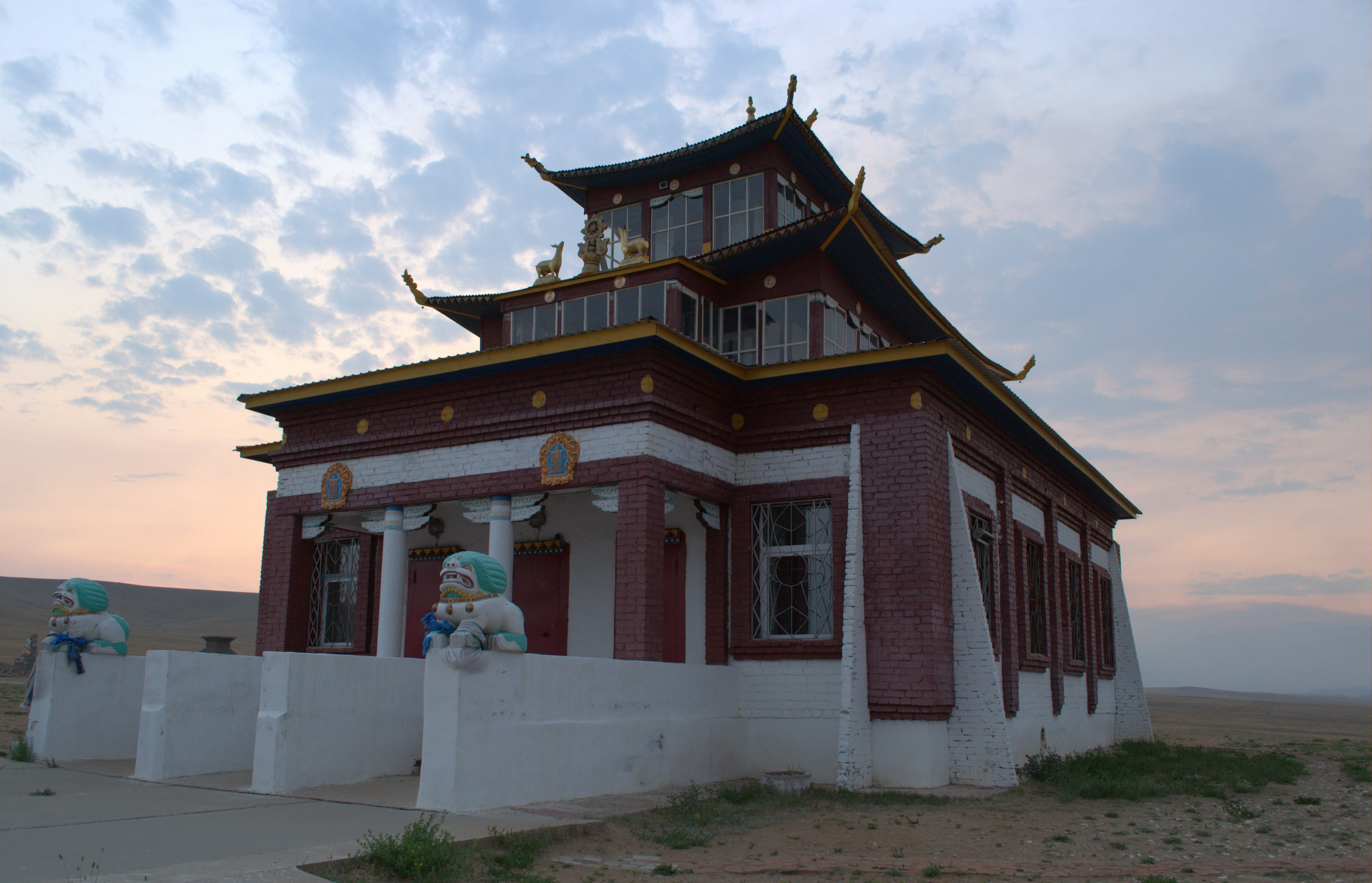
Naryn-Atsagat

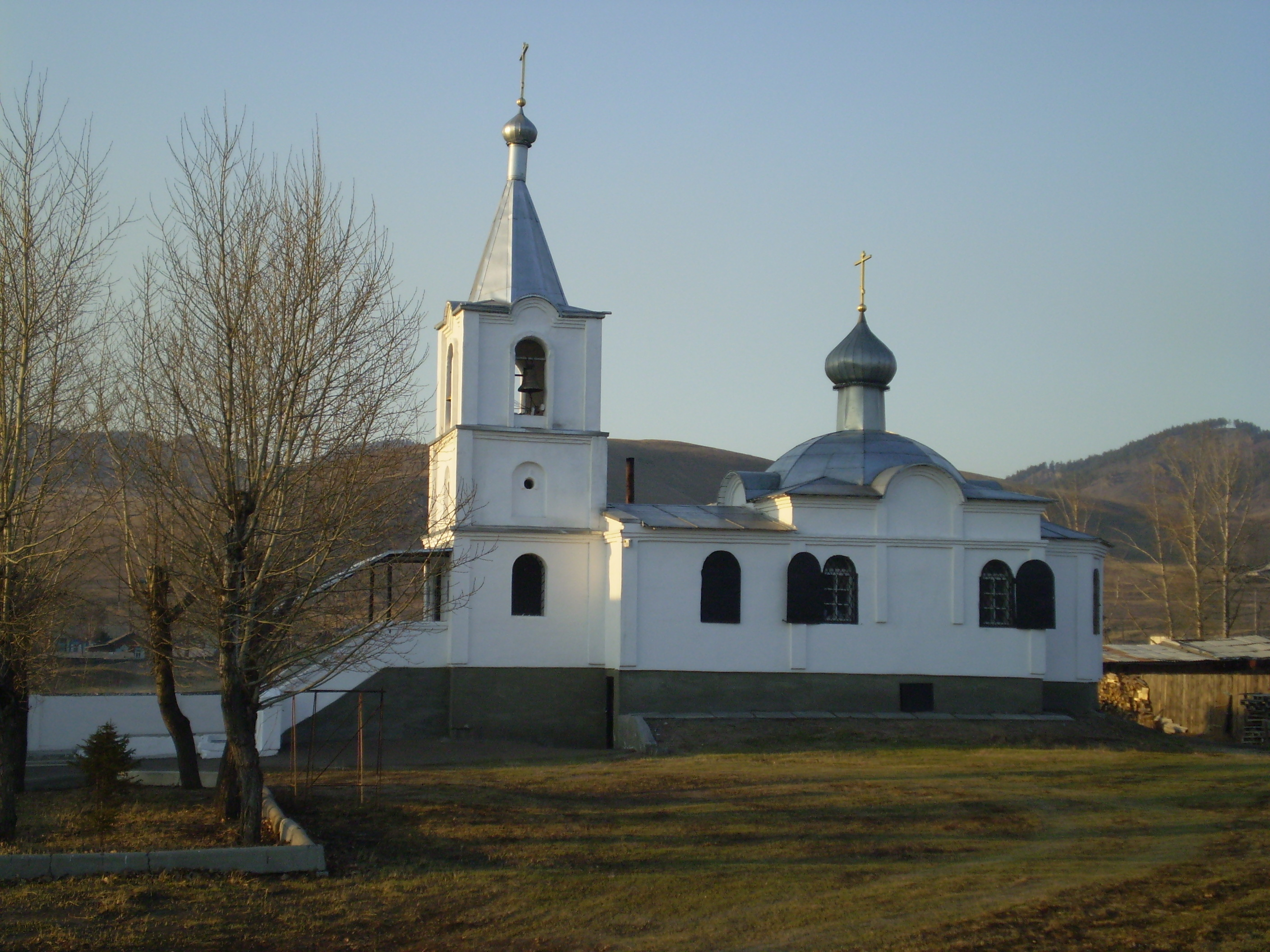
Tarbagatay

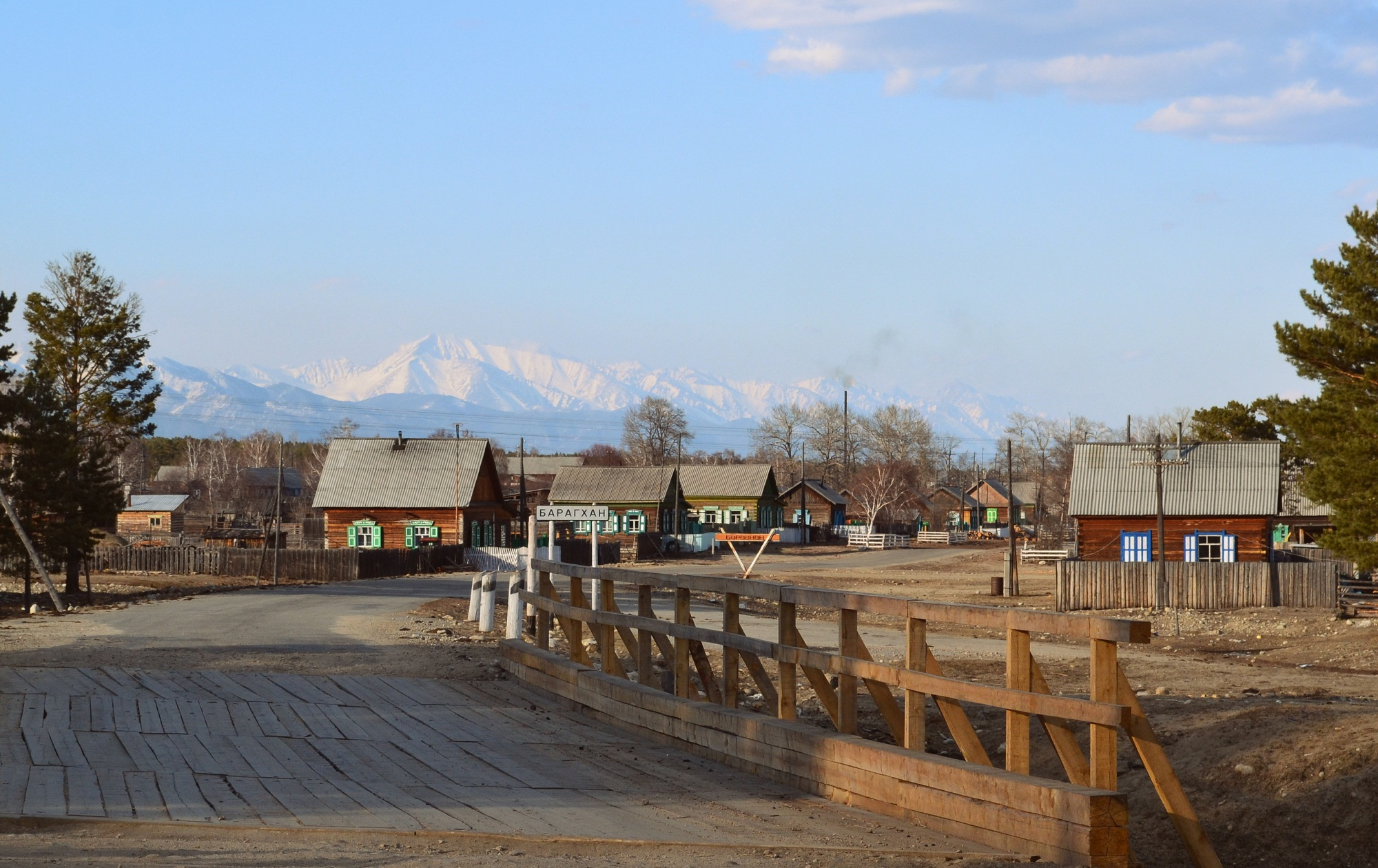
Baragkhan

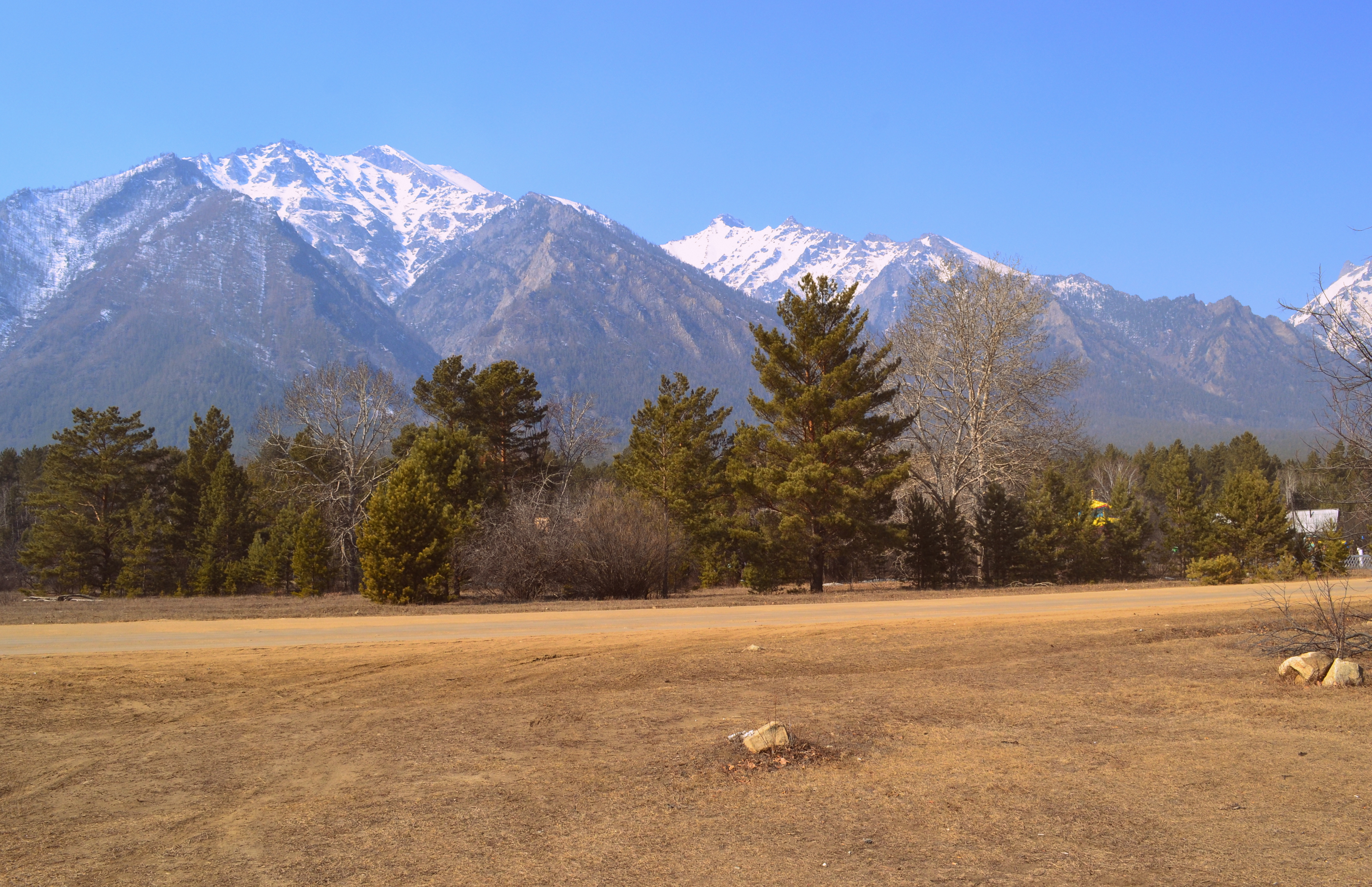
Yarikto

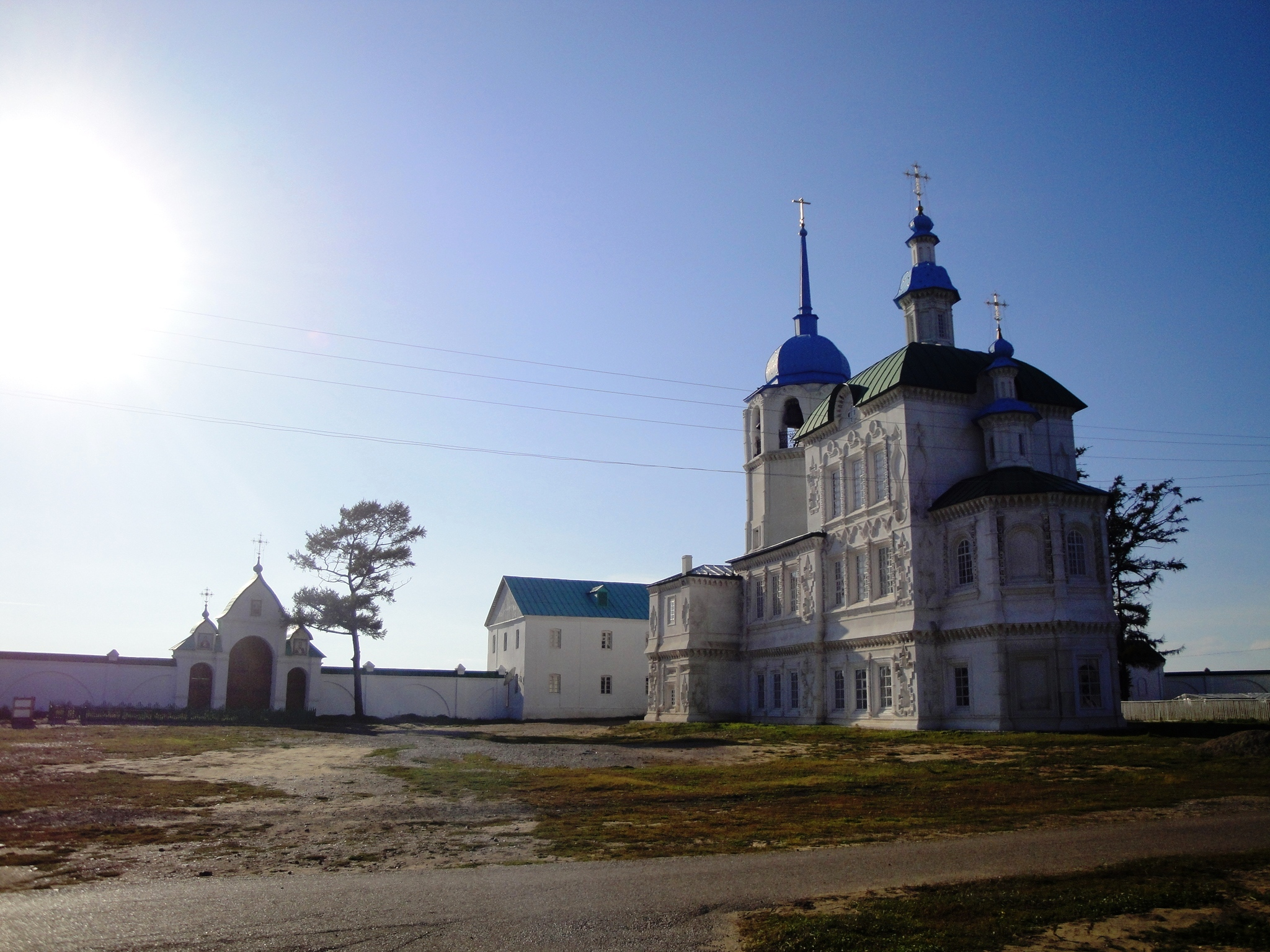
Posolskoye

Karelia

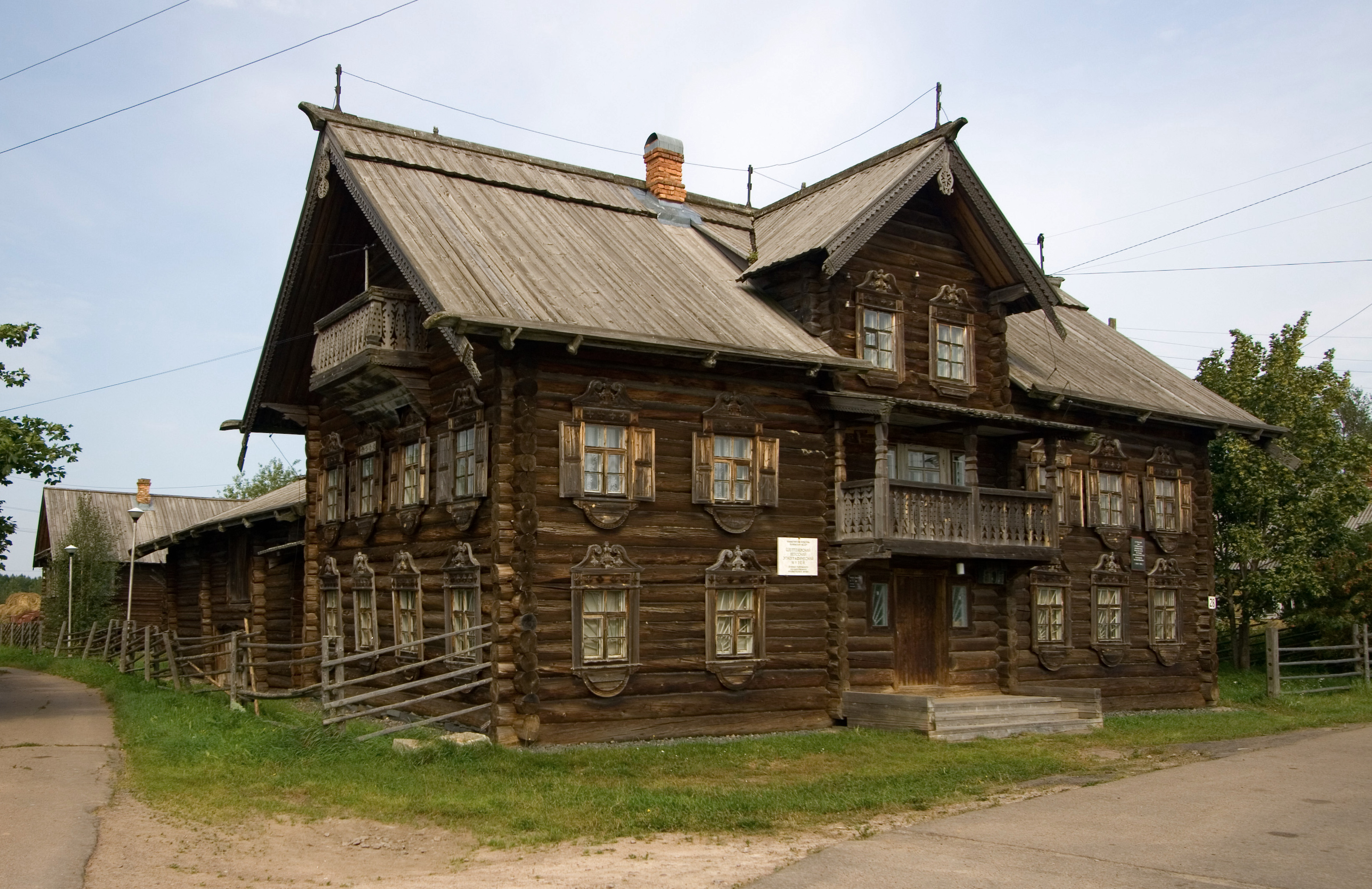
Shyoltozero

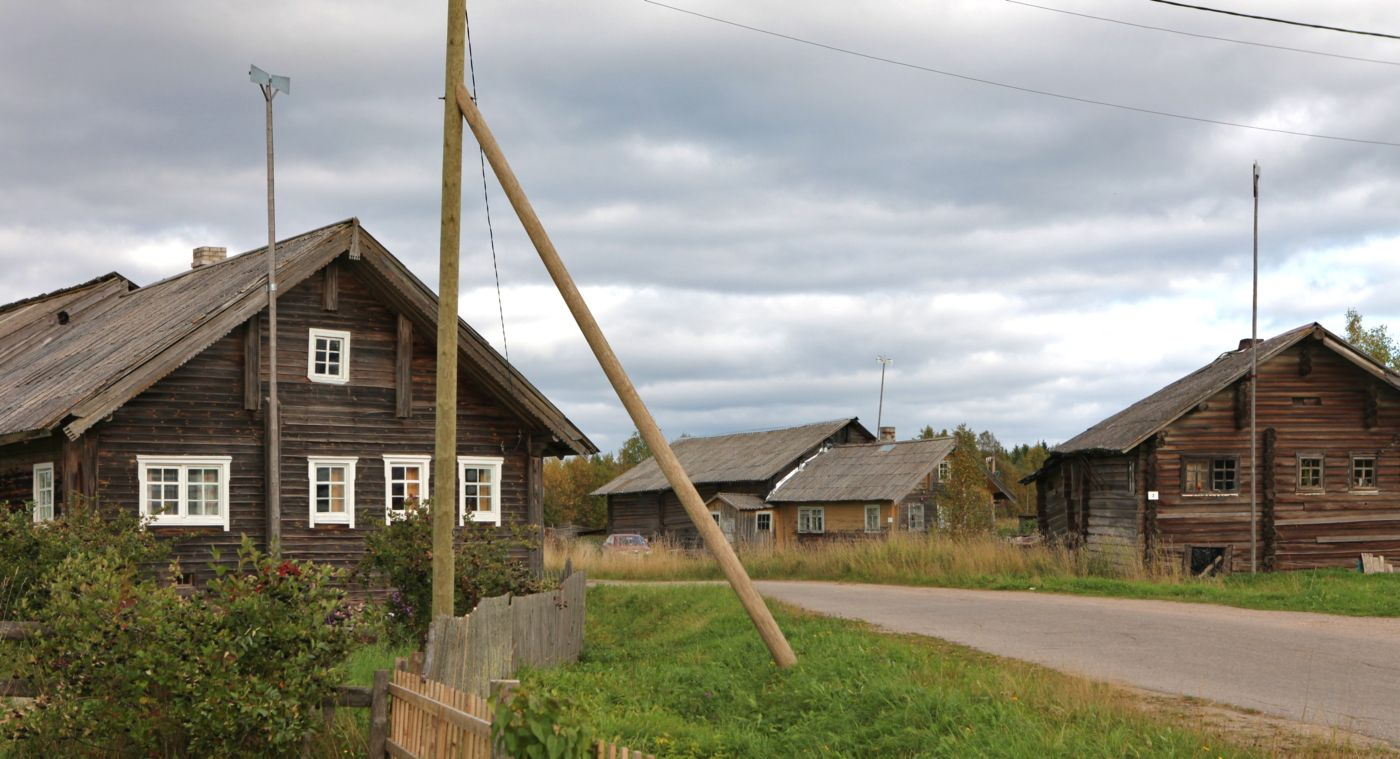
Kinerma

Novgorod Oblast

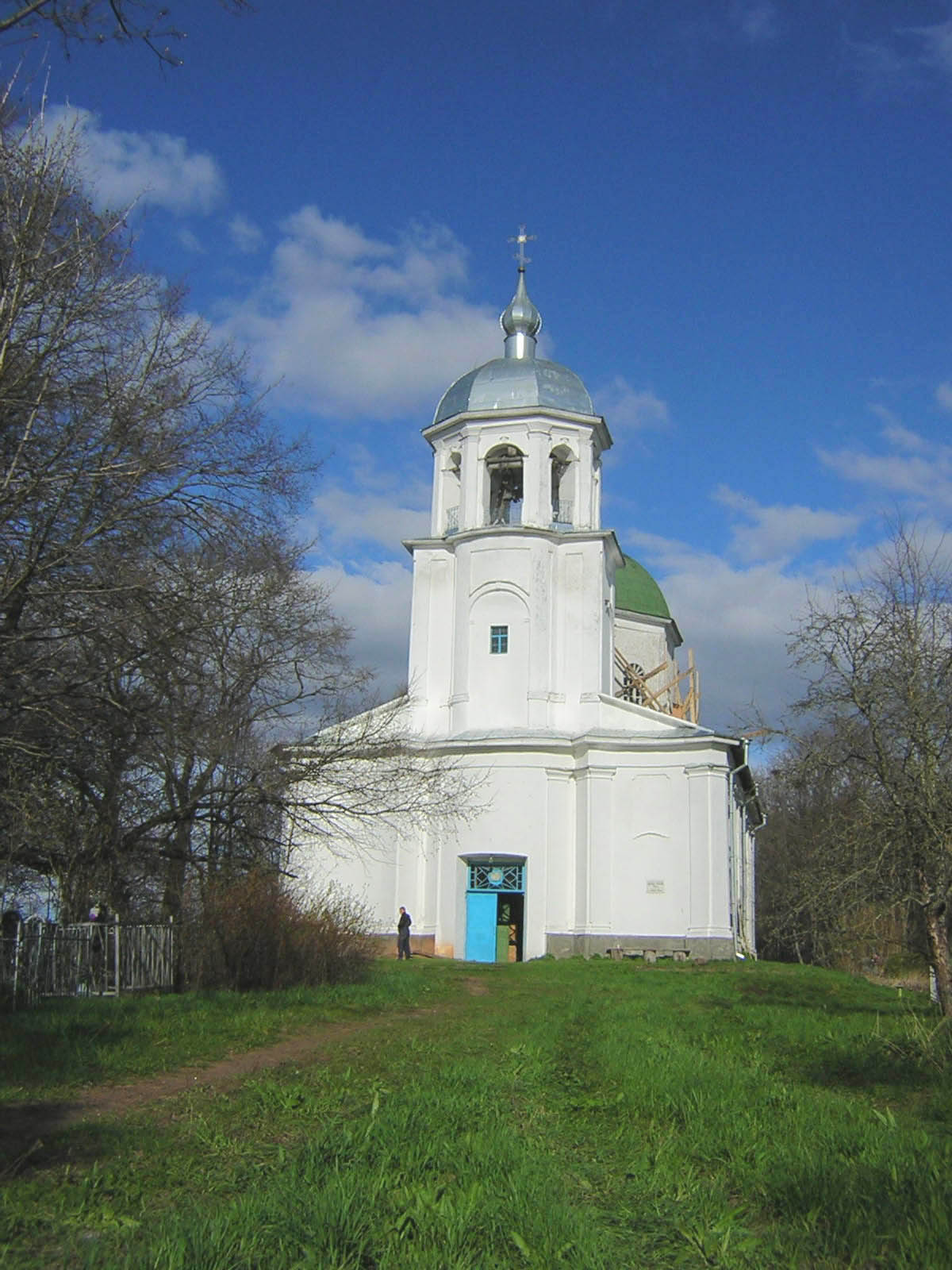
Korostyn

Leningrad Oblast

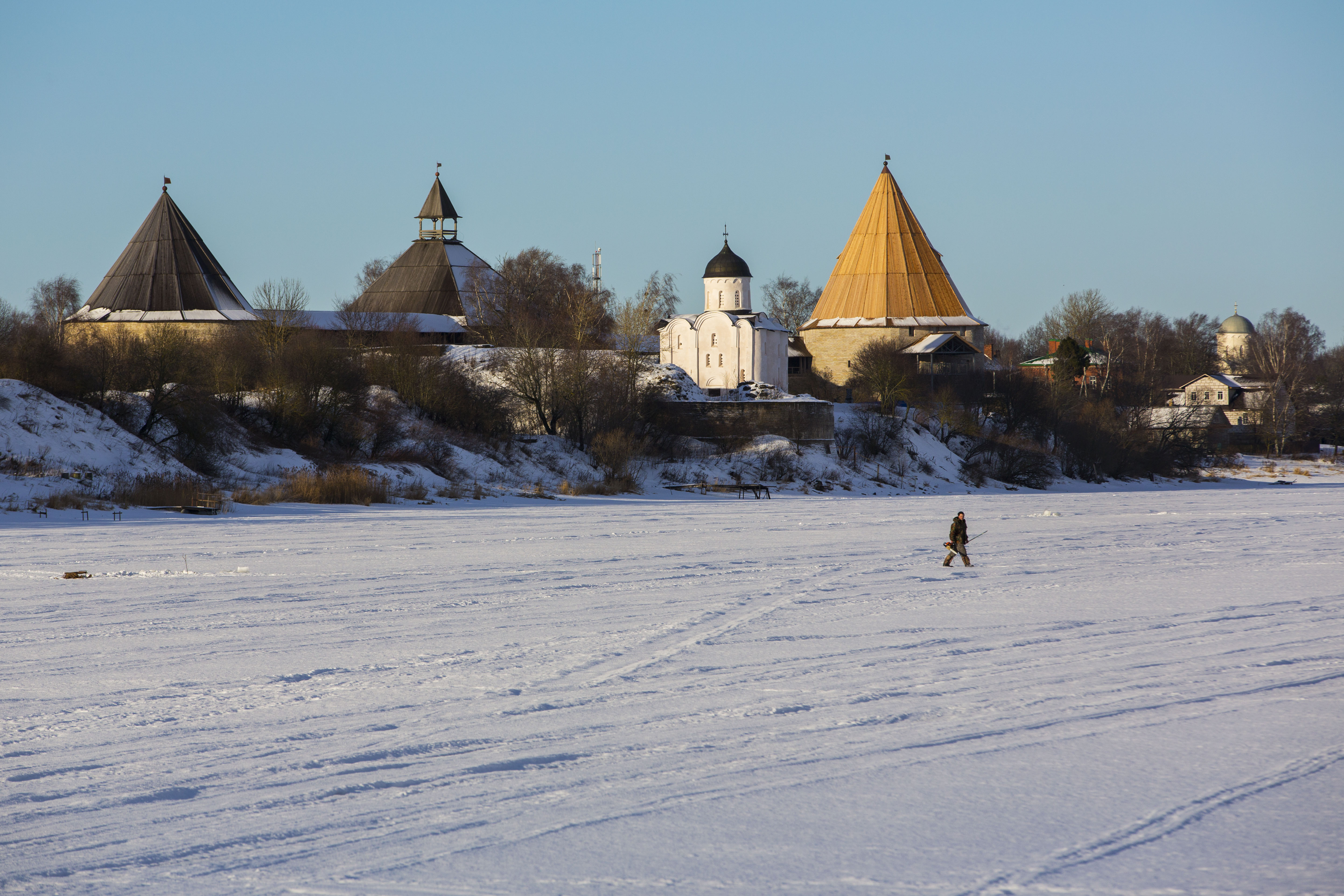
Staraya Ladoga

Pskov Oblast

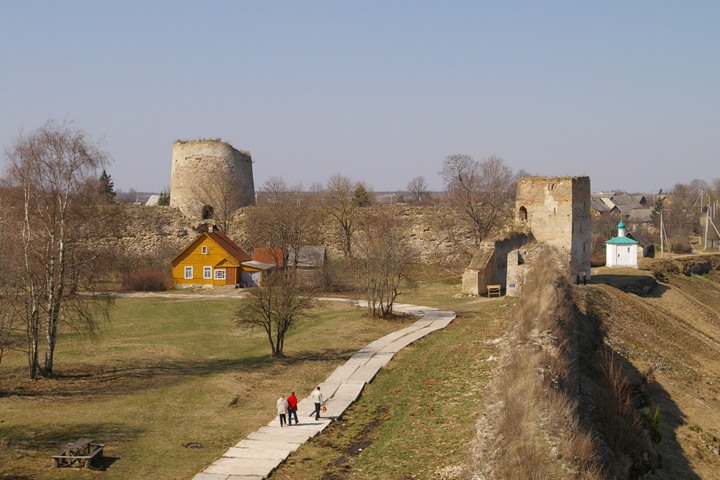
Izborsk

Tver Oblast

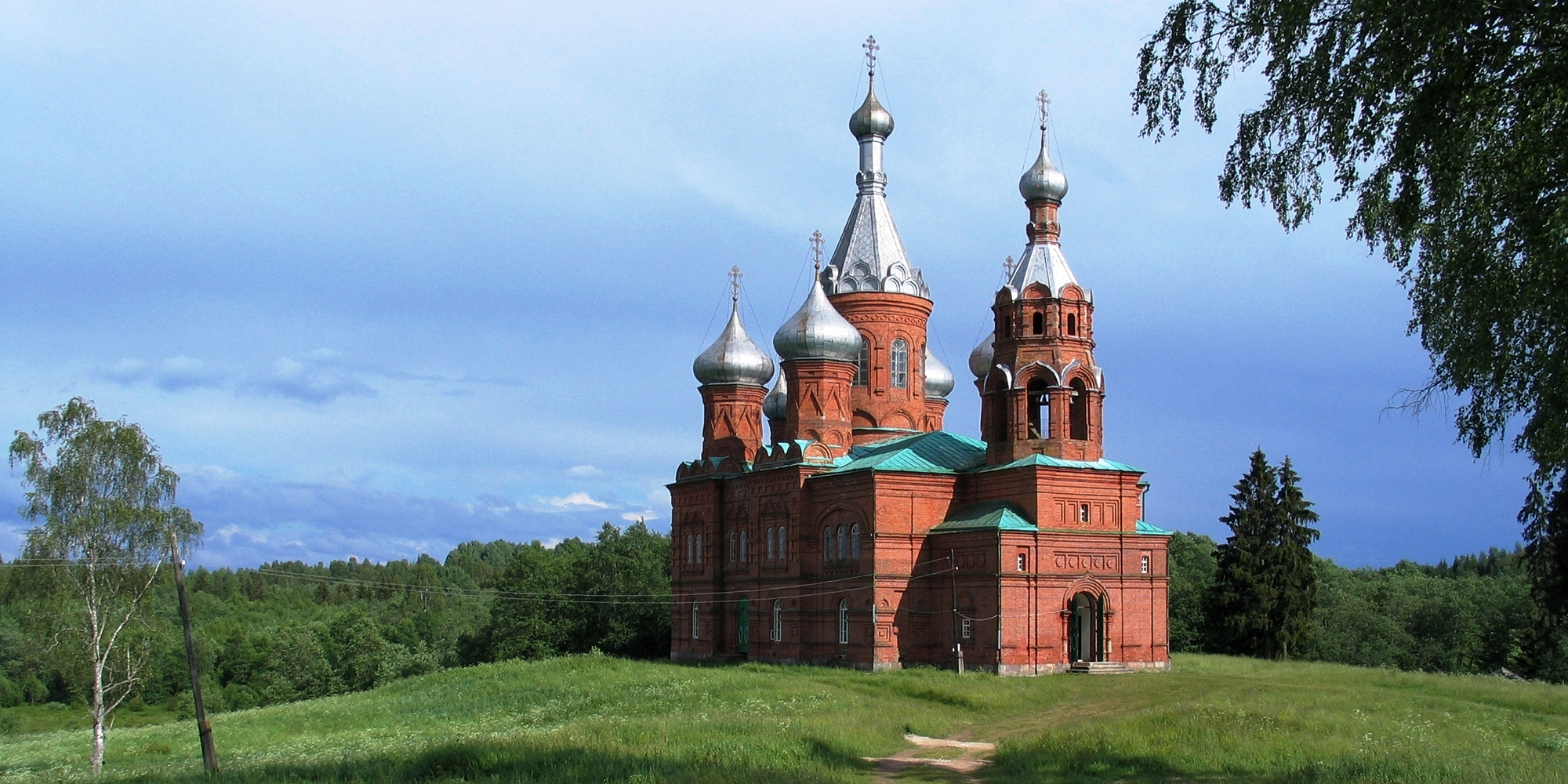
Volgoverkhovye

Vologda Oblast

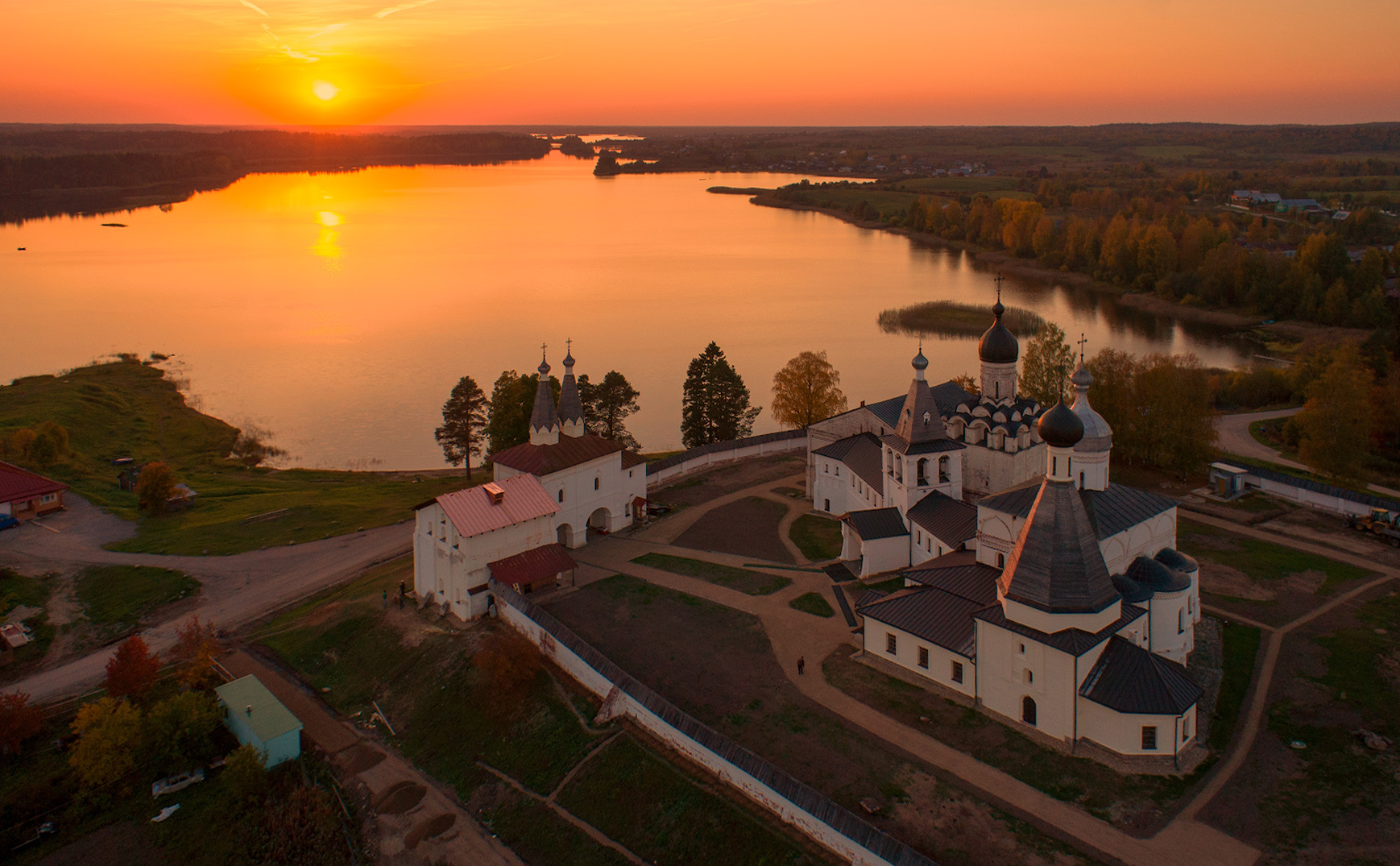
Ferapontovo

Yaroslavl Oblast

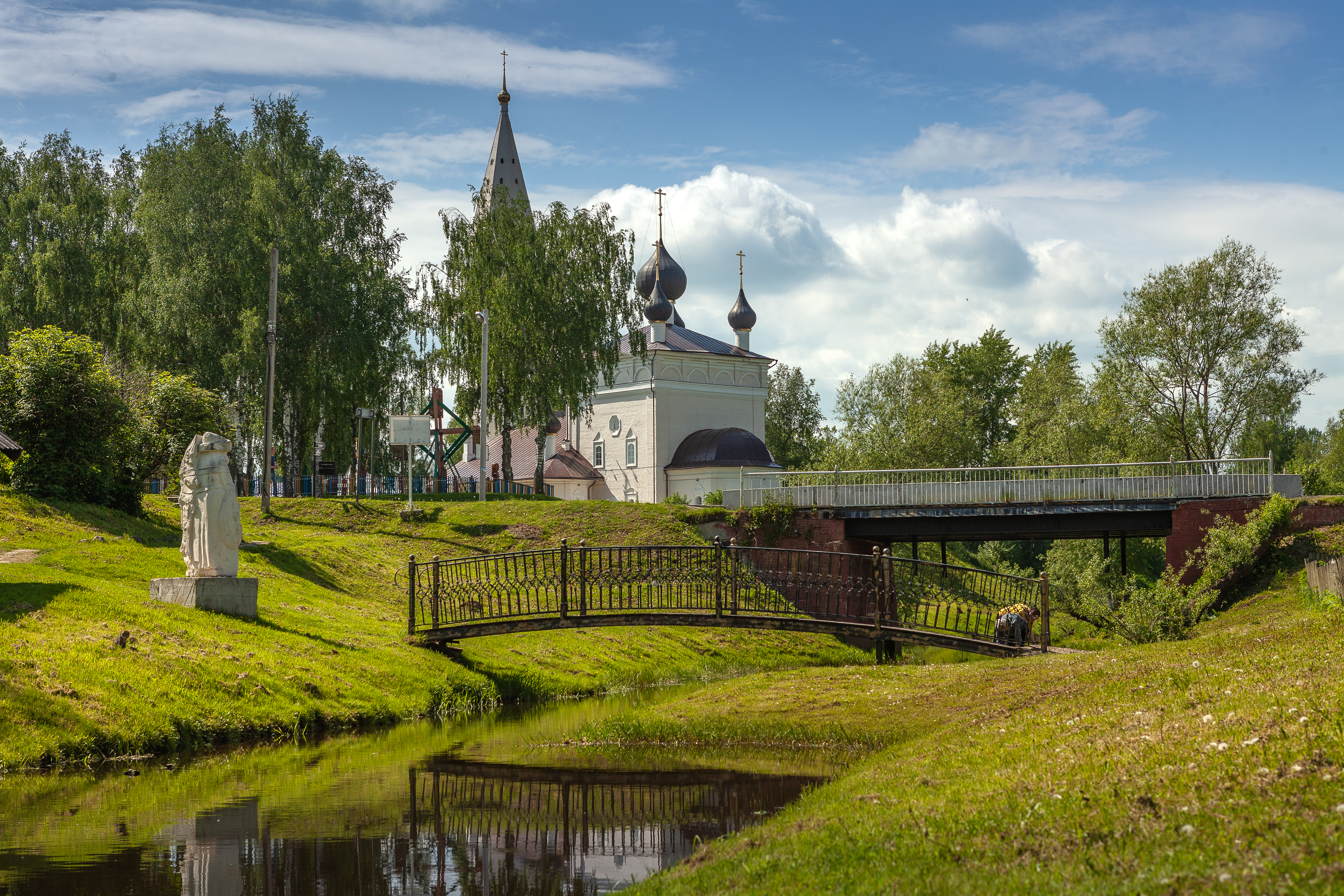
Vyatskoye

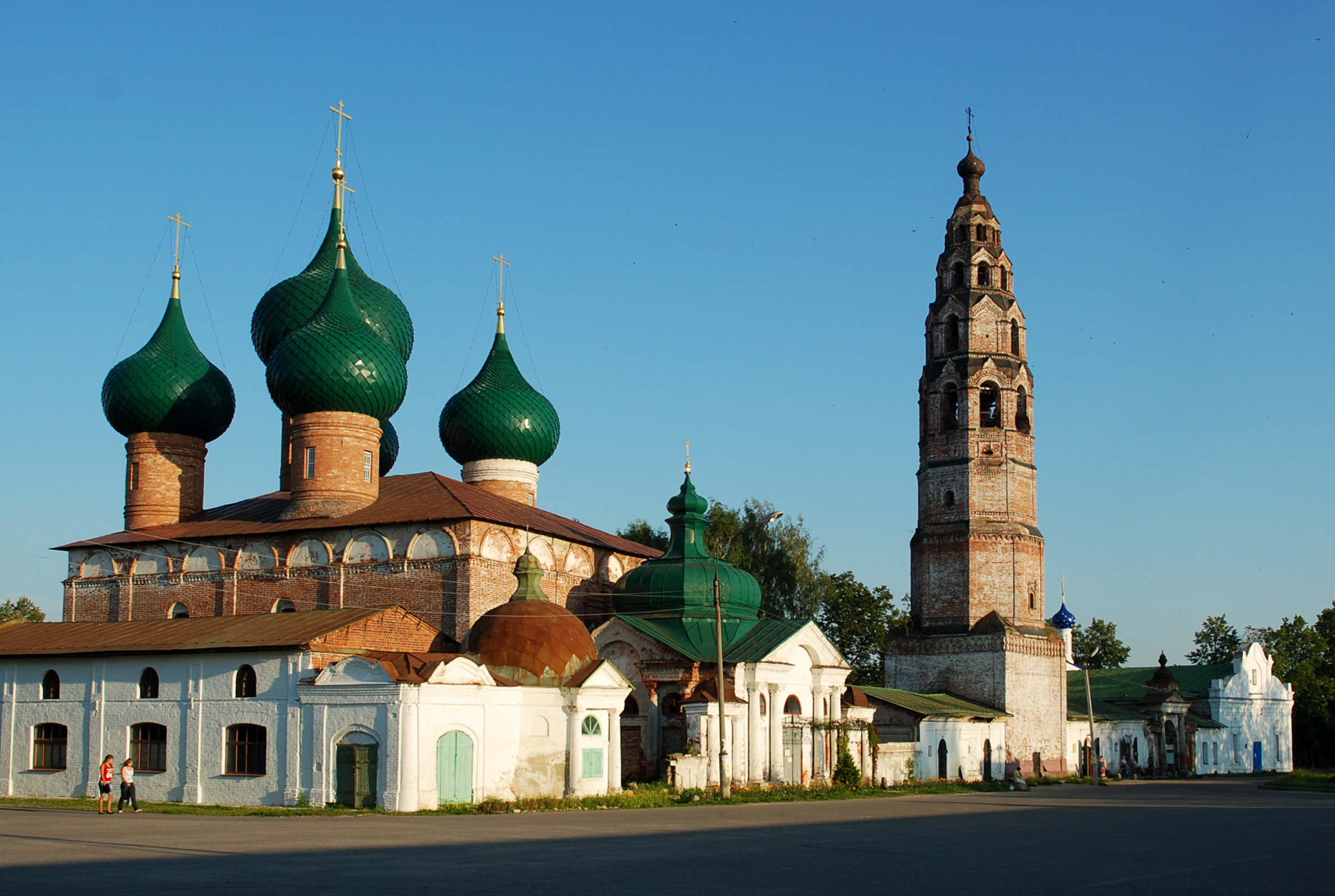
Velikoye
