= Kinerma =

Kinerma Кинерма Kinnermy (Karelian)
- Village
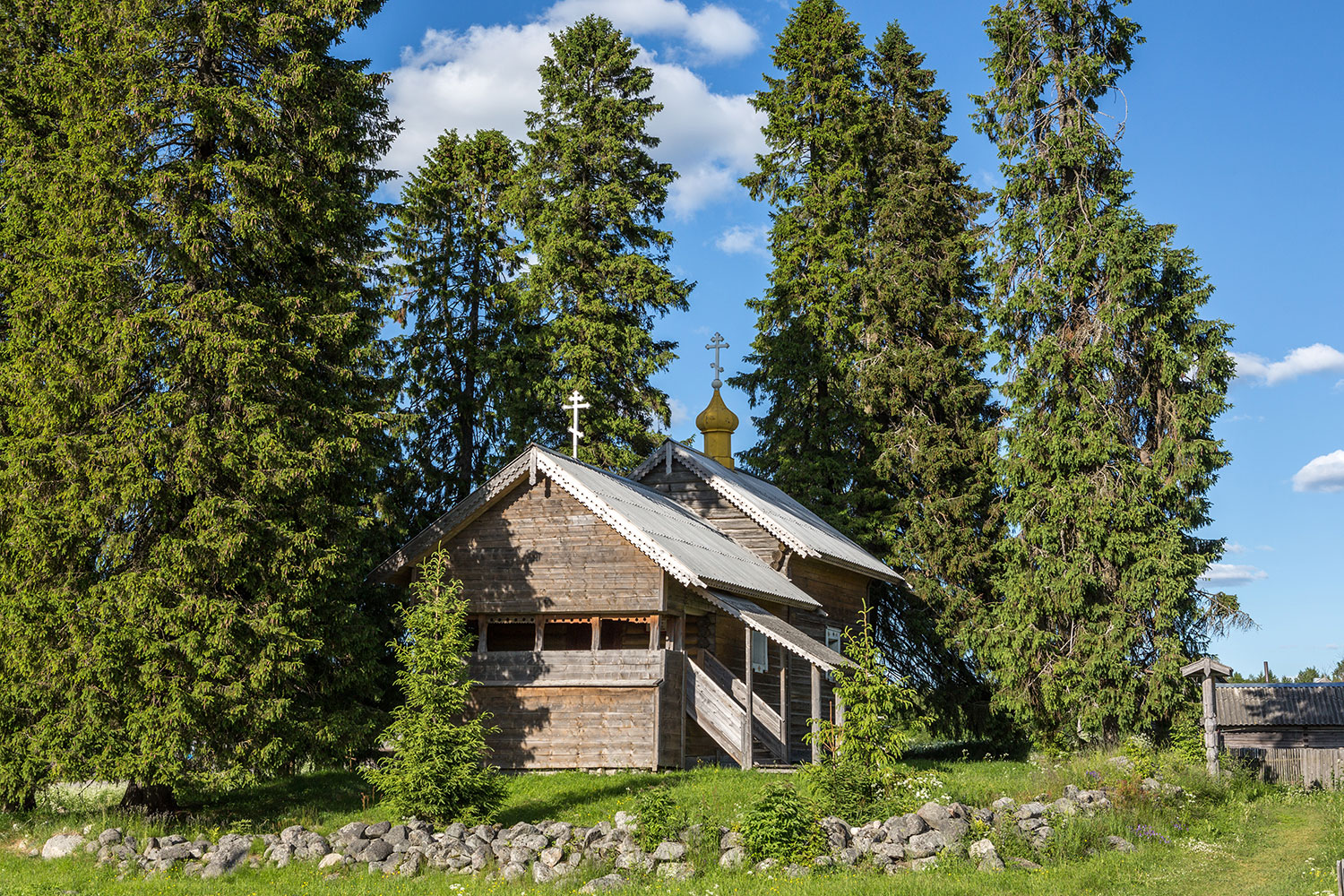
- Chapel of Our Lady of Smolensk
- Interactive map of Kinerma
- Location of Kinerma Kinerma (Karelia)
- Coordinates: 61°31′36″N 32°49′32″E
- Country: Russia
- Federal subject: Republic of Karelia
- Administrative district: Pryazhinsky District

Population (2010 Census)
  - Total: 6
  - Estimate (2021): 15 (+150%)

Municipal status
  - Municipal district: Pryazhinsky Municipal District
  - Rural settlement: Vedlozerskoye Rural Settlement
- Time zone: UTC+3 (UTC+03:00)
- Postal code: 186143
- OKTMO ID: 86639405116

Kinerma (Russian: Кинерма; Karelian: Kinnermy; Finnish: Kinnermäki) is a rural locality (a selo) in Pryazhinsky District of the Republic of Karelia, Russia.

== History ==
The area in which the village is located was settled in the 16th century.

The settlement was first mentioned in the Scribe book of the Obonezhskaya pyatina in 1496.

There are residential houses in the village, the oldest of which were built in the 18th century and the beginning of the 19th century, as well as the chapel of the Smolensk Mother of God, built in the 18th century. Currently, the houses are protected as objects of cultural heritage of the Republic of Karelia.

In 2000 a public fund for the support of the Karelian Cultural Heritage of the Republic of Karelia was established to support the village.

In 2001 the public organization Kinnermäen ystävät (Kinerma's Friends) was established.

In 2016 Kinerma was included in The Most Beautiful Villages in Russia. As a result of winning the competition, there was a large flow of tourists for a tiny village, which six residents cannot cope with: the hostess of the only hotel told reporters: «We want to serve quality for this money, so that people do not leave offended. But 4 thousand tourists a year! We physically can't anymore. I have an appointment for six months ahead.»

== Attractions ==
Among the buildings of the village, the following objects are recognized as architectural monuments:

- Residential house of Kachalova (late 19th century)
- Residential house of Gavrilova (late 19th century)
- Residential house of Davydov (1924)
- Residential house of Kuznetsova (2nd half of the 19th century)
- Residential house of Ershova (2nd half of the 19th century)
- Residential house of Stafeeva (late 19th century)
- Kuznetsova Bath (1902)

== Photo ==
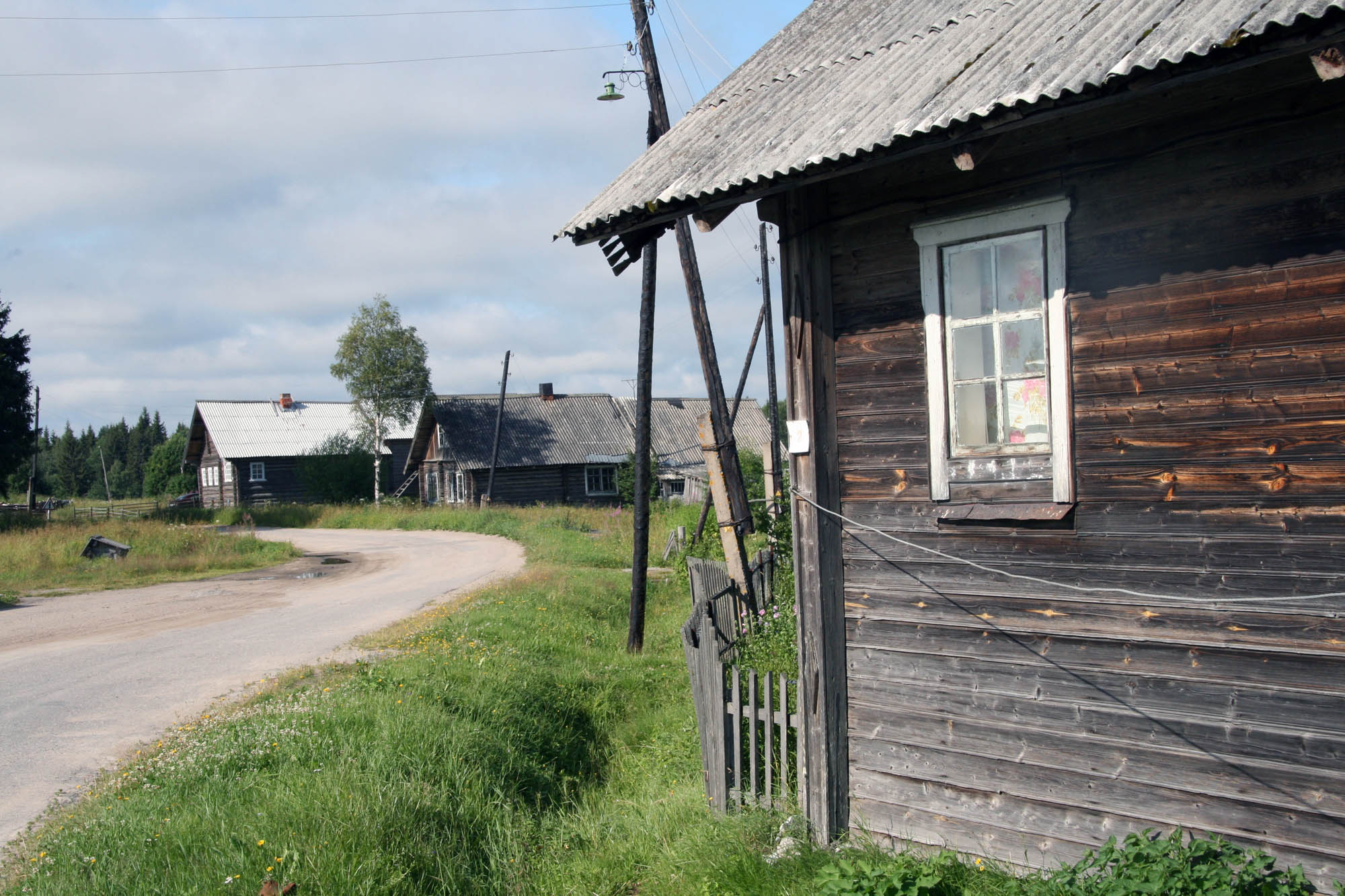

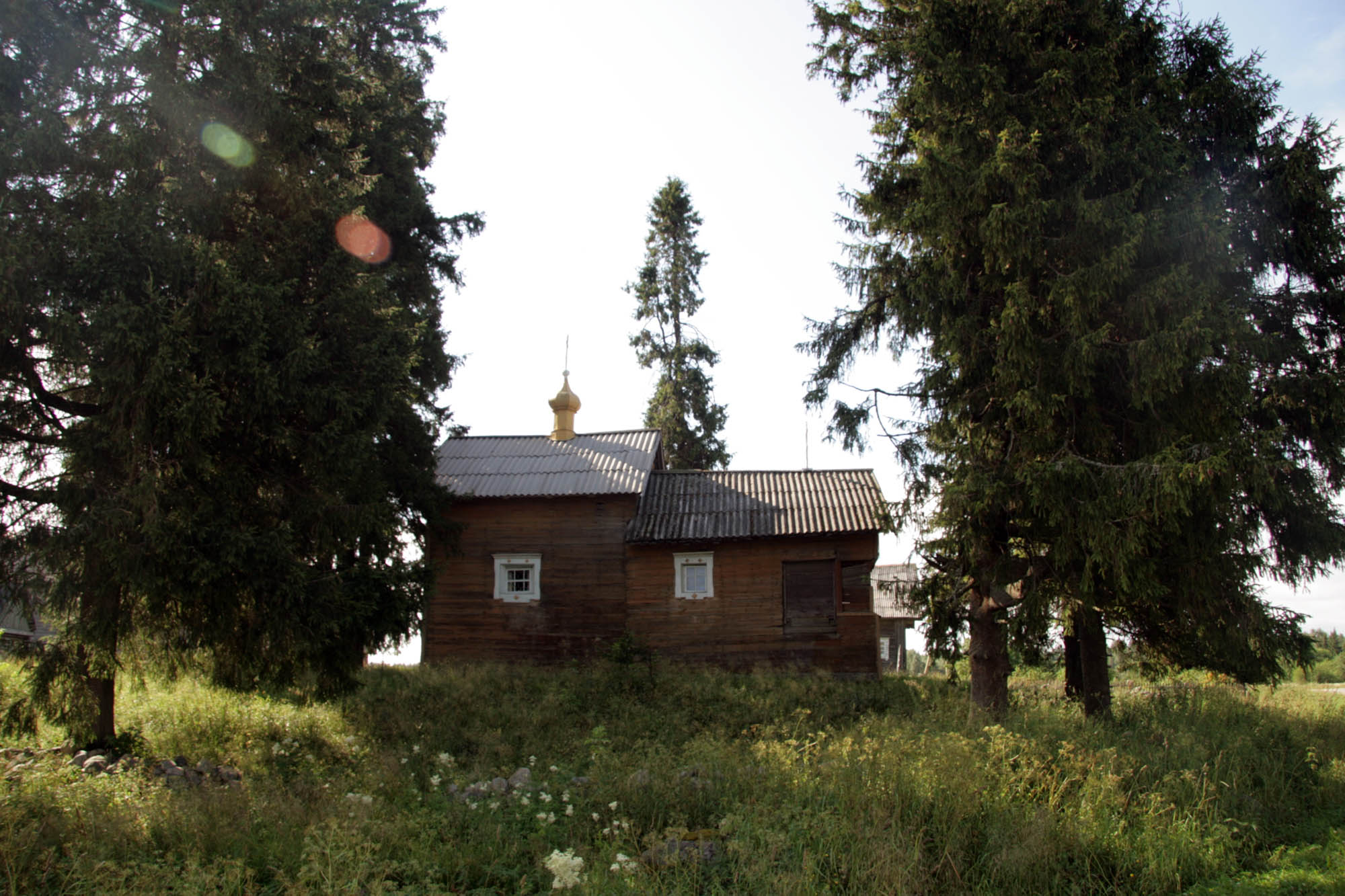

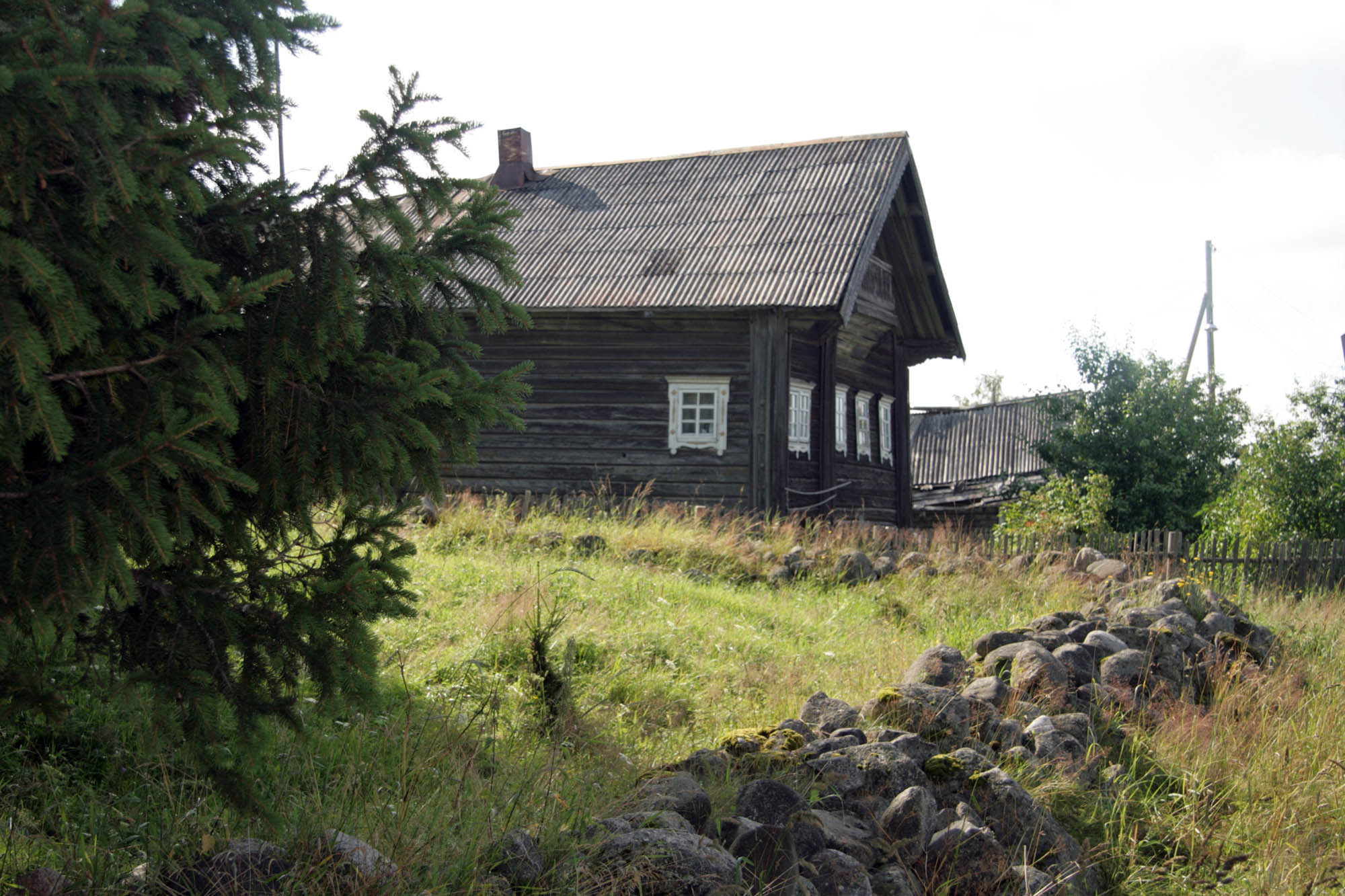

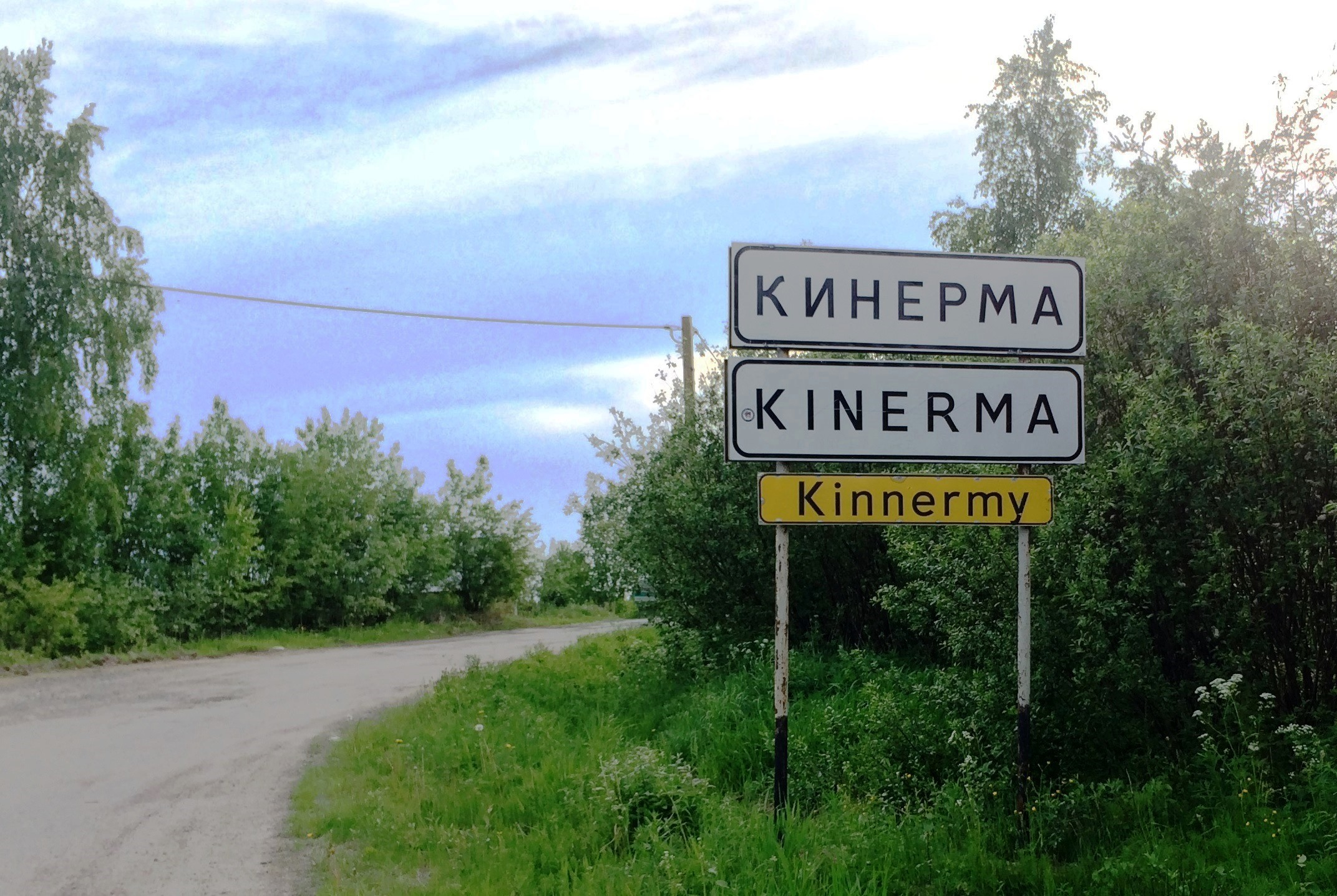
Entrance to the village from Vedlozero

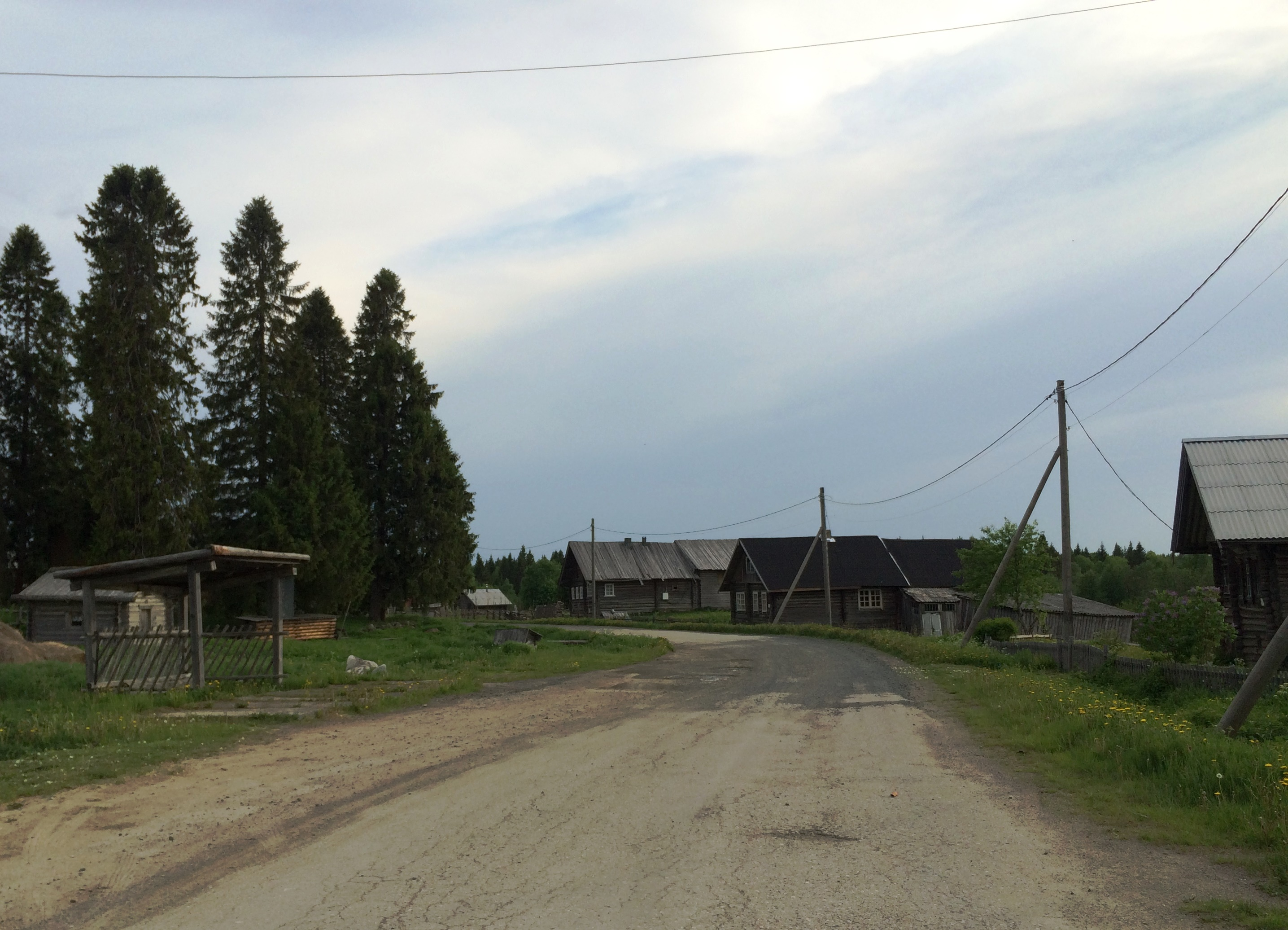
86K-1 road through the village

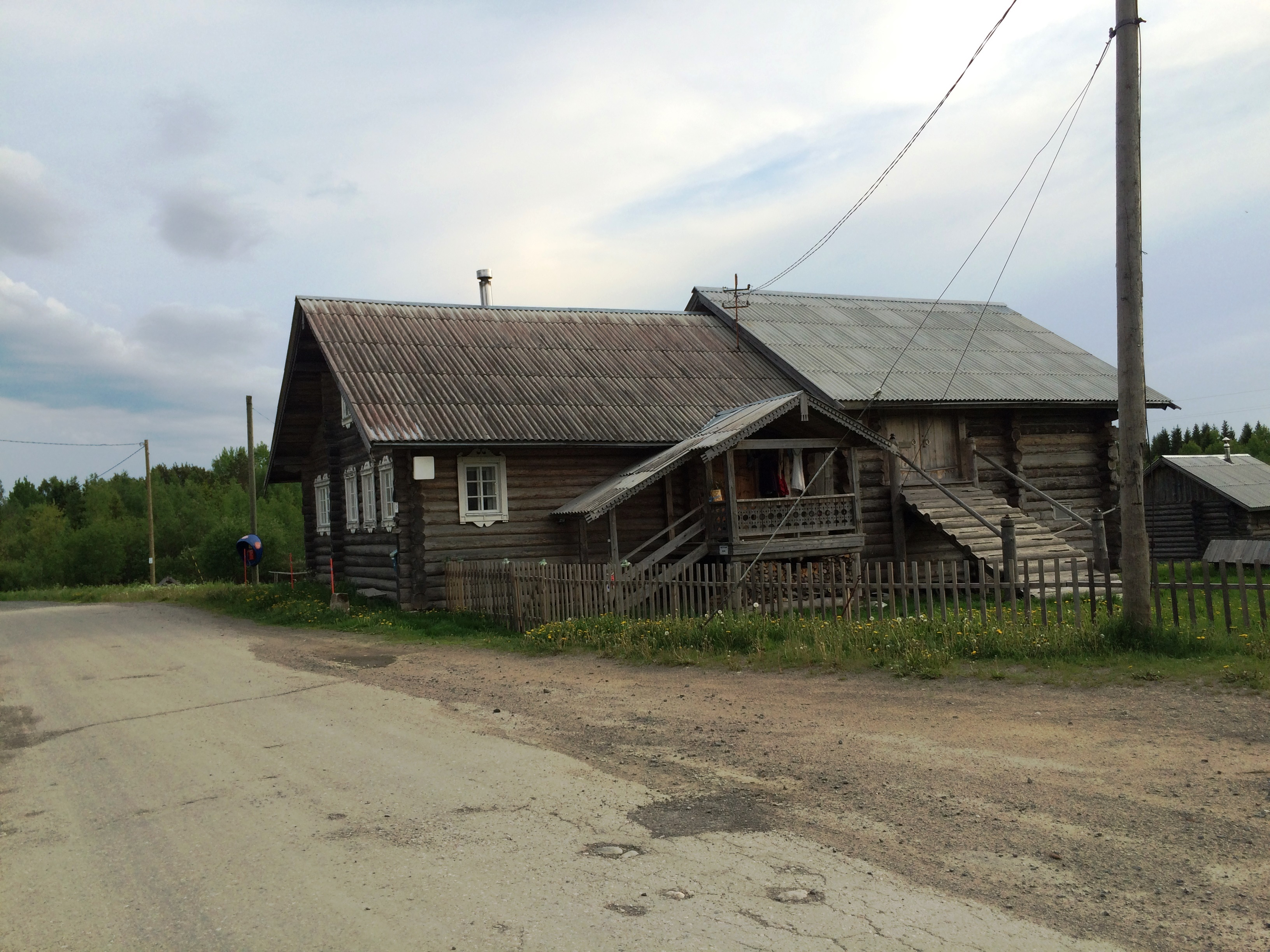
Ethnocultural Center, Kinerma, 17
