= Yarikta =

Yarikta Ярикта
- Ulus
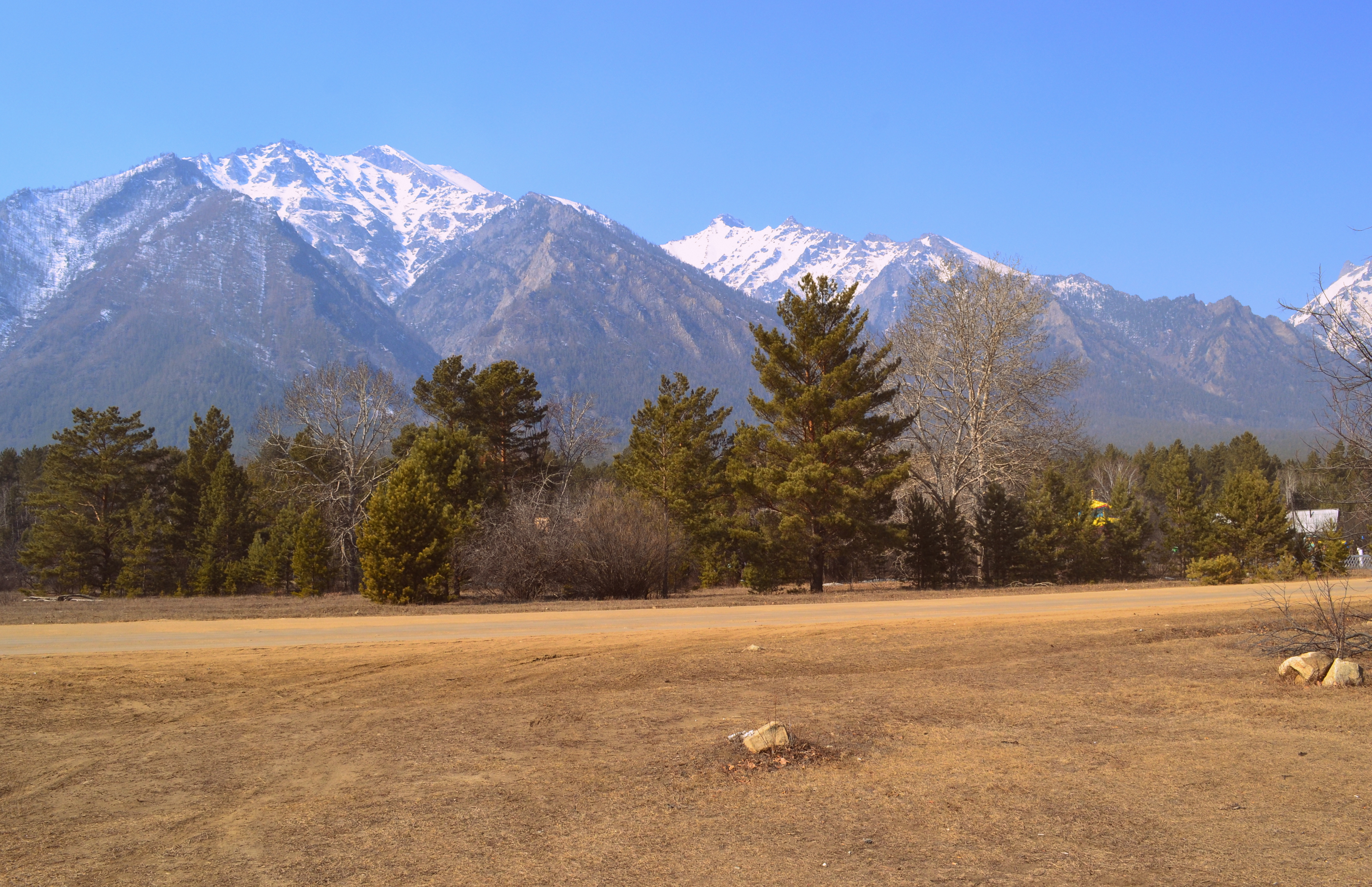
- View of the Barguzin Range from Yarikta

- Location within Republic of Buryatia Location within Russia
- Coordinates: 53°54′N 109°59′E
- Country: Russia
- Region: Republic of Buryatia
- District: Barguzinsky District
- Time zone: UTC+8:00

Yarikta (Russian: Ярикта; Buryat: Яригта, Yarigta) is a rural locality (an ulus) in Barguzinsky District, Republic of Buryatia, Russia. The population was 172 as of 2010. There are 2 streets.

== Geography ==
Yarikta is located at the feet of the Barguzin Range, 43 km northeast of Barguzin (the district's administrative centre) by road. Ulyukchikan is the nearest rural locality.

== See also ==
- The Most Beautiful Villages in Russia
