= Vyatskoye, Astrakhan Oblast =

Vyatskoye Вятское
- Selo
- Interactive map of Vyatskoye
- Location within Astrakhan Oblast Location within Russia
- Coordinates: 46°38′N 48°09′E
- Country: Russia
- Region: Astrakhan Oblast
- District: Krasnoyarsky District
- Time zone: UTC+4:00

Vyatskoye (Russian: Вятское) is a rural locality (a selo) in Dzhanaysky Selsoviet, Krasnoyarsky District, Astrakhan Oblast, Russia. The population was 3 as of 2010. There is 1 street.

== Geography ==
Vyatskoye is located 22 km northwest of Krasny Yar (the district's administrative centre) by road. Verkhny Buzan is the nearest rural locality.
