= Vyatskoye, Yaroslavl Oblast =

Rural locality in Nekrasovsky District, Yaroslavl Oblast, Russia

Coordinates: 57°51′56″N 40°15′50″E

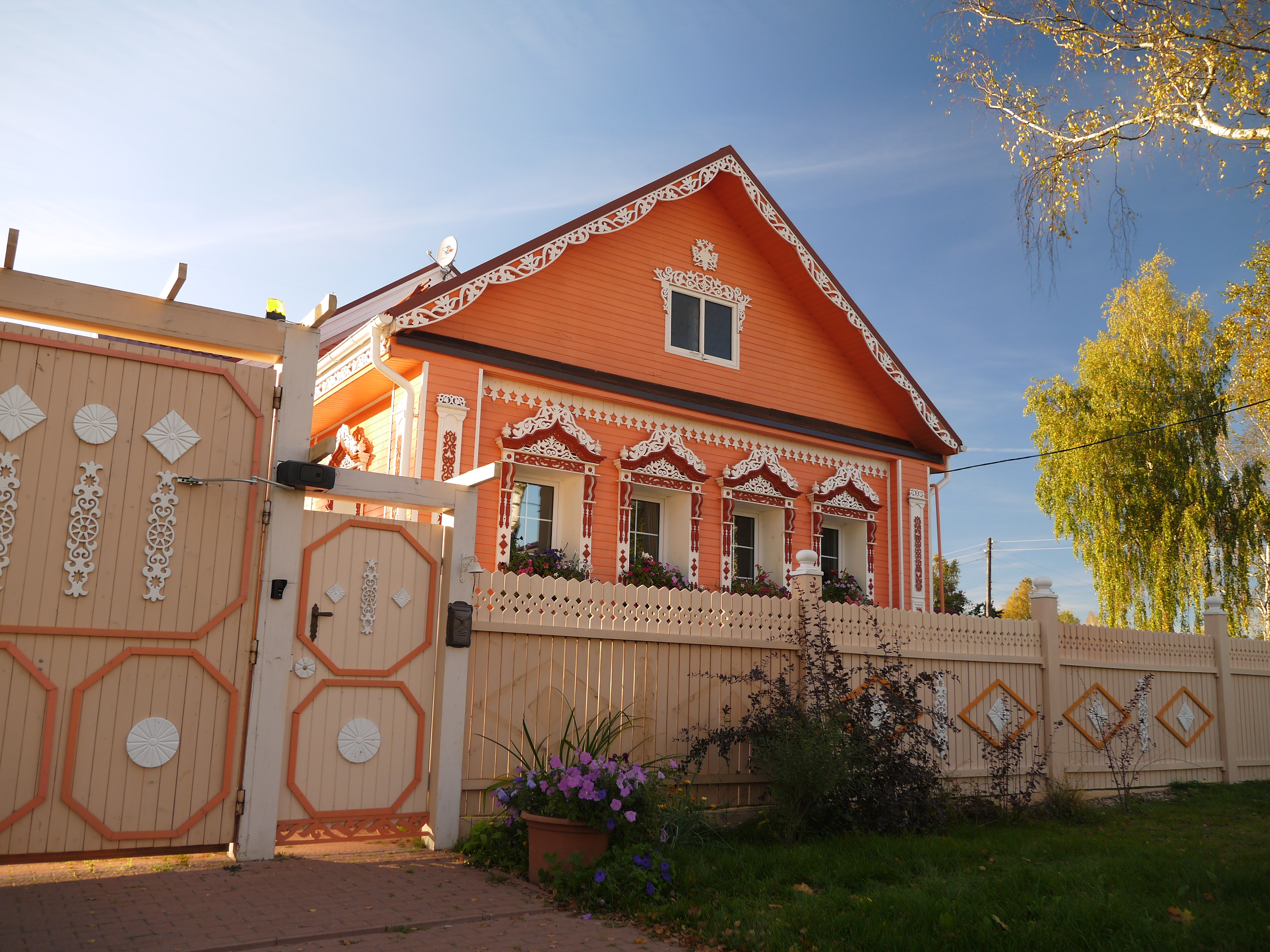
Traditional Russian house in Vyatskoye, Yaroslavl Oblast

Vyatskoye (Russian: Вя́тское) is a village (selo) in the Yaroslavl Oblast of Russia. The village, first mentioned in official record in 1502, was renovated in the early 2000s by businessman Oleg Zharov. The village now hosts 10 museums, and has drawn over 80,000 tourists in 2014.

In 2015, Vyatskoye won the first nationwide competition held by The Most Beautiful Villages in Russia, the Russian equivalent of the Les Plus Beaux Villages de France association.
