= Kositsyna =

Kositsina Косицына
- Village
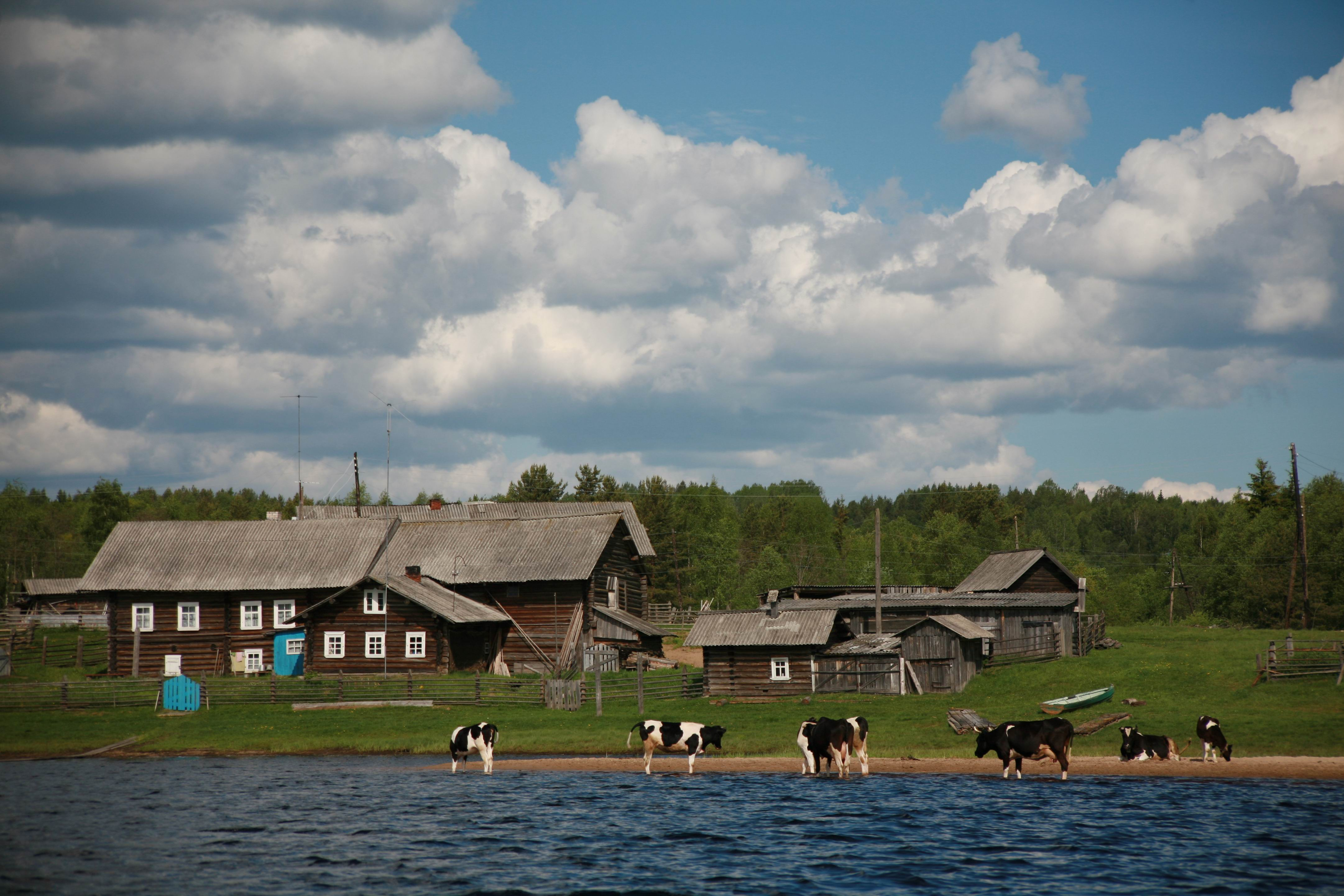

- Location within Arkhangelsk Oblast Location within Russia
- Coordinates: 62°0′7″N 38°10′48″E
- Country: Russia
- Region: Arkhangelsk Oblast
- District: Plesetsky District
- Time zone: UTC+3:00 (CET)

Kositsyna (Russian: Косицына) is a rural locality (a selo) in Plesetsky District of the Arkhangelsk Oblast, Russia. Population: 11 (2010 census); 10 (2002 census);
