= Pezhma =

Pezhma Пежма
- Selo
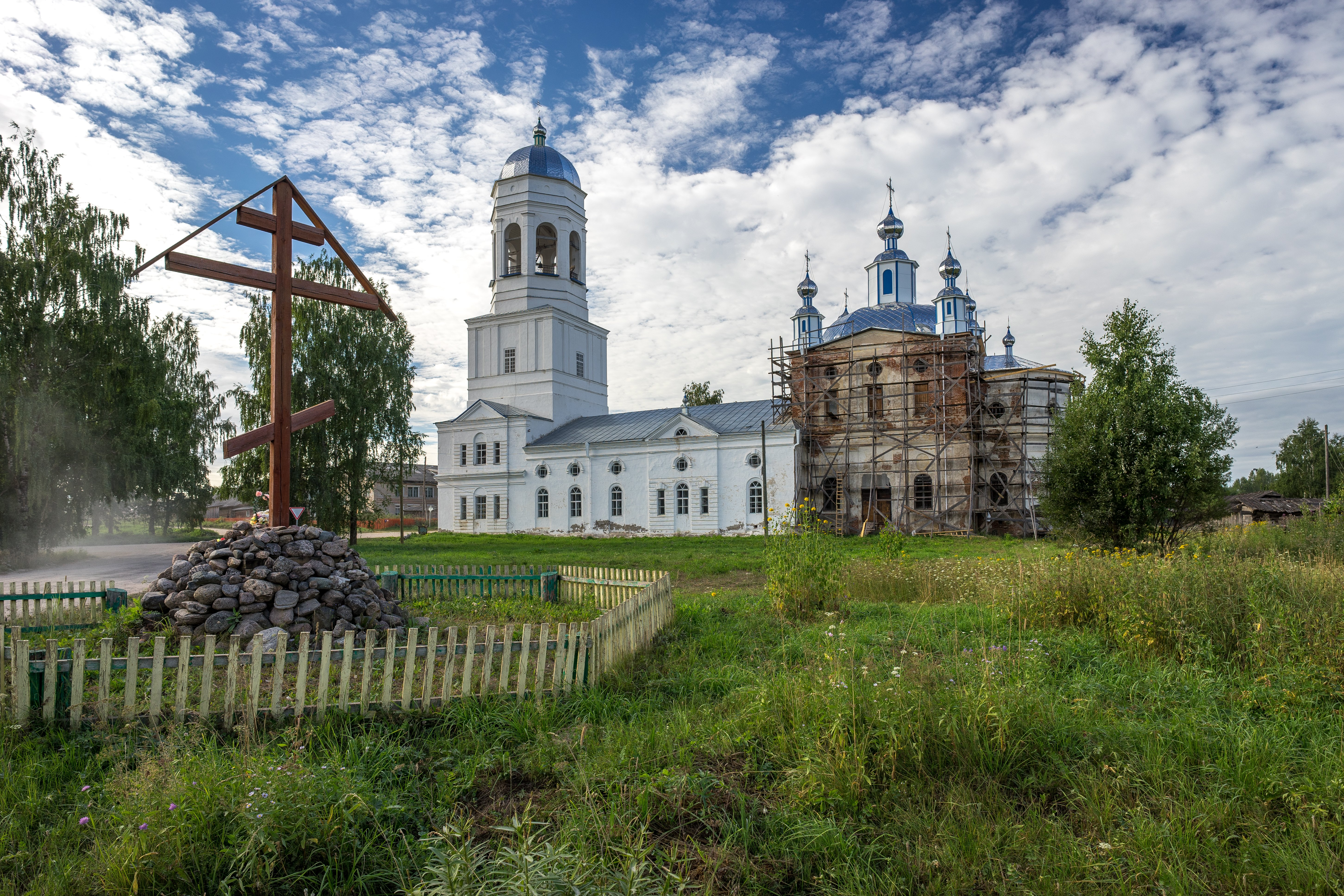

- Location within Arkhangelsk Oblast Location within Russia
- Coordinates: 60°59′N 41°48′E
- Country: Russia
- Region: Arkhangelsk Oblast
- District: Velsky District
- Time zone: UTC+3:00

Pezhma (Russian: Пежма) is a rural locality (a selo) and the administrative center of Pezhemskoye Rural Settlement of Velsky District, Arkhangelsk Oblast, Russia. The population was 585 as of 2014. There are 13 streets.

== Geography ==
Pezhma is located 23 km southwest of Velsk (the district's administrative centre) by road. Krylovo is the nearest rural locality.
