= Administrative divisions of Buryatia =

Subdivisions of the Republic of Buryatia, Russia

Republic of Buryatia Russia
- Administrative centre: Ulan-Ude

Administrative structure (as of 2013)
- Districts: 21
- Cities/towns: 6
- Urban-type settlements: 16
- Selsovets and somons: 238

Municipal structure (as of 2002)
- Rural settlements: 611 (inhabited); 5 (uninhabited)

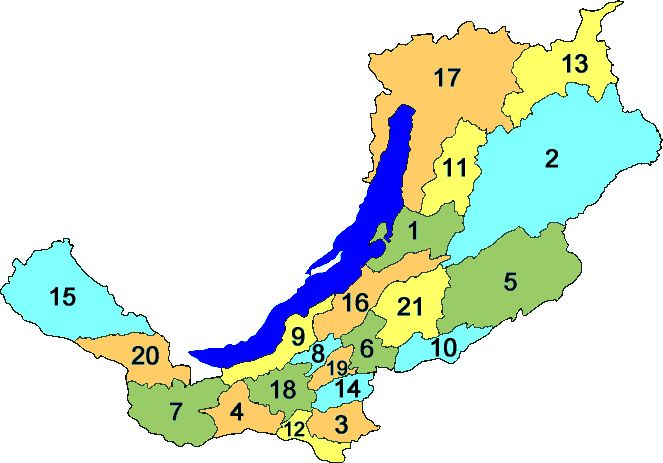
Map of Buryatia (with numbered)

Republic of Buryatia is a federal subject of Russia.

== Administrative and municipal divisions ==
Map

Division		Structure		OKATO	OKTMO	Urban-type settlement/ district-level town*	Rural
Division		Administrative	Municipal	OKATO	OKTMO	Urban-type settlement/ district-level town*	Rural
Ulan-Ude (Улан-Удэ)		city	urban okrug	81 401	81 701		
↳	Oktyabrsky (Октябрьский)	(under Ulan-Ude)	—N/a	81401	—N/a		
↳	Sovetsky (Советский)	(under Ulan-Ude)	—N/a	81401	—N/a	Sokol (Сокол); Zarechny (Заречный)	
↳	Zheleznodorozhny (Железнодорожный)	(under Ulan-Ude)	—N/a	81401	—N/a		
Severobaykalsk (Северобайкальск)		city	urban okrug	81 420	81 720		
Barguzinsky (Баргузинский)		district		81 203	81 603	Ust-Barguzin (Усть-Баргузин)	6 selsovets; 3 somons
Bauntovsky (Баунтовский)		district		81 206	81 606		9 selsovets
Bichursky (Бичурский)		district		81 209	81 609		13 selsovets; 5 somons
Dzhidinsky (Джидинский)		district		81 212	81 612	Dzhida (Джида)	14 selsovets; 8 somons
Yeravninsky (Еравнинский)		district		81 215	81 615		6 selsovets; 8 somons
Zaigrayevsky (Заиграевский)		district		81 218	81 618	Onokhoy (Онохой); Zaigrayevo (Заиграево)	10 selsovets; 1 somon
Zakamensky (Закаменский)		district		81 221	81 621	Zakamensk (Закаменск) town*	4 selsovets; 19 somons
Ivolginsky (Иволгинский)		district		81 222	81 622		4 selsovets; 2 somons
Kabansky (Кабанский)		district		81 224	81 624	Babushkin (Бабушкин) town*; Kamensk (Каменск); Selenginsk (Селенгинск); Tankhoy (Танхой)	11 selsovets; 2 somons
Kizhinginsky (Кижингинский)		district		81 227	81 627		1 selsovet; 8 somons
Kurumkansky (Курумканский)		district		81 230	81 630		5 selsovets; 4 somons
Kyakhtinsky (Кяхтинский)		district		81 233	81 633	Kyakhta (Кяхта) town*; Naushki (Наушки)	8 selsovets; 5 somons
Muysky (Муйский)		district		81 235	81 635	Severomuysk (Северомуйск); Taksimo (Таксимо)	2 selsovets
Mukhorshibirsky (Мухоршибирский)		district		81 236	81 636		13 selsovets; 3 somons
Okinsky (Окинский)		district		81 239	81 639		1 selsovet; 3 somons
Pribaykalsky (Прибайкальский)		district		81 242	81 642		9 selsovets
Severo-Baykalsky (Северо-Байкальский)		district		81 245	81 645	Kichera (Кичера); Nizhneangarsk (Нижнеангарск); Novy Uoyan (Новый Уоян); Yanchukan (Янчукан)	6 selsovets
Selenginsky (Селенгинский)		district		81 248	81 648	Gusinoozyorsk (Гусиноозёрск) town*	4 selsovets; 9 somons
Tarbagataysky (Тарбагатайский)		district		81 250	81 650		10 selsovets
Tunkinsky (Тункинский)		district		81 251	81 651		5 selsovets; 7 somons
Khorinsky (Хоринский)		district		81 257	81 657		7 selsovets; 3 somons

== Note on the types of the inhabited localities ==
In the Republic of Buryatia, ulus is a type of rural locality, along with "selo" and "settlement".
