= Krasnoyarovo =

Krasnoyarovo can refer to:

- Krasnoyarovo, Amur Oblast
- Krasnoyarovo, Ilishevsky District, Republic of Bashkortostan
- Krasnoyarovo, Karmaskalinsky District, Republic of Bashkortostan
- Krasnoyarovo, Republic of Buryatia
