= Kumora =

Kumora Кумора
- Settlement
- Location within Republic of Buryatia Location within Russia
- Coordinates: 55°53′N 111°12′E
- Country: Russia
- Region: Republic of Buryatia
- District: Severo-Baykalsky District
- Time zone: UTC+8:00

Kumora (Russian: Кумора) is a rural locality (a settlement) in Severo-Baykalsky District, Republic of Buryatia, Russia. The population was 565 as of 2010. There are 21 streets.

== Geography ==
Kumora is located 230 km east of Nizhneangarsk (the district's administrative centre) by road. Novy Uoyan is the nearest rural locality.
