= Klyuchi, Republic of Buryatia =

Klyuchi Ключи
- Selo
- Location within Republic of Buryatia Location within Russia
- Coordinates: 51°41′N 107°10′E
- Country: Russia
- Region: Republic of Buryatia
- District: Ivolginsky District
- Time zone: UTC+8:00

Klyuchi (Russian: Ключи) is a rural locality (a selo) in Ivolginsky District, Republic of Buryatia, Russia. As of 2010, the population was 103. There are 2 streets.

== Geography ==
Klyuchi is located 10 km southwest of Ivolginsk (the district's administrative centre) by road. Ivolginsk is the nearest rural locality.
