= Khoytobeye =

Khoytobeye Хойтобэе
- Ulus
- Location within Republic of Buryatia Location within Russia
- Coordinates: 51°47′N 107°25′E
- Country: Russia
- Region: Republic of Buryatia
- District: Ivolginsky District
- Time zone: UTC+8:00

Khoytobeye (Russian: Хойтобэе; Buryat: Хойто Бэе, Khoito Beye) is a rural locality (an ulus) in Ivolginsky District, Republic of Buryatia, Russia. The population was 2,754 as of 2010. There are 85 streets.

== Geography ==
Khoytobeye is located 14 km southwest of Ivolginsk (the district's administrative centre) by road. Verkhnyaya Ivolga is the nearest rural locality.
