= Kibalino =

Kibalino Кибалино
- Selo
- Location within Republic of Buryatia Location within Russia
- Coordinates: 51°25′N 107°01′E
- Country: Russia
- Region: Republic of Buryatia
- District: Ivolginsky District
- Time zone: UTC+8:00

Kibalino (Russian: Кибалино) is a rural locality (a selo) in Ivolginsky District, Republic of Buryatia, Russia. The population was 176 as of 2010. There is 1 street.

== Geography ==
Kibalino is located 49 km southwest of Ivolginsk (the district's administrative centre) by road. Orongoy is the nearest rural locality.
