= Suzha =

Huzhaa Һужаа
- Selo
- Location within Republic of Buryatia Location within Russia
- Coordinates: 51°46′N 107°28′E
- Country: Russia
- Region: Republic of Buryatia
- District: Ivolginsky District
- Time zone: UTC+8:00

Huzhaa (Buryat: Һужаа, Hujaa; Russian: Сужа) is a rural locality (a selo) in Ivolginsky District, Republic of Buryatia, Russia. The population was 1,887 as of 2010. There are 67 streets.

== Geography ==
Suzha is located 15 km northeast of Ivolginsk (the district's administrative centre) by road. Nur-Seleniye is the nearest rural locality.
