= Kolobki =

Kolobki Колобки
- Selo
- Location within Republic of Buryatia Location within Russia
- Coordinates: 51°38′N 107°22′E
- Country: Russia
- Region: Republic of Buryatia
- District: Ivolginsky District
- Time zone: UTC+8:00

Kolobki (Russian: Колобки) is a rural locality (a selo) in Ivolginsky District, Republic of Buryatia, Russia. The population was 300 as of 2010. There are 5 streets.

== Geography ==
Kolobki is located 15 km southeast of Ivolginsk (the district's administrative centre) by road. Solontsy is the nearest rural locality.
