= Verkhnyaya Zaimka =

Verkhnyaya Zaimka Верхняя Заимка
- Selo
- Location within Republic of Buryatia Location within Russia
- Coordinates: 55°50′N 110°08′E
- Country: Russia
- Region: Republic of Buryatia
- District: Severo-Baykalsky District
- Time zone: UTC+8:00

Verkhnyaya Zaimka (Russian: Верхняя Заимка) is a rural locality (a selo) in Severo-Baykalsky District, Republic of Buryatia, Russia. The population was 616 as of 2010. There are 14 streets.

== Geography ==
Verkhnyaya Zaimka is located 53 km east of Nizhneangarsk (the district's administrative centre) by road. Kichera is the nearest rural locality.
