= Resort Khakusy =

Health Resort in Buryati

Khakusy is a health resort with hot springs, located in the north of Buryatia, on the coast of Lake Baikal.

The hot Springs are located 700 meters from the shore of Lake Baikal. There are baths built at the water source in the pine forest.

The name "Khakusy" comes from the Evenk word meaning "heat", or "hot".

The Khakusy resort, founded in 1953, has 50 seats and running hot water in the baths. The resort is closed during autumn due to storms, and in the spring - because of the melting of ice on Lake Baikal. Khakusy is located in the wild, far from populated areas, so getting here can be done from Nizhneangarsk on a boat on Lake Baikal, or from Severobaikalsk by helicopter.

== Gallery ==
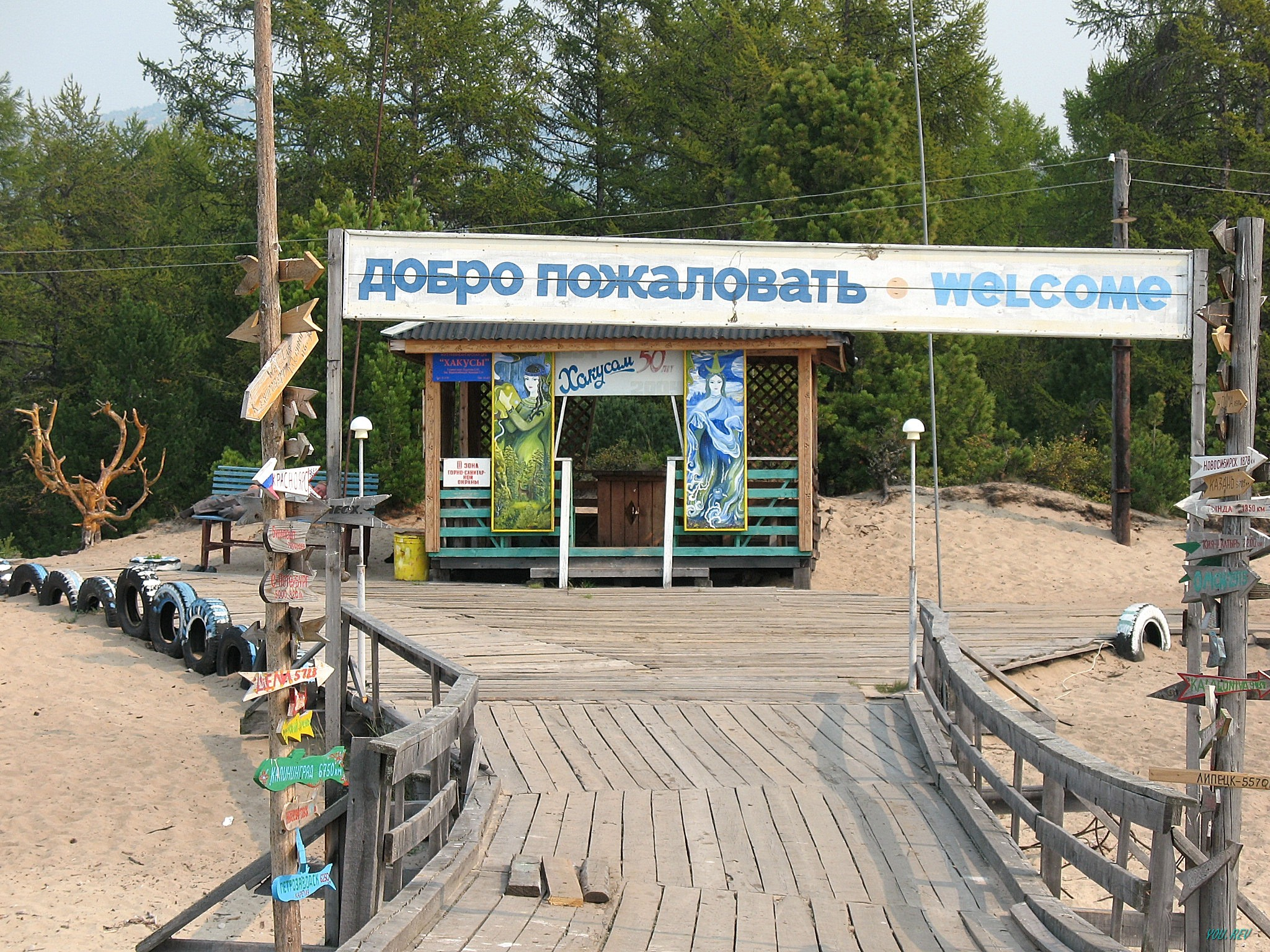
Pier of Khakusy

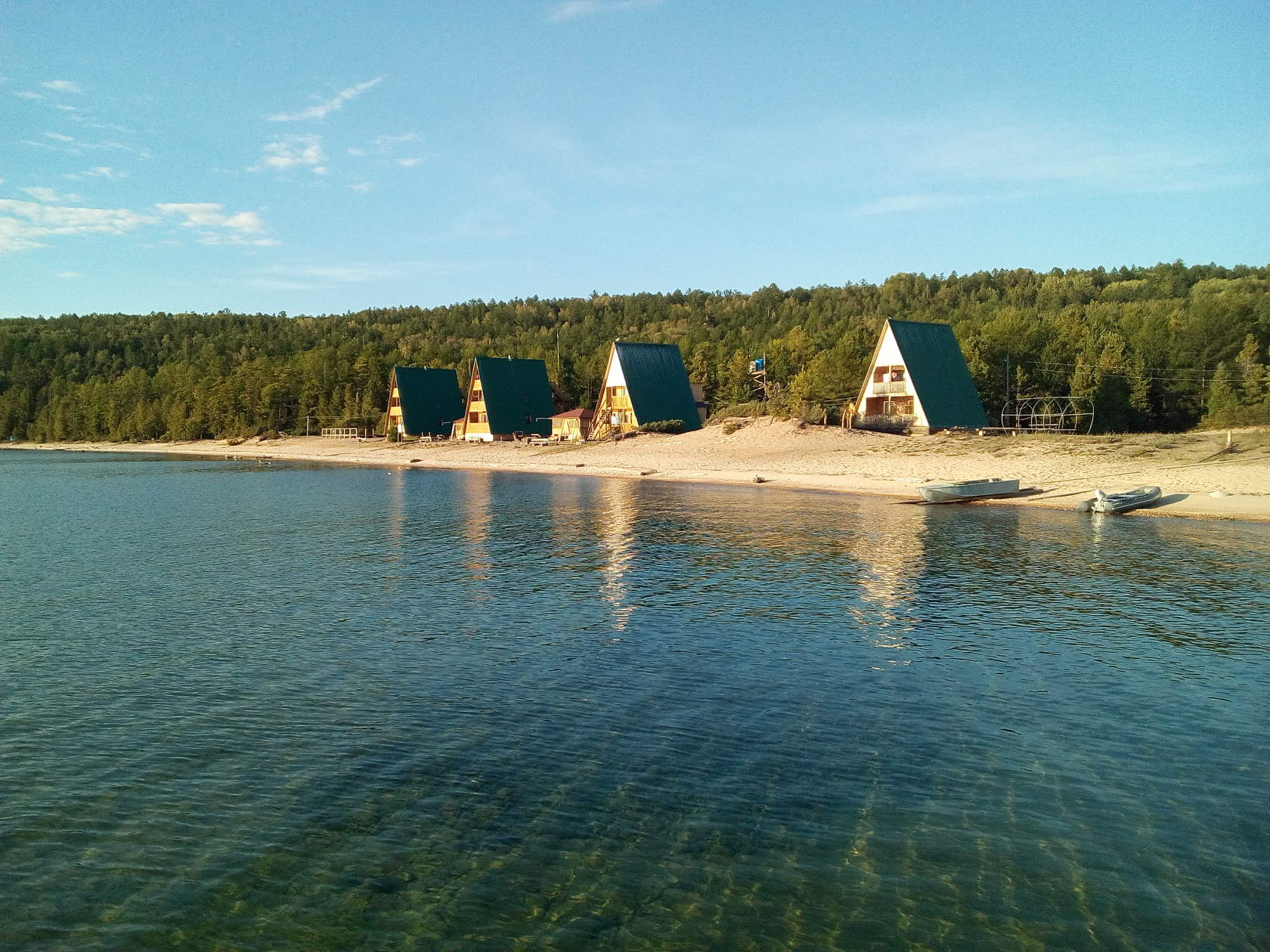
Resort Khakusy

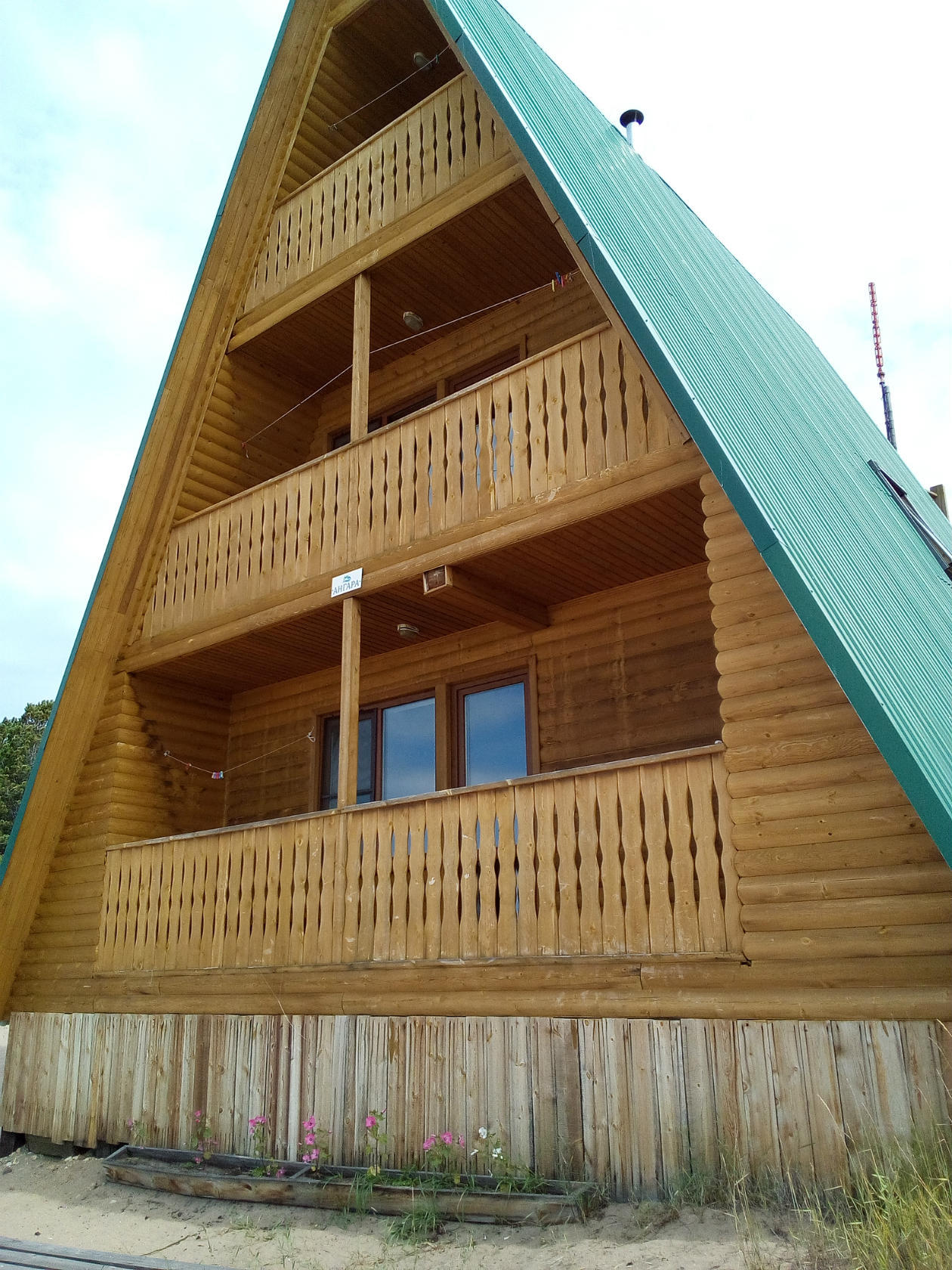
Camping

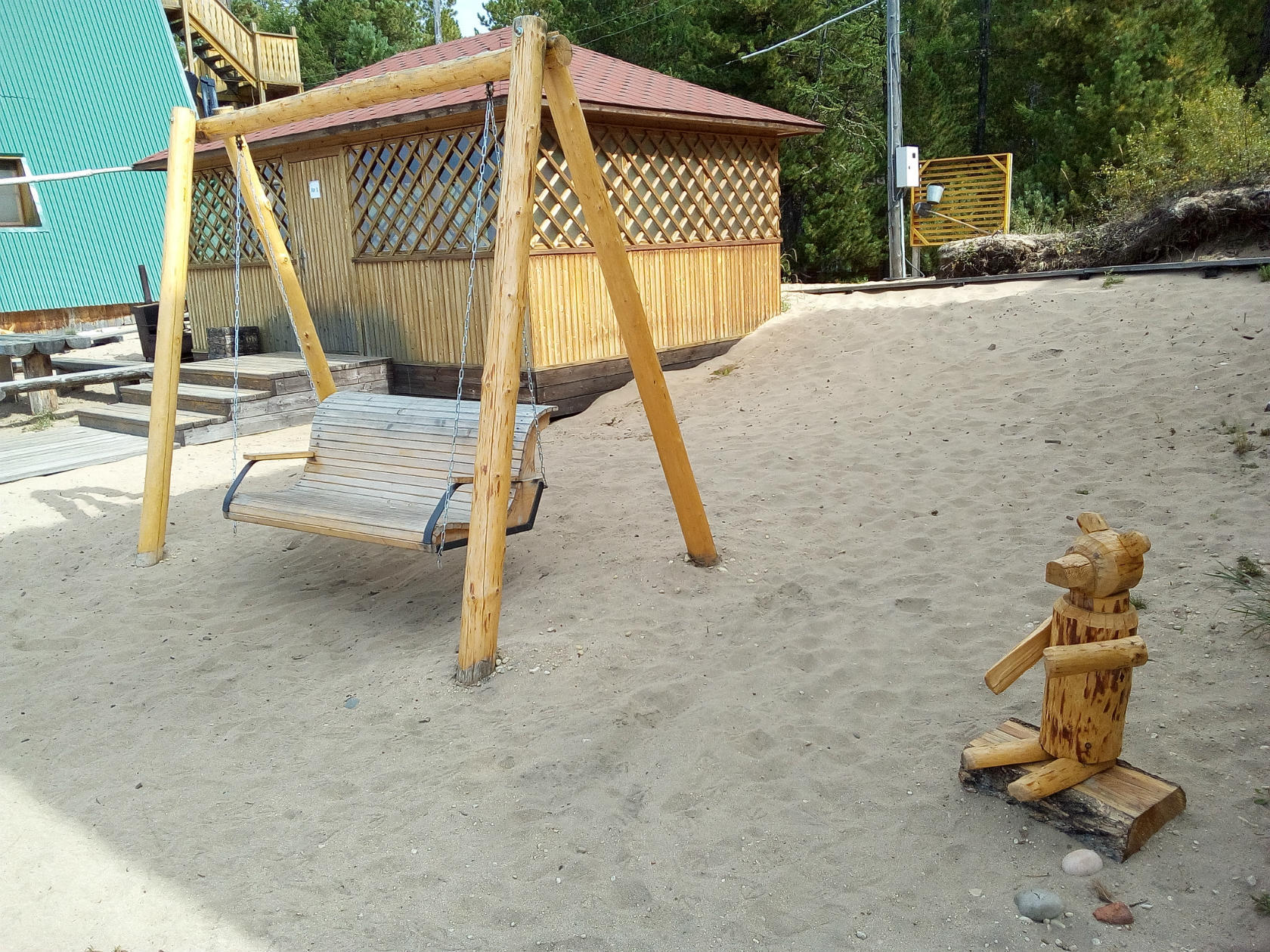
Playground for children

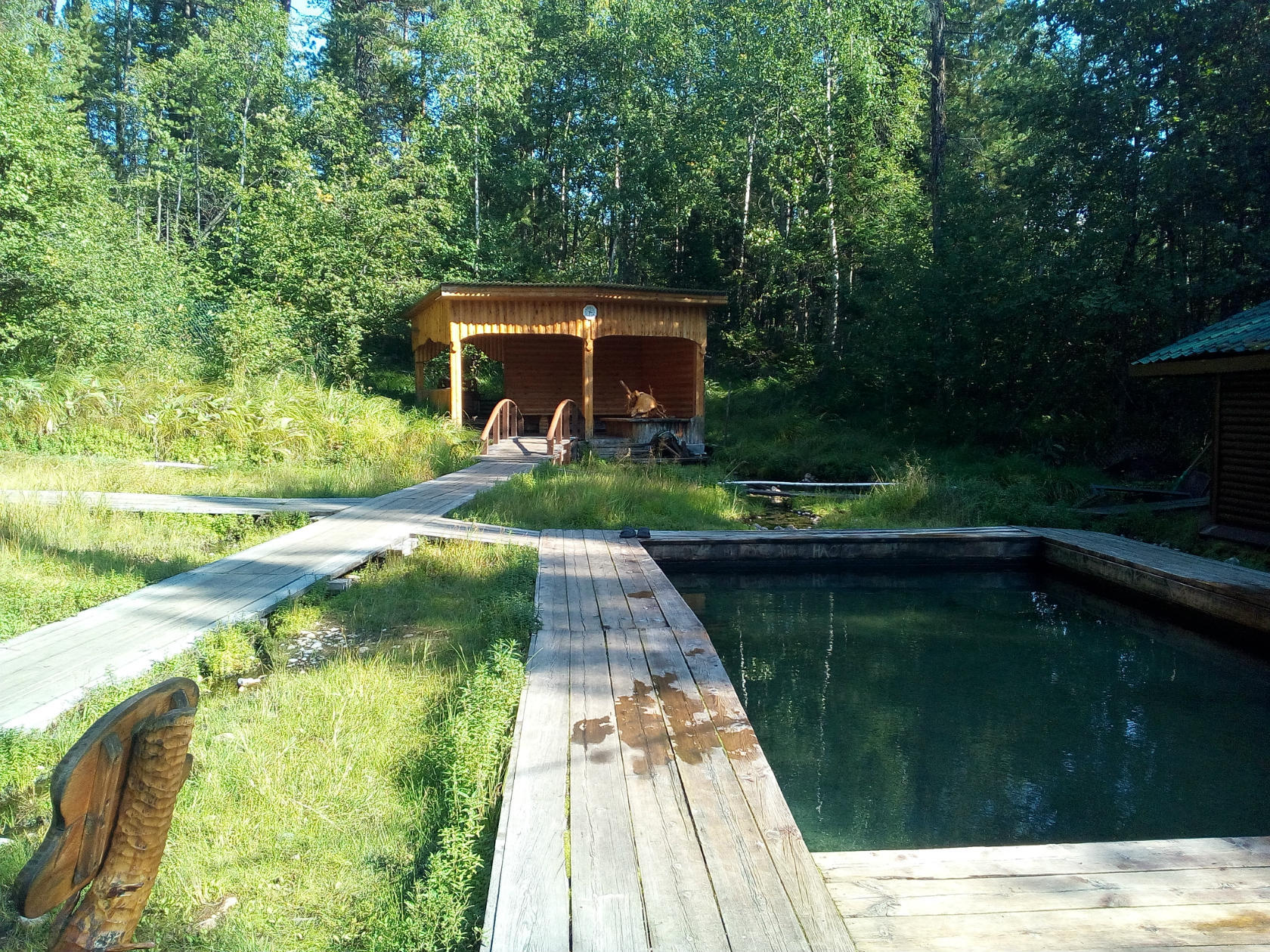
Therapeutic bath and gazebo

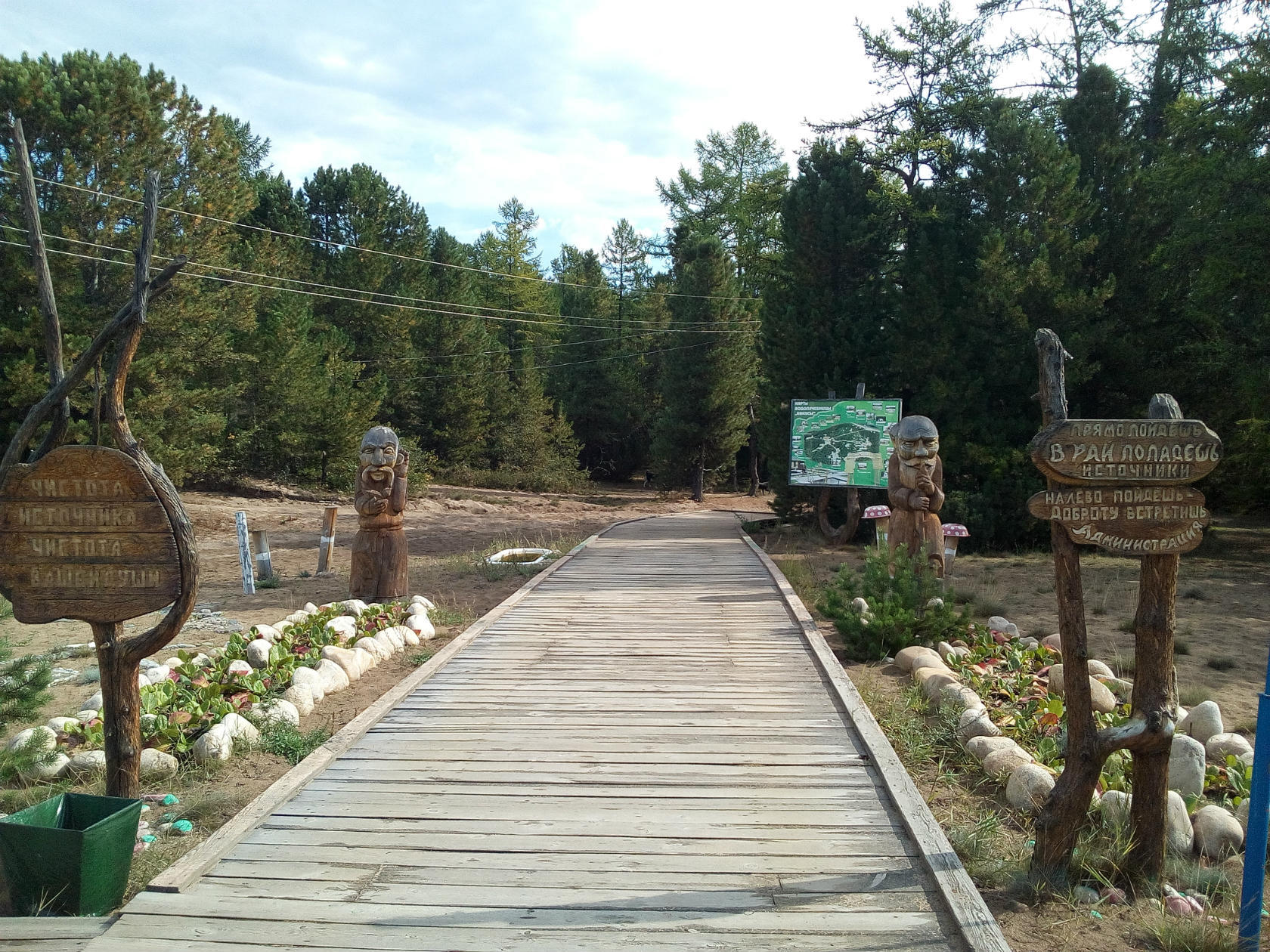
The sculptural composition of wood

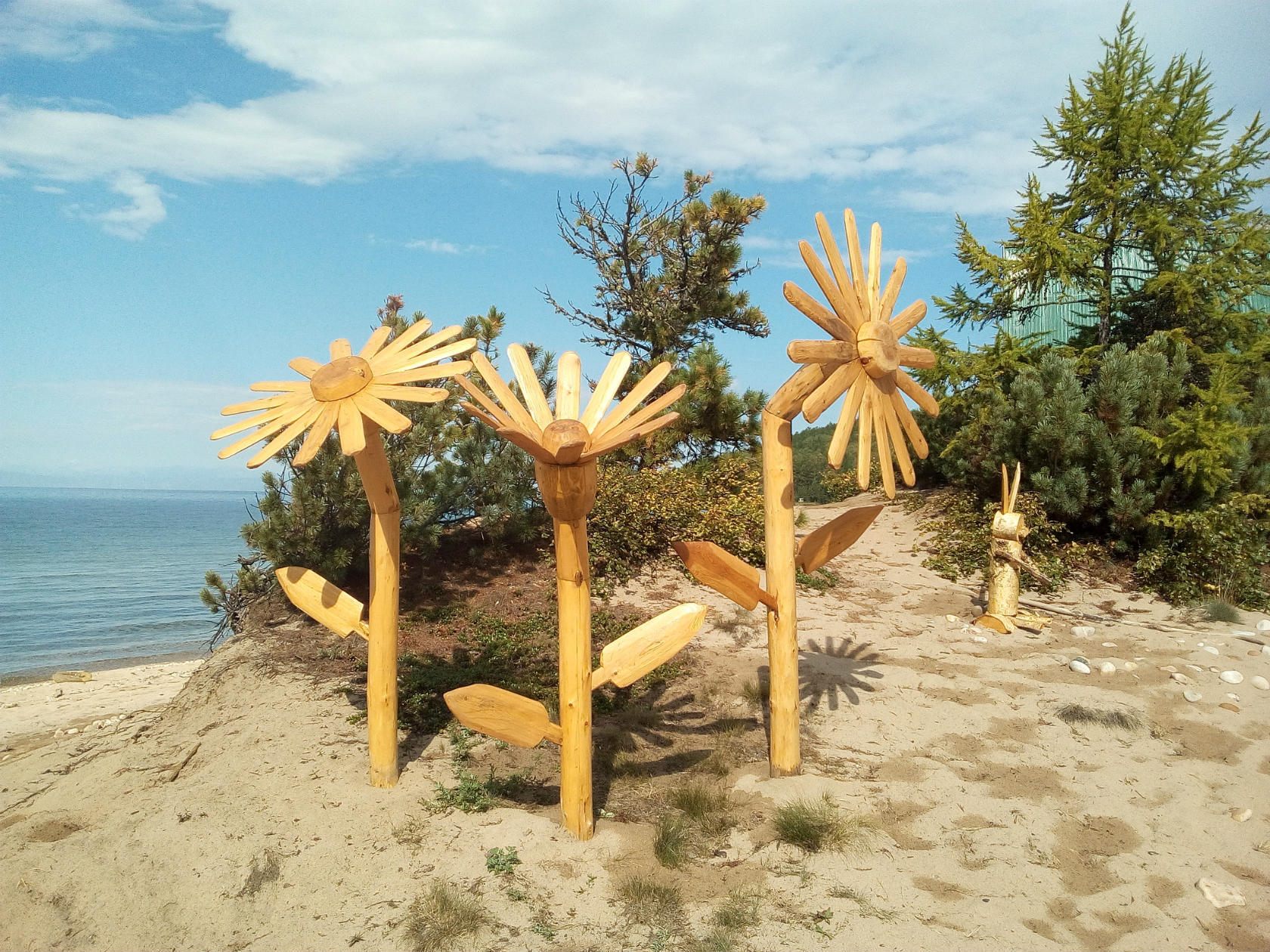
On the shore of Lake Baikal

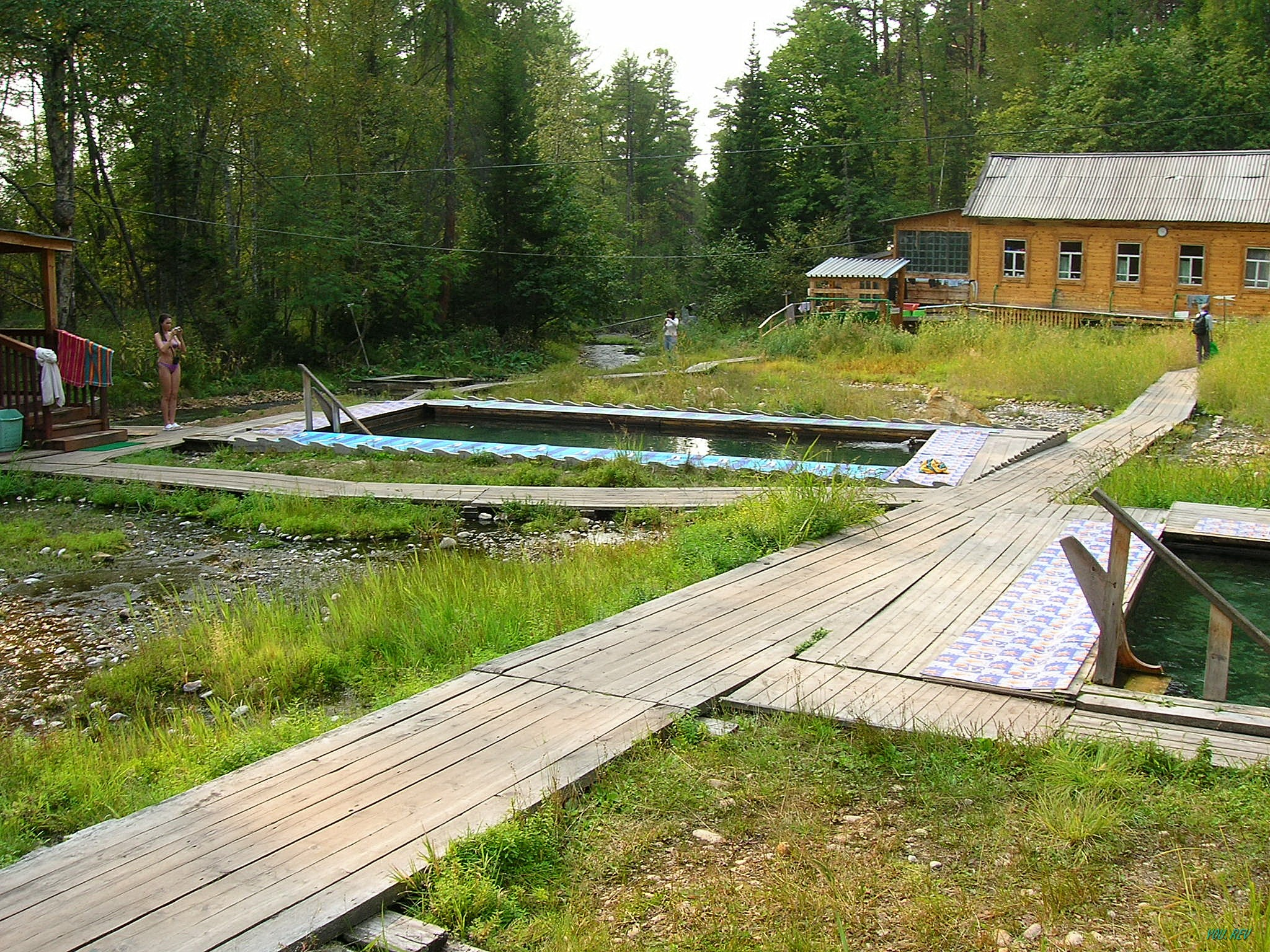
Glade with therapeutic pools

== Sources ==
- Горячие источники Хакусы
- Лечебный курорт Хакусы (Бурятия)
