= Zun-Orongoy =

Zun-Orongoy Зун-Оронгой
- Ulus
- Location within Republic of Buryatia Location within Russia
- Coordinates: 51°30′N 107°06′E
- Country: Russia
- Region: Republic of Buryatia
- District: Ivolginsky District
- Time zone: UTC+8:00

Zun-Orongoy (Russian: Зун-Оронгой; Buryat: Зүүн Оронго, Züün Orongo) is a rural locality (an ulus) in Ivolginsky District, Republic of Buryatia, Russia. The population was 79 as of 2010.

== Geography ==
Zun-Orongoy is located 37 km southwest of Ivolginsk (the district's administrative centre) by road. Orongoy is the nearest rural locality.
