= Poselye, Ivolginsky District, Republic of Buryatia =

Poselye Поселье
- Selo
- Location within Republic of Buryatia Location within Russia
- Coordinates: 51°48′N 107°32′E
- Country: Russia
- Region: Republic of Buryatia
- District: Ivolginsky District
- Time zone: UTC+8:00

Poselye (Russian: Поселье) is a rural locality (a selo) in Ivolginsky District, Republic of Buryatia, Russia. The population was 3,797 as of 2010. There are 128 streets.

== Geography ==
Poselye is located 22 km northeast of Ivolginsk (the district's administrative centre) by road. Soldatsky is the nearest rural locality.
