= Nur-Seleniye =

Nur-Seleniye Нур-Селение
- Ulus
- Location within Republic of Buryatia Location within Russia
- Coordinates: 51°46′N 107°27′E
- Country: Russia
- Region: Republic of Buryatia
- District: Ivolginsky District
- Time zone: UTC+8:00

Nur-Seleniye (Russian: Нур-Селение) is a rural locality (an ulus) in Ivolginsky District, Republic of Buryatia, Russia. The population was 1,871 as of 2010. There are 54 streets.

== Geography ==
Nur-Seleniye is located 13 km northeast of Ivolginsk (the district's administrative centre) by road. Suzha is the nearest rural locality.
