= Dushkachan =

Dushkachan Душкачан
- Settlement
- Location within Republic of Buryatia Location within Russia
- Coordinates: 55°50′N 109°40′E
- Country: Russia
- Region: Republic of Buryatia
- District: Severo-Baykalsky District
- Time zone: UTC+8:00

Dushkachan (Russian: Душкачан; Buryat: Душукачан, Dushukachan) is a rural locality (a settlement) in Severo-Baykalsky District, Republic of Buryatia, Russia. The population was 68 as of 2010. There are 3 streets.

== Geography ==
Dushkachan is located 10 km northeast of Nizhneangarsk (the district's administrative centre) by road. Nizhneangarsk is the nearest rural locality.
