= Khuramsha =

Khuramsha Хурамша
- Selo
- Location within Republic of Buryatia Location within Russia
- Coordinates: 51°37′N 106°59′E
- Country: Russia
- Region: Republic of Buryatia
- District: Ivolginsky District
- Time zone: UTC+8:00

Khuramsha (Russian: Хурамша) is a rural locality (a selo) in Ivolginsky District, Republic of Buryatia, Russia. The population was 996 as of 2010. There are 15 streets.

== Geography ==
Khuramsha is located 35 km southwest of Ivolginsk (the district's administrative centre) by road. Kokorino is the nearest rural locality.
