= Kokorino =

Kokorino Кокорино
- Selo
- Location within Republic of Buryatia Location within Russia
- Coordinates: 51°36′N 107°00′E
- Country: Russia
- Region: Republic of Buryatia
- District: Ivolginsky District
- Time zone: UTC+8:00

Kokorino (Russian: Кокорино) is a rural locality (a selo) in Ivolginsky District, Republic of Buryatia, Russia. The population was 747 as of 2010. There are 9 streets.

== Geography ==
Kokorino is located 33 km southwest of Ivolginsk (the district's administrative centre) by road. Khuramsha is the nearest rural locality.
