= Tapkhar =

Tapkhar Тапхар
- Settlement
- Location within Republic of Buryatia Location within Russia
- Coordinates: 51°43′N 107°22′E
- Country: Russia
- Region: Republic of Buryatia
- District: Ivolginsky District
- Time zone: UTC+8:00

Tapkhar (Russian: Тапхар; Buryat: Тобхор, Tobkhor) is a rural locality (a settlement) in Ivolginsky District, Republic of Buryatia, Russia. The population was 566 as of 2010. There is 1 street.

== Geography ==
Tapkhar is located 10 km southeast of Ivolginsk (the district's administrative centre) by road. Ulan-Ivolginsky is the nearest rural locality.
