= Kholodnaya, Republic of Buryatia =

Kholodnaya Холодная
- Settlement
- Location within Republic of Buryatia Location within Russia
- Coordinates: 56°13′N 109°52′E
- Country: Russia
- Region: Republic of Buryatia
- District: Severo-Baykalsky District

Area
  - Total: 0.4 km^{2} (0.15 sq mi)
- Time zone: UTC+8:00

Kholodnaya (Russian: Холодная) is a rural locality (a settlement) in Severo-Baykalsky District, Republic of Buryatia, Russia. The population was 345 as of 2010.

== Geography ==
Kholodnaya is located 77 km east of Nizhneangarsk (the district's administrative centre) by road.
