= Gilbira =

Gilbira Гильбира
- Ulus
- Location within Republic of Buryatia Location within Russia
- Coordinates: 51°34′N 106°58′E
- Country: Russia
- Region: Republic of Buryatia
- District: Ivolginsky District
- Time zone: UTC+8:00

Gilbira (Russian: Гильбира; Buryat: Гэльбэрэ, Gelbere) is a rural locality (an ulus) in Ivolginsky District, Republic of Buryatia, Russia. The population was 93 as of 2010. There are 10 streets.

== Geography ==
Gilbira is located 37 km southwest of Ivolginsk (the district's administrative centre) by road. Kokorino is the nearest rural locality.
