= Gurulba =

Gurulba Гурульба
- Selo
- Location within Republic of Buryatia Location within Russia
- Coordinates: 51°49′N 107°24′E
- Country: Russia
- Region: Republic of Buryatia
- District: Ivolginsky District
- Time zone: UTC+8:00

Gurulba (Russian: Гурульба; Buryat: Гγрэльбэ, Gürelbe) is a rural locality (a selo) in Ivolginsky District, Republic of Buryatia, Russia. The population was 2,707 as of 2010. There are 98 streets.

== Geography ==
Gurulba is located 30 km northeast of Ivolginsk (the district's administrative centre) by road. Khoytobeye is the nearest rural locality.
