= Krasnoyarovo, Republic of Buryatia =

Krasnoyarovo Красноярово
- Selo
- Location within Republic of Buryatia Location within Russia
- Coordinates: 51°47′N 107°17′E
- Country: Russia
- Region: Republic of Buryatia
- District: Ivolginsky District
- Time zone: UTC+8:00

Krasnoyarovo (Russian: Красноярово) is a rural locality (a selo) in Ivolginsky District, Republic of Buryatia, Russia. The population was 426 as of 2010. There are 6 streets.

== Geography ==
Krasnoyarovo is located 6 km north of Ivolginsk (the district's administrative centre) by road. Ivolginsk is the nearest rural locality.
