= Davsha =

Davsha Давша
- Settlement
- Location within Republic of Buryatia Location within Russia
- Coordinates: 54°21′N 109°30′E
- Country: Russia
- Region: Republic of Buryatia
- District: Severo-Baykalsky District
- Time zone: UTC+8:00

Davsha (Russian: Давша; Buryat: Дабшаа, Dabshaa) is a rural locality (a settlement) in Severo-Baykalsky District, Republic of Buryatia, Russia. The population was 18 as of 2010.

== Geography ==
Davsha is located 158 km south of Nizhneangarsk (the district's administrative centre) by road. Kurumkan is the nearest rural locality.
