= Uoyan =

Uoyan Уоян
- Settlement
- Location within Republic of Buryatia Location within Russia
- Coordinates: 56°07′N 111°37′E
- Country: Russia
- Region: Republic of Buryatia
- District: Severo-Baykalsky District
- Time zone: UTC+8:00

Uoyan (Russian: Уоян) is a rural locality (a settlement) in Severo-Baykalsky District, Republic of Buryatia, Russia. The population was 334 as of 2010. There are 11 streets.

== Geography ==
Uoyan is located 162 km east of Nizhneangarsk (the district's administrative centre) by road. Novy Uoyan is the nearest rural locality.
