= Upper Angara =

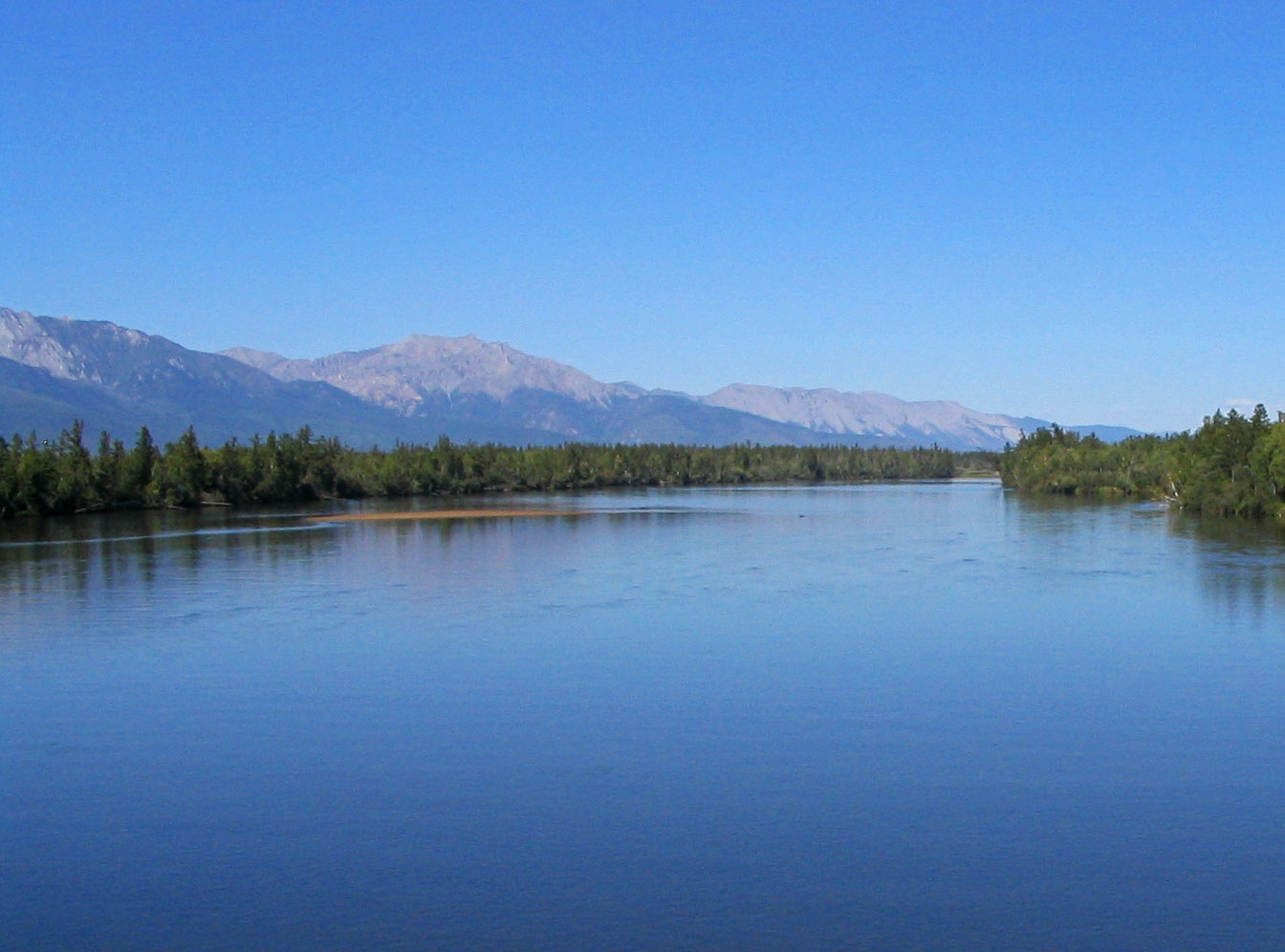
- View from the BAM railway bridge across the Upper Angara near Novy Uoyan

- Mouth location in Buryatia, Russia

Location
- Country: Russia

Physical characteristics
- Source: Delyun-Uran Range; Stanovoy Highlands
  - coordinates: 56°36′51″N 113°45′21″E
  - elevation: 1,600 m (5,200 ft)
- Mouth: Lake Baikal
  - coordinates: 55°42′24″N 109°52′33″E
- Length: 438 km (272 mi)
- Basin size: 21,400 km^{2} (8,300 sq mi)
- Discharge
  - average: 258 m^{3}/s (9,100 cu ft/s)

Basin features
- Progression: Lake Baikal→ Angara→ Yenisey→ Kara Sea

The Upper Angara (Russian: Верхняя Ангара, Verkhnyaya Angara; Buryat: Дээдэ Ангар, Deede Angar) is a river in Buryatia, Siberia to the northeast of Lake Baikal. the third longest river in the Baikal basin. It is 438 kilometres (272 mi) long, and has a drainage basin of 21,400 square kilometres (8,300 sq mi).

The Baikal–Amur Mainline runs along the north side of the river northeast up its valley, crossing between Anamakit and Novy Uoyan and crossing the river a second time upstream before heading into the mountains.

== Course ==
The Upper Angara rises at about 1,600 m (5,200 ft) in an area of small glacial lakes of the Delyun-Uran range, right by the Northern Muya Range, Stanovoy Highlands. It its upper course the river flows in a WSW direction across mountainous terrain, with rapids and waterfalls. It enters then a floodplain and crosses the spurs of the Upper Angara and the Barguzin ranges. Near Yanchukan it flows through the Upper Angara tectonic basin. Finally it ends in Lake Baikal forming a delta in the shallow northern end of the lake, separated from the deep part by long sandy spits, including Yarki Island. The Upper Angara is navigable in its last stretch.

The main tributaries of the Upper Angara are the 64 km (40 mi) long Angarakan, the 87 km (54 mi) long Yanchui, the 124 km (77 mi) long Churo and the 245 km (152 mi) long Kotera.

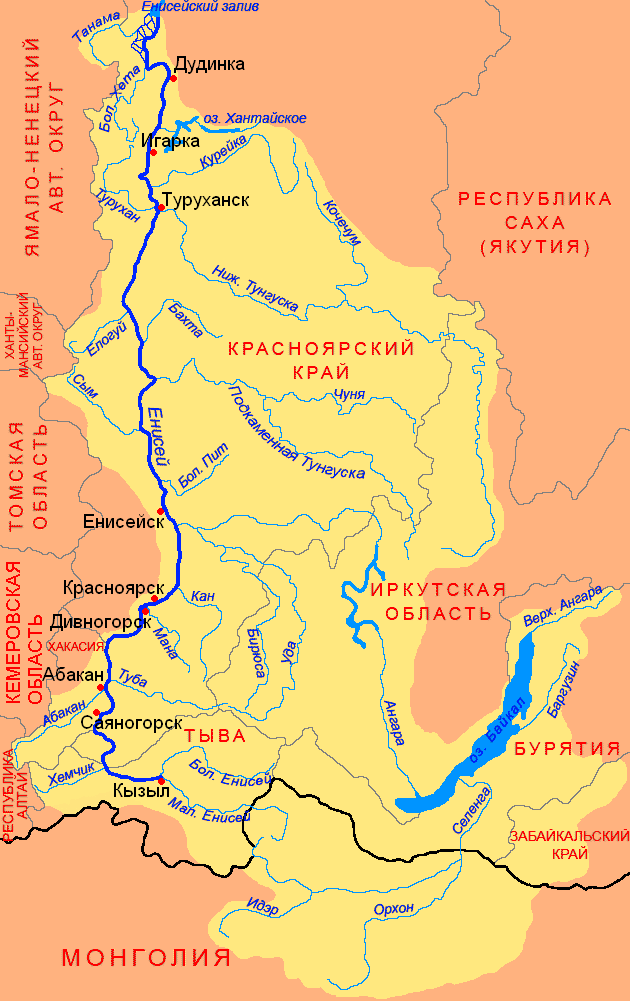
Yenisei basin with the Upper Angara at the NE end of Lake Baikal.

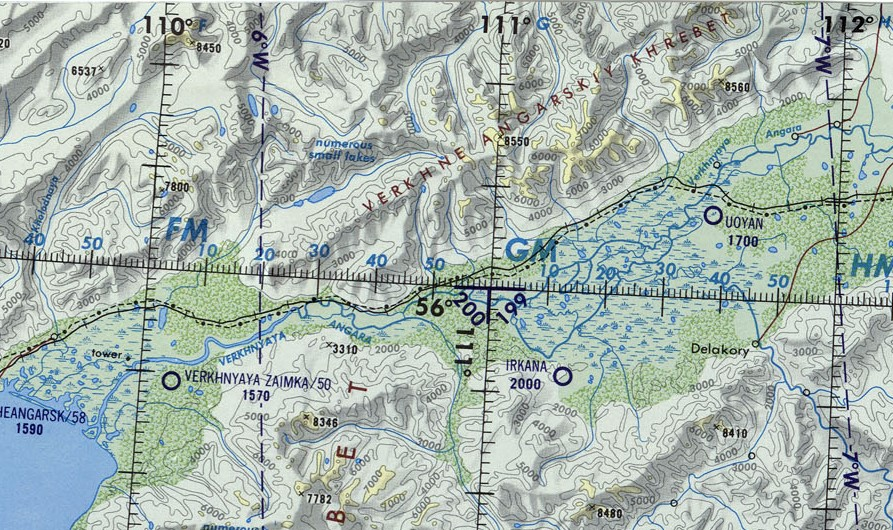
Upper Angara Range and Upper Angara River.

== See also ==
- List of rivers of Russia
