= Novy Uoyan =

Novy Uoyan Новый Уоян
- Urban-type settlement
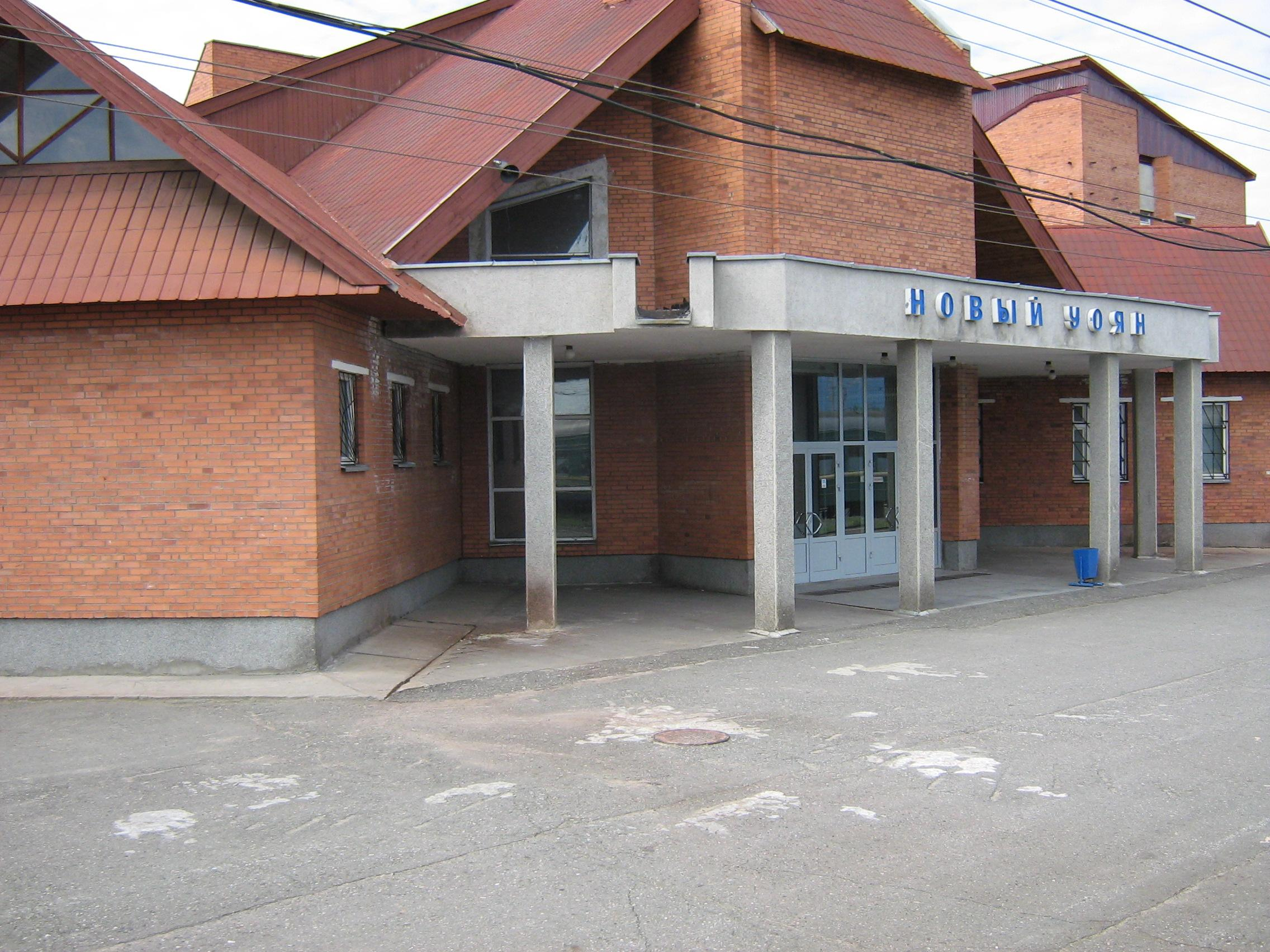
- Novy Uoyan railway station
- Interactive map of Novy Uoyan
- Location of Novy Uoyan Novy Uoyan (Republic of Buryatia)
- Coordinates: 56°09′N 111°44′E
- Country: Russia
- Federal subject: Buryatia
- Administrative district: Severo-Baykalsky District
- Urban-type settlementSelsoviet: Novy Uoyan Urban-Type Settlement
- Founded: mid-1970s
- Urban-type settlement status since: 1976
- Elevation: 512 m (1,680 ft)

Population (2010 Census)
  - Total: 3,963
  - Estimate (2025): 2,600 (−34.4%)

Administrative status
  - Capital of: Novy Uoyan Urban-Type Settlement

Municipal status
  - Municipal district: Severo-Baykalsky Municipal District
  - Urban settlement: Novy Uoyan Urban Settlement
  - Capital of: Novy Uoyan Urban Settlement
- Time zone: UTC+8 (MSK+5)
- Postal code: 671732
- OKTMO ID: 81645156051

Novy Uoyan population
- 2010 Census: 3,963
- 2002 Census: 4,957
- 1989 Census: 9,547
- 1979 Census: 5,312

Novy Uoyan (Russian: Но́вый Уоя́н; Buryat: Шэнэ Уоян, romanized: Shene Uoian) is an urban locality (an urban-type settlement) in Severo-Baykalsky District of the Republic of Buryatia, Russia, located in the basin of the Upper Angara River, 550 kilometers (340 mi) from Ulan-Ude, the capital of the republic. As of the 2010 Census, its population was 3,963.

== History ==
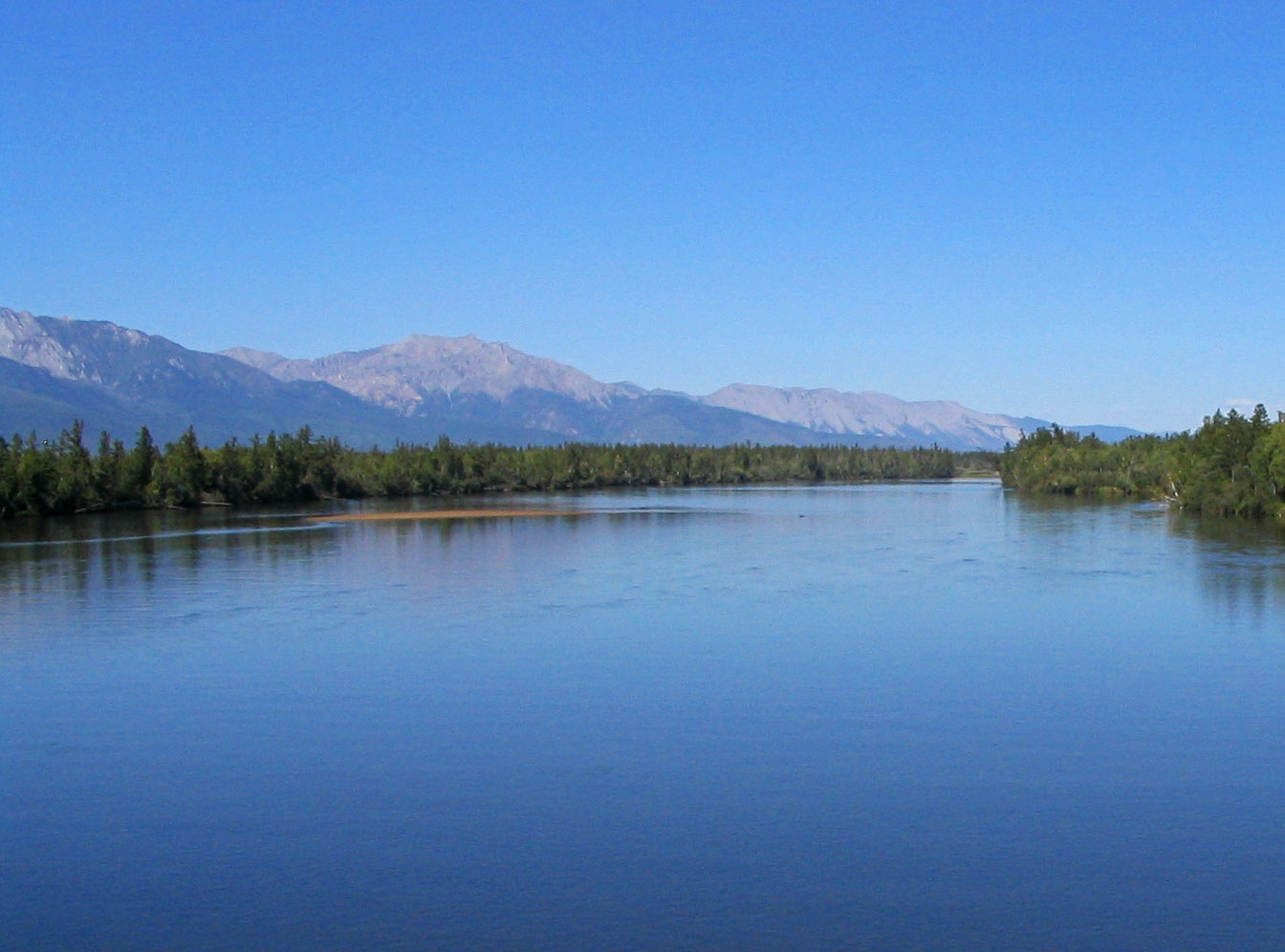
View of the Upper Angara River from the Baikal–Amur Mainline railway bridge near Novy Uoyan

It was founded in the mid-1970s in conjunction with the construction of the Baikal–Amur Mainline (BAM), near the settlement of Uoyan on the left bank of the Upper Angara. The railway station and the settlement were constructed by workers from the then Lithuanian SSR, as sections of the track were given patronage of Komsomol brigades from various parts of the Soviet Union. Urban-type settlement status was granted to it in 1976.

Regular traffic on the railway section between Severobaykalsk and Novaya Chara in northern Zabaykalsky Krai began in 1989. Completion of the BAM did not, however, bring the expected economic development, and with the economic crisis in the late 1980s, the population almost halved between 1989 and 2002.

== Administrative and municipal status ==
Within the framework of administrative divisions, the urban-type settlement (inhabited locality) of Novy Uoyan is incorporated within Severo-Baykalsky District as Novy Uoyan Urban-Type Settlement (an administrative division of the district). As a municipal division, Novy Uoyan Urban-Type Settlement is incorporated within Severo-Baykalsky Municipal District as Novy Uoyan Urban Settlement.

== Economy ==
Novy Uoyan is an important station on the Baikal–Amur Mainline, which presents the only real economic activity. The BAM crosses the Upper Angara close to the settlement via a 350-meter-long (1,150 ft) bridge.

There are proposals to build a 700-to-800-kilometer-long (430 to 500 mi) connection between the BAM and the Trans-Siberian Railway through Buryatia, with a northern terminus at Novy Uoyan, beginning either at Novoilyinsky, or from Mogzon in Zabaykalsky Krai. This section would be mainly intended to service mining developments, such as the lead and zinc Ozyorninskoye mine, which could be reached from the south by 2012.
