= Churo =

- Mouth location in Buryatia, Russia
- Native name: Чуро (Russian)

Location
- Country: Russia
- Federal subject: Buryatia

Physical characteristics
- Source: Upper Angara Range
- Mouth: Upper Angara
  - coordinates: 56°18′58″N 112°13′59.02″E
  - elevation: 528 m (1,732 ft)
- Length: 124 km (77 mi)
- Basin size: 1,990 km^{2} (770 sq mi)

Basin features
- Progression: Upper Angara → Lake Baikal

The Churo (Russian: Чуро) is a river in Buryatia, southern East Siberia, Russia. It is a tributary of the Upper Angara river of the Angara - Baikal basin. The river is 209 kilometres (130 mi) long, and has a drainage basin of 9,460 square kilometres (3,650 sq mi). There are no settlements by the river.

The Baikal–Amur Mainline runs near the confluence of the Churo and the Upper Angara.

== Course ==
The Churo is a right tributary of the Upper Angara River. Its sources are in an unnamed alpine lake of the western area of the Delyun-Uran Range. In its upper course it flows first southwestwards then westwards across a swampy valley. After bending southwards, its course marks the eastern limit of the Upper Angara Range. Finally, after meandering in a floodplain with lakes, it meets the Upper Angara 270 kilometres (170 mi) from its mouth in Lake Baikal.

The main tributaries of the Churo are the Avaikan, Uklon, Uanymi and Churokan. The river is frozen between October and May.

== See also ==
- List of rivers of Russia
