= Tankhoi =

Tankhoi Танхой
- Settlement
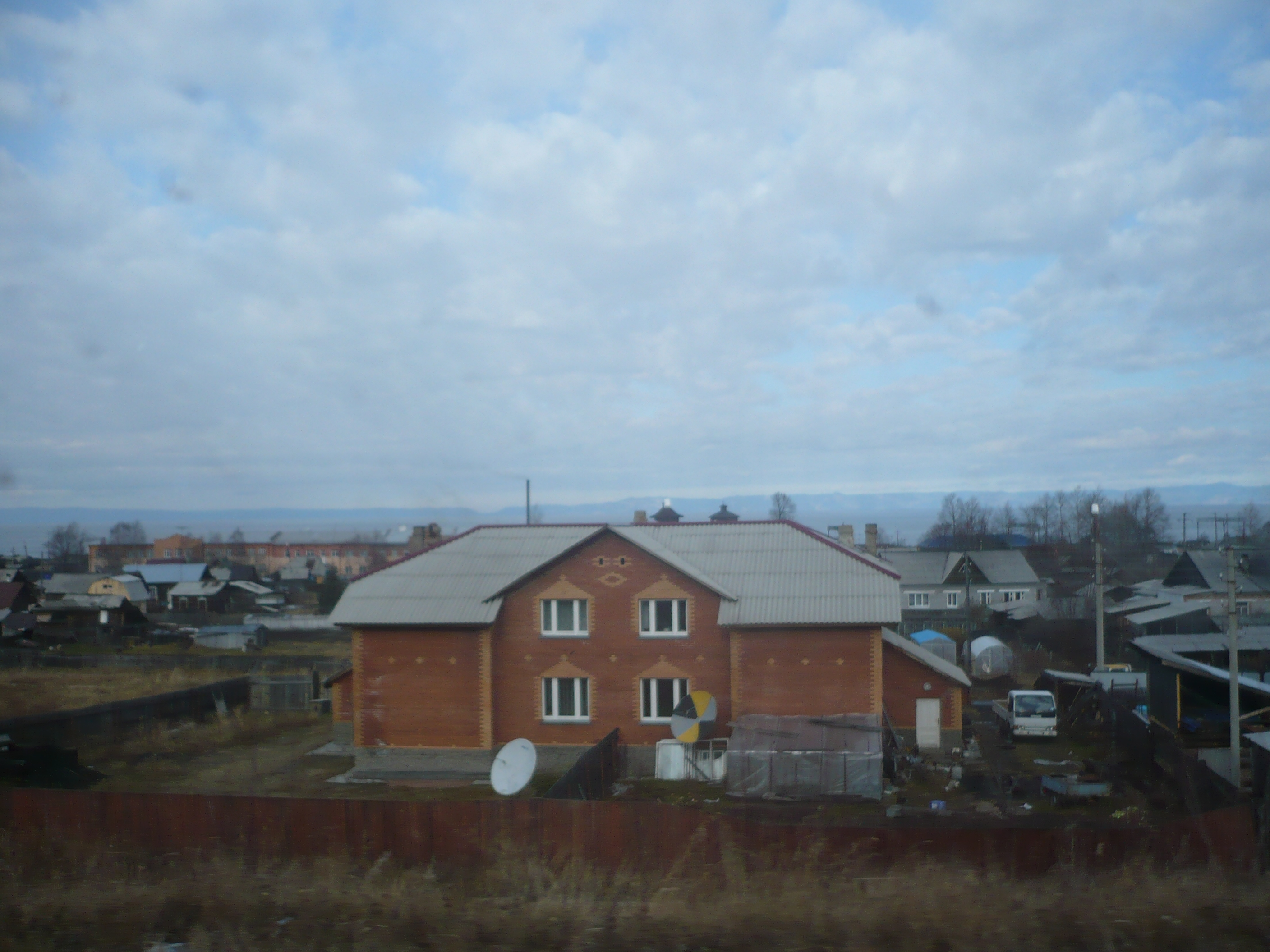

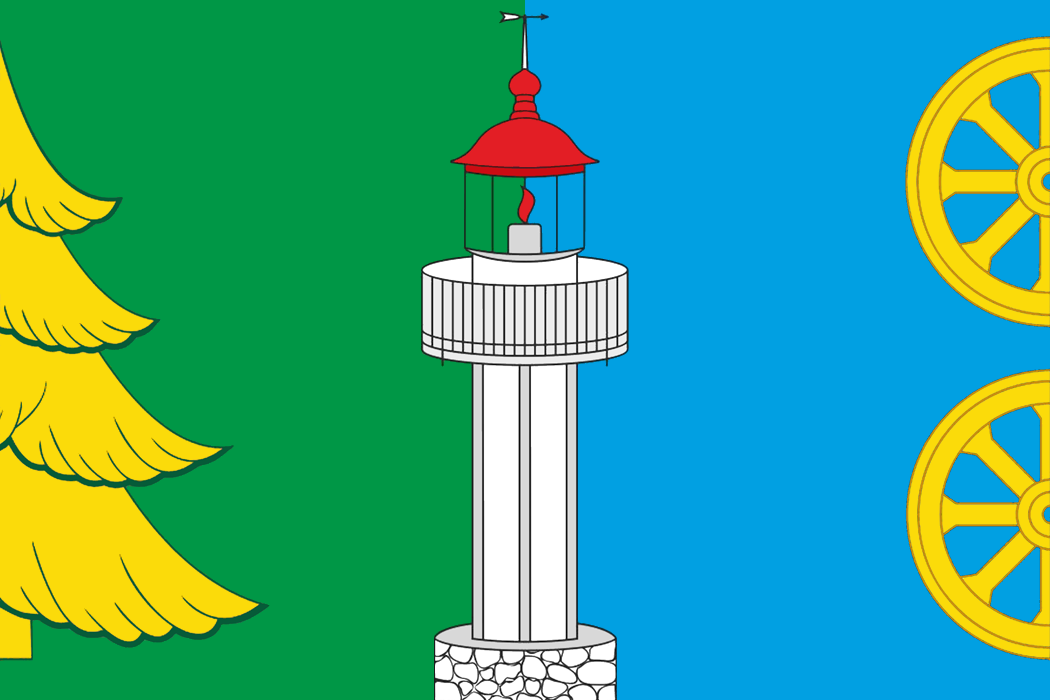
- Flag

- Location within Republic of Buryatia Location within Russia
- Coordinates: 51°33′N 105°07′E
- Country: Russia
- Region: Republic of Buryatia
- District: Kabansky District
- Time zone: UTC+8:00

Tankhoy (Russian: Танхой) is a rural locality (a settlement) in Kabansky District, Republic of Buryatia, Russia. The population was 940 as of 2013. There are 13 streets.

== Geography ==
Tankhoy is located 129 km southwest of Kabansk (the district's administrative centre) by road. Vydrino is the nearest rural locality.
