= Kichera =

Kichera Кичера
- Urban-type settlement
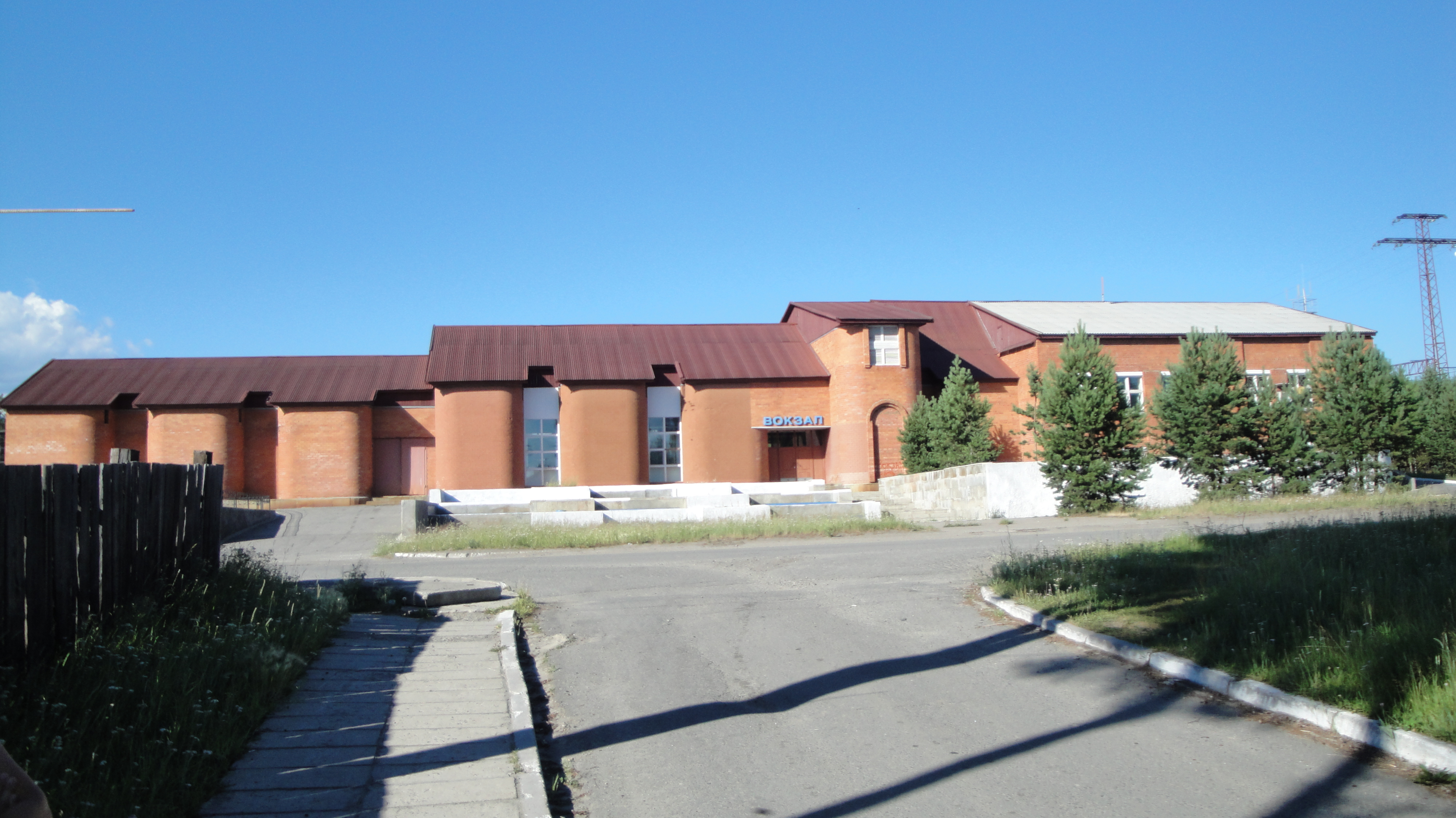
- Kichera station
- Interactive map of Kichera
- Location of Kichera Kichera (Republic of Buryatia)
- Coordinates: 55°56′N 110°06′E
- Country: Russia
- Federal subject: Buryatia
- Administrative district: Severo-Baykalsky District
- Urban-type settlementSelsoviet: Kichera Urban-Type Settlement
- Founded: 1978
- Urban-type settlement status since: 1979
- Elevation: 463 m (1,519 ft)

Population (2010 Census)
  - Total: 1,375
  - Estimate (2025): 840 (−38.9%)

Administrative status
  - Capital of: Kichera Urban-Type Settlement

Municipal status
  - Municipal district: Severo-Baykalsky Municipal District
  - Urban settlement: Kichera Urban Settlement
  - Capital of: Kichera Urban Settlement
- Time zone: UTC+8 (MSK+5)
- Postal code: 671719
- OKTMO ID: 81645154051

Kichera population
- 2010 Census: 1,375
- 2002 Census: 1,623
- 1989 Census: 2,715

Kichera (Russian: Киче́ра) is an urban locality (an urban-type settlement) in Severo-Baykalsky District of the Republic of Buryatia, Russia. As of the 2010 Census, its population was 1,375.

== History ==
Urban-type settlement status was granted to Kichera in 1979.

== Administrative and municipal status ==
Within the framework of administrative divisions, the urban-type settlement (inhabited locality) of Kichera is incorporated within Severo-Baykalsky District as Kichera Urban-Type Settlement (an administrative division of the district). As a municipal division, Kichera Urban-Type Settlement is incorporated within Severo-Baykalsky Municipal District as Kichera Urban Settlement.
