= Krasnoyarovo, Ilishevsky District, Republic of Bashkortostan =

Krasnoyarovo Красноярово
- Village
- Location within Bashkortostan Location within Russia
- Coordinates: 55°39′N 54°19′E
- Country: Russia
- Region: Bashkortostan
- District: Ilishevsky District
- Time zone: UTC+5:00

Krasnoyarovo (Russian: Красноярово; Bashkir: Ҡыҙылъяр, Qıźılyar) is a rural locality (a village) in Novomedvedevsky Selsoviet, Ilishevsky District, Bashkortostan, Russia. The population was 185 as of 2010. There are 2 streets.

== Geography ==
Krasnoyarovo is located 34 km north of Verkhneyarkeyevo (the district's administrative centre) by road. Starobiktovo is the nearest rural locality.
