= Krasnoyarovo, Karmaskalinsky District, Republic of Bashkortostan =

Krasnoyarovo Красноярово
- Village
- Location within Bashkortostan Location within Russia
- Coordinates: 54°24′N 56°27′E
- Country: Russia
- Region: Bashkortostan
- District: Karmaskalinsky District
- Time zone: UTC+5:00

Krasnoyarovo (Russian: Красноярово; Bashkir: Ҡыҙылъяр, Qıźılyar) is a rural locality (a village) in Sakhayevsky Selsoviet, Karmaskalinsky District, Bashkortostan, Russia. The population was 21 as of 2010. There are two streets.

== Geography ==
Krasnoyarovo is located 29 km east of Karmaskaly (the district's administrative centre) by road. Syskanovo is the nearest rural locality.
