= Severobaykalsk =

Town in the Republic of Buryatia, Russia

Severobaikalsk Северобайкальск
- Town

Other transcription(s)
  - Buryat: Хойто-Байгал
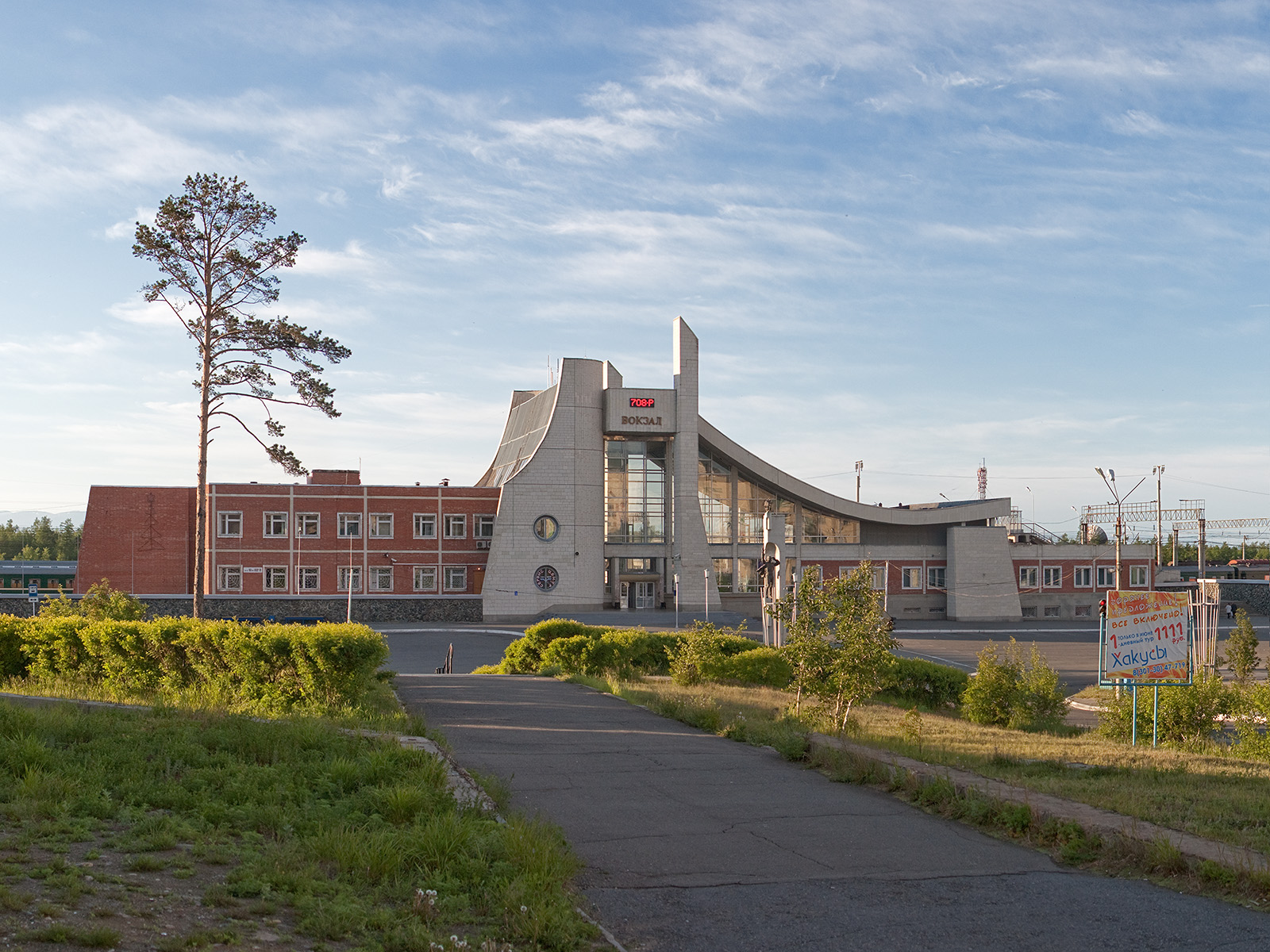
- Severobaikalsk railway station

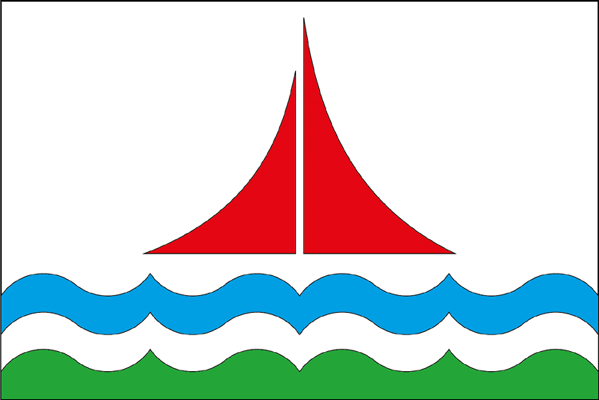
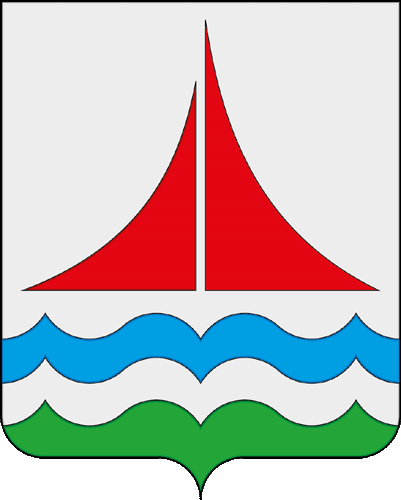
- Flag Coat of arms
- Interactive map of Severobaikalsk
- Location of Severobaikalsk Severobaikalsk (Republic of Buryatia)
- Coordinates: 55°39′N 109°19′E
- Country: Russia
- Federal subject: Buryatia
- Founded: 1974
- Town status since: 1980

Government
  - Mayor: Constantin Mahilovich Goyayunov
- Elevation: 500 m (1,600 ft)

Population (2010 Census)
  - Total: 24,929
  - Estimate (2025): 24,375 (−2.2%)

Administrative status
  - Subordinated to: town of republic significance of Severobaikalsk
  - Capital of: town of republic significance of Severobaikalsk

Municipal status
  - Urban okrug: Severobaikalsk Urban Okrug
  - Capital of: Severobaikalsk Urban Okrug
- Time zone: UTC+8 (MSK+5)
- Postal code: 81420
- Dialing code: +7 30130
- OKTMO ID: 81720000001

Severobaikalsk (Russian: Северобайка́льск; Buryat: Хойто-Байгал, Khoito-Baigal) is a town in the Republic of Buryatia, Russia, located on the northern end of Lake Baikal at the mouth of the Tyya River, 440 kilometers (270 mi) northwest of Ulan-Ude and 490 kilometers (300 mi) northeast of Irkutsk. Population: 24,233 (2021 census);

== Geography ==
Severobaikalsk is located on a plateau at the northern end of Lake Baikal at the mouth of the Tyya River. To the west the town is surrounded by the Baikal Mountains, to the northeast by the Stanovoy Range. Severobaikalsk is geographically isolated, the closest town is Ust-Kut, more than 260 kilometers (160 mi) away. The closest large cities are Ulan-Ude, 440 kilometers (270 mi) to the southeast and Irkutsk, more than 490 kilometers (300 mi) to the southwest.

== History ==
The history of Severobaikalsk is closely related to the history of the Baikal-Amur Mainline (BAM). It was founded in 1974 as a work settlement for workers constructing the BAM, serving as a logistics center and a central starting point for the railway project. To the west the railway line was developed to Bratsk and to the east to Tynda. At this time the only settlement in the area was the village Nizhneangarsk, located at the edge of a swampy plain at the northern tip of the lake. It was decided to develop the new town Severobaikalsk 20 kilometers (12 mi) southwest of Nizhneangarsk on a plateau above the lake, thus allowing further extensions and development in the future. Originally it was planned to increase the population to 140,000 people.

The first volunteers of the Komsomol and workers arrived in 1974 and founded a work camp that would later become the town of Severobaikalsk. The camp was initially named Novogodny (Russian: Новогодний, lit. New Year) and consisted of tents, wooden shacks and railway cars. The camp grew rapidly with the development of the railway, and Severobaikalsk was eventually granted town status in 1980. During this time until official completion of the railway line in 1984 the town had a partnership with Leningrad. Since completion of the Baikal Amur Mainline the town has been in decline, with many projects cancelled during Perestroika.

Population reached a high with an estimated 35,000 inhabitants in the 1980s and subsequently declined. As the town was founded mostly by volunteers of the Komsomol the population is relatively young. Ninety percent of the population is Russian Orthodox and ten percent are Buryats.

== Administrative and municipal status ==
Within the framework of administrative divisions, it is incorporated as the town of republic significance of Severobaikalsk—an administrative unit with the status equal to that of the districts. As a municipal division, the town of republic significance of Severobaikalsk is incorporated as Severobaikalsk Urban Okrug.

== Climate ==
As a Siberian town, Severobaikalsk experiences a subarctic climate (Dfc), characterized by extreme variation of temperatures between seasons. Temperatures can be very warm in the summer, and brutally cold in the winter. The warmest month of the year in Severobaikalsk is July, when the mean temperature is +16 °C (61 °F). The coldest month of the year is January, when the mean temperature is −23 °C (−9 °F).

Climate data for Severobaikalsk
Month	Jan	Feb	Mar	Apr	May	Jun	Jul	Aug	Sep	Oct	Nov	Dec	Year
Mean daily maximum °C (°F)	−17.3 (0.9)	−14.7 (5.5)	−4.8 (23.4)	3.6 (38.5)	12.0 (53.6)	19.5 (67.1)	22.4 (72.3)	20.9 (69.6)	13.7 (56.7)	3.8 (38.8)	−6.3 (20.7)	−12.9 (8.8)	3.3 (38.0)
Daily mean °C (°F)	−22.9 (−9.2)	−21.6 (−6.9)	−12.9 (8.8)	−2.9 (26.8)	5.0 (41.0)	11.9 (53.4)	15.7 (60.3)	14.7 (58.5)	7.9 (46.2)	−1.0 (30.2)	−11.5 (11.3)	−18.2 (−0.8)	−3.0 (26.6)
Mean daily minimum °C (°F)	−28.4 (−19.1)	−28.5 (−19.3)	−21.0 (−5.8)	−9.4 (15.1)	−1.9 (28.6)	4.4 (39.9)	9.1 (48.4)	8.6 (47.5)	2.2 (36.0)	−5.8 (21.6)	−16.7 (1.9)	−23.4 (−10.1)	−9.2 (15.4)
Average precipitation mm (inches)	16 (0.6)	12 (0.5)	10 (0.4)	17 (0.7)	28 (1.1)	37 (1.5)	65 (2.6)	63 (2.5)	42 (1.7)	23 (0.9)	22 (0.9)	19 (0.7)	354 (14.1)
Source: Climate-Data.org

Historical population
Year	Pop.	±%
1979	12,882	—
1989	28,336	+120.0%
2002	25,231	−11.0%
2010	24,929	−1.2%
2021	24,233	−2.8%
Source: Census data

== Cityscape ==
Like most Soviet-planned cities, the town center is dominated by five to six floor high rise buildings made of prefabricated concrete panels. Because the northern region of Lake Baikal is in a seismically active region the standard design of the high rise buildings has been adapted to ensure greater resistance to earthquakes. The suburbs are dominated by shacks that trace back to the early foundation period when Severobaikalsk was a work camp. Some of these shacks are made of old railway cars.

The main street of Severobaikalsk is Leningradsky Avenue, which starts at the railway station and runs through the central area of the town. The shape of the railway station building is meant to resemble a sail and was designed by architects from Leningrad. In front of the railway station is a monument to volunteers and workers from Leningrad who built the town. North of the railway station, along Leningradsky Avenue is the main square, where the town administration and the Palace of Culture of the railway workers are located. Severobaikalsk also has a church and a museum dedicated to the history of the Baikal Amur Mainline.

== Transportation ==
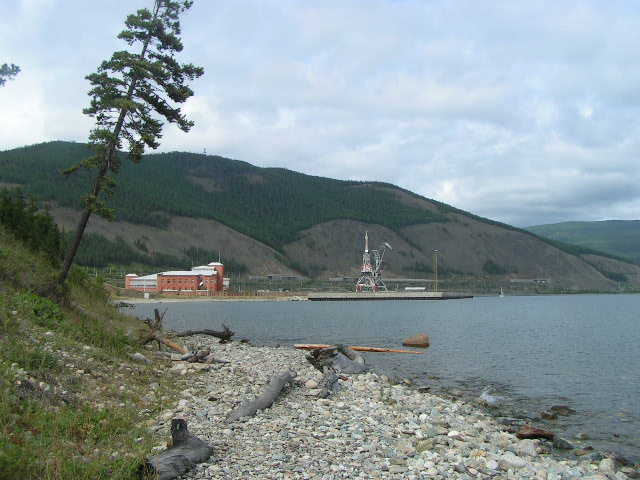
Port of Severobaikalsk

Severobaikalsk is connected by the Baikal-Amur Mainline to Bratsk and Tayshet in the west and Tynda and Komsomolsk-on-Amur and in the east. In the summer Voskhod hydrofoils connect Severobaikalsk with Irkutsk via Port Baikal. By air Severobaikalsk is connected with Irkutsk and Ulan-Ude via Nizhneangarsk Airport located 23 kilometers (14 mi) north of the town.

There is a mountain road to Ul'kan (Авто ВАМ) and Ust-Kut.
