= Yanchukan =

Yanchukan Янчукан
- Urban-type settlement
- Flag
- Interactive map of Yanchukan
- Location of Yanchukan Yanchukan (Republic of Buryatia)
- Coordinates: 56°15′N 112°48′E
- Country: Russia
- Federal subject: Buryatia
- Administrative district: Severo-Baykalsky District
- Urban-type settlementSelsoviet: Yanchukan Urban-Type Settlement
- Founded: 1976
- Urban-type settlement status since: 1982

Population (2010 Census)
  - Total: 392
  - Estimate (2025): 228 (−41.8%)

Administrative status
  - Capital of: Yanchukan Urban-Type Settlement

Municipal status
  - Municipal district: Severo-Baykalsky Municipal District
  - Urban settlement: Yanchukan Urban Settlement
  - Capital of: Yanchukan Urban Settlement
- Time zone: UTC+8 (MSK+5)
- Postal code: 671735
- OKTMO ID: 81645175051

Yanchukan population
- 2010 Census: 392
- 2002 Census: 539
- 1989 Census: 1,462

Yanchukan (Russian: Янчука́н) is an urban locality (an urban-type settlement) in Severo-Baykalsky District of the Republic of Buryatia, Russia. As of the 2010 Census, its population was 392.

== History ==
Urban-type settlement status was granted to Yanchukan in 1982.

== Administrative and municipal status ==
Within the framework of administrative divisions, the urban-type settlement (inhabited locality) of Yanchukan is incorporated within Severo-Baykalsky District as Yanchukan Urban-Type Settlement (an administrative division of the district). As a municipal division, Yanchukan Urban-Type Settlement is incorporated within Severo-Baykalsky Municipal District as Yanchukan Urban Settlement.
