= Severo-Baykalsky District =

Severo-Baykalsky District Северо-Байкальский район (Russian)
- District

Other transcription(s)
  - Buryat: Хойто-Байгалай аймаг
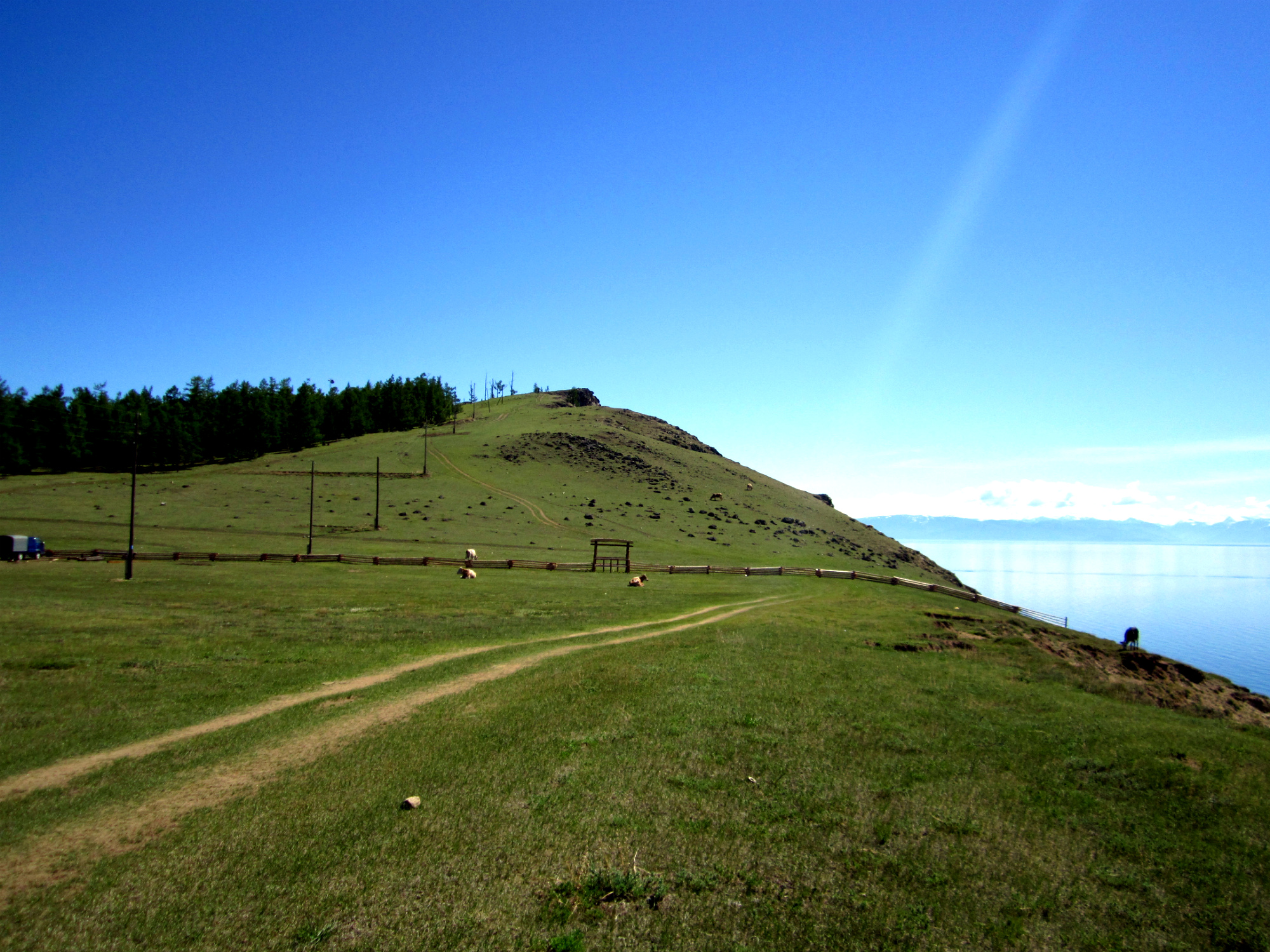
- Ayaya, North Baikal area, Severo-Baikalsky District

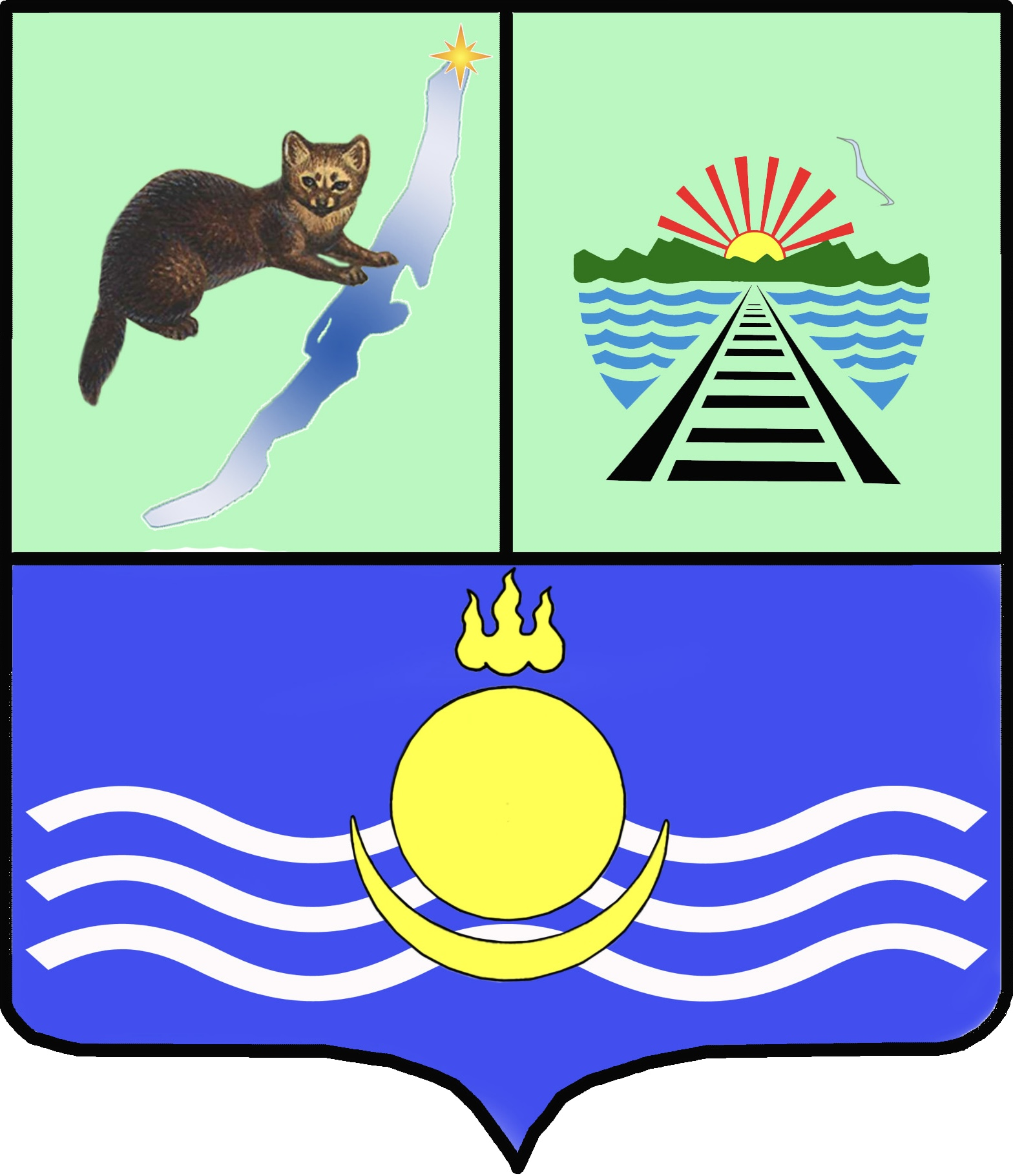
- Flag Coat of arms
- Location of Severo-Baykalsky District in the Republic of Buryatia
- Coordinates: 56°00′N 111°30′E
- Country: Russia
- Federal subject: Republic of Buryatia
- Established: September 10, 1925
- Administrative center: Nizhneangarsk

Government
  - Type: Local government
  - Body: Council of People's Deputies
  - Head: Igor Pukharev

Area
  - Total: 54,000 km^{2} (21,000 sq mi)

Population (2010 Census)
  - Total: 14,035
  - Density: 0.26/km^{2} (0.67/sq mi)
  - Urban: 76.7%
  - Rural: 23.3%

Administrative structure
  - Administrative divisions: 4 Urban-type settlements, 6 Selsoviets
  - Inhabited localities: 4 urban-type settlements, 8 rural localities

Municipal structure
  - Municipally incorporated as: Severo-Baykalsky Municipal District
  - Municipal divisions: 4 urban settlements, 6 rural settlements
- Time zone: UTC+8 (MSK+5)
- OKTMO ID: 81645000
- Website: http://www.sb-raion.ru

Population of Severo-Baykalsky District
- 2010 Census: 14,035
- 2002 Census: 16,446
- 1989 Census: 40,213
- 1979 Census: 37,630

Severo-Baykalsky District (Russian: Се́веро-Байка́льский райо́н; Buryat: Хойто-Байгалай аймаг, Khoito-Baigalai aimag) is an administrative and municipal district (raion), one of the twenty-one in the Republic of Buryatia, Russia. It is located in the northeast of the republic. The area of the district is 54,000 square kilometers (21,000 sq mi). Its administrative center is the urban locality (an urban-type settlement) of Nizhneangarsk. As of the 2010 Census, the total population of the district was 14,035, with the population of Nizhneangarsk accounting for 35.8% of that number.

== History ==
The district was established on September 10, 1925.

== Geography ==
The district is located in the north of Buryatia, encompassing the northern part of Lake Baikal from three sides. In the west and north, the area along the watershed of the Baikal Mountains and the North Baikal Highlands borders on Irkutsk Oblast; in the east, along the ranges connecting the Northern Muya Range and Southern Muya Range it borders with the Muisky District and a small section of the Bauntovsky District; in the southeast it includes the watershed of the Barguzin Range and borders with the Kurumkansky District and in the far south, with a small area of the Barguzinsky District. The district border Irkutsk Oblast: Olkhonsky and Kachugsky District to the south and southwest, Kazachinsko-Lensky District to the west, Kirensky District to the northwest, Mamsko-Chuysky District to the north, and Bodaybinsky District to the northeast.

== Administrative and municipal status ==
Within the framework of administrative divisions, Severo-Baykalsky District is one of the twenty-one in the Republic of Buryatia. It is divided into four urban-type settlements (administrative divisions with the administrative centers, correspondingly, in the urban-type settlements (inhabited localities) of Kichera, Nizhneangarsk, Novy Uoyan, and Yanchukan) and six selsoviets, all of which comprise eight rural localities. As a municipal division, the district is incorporated as Severo-Baykalsky Municipal District. The four urban-type settlements are incorporated as four urban settlements, and the six selsoviets are incorporated as six rural settlements within the municipal district. The urban-type settlement of Nizhneangarsk serves as the administrative center of both the administrative and municipal district.

== Nature ==
The Barguzin Nature Reserve is located on the territory of the district. The district is also home to the Kholodninsky mine, one of the largest lead and zinc deposits in Russia.
