= Nizhneangarsk =

Nizhneangarsk Нижнеангарск
- Urban-type settlement

Other transcription(s)
  - Buryat: Доодо Ангар
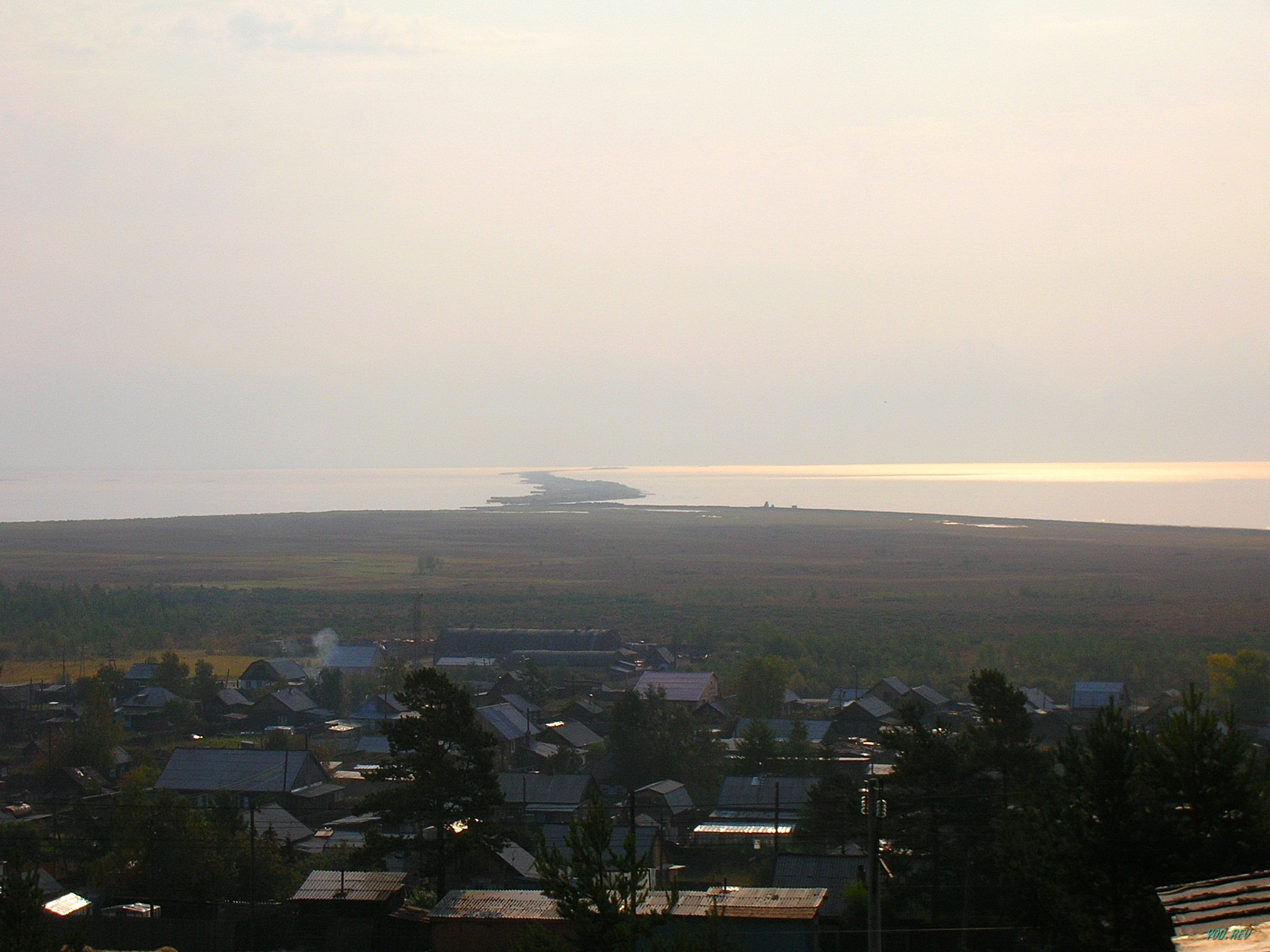
- Interactive map of Nizhneangarsk
- Location of Nizhneangarsk Nizhneangarsk (Republic of Buryatia)
- Coordinates: 55°46′N 109°31′E
- Country: Russia
- Federal subject: Buryatia
- Administrative district: Severo-Baykalsky District
- Urban-type settlementSelsoviet: Nizhneangarsk Urban-Type Settlement
- Founded: 1643
- Elevation: 460 m (1,510 ft)

Population (2010 Census)
  - Total: 5,030
  - Estimate (2025): 3,658 (−27.3%)

Administrative status
  - Capital of: Severo-Baykalsky District, Nizhneangarsk Urban-Type Settlement

Municipal status
  - Municipal district: Severo-Baykalsky Municipal District
  - Urban settlement: Nizhneangarsk Urban Settlement
  - Capital of: Severo-Baykalsky Municipal District, Nizhneangarsk Urban Settlement
- Time zone: UTC+8 (MSK+5)
- Postal codes: 671710, 671739
- OKTMO ID: 81645155051

Nizhneangarsk (Russian: Нижнеанга́рск; Russian Buryat: Доодо Ангар, Doodo Angar; Mongolian: Доод Ангар, Dood Angar) is an urban locality (an urban-type settlement) and the administrative center of Severo-Baykalsky District of the Republic of Buryatia, Russia, located at the northern tip of Lake Baikal, 23 kilometers (14 mi) north of Severobaykalsk. As of the 2010 Census, its population was 5,030.

== History ==
It was founded in 1643 by the Russian explorer Semyon Skorokhod and was originally called Verkhneangarsk (Верхнеанга́рск), after the fort built here by Vasily Kolesnik in 1646. In the 1970s, it was planned to make Nizhneangarsk the headquarters of the western end of the Baikal–Amur Mainline, but the marshy ground made it hard to build large buildings, so the headquarters were moved south to Severobaykalsk.

== Administrative and municipal status ==
Within the framework of administrative divisions, Nizhneangarsk serves as the administrative center of Severo-Baykalsky District. As an administrative division, the urban-type settlement (inhabited locality) of Nizhneangarsk, together with one rural locality (the settlement of Davsha), is incorporated within Severo-Baykalsky District as Nizhneangarsk Urban-Type Settlement (an administrative division of the district). As a municipal division, Nizhneangarsk Urban-Type Settlement is incorporated within Severo-Baykalsky Municipal District as Nizhneangarsk Urban Settlement.

== Transportation ==
Nizhneangarsk is the location of the Nizhneangarsk Airport, with flights to Ulan-Ude and Irkutsk, however, since Bural ceased operations, no flights are made during the winter. The town is also served by the Baikal–Amur Mainline that connects Nizhneangarsk with Severobaikalsk and Tayshet by railway. Train 076Э connects the town with Moscow and runs every two days.

== Demographics ==
In the last decade, Nizhneangarsk has had a decrease in its population: 5,019 (2011), 4,963 (2012), 4,885 (2013), 4,822 (2014), 4,781 (2015), 4,710 (2016) and 4,520 (2017).

Nizhneangarsk population
- 2010 Census: 5,030
- 2002 Census: 5,595
- 1989 Census: 6,977
- 1979 Census: 5,870

== Climate ==
Nizhneangarsk has a subarctic climate (Köppen climate classification Dfc), with severely cold winters and mild summers. However, the climate of Nizhneangarsk is less extreme compared to other regions of eastern Siberia due to the influence of Lake Baikal, which moderates winter sufficiently that permafrost is only sporadic. Precipitation is moderate and is significantly higher in summer than at other times of the year.

Climate data for Nizhneangarsk
Month	Jan	Feb	Mar	Apr	May	Jun	Jul	Aug	Sep	Oct	Nov	Dec	Year
Record high °C (°F)	0.5 (32.9)	2.1 (35.8)	10.3 (50.5)	19.5 (67.1)	27.9 (82.2)	32.0 (89.6)	36.8 (98.2)	32.1 (89.8)	28.0 (82.4)	19.8 (67.6)	7.7 (45.9)	3.5 (38.3)	36.8 (98.2)
Mean daily maximum °C (°F)	−17.3 (0.9)	−14.3 (6.3)	−5.7 (21.7)	3.5 (38.3)	11.5 (52.7)	19.3 (66.7)	22.7 (72.9)	20.8 (69.4)	13.2 (55.8)	3.3 (37.9)	−7.1 (19.2)	−13.5 (7.7)	3.0 (37.5)
Daily mean °C (°F)	−20.9 (−5.6)	−18.9 (−2.0)	−11.3 (11.7)	−1.4 (29.5)	6.0 (42.8)	13.3 (55.9)	17.5 (63.5)	16.1 (61.0)	8.9 (48.0)	−0.2 (31.6)	−10.6 (12.9)	−17.1 (1.2)	−1.5 (29.2)
Mean daily minimum °C (°F)	−24.2 (−11.6)	−23.5 (−10.3)	−16.9 (1.6)	−6.2 (20.8)	1.3 (34.3)	8.4 (47.1)	13.3 (55.9)	12.3 (54.1)	5.3 (41.5)	−3.4 (25.9)	−13.9 (7.0)	−20.4 (−4.7)	−5.7 (21.8)
Record low °C (°F)	−47.3 (−53.1)	−41.9 (−43.4)	−39.7 (−39.5)	−28.8 (−19.8)	−12.6 (9.3)	−2.7 (27.1)	0.4 (32.7)	0.8 (33.4)	−6.2 (20.8)	−23.8 (−10.8)	−31.8 (−25.2)	−39.2 (−38.6)	−47.3 (−53.1)
Average precipitation mm (inches)	16 (0.6)	13 (0.5)	12 (0.5)	21 (0.8)	27 (1.1)	41 (1.6)	60 (2.4)	62 (2.4)	43 (1.7)	34 (1.3)	20 (0.8)	12 (0.5)	359 (14.1)
Average precipitation days (≥ 0.1 mm)	15.1	13.9	10.3	7.3	10.4	9.8	10.9	10.9	12.0	11.5	11.5	11.4	135
Average relative humidity (%)	74.9	74.1	70.9	63.0	62.4	71.1	74.6	72.1	67.6	62.8	64.7	68.1	68.9
Mean monthly sunshine hours	94.6	128.8	186.0	219.0	244.9	265.5	251.1	229.4	171.0	128.6	87.0	77.5	2,083.4
Source: climatebase.ru (1948-2011)
