= Ivolginsk =

Ivolginsk Иволгинск
- Selo
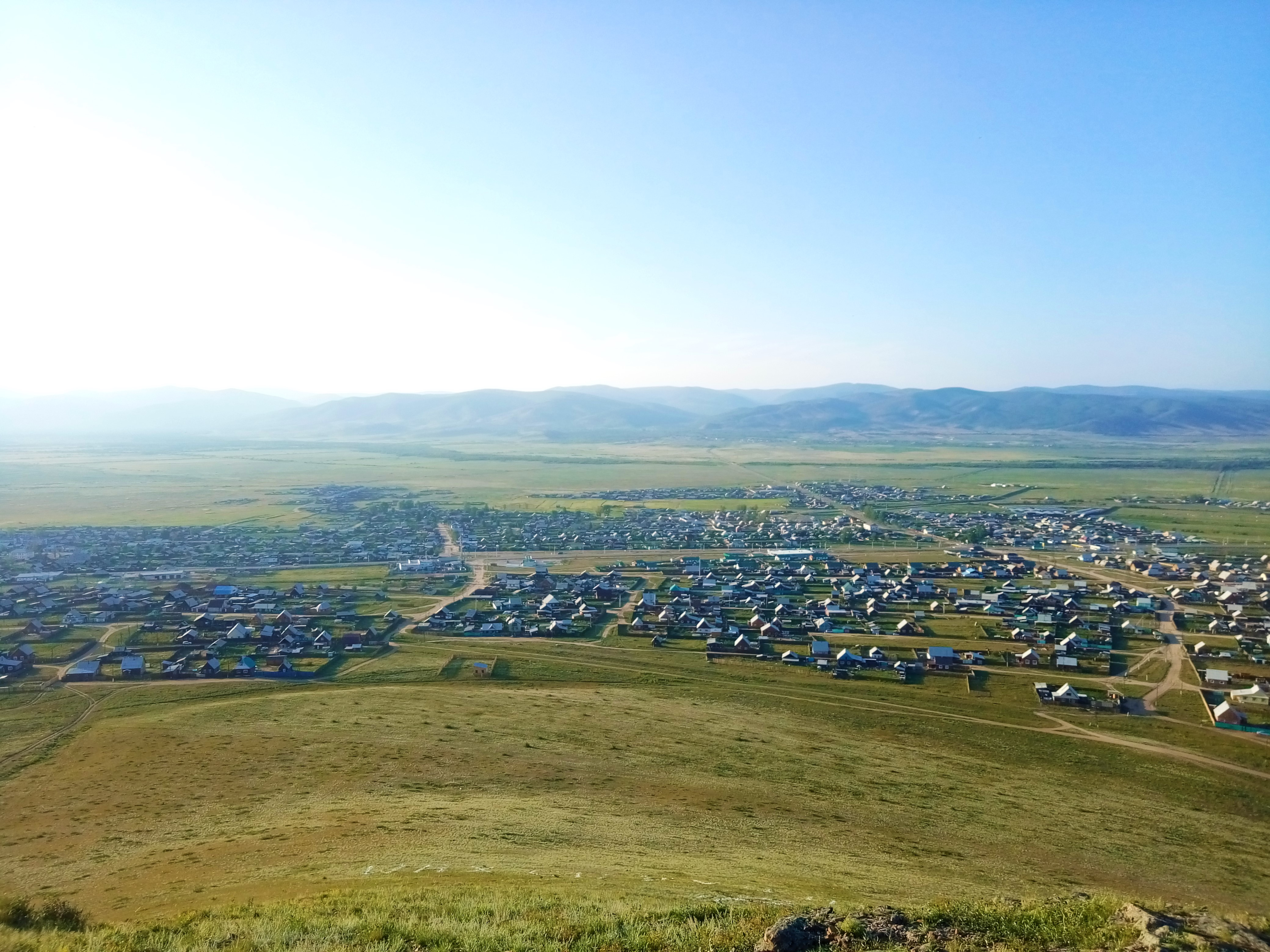
- View of Ivolginsk from the sacred mountain Bayan-Tugad (Bayan-Togod)
- Interactive map of Ivolginsk
- Location of Ivolginsk Ivolginsk (Republic of Buryatia)
- Coordinates: 51°44′28″N 107°17′00″E
- Country: Russia
- Federal subject: Buryatia
- Administrative district: Ivolginsky District
- SelsovietSelsoviet: Ivolginsky

Population (2010 Census)
  - Total: 7,382
  - Estimate (2021): 7,994 (+8.3%)

Administrative status
  - Capital of: Ivolginsky District, Ivolginsky Selsoviet

Municipal status
  - Municipal district: Ivolginsky Municipal District
  - Rural settlement: Ivolginskoye Rural Settlement
  - Capital of: Ivolginsky Municipal District, Ivolginskoye Rural Settlement
- Time zone: UTC+8 (MSK+5)
- Postal code: 671050
- OKTMO ID: 81622420101

Ivolginsk (Russian: Иволги́нск; Buryat: Эбилгэ, Ebilge; Mongolian: Эвлэг, Evleg) is a rural locality (a selo) and the administrative center of Ivolginsky District of the Republic of Buryatia, Russia. Population: 7,382 (2010 census); 7,241 (2002 census); 5,980 (1989 Soviet census).
