= Ivolginsky District =

Ivolginsky District Иволгинский район (Russian)
- District

Other transcription(s)
  - Buryat: Эбилгын аймаг
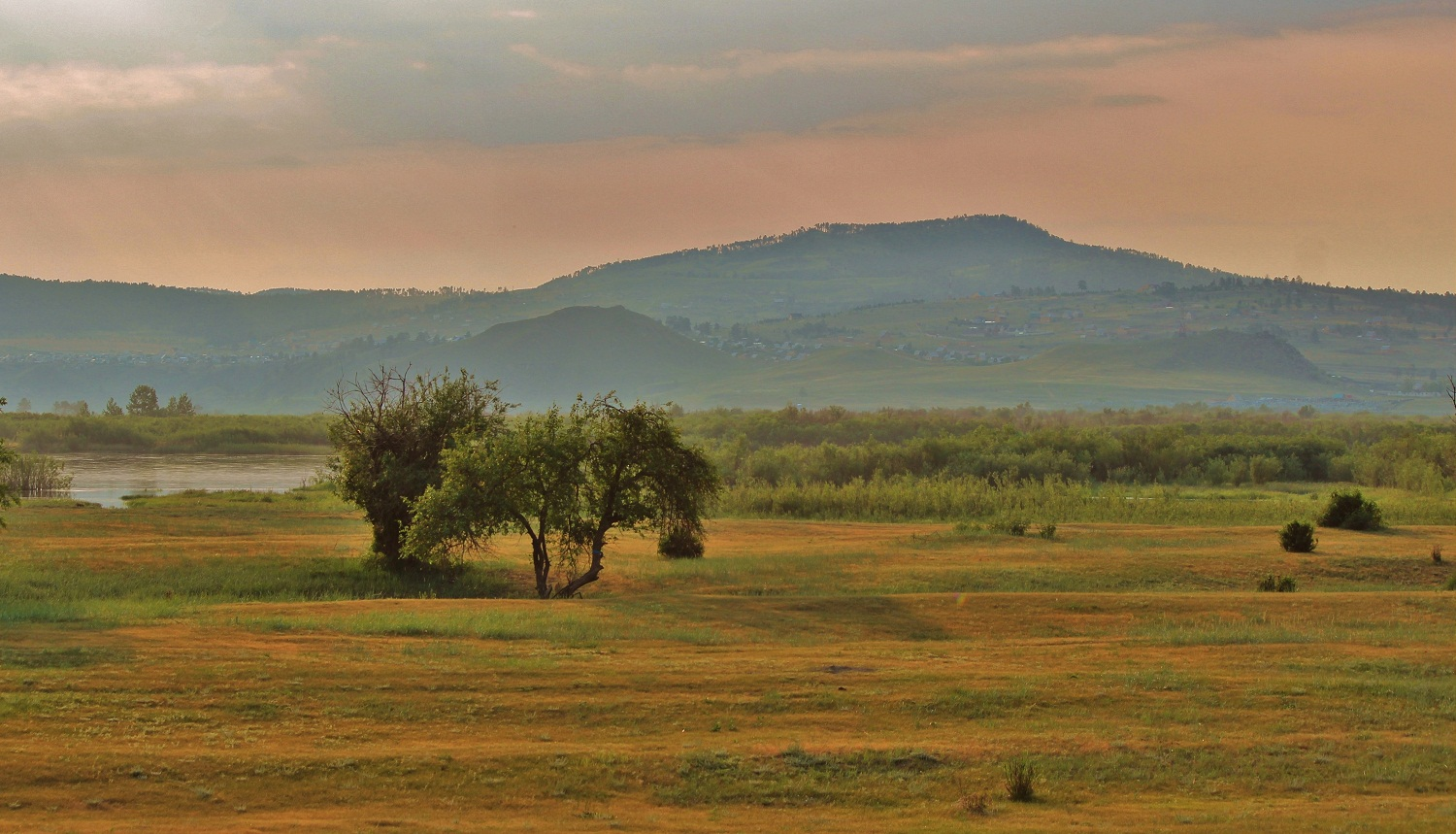
- Ivolginskoye gorodishche, an archaeological site in Ivolginsky District

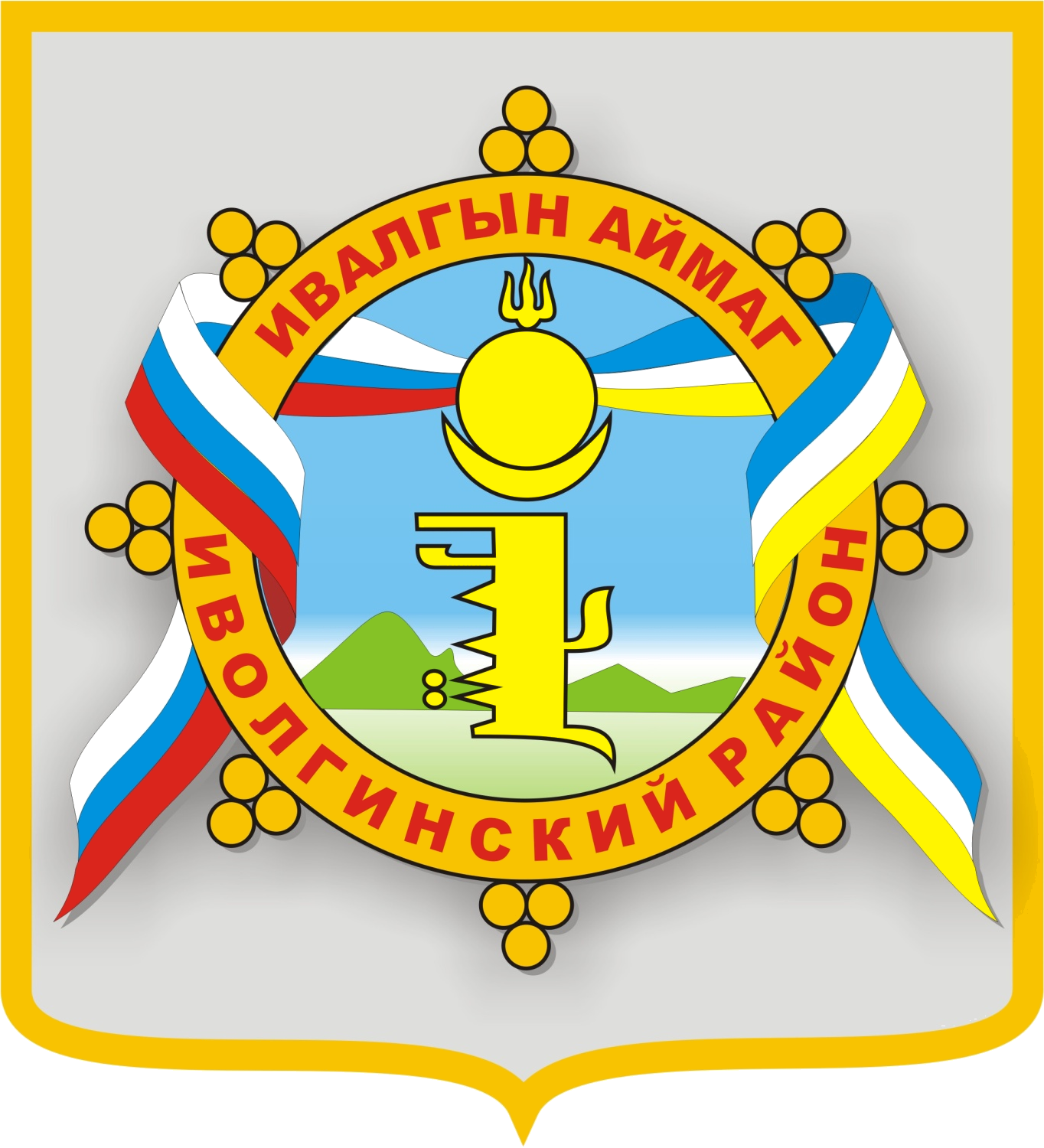
- Flag Coat of arms
- Location of Ivolginsky District in the Buryat Republic
- Coordinates: 51°45′N 107°17′E
- Country: Russia
- Federal subject: Republic of Buryatia
- Established: August 25, 1939 (first), August 1985 (second)
- Administrative center: Ivolginsk

Area
  - Total: 2,660 km^{2} (1,030 sq mi)

Population (2010 Census)
  - Total: 37,983
  - Density: 14.3/km^{2} (37.0/sq mi)
  - Urban: 0%
  - Rural: 100%

Administrative structure
  - Administrative divisions: 4 Selsoviets, 2 Somons
  - Inhabited localities: 28 rural localities

Municipal structure
  - Municipally incorporated as: Ivolginsky Municipal District
  - Municipal divisions: 0 urban settlements, 6 rural settlements
- Time zone: UTC+8 (MSK+5)
- OKTMO ID: 81622000
- Website: http://ivolginsk.info

Ivolginsky District (Russian: Иволги́нский райо́н; Buryat: Эбилгын аймаг, Ebilgyn aimag) is an administrative and municipal district (raion), one of the twenty-one in the Republic of Buryatia, Russia. It is located in the center of the republic. The area of the district is 2,660 square kilometers (1,030 sq mi). Its administrative center is the rural locality (a selo) of Ivolginsk. As of the 2010 Census, the total population of the district was 37,983, with the population of Ivolginsk accounting for 19.4% of that number.

Historical population
Year	Pop.	±%
1939	13,100	—
1979	25,000	+90.8%
1989	24,900	−0.4%
2002	26,736	+7.4%
2010	37,983	+42.1%
2021	64,862	+70.8%
Source: Census data

== Geography ==
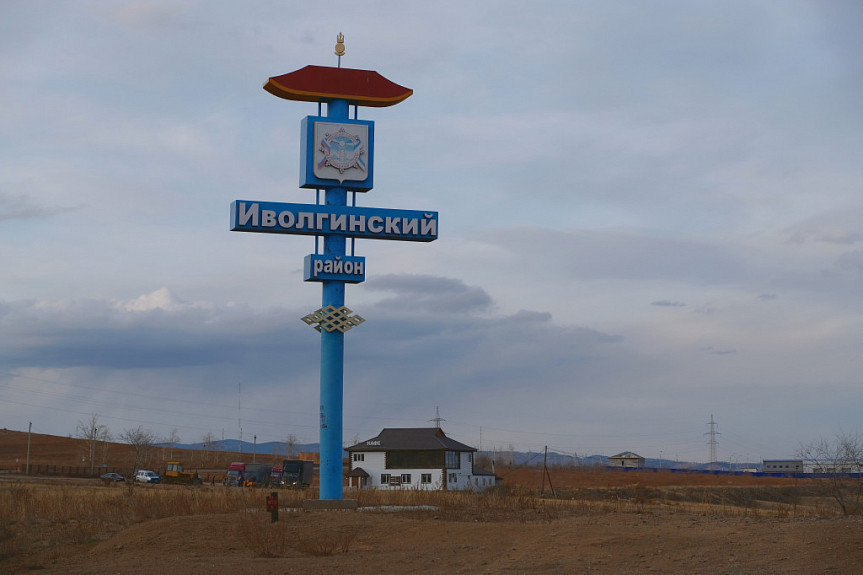
Stele at the entrance to the Ivolginsky district. Buryatia, Russia

The district is located in central Buryatia, mostly on the left bank of the Selenga River, in the geographical region of the Selenga Highlands.

== History ==
The district was first established on August 25, 1939. In 1954, it was split between Selenginsky, Tarbagataysky, and Ulan-Udensky Districts, as well as Sovetsky City District of Ulan-Ude. In August 1985, Ivolginsky District was re-established.

== Administrative and municipal status ==
Within the framework of administrative divisions, Ivolginsky District is one of the twenty-one in the Republic of Buryatia. The district is divided into four selsoviets and two somons, which comprise twenty-eight rural localities. As a municipal division, the district is incorporated as Ivolginsky Municipal District. Its four selsoviets and two somons are incorporated as six rural settlements within the municipal district. The selo of Ivolginsk serves as the administrative center of both the administrative and municipal district.
