= Barguzinsky Bay =

Bay in Buryatia, Russia

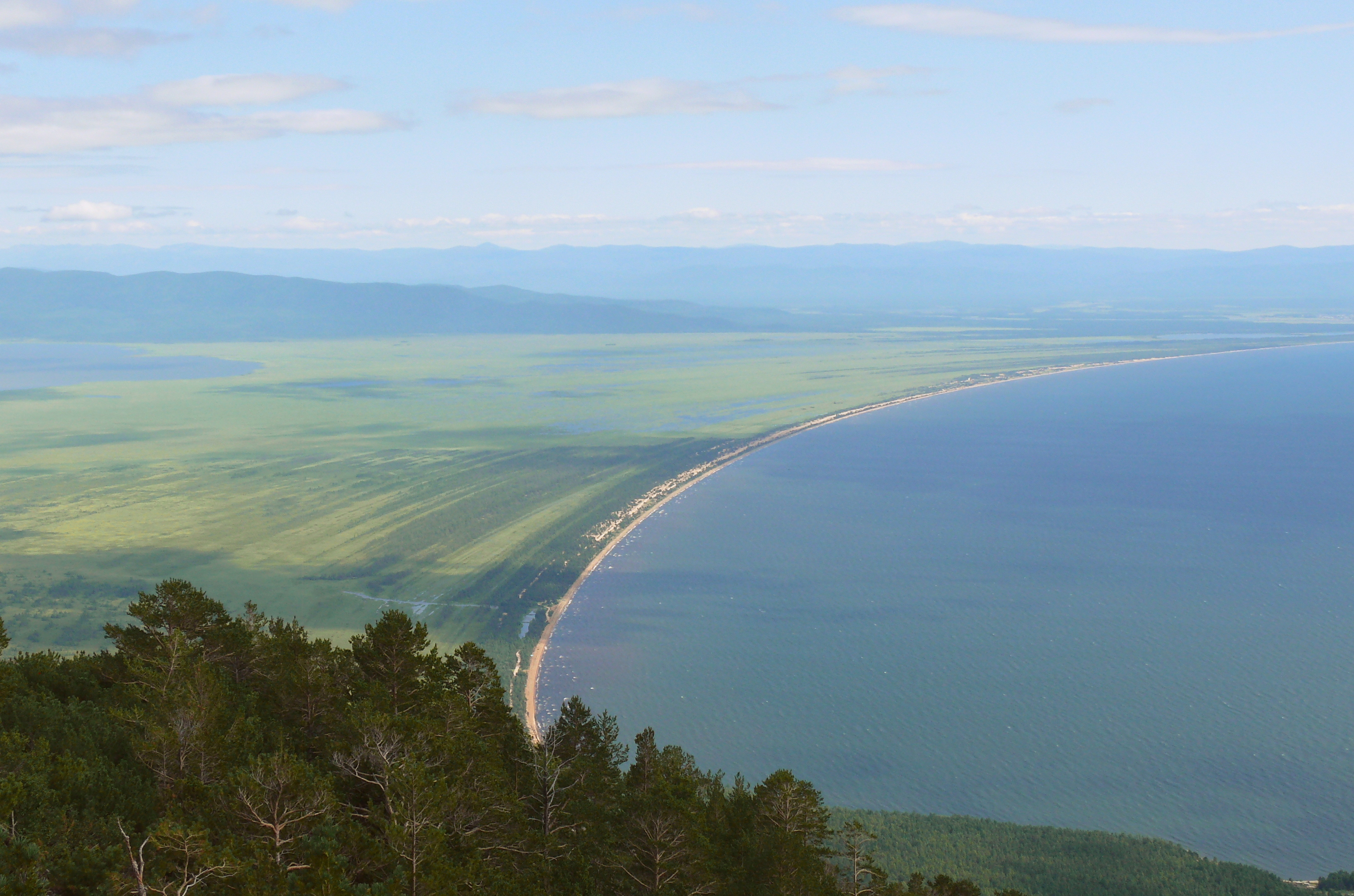
Barguzin Bay's northeast edge and the Chivyrkuisky Isthmus, viewed from the Svyatoy Nos peninsula.

Barguzin Bay (or Barguzinsky Bay) is a branch of Lake Baikal, in the Republic of Buryatia; part of it lies in the Zabaykalsky (Trans-Baikal) National Park. The bay is named after the Barguzin River that flows into it from the eastern side of the lake.

== Geography ==
Barguzinsky Bay is bounded by the mainland on the southeast, the main landmass of Svyatoy Nos Peninsula (the "Holy Nose") on the northwest side, and the Chivyrkuisky Isthmus (that connects the two) on the northeast side. The isthmus separates it from the Chivyrkuisky Bay further to the northeast.

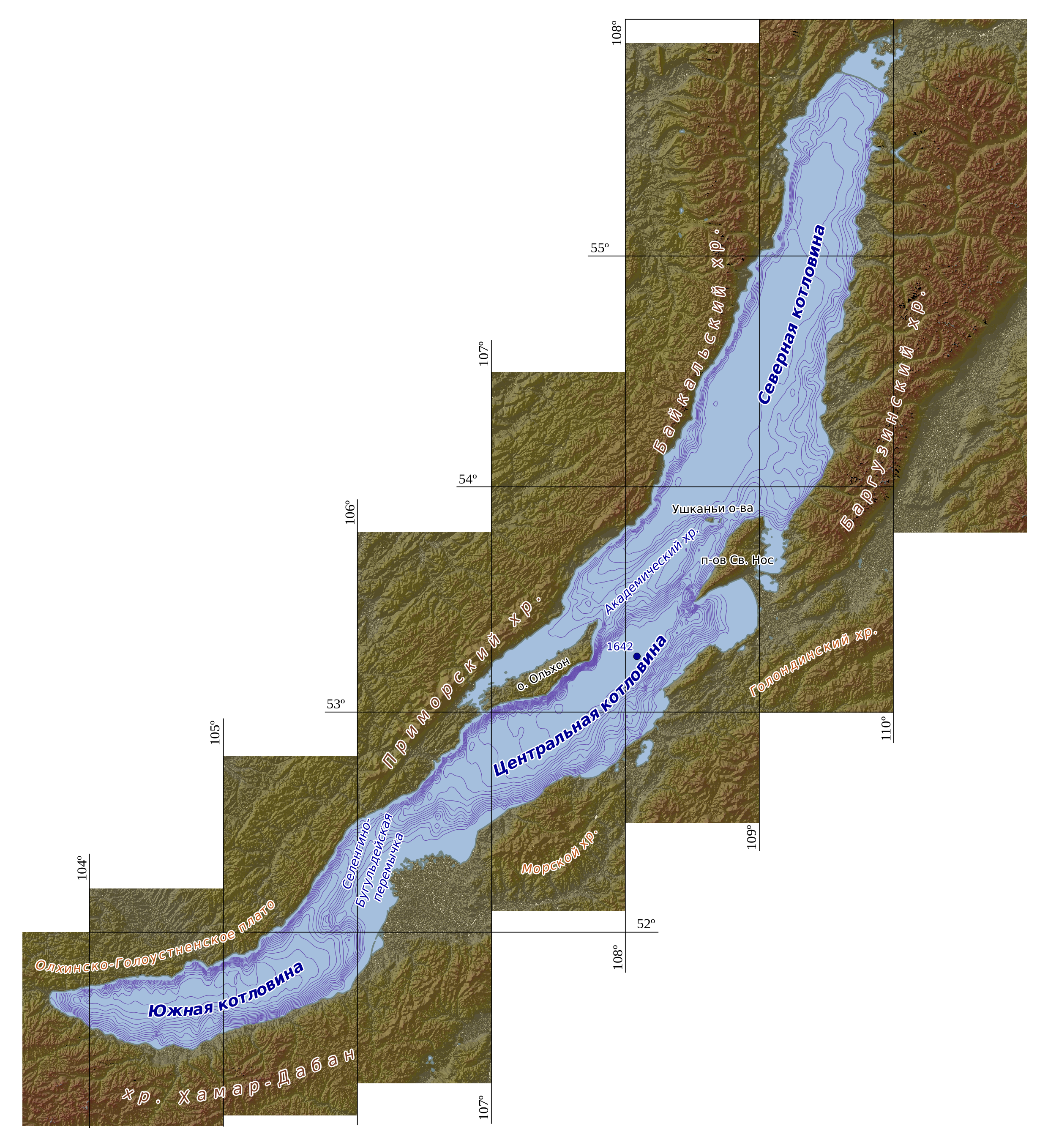
Underwater relief of Barguzinsky Bay.

The bay is roughly diamond-shaped, almost square, with diagonals measuring about 38 km (north-south) and 32 km (east-west). The entrance at the southwest, between the southwest tip of Svyatoy Nos (Cape Lower Head (Нижнее Изголовье) and Cape Krestovy on the mainland, is about 23 km wide. Just beyond the entrance, the bay widens towards the southeast to about 29 km, and then gradually narrows to about 25 km near the isthmus. The water is relatively deep at the entrance, but in the northeast half the bottom is relatively flat at about 50 m or less.

The east side of Cape Krestovy is Krestovaya Bay, with a 1 km long beach. Continuing counterclockwise around the perimeter of Barguzinsky Bay, about 2 km due east there is Cape Buchenkova. Another 2 km to the southeast there is another cape, with Krutaya Bay between the two. Another 1.5 km southeast there is Cape Maksimin (or Gromotukhin). Another 4.5 km due east is Cape Dukhovy; between the two is a broad curved bay with mostly sandy beach, where the town of Maksimikha is located. From Cape Dukhovy the coast runs mostly northeast for a total of about 16 km, with four major capes: Bilyutinsky (4 km from Dukhovy), Zelenyy or Green (3 km from Bilyutinsky), Chernyy or Black (3.5 km from Green) and Kholyanki or Kholodyanki (4.5 km from Chernyy). That part of the coastline is rocky and overlooked by hilly terrain. Cape Kholyanki is a popular ice fishing location because of the relatively colder and deeper water.

About 5 km due east of Cape Dukhovy and 3 km southeast of Cape Bilyutinsky is a shallow 2.5 km by 1.2 km pond, Lake Dukhovoye, that has an outlet about 1.5 km northeast of Cape Dukhovy.

At Cape Kholyanki the coast of Barguzinsky Bay changes direction and character. It runs due north along the Chivyrkuisky Isthmus, curving towards northwest at the end, in a smooth arc 27 km long. The isthmus is a low-lying sandy marshland. That part of the shore is a long sandy beach, broken only by the mouth of the Barguzin River (5.5 km north of Cape Kholodyanki, at 53.4265°N 108.9909°E). The town of Ust-Berguzin is located on the south margin of that river, about 2 km from the lake's shore. This beach is a popular camping, fishing, and boating destination for tourists, as well as the only land way to the "Holy Nose". By late July water temperatures inside the bay close to the shoreline reach 20 – 21 °C; however, due to occasional strong winds from Baikal, currents of cold water may enter the bay and push the warmer waters closer to the shoreline.

The isthmus and its beach end at the foot of the mountainous "Holy Nose". The shoreline turns abruptly to the left, by about 120 degrees, forming the Kultuk Bay. It then runs south by southwest in a slightly concave arc, to Cape Lower Head. A few blunt capes protrude slightly into the bay: Makarova at 6 km from the isthmus (where an intermittent mountain stream of the same name empties into the bay), Bolshoy Makarova at 8 km (the largest one, extending 700 meters into the bay), Osynovy at 10 km, Zelenenky at 14 km, Tolsty at 16 km. That part of the shore is again a narrow strip of large pebbles and rocks, overlooked by steep terrain; except at the very tip of the peninsula.

Road R438 runs along the southeast side of Barguzinsky Bay to Ust-Barguzin, then turns east along the river to the city of Barguzin. A mostly unpaved road branches off R438 just north of the river and follows the shore of the bay, along the isthmus. At the Holy Nose it turns northeast towards Chivyrkuisky Bay. A precarious road branches towards southwest, leading down to Cape Makarova. That is the start of a popular hiking trail that leads up to Mount Markov, the highest point of the Holy Nose.

== Habitation ==
There are two significant towns on the edge of the bay, on the mainland: Maksimikha at the southernmost end and Ust-Barguzin at the easternmost end, just south of the mouth of the Barguzin River.

There are holiday resorts on Krutaya Bay, 1 km southeast of Cape Buchenkova, and about 1 km northeast of Cape Dukhovy. There are a few scattered huts and along the shore, including one on Cape Krestovy at the south end of the entrance and at a place called Glinka on the northwest shore, 1.2 km from the isthmus. A luxury hotel was built at Glinka in 1989, but was destroyed by fire shortly after opening, leaving only the cement and stone foundations.
