= Svyatoy Nos Peninsula, Buryatia =

Land formation in Lake Baikal, Russia

Svyatoy Nos
Святой Нос / Hilmen Hushun
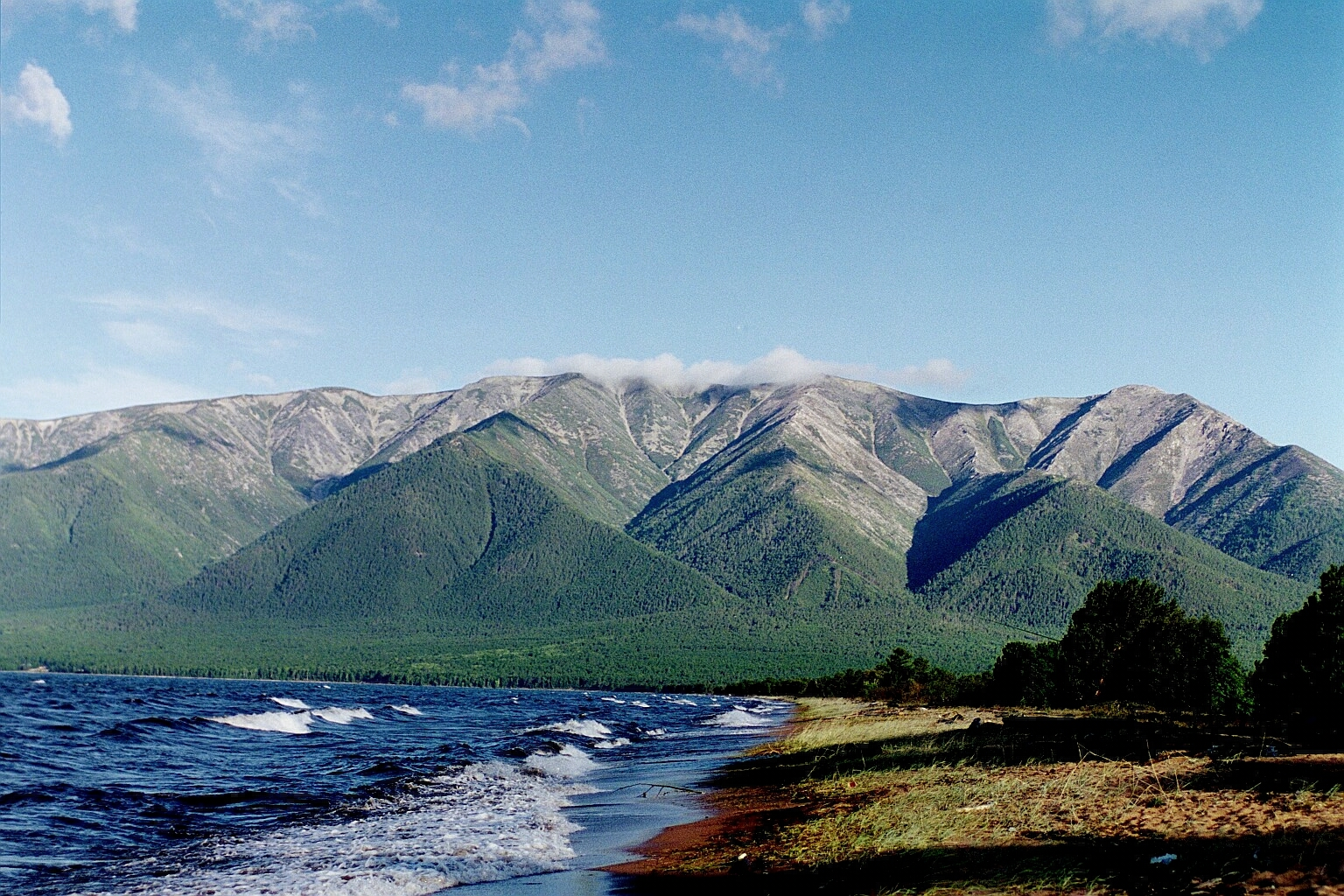
- Panorama of the mountains rising above the lakeshore in Svyatoy Nos

- Location within Republic of Buryatia

Geography
- Coordinates: 53.69°N 108.85°E
- Adjacent to: Lake Baikal
- Length: 56 km (34.8 mi)
- Width: 20 km (12 mi)
- Highest elevation: 1,878 m (6161 ft)
- Highest point: Mount Markova

Administration
- Russia
- Federal Subject: Buryatia

Svyatoy Nos ('Holy Cape') is a large peninsula on the eastern edge of Lake Baikal, Eastern Siberia, in the Barguzinsky District of the Republic of Buryatia. It is part of the Zabaykalsky (Trans-Baikal) National Park.

The name "Svyatoy Nos" (Святой Нос) means 'Holy Cape' in Russian. Russian explorers in the 17th and 18th centuries used the word нос nos in the meaning 'cape' (metaphorically based on 'nose'). The name Svyatoy Nos originally referred to the southwestern cape of the peninsula (Мыс Нижнее Изголовье), and a (now abandoned) village on that cape. Then the name passed on the whole territory of the peninsula. In the Buryat language, the peninsula is called Hilmen Hushun, which means "sturgeon's muzzle."

== Geography ==
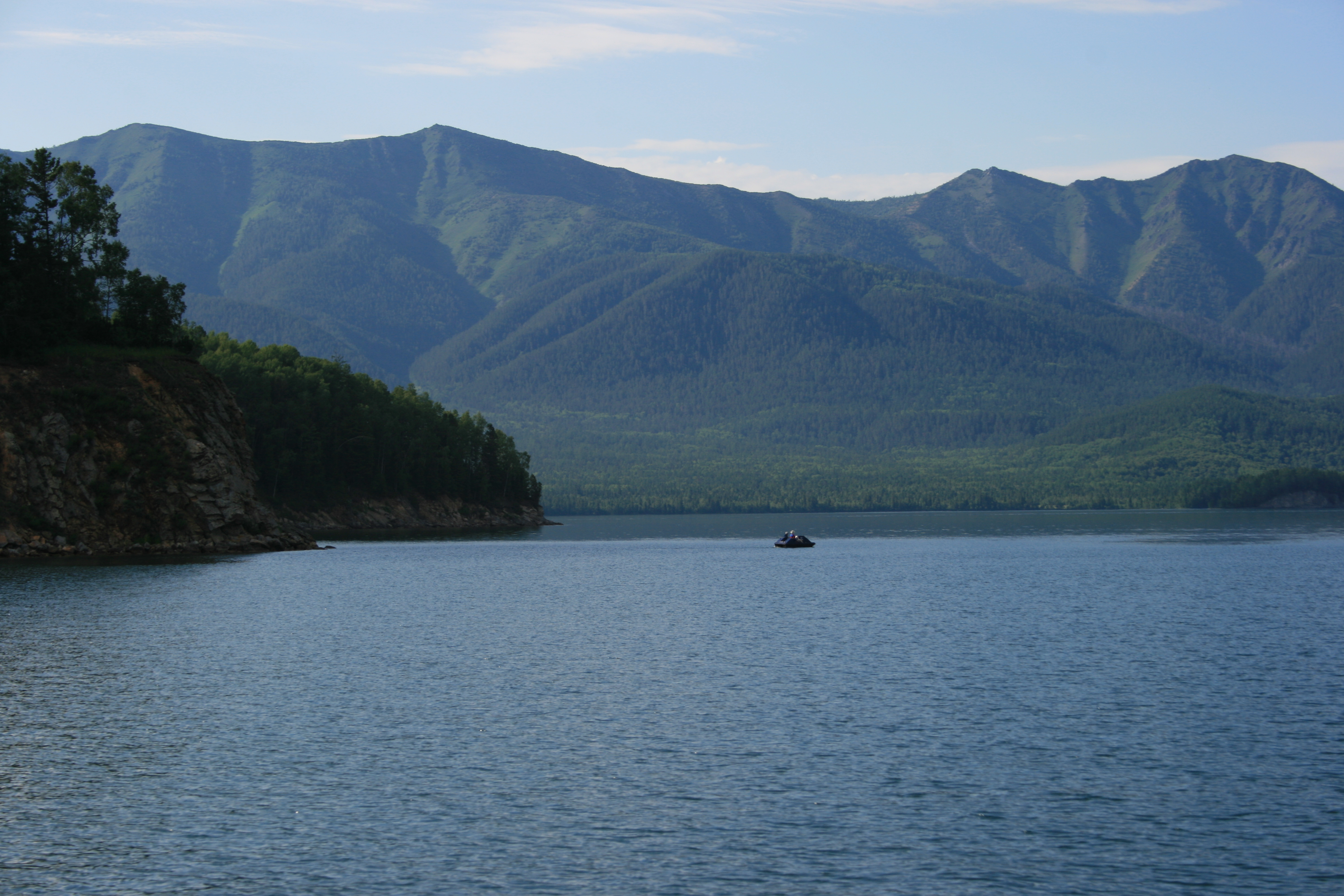
Chivyrkuisky Bay near Snake Bay

The peninsula consists of two very distinct parts: a large rocky mountainous "island" (Svyatoy Nos proper), and a swampy low-lying land bridge, the Chivyrkuisky Isthmus, that connects it to the mainland. Just a few millennia ago, Svyatoy Nos was an island, not connected to the mainland. The isthmus was formed by sediments from the Small Chivyrkuy and Barguzin rivers on the mainland, and dust carried by wind, dividing the strait between the island and the mainland into two bays, Chivyrkuisky Bay at the northeast and Barguzinsky Bay at the southwest.

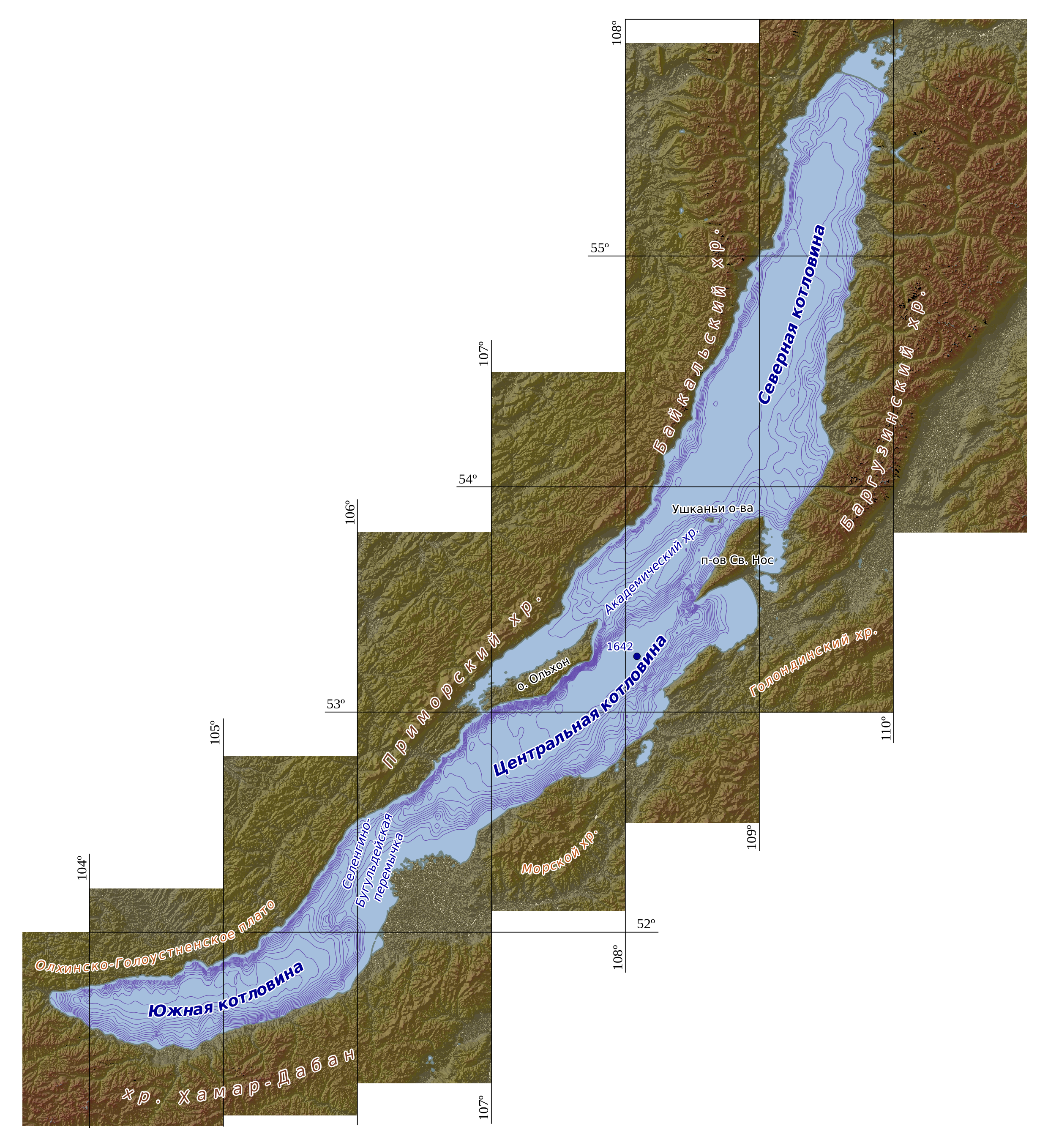
Relief map showing the Academician underwater ridge.

The "island" is spearhead-shaped, 56 km long and 20 km wide, with a sharp tip (at 53.49481°N 108.51728°E) pointing southwest and a blunter point at the other end. A mountain ridge runs the whole length of the island; the highest point is the flat peak of Mount Markova (altitude 1878 m, at 53.6334°N 108.8075°E), a popular hiking destination with a scenic view of most of Lake Baikal.

The west side of the ridge starts with a low cliff all along the shore and then rises towards the crest in a single general slope, cut by many valleys. The eastern side is more irregular, with some flat areas next to the shore in the middle part, and some broad low-lying valleys in the northeast. Snake Bay is a three-pronged 6-km-wide branch of Chivyrkuisky Bay that breaks the outline of the island at that point, pushing the shore 4 km to the west.

The Svyatoy Nos ridge is roughly parallel to the Academician underwater ridge, which separates Lake Baikal into northern and southern basins and rises above the water level at the Ushkan Islands and the Olkhon Island.

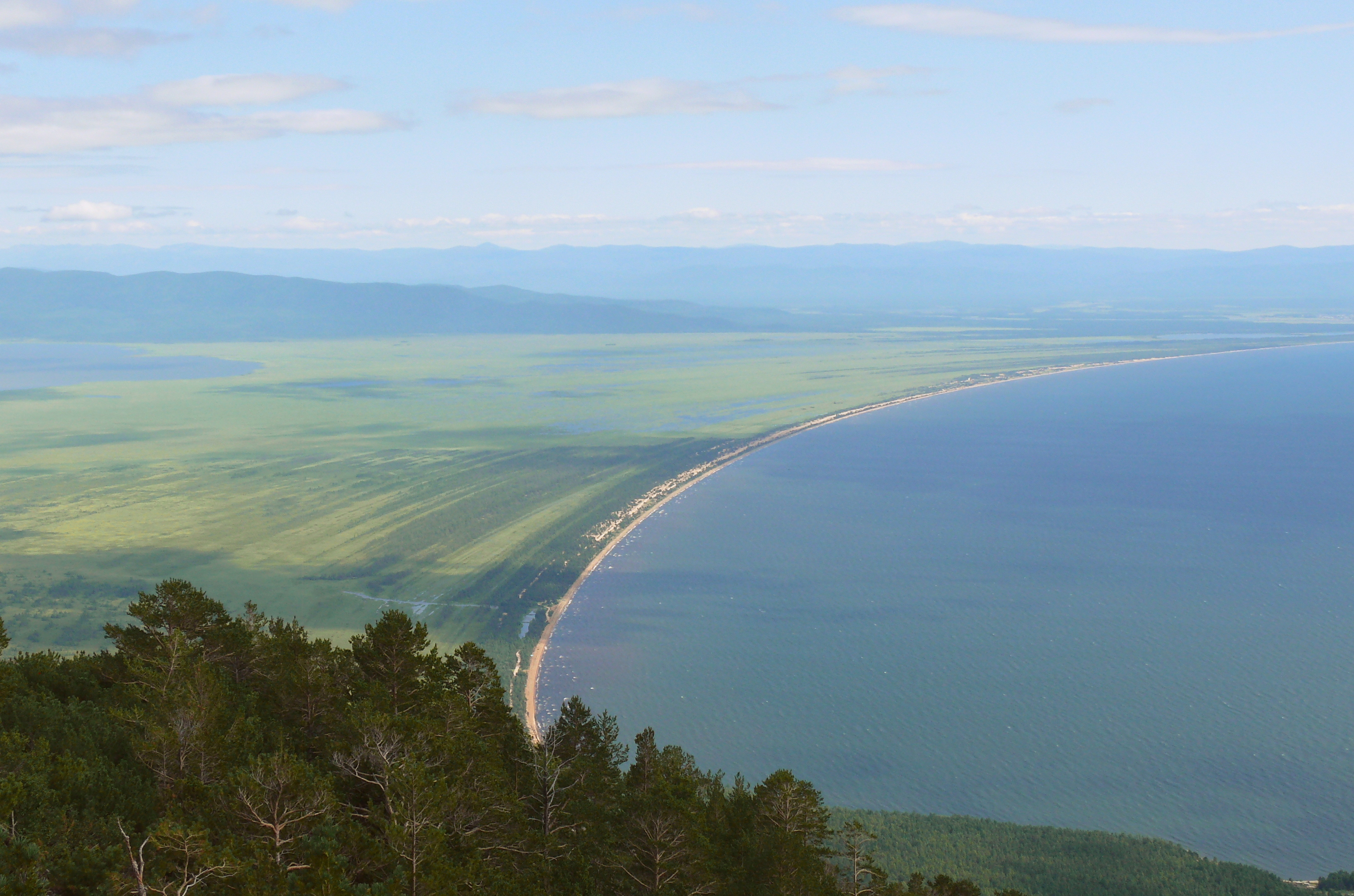
View of Barguzinsky Bay and southwest side of Chivyrkuisky Isthmus from Mount Markov.

A large number of brooks flow down both sides of the ridge. The largest one, the Krestovskaya River, flows into Snake Bay at 53.748370°N 109.04189°E. The Burmuy River runs south-east into Arangatuy Lake on the isthmus. The sand of the Marokov Beach is said be "singing", because of the sound made by walking on it. The peninsula has more than a hundred hydrothermal springs and small mud volcanoes, with various temperatures up to 85 °C. On the isthmus, the springs create many shallow brackish ponds, generally round or oval. The Zmeyevaya sulfurous springs are on the northern end of Snake Bay.

The Big Ushkan Island is located about 10 km northwest of the peninsula. There are seven islands in Chivyrkuisky Bay. The largest and southernmost one is Great Baklany, about 1300 by 160 m, is located about 6 km north of the isthmus, 6 km east of the Svyatoy Nos, and 4 km west of the mainland.

== Flora and fauna ==
The central part of the island belongs to the zone of high-altitude tundra.

The island is forested with birch, larch, pine, and rhododendrons.

== Habitation ==
There are three small settlements on the Peninsula, all on the west shore of Chivyrkuisky Bay. The largest is Kurbulik at 53.70649°N 109.04083°E, with about a hundred people. The other two settlements, further south, are Katun at 53.67772°N 109.02646°E and Monakhovo at 53.66958°N 109.00625°E.

There is also a place called Glinka near the shore of Barguzinsky Bay, about 1 km southwest of the isthmus (53.59576°N 108.84879°E), with some tourist lodging. which is the start of a popular hiking trail to the top of Mount Markov.

The nearest significant town is Ust-Barguzin, located on the mainland shore, at the mouth of the Barguzin River, just south of the isthmus.

There is a road that leads from Ust-Barguzin and follows along the southern shore of the isthmus until the main island. It then splits into a northeast branch that follows the shore of the island, serving the three settlements and continuing until the Zmeyevaya springs. The southwest branch also follows the shore of the island, passing through the Glinka post and continuing until Cape Makarova (53.57872°N 108.78395°E), the starting point of another hiking trail to the top of Mount Markov.

== History ==
The Peninsula was once a cult place of Buryat shamans.

A luxury hotel was built at Glinka in 1989. It was built of wood over a base of stone and cement; however, the wooden structure was destroyed by fire just after it opened, and only the stone base and some marble stairs remain.

In 1981 the Aeroflot Flight 498 on the route Severomuisk to Ulan-Ude crashed into the Svyatoy Nos ridge, at 1300 m altitude, while trying an emergency landing at Ust-Barguzin, killing all 48 people on board. At the time, it was the 30th-worst accident in Russian aviation history.
