= Zabaykalsky =

Zabaykalsky (masculine), Zabaykalskaya (feminine), or Zabaykalskoye (neuter) may refer to:

- Zabaykalsky Krai, a federal subject of Russia
- Zabaykalsky District, a district of Zabaykalsky Krai, Russia
- Zabaykalsky (rural locality) (Zabaykalskaya, Zabaykalskoye), name of several rural localities in Russia
- Zabaykalsky National Park, a national park in the Republic of Buryatia, Russia
