= Uro, Republic of Buryatia =

Uro Уро
- Selo
- Location within Republic of Buryatia Location within Russia
- Coordinates: 53°32′N 109°50′E
- Country: Russia
- Region: Republic of Buryatia
- District: Barguzinsky District
- Time zone: UTC+8:00

Uro (Russian: Уро) is a rural locality (a selo) in Barguzinsky District, Republic of Buryatia, Russia. The population was 1,160 as of 2010. There are 13 streets.

== Geography ==
Uro is located 25 km southeast of Barguzin (the district's administrative centre) by road. Maloye Uro is the nearest rural locality.
