= Zhuravlikha, Republic of Buryatia =

Zhuravlikha Журавлиха
- Settlement
- Location within Republic of Buryatia Location within Russia
- Coordinates: 53°31′N 109°22′E
- Country: Russia
- Region: Republic of Buryatia
- District: Barguzinsky District
- Time zone: UTC+8:00

Zhuravlikha (Russian: Журавлиха) is a rural locality (a settlement) in Barguzinsky District, Republic of Buryatia, Russia. The population was 83 as of 2010. There is 1 street.

== Geography ==
Zhuravlikha is located 22 km southwest of Barguzin (the district's administrative centre) by road. Zorino is the nearest rural locality.
