= Katun, Republic of Buryatia =

Katun Катунь
- Selo
- Location within Republic of Buryatia Location within Russia
- Coordinates: 53°40′N 109°01′E
- Country: Russia
- Region: Republic of Buryatia
- District: Barguzinsky District
- Time zone: UTC+8:00

Katun (Russian: Катунь) is a rural locality (a selo) in Barguzinsky District, Republic of Buryatia, Russia. The population was 185 as of 2010.

== Geography ==
Katun is located 91 km west of Barguzin (the district's administrative centre) by road. Monakhovo is the nearest rural locality.
