= Borogol =

Borogol Борогол
- Ulus
- Location within Republic of Buryatia Location within Russia
- Coordinates: 53°54′N 110°10′E
- Country: Russia
- Region: Republic of Buryatia
- District: Barguzinsky District
- Time zone: UTC+8:00

Borogol (Russian: Борогол; Buryat: Боро гол) is a rural locality (an ulus) in Barguzinsky District, Republic of Buryatia, Russia. The population was 288 as of 2010. There are 3 streets.

== Geography ==
Borogol is located 69 km northeast of Barguzin (the district's administrative centre) by road. Khilgana is the nearest rural locality.
