= Maloye Uro =

Maloye Uro Малое Уро
- Selo
- Location within Republic of Buryatia Location within Russia
- Coordinates: 53°31′N 109°50′E
- Country: Russia
- Region: Republic of Buryatia
- District: Barguzinsky District
- Time zone: UTC+8:00

Maloye Uro (Russian: Малое Уро) is a rural locality (a selo) in Barguzinsky District, Republic of Buryatia, Russia. The population was 178 as of 2010. There are 4 streets.

== Geography ==
Maloye Uro is located 28 km southeast of Barguzin (the district's administrative centre) by road. Uro is the nearest rural locality.
