= Dushelan =

Dushelan Душелан
- Selo
- Location within Republic of Buryatia Location within Russia
- Coordinates: 53°35′N 109°53′E
- Country: Russia
- Region: Republic of Buryatia
- District: Barguzinsky District
- Time zone: UTC+8:00

Dushelan (Russian: Душелан) is a rural locality (a selo) in Barguzinsky District, Republic of Buryatia, Russia. The population was 171 as of 2010. There are 4 streets.

== Geography ==
Dushelan is located 31 km east of Barguzin (the district's administrative centre) by road. Uro is the nearest rural locality.
