= Khilgana =

Khilgana Хилгана
- Ulus
- Location within Republic of Buryatia Location within Russia
- Coordinates: 53°54′N 110°05′E
- Country: Russia
- Region: Republic of Buryatia
- District: Barguzinsky District
- Time zone: UTC+8:00

Khilgana (Russian: Хилгана) is a rural locality (an ulus) in Barguzinsky District, Republic of Buryatia, Russia. The population was 810 as of 2010. There are 8 streets.

== Geography ==
Khilgana is located 65 km northeast of Barguzin (the district's administrative centre) by road. Borogol is the nearest rural locality.
