= Kurbulik =

Kurbulik Курбулик
- Settlement
- Location within Republic of Buryatia Location within Russia
- Coordinates: 53°42′N 109°02′E
- Country: Russia
- Region: Republic of Buryatia
- District: Barguzinsky District
- Time zone: UTC+8:00

Kurbulik (Russian: Курбулик; Buryat: Хγрбэлиг, Khürbelig) is a rural locality (a settlement) in Barguzinsky District, Republic of Buryatia, Russia. The population was 101 as of 2010. There are 3 streets.

== Geography ==
Kurbulik is located 93 km west of Barguzin (the district's administrative centre) by road. Katun is the nearest rural locality.
