= Monakhovo =

Monakhovo Монахово
- Settlement
- Location within Republic of Buryatia Location within Russia
- Coordinates: 53°40′N 109°00′E
- Country: Russia
- Region: Republic of Buryatia
- District: Barguzinsky District
- Time zone: UTC+8:00

Monakhovo (Russian: Монахово) is a rural locality (a settlement) in Barguzinsky District, Republic of Buryatia, Russia. The population was 4 as of 2010.

== Geography ==
Monakhovo is located 87 km west of Barguzin (the district's administrative centre) by road. Katun is the nearest rural locality.
