= Nesterikha =

Nesterikha Нестериха
- Selo
- Location within Republic of Buryatia Location within Russia
- Coordinates: 53°38′N 109°42′E
- Country: Russia
- Region: Republic of Buryatia
- District: Barguzinsky District
- Time zone: UTC+8:00

Nesterikha (Russian: Нестериха) is a rural locality (a selo) in Barguzinsky District, Republic of Buryatia, Russia. The population was 269 as of 2010. There are 4 streets.

== Geography ==
Nesterikha is located 8 km northeast of Barguzin (the district's administrative centre) by road. Barguzin is the nearest rural locality.
