= Khara-Usun =

Khara-Usun Хара-Усун
- Ulus
- Location within Republic of Buryatia Location within Russia
- Coordinates: 53°48′N 110°07′E
- Country: Russia
- Region: Republic of Buryatia
- District: Barguzinsky District
- Time zone: UTC+8:00

Khara-Usun (Russian: Хара-Усун; Buryat: Хара уhан, Khara uhan) is a rural locality (an ulus) in Barguzinsky District, Republic of Buryatia, Russia. The population was 127 as of 2010. There is 1 street.

== Geography ==
Khara-Usun is located 85 km northeast of Barguzin (the district's administrative centre) by road. Soyol is the nearest rural locality.
