= Chivyrkuisky Isthmus =

Land bridge in Russia

Coordinates: 53.565°N 109.021°E

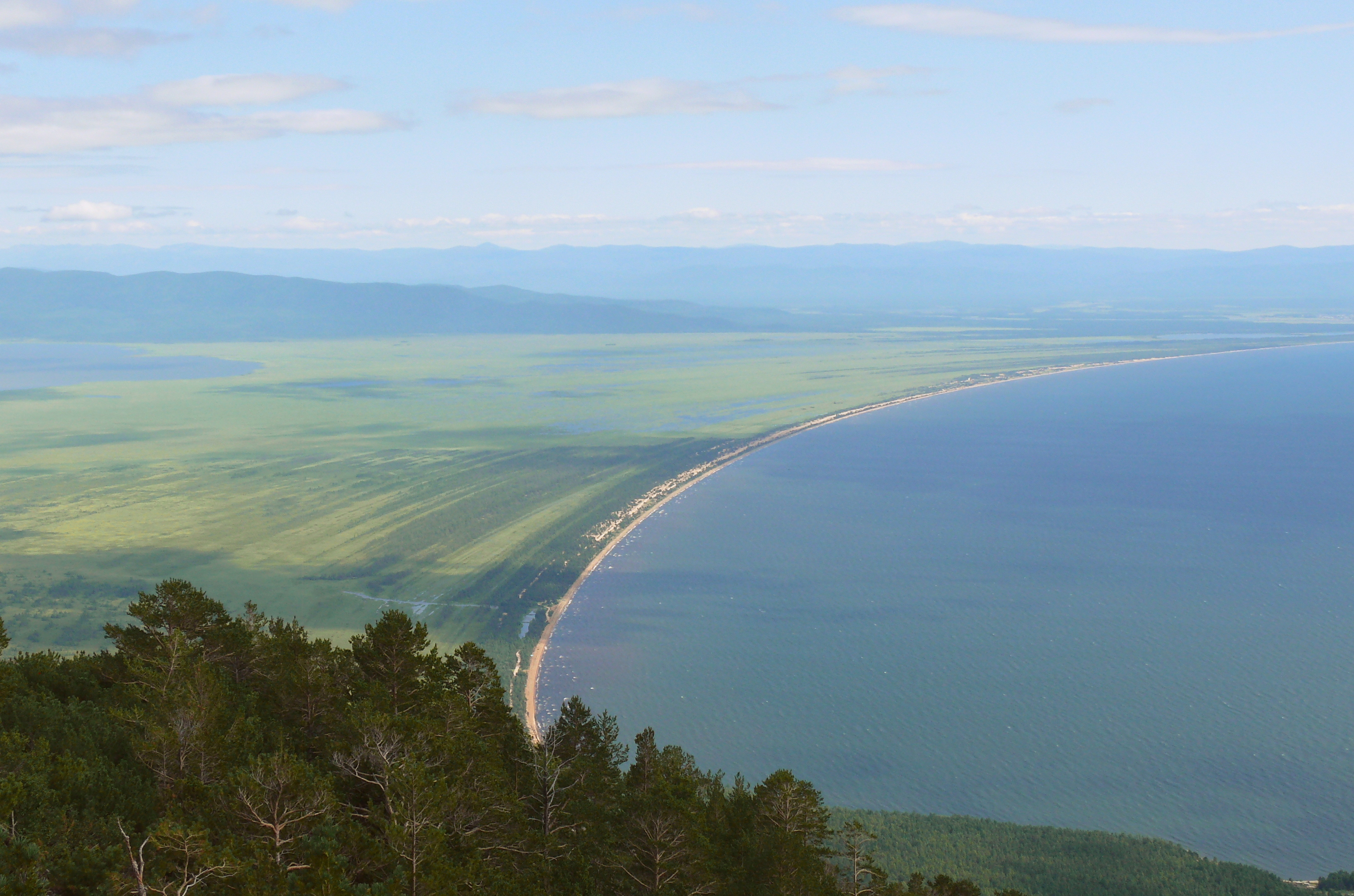
View of Chivyrkuisky Isthmus and Barguzin Bay from the top of the Holy Nose

The Chivyrkuisky Isthmus is a broad land bridge that connects the island-like mountainous part of the Svyatoy Nos ("Holy Nose") peninsula to the eastern shore of Lake Baikal. The isthmus and the "island" are part of the Zabaykalsky (Trans-Baikal) National Park of the Republic of Buryatia.

The isthmus is a roughly trapezoidal region of low-lying swampy terrain, about 15 km long, 24 km wide at the southeast (mainland) end, and 8 km wide at the northwest ("island") end. Both ends are limited by mountainous terrain. The northeast and southwest shores are smooth and gently curved inward, about 11 and 20 km long, respectively. The southwest shore of the isthmus ends next to the town of Ust-Barguzin. The isthmus divides the strait between the island and the mainland into two bays, Chivyrkuisky Bay at the northeast and Barguzinsky Bay at the southwest.

Thousands of years ago the isthmus did not exist, and Svyatoi Nos was an island. It was created by alluvial sediments of the Barguzin River.

Chivyrkuisky Isthmus is one of the three nesting areas of Baikal's waterfowl and birds of prey. It is an unusual alternation of sand bars and coastal marshes, showing species of mountainous and steppe vegetation growing side by side. Some trees like bird cherry and common pines grow close to ground, as creeping bush. Sand levees stretch for many kilometers along the banks of the isthmus.

The isthmus is almost divided in two by a shallow body of water, Lake Arangatuy (or Bol'shoy Sor), measuring about 13 by 7 km and about 54 km^{2} of area. The lake is fed on the eastern side by streams from the mainland, and its outlet is near the north corner of the isthmus, near the "island", just east of the small village of Monakhovo - Zmeyevaya. The lake and its bays are inhabited by dace, perch, pike, and other types of fish. Many rare bird species nest on its shores: whooper swan, black-throated loon, Eurasian curlew, and others.

The southwest side of the isthmus is a beach of exceptionally clean sand, Myagkaya Karga. The road leading to the Svyatoi Nos crosses the isthmus parallel to the beach.

The Kulina marshes have about 120 mud volcanoes (gryphons) and hydrothermal springs, on land and underwater, scattered over about 40 km^{2}. The waters may be up to 80 °C, and contain high levels of dissolved salts and other chemicals, up to 3 g/L – chiefly sodium sulfate, chloride, and fluoride, as well as silicic acid. The gryphons range in diameter from 20 cm to 7 m, and are responsible for many small shallow warm brackish ponds, round or oval, with depths ranging from 0.5 to 5.0 m, and areas from 10 to 300 m^{2}, whose level may be up to 1 meter above or below the level of Lake Baikal. The largest ones cover up to 2500 m^{2}. The springs also form wam rivers that rarely or never freeze in winter. The main group of those hydrothermal-fed lakes, which includes Lake Bormashov, near the mouth of the Barguzin river. The waters and bottom mud (sapropel) are reputed to have health properties.

Until recently, the settlement Kulinoe, Buryatia was located near an active mud volcano. Due to the threat of gas poisoning and livestock poisoning by the salty water, residents were forced to relocate.
