= Ulyun =

Ulyun may refer to:

- Ulyun River, a river in Russia, a tributary of the Barguzin River
- Ulyun (rural locality), a rural locality (a ulus) in the Republic of Buryatia, Russia
