= Barantsevo =

Barantsevo Баранцево
- Village
- Location within Bashkortostan Location within Russia
- Coordinates: 54°41′N 56°20′E
- Country: Russia
- Region: Bashkortostan
- District: Iglinsky District
- Time zone: UTC+5:00

Barantsevo (Russian: Баранцево) is a rural locality (a village) in Kaltymanovsky Selsoviet, Iglinsky District, Bashkortostan, Russia. The population was 85 as of 2010. There are 3 streets.

== Geography ==
Barantsevo is located 21 km south of Iglino (the district's administrative centre) by road. Bibakhtino is the nearest rural locality.

== See also ==
- Barantsev
