= Alexei Barantsev =

Russian businessman (b. 1959)

- Born: Alexei Georgievich Barantsev; 1959 (age 66–67); Ust-Barguzin, Buryat Autonomous Soviet Socialist Republic, Russian Soviet Federative Socialist Republic, USSR
- Occupations: businessman, metallurgist
- Years active: 1985 -
- Known for: GAZ president, Rusal Engineering and Construction Department Head

Alexei Georgievich Barantsev (Russian: Алексей Георгиевич Баранцев; born 1959 in Ust-Barguzin) is a Russian metallurgy businessman, the former CEO of Krasnoyarsk and Bratsk Aluminium Smelters and GAZ Group, the current Engineering and Construction Department Head in Rusal, Honoured Metallurgist of Russian Federation.

== Biography ==
He was born in 1959 in Ust-Barguzin and graduated from Irkutsk Polytechnics Institute as metallurgy engineer. He began his career in 1985 in Tajikistan Aluminium Smelter, in 1991 he moved to Bratsk Aluminium Smelter, where he had been working until 1998. He hold the posts of the Logistics Department Deputy Head in Production and Technological Equipment Management, the electroplating workshop no. 2 foreman (since 1994) and Technical Director (since 1996).

From August till October 1998 he hold the post of Krasnoyarsk Aluminium Smelter Executive Director, since October 1998 till May 2000 he was its CEO. In July 2000 he became the CEO of Bratsk Aluminium Smelter and hold the post till June 2002. Since February 2002 he was the CEO Deputy of Russian Aluminium Management common-stock company construction questions. Later he studied management in the UK and had the internship in France as top manager, since July 2002 First Deputy of the GAZ Group CEO (since August 2002 the CEO).

In October 2005 he became the CEO Deputy in RusPromAvto LLC, later he was the Executive Director Deputy. Since mid-2006 the first deputy of the board chairman in Nizhny Novgorod branch of RusPromAvto (GAZ Group). In January 2007 he became the Avtokomponenty Division Head, later he was the GAZ Group Production and Restructurization Director and first deputy of its board chairman. Since July 2007 he was the Operational Activity Development Director. In 2008 he became the First Deputy of Russkiye Mashiny public joined-stock company CEO, in 2008—2011 he was Glavstroy-Management and PSK Transstroy CEO. Since end of May 2012 he has been holding the post of Rusal Engineering and Construction Department Head, being responsible for effectiveness of fixing activity management, project control, modernisation and new technologies introduction, also he is a professor of Irkutsk Technical University.

He is married and has children.

== Awards ==
- Honoured Metallurgist of Russian Federation (12 July 2000)
- Order of Honour (17 August 2007)
- Order for Merit to Sverdlovsk Oblast III class (19 February 2018)
- All-Russia Exhibition Centre award
- Member of Russian Union of Industrialists and Businessmen
- Peter the Great National Public Prize (17 December 2001)
- Honoured professor of Irkutsk National Research Technical University (6 November 2003)
- Russian National Olympus award "For Honour and Valor" (12 March 2004)
- International Prize Gold Star and order "For the Fidelity to Duty" (September 2004)
- Top-10 Russian association managers member (2004)
- Commemorative Medal "For the Merits in the Russian Competitiveness Management"
- Badge "For the Merits in Ecology"
- Nizhny Novgorod Award for the development and the introduction of GAZ production system
- Diploma "Volga Region Business Leader", category "Automobile Industry"

== Sources ==
- Profile at Avtozavodsk District Library (in Russian)
- Profile at Adposium (in Russian)
