= Barantsev =

Barantsev (masculine, Russian: Баранцев) or Barantseva (feminine, Russian: Баранцева) is a Russian surname. Notable people with the surname include:

- Alexei Barantsev (born 1959), Russian businessman
- Daniil Barantsev (born 1982), Russian ice dancer.
- Denis Barantsev (born 1992), Russian ice hockey player
