= Ulyun (rural locality) =

Ulyun Улюн
- Ulus
- Location within Republic of Buryatia Location within Russia
- Coordinates: 53°49′N 109°54′E
- Country: Russia
- Region: Republic of Buryatia
- District: Barguzinsky District
- Time zone: UTC+8:00

Ulyun (Russian: Улюн) is a rural locality (an ulus) in Barguzinsky District, Republic of Buryatia, Russia. The population was 1,061 as of 2010. There are 18 streets.

== Geography ==
Ulyun is located 32 km northeast of Barguzin (the district's administrative centre) by road. Ulyukchikan is the nearest rural locality.
