= Zabaykalsky National Park =

Nature reserve in Buryatia, Russia

Zaybaykalsky National Park
- Russian: Забайкальский (Also: Trans-Baikal)
- IUCN category II (national park)
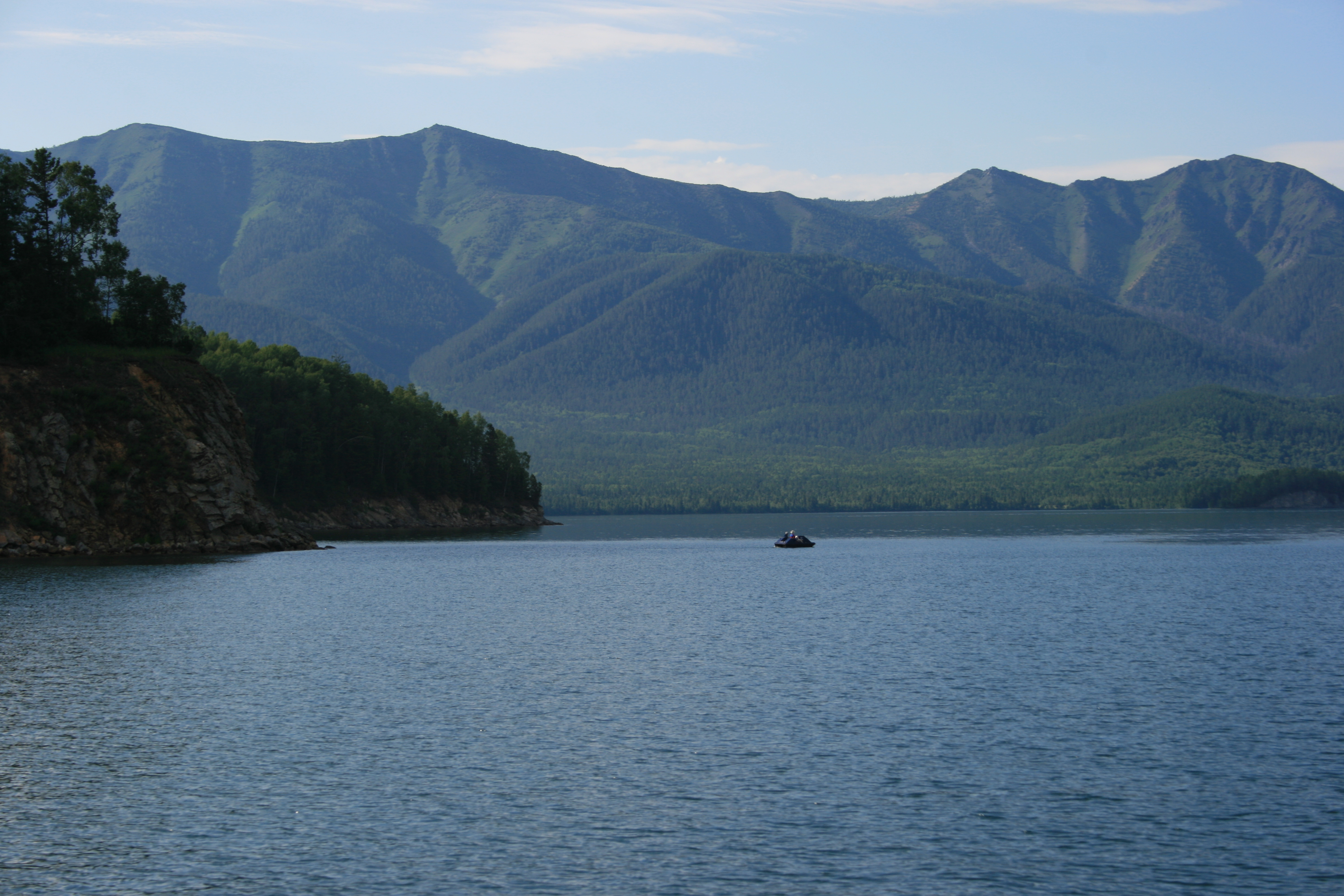
- Chivyrkur Bay, Buryatia

- Location within Russia
- Location: Buryatia
- Nearest city: Ulan-Ude
- Coordinates: 53°43′N 109°13′E
- Area: 269,000 hectares (664,713 acres; 1,039 sq mi)
- Established: 1986
- Governing body: Ministry of Natural Resources and Environment (Russia)
- Website: http://zapovednoe-podlemorye.ru/

Zaybaykalsky National Park (Russian: Забайкальский национальный парк) (in English, "Trans-Baikal") covers the middle section of the eastern shore of Lake Baikal, the west slope of the Barguzin mountains to the east, the Ushkany Islands, and the only large peninsula on the lake, Svyatoy Nos ("Holy Nose"). Of the 2,690 km^{2} (1,040 sq mi) of the park, 38.8 km^{2} are protected water areas of the lake itself.

== Topography ==
Zaybaykalsky is bounded on the west by the shores of Lake Baikal, on the north by the Barguzin Nature Reserve (a strictly protected 'zapovednik' nature reserve of about the same size as Zaybaykalsky), and on the south and east by the Barguzin mountain range. The highest point in the park is Mt. Barmashovoe, at 2,376 metres (7,795 ft).

The park is, above all, steep. 55% of the park is on a slope of more than 26°, and an additional 28% is between 16° and 25°.

The Svyatoy Noy peninsula is 53 km long and 35 km wide, with its own mountain complex, the highest peak of which is 1877 meters above sea level and 1422 meters above the lake. The island mountains are forested with birch, larch, pine, and rhododendron. It has several dozen mountain streams and springs, and is connected to the mainland by the Chivyrkuisky isthmus. The island is known for its views of the lake (allowing a high central viewpoint to see mountains ranges across the water on all sides), and for its "singing sand" Marokov beach, so-called because of the sound made by walking on it.

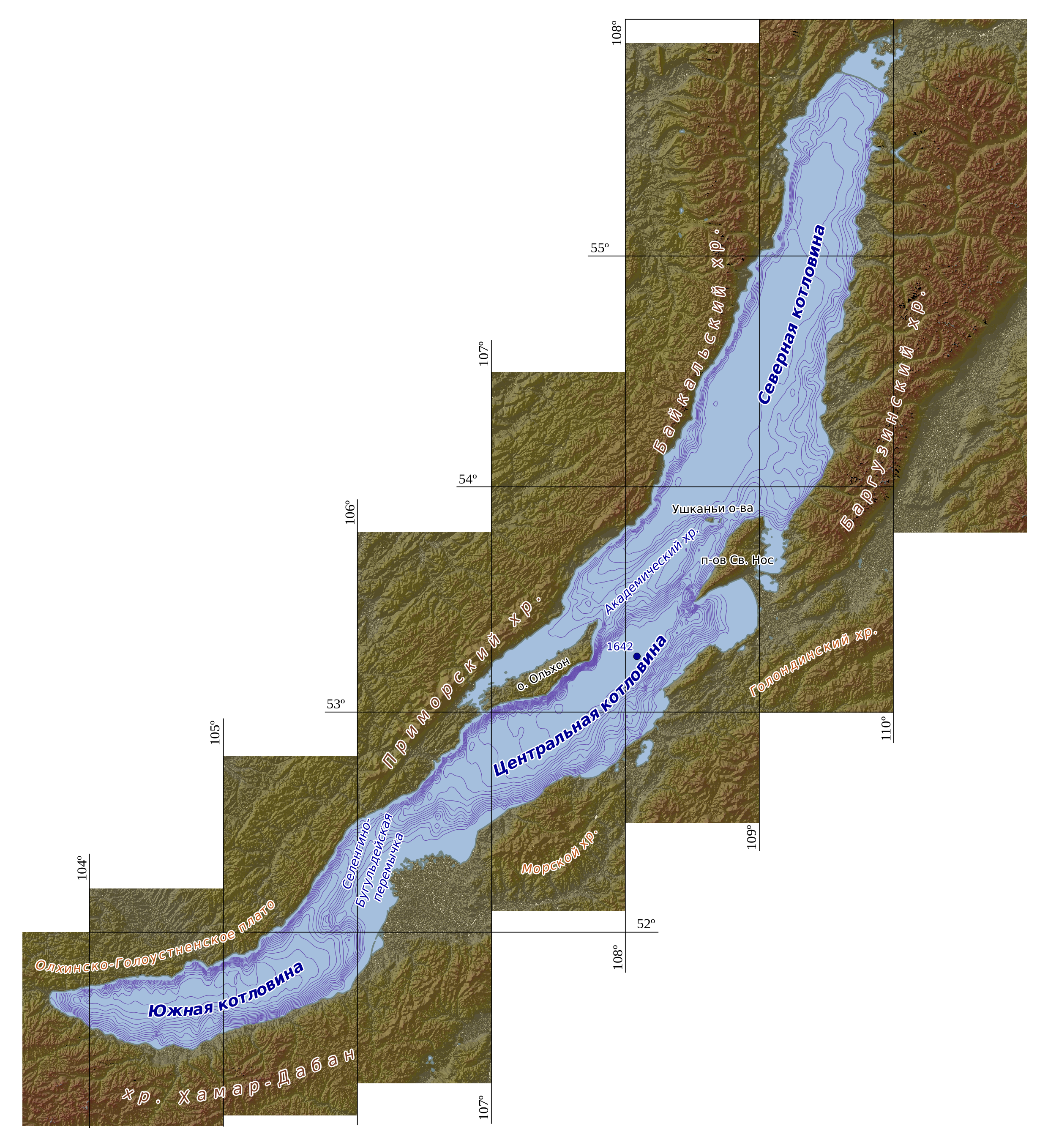
Holy Nose peninsula (right), is connected underwater by Academician Ridge to Olkhon Island to the southwest. Click to see full lake relief map.

The Ushkany Islands, in the middle of the lake but part of Zaybaykalsky park, are the above-water eastern end of the submerged Academician Ridge, which separates Lake Baikal into northern and southern basins. The western shore of the lake sees the Academic ridge rise again above the water in the form of Olkhon Island, which is part of Pribaykalsky National Park. The Ushkany are an archipelago of four islands totaling 10 km^{2} in area. They are famous as the central home of the Baikal seal. The islands are marble and limestone and contain caves with evidence of human habitation from the Neolithic age.

== Ecoregion and climate ==
Zaybaykalsky is located in the East Siberian taiga ecoregion (WWF ID #601). This ecoregion is situated between the Yenisei and Lena Rivers. Its northern border reaches the Arctic Circle, and its southern border reaches 52°N latitude. The dominant vegetation formation is light coniferous taiga with Larix gmelini forming the canopy in areas with low snow cover. This ecoregion is rich in minerals.

The climate at Zaybaykalsky is subarctic with dry winters (Köppen climate classification Dwc). This climate is characterized by long, very cold winters and cool summers, but with little snow in winters. The lake has a somewhat moderating effect on Zaybaykalsky—average January temperatures are –18 °C, while average July temperatures are 23 °C. Temperatures in the mountain values may be a few degrees colder. Annual precipitation averages 450 mm on the shore of the lake to 550 mm in the mountains. Prevailing winds are from the south and southwest.

Lake Baikal, Buryatia, Russia

Climate chart (precipitation, max. and min. temperature)
J	F	M	A	M	J	J	A	S	O	N	D
1.3 −9 −28	0.9 0 −23	1 21 −5	1.1 40 18	1.3 57 32	1.8 71 44	2 75 52	1.7 70 48	1.5 56 35	1.7 38 19	1.5 15 −3	1.4 −3 −21
- █ Average max. and min. temperatures in °F
- █ Precipitation totals in inches
- Source: GlobalSpecies.org
Metric conversion
J	F	M	A	M	J	J	A	S	O	N	D
33 −23 −34	23 −18 −31	25 −6 −21	28 5 −8	33 14 0	46 21 7	51 24 11	43 21 9	38 13 1	43 3 −7	38 −9 −19	36 −19 −29
- █ Average max. and min. temperatures in °C
- █ Precipitation totals in mm

== Flora ==
Because of the sharp grades from the lake shore to mountain tops, the forests of Trans-Baikal display strong altitude zoning in the tree cover. The forests are mostly conifers of the Eastern Siberian taiga in nature: 34% of the forests are pine (Pinus sylvestris), 30% is Siberian dwarf pine (Pinus pumila), 14% are Siberian pine (Pinus sibirica), and 9% are larch (Larix gmelmii). Approximately 10,000 hectares (25,000 acres) are in old growth stands.

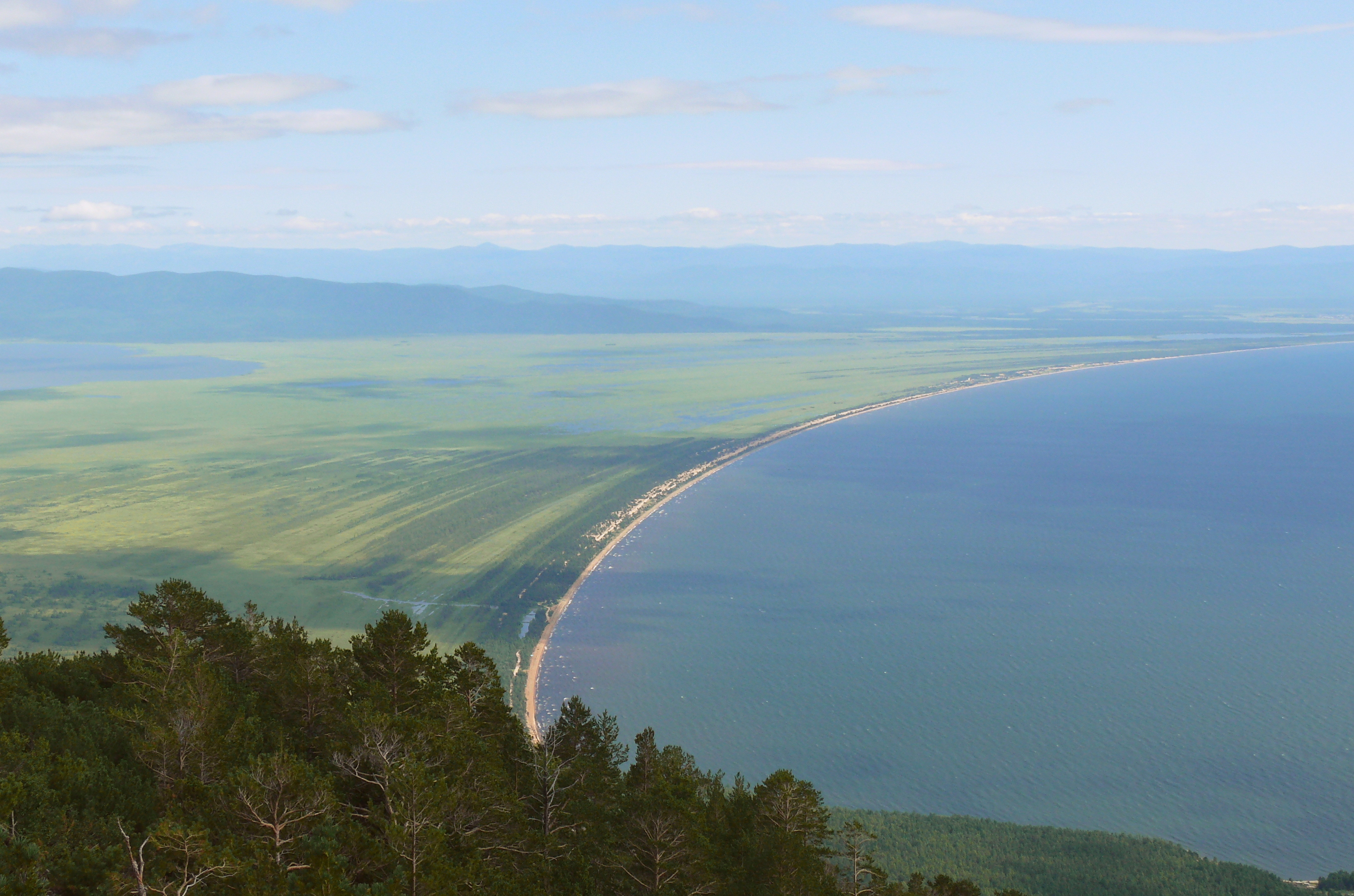
View of Chivyrkuisky Isthmus and Barguzin Bay from the top of the Holy Nose

== Fauna ==
The forest animals of the park are typical of the southern Siberian forest: bear, wolf, fox, lynx, sable, otter, wolverine, moose, musk deer, squirrel, chipmunk, muskrat, and hare. In the alpine meadows, one of the mammals is the black-capped marmot. 249 species of birds have been recorded in the territory. The great cormorant, once exterminated from the region, has returned. During the summer, up to 3,000 Baikal seals at a time congregate on the rocks of the Ushinsky islands. On a smaller scale, Bolshoy Ushinsky island is known for the greatest concentration of large anthills in Russia - thousands that rise up to 1.5 meters in height.

== Tourism ==
Tourism is encouraged, although certain highly sensitive areas—such as the Ushkan Islands—require special permits and strict controls. For the wide variety of hiking and recreational sites within the park, a day pass may be purchased at the entrance. In the winter, ice fishing is permitted, as is cross-country skiing on the ice along the shore. There are guest cabins on the territory, and park management runs a floating ecotourist hostel.

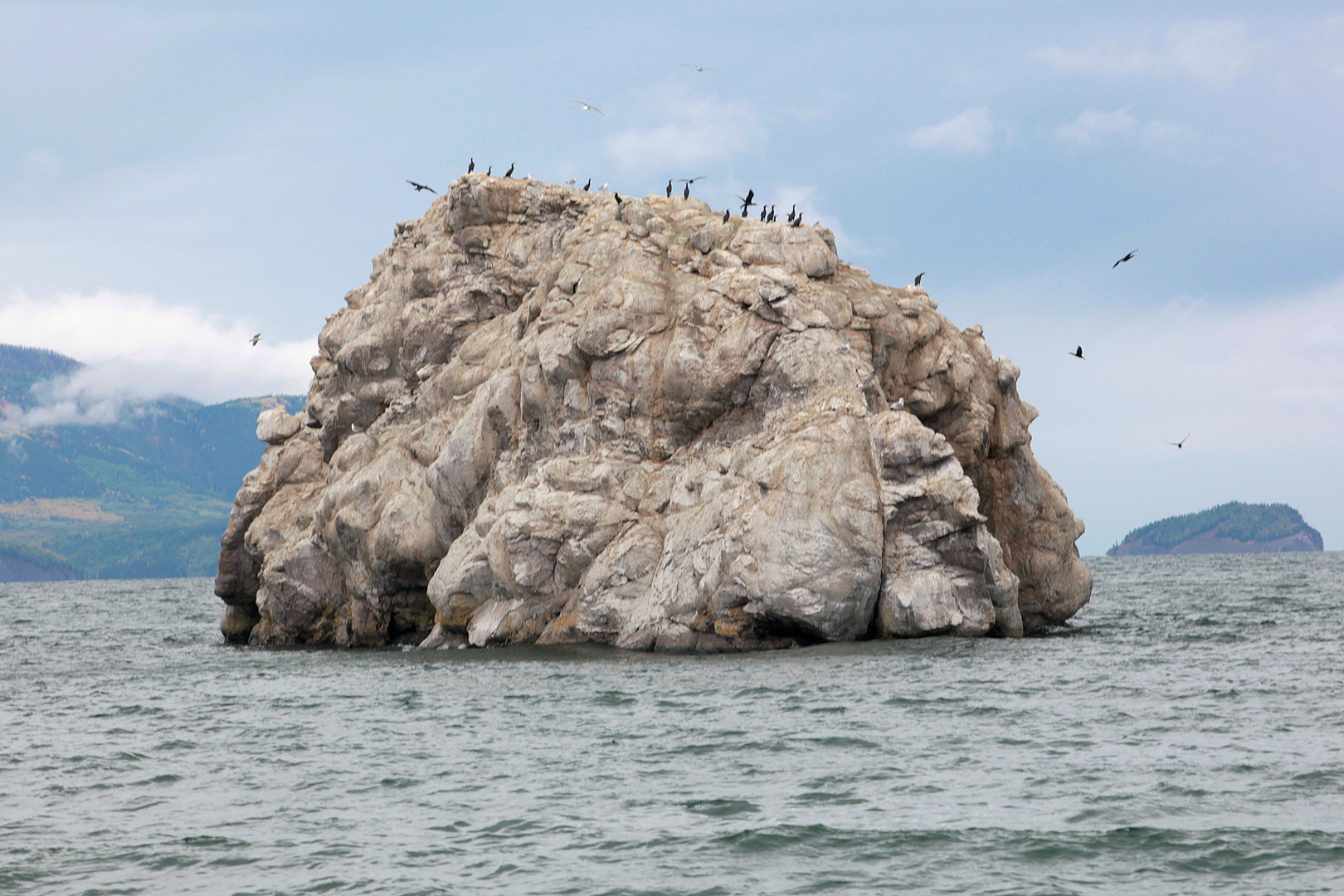
Pebble Island

== See also ==
- Protected areas of Russia
- South Siberian Mountains
