= Academician Ridge =

Mountains in Russia

Coordinates: 53°47′0″N 108°26′0″E

Academician Ridge is an underwater, structural high separating two of Lake Baikal's three basins, the Central and North basins. Situated in the central part of the Baikal Rift, it serves as an "accommodation zone", transferring "motion between faults of similar displacement but different orientation" (Hutchinson et al., 1992). The ridge is bounded by two large normal faults, the Primorsky Fault on the northwest and the Olkhon Fault on the southeast, and an oblique-slip fault, the Academician Fault, that runs along the crest of the ridge. The margins of the ridge, Olkhon Island to the southwest and the Ushkanie Islands to the northeast, are above lake level while the center of the ridge is submerged to depths of 350–400 m (Kuzmin et al., 2000).

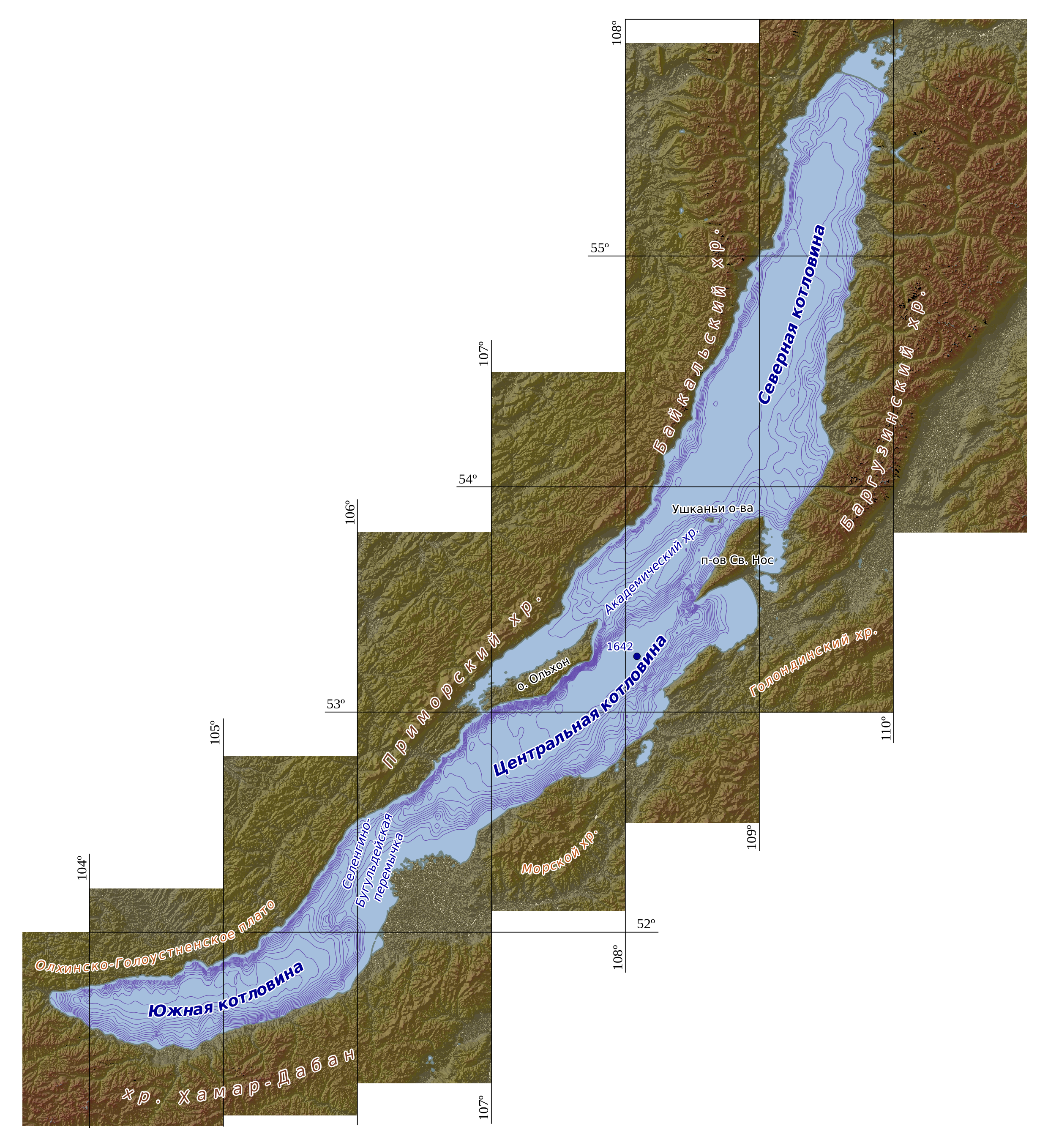
The submerged portion of Academician Ridge connects the Ushkany Islands (upper right just west of the Svyatoy Nos peninsula) with Olkhon Island (lower left). Click to see full lake relief map.

Academician Ridge represents a unique sedimentary environment within Lake Baikal. The depths of the two basins it separates, about 900 m in the North Basin and about 1600 m deep in the Central basin, isolate the ridge from mass-flows and turbidites. Therefore, sedimentation on Academician Ridge is restricted to fine, continuous hemipelagic sedimentation with dispersed coarse-grained sediment deposited by ice rafting (Kuzmin et al., 2000). The stratigraphy observed in boreholes drilled into Academician Ridge shows that the upper sequence of continuous hemipelagic deposits, which are consistent with a bathymetric high in a deep lacustrine environment, is underlain by a lower sequence that is consistent with prograding, deltaic deposits in a shallow-water environment (Mats et al., 2000). This change from a shallow-water environment to a deep-water environment represents two things: one, that Academician Ridge experienced gradual flooding and, two, that the presence of a lake in the North Basin occurred long after the presence of a lake in the Central and South basins first occurred (Mats et al., 2000).

Academician Ridge also plays an important role in deep-water mixing processes and the circulation of bottom currents. Water with a higher salinity than the lake is fed to the Central Basin by the Selenga River. In contrast, the Upper Angara River feeds the North Basin with fresh water. The result is dense, more saline surface waters from the Central Basin flowing northeast and passing over Academician Ridge into the less dense, less saline waters of the North Basin. The saline surface water then sinks along the density gradient to replenish the deep bottom waters of the North Basin (Francus and Karabanov, 2000; Colman et al., 2003).

Timeline of Major Events

Late Oligocene-Early Miocene	formation of a deep lake in the South and Central Basins
Middle-Late Miocene	uplift and formation of Academician Ridge
Late Miocene	gradual flooding of Academician Ridge
latest Pleistocene	complete submergence of Academician Ridge
