= Zabaykalsky (rural locality) =

Zabaykalsky (Russian: Забайка́льский; masculine), Zabaykalskaya (Забайка́льская; feminine), or Zabaykalskoye (Забайка́льское; neuter) is the name of several rural localities in Russia.

== Modern localities ==
- Zabaykalsky, Zabaykalsky Krai, a settlement in Chitinsky District of Zabaykalsky Krai
- Zabaykalskoye, a selo in Vyazemsky District of Khabarovsk Krai

== Historical localities ==
- Zabaykalsky, Republic of Buryatia, former settlement under the administrative jurisdiction of Oktyabrsky City District of the city of republic significance of Ulan-Ude, Republic of Buryatia; merged into Ulan-Ude in February 2010
