= Ushkan Islands =

Coordinates: 53°51′N 108°37′E

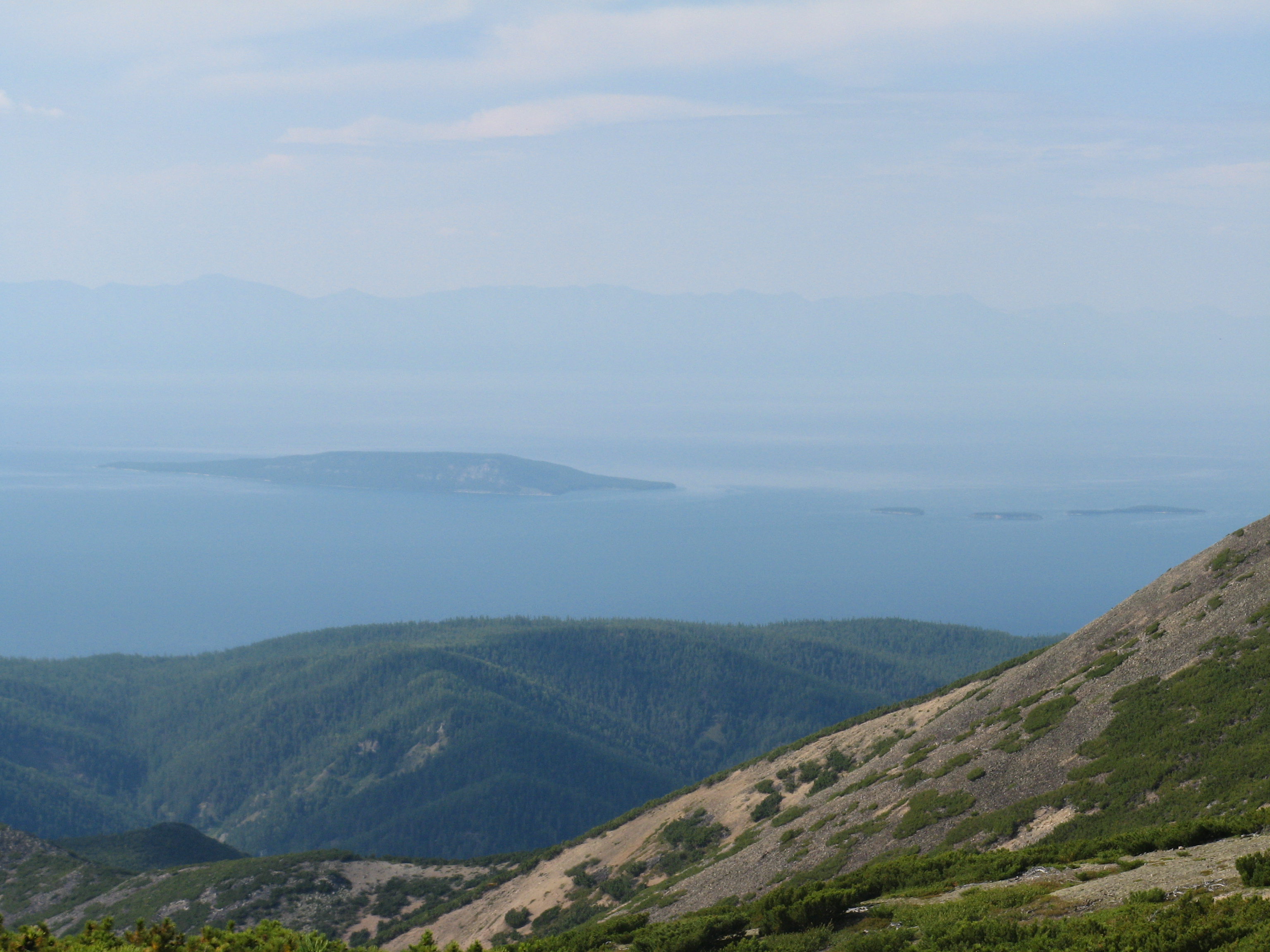
View of the Ushkany Islands from Svyatoy Nos Peninsula

The Ushkan Islands (Russian — Ушканьи острова or Ushkanji Ostrova) are a small archipelago on Lake Baikal in Russia. The group of islands consists of four islands:

- One large island — Big Ushkan Island, 9.5 km² or 3.7 sq mi.
- Three islets: Long Ushkan Islet (1.25 km length), Thin Ushkan Islet (17 m height from Baikal's surface), and Round Ushkan Islet.

The islands are mainly composed of ancient (pre-Cambrian) crystallic limestone, and covered with larch forest. Islands' coastlines are rookery places of Baikal seals.

A part of Transbaikal National Park, the Ushkan Islands are becoming a popular tourist destination. Nevertheless, special permission is required for landing on the islands — such means are imposed to reduce the impact of human activity and to save the natural conditions of the islands.
