= Ust-Barguzin =

Ust-Barguzin Усть-Баргузин
- Urban-type settlement

Other transcription(s)
  - Buryat: Баргажанай Адаг
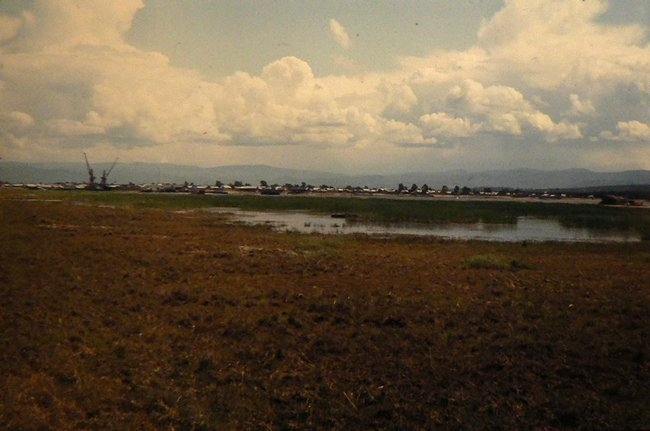
- View of Ust-Barguzin
- Interactive map of Ust-Barguzin
- Location of Ust-Barguzin Ust-Barguzin (Republic of Buryatia)
- Coordinates: 53°24′N 109°02′E
- Country: Russia
- Federal subject: Buryatia
- Administrative district: Barguzinsky District
- Urban-type settlementSelsoviet: Ust-Barguzin Urban-Type Settlement
- Founded: 1666

Population (2010 Census)
  - Total: 7,173
  - Estimate (2025): 6,064 (−15.5%)

Administrative status
  - Capital of: Ust-Barguzin Urban-Type Settlement

Municipal status
  - Municipal district: Barguzinsky Municipal District
  - Urban settlement: Ust-Barguzin Urban Settlement
  - Capital of: Ust-Barguzin Urban Settlement
- Time zone: UTC+8 (MSK+5)
- Postal codes: 671623, 671624
- OKTMO ID: 81603154051

Ust-Barguzin population
- 2010 Census: 7,173
- 2002 Census: 7,329
- 1989 Census: 7,204
- 1979 Census: 7,338

Ust-Barguzin (Russian: Усть-Баргузи́н; Buryat: Баргажанай Адаг, Bargajanai Adag) is an urban locality (an urban-type settlement) in Barguzinsky District of the Republic of Buryatia, Russia, located on the shore of Lake Baikal at the mouth of the Barguzin River and 270 kilometers (170 mi) northeast of Ulan-Ude, the capital of the republic. As of the 2010 Census, its population was 7,173.

== History ==
It was founded in 1666 by a Cossack detachment under Gavril Lovzov.

== Administrative and municipal status ==
Within the framework of administrative divisions, the urban-type settlement (inhabited locality) of Ust-Barguzin, together with eight rural localities, is incorporated within Barguzinsky District as Ust-Barguzin Urban-Type Settlement (an administrative division of the district). As a municipal division, Ust-Barguzin Urban-Type Settlement is incorporated within Barguzinsky Municipal District as Ust-Barguzin Urban Settlement.

== Climate ==
Ust-Barguzin has a subarctic climate (Köppen climate classification Dwc) with severely cold winters and mild summers. Precipitation is quite low and is significantly higher in summer than at other times of the year.

Climate data for Ust-Barguzin
Month	Jan	Feb	Mar	Apr	May	Jun	Jul	Aug	Sep	Oct	Nov	Dec	Year
Daily mean °C (°F)	−21.8 (−7.2)	−20.6 (−5.1)	−12.0 (10.4)	−2.1 (28.2)	4.9 (40.8)	10.9 (51.6)	14.9 (58.8)	14.6 (58.3)	8.2 (46.8)	0.4 (32.7)	−8.5 (16.7)	−15.6 (3.9)	−2.2 (28.0)
Average precipitation mm (inches)	8.8 (0.35)	5.6 (0.22)	4.6 (0.18)	12.2 (0.48)	20.5 (0.81)	38.8 (1.53)	76.5 (3.01)	59.0 (2.32)	44.2 (1.74)	25.5 (1.00)	35.0 (1.38)	40.8 (1.61)	371.5 (14.63)
Average precipitation days (≥ 1.0 mm)	2.6	1.7	1.4	2.9	4.2	5.5	7.7	7.0	6.5	5.5	9.2	10.7	64.9
Source: NOAA (1961-1990)
