= Barguzin (rural locality) =

Barguzin Баргузин
- Selo
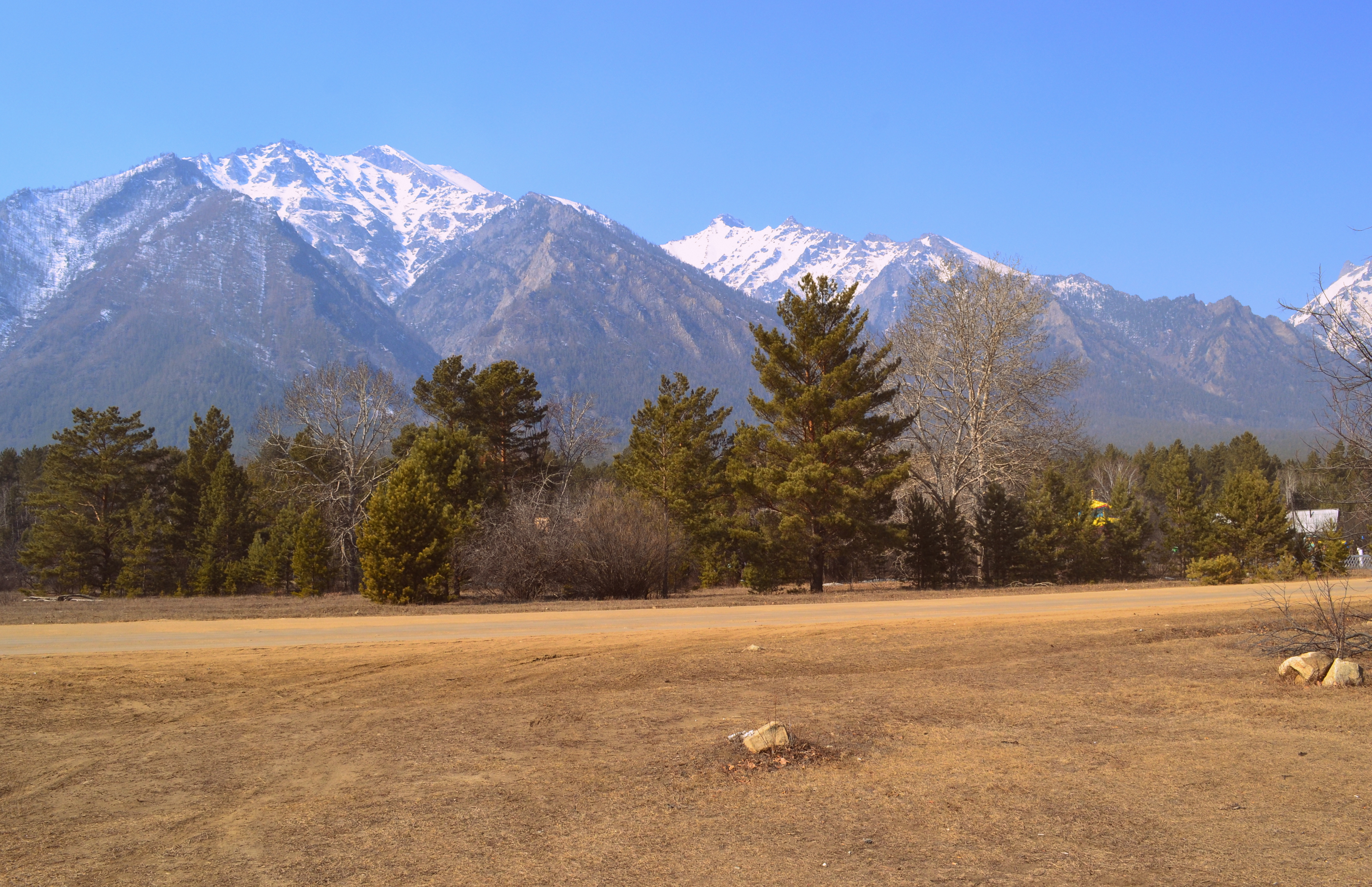

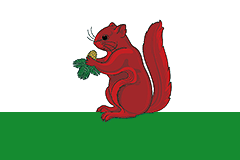
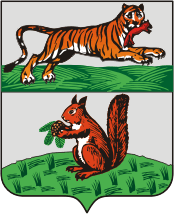
- Flag Coat of arms
- Interactive map of Barguzin
- Location of Barguzin Barguzin (Republic of Buryatia)
- Coordinates: 53°37′N 109°38′E
- Country: Russia
- Federal subject: Buryatia
- Administrative district: Barguzinsky District
- Founded: 1648
- Elevation: 487 m (1,598 ft)

Population (2010 Census)
  - Total: 5,702
  - Estimate (2021): 4,850 (−14.9%)

Administrative status
  - Capital of: Barguzinsky District
- Time zone: UTC+8 (MSK+5)
- Postal code: 671610
- OKTMO ID: 81603420101

Barguzin (Russian: Баргузи́н, Buryat: Баргажан, Bargajan) is a rural locality (a selo) and the administrative center of Barguzinsky District in the Republic of Buryatia, Russia, located on the left bank of the Barguzin River at the southern end of the Barguzin Valley. Barguzin lies at an elevation of 491 meters (1,611 ft) and is 240 kilometers (150 mi) from Ulan-Ude. Population: 5,702 (2010 census); 6,164 (2002 census); 6,151 (1989 Soviet census).

== Transportation ==
The P438 road leads southwest to the selo of Adamovo, the urban-type settlement of Ust-Barguzin, and eventually to Ulan-Ude; it leads northeast along the Barguzin Valley to Ulyun and Kurumkan.

Barguzin is served by the Barguzin Airport.

== Climate ==
Barguzin has a subarctic climate (Köppen climate classification Dwc), with severely cold winters and warm summers. Precipitation is quite low but is significantly higher in July and August than at other times of the year.

Climate data for Barguzin
Month	Jan	Feb	Mar	Apr	May	Jun	Jul	Aug	Sep	Oct	Nov	Dec	Year
Record high °C (°F)	2.3 (36.1)	5.6 (42.1)	13.4 (56.1)	24.5 (76.1)	34.6 (94.3)	35.2 (95.4)	36.8 (98.2)	36.8 (98.2)	27.7 (81.9)	20.5 (68.9)	13.8 (56.8)	5.0 (41.0)	36.8 (98.2)
Mean daily maximum °C (°F)	−22.4 (−8.3)	−16.8 (1.8)	−4.5 (23.9)	6.1 (43.0)	15.3 (59.5)	22.9 (73.2)	25.2 (77.4)	22.2 (72.0)	14.7 (58.5)	4.9 (40.8)	−7.6 (18.3)	−17.3 (0.9)	3.6 (38.4)
Daily mean °C (°F)	−27.3 (−17.1)	−23.2 (−9.8)	−11.7 (10.9)	0.0 (32.0)	8.3 (46.9)	15.5 (59.9)	18.6 (65.5)	16.0 (60.8)	8.6 (47.5)	−0.5 (31.1)	−12.6 (9.3)	−22.6 (−8.7)	−2.6 (27.4)
Mean daily minimum °C (°F)	−32.4 (−26.3)	−29.1 (−20.4)	−18.3 (−0.9)	−5.7 (21.7)	1.3 (34.3)	8.4 (47.1)	12.5 (54.5)	10.5 (50.9)	3.4 (38.1)	−5.0 (23.0)	−17.4 (0.7)	−27.6 (−17.7)	−8.3 (17.1)
Record low °C (°F)	−50.2 (−58.4)	−48.9 (−56.0)	−41.5 (−42.7)	−29.2 (−20.6)	−12.3 (9.9)	−3.0 (26.6)	2.1 (35.8)	−1.6 (29.1)	−10.3 (13.5)	−29.3 (−20.7)	−42.6 (−44.7)	−49.2 (−56.6)	−50.2 (−58.4)
Average precipitation mm (inches)	14.4 (0.57)	6.4 (0.25)	5.0 (0.20)	10.3 (0.41)	13.6 (0.54)	34.0 (1.34)	74.9 (2.95)	63.0 (2.48)	37.0 (1.46)	22.7 (0.89)	31.4 (1.24)	32.6 (1.28)	345.3 (13.61)
Average precipitation days (≥ 0.1 mm)	16.6	10.3	9.6	5.6	11.0	5.7	8.4	9.0	9.7	12.1	19.1	20.3	137.4
Average relative humidity (%)	79.1	75.4	68.0	55.8	55.5	61.9	69.1	76.7	73.8	72.9	82.1	84.3	71.2
Mean monthly sunshine hours	77.5	100.8	170.5	246.0	254.2	294.0	322.4	226.3	198.0	145.7	57.0	52.7	2,145.1
Source: climatebase.ru (1948-2011)
