= Barguzinsky District =

Barguzinsky District Баргузинский район (Russian)
- District

Other transcription(s)
  - Buryat: Баргажанай аймаг
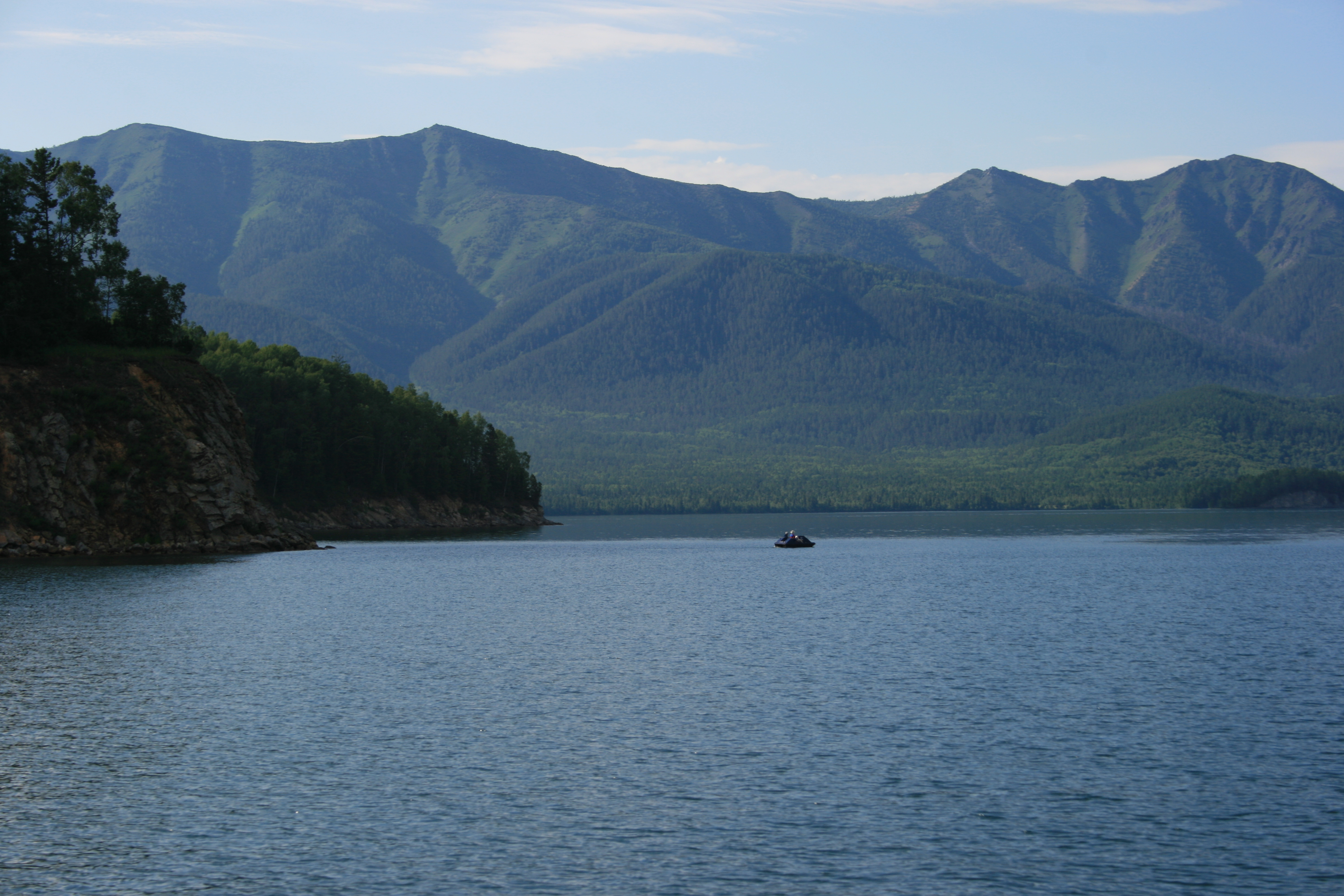
- Zmeinaya Bay in Barguzinsky District

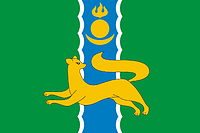
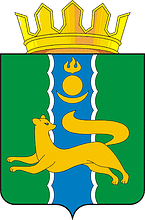
- Flag Coat of arms
- Location of Barguzinsky District in the Buryat Republic
- Coordinates: 53°37′N 109°37′E
- Country: Russia
- Federal subject: Republic of Buryatia
- Established: December 23, 1923
- Administrative center: Barguzin

Area
  - Total: 18,553 km^{2} (7,163 sq mi)

Population (2010 Census)
  - Total: 23,598
  - Density: 1.2719/km^{2} (3.2943/sq mi)
  - Urban: 30.4%
  - Rural: 69.6%

Administrative structure
  - Administrative divisions: 1 Urban-type settlements, 6 Selsoviets, 3 Somons
  - Inhabited localities: 1 urban-type settlements, 33 rural localities

Municipal structure
  - Municipally incorporated as: Barguzinsky Municipal District
  - Municipal divisions: 1 urban settlements, 9 rural settlements
- Time zone: UTC+8 (MSK+5)
- OKTMO ID: 81603000
- Website: http://barguzin.su

Population of Barguzinsky District
- 2010 Census: 23,598
- 2002 Census: 26,256
- 1989 Census: 27,585
- 1979 Census: 27,164

Barguzinsky District (Russian: Баргузи́нский райо́н; Buryat: Баргажанай аймаг, Bargajanai aimag) is an administrative and municipal district (raion), one of the twenty-one in the Republic of Buryatia, Russia. It is located in the northeast of the republic. The area of the district is 18,553 square kilometers (7,163 sq mi). Its administrative center is the rural locality (a selo) of Barguzin. As of the 2010 Census, the total population of the district was 23,598, with the population of Barguzin accounting for 24.2% of that number.

== Geography ==
The district is situated at the mouth of the Barguzin River within the Barguzin Valley. The absolute height of the bottom of the basin ranges from 500 to 700 meters (1,600 to 2,300 ft), whereas the elevation of the surrounding mountain ranges up to 2,000–2,700 meters (6,600–8,900 ft) above sea level.

In floodplain areas and terraces, the Barguzin River and its tributaries are characterized by the alternation of a mosaic of meadow steppe, steppe, and wetland spaces. Forest vegetation prevails in the foothill areas and on the slopes of the rivers, up to 1,100–1,300 meters (3,600–4,300 ft) altitude. The forests are rich in berries, mushrooms, and nuts.

== History ==
The district was established on December 23, 1923.

== Administrative and municipal status ==
Within the framework of administrative divisions, Barguzinsky District is one of the twenty-one in the Republic of Buryatia. It is divided into one urban-type settlement (an administrative division with the administrative center in the urban-type settlement (an inhabited locality) of Ust-Barguzin), six selsoviets, and three somons, which comprise thirty-three rural localities. As a municipal division, the district is incorporated as Barguzinsky Municipal District. The urban-type settlement is incorporated as an urban settlement, and the six selsoviets and three somons are incorporated as nine rural settlements within the municipal district. The selo of Barguzin serves as the administrative center of both the administrative and municipal district.
