= 2022 Buryat head election =

| ← 2017 | 11 September 2022 | 2027 → |
- Turnout: 39.41%
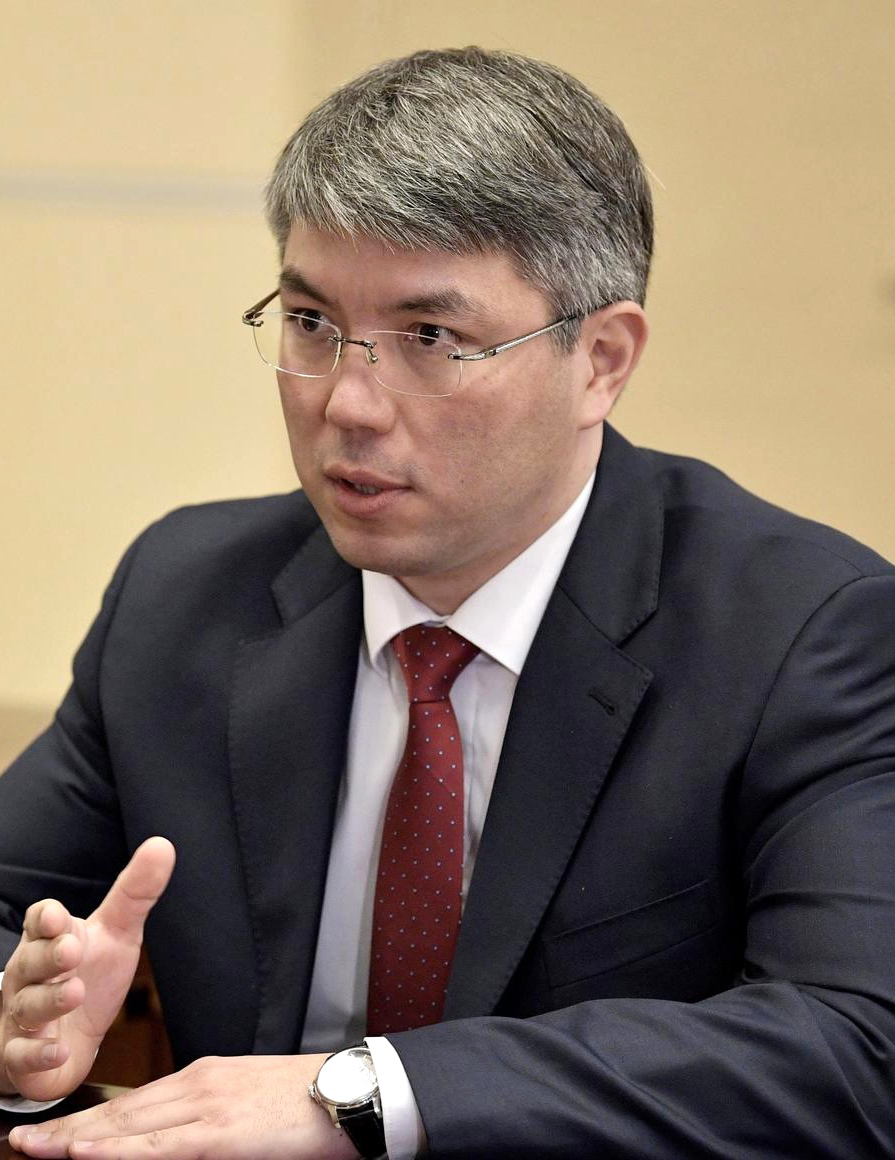
| | | CPRF |
| Nominee | Alexey Tsydenov | Viktor Malyshenko |
| Party | United Russia | CPRF |
| Popular vote | 235,380 | 19,429 |
| Percentage | 86.23% | 7.12% |
Head before election
Alexey Tsydenov
United Russia
Elected Head
Alexey Tsydenov
United Russia

The 2022 Republic of Buryatia head election took place on 11 September 2022, on common election day. Incumbent Head Alexey Tsydenov was re-elected to a second term.

== Background ==
Deputy Minister of Transport Alexey Tsydenov was appointed Head of Buryatia in February 2017. He successfully won election to a full term with 87% of the vote.

Due to the start of the Russian invasion of Ukraine in February 2022 and subsequent economic sanctions the cancellation and postponement of direct gubernatorial elections was proposed. The measure was even supported by A Just Russia leader Sergey Mironov.

However, Aleksey Tsydenov publicly supported direct head election. On 31 May President Vladimir Putin endorsed Tsydenov for reelection. On 9 June People's Khural of the Republic of Buryatia called head election for 11 September 2022.

== Candidates ==
Only political parties can nominate candidates for head election in Buryatia, self-nomination is not possible. However, candidate is not obliged to be a member of the nominating party. Candidate for Head of Buryatia should be a Russian citizen and at least 30 years old. Each candidate in order to be registered is required to collect at least 7% of signatures of members and heads of municipalities (207-217 signatures). Also gubernatorial candidates present 3 candidacies to the Federation Council and election winner later appoints one of the presented candidates.

=== Registered ===
- Sergey Dorosh (LDPR), Member of People's Khural of the Republic of Buryatia, 2017 head candidate
- Viktor Malyshenko (CPRF), Member of People's Khural of the Republic of Buryatia
- Semyon Matkheyev (New People), businessman
- Alexey Tsydenov (United Russia), incumbent Head of Buryatia

=== Declined ===
- Igor Bobkov (RPPSS), Member of People's Khural of the Republic of Buryatia
- Vyacheslav Markhayev (CPRF), Member of State Duma, 2017 head candidate

=== Candidates for Federation Council ===
- Sergey Dorosh (LDPR):
  - Yulia Maltseva, accountant
  - Dmitry Teslenko, physician
  - Badmadorzho Zhigzhitov, Member of People's Khural of the Republic of Buryatia
- Viktor Malyshenko (CPRF):
  - Anatoly Kovalev, Member of People's Khural of the Republic of Buryatia
  - Vyacheslav Markhayev, Member of State Duma, former Senator from Irkutsk Oblast (2015-2020), 2017 head candidate
  - Bair Tsyrenov, Member of People's Khural of the Republic of Buryatia
- Semyon Matkheyev (New People):
  - Maksim Buvalin, general director of "Ulan-Ude Energo"
  - Aldar Galsanov, unemployed
  - Shirap Khaludorov, aide to State Duma member Georgy Arapov
- Aleksey Tsydenov (United Russia):
  - Leonid Belykh, former general director of Ulan-Ude Aviation Plant (1998-2021)
  - Tatyana Mantatova, Deputy Chair of People's Khural of the Republic of Buryatia, former Senator from Buryatia (2017)
  - Vyacheslav Nagovitsyn, incumbent Senator

== Finances ==
All sums are in rubles.

| Financial Report | Source | Dorosh | Malyshenko | Matkheyev | Tsydenov |
|---|---|---|---|---|---|
| First | | 900,000 | 304,150 | 330,000 | 385,000 |
| Final | | 3,000,000 | 1,748,522 | 1,684,160 | 35,000,000 |

== Results ==
Summary of the 11 September 2022 Buryatia head election results
| Candidate | Party | Votes | % |
|---|---|---|---|
| Alexey Tsydenov (incumbent) | United Russia | 235,380 | 86.23 |
| Viktor Malyshenko | Communist Party | 19,429 | 7.12 |
| Sergey Dorosh | Liberal Democratic Party | 7,264 | 2.66 |
| Semyon Matkheyev | New People | 6,414 | 2.35 |
| Valid votes | | 268,487 | 98.36 |
| Blank ballots | | 4,479 | 1.64 |
| Total | | 272,966 | 100.00 |
| Turnout | | 272,966 | 39.41 |
| Registered voters | | 692,590 | 100.00 |

Incumbent Senator Vyacheslav Nagovitsyn (United Russia) was re-appointed to the Federation Council.

== See also ==
- 2022 Russian gubernatorial elections
