= 2017 Buryat head election =

- 10 September 2017
- Turnout: 41.65%
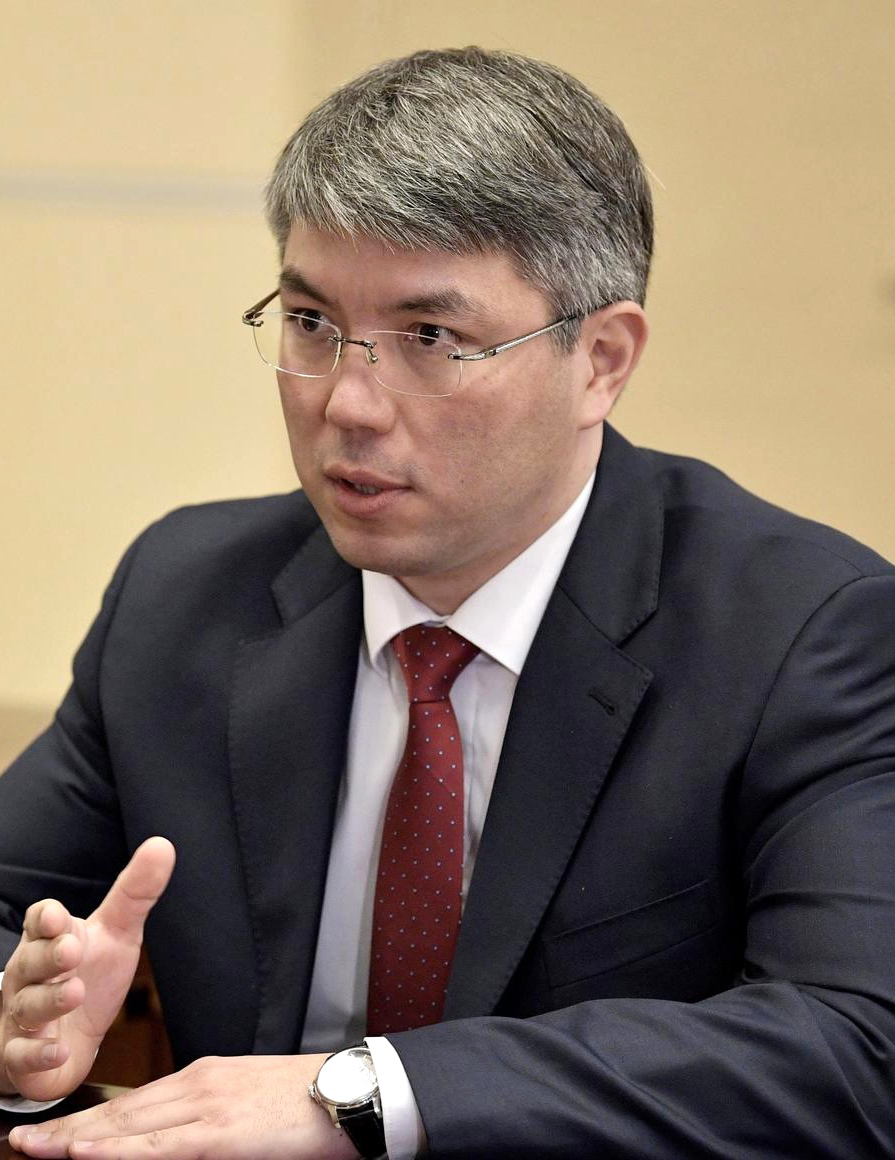
		CR
Nominee	Alexey Tsydenov	Batodalay Bagdayev
Party	United Russia	CPCR
Popular vote	260,028	15,325
Percentage	87.43%	5.15%
Head before election
Alexey Tsydenov (acting)
United Russia
Elected Head
Alexey Tsydenov
United Russia

The 2017 Republic of Buryatia head election took place on 10 September 2017, on common election day. Acting Head Aleksey Tsydenov was elected for his first full term. It was the first direct Buryatia head election in 15 years since Leonid Potapov won his third term in June 2002.

== Background ==
Head of Buryatia Vyacheslav Nagovitsyn (President of the Republic until 2012) was first appointed in 2007, he was re-appointed for a second term in 2012. On 7 February 2017, Nagovitsyn declined to seek a third term and announced his resignation at a press conference. Deputy Minister of Transport Alexey Tsydenov was appointed acting Head of the Republic. He also became the first ethnic Buryat to lead the republic.

The campaign was marked by lack of significant opposition to acting head Tsydenov, as his main opponent, Senator Vyacheslav Markhayev (CPRF), failed to qualify for the election. A Just Russia did not nominate a candidate, as its regional leader Irinchey Matkhanov was placed by Tsydenov into its shortlist for Federation Council.

== Candidates ==
Only political parties can nominate candidates for head election in Buryatia, self-nomination is not possible. However, candidate is not obliged to be a member of the nominating party. Candidate for Head of Buryatia should be a Russian citizen and at least 30 years old. Each candidate in order to be registered is required to collect at least 7% of signatures of members and heads of municipalities (216-226 signatures). Also gubernatorial candidates present 3 candidacies to the Federation Council and election winner later appoints one of the presented candidates.

=== Registered candidates ===
Candidate	Party	Office
Batodalay Bagdayev; Born 1972 (age 45)	Communists of Russia	general director of "Newspaper "Ulan-Ude""
Sergey Dorosh; Born 1987 (age 30)	Liberal Democratic Party	aide to Member of the State Duma
Alexey Tsydenov; Born 1976 (age 41)	United Russia	acting Head of Republic, former Deputy Minister of Transport of Russia (2012-2017)

=== Failed to qualify ===
- Vyacheslav Markhayev (CPRF), Member of Federation Council from Irkutsk Oblast
- Igor Pronkinov (Party of Pensioners), businessman, former leader of Buryat-Mongol People's Party, 1998 head candidate

=== Withdrew ===
- Yury Bazarzhapov (Party of the Parents of Future), private kindergartens' owner

=== Eliminated at convention ===
- Yury Bavykin (United Russia), Member of Ulan-Ude City Council, Director of Ulan-Ude Institute of Rail Transport
- Yevgeny Menshikov (LDPR), businessman, former leader of Civilian Power and Right Cause regional offices

=== Declined ===
- Yevgeny Buyanin (LDPR), local activist, former leader of Rodina regional office
- Mikhail Slipenchuk (Party of Growth), former Member of State Duma (2011-2016)

== Opinion polls ==
Date	Poll source	Tsydenov	Dorosh	Bagdayev	Other	Undecided	Abstention	Spoil the Ballot
17–25 July 2017	FOM	50%	1%	<1%	8%	30%	10%	1%

== Results ==
Candidate	Party	Votes	%
Alexey Tsydenov	United Russia	260,028	90.16
Batodalay Bagdayev	Communists of Russia	15,325	5.31
Sergey Dorosh	Liberal Democratic Party	13,056	4.53
Total		288,409	100.00
Valid votes		288,409	96.98
Invalid/blank votes		8,988	3.02
Total votes		297,397	100.00
Registered voters/turnout		713,953	41.65
Source: Buryatia Elections

Tsydenov appointed former Head of Buryatia Vyacheslav Nagovitsyn to the Federation Council. Among other candidacies were incumbent Senator Tatyana Mantatova and former A Just Russia Member of State Duma (2013-2016) Irinchey Matkhanov.

== See also ==
- 2017 Russian gubernatorial elections
