= Alexander Varfolomeev =

Russian politician (born 1965)

- Александр Варфоломеев
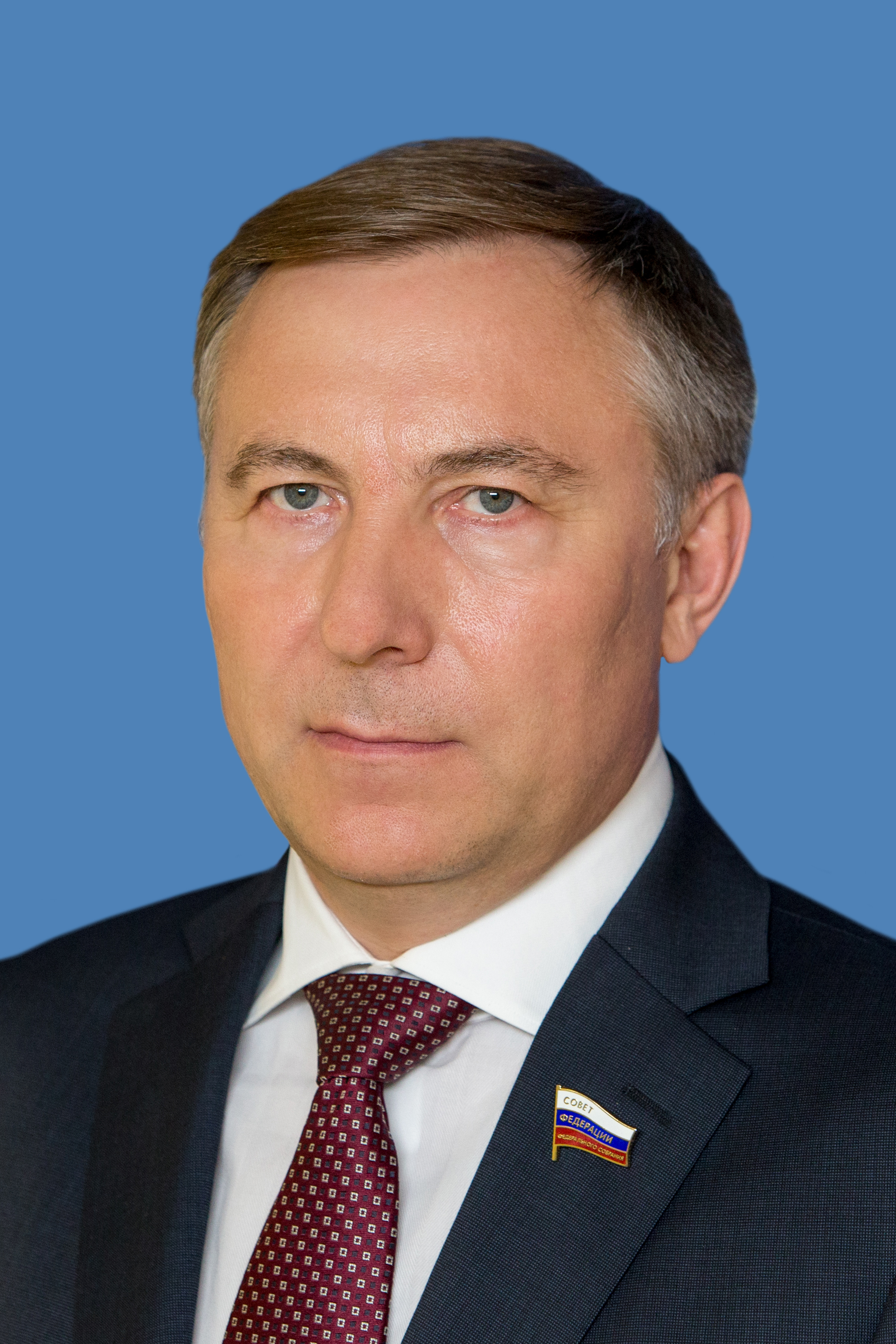
- Official portrait, 2018

Senator of Russia from Buryatia
- Incumbent
- Assumed office 19 September 2018
- Preceded by: Innokentiy Egorov

Personal details
- Born: Alexander Varfolomeev; 4 June 1965 (age 61) Mukhorshibir, Buryat ASSR, Russian SFSR, Soviet Union
- Party: United Russia
- Education: Irkutsk State University, East Siberia State University of Technology and Management

Alexander Georgievich Varfolomeev (Russian: Александр Георгиевич Варфоломеев; born 4 June 1965) is a Russian politician serving as a Senator of Russia from Buryatia since 19 September 2018.

== Biography ==
Alexander Varfolomeev was born on 4 June 1965. In 1987, he graduated from the Irkutsk State University. In 2000, he also received a degree from the East Siberia State University of Technology and Management. After that, he worked as a journalist in Mukhorshibir. He was also a member of the Communist Party of the Soviet Union.

From 1988 to 1991, he was the first secretary of the Mukhorshibir district committee of the Komsomol. In 1994, Varfolomeev started working as an assistant to the senator from the People's Khural of the Republic of Buryatia Lidya Nimaeva. Later he was appointed as a deputy head of the first president of Buryatia Leonid Potapov. From 1998 to 2013, he served as a deputy of the People's Khural of the Republic of Buryatia. Since 18 September 2013, he has served as a Senator from the People's Khural of the Republic of Buryatia. Varfolomeev was re-elected in September 2018.

Varfolomeev is under personal sanctions introduced by the European Union, the United Kingdom, the USA, Canada, Switzerland, Australia, Ukraine, New Zealand, for ratifying the decisions of the "Treaty of Friendship, Cooperation and Mutual Assistance between the Russian Federation and the Donetsk People's Republic and between the Russian Federation and the Luhansk People's Republic" and providing political and economic support for Russia's annexation of Ukrainian territories.
