= Dorzhi Banzarov =

19th-century Buryat/Russian scholar (1822-1855)

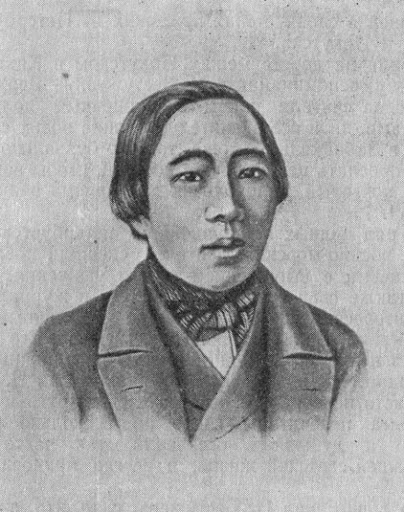
- Lithographic depiction of Dorzhi Banzarov
- Born: March 1822; Dede-Ichyotuy, Transbaikal, Russian Empire
- Died: March 1855 (aged 32–33); Irkutsk, Russian Empire
- Occupation: Orientalist

Dorzhi Banzarov (Note: Alternatively spelled Dorji, Dordji) (Buryat: Банзарай Доржо; Russian: Доржи́ Банза́ров, Russian pronunciation: [dɐrˈʐi bənzˈarɐv] c. 1822–1855) was a Buryat Orientalist and linguist. He is generally considered to be the first Buryat academic.

== Biography ==
Banzarov was born to a Buryat Cossack peasant family in Dede-Ichyotuy in March 1822 in the modern-day Dzhidinsky District. Besides Dorzhi, there were four other sons in the family — Lochon, Badma, Dzonduy, and Kharagshan — two of whom would go on to become Lamas. His father, Banzar Borgonov, was an officer of the former Ashaabagad regiment, and followed the Buddhist faith. The Brockhaus and Efron Encyclopedic Dictionary records him as a member of the Uriankhai peoples.

In 1833 he was sent to the Russo-Mongolian Military School in Troitskosavsk, and then in 1835 to the Kazan Gymnasium, where he studied for 7 years. In 1842 he entered Kazan University, where he studied under Józef Kowalewski and began to specialize in Oriental studies.

Banzarov was reported to have an almost prodigious aptitude for languages. Besides his native Buryat and Russian languages, he was reported to have studied Manchu, Kalmyk, Tibetan, Sanskrit and Turkish, and to have a good understanding of English, Latin, French and German.

While studying at the university, he began to translate foreign works into the Mongolian language, such as The Travels of Faxian, The Travels of Tulišen, and the 16th-century Kalmyk work Ubashi Khung Taidzhi.

=== Black Faith, or, Shamanism with the Mongols ===
He received his Ph.D. in 1846 with the paper Black Faith or Shamanism with the Mongols. This paper was received with great interest by fellow Orientalists, such as Pavel Stepanovich Savelyev, who wrote in his biography of Banzarov: "It reflects well on the [Buryat] people and the Buryats are worthy of attention, simply because out of their midst came Dorzhi Banzarov." and Grigory Potanin, who wrote in an 1891 re-publication of Banzarov's work: "One purpose of republishing this work was to provide to those, who study the mythology and folklore of the Siberian peoples, a chance to look at the work of Banzarov, which has become a bibliographic rarity, but the main goal was to remind the Buryat people of this wonderful representative [of them], as well as the Russian public of this isolated occurrence that happened once over 30 years ago and has since never been repeated."

In Black Faith, Banzarov brought forth the idea that Mongolian shamanism was a sophisticated belief system with unique origins, and not an offshoot of Buddhism, Christianity, or any other major religion.

=== Later life ===
Due to his Cossack origins, however, he was obligated to begin service to the nation for 25 years as soon as he graduated. He left for St Petersburg to present his case to the Governing Senate, which decreed in 1850 that he should relocate to Irkutsk to work for the Irkutsk Governorate.

In the meantime, Banzarov spent 1847-1849 working in the Asiatic Museum of St Petersburg. One of his prominent works at the Museum was to translate the writing on the Stele of Genghis Khan. His efforts were praised by those such as Otto von Böhtlingk and Wilhelm Schott. He found his life in Irkutsk to be difficult, but continued to write papers and conduct scientific studies nevertheless.

He died in 1855. Supposedly, he had been suffering from poor health for some time, and when a colleague came to visit him in late February 1855, he found Banzarov dead. He was buried according to Buddhist tradition.

== Legacy ==
During his lifetime and after his death, Banzarov was praised and admired by other cultural figures and intellectuals of Russia such as Nikolay Nekrasov, Nikolay Chernyshevsky, Pavel Ivanovich Melnikov, and Alexander Veselovsky; he remains the subject of scholarly interest in Russia, despite his relatively small scholarly output.

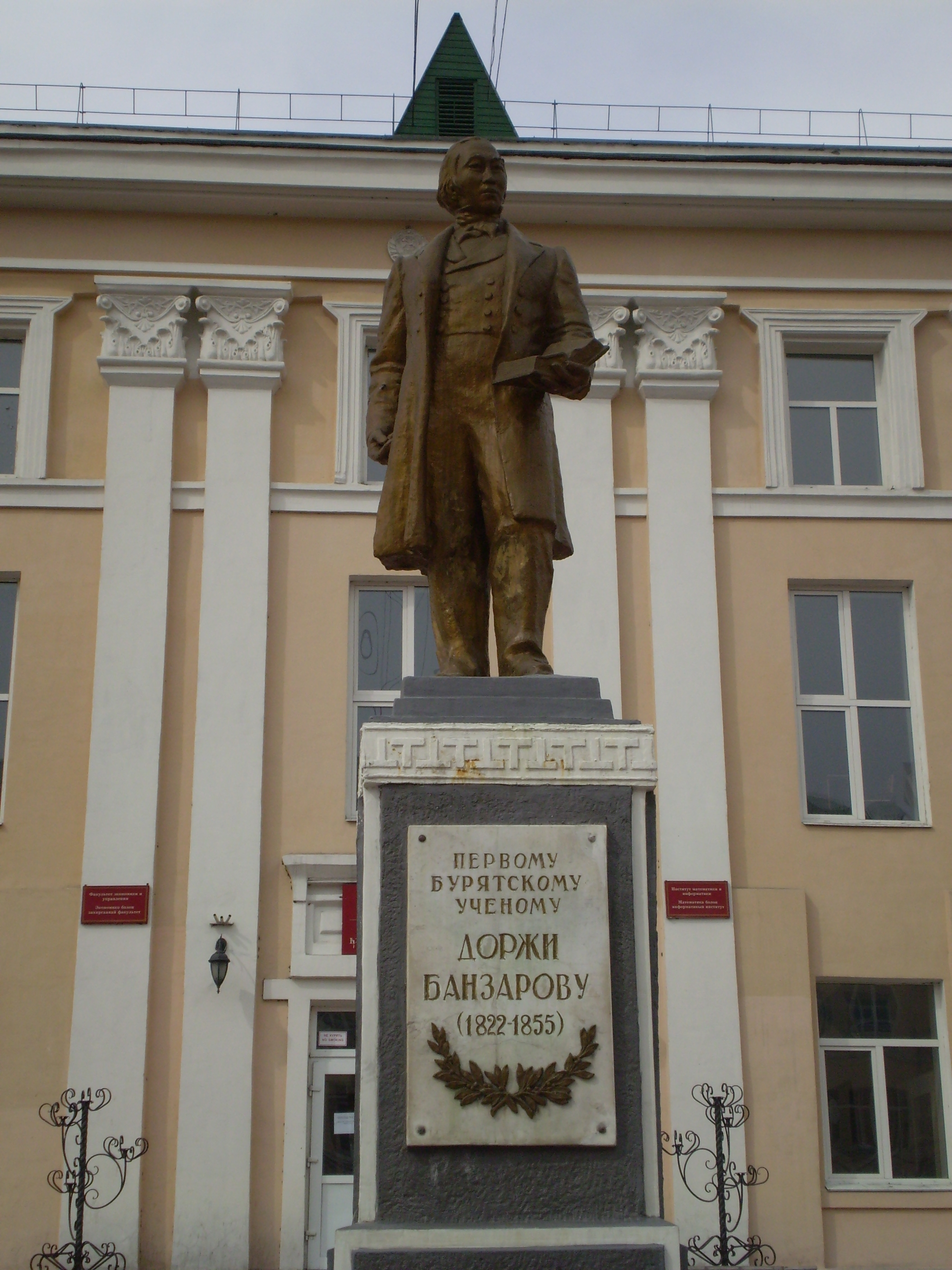
Statue of Banzarov in Ulan-Ude

In 1947, the Buryat State University was named after him, in honor of the 125th year of his birth. A street in Ulan-Ude, the capital of Buryatia, was also renamed from "Buryatskaya Street" to "Dorzhi Banzarov Street." In the 1990s, the university shifted to simply "Buryat State University", eliciting negative reactions from many Buryats; in 2019 it was renamed "Dorzhi Banzarov Buryat State University".

He is an important figure for the Buryat people as one of the first Buryat intellectuals to gain mass acclaim in Russia and for building the academic field of Mongolian studies in Russia, and for being amongst the first members of the colonized peoples of Siberia to rise to the level of an academic career. The beginnings of the Buryat intelligentsia are said to begin with him and another Buryat academic, Galsan Gomboev.

A statue of him was installed in June 2010 in Dzhidinsky District to celebrate the 75th anniversary of the founding of the district. The sculptor was Buryat G. G. Vasilyev. There is also a statue of him in Ulan-Ude, and a memorial to him at Kazan University, installed in October 2020.
