= Vyacheslav Markhayev =

Russian politician (born 1955)

Vyacheslav Markhayev MP
- Вячеслав Мархаев
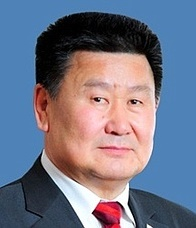

Member of the State Duma (Party List Seat)
- Incumbent
- Assumed office 12 October 2021
- In office 21 December 2011 – 16 October 2015
- Succeeded by: Yuri Tarmaev

Russian Federation Senator from Irkutsk Oblast
- In office 2 October 2015 – 23 September 2020
- Preceded by: Oleg Kankov
- Succeeded by: Andrey Chernyshev

Personal details
- Born: 1 June 1955 (age 71) Sharaldai, Bokhansky District, Ust-Orda Buryat Okrug, Russian SFSR, Soviet Union
- Party: Communist
- Spouse: Larisa Markhayeva
- Children: 4
- Education: Buryat State Pedagogical Institute (1977); Khabarovsk Higher School of the MVD of Russia (1993)
- Occupation: politician

Vyacheslav Mikhailovich Markhayev (Note: Also transliterated as Markhaev.) (Russian: Вячесла́в Миха́йлович Марха́ев; born 1 June 1955, Sharaldai, Bokhansky District, Irkutsk Oblast) is a Russian politician who has been a member of the State Duma since 2021. He was previously a member of the State Duma between 2011 and 2015.

He served as the Senator from Irkutsk Oblast on executive authority from 2015 to 2020. He was the First Secretary of the Buryat Communist Party.

== Biography ==
He was born in the family of a schoolteacher in the village of Sharaldai. In 1977 he graduated from the Buryat State University.

From 1980 to 2007 he worked in the internal affairs bodies. Founder and first commander of the Buryat riot police. He began his career in the Ministry of Internal Affairs with the district police officer, and was promoted to deputy minister at the Ministry of Internal Affairs. In 2007, with the rank of colonel, he retired from service.

In December 2007, Markhayev became the deputy of the People's Khural of the Republic of Buryatia, the head of the Communist Party faction.

During the 2011 Russian legislative election he received a deputy mandate for the 6th State Duma of the Federal Assembly of Russia on the CPRF list. Following the electoral victory of fellow communist Sergey Levchenko for governor of Irkutsk Oblast in September 2015, Levchenko announced his intention to nominate Markhayev to the Federation Council.

He officially resigned form the State Duma on 16 October 2015, two weeks after his appointment to the Senate.

In 2017, Markhaev was nominated as one of the candidates for the head of Buryatia by Communist Party of the Russian Federation, but he could not overcome the municipal filter.

In 2019 he publicly condemned the heavy-handed police response to protests surrounding the 2019 Moscow City Duma election.

On 11 March 2020 he was the only member of the Federation Council of the Federal Assembly of the Russian Federation who voted against the amendments to the Russian Constitution. He spoke out against the 2022 Russian invasion of Ukraine, although his criticisms only refer to Russia's military campaign outside of Donbas, while he fully supports the narrative that Ukraine is governed by "neo-Nazis".

=== Sanctions ===
Markhayev was one of the 324 members of the State Duma the United States Treasury sanctioned on 24 March 2022 in response to the 2022 Russian invasion of Ukraine.

Markhayev was also sanctioned by the UK government in 2022 in relation to the Russo-Ukrainian War.
