= Buryat Regional Committee of the Communist Party of the Soviet Union =

The First Secretary of the Buryat regional branch of the Communist Party of the Soviet Union was the position of highest authority in the Buryat ASSR (until July 7, 1958, Buryat–Mongol ASSR) in the Russian SFSR of the Soviet Union. The position was created in August 1923, and abolished in August 1991. The First Secretary was a de facto appointed position usually by the Politburo or the General Secretary himself.

== List of First Secretaries of the Communist Party of Buryatia ==
Name	Term of Office		Life years
Name	Start	End	Life years
First Secretaries of the Communist Party
Vasily Trubacheyev	August 1923	November 25, 1924	1895–?
Mariya Sakhyanova	November 25, 1924	December 6, 1928	1896–1981
Mikhey Yerbanov	December 1928	September 30, 1937	1889–1937
Grigory Vorontsov (Note: Acting)	September 30, 1937	October 25, 1937	
Semyon Ignatyev (Note: Acting to June 1938)	October 25, 1937	March 6, 1943	1904–1983
Aleksandr Kudryavtsev	March 6, 1943	March 16, 1951	1906–?
Aleksandr Khakhalov	March 16, 1951	November 23, 1960	1909–1970
Vasily Filipov	November 23, 1960	June 12, 1962	1913–1993
Andrey Modogoyev	June 12, 1962	January 7, 1984	1915–1989
Anatoly Belyakov	January 7, 1984	March 24, 1990	1933–
Leonid Potapov	April 6, 1990	August 1991	1935–2020

== See also ==
- Buryat Autonomous Soviet Socialist Republic

== Sources ==
- World Statesmen.org
