= Tatyana Mantatova =

Russian politician (born 1975)

- Татьяна Мантатова
- Mantatova in 2017

Senator from Buryatia
- In office 16 February 2017 – September 2017
- Preceded by: Arnold Tulokhonov
- Succeeded by: Vyacheslav Nagovitsyn

Personal details
- Born: 31 January 1975 (age 51) Nukutsky District, Ust-Orda Buryat Autonomous Okrug, Irkutsk Oblast, Russian Soviet Federative Socialist Republic, Soviet Union
- Party: United Russia
- Education: Buryat State University

Tatyana Yevgenyevna Mantatova (Russian: Татьяна Евгеньевна Мантатова; born 27 June 1961) is a Russian politician who served as a senator from Buryatia from February to September 2017.

== Career ==
Tatyana Mantatova was born on 27 June 1961 in Nukutsky District, Ust-Orda Buryat Autonomous Okrug. In 1999, she graduated from the Buryat State University. From 2005 to 2009, she taught at the Buryat State University and was the Head of the Department of Civil Law and Procedure. In 2009, she became a head of the media holding "Arig Us". On 8 September 2013, she was elected deputy of the People's Khural of the Republic of Buryatia. On 16 February 2017, Mantatova was appointed the senator from the Buryatia. Her term of office in the Federation Council expired in September 2017.
