= Dede-Ichyotuy =

Dede-Ichyotuy Дэдэ-Ичётуй
- Selo
- Location within Republic of Buryatia Location within Russia
- Coordinates: 50°44′N 105°25′E
- Country: Russia
- Region: Republic of Buryatia
- District: Dzhidinsky District
- Time zone: UTC+8:00

Dede-Ichyotuy (Russian: Дэдэ-Ичётуй; Buryat: Дээдэ Үшөөтэй, Deede Üshöötei) is a rural locality (a selo) in Dzhidinsky District, Republic of Buryatia, Russia. The population was 1,054 as of 2017. There are 41 streets.

== Geography ==
Dede-Ichyotuy is located 22 km northeast of Petropavlovka (the district's administrative centre) by road. Tsagatuy and Petropavlovka are the nearest rural localities.
