= Vyacheslav Nagovitsyn =

Russian politician

- Вячеслав Наговицын
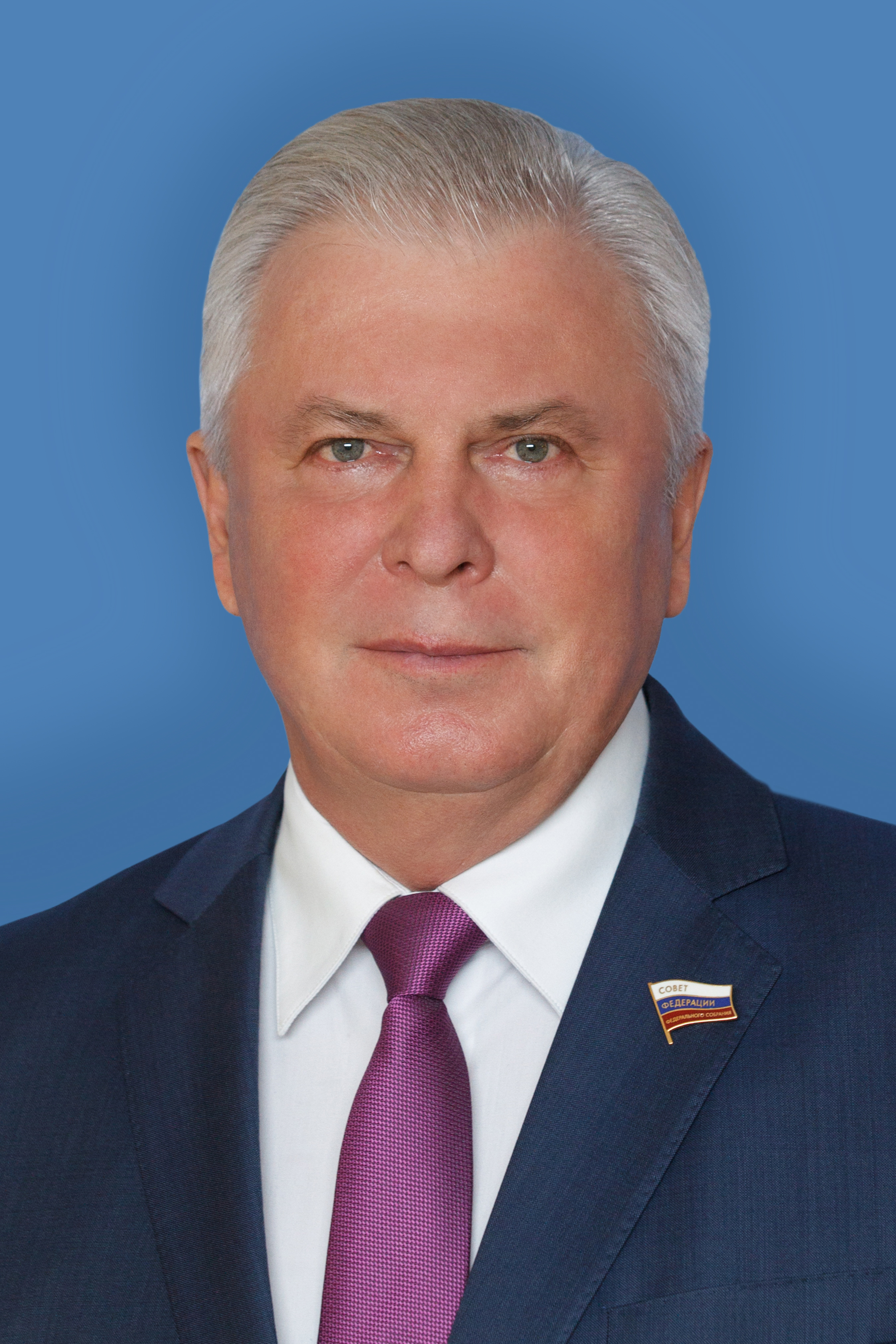
- Official portrait, 2018

Russian Federation Senator from Buryatia
- Incumbent
- Assumed office 22 September 2017 Serving with Alexander Varfolomeev
- Preceded by: Tatyana Mantatova

2nd Head of Buryatia
- In office 10 July 2007 – 7 February 2017
- Deputy: Vladimir Agalov
- Preceded by: Leonid Potapov
- Succeeded by: Alexey Tsydenov

Prime Minister of Tomsk Oblast
- In office December 1999 – July 2007
- Preceded by: Tatyana Mantatova

Personal details
- Born: 2 March 1956 (age 70) Glazov, Udmurt ASSR, Russian SFSR, Soviet Union (now in Udmurtia, Russia)
- Party: United Russia
- Profession: Mechanical Engineer

Vyacheslav Vladimirovich Nagovitsyn (Russian: Вячеслав Владимирович Наговицын; born 2 March 1956) is a Russian politician serving as a senator from Buryatia since 2017. He was previously the Head of Buryatia from 2007 to 2017 and Prime Minister of Tomsk Oblast from 1999 to 2007.

== Early life and education ==
Nagovitsyn was born in Glazov, a village in the Udmurt ASSR of the Russian SFSR, Soviet Union. He moved to Tomsk at a young age.

In 1978, he graduated from Tomsk Polytechnical Institute, specialising in Mechanical Engineering. He had, during university, received higher education in economics.

== Career ==
Nagovistyn took a series of low paying class jobs until he was employed as an engineer. In 1986 he was appointed as the chief engineer of a factory in Tomsk, later becoming the general director.

In December 1999, Nagovistyn was appointed Prime Minister of Tomsk Oblast, the second-highest office after the Governor.

In 2007, by which time Nagovistyn was an experienced statewide politician, he moved to Buryatia to fill in the vacancy created by the stepping down of Leonid Potapov from the office of President of Buryatia. He was duly elected that year and re-elected in 2012 (with the word 'Head' now being used instead of 'President'). He resigned in 2017 after announcing he would not be seeking a third term. His successor Alexey Tsydenov then appointed Nagovistyn to the Federation Council.

A member of the ruling United Russia party, Nagovistyn was placed on the personal sanctions list of the United Kingdom following the launch of the 2022 Russian invasion of Ukraine.

== Personal life ==
Nagovistyn is married and has two sons and one daughter. He also has two grandchildren.
