= Alexey Tsydenov =

Russian politician

- Алексей Цыденов
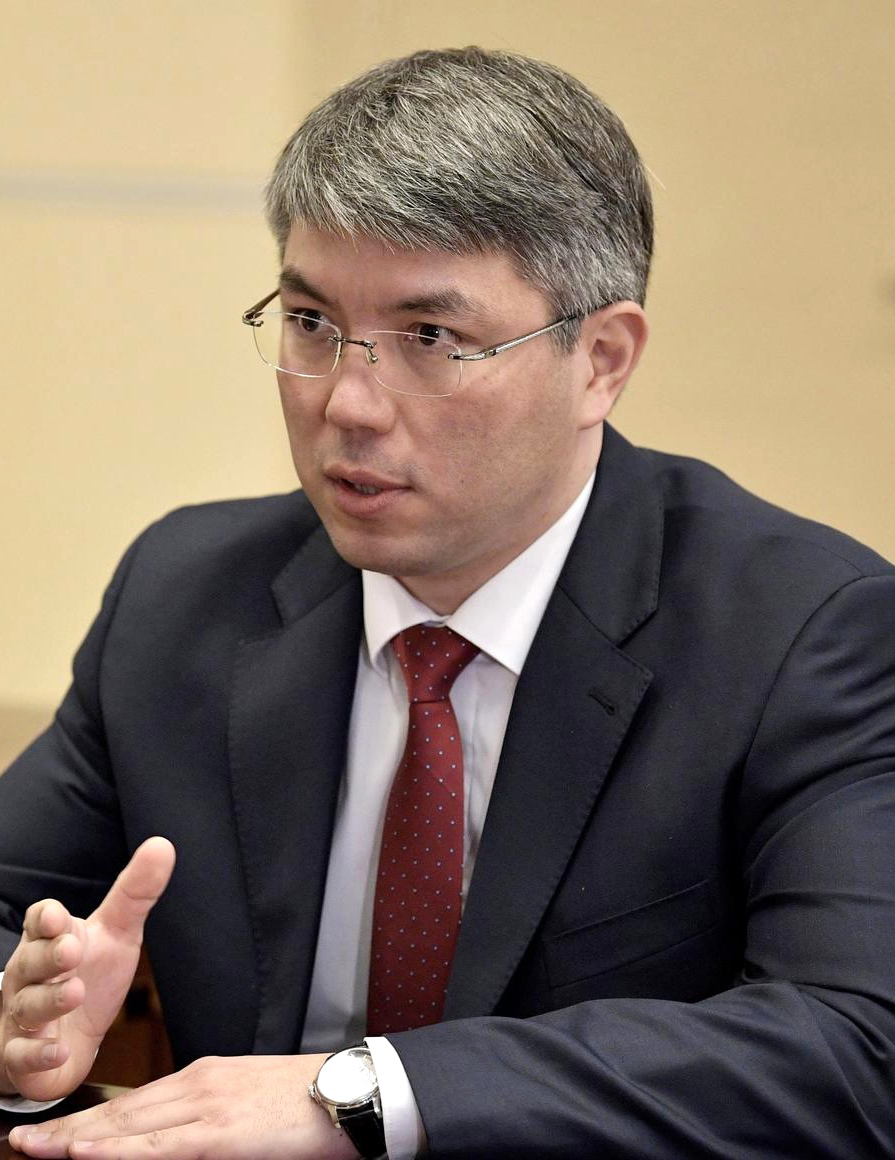
- Tsydenov in 2017

Head of Buryatia
- Incumbent
- Assumed office 7 February 2017
- President: Vladimir Putin
- Preceded by: Vyacheslav Nagovitsyn

Personal details
- Born: 16 March 1976 (age 50) Petrovsk-Zabaykalsky, Chita Oblast, Russian SFSR, Soviet Union
- Party: United Russia

Alexey Sambuevich Tsydenov (Russian: Алексей Самбуевич Цыденов; born 16 March 1976) is a Russian politician who has been the Head of the Buryatia since 7 February 2017. He is the first ethnic Buryat to lead the republic.

On 7 February 2017, Tsydenov was appointed by President Vladimir Putin as acting Head, and then on 10 September 2017, he was elected by popular vote and sworn in on 22 September 2017.

== Early life and education ==
Tsydenov was born in Petrovsk-Zabaykalsky, Chita Oblast, Russian SFSR, Soviet Union. His father was Buryat, while his mother was ethnic Russian. He is a graduate of the Far Eastern State University of Communications. From 1998 to 2001, he worked for the Far Eastern Railway as an accountant, sector chief, and department head. From 2002 to 2004, he was the general director of "Dalneftetrans" LLC, and from 2004 to 2006, he served as the general director of "Far Eastern Transport Group" OJSC.

== Career ==
Between 2006 and 2009, Tsydenov served as deputy director of the railway policy department at the Ministry of Transport. Following that, he held the position of deputy director at the Department of Industry and Infrastructure until 2012. In 2011, he pursued additional education at the Russian Presidential Academy of National Economy and Public Administration.

From December 2011 to May 2012, Tsydenov led the Federal Agency for Railway Transport. Then, from 18 June 2012, to 7 February 2017, he served as Deputy Minister of Transport of the Russian Federation. Additionally, in 2016, he became a member of the board of directors of Russian Railways.

On 7 February 2017, President Vladimir Putin appointed Tsydenov as the acting head of the Republic of Buryatia until the newly elected individual took office.

Tsydenov with Russian President Vladimir Putin in Ulan-Ude, 10 August 2026

On 10 September 2017, Tsydenov was elected Head of the Republic of Buryatia with more than 87% of the vote and was inaugurated on 22 September of the same year, marking the first time an ethnic Buryat assumed leadership of the republic.

In September 2022, Tsydenov was re-elected as Head with a reported 86% of the vote.

In response to his involvement in conscripting citizens to fight in Ukraine, Tsydenov was sanctioned by the United States on 24 February 2023, the first anniversary of Russia's invasion of Ukraine.

Tsydenov's official civil service rank is "Active State Counsellor of the Russian Federation, 2nd class adviser," and he declared a total income of 3.3 million rubles for 2015. He is married and has four children.
