= East Siberia State University of Technology and Management =

Russian higher education institute

- Type: Public
- Established: 1955
- Rector: Professor Vladimir Evgenevich Saktoev
- Location: Ulan-Ude, Republic of Buryatia, Russian Federation; 51.8205°N 107.6408°E
- Campus: Urban
- Website: esstu.ru
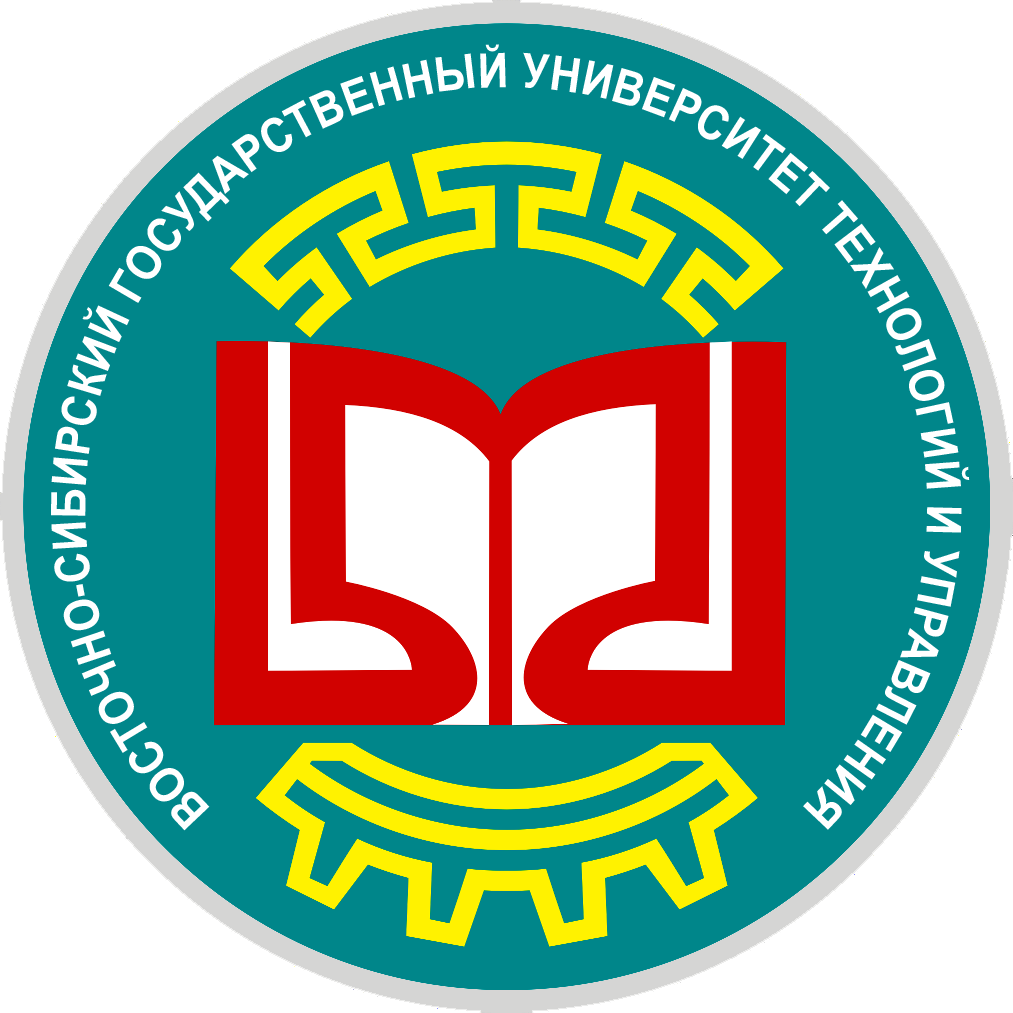

East Siberia State University of Technology and Management (Russian: Восточно-Сибирский государственный университет технологий и управления, ВСГУТУ, ESSUTM) is a regional university located in Ulan-Ude, Buryatia in Russian Federation. On June, 19th, 1962 the Minister of the higher and specialized secondary education of the Russian Soviet Federative Socialist Republic (RSFSR) ordered to organize East Siberian Institute of Technology on the former basis of the technological and building faculties of Buryat Agricultural Institute of the Ministry of Agriculture of the RSFSR. In 1994 the research institute, ESIT, was given the status of the State Technological University.
