= Head of the Republic of Buryatia =

Highest-ranking official in Buryatia, Russia

- Буряад Уласай Толгойлогшо (Buryat); Глава Республики Бурятия (Russian)
- Standard of the head of Buryatia

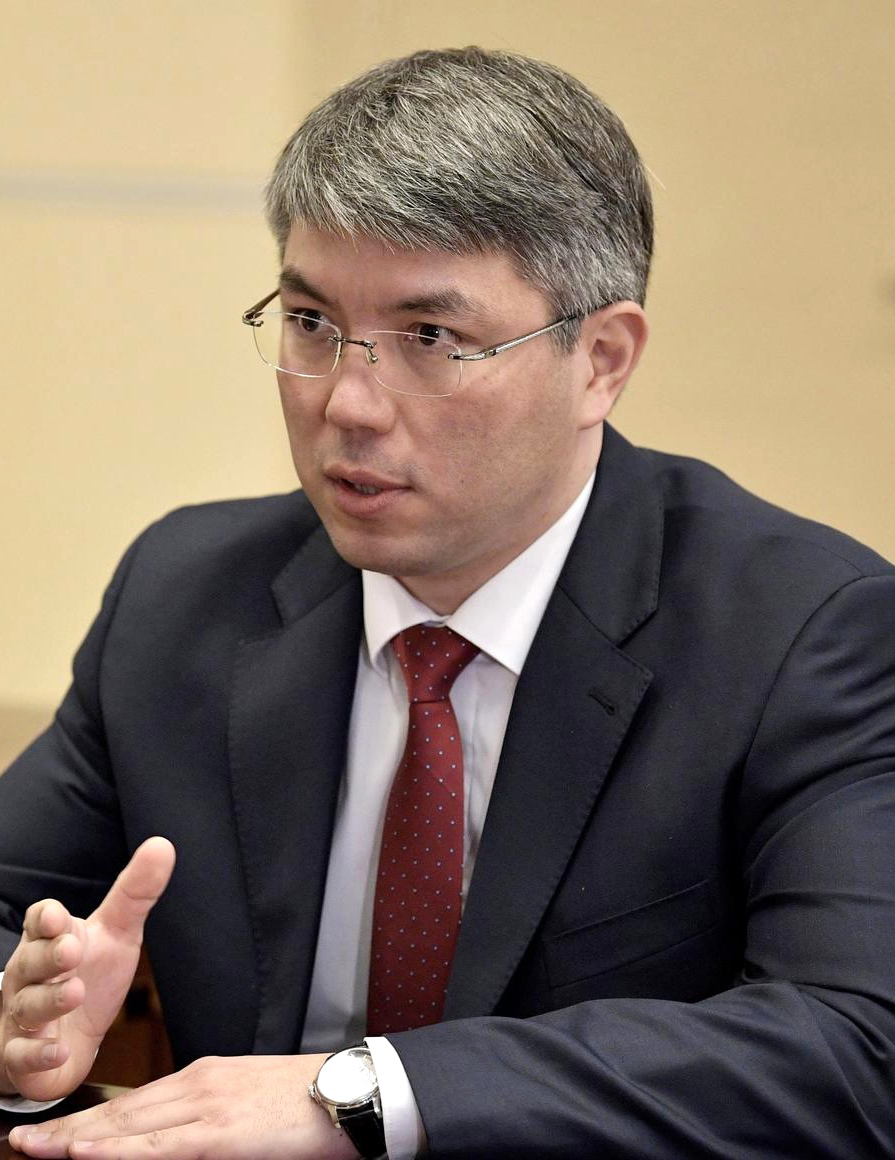
- Incumbent; Alexey Tsydenov since 7 February 2017
- Executive branch of the Republic of Buryatia
- Style: His Excellency; The Honorable
- Type: Governor; Head of state; Head of government
- Residence: Ulan-Ude
- Term length: 5 years, renewable
- Precursor: First Secretaries of the Communist Party of Buryatia
- Formation: 1 July 1994
- First holder: Leonid Potapov
- Website: Official website

The head of the Republic of Buryatia, (Note: Russian: Глава Республики Бурятия, romanized: Glava Respubliki Buryatiya; Buryat: Буряад Уласай Толгойлогшо, romanized: Burjaad Ulasaj Tolgojlogšo) (formerly president of the Republic of Buryatia), (Note: Russian: Президент Республики Бурятия, romanized: Prezident Respubliki Buryatiya; Buryat: Буряад Уласай Юрэнхылэгшэ, romanized: Burjaad Ulasaj Jurenxylegše) is the highest state office within the Republic of Buryatia, Russia, as it is the head of state and government. Since the dissolution of the Soviet Union, three people have served in this position.

== History of office ==
In October 1991, Leonid Potapov was elected chairman of the Supreme Soviet of Buryatia. He won the 1994 election, becoming the first President of the Republic. On 26 April 2011, the People's Khural (parliament) adopted amendments to the Constitution of Buryatia, renaming the office to the "Head of the Republic" from 2012.

== List of officeholders ==
| No. | Portrait | Name (born–died) | Term of office | | | Political party | Election | Ref. |
| No. | Portrait | Name (born–died) | Took office | Left office | Time in office | Political party | Election | Ref. |
|---|---|---|---|---|---|---|---|---|
| 1 | | Leonid Potapov (1935–2020) | 1 July 1994 | 10 July 2007 | 13 years, 9 days | Communist Party | 1994; 1998 | |
| 1 | | Leonid Potapov (1935–2020) | 1 July 1994 | 10 July 2007 | 13 years, 9 days | Independent | 2002 | |
| 2 | | Vyacheslav Nagovitsyn (born 1956) | 10 July 2007 | 7 February 2017 | 9 years, 212 days | United Russia | 2007 (Note: Appointed by the President of Russia with the consent of the People's Khural.); 2012 | |
| – | | Alexey Tsydenov (born 1976) | 7 February 2017 | 22 September 2017 | 227 days | United Russia | – (Note: Acting.) | |
| 3 | | Alexey Tsydenov (born 1976) | 22 September 2017 | Incumbent | 8 years, 350 days | United Russia | 2017; 2022 | |
