= Leonid Potapov =

Russian politician (1935–2020)

- Леонид Потапов
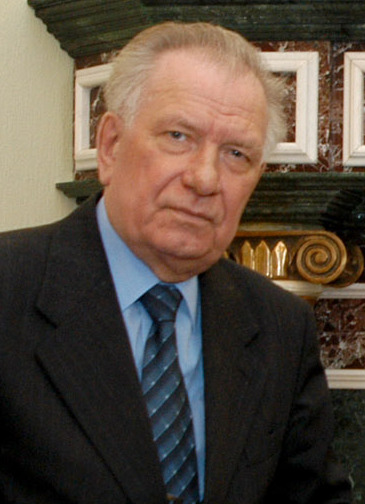
- Potapov in 2004

1st President of Buryatia
- In office 1 July 1994 – 10 July 2007
- Succeeded by: Vyacheslav Nagovitsyn

Chairman of the Supreme Soviet of Buryatia
- In office 21 October 1991 – 1 July 1994
- Preceded by: Sergey Buldayev
- Succeeded by: Mikhail Semyonov (as Chairman of the People's Khural)

Personal details
- Born: 4 July 1935 Uakit, Russian SFSR, Soviet Union
- Died: 12 November 2020 (aged 85) Ulan-Ude, Russia
- Party: Communist Party
- Spouse: Nina Potapova
- Awards

Leonid Vasilyevich Potapov (Russian: Леонид Васильевич Потапов; 4 July 1935 – 12 November 2020) was a Russian politician who served as the Chairman of the Supreme Soviet of Buryatia from August 1991 to 1994, and then President of the Republic in Russia from July 1994 to July 2007. He was reelected three times (in 1994, 1998 and 2002); in 2002 he received 68% of the vote.

== Biography ==
Potapov was born in Uakit, Buryatia. In 1959 he graduated as an Engineer from Khabarovsk Institute of Railway Transport. From January to April 1990 he was nominal Vice President (Vice Chairman of Supreme Council) of Turkmen SSR. In April 1990 he returned to Buryatia and was nominated as a local communist party chief (1st secretary of CPSU Buryatian branch). In October 1991 he became Chairman of the Supreme Council.

He died from COVID-19 on 12 November 2020, aged 85.

== Honours and awards ==
- Order "For Merit to the Fatherland";
  - 3rd class (7 August 2007) - for outstanding contribution to strengthening Russian statehood and many years of diligent work
  - 4th class (11 May 1998) - for outstanding contribution to the socio-economic development of the republic, strengthening friendship and cooperation between nations
- Order of Friendship (26 June 1995) - for services to the state, achievements in work and significant contribution in strengthening friendship and cooperation among peoples and selfless actions in rescuing the dying
- Order of the October Revolution
- Order of the Red Banner of Labour
- Order of the Badge of Honour
- Distinguished Engineer of the Buryat ASSR
- Honorary citizen of the city of Ulan-Ude
- Honorary Professor of the Buryat State University, Modern University for the Humanities, Irkutsk State University, Irkutsk State Technical University and the Plekhanov Russian University of Economics
