= Buryat State University =

University in Buryatia, Russia

Banzarov Buryat State University
- Бурятский государственный университет имени Доржи Банзарова (Buryatskij gosudarstvenny‵j universitet imeni Dorzhi Banzarova)
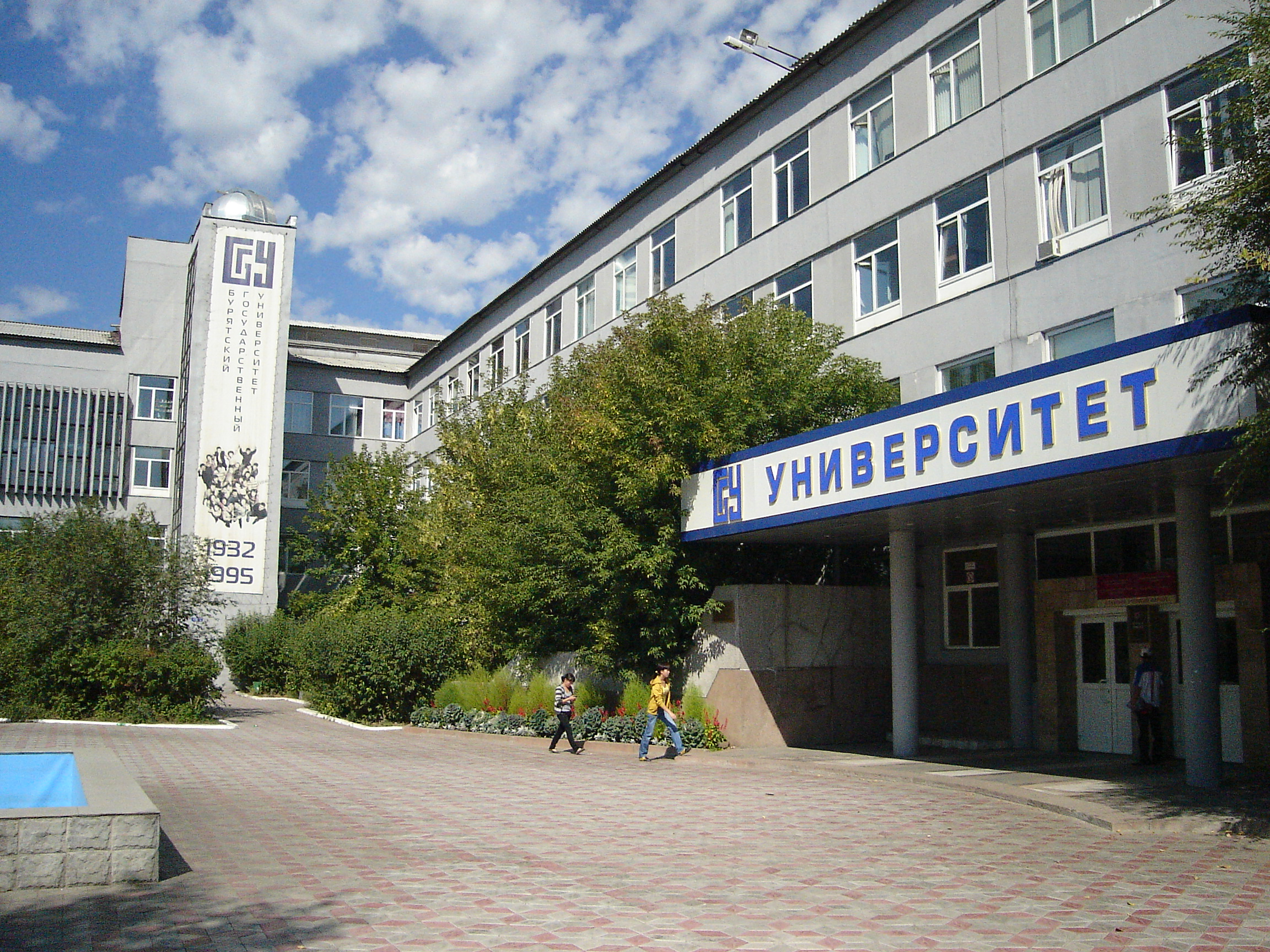
- Type: Public university
- Established: 1932
- Affiliations: UArctic
- Rector: Damdinov Aldar Valerevich
- Students: 12,000
- Location: Ulan-Ude, Russia; 51.8339°N 107.5803°E
- Website: Official website

Buryat State University (Russian: Бурятский государственный университет), officially Dorzhi Banzarov Buryat State University, is an institution of higher education in Siberia and the Russian Far East, located in the city of Ulan-Ude, Buryat Republic, Russia. Courses are taught in Russian and Buryat. It was established in 1932 as the Buryat-Mongolian State Pedagogical Institute, and became a university in 1995. It is a member of the University of the Arctic.

Founded in 1666, Ulan-Ude is situated 5500 km from Moscow, the capital of Russia, and 450 km from Ulaanbaatar.

== History ==
=== History of Buryat State Pedagogical Institute ===
Buryat State Pedagogical Institute (BSPI) was one of the oldest institutes of higher education in Siberia. It was organized by the Council of People's Commissars of the RSFSR of 10 January 1932 on the basis of the Buryat-Mongolian linguistic department of the Irkutsk State Pedagogical Institute. The Buryat-Mongolian State Pedagogical Institute (BMSPI) included four departments: physics and mathematics, natural science, literature and linguistics, and social studies and economics. The first intake, of 146 students, was in autumn 1932.

Twenty-two professors worked at the institute in 1932. The BMSPI was housed in a three-story brick house on the corner of Lenin and Working streets (now Sukhbaatar). The educational building had 10 classrooms and laboratories, and one lecture hall. The first hall of residence was the building of the former House of Farmer, and could accommodate 90 students.

In autumn 1932, the BMSPI opened pedrabfak (faculty for workers) with a four-year period of study for training and admission to the institute for boys and girls with seven- and nine-year school education. In January 1933, the correspondence department was opened. In September 1934, the teachers' institute was opened. It was at the BMSPI and trained teachers for the seven-year schools. After Buryat-Mongolian ASSR was renamed Buryat ASSR in 1958, the Institute was also officially renamed Dorzhi Banzarov Buryat State Pedagogical Institute (BSPI). Buryat Pedagogical Institute ran from 1932 to 1995. More than 95% of the teaching staff of Buryatia, and many educators in Agin-Buryat and Ust-Orda Buryat Autonomous Okrugs, Irkutsk and Chita regions have been graduates of the institute.

=== Establishment of Buryat State University ===
Buryat State University, one of the oldest universities in Siberia, has been formed in accordance with Presidential Decree of 30 September 1995 and Government Decree dated 2 November 1995 on the basis of the Buryat State Pedagogical Institute (founded 1932) and the Buryat branch of Novosibirsk State University in Ulan-Ude.

In 1992 the Buryat branch of NSU was opened in Ulan-Ude. It ran from 1992 to 1995, and was existing in close association with Buryat Science Centre of SB RAS research institutions. After the BSPI and the Buryat branch of NSU were reorganized into Buryat State University, many scientific researchers and scientists of Buryat Science Centre and other research institutions continued to lecture or transferred to the university. As of 1 September 1996, the university was staffed with 655 full professors and instructors, among them were 375 Sc.D. and Ph.D. holders (55,7%).

BSU is a system-building educational institution, training specialists in the fields of education, science, management, economy, healthcare, social services, etc. For decades, BSU has trained more than 80 thousand highly qualified professionals. It is named after the Buryat academic Dorzhi Banzarov.

== Structure ==
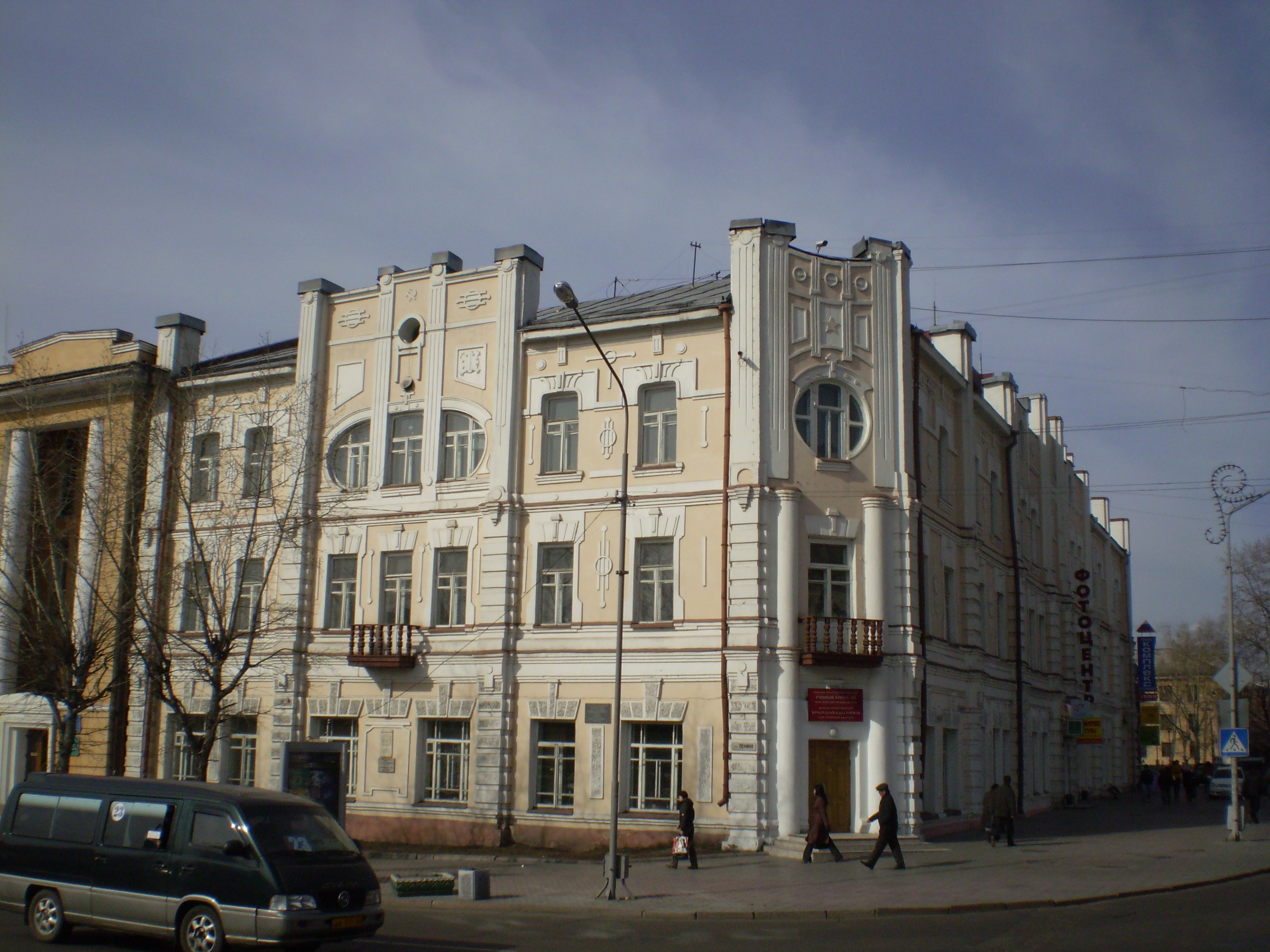
BSU building 3, location of the Faculty of Foreign Languages

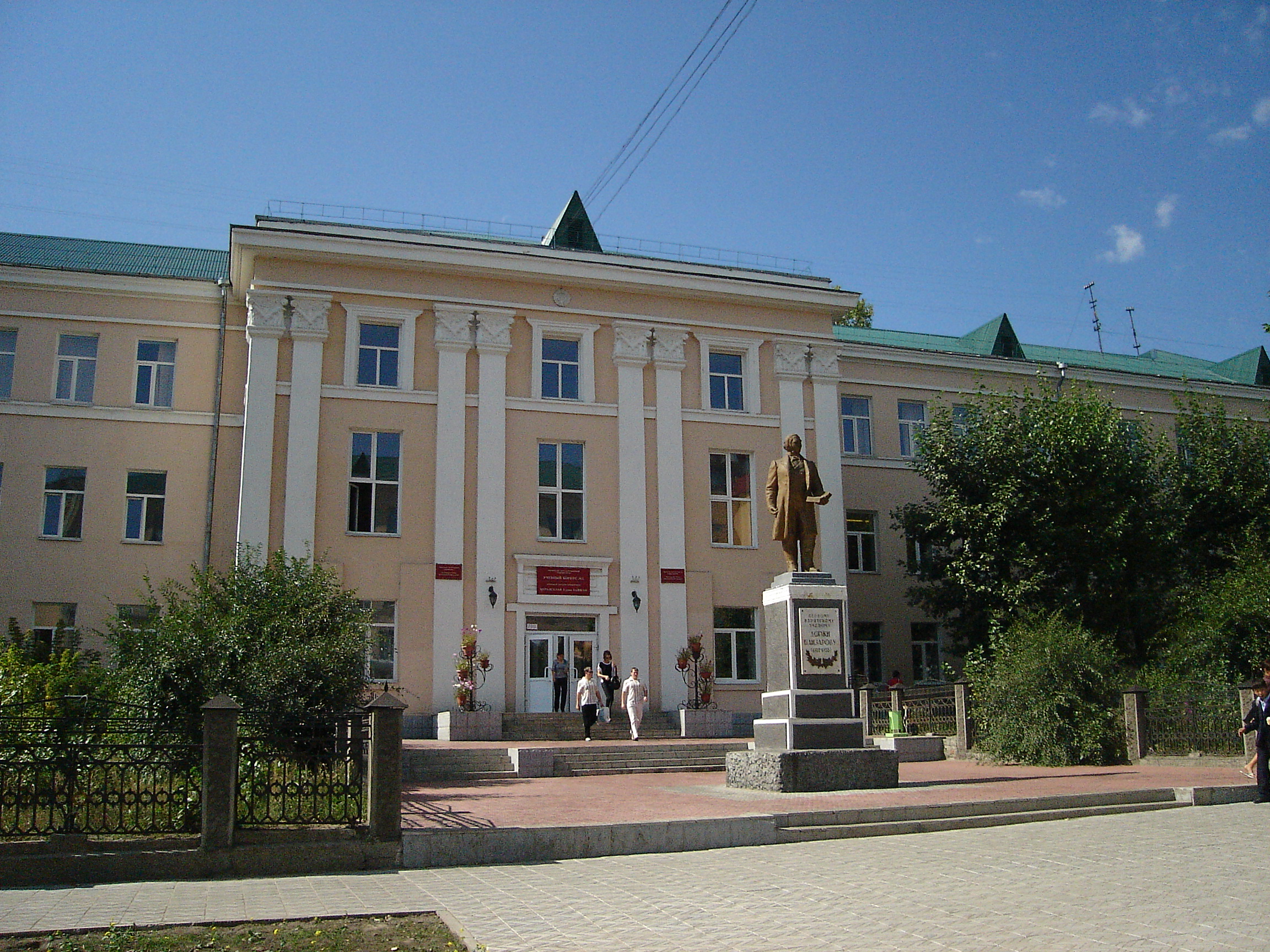
BSU building 1

Buryat State University comprises 8 institutes and BSU College.

=== Institutes ===
- Institute of Mathematics, Physics and Computer Sciences
- Institute of Natural Sciences
- Institute of History and Philology
- Oriental Studies Institute
- Institute of Pedagogy and Psychology
- Institute of Physical Culture, Sports and Tourism
- Institute of Law and Economics
- Medical Institute

=== College ===
- BSU College of post-secondary education

=== Other Structural Units ===
- Institute for Continuous Education
- Institute of Traditional Medicine
- Institute of Inner Asia
- Department of Pre-University Training
- Russian Language Testing Centre for foreigners
- Confucius Institute
- King Sejong Institute
- English Language Testing Centre
- German Language Testing Centre

and others.

== Academics ==
Research at BSU includes information and telecommunications technology and electronics, space and aviation technology, new transportation technology, new materials, ecology and rational nature-usage, and energy-saving technology.

== International links ==
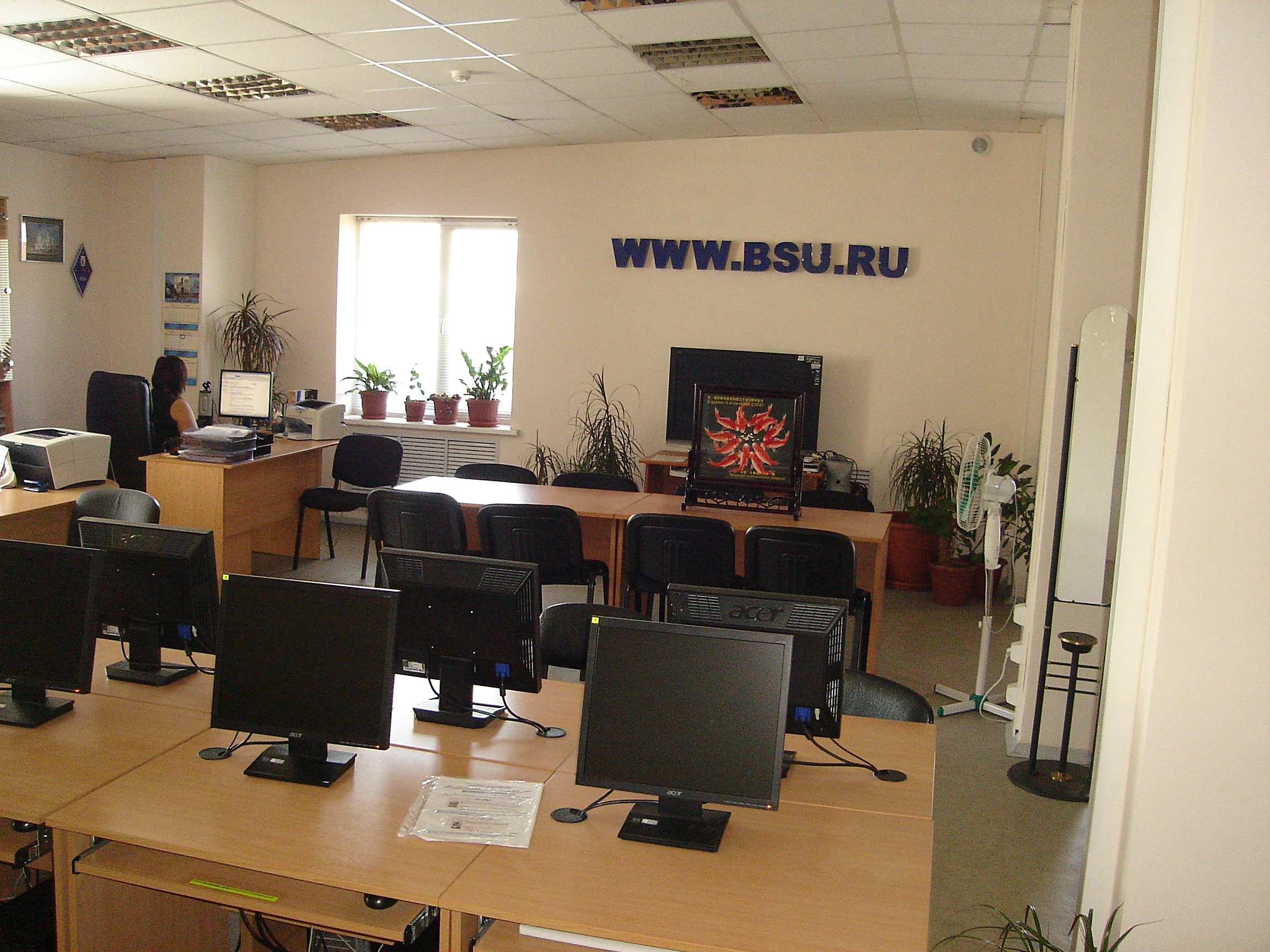
Distance Learning Center of BSU

BSU cooperates with academic and research centres in many countries. Every year, more than 150 international students study at BSU and the university carries out non-commercial students and lecturers' exchange with its foreign partner organizations. The university organises annual Lake Baikal summer camps for foreign students and lecturers.

International students have the opportunity to take courses in the Russian and Buryat languages, in which they can also learn about Russian and local cultures.

BSU students study in partner universities in China, Mongolia, South Korea, Japan, Turkey, Switzerland, Austria, Poland, and Germany.

=== Education for international students ===
The university offers courses of Russian as a foreign language. The department "Russian as a Foreign Language" was founded in September 2002 at the Philology Faculty. There is a Master's programme for the direction "Philology" (Russian language/Russian literature) for international students.
