= Buryatia =

First-level administrative division of Russia

Republic of Buryatia Республика Бурятия (Russian)
- Republic

Other transcription(s)
  - Buryat: Буряад Улас
  - Romanization: Buryaad Ulas
- Flag Coat of arms
- Anthem: Anthem of the Republic of Buryatia
- Coordinates: 53°48′N 109°20′E
- Country: Russia
- Federal district: Far Eastern
- Economic region: Far Eastern
- Capital: Ulan-Ude

Government
  - Body: People's Khural
  - Head: Alexey Tsydenov
  - Member of the State Duma: Vyacheslav Damdintsurunov
  - Senators: Vyacheslav Nagovitsyn; Alexander Varfolomeev

Area
  - Total: 351,334 km^{2} (135,651 sq mi)

Population (2021 Census)
  - Total: ▲978,588: 32.5% Buryats; 63.9% Russians; 0.5% Soyots; 0.4% Tatars; 0.3% Evenks; 0.2% Ukrainians; 2.1% other
  - Estimate (2018): 984,511
  - Rank: 54th
  - Density: 2.79/km^{2} (7.2/sq mi)

GDP (nominal, 2024)
  - Total: ₽504 billion (US$5.91 billion)
  - Per capita: ₽517,756 (US$6,075.45)
- Time zone: UTC+8 (MSK+5)
- ISO 3166 code: RU-BU
- License plates: 03
- OKTMO ID: 81000000
- Official languages: Russian; Buryat
- Website: egov-buryatia.ru

Buryatia, (Note: UK: /bʊrˈjætiə/ buurr-YAT-ee-ə, US: /bʊrˈjɑːtiə/ buurr-YAHT-ee-ə; Russian: Бурятия, romanized: Burjatija, IPA: [bʊˈrʲætʲɪjə]; Buryat: Буряад Улас, romanized: Buryaad Ulas, IPA: [bʊˈrʲaːt ˈʊlə̆s]) officially the Republic of Buryatia, (Note: Russian: Республика Бурятия, romanized: Respublika Burjatija, IPA: [rʲɪˈspublʲɪkə bʊˈrʲætʲɪjə]; Buryat: Буряад Республика, romanized: Buryaad Riespublika, IPA: [bʊˈrʲaːt rʲɪsˈpublʲɪkə]) is a republic of Russia located in the Russian Far East. Formerly part of the Siberian Federal District, it has been administered as part of the Far Eastern Federal District since 2018. To its north lie Irkutsk Oblast and Lake Baikal, the deepest lake in the world; Zabaykalsky Krai to the east; Tuva to the west and Mongolia to the south. Its capital is the city of Ulan-Ude. It has an area of 351,300 square kilometers (135,600 sq mi) with a population of 978,588 (2021 Census). It is home to the indigenous Buryats.

== Geography ==
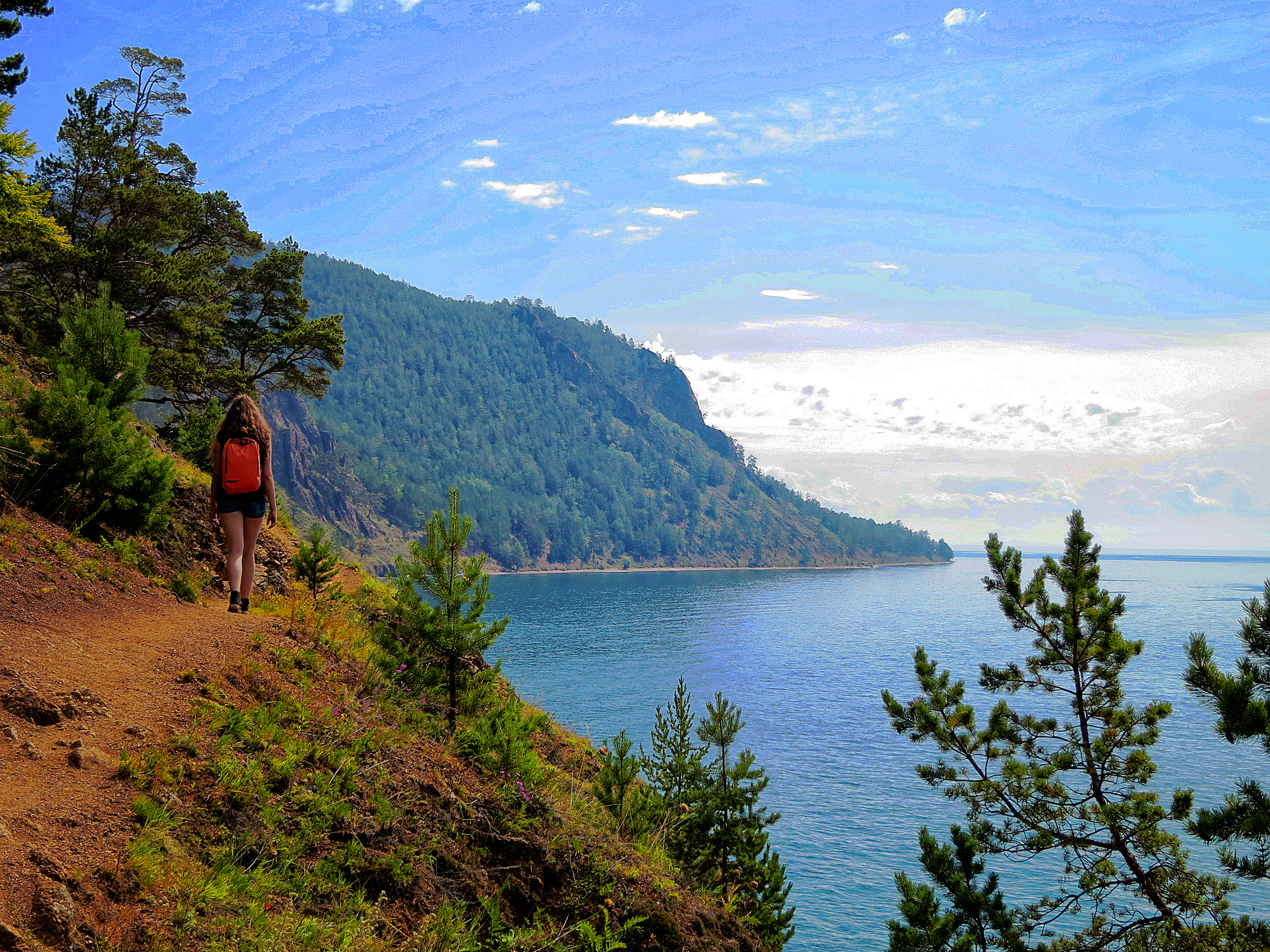
View of Lake Baikal in Buryatia

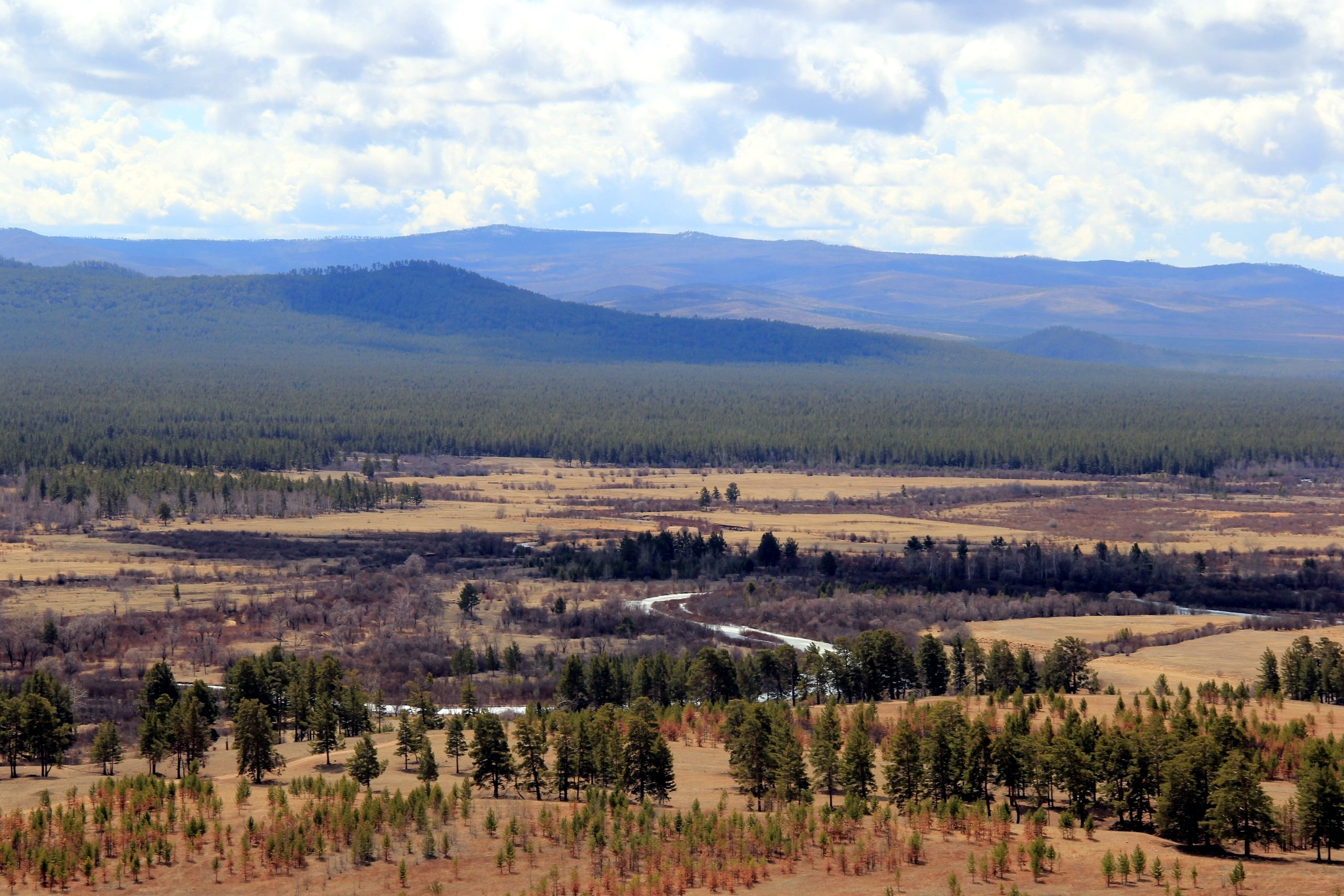
View of the valley of the Uda near the village of Khorinsk

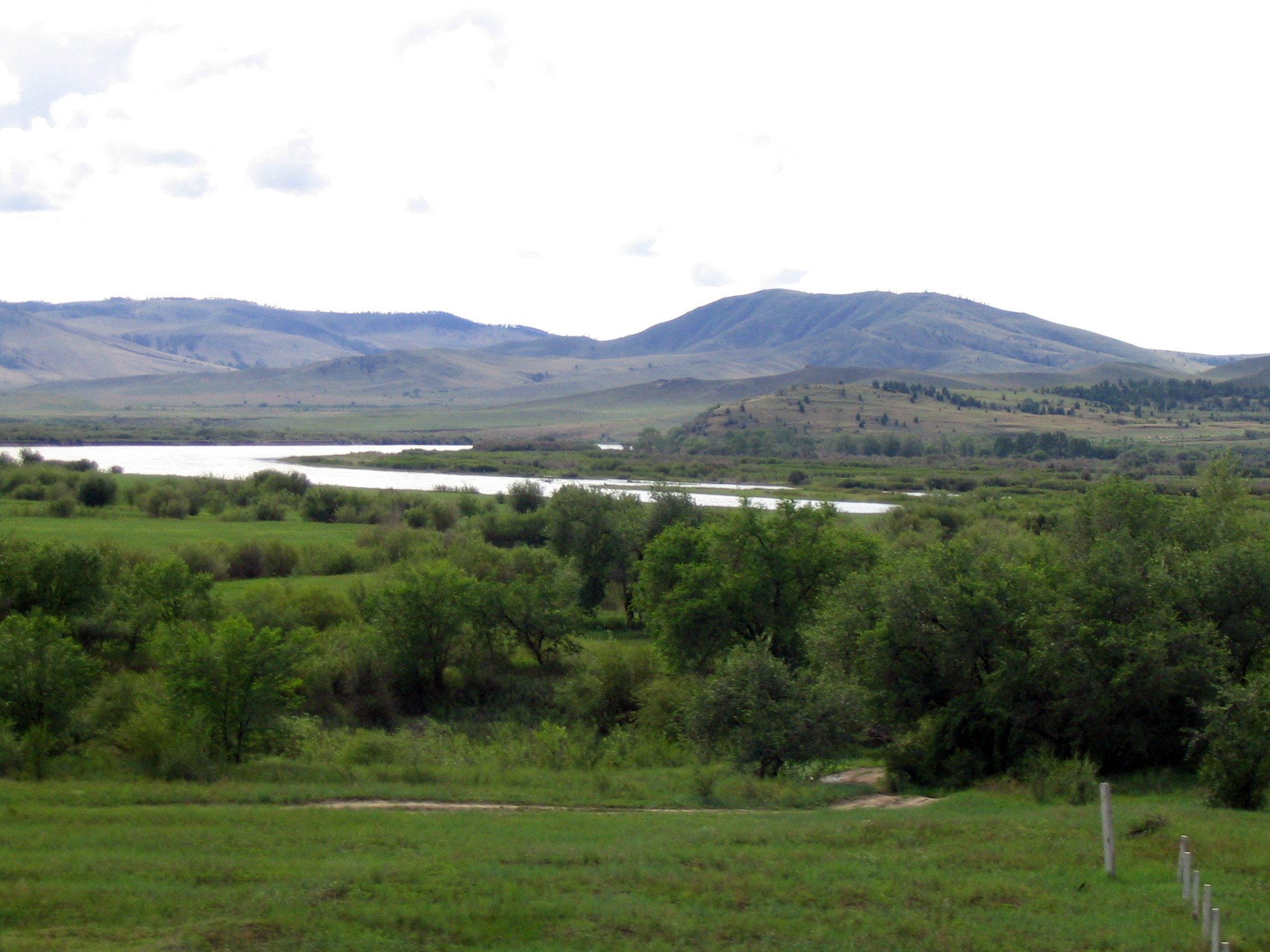
Landscape of southern Buryatia

The republic is located in the south-central region of Siberia along the eastern shore of Lake Baikal.

- Area: 351,300 square kilometers (135,600 sq mi)
- Borders:
  - Internal: Irkutsk Oblast (W/NW/N), Zabaykalsky Krai (NE/E/SE/S), Tuva (W)
  - International: Mongolia (Bulgan Province, Khövsgöl Province and Selenge Province) (S/SE)
  - Water: Lake Baikal (N)
- Highest point: Mount Munku-Sardyk (3,491 m (11,453 ft))

=== Rivers ===
Major rivers include:

- Barguzin River
- Irkut River
- Kitoy River
- Oka River
- Selenga River
- Uda River
- Upper Angara River
- Vitim River

=== Lakes ===
- Lake Baikal – 60% of the lake's shoreline is in Buryatia.
- Lake Gusinoye
- Baunt
- Busani
- Kapylyushi
- Yeravna-Khorga Lake System

=== Mountains ===
Over 80% of the republic's territory is located in the mountainous region, including the Baikal Mountains on the northern shores of Lake Baikal, the Ulan-Burgas east of the lake, and the Selenga Highlands in the south near the Mongolia–Russia border.

=== Natural resources ===
The republic's natural resources include gold, tungsten, zinc, uranium, and more.

=== Climate ===
- Average annual temperature: 0 °C (32 °F)
- Average January temperature: −17 °C (1 °F)
- Average July temperature: +25 °C (77 °F)
- Average annual precipitation: 244 millimeters (9.6 in)

The climate varies, with the capital Ulan-Ude having a humid steppe climate and the north with a humid continental climate.

== History ==
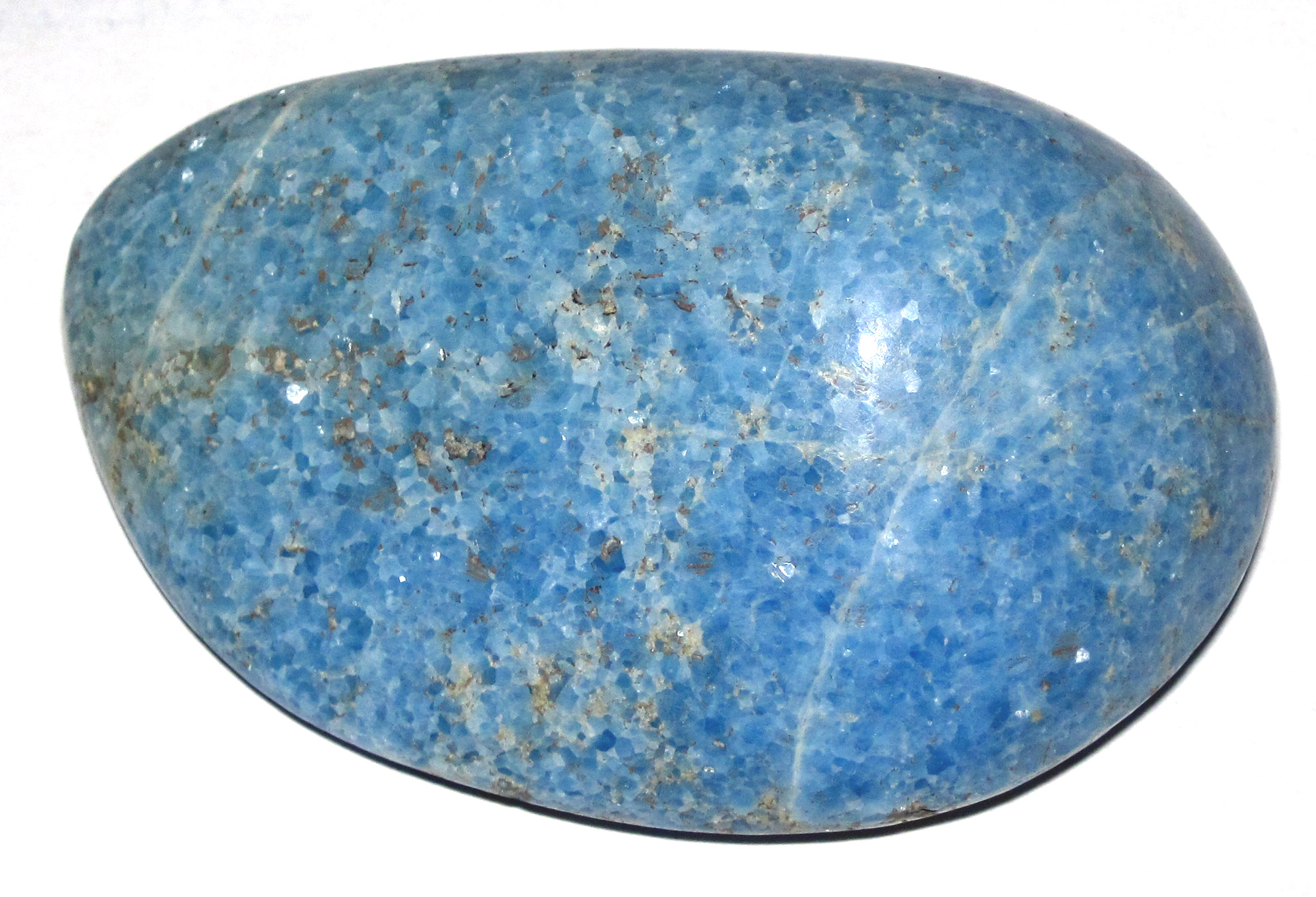
Unusual blue diopsidite skarn from the Dovyren Highlands, Buryatia

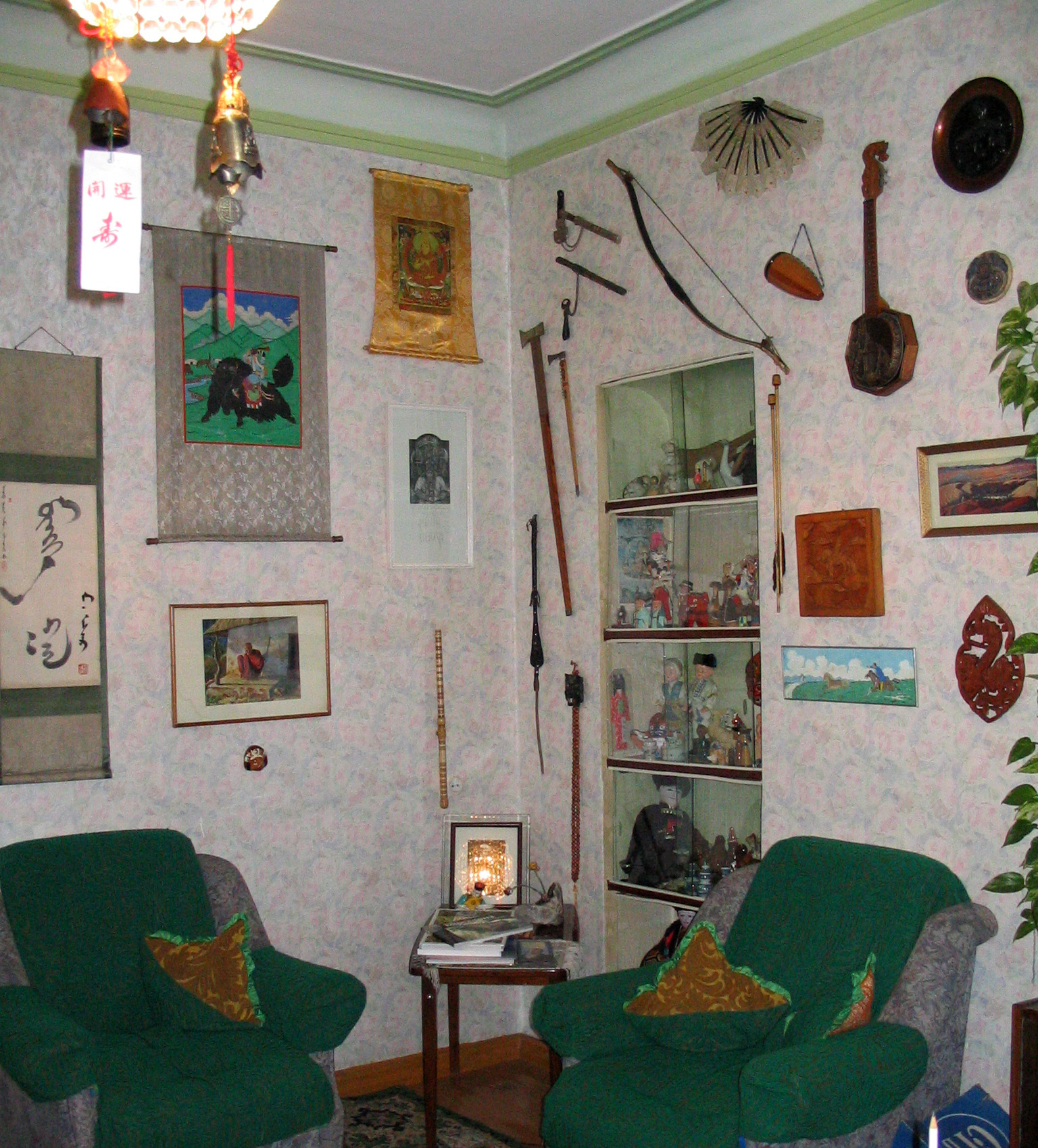
Modern Buryat home with musical instruments, scrolls, and weapons typical of Buryatia

Mongolian people have lived in the area around Lake Baikal since the fifth century, with Mongolic-related Slab Grave cultural monuments found in the Baikal region. Over time, the Mongolic peoples of the region developed into distinct groups, one of which became the Buryats. Further divisions arose between those Buryats living on the western shore of Lake Baikal – which had better land for agriculture – and those in the east, who practised nomadism more regularly and continued to reside in moveable felt yurts. As a result of the superior farmland, the western side of Lake Baikal was settled by European peasants during the time of the Russian Empire; consequently, western Buryats were more exposed to, and influenced by, the culture, religions and economy of their European neighbours, whereas eastern Buryats maintained closer ties to other Mongolic peoples, Buddhism and Asian civilisations.

The territory of Buryatia has been governed by the Xiongnu Empire (209 BC – 93 AD), the Mongolian Xianbei state (93–234), the Rouran Khaganate (330–555), the First Turkic Khaganate (552–603), the Eastern Turkic Khaganate (682–744), the Tang dynasty (647–784), the Uyghur Khaganate (744–840), the Yenisei Kyrgyz Khaganate (840–1208), the Mongol Empire (1206–1368) and the Northern Yuan (1368–1635). Medieval Mongol tribes such as the Merkit, Bayads, Barga Mongols and Tümeds inhabited Buryatia.

=== Imperial Russia ===
Cossacks and other tsarist officials began moving eastward into the western Buryat lands in 1625, where they estimated that 30,000 Buryats were living in south‑eastern Siberia, collecting tribute from other small Siberian tribes. The Buryats resisted incorporation into the Russian Empire's tribute system (yasak), which demanded a yearly supply of furs; it was not until the 1680s that the last of the eastern Buryat lands were forced to participate in the yasak system. In 1666, the fort of Udinskoye was founded. This area later became known as Verkhneudinsk – in 1934 it was renamed Ulan‑Ude, the present‑day capital of Buryatia.

From 1727, the town of Kyakhta served as the border crossing for the Kyakhta trade between Russia and China. Kyakhta's founder, the Serb Sava Vladislavich, established it as a trading post between Russia and the Qing Empire. The reforms of Mikhail Speransky in 1820 established indirect rule over Buryatia by codifying local clan leaders as official members of the "steppe duma", thereby incorporating them into the existing imperial government.

Buddhism was recognised as an official religion of the Russian Empire by Empress Elizabeth in 1741, and the first Pandito Khambo Lama – the spiritual leader of the Buryat Buddhists – was elected in 1764. The first person to serve in this role was Damba Dorzha Zaiaev (1711–1776). At the time of the Bolshevik Revolution, Dashi-Dorzho Itigilov served as the 12th Pandito Khambo Lama of Eastern Siberia from 1911 to 1917. Itigilov stepped down in 1917 at the time of the revolution and later encouraged his students to flee to Mongolia, though he refused to flee himself.

=== Soviet Buryatia ===
National movements, including that of Buryatia, began to foment after the February Revolution in 1917. From March 1917, the leading Buryat intelligentsia organized a number of conferences in cities such as Petrograd, Chita, Irkutsk, and Verkhneudinsk (present-day Ulan-Ude) and invited representatives from Buryat administrative districts of the Irkutsk and Transbaikalia regions. The culmination of these conferences was the first All-Buryat Congress in 23–25 April 1917 in Chita, where activists advocated for a self-governing Buryat Autonomous Region, based on the models of Poland and Finland, with an elected body, the Buryat National Duma, that all Buryats, men and women, over the age of 18 and without criminal convictions, would participate in. This Duma would elect a permanent executive body, the Buryat National committee, which would take on responsibilities such as organizing the elections, assembling the Buryat Duma, and publishing works in the Buryat language. Among other topics discussed at the Congress were the establishment of an Education Council to create Buryat schools, trained educators, and curricula that included the history of the Buryats and Mongols and Buryat studies.

After the November Revolution in 1917, the Buryats bid for independence was complicated by the arrival of a Japanese expeditionary force into Buryatia in 1918. The Buryat national leaders saw the Japanese as potential and critical allies in assisting the independence movement, but the cooperation ultimately failed due to the conflicting agendas. The Red Army advanced in Buryatia in 1920 and continued to Outer Mongolia in 1921. Attracted to the promises of self-determination and territorial autonomy by the Bolsheviks, and having lost the cooperation of the Japanese, the Buryat leaders embraced the idea of building a Buryat nation with the new Soviet state. In 1923, the Buryat Autonomous Soviet Socialist Republic (Buryat: Буряадай Автономито Совет Социалис Республика; Russian: Бурятская Автономная Советская Социалистическая Республика) was created as a result of the merger of State of Buryat and Buryat Oblast and promised territorial autonomy. In 1929, a revolt was suppressed in Buryatia, caused by collectivisation and repression of Buddhism. In 1937, Aga Buryatia and Ust-Orda Buryatia were detached from the Buryat-Mongolian ASSR and merged with Chita and Irkutsk Oblasts, respectively. In 1958, the name "Mongol" was removed from the name of the republic and simply became the Autonomous Soviet Socialist Republic of Buryatia within the vast multi-ethnic, diverse Soviet Union.

The Ivolginsky Datsan was opened in 1945 as the only Buddhist spiritual centre of the USSR, home to the Central Spiritual Board of Buddhists of the USSR, the state-controlled sangha.

The Buryat intelligentsia were active throughout Buryatia and beyond, into Tibet and Mongolia. At the turn of the 20th century, Buryats leaders, such as Batu-dalai Ochirov and Mikhail Bogdanov, began actively writing political articles about the threat to Buryatia and Buryat existence from Russia. Despite their noted influence from 1900 to 1930, most of them were purged, killed outright or sent to concentration camps, in the 1930s.

The leader of the Buryat ASSR from 1962 to 1984 was Andrei Urupkheevich Modogoev. In the 1970s, Soviet authorities began two major industrial projects in Buryatia: the Gusinoozerskii power station to the south of Ulan-Ude and the construction of the Baikal–Amur Mainline railway in northern Buryatia. The construction of both projects, particularly the railway, required recruiting campaigns to bring workers from other parts of the country to Buryatia. Towns developed along the railroad, and the urban population in northern Buryatia doubled between 1979 and 1989. In addition to the Russians who moved to Buryatia for work, Buryats from other parts of southern Siberia also migrated to the Buryat ASSR, particularly Ulan-Ude and other cities for jobs and educational opportunities. Prior to World War II, less than 10% of Buryats lived in urban areas, compared to almost half at the time of the fall of the Soviet Union. By 1989, one-third of the Buryat population of the Buryat ASSR was living in Ulan-Ude.

=== Post-Soviet Buryatia ===
The Buryat ASSR declared its sovereignty in 1990 and adopted the name Republic of Buryatia in 1992. However, it remained an autonomous republic within the Russian Federation. On 11 July 1995 Buryatia signed a power-sharing agreement with the federal government, granting it autonomy. This agreement was abolished on 15 February 2002.

Following the dissolution of the Soviet Union, autonomous republics such as Buryatia did not have the right to secede. However they retained considerable autonomy, with a separate legislature and president. However this autonomy has been curtailed following the 2004 law passed by Vladimir Putin that decreed regional governors and presidents were to be appointed, rather than directly elected.

== Politics ==
Russian President Vladimir Putin shaking hands with a soldier, alongside the Head of the Republic of Buryatia Alexey Tsydenov, in Ulan-Ude, 10 August 2026

The head of the republic is the Head (formerly President), who is elected by popular vote for a four‑year term. Between 2004 and 2012, the head of Buryatia—like all other regional heads in Russia—was appointed directly by the Russian president.

From 1991 to 2007, the post was held by Leonid Vasilyevich Potapov. He was first elected on 1 July 1994, re‑elected in 1998 with 63.25 per cent of the vote, and elected once more on 23 June 2002, securing over 67 per cent. Before the introduction of direct elections, Potapov served as Chairman of the Supreme Soviet of the Republic, at that time the highest office in the region.

The present Head of the Republic is Alexey Tsydenov, who was elected by popular vote on 10 September 2017. He had been appointed acting Head in February 2017 by the Russian president, Vladimir Putin.

The republic's parliament is the People's Khural, whose 66 deputies are elected every five years. The assembly is currently controlled by the country's ruling party, United Russia, which holds 45 seats. Vladimir Anatolyevich Pavlov has served as Chairman of the People's Khural since September 2019.

The Republic's Constitution was adopted on 22 February 1994.

In the 2024 Russian presidential election, which independent observers and opposition figures described as rigged and fraudulent, President Vladimir Putin won 87.96 per cent of the vote in Buryatia.

== Administrative divisions ==
As of 2013, Buryatia is divided into 21 districts, 6 cities or towns, 16 urban-type settlements and 238 selsoviets and somons.

== Demographics ==
Population: 972,021 (2010 census); 981,238 (2002 census); 1,041,119 (1989 Soviet census).

=== Settlements ===
Largest cities or towns in Buryatia 2010 Russian Census
Rank		Administrative division	Pop.
1	Ulan-Ude	City of republic significance of Ulan-Ude	404,426
2	Severobaykalsk	Town of republic significance of Severobaykalsk	24,929
3	Gusinoozyorsk	Selenginsky District	24,582
4	Kyakhta	Kyakhtinsky District	20,041
5	Selenginsk	Kabansky District	14,546
6	Zakamensk	Zakamensky District	11,524
7	Onokhoy	Zaigrayevsky District	10,689
8	Taksimo	Muysky District	9,438
9	Bichura	Bichursky District	9,145
10	Khorinsk	Khorinsky District	8,138

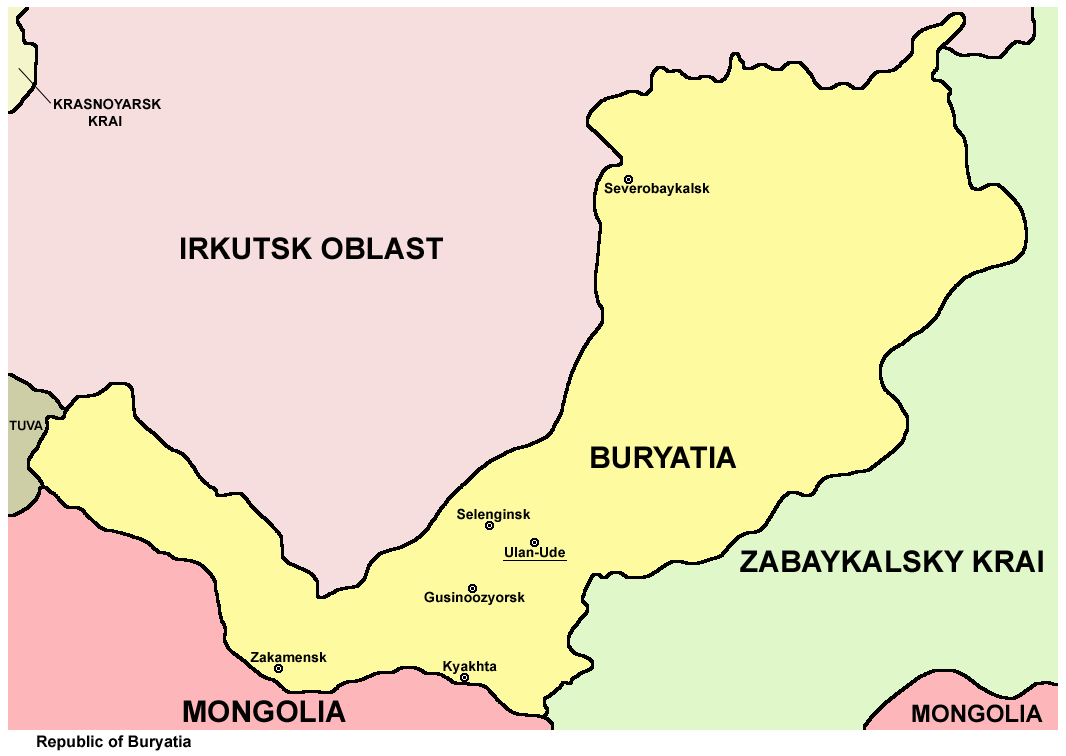
Map of Buryatia.

Historical population
Year	Pop.	±%
1926	388,900	—
1939	545,766	+40.3%
1959	673,326	+23.4%
1970	812,251	+20.6%
1979	900,812	+10.9%
1989	1,041,119	+15.6%
2002	981,238	−5.8%
2010	972,021	−0.9%
2021	978,588	+0.7%
Source: Census data

Census date	1926	1939	1959	1970	1979	1989	2002	2010
Total population	491,236	545,766	673,326	812,251	899,398	1,038,252	981,238	972,021
Average annual population growth				+1.7%	+1.1%	+1.5%	−0.4%	−0.1%
Males	248,513						467,984	
Females	242,723						513,254	
Females per 1000 males	977						1,097	
Proportion urban	9.3%						59.6%	
Territory (km^{2})	368,392	351,334	351,334	351,334	351,334	351,334	351,334	351,334
Population density/km^{2}	1.3	1.6	1.9	2.3	2.6	3.0	2.8	2.8

=== Vital statistics ===
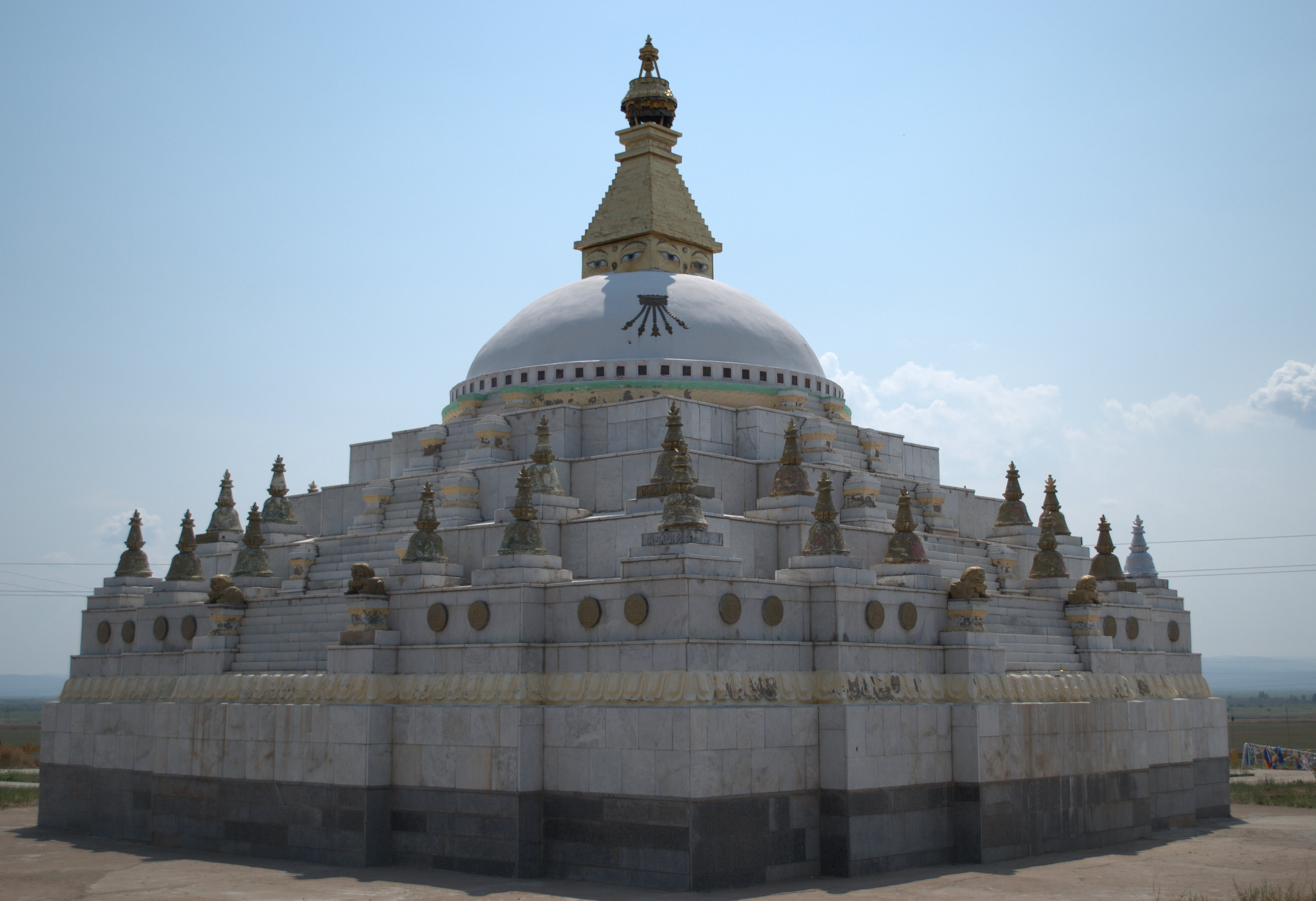
Dzharun Khashor, the largest stupa in the Republic of Buryatia.

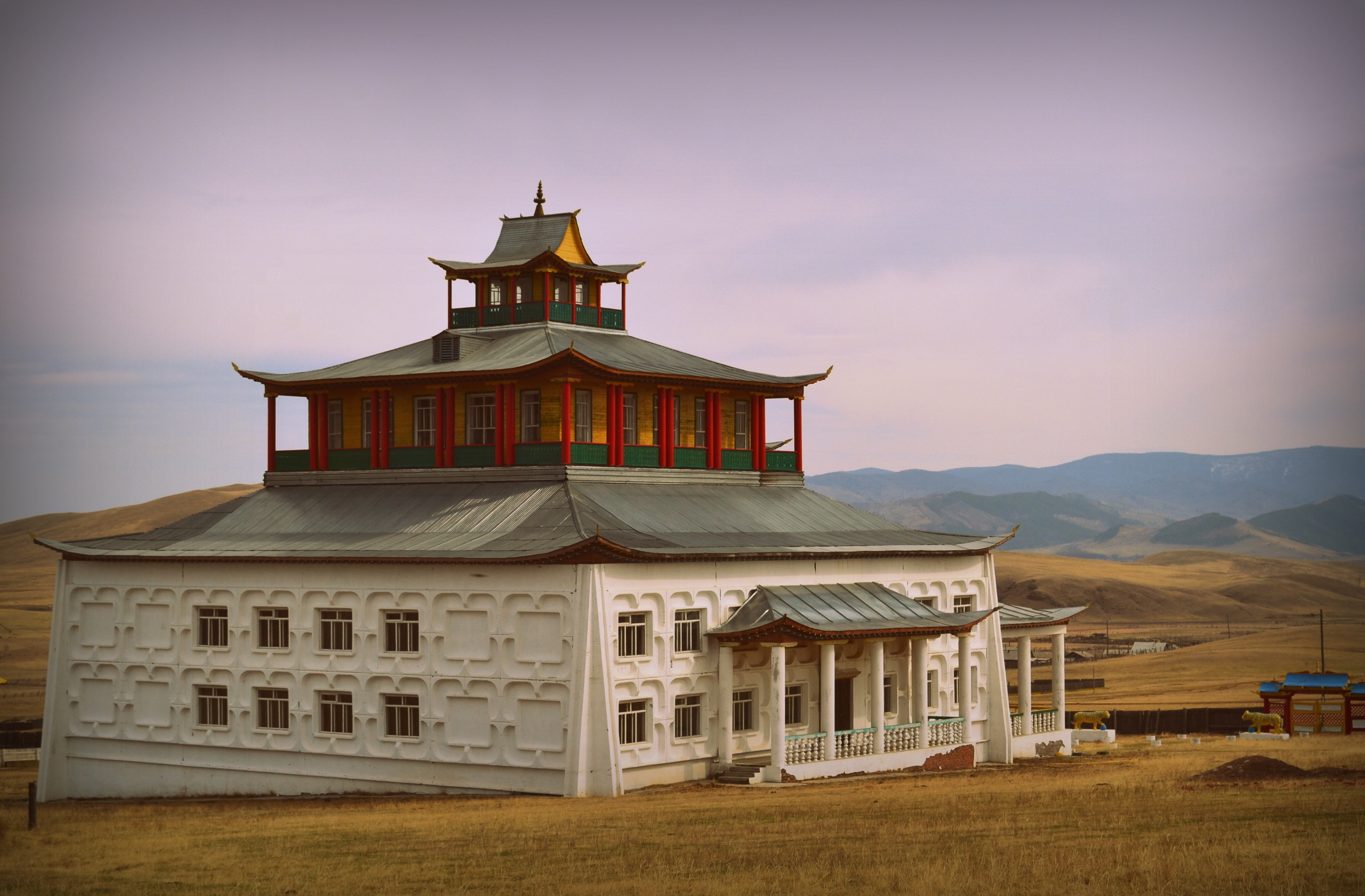
Buddhist temple in Gegetuy.

Source: Russian Federal State Statistics Service

Year	Average population (thousands)	Live births	Deaths	Natural change	Crude birth rate (per 1000)	Crude death rate (per 1000)	Natural change (per 1000)	Fertility rates
1970	816	14,766	6,301	8,465	18.1	7.7	10.4	
1975	862	17,751	7,586	10,165	20.6	8.8	11.8	
1980	921	19,859	8,734	11,125	21.6	9.5	12.1	
1985	993	23,975	9,529	14,446	24.1	9.6	14.5	
1990	1,050	19,185	9,602	9,583	18.3	9.1	9.1	2.18
1991	1,052	16,868	9,753	7,115	16.0	9.3	6.8	2.03
1992	1,049	13,944	10,347	3,597	13.3	9.9	3.4	1.87
1993	1,043	11,981	12,388	−407	11.5	11.9	−0.4	1.65
1994	1,039	12,327	13,650	−1,323	11.9	13.1	−1.3	1.66
1995	1,035	12,311	12,588	−277	11.9	12.2	−0.3	1.60
1996	1,031	12,159	12,441	−282	11.8	12.1	−0.3	1.57
1997	1,025	11,555	12,111	−556	11.3	11.8	−0.5	1.51
1998	1,017	11,746	11,481	265	11.6	11.3	0.3	1.53
1999	1,009	11,468	13,114	−1,646	11.4	13.0	−1.6	1.42
2000	1,001	11,654	13,155	−1,501	11.6	13.1	−1.5	1.42
2001	992	11,678	13,858	−2,180	11.8	14.0	−2.2	1.44
2002	983	12,830	14,404	−1,574	13.1	14.7	−1.6	1.52
2003	977	13,177	15,056	−1,879	13.5	15.4	−1.9	1.51
2004	973	13,399	14,868	−1,469	13.8	15.3	−1.5	1.49
2005	969	13,551	15,144	−1,593	14.0	15.6	−1.6	1.41
2006	966	14,193	13,930	263	14.7	14.4	0.3	1.41
2007	965	15,460	12,802	2,658	16.0	13.3	2.8	1.60
2008	966	16,372	12,948	3,424	16.9	13.4	3.5	1.68
2009	968	16,729	12,466	4,263	17.3	12.9	4.4	2.03
2010	972	16,535	12,386	4,149	17.0	12.7	4.3	1.99
2011	972	16,507	12,299	4,208	17.0	12.7	4.3	2.03
2012	972	17,006	12,064	4,942	17.5	12.4	5.1	2.14
2013	973	17,108	11,479	5,629	17.6	11.8	5.8	2.21
2014	976	17,093	11,182	5,911	17.5	11.5	6.0	2.26
2015	980	16,981	11,152	5,829	17.3	11.4	5.9	2.28
2016	983	16,128	11,047	5,081	16.4	11.2	5.2	2.21(e)
2017	984	14,315	10,445	3,870	14.5	10.6	3.9	
2018	984	13,892	10,347	3,545	14.1	10.5	3.6	
2019		12,471	10,844	1,627	12.7	11.0	1.7	
2020		12,682	11,786	896	12.9	12.0	0.9	

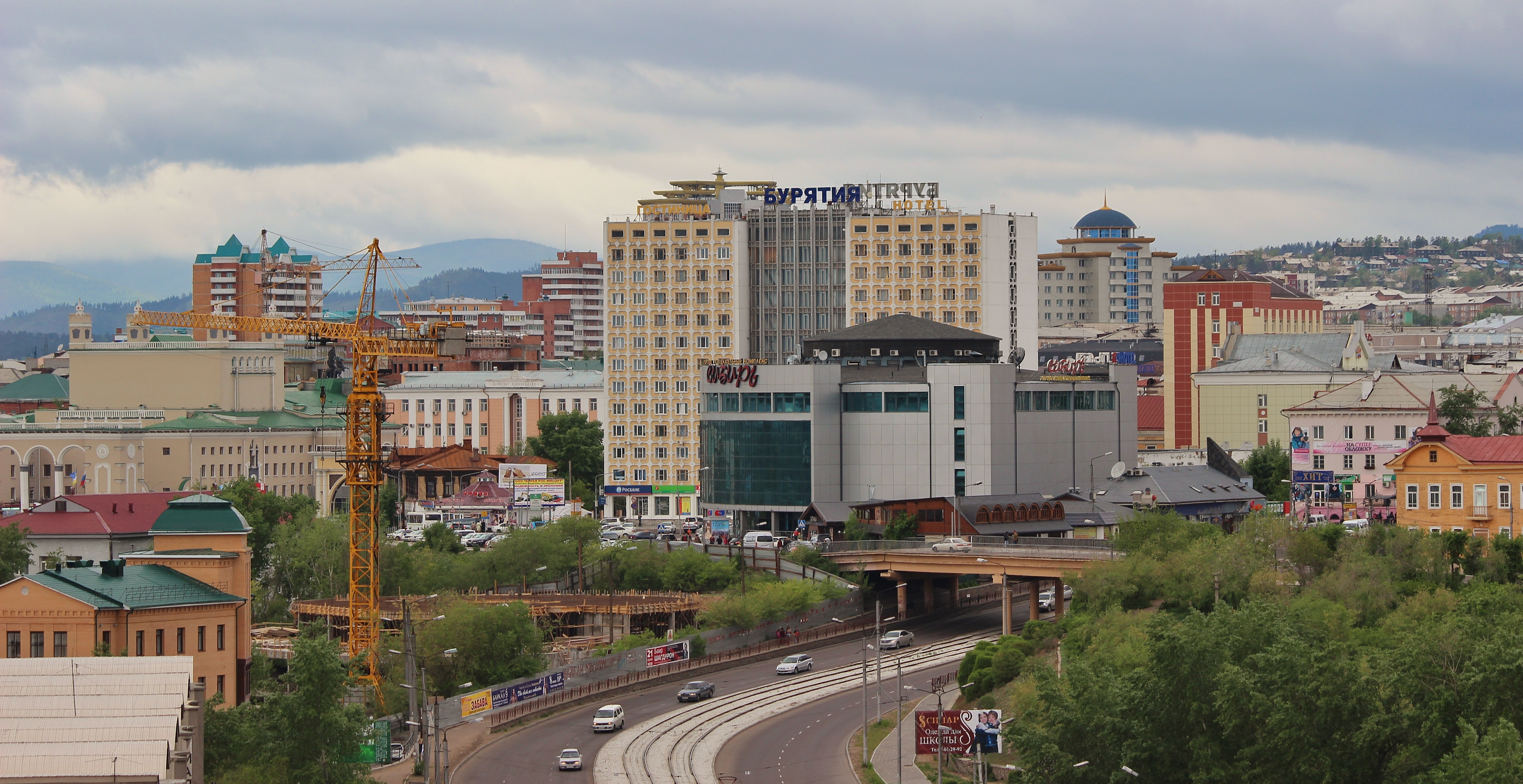
Ulan-Ude

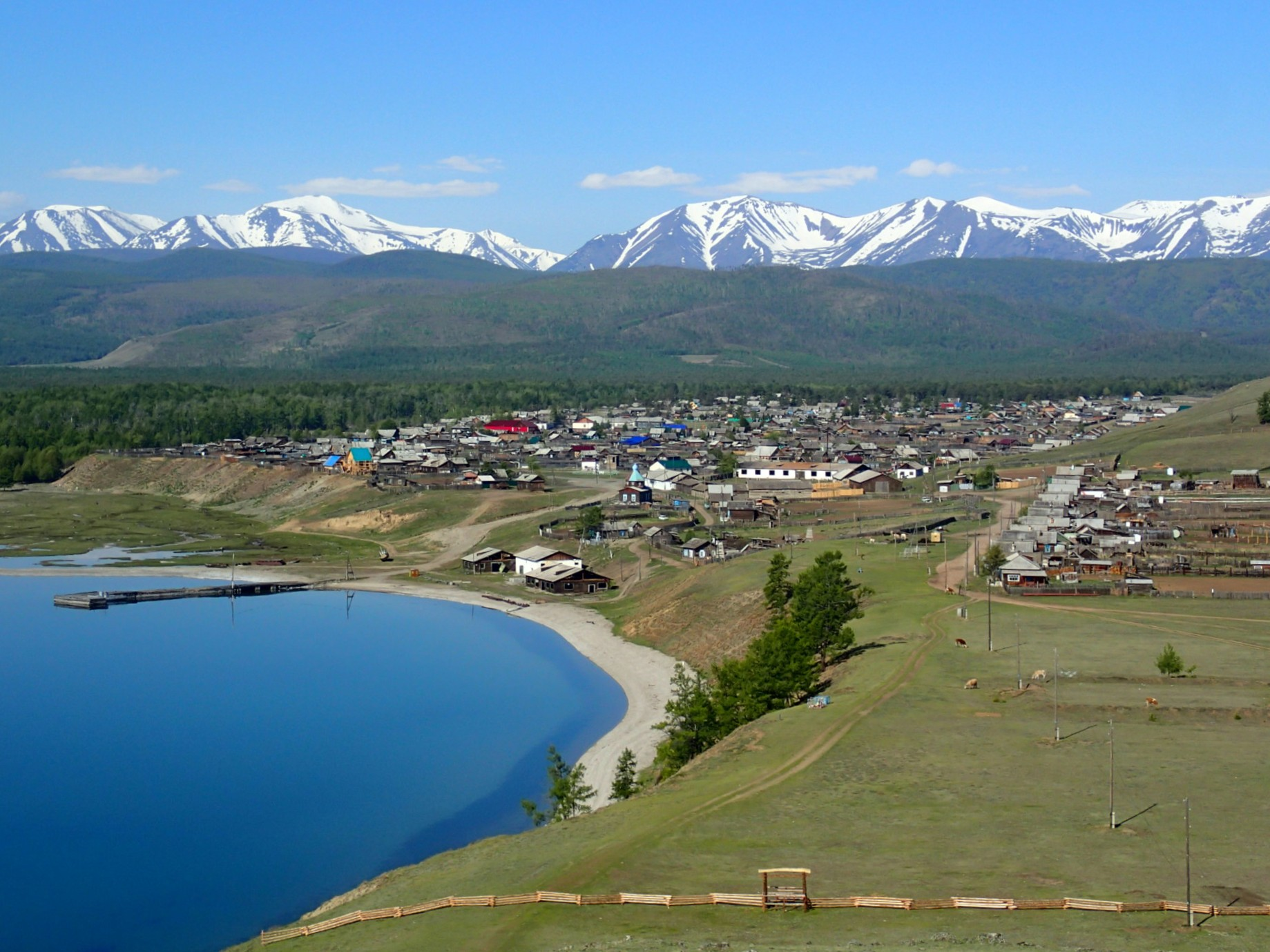
The village of Baikalskoe on the northern shores of Lake Baikal

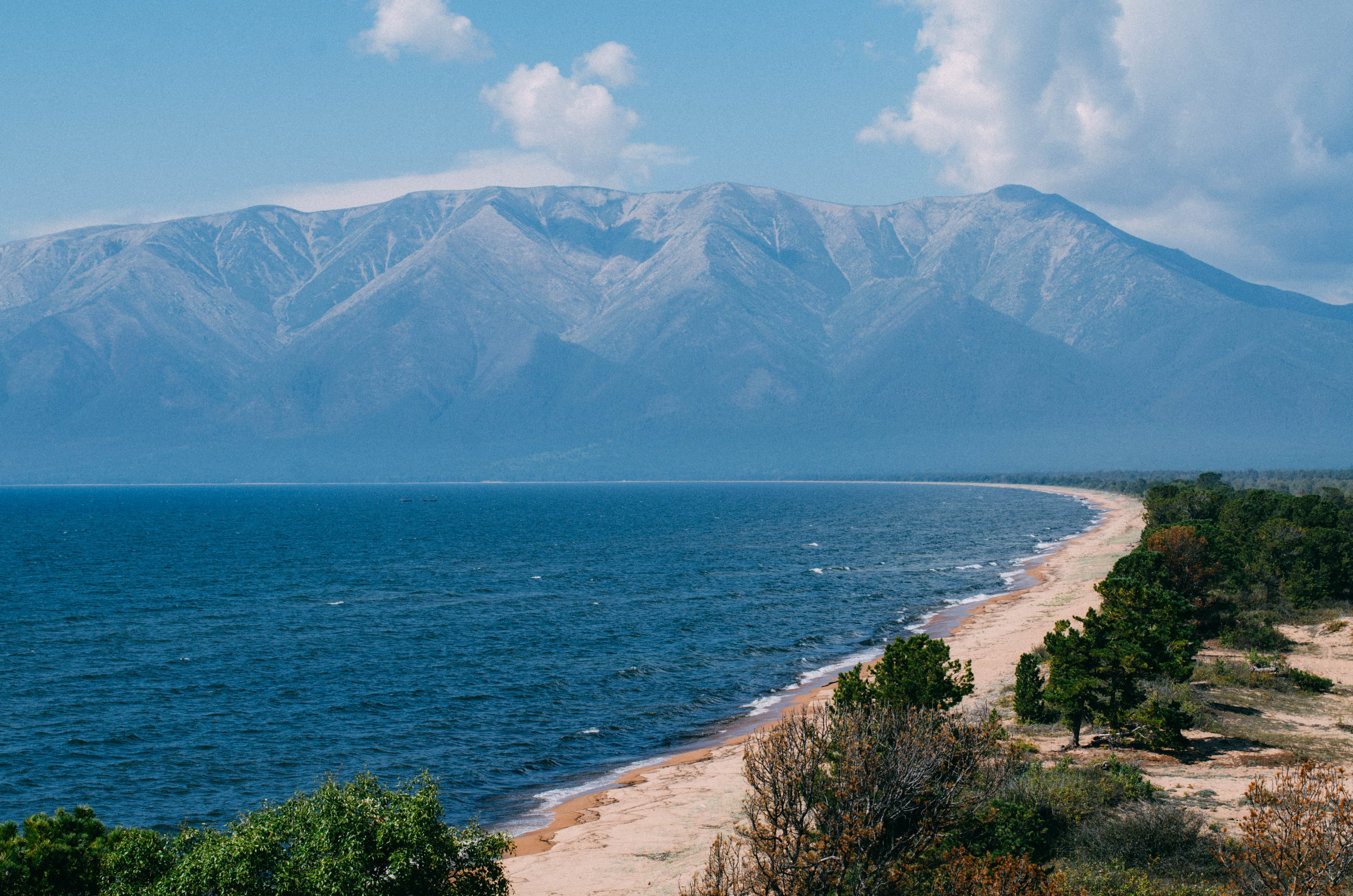
The peninsula of Svyatoy Nos, Lake Baikal.

==== Demographics for 2007 ====
District	Births	Deaths	Growth	Pop (2007)	BR	DR	NGR
The Republic of Buryatia	12,337	9,833	2,504	960,000	17.13	13.66	0.35%
Ulan-Ude	4,260	3,517	743	373,300	15.22	12.56	0.27%
Bichursky District	339	318	21	26,900	16.80	15.76	0.10%
Dzhidinsky District	512	309	203	30,800	22.16	13.38	0.88%
Yeravninsky District	244	191	53	18,600	17.49	13.69	0.38%
Zaigrayevsky District	714	630	84	48,700	19.55	17.25	0.23%
Zakamensky District	492	322	170	30,400	21.58	14.12	0.75%
Ivolginsky District	498	320	178	31,000	21.42	13.76	0.77%
Kabansky District	702	779	−77	64,400	14.53	16.13	−0.16%
Kizhinginsky District	303	192	111	18,700	21.60	13.69	0.79%
Kyakhtinsky District	629	393	236	40,500	20.71	12.94	0.78%
Mukhorshibirsky District	338	319	19	28,000	16.10	15.19	0.09%
Pribaykalsky District	423	357	66	28,900	19.52	16.47	0.30%
Selenginsky District	628	522	106	47,500	17.63	14.65	0.30%
Tarbagataysky District	205	216	−11	16,900	16.17	17.04	−0.09%
Tunkinsky District	304	249	55	23,000	17.62	14.43	0.32%
Khorinsky District	314	222	92	19,200	21.81	15.42	0.64%
Barguzinsky District	367	272	95	25,600	19.11	14.17	0.49%
Bauntovsky Evenkiysky District	126	92	34	10,500	16.00	11.68	0.43%
Kurumkansky District	232	129	103	15,600	19.83	11.03	0.88%
Muysky District	179	112	67	15,600	15.30	9.57	0.57%
Okinsky District	73	37	36	5,100	19.08	9.67	0.94%
Severo-Baykalsky District	196	161	35	15,200	17.19	14.12	0.31%
Severobaykalsk	259	174	85	25,600	13.49	9.06	0.44%

=== Ethnic groups ===
According to the 2021 Census, ethnic Russians make up 64% of the republic's population, while the ethnic Buryats comprise 32.5% of the population. Other groups include Soyots (0.5%) and a host of smaller groups, each accounting for less than 0.5% of the total population.

Ethnic group	1926 Census^{1}		1939 Census		1959 Census		1970 Census		1979 Census		1989 Census		2002 Census		2010 Census		2021 Census^{2}	
Ethnic group	Number	%	Number	%	Number	%	Number	%	Number	%	Number	%	Number	%	Number	%	Number	%
Buryats	214,957	43.8%	116,382	21.3%	135,798	20.2%	178,660	22.0%	206,860	23.0%	249,525	24.0%	272,910	27.8%	286,839	30.0%	295,273	32.5%
Soyots	161	0.0%	116,382	21.3%	135,798	20.2%	178,660	22.0%	206,860	23.0%	249,525	24.0%	2,739	0.3%	3,579	0.4%	4,316	0.5%
Russians	258,796	52.7%	393,057	72.0%	502,568	74.6%	596,960	73.5%	647,785	72.0%	726,165	69.9%	665,512	67.8%	630,783	66.1%	581,764	63.9%
Tatars	3,092	0.6%	3,840	0.7%	8,058	1.2%	9,991	1.2%	10,290	1.1%	10,496	1.0%	8,189	0.8%	6,813	0.7%	4,035	0.4%
Evenks	2,808	0.6%	1,818	0.3%	1,335	0.2%	1,685	0.2%	1,543	0.2%	1,679	0.2%	2,334	0.2%	2,974	0.3%	2,995	0.3%
Ukrainians	1,982	0.4%	13,392	2.5%	10,183	1.5%	10,769	1.3%	15,290	1.7%	22,868	2.2%	9,585	1.0%	5,654	0.6%	2,007	0.2%
Others	9,440	1.9%	17,277	3.2%	15,384	2.3%	14,186	1.7%	17,630	2.0%	27,519	2.7%	19,969	2.0%	18,360	1.9%	19,325	2.1%
^{1} In 1926, the Buryat-Mongolian ASSR included Aga-Buryatia, Ust-Orda Buryatia, and Olkhonsky District. These territories were transferred to Chita and Irkutsk Oblasts in 1937. Consequently, the results of the 1926 census cannot be compared to the results of the censuses of 1939 and later.^{2} 68,873 people were registered from administrative databases, and could not declare an ethnicity. It is estimated that the proportion of ethnicities in this group is the same as that of the declared group.

=== Religion ===
Religion in Buryatia as of 2012 (Sreda Arena Atlas)
Russian Orthodoxy	27.4%
Other Orthodox	1.2%
Protestantism	0.6%
Other Christians	4.2%
Buddhism	19.8%
Tengrism and Yellow shamanism or Black shamanism	1.8%
Spiritual but not religious	24.8%
Atheism and irreligion	13.4%
Other and undeclared	6.8%

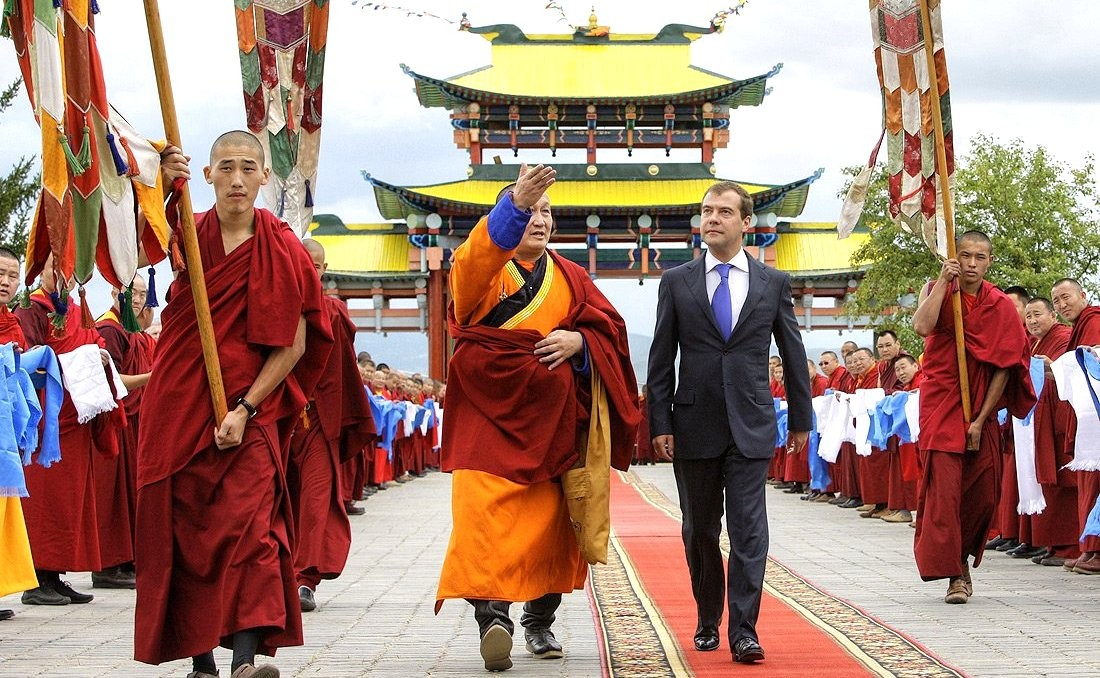
Dmitry Medvedev at a Buddhist temple in Buryatia

Traditionally, Buryats adhered to belief systems that were based on the deification of nature, belief in spirits, and the possibility of their magic influence on the surroundings. They were led by shamans, who systematized tribal beliefs and cults. From the second half of the 17th century, beliefs and cults in the shamanic form were displaced by Tibetan Buddhism, which became widespread in ethnic Buryatia. By the end of the 19th century, the majority of Buryats were part of the Tibetan Buddhist tradition. A synthesis of Tibetan Buddhism and traditional beliefs that formed a system of ecological traditions has constituted a major attribute of Buryat culture. In 2003, the Local Religious Organization of Shamans, Tengeri was officially registered as a religious organization in Buryatia.

As of a 2012 survey 27.4% of the population adheres to the Russian Orthodox Church, 19.8% to Tibetan Buddhism, 2% to the Slavic Native Faith, Tengrism or Buryat shamanism, 4% declares to be unaffiliated Christian (excluding Protestants), 1% are Orthodox Christian believers without belonging to churches or are members of other Orthodox churches, 1% are members of Protestant churches. In addition, 25% of the population declares to be "spiritual but not religious", 13% to be atheist, and 10.8% follows another religion or did not give an answer to the survey.

Tibetan Buddhism and Orthodox Christianity are the most widespread religions in the republic. Many Slavs, who constitute around 67% of the population, are Russian Orthodox. Since the breakup of the USSR in 1991, a small number have converted to various Protestant denominations or to Rodnovery, also known as the Slavic native faith. There are also some Catholics among the Slavs. Most of the Germans (0.11% of the population) are also Orthodox, so are some other non-European groups like Armenians (0.23%), Georgians (0.03%), and Soyot (0.37%). Buryats constitute 30.04% of the total population.

Most urban Buryats are either Buddhist or Orthodox, while those in the rural areas often adhere to Yellow shamanism, a mixture of shamanism and Buddhism, or to Black shamanism. There are also Tengrist movements. Siberian Tatars are around 0.7% of the population. However, due to isolation from the main body of Tatars, many of them now are either non-religious or Orthodox. Islam is followed by immigrant groups like Azeris and Uzbeks, who constitute another 0.7% of the population.

=== Education ===
The higher education institutions of the republic include Buryat State University, Buryat State Academy of Agriculture, East Siberian State Academy of Arts and Culture, and East Siberia State University of Technology and Management.

== Economy ==
The republic's economy is composed of agricultural and commercial products including wheat, vegetables, potatoes, timber, leather, graphite, and textiles. Fishing, hunting, fur farming, sheep and cattle farming, mining, stock raising, engineering, and food processing are also important economic generators. The unemployment rate of Buryatia was 11% in 2020.

GDP per person nominal in 2018 was 3,650 USD and PPP in 2009 was 11,148 USD.

== Tourism ==
Lake Baikal is a popular tourist destination, especially in summer.

== See also ==
- Music of Buryatia
- Ust-Orda Buryat Autonomous Okrug

== Sources ==
- Верховный Совет Республики Бурятия. 22 февраля 1994 г. «Республика Бурятия. Конституция», в ред. Закона №332-IV от 7 июля 2008 г. (Supreme Council of the Republic of Buryatia. 22 February 1994 Republic of Buryatia. Constitution, as amended by the Law #332-IV of 7 July 2008. ).
