= Mongolia–Russia border =

International border

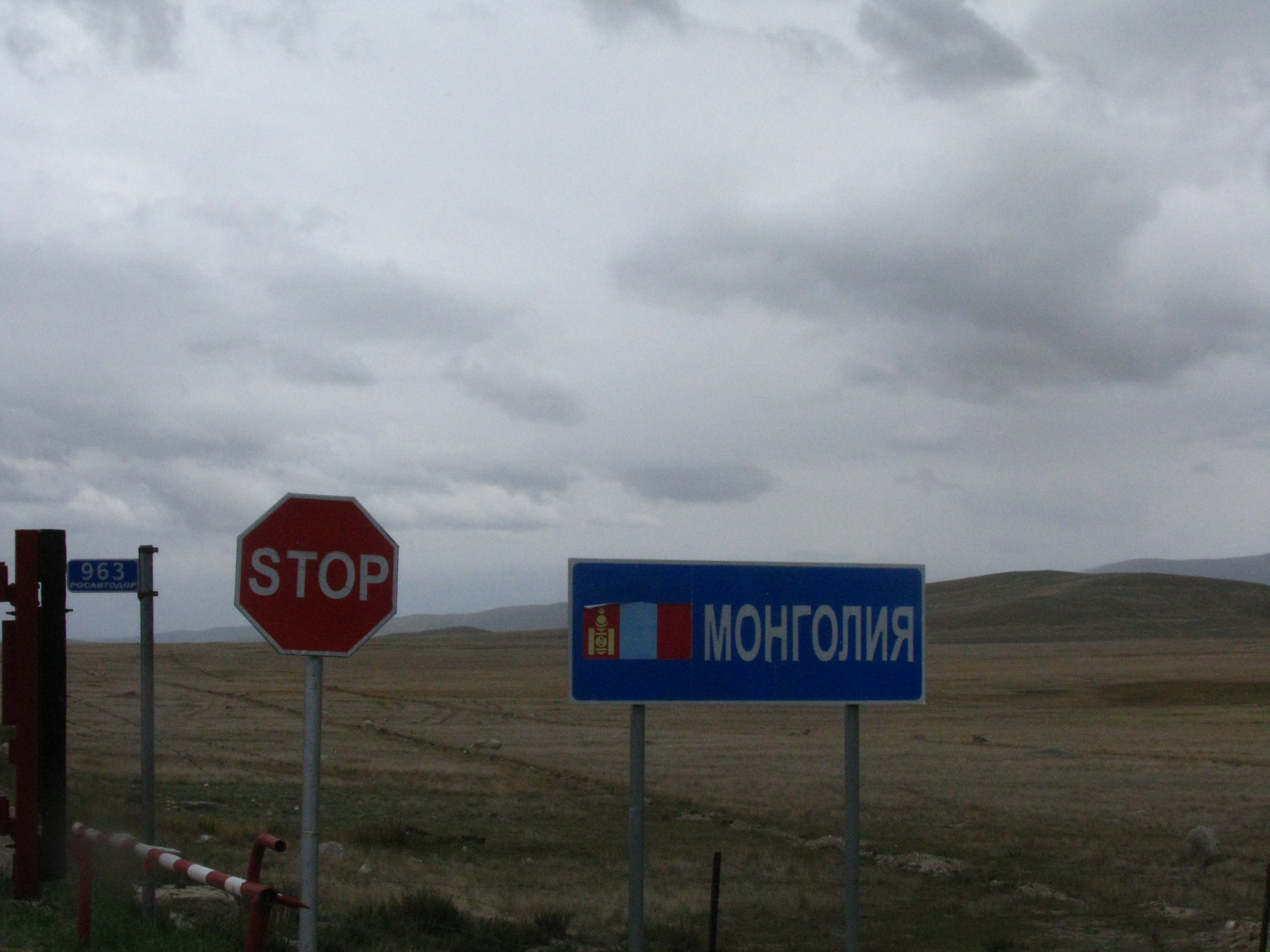
- Border sign into Mongolia at the Russian side of the border

Characteristics
- Entities: Russia Mongolia
- Length: 3485 km

History
- Established: 1727; Treaty of Kyakhta (1727)
- Current shape: 1924; Mongolian People's Republic
- Treaties: Treaty of Saint Petersburg (1881), Treaty of Kyakhta (1915)

Mongolian and Russian boundary markers

The Mongolia–Russia border (Note: Mongolian: Монгол-Оросын хил, romanized: Mongol-Orosiin khil, [ˈmɔɴɢɞ̆ɮ‿ˌɔɾɞ̆ˈsiːɴ çiɬ]; Russian: Российско-монгольская граница, romanized: Rossijsko-mongoljskaja granica, IPA: [rɐˌsʲijskə‿mɐnˈɡolʲskəjə ɡrɐˈnʲitsə]) is the international border between Mongolia and the Russian Federation. It runs from west to east between the two tripoints with China for 3,485 km (2,165 mi). The boundary is the third longest border between Russia and another country, behind the Kazakhstan–Russia border and the China–Russia border.

== Description ==
The border begins in the west at the western tripoint with China, located just 100 kilometres (62 mi) east of the China–Kazakhstan–Russia tripoint. It then proceeds overland in a broadly north-east direction through the Altai Mountains, up to the vicinity of Mongolia's Uvs Lake, briefly cutting into the lake so as to leave the far north-eastern corner in Russia. The border then proceeds eastwards via a series of overland lines, angled slightly to the south-east; this section also cuts across Lake Tore-Khol. The border then turns north across the Ulaan Taiga mountains, forming a broad arc through the Sayan Mountains around Mongolia's Lake Khövsgöl. The border continues overland eastwards, arching broadly north (a short part of which utilises the river Chikoy) and then south in two long arcs, before turning north-east and then east, skirting south of Russia's Lake Barun-Torey, to terminate at the eastern Chinese tripoint.

=== Tripoints ===
The eastern and western end points of the Mongolia–Russia border are tripoints, i.e. junctions with the China–Russia border and the China–Mongolia border. A special trilateral agreement, signed on January 27, 1994, in Ulaanbaatar, determines the location of these two tripoints. The agreement is based on earlier bilateral treaties between the parties involved.

The trilateral agreement specifies that a border monument was to be erected at the eastern tripoint, called Tarbagan-Dakh (Ta'erbagan Dahu, Tarvagan Dakh); a later trilateral protocol determined the tripoint's geographic coordinates as 49°50′42.3″N 116°42′46.8″E. The border monument and the access roads for it are visible on Google Maps, at approximately 49.845625°N 116.714026°E.

The trilateral agreement states that no marker will be erected at the western tripoint, which was defined as the peak of the mountain Tavan-Bogdo-Ula (Kuitunshan 奎屯山, Tavan Bogd Uul; elevation approx. 4,081–4,104 m [13,389–13,465 ft], location, 49°10′13.5″N 87°48′56.3″E), due to its remote and hard to access location, on a mountain covered with perpetual snows.

== History ==
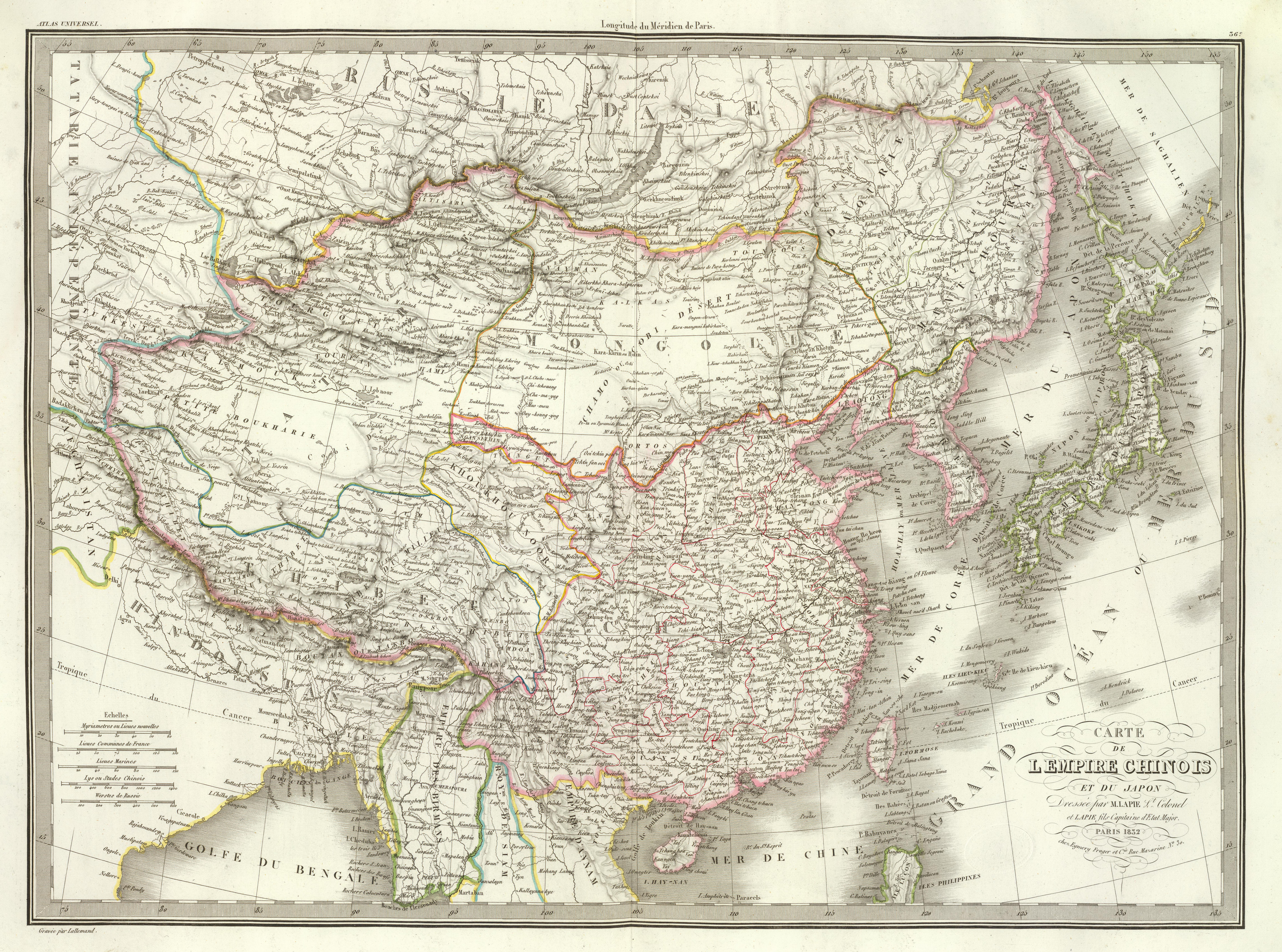
The Sino-Russian border within the regions of Mongolia, as it ran throughout the 19th century, largely corresponded to today's Mongolia–Russia border; the main difference is the absorption of Tuva into Russia

Russia had expanded far into Siberia during the course of the 17th century, bringing it into conflict with Qing China, which at that time ruled Mongolia (called 'Outer' Mongolia, to differentiate it from Inner Mongolia which was under more effective Chinese control). Much of the line of today's Mongolia–Russia border was set by the Treaty of Kyakhta between Russia and China; however, the treaty left Tuva on the Chinese side of the border. The line was confirmed via the Treaty of Saint Petersburg in 1881.

With China engulfed in chaos following the collapse of the Qing dynasty in 1911, Mongolian nationalists seized the opportunity to declare Outer Mongolia independent, with the support of Russia. Russia also took advantage of China's weakness to annex Tuva, thereby creating the modern Mongolia–Russia border. In 1915 the Second Treaty of Kyakhta was signed, by which Russia acknowledged formal Chinese suzerainty over Mongolia, albeit with Russia maintaining significant influence, leaving the country in effect as a semi-autonomous condominium. Following the Russian Revolution in 1917, China invaded Mongolia in an attempt to re-assert full control; however, they were ultimately repulsed by Mongol and Soviet Russian forces, with Mongolia declaring independence in 1921, which was not recognised by China until 1946. Although an independent Tuvan People's Republic was declared in 1921, this small country became fully annexed into the Soviet Union in 1944, whereupon the former Mongolia–Tuva border became a section of the Mongolia–Soviet border. The latter remained stable for the rest of the Soviet Union's existence, and continued as the Mongolia–Russia border after the dissolution of the Soviet Union in 1991.

== Border crossings ==
At the border there are 11 official crossing points. Two of them are railway crossings, but only one (Naushki) has passenger traffic. Four highway border crossing points are designated as "multilateral", for any passport holders (Tashanta-TcagaanNur, Kyakhta-Aganbulag, Solovjovsk - Erentsav). Another five highway border crossing points are designated as "bilateral", meaning that they are only open to the citizens of the two bordering countries, and not to third-country nationals. The following border crossings exist (listed from West to East):

(Mongolia) Mongolian name	Province	(Russia) Russian name	Fed. subject	Route in Mongolia	Route in Russia	Status
Tsagaannuur	Bayan-Ölgii	Tashanta	Altai Republic	AH-4		international
Borshoo	Uvs	Khandagayty	Tuva			international
Tes	Uvs	Shara-Sur	Tuva	local road	local road	bilateral
Arts suuri	Zavkhan	Tsagan-Tolgoy	Tuva			bilaterial
Khankh	Khövsgöl	Mondy	Buryatia			bilateral
Sükhbaatar	Selenge	Naushki	Buryatia	railway	railway	international
Altanbulag	Selenge	Kyakhta	Buryatia	AH-3		international
Ulikhan	Dornod	Verkhny Ulkhun	Zabaykalsky Krai	local road		bilateral
Ereentsav	Dornod	Solovyevsk	Zabaykalsky Krai	AH-4		bilateral
Ereentsav	Dornod	Solovyevsk	Zabaykalsky Krai	railway	railway	bilateral, freight only

== Border violations ==
According to an article published in 2005, the main problems at the Russian-Mongolian border, specifically in its Republic of Tuva section, were cross-border livestock theft (in both directions) and smuggling of meat.

== Administrative divisions ==
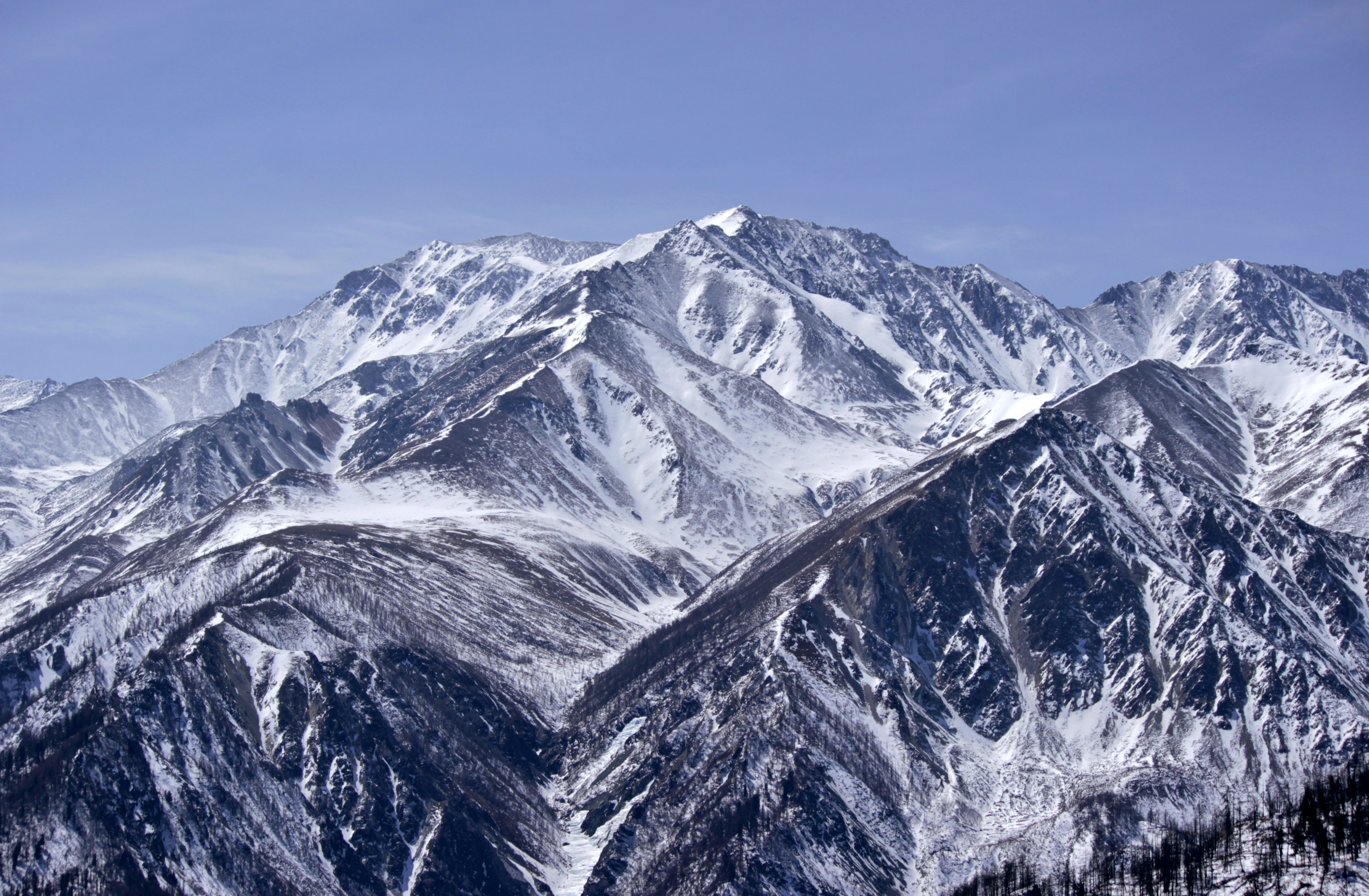
The peak of Mt Munku Sardyk is located on the Mongolia–Russia border

=== Federal subjects of Russia bordered by Mongolia ===
Four federal subjects of Russia border Mongolia:

- Altai Republic
- Tuva Republic
- Republic of Buryatia
- Zabaykalsky Krai

=== Provinces of Mongolia bordered by Russia ===
Eight provinces of Mongolia border Russia:

- Bayan-Ölgii
- Uvs
- Zavkhan
- Khövsgöl
- Bulgan
- Selenge
- Khentii
- Dornod

== Settlements near the border ==
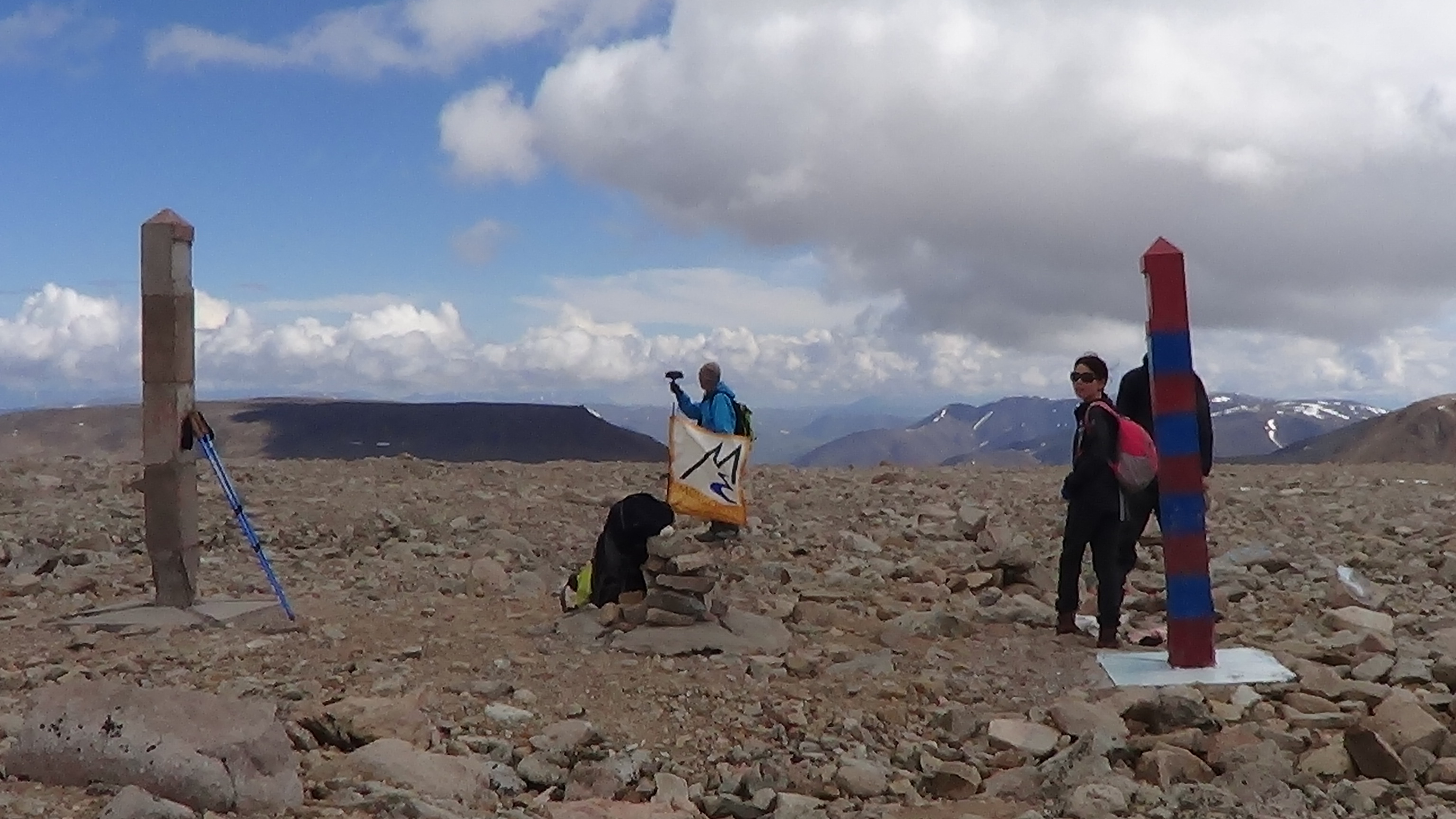
Tourists at the border

=== Mongolia ===
- Qara modun
- Züünxövöö
- Tooromt
- Altay
- Burğaasa
- Zelter
- Sükhbaatar
- Altanbulag
- Çuluunkhoroot/Ereencav

=== Russia ===
- Qızıl-Xaya
- Sagly
- Xandağaytı
- Dus-Dag
- Ça-Sur
- Aq-Erik
- Xol-Ooju
- Erzin
- Tarıs-Arjan
- Ush Bel-dyr
- Mondy
- Moğoytı
- Turan
- Kyren
- Sanaga
- Yengorboy
- Şara-Azarğa
- Dutulur
- Zakamensk
- Xoltısın
- Khamney
- Yeke-Cäkir
- Mikhaylovka
- Ulekchin
- Naryn
- Nizhny Torey
- Oyor
- Nizhny Burgaltay
- Petropavlovka
- Botsy
- Naushki
- Kyakhta
- Chikoy
- Kiran
- Bolshaya Kudara
- Şarağol
- Ust-Dunguy
- Ust-Dunguy
- Menzo
- Baldzhikan
- Ust Bukukun
- Altın
- Gavan
- Tyrin
- Verkhniy Ulkhun
- Mikhaylo-Pavlovsk
- Öpör-Toqtor
- Buylesan
- Solovyevsk

== See also ==
- China–Mongolia border
- Mongolia–Russia relations
