= Bayangol =

Bayangol (Баянгол [páiˑɴɢɜɬ]; lit. 'Rich River') may refer to:

== Mongolia ==
- Bayangol, Ulaanbaatar, a düüreg (city district) in the capital of Mongolia
- several Sums (districts) in different Aimags (provinces) in Mongolia
  - Bayangol, Övörkhangai
  - Bayangol, Selenge

== China ==
- Bayingolin Mongol Autonomous Prefecture
  - Bayingolin, Hejing
- several Towns in different Banners (counties), Inner Mongolia
  - Bayangol, Dengkou
  - Bayangol, Jalaid
- Bayingol, Alxa, a sum (township) in the Alxa Right Banner, Inner Mongolia
- Bayingol Gaqaa, Uxin, a village in the Uxin Banner, Inner Mongolia
- Bayingolin River, a river in Hejing County, Xinjiang
- Bayin River, Delingha, a river in Delingha City, Qinghai

== Russia ==
- several ulus in different districts, Republic of Buryatia
  - Bayangol, Khorinsky
  - Bayangol, Zakamensky
  - Bayangol, Barguzinsky
