= Verkhny Yonkhor =

Verkhny Yonkhor Верхний Ёнхор
- Selo
- Location within Republic of Buryatia Location within Russia
- Coordinates: 50°28′N 105°43′E
- Country: Russia
- Region: Republic of Buryatia
- District: Dzhidinsky District
- Time zone: UTC+8:00

Verkhny Yonkhor (Russian: Верхний Ёнхор; Buryat: Дээдэ Ёнхор, Deede Yonkhor) is a rural locality (a selo) in Dzhidinsky District, Republic of Buryatia, Russia. The population was 86 as of 2010.

== Geography ==
Verkhny Yonkhor is located 54 km southeast of Petropavlovka (the district's administrative centre) by road. Botsy is the nearest rural locality.
