= Borgoy, Republic of Buryatia =

Borgoy Боргой
- Selo
- Location within Republic of Buryatia Location within Russia
- Coordinates: 50°44′N 105°50′E
- Country: Russia
- Region: Republic of Buryatia
- District: Dzhidinsky District
- Time zone: UTC+8:00

Borgoy (Russian: Боргой; Buryat: Борьёо) is a rural locality (a selo) in Dzhidinsky District, Republic of Buryatia, Russia. The population was 527 as of 2017. There are 10 streets.

== Geography ==
Borgoy is located 43 km northwest of Petropavlovka (the district's administrative centre) by road. Inzagatuy is the nearest rural locality.
