= Tengerek =

Tengerek Тэнгэрэк
- Selo
- Location within Republic of Buryatia Location within Russia
- Coordinates: 50°29′N 105°07′E
- Country: Russia
- Region: Republic of Buryatia
- District: Dzhidinsky District
- Time zone: UTC+8:00

Tengerek (Russian: Тэнгэрэк; Buryat: Тэнгэрэг, Tengereg) is a rural locality (a selo) in Dzhidinsky District, Republic of Buryatia, Russia. The population was 124 as of 2010. There is 1 street.

== Geography ==
Tengerek is located 32 km southwest of Petropavlovka (the district's administrative centre) by road. Zheltura is the nearest rural locality.
