= Beloozyorsk, Republic of Buryatia =

Beloozyorsk Белоозёрск
- Selo
- Location within Republic of Buryatia Location within Russia
- Coordinates: 50°38′N 105°42′E
- Country: Russia
- Region: Republic of Buryatia
- District: Dzhidinsky District
- Time zone: UTC+8:00

Beloozyorsk (Russian: Белоозёрск) is a rural locality (a selo) in Dzhidinsky District, Republic of Buryatia, Russia. The population was 1,011 as of 2010. There are 34 streets.

== Geography ==
Beloozyorsk is located 30 km east of Petropavlovka (the district's administrative centre) by road. Nyuguy is the nearest rural locality.
