= Bulyk =

Bulyk Булык
- Selo
- Location within Republic of Buryatia Location within Russia
- Coordinates: 50°35′N 105°15′E
- Country: Russia
- Region: Republic of Buryatia
- District: Dzhidinsky District
- Time zone: UTC+8:00

Bulyk (Russian: Булык; Buryat: Булаг, Bulag) is a rural locality (a selo) in Dzhidinsky District, Republic of Buryatia, Russia. The population was 620 as of 2010. There are 6 streets.

== Geography ==
Bulyk is located 6 km southwest of Petropavlovka (the district's administrative centre) by road. Petropavlovka is the nearest rural locality.
