= Verkhny Torey =

Verkhny Torey Верхний Торей
- Selo
- Location within Republic of Buryatia Location within Russia
- Coordinates: 50°39′N 104°48′E
- Country: Russia
- Region: Republic of Buryatia
- District: Dzhidinsky District
- Time zone: UTC+8:00

Verkhny Torey (Russian: Верхний Торей; Buryat: Дээдэ Тори, Deede Tori) is a rural locality (a selo) in Dzhidinsky District, Republic of Buryatia, Russia. The population was 581 as of 2010. There are 40 streets.

== Geography ==
Verkhny Torey is located 49 km northwest of Petropavlovka (the district's administrative centre) by road. Ulzar is the nearest rural locality.
