= Nyuguy =

Nyuguy Нюгуй
- Selo
- Location within Republic of Buryatia Location within Russia
- Coordinates: 50°31′N 105°45′E
- Country: Russia
- Region: Republic of Buryatia
- District: Dzhidinsky District
- Time zone: UTC+8:00

Nyuguy (Russian: Нюгуй) is a rural locality (a selo) in Dzhidinsky District, Republic of Buryatia, Russia. The population was 311 as of 2010. There are 8 streets.

== Geography ==
Nyuguy is located 46 km southeast of Petropavlovka (the district's administrative centre) by road. Yonkhor is the nearest rural locality.
