= Shara-Azarga =

Shara-Azarga Шара-Азарга
- Ulus
- Location within Republic of Buryatia Location within Russia
- Coordinates: 50°28′N 103°03′E
- Country: Russia
- Region: Republic of Buryatia
- District: Zakamensky District
- Time zone: UTC+8:00

Shara-Azarga (Russian: Шара-Азарга) is a rural locality (an ulus) in Zakamensky District, Republic of Buryatia, Russia. The population was 628 as of 2010. There are 7 streets.

== Geography ==
Shara-Azarga is located 38 km northwest of Zakamensk (the district's administrative centre) by road. Yengorboy is the nearest rural locality.
