= Nurta =

Nurta Нурта
- Selo
- Location within Republic of Buryatia Location within Russia
- Coordinates: 50°23′N 103°07′E
- Country: Russia
- Region: Republic of Buryatia
- District: Zakamensky District
- Time zone: UTC+8:00

Nurta (Russian: Нурта) is a rural locality (a selo) in Zakamensky District, Republic of Buryatia, Russia. The population was 300 as of 2010. There are 8 streets.

== Geography ==
Nurta is located 19 km west of Zakamensk (the district's administrative centre) by road. Zakamensk is the nearest rural locality.
