= Khurtaga =

Khurtaga Хуртага
- Selo
- Location within Republic of Buryatia Location within Russia
- Coordinates: 50°26′N 103°56′E
- Country: Russia
- Region: Republic of Buryatia
- District: Zakamensky District
- Time zone: UTC+8:00

Khurtaga (Russian: Хуртага) is a rural locality (a selo) in Zakamensky District, Republic of Buryatia, Russia. The population was 705 as of 2024. There are 4 streets.

== Geography ==
Khurtaga is located 62 km east of Zakamensk (the district's administrative centre) by road. Khamney is the nearest rural locality.
