= Inzagatuy =

Inzagatuy Инзагатуй
- Selo
- Location within Republic of Buryatia Location within Russia
- Coordinates: 50°49′N 105°44′E
- Country: Russia
- Region: Republic of Buryatia
- District: Dzhidinsky District
- Time zone: UTC+8:00

Inzagatuy (Russian: Инзагатуй; Buryat: Инзагата, Inzagata) is a rural locality (a selo) in Dzhidinsky District, Republic of Buryatia, Russia. The population was 498 as of 2017. There are 11 streets.

== Geography ==
Inzagatuy is located 54 km northeast of Petropavlovka (the district's administrative centre) by road. Borgoy is the nearest rural locality.
