= Yenkhor =

Yenkhor Енхор
- Selo
- Location within Republic of Buryatia Location within Russia
- Coordinates: 50°31′N 105°49′E
- Country: Russia
- Region: Republic of Buryatia
- District: Dzhidinsky District
- Time zone: UTC+8:00

Yenkhor (Russian: Енхор; Buryat: Ёнхор, Yonhor) is a rural locality (a selo) and the administrative centre of Yonkhorskoye Rural Settlement, Dzhidinsky District, Republic of Buryatia, Russia. The population was 797 as of 2013. There are 11 streets.

== Geography ==
Yenkhor is located 56 km southeast of Petropavlovka (the district's administrative centre) by road. Nyuguy is the nearest rural locality.
