= Tsagan-Morin =

Tsagan-Morin Цаган-Морин
- Selo
- Location within Republic of Buryatia Location within Russia
- Coordinates: 50°44′N 103°12′E
- Country: Russia
- Region: Republic of Buryatia
- District: Zakamensky District
- Time zone: UTC+8:00

Tsagan-Morin (Russian: Цаган-Морин; Buryat: Сагаан Морин, Sagaan Morin) is a rural locality (a selo) in Zakamensky District, Republic of Buryatia, Russia. The population was 524 as of 2010. There are 7 streets.

== Geography ==
Tsagan-Morin is located 72 km north of Zakamensk (the district's administrative centre) by road. Bortoy is the nearest rural locality.
