= Ulentuy =

Ulentuy Улентуй
- Ulus
- Location within Republic of Buryatia Location within Russia
- Coordinates: 50°29′N 103°25′E
- Country: Russia
- Region: Republic of Buryatia
- District: Zakamensky District
- Time zone: UTC+8:00

Ulentuy (Russian: Улентуй; Buryat: Υлэнтэ, Ülente) is a rural locality (an ulus) in Zakamensky District, Republic of Buryatia, Russia. The population was 307 as of 2024. There are 5 streets.

== Geography ==
Ulentuy is located 22 km north of Zakamensk (the district's administrative centre) by road. Dutulur is the nearest rural locality.
