= Altsak =

Altsak Алцак
- Selo
- Location within Republic of Buryatia Location within Russia
- Coordinates: 50°40′N 104°36′E
- Country: Russia
- Region: Republic of Buryatia
- District: Dzhidinsky District
- Time zone: UTC+8:00

Altsak (Russian: Алцак) is a rural locality (a selo) and the administrative centre of Altsakskoye Rural Settlement, Dzhidinsky District, Republic of Buryatia, Russia. The population was 363 as of 2017. There are 4 streets.

== Geography ==
Altsak is located 73 km northwest of Petropavlovka (the district's administrative centre) by road. Armak is the nearest rural locality.
