= Tokhoy =

Tokhoy Тохой
- Selo
- Location within Republic of Buryatia Location within Russia
- Coordinates: 50°29′N 105°00′E
- Country: Russia
- Region: Republic of Buryatia
- District: Dzhidinsky District
- Time zone: UTC+8:00

Tokhoy (Russian: Тохой) is a rural locality (a selo) in Dzhidinsky District, Republic of Buryatia, Russia. The population was 261 as of 2010. There are 3 streets.

== Geography ==
Tokhoy is located 32 km southwest of Petropavlovka (the district's administrative centre) by road. Stary Ukyrchelon is the nearest rural locality.
