= Usanovka =

Usanovka Усановка
- Settlement
- Location within Republic of Buryatia Location within Russia
- Coordinates: 50°23′N 103°54′E
- Country: Russia
- Region: Republic of Buryatia
- District: Zakamensky District
- Time zone: UTC+8:00

Usanovka (Russian: Усановка) is a rural locality (a settlement) in Zakamensky District, Republic of Buryatia, Russia. The population was 53 as of 2010.

== Geography ==
Usanovka is located 56 km east of Zakamensk (the district's administrative centre) by road. Khamney is the nearest rural locality.
