= Maly Naryn =

Maly Naryn Малый Нарын
- Ulus
- Location within Republic of Buryatia Location within Russia
- Coordinates: 50°39′N 105°08′E
- Country: Russia
- Region: Republic of Buryatia
- District: Dzhidinsky District
- Time zone: UTC+8:00

Maly Naryn (Russian: Малый Нарын; Buryat: Бага Нарин, Baga Narin) is a rural locality (an ulus) in Dzhidinsky District, Republic of Buryatia, Russia. The population was 238 as of 2010. There are 3 streets.

== Geography ==
Maly Naryn is located 16 km southeast of Petropavlovka (the district's administrative centre) by road. Gegetuy is the nearest rural locality.
