= Armak, Republic of Buryatia =

Armak Армак
- Selo
- Location within Republic of Buryatia Location within Russia
- Coordinates: 50°36′N 104°35′E
- Country: Russia
- Region: Republic of Buryatia
- District: Dzhidinsky District
- Time zone: UTC+8:00

Armak (Russian: Армак) is a rural locality (a selo) and the administrative centre of Armakskoye Rural Settlement, Dzhidinsky District, Republic of Buryatia, Russia. The population was 468 as of 2017. There are 4 streets.

== Geography ==
Armak is located 67 km west of Petropavlovka (the district's administrative centre) by road. Altsak is the nearest rural locality.
