= Khatsura =

Khatsura Хасура
- Settlement
- Location within Republic of Buryatia Location within Russia
- Coordinates: 50°19′N 103°16′E
- Country: Russia
- Region: Republic of Buryatia
- District: Zakamensky District
- Time zone: UTC+8:00

Khatsura (Russian: Хасура; Buryat: Хасуури, Khasuuri) is a rural locality (a settlement) in Zakamensky District, Republic of Buryatia, Russia. The population was 80 as of 2010. There are 2 streets.

== Geography ==
Khatsura is located 6 km south of Zakamensk (the district's administrative centre) by road. Zakamensk is the nearest rural locality.
