= Shartykey =

Shartykey Шартыкей
- Selo
- Location within Republic of Buryatia Location within Russia
- Coordinates: 50°30′N 104°48′E
- Country: Russia
- Region: Republic of Buryatia
- District: Dzhidinsky District
- Time zone: UTC+8:00

Shartykey (Russian: Шартыкей) is a rural locality (a selo) in Dzhidinsky District, Republic of Buryatia, Russia. The population was 234 as of 2010.

== Geography ==
Shartykey is located 40 km southwest of Petropavlovka (the district's administrative centre) by road. Nizhny Torey is the nearest rural locality.
