= Podkhuldochi =

Podkhuldochi Подхулдочи
- Selo
- Location within Republic of Buryatia Location within Russia
- Coordinates: 50°35′N 104°43′E
- Country: Russia
- Region: Republic of Buryatia
- District: Dzhidinsky District
- Time zone: UTC+8:00

Podkhuldochi (Russian: Подхулдочи; Buryat: Хадхалдочи, Khadkhaldochi) is a rural locality (a selo) in Dzhidinsky District, Republic of Buryatia, Russia. The population was 9 as of 2010.

== Geography ==
Podkhuldochi is located 62 km west of Petropavlovka (the district's administrative centre) by road. Armak is the nearest rural locality.
