= Zakamensk (disambiguation) =

Zakamensk is a town in the Republic of Buryatia, Russia.

Zakamensk may also refer to:

- Zakamensk Urban Settlement, a municipal formation into which the Town of Zakamensk and Kholtosonsky Selsoviet in Zakamensky District of the Republic of Buryatia, Russia are incorporated
- Zakamensk Airport, an airport in Russia served by Bural airline

== See also ==
- Zakamensky District
