= Kharatsay =

Kharatsay Харацай
- Selo
- Location within Republic of Buryatia Location within Russia
- Coordinates: 50°28′N 104°28′E
- Country: Russia
- Region: Republic of Buryatia
- District: Zakamensky District
- Time zone: UTC+8:00

Kharatsay (Russian: Харацай; Buryat: Харасаа, Kharasaa) is a rural locality (a selo) in Zakamensky District, Republic of Buryatia, Russia. The population was 390 as of 2010. There are 9 streets.

== Geography ==
Kharatsay is located 101 km east of Zakamensk (the district's administrative centre) by road. Naryn is the nearest rural locality.
