= Burguy =

Burguy Бургуй
- Selo
- Location within Republic of Buryatia Location within Russia
- Coordinates: 50°26′N 103°46′E
- Country: Russia
- Region: Republic of Buryatia
- District: Zakamensky District
- Time zone: UTC+8:00

Burguy (Russian: Бургуй; Buryat: Бγргэ, Bürge) is a rural locality (a selo) in Zakamensky District, Republic of Buryatia, Russia. The population was 567 as of 2010. There are 8 streets.

== Geography ==
Burguy is located 44 km east of Zakamensk (the district's administrative centre) by road. Khamney is the nearest rural locality.
