= Dzhida =

Dzhida may refer to:

- Dzhida, Kyrgyzstan, a village in Osh Province, Kyrgyzstan
- Dzhida, Russia, several rural localities in Russia
- Dzhida (air base), an air base in Russia
- Dzhida River, a river in the Republic of Buryatia, Russia, on which the town of Zakamensk stands
