= Khamney =

Khamney Хамней
- Selo
- Location within Republic of Buryatia Location within Russia
- Coordinates: 50°24′N 103°52′E
- Country: Russia
- Region: Republic of Buryatia
- District: Zakamensky District
- Time zone: UTC+8:00

Khamney (Russian: Хамней; Buryat: Хамни, Khamni) is a rural locality (a selo) in Zakamensky District, Republic of Buryatia, Russia. The population was 744 as of 2010. There are 20 streets.

== Geography ==
Khamney is located 52 km east of Zakamensk (the district's administrative centre) by road. Usanovka is the nearest rural locality.
