= Mondy =

Mondy is a name and a surname. Notable people with the name include:

- Bill Mondy, American film and television actor
- Duke Mondy (born 1990), American basketball player
- Nell I. Mondy (1921–2005), American biochemist
- Pierre Mondy (1925–2012), French film and theatre actor and director
- Robert W. Mondy (1908–1997), American historian

== See also ==
- Mondy, Republic of Buryatia
