= Yengorboy =

Yengorboy Енгорбой
- Selo
- Location within Republic of Buryatia Location within Russia
- Coordinates: 50°30′N 102°55′E
- Country: Russia
- Region: Republic of Buryatia
- District: Zakamensky District
- Time zone: UTC+8:00

Yengorboy (Russian: Енгорбой) is a rural locality (a selo) in Zakamensky District, Republic of Buryatia, Russia. The population was 736 as of 2010. There are 14 streets.

== Geography ==
Yengorboy is located 49 km northwest of Zakamensk (the district's administrative centre) by road. Shara-Azarga is the nearest rural locality.
