= Ulekchin =

Ulekchin Улекчин
- Selo
- Location within Republic of Buryatia Location within Russia
- Coordinates: 50°28′N 104°17′E
- Country: Russia
- Region: Republic of Buryatia
- District: Zakamensky District
- Time zone: UTC+8:00

Ulekchin (Russian: Улекчин; Buryat: Υлэгшэн, Ülegshen) is a rural locality (a selo) in Zakamensky District, Republic of Buryatia, Russia. The population was 1,180 as of 2010. There are 10 streets.

== Geography ==
Ulekchin is located 86 km east of Zakamensk (the district's administrative centre) by road. Kharatsay is the nearest rural locality.
