= Dzhida, Russia =

Dzhida (Russian: Джида) is the name of several rural localities in Russia:

- Dzhida, Republic of Buryatia, a selo in Dzhidinsky District of the Republic of Buryatia
- Dzhida, Zabaykalsky Krai, a selo in Baleysky District of Zabaykalsky Krai
