= Botsy =

Botsy Боций
- Selo
- Location within Republic of Buryatia Location within Russia
- Coordinates: 50°28′N 105°38′E
- Country: Russia
- Region: Republic of Buryatia
- District: Dzhidinsky District
- Time zone: UTC+8:00

Botsy (Russian: Боций) is a rural locality (a selo) in Dzhidinsky District, Republic of Buryatia, Russia. The population was 550 as of 2010. There are 5 streets.

== Geography ==
Botsy is located 60 km southeast of Petropavlovka (the district's administrative centre) by road. Verkhny Yonkhor is the nearest rural locality.
