= Bayangol (Buryatia) =

Bayangol Баянгол
- Selo
- Location within Republic of Buryatia Location within Russia
- Coordinates: 50°42′N 103°28′E
- Country: Russia
- Region: Republic of Buryatia
- District: Zakamensky District
- Time zone: UTC+8:00

Bayangol (Russian: Баянгол; Buryat: Баян гол, Baian gol) is a village in the Zakamensky District of Buryatia, Russia.

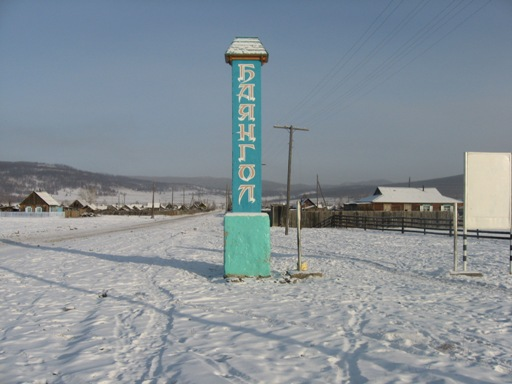
At the entrance to the village of Bayangol

== History ==
In the area where the village now stands, a coal deposit was discovered in the 1930s. At that time, a mining complex was built in Zakamensky district. For his needs, coal was needed, the discovery of deposits of which had by the time. When its development began, the village of Bayangol was built in the mines for workers who arrived from different parts of the USSR.

During World War II, the plant smelted armor for Soviet tanks. The inhabitants of Bayangol worked in its workshops, among whom were representatives of different nationalities - Russians, Buryats, Tatars, Belarusians, Chuvashs, Ukrainians. In 1941, a German-born population previously living in the Volga region was deported to the village.

== Geography ==
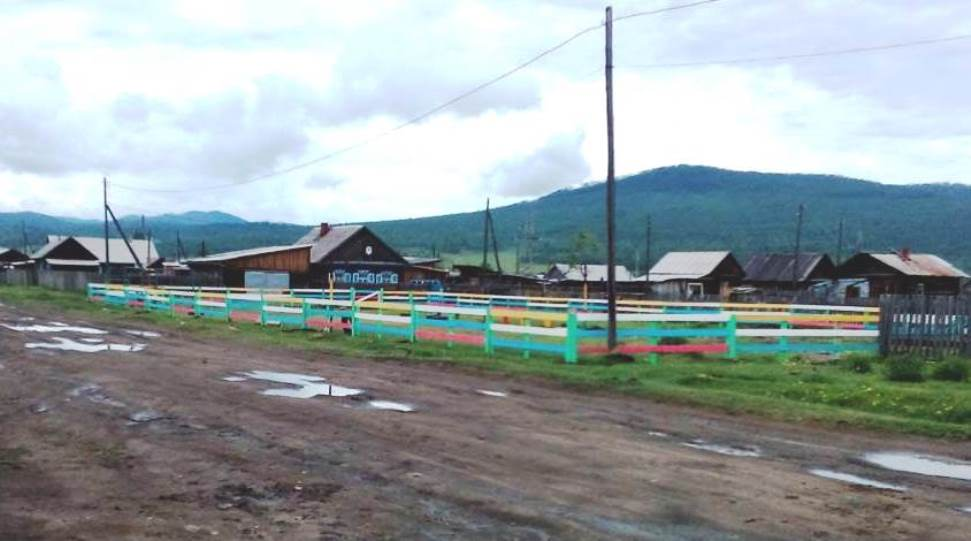
Playground built in spring 2018

The village is located in a mountainous taiga region, 65 km from the city of Zakamensk, 263 km from the railway station Dzhida and 425 km from the city of Ulan-Ude. The river Mylinka flows along the northern outskirts of the village.

Bayangol, along with the uluses Bortoy, Soaps, Tsagan-Morin, is included in the “upper bush” of Zakamensky district.

== Climate ==
In the area where Bayangol is located, the climate is sharply continental. Winters are cold, with dry frost and little snow.

Spring is windy, with frost and almost no precipitation. Summer is short, with hot days and cool nights, with heavy rainfall in July and August.

== Population ==
Gender composition:

As of January 1, 2012: men - 692, women - 641 out of 1333 inhabitants.

National composition:

The population is multinational - Buryats, Russians, Ukrainians, Tatars, Germans and others.

== Infrastructure ==
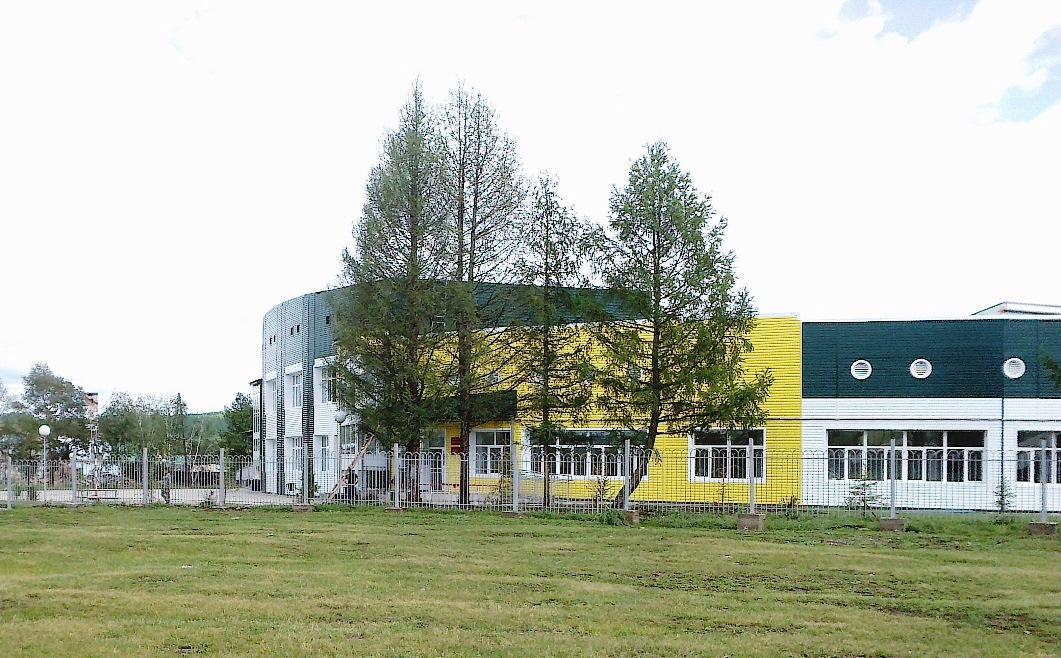
New School Building in Bayangol

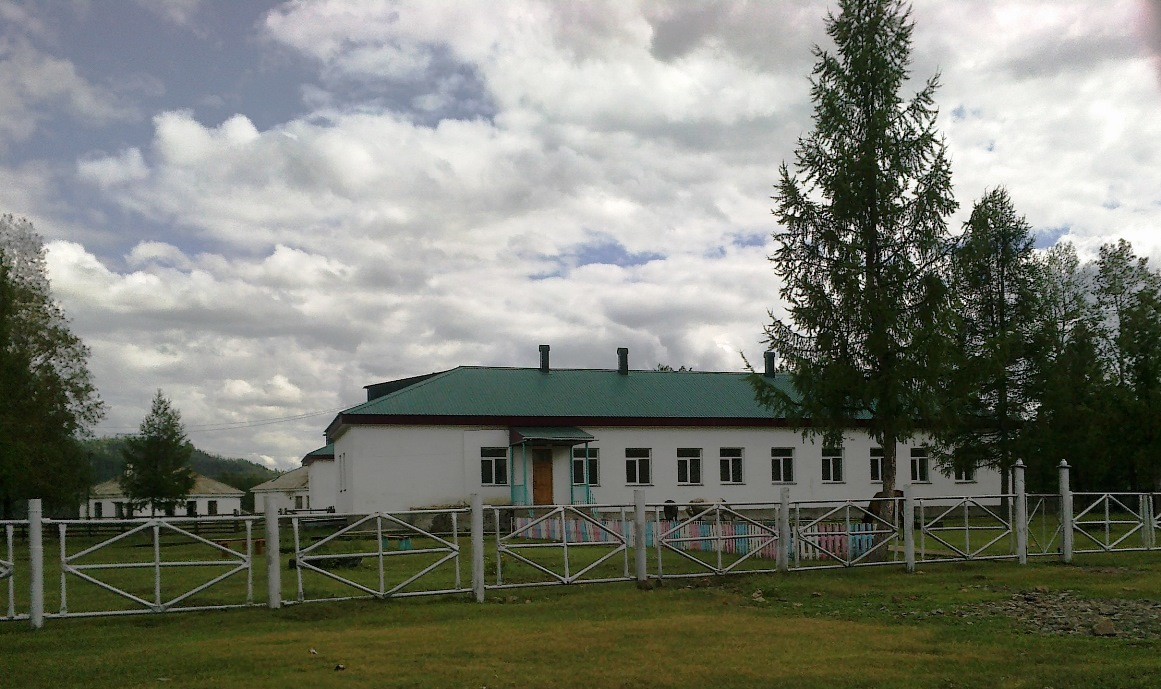
Rural hospital

- 16 streets
- Village Administration
- High school (160 students)
- Kindergarten "Crane"
- Orphanage (for 200 people)
- Local hospital
- Housing department
- Post office
- fire Department
- 4 shops

== Natural resources ==
The territory of the village of Bayangol is located in mountain taiga, in the zone of risky agriculture.

=== Flora ===
Bayangol means in Mongolian "Rich River" which grows many different plant types. These include larch, birch, cedar, lingonberry, blueberry, wild strawberry, blackcurrant, blueberry, sour sour, oil mushrooms, lamb, birch bark, saffron mushroom, wild rose, and bird cherry tree.

In the meadows, various types of herbs and flowers grow.

=== Fauna ===
The taiga around the village of Bayangol is full of diverse representatives of the animal world. Roe deer, squirrels, hares, wild boars, Manchurian deer, musk deer, lynxes, sables, marmots, and tarbagans live here.

The world of predators is represented by bears, foxes and wolves.

Of the birds, cranes, kites, eagles, capercaillie, hazel grouse, partridges, etc. live here.

== See also ==
- Mele (Buryatia)
