= Jida =

Jida may refer to:

- Jida, Masasi Town, Mtwara Region, Tanzania
- Jida Subdistrict, subdistrict of Zhuhai, Guangdong, China
- Jilin University (Jida; 吉大), a public university in Changchun, Jilin, China
- Joint Improvised-Threat Defeat Agency, now Joint Improvised-Threat Defeat Organization, a U.S. Defense Department organization
- Ramat Yishai, Israel, formerly Jida
- Dzhida (disambiguation)
