= Dzhida (air base) =

Airport in Buryatia, Russia

Dzhida Elaegnus
- Dzhida, Buryatia in Russia
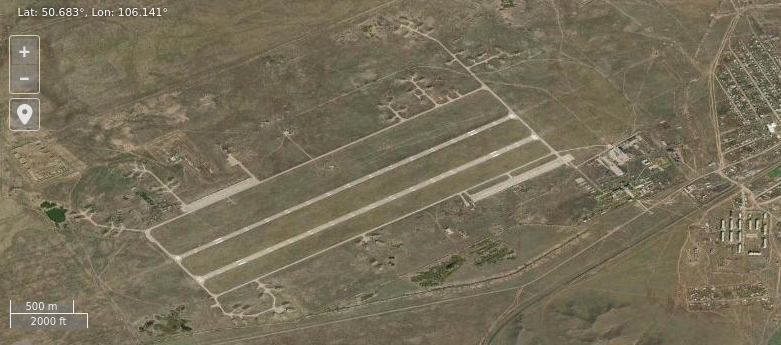
- Satellite imagery of the former Dzhida air base

Site information
- Type: Air Base
- Owner: Ministry of Defence
- Operator: Russian Air Force

Location
- Shown within Buryatia Dzhida (Russia)
- Coordinates: 50°41′0″N 106°8′0″E

Site history
- Built: 1968
- In use: 1968 - 2011

Airfield information
- Identifiers: ICAO: UIID
- Elevation: 600 metres (1,969 ft) AMSL
Runways
Direction	Length and surface
06L/24R	2,500 metres (8,202 ft) Concrete
06R/24L	2,500 metres (8,202 ft) Concrete

Dzhida (Russian: Джида) is a former military air base of the Russian Air Force in Dzhidinsky District, Buryatia, Russia. It was located in the town of Dzhida, and featured a large fighter base with small revetment groups dispersed around the airfield.

Dzhida has been home to:

- 2 Gv BAP (2nd Guards Bomber Aviation Regiment) flying Sukhoi Su-24M aircraft (1969 - 2010).
- 21 BAP (21st Bomber Aviation Regiment) flying Su-24 (1969 - 1983).

The airfield's name has sometimes erroneously appeared as Eleagnus, the Russian form of the Latin name for the plant Elaeagnus, known as dzhida in Russian. The name Dzhida is not derived from the Elaeagnus plant, but from the Buryat language term ƶede, meaning copper.

== See also ==
- List of military airbases in Russia
