= Borgoy mutton =

Sheep's meat produced in Buryatia, Russia

Borgoy mutton is a special type of sheep meat grown under specific conditions in the Dzhida valley in the Uorg Borgoy region (Dzhidinsky District). Is a meat brand of Buryatia.

== Brand history ==
In their time, the Borgoysky mutton was delivered to the table of the royal house of the Romanovs. Borgoysky lamb was present on the menu of a solemn dinner on the occasion of the coronation of Nicholas I. In Soviet times, the meat of Dzhida sheep was sold on the Moscow markets with the label "Borgoiskaya lamb". It was sold in the famous Yeliseyevsky grocery store.

Borgoy sheep live in ideal climatic conditions and graze on saline lands. This gives a special taste to well-known not only throughout the republic meat. The value of dishes from meat Borgoy said in a number of books, publications and travel guides.

In Soviet times, the Borgoy mutton was considered one of the best varieties in the country and even had a great demand abroad. Glory Borgoy mutton attracted the attention of Soviet filmmakers, which was filmed the film "The Shepherds Borghoy".

In the area near Beloozersk, which received its name from the location of White Lake next to it, in the spring salt comes out - «hugir». Salt from the water in the lake appears, which in itself is very dense in chemical composition. Salt mud has cured properties.

Spring winds salt dust rises into the air and spreads to nearby pastures where sheep graze. And this salt affects sweat on meat, rewarding it with peculiar taste properties.

Research shows that mutton contains more than other types of meat, unsaturated fatty acids, very little cholesterol, a high content of the mineral part. Also in this type of meat there is a sufficient amount of valuable components and trace elements including. easily digestible proteins, phosphorus, magnesium, calcium, selenium, vitamins B, E, K, PP, etc.

== Present position ==
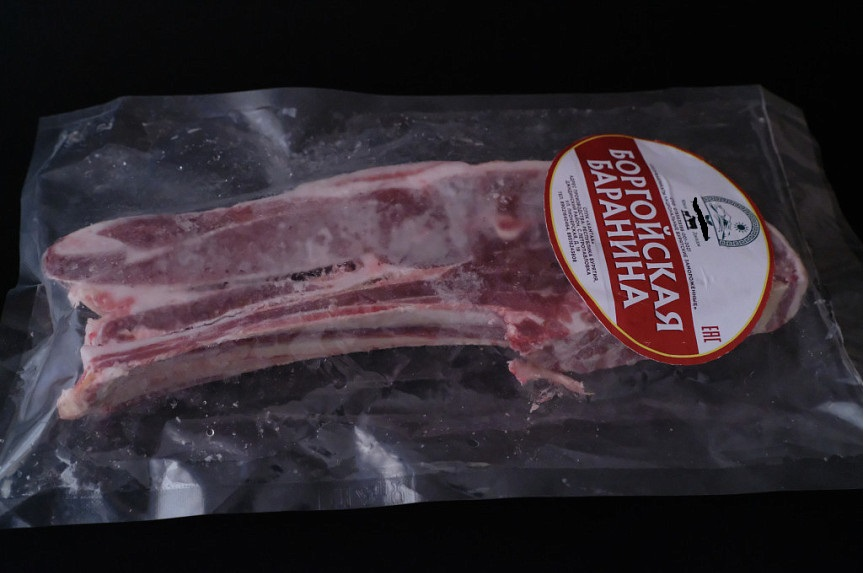
Borgoy lamb meat in a package

After the collapse of the USSR and the collapse of the collective farms, the Borgoy mutton brand was threatened with extinction. A change in the botanical composition of grasses in the Borgoy steppes also had a detrimental effect. Currently, active work is underway to preserve and promote this brand. The Dzhida region, where the Borgoi steppe is located, is considered the meat region of the republic.

The Borgoysky Breeding Plant is one of the largest agricultural enterprises in Buryatia. The company is among the leaders in the livestock of Buryat type sheep of the Trans-Baikal fine-fleece breed. The enterprise was founded in 1927 and since then has been engaged in breeding and breeding work on breeding sheep. According to R.P. Pildanov, Buryat-Mongolian coarse-haired sheep of the state farm “Borgoysky” for 4–4.5 months. of the pasture period, the live weight was increased from 38.9 to 47.5 kg, or by 22.6%. The head of the Chechen Republic, Ramzan Kadyrov, asked Buryatia to provide several sheep for breeding this breed in Chechnya. At present, the Borgoy mutton is claiming the status of the official brand of Buryatia
