= Dutulur =

Dutulur Дутулур
- Ulus
- Location within Republic of Buryatia Location within Russia
- Coordinates: 50°26′N 103°22′E
- Country: Russia
- Region: Republic of Buryatia
- District: Zakamensky District
- Time zone: UTC+8:00

Dutulur (Russian: Дутулур; Buryat: Дγтэлγγр, Dütelüür) is a rural locality (an ulus) in Zakamensky District, Republic of Buryatia, Russia. The population was 938 as of 2010. There are 9 streets.

== Geography ==
Dutulur is located 12 km northeast of Zakamensk (the district's administrative centre) by road. Zakamensk is the nearest rural locality.
