= Nizhny Burgaltay =

Nizhny Burgaltay Нижний Бургалтай
- Selo
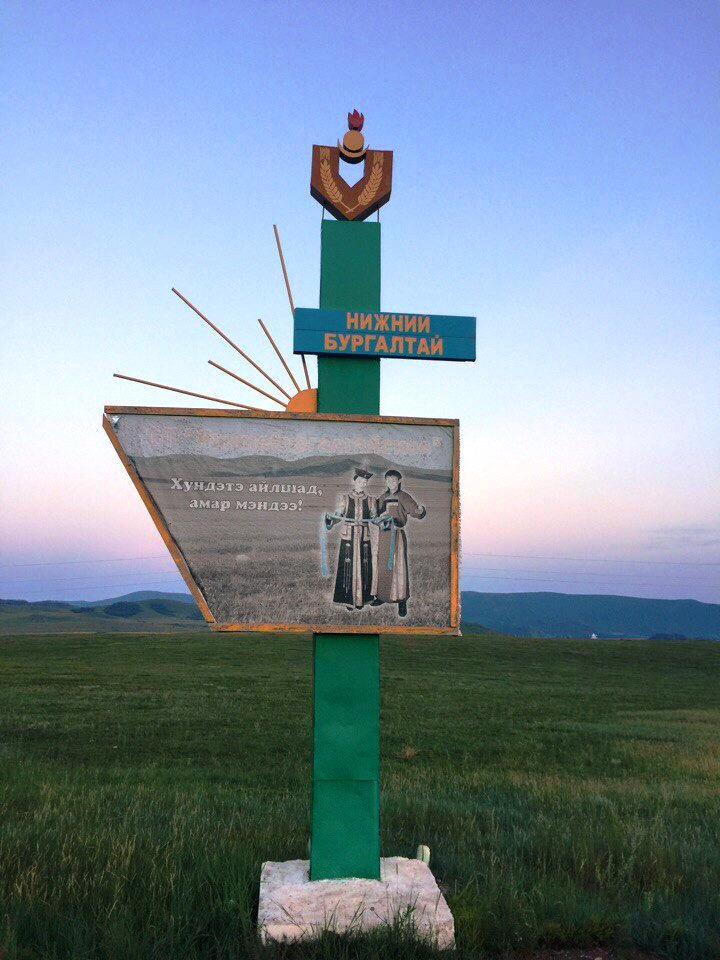
- At the entrance to the village of Nizhny Burgultay

- Location within Republic of Buryatia Location within Russia
- Coordinates: 50°33′N 105°07′E
- Country: Russia
- Region: Republic of Buryatia
- District: Dzhidinsky District
- Time zone: UTC+8:00

Nizhny Burgaltay (Russian: Нижний Бургалтай; Buryat: Доодо Бургалтай, Doodo Burgaltai) is a rural locality (a selo) in Dzhidinsky District, Republic of Buryatia, Russia. The population was 675 as of 2017. There are 9 streets.

== Geography ==
Nizhny Burgaltay is located 16 km southwest of Petropavlovka (the district's administrative centre) by road. Verkhny Burgaltay is the nearest rural locality.
