= Nizhny Torey =

Nizhny Torey Нижний Торей
- Selo
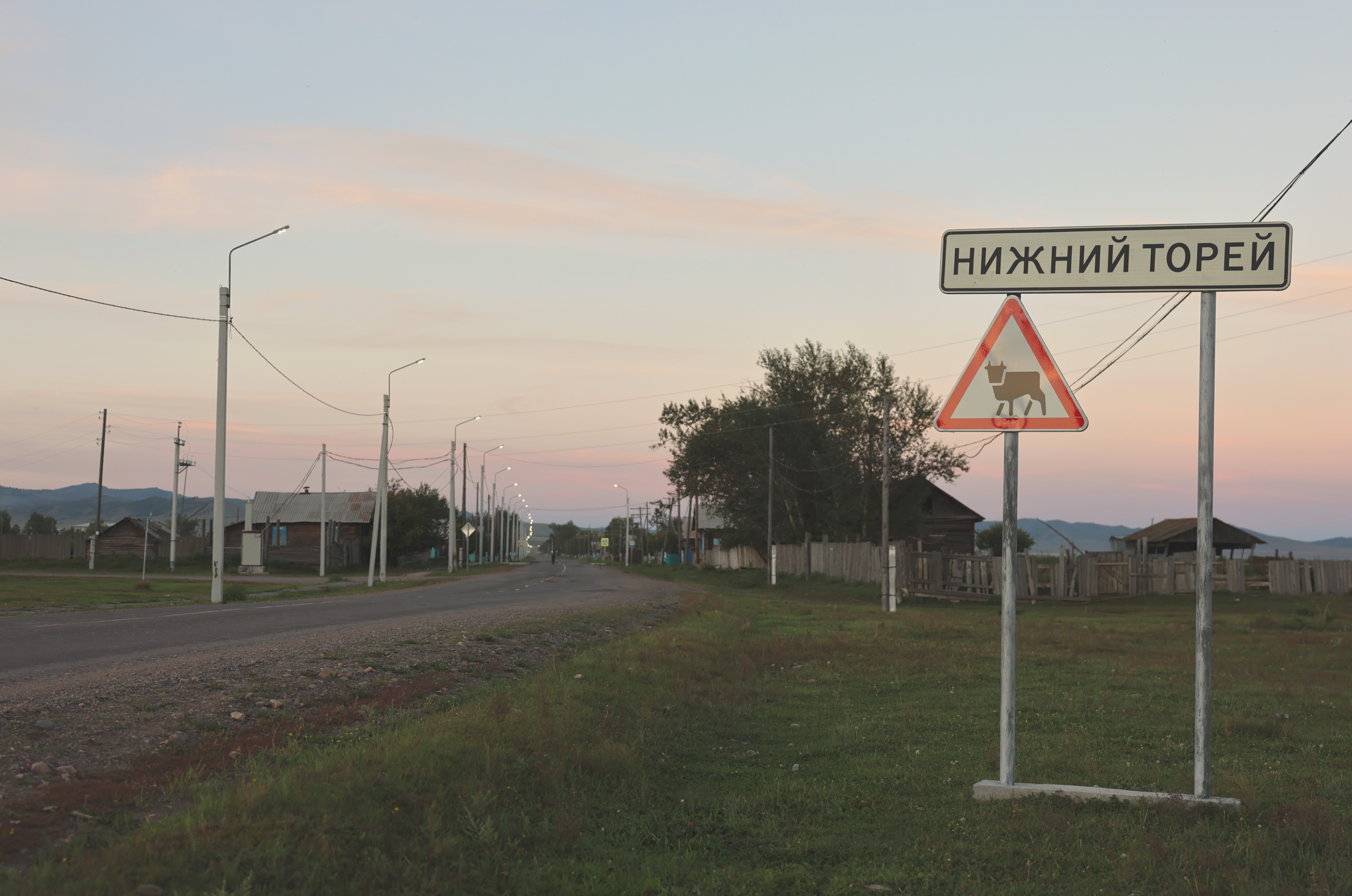
- Western entrance to the village of Nizhniy Torey

- Location within Republic of Buryatia Location within Russia
- Coordinates: 50°31′N 104°49′E
- Country: Russia
- Region: Republic of Buryatia
- District: Dzhidinsky District

Population (2010)
  - Total: 1,251
- Time zone: UTC+8:00
- Postal code: 671925

Nizhny Torey (Russian: Нижний Торей; Buryat: Доодо Тори, Doodo Tori) is a rural locality (a selo) in Dzhidinsky District, Republic of Buryatia, Russia. The population was 1,251 as of 2010. There are 20 streets.

== Geography ==
Nizhny Torey is located 37 km southwest of Petropavlovka (the district's administrative centre) by road. Oyor is the nearest rural locality.
