= Chikoy =

Chikoy may refer to:

- Chikoy (rural locality), a former urban-type settlement in the Republic of Buryatia, Russia; since 2004—a rural locality (a selo)
- Chikoy (river), a river in Zabaykalsky Krai and the Republic of Buryatia in Russia
