= Oyor =

Oyor Оёр
- Selo
- Location within Republic of Buryatia Location within Russia
- Coordinates: 50°32′N 104°58′E
- Country: Russia
- Region: Republic of Buryatia
- District: Dzhidinsky District
- Time zone: UTC+8:00

Oyor (Russian: Оёр; Buryat: Оёор, Oyoor) is a rural locality (a selo) in Dzhidinsky District, Republic of Buryatia, Russia. The population was 771 as of 2010. There are 19 streets.

== Geography ==
Oyor is located 25 km southwest of Petropavlovka (the district's administrative centre) by road. Stary Ukyrchelon is the nearest rural locality.
