= Naryn, Dzhidinsky District, Republic of Buryatia =

Naryn Нарын
- Selo
- Location within Republic of Buryatia Location within Russia
- Coordinates: 50°32′N 104°33′E
- Country: Russia
- Region: Republic of Buryatia
- District: Dzhidinsky District
- Time zone: UTC+8:00

Naryn (Russian: Нарын; Buryat: Нарин, Narin) is a rural locality (a selo) in Dzhidinsky District, Republic of Buryatia, Russia. The population was 357 as of 2017. There are 2 streets.

== Geography ==
Naryn is located 64 km west of Petropavlovka (the district's administrative centre) by road. Kharatsay is the nearest rural locality.
