= Naushki =

Naushki Наушки
- Urban-type settlement
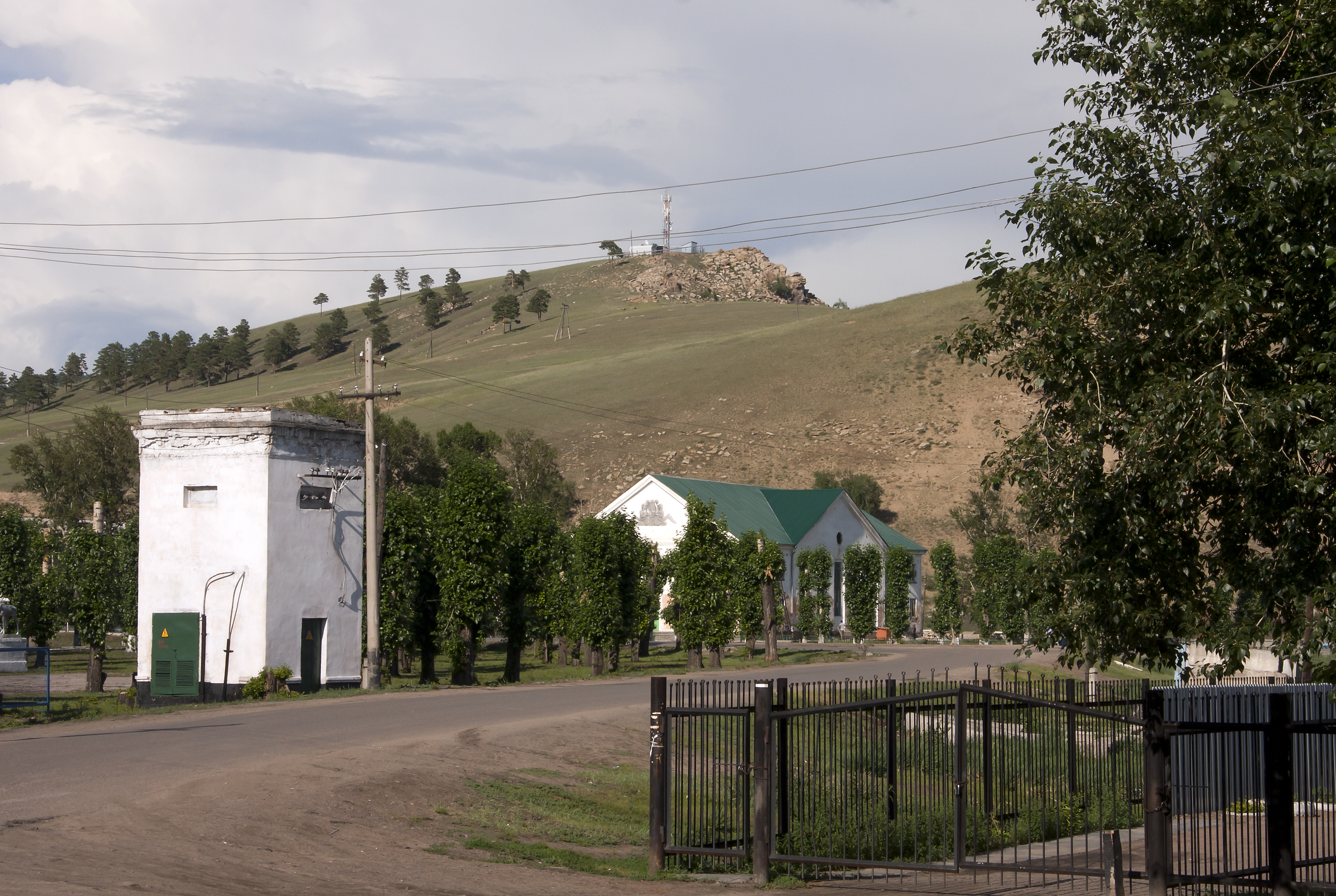
- A street in Naushki
- Interactive map of Naushki
- Location of Naushki Naushki (Republic of Buryatia)
- Coordinates: 50°23′19″N 106°06′16″E
- Country: Russia
- Federal subject: Buryatia
- Administrative district: Kyakhtinsky District
- Urban-type settlementSelsoviet: Naushki Urban-Type Settlement
- Elevation: 617 m (2,024 ft)

Population (2010 Census)
  - Total: 3,409
  - Estimate (2025): 2,194 (−35.6%)

Administrative status
  - Capital of: Naushki Urban-Type Settlement

Municipal status
  - Municipal district: Kyakhtinsky Municipal District
  - Urban settlement: Naushkinskoye Urban Settlement
  - Capital of: Naushkinskoye Urban Settlement
- Time zone: UTC+8 (MSK+5)
- Postal code: 671820
- OKTMO ID: 81633155051

Naushki population
- 2010 Census: 3,409
- 2002 Census: 3,575
- 1989 Census: 4,167
- 1979 Census: 3,739

Naushki (Russian: На́ушки; Buryat: Наашхи, Naashkhi) is an urban locality (an urban-type settlement) in Kyakhtinsky District of the Republic of Buryatia, Russia, located near the border with Mongolia, 30 kilometers (19 mi) from the town of Kyakhta. As of the 2010 Census, its population was 3,409.

== Administrative and municipal status ==
Within the framework of administrative divisions, the urban-type settlement (inhabited locality) of Naushki is incorporated within Kyakhtinsky District as Naushki Urban-Type Settlement (an administrative division of the district). As a municipal division, Naushki Urban-Type Settlement is incorporated within Kyakhtinsky Municipal District as Naushkinskoye Urban Settlement.

== Transportation ==
Naushki is Russia's border station on the Trans-Mongolian Railway, which connects Russia with Mongolia and continues on to China. The counterpart station on the Mongolian side is Sükhbaatar.
