= Myla, Russia =

Myla Мыла
- Selo
- Location within Republic of Buryatia Location within Russia
- Coordinates: 50°44′N 103°26′E
- Country: Russia
- Region: Republic of Buryatia
- District: Zakamensky District
- Time zone: UTC+8:00

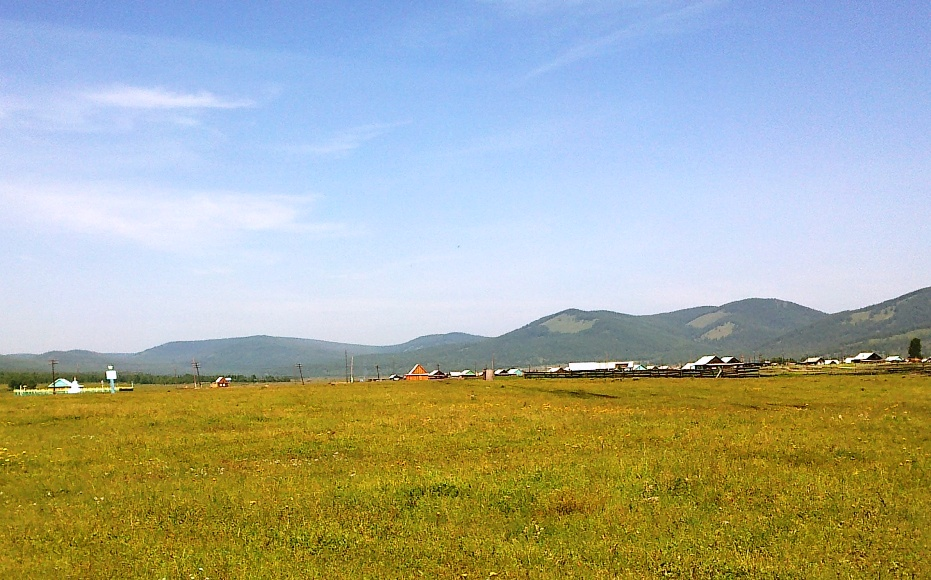
Village Mele

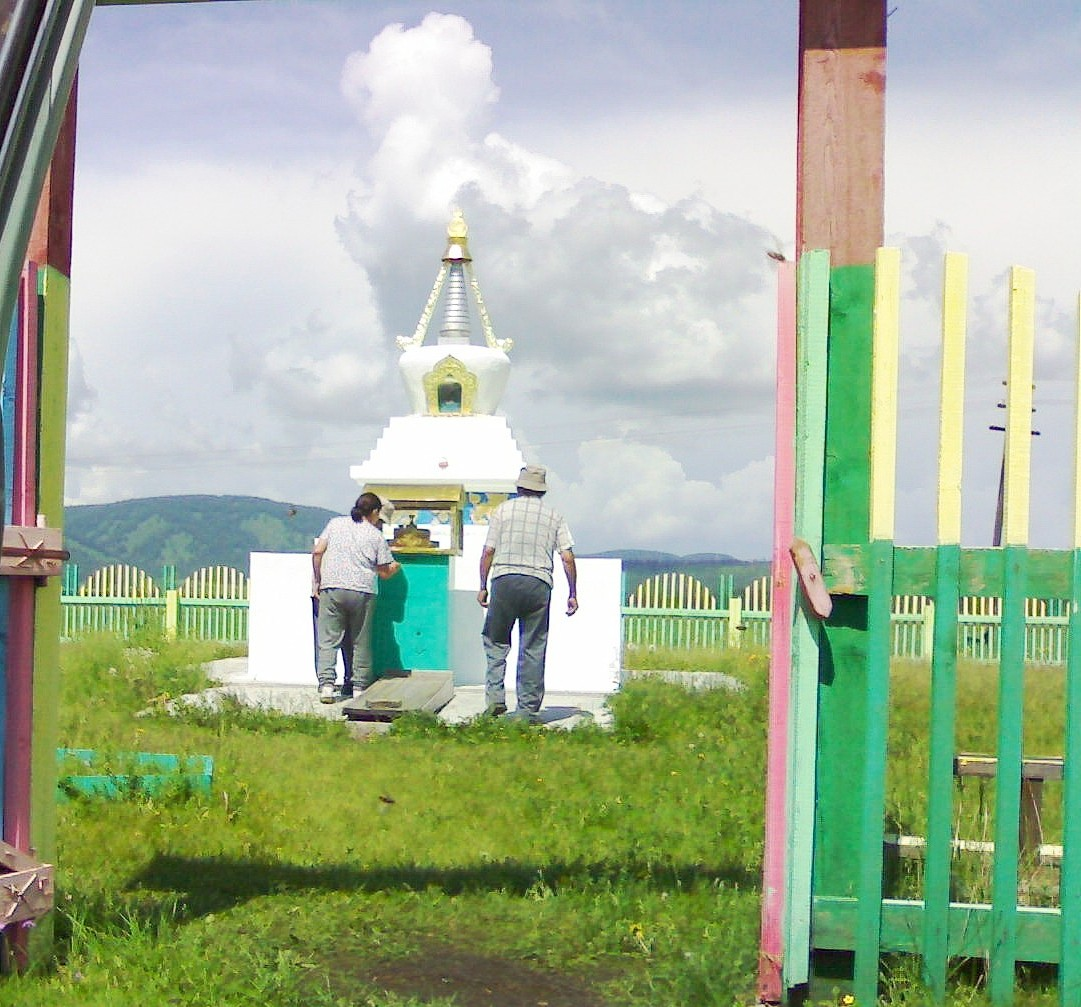
Suburgan (Buddhist stupa) at the entrance to the village of Mele

Myla (Russian: Мыла; Buryat: Мэлэ, Mele) or Mele is a rural locality (a selo) in Zakamensky District, Republic of Buryatia, Russia. The population was 664 as of 2010. There are 14 streets.

There are several speculations about the origin of the name “Mele”: on behalf of one of its first settlers, a certain Melahei, or from Evenki Malu - ‘an honorable place in the plague’, or from mu ‘water’ and ala ‘fish’.

In 1924, a school was built in the settlement (ulus). In 1929, an agricultural artel was formed, later becoming the Red Star collective farm. In 1957, the collective farm received a new name, translated as "40 years of October". In 1992, the collective farm broke up into individual peasant farms.

Mele is the only settlement in the south of Buryatia where hamnigans live in high density. Even in Tsarist times, the Zakamensky (Armak) Hamnigans served Cossack service on the southern border with Mongolia. They believe that they came to Zakamna because of Lake Baikal and gave rise to a new small Buryat-Hamnigan group, which currently includes about 400 people, making up more than half of the population of Myla.

== Geography ==
Myla is located 65 km north of Zakamensk (the district's administrative centre) by road. Bayangol is the nearest rural locality.
