= Bolshaya Kudara =

Bolshaya Kudara Большая Кудара
- Selo
- Location within Republic of Buryatia Location within Russia
- Coordinates: 50°12′N 107°02′E
- Country: Russia
- Region: Republic of Buryatia
- District: Kyakhtinsky District
- Time zone: UTC+8:00

Bolshaya Kudara (Russian: Большая Кудара; Buryat: Ехэ Хγдэри, Yekhe Khüderi) is a rural locality (a selo) in Kyakhtinsky District, Republic of Buryatia, Russia. The population was 740 as of 2010. There are 17 streets.

== Geography ==
Bolshaya Kudara is located 65 km southeast of Kyakhta (the district's administrative centre) by road. Oktyabrsky is the nearest rural locality.
