= Bayangol, Barguzinsky District, Republic of Buryatia =

Bayangol Баянгол
- Ulus
- Location within Republic of Buryatia Location within Russia
- Coordinates: 53°46′N 110°16′E
- Country: Russia
- Region: Republic of Buryatia
- District: Barguzinsky District
- Time zone: UTC+8:00

Bayangol (Russian: Баянгол; Buryat: Баян гол) is a rural locality (an ulus) in Barguzinsky District, Republic of Buryatia, Russia. The population was 1,351 as of 2010. There are 16 streets.

== Geography ==
Bayangol is located 65 km northeast of Barguzin (the district's administrative centre) by road. Yubileyny is the nearest rural locality.
