= Verkhny Ulkhun =

Verkhny Ulkhun Верхний Ульхун
- Selo
- Location within Zabaykalsky Krai Location within Russia
- Coordinates: 49°34′N 112°32′E
- Country: Russia
- Region: Zabaykalsky Krai
- District: Kyrinsky District
- Time zone: UTC+9:00

Verkhny Ulkhun (Russian: Верхний Ульхун) is a rural locality (a selo) in Kyrinsky District, Zabaykalsky Krai, Russia. Population: 649 (2021 census); 818 (2010 census); 1,127 (2002 census); There are 10 streets in this selo.

== Geography ==
This rural locality is located 41 km from Kyra (the district's administrative centre), 282 km from Chita (capital of Zabaykalsky Krai) and 5,446 km from Moscow. Tyrin is the nearest rural locality.
