= Turan, Republic of Buryatia =

Turan Туран
- Selo
- Location within Republic of Buryatia Location within Russia
- Coordinates: 51°38′N 101°39′E
- Country: Russia
- Region: Republic of Buryatia
- District: Tunkinsky District
- Time zone: UTC+8:00

Turan (Russian: Туран) is a rural locality (a selo) in Tunkinsky District, Republic of Buryatia, Russia. The population was 711 as of 2010. There are 20 streets.

== Geography ==
Turan is located 34 km west of Kyren (the district's administrative centre) by road. Khoyto-Gol is the nearest rural locality.
