= Sükhbaatar (city) =

Provincial capital of Selenge Province, Mongolia

Sükhbaatar Сүхбаатар ᠰᠦᠬᠡᠪᠠᠭᠠᠲᠤᠷ
- District
- Sükhbaatar District; Сүхбаатар сум ᠰᠦᠬᠡᠪᠠᠭᠠᠲᠤᠷᠰᠤᠮᠤ
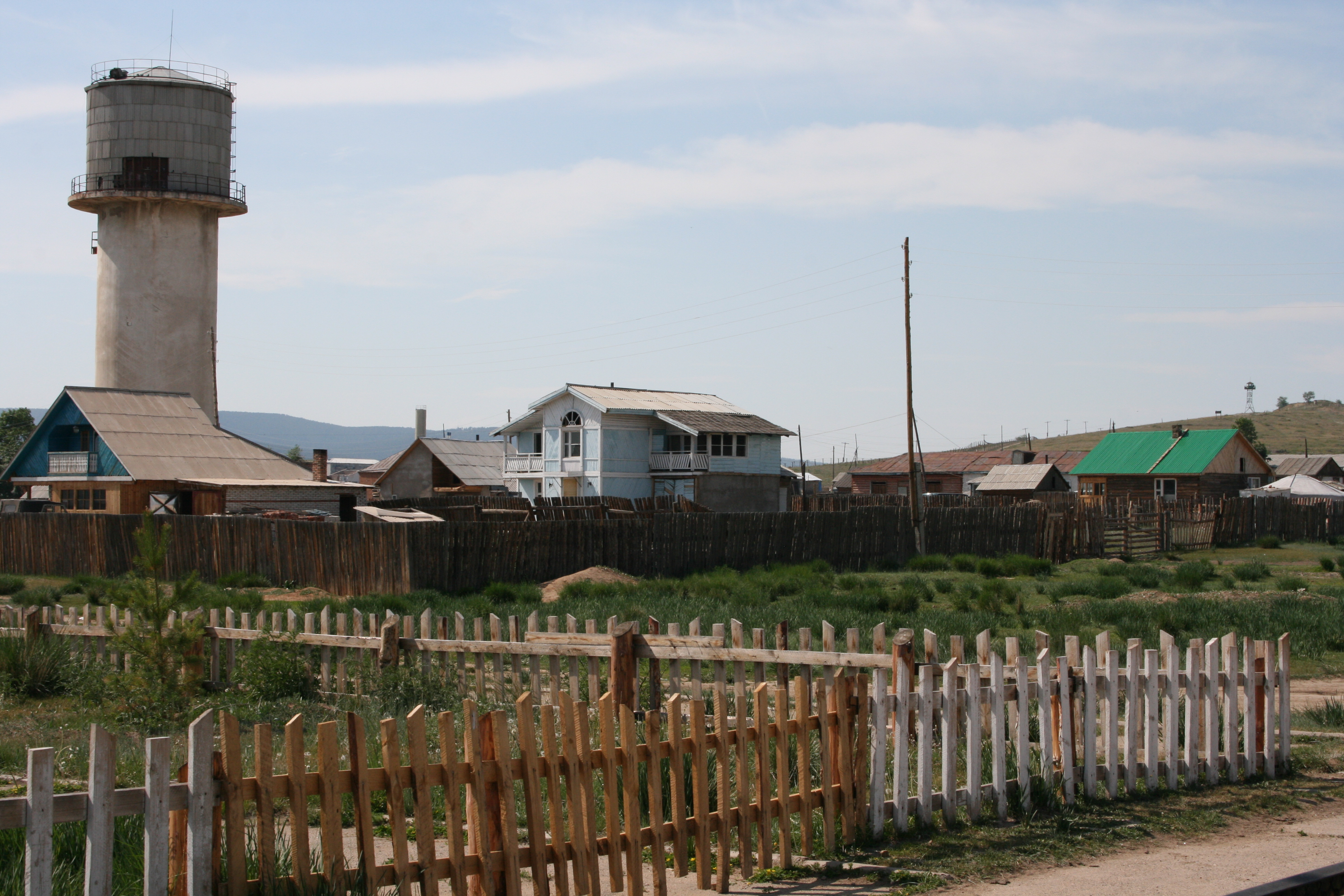
- Sükhbaatar outskirts with Russian border in the background

- Location in Mongolia
- Coordinates: 50°14′11″N 106°12′23″E
- Country: Mongolia
- Province: Selenge Province
- Founded: 1940

Area
  - Total: 45.0 km^{2} (17.4 sq mi)
- Elevation: 1,124 m (3,688 ft)

Population (2017)
  - Total: 22,741
  - Density: 505/km^{2} (1,310/sq mi)
- Climate: Dwb

Sükhbaatar (Mongolian: Сүхбаатар [suxpá(ː)tʰər]) is the capital of Selenge Province in northern Mongolia, on the Orkhon river. As of late 2007, the city population is 19,224.

== History ==
The city was founded in 1940 and named after the Mongolian revolutionary leader Damdin Sükhbaatar.

== Administrative divisions ==
The district is divided into eight bags, which are:

- Bayankhaan
- Borguvee
- Buurkheer
- Ganzam
- Khongormorit
- Orkhon
- Salkhit
- Tsagaan-Ereg

== Climate ==
Sükhbaatar has a dry-winter warm-summer continental climate (Köppen Dwb).

Climate data for Sukhbaatar, 1981–2010
Month	Jan	Feb	Mar	Apr	May	Jun	Jul	Aug	Sep	Oct	Nov	Dec	Year
Mean daily maximum °C (°F)	−17.1 (1.2)	−10.4 (13.3)	1.3 (34.3)	12.1 (53.8)	20.2 (68.4)	25.3 (77.5)	26.9 (80.4)	24.5 (76.1)	18.1 (64.6)	9.1 (48.4)	−3.8 (25.2)	−14.0 (6.8)	7.7 (45.8)
Mean daily minimum °C (°F)	−27.5 (−17.5)	−23.9 (−11.0)	−13.2 (8.2)	−3.1 (26.4)	4.1 (39.4)	10.5 (50.9)	14.1 (57.4)	11.7 (53.1)	4.4 (39.9)	−3.8 (25.2)	−14.4 (6.1)	−23.4 (−10.1)	−5.4 (22.3)
Average precipitation mm (inches)	3.2 (0.13)	2.4 (0.09)	3.0 (0.12)	8.3 (0.33)	24.7 (0.97)	52.0 (2.05)	67.7 (2.67)	69.9 (2.75)	33.8 (1.33)	9.2 (0.36)	6.2 (0.24)	4.0 (0.16)	284.4 (11.2)
Average precipitation days	6.6	4.5	5.9	6.5	10.2	14.4	16.9	15.0	10.6	6.5	6.7	7.1	110.9
Source: World Meteorological Organization

== Transport ==
Sükhbaatar is the northernmost railway station on the Trans-Mongolian Railway in Mongolia. The first railway station on the Russian side of the border is Naushki.

Taxi service is available at the railway station and about a block north. Taxis offer service within Sükhbaatar as well as neighbouring Sums, like Shaamar (10,000–15,000 tugs for whole car or 2,000 per person), you can also get a taxi to Darkhan for 8,000–10,000 tugs per person.
