= Ust-Dunguy =

Ust-Dunguy Усть-Дунгуй
- Selo
- Location within Republic of Buryatia Location within Russia
- Coordinates: 49°59′N 107°40′E
- Country: Russia
- Region: Republic of Buryatia
- District: Kyakhtinsky District
- Time zone: UTC+8:00

Ust-Dunguy (Russian: Усть-Дунгуй; Buryat: Дунгуйн Адаг, Dunguin Adag) is a rural locality (a selo) in Kyakhtinsky District, Republic of Buryatia, Russia. The population was 712 as of 2010. There are 5 streets.

== Geography ==
Ust-Dunguy is located 124 km southeast of Kyakhta (the district's administrative centre) by road. Anagustay is the nearest rural locality.
