= Bayan-Gol =

Bayan-Gol Баян-Гол
- Ulus
- Location within Republic of Buryatia Location within Russia
- Coordinates: 52°10′N 109°20′E
- Country: Russia
- Region: Republic of Buryatia
- District: Khorinsky District
- Time zone: UTC+8:00

Bayan-Gol (Russian: Баян-Гол) is a rural locality (an ulus) in Khorinsky District, Republic of Buryatia, Russia. The population was 334 as of 2010. There are 10 streets.

== Geography ==
Bayan-Gol is located 35 km west of Khorinsk (the district's administrative centre) by road. Udinsk is the nearest rural locality.
