= Tashanta, Altai Republic =

Tashanta Ташанта
- Village
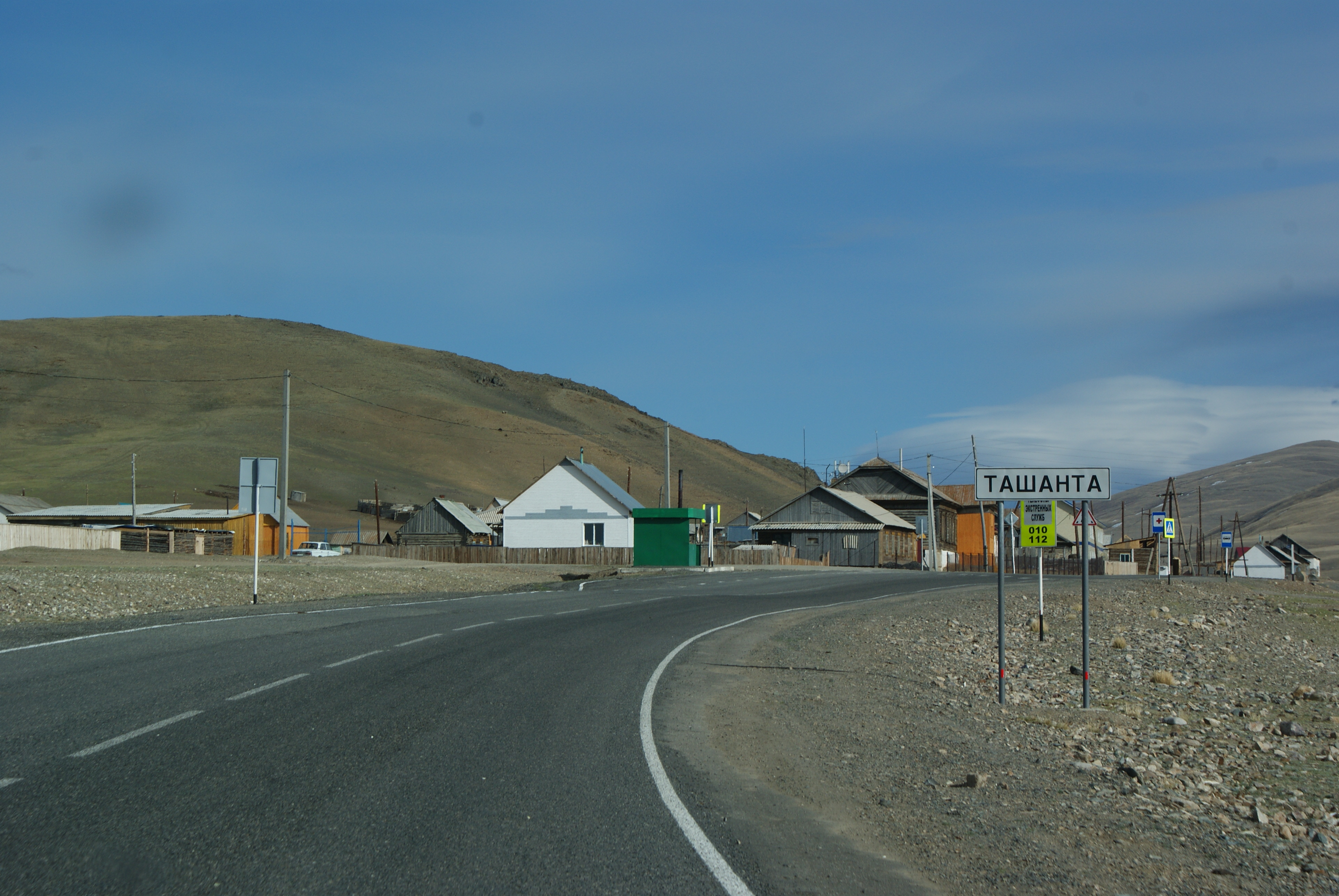

- Location within Altai Republic Location within Russia
- Coordinates: 49°42′N 89°11′E
- Country: Russia
- Region: Altai Republic
- District: Kosh-Agachsky District
- Time zone: UTC+7:00

Tashanta (Russian: Ташанта; Altay: Тожоҥты, Tojoñtı) is a rural locality (a selo) and the administrative centre of Tashantinskoye Rural Settlement of Kosh-Agachsky District, the Altai Republic, Russia. The population was 547 as of 2016. There are 13 streets.

== Geography ==
Tashanta is located on the bank of the river Tashantinki near the Russian border with Mongolia, 51 km southeast of Kosh-Agach (the district's administrative centre) by road. Zhana-Aul is the nearest rural locality.
