= Mondy, Republic of Buryatia =

Mondy Монды
- Settlement
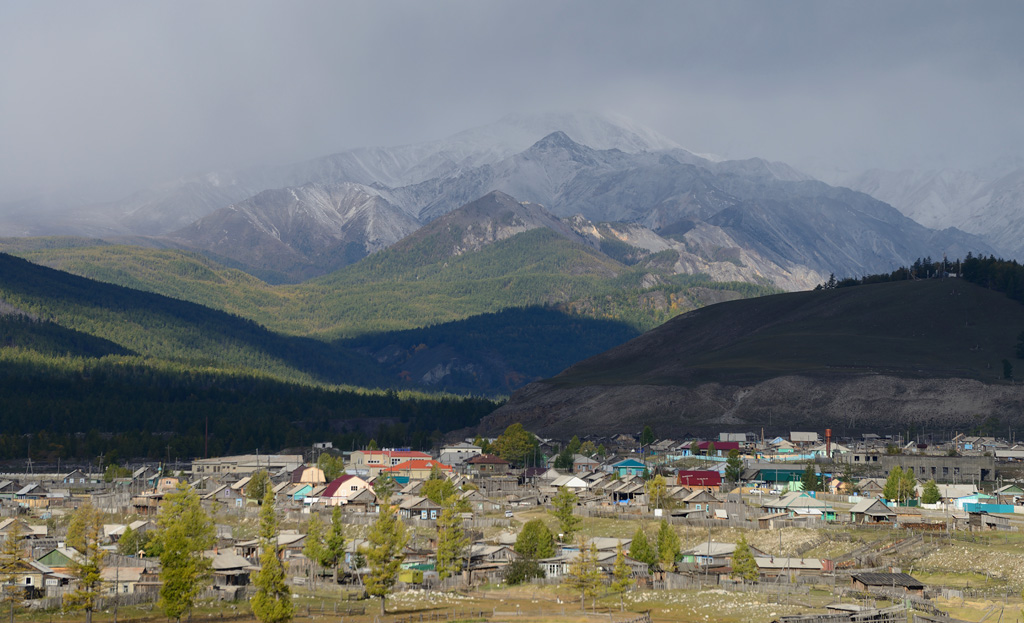
- The village with the Mönkh Saridag in the background

- Location within Republic of Buryatia Location within Russia
- Coordinates: 51°40′N 100°59′E
- Country: Russia
- Region: Republic of Buryatia
- District: Tunkinsky District
- Time zone: UTC+8:00

Mondy (Russian: Монды; Buryat: Моондо, Moondo) is a rural locality (a settlement) in Tunkinsky District, Republic of Buryatia, Russia. The population was 1,000 as of 2010. There are 18 streets.

== Geography ==
Mondy is located 84 km west of Kyren (the district's administrative centre) by road. Turan is the nearest rural locality.
