= Dzhida, Republic of Buryatia =

Dzhida Джида
- Selo
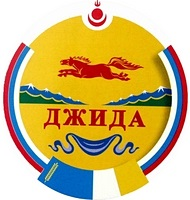
- Seal

- Location within Republic of Buryatia Location within Russia
- Coordinates: 50°40′N 106°10′E
- Country: Russia
- Region: Republic of Buryatia
- District: Dzhidinsky District
- Time zone: UTC+8:00

Dzhida (Russian: Джида; Buryat: Жада / Зэдэ, Jada / Zede) is a rural locality (a selo) in Dzhidinsky District, Republic of Buryatia, Russia. The population was 3,178 as of 2017. There are 34 streets.

== Geography ==
Dzhida is located 65 km east of Petropavlovka (the district's administrative centre) by road. Dyrestuy is the nearest rural locality.
