= Chikoy (rural locality) =

Chikoy Чикой
- Selo
- Location within Republic of Buryatia Location within Russia
- Coordinates: 50°16′N 106°54′E
- Country: Russia
- Region: Republic of Buryatia
- District: Kyakhtinsky District
- Time zone: UTC+8:00

Chikoy (Russian: Чикой; Buryat: Сүхэ, Sükhe) is a rural locality (a selo) in Kyakhtinsky District, Republic of Buryatia, Russia. The population was 675 as of 2010. There are 15 streets.

== Geography ==
Chikoy is located 46 km southeast of Kyakhta (the district's administrative centre) by road. Kurort Kiran is the nearest rural locality.
