= Zakamensky District =

Zakamensky District Закаменский район (Russian)
- District

Other transcription(s)
  - Buryat: Захааминай аймаг
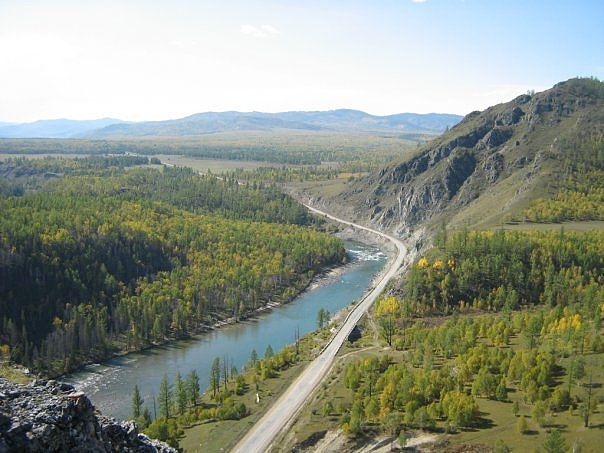
- Landscape in Zakamensky District

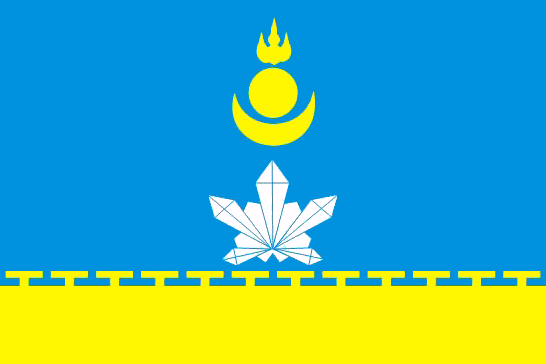
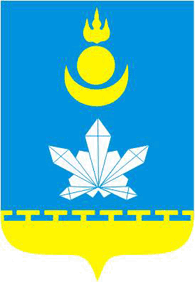
- Flag Coat of arms
- Location of Zakamensky District in the Buryat Republic
- Coordinates: 55°45′N 103°26′E
- Country: Russia
- Federal subject: Republic of Buryatia
- Established: 1927
- Administrative center: Zakamensk

Area
  - Total: 15,320 km^{2} (5,920 sq mi)

Population (2010 Census)
  - Total: 28,453
  - Density: 1.857/km^{2} (4.810/sq mi)
  - Urban: 40.5%
  - Rural: 59.5%

Administrative structure
  - Administrative divisions: 1 Towns, 5 Selsoviets, 18 Somons
  - Inhabited localities: 1 cities/towns, 26 rural localities

Municipal structure
  - Municipally incorporated as: Zakamensky Municipal District
  - Municipal divisions: 1 urban settlements, 22 rural settlements
- Time zone: UTC+8 (MSK+5)
- OKTMO ID: 81621000
- Website: http://mcu-zakamna.ru

Population of Zakamensky District
- 2010 Census: 28,453
- 2002 Census: 29,692
- 1989 Census: 34,533
- 1979 Census: 32,372

Zakamensky District (Russian: Зака́менский райо́н; Buryat: Захааминай аймаг, Zakhaaminai aimag) is an administrative and municipal district (raion), one of the twenty-one in the Republic of Buryatia, Russia. It is located in the southwest of the republic. The area of the district is 15,320 square kilometers (5,920 sq mi). Its administrative center is the town of Zakamensk. As of the 2010 Census, the total population of the district was 28,453, with the population of Zakamensk accounting for 40.5% of that number.

== Administrative and municipal status ==
Within the framework of administrative divisions, Zakamensky District is one of the twenty-one in the Republic of Buryatia. It is divided into one town (an administrative division with the administrative center in the town (an inhabited locality) of Zakamensk), five selsoviets, and eighteen somons, which comprise twenty-six rural localities. As a municipal division, the district is incorporated as Zakamensky Municipal District. The Town of Zakamensk and Kholtosonsky Selsoviet are incorporated as Zakamensk Urban Settlement, while the remaining four selsoviets and eighteen somons are incorporated into twenty-two rural settlements within the municipal district. The town of Zakamensk serves as the administrative center of both the administrative and municipal district.

=== History of the municipal divisions ===
Kholtosonsky Selsoviet used to be municipally incorporated as Kholtosonskoye Rural Settlement, but the latter was merged into Zakamensk Urban Settlement on July 18, 2015.

== See also ==
- Mele (Buryatia)
