= Zakamensk =

Town in the Republic of Buryatia, Russia

Zakamensk Закаменск
- Town

Other transcription(s)
  - Buryat: Захаамин
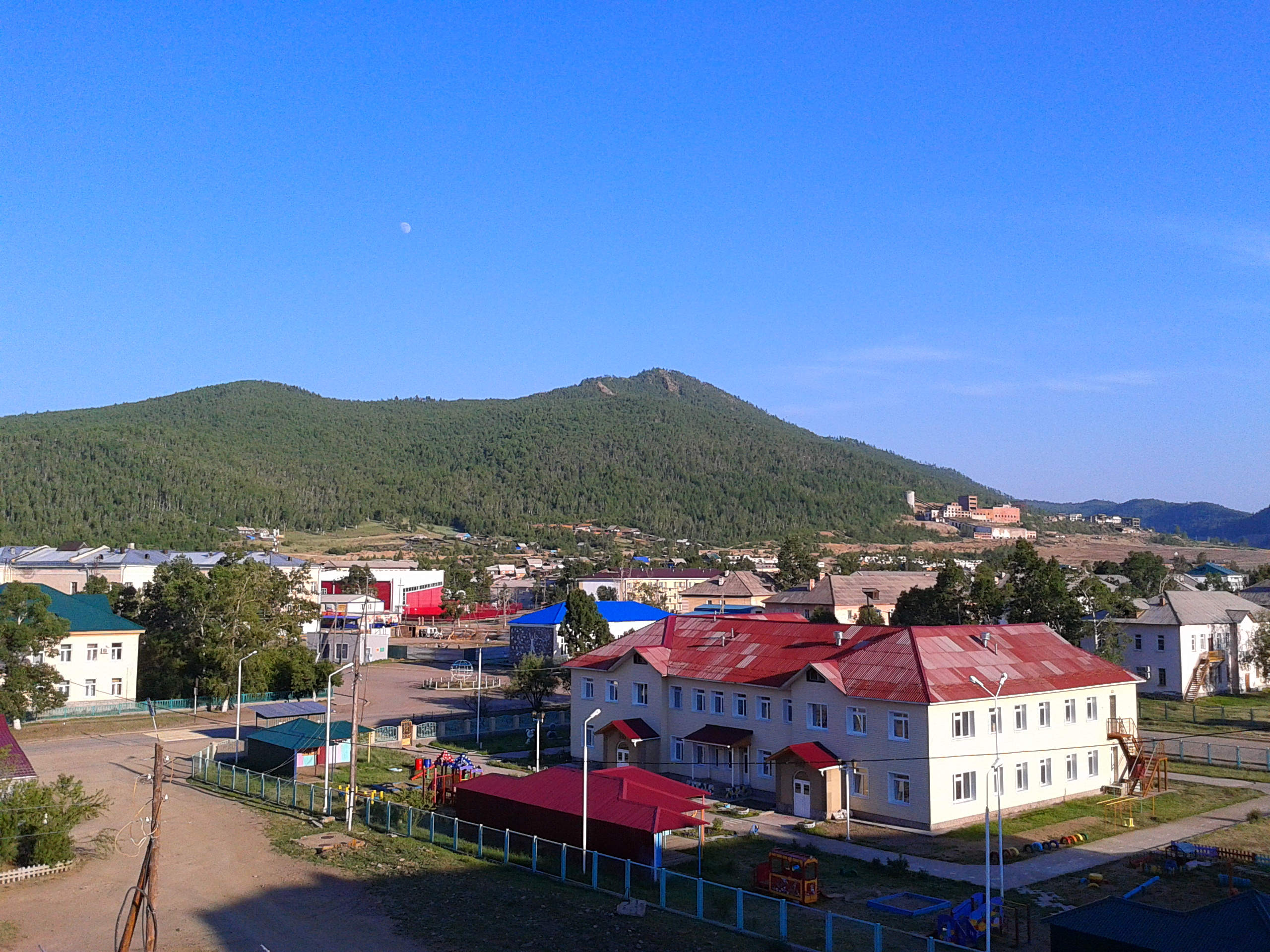
- Zakamensk town center
- Interactive map of Zakamensk
- Location of Zakamensk Zakamensk (Republic of Buryatia)
- Coordinates: 50°23′N 103°18′E
- Country: Russia
- Federal subject: Buryatia
- Administrative district: Zakamensky District
- TownSelsoviet: Zakamensk
- Founded: 1893
- Town status since: 1944
- Elevation: 1,100 m (3,600 ft)

Population (2010 Census)
  - Total: 11,524
  - Estimate (2025): 10,556 (−8.4%)

Administrative status
  - Capital of: Zakamensky District, Town of Zakamensk

Municipal status
  - Municipal district: Zakamensky Municipal District
  - Urban settlement: Zakamensk Urban Settlement
  - Capital of: Zakamensky Municipal District, Zakamensk Urban Settlement
- Time zone: UTC+8 (MSK+5)
- Postal codes: 671950, 671959
- Dialing code: +7 301370
- OKTMO ID: 81621101001

Zakamensk (Russian: Зака́менск; Buryat: Захаамин, Zahaamin; before 1959 – Gorodok) is a city of a regional significance in Russia, administration center of Zakamensky District of the Republic of Buryatia. Since 2015 the city has an honorary international title "The city of Labor Valor and Glory"

== History ==
The history of the city has close ties with the history and development of deposits of tungsten and molybdenum in the Dzhida ore node and the production of tungsten and molybdenum concentrate at the Dzhidinsky mining and processing plant.

In 1929, the doctor of geological and mineralogical sciences A.V. Arsen'ev made a justification about the presence of a tungsten deposit in the Zakamensk district of the Buryat-Mongolian ASSR.

On July 9, 1932, a geological party led by M.V Besova uncovered the first quartz vein with large wolframite crystals in the Gurjirka fall, discovering the Dzhida tungsten deposit.

=== Mining village ===
On March 2, 1933, the working village of Gorodok has been established.

On October 11, 1934, People's Commissar of heavy industry of the USSR Sergo Ordzhonikidze signed an order on the opening of Dzhidastroy, the construction of the Dzhidinsky tungsten-molybdenum combine was initiated. Initially, the work village was located at the site of the village Modonkul, located at the confluence of the Modonkul River and Dhzida.

In 1935, a place was chosen for the foundation of the working settlement of Dzhidastroy – between the village of Modonkul and the Incur mine, in an extensive cherry grove. Already in the autumn, a road was laid, houses, a dining room, a shop and a bathhouse were built. During the following year, barrack-type houses were built for workers. In the same year, a bridge across Dzhida river was built, heavy machinery and equipment began to be imported, and the Holston mine was launched. Molybdenum mineralization has been launched at the Pervomaisky site. The share of the local tungsten is accounted for 65% of production throughout the country.

In 1938, the village of Dzhidastroy officially received the status of an urban-type settlement. In 1939, the mining and the processing plant and the Holston mine were put into operation. In 1941, a narrow-gauge railway was built, the Pervomaisky molybdenum mine was created. Already the following year, the molybdenum processing pant began operation. The mining and processing pant was finally formed. The War began, the Tyrnyauz mining and processing plant was occupied, as the result of which the local plant becomes the main supplier of tungsten in the country.

Since February 13, 1941, the further construction of the Dzhidacombinat has been transferred to the jurisdiction of the NKVD of the USSR. Dzhidinlag is being organized, the labor force began to be replenished by prisoners.

Since March 1943, deported Germans, who has been resettled earlier, mostly women, have been mobilized for correctional labor work in Dzhidastroy. They were busy with mining and washing of the concentrate and logging.

=== Gorodok ===
In 1944, the village of Dzhidastroy received the status of a city and a new name "Gorodok". There was a theater, kindergartens, and the service industry developed. The Dzhidacombinat itself was transferred to the People's commissar of non-ferrous metallurgy of the USSR in 1945. At the same time, a large group of Japanese prisoners of war arrived there. A large number of freelance workers worked at the combine, but the number of prisoners involved in work was still greater. In 1953, Dzhidlag was liquidated, which caused a sharp reduction on the number of employees of the plant. Recruitment of the specialists in other regions was required to replenish the staff, which took a long time.

=== During the post-war period ===
In 1959, the city was renamed Zakamensk. During the 1950s, street lighting appeared, well-maintained 3-4-storey houses were built, a mining college and a consumer service plant were opened.

On April 2, 1963, Zakamensk was transformed into a city of republican subordination. Bayangol, Inkur and Holtoson villages are subordinated to the City Council[3].

On January 13, 1965, the city of Zakamensk and the village of Inkur were transferred from republican subordination to the Zakamensky district. The city of Zakamensk became the district center.

In 1967, the Palace of Culture with a hall with 600 seats was built and put into operation. In 1973, the Pervomaisky mine was closed due to the full development of the deposit. In 1974, a new bridge over the Dzhida River and the terminal building were built. In 1983, the Gornyak cinema with 400 seats appeared. In 1989, the plant was recognized as the winner in the All-Union Socialist Competition with entry on the All-Union Honor Board of the VDNH of the USSR. In 1990, the school No. 5 was built for 1,500 students.

=== Post-Soviet times ===
On October 27, 1992, the plant was transformed into the JSC "Dzhidinsky Combine". Due to the conversion of the military industry, the volume of production is reduced by 70%.

In 1995, the production of tungsten in comparison to 1989 decreased 4 times. The State Reserve Committee sells 13,500 tons of tungsten at dumping prices, next year Kazakhstan also sells 10,000 tons of tungsten. Prices on the world market decreased by a third, sales decreased 2.2 times. As a result, the costs of production is 1.5 times higher than the cost price . Thus, the rash actions of the government in the absence of state support put the company in a hopeless situation.

On February 26, 1998, the Dzhida tungsten-molybdenum Combine ceased to exist.

In 2006, Zakamensk LLC began work on the extraction of placer tungsten at the Inkurskoye field. Later, having received licenses for the development of tailings dumps, it ordered the development of a technology for extracting metal from stale sands. In 2008, an enterprise for the processing of waste from the work of the Dzhidinsky VMK, which extracts tungsten with associated gold and silver, was put into operation. Later, in 2010, the company "Tverdosplav" won a tender for the use of mineral resources in the area of the Holtoson and Inkur deposits, planning to build a new mining and processing plant in the coming years.

In May 2014, the universal sports complex "Tamir" was opened.

On May 5, 2015, the city of Zakamensk received the title "City of Labor Valor and Glory". On May 7 of the same year, in a solemn atmosphere in Victory Square, a T-62K tank "General Tank" was installed on a pedestal in honor of the veterans of the workers of the rear of the Dzhida tungsten-molybdenum Combine.

== Geography ==
=== Location ===
The city is located in the south-west of Buryatia near the state border with Mongolia, 404 km from Ulan-Ude, in the central part of the Dzhida ridge. It is located in the mountainous taiga area of the Modon-Kul River valley— the right tributary of the Dzhida River. The height of the bottom of the mountain valley is about 1100 m above sea level, medium-high mountains with absolute marks of 1300–1400 m are adjacent to the city.

=== Ecology ===
The city is located in the mountainous taiga zone, remote from other industrial centers, in the valley of a small watercourse originating in Mongolia. Nevertheless, the ecological situation in most of the city and its surroundings is extremely unfavorable. From an ecological point of view, the territory of Zakamensk and the former Dzhida tungsten-molybdenum Combine is the most disadvantaged part of the Baikal natural territory.

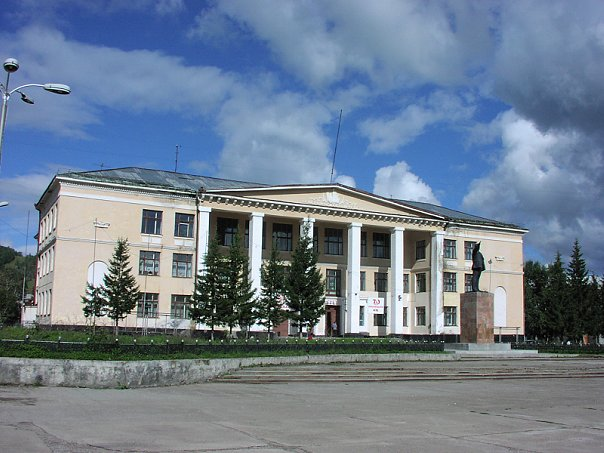
Zakamensk- Center

=== Environmental issues ===
The Dzhidinsky combine is a pollutant of all components of the natural environment. The ores that were developed by the tungsten-molybdenum combine contain chemical elements belonging to various hazard classes: cadmium, lead, zinc, fluorine; molybdenum, calcium; beryllium, tungsten, bismuth, rubidium, caesium; rocks with high sulfide contents were developed to Class I; to class II; beryllium, tungsten, bismuth, caesium; in addition, rocks with high sulfide contents were developed. When enriching tungsten-molybdenum ore by flotation, toxic reagents were used — kerosene, sulfuric acid, xanthogenate, pine oil, liquid glass, etc., which also accumulated in tailings. In total, 44.5 million tons of waste were generated during the operation of the Dzhida tungsten-molybdenum Combine. Partially man-made waste was used for filling roads, city sites, building houses. In the process of wind dispersal, transfer and erosion by surface and groundwater, soils, vegetation, air, underground and surface waters were contaminated with toxic compounds.

The main sources of pollution are man-made sands of tailings of waste from the processing plants of the closed Dzhidacombinat, and mine, tunnel, quarry, sub-basement waters of the streams Gujirka, Inkur and the "Zapadnaya" tunnels, containing water-soluble forms of ore elements, and polluting through surface and underground runoff of the soil in the city and the waters of the Modonkul and Myrgensheno rivers. Mine waters and tailings are characterized by the greatest pollution. In mine waters, the excess of MPC of some elements (Cd, Pb, Zn, F, Cu, W, Mn, etc.) from hazard class I—III near pollution sources reaches tens and hundreds of times, in the tailings, the content of heavy metals reaches 100 or more MPC, according to the indicators of total geochemical pollution, the condition of the soils of the suburbs and the city itself is assessed as dangerous, in some places as extremely dangerous.

The area of the ecologically unfavorable territory is 867 hectares, including 487 hectares in Zakamensk (68.53% of the city's territory), 380 hectares - mining workings and overburden dumps.

On the territory of the city itself, according to the total indicator of chemical element pollution (Cu, Zn, As, Pb, Mo, W, Cd, Sb), there are: - an ecological disaster zone with an area of 281.3 hectares (39% of the city's territory) — an environmental emergency zone with an area of 205.8 hectares (29% of the city's territory)

The situation is aggravated by the extremely unfortunate location of the first tailings dump, closed in 1958 — on a hill, on the outskirts of the city. As a result, during rains, heavy metals migrate with stormwater and groundwater through densely populated areas of the city, infecting the right bank of the city with streams of dispersion of water-soluble metal compounds. Also, with strong winds, dust storms are not uncommon, which have formed a tail of scattering of man-made sands along the foot of the mountain with a length of 15 km.

As a result, the Modonkul River is one of the most polluted water bodies in the Baikal region.

=== Measures to eliminate sources of environmental problems ===
The working version of the project "Elimination of the negative impacts of technogenic tailings of the Dzhidinsky tungsten-molybdenum Combine in the Zakamensky district of the Republic of Buryatia" (the first stage) was developed back in 2007 by order of the State Committee for Nature of the Republic[24]. In 2010, the issue of liquidation of the tailings dump was submitted by the authorities of the republic as a proposal to the Federal Target Program "Protection of Lake Baikal and socio-economic development of the Baikal Natural Territory". The federal authorities have planned to allocate 4 billion rubles for project activities until 2020. This project will be a pilot for the federal target program for the elimination of accumulated environmental damage.

Within the framework of the republican program "Environmental safety in the Republic of Buryatia for 2009-2011 and for the period up to 2017", with the involvement of federal and regional funding sources, the implementation of the first stage of the project "Elimination of environmental consequences of the activities of the Dzhida Tungsten-Molybdenum Combine" was launched. The tender for the execution of works on this project was won by CJSC Zakamensk, during its execution, the rocks of the Dzhida tailings dump with a volume of 3.2 million tons covering an area of 452 hectares were moved to the dump in the Barun-Naryn Padi for the purpose of their further processing at the processing plant of CJSC Zakamensk".

The contractor under the state contract for the "second stage of measures to eliminate the environmental consequences of the activities of the Dzhidinsky tungsten-molybdenum Combine in the Zakamensky district of the Republic of Buryatia" in 2011 became LLC Gidrospetsstroy. The project of the second stage of work did not include a program for medical and social rehabilitation of the population, which led to a heated public discussion. As a result, the government of Buryatia promised to allocate funds for medical research to assess the health status of the population of Zakamensk. This work will be coordinated by the Buryat branch of the FBGU SB RAMS "Scientific Center for Health, Family and Human Reproduction".

In the course of the second stage of work, the removal of man-made waste from the Dzhida tailings dump will continue, the construction of several complexes of treatment facilities near the city and mines for the treatment of stormwater, mine and basement waters, anti-erosion measures, demolition of abandoned buildings and structures of the combine, biological reclamation on an area of 613.8 hectares, including in the city, systematic monitoring of the environmental situation will be conducted.

In 2016, the first results of complex medical, sociological and biogeochemical studies conducted by scientific specialists of the Federal Scientific Center for Medical and Preventive Technologies for Public Health Risk Management of Rospotrebnadzor were published. In the course of scientific research, a hygienic assessment of the quality of environmental objects (atmospheric air, soil, drinking water, food products) was carried out, the health status of children and adults in the city of Zakamensk and the village of Mikhailovka was assessed, statistical data and scientific publications were analyzed.

Studies of drinking water sources revealed excess of Fe, Ni, Cd and Pb standards in samples from wells. The water in the centralized water supply system meets the hygienic requirements, in private wells the excess of the maximum permissible concentration of Fe was recorded. The soils, according to their data, are intensively polluted, but no anomalies were detected when analyzing samples of local fruit and vegetable, dairy and meat products. Monitoring of atmospheric air dustiness revealed irregular dusting of the air environment, heavy metal contents not exceeding the maximum permissible concentrations were recorded in part of the samples. It is stated that there are risks of developing oncological diseases in the local population. As a result, scientists have confirmed the existence of environmental problems, but do not characterize the current situation as an environmental disaster or ecological catastrophe.

== Administrative and municipal status ==
Within the framework of administrative divisions, Zakamensk serves as the administrative center of Zakamensky District. As an administrative division, it is incorporated within Zakamensky District as the Town of Zakamensk. As a municipal division, the Town of Zakamensk and Kholtosonsky Selsoviet are incorporated within Zakamensky Municipal District as Zakamensk Urban Settlement.

=== History of the municipal divisions ===
Kholtosonsky Selsoviet used to be municipally incorporated as Kholtosonskoye Rural Settlement, but the latter was merged into Zakamensk Urban Settlement on July 18, 2015.

== Economy and transportation ==
The town's economy relies mainly on the mining and processing of metal ores, which are then mainly transported to smelters in the Ural Mountains. There is road from Zakamensk to Dzhida railway station, 253 kilometers (157 mi) to the east on the Trans-Mongolian Railway.
