= Petropavlovka, Dzhidinsky District, Republic of Buryatia =

Petropavlovka Петропавловка
- Selo
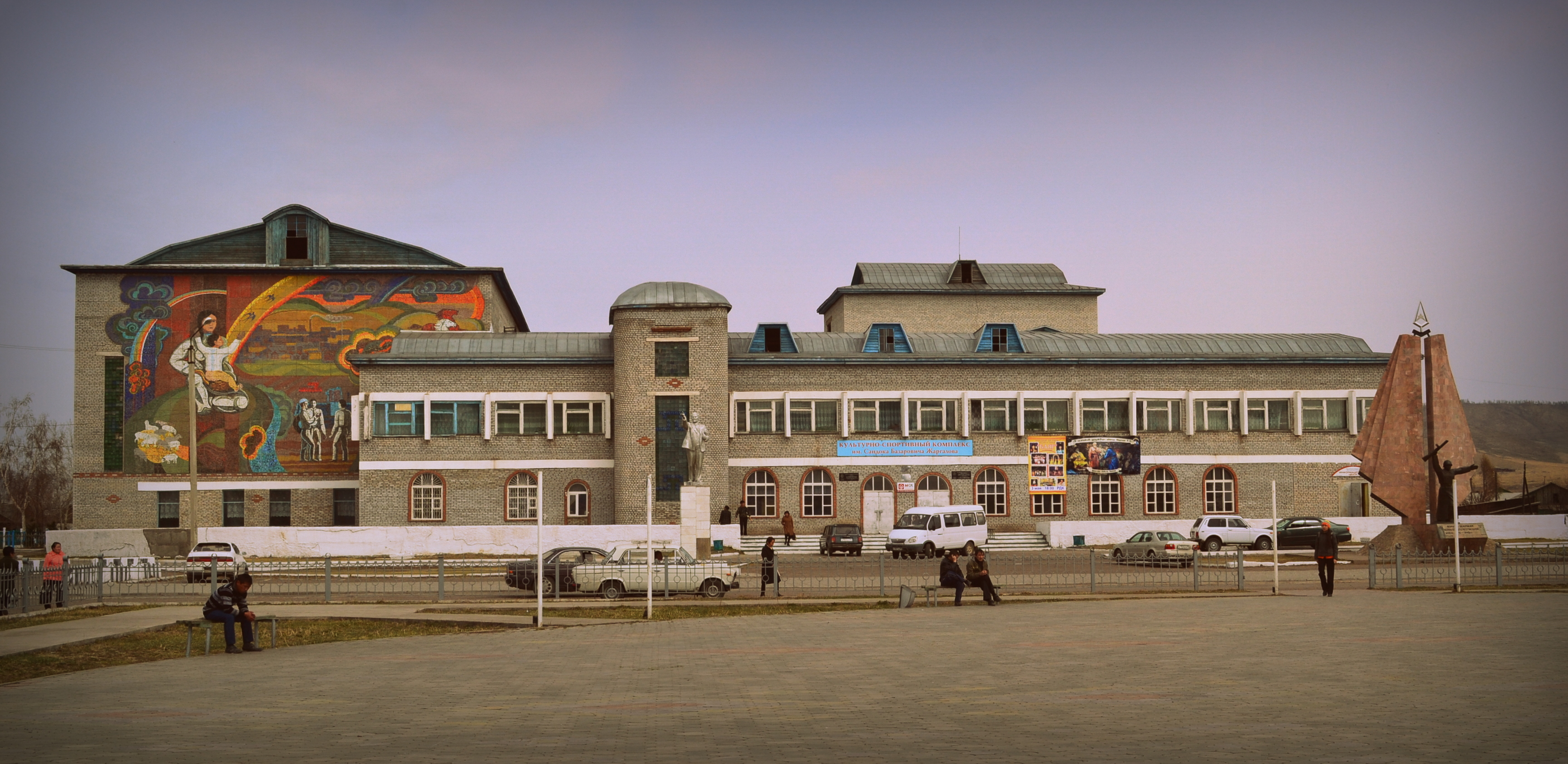
- House of Culture in Petropavlovka
- Interactive map of Petropavlovka
- Location of Petropavlovka Petropavlovka (Republic of Buryatia)
- Coordinates: 50°36′46″N 105°19′27″E
- Country: Russia
- Federal subject: Buryatia
- Administrative district: Dzhidinsky District
- SelsovietSelsoviet: Petropavlovsky

Population (2010 Census)
  - Total: 7,451
  - Estimate (2024): 7,264 (−2.5%)

Administrative status
  - Capital of: Dzhidinsky District, Petropavlovsky Selsoviet

Municipal status
  - Municipal district: Dzhidinsky Municipal District
  - Rural settlement: Petropavlovskoye Rural Settlement
  - Capital of: Dzhidinsky Municipal District, Petropavlovskoye Rural Settlement
- Time zone: UTC+8 (MSK+5)
- Postal code: 671920
- OKTMO ID: 81612475101

Petropavlovka (Russian: Петропавловка, Buryat and Mongolian: Шивээ, Shivee) is a rural locality (a selo) and the administrative center of Dzhidinsky District of the Republic of Buryatia, Russia. Population: 7,451 (2010 census); 7,723 (2002 census); 8,038 (1989 Soviet census).
