= Dzhidinsky District =

Dzhidinsky District Джидинский район (Russian)
- District

Other transcription(s)
  - Buryat: Зэдын аймаг
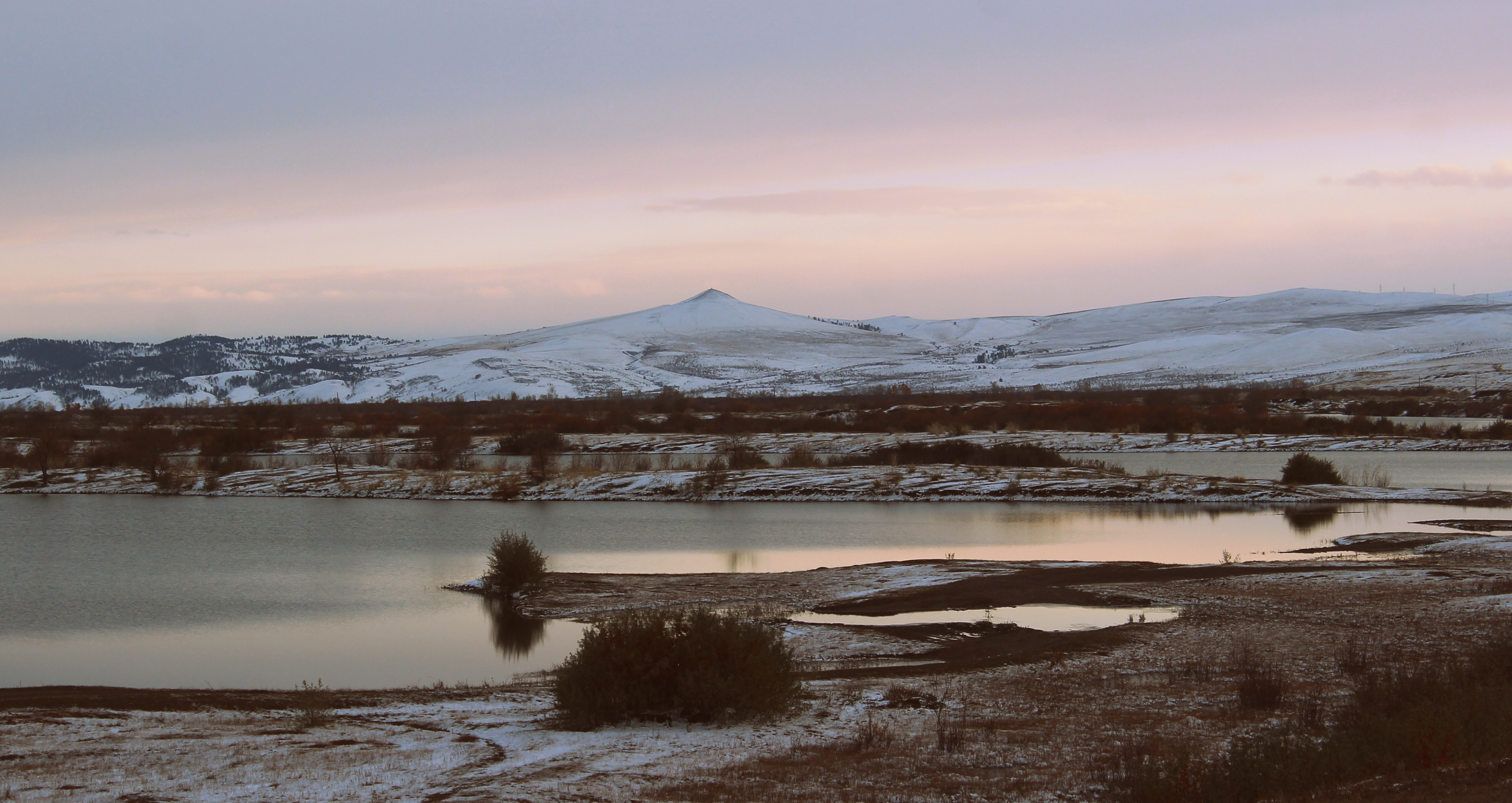
- Mount Kharaty, a natural monument, as seen from the selo of Dzhida

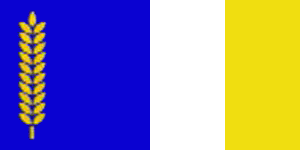
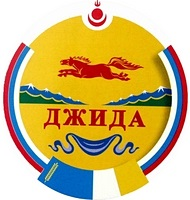
- Flag Coat of arms
- Location of Dzhidinsky District in the Republic of Buryatia
- Coordinates: 50°36′N 105°19′E
- Country: Russia
- Federal subject: Republic of Buryatia
- Established: 1935
- Administrative center: Petropavlovka

Area
  - Total: 8,600 km^{2} (3,300 sq mi)

Population (2010 Census)
  - Total: 29,352
  - Density: 3.4/km^{2} (8.8/sq mi)
  - Urban: 18.4%
  - Rural: 81.6%

Administrative structure
  - Administrative divisions: 15 Selsoviets, 8 Somons
  - Inhabited localities: 38 rural localities

Municipal structure
  - Municipally incorporated as: Dzhidinsky Municipal District
  - Municipal divisions: 0 urban settlements, 22 rural settlements
- Time zone: UTC+8 (MSK+5)
- OKTMO ID: 81612000
- Website: http://admdzd.sdep.ru

Population of Dzhidinsky District
- 2010 Census: 29,352
- 2002 Census: 32,449
- 1989 Census: 35,390
- 1979 Census: 34,212

Dzhidinsky District (Russian: Джиди́нский райо́н; Buryat: Зэдын аймаг, Zedyn aimag) is an administrative and municipal district (raion), one of the twenty-one in the Republic of Buryatia, Russia. It is located in the south of the republic. The area of the district is 8,600 square kilometers (3,300 sq mi). Its administrative center is the rural locality (a selo) of Petropavlovka. As of the 2010 Census, the total population of the district was 29,352, with the population of Petropavlovka accounting for 25.4% of that number.

== Administrative and municipal status ==
Within the framework of administrative divisions, Dzhidinsky District is one of the twenty-one in the Republic of Buryatia. The district is divided into fifteen selsoviets and eight somons, which comprise thirty-eight rural localities. As a municipal division, the district is incorporated as Dzhidinsky Municipal District. Its fifteen selsoviets and eight somons are incorporated as twenty-two rural settlements within the municipal district. The selo of Petropavlovka serves as the administrative center of both the administrative and municipal district.
