= Buryatia constituency =

Russian legislative constituency

Buryatia single-member constituency
- Constituency of the Russian State Duma

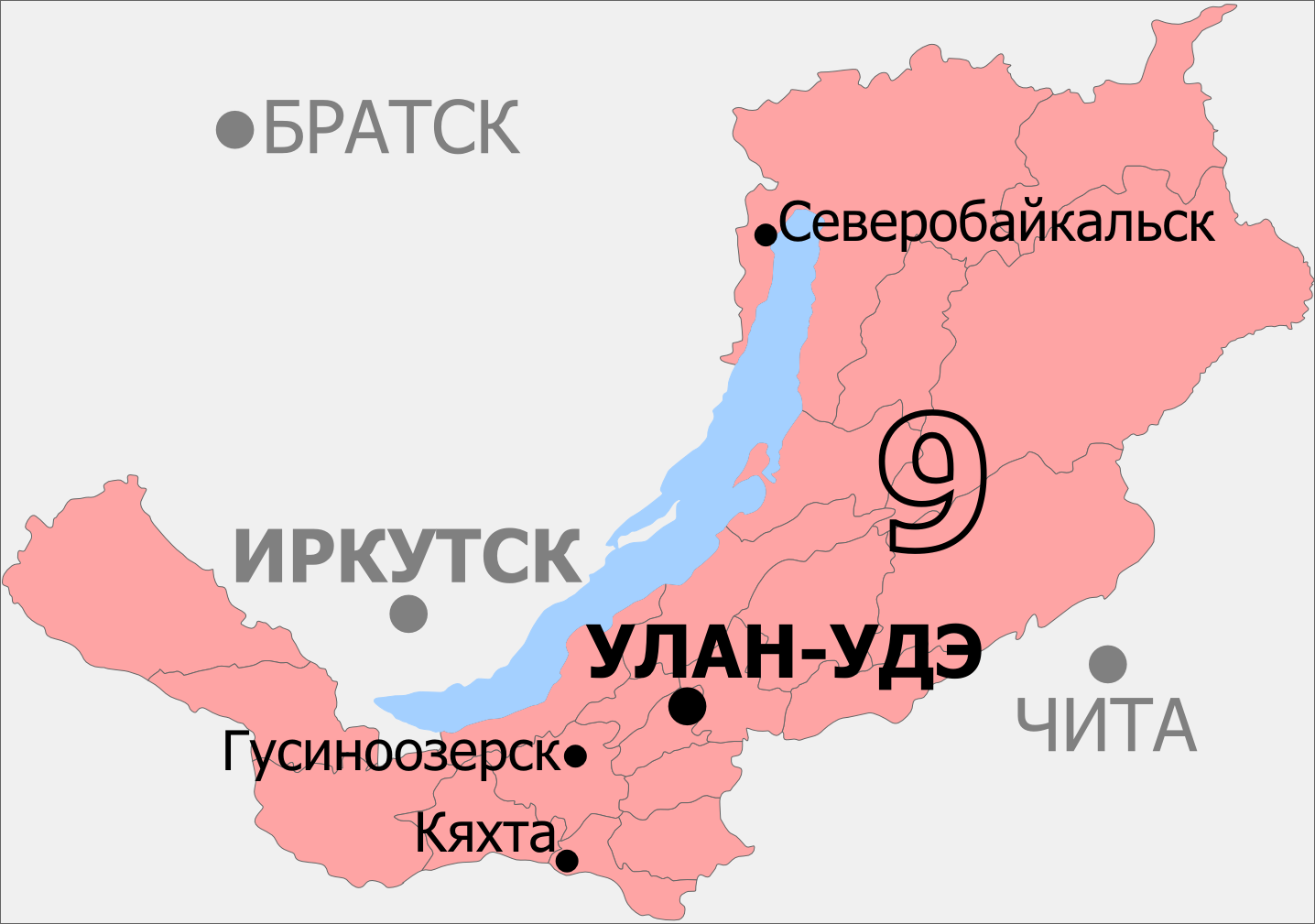
- Deputy: Dashibal Munkozhargalov; United Russia
- Federal subject: Republic of Buryatia
- Districts: Barguzinsky, Bauntovsky, Bichursky, Dzhidinsky, Ivolginsky, Kabansky, Khorinsky, Kizhinginsky, Kurumkansky, Kyakhtinsky, Muysky, Mukhorshibirsky, Okinsky, Pribaykalsky, Selenginsky, Severo-Baykalsky, Severobaykalsk, Tarbagataysky, Tunkinsky, Ulan-Ude, Yeravninsky, Zaigrayevsky, Zakamensky
- Voters: 675,676 (2026)

The Buryatia Constituency (No.9 (Note: No.8 in 1993-1995)) is a Russian legislative constituency in the Republic of Buryatia. The constituency encompasses the entire territory of Buryatia.

The constituency has been represented since 2026 by United Russia deputy Dashibal Munkozhargalov, retired Russian Army podpolkovnik and Hero of Russia, who won the open seat after defeating one-term United Russia incumbent Vyacheslav Damdintsurunov in the primary.

== Boundaries ==
1993–2007, 2016–present: Barguzinsky District, Bauntovsky District, Bichursky District, Dzhidinsky District, Ivolginsky District, Kabansky District, Khorinsky District, Kizhinginsky District, Kurumkansky District, Kyakhtinsky District, Muysky District, Mukhorshibirsky District, Okinsky District, Pribaykalsky District, Selenginsky District, Severo-Baykalsky District, Severobaykalsk, Tarbagataysky District, Tunkinsky District, Ulan-Ude, Yeravninsky District, Zaigrayevsky District, Zakamensky District
The constituency has been covering the entirety of the Republic of Buryatia since its initial creation in 1993.

== Members elected ==
Election	Member	Party
1993	Nikolay Kondakov	Independent
1995	Svetlana Naychukova	Independent
1999	Bato Semenov	Fatherland – All Russia
2003	Vasily Kuznetsov	United Russia
2007	Proportional representation - no election by constituency	
2011	Proportional representation - no election by constituency	
2016	Aldar Damdinov	United Russia
2021	Vyacheslav Damdintsurunov	United Russia
2026	Dashibal Munkozhargalov	United Russia

== Election results ==
=== 1993 ===
==== Declared candidates ====
- Kapiton Budayev (Independent), Deputy Prosecutor of Buryatia (1987–present)
- Yevgeny Kislov (YaBL), geologist, ecological activist
- Nikolay Kondakov (Independent), Member of Supreme Council of Buryatia (1990–present), construction executive
- Raisa Pshenichnikova (Choice of Russia), prorector of East Siberian State Institute of Culture
- Mikhail Semyonov (Independent), Deputy Premier of Buryatia (1988–present), former Member of Supreme Soviet of the Soviet Union (1985–1989)

==== Results ====
Summary of the 12 December 1993 Russian legislative election in the Buryatia constituency
Candidate	Party	Votes	%
Nikolay Kondakov	Independent	76,609	20.79%
Raisa Pshenichnikova	Choice of Russia	70,736	19.20%
Mikhail Semyonov	Independent	52,467	14.24%
Kapiton Budayev	Independent	45,522	12.35%
Yevgeny Kislov	Yavlinsky–Boldyrev–Lukin	44,429	12.06%
against all		47,562	12.91%
Total		368,512	100%

=== 1995 ===
==== Declared candidates ====
- Vladimir Belousov (NDR), Member of People's Khural of the Republic of Buryatia (1994–present), Mayor of Zagorsk, Ulan-Ude
- Nimazhap Ilyukhinov (Independent), Buddhist society leader
- Nikolay Kondakov (CPRF), incumbent Member of State Duma (1994–present)
- Vladimir Markov (Independent), Member of People's Khural of the Republic of Buryatia (1994–present)
- Svetlana Naychukova (Independent), Member of People's Khural of the Republic of Buryatia (1994–present), poultry farm director
- Vladimir Prokopyev (Independent), postgraduate student
- Tsyrzhima Sergeyeva (Independent), State Committee of Russia on Higher Education staffer
- Arnold Tulokhonov (Independent), director of the Baikal Institute of Natural Resources (1991–present)
- Bayar Tumurov (PLP), corporate executive

==== Results ====
Summary of the 17 December 1995 Russian legislative election in the Buryatia constituency
Candidate	Party	Votes	%
Svetlana Naychukova	Independent	93,912	21.76%
Nikolay Kondakov (incumbent)	Communist Party	80,260	18.60%
Vladimir Belousov	Our Home – Russia	56,898	13.19%
Nimazhap Ilyukhinov	Independent	35,714	8.28%
Arnold Tulokhonov	Independent	32,745	7.59%
Vladimir Markov	Independent	22,007	5.10%
Tsyrzhima Sergeyeva	Independent	19,800	4.59%
Vladimir Prokopyev	Independent	12,001	2.78%
Bayar Tumurov	Beer Lovers Party	7,614	1.76%
against all		58,328	13.52%
Total		431,525	100%

=== 1999 ===
==== Declared candidates ====
- Sergey Budazhapov (CPRF), Member of State Duma (1996–present)
- Viktor Izmaylov (Independent), Deputy Chairman of the People's Khural of the Republic of Buryatia (1998–present)
- Oleg Khomutov (Independent), former Member of Supreme Council of Buryatia (1990–1994)
- Vladimir Markov (DN), former Member of People's Khural of the Republic of Buryatia (1994–1998), environmental prosecutor, 1995 candidate for this seat
- Svetlana Naychukova (Independent), incumbent Member of State Duma (1996–present)
- Yevgeny Paltsev (Independent), First Deputy Chairman of the Buryatia State Committee on State Property Management
- Igor Pronkinov (Independent), chairman of the Our Home – Russia regional executive committee, former chairman of the Buryat-Mongolian People's Party
- Bato Semenov (OVR), Member of People's Khural of the Republic of Buryatia (1994–1996, 1998–present)
- Tsyrzhima Sergeyeva (Independent), pharmaceutical consultant, 1995 candidate for this seat
- Svetlana Zangeyeva (Independent), industrial consultant

==== Failed to qualify ====
- Andrey Gromov (LDPR), nonprofit executive
- Konstantin Mitupov (Yabloko), Buryat State University department of Russian history dean

==== Did not file ====
- Valery Bartukov (Independent)
- Nikolay Krasikov (Independent)
- Aleksey Mamontov (ROS), attorney
- Oleg Pakulov (Lavanda Vishnevskaya) (Independent), drag queen

==== Results ====
Summary of the 19 December 1999 Russian legislative election in the Buryatia constituency
Candidate	Party	Votes	%
Bato Semenov	Fatherland – All Russia	136,960	34.99%
Viktor Izmaylov	Independent	78,421	20.03%
Sergey Budazhapov	Communist Party	54,298	13.87%
Svetlana Naychukova (incumbent)	Independent	21,959	5.61%
Vladimir Markov	Spiritual Heritage	20,888	5.34%
Yevgeny Paltsev	Independent	13,332	3.41%
Svetlana Zangeyeva	Independent	6,139	1.57%
Oleg Khomutov	Independent	5,965	1.52%
Igor Pronkinov	Independent	5,624	1.44%
Tsyrzhima Sergeyeva	Independent	5,327	1.36%
against all		32,640	8.34%
Total		391,466	100%

=== 2003 ===
==== Declared candidates ====
- Innokenty Beloborodov (PVR-RPZh), retired Internal Troops lieutenant general
- Aleksandr Budayev (Independent), former Pandito Khambo Lama (1993–1995)
- Aleksandr Kardash (LDPR), former Member of People's Khural of the Republic of Buryatia (1994–2002)
- Nikolay Kondakov (Independent), former Member of State Duma (1994–1995)
- Vasily Kuznetsov (United Russia), Member of State Duma (2000–present)
- Bair Tsyrenov (Independent), aide to Senator Vladimir Agalov
- Andrey Yakunin (Independent), forestry executive

==== Failed to qualify ====
- Bato Semenov (Independent), incumbent Member of State Duma (2000–present), 2002 presidential candidate
- Yury Skuratov (CPRF), former Prosecutor General of Russia (1995–2000), 2000 presidential candidate
- Aleksandr Turchaninov-Rodin (DPR), retired theatre actor

==== Results ====
Summary of the 7 December 2003 Russian legislative election in the Buryatia constituency
Candidate	Party	Votes	%
Vasily Kuznetsov	United Russia	107,794	30.26%
Innokenty Beloborodov	Party of Russia's Rebirth-Russian Party of Life	106,571	29.92%
Aleksandr Budayev	Independent	38,814	10.90%
Nikolay Kondakov	Independent	24,552	6.89%
Bair Tsyrenov	Independent	18,380	5.16%
Aleksandr Kardash	Liberal Democratic Party	11,927	3.35%
Andrey Yakunin	Independent	3,746	1.05%
against all		33,197	9.32%
Total		356,654	100%

=== 2016 ===
==== Declared candidates ====
- Oksana Bukholtseva (A Just Russia), Member of People's Khural of the Republic of Buryatia (2013–present), middle school principal
- Aldar Damdinov (United Russia), Minister of Education and Science of Buryatia (2008–present)
- Sergey Dorosh (LDPR), businessman
- Mikhail Slipenchuk (Party of Growth), Member of State Duma (2011–present)
- Bayar Tsydenov (GP), Member of People's Khural of the Republic of Buryatia (2013–present), Buddhist lama
- Bair Tsyrenov (CPRF), Member of People's Khural of the Republic of Buryatia (2013–present), aide to State Duma member Dmitry Novikov

==== Withdrawn candidates ====
- Mikhail Kosarev (CPCR), homemaker

==== Failed to qualify ====
- Dmitry Kolmakov (Union of Labor), republican federation of unions chairman

==== Declined ====
- Bair Baldanov (United Russia), Head of Okinsky District (2011–present) (lost the primary)
- Nikolai Buduyev (United Russia), Member of Ulan-Ude City Council of Deputies (2014–present), journalist (lost the primary, ran on the party list)
- Bair Dorzhiyev (United Russia), Member of People's Khural of the Republic of Buryatia (2007–present), marketing executive (lost the primary, ran on the party list)
- Irinchey Matkhanov (A Just Russia), Member of State Duma (2013–present)
- Yury Tarmayev (CPRF), Member of State Duma (2015–present) (lost the selection)
- Anna Skosyrskaya (United Russia), former Member of People's Khural of the Republic of Buryatia (2007–2013), community activist (lost the primary)
- Bair Tsyrenov (United Russia), Member of People's Khural of the Republic of Buryatia (2013–present), corporate executive, 2003 candidate for this seat (lost the primary, ran on the party list)
- Igor Zubarev (United Russia), Member of People's Khural of the Republic of Buryatia (2013–present), energy executive (lost the primary)

==== Results ====
Summary of the 18 September 2016 Russian legislative election in the Buryatia constituency
Candidate	Party	Votes	%
Aldar Damdinov	United Russia	108,128	37.56%
Mikhail Slipenchuk	Party of Growth	65,482	22.75%
Bair Tsyrenov	Communist Party	46,230	16.06%
Oksana Bukholtseva	A Just Russia	31,716	11.02%
Sergey Dorosh	Liberal Democratic Party	14,190	4.93%
Bayar Tsydenov	Civic Platform	9,077	3.15%
Total		287,879	100%

=== 2021 ===
==== Declared candidates ====
- Igor Bobkov (RPPSS), Member of People's Khural of the Republic of Buryatia (2002–2013, 2018–present), former gas executive
- Damdin Bolotov (CPCR), project manager
- Oksana Bukholtseva (A Just Russia), Member of People's Khural of the Republic of Buryatia (2013–present), 2016 candidate for this seat
- Maksim Buvalin (New People), energy executive
- Vyacheslav Damdintsurunov (United Russia), Minister of Sport and Youth Policy of Buryatia (2017–present)
- Sergey Dorosh (LDPR), Member of People's Khural of the Republic of Buryatia (2018–present), 2016 candidate for this seat, 2017 head candidate
- Yevgeny Menshikov (RPSS), former chairman of the Right Cause party regional office (2006–2016)
- Bayar Tsydenov (GP), former Member of People's Khural of the Republic of Buryatia (2013–2018), Buddhist lama, 2016 candidate for this seat
- Bair Tsyrenov (CPRF), Member of People's Khural of the Republic of Buryatia (2013–present), 2016 candidate for this seat
- Sergey Zverev (The Greens), hairstylist, fashion designer

==== Declined ====
- Aldar Damdinov (United Russia), incumbent Member of State Duma (2016–present)
- Vyacheslav Markhayev (CPRF), former Senator from Irkutsk Oblast (2015–2020), former Member of State Duma (2011–2015), 2017 head candidate

==== Results ====
Summary of the 17-19 September 2021 Russian legislative election in the Buryatia constituency
Candidate	Party	Votes	%
Vyacheslav Damdintsurunov	United Russia	115,716	37.41%
Bair Tsyrenov	Communist Party	61,429	19.86%
Sergey Zverev	The Greens	23,081	7.46%
Igor Bobkov	Party of Pensioners	22,692	7.34%
Maksim Buvalin	New People	19,628	6.35%
Oksana Bukholtseva	A Just Russia — For Truth	17,338	5.61%
Bayar Tsydenov	Civic Platform	15,565	5.03%
Damdin Bolotov	Communists of Russia	13,060	4.22%
Sergey Dorosh	Liberal Democratic Party	7,234	2.34%
Yevgeny Menshikov	Russian Party of Freedom and Justice	3,278	1.06%
Total		309,304	100%

=== 2026 ===
==== Declared candidates ====
- Vyacheslav Chernigovsky (LDPR), deputy coordinator of the party regional office
- Shirap Khaludorov (New People), aide to State Duma member
- Yevgeny Kislov (The Greens), geology leading researcher
- Vladimir Manzhuyev (A Just Russia), entrepreneur
- Dashibal Munkozhargalov (United Russia), Russian Army podpolkovnik, Hero of Russia (2023)
- Bair Tsyrenov (CPRF), Member of People's Khural of the Republic of Buryatia (2013–present), 2016 and 2021 candidate for this seat

==== Declined ====
- Nikolai Buduyev (United Russia), Member of State Duma (2016–present) (lost the primary)
- Vyacheslav Damdintsurunov (United Russia), incumbent Member of State Duma (2021–present) (lost the primary, running on the party list)
- Yelena Perova (United Russia), rector of East Siberian State Institute of Culture (2019–present) (lost the primary, running on the party list)

==== Results ====
Summary of the 18-20 September 2026 Russian legislative election in the Buryatia constituency
Candidate	Party	Votes	%
Dashibal Munkozhargalov	United Russia	169,234	50.53%
Bair Tsyrenov	Communist Party	87,490	26.12%
Vyacheslav Chernigovsky	Liberal Democratic Party	23,821	7.11%
Yevgeny Kislov	The Greens	17,820	5.32%
Shirap Khaludorov	New People	14,475	4.32%
Vladimir Manzhuyev	A Just Russia	12,485	3.73%
Total		334,944	100%
