= List of chairmen of the People's Khural of the Republic of Buryatia =

List of chairmen of the People's Khural of Buryatia.

This is a list of chairmen (speakers) of the Supreme Council 1990–1994:

Name	Term
Sergey Buldayev	April 19, 1990–October 21, 1991
Leonid Potapov	October 21, 1991–July 1, 1994

This is a list of chairmen (speakers) of the People's Khural of Buryatia

Name	Term
Mikhail Semyonov	July 21, 1994–July 5, 1998; July 20, 1998–June 23, 2002
Alexander Lubsanov	July 22, 2002–December 2, 2007
Matvey Gershevich	December 11, 2007–September 8, 2013; September 17, 2013–April 23, 2015
Tsyrenov-Dashi Dorzhiev	August 28, 2015–September 19, 2018
Vladimir Pavlov	September 19, 2018–Incumbent
