= Buryat State Agricultural Academy =

Agricultural school in Ulan-Ude, Buryatia, Russia

Buryat State Agricultural Academy Named After V.R. Filippov
- Бурятская государственная сельскохозяйственная академия имени В.Р. Филиппова
- Other names: Buryat GCXA (ГСХА), Educational Institution of Higher Professional Education "Buryat State Agriculture Academy Named After V.R. Filippov"; FSBEI НРE Buryat SAA
- Former names: Agro-Pedagogical Institute, Buryat-Mongolian State Veterinary Institute (Since 1935), Buryat Agricultural Institute (since 1961)
- Motto: Знания для нашего будущего
- Motto in English: Knowledge for our future
- Established: 1931 (closed temporarily from 1941 to 1944)
- Rector: Galsan Evgenievich Dareev (since 2019)
- Students: 9015
- Location: D. 8, Pushkin Ul., Ulan-Ude, Buryatia, 670024, Russia; 51.5042°N 107.3528°E
- Language: Russian
- Website: http://www.bgsha.ru/
- Building details
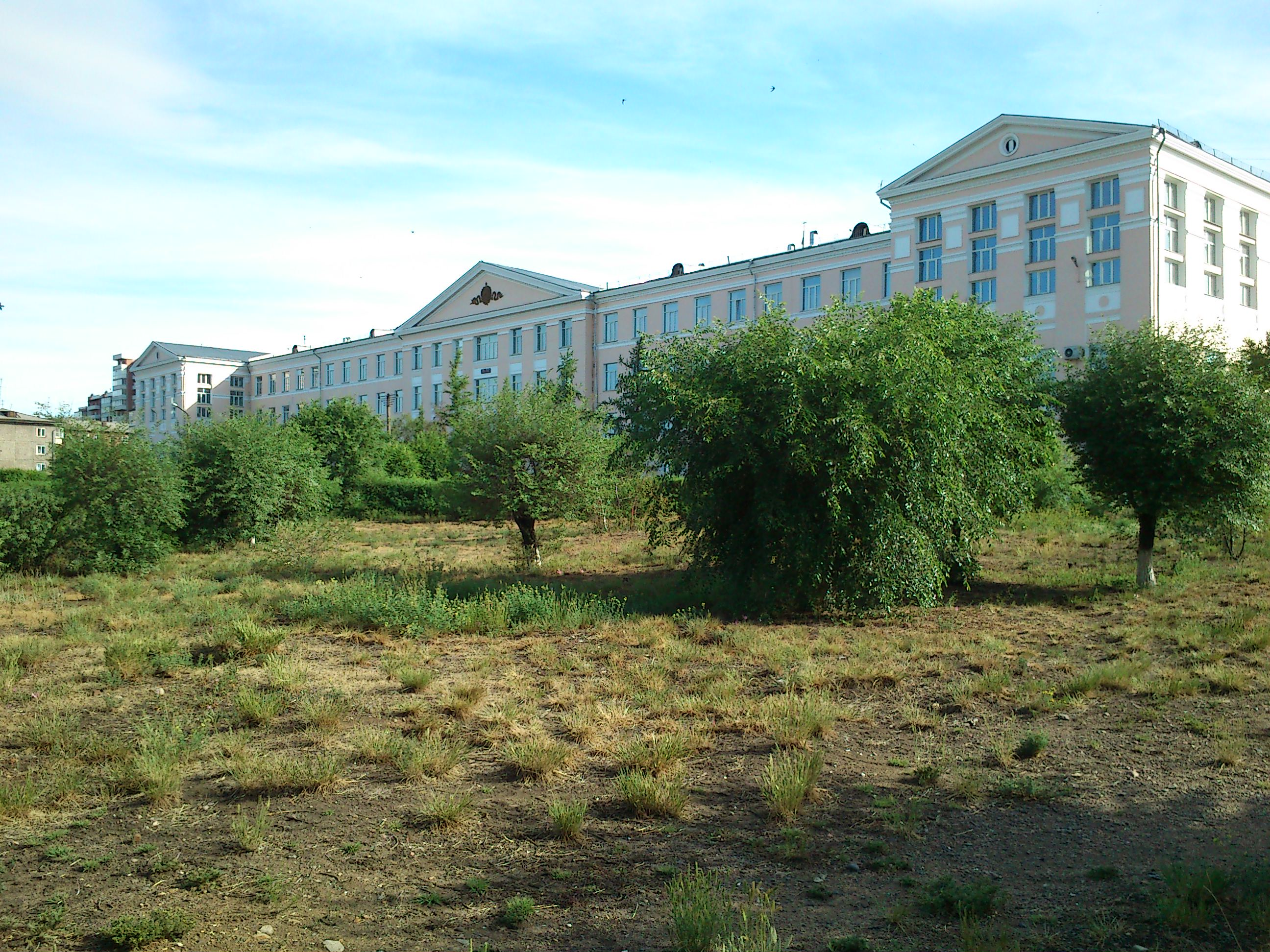
- University building

The Buryat State Agricultural Academy Named After V.R. Filippov, known commonly as the Buryat State Agricultural Academy, is a federal state budgetary educational institution of higher education in Siberia and the Russian Far East. The academy is specialized in agricultural studies, veterinary studies, and technological studies.

== History ==
The Buryat State Agricultural Academy was created in accordance with the Resolution of the Board of the People's Commissariat of Agriculture of the USSR of August 13, 1931 No. 38 as the Buryat-Mongolian Agropedagogical Institute. In 1935, the Agropedagogical Institute became known as the Buryat-Mongolian State Veterinary Institute. From December 1941 to 1944, the Institute was closed as many professors and students went to fight in World War II.

In 1961, the Buryat-Mongolian State Veterinary Institute was renamed the Buryat Agricultural Institute. From 1957 to 1962, the main building of the Institute was built (its chief project architect being Giprovuz S. Mikhailov, a project of his since 1955).

In April 1995, after going through a state certification, the Buryat Agricultural Institute was renamed the Buryat State Agricultural Academy, a name it has held (colloquially) since then. On March 4, 1998, per Decree of the Government of the Republic of Buryatia No. 79, the Buryat State Agricultural Academy was named after Vasily Rodionovich Filippov, former rector of the academy.

By order of the Ministry of Agriculture of the Russian Federation dated May 23, 2011 No. 132 "On renaming FSEI HPE and their branches", the academy was renamed into the Federal State Budgetary Educational Institution of Higher Professional Education “Buryat State Agricultural Academy named after V. R. Filippov”.

== Structure ==
The Buryat State Agricultural Academy includes five faculties - the Agribusiness and Intercultural Communications Faculty, the Agronomic Faculty, the Veterinary Faculty, the Engineering Faculty, and the Technological Faculty. There are two institutes - the Institute of Further Education and the Institute of Land Management, Cadastres and Land Reclamation. There is also an Agrotechnical college, units of educational-scientific-industrial, scientific-research and industrial-economic facilities. There are also facilities for cultural, educational, recreational and therapeutic uses. The academy also has a campus in Aginskoye. Other structural units are the Center of Landscape Gardening and Design, the Veterinary Clinic, the Center of Career Guidance, the Testing Laboratory Center, the Logistics Center, the Educational and Scientific Center of Innovations and the Laboratory of Solar, Hydro and Wind energy.

Since January 2019, the academy has had a newspaper named Vestnik Akademii.

== Famous alumni ==
- Tsyren-Dashi Erdineevich Dorzhiev
- Vladimir Anatolyevich Pavlov
- Gunsyn Tsydenova

== Rectors ==
1. Moroz Petrovich Khabaev
2. Kalp Khalbaevich Shantanov
3. Mikhail Vasilyevich Shirokovsky
4. Gavriil Nikitich Borisov
5. Alexander Ivanovich Ivanov
1. Vasily Rodionovich Filippov (1952-1958)
2. Nikolai Vasilyevich Barnakov (1958-1962)
3. Vasily Rodionovich Filippov (1962-1969)
4. Kim Dmitrievich Mironov (1969-1977)
5. Andrey Tsyrenovich Balduev (1977-1997)
1. Alexander Petrovich Popov (1997-2013)
2. Ivan Anisimovich Kalashnikov (acting 2013-2019)
3. Galsan Evgenievich Dareev (2019–2021)
4. Belikto Batoevich Tsybikov (2021-present)

== Gallery ==
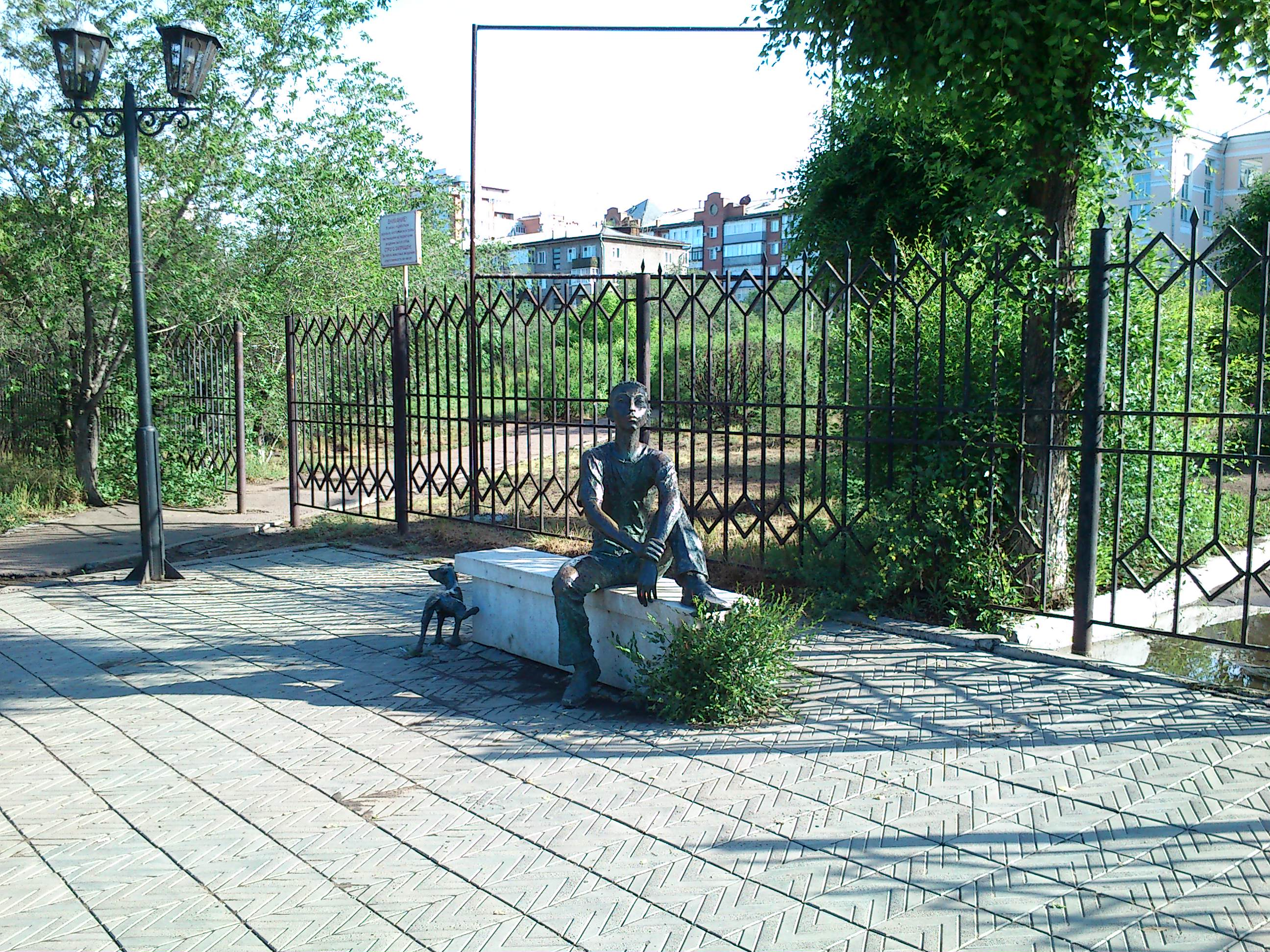
Sculpture of BSAA Student

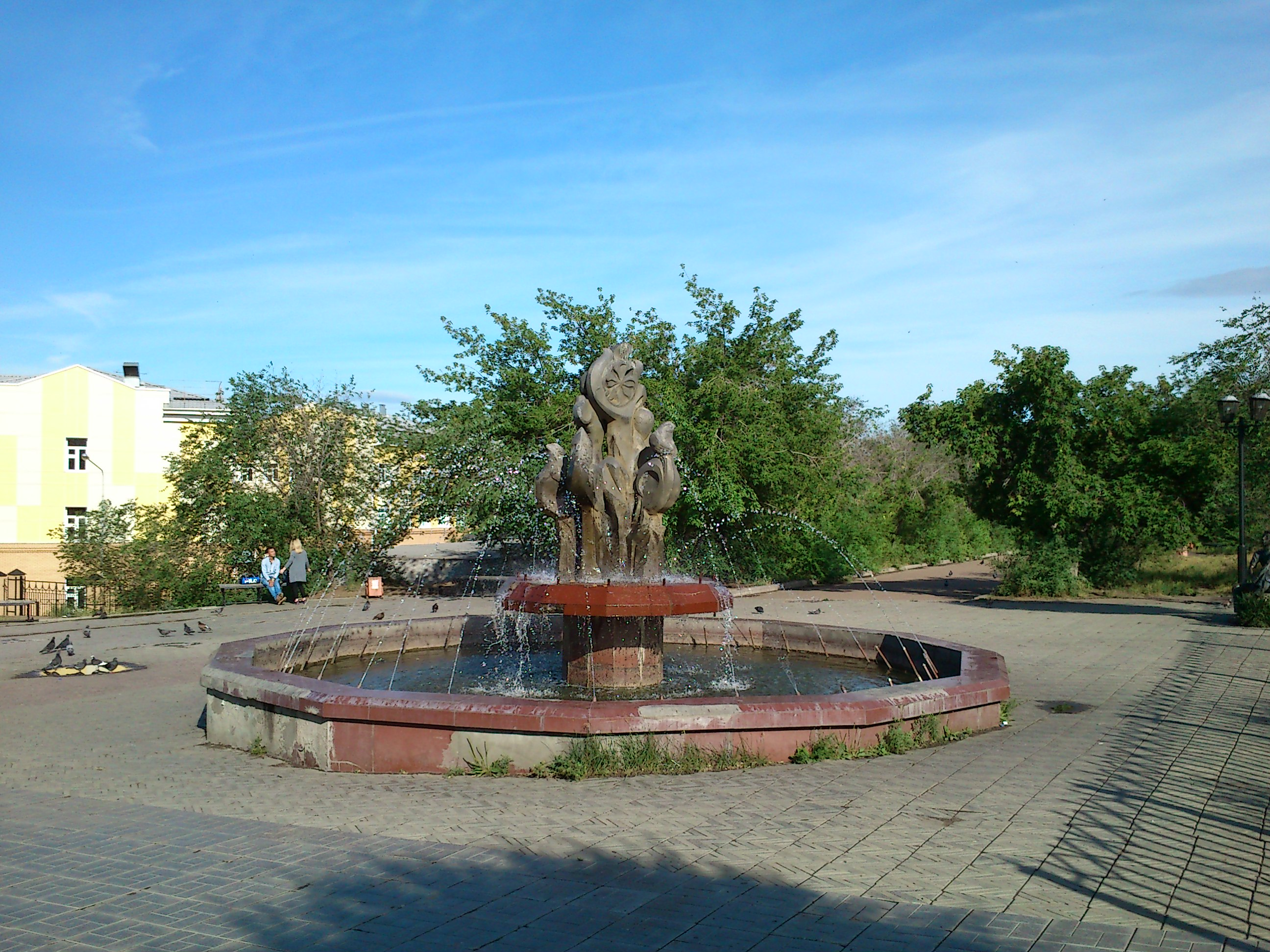
Fountain near BSAA

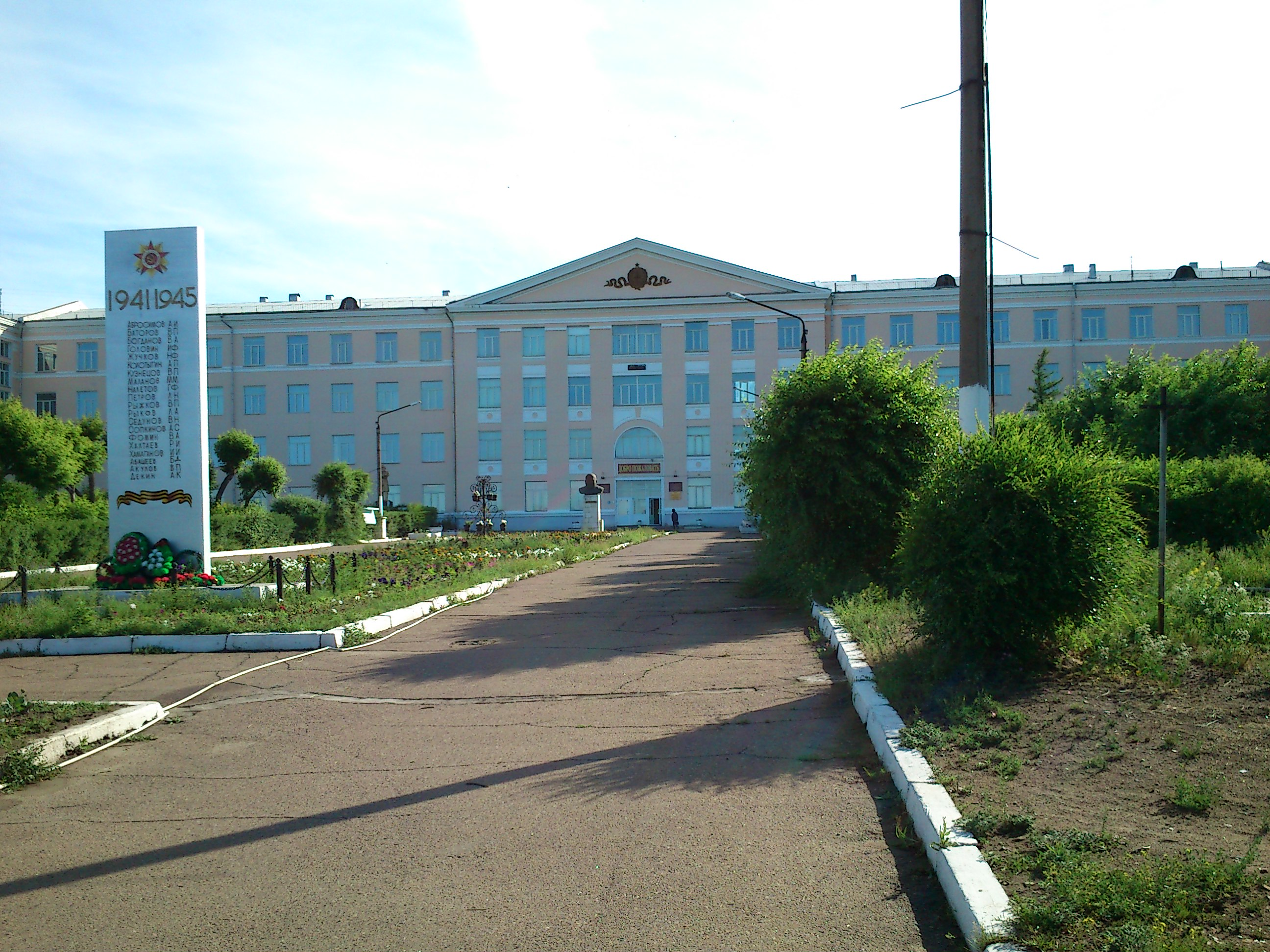
BSAA building

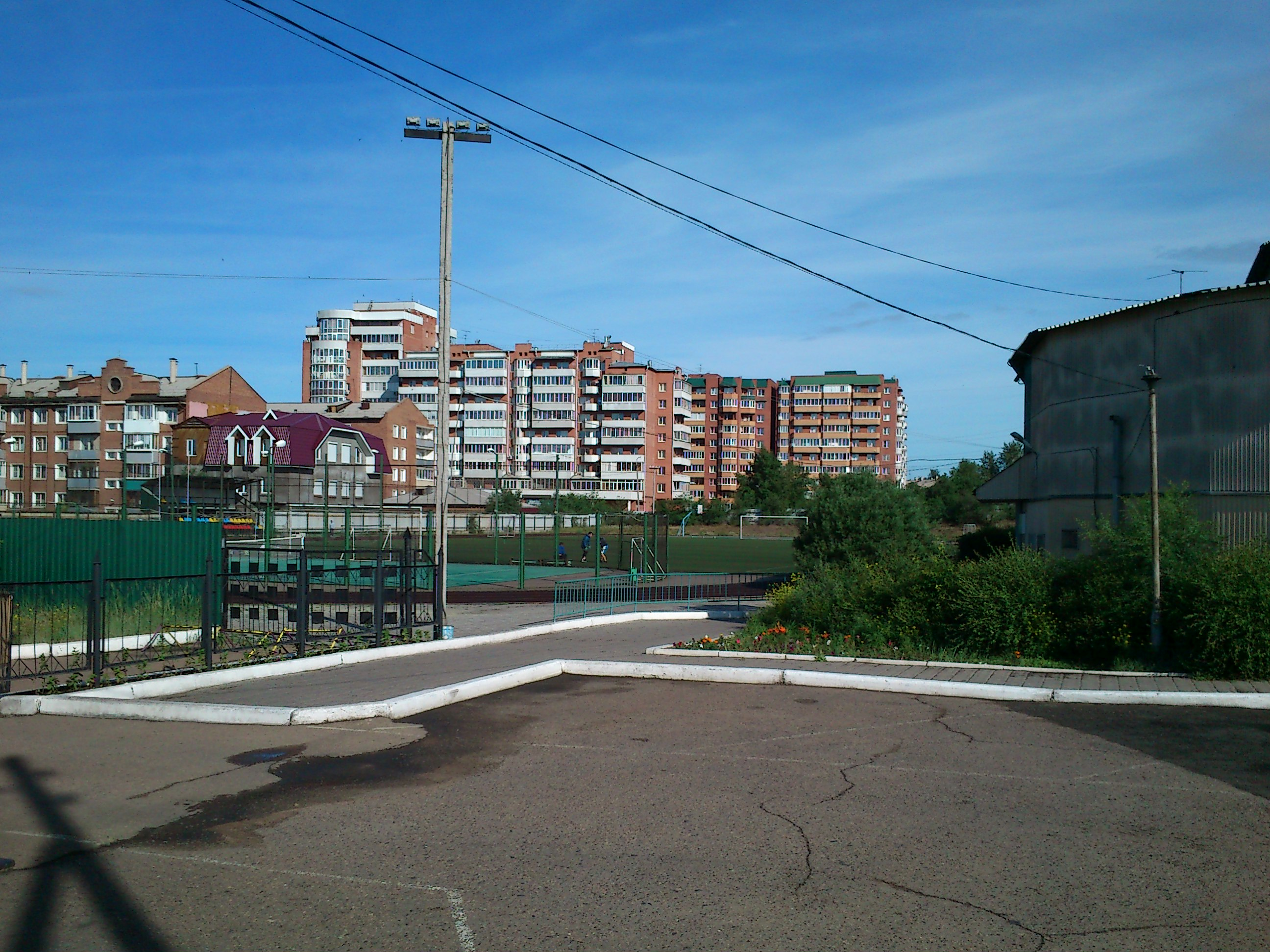
BGSHA sports center
