= 2023 Buryatia People's Khural election =

← 2018	10 September 2023	2028 →
- Turnout: 36.26%
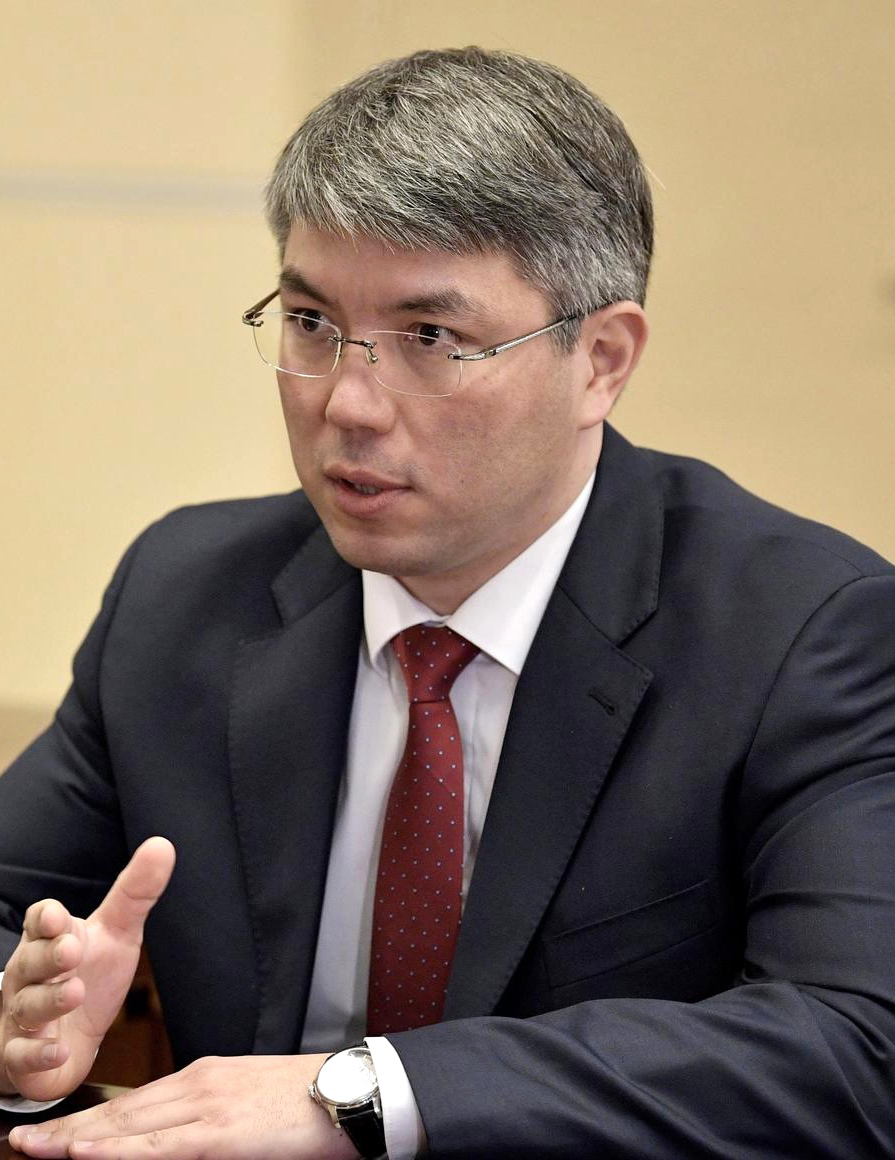

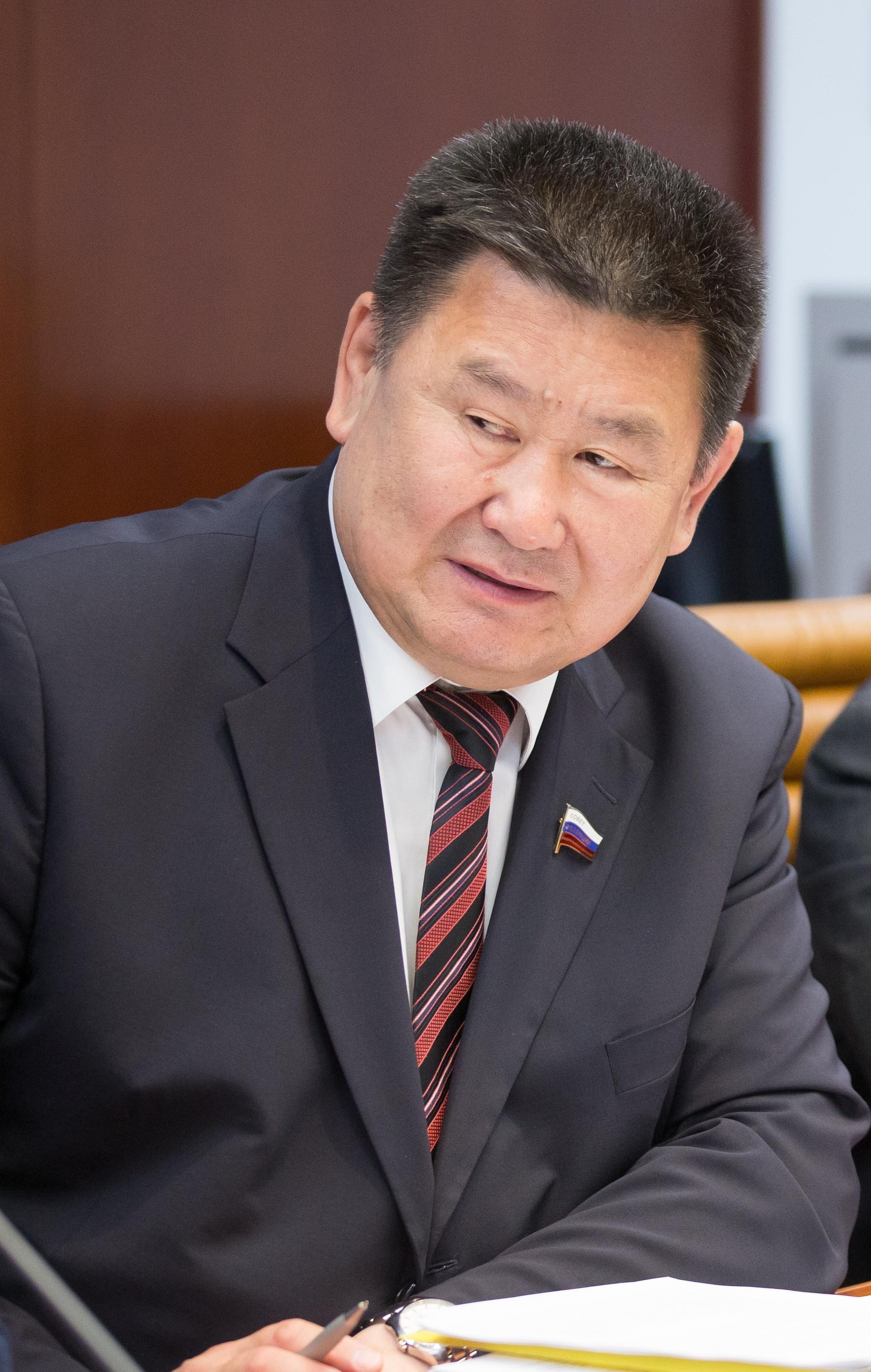

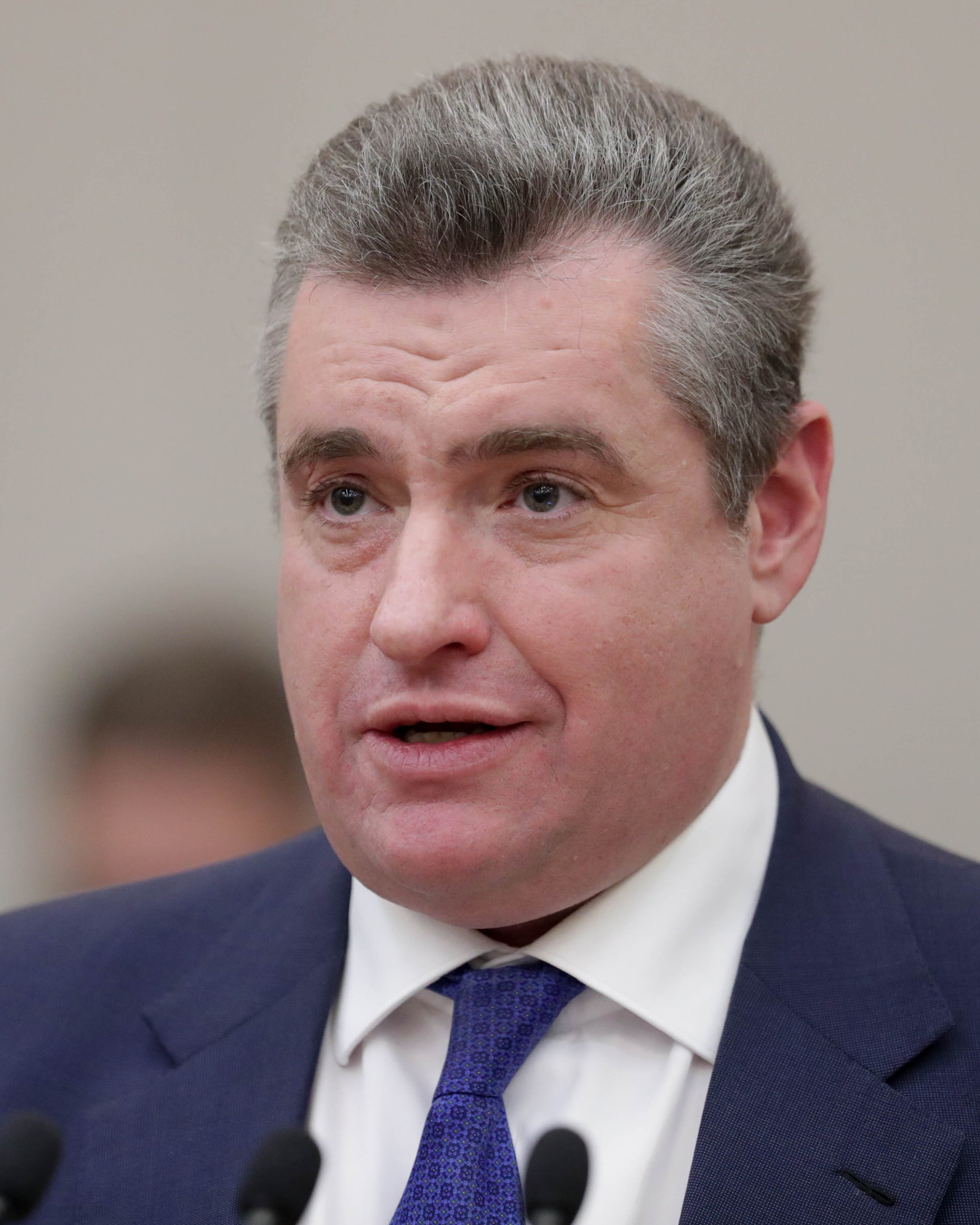
	Majority party	Minority party	Third party
			NL
Candidate	Alexey Tsydenov	Vyacheslav Markhayev	Maksim Buvalin
Party	United Russia	CPRF	New People
Last election	40 seats, 41.01%	13 seats, 25.62%	Did not exist
Seats won	51	7	5
Seat change	▲11	▼6	Did not exist
Popular vote	154,827	43,473	21,088
Percentage	60.84%	17.08%	8.29%
Swing	▲19.83%	▼8.54%	Did not exist
	Fourth party	Fifth party
		SR-ZP
Candidate	Leonid Slutsky	Sergey Pashinsky
Party	LDPR	SR-ZP
Last election	4 seats, 12.02%	6 seats, 9.49%
Seats won	2	0
Seat change	▼2	▼6
Popular vote	15,682	11,983
Percentage	6.16%	4.71%
Swing	▼5.86%	▼4.78%

The 2023 People's Khural of the Republic of Buryatia election took place on 10 September 2023, on common election day. All 66 seats in the People's Khural were up for reelection.

== Electoral system ==
Under current election laws, the People's Khural is elected for a term of five years, with parallel voting. 33 seats are elected by party-list proportional representation with a 5% electoral threshold, with the other half elected in 33 single-member constituencies by first-past-the-post voting. Seats in the proportional part are allocated using the Imperiali quota, modified to ensure that every party list, which passes the threshold, receives at least one mandate.

== Candidates ==
=== Party lists ===
To register regional lists of candidates, parties need to collect 0.5% of signatures of all registered voters in Buryatia.

The following parties were relieved from the necessity to collect signatures:

- United Russia
- Communist Party of the Russian Federation
- A Just Russia — Patriots — For Truth
- Liberal Democratic Party of Russia
- New People
- Russian Party of Freedom and Justice

№	Party	Republic-wide list	Candidates	Territorial groups	Status
1	United Russia	Alexey Tsydenov • Leonid Belykh • Vyacheslav Dondokov • Galina Gorbatykh • Zhambal-Zhamso Zhanayev	109	33	Registered
2	Communist Party	Vyacheslav Markhayev • Viktor Malyshenko • Bair Tsyrenov • ~~Tatyana Baslova~~ • Aleksandr Flusov	108	33	Registered
3	New People	Maksim Buvalin • Semyon Matkheyev • Vladimir Khabituyev	41	24	Registered
4	Liberal Democratic Party	Leonid Slutsky • Sergey Dorosh • Badmadorzho Zhigzhitov • Dmitry Shishmarev • Margarita Sanzhizhapova	71	32	Registered
5	A Just Russia – For Truth	Sergey Pashinsky • Dmitry Ionin • Oksana Bukholtseva	32	29	Registered

New People will take part in Buryat legislative election for the first time. Civic Platform and Russian Party of Freedom and Justice (then known as Communist Party of Social Justice), who participated in the last election, did not file.

=== Single-mandate constituencies ===
33 single-mandate constituencies were formed in Buryatia. To register candidates in single-mandate constituencies need to collect 3% of signatures of registered voters in the constituency.

Number of candidates in single-mandate constituencies
Party	Candidates	
Party	Nominated	Registered
United Russia	33	31
Communist Party	32	32
Liberal Democratic Party	30	28
A Just Russia — For Truth	26	26
New People	19	18
Independent	11	2
Total	151	137

== Results ==
=== Results by party lists ===
Summary of the 10 September 2023 People's Khural of the Republic of Buryatia election results
Party	Party list					Constituency		Total	
Party	Votes	%	±pp	Seats	+/–	Seats	+/–	Seats	+/–
United Russia	154,827	60.84	▲19.83%	22	▲6	29	▲5	51	▲11
Communist Party	43,473	17.08	▼9.54%	6	▼4	1	▼2	7	▼6
New People	21,088	8.29	New	3	New	2	New	5	New
Liberal Democratic Party	15,682	6.16	▼5.86%	2	▼2	0	Steady	2	▼2
A Just Russia — For Truth	11,983	4.71	▼4.78%	0	▼3	0	▼3	0	▼6
Independents	—	—	—	—	—	1	▼2	1	▼2
Invalid ballots	7,434	2.92	▼1.61%	—	—	—	—	—	—
Total	254,487	100.00	—	33	Steady	33	Steady	66	Steady
Turnout	254,487	36.26	▼3.29%	—	—	—	—	—	—
Registered voters	701,899	100.00	—	—	—	—	—	—	—

Vladimir Pavlov (United Russia) was re-elected as Chairman of the People's Khural, while incumbent Senator Alexander Varfolomeev (United Russia) was re-appointed to the Federation Council.

=== Results in single-member constituencies ===
==== District 1 ====
Summary of the 10 September 2023 People’s Khural of the Republic of Buryatia election in District 1
Candidate	Party	Votes	%
Nikolay Dasheyev (incumbent)	United Russia	4,619	52.00%
Vladimir Kharmakshanov	Communist Party	2,171	24.44%
Oleg Soktoyev	Liberal Democratic Party	1,134	12.77%
Pavel Bildayev	New People	500	5.63%
Total		8,883	100%

==== District 2 ====
Summary of the 10 September 2023 People’s Khural of the Republic of Buryatia election in District 2
Candidate	Party	Votes	%
Gennady Dorzhiyev (incumbent)	United Russia	10,505	90.25%
Bair Ochirov	Communist Party	742	6.37%
Boris Semenov	New People	194	1.67%
Aleksey Mandanov	Liberal Democratic Party	122	1.05%
Total		11,640	100%

==== District 3 ====
Summary of the 10 September 2023 People’s Khural of the Republic of Buryatia election in District 3
Candidate	Party	Votes	%
Sergey Pashinsky (incumbent)	United Russia	8,717	75.37%
Sergey Fedoseyev	Communist Party	1,781	15.40%
Erdyni Erdyneyev	New People	545	4.71%
Total		11,566	100%

==== District 4 ====
Summary of the 10 September 2023 People’s Khural of the Republic of Buryatia election in District 4
Candidate	Party	Votes	%
Vyacheslav Tsybikzhapov	United Russia	4,416	52.22%
Yulia Maltseva	Liberal Democratic Party	1,386	16.39%
Aleksandr Kerimov	Communist Party	1,150	13.60%
Sergey Lesnikov	New People	945	11.17%
Denis Mordvin	A Just Russia — For Truth	332	3.93%
Total		8,457	100%

==== District 5 ====
Summary of the 10 September 2023 People’s Khural of the Republic of Buryatia election in District 5
Candidate	Party	Votes	%
Bair Munkuyev	United Russia	2,313	26.51%
Igor Lesnoy	A Just Russia — For Truth	2,113	24.22%
Anatoly Krasikov	New People	1,837	21.06%
Nikolay Sodboyev	Communist Party	1,809	20.74%
Total		8,724	100%

==== District 6 ====
Summary of the 10 September 2023 People’s Khural of the Republic of Buryatia election in District 6
Candidate	Party	Votes	%
Albina Ilyina	United Russia	3,462	47.95%
Aleksandr Dimov	New People	1,183	16.39%
Isa Balakishiyev	Communist Party	733	10.15%
Oksana Afanasyeva	A Just Russia — For Truth	719	9.96%
Mikhail Polyutov	Liberal Democratic Party	681	9.43%
Total		7,220	100%

==== District 7 ====
Summary of the 10 September 2023 People’s Khural of the Republic of Buryatia election in District 7
Candidate	Party	Votes	%
Lilia Deyeva (incumbent)	Independent	4,073	62.38%
Sergey Burlakov	Communist Party	788	12.07%
Ivan Fadeyev	United Russia	683	10.46%
Valery Kochnev	Liberal Democratic Party	652	9.99%
Total		6,529	100%

==== District 8 ====
Summary of the 10 September 2023 People’s Khural of the Republic of Buryatia election in District 8
Candidate	Party	Votes	%
Aleksandr Krasovsky	United Russia	3,064	57.42%
Aldar Galsanov	New People	1,227	22.99%
Valery Molokov	Communist Party	558	10.46%
Artur Zhigzhitov	Liberal Democratic Party	202	3.79%
Oleg Molokov	A Just Russia — For Truth	84	1.57%
Total		5,336	100%

==== District 9 ====
Summary of the 10 September 2023 People’s Khural of the Republic of Buryatia election in District 9
Candidate	Party	Votes	%
Aleksandr Tsydenov (incumbent)	United Russia	4,604	51.02%
Sonom Galsanov	Communist Party	2,056	22.78%
Namzhilma Borkhonova	A Just Russia — For Truth	938	10.39%
Vladimir Oshorov	New People	529	5.86%
Yury Golyuk	Liberal Democratic Party	463	5.13%
Total		9,024	100%

==== District 10 ====
Summary of the 10 September 2023 People’s Khural of the Republic of Buryatia election in District 10
Candidate	Party	Votes	%
Anatoly Kushnarev (incumbent)	United Russia	2,974	42.07%
Aleksandr Terekhov	A Just Russia — For Truth	1,762	24.92%
Yelena Myasnikova	Communist Party	1,224	17.31%
Yulia Zhovtun	New People	449	6.35%
Yulia Tikhonova	Liberal Democratic Party	403	5.70%
Total		7,070	100%

==== District 11 ====
Summary of the 10 September 2023 People’s Khural of the Republic of Buryatia election in District 11
Candidate	Party	Votes	%
Maksim Ismagilov	United Russia	3,115	37.57%
Bair Zonduyev	New People	1,995	24.06%
Aleksandr Bairov	Independent	1,541	18.58%
Sergey Falileyev	Communist Party	583	7.03%
Vyacheslav Kozulin	Liberal Democratic Party	432	5.21%
Yelena Pantyukhina	A Just Russia — For Truth	329	3.97%
Total		8,292	100%

==== District 12 ====
Summary of the 10 September 2023 People’s Khural of the Republic of Buryatia election in District 12
Candidate	Party	Votes	%
Vladimir Pavlov	United Russia	6,878	85.66%
Olga Gasanova	Communist Party	666	8.41%
Dmitry Shishmarev	Liberal Democratic Party	138	1.74%
Total		7,923	100%

==== District 13 ====
Summary of the 10 September 2023 People’s Khural of the Republic of Buryatia election in District 13
Candidate	Party	Votes	%
Aleksandr Baturin	United Russia	4,601	56.54%
Vladimir Gulyayev	New People	1,767	21.71%
Zolto Batuyev	A Just Russia — For Truth	723	8.88%
Sergey Burlakov	Communist Party	676	8.31%
Total		8,138	100%

==== District 14 ====
Summary of the 10 September 2023 People’s Khural of the Republic of Buryatia election in District 14
Candidate	Party	Votes	%
Gennady Badmayev	New People	2,981	52.72%
Bair Tsyrenov (incumbent)	Communist Party	1,629	28.81%
Aleksandr Lyubchenko	Liberal Democratic Party	566	10.01%
Mikhail Tsyrenov	A Just Russia — For Truth	243	4.30%
Total		5,654	100%

==== District 15 ====
Summary of the 10 September 2023 People’s Khural of the Republic of Buryatia election in District 15
Candidate	Party	Votes	%
Denis Garmayev	United Russia	2,762	57.33%
Erzhena Chimittsyrenova (incumbent)	Communist Party	1,181	24.51%
Vitaly Kornakov	A Just Russia — For Truth	434	9.01%
Aleksandra Sandanova	Liberal Democratic Party	269	5.58%
Total		4,818	100%

==== District 16 ====
Summary of the 10 September 2023 People’s Khural of the Republic of Buryatia election in District 16
Candidate	Party	Votes	%
Tatyana Mantatova (incumbent)	United Russia	3,399	57.06%
Timur Nimayev	Communist Party	1,425	23.92%
Ruslan Komarov	Liberal Democratic Party	462	7.76%
Stanislav Khromenok	A Just Russia — For Truth	404	6.78%
Total		5,957	100%

==== District 17 ====
Summary of the 10 September 2023 People’s Khural of the Republic of Buryatia election in District 17
Candidate	Party	Votes	%
Innokenty Vakhrameyev (incumbent)	United Russia	2,132	42.68%
Tumen Dondokov	Communist Party	1,270	25.43%
Vladimir Manzhuyev	A Just Russia — For Truth	873	17.48%
Yelena Vokhmanova	Liberal Democratic Party	494	9.89%
Total		4,995	100%

==== District 18 ====
Summary of the 10 September 2023 People’s Khural of the Republic of Buryatia election in District 18
Candidate	Party	Votes	%
Yelena Vakhrushkinova	United Russia	2,242	40.68%
Maksim Kireyenko	New People	1,207	21.90%
Leonty Krasovsky	Communist Party	1,165	21.14%
Aleksandr Puzyrkov	Liberal Democratic Party	363	6.59%
Sergey Kharakshinov	A Just Russia — For Truth	328	5.95%
Total		5,511	100%

==== District 19 ====
Summary of the 10 September 2023 People’s Khural of the Republic of Buryatia election in District 19
Candidate	Party	Votes	%
Pyotr Mordovskoy	United Russia	2,661	58.34%
Danila Dorzhiyev	Communist Party	755	16.55%
Aleksey Belyayev	A Just Russia — For Truth	620	13.59%
Boris Ponyayev	Liberal Democratic Party	318	6.97%
Total		4,561	100%

==== District 20 ====
Summary of the 10 September 2023 People’s Khural of the Republic of Buryatia election in District 20
Candidate	Party	Votes	%
Dolgor Norboyeva	United Russia	2,665	46.00%
Chingis Bolotov	New People	1,269	21.90%
Aleksey Bagadayev	Communist Party	1,084	18.71%
Maksim Sorochinsky	A Just Russia — For Truth	277	4.78%
Igor Chernysh	Liberal Democratic Party	265	4.57%
Total		5,794	100%

==== District 21 ====
Summary of the 10 September 2023 People’s Khural of the Republic of Buryatia election in District 21
Candidate	Party	Votes	%
Oleg Badluyev	United Russia	2,645	53.32%
Vladimir Obogoyev	Communist Party	1,202	24.23%
Vladimir Fendrikov	A Just Russia — For Truth	812	16.37%
Total		4,961	100%

==== District 22 ====
Summary of the 10 September 2023 People’s Khural of the Republic of Buryatia election in District 22
Candidate	Party	Votes	%
Mikhail Stepanov (incumbent)	United Russia	2,508	58.26%
Aleksey Shadrin	Communist Party	544	12.64%
Yulia Atnyukhina	A Just Russia — For Truth	542	12.59%
Timofey Pukhovskoy	Liberal Democratic Party	284	6.60%
Sergey Mozolin	New People	243	5.64%
Total		4,305	100%

==== District 23 ====
Summary of the 10 September 2023 People’s Khural of the Republic of Buryatia election in District 23
Candidate	Party	Votes	%
Vadim Bredniy	United Russia	4,058	69.85%
Bato Badmazhapov	New People	643	11.07%
Yekaterina Belova	Liberal Democratic Party	448	7.71%
Tatyana Makhutova	A Just Russia — For Truth	383	6.59%
Total		4,058	100%

==== District 24 ====
Summary of the 10 September 2023 People’s Khural of the Republic of Buryatia election in District 24
Candidate	Party	Votes	%
Maksim Buvalin	New People	2,201	47.75%
Viktor Malyshenko	Communist Party	1,290	27.99%
Vladimir Ivanov	A Just Russia — For Truth	477	10.35%
Aleksandr Zhigzhitov	Liberal Democratic Party	372	8.07%
Total		4,609	100%

==== District 25 ====
Summary of the 10 September 2023 People’s Khural of the Republic of Buryatia election in District 25
Candidate	Party	Votes	%
Mikhail Gergenov (incumbent)	United Russia	2,400	51.97%
Dmitry Teslenko	Liberal Democratic Party	734	15.89%
Vladislav Anikeyev	Communist Party	684	14.81%
Sayan Aramkhiyev	New People	389	8.42%
Sergey Suvorov	A Just Russia — For Truth	252	5.46%
Total		4,618	100%

==== District 26 ====
Summary of the 10 September 2023 People’s Khural of the Republic of Buryatia election in District 26
Candidate	Party	Votes	%
Igor Markovets (incumbent)	United Russia	3,791	67.84%
Vasily Tkachev	Communist Party	766	13.71%
Yelena Litvinova	A Just Russia — For Truth	486	8.70%
Andrey Zonkhoyev	Liberal Democratic Party	299	5.35%
Total		5,588	100%

==== District 27 ====
Summary of the 10 September 2023 People’s Khural of the Republic of Buryatia election in District 27
Candidate	Party	Votes	%
Belikto Tsybikov (incumbent)	United Russia	9,103	78.31%
Vadim Nimayev	Communist Party	979	8.42%
Chingis Zhambalov	A Just Russia — For Truth	770	6.62%
Margarita Sanzhizhapova	Liberal Democratic Party	560	4.82%
Total		11,624	100%

==== District 28 ====
Summary of the 10 September 2023 People’s Khural of the Republic of Buryatia election in District 28
Candidate	Party	Votes	%
Sergey Mezenin	Communist Party	3,497	45.28%
Oksana Trishkina	United Russia	3,248	42.06%
Dmitry Bespalov	A Just Russia — For Truth	322	4.17%
Mikhail Yeliseyev	Liberal Democratic Party	289	3.74%
Total		7,723	100%

==== District 29 ====
Summary of the 10 September 2023 People’s Khural of the Republic of Buryatia election in District 29
Candidate	Party	Votes	%
Anatoly Dymchikov	United Russia	7,146	78.62%
Aleksandr Karnaukhov	A Just Russia — For Truth	789	8.68%
Anna Norboyeva	Communist Party	714	7.86%
Solbon Bodeyev	Liberal Democratic Party	289	3.18%
Total		9,089	100%

==== District 30 ====
Summary of the 10 September 2023 People’s Khural of the Republic of Buryatia election in District 30
Candidate	Party	Votes	%
Svetlana Garmayeva	United Russia	3,970	74.37%
Natalya Gorodetskaya	Communist Party	795	14.89%
Anton Yakovlev	Liberal Democratic Party	338	6.33%
Total		5,338	100%

==== District 31 ====
Summary of the 10 September 2023 People’s Khural of the Republic of Buryatia election in District 31
Candidate	Party	Votes	%
Bair Garmayev (incumbent)	United Russia	7,065	80.93%
Andrey Chinavlev	Communist Party	1,463	16.76%
Total		8,730	100%

==== District 32 ====
Summary of the 10 September 2023 People’s Khural of the Republic of Buryatia election in District 32
Candidate	Party	Votes	%
Sergey Kozlov (incumbent)	United Russia	2,280	56.24%
Aleksey Sazonov	Communist Party	777	19.17%
Oleg Golyuk	Liberal Democratic Party	415	10.24%
Aleksandr Afonin	A Just Russia — For Truth	379	9.35%
Total		4,054	100%

==== District 33 ====
Summary of the 10 September 2023 People’s Khural of the Republic of Buryatia election in District 33
Candidate	Party	Votes	%
Andrey Nevyantsev	United Russia	3,159	56.57%
Oksana Bukholtseva (incumbent)	A Just Russia — For Truth	1,210	21.67%
Viktor Maltsev	Communist Party	883	15.81%
Timofey Rasputin	Liberal Democratic Party	208	3.72%
Total		5,584	100%

== See also ==
- 2023 Russian regional elections
