= Nikolay Kondakov =

Russian politician (1949–2026)

- Николай Кондаков
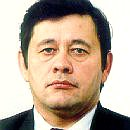
- Kondakov in 1993

Member of the State Duma for Buryatia
- In office 17 January 1994 – 17 January 1996

Personal details
- Born: 1 December 1949 Povorot, Buryat ASSR, Russian SFSR, Soviet Union
- Died: 6 March 2026 (aged 76) Russia
- Party: APR; CPRF
- Education: East Siberia State University of Technology and Management
- Occupation: Engineer

Nikolay Yakovlevich Kondakov (Russian: Николай Яковлевич Кондаков; 1 December 1949 – 6 March 2026) was a Russian politician. A member of the Agrarian Party and later the Communist Party, he served in the State Duma from 1994 to 1996.

Kondakov died on 6 March 2026, at the age of 76.
