= Vyacheslav Damdintsurunov =

Russian politician (born 1977)

- Вячеслав Дамдинцурунов
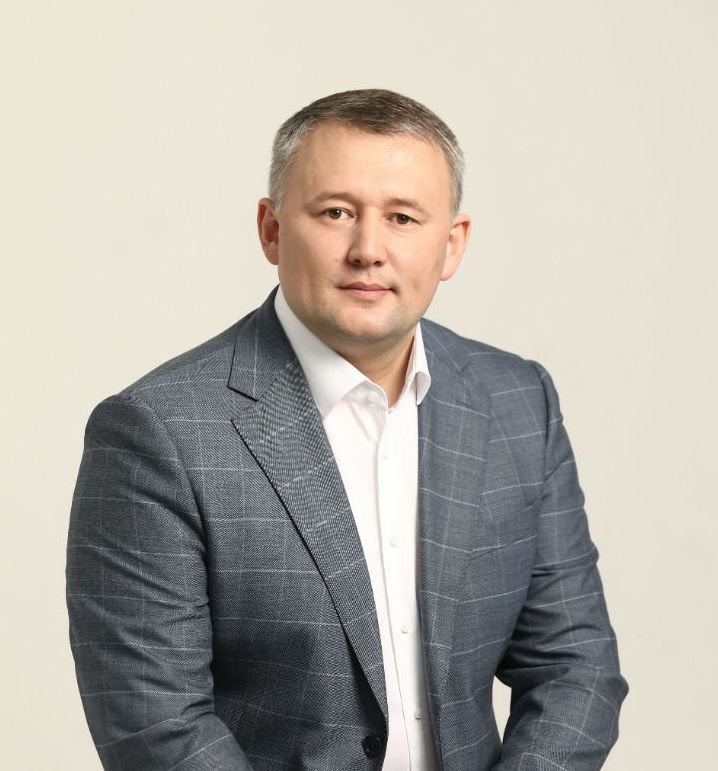

Member of the State Duma
- Incumbent
- Assumed office 12 October 2021
- Preceded by: Aldar Damdinov
- Succeeded by: Dashibal Munkozhargalov
- Constituency: Party list (2026-); Buryatia (No.9) (2021-2026)

Minister of Sports and Youth Policy of Buryatia
- In office 14 December 2017 – 24 September 2021

Personal details
- Born: 21 September 1977 (age 49) Katangar, Petrovsk-Zabaykalsky District, RSFSR, USSR
- Party: United Russia
- Education: Buryat State University

Vyacheslav Anatolyevich Damdintsurunov (Russian: Вячеслав Анатольевич Дамдинцурунов; born September 21, 1977) is a Russian politician and athlete who is a member of the State Duma.

Damdintsurunov is a professional sportsman; in 1999, he became the Russian champion in Muay Thai. Damdintsurunov had been working for more than 13 years on developing and implementing sports policies in the region. Damdintsurunov is also a former vice-rector of the Russian State University of Physical Education, Sport, Youth and Tourism. In 2017, he was appointed the Minister of Sports and Youth Policy of Buryatia. He resigned in 2021 after he was elected a deputy from the Buryatia constituency of the State Duma of the 8th convocation. He lost his seat in the State Duma in 2026; after losing in the United Russia primary.

Vyacheslav Damdintsurunov is married and has three children.

== Sanctions ==
On February 25, 2022, in the context of Russia’s invasion of Ukraine, he was included in the European Union sanctions list in response to Russia’s decision to recognize the territories of Ukraine’s Donetsk and Luhansk regions and to send Russian troops there.

On March 11, 2022, he was added to the United Kingdom sanctions list "for recognizing the independence of two separatist regions in Ukraine".

On September 30, 2022, he was placed under sanctions by the United States in response to the "sham referenda" and the "annexation of Ukrainian territories by Russian occupying forces". The U.S. Department of State noted that deputies had unanimously passed the law on "fake news", and some deputies played a key role in spreading Russian disinformation about the war.

He is also subject to sanctions by Switzerland, Australia, Japan, Ukraine, and New Zealand.

== Awards ==
- In 2017, Vyacheslav Damdintsurunov was awarded the honorary sports title Honored Coach of the Russian Federation.
- Recipient of two medals: the Commemorative Medal "XXII Olympic Winter Games and XI Paralympic Winter Games, Sochi 2014" and the "80 Years of Sambo" Medal of the All-Russian Sambo Federation (2018).

He has received a Letter of Gratitude from the Minister of Sport of the Russian Federation (2020), Letters of Gratitude from the Head of the Republic of Buryatia (2018, 2020), a Letter of Gratitude from the Russian Union of Martial Arts (2018), as well as recognition from the Russian Wrestling Federation and the Russian State University of Physical Education, Sport, Youth and Tourism (2014).

He has also been awarded several honorary certificates, including: a Certificate of the President of Russia attached to the commemorative medal "For Selfless Contribution to the Organization of the All-Russian Mutual Aid Campaign #WeAreTogether" (2020), a Certificate from the Minister of Defence of the Russian Federation (2020), a certificate from the All-Russian Physical Culture and Sports Society "Dynamo" (2019), and a certificate from the Russian State University of Physical Education, Sport, Youth and Tourism (2016).

== Income and property ==
Vyacheslav Damdintsurunov earned 3.9 million rubles in 2020 (compared to 2.4 million rubles the previous year). His assets include a land plot measuring 800 square meters, an apartment with an area of 56.1 square meters, and a Toyota Camry automobile. His wife’s income in 2020 amounted to approximately 517 thousand rubles (373 thousand rubles in 2019); she owns no property.

== Family ==
Since 2001 he has been married to Natalya Damdintsurunova. The couple has three children: a daughter, Altana, and two sons, Dorzhi and Aldar.
