= Gunsyn Tsydenova =

Soviet veterinarian and politician (1909–1994)

- Гунсын Цыденова
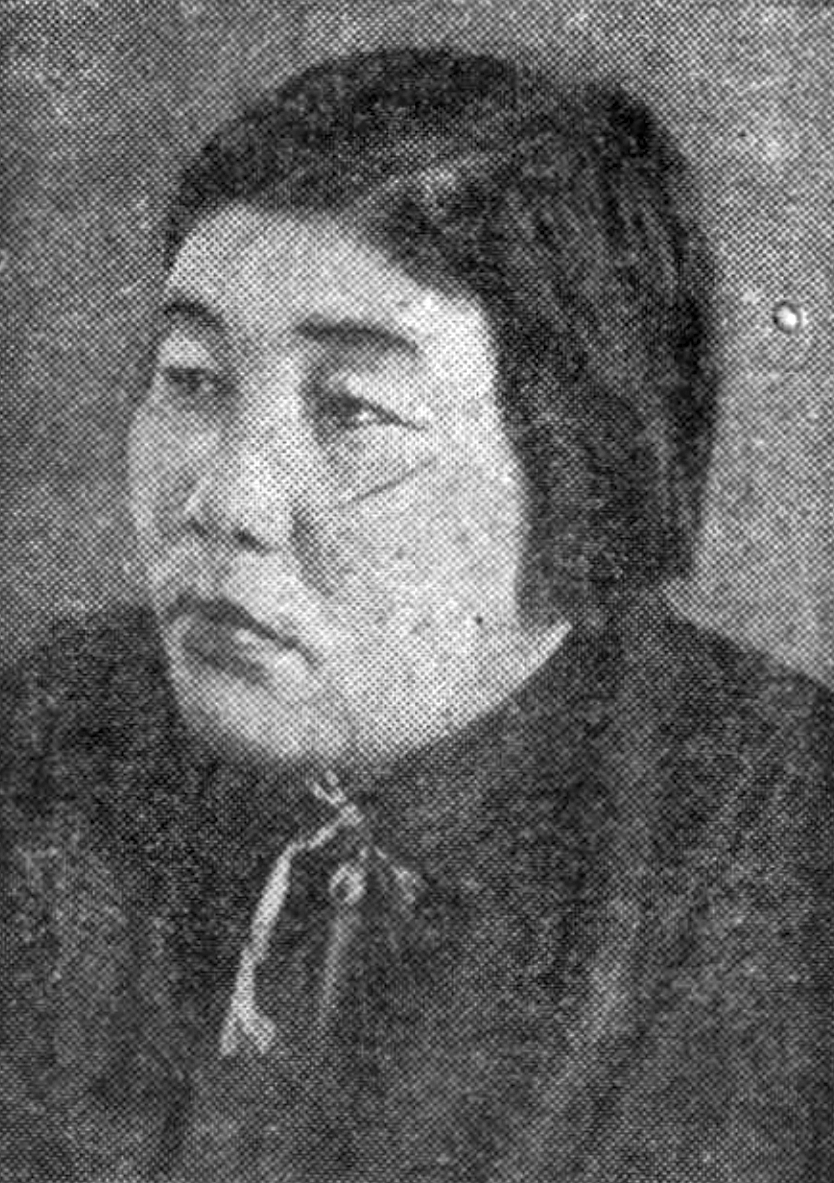

Chairman of the Presidium of the Supreme Soviet of the Buryat-Mongol ASSR
- In office 12 April 1941 – 25 March 1947
- Preceded by: Gombo Belgaev
- Succeeded by: Dorji Tsyrempilon

Personal details
- Born: May 1909 Ust-Orot, Transbaikal Oblast, Russian Empire
- Died: 1994 (aged 84–85) Ulan-Ude, Buryatia, Russia
- Party: AUCP(b)

Gunsyn Ayusheevna Tsydenova (Russian: Гунсын Аюшеевна Цыденова; May 1909 – 1994) was a Soviet veterinarian and politician who served as the chairman of the Presidium of the Supreme Soviet of the Buryat-Mongol Autonomous Soviet Socialist Republic from 1941 until 1947, leading the ASSR through World War II. Tsydenova also served a deputy of the Supreme Soviet of the Soviet Union from 1937 until 1954.

== Biography ==
Gunsen Ayusheevna Tsydenova was born in May 1909 in the village of Ust-Orot, then part of the Transbaikal Oblast of the Russian Empire. An ethnic Buryat, Tsydenova worked with her grandmother as a household servant until 1929, when she joined an agricultural artel. In 1931, Tsydenova joined the All-Union Communist Party (Bolsheviks), and began rising through the party ranks in the Buryat-Mongol Autonomous Soviet Socialist Republic. On the recommendation of the Khorinsky District party committee, she began studying at the Kyakhta Soviet Party School in 1933. After graduating the following year, she was elected chairman of the collective farm "Stalin's Way" in the Khorinsky District. Tsydenova also became a member of the somon of Ashanginsky, serving as chairman from 1935 until 1937. From September 1938 until April 1941, Tsydenova attended the agricultural college in Ulan-Ude.

In 1937, Tsydenova was elected a deputy of the Supreme Soviet of the Soviet Union. She served in the first, second, and third convocations of the Supreme Soviet, leaving office in 1954. In 1937 and 1938, she became an instructor in the AUCP(b) apparatus of the Khorinsky District and the Buryat-Mongol ASSR. In 1939, she was a named a people's assessor of the Supreme Court of the Russian Soviet Federative Socialist Republic. On 12 April 1941, Tsydenova was elected chairman of the Presidium of the Supreme Soviet of the Buryat-Mongol ASSR. In this position, Tsydenova led Buryatia through World War II. Tsydenova was responsible for the rationing of food and supplies and traveled to rural areas, where she "informed and talked about front-line affairs, and provided constant assistance in organizing the harvest and the delivery of agricultural products to the state". Tsydenova held the office of chairman until 25 March 1947.

Tsydenova attended the Buryat Agricultural Institute and the Ulan-Ude Veterinary Institute after the war, graduating with a veterinary diploma and working in the clinic. From 1953 until 1954, Tsydenova was the chairman of the collective farm "F. Engels". She later held senior veterinary roles in Chesan and Verkhnekodunsky until her retirement in 1960.

Tsydenova died in Ulan-Ude in 1994. She was a recipient of the Order of the Badge of Honor and had been named "Honored Veterinarian of the Buryat ASSR". Following her death, the Republic of Buryatia renamed a street in the village of Kizhinga after Tsydenova and installed a memorial plaque at her home in Ulan-Ude.
