= Sergey Zverev =

Russian hairdresser (born 1963)

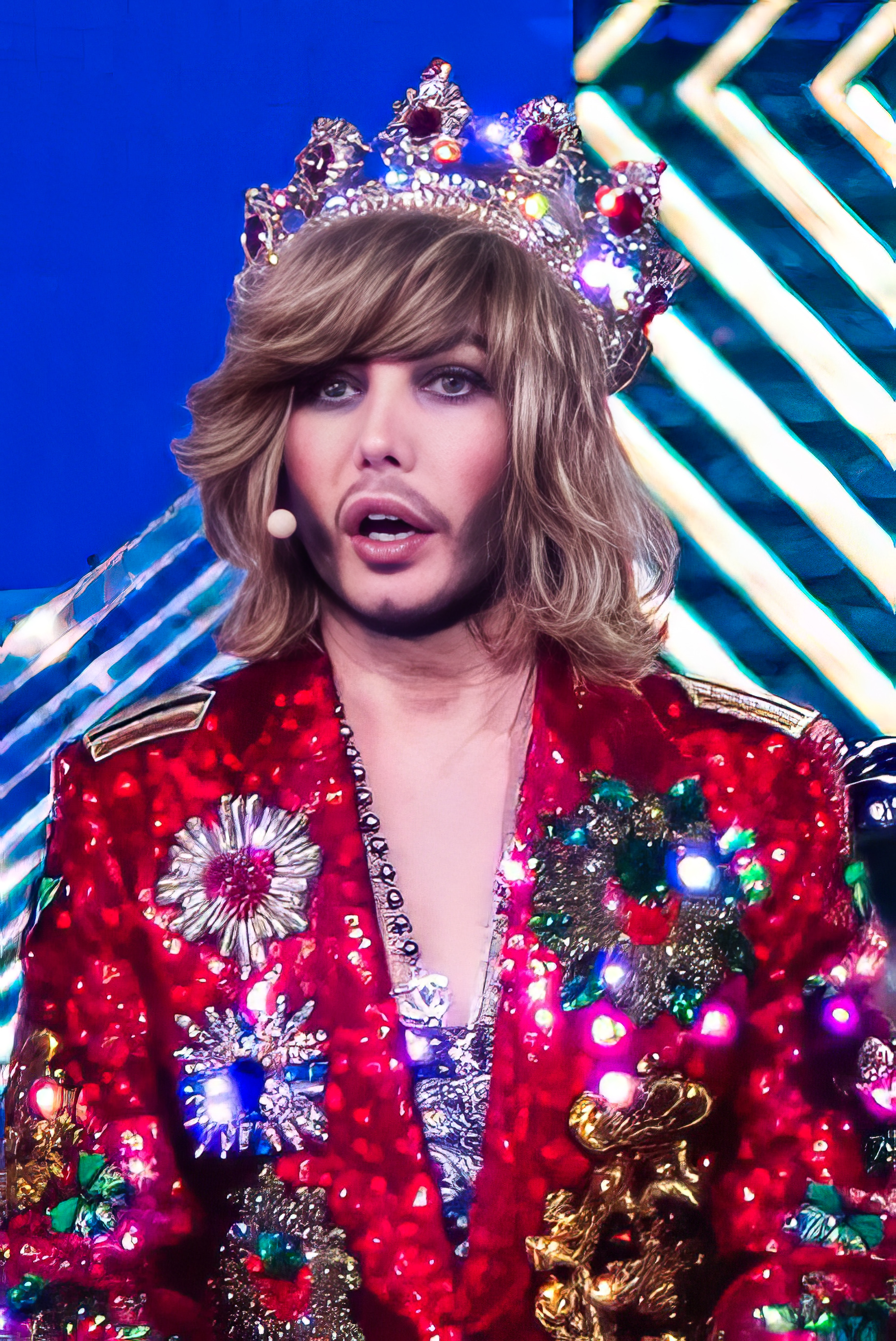
Sergey Zverev appearing on the Russian Television Program "Шоу выходного дня" (The Weekend Show), 2018

Sergey Anatolievich Zverev (Russian: Серге́й Анато́льевич Зве́рев; 19 July 1963, Kultuk, Irkutsk Oblast) is a Russian hairstylist, cosmetic artist, fashion designer and singer. Zverev has appeared on several television shows, including Full Fashion (Muz-TV) Star In the Cube (MTV Russia), and Stars In Fashion (RU.TV).

== Biography ==
Sergey Zverev was born on July 19, 1963, to mother Valentina Timofeevna and father Anatoly Zverev, a railroad mechanic, in the village of Kultuk near Irkutsk (Russia). After Anatoly Zverev's untimely death in a motorcycle crash, the Zverev family moved to Ust-Kamenogorsk (Kazakhstan).

In the 1980s, Zverev served in the Soviet Armed Forces.

Zverev received his education in hairdressing, cosmetic artistry and fashion design in Paris (France). In 1979 Zverev entered the modeling industry.

Tatiana Vedeneyeva was Zverev's first hairdressing client. Other clients have included Alla Pugacheva, Bogdan Titomir, Ksenia Sobchak, Lyudmila Gurchenko, Laima Vaikule, Valery Leontiev, and Irina Ponarovskaya.

Zverev is a colleague of prominent Russian Soviet hairdresser and designer Dolores Kondrashova.

In 2006, it was reported that Zverev had insured his hands for $1 million.

In 2007, Zverev released a doll modeled in his own image, entitled Stylist Sergey Zverev.

2013 saw the release of a single, entitled Soul.

Zverev has one son, born August 25, 1997, named Sergey Zverev Jr.

He now resides in Moscow.

In 2021, Sergey Zverev had announced he would be running in the Duma elections for the Green Party, running in the Buryatia single-member constituency
