= Ust-Orot =

Ust-Orot Усть-Орот
- Selo
- Location within Republic of Buryatia Location within Russia
- Coordinates: 51°58′N 109°46′E
- Country: Russia
- Region: Republic of Buryatia
- District: Kizhinginsky District
- Time zone: UTC+8:00

Ust-Orot (Russian: Усть-Орот) is a rural locality (a selo) in Kizhinginsky District, Republic of Buryatia, Russia. The population was 622 as of 2010. There are 6 streets.

== Geography ==
Ust-Orot is located 18 km northwest of Kizhinga (the district's administrative centre) by road. Kodunsky Stanok is the nearest rural locality.

== Notable people ==
- Gunsyn Tsydenova (1909–1994), politician
