= Tsyren-Dashi Dorzhiev =

Russian politician

Tsyren-Dashi Erdineevich Dorzhiev
- Цыре́н-Даши́ Эрдыне́евич Доржи́ев
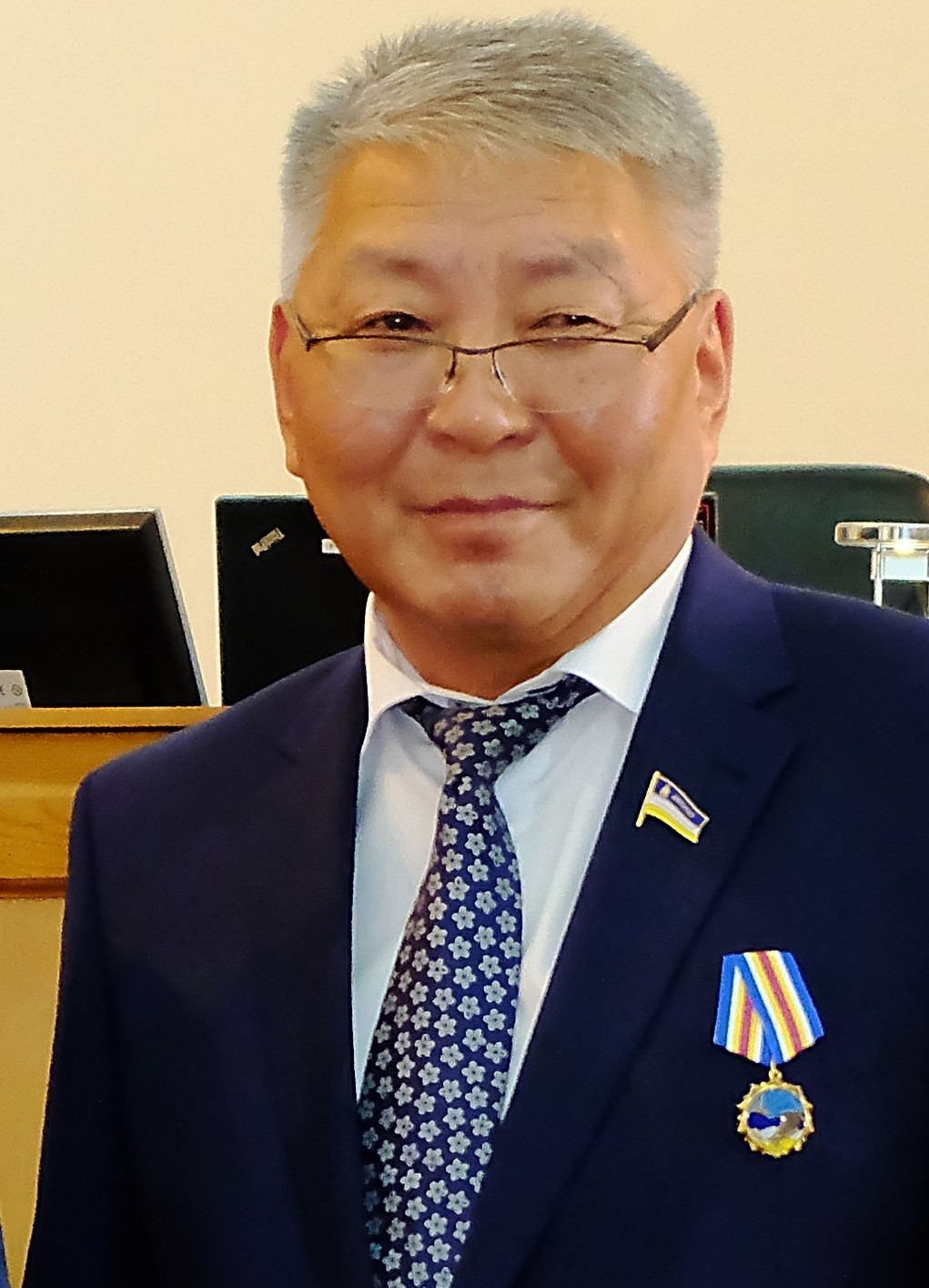

Chairman of the People's Khural of the Republic of Buryatia
- In office August 28, 2015 – September 19, 2018
- President: Vladimir Putin
- Preceded by: Matvey Matveevich Gershevich
- Succeeded by: Vladimir Anatolyevich Pavlov
- Constituency: Republic of Buryatia

Personal details
- Born: 20 April 1962 (age 64) Sosnovo-Ozerskoye, Yeravninsky District, Buryat Autonomous Soviet Socialist Republic
- Party: United Russia
- Awards: Honored Economist of the Russian Federation, Certificate of Honor of the People's Khural of the Republic of Buryatia, Certificate of Honor of the Republic of Buryatia, Agvan Dorzhiev Medal

Tsyren-Dashi Erdineevich Dorzhiev (Buryat: Цыре́н-Даши́ Эрдыне́евич Доржи́ев; born 20 April 1962) is a Russian politician in the Republic of Buryatia. As of the sixth convocation of the People's Khural of the Republic of Buryatia, Dorzhiev is a deputy. Previously, he was the chairman of the People's Khural in its fifth convocation, from August 28, 2015, to September 19, 2018.

== Early career ==
Tsyren-Dashi Erdineevich Dorzhiev was born on April 20, 1962, in the village of Sosnovo-Ozerskoye in the Yervinsky District of the Buryat Autonomous Soviet Socialist Republic. After his graduation from secondary school, he entered the Buryat State Agricultural Academy, then known as the Buryat Agricultural Institute. In 1984, Dorzhiev graduated from the institute with a degree in Zootechnics.

From 1984 to 1987, Dorzhiev worked as a livestock specialist (zootechnician). He was the main livestock specialist of the Sosnovsky State Farm, located in his home district. In 1987, he transferred to work at Komsomol and was elected as Second and then First Secretary of the Eravninsky District Committee of the Komsomol. In 1989, Dorzhiev was appointed director of the Sosnovsky State Farm. From 1991 to 1994, he worked as chairman of the board of the collective farm Ulan-Tuya in Eravninsky district.

== Post-Soviet political career ==
From 1994 to 1999, Dorzhiev was the head of the local government of the Eravninsky District of the Republic of Buryatia. In 1994, Dorzhiev was elected to the first convocation of the People's Khural of the Republic of Buryatia as the representative for the Eravninsky District (constituency No. 8). He has been a deputy of all its convocations. In January 2000, Dorzhiev was elected Chairman of the People's Khural Committee of the Republic of Buryatia on Budget, Taxes, Finances and Banks.

Dorzhiev is a member of the political party United Russia. On August 28, 2015, Dorzhiev was elected Chairman of the fifth convocation of the People's Khural of the Republic of Buryatia in a secret ballot. 36 out of 66 deputies voted for him. In 2018, he was elected as a deputy of the 6th convocation of the People's Khural of the Republic of Buryatia from single-mandate constituency No. 29. He began his term in the 6th convocation on September 19, 2018. He was nominated for the position of Vice Chairman, but was defeated by Bair Zhambalov.

Upon taking office as Chairman, Dorzhiev made this statement about his hopes for the fifth convocation.

Is a situation with fires and droughts a system malfunction? I think it's a system malfunction. [...] I have been a deputy of five convocations and I realize that each convocation has held some kind of advantage. I remember all the chairmen of the People's Khural and how they worked. I think the fifth convocation should work as planned... [...] If they elect me, I will do my best to unite the People's Khural. I promise to be such a [good] chairman every deputy will know that we are fighting for quality.

== Awards ==
- Certificate of Honor of the People's Khural of the Republic of Buryatia (1999)
- Certificate of Honor of the Republic of Buryatia (2003)
- Insignia "Parliament of Russia" (2006)
- Order “For Contribution to the Development of Consumer Cooperation in Russia” (2006)
- Anniversary Medal "350 Years of Voluntary Entry of Buryatia into the Russian State" (2011)
- Medal “180 Years of Consumer Cooperation of the Russian Federation” (2011)
- Medal of Agvan Dorzhiev (2014)
- Honored Worker of the Agricultural Complex of the Republic of Buryatia (1998)
- Honored Economist of the Russian Federation (2008)
