= People's Khural of the Republic of Buryatia =

Regional parliament of Buryatia, Russia

People's Khural of the Republic of Buryatia Буряад Уласай Арадай Хурал Народный хурал Республики Бурятия
- 7th legislature

Type
- Type: Unicameral

Leadership
- Chairman: Vladimir Pavlov since 18 September 2018

Structure
- Seats: 66
- Political groups: United Russia (51); CPRF (7); New People (6); LDPR (2); Independent (1)

Elections
- Voting system: Mixed
- Last election: 10 September 2023
- Next election: 2028

Meeting place
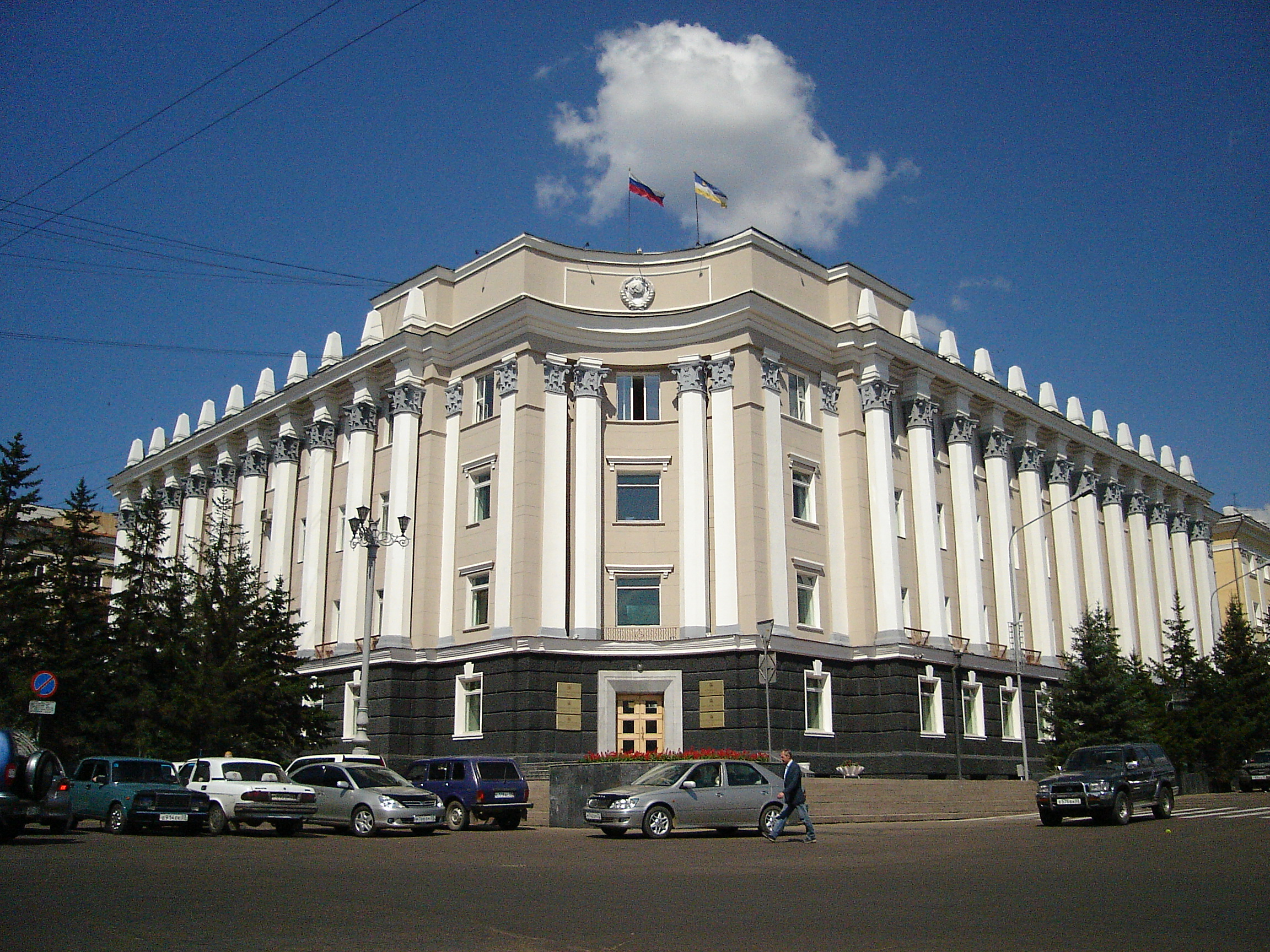
- 9 Sukhe-Batora Street, Ulan-Ude

The People's Khural of the Republic of Buryatia (Russian: Народный хурал Республики Бурятия, romanized: Narodny khural Respubliki Buryatiya; Buryat: Буряад Уласай Арадай Хурал, romanized: Buryaad Ulasay Araday Khural, [burʲˈaːt ulɐˈsæ ɑrɐˈdæ xurˈɑl]) is the regional parliament of Buryatia, a federal subject of Russia. Its 66 deputies are popularly elected every five years. Half of the deputies are elected through a proportional system, and the other half are elected in single-member constituencies with majorities. Independent deputies are self-nominated.

Elections are called by the People's Khural at least three months before the expiration of terms of deputies. Deputies are chosen by the general populace voting for their party's representatives.

The first Chairman of the People's Khural was Mikhail Innokentyevich Semyonov, who is, as of current, the only person to hold the office for two terms in a row.

== History ==
The People's Khural of the Republic of Buryatia was created on July 19, 1994 at the first session of the Khural of the Central Executive Committee of the Buryat ASSR (December 4, 1923 - July 19, 1994). It succeeded the Supreme Council of the Buryat ASSR.

== Structure ==
The People's Khural of Buryatia has six committees:

- The Committee of People's Khural of the Republic of Buryatia on Budget, Taxes, Finance and Banks
- The Committee of People's Khural of the Republic of Buryatia on the State System, Local Self-Government and Law.
- The Committee of People's Khural of the Republic of Buryatia on Land, Agricultural Policy and Consumer Market.
- The Committee of People's Khural of the Republic of Buryatia on International and Regional Relations, National Public Organizations and Religious Associations Affairs.
- The Committee of People's Khural of the Republic of Buryatia on Social Policy.
- The Committee of People's Khural of the Republic of Buryatia on Economic Policy, Natural Resources Utilization and Environmental Protection.

The presiding officer is the Chairman of the People's Khural of Buryatia.

== Elections ==
=== 2018 ===
Party	%	Seats
United Russia	41.01	41
Communist Party of the Russian Federation	25.62	12
Liberal Democratic Party of Russia	12.02	4
A Just Russia	9.49	6
Self-nominated	—	3
Registered voters/turnout	39.44	

=== 2023 ===
Party	%	Seats
United Russia	60.84	51
Communist Party of the Russian Federation	17.08	7
New People	8.29	5
Liberal Democratic Party of Russia	6.16	2
A Just Russia	4.71	0
Independent	—	1
Registered voters/turnout	39.44	

== List of deputies ==
Single-member constituencies

(Most names in the list place the surname first, with the given name placed second and the patronymic placed third)

- Nikolay Dasheyevich Dasheyev (single-member constituency No. 1) United Russia
- Dorzhiyev Gennady Yuryevich (single-member constituency No. 2) United Russia
- Pashinsky Sergey Georgiyevich (single-member constituency No. 3) United Russia
- Budayeva Svetlana Dymbryl-Dorzhiyevna (single-mandate constituency No. 4) United Russia
- Dashinimayev Solbon Sandanovich (single-member constituency No. 5) United Russia
- Tsyrempilov Valery Zhamsuyevich (single-member constituency No. 6) United Russia
- Shvetsov Dmitry Sergeyevich (single-member constituency No. 7) United Russia
- Deyeva Liliya Vasilyevna (single-member constituency No. 8) United Russia
- Tsydenov Alexander Bazarsadayevich (single-member constituency No. 9) Independent
- Kushnaryov Anatoly Grigoryevich (single-mandate constituency No. 10) United Russia
- Noskov Pyotr Lukich (single-member constituency No. 11) United Russia
- Savelyev Alexander Izotovich (single-member constituency No. 12) United Russia
- Krutyan Larisa Nikolayevna (single-member constituency No. 13) United Russia
- Tsyrenov Bair Tsydenovich (single-mandate constituency No. 14) Communist Party
- Badanov Matvey Aleksandrovich (single-member constituency No. 15) United Russia
- Mantatova Tatyana Evgenievna (single-member constituency No. 16) United Russia
- Vakhrameev Innokenty Iosifovich (single-mandate constituency No. 17) Communist Party
- Zybynov Andreyan Gennadyevich (single-member constituency No. 18) United Russia
- Bobkov Igor Alexandrovich (single-member constituency No. 19) United Russia
- Stepanov Mikhail Yuryevich (single-member constituency No. 20) United Russia
- Namsaryaev Namsaray Vladimirovich (single-member constituency No. 21) Independent
- Tsyrenova Ekaterina Dorzhiyevna (single-mandate constituency No. 22) Communist Party
- Tsybikov Bator Bulatovich (single-member constituency No. 23) United Russia
- Gergenov Mikhail Denisovich (single-member constituency No. 24) United Russia
- Igor Markovets (single-member constituency No. 25) United Russia
- Viktor N. Yachmenev (single-member constituency No. 26) Fair Russia
- Druzhinin Dmitry Konstantinovich (single-member constituency No. 27) Independent
- Zhambalov Bair Vladimirovich (single-member constituency No. 28) United Russia
- Tsyren-Dashi Erdineevich Dorzhiev (single-member constituency No. 29) United Russia
- Igor N. Zubarev (single-member constituency No. 30) United Russia
- Garmayev Bair Bazarovich (single-member constituency No. 31) Fair Russia
- Ludupova Yevgenia Yuryevna (single-member constituency No. 32) United Russia
- Bukholtseva Oksana Vasilyevna (single-mandate constituency No. 33) Fair Russia

Unified constituency (proportional voting)

- Bagadayev Alexey Klimentyevich
- Bardunayev Alexander Vladimirovich
- Batuyev Buda-Shirap Chimitovich
- Belykh Leonid Yakovlevich
- Chimbeyev Naydan Danzanovich*
- Pokatsky Vyacheslav Semyonovich
- Vedernikov Vladimir Nikolayevich
- Golyuk Oleg Nikolayevich
- Gershevich Matvey Matveyevich
- Gunzynov Galan Dambiyevich
- Dareyev Galsan Evgenyevich
- Dondokov Tumen Tsyrendashiyevich
- Dorzhiyev Valery Purbuyevich
- Dorosh Sergey Dmitriyevich
- Zhigzhitov Badmadorzho Sodnombalovich
- Zubakov Vasily Georgiyevich
- Ivakhinova Inna Sayanovna
- Kovalyov Anatoly Yefremovich
- Kochnev Valery Grigoryevich
- Krasovsky Leonty Alexandrovich
- Lonshakov Alexander Revevirovich
- Lygdenov Vitaliy Nikolayevich
- Malyshenko Victor Anatolyevich
- Maltsev Victor Vladimirovich
- Matkhanov Irinchey Eduardovich
- Mikhailov Igor Andreyevich
- Olzoyev Yegor Konstantinovich
- Pavlov Vladimir Anatolyevich
- Pashinsky Sergey Mironovich
- Fyodorov Oleg Ivanovich
- Tsybikmitov Zorigto Lubsanovich
- Tsybikov Arkady Damdinovich
- Tsybikov Vyacheslav Borisovich

On October 17, 2019, at a meeting of the Electoral Commission of Buryatia, a decision was made to include Naydan Chimbeyev as a deputy to replace the single-constituency deputy Munko Buyantuyev after he was convicted of smuggling construction materials into China. Buyantuyev lost his parliamentary powers and freed up a place in the Khural.

== See also ==
- List of chairmen of the People's Khural of the Republic of Buryatia
