= Shibertuy =

Shibertuy Шибертуй
- Ulus
- Location within Republic of Buryatia Location within Russia
- Coordinates: 50°47′N 107°52′E
- Country: Russia
- Region: Republic of Buryatia
- District: Bichursky District
- Time zone: UTC+8:00

Shibertuy (Russian: Шибертуй; Buryat: Шэбэртэ, Sheberte) is a rural locality (an ulus) in Bichursky District, Republic of Buryatia, Russia. The population was 1,167 as of 2010. There are 15 streets.

== Geography ==
Shibertuy is located 40 km northeast of Bichura (the district's administrative centre) by road. Dabatuy is the nearest rural locality.
