= Nikolai Buduyev =

Russian politician

Nikolai Buduyev MP
- Николай Будуев
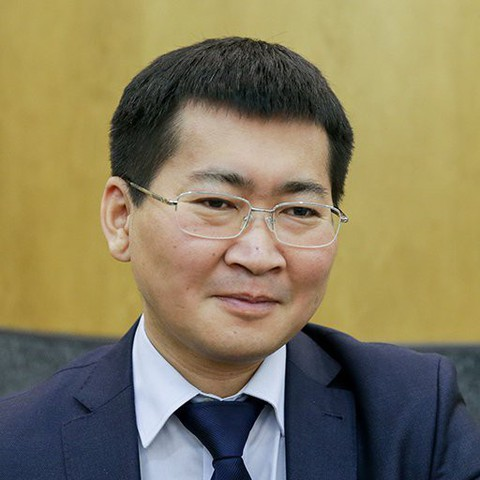

Member of the State Duma (Party List Seat)
- Incumbent
- Assumed office 5 October 2016

Personal details
- Born: 24 March 1974 (age 52) Ulan-Ude, Buryat ASSR, Russian SFSR, USSR
- Party: United Russia
- Education: Buryat State University

Nikolai Robertovich Buduyev (Note: Also transliterated Nikolay Robertovich Buduev) (Russian: Николай Робертович Будуев; born 24 March 1974, Ulan-Ude) is a Russian political figure, deputy of the 7th and 8th State Dumas. In 1996 he graduated from the Buryat State University. In 1998, he was hired as a consultant to the Committee on Public Information of the Presidential Administration and the Government of the Republic of Buryatia. In 2006, he became an assistant to Vasily Kuznetsov who was at that time the deputy of the State Duma of the 4th convocation. In 2010, he was appointed head of the information and analytical center of the administration of Ulan-Ude. In 2012 he became the director of the only publishing house in Buryatia that publishes Moskovskij Komsomolets, the major news outlet in the region. He was also assigned an editor chief of the newspaper

Since September 2021, he has served as a deputy of the 8th State Duma convocation.

He is one of the members of the State Duma the United States Treasury sanctioned on 24 March 2022 in response to the 2022 Russian invasion of Ukraine.
