= Mikhail Semyonov (politician) =

Russian politician

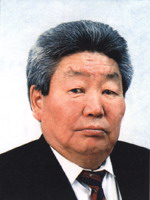

Chairman of the People's Khural of the Republic of Buryatia
- In office 21 July 1994 – 23 June 2002
- Preceded by: Leonid Potapov (as Chairman of the Supreme Council of the Republic of Buryatia)
- Succeeded by: Aleksandr Lubsanov

Personal details
- Born: 26 November 1938 Korsungai, Nukutsky District, Irkutsk Oblast, Russian SFSR, Soviet Union
- Died: 18 October 2019 (aged 80) Ulan-Ude, Buryatia, Russia
- Education: Irkutsk Mining and Metallurgical Institute
- Awards: Order of Honour; Order of the Red Banner of Labour; Medal "Veteran of Labour"

Mikhail Innokentyevich Semyonov (Russian: Михаил Иннокентьевич Семёнов, 26 November 1938 – 18 October 2019) was a Soviet and Russian industrialist and politician.

Born into a mining and machinist family in Irkutsk Oblast during the period of Soviet rule, Semyonov studied at Irkutsk Mining and Metallurgical Institute, specialising in mining, and beginning a career in industry, at first as a mine engineer, and later at a tungsten-molybdenum plant in Buryatia, eventually rising to the position of head of the enterprise. He entered politics in the 1980s, sitting as a deputy of the Supreme Soviet of the Soviet Union, before becoming deputy chairman of the Council of Ministers of Buryatia. After the dissolution of the Soviet Union he was elected three times as a deputy of the People's Khural of the Republic of Buryatia, and spent two terms as the Khural's chairman. During this period he oversaw the establishment of the republic's post-Soviet laws and structures, and a number of important economic developments.

In 1999, Semyonov was elected Chairman of the Inter-Parliamentary Council of Legislative Bodies of State Power of the Agin-Buryat Autonomous Okrug, the Republic of Buryatia and the Ust-Orda Buryat Autonomous Okrug, Between 1996 and 2001 he sat on the Federation Council as representative of Buryatia. In retirement he served as an adviser to the Khural's chairman. Over his career he received a number of awards and honours, including the Order of Honour, the Order of the Red Banner of Labour, and the Medal "Veteran of Labour". He held honorary citations from the State Duma and the Federation Council, and the honorary titles of "Honoured Engineer of the Buryat Autonomous Soviet Socialist Republic" and "Honoured Citizen of the Republic of Buryatia".

== Early life and career in industry ==
Mikhail Semyonov was born on 26 November 1938 in the village of Korsungai, in Nukutsky District, Irkutsk Oblast. He was one of the eight children, and four sons, of Innokenty Maraktayevich, a machine operator, and Anfisa Andreevna, a party member and activist. Two of Mikhail's brothers became miners. Mikhail Semyonov graduated from the Irkutsk Mining and Metallurgical Institute in 1960 with a degree in mining engineering and went to work in the Chita Oblast as an engineer, and then as the chief engineer at the Darasunsky mine administration of the Transbaikalzoloto trust. In 1965 he moved to Buryatia to work at the Dzhidinsky tungsten-molybdenum plant, where over a 28-year period he rose from the position of mining foreman to the head of the enterprise in 1980.

== Political career ==
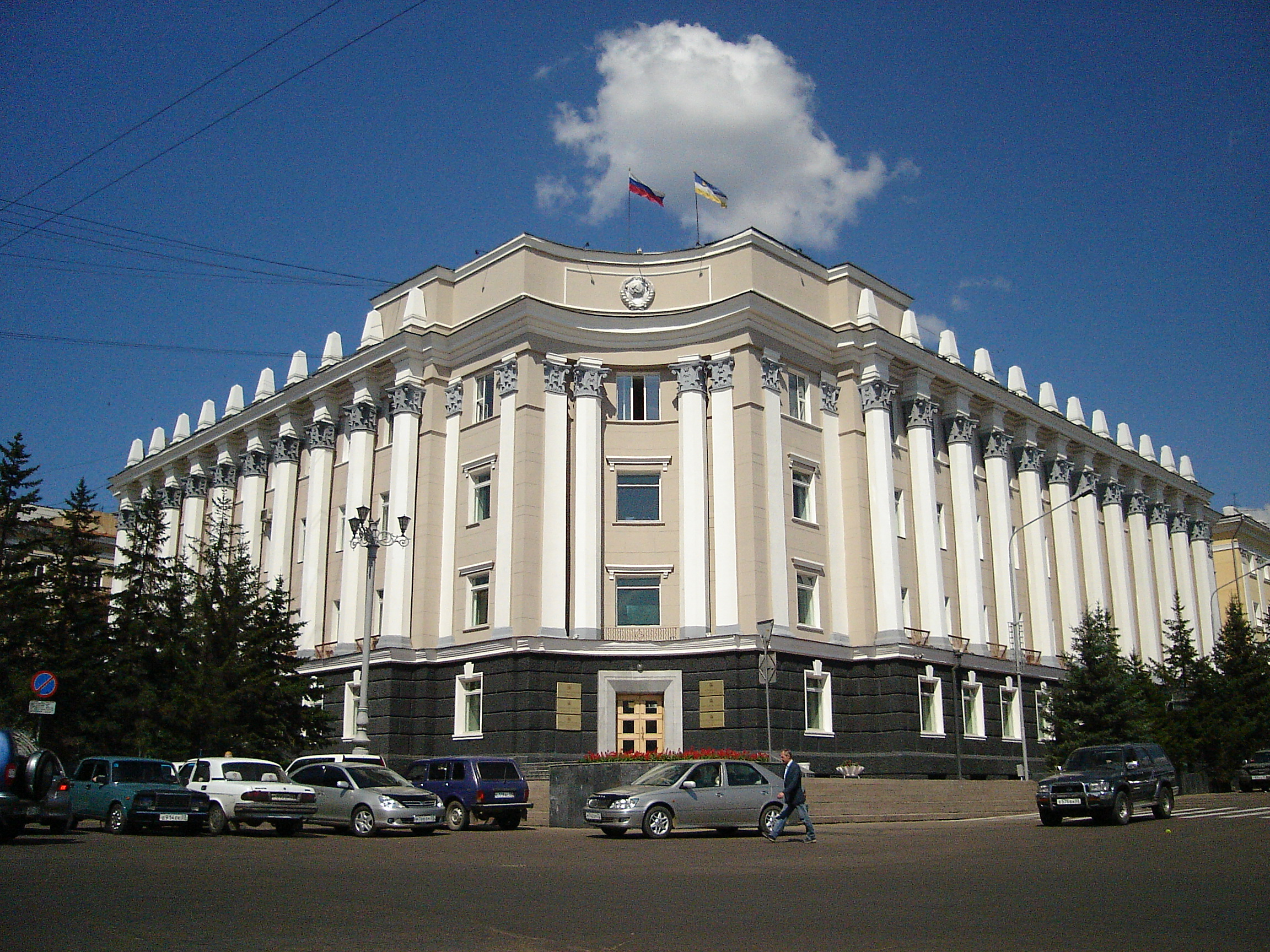
The building of the People's Khural of the Republic of Buryatia. Semyonov was a deputy for three terms, and its chairman for two.

Semyonov was elected deputy of the Supreme Soviet of the Soviet Union, sitting in the 11th convocation between 1984 and 1988 as representative of Okinsky, Tunkinsky and Zakamensky Districts, and in 1988 he was nominated deputy chairman of the Council of Ministers of Buryatia. After the dissolution of the Soviet Union he was elected three times as a deputy of the People's Khural of the Republic of Buryatia for Zakamensky District, the first on 30 June 1994, and on 21 July 1994 he was elected to the first of two terms as its chairman, during its first and second convocations. These were particularly significant terms, as it was during the first and second convocations of the Khural that many of the basic laws and state structures of the Republic were codified and enacted. He was elected as deputy for the second time on 5 July 1998, and began his second term as chairman on 20 July that year.

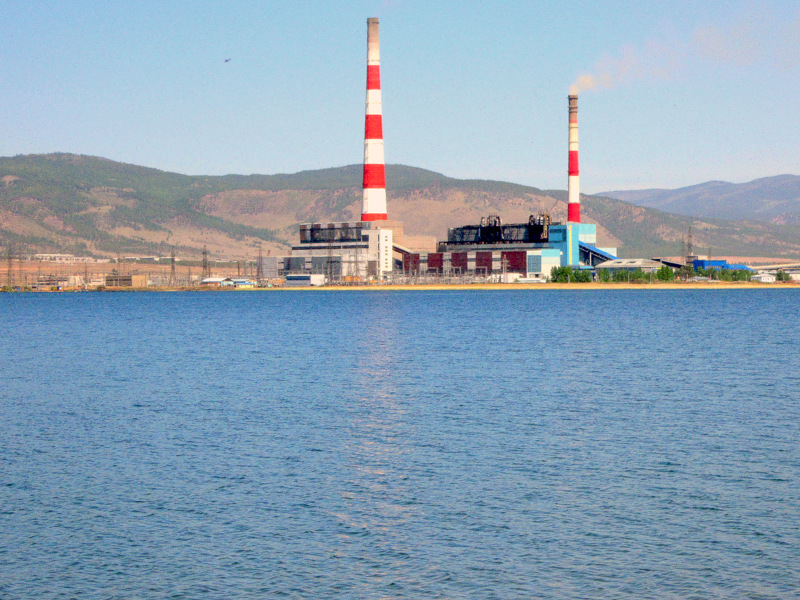
The Gusinoozyorskaya power station, one of several economic projects developed during Semyonov's tenure.

Semyonov oversaw several initiatives to strengthen Buryatia's economic standing, such as the building of Ulan-Ude thermal power station-2, and the fourth power unit of the Gusinoozyorskaya power station. Other industrial and economic developments included the construction of the Tugnuysky coal mine, the LEP-500 main power transmission line between Irkutsk and Gusinoozyorsk, 150 km of paved road between Mondy and Orlik, and a new telephone exchange in Ulan-Ude. He also participated in the development of a state-owned gold mining enterprise, which later became Buryatzoloto.

On 10 March 1999 Semyonov was elected Chairman of the Inter-Parliamentary Council of Legislative Bodies of State Power of the Agin-Buryat Autonomous Okrug, the Republic of Buryatia and the Ust-Orda Buryat Autonomous Okrug. From January 1996 to December 2001 Semyonov sat on the Federation Council as representative of Buryatia. He sat on several of the Council's committees during his tenure, firstly on the Committee on Budget, Financial, Currency and Credit Regulation, Money Issues, Tax Policy and Customs Regulation from January to February 1996, and from February 1996 as the Deputy Chairman of Committee on Social Policy. In 2002 he began his third term as a deputy of the People's Khural, serving during its third convocation until 2007. In retirement he served as an adviser to the Khural's chairman.

Semyonov died on 18 October 2019 at the age of 80 after a long illness. A memorial ceremony was held on 20 October at the building of the Buryat State Philharmonic.

== Awards and family ==
Over his career in industry and politics, Semyonov received a number of awards and tokens of recognition. He was awarded the Order of Honour, the Order of the Red Banner of Labour, and the Medal "Veteran of Labour". He had also received an honorary citation from the State Duma for his work "in the Development of Parliamentarism", and a similar citation from the Federation Council. He had been awarded the degree of candidate of legal sciences, and had the honorary title of "Honoured Engineer of the Buryat Autonomous Soviet Socialist Republic". In an Ukase dated 25 June 2014 the Head of the Republic of Buryatia awarded Semyonov the title of "Honoured Citizen of the Republic of Buryatia". He was married to Antonina Anatolyevna, and had two sons: Andrei and Yuri, and a daughter, Marina.
