= Vladimir Pavlov (politician, born 1956) =

Buryat politician

- Владимир Павлов
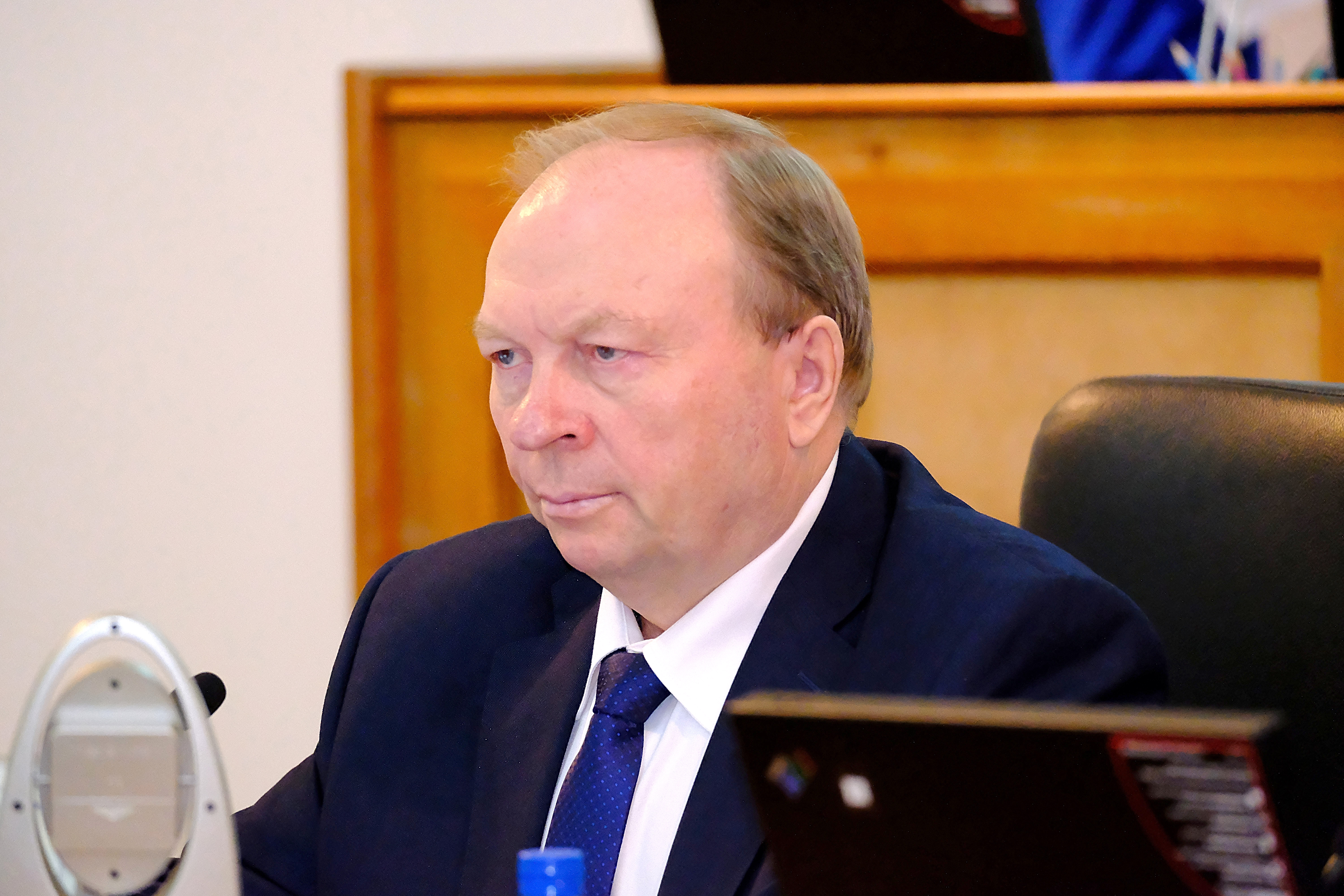
- Pavlov in 2017

Chairman of the People's Khural of the Republic of Buryatia
- Incumbent
- Assumed office September 19th, 2018
- President: Vladimir Putin
- Preceded by: Tsyren-Dashi Erdineevich Dorzhiev
- Constituency: Republic of Buryatia

Personal details
- Born: May 6, 1956 (age 69) Shibertuy, Bichursky District, Buryat Autonomous Soviet Socialist Republic
- Party: United Russia
- Awards: Medal "For Work in Agriculture"

Vladimir Anatolyevich Pavlov (Russian: Владимир Анатольевич Павлов; born May 6, 1956) is a Russian politician in the Republic of Buryatia. He is the Chairman of the People's Khural of the Republic of Buryatia, brought into office in its 6th convocation on September 19, 2018. Although Pavlov is of Russian ethnicity, he can speak the Buryat language fluently.

== Early life ==
Pavlov was born on May 6, 1956, in Shibertuy ulus, in the Bichursky District of the Buryat Autonomous Soviet Socialist Republic. After graduating from high school, he entered the Buryat Agricultural Institute, from which he graduated in 1978 with a degree in mechanical engineering. He began his career as Chief Engineer of the Novosretensky State Farm, where he worked until 1987. In 1987, he was appointed director of the Novosretensky State Farm. From 1994 to 2002, he worked as the Chairman of the Novosretensky Agricultural Production Cooperative. He was elected as a deputy of the District Council of Deputies at its 3rd convocation.

== Political career ==
=== Deputy in the People's Khural ===
Pavlov was elected as a deputy of the People's Khural of the Republic of Buryatia during its 2nd, 3rd and 4th convocations. In 2002 and 2007, he was elected Chairman of the Committee of the People's Khural of the Republic of Buryatia on Land Issues, Agricultural Policy and the Consumer Market, one of the leading committees of the People's Khural of the Republic of Buryatia. As chairman of the committee, he initiated the adoption of more than 30 laws in Buryatia for the socioeconomic development of the republic.

From October 2005 to August 2007, Pavlov was Chairman of the Buryat Regional Branch of the Agrarian Party of Russia. In December 2008, he was elected secretary of the Buryatia Regional Branch of United Russia.

=== Chairman of the People's Khural ===
On September 9, 2018, deputies of the 6th convocation of the People's Khural of the Republic of Buryatia were elected. United Russia politician Bair Zhambalov proposed to nominate Pavlov for chairman. On September 19, 2018, at the first parliamentary meeting of the 6th convocation of the People's Khural of the Republic of Buryatia, Pavlov was elected Chairman of the People's Khural by a vote of 45 to 18. A total of 64 deputies out of 66 deputies in the People's Khural voted. Pavlov was the only candidate and other parties did not nominate any candidates. After his election, Pavlov thanked the deputies for their confidence. He was given letters of gratitude and thanks from the administration of the Bichursky District, the government of the Republic of Buryatia, the People's Khural of the Republic of Buryatia, and the State Duma of the Federal Assembly of the Russian Federation.

As he took office, he announced the plan for the next 5 years of his term, focusing on supporting agriculture, orphans and a number of other issues. During his speech, he stated that:

The parliament of the sixth convocation faces tasks of great importance. In the economic sphere, the most relevant one for us is the adoption of a strategy for socioeconomic development until 2035. Regular support of the strategy will become an important task for the entire period of work for the sixth convocation. The main goal is to increase the republic's income by creating a highly competitive economic structure as the basis for subsequent sustainable social and economic growth, while taking into account environmental restrictions that are set forth in our legislation. We also have to adopt at the legislative level a law on the innovation management system in the republic and conclude agreements with federal authorities and large private corporations on the coordination of events.

== Awards and titles ==
- Honored Worker of Agriculture of the Republic of Buryatia (1993)
- Medal "For Work in Agriculture" (2006, awarded by Vladimir Putin)
