= Gennady Laletin =

Russian serial killer

- Born: Gennady Vladimirovich Laletin; 13 June 1957 (age 69); Khasurta, Buryat ASSR, RSFSR
- Other names: "Gena the Worm" "Gena the Refrigerator"
- Convictions: Murder x5 Attempted murder x2 Child sexual abuse
- Penalty: Life imprisonment (murders); 5 years imprisonment (child sexual abuse)

Details
- Victims: 5
- Span of crimes: 2004–2010
- Country: Russia
- State: Buryatia
- Date apprehended: 21 October 2015

Gennady Vladimirovich Laletin (Russian: Геннадий Владимирович Лалетин; born 13 June 1957), known as Gena the Worm (Russian: Гена-червяк), is a Russian serial killer and rapist. Originally indicted in 1998 for the rape of his stepdaughter in Buryatia, Laletin became a fugitive and committed additional crimes from 2004 to 2010, including five murders.

Arrested in 2015, he later confessed to all respective crimes, for which he was tried, convicted, and sentenced to life imprisonment.

== Early life and first crime ==
Gennady Vladimirovich Laletin was born on 13 June 1957, in the village of Khasurta, Buryat ASSR. Little is known about his early life, but at one point during his adulthood, he married a woman who had one daughter from a previous marriage. By profession, he worked as a repairman for refrigeration equipment.

On 12 October 1998, while engaged in a drunken quarrel with his wife, an intoxicated Laletin raped his 14-year-old stepdaughter at knifepoint in front of her mother. He then fled the house and was designated a wanted fugitive by local authorities. In an attempt to evade arrest, Laletin began living on the streets of Ulan-Ude, sometimes moving to different regions of the republic. He eventually settled in a little hut on the banks of the Selenga, where he made a living by trading and repairing household appliances. Laletin, who used different aliases, was known to locals simply as "Gena the Worm", due to the fact that he would dig up earthworms from Bogorodsky Island and then sell them to local fishermen.

=== Murders ===
Most of Laletin's victims were either his employers or acquaintances and all of them were killed during drunken quarrels. The crimes took place all across Buryatia, including the villages of Taltsy, Mostovaya, Petukhovka, Klyuyevka, Sagan-Nur, and the regional capital of Ulan-Ude. In most of the crimes, Laletin did not steal anything from his victims, except for two occasions on which he stole household items and sold them for alcohol.

Little is publicly available about Laletin's victims. His first reported murder dates back to 2004 when he stabbed a woman to death near a meat processing plant. He reportedly stabbed her more than 20 times, then set the body on fire.

His next two victims were killed in 2009 in the Mukhorshibirsky District, with one being a young man who was stabbed to death with a shiv while collecting food left on tombstones from the local cemetery. A year later, Laletin killed two more victims on two separate occasions - one in the Kabansky District and another in Ulan-Ude.

== Arrest ==
On 2 July 2015, he stabbed a married couple who had taken him in. Despite both suffering injuries to the chest, they survived and later told the authorities how they came across him. According to the woman, she and her husband went to visit her elderly mother only to find her drunk and in the presence of a stranger. When asked, the elderly woman said that she had met him on the street and later agreed to sell her refrigerator at a pawn shop so they could buy some alcohol. Angered, the husband threatened to call the police, whereupon the man went to the kitchen, then came back and attempted to leave. When the husband attempted to stop him, the stranger took out a knife he had hidden in his sleeve and stabbed him, then attacked the wife, stabbing her twice as well. Both lost consciousness and the attacker, believing them to be dead, quickly fled.

On 21 October, Laletin was arrested at the house of an acquaintance in Ulan-Ude and on the following day he confessed to his previous crimes in full.

== Trial and sentence ==
In March 2017, the Supreme Court of Buryatia sentenced Laletin to five years imprisonment on the outstanding charge of child sexual abuse and, later on, a full life sentence for the five murders and two attempted murders. Laletin became enraged after hearing the verdict, and when a journalist attempted to take a picture of him he removed one of his sneakers and threw it at her, hitting her in the head. He was then accosted by guards and immediately escorted out of the courtroom, shouting obscenities and claiming that the court had "made a clown out of [him]".

== See also ==
- List of Russian serial killers
