= Mayla =

Mayla Майла
- Settlement
- Location within Republic of Buryatia Location within Russia
- Coordinates: 52°30′N 110°00′E
- Country: Russia
- Region: Republic of Buryatia
- District: Khorinsky District
- Time zone: UTC+8:00

Mayla (Russian: Майла) is a rural locality (a settlement) in Khorinsky District, Republic of Buryatia, Russia. The population was 337 as of 2010. There are 9 streets.

== Geography ==
Mayla is located 53 km north of Khorinsk (the district's administrative centre) by road. Alan is the nearest rural locality.
