= Kulsk =

Kulsk Кульск
- Selo
- Location within Republic of Buryatia Location within Russia
- Coordinates: 52°07′N 109°37′E
- Country: Russia
- Region: Republic of Buryatia
- District: Khorinsky District
- Time zone: UTC+8:00

Kulsk (Russian: Кульск) is a rural locality (a selo) in Khorinsky District, Republic of Buryatia, Russia. The population was 173 as of 2010. There are 6 streets.

== Geography ==
Kulsk is located 16 km west of Khorinsk (the district's administrative centre) by road. Kulsky Stanok is the nearest rural locality.
