= Mogoy =

Mogoy Могой
- Selo
- Location within Republic of Buryatia Location within Russia
- Coordinates: 52°27′N 109°07′E
- Country: Russia
- Region: Republic of Buryatia
- District: Khorinsky District
- Time zone: UTC+8:00

Mogoy (Russian: Могой) is a rural locality (a selo) in Khorinsky District, Republic of Buryatia, Russia. The population was 26 as of 2010. There is 1 street.

== Geography ==
Mogoy is located 107 km northwest of Khorinsk (the district's administrative centre) by road. Tokhoryukta is the nearest rural locality.
