= Galina Shoidagbaeva =

Russian opera singer

Galina Shoidagbaeva (Russian: Гали́на Бадмажа́повна Шойдагба́ева; born in 1953) is a Buryat Soviet and Russian opera soprano and teacher. She was awarded People's Artist of the USSR (1990).

== Early life ==
Galina Shojdagbaeva was born on July 5, 1953, in the village of Sosnovo-Ozerskoe (Yeravninsky District, Republic of Buryatia).

After graduating from high school, Shoydagbaeva entered Tchaikovsky Music School in the class of People's Artist of the RSFSR N. Petrova. In 1980 she graduated from the Leningrad Rimsky-Korsakov Conservatory in the class of T. Novichenko.

== Career ==
In 1980 she became soloist of the Buryat Opera and Ballet Theater. She performs solo concerts.

In 1988 she became a teacher at the Tchaikovsky Ulan-Ude Music College.

Shoydgbaeva is a professor at the East Siberian State Academy of Culture and Arts, where in 1993 the vocal department was opened. She chairs the solo singing department.

== Operas ==
- "Aida" by G. Verdi - Aida
- "Othello" by G. Verdi - Desdemona
- "Troubadour" by G. Verdi - Leonora
- "Cio-Cio-San" G. Puccini - Madame Butterfly
- "Tosca" by G. Puccini - Tosca
- Turandot by G. Puccini - Turandot
- "Prince Igor" P. Borodin - Yaroslavna
- "Iolanta" by P. Tchaikovsky - Iolanthe
- "The Queen of Spades" by P. Tchaikovsky - Lisa
- "Carmen" by G. Bizet - Mikaela
- "Enkh-Bulat bator" Markian Frolov - Arjun-Goohon
- "Geser" A. Andreev - Urmai-Gokhon khatan
- "Gala concert" by the Buryatia State Academic Tsydynzhapov Opera and Ballet Theatre

== See also ==
Buryatia
