= Verkhniye Taltsy =

Verkhniye Taltsy Верхние Тальцы
- Selo
- Location within Republic of Buryatia Location within Russia
- Coordinates: 52°02′N 108°55′E
- Country: Russia
- Region: Republic of Buryatia
- District: Khorinsky District
- Time zone: UTC+8:00

Verkhniye Taltsy (Russian: Верхние Тальцы) is a rural locality (a selo) in Khorinsky District, Republic of Buryatia, Russia. The population was 1,100 as of 2010. There are 15 streets.

== Geography ==
Verkhniye Taltsy is located 71 km west of Khorinsk (the district's administrative centre) by road. Khandagay is the nearest rural locality.
