= Naryn, Khorinsky District, Republic of Buryatia =

Naryn Нарын
- Settlement
- Location within Republic of Buryatia Location within Russia
- Coordinates: 52°04′N 109°18′E
- Country: Russia
- Region: Republic of Buryatia
- District: Khorinsky District
- Time zone: UTC+8:00

Naryn (Russian: Нарын; Buryat: Нарин, Narin) is a rural locality (a settlement) in Khorinsky District, Republic of Buryatia, Russia. The population was 171 as of 2010. There are two streets.

== Geography ==
Naryn is located 44 km west of Khorinsk (the district's administrative centre) by road. Tarbagatay is the nearest rural locality.
