= Oninoborsk =

Oninoborsk Ониноборск
- Selo
- Location within Republic of Buryatia Location within Russia
- Coordinates: 52°15′N 110°01′E
- Country: Russia
- Region: Republic of Buryatia
- District: Khorinsky District
- Time zone: UTC+8:00

Oninoborsk (Russian: Ониноборск) is a rural locality (a selo) situated in Khorinsky District, Republic of Buryatia, Russia. The population was 308 as of 2010. There are 6 streets.

== Geography ==
Oninoborsk is located 21 km northeast of Khorinsk (the district's administrative centre) by road. Bulum is the nearest rural locality.
