= Oybont =

Oybont Ойбонт
- Settlement
- Location within Republic of Buryatia Location within Russia
- Coordinates: 52°29′N 109°12′E
- Country: Russia
- Region: Republic of Buryatia
- District: Khorinsky District
- Time zone: UTC+8:00

Oybont (Russian: Ойбонт) is a rural locality (a settlement) in Khorinsky District, Republic of Buryatia, Russia. The population was 71 as of 2010. There is 1 street.

== Geography ==
Oybont is located 115 km northwest of Khorinsk (the district's administrative centre) by road. Tokhoryukta is the nearest rural locality.
