= Tegda =

Tegda Тэгда
- Selo
- Location within Republic of Buryatia Location within Russia
- Coordinates: 52°23′N 108°55′E
- Country: Russia
- Region: Republic of Buryatia
- District: Khorinsky District
- Time zone: UTC+8:00

Tegda (Russian: Тэгда; Buryat: Тээгдэ, Teegde) is a rural locality (a selo) in Khorinsky District, Republic of Buryatia, Russia. The population was 1,756 as of 2010. There are 29 streets.

== Geography ==
The selo is located 90 km northwest of the regional center, the village of Khorinsk, on the left bank of the Kurba River, at the confluence of its left tributary, the Tegda River.

== History ==
Founded in 1928 by the decision of the land cultivation partnership (TOZ). In 1929, an agricultural commune was formed. In 1932, the Shene Azhal (New Labor) agricultural artel was created, later a collective farm. In 1939, the Kurbinsky timber industry enterprise was founded. In 1961, the Kurbinsky state farm was formed.

== Famous people ==
- Nikifor Samsonovich Afanasyev (1910-1980) - Hero of the Soviet Union, participant in the Great Patriotic War. Lived and worked in Tegda. He was buried in the local cemetery. One of the streets of the village is named after N. S. Afanasyev.
- Dambaev Georgy Shoenovich (1937-1985) - director of the Kurbinsky state farm from 1967 to 1978.
