= Anatoliy Andreyev =

Buryat composer (1941–2004)

- Born: 10 April 1941 ulan-Ude, Buryat ASSR, Soviet Union
- Died: 2004 (aged 62–63); Ulan-Ude, Buryatia, Russia
- Education: Urals Mussorgsky State Conservatoire
- Occupations: Composer, educator, music, director
- Years active: 1970–2004
- Known for: Anthem of the Republic of Buryatia

Anatoliy Andreyevich Andreyev (Russian: Анато́лий Андре́евич Андре́ев; 10 April 1941 – 23 September 2004) was a Buryat composer of classical music. In 1995, he composed the music for the Anthem of the Republic of Buryatia, with lyrics by Damba Zhalsarayev.

== Career ==
Andreyev was educated at the Urals Mussorgsky State Conservatoire, graduating in 1969 with a degree in composition. He was a prolific composer; his works include numerous popular songs, oratorios, cantatas, and the ballet Poet's Song (1984). Andreyev is renowned for his melodic compositions. The National Anthem of Buryatia was initially conceived as a song dedicated to Buryatia, "Our Native Land" ("Песня о родной земле"); it won the state competition for the national anthem, being written into the respective 1995 law.

Andreyev dedicated a considerable portion of his career to the Buryat national heritage. One of the composer's last works was the opera Geser (2002) in the Buryat language, based on the Buryat epic of the same name (see Epic of King Gesar). The opera premiered in March 2004 at the Buryat National Opera.

Andreyev's career included teaching positions at musical institutions of higher learning in Buryatia where he taught composition. He was also the music director of Theatre ''Baikal'', the national theatre of folk music and dance in Ulan-Ude. His contributions to the Buryat culture were officially recognised with the titles of Meritorious Artist of the Buryat Republic and that of Russia, while his songs and ballads continue to be popular to this day.

== See also ==
- Music of Buryatia
