= Bulum =

Bulum Булум
- Ulus
- Location within Republic of Buryatia Location within Russia
- Coordinates: 52°16′N 110°06′E
- Country: Russia
- Region: Republic of Buryatia
- District: Khorinsky District
- Time zone: UTC+8:00

Bulum (Russian: Булум) is a rural locality (an ulus) in Khorinsky District, Republic of Buryatia, Russia. The population was 352 as of 2010. There are 7 streets.

== Geography ==
Bulum is located 28 km northeast of Khorinsk (the district's administrative centre) by road. Oninoborsk is the nearest rural locality.
