= Sannomysk =

Sannomysk Санномыск
- Selo
- Location within Republic of Buryatia Location within Russia
- Coordinates: 52°07′N 109°24′E
- Country: Russia
- Region: Republic of Buryatia
- District: Khorinsky District
- Time zone: UTC+8:00

Sannomysk (Russian: Санномыск) is a rural locality (a selo) in Khorinsky District, Republic of Buryatia, Russia. The population was 408 as of 2010. There are 24 streets.

== Geography ==
Sannomysk is located 30 km west of Khorinsk (the district's administrative centre) by road. Naryn is the nearest rural locality.
