= Malaya Kurba =

Malaya Kurba Малая Курба
- Settlement
- Location within Republic of Buryatia Location within Russia
- Coordinates: 52°39′N 109°31′E
- Country: Russia
- Region: Republic of Buryatia
- District: Khorinsky District
- Time zone: UTC+8:00

Malaya Kurba (Russian: Малая Курба; Buryat: Бага Хурбэ, Baga Khurbe) is a rural locality (a settlement) in Khorinsky District, Republic of Buryatia, Russia. The population was 60 as of 2010. There are 2 streets.

== Geography ==
Malaya Kurba is located 143 km north of Khorinsk (the district's administrative centre) by road. Tokhoryukta is the nearest rural locality.
