= Dodo-Gol =

Village in Khorinsky District, Republic of Buryatia, Russia

Dodo-Gol (Buryat: Доодо гол, Doodo gol; Russian: Додо-Гол, Dodo-Gol) is a village located in the Khorinsky District of Buryatia.

== Etymology ==
Dodo-Gol translates from Buryat as "lower valley".

== History ==
It was established as a permanent settlement during the period when nomadic Buryat tribes began transitioning to a more settled way of life, influenced by Russian expansion into Siberia and subsequent administrative changes.

Dodo-Gol belonged to the Khorinsky District (until 1936)

Prior to the Soviet Union's foundation in 1922, the village was located along the Uda River. 50 families resided in the village. They would live approximately 200-300 meters from each other. Each family kept cattle, sheep, and horses. The area was agricultural based with each family owning a large plot of land for arable farming and hayfields. The families engaged in livestock breeding and agricultural production. During the summer, they migrated to summer camps located in five different locations east of their winter quarters, where they lived until late autumn. When autumn arose, they migrated to their winter quarters.

With the foundation of the Soviet Union (1922) and the establishment of soviet power within the region in 1923, the Toz-Gol agricultural cooperative was formed in Dodo-Gol, and in 1930, the Osoviakhim cooperative was established. The first chairman of the Osoviakhim cooperative was Badmaev Gympyl, followed by Tsydyp Tsyrenov, Budazhap Zhanaev, Prokopiy Pronin, and Bolkhosho Babudaev.

In 1933, when families continued to live separately, there was a major flood, after which all the Dodogoltsy migrated to a new location north of their previous homes and formed one village, where they currently live.

Dodo-Gol was handed over to the control of the Zaigraevsky District from 1936-1961.

In 1939, the artel was transformed into the "Defense of the USSR" collective farm, with Dondok Badmaevich Badmayev appointed chairman. With the formation of the collective farm, the first HTZ tractors and Kommunar combines from the Kurbinsky MTS began to appear in the village. The first "Polutorka" machine appeared in the village.

The local craftsmen - the first machine operators and farmers, the darkhans - became renowned throughout the Khorin Valley. Metal was forged in the forge. Mills, a forge, a threshing floor all became were part of their collective farm.

In December 1940, settlers from Tatarstan arrived in the village. There were 10 families. The population of Dodo-Gol grew and changed.

When the Great Patriotic War began, Dodogol residents were called up one after another to the front. Forty-five men went to war, of whom 28 sons of Dodo-Gol died defending their homeland.

Elderly people, women, and teenagers remained to work at the "Defense of the USSR" collective farm. Led by chairman Dondok Badmaevich Badmayev, the collective farm was engaged in livestock breeding and agriculture. The entire population worked under the motto, "Everything for the front, everything for Victory." They worked from early morning until late at night at the livestock camps, raising cattle for meat and milking. In the fields of Khundui, they grew wheat, harvested the harvest down to the last grain, prepared animal feed, and made hay. In the winter, they tended the cattle. Ochirov Chimitsyren, a widower with many children, worked in the forge. He was an indispensable blacksmith, darkhan, and hunter: he made plows for plowing with his own hands, repaired all the equipment, and provided meat for all the village residents. Women, Darima Zhamsueva and Khandama Rakshaeva, took the wheel of the "iron horse"—the tractor. The teenagers worked preparing and transporting feed on horses and preparing firewood for the tractor.

The work of the Dodogol workers during the war was recognized with government awards: the Order of the Red Banner of Labor was awarded to the foreman of the tractor-field brigade, Tsydyp Dashievich Dymbrylov, and the Order of Lenin was awarded to team leader Tsyren-Dorzhi Ochirovich Chimitov. The medal "For Valiant and Selfless Labor during the Great Patriotic War" was awarded to the chairman of the collective farm, Dondok Badmaevich Badmayev, the blacksmith, Chimitsyren Ochirov, and many women workers in the home front: Tsypilma Ayurzhanaeva, Khandama Bazarovna Rakshaeva, Darima Ochirovna Zhamsueva, Dulma Proninovna Dagdanova, Rinchin-Khanda Dondukovna Tsympilova, Tsybikmit Dagdanova, Dari Dagbaeva, Dashi-Dulma Chimitsyrenova, and others.

From 1943-1952, the village of Sundulga, which was located to the west of Dodo-Gol on the other side of the Uda River, was annexed to Dodo-Gol.

In the post-war years, until 1950, Dondok Badmaevich Badmaev remained the chairman of the "Defense of the USSR" collective farm, and Tsydyp Dashievich Dymbrylov served as the foreman. They raised the grain in the post-war period. In 1950, after Dondok Badmaevich Badmaev left for another collective farm, Balzhinima Rinchinovich Rinchinov became chairman of the "Defense of the USSR" collective farm. Mizhit-Dorzhi Dondokov, Zhana Ayanduev, and Namsaray Dampilovich Dagbaev subsequently headed the collective farm.

The collective farm was renamed the Malenkov collective farm, then the "Path to Communism" collective farm. In 1956, Dodo-Gol was merged with the village of Verkhniye Taltsy, and the collective farm was renamed "Communism." The "Communism" collective farm was headed by Tamara Ivanovna Makarova and Tamara Fedorovna Dubkova.

In 1948, the first administrative building was constructed in the village of Dodo-Gol, housing an office, a collective farm club, and later a library. A young demobilized soldier, Munko Ochirovich Chimitsyrenov, became the director of the collective farm club. In 1949, Munko Ochirovich established a local radio station in a small room of the collective farm club, thus providing the entire village with radio coverage.

In 1961, Dodo-Gol was transferred from the Zaigraevsky District to the Khorinsky District, to the Udinsky state farm. In 1976, the village of Dodo-Gol was transferred to the Verkhne-Taletsky state farm as Department No. 2, which remained as such until the late 1990s, when the Verkhne-Taletsky state farm was reorganized.

During these years, the material and technical base of Department No. 2 of the Verkhne-Taletsky State Farm began to be strengthened. Winter shelters and sheep pens, calf houses, and two-apartment houses for workers were built. In April 1985, a stone cowshed (MTF) for 200 head of cattle, a reconstructed fattening barn, a boiler house, a feed mill, and a team house were commissioned. In 1986, a village club with a library and a first-aid station was built.

== Famous people ==
- Damba Zhalsaraev (1925-2002) was a Buryat Soviet poet, Minister of Culture of Buryatia, and author of the lyrics to the anthem of the Republic of Buryatia.
- Svetlana Sandakova (born 1968) is a Buryat scientist, Doctor of Biological Sciences, and professor
