= Damba Zhalsarayev =

Buryat Soviet poet, writer of the Buryatia anthem (1925–2002)

- Native name: Дамба Зодбич Жалсараев
- Born: 5 December 1925 Dodo-Gol, Khorinsky District, Buryat ASSR, USSR
- Died: 21 January 2002 (aged 76) Ulan-Ude, Republic of Buryatia, Russia
- Occupation: Poet, journalist
- Language: Buryat, Russian

Damba Zodbich Zhalsarayev (Russian: Дамба Зодбич Жалсараев; 5 December 1925 – 21 January 2002) was a Soviet and Buryat poet who wrote the Buryat lyrics for the Anthem of the Republic of Buryatia. He was a member of the Union of Soviet Writers.

== Early life ==
When he was a child he worked on farms with his family. He was a student of the Transbaikal military infantry school in 1943 and served in the Second World War at a very young age. He fought against the Kwantung Army. After the war, he served 6 years in the border detachment of Kyakhtinsky District and was discharged in 1952. He was ranked as a Major.
