= Buryatia (disambiguation) =

Buryatia is a federal subject of Russia.

Buryatia may also refer to:

- Buryat Autonomous Soviet Socialist Republic (1923–1992), an administrative division of the Russian SFSR, Soviet Union
- 2593 Buryatia, a main-belt asteroid
