= Flag of Buryatia =

Republic of Buryatia
- Proportion: 1:2
- Adopted: 29 October 1992
- Design: A horizontal tricolour of blue, white, and yellow in 2:1:1 with a yellow Soyombo symbol on the hoist of the blue band.
- Designed by: N. Batuyev, V. Abayev, S. Kalmykov
- Use: Standard of the president of the Republic of Buryatia

The state flag of the Republic of Buryatia (Note: Buryat: Буряад Республикын гурэнэй туг, romanized: Buryaad Respublikiin gurenei tug; Russian: Государственный флаг Республики Бурятия) in southeastern Russia is a horizontal tricolour of blue, white and yellow in a 2:1:1 ratio with a yellow Soyombo symbol on the hoist of the blue band. It was officially adopted on 29 October 1992, after the dissolution of the Soviet Union.

== Color scheme ==
Colors scheme	Blue	White	Yellow
CMYK	100-68-0-34	0-0-0-0	0-15-100-0
HEX	#232379	#FFFFFF	#FFCC01
RGB	35-35-121	255-255-255	255-204-1

== Gallery ==
=== Timeline ===
Flag	Date	Use	Description
	1858–1883	Flag of Verkhneudinsky Uyezd	
	1883–1917	Flag of Verkhneudinsky Uyezd	
	1918–1937	Flag of the Buryat-Mongol ASSR	
	1937–1939	Flag of the Buryat-Mongol ASSR	
	1939–1954	Flag of the Buryat-Mongol ASSR	
	1954–1958	Flag of the Buryat-Mongol ASSR	
	1958–30 May 1978	Flag of the Buryat ASSR	
	30 May 1978 – 8 October 1990	Flag of the Buryat ASSR	
	8 October 1990 – 29 October 1992	Flag of the Buryat SSR (8 October 1990 – 27 March 1992) and the Republic of Buryatia (27 March–29 October 1992)	

=== Administrative divisions ===
Flag	Date	Use	Description
	?–present	Flag of Ulan-Ude	
	?–present	Flag of Barguzinsky District	
	?–present	Flag of Bauntovsky District	
	?–present	Flag of Bichursky District	
	?–present	Flag of Dzhidinsky District	
	?–present	Flag of Yeravninsky District	
	?–present	Flag of Zaigrayevsky District	
	?–present	Flag of Zakamensky District	
	?–present	Flag of Ivolginsky District	
	?–present	Flag of Kabansky District	
	2011–present	Flag of Kurumkansky District	
	?–2011	Flag of Kurumkansky District	
	?–present	Flag of Kyakhtinsky District	
	?–present	Flag of Mukhorshibirsky District	
	?–present	Flag of Okinsky District	
	?–present	Flag of Severo-Baykalsky District	
	?–present	Flag of Selenginsky District	
	?–present	Flag of Tarbagataysky District	
	?–present	Flag of Khorinsky District	

== See also ==
- Coat of arms of the Republic of Buryatia
- State Anthem of the Republic of Buryatia
