= Khasurta =

Khasurta Хасурта
- Selo
- Location within Republic of Buryatia Location within Russia
- Coordinates: 52°16′N 108°52′E
- Country: Russia
- Region: Republic of Buryatia
- District: Khorinsky District
- Time zone: UTC+8:00

Khasurta (Russian: Хасурта; Buryat: Хасуурта, Khasuurta) is a rural locality (a selo) in Khorinsky District, Republic of Buryatia, Russia. The population was 648 as of 2010. There are 6 streets.

== Geography ==
Khasurta is located 76 km west of Khorinsk (the district's administrative centre) by road. Barun-Khasurta is the nearest rural locality.
