= BASSR =

BASSR may refer to:

- The Bashkir Autonomous Soviet Socialist Republic, an autonomous polity of the Russian SFSR
- The Buryat Autonomous Soviet Socialist Republic, an autonomous polity of the Russian SFSR
