= State Anthem of Buryatia =

Bügede Nairamdakha Buryaad Ulasai duulal
English: Anthem of the Republic of Buryatia
- Бүгэдэ Найрамдаха Буряад Уласай дуулал
- The Coat of Arms of Buryatia
- Regional anthem of Buryatia, Russia
- Lyrics: Damba Zhalsarayev (Buryat version); Oleg Dmitriyev (Russian version)
- Music: Anatoliy Andreyev
- Adopted: 20 April 1995

Audio sample
- Official band instrumental rendition in C minor: file; help

Official orchestral and choral vocal recording (Buryat and Russian version) in D minor
Version with the first verse in Russian, the second and third in Buryat, and the fourth in Russian

The State Anthem of the Republic of Buryatia (Note: Buryat: Буряад Уласай түрын дуулал, romanized: Buryaad Ulasai türiin duulal, pronounced [bʊˈrʲaːt ʊlɐˈsɛː tʰuˈrɨːɴ ˈdʊːlɐl]) is one of the state symbols of Buryatia—a federal subject of Russia—along with its flag and coat of arms. It was first used unofficially for the Buryat Autonomous Soviet Socialist Republic between 1983 and 1990, titled "Song of the Native Land" (Note: Russian: Песня о родной земле, romanized: Pesnja o rodnoj zemle, pronounced [ˈpʲesʲnʲə ə‿rɐdˈnoj zʲɪˈmlʲe]; Buryat: Түрэл нютагай дуун, romanized: Türel nyutagai duun) with original lyrics in Russian.

The lyrics were written by Buryat poet Damba Zhalsarayev, and the music was composed by Buryat composer and music teacher Anatoliy Andreyev. It was adopted on 20 April 1995, with Law N121-I "On the State Anthem of the Republic of Buryatia".

== Lyrics ==
Lyrics are official in both Buryat and Russian languages.

=== Buryat version ===
Cyrillic script

Үнгын дайдаар, хангай тайгаар нэмжыгшэ
Үлзы Буряад – манай нангин үлгы.
𝄆 Сэлмэг сарюун, сэнхир номин шарайшни
Сэдьхэлдэмнай хэзээдэшье зулгы. 𝄇

Эрхим хангал санзай шэнги агаарташ
Эршэ хүсөөр элсүүлэнгүй яалайб!
𝄆 Эмтэй домтой мүнхын уһан аршаандаш
Эльгэ зүрхөө хүртүүлэнгүй яалайб! 𝄇

Холын замда эхын ёһоор юрөөжэ,
Хүмүүн зондо хэтын жаргал хүсөөш.
𝄆 Саяан хадын (Note: The word «уулын» uuliin [ˈʊːˌlɨːɴ] is also used.) сэлгеэн амяар арюудхан,
Байгал далайн гэгээн долгёор сүршөөш. 𝄇

Шэрүүн сагай ерээшье һаа дэлхэйдэ, (Note: Also «Шэрүүн сагһаа сусархагүйл хэзээшье» (Sherüün saghaa susarkhagüil khezeeshye) [ʃɯˈruːɴ saqˈɦaː sʊ.sar.χaˈɡʷɪl xəˈzeːʃʲ.jə].)
Шинии заяан замһаа хадуурхагүйл. (Note: Also «Шинии заяан, шинии үндэр харгы» (Shinii zayaan, shinii ünder khargii) [ʃɯˈnʲiː zaˈjaːɴ | ʃɯˈnʲiː ˈun.dər χarˈɡɨː].)
𝄆 Эбтэй дорюун бүлын ёһоор жаргыш даа,
Энхэ Буряад – манай нангин үлгы. 𝄇

Эхэ нютаг! (Note: Also «Нангин үлгы!» (Nangin ulgii!) [ˈnaŋ.gʲɪɴ ulˈgɨː].)

Latin script

Üngiin daidaar, khangai taigaar nemzhiigshe
Ülzii Buryaad – manai nangin ülgii.
𝄆 Selmeg saryuun senkhir nomin sharaishni
Sedkheldemnai khezeedeshye zulgii. 𝄇

Erkhim khangal sanzai shengi agaartash
Ershe khüsöör elsüülengüi yaalaib!
𝄆 Emtei domtoi münkhiin uhan arshaandash
Elge zürkhöö khürtüülengüi yaalaib! 𝄇

Kholiin zamda ekhiin yohoor yüröözhe,
Khümüün zondo khetiin zhargal khüsöösh.
𝄆 Sayaan khadiin selgyeen amyaar aryuudkhan,
Baigal dalain gegeen dolgyoor sürshöösh. 𝄇

Sherüün sagai yereeshye haa delkheide,
Shinii zayaan zamhaa khaduurkhagüil.
𝄆 Ebtei doryuun büliin yohoor zhargiish daa,
Enkhe Buryaad – manai nangin ülgii. 𝄇

Ekhe nyutag!

IPA transcription (Note: See Help:IPA and Buryat language § Phonology.)

[uŋˈgɨːɴ | ˈdɛːˌdaːr | χaɴˈɢɛː ˈtʰɛːˌʁaːr ˈnem.ʒʲɪk.ʃə |]
[ulˈzɨː bʊˈrʲaːt maˈnɛː ˈnaŋ.gʲɪɴ ulˈgɨː ǁ]
𝄆 [ˈsɯl.mək saˈrʲʊːɴ ˈsɯŋ.xʲɪr ˈnɔ.mʲɪɴ ʃaˈrɛːʃ.nʲɪ |]
[sɯtʲ.xəl.dəmˈnɛː xəˈzeː.dəʃʲ.jə zʊlˈgɨː ‖] 𝄇

[ˈer.xʲɪm | ˈχaɴ.ɢɐl | sanˈzɛː ˈʃɯŋ.gʲɪ aˈʁaːr.tʰɐʃ |]
[ˈer.ʃə xuˈsɵːr elˈsuː.ləŋ.ˌgʷɪ ˈjaːˌlɛːp ‖]
𝄆 [emˈtʰeː dɔmˈtʰɞː muŋˈxɨːɴ ˈʊ.ɦɐɴ arˈʃaːn.dɐʃ |]
[ˈelʲ.gə zurˈxɵː xurˈtʰuː.ləŋˌgʷɪ ˈjaːˌlɛːp ‖] 𝄇

[χɔˈlɨːɴ | ˈzam.dɐ | eˈxɨːɴ jɔˈɦɔːr juˈrɵː.ʒə |]
[xuˈmuːɴ ˈzɔn.dɞ xəˈtʰɨːɴ ˈʒar.ɢɐl xuˈsɵːʃ ‖]
𝄆 [saˈjaːɴ χaˈdɨːɴ sɯlʲˈgʲeːɴ aˈmʲaːr aˈrʲʊːt.χɐɴ |]
[ˈbɛː.ʁɐl daˈlɛːɴ geˈgeːɴ dɔlʲˈgʲɔːr surˈʃɵːʃ ‖] 𝄇

[ʃɯˈruːɴ | saˈʁɛː | jeˈreːʃʲ.jə ˈɦaː delˈxeː.də |]
[ʃɯˈnʲiː zaˈjaːɴ zamˈɦaː χaˈdʊːr.χɐˌgʷɪl ‖]
𝄆 [epˈtʰeː dɔˈrʲʊːɴ buˈlɨːɴ jɔˈɦɔːr ʒarˈgɨːʃ ˈdaː |]
[ˈeŋ.xə bʊˈrʲaːt | ma.ˈnɛː ˈnaŋ.gʲɪɴ ulˈgɨː ǁ] 𝄇

[ˈe.xə | ˈnʲʊ.tʰɐq ‖]

Official Buryat vocal rendition

Traditional Buryat vocal rendition

Official Russian vocal rendition

In the Mongolian script:

ᠦᠩᠭᠢᠨ ᠳᠠᠶᠳᠠᠷ ᠬᠠᠩᠭᠠᠶ ᠲᠠᠶᠭᠠᠷ ᠨᠡᠮᠵᠢᠭᠰᠢ
ᠦᠯᠰᠦ ᠪᠤᠷᠢᠶᠠᠳ – ᠮᠠᠨᠠᠶ ᠨᠠᠩᠭᠢᠨ ᠦᠯᠭᠢ
𝄆 ᠰᠡᠯᠮᠡᠭ ᠰᠠᠷᠢᠶᠤᠨ, ᠰᠡᠩᠬᠢᠷ ᠨᠣᠮᠢᠨ ᠱᠠᠷᠠᠢᠱᠨᠢ
ᠰᠡᠳᠢᠬᠡᠯᠳᠡᠮᠨᠠᠶ ᠬᠡᠵᠡᠳᠡᠰᠢᠶᠡ ᠵᠤᠯᠭᠢ 𝄇

ᠡᠷᠬᠢᠮ ᠬᠠᠨᠭᠠᠯ ᠰᠠᠨᠵᠠᠶ ᠱᠡᠨᠭᠢ ᠠᠭᠠᠭᠠᠷᠲᠠᠰᠢ
ᠡᠷᠰᠡ ᠬᠦᠰᠥᠷ ᠡᠯᠰᠤᠦᠯᠡᠨᠨᠦᠢ ᠶᠠᠯᠠᠶᠪᠢ!
𝄆 ᠡᠮᠲᠡᠶ ᠳᠣᠮᠲᠣᠶ ᠮᠦᠨᠬᠢᠨ ᠦᠬᠠᠨ ᠠᠷᠰᠢᠶᠠᠨᠳᠠᠰᠢ
ᠡᠯᠭᠡ ᠵᠦᠷᠬᠡᠥ ᠬᠦᠷᠲᠦᠯᠡᠨᠨᠦᠢ ᠶᠠᠯᠠᠶᠪᠢ! 𝄇

ᠬᠣᠯᠢᠨ ᠵᠠᠮᠳᠠ ᠡᠬᠡᠨ ᠶᠥᠰᠤᠷ ᠶᠦᠷᠥᠭᠡᠵᠡ,
ᠬᠦᠮᠦᠨ ᠵᠣᠨᠳᠣ ᠬᠡᠲᠡᠨ ᠵᠠᠷᠭᠠᠯ ᠬᠦᠰᠡᠥᠱᠡ.
𝄆 ᠰᠠᠶᠠᠨ ᠬᠠᠳᠢᠨ ᠰᠡᠯᠭᠡᠡᠨ ᠠᠮᠶᠠᠷ ᠠᠷᠤᠭᠳᠬᠠᠨ,
ᠪᠠᠶᠠᠭᠠᠯ ᠳᠠᠯᠠᠶᠢᠨ ᠭᠡᠭᠡᠭᠡᠨ ᠳᠣᠯᠭᠢᠥᠷ ᠰᠦᠷᠱᠦᠡᠱᠡ. 𝄇

ᠰᠢᠷᠦᠨ ᠰᠠᠭᠠᠶ ᠡᠷᠡᠭᠡᠰᠢᠶᠡ ᠬᠠᠰᠠ ᠳᠡᠯᠬᠡᠢᠳᠡ,
ᠱᠢᠨᠢᠢ ᠵᠠᠶᠠᠨ ᠵᠠᠮᠰᠠ ᠬᠠᠳᠤᠭᠷᠬᠠᠭᠦᠢᠯᠢ.
𝄆 ᠡᠪᠲᠡᠢ ᠳᠣᠷᠦᠦᠨ ᠪᠦᠯᠦᠨ ᠶᠥᠰᠤᠷ ᠵᠠᠷᠭᠢᠰᠢ ᠳᠠᠶᠠ,
ᠡᠨᠬᠡ ᠪᠤᠷᠢᠶᠠᠳ – ᠮᠠᠨᠠᠶ ᠨᠠᠩᠭᠢᠨ ᠦᠯᠭᠢ. 𝄇

ᠡᠬᠡ ᠨᠦᠲᠤᠭ!

=== Russian version ===
Cyrillic script

Таёжная, озёрная, степная,
Ты добрым светом солнечным полна.
𝄆 Цветущая от края и до края,
Будь счастлива, родная сторона. 𝄇

Брусничный дух, черёмухи дыханье,
Лилового багульника настой.
𝄆 Я не дышу, а пью благоуханье
Моей земли, равнинной и лесной. 𝄇

Прими, земля, сыновнее спасибо,
Святой водой Байкала угости, (Note: «Крутой водой Аршана угости» in the original lyrics during the Buryat ASSR.)
𝄆 Чтоб я обрёл невиданную силу
Для дальнего нелёгкого пути. 𝄇

С тобой, земля, мы слиты воедино,
Моею стала и судьба твоя.
𝄆 Поклон тебе от сердца, край родимый,
Любимая Бурятия моя. 𝄇

О, мать-земля!

Latin script

Tajožnaja, ozjornaja, stepnaja,
Ty dobrym svetom solnečnym polna.
𝄆 Cvetuščaja ot kraja i do kraja,
Budj sčastliva, rodnaja storona. 𝄇

Brusničnyj duh, čerjomuhi dyhanje,
Lilovogo baguljnika nastoj.
𝄆 Ja ne dyšu, a piu blagouhanje
Mojej zemli, ravninnoj i lesnoj. 𝄇

Primi, zemlja, synovneje spasibo,
Svjatoj vodoj Bajkala ugosti,
𝄆 Čtob ja obrjol nevidannuju silu
Dlja daljnego neljogkogo puti. 𝄇

S toboj, zemlja, my slity vojedino,
Mojeju stala i sudjba tvoja.
𝄆 Poklon tebe ot serdca, kraj rodimyj,
Ljubimaja Burjatija moja. 𝄇

O, matj-zemlja!

IPA transcription as sung (Note: See File:Anthem of Buryatia (orchestral vocal version) (Russian).ogg, Help:IPA/Russian and Russian phonology.)

[tɐˈjɵ.ʐnɐ.jɐ | ɐˈzʲɵr.nɐ.jɐ sʲtʲɪˈpna.jɐ |]
[tɨ ˈdo.brɨm ˈsvʲɛ.tɐm ˈsoɫ.nʲɪ.tɕnɨm pɐɫˈna ‖]
𝄆 [tsvʲɪˈtu.ɕːæ.jɐ ɐt‿ˈkra.jɐ i dɐ‿ˈkra.jɐ |]
[butʲ ˈɕːæ.lʲi.vɐ rɐˈdna.jɐ stɐ.rɐˈna ‖] 𝄇

[brʊˈsʲnʲi.tɕnɨj dux | tɕɪˈrʲɵ.mʊ.xʲi dɨˈxa.nʲjɛ |]
[lʲɪˈɫo.vɐ.vɐ bɐˈɡulʲ.nʲɪ.kɐ nɐˈstoj ‖]
𝄆 [ja nʲɛ dɨˈʂu ɐ‿pʲju bɫɐ.ɡɐ.ʊˈxa.nʲjɛ |]
[mɐˈjej zʲɪˈmʲlʲi rɐˈvʲnʲi.nːɐj i lʲɪˈsnoj ‖] 𝄇

[prʲɪˈmʲi | zʲɪˈmʲlʲa | sɨˈno.vʲnʲɛ.jɛ spɐˈsʲi.bɐ |]
[svʲɐˈtoj vɐˈdoj bɐjˈka.ɫɐ ʊ.ɡɐˈsʲtʲi |]
𝄆 [ʂtob‿ja ɐˈbrʲɵɫ nʲɪˈvʲi.dɐn.nʊ.jʊ ˈsʲi.ɫʊ |]
[dlʲɐ‿ˈdalʲ.nʲɛ.vɐ nʲɛˈlʲɵx.kɐ.vɐ pʊˈtʲi ‖] 𝄇

[s‿tɐˈboj | zʲɪˈmʲlʲa | mɨ ˈsʲlʲi.tɨ vɐ.jɛˈdʲi.nɐ |]
[mɐˈje.jʊ ˈsta.ɫɐ i sʊdʲˈba tvɐˈja ‖]
𝄆 [pɐˈkɫon tʲɛˈbʲɛ ɐt‿ˈsʲɛr.tsɛ kraj rɐˈdʲi.mɨj |]
[lʲʊˈbʲi.mɐ.jɐ bʊˈrʲa.tʲi.jɐ mɐˈja ‖] 𝄇

[o matʲ | zʲɪˈmʲlʲa ‖]

=== English translation ===
Literary translation from Buryat

Taigas, mountains and lakes form thy very nature.
Buryatia, my heavenly earth.
𝄆 Thy verdant landscapes are never from me far;
In our hearts the most wonderful hearth. 𝄇

Buryatia, thou giv'st the air aroma;
I am blessed with thine energy divine.
𝄆 Thy precious springs are the source of anima;
I let my heart and soul in thine ease shine. 𝄇

Buryatia, to a journey deep and long,
We are girt by thine ardour pure and strong.
𝄆 Thee we behold by thy bracing sublime brine,
May Lake Baikal be holy pride of thine. 𝄇

This bitter world with hardships and distress filled,
Let not the sore envy of hell thee gird.
𝄆 May holy honour and blessing be thine,
O beloved Buryatia of mine! 𝄇

O Motherland!

Literal translation from Russian

Land of the taiga, the lakes, and prairies,
you are full of good sunlight.
𝄆 Prosperous from one edge to another,
be happy, our native country. 𝄇

A spirit of cranberry, a breath of cherry,
infusion of violet rosemary.
𝄆 I do not breathe, but I drink the fragrance,
of my country's plains and forests. 𝄇

My country, accept the gratitude of your sons,
receive the holy water of Baikal.
𝄆 So I find power unprecedented,
to a path long and hard. 𝄇

We are united with you, our land,
your destiny has become mine too.
𝄆 I bow to you from my heart, dear country,
my beloved Buryatia! 𝄇

Oh, motherland!

== See also ==
- Coat of arms of Buryatia
- Flag of Buryatia
- National anthem of Mongolia
- State Anthem of the Republic of Kalmykia
