= Alan, Republic of Buryatia =

Alan Алан
- Ulus
- Location within Republic of Buryatia Location within Russia
- Coordinates: 52°18′N 109°52′E
- Country: Russia
- Region: Republic of Buryatia
- District: Khorinsky District
- Time zone: UTC+8:00

Alan (Russian: Алан) is a rural locality (an ulus) in Khorinsky District, Republic of Buryatia, Russia. The population was 323 as of 2010. There are 20 streets.
