= Coat of arms of the Republic of Buryatia =

- Armiger: Republic of Buryatia
- Adopted: 20 April 1995

The coat of arms of the Republic of Buryatia (Note: Buryat: Буряад Республикын гурэнэй герб/һүлдэ, romanized: Buryaad Respublikiin gurenei gerb/hülde; Russian: Государственный герб Республики Бурятия) is one of the official symbols of the Republic of Buryatia—a federal subject of Russia. It was adopted on 20 April 1995.

== History ==
Emblem of the Buryat Autonomous Soviet Socialist Republic
- Armiger: Buryat Autonomous Soviet Socialist Republic
- Adopted: March 1925 (first version); 14 March 1937 (second version); 30 May 1978 (third version)
- Crest: Red star
- Supporters: Wheat and Cotton
- Motto: Бyхы оронуудай пролетаринар, нэгэдэгты! (Buryat) Пролетарии всех стран, соединяйтесь! (Russian) "Workers of the world, unite!"

On May 30, 1923, the two autonomous regions of the Buryat-Mongol of Siberia and the Far East, was combined to form the Buryat-Mongolian ASSR. Two years after its establishment, on 13 August 1925, the Central Executive Committee of the Union Republics ordered the autonomous republic of the ASSRs to design their emblems. The Buryat government then held a competition, which saw twenty emblem proposals submitted for consideration, including designs by Yakov Rubanchik. The winner of the competition was officially determined at the 2nd session of the Central Executive Committee of the Buryat-Mongol ASSR on November 1925, and the design was submitted to the Central Executive Committee of the Soviet Union two months later. The adopted emblem was included in the March 1927 draft constitution of the Buryat-Mongol ASSR.

The emblem was changed following the adoption of the Constitution of the Buryat-Mongol ASSR in February 1937. The Article 111 of the Constitution describes the emblem is similar to the emblem of the RSFSR, but with the inscriptions in Russian and Buryat-Mongolian. Additionally, the name of the state, Buryat-Mongol ASSR is inscribed below the Russian SFSR in the emblem in Russian and Buryat-Mongolian. Originally, the Buryat-Mongolian language used Latin script, and the inscriptions looked like: "РСФСР. RSFSR. БУРЯТ-МОНГОЛЬСКАЯ АССР. BURIAAD-MONGOL ASSR". However, the Buryat writing system frequently changed, and there was no consensus as to the proper name of country and the translation of the motto "Workers of the world, unite!" in the Buryat language.

The inscription in the emblem undergone significant change in 1939, when the Buryat language switched to Cyrilic letters. The Buryat inscription changed from BURIAAD-MONGOL ASSR to БУРЯАД-МОНГОЛ АССР and the RSFSR inscription in the emblem was removed. The second major change occurred on 7 July 1958, when the country was renamed from Buryat-Mongol to Buryatia. The БУРЯТ-МОНГОЛЬСКАЯ АССР and БУРЯАД-МОНГОЛ АССР inscription changed again, this time to БУРЯТСКАЯ АССР and БУРЯАДАЙ АССР.

Another change on the Buryat ASSR's emblem occurred following the adoption of a new constitution on 30 May 1978. The emblem, which was described in Article 157 of the constitution, saw the addition of a red star on top of the emblem and minor changes in the inscription (the РСФСР inscription was widened to make it parallel to the country's name inscription).

Several years prior to the dissolution of the Soviet Union, in October 1990 the Buryat ASSR adopted a new emblem, designed by A. F. Horеnov. The emblem was re-adopted after the Buryat ASSR dissolved and renamed as the Republic of Buryatia.

== See also ==
- Flag of the Republic of Buryatia
- Anthem of the Republic of Buryatia
