= Klyuyevka =

Klyuyevka Клюевка
- Settlement
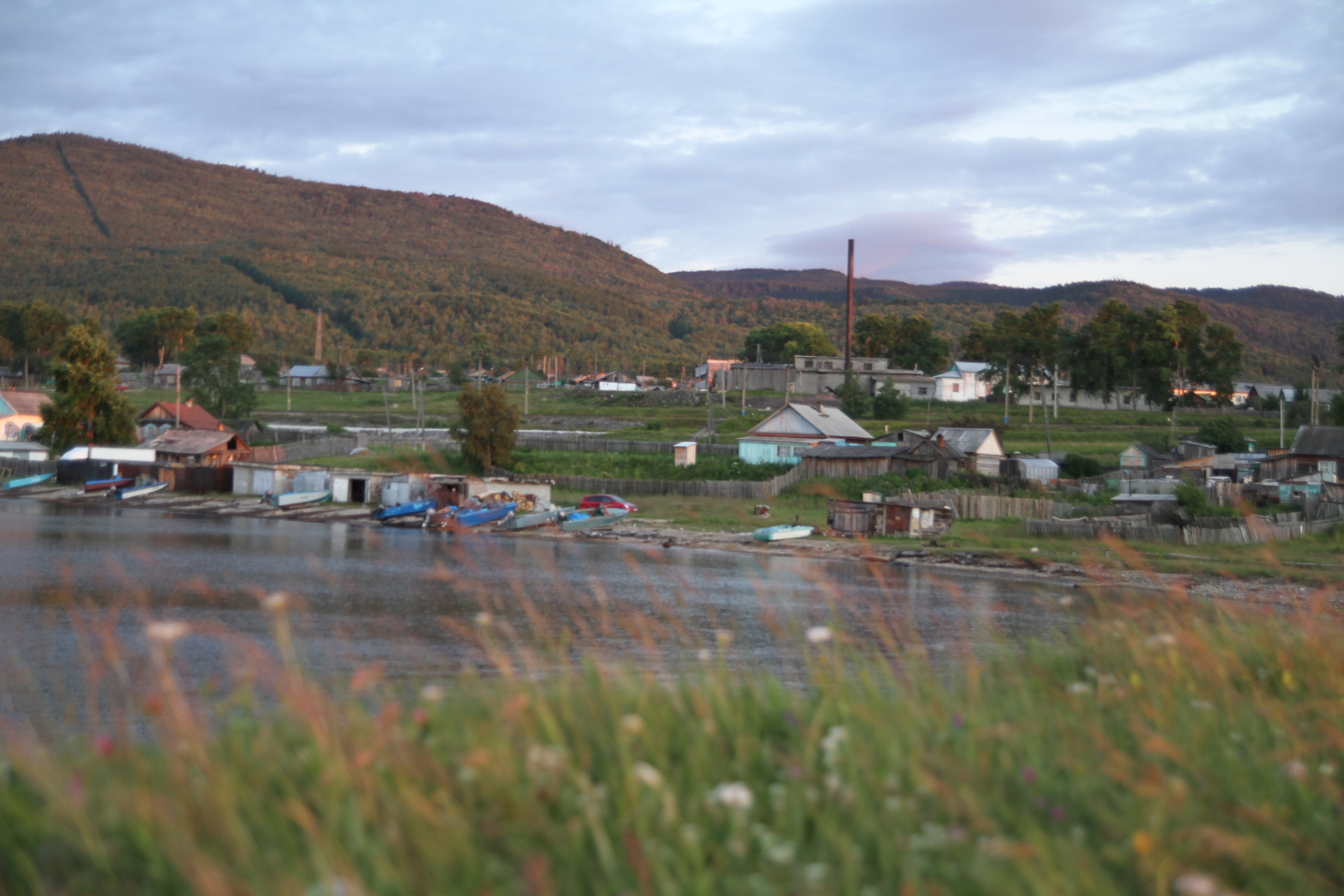

- Location within Republic of Buryatia Location within Russia
- Coordinates: 51°41′N 105°45′E
- Country: Russia
- Region: Republic of Buryatia
- District: Kabansky District
- Time zone: UTC+8:00

Klyuyevka (Russian: Клюевка) is a rural locality (a settlement) in Kabansky District, Republic of Buryatia, Russia. The population was 1,231 as of 2010. There are 18 streets.

== Geography ==
Klyuyevka is located 80 km southwest of Kabansk (the district's administrative centre) by road. Babushkin is the nearest rural locality.
