= Buryat National Opera =

Opera house in Ulan-Ude, Buryatia, Russia

Coordinates: 51.833063°N 107.583392°E

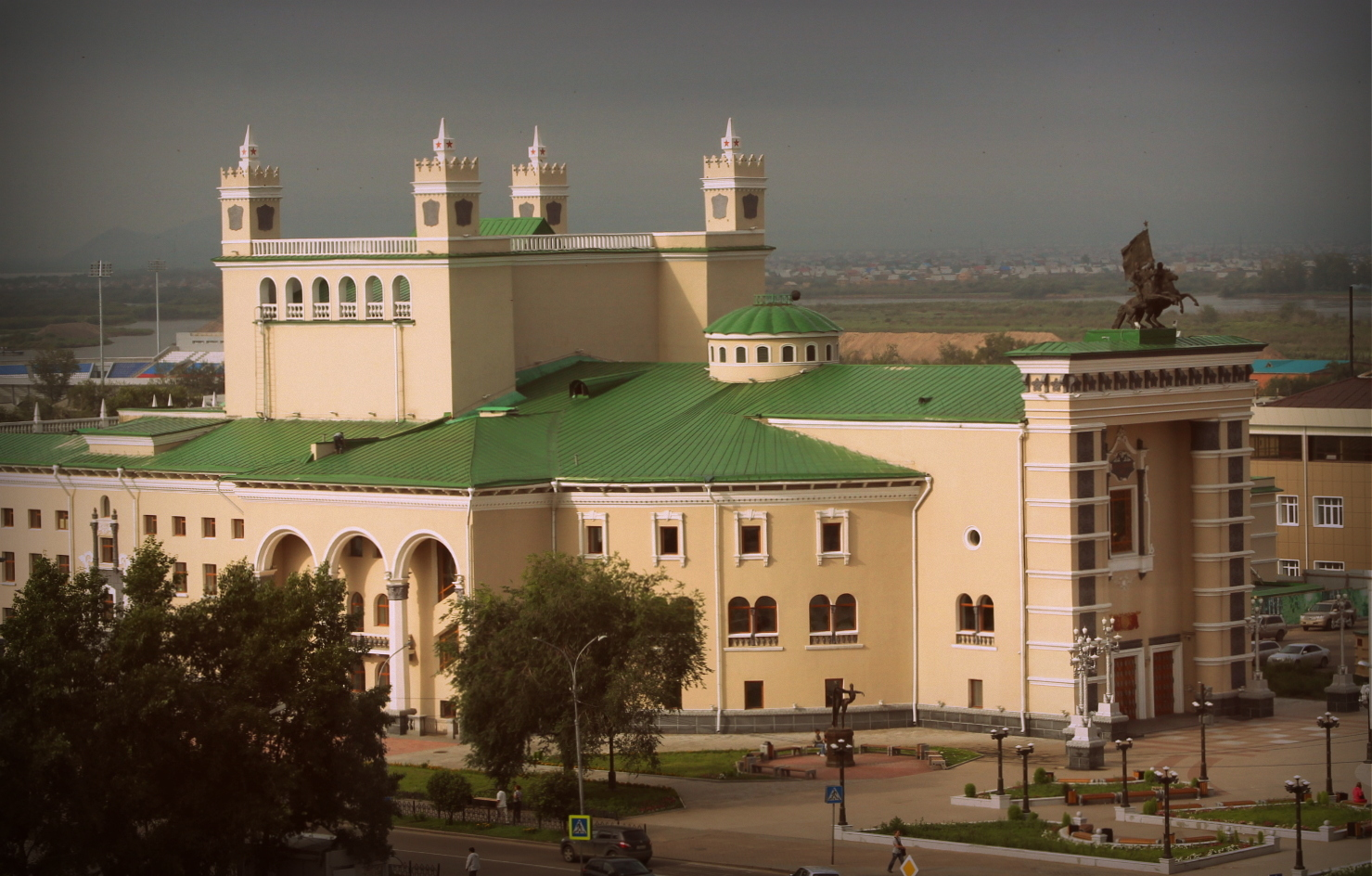
External view, 2012

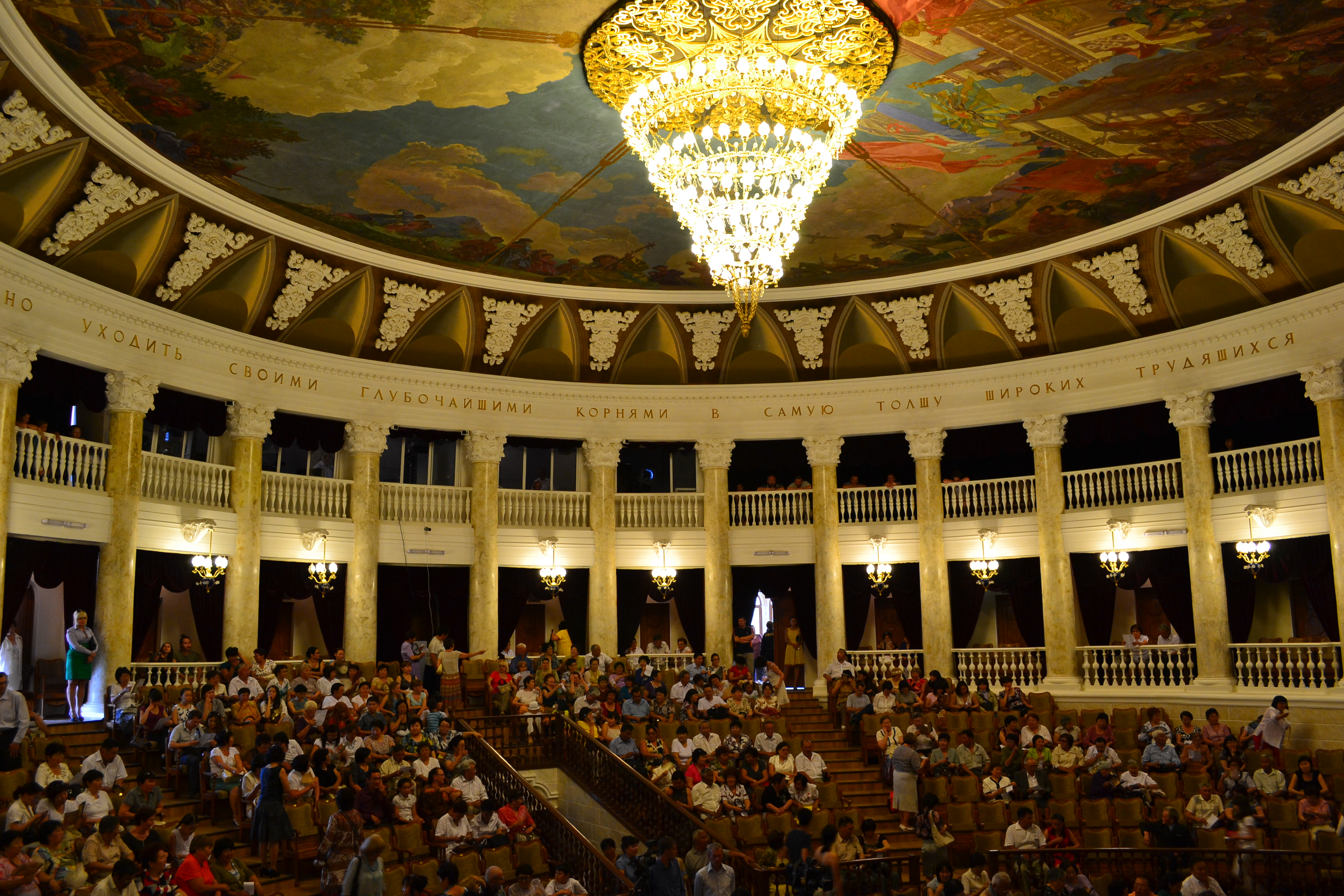
Theatre's interior, 2011

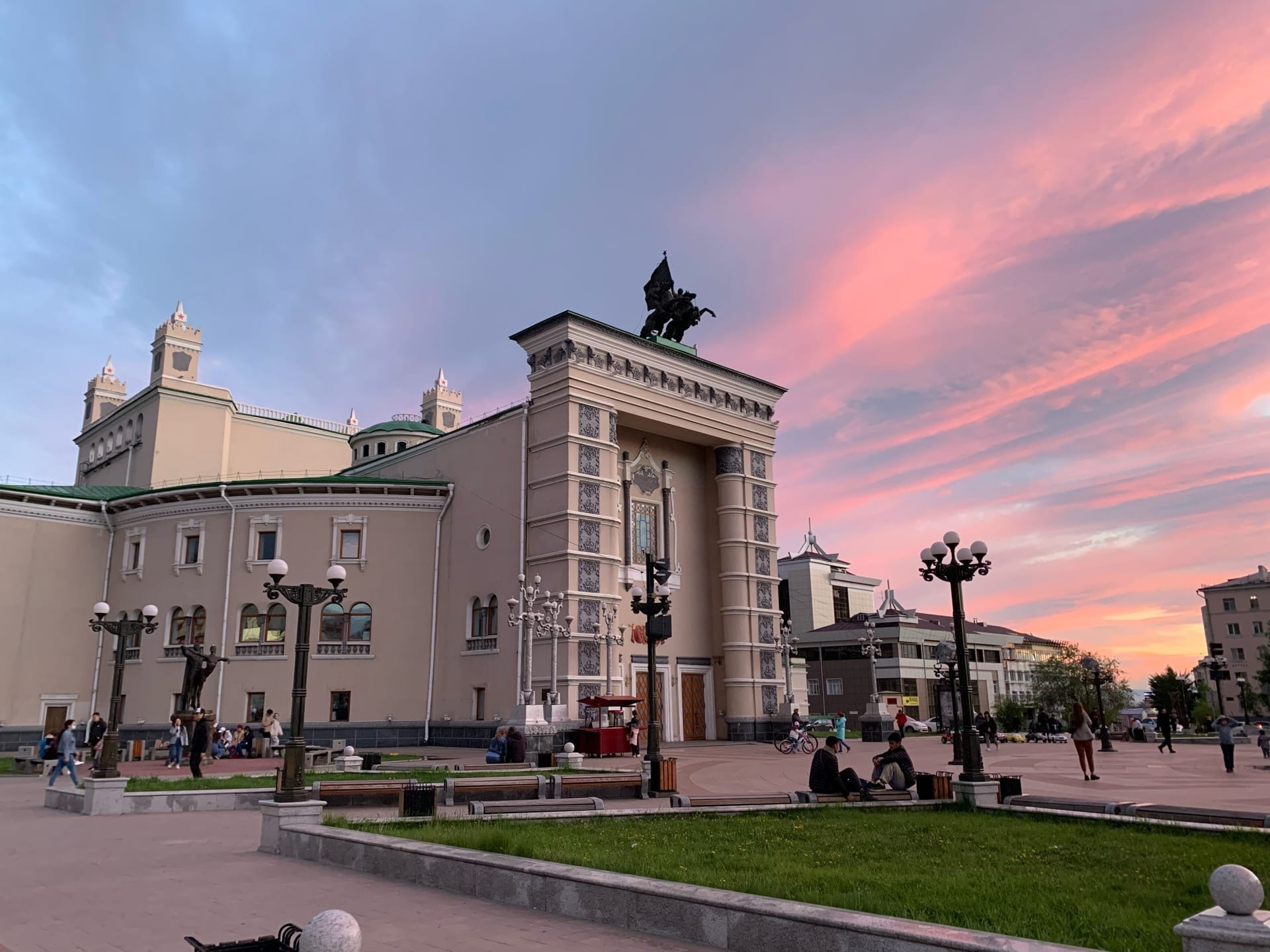
Theater building in the evening. June 8, 2021

Buryat Opera and Ballet Theatre (officially known as the "G. Tsydynzhapov Buryat State Academic Opera and Ballet Theatre", Buryat: Г. Цыдынжаповай нэрэмжэтэ Буряадай гγрэнэй дуури бγжэгэй эрдэмэй театр, Russian: Бурятский театр оперы и балета имени Г. Ц. Цыдынжапова) is a music theatre in Ulan-Ude, the capital of the Buryat Republic, Russia. It operates its own music school, a dance school, and an art institute. The theatre opened in 1939. It is named after Buryat drama actor and director Gombozhap Tsydynzhapov (ru).
