= Buryat Autonomous Soviet Socialist Republic =

Entity within the Russian SFSR

Buryat Autonomous Soviet Socialist Republic Бурятская Автономная Советская Социалистическая Республика (Russian) Буряадай Автономито Совет Социалис Республика (Buryat)
- ASSR of the Russian SFSR; Republic of the Russian Federation
- 1923–1992
- Flag (1978–1990) Emblem (1978–1990)

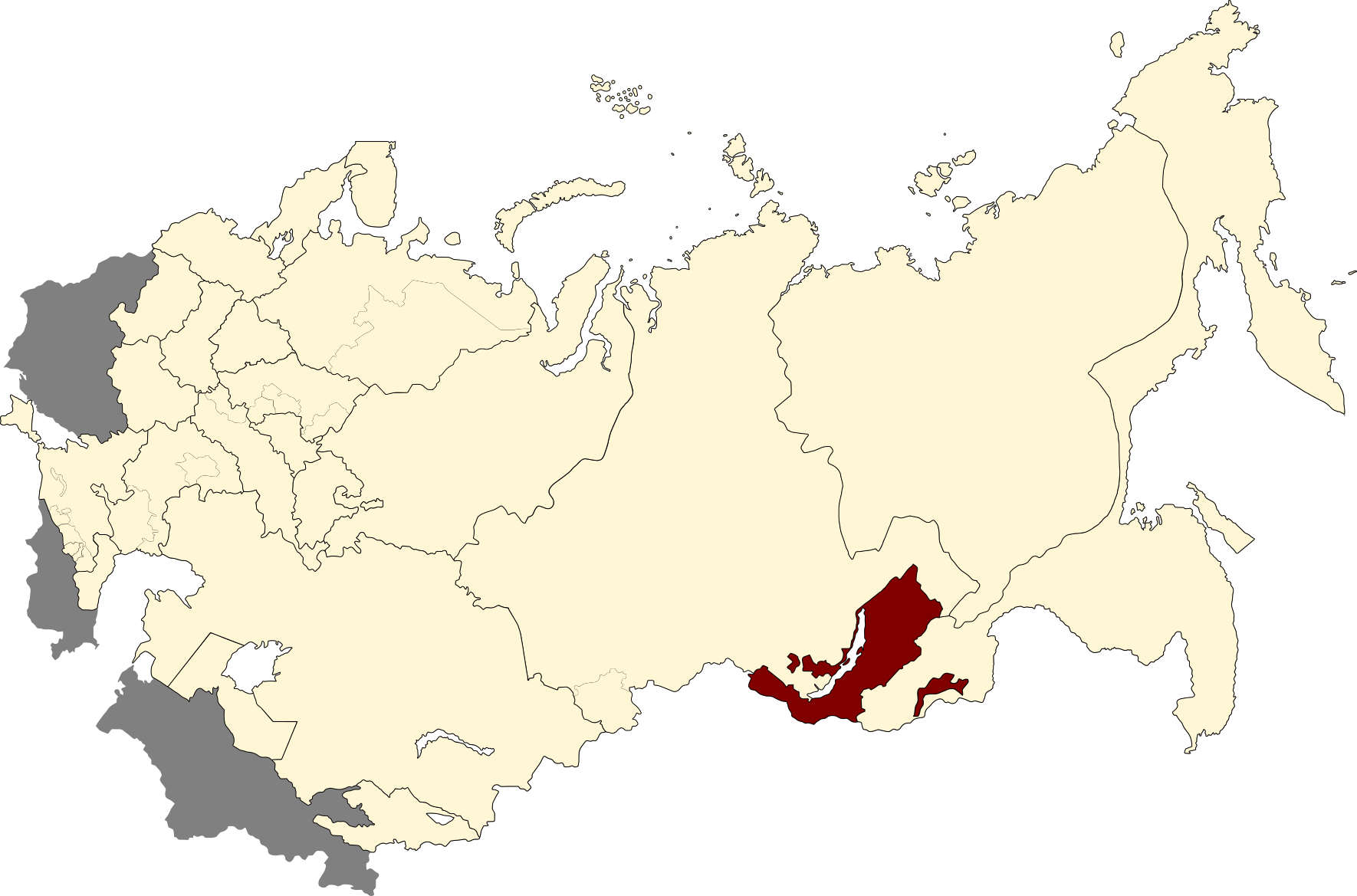
- Location of the Buryat ASSR within the Russian Soviet Federative Socialist Republic (1930)

Anthem
- Песня о Родной Земле; Song of the Native Land (unofficial, 1983–1992)
- Capital: Ulan-Ude
- Demonym: Buryat
- Area
  - 1923: 69,857 km^{2} (26,972 sq mi)
- Population
  - 1923: 118,000
- Government
  - Motto: Бухы Оронуудай Пролетаринар, Нэгэдэгты!
- History
  - Established: 30 May 1923
  - Sovereignty declared (Renamed to the Buryat SSR): 8 October 1990
  - Renamed to the Republic of Buryatia: 27 March 1992
Preceded by	Succeeded by
RSFSR	Republic of Buryatia

The Buryat Autonomous Soviet Socialist Republic, (Note: Russian: Бурятская Автономная Советская Социалистическая Республика; Buryat: Буряадай Автономито Совет Социалис Республика, romanized: Buriadai Autonomito Soviet Sotsialis Riespublika) abbreviated as Buryat ASSR, (Note: Russian: Бурятская АССР; Buryat: Буряадай АССР) was an autonomous republic of the Russian SFSR within the Soviet Union.

== History ==
In May 1923, the republic was created with the name Buryat-Mongol Autonomous Soviet Socialist Republic. Its predecessors were two autonomous okrugs, each comprising discontiguius areas around Lake Baikal, and having similar names: the Mongol-Buryat Autonomous Oblast to the west and the Buryat-Mongol Autonomous Oblast to the east—the latter was part of the Far Eastern Republic until that was absorbed into the RSFSR in late 1922. When the republic was formed, "Buryat-Mongolian" language was declared the official language. In 1958, the name "Mongol" was removed from the name of the republic, as a result of Mao Zedong's attempt to extend China’s influence over Mongol peoples.

In May 1929, the Party Central Committee decreed that Buryat agriculture would undergo "socialist reorganization" - Buryat resistance to the collectivist policy was fierce, with Buryat herders slaughtering their livestock rather than allowing them to be confiscated. Nevertheless, traditional livelihoods were forcibly altered under Soviet policy. Nomads were forcibly resettled on collectivist farms of cattle and sheep, trappers were made to rear sable in captivity, and Buryat hunters were forced to live in Party-approved "hunting stations".

In the 1930s, Buryat-Mongolia was one of the sites of Soviet studies aimed to disprove Nazi race theories. Amongst other things, Soviet physicians studied the "endurance and fatigue levels" of Russian, Buryat-Mongol, and Russian-Buryat-Mongol workers to prove that all three groups were equally able.

During World War II, the head of the ASSR was Gunsyn Tsydenova.

== Dissolution ==
The Buryat ASSR declared its sovereignty in 1990 and adopted the name Republic of Buryatia in 1992. However, it remained an autonomous republic within the Russian Federation.

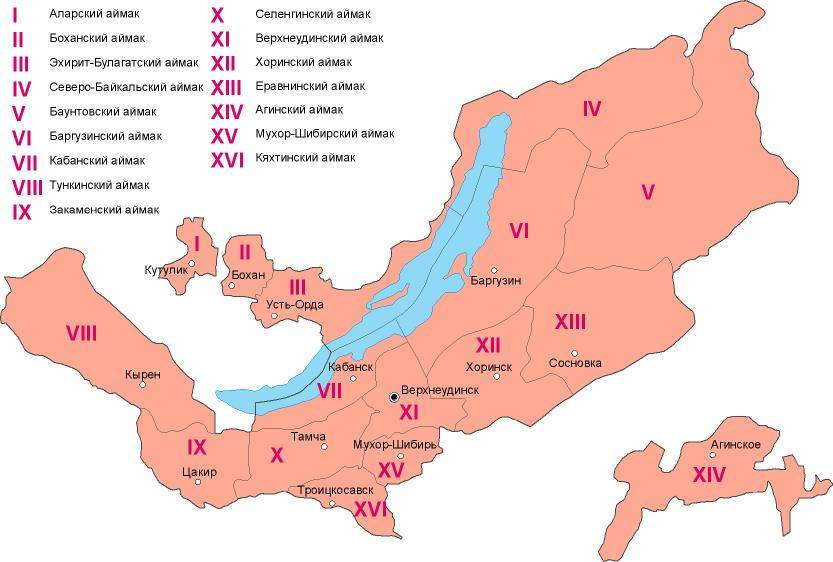
Buryat-Mongol ASSR in 1925.

== See also ==
- Republic of Buryatia
- State of Buryat-Mongolia
- Buryat Regional Committee of the Communist Party of the Soviet Union
