= Khorinsk =

Khorinsk Хоринск
- Selo
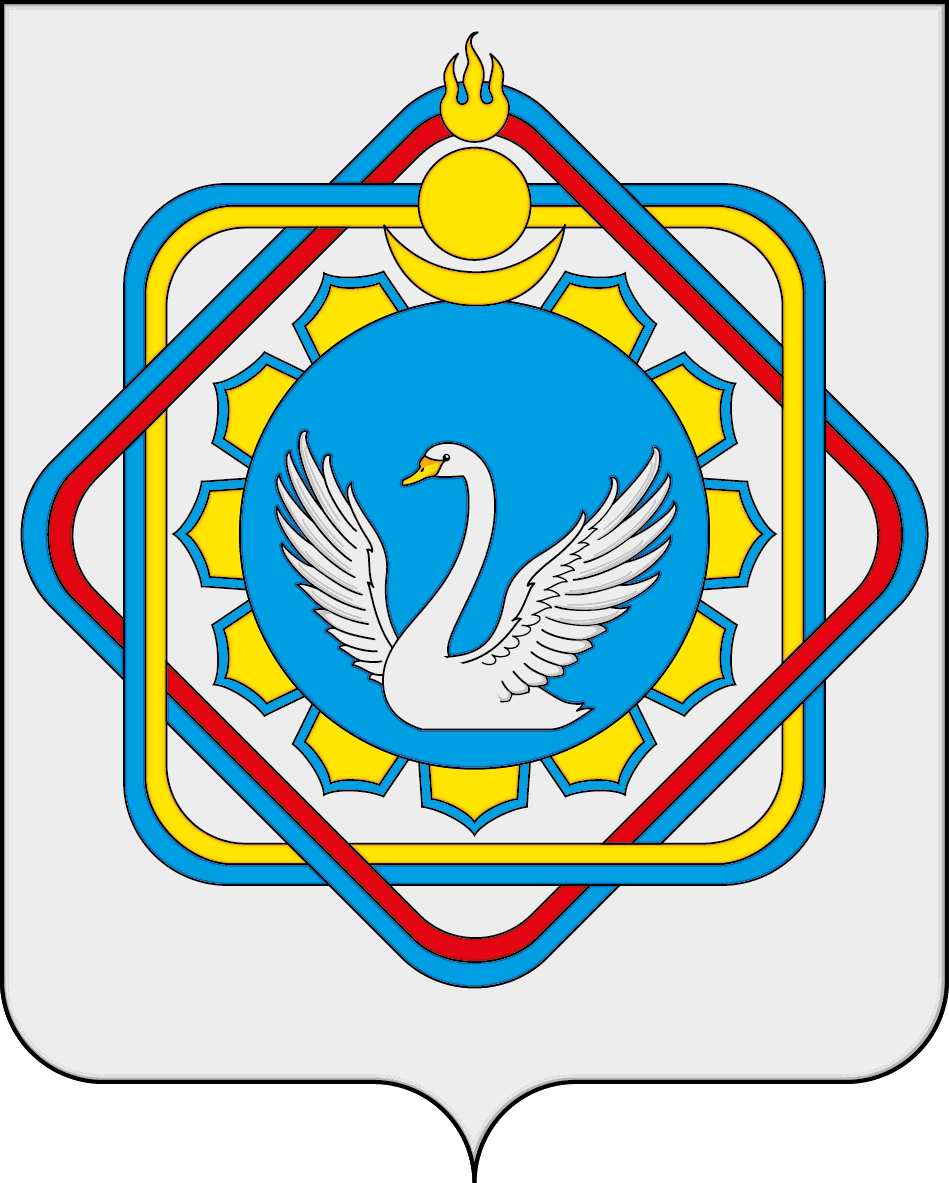
- Coat of arms
- Interactive map of Khorinsk
- Location of Khorinsk Khorinsk (Republic of Buryatia)
- Coordinates: 52°09′42″N 109°46′09″E
- Country: Russia
- Federal subject: Buryatia
- Administrative district: Khorinsky District
- SelsovietSelsoviet: Khorinsky

Population (2010 Census)
  - Total: 8,138
  - Estimate (2021): 8,650 (+6.3%)

Administrative status
  - Capital of: Khorinsky District, Khorinsky Selsoviet

Municipal status
  - Municipal district: Khorinsky Municipal District
  - Rural settlement: Khorinskoye Rural Settlement
  - Capital of: Khorinsky Municipal District, Khorinskoye Rural Settlement
- Time zone: UTC+8 (MSK+5)
- Postal code: 671410
- OKTMO ID: 81657435101

Khorinsk (Russian: Хо́ринск, Buryat: Хори, Khori) is a rural locality (a selo) and the administrative center of Khorinsky District of the Republic of Buryatia, Russia. In recent census', its population has been: 8,138 (2010 census); 8,134 (2002 census); 8,661 (1989 Soviet census).

== History ==
Khorinsk was formed by the merger of two villages: Duma and Bazar. Duma was the center of Khorin steppe Duma. In the village bazaar lived Yasak peasants and they held trade fairs. After the abolition of the Steppe Duma, the village became known as Nikolskoye. In 1917, Nikolskoye was renamed Dodo-Anninskoe. In 1926, the village was named Khorinsk.
