= Khorinsky District =

Khorinsky District Хоринский район (Russian)
- District

Other transcription(s)
  - Buryat: Хориин аймаг
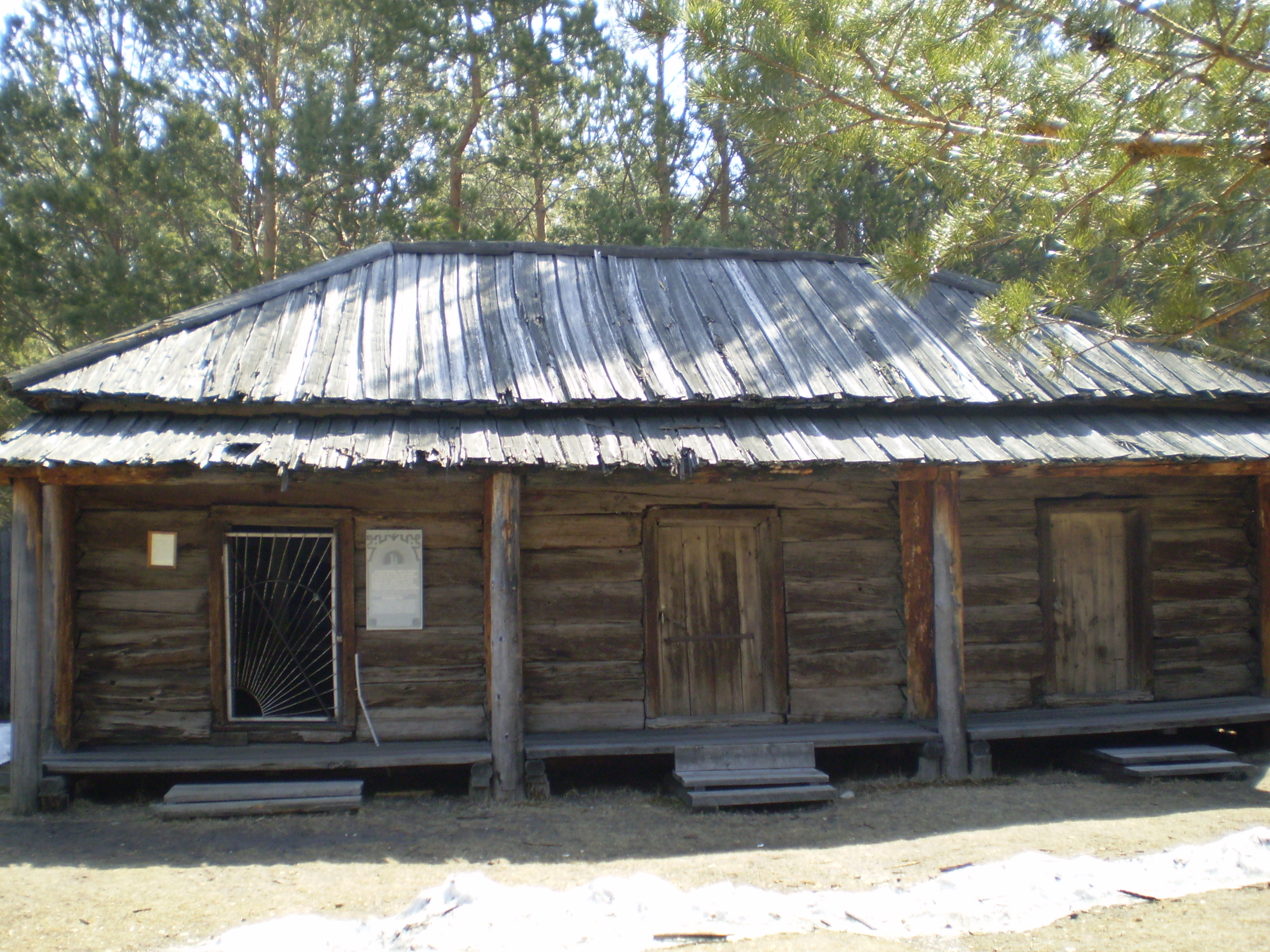
- Barn for the night for exiles, Khorinsky District

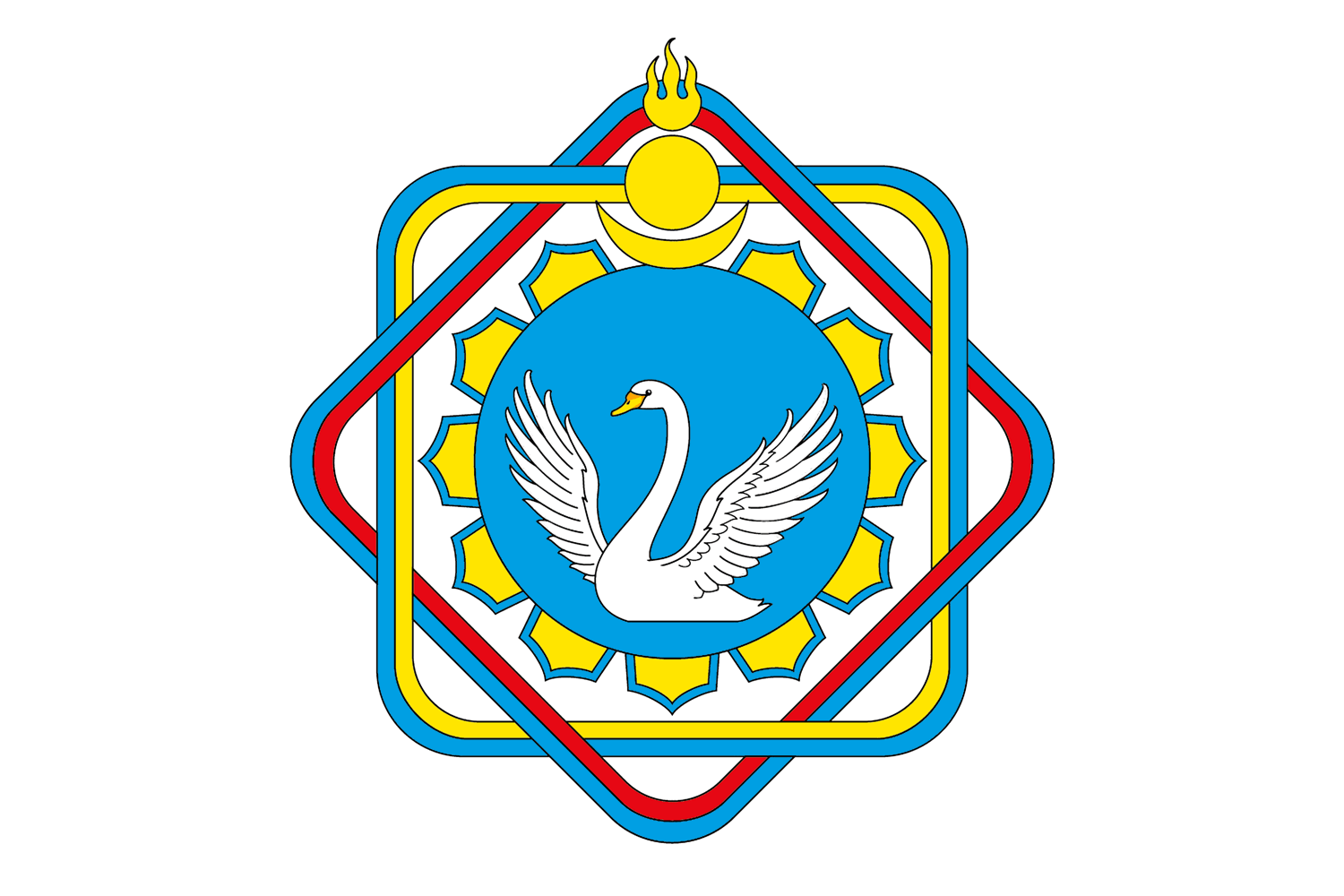
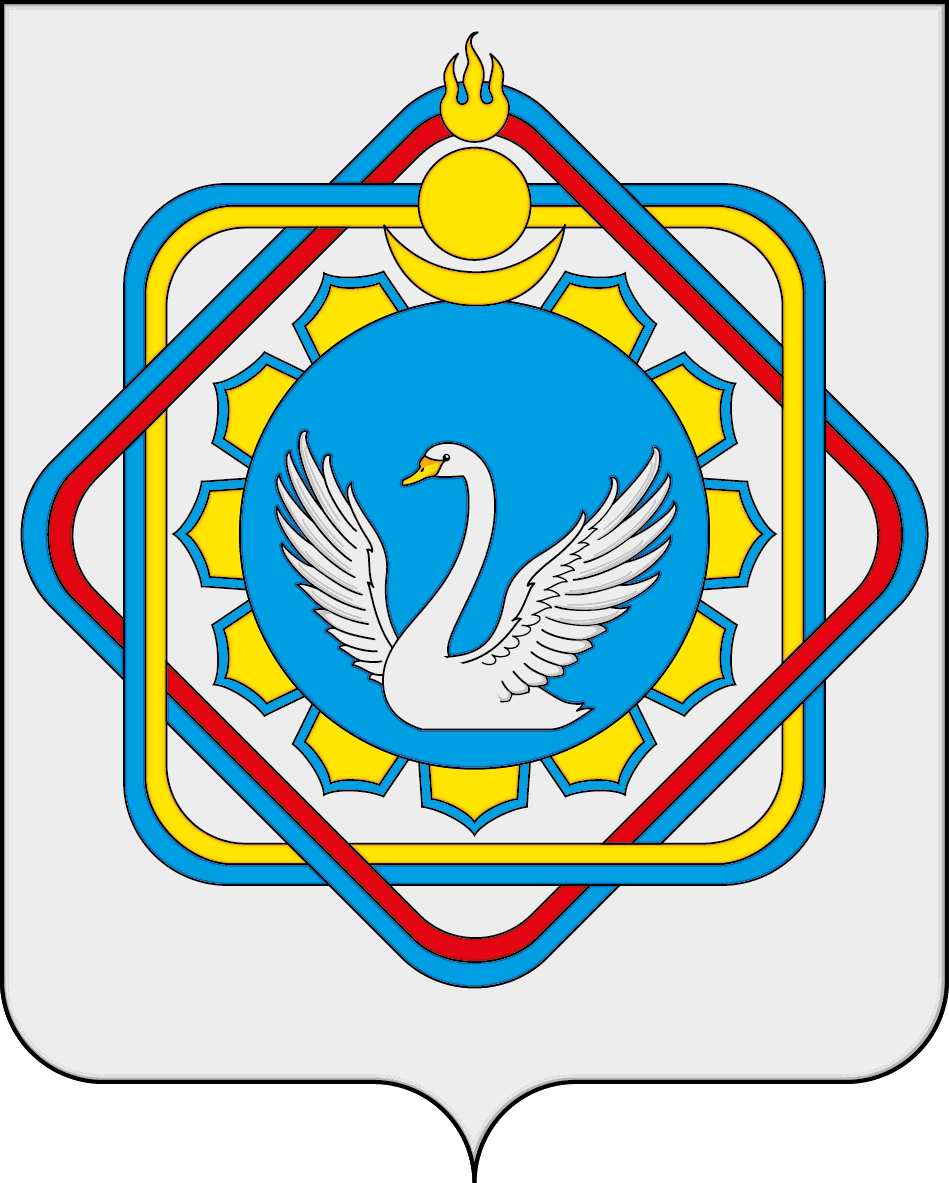
- Flag Coat of arms
- Location of Khorinsky District in the Buryat Republic
- Coordinates: 52°10′N 109°46′E
- Country: Russia
- Federal subject: Republic of Buryatia
- Established: November 1923
- Administrative center: Khorinsk

Area
  - Total: 13,431 km^{2} (5,186 sq mi)

Population (2010 Census)
  - Total: 18,467
  - Density: 1.3750/km^{2} (3.5611/sq mi)
  - Urban: 0%
  - Rural: 100%

Administrative structure
  - Administrative divisions: 7 Selsoviets, 3 Somons
  - Inhabited localities: 27 rural localities

Municipal structure
  - Municipally incorporated as: Khorinsky Municipal District
  - Municipal divisions: 0 urban settlements, 9 rural settlements
- Time zone: UTC+8 (MSK+5)
- OKTMO ID: 81657000
- Website: http://admhrn.sdep.ru

Population of Khorinsky District
- 2010 Census: 18,467
- 2002 Census: 19,367
- 1989 Census: 22,870
- 1979 Census: 21,452

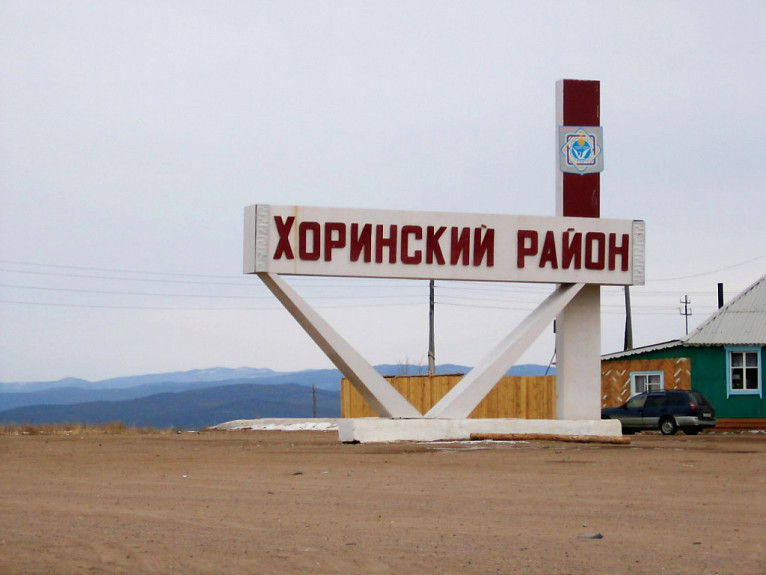
Stele at the entrance to the Khorinsky district. Buryatia, Russia

Khorinsky District (Russian: Хо́ринский райо́н; Buryat: Хориин аймаг, Khoriin aimag) is an administrative and municipal district (raion), one of the twenty-one in the Republic of Buryatia, Russia. It is located in the center of the republic. The area of the district is 13,431 square kilometers (5,186 sq mi). Its administrative center is the rural locality (a selo) of Khorinsk. As of the 2010 Census, the total population of the district was 18,467, with the population of Khorinsk accounting for 44.1% of that number.

== History ==
The district was established in November 1923.

== Administrative and municipal status ==
Within the framework of administrative divisions, Khorinsky District is one of the twenty-one in the Republic of Buryatia. The district is divided into seven selsoviets and three somons, which comprise twenty-seven rural localities. As a municipal division, the district is incorporated as Khorinsky Municipal District. Its seven selsoviets and three somons are incorporated as nine rural settlements within the municipal district. The selo of Khorinsk serves as the administrative center of both the administrative and municipal district.
