= Pribaikalsky National Park =

National park of Russia

- Прибайкальский (Russian)
- IUCN category II (national park)
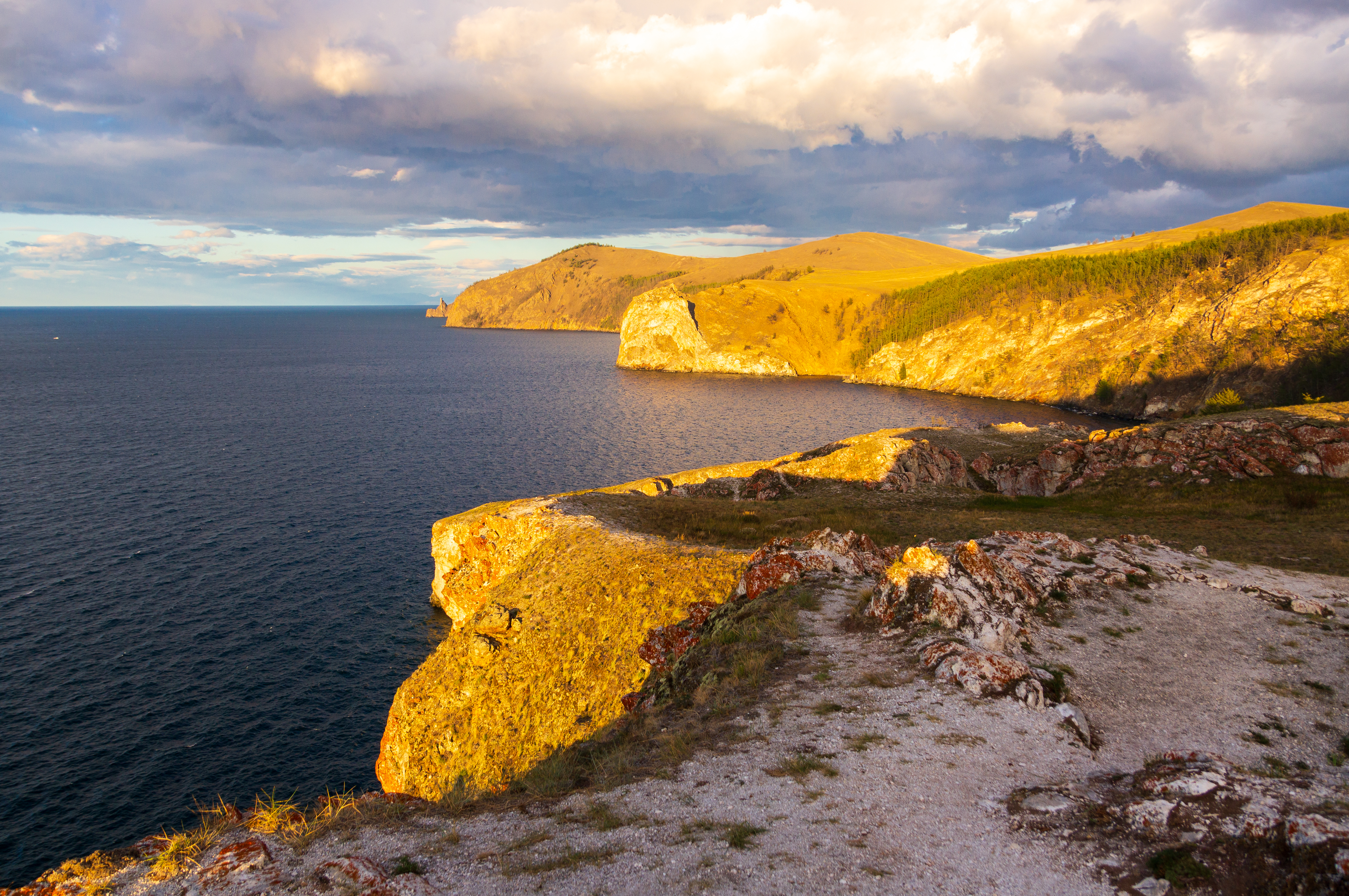
- Olkhon Coast, Pribaikalsky National Park

- Location within Russia
- Location: Irkutsk Oblast
- Nearest city: Irkutsk
- Coordinates: 51°51′N 104°53′E
- Area: 417,300 hectares (1,031,171 acres; 4,173 km^{2}; 1,611 sq mi)
- Established: 1986
- Visitors: 400,000
- Governing body: FGBU Zapovedoe Baikal
- Website: http://baikal-1.ru/

Pribaikalsky National Park (also spelled Pribaykalski, Russian: Прибайкальский национальный парк) covers the southwest coast of Lake Baikal in southeastern Siberia. The coastal strip includes the lake-facing slopes of the Primorsky Range to the west, as well as offshore islands such as Olkhon Island to the east. It is about 50 km southeast of the city of Irkutsk, Irkutsk Oblast. The park is managed with three other nature reserves, and is a major component of the UNESCO World Heritage Site "Lake Baikal". The Angara River, which is the outflow of Lake Baikal west into the Yenisei River basin, runs through the park. The park has very high levels of biodiversity and endemic species.

== Topography ==
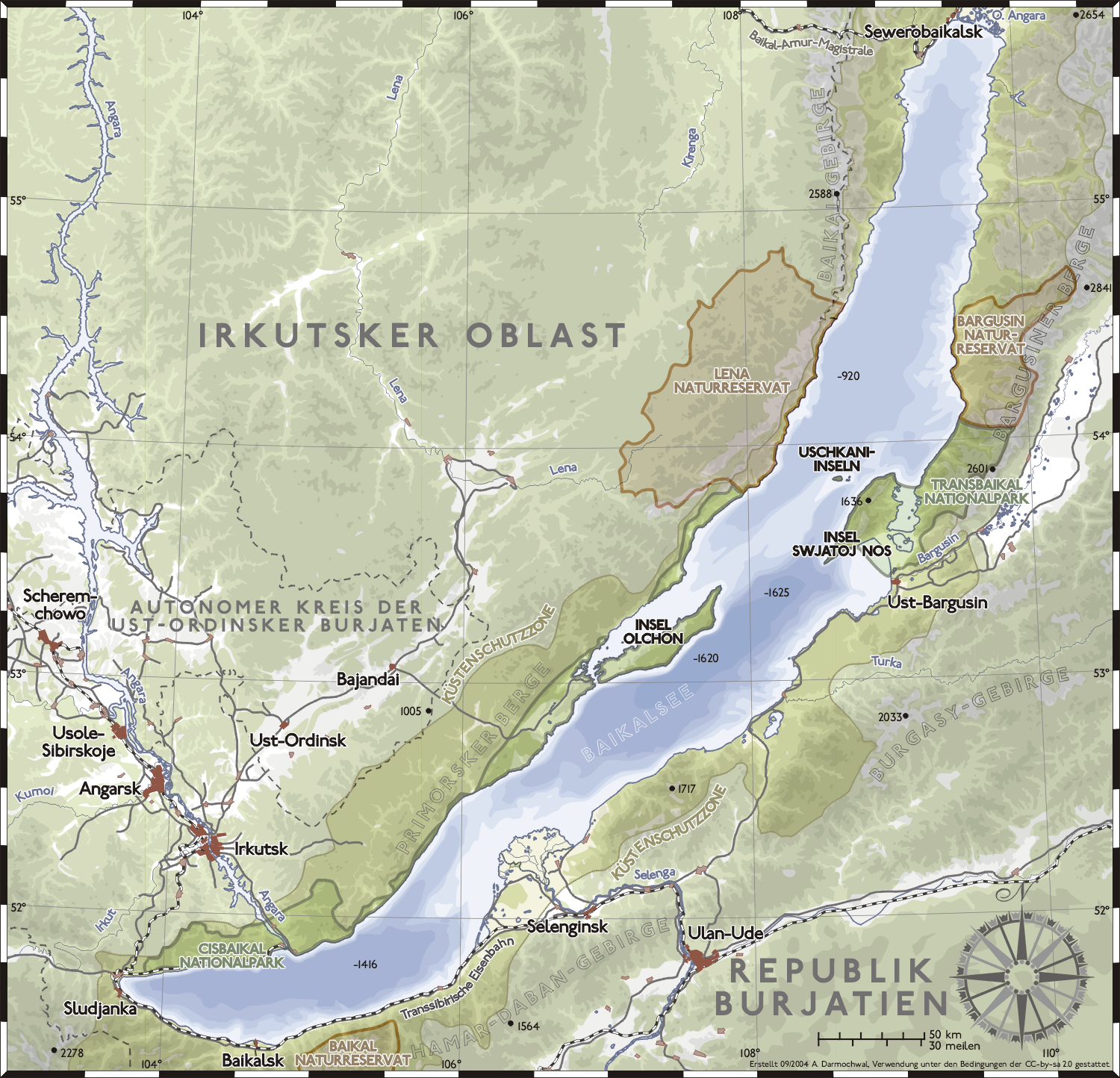
Protected Areas of Lake Baikal. Pribaikalsky NP is dark area on west coast; Baikal-Lensky Reserve north of Pribaikalsky on the same coast.

As a coastal strip and the base of the mountains west of the lake, the terrain is marked by uniform distribution of small, mountainous rivers (under 10 km each). Four rivers exceed 25 km in length. There are 150 permanent streams and rivers in the park, 60 of which flow into the lake. The streams and lakes are rain-fed and are of low salinity, with the exception of 20 karst and steppe lakes. Besides the Angara, another significant river is the Sarma River, (the source of the "Sarma (wind)" which has been recorded at 90 mph). There are only a few marshes, found in the low floodplains.

Mountains rise to the west of the lake, reaching heights of 1,100 meters in the south and 1,500 meters in the north. Olkhon Island is the fourth-largest lake-bound island in the world. It is 71 km long and 21 km wide, with a total area of 730 km2. It has little surface water, and only one lake on the island. It is forested, but receives little rain (on average 10 inches per year.)

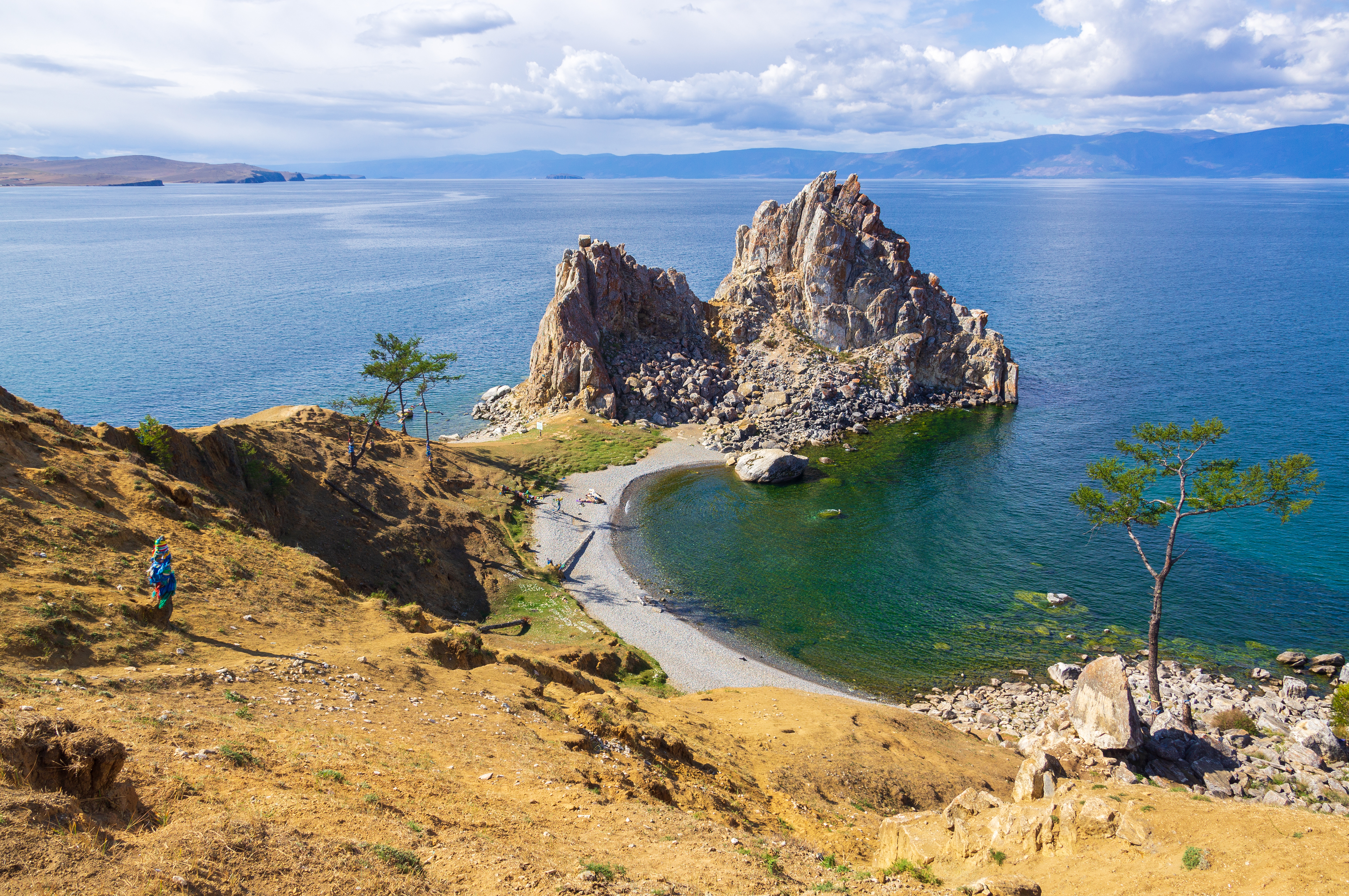
Shaman Rock, Olkhon Island

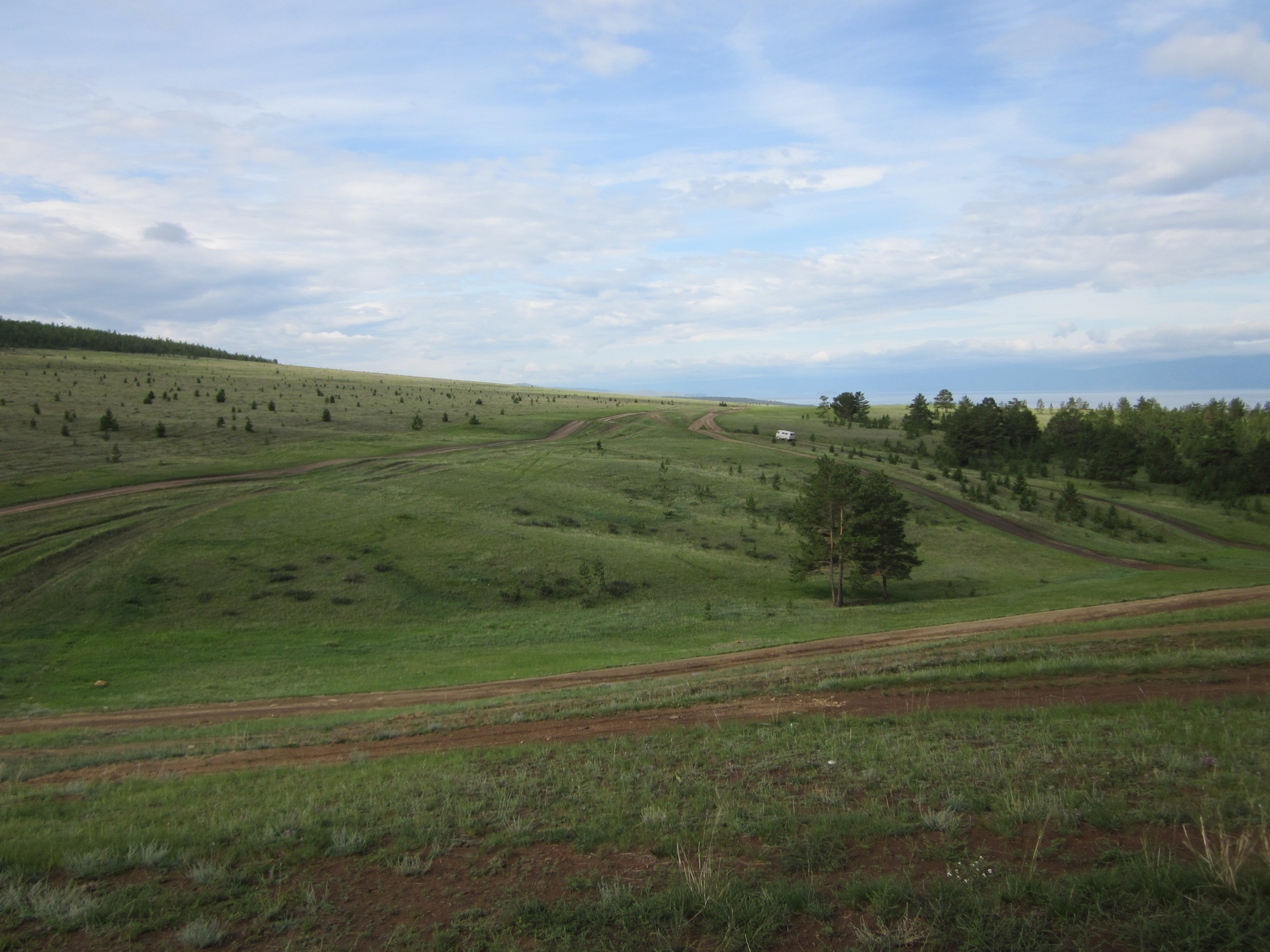
Interior of Olkhon Island, which is 730 km2

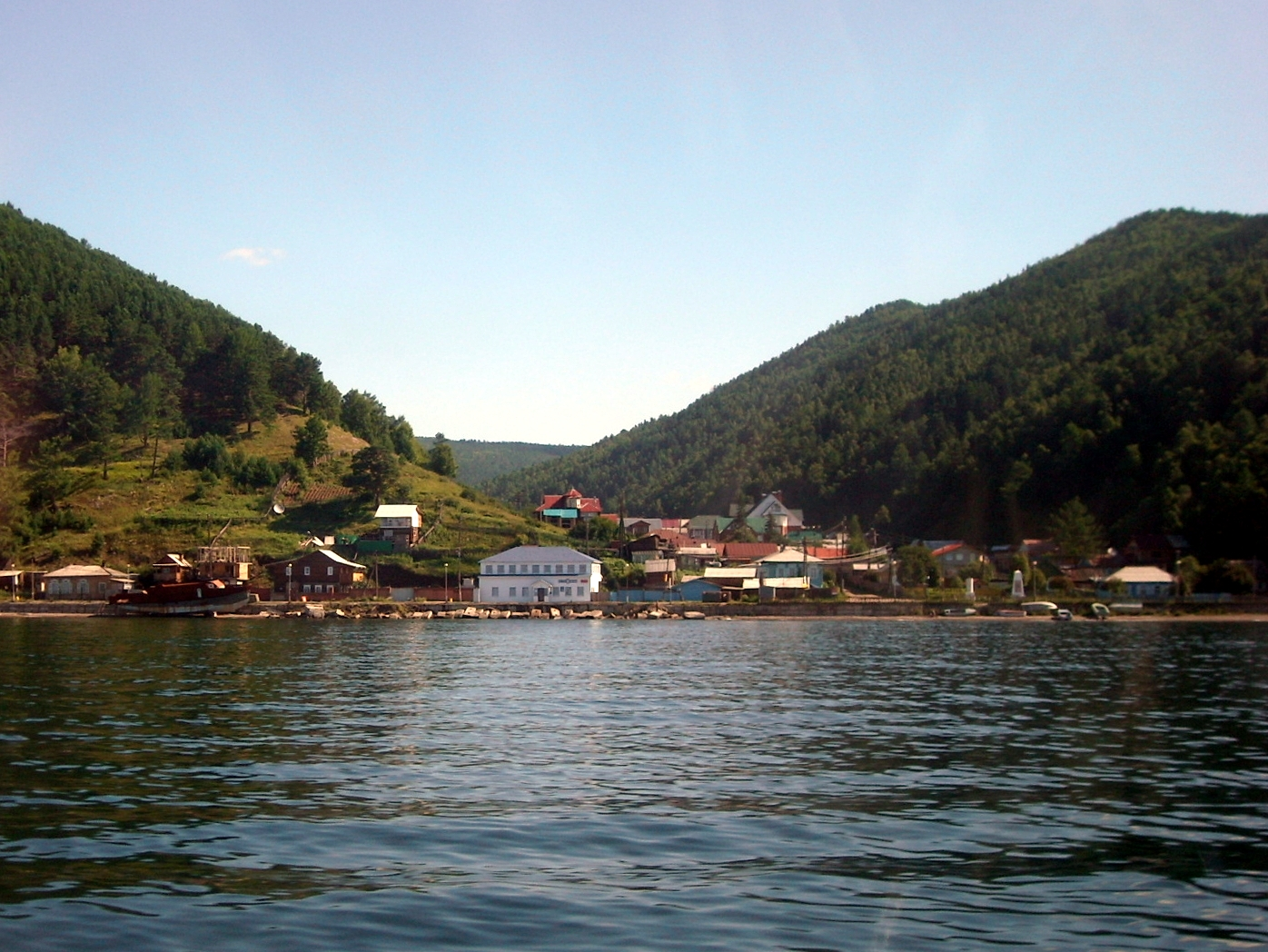
Listvyanka, at outlet to the Angara River

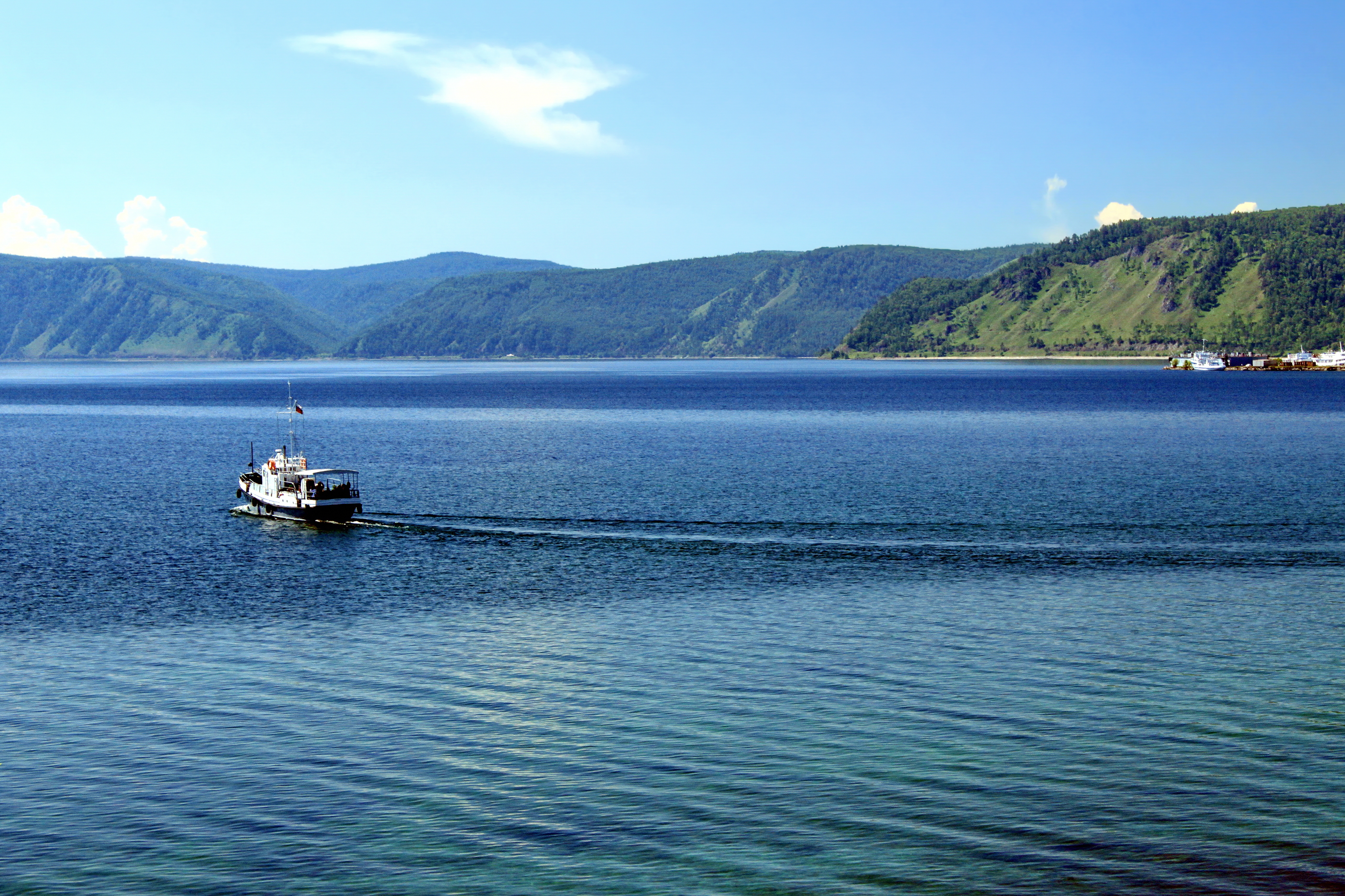
View of Lake Baikal from Listvyanka

== Ecoregion and climate ==
Pribaikalsky is at the southern central extreme of the East Siberian taiga (WWF ID #601), a large ecoregion covering most of central Siberia. The ecoregion is characterized by subarctic temperatures (trees are deciduous and coniferous), continental temperature (high variation among four seasons), and long winters that are dry (due to the Siberian anticyclone). Pribaikalsky is at the high end of the ecoregion for precipitation, with 24 inches per year (averages for the ecoregion run from 8 to 24 inches per year.)

For aquatic habitat, the park is in the "Lake Baikal" freshwater ecoregion (WWF ID#601), a region that covers the immediate drainage basin of the lake. The water of the lake itself is characterized by oxygen saturation over 70% (even at maximum depths), high levels of clarity, and low calcium. Ice cover lasts from January–February to May each year. Olkhon Island has relatively little surface water.

The climate of Pribaikalsky is moderate continental (Köppen climate classification Dwb), characterized by four distinct seasons, high variance between winter and summer temperatures, long dry winters, and short, warm and rainy summers. Average temperatures range from -10 F in January to +67 F in July. Annual precipitation averages 24.5 inches.

Pribaikalsky National Park, Irkutsk Oblast, Russia

Climate chart (precipitation, max. and min. temperature)
J	F	M	A	M	J	J	A	S	O	N	D
0.3 0 −20	0.2 9 −15	0.3 28 2	0.6 47 24	1 63 36	2.3 74 48	3.8 78 56	3.4 73 52	1.8 60 38	0.7 44 23	0.6 21 2	0.5 4 −14
- █ Average max. and min. temperatures in °F
- █ Precipitation totals in inches
- Source: GlobalSpecies.org
Metric conversion
J	F	M	A	M	J	J	A	S	O	N	D
7.6 −18 −29	5.1 −13 −26	7.6 −2 −17	15 9 −5	25 17 2	58 24 9	97 26 13	86 23 11	46 16 3	18 7 −5	15 −6 −17	13 −16 −26
- █ Average max. and min. temperatures in °C
- █ Precipitation totals in mm

== Plants ==
The slopes of the mountains facing Lake Baikal are forested with steppe pine and larch. The wetter tops of the mountains are Siberian pine-fir, and in the valleys the tree cover is typically spruce, larch, alder, aspen, and birch. Biodiversity and endemism is extremely high: the park and adjacent areas have recorded 1,385 species and subspecies of vascular plants, 339 species of mosses, 676 species and sub-species of lichens and 655 species of fungi. Of these, 557 are endemic to the park.

== Animals ==
As with plants, the biodiversity of animals in the park is high. Over 2,500 species have been recorded, many of which are endemic. The park records 220 species of terrestrial vertebrates. The ungulates are typical of the Siberian taiga: Caspian deer, Siberian roe deer and moose. The carnivores include sables, Siberian weasels, and ermines. The steppe sections of the park are home to steppe polecats, long-tailed sousliks (a type of ground squirrel), meadow larks, and black kites. In hard-to-reach rocks and on the islands, there are rock doves and Siberian swifts. The largest mammal in the lake itself is the Baikal seal.

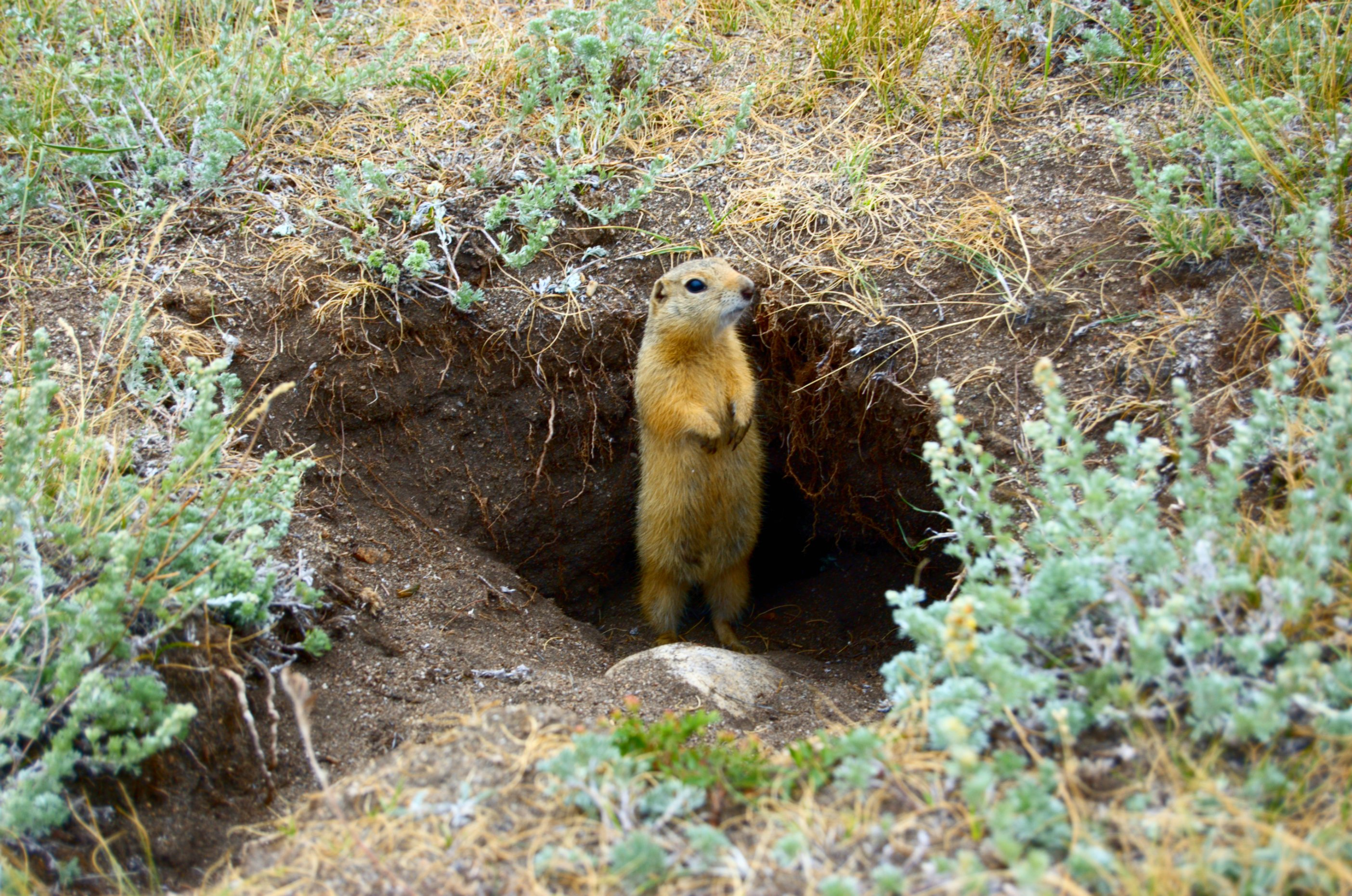
Ground squirrel on Olkhon Island

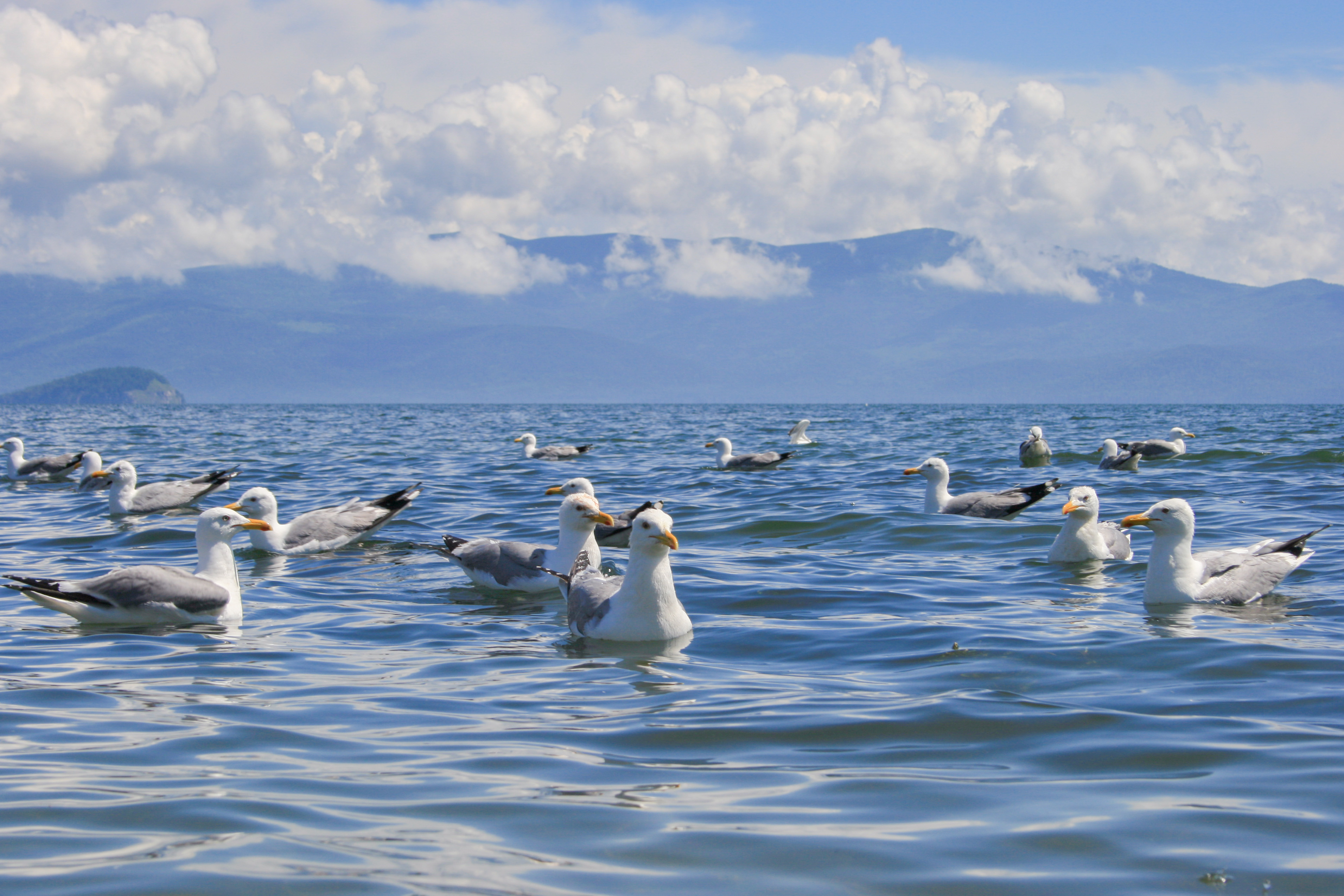
Mongolian herring gulls on Lake Baikal

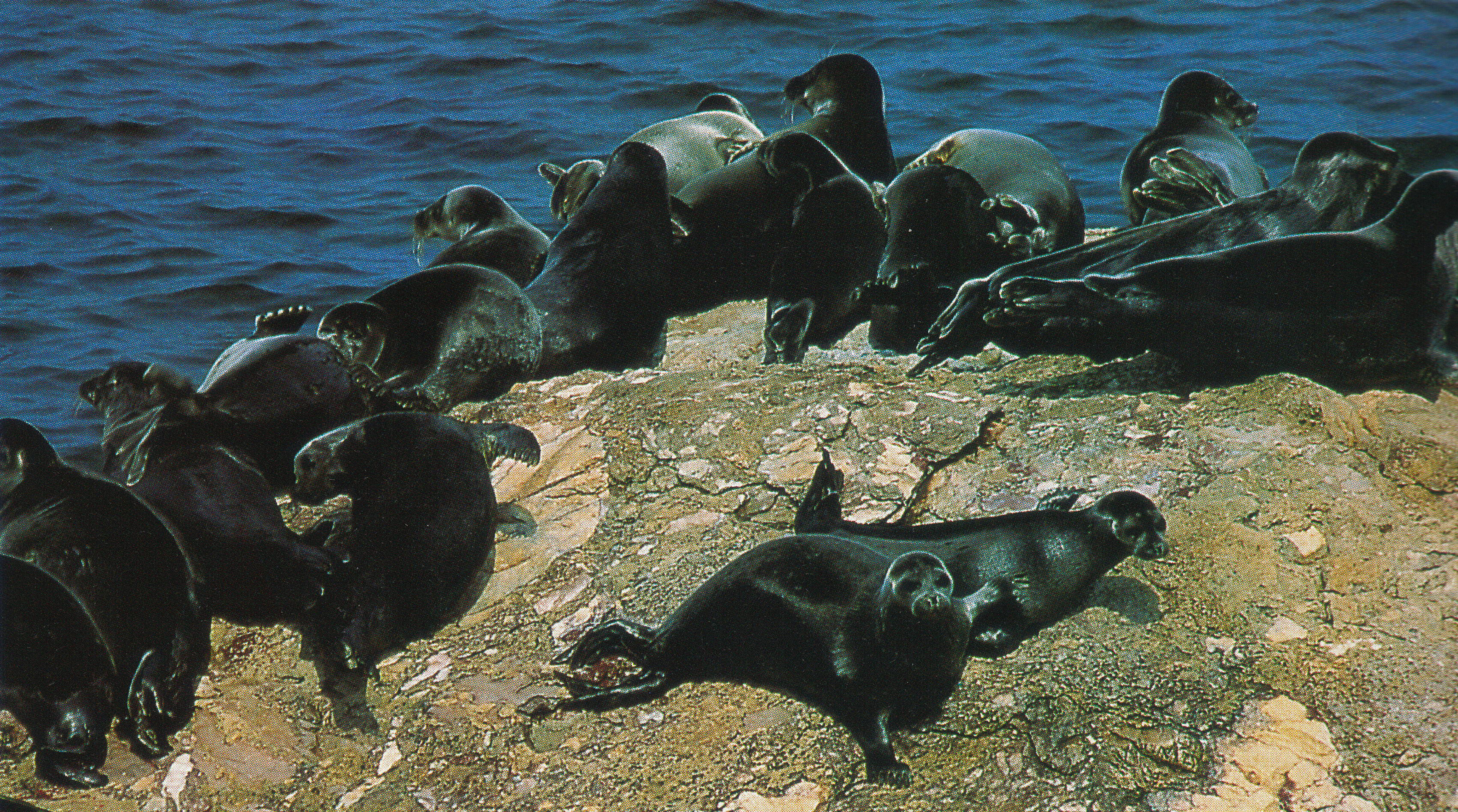
Baikal seal, endemic to Lake Baikal

== History ==
The site of the park has been inhabited since ancient times, with the greatest concentration of archaeological sites along the lake. Today, there are 1,500 Buryats, the indigenous people, living on Olkhon island. Pribiakalsky National Park and Baikal-Lensky Nature Reserve ('Zapovednik') were created in 1986, and were placed under common management of "FGBU Zapovednoe Baikal". As with many Russian National Parks, there are a few small settlements within the park, such as Bolshie Koty on the lake.

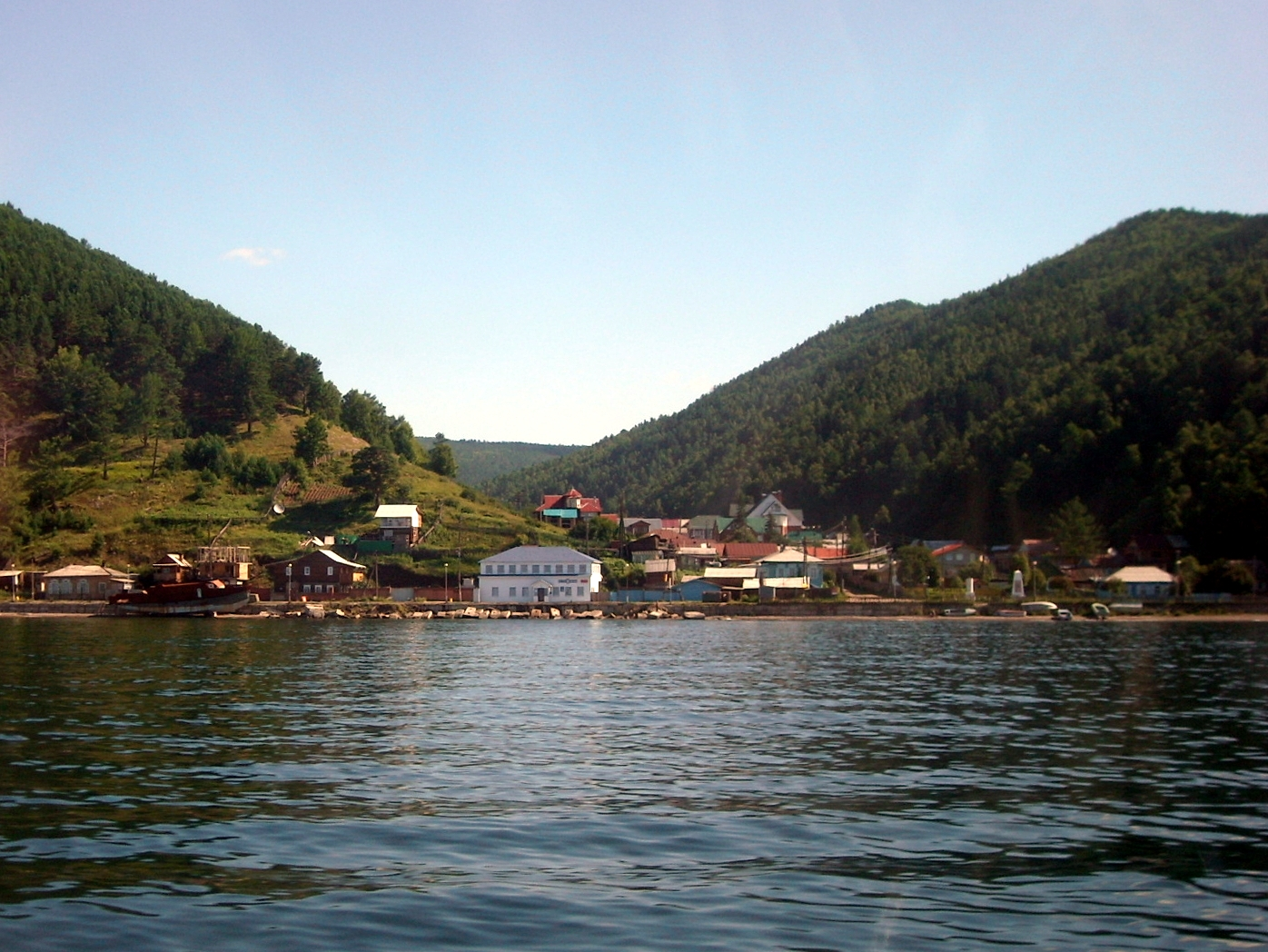
Listvyanka, a settlement on the outlet to the Angara River

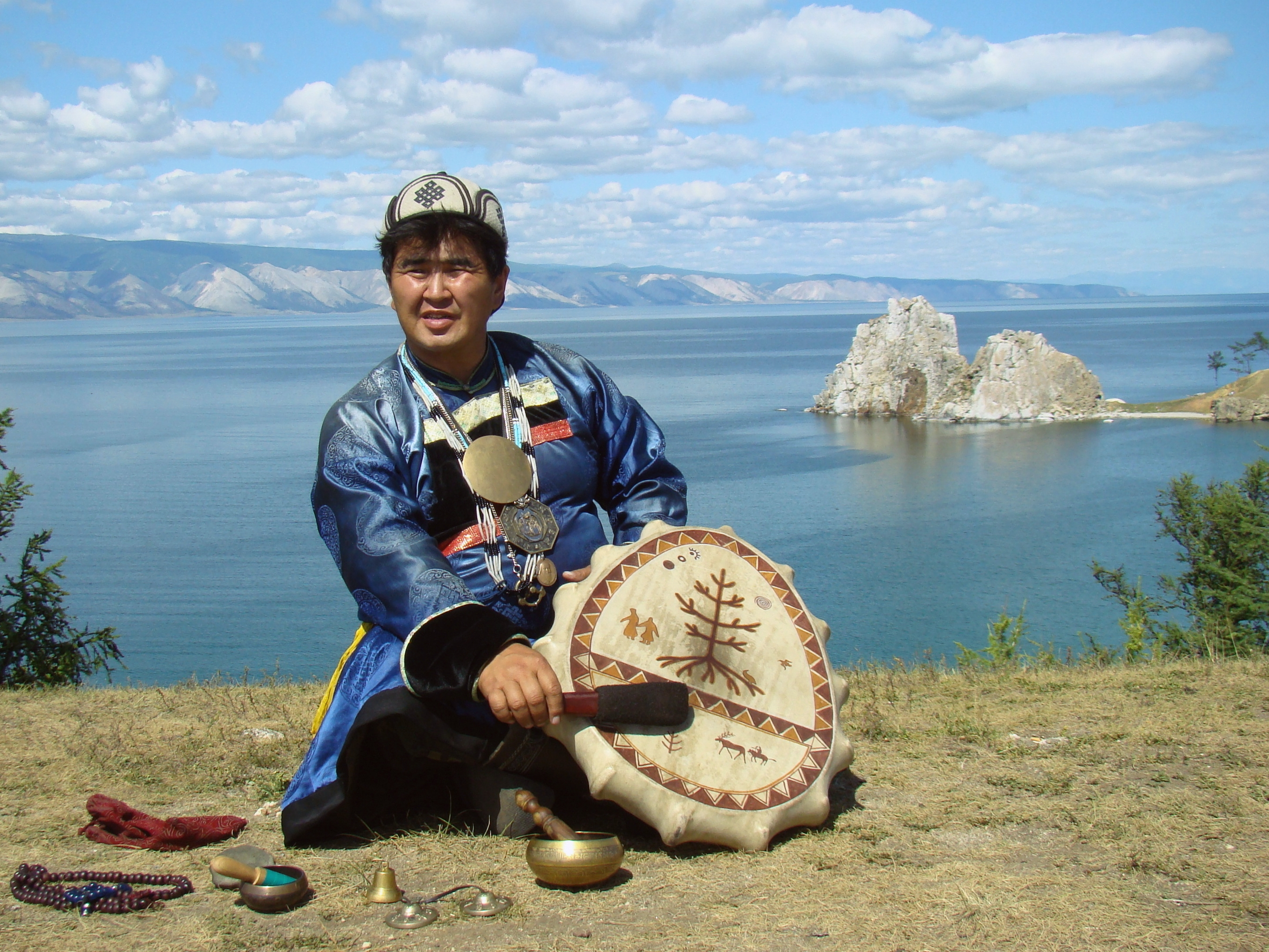
Buryat shaman on Olkhon Island

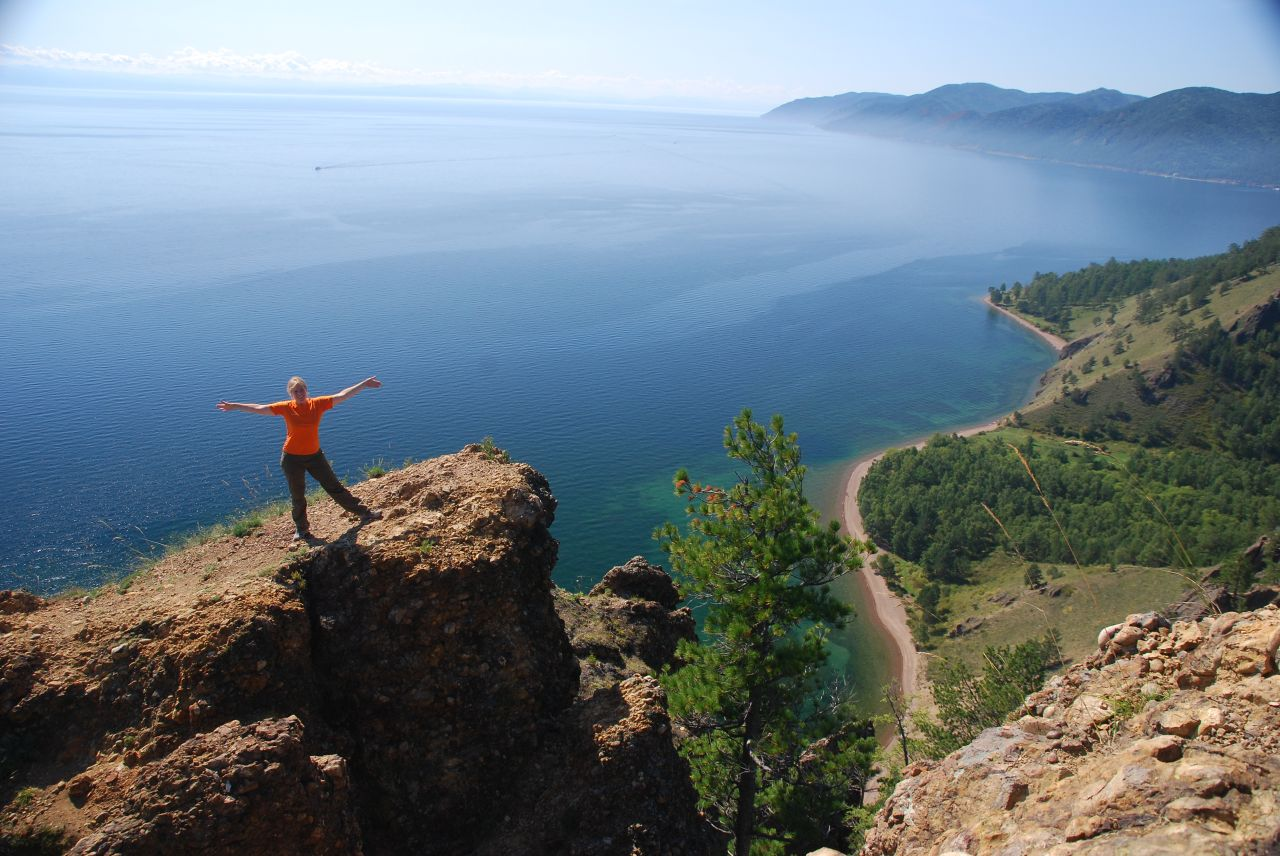
Trail Overlook, Lake Baikal

== Tourism ==
Pribaikalsky receives the majority of tourists, foreign and domestic, due to Lake Baikal (over 400,000 per year overall). The need to balance the recreational load with the conservation of nature is a large part of the park's mission. The park is open year-round. Buses and ferries into the park at Listvyanka are available in Irkutsk, and there is a ferry to Olkhon Island. Four settlements in the park have hotels and facilities, and there is a museum near Listvyanka. The 'Great Baikal Trail' runs along the west coast of the lake through Pribaikalsky; during the winter, the trail loop is open for skates, skis, and snowmobiles for tourists to view the ice formations.

== See also ==
- Protected areas of Russia
- Lake Baikal
