= Pribaykalsky =

Pribaykalsky (masculine), Pribaykalskaya (feminine), or Pribaykalskoye (neuter) may refer to:

- Pribaykalsky District, a district of the Republic of Buryatia, Russia
- Pribaykalsky National Park, a national park in Irkutsk Oblast, Russia
