= Maloe More =

Strait in Lake Baikal, Russia

Coordinates: 53.25°N 107.25028°E

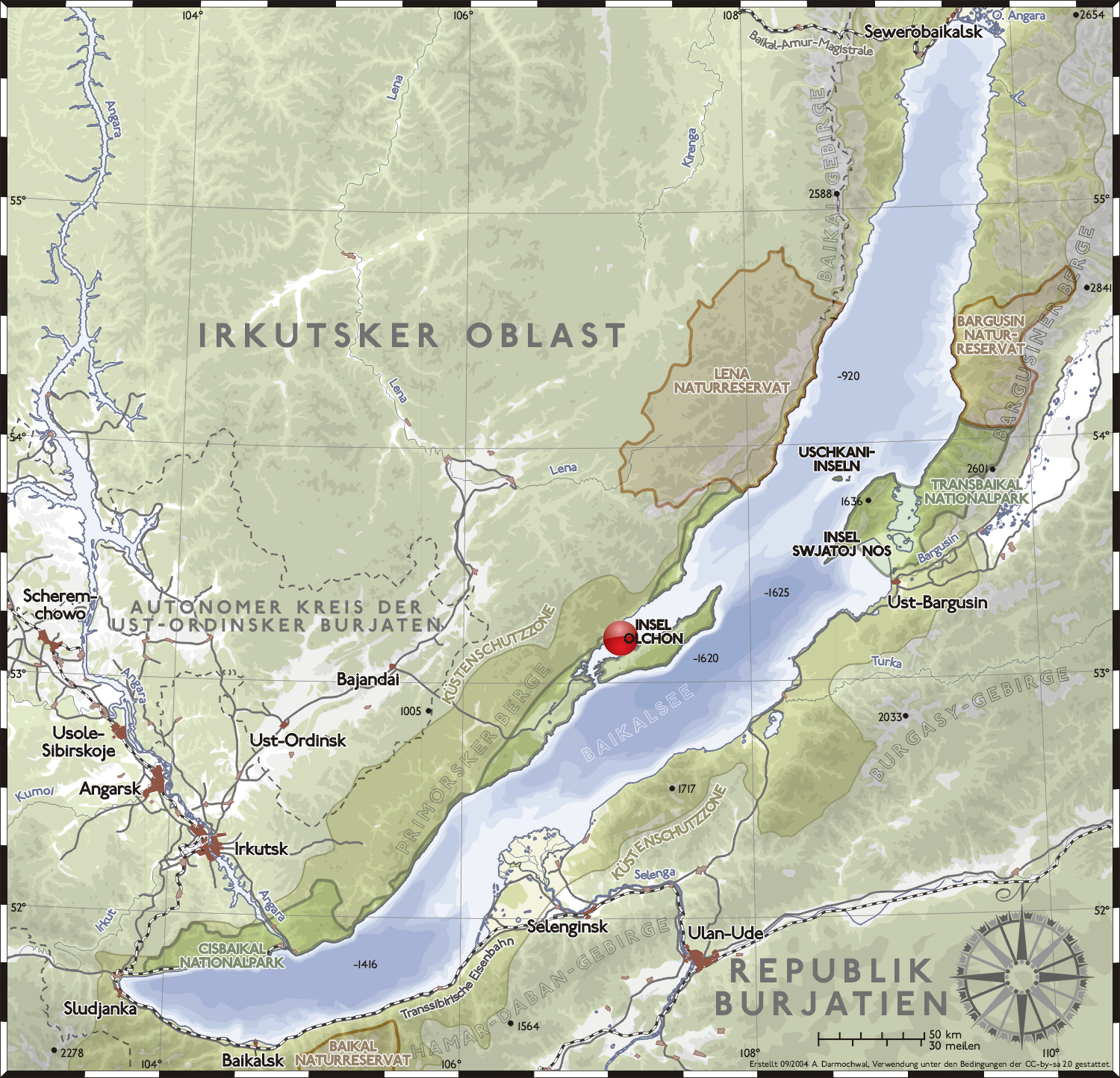
A map of Baikal

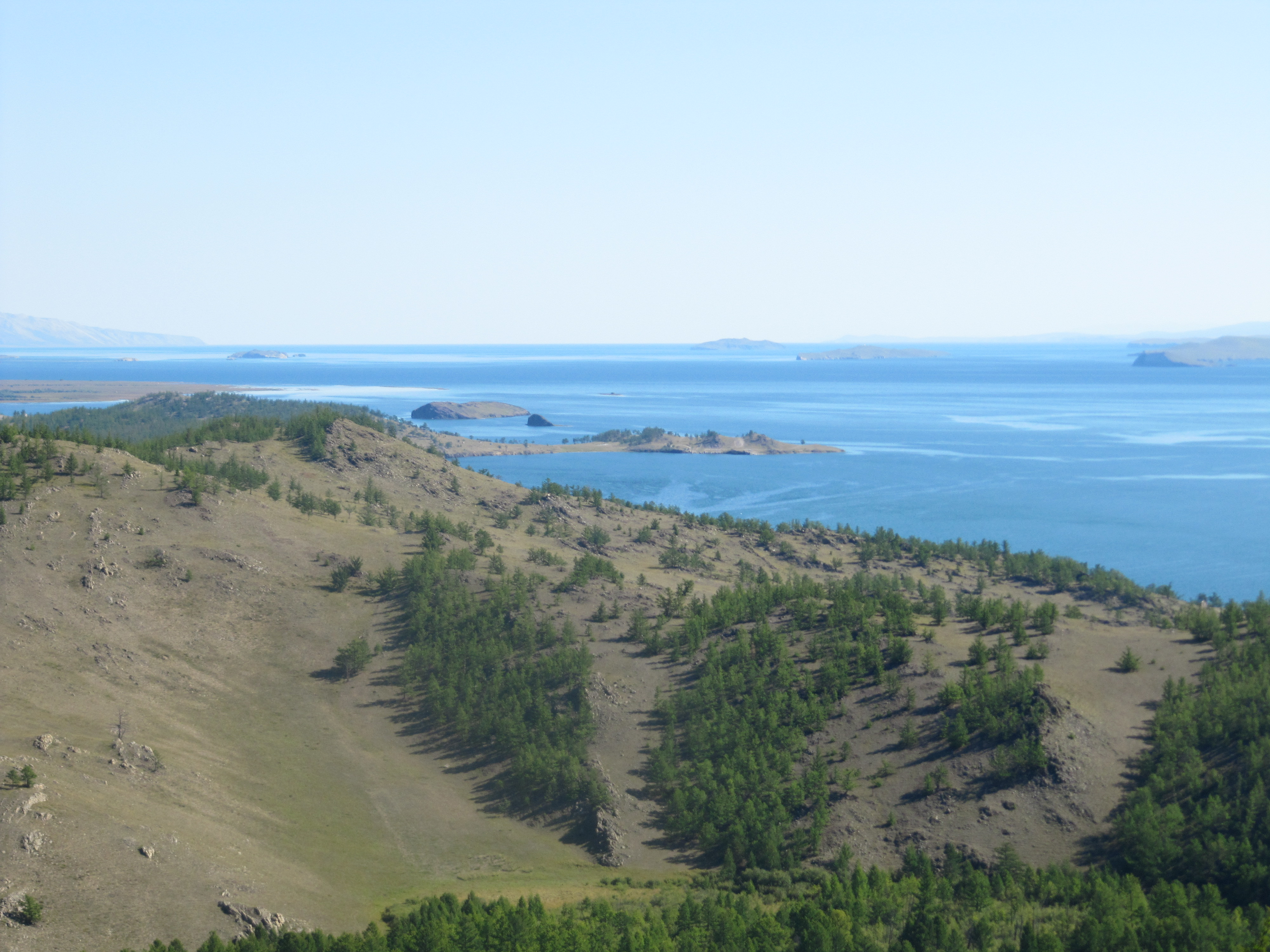
Maloe More as seen from Sarma River

Maloe More (Russian: Малое Море; in English literally the Small Sea) is a strait in Lake Baikal, Russia. It separates the largest island of the lake, Olkhon Island, from the western shore of Baikal. The length of the strait is about 70 km and width 5 – 16 km. The maximum depth is 210 m in the northern part where the strait opens to the open Baikal. In the south, Maloe More strait is connected through the narrow Olkhon Gate strait to the central part of the lake. The Tryokhgolovy Golets, highest peak of the Primorsky Range, rises on the continental side of the strait.

The waters of Maloe More are heated up to 20-25 degrees Celsius during summer.

Maloe More is rich in fish. It is inhabited by sturgeon, golomyanka, Baikal omul, grayling, whitefish, perch and pike.

The islands of Ogoy, Zamogoy, Izhilhey, Oltrec and Khibin, are located in the Maloe More. The rivers Sarma, Kurma, etc. flow into the Small Sea.

The strait is a result of millions of years of tectonic movement, resulting in the hollowing of the channel between the land and the block of stone forming the Olkhon Island.
