= Sarma =

Sarma may refer to:

- Sarma (given name), a Latvian given name
- Sarma (food), a dish found primarily in the cuisines of the Middle East and Eastern Europe
- Sarma (Tibetan Buddhism), three newest schools of Tibetan Buddhism
- Sarma Cave, karst cave in the Georgia
- Sarma (river), Russia, flowing into Lake Baikal
- Sarma (wind), northern wind found at Lake Baikal
- Spelling variant of Sharma, surname in India
- Sarma (hat), a cone-shaped metallic headdress originated in Algiers
