= Mañjuśrīnāmasamgīti =

Buddhist tantra

The Mañjuśrī-Nāma-Saṃgīti (Tibetan: འཇམ་དཔལ་མཚན་བརྗོད, Wylie: 'jam dpal mtshan brjod) (hereafter, Nama-samgiti) is considered amongst the most advanced teachings given by the Shakyamuni Buddha. It represents the pinnacle of all Shakyamuni Buddha's teachings, being a tantra of the nondual (advaya) class, along with the Kalachakra Tantra.

The Nama-samgiti was preached by Shakyamuni Buddha for his disciple Vajrapani and his wrathful retinue in order to lead them into buddhahood. The essence of the Nama-samgiti is that Manjushri bodhisattva is the embodiment of all knowledge. The Nama-samgiti is a short text, only circa 160 verses and a prose section. It is a fraction of the vast Sutras such as Avatamsaka Sutra and Prajñāpāramitā Sutras or the endless ocean of tantras such as manjushri-mula-kalpa and the mountainous Hinayana teachings and sea of sundry extra-canonical works. And yet, the Nama-samgiti contains all of the Buddha's dharmas. It summarizes everything he taught. As Shakyamuni Buddha says of the Nāma-samgīti, it is "the chief clarification of words" and embodies the "nondual reality". Therefore, all sentient beings should definitely study and recite the Mañjuśrī-nāmasamgīti.

== Overview and Significance ==
The Nāma-samgīti occupies a unique position in Mahāyāna and Vajrayāna literature as a concise synthesis of the entire Buddhist path, viewed traditionally as an epitome of all the Buddha's teachings. Rather than presenting separate practices, the text is understood to distill the essential doctrines of both the Sūtra and Tantra vehicles into a litany of sacred names celebrating ultimate wisdom (prajñā).

Because of this comprehensive doctrinal status, the text holds a foundational position across all major Tibetan Buddhist lineages, where it is widely memorized, studied, and integrated into daily liturgical recitation.

Within the Tibetan Sarma (New Translation) traditions—such as the Gelug, Sakya, and Kagyu schools—it is closely affiliated with the highest yoga tantras and is frequently studied alongside the Kalachakra Tantra. In the Nyingma (Ancient Translation) tradition, it holds strong ties to early Dzogchen exegesis through influential commentaries composed by early masters such as Mañjuśrīmitra.

== Structure and Content ==
The text consists of 13 chapters and approximately 167 verses. It begins with a prologue in which the bodhisattva Vajrapāṇi requests Shakyamuni Buddha to explain the true nature of Mañjuśrī's wisdom. The Buddha responds by revealing the litany of names, which systematically outline the Buddha families, the manifestation of the Vajradhatu mandala, and the nature of primordial awareness.

=== Chapter Outline ===
1. Request for Instruction (Verses 1–8) – Vajrapāṇi requests Shakyamuni Buddha to explain the names of wisdom.
2. Reply of the Buddha (Verses 9–15) – The Buddha consents and praises the litany of names.
3. Sixfold Contemplation (Verses 16–27) – The Buddha enters the samādhi of primordial awareness.
4. Illusion-Net Illusion Mandala (Verses 28–43) – The manifestation of the Vajradhatu mandala.
5. Great Wisdom Family (Verses 44–58) – Description of the primordial Buddha nature.
6. Dharmadhātu Wisdom (Verses 59–83) – Litany of the absolute nature of reality.
7. Mirror-like Wisdom (Verses 84–97) – Litany of reflective clarity.
8. Individualizing Wisdom (Verses 98–117) – Litany of discerning awareness.
9. Equalizing Wisdom (Verses 118–131) – Litany of non-discriminating equanimity.
10. All-Accomplishing Wisdom (Verses 132–146) – Litany of unhindered action.
11. Fivefold Wisdom Proclamation (Verses 147–156) – Summary of the five enlightened awarenesses.
12. Mantra Recitation (Verses 157–160) – Conclusion of the litany and core mantras.
13. Epilogue (Verses 161–167) – Praise, dedication, and benefits of recitation.

== Etymology, Nature of the "Names", and Two Levels of Meaning ==
- Etymology of Mañjuśrī: According to the Indian commentator Smṛti, mañju signifies "smooth" (being free from hard defilements / path of rejecting bad) and śrī signifies "glory" (gaining excellent merits / path of accepting good). Mañjughoṣa emphasizes the sound/expression aspect of teaching and purification.
- Definition of "Names" (Nāma): The "names" in the Saṃgīti are not vocative epithets; rather, each metrical foot represents a statement of fact or nominative characteristic expressing Mañjuśrī's inner nature ("You, Mañjuśrī, are...").
- Two Levels of Meaning:
  - Profound Meaning (Nītārtha / Absolute Truth): Expresses absolute reality, voidness (śūnyatā), nonduality, and the path "good in the beginning, middle, and end".
  - Broad Meaning (Neyārtha / Conventional Truth): Expresses conventional iconography, deity names, and ritual practice across the maṇḍalas to purify defilements.

== Philosophical Evolution of Mañjuśrī ==
- From Interlocutor to Primordial Buddha: Mañjuśrī evolved from an early interlocutor in Mahāyāna sūtras (e.g., Lotus Sūtra, Prajñāpāramitā) into the personification of the Perfection of Insight (Prajñāpāramitā, the "Mother of the Buddhas").
- Spiritual Progenitor: Mañjuśrī acts as both "mother" (insight/view) and "father" (skillful means/practice) of all Bodhisattvas. In the special doctrine of the Nāma-saṃgīti, he represents Buddhahood across infinite eons and is identified as the Primordial Buddha (Ādibuddha).

== The Seven Maṇḍalas ==
Commentators such as Smṛti associate the core chapters (Ch. IV–X) with seven distinct maṇḍalas representing iconographic and meditative visualizations:

Chapter & Wisdom	Central Deity / Aspect	Key Iconographic Characteristics
Ch. IV: Net of Illusion	Dharmadhātu-Vāgīśvara	White/golden Mañjughoṣa, 4 heads, 8 arms, seated on a lion.
Ch. V: Great Vajradhātu	Nāmasaṃgīti Mañjuśrī (central Mahāvairocana)	White/red, 3 heads (or 1 head), 4 arms holding sword, arrow, book, and bow.
Ch. VI: Pure Dharmadhātu	Arapacana	White/yellow-red, 1 head, 2 arms holding the sword of insight and book at chest.
Ch. VII: Mirrorlike	Trailokyavijaya / Vajrabhairava	Wrathful form (Vajrahūṃkāra), 6 faces, 6 eyes, 6 arms, taming obstacles.
Ch. VIII: Discriminative	Vādisiṃha	Saffron/red Mañjuśrī seated with Devī Sarasvatī, holding sword and book.
Ch. IX: Sameness	Vādirāj	Golden/red, seated on a lion, making the gesture of explaining the Dharma.
Ch. X: Procedure-of-Duty	Mañjuvajra	Red, 3 heads, 6 arms embracing his consort (Prajñā), holding bow, arrow, sword, lotus.

== Commentarial Traditions & Cross-Tantric Influence ==
- Six Lineages: By the 13th century in Tibet, six distinct commentarial lineages were recognized (as noted by Sakya Pandita).
- Classification:
  - Yogatantra Group: Includes commentaries by Smṛti (emphasising 7 maṇḍalas and Tathāgatagarbha theory) and Candrabhadrakīrti / Līlāvajra (6 maṇḍalas).
  - Anuttarayogatantra Group: Includes Kālacakra traditions (e.g., Narendrakīrti, Padma-dkar-po) and Father Tantra traditions (affiliated with Yamāri/Guhyasamāja).
- Connection to Other Tantras:
  - Hevajra Tantra: Celebrated master Nāro-pa quotes the Mañjuśrī-nāma-saṃgīti 53 times in his commentary Vajrapadasāra-saṃgraha-pañjikā to explain core Tantric concepts (such as the four seals, the four bodies, and the four joys).
  - Kālacakra Tantra: Studying the Nāma-saṃgīti is considered mandatory in Kālacakra practice; the Vimalaprabhā commentary explicitly states: "Whoever does not know the Nāma-saṃgīti does not know the knowledge body of Vajradhara".

== Translation History and Liturgical Benefits ==
- Tibetan Translation: Translated during the Later Diffusion (phyi dar) of Buddhism in Tibet by the master translator Rin-chen-bzaṅ-po and Indian paṇḍita Kamalagupta, later revised by Śoṅ Blo-gros brtan-pa. Rin-chen-bzaṅ-po strictly preserved a four-line, seven-syllable metrical structure to match the Sanskrit meter.
- Benefits of Recitation: A prose insertion titled the Six Cycles of Praise (Anuśaṃsā) outlines 195 distinct praises and promises benefits for reciting the text three times daily, including purification of negative karma, protection from all obstacles/demons, mental clarity, and swift realization of complete Buddhahood.

== Key Commentaries ==
Several major Indian and Tibetan scholars composed extensive commentaries on the text, including:

- Vilāsavajra (8th century), who authored the Nāmamantrārthāvalokinī, interpreting Mañjuśrī as the Ādibuddha.
- Mañjuśrīmitra, who wrote early tantric exegeses linking the text to Yogacara and Dzogchen perspectives.
- Rinchen Zangpo (10th–11th century), who produced the standard Tibetan translation widely used in daily monastic recitations.

== Alternative titles ==
- "manjushrijnanasattvasya-paramartha-namasamgiti" (full Sanskrit title) lit. "The chanting of the names of Manjushri, the embodiment of supreme knowledge"
- Āryamañjuśrīnāmasaṃgīti ཨཱརྱ་མཉྫུ་ཤྲཱི་ནཱ་མ་སཾ་གི་ཏི
- Tibetan: འཕགས་པ་འཇམ་དཔལ་གྱི་མཚན་ཡང་དག་པར་བརྗོད་པ
- Tibetan: འཕགས་པ་འཇམ་དཔལ་གྱི་དོན་དམ་པའི་མཚན་ཡང་དག་པར་བརྗོད་པ
- Tibetan: རྒྱུད་ཐམས་ཅད་ཀྱི་རྒྱལ་པོ་འཕགས་པ་འཇམ་དཔལ་གྱི་མཚན་ཡང་དག་པར་བརྗོད་པ, Wylie: rgyud thams cad kyi rgyal po 'phags pa 'jam dpal gyi mtshan yang dag par brjod pa

== See also ==
- Adi-Buddha – The concept of the primordial Buddha in Vajrayāna philosophy.
- Dzogchen – The core teachings of the Nyingma school linked to early commentaries on the text.
- Kālacakra – Highest Yoga Tantra tradition in which the study of the Nāma-saṃgīti is considered mandatory.
- Mañjuśrī – The Bodhisattva of Transcendent Wisdom and central figure of the litany.
- Mañjuśrī-mūla-kalpa – Another major tantric text centered on Mañjuśrī.
- Nānamantra – The litany of sacred names within tantric literature.
- Prajñāpāramitā – The Perfection of Wisdom literature and philosophical foundation of the text.
- Tibetan Buddhist canon – The collection of sacred texts containing the *Kanjur* and *Tenjur*.
- Vajradhatu – The Diamond Realm mandala mapped throughout the wisdom chapters.
- Vajrapāṇi – The interlocutor who requests the teaching from Shakyamuni Buddha.
