= Ogoy Island =

Island in Maloe More, Lake Baikal, Russia

Coordinates: 53°7′43″N 106°59′56″E

Ogoy остров Огой
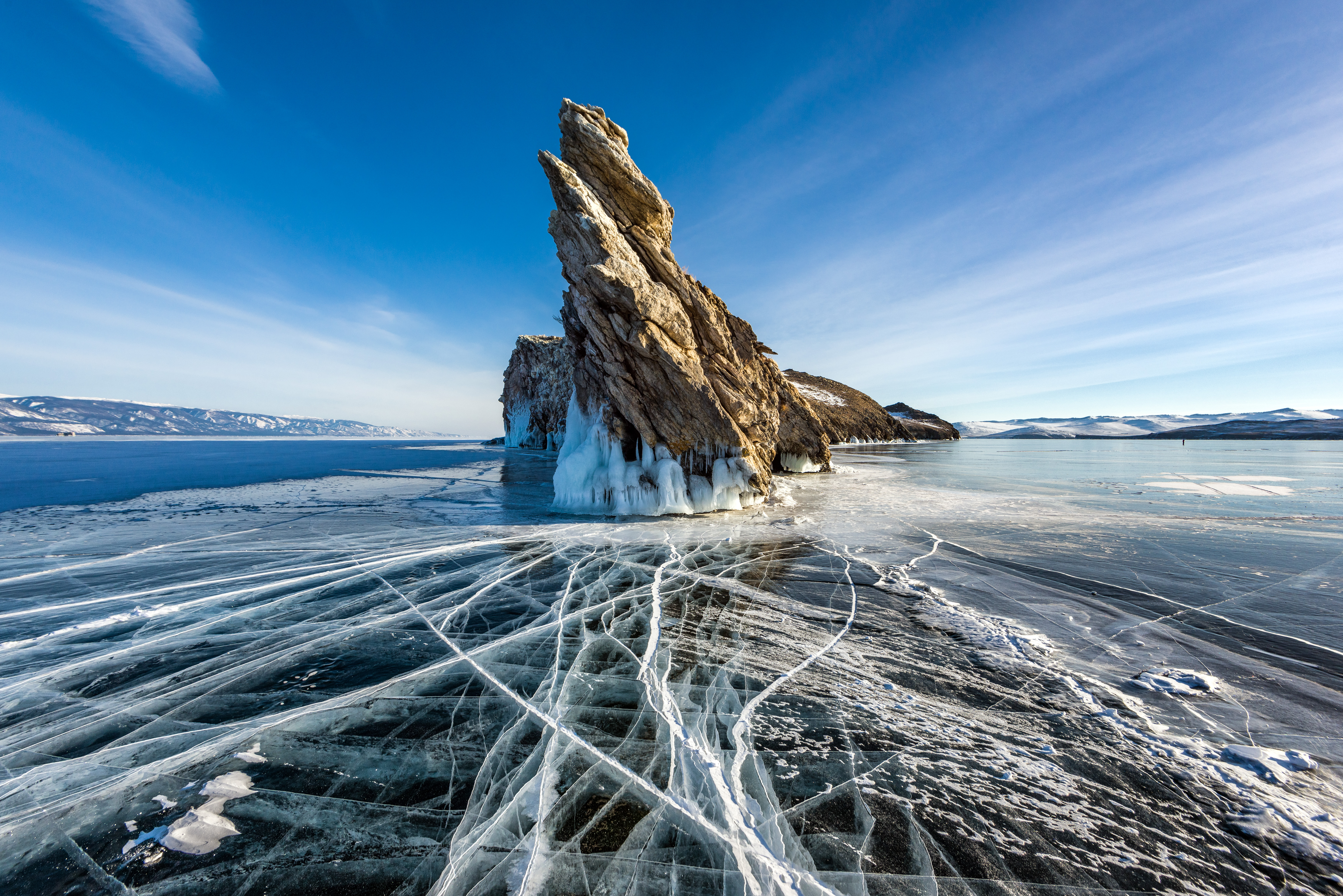
- Ogoy Island

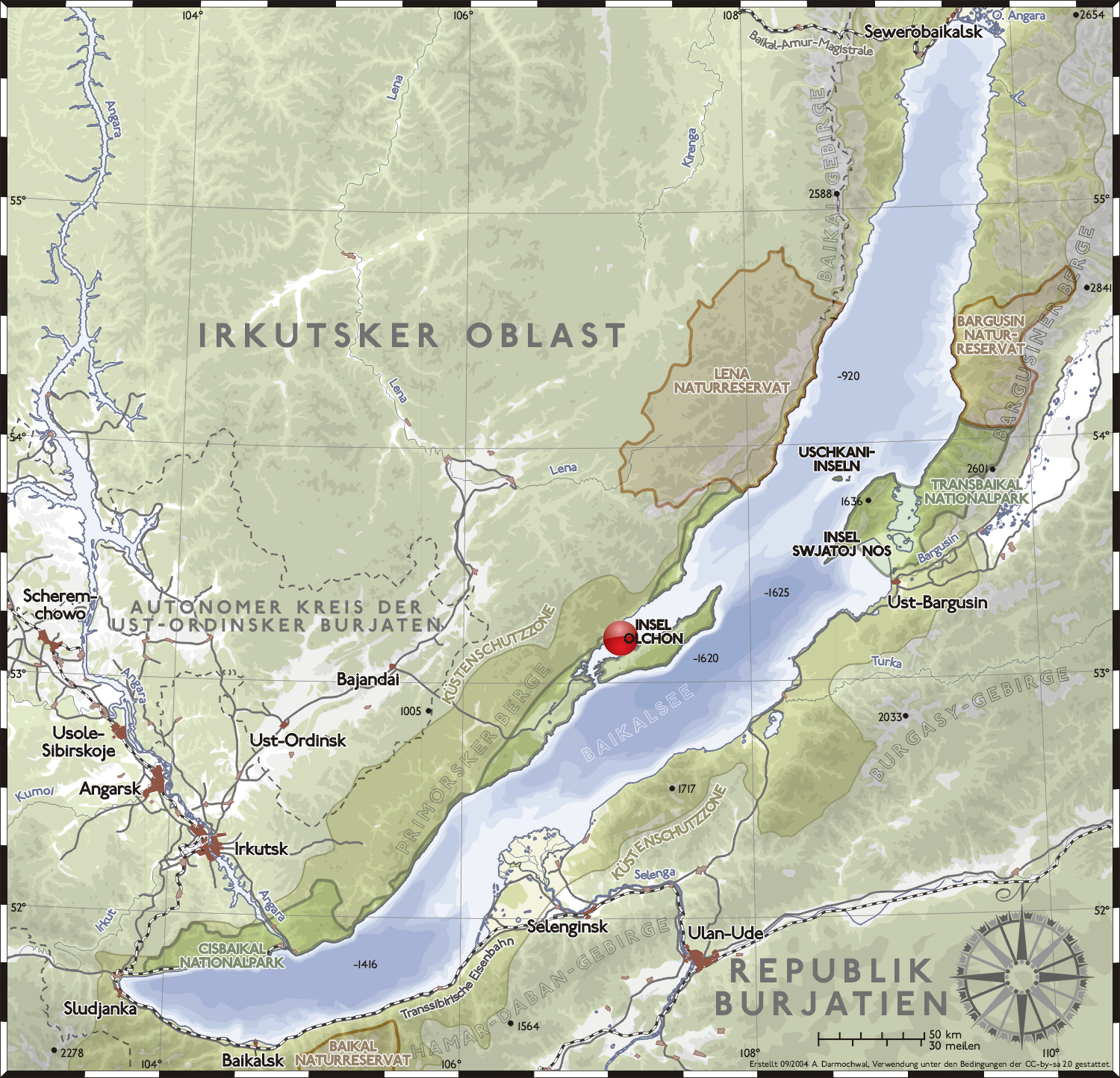

Geography
- Location: Lake Baikal
- Length: 2.9 km (1.8 mi)
- Width: 0.6 km (0.37 mi)
- Highest elevation: 512 m (1680 ft)

Administration
- Russia
- district: Siberia
- subject: Irkutsk Oblast

Ogoy (Russian: Ого́й from Buryat: Уһагγй - waterless) is the largest island in the Maloe More strait of Lake Baikal. It has an elongated shape, 2.9 km (1.8 mi) in length and 0.6 km (0.37 mi) in width. It is located between the Cape Shara-Shulun on the west coast of the Olkhon Island and Kurminskiy Bay on the western shore of Lake Baikal. The island is uninhabited.

== Wildlife and vegetation ==
Vegetation on the island is scarce, mainly grasses and low-growing shrubs, with a few larches in the wide central region. Wildlife includes ground squirrels, pikas, and snakes. The island is also a nesting ground for larks and herring gulls.

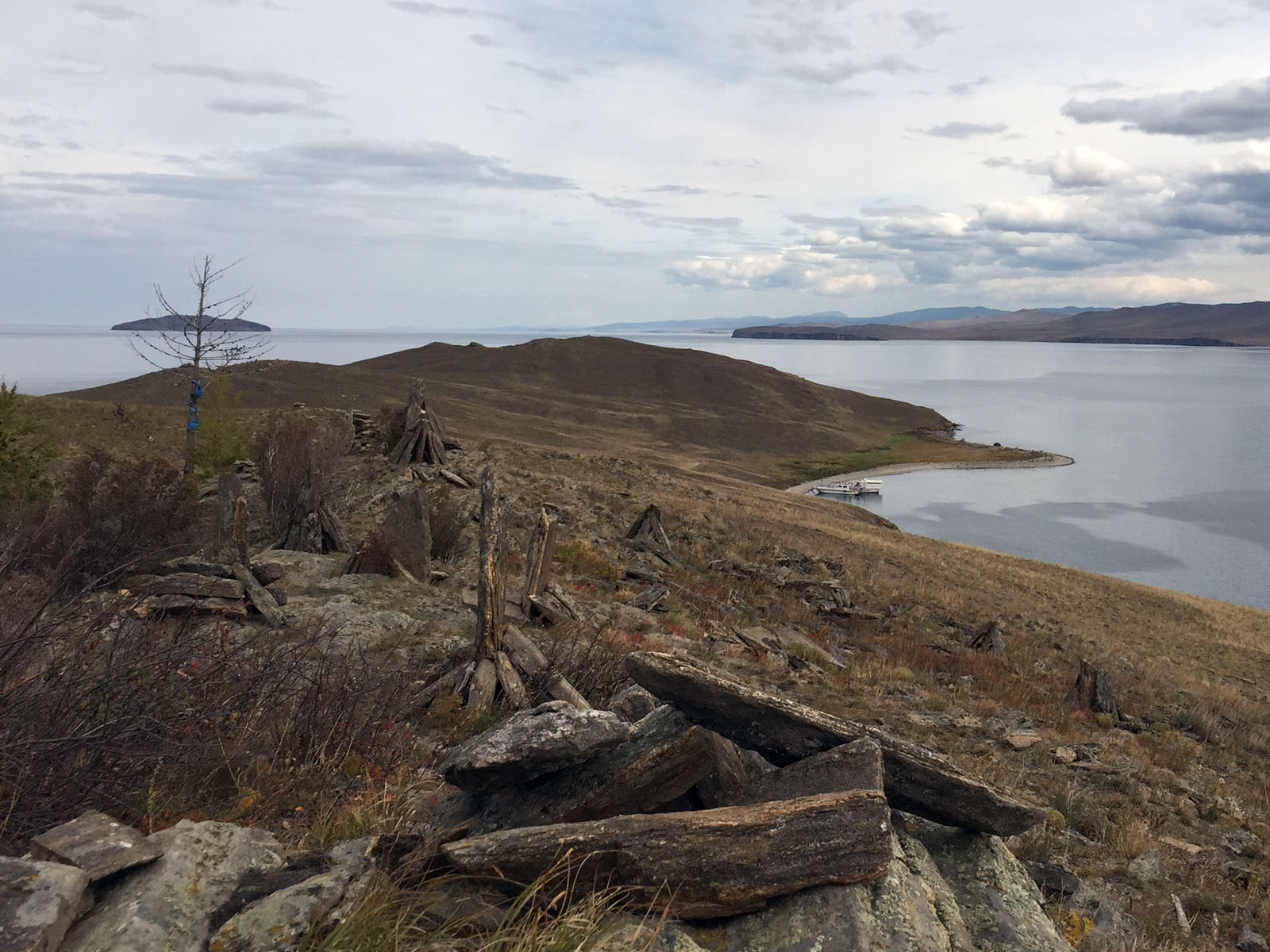
Northern part of Ogoy

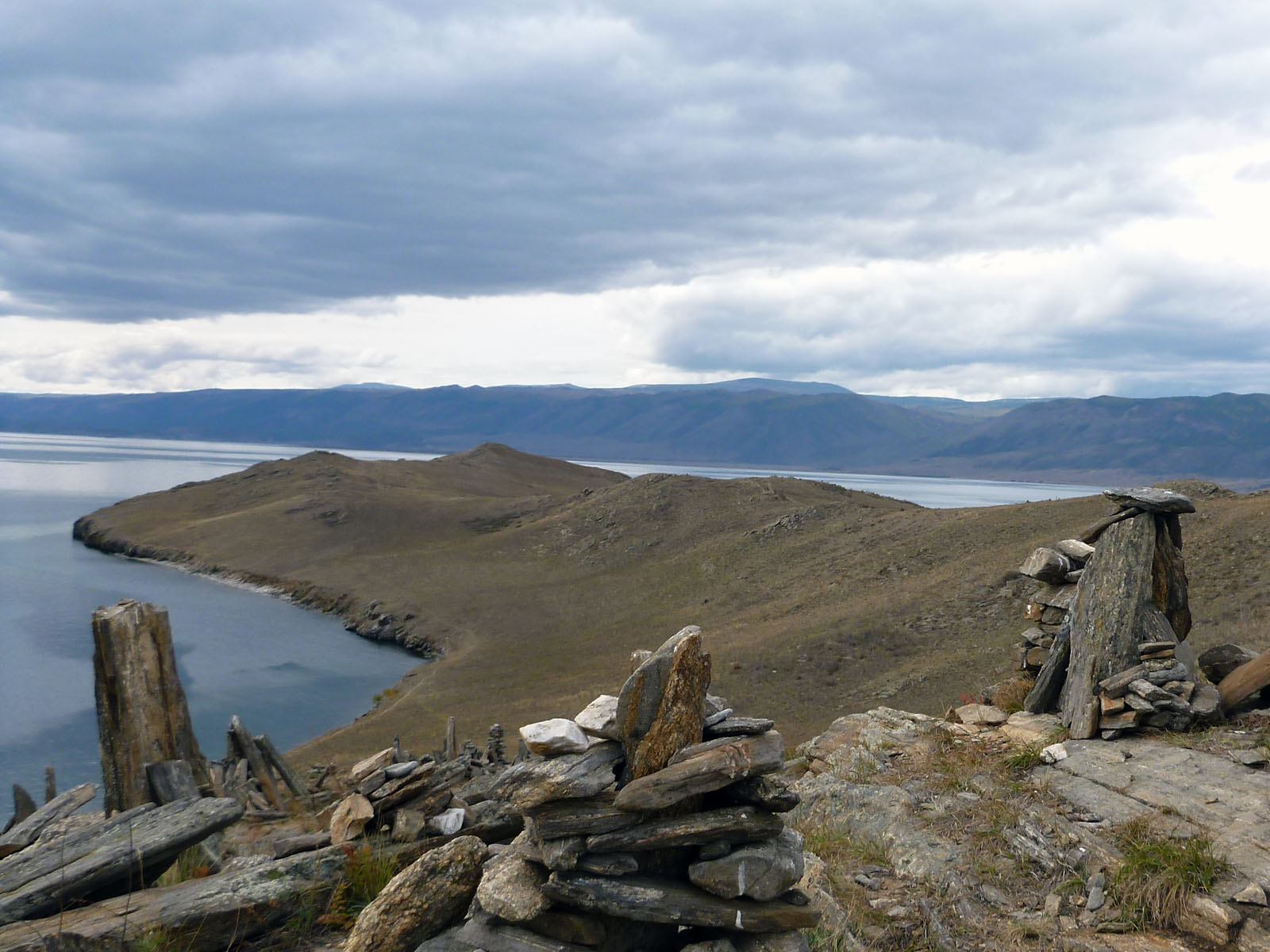
Southern part of Ogoy

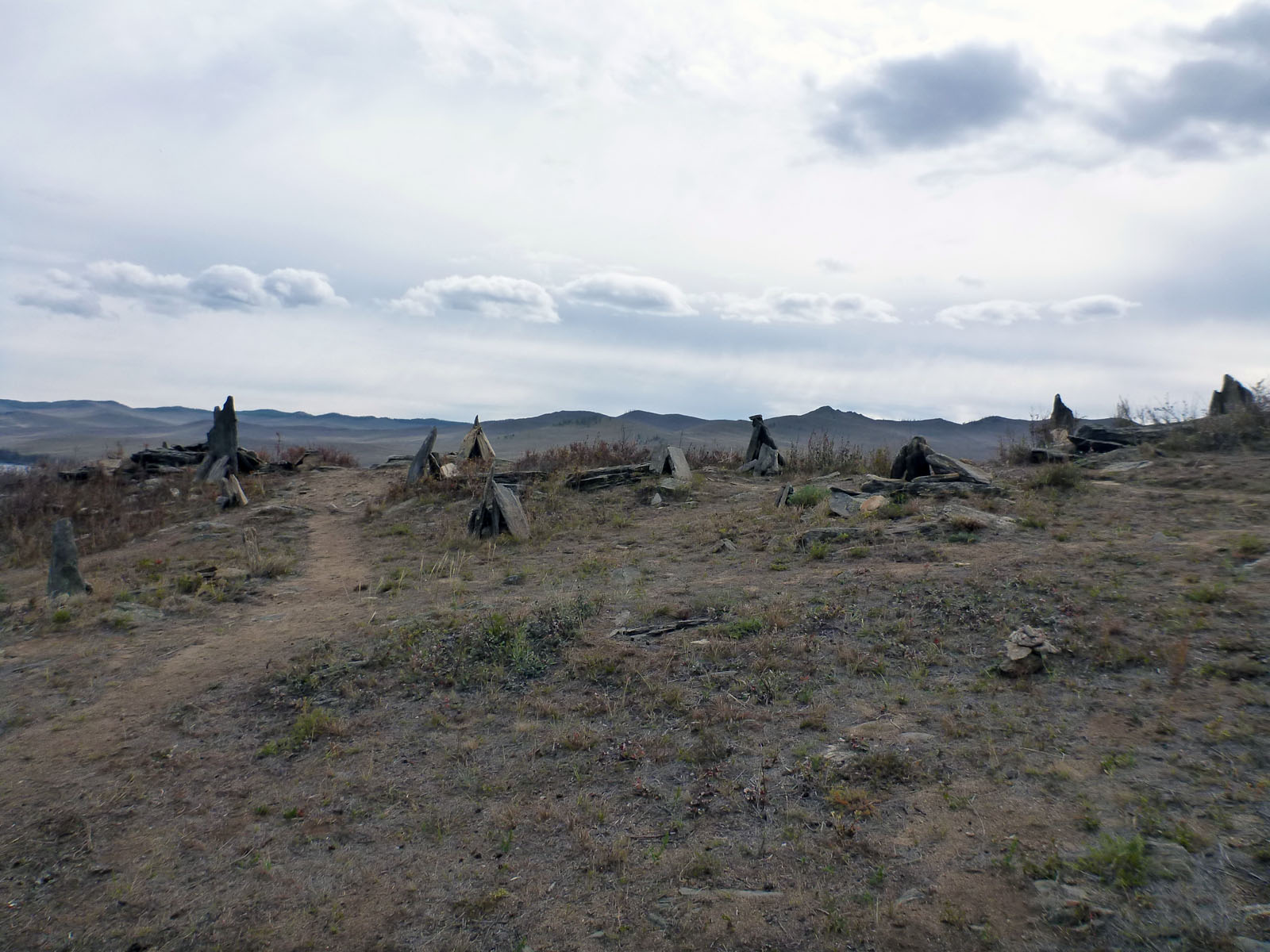
The landscape of Ogoy

== Places of interest ==
In 2005, at the highest point of the island, the Buddhist Stupa of Enlightenment dedicated to Dakini Tröma Nagmo was built at the initiative of the Moscow Buddhist Center. This significantly increased the flow of tourists to the island. In summer, excursions on the boats are organized and in winter, via automobile transport by ice.

According to representatives of the Siberian Institute of Physiology and Biochemistry of Plants, the increase of tourist flow can be detrimental to flora and fauna of the island.

== Pictures ==
Buddhist Stupa at Ogoy

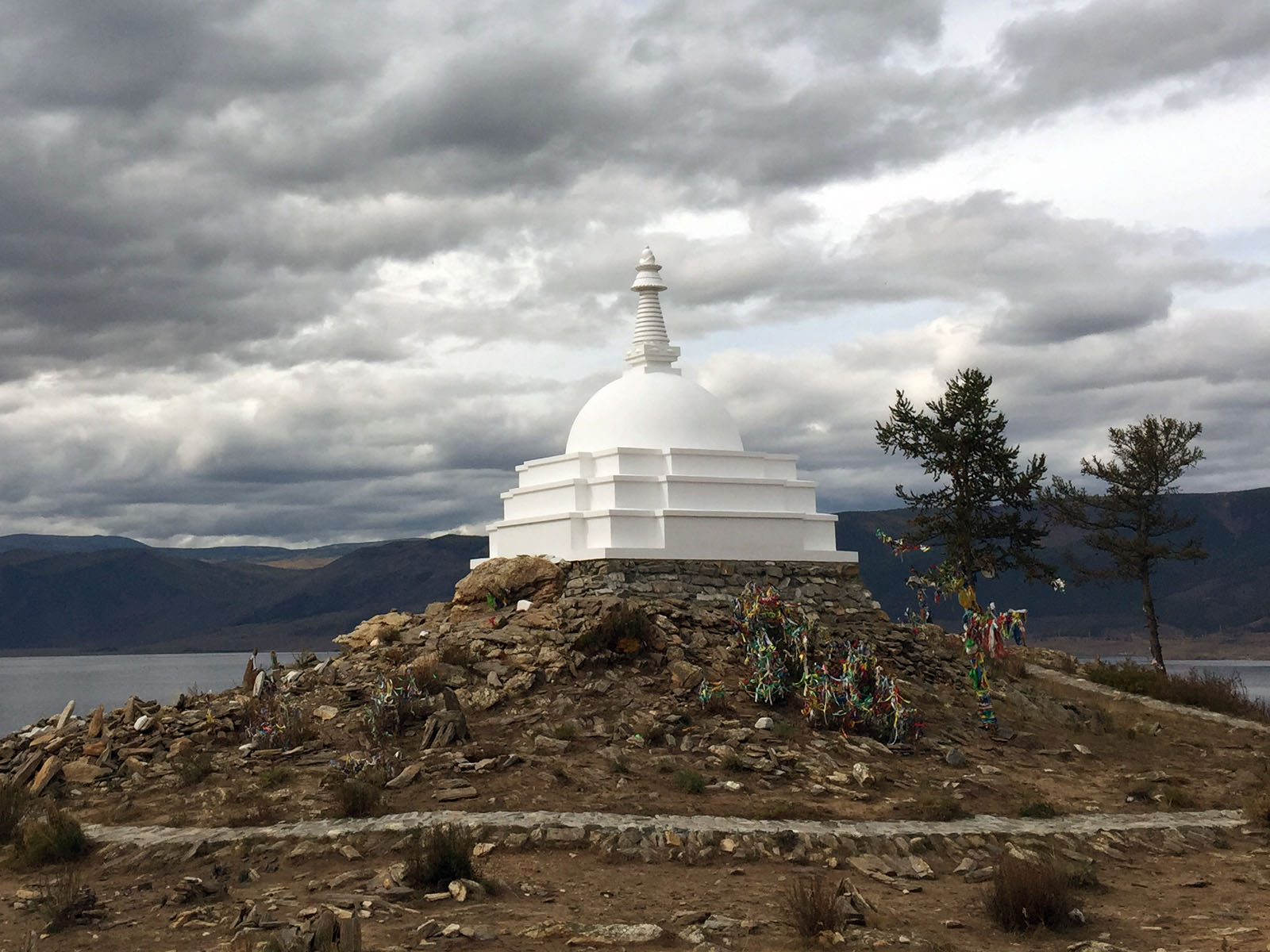

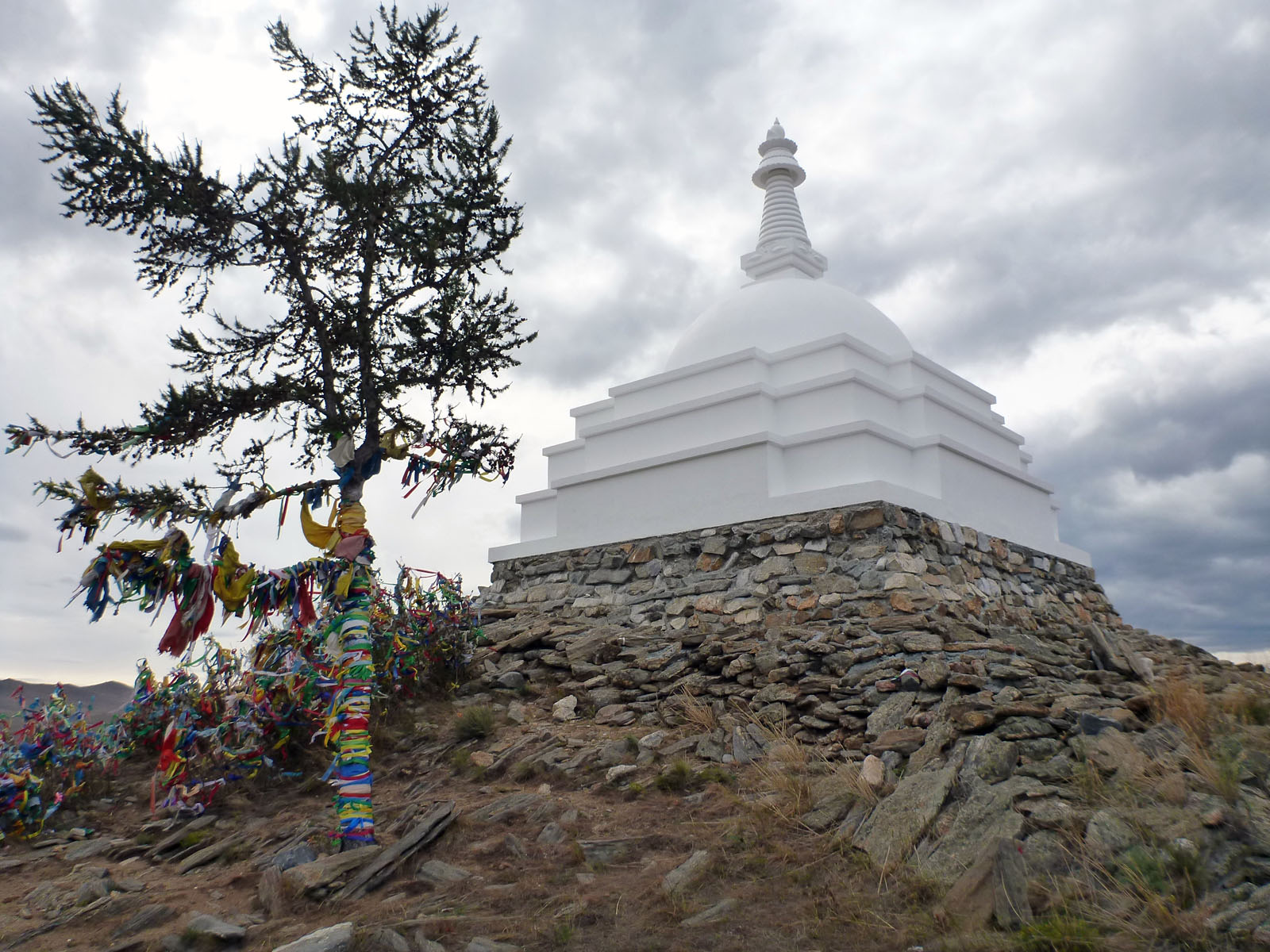

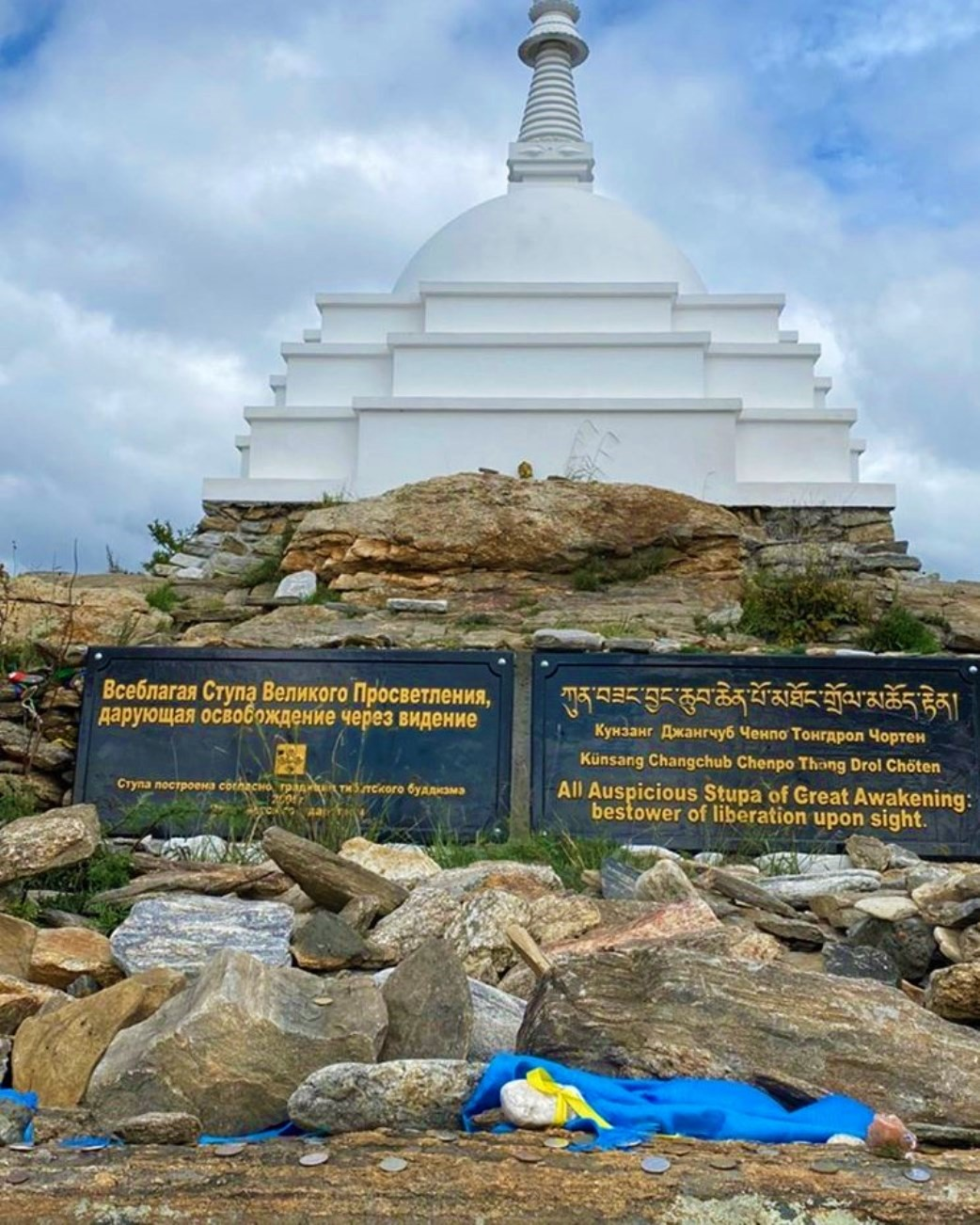

== See also ==
- List of lakes of Russia
