= Sarmīte =

- Gender: Female
- Name day: December 9

Origin
- Meaning: A diminutive form of Sarma, "hoarfrost"
- Region of origin: Latvia

Other names
- Related names: Sarma

Sarmīte is a Latvian feminine given name. The associated name day is December 9.

== Notable people named Sarmīte ==
- Sarmīte Ēlerte (born 1957), Latvian politician
- Sarmīte Ķikuste (born 1962), Latvian politician
- Sarmīte Stone (born 1963), Latvian rower
