= Baikal-Lena Nature Reserve =

Nature reserve in Irkutsk Oblast, Russia

- Russian: Байкало-Ленский заповедник (Also: Lake Baikal; Baikal-Lensky; Baikal-Lena)
- IUCN category Ia (strict nature reserve)
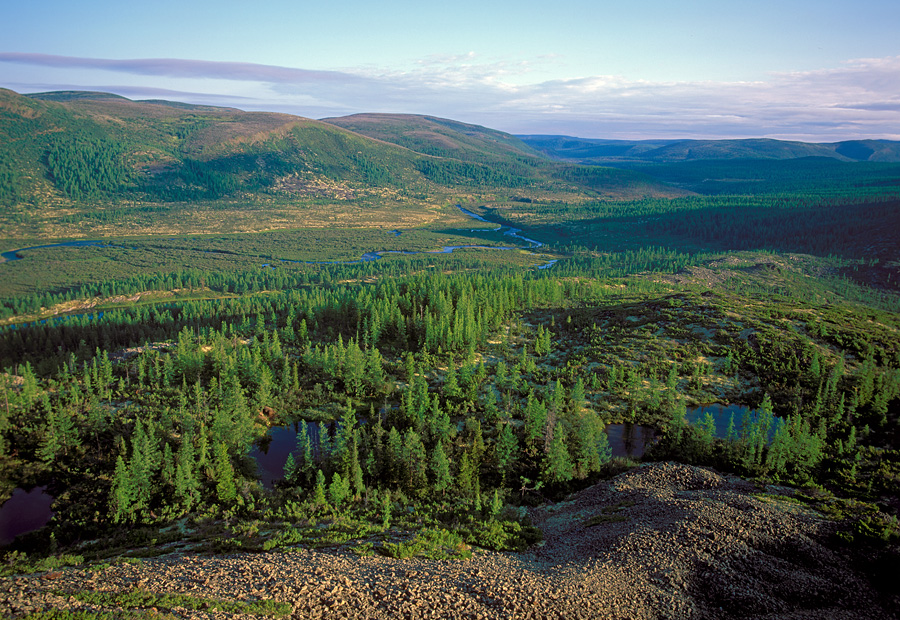
- Baykal-Lena Zapovednik

- Location within Russia
- Location: Irkutsk Oblast
- Nearest city: Irkutsk
- Coordinates: 55°13′0″N 107°45′0″E
- Area: 660,000 hectares (1,630,896 acres; 2,548 sq mi)
- Established: 1986
- Governing body: Ministry of Natural Resources and Environment (Russia)
- Website: http://www.baikal-1.ru/

Baikal-Lena Nature Reserve (Russian: Байкало-Ленский заповедник) (also Lake Baikal; or Baykal-Lensky, or Baykal-Lena) is a Russian 'zapovednik' (strict nature reserve) located on the northwest coast of Lake Baikal in southern Siberia. It protects both lake shore and the source of the Lena River. The reserve stretches along the western coast of Lake Baikal for about 120 km, with an average width of 65 km. The reserve is situated in the Kachugsky District of Irkutsk Oblast. As of December 1996, the Baikal-Lena Reserve (combined with the Barguzin and Baikal Reserves) is included in the list of sites of World Cultural and Natural Heritage, and a World Heritage Site with Pribaikalsky National Park. The Baikal-Lena Reserve is managed jointly with Pribaikalsky National Park, which is immediately to the south, thus protecting a continuous 580 km of shoreline on Lake Baikal.

== Topography ==
The Baikal-Lena Reserve has three sectors: the coast ("The shore of brown bears"), the Upper Lena River, and the Kirengsky sector. Because of its position on the lake shore with a mountain ridge to the west to screen the prevailing winds, Baikal-Lena is the driest reserve on the lake. The Lena River originates in the reserve, running for 250 km within the borders. Rivers on the east slope of the Baikal Mountains are short and shallow, and at times their flow is insufficient to reach the lake and the water drains into the ground.

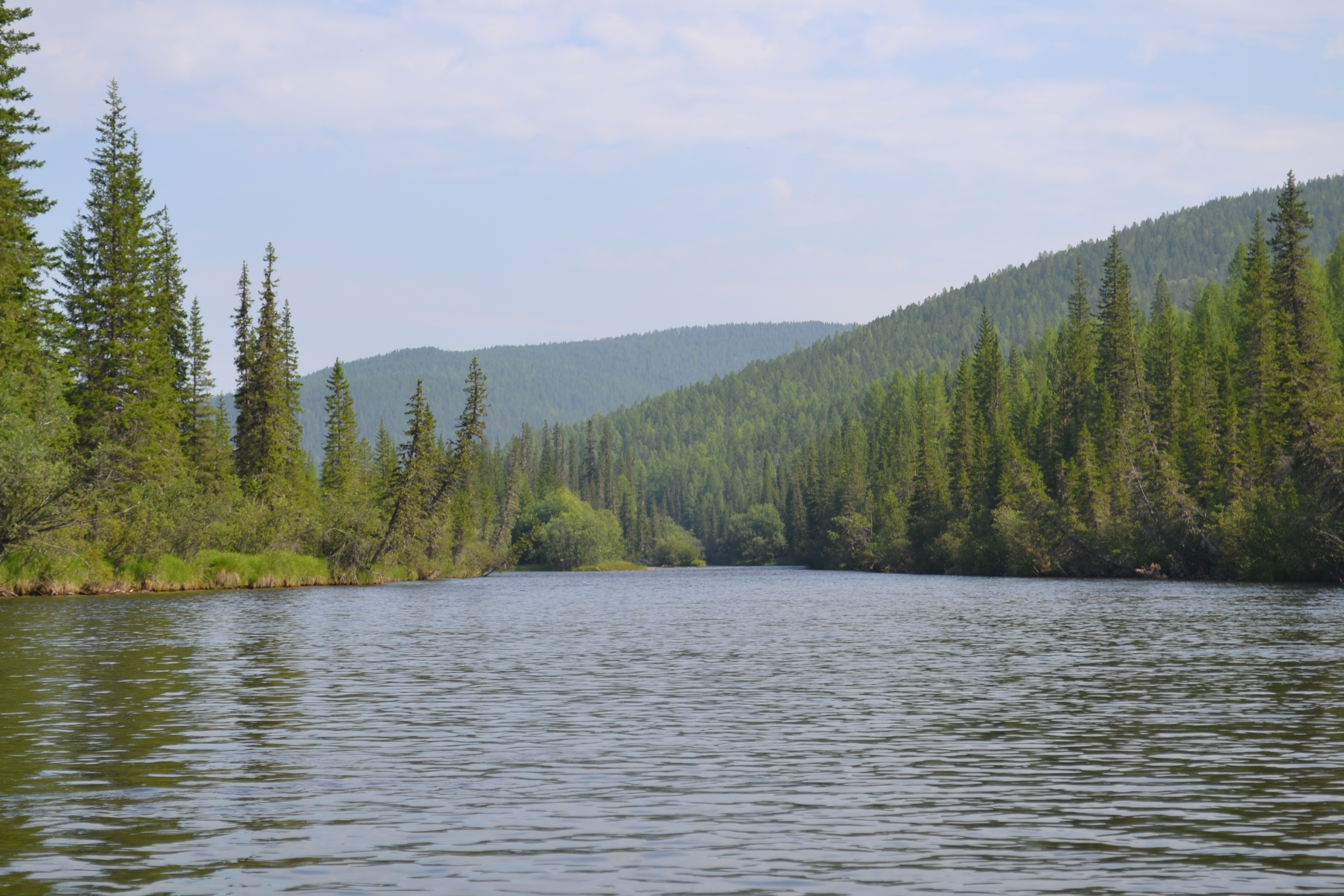
Lena River in Baikal-Lena Zapovednik

== Climate and ecoregion ==
Baikal-Lena Reserve is located in the East Siberian taiga ecoregion. Between the Yenisei River and Lena River. Its northern border reaches the Arctic Circle, and its southern border reaches 52°N latitude. The dominant vegetation is light coniferous taiga with larch (Larix gmelinii forming the canopy in areas with low snow cover. This ecoregion is rich in minerals.

The climate of Baikal-Lena is Subarctic climate, without dry season (Köppen climate classification Subarctic climate (Dfc)). This climate is characterized by mild summers (only 1–3 months above 10 °C (50.0 °F)) and cold, snowy winters (coldest month below −3 °C (26.6 °F)). During the warmest month in Baikal-Lena, August, the average temperature is +14 °C; in January the average is −18 °C. Precipitation ranges from 250 mm per year on the coast to 1,000 mm on the mountain tops. Fogs are frequent in the first half of summer.

== Flora and fauna ==
86% of the Reserve is forested, with taiga characteristics. The territory has 6 species of conifers (including Siberian larch, pine, Siberian pine, Siberian fir, spruce) and 5 species of hardwood (including white birch, willow, aspen, and poplar). There are swamps and marshes on the lowland river floodplains. There are 58 species of mammals in the reserve. The common predators are the sable, ermine, weasel, otter, and the wolverine.

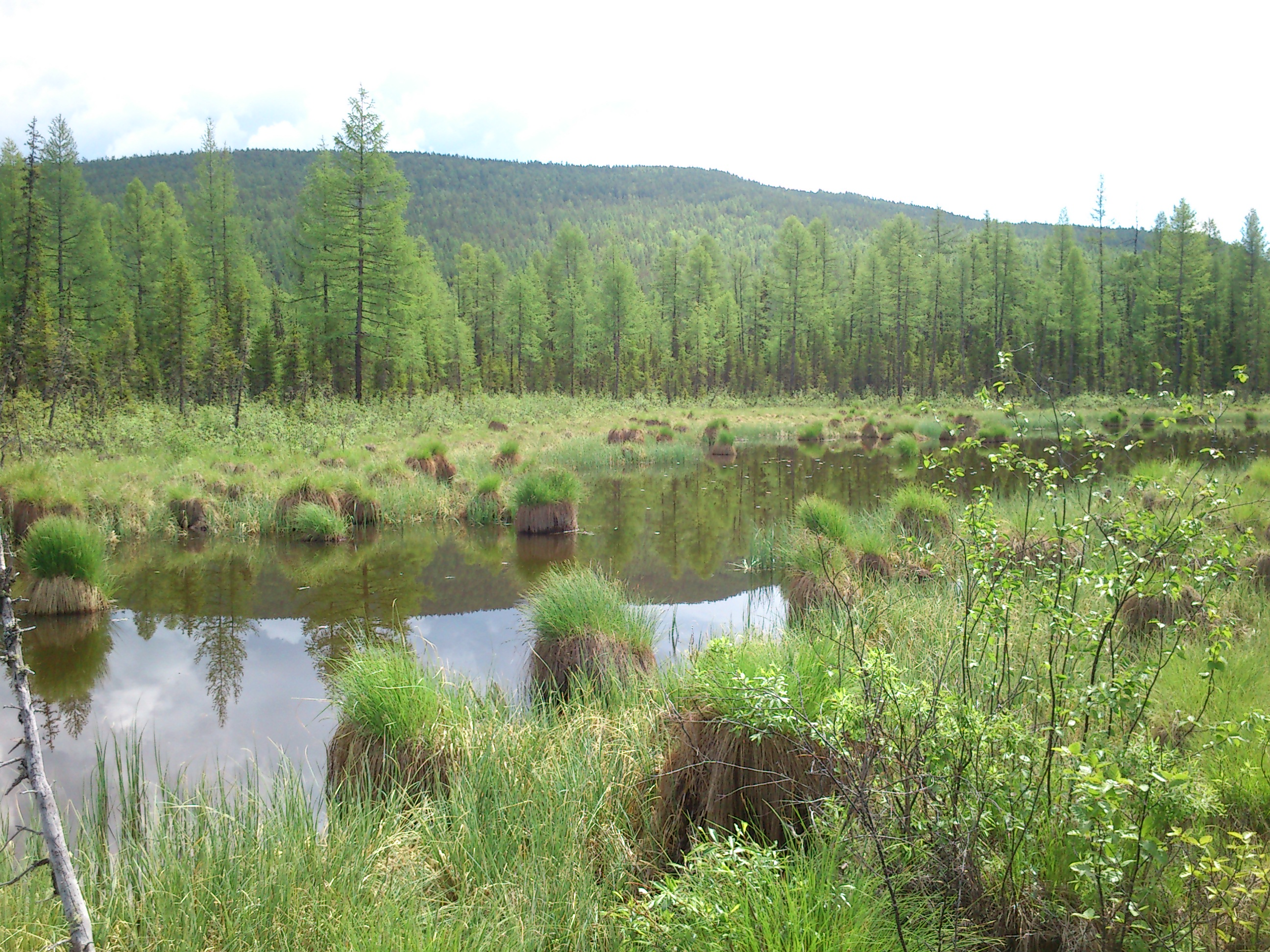
Swamp in Baikal-Lena

== Ecotourism ==
As a strict nature reserve, the Baikal-Lena Reserve is mostly closed to the general public, although scientists and those with 'environmental education' purposes can make arrangements with park management for visits. There are three 'ecotourist' routes in the reserve, however, that are open to the public, but written permits must be obtained in advance at the reserves main offices in Irkutsk. The boundaries of the reserve do not extend over the waters of the lake, so it is possible to undertake water tours along the coast. The reserve also permits group rafting trips on the Lena River upon written application and approval.

== See also ==
- List of Russian Nature Reserves (class 1a 'zapovedniks')
- National parks of Russia
- Protected areas of Russia
