= Tryokhgolovy Golets =

Peak in Primorsky Range, Irkutsk, Russia

- Трёхголовый Голец
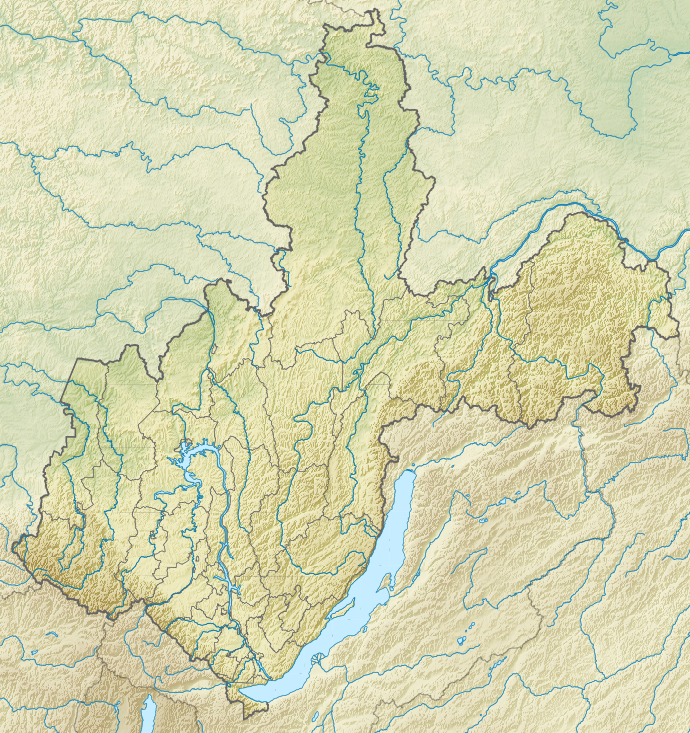
- Location within Irkutsk Oblast

Highest point
- Elevation: 1,746 m (5,728 ft)
- Prominence: 748
- Coordinates: 53°51′54″N 107°52′29″E

Geography
- Location: Irkutsk Oblast, Russia
- Parent range: Primorsky Range

Climbing
- Easiest route: from Bayanday

Tryokhgolovy Golets (Russian: Трёхголовый Голец) is the highest peak in the Primorsky Range, Irkutsk Oblast, Russia.

== Geography ==
Tryokhgolovy Golets, meaning "Three-headed Golets" is a 1,746 m (5,728 ft) high ‘’golets’’ type of mountain with a bald summit. Some sources give a height of 1,730 m (5,680 ft).

The peak is located in near Lake Baikal, to the west of the western shore of the lake. It rises above Maloye Morye, opposite Olkhon Island

== See also ==
- List of mountains and hills of Russia
