= Listvyanka, Irkutsky District, Irkutsk Oblast =

Listvyanka Листвя́нка
- Urban-type settlement
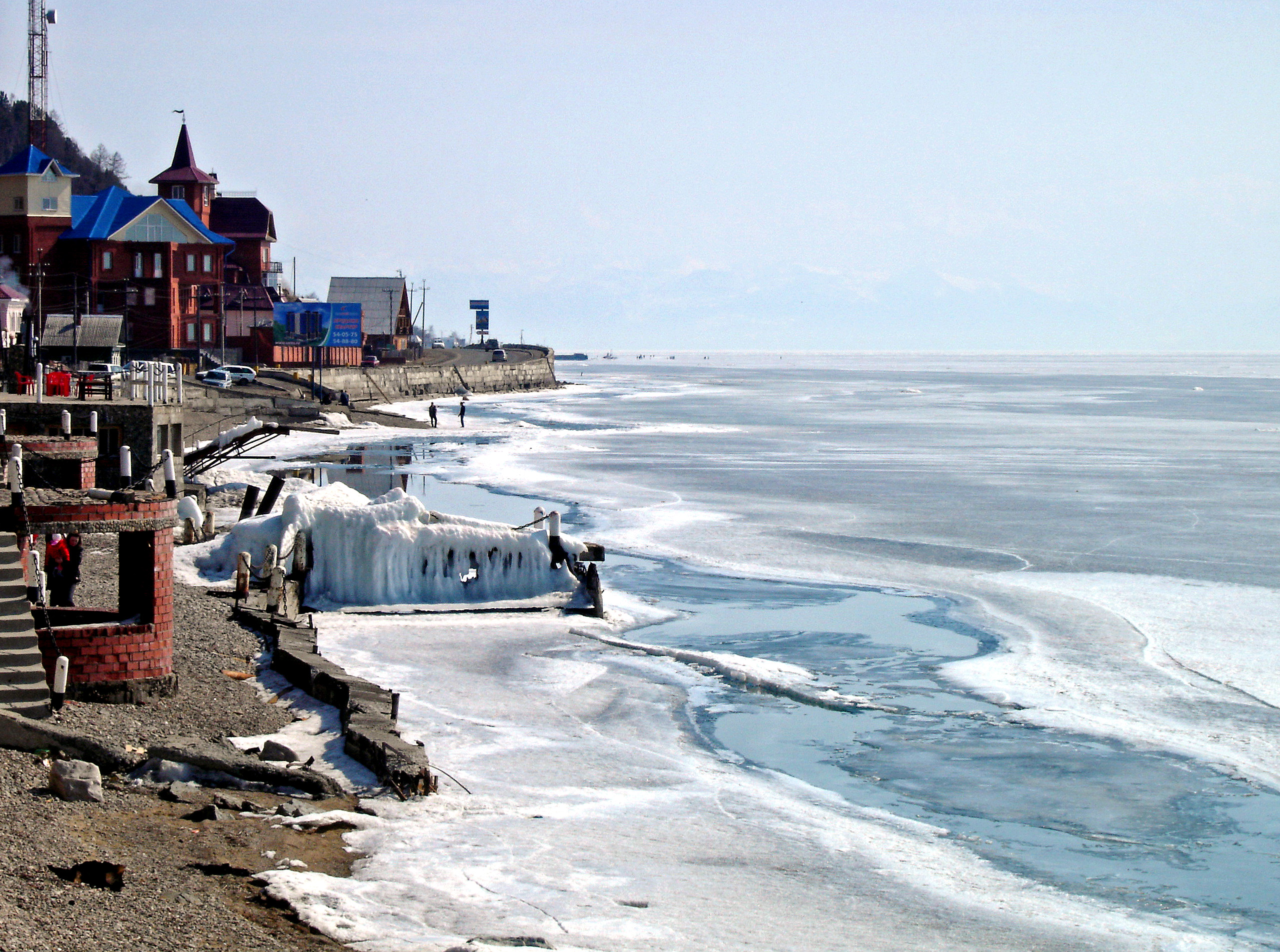
- Listvyanka shore in early April

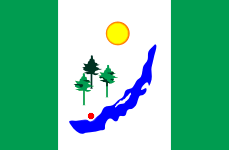
- Flag
- Interactive map of Listvyanka
- Location of Listvyanka Listvyanka (Irkutsk Oblast)
- Coordinates: 51°51′N 104°52′E
- Country: Russia
- Federal subject: Irkutsk Oblast
- Administrative district: Irkutsky District
- Founded: 18th century
- Elevation: 470 m (1,540 ft)

Population (2010 Census)
  - Total: 1,882
  - Estimate (2025): 1,826 (−3%)
- Time zone: UTC+8 (MSK+5)
- Postal codes: 664521, 664520
- OKTMO ID: 25612160051

Listvyanka (Russian: Листвя́нка) is an urban locality (a work settlement) in Irkutsky District of Irkutsk Oblast, Russia, located 70 kilometers (43 mi) from Irkutsk, near the Primorsky Range and the point where the Angara River leaves Lake Baikal. Population: 1,882 (2010 census); 1,745 (2002 census); 2,379 (1989 Soviet census). According to the report of the Head of the Listvyanka Municipal District dated February 21, 2025, there are 2156 citizens registered in Listvyanka:

Citizens of working age – 1,222 (in 2023 – 1,053); Citizens older than working age – 666 (in 2023 – 745); Working pensioners (older than working age) – 109 (in 2023 – 120); Children aged 0–18 – 277 (in 2022 – 358). Students aged 7 to 18 – 198.

== Transportation ==
Listvyanka is accessible by bus or ferry from Irkutsk.

== Climate ==
Summer temperatures in Listvyanka range within highs of 77 °F (25 °C) and lows of 54 °F (12 °C). Normally in the winter temperatures drop down below 12 °F (−11 °C).

== Gallery ==
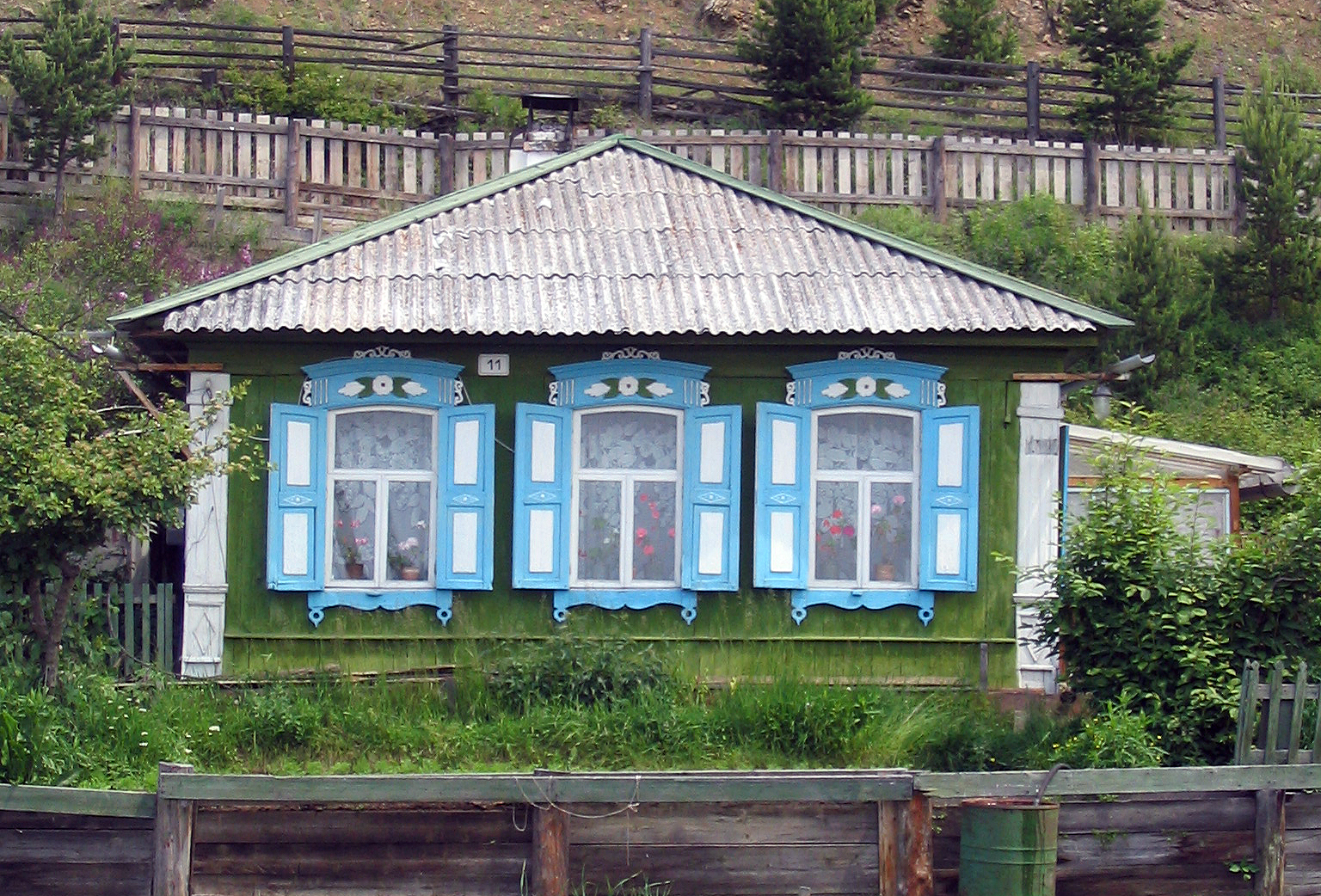
A wooden house in Listvyanka

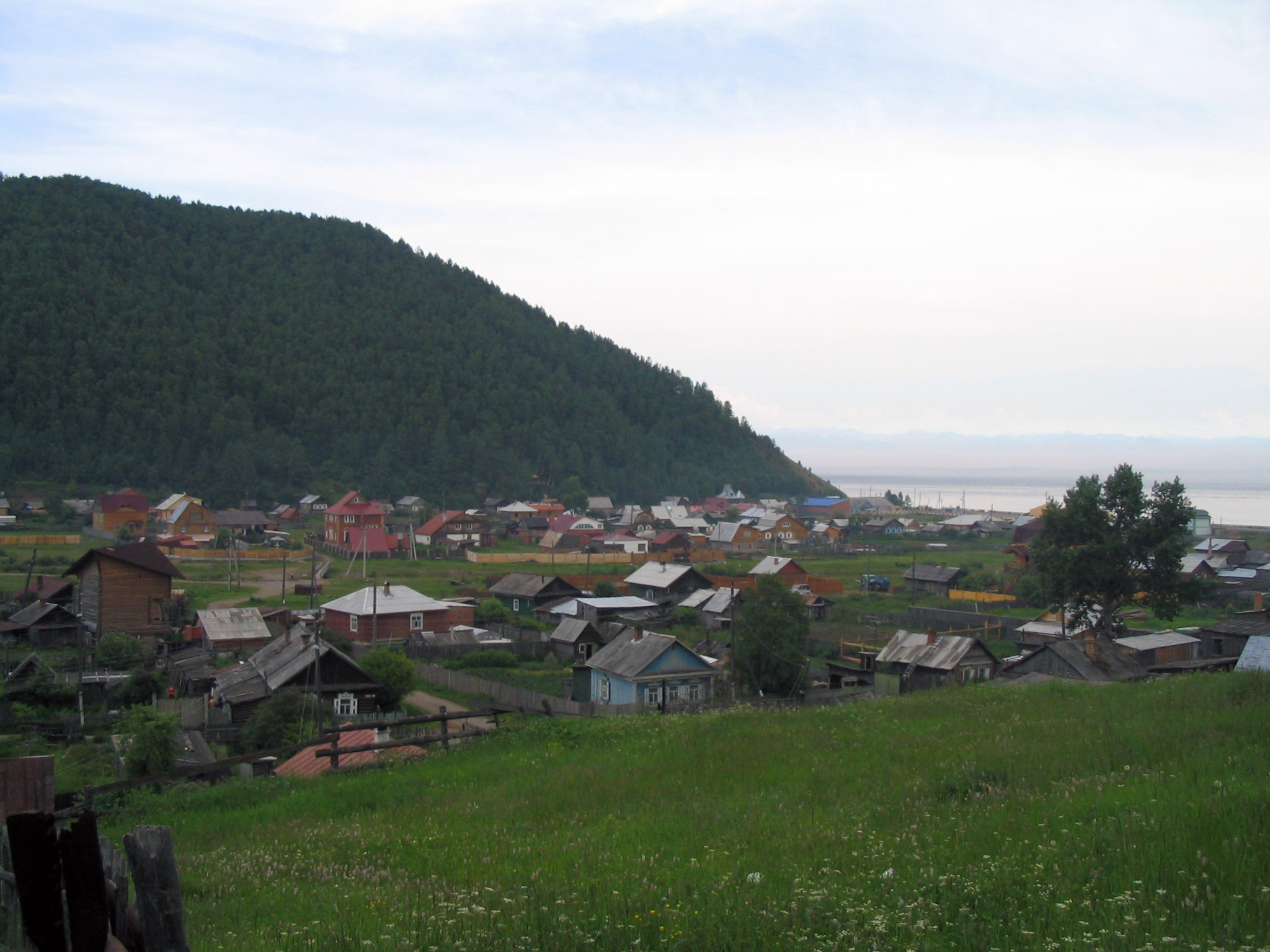
Krestovka Valley near Listvyanka

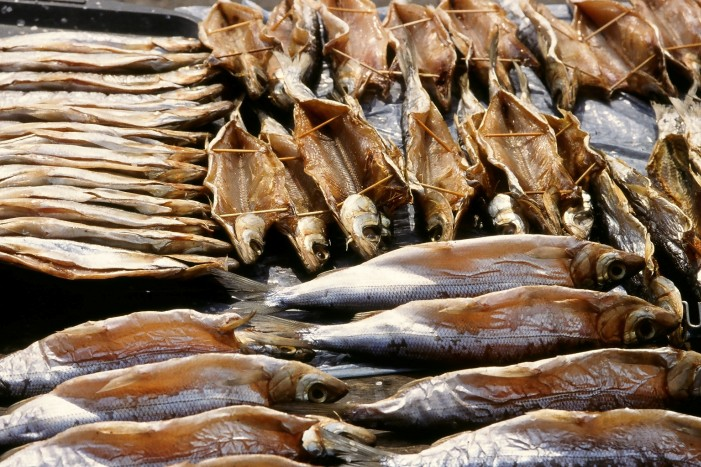
Omul fish at the Listvyanka market

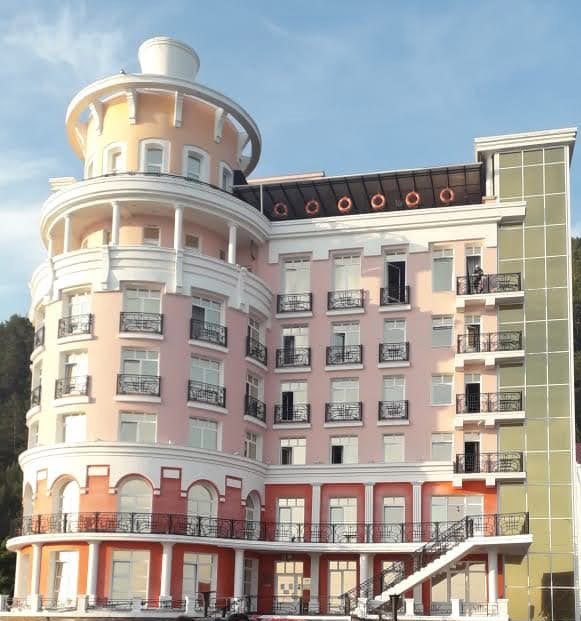
Mayak Hotel in Listvyanka, Irkutsk region

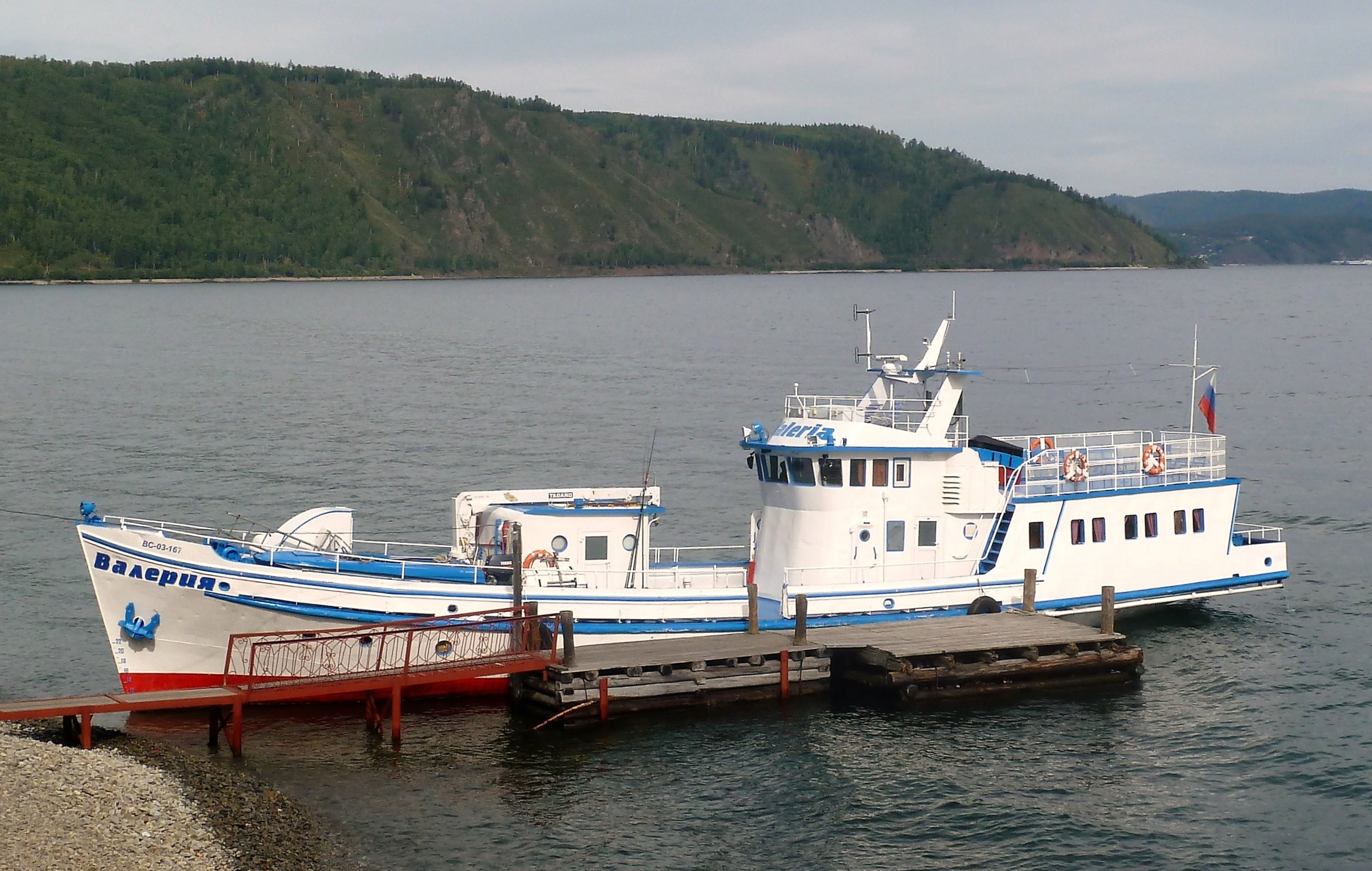
Ferry Valeriya (ship, 1971)
