= Primorsky Range =

Mountain range in Russia

- Приморский хребет
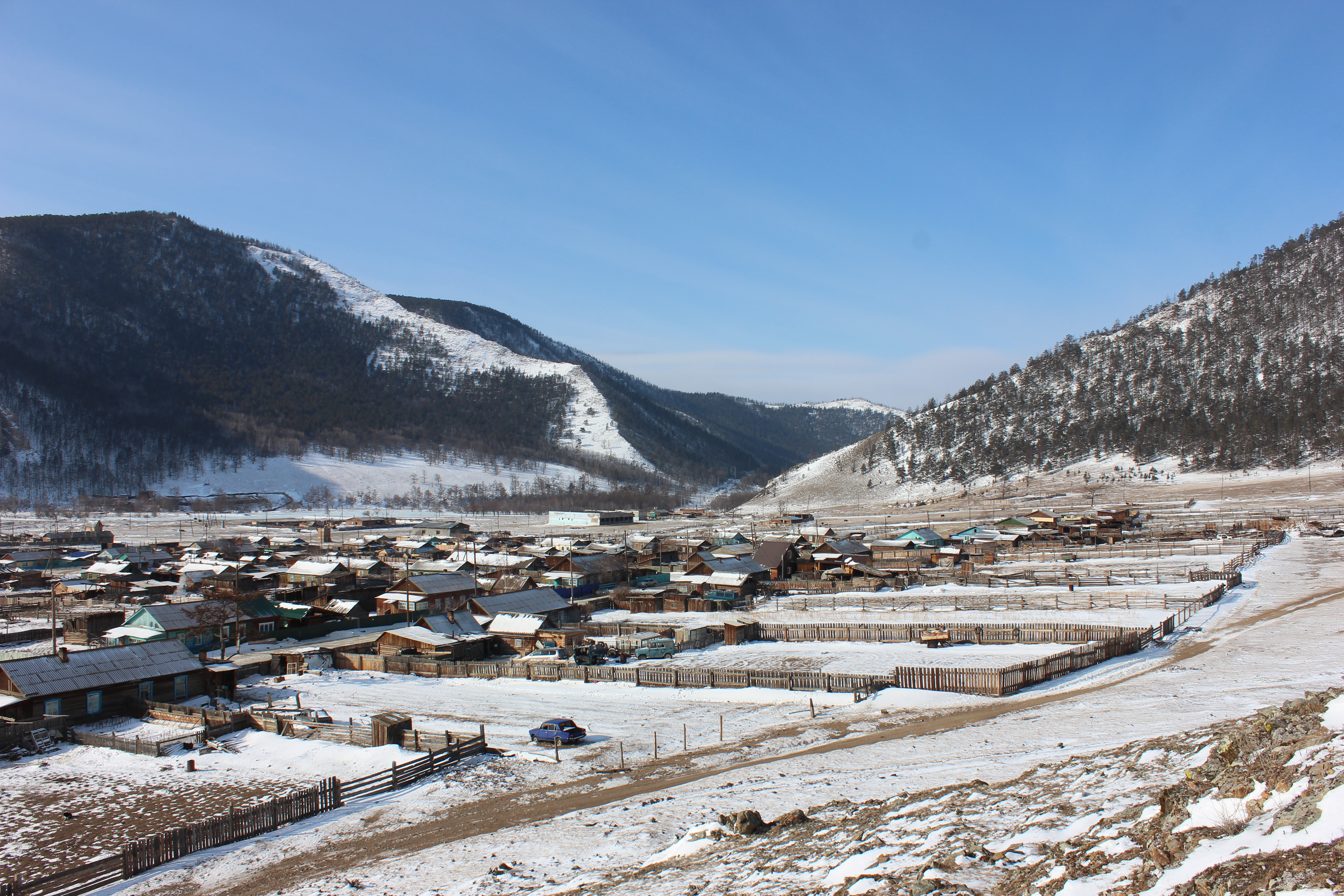
- View of the range rising above Buguldeyka

Highest point
- Peak: Tryokhgolovy Golets
- Elevation: 1,746 m (5,728 ft)
- Coordinates: 53°51′54″N 107°52′29″E

Dimensions
- Length: 350 km (220 mi) NE/ SW
- Width: 50 km (31 mi) NW / SE

Geography
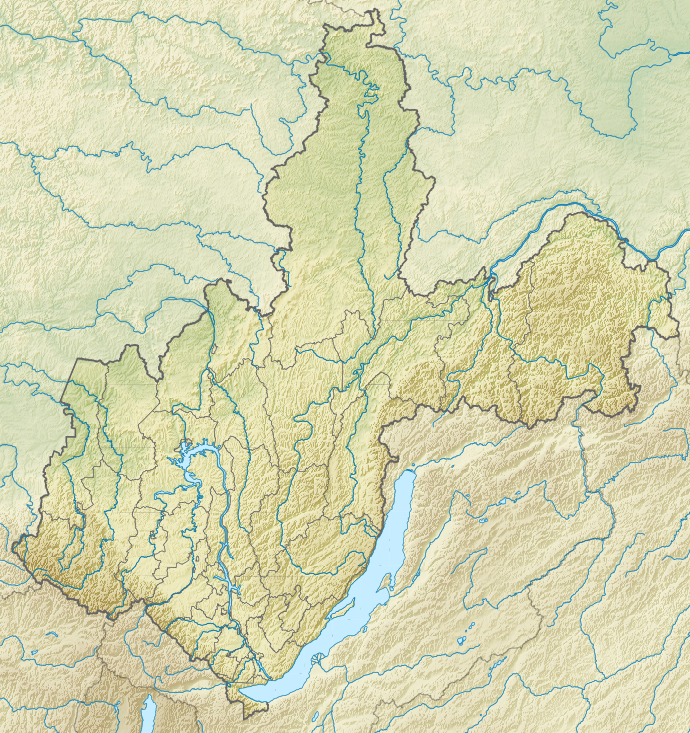
- Location within Irkutsk Oblast
- Location: Irkutsk Oblast, Russian Federation
- Range coordinates: 52°50′N 106°10′E
- Parent range: South Siberian System

Geology
- Orogeny: Alpine orogeny
- Rock age: Proterozoic
- Rock type(s): Gneiss, sandstone, limestone, granite

Climbing
- Easiest route: From Listvyanka

The Primorsky Range (Russian: Приморский хребет) is a range of mountains in Southern Siberia, part of the South Siberian Mountains. Administratively the range belongs to the Irkutsk Oblast, Russian Federation. The settlement of Buguldeyka, Olkhonsky District, is located in the range area.

== Geography ==
The Primorsky Range stretches northeastwards for about 350 kilometres (220 mi) along the western shore of Lake Baikal from its southern end. It is located in the area of the sources of the Lena and to the north it connects with the Baikal Range, which also stretches along the lakeshore. Its eastern side is made mostly of rocky cliffs descending steeply to the shores of Lake Baikal, opposite Olkhon Island. The western slopes of the range are more gentle and are facing the Lena-Angara Plateau. The range includes highly developed karst forms.

The highest point of the Primorsky Range is Tryokhgolovy Golets, a 1,746 metres (5,728 ft) high ‘’golets’’-type of mountain with a bald peak, located in the northern section. Other high peaks are 1,658 metres (5,440 ft) high Sarminsky Golets, 1,657 metres (5,436 ft) high Khargitui Golets and 1,336 metres (4,383 ft) high Moryany Golets.

=== Hydrography ===
The Primorsky Range acts as a watershed between the rivers of the Lake Baikal and the Angara/Lena basins. Short and fast-flowing rivers have their sources in the range, including the Anga, Bolshaya Buguldeyka, Sarma and Goloustnaya, which flow into Lake Baikal. Also several left tributaries of the Lena, such as the Ilikta and Manzurka, as well as several small right tributaries of the Angara flow from the range.

== Flora ==
The gentler slopes of the range are mainly covered with pine and larch forests and the northern half of the eastern slopes with steppe vegetation. There are bare summits (golets) in the higher elevations.

== See also ==
- List of mountains and hills of Russia
- Pribaikalsky National Park
