= Sarma (given name) =

- Gender: Female

Origin
- Meaning: Hoarfrost
- Region of origin: Latvia

Other names
- Related names: Sarmīte

Sarma is a feminine Latvian given name. Its name day is December 5th.

Notable people with the name include:

- Sarma Melngailis (born 1972), Latvian-American restaurateur
- Sarma Sedleniece (1939–2020), Latvian chess master
