= Sarma (river) =

River in Russia

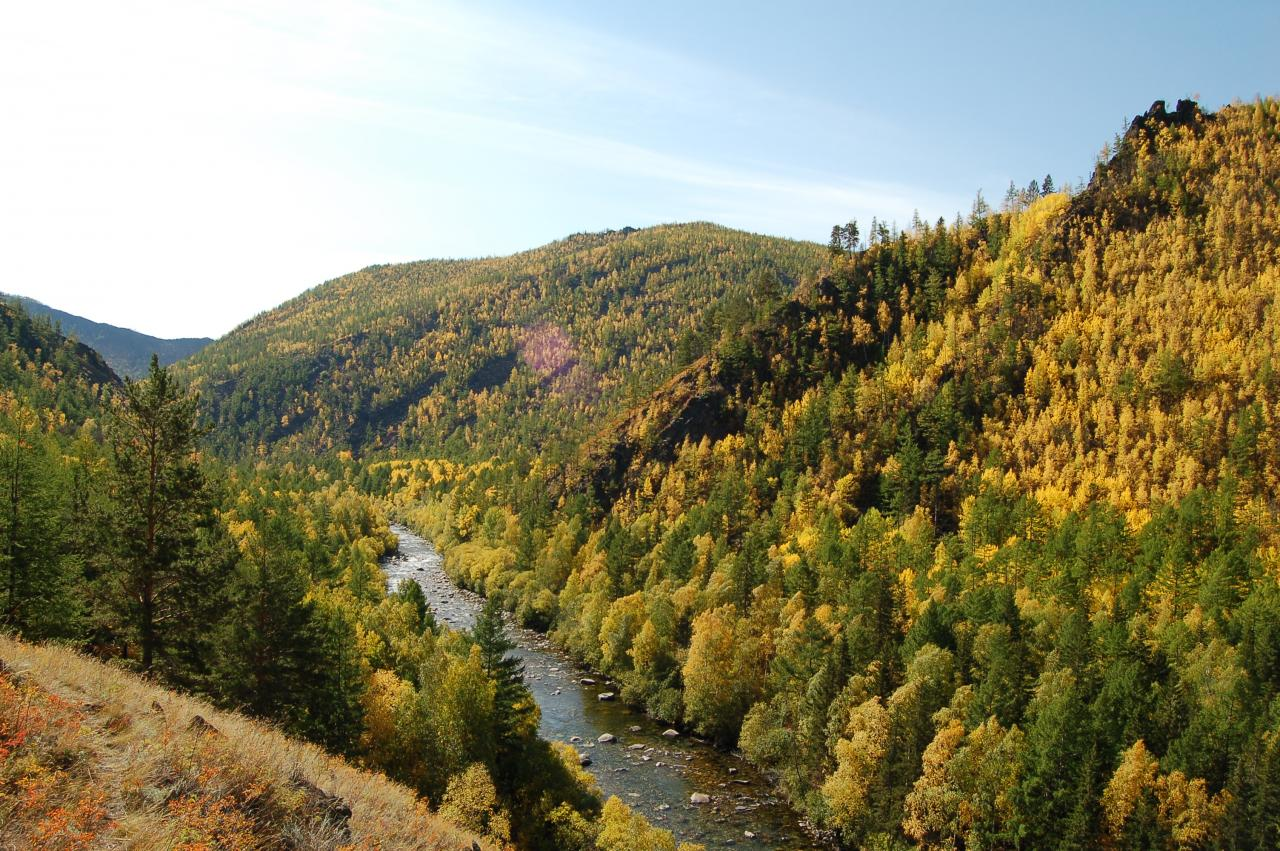

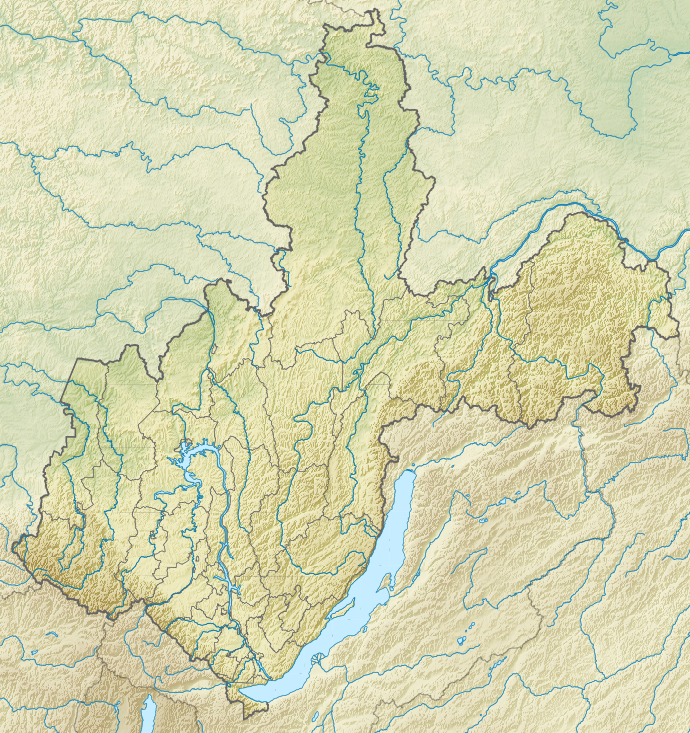
- Mouth location

Location
- Country: Russia

Physical characteristics
- Source: Primorsky Range
- Mouth: Lake Baikal
  - coordinates: 53°05′50″N 106°50′45″E
- Length: 66 km (41 mi)
- Basin size: 787 km^{2} (304 sq mi)

Basin features
- Progression: Lake Baikal→ Angara→ Yenisey→ Kara Sea

The Sarma (Russian: Сарма) is a river in Irkutsk Oblast, Russia. It runs from the Primorsky Range into the Small Sea Strait of Lake Baikal. It is 66 kilometres (41 mi) long, and has a drainage basin of 787 square kilometres (304 sq mi).

The valley and estuary of Sarma is the source of the strongest of Lake Baikal's winds, the Sarma wind. Its speed may exceed 40 metres per second (89 mph).

== See also ==
- List of rivers of Russia
