= Uzury =

Uzury Узуры
- Village
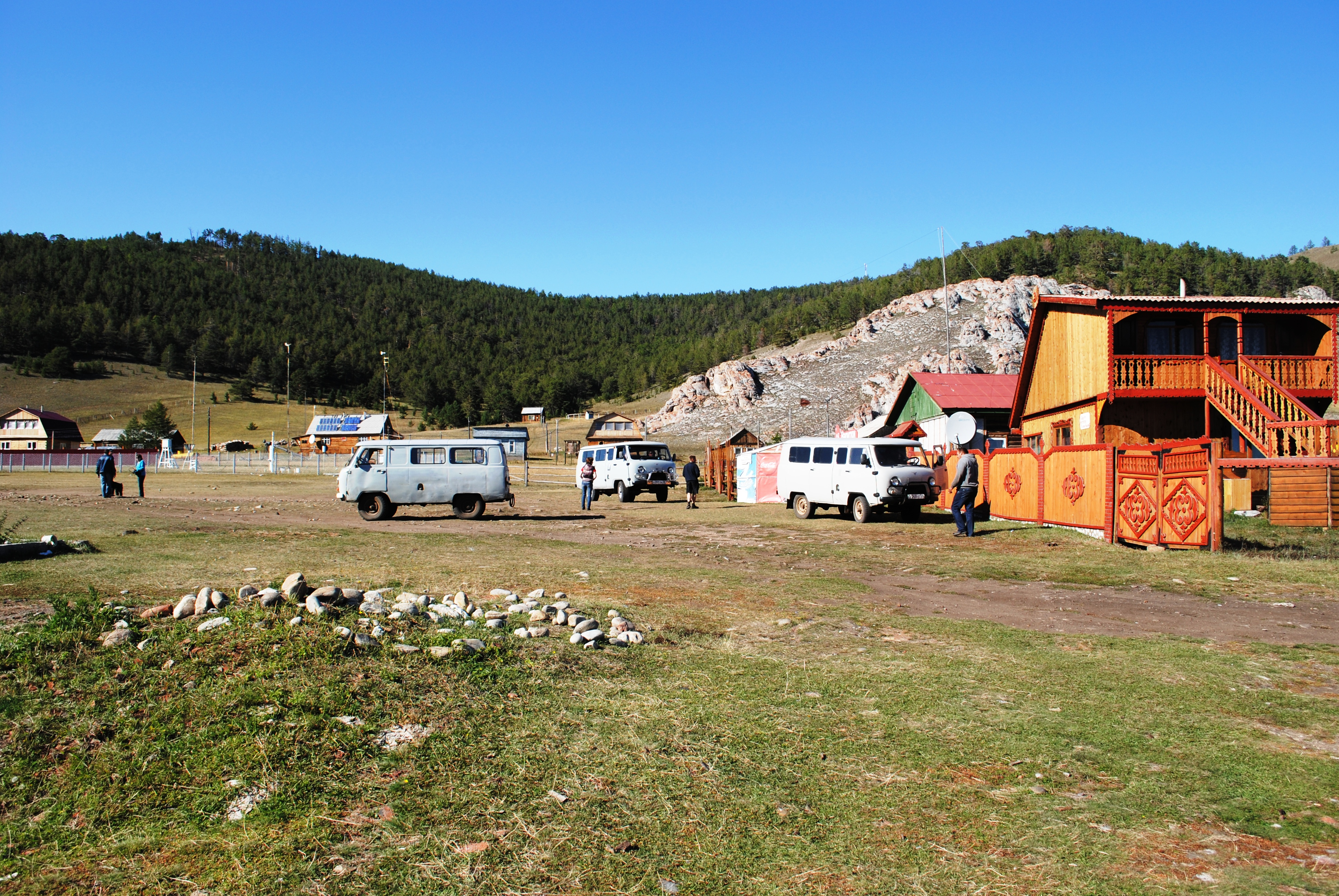
- The meteorological station in Uzury

- Location within Russia
- Coordinates: 53°19′24″N 107°44′27″E
- Country: Russia
- Federal subject: Irkutsk Region
- Administrative district: Olkhonsky District
- Municipal unit: Khuzhirskiy

Population (2010)
  - Total: 9
  - Ethnicities: Russians Buryats
- Time zone: UTC+08 (IRKT)
- Postal code: 666137
- Dialing code: +7 39558

Uzury (from Buryat: γзγγр - tip, top, edge) is a village in the Olkhonsky District of Irkutsk region of Russia, a part of the Khuzhirskiy municipal unit. Located in the Bay Haga-Yaman of Lake Baikal at the Eastern shore of Olkhon Island in 30 km northeast from the municipal unit centre — village Khuzhir.

A permanent meteorological station and a laboratory of the Siberian Institute of the Earth's crust are operating in the village. Population: 9 (2010 census); consists mainly of the staff of meteorological station.

The Bay Haga-Yaman is known for its archaeological sites of the Neolithic period (4th—2nd millennia BC) and Late Iron Age (5th—10th century AD). In a cave near the village a Neolithic burial was found in 1956. The archaeological findings include fragments of pottery, items made of bone, arrowheads and an axe.

== Gallery ==
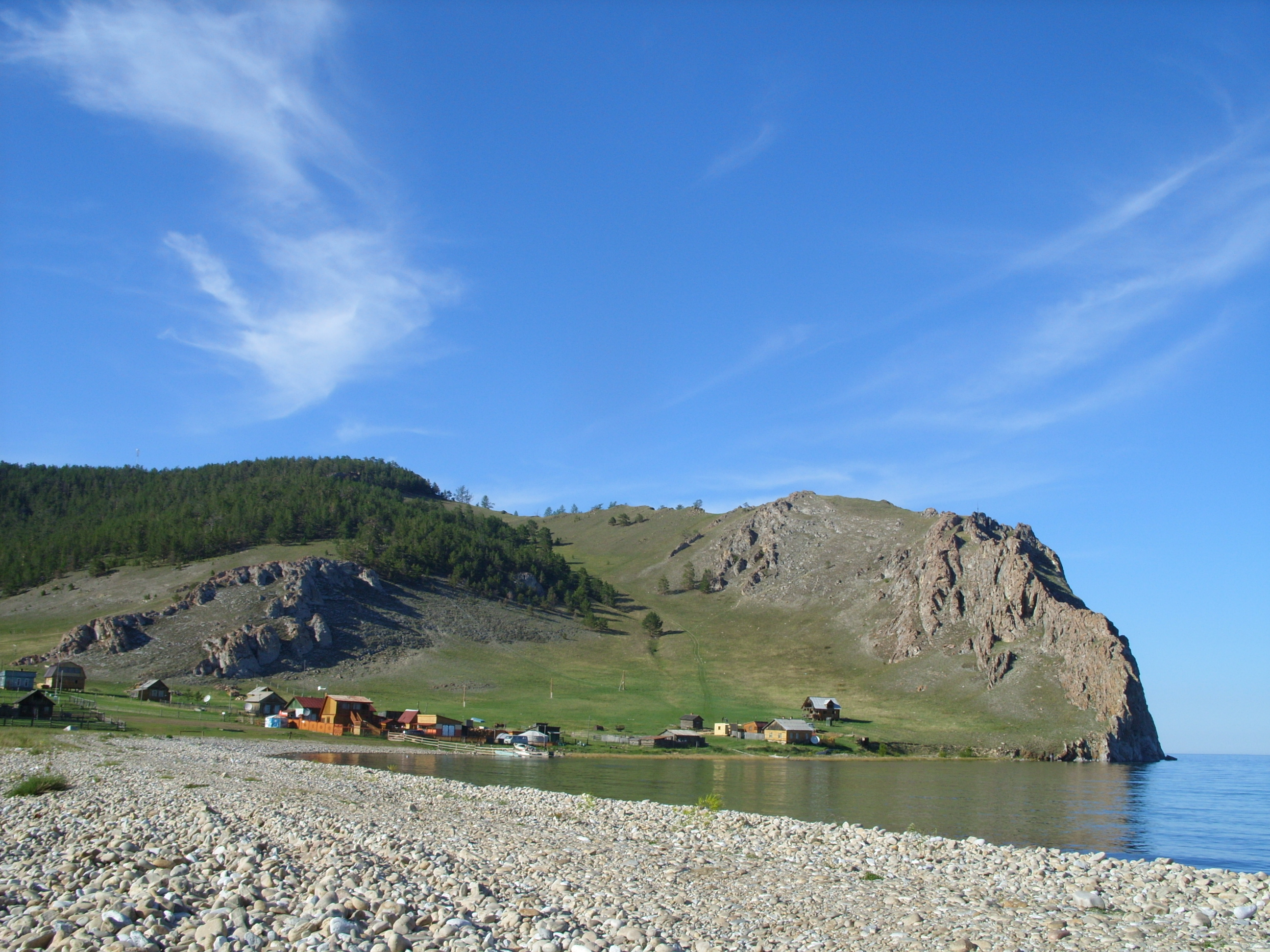
Uzury and Talgoy mountain

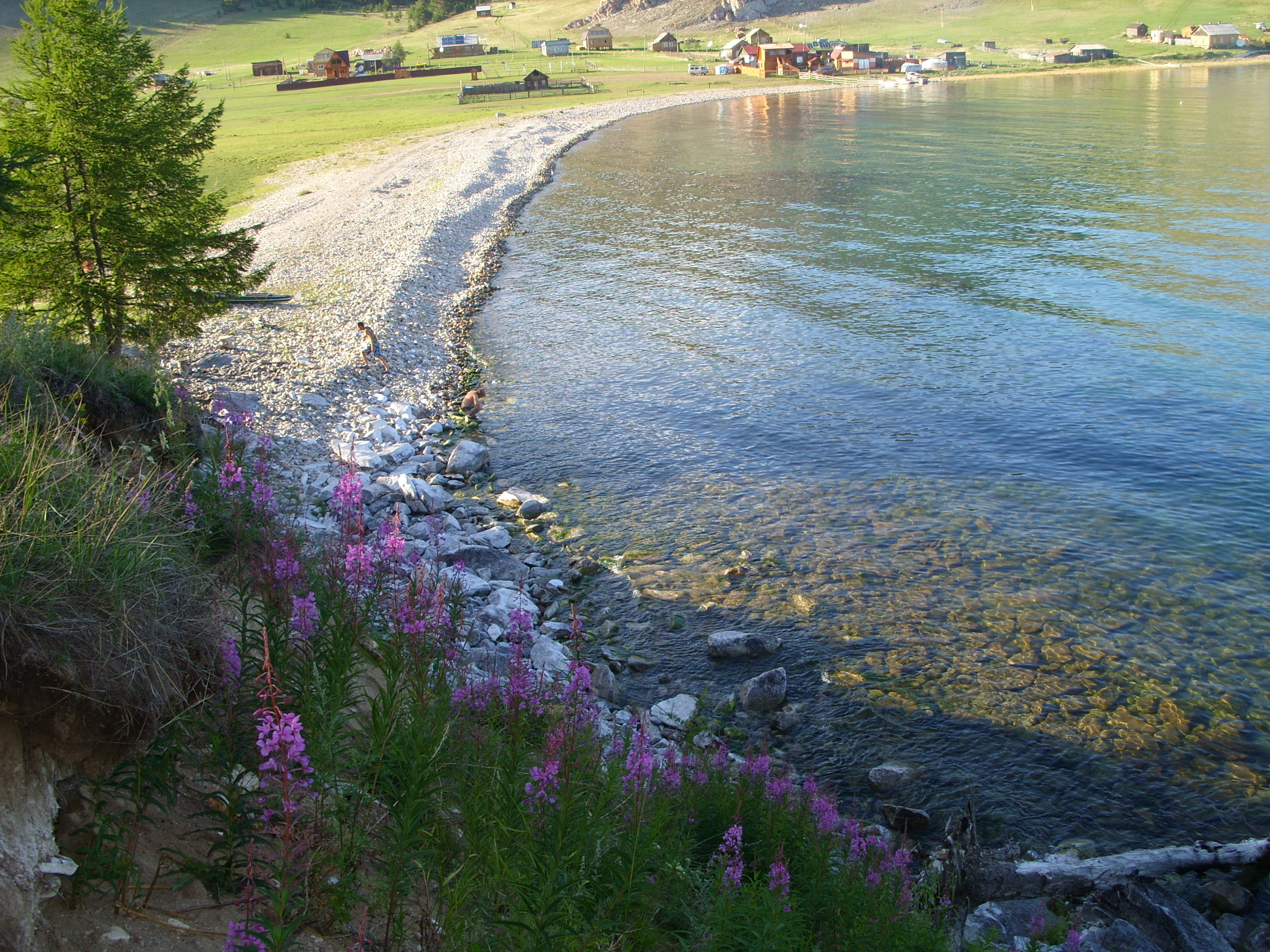
The Bay Haga-Yaman

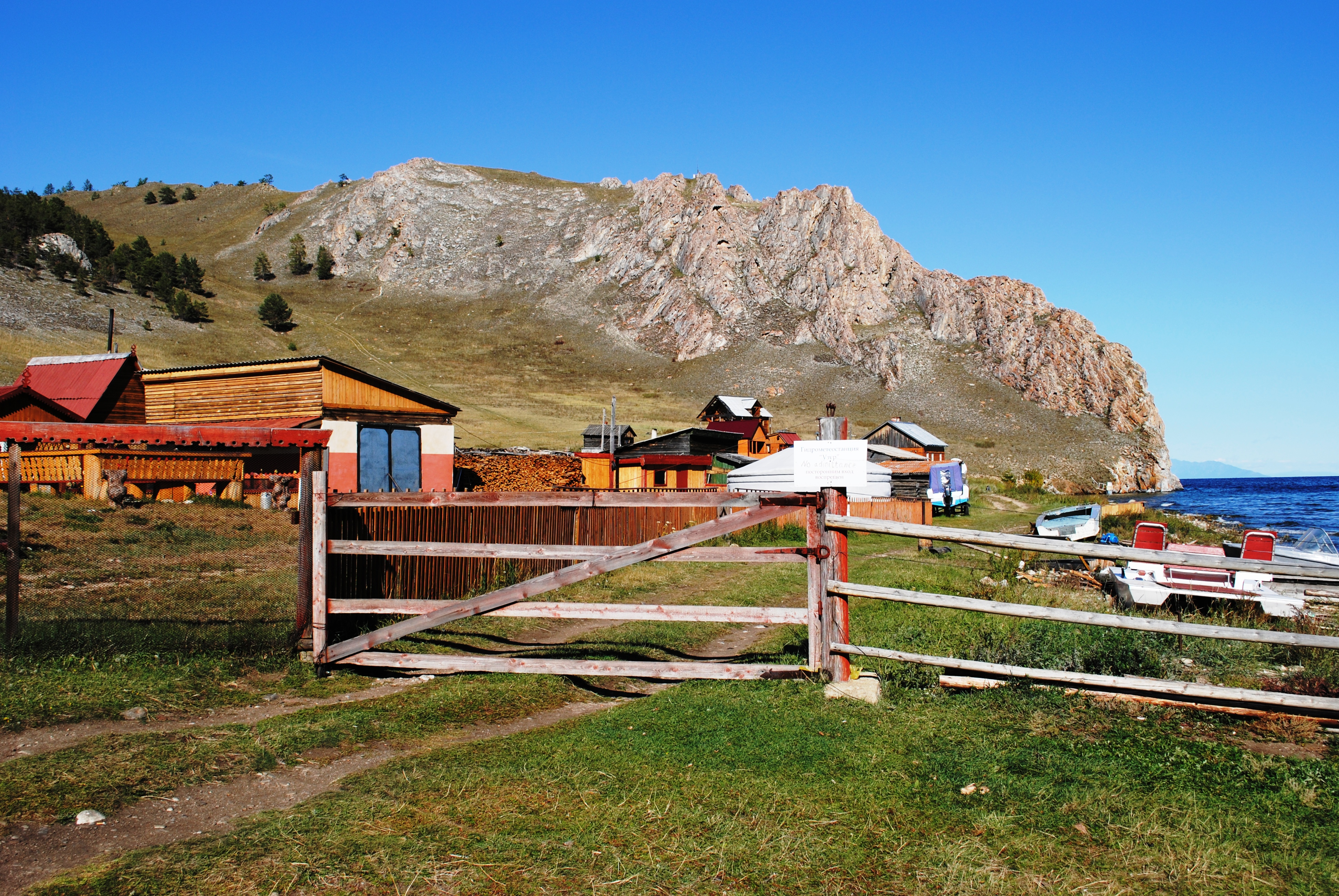
A house in Uzury
