= Khuzhir =

Khuzhir (Russian: Хужир) is the name of several rural localities in Russia:

- Khuzhir, Dzhidinsky District, Republic of Buryatia, a settlement at the station in Dyrestuysky Somon of Dzhidinsky District of the Republic of Buryatia
- Khuzhir, Okinsky District, Republic of Buryatia, a selo in Burungolsky Somon of Okinsky District of the Republic of Buryatia
- Khuzhir, Zakamensky District, Republic of Buryatia, a ulus in Khuzhirsky Somon of Zakamensky District of the Republic of Buryatia
- Khuzhir, Irkutsk Oblast, a settlement in Olkhonsky District of Irkutsk Oblast, approximately 1500 residents.
