= Khuzhir Airport =

Khuzhir (Kharantsy) Хужир (Харанцы)
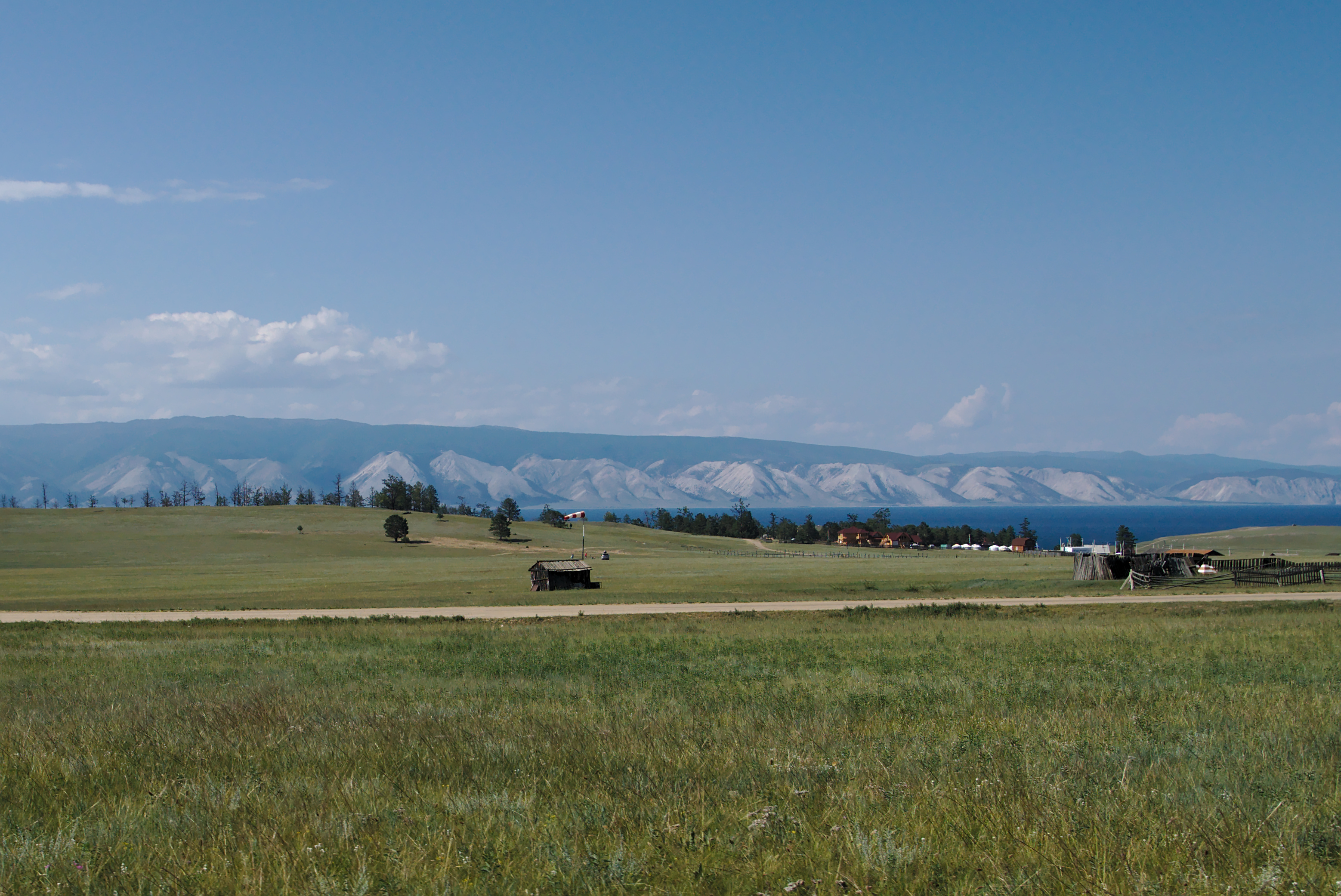
- IATA: none; ICAO: UIIH

Summary
- Airport type: Public
- Serves: Khuzhir, Olkhon Island
- Location: Kharantsy, Olkhonsky District; Irkutsk Oblast; Russia
- Opened: 1957
- Time zone: +8 (UTC+8:00)
- Elevation AMSL: 1,624 ft / 495 m
- Coordinates: 53°13′04″N 107°24′35″E

Map

Runways
Direction	Length		Surface
Direction	ft	m	Surface
08/26	1,837	560	unpaved

Khuzhir (Kharantsy) is an airport on Lake Baikal’s Olkhon Island servicing Khuzhir village. It's located near to Kharantsy.

The airport has humble facilities which were built in the middle of the 20th century.

Regular flights were cancelled in 1999, and only private planes occasionally have landed there. But even when it happened, old airport manager was keeping the runway and facilities on standby at all times on own initiative until he died in 2018. He believed regular flights from the island would be resumed.

SiLa airlines has revived regular carriage of passengers from/to there just only in September 2019.

== Facilities ==
The airport is capable of taking such aircraft suited to landing on unpaved airstrips as Antonov An-2, Antonov An-28, Cessna 208 Caravan.

== Airlines and destinations ==
Airlines	Destinations	Aircraft type	Notes
(Russia) SiLa	Ulan-Ude — Irkutsk	An-28	Tuesday, Thursday, Saturday
