= Kharantsy =

Kharantsy may refer to one of the following:

- Kharantsy, Olkhonsky District, a village in the Olkhonsky District of Irkutsk region of Russia
- A cape in the middle part of the western coast of Olkhon Island
- A bay in the middle part of the western coast of Olkhon Island
- An island in the Maloe More strait of Lake Baikal
