= List of airports in Irkutsk Oblast =

List of airports in Irkutsk Oblast (Russian Federation).

City served	ICAO	IATA	Airport name	Note
			International airports	
Irkutsk	UIII	IKT	International Airport Irkutsk	
Bratsk	UIBB	BTK	Bratsk Airport	
			Domestic airports	
Ust-Kut	UITT	UKX	Ust-Kut Airport	
Bodaybo	UIKB		Bodaybo Airport	
Erbogachen	UIKE		Erbogachen Airport	
Kazachinskoe	UITK		Kazachinskoye Airport	The airport was closed
Kirensk	UIKK		Kirensk Airport	
Khuzhir	UIIH		Khuzhir Airport	
Mama	UIKM		Mama Airport	
Nizhneudinsk	UINN		Nizhneudinsk Airport	
Ust-Ilimsk	UIBS	UIK	Ust-Ilimsk Airport	The airport was closed in 2001.
Zheleznogorsk	UIBV		Zheleznogorsk Airport	
			Sports aerodromes	
Irkutsk	XIIO		Aerodrom Oyok	
			Military air bases	
Usolye-Sibirskoye	UIIB		Belaya (air base)	
			Experimental aerodromes	
Irkutsk	UIIR		Irkutsk Northwest Airport	

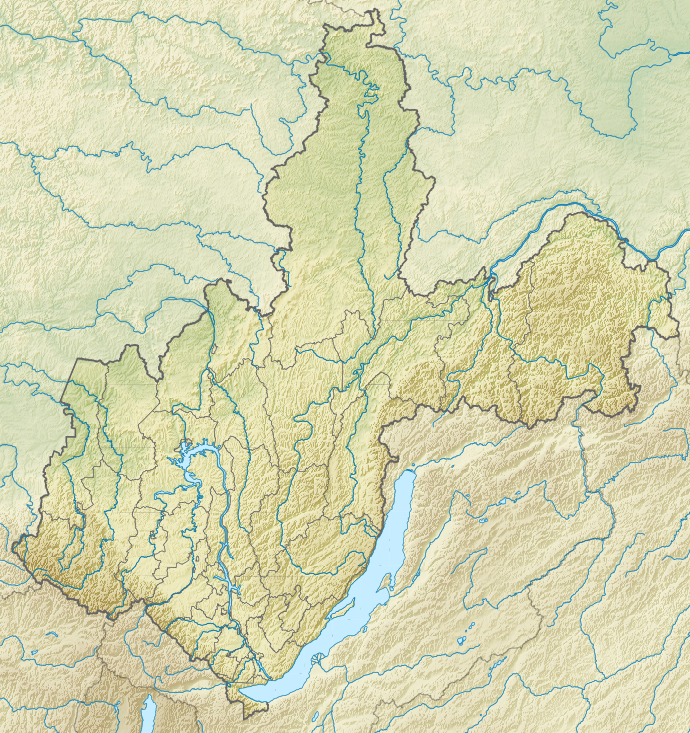
Location of airports in Irkutsk Oblast
