= Shaman Rock =

Rock on Lake Baikal, Russia

Shaman Rock, Shamanka
- Rock formation
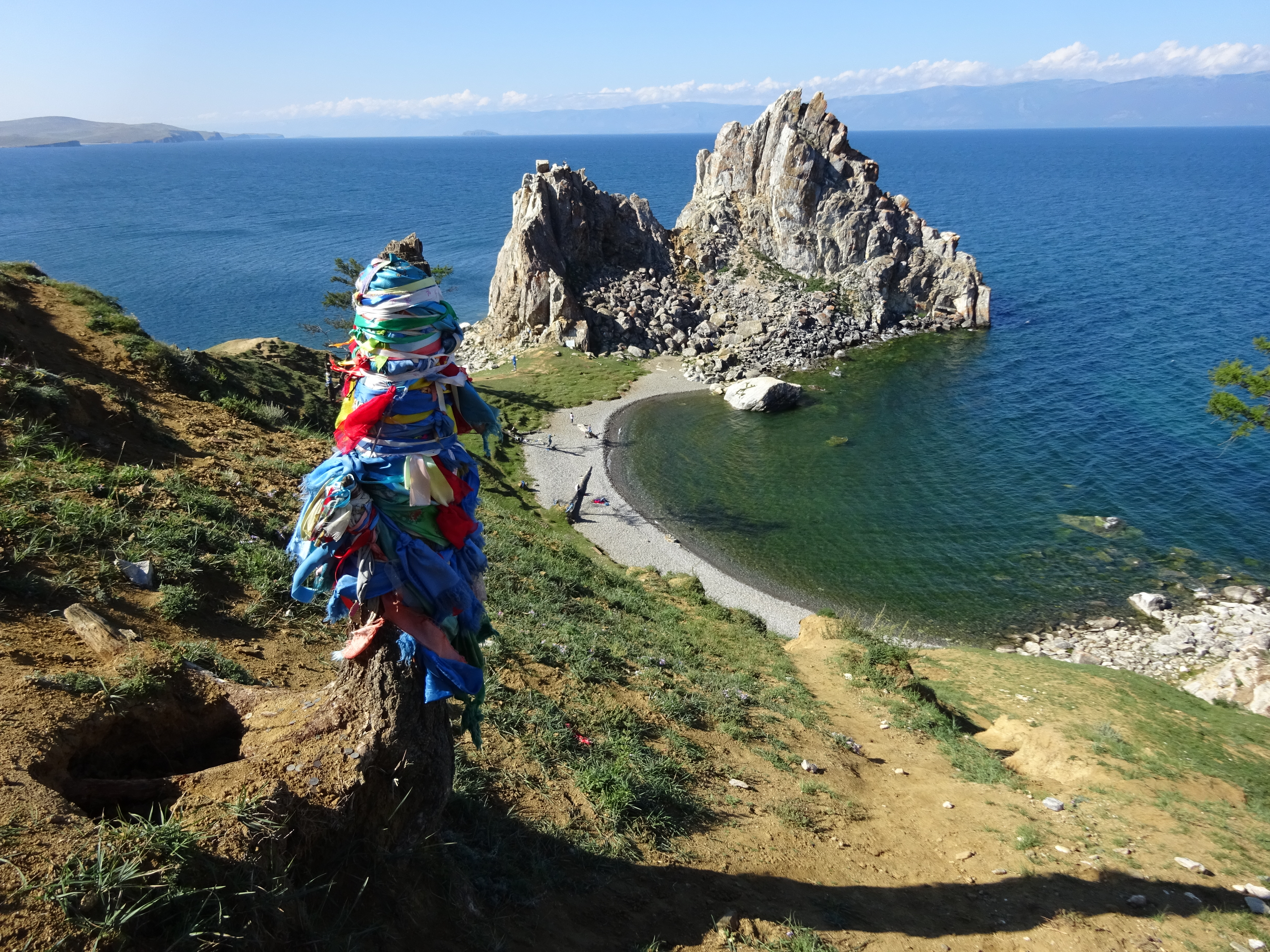
- Shaman Rock, Shamanka, and a serge, left-hand side
- Interactive map of Shaman Rock, Shamanka
- Coordinates: 53°12′14″N 107°20′29″E
- Location: Russia
- Water bodies: Lake Baikal

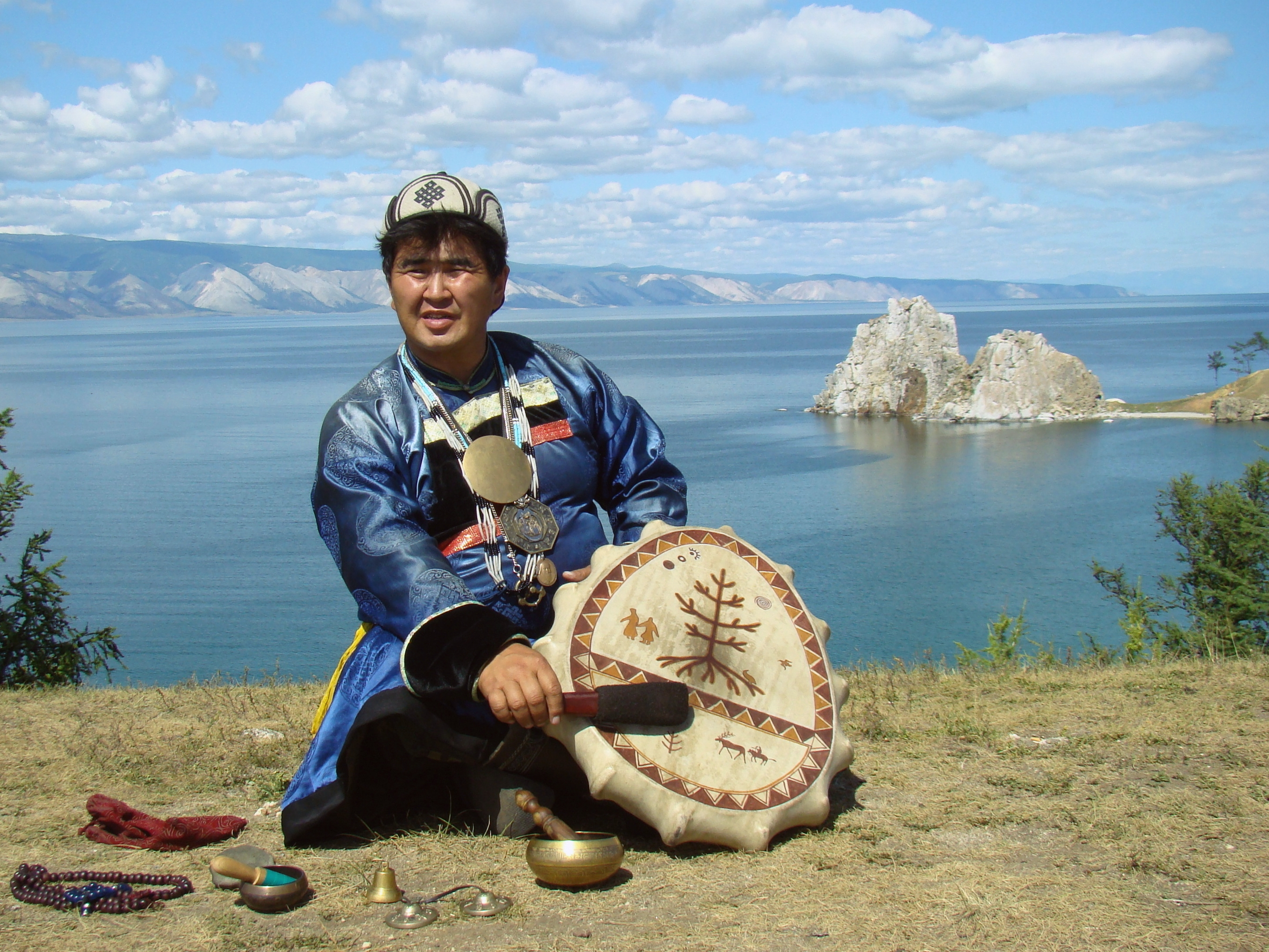
A shaman in front of Shaman Rock, a Buryat. Olkhon Island

Shaman Rock, Cape Burhan, or Shamanka is a rock, on Olkhon Island, Lake Baikal, Russia. It is in Pribaikalsky National Park, and is near Khuzhir, the largest city on Olkhon Island.

The rock connects to Olkhon Island, though depending on perspective, can appear an island.

The rock is considered one of the "Nine Holy Sites of Asia".

== On the rock ==
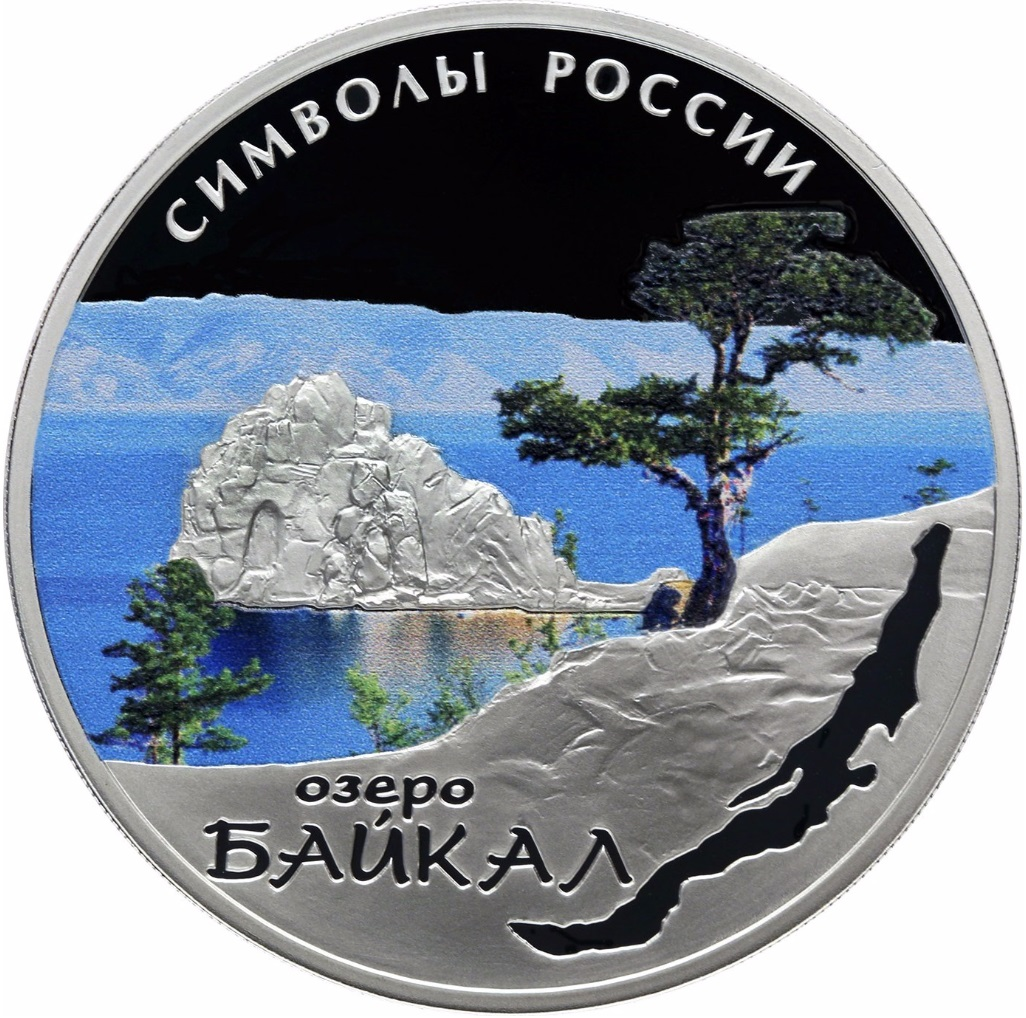
Commemorative coin

The height of the part of the rock closest to the shore is 30 metres (98 ft), and the height of the far part is 42 metres (138 ft).

In the near-bank part of the rock is the Shaman Cave, which formed via weathering and erosion. The length of the cave is about 12 metres (39 ft), and the width is from 3 metres (9.8 ft) to 4.5 metres (15 ft). The height of the cave is from 1 metre (3.3 ft) to 6.5 metres (21 ft).

On the western side of the surface of the back of the rock there is a natural brown rock formation resembling a dragon.

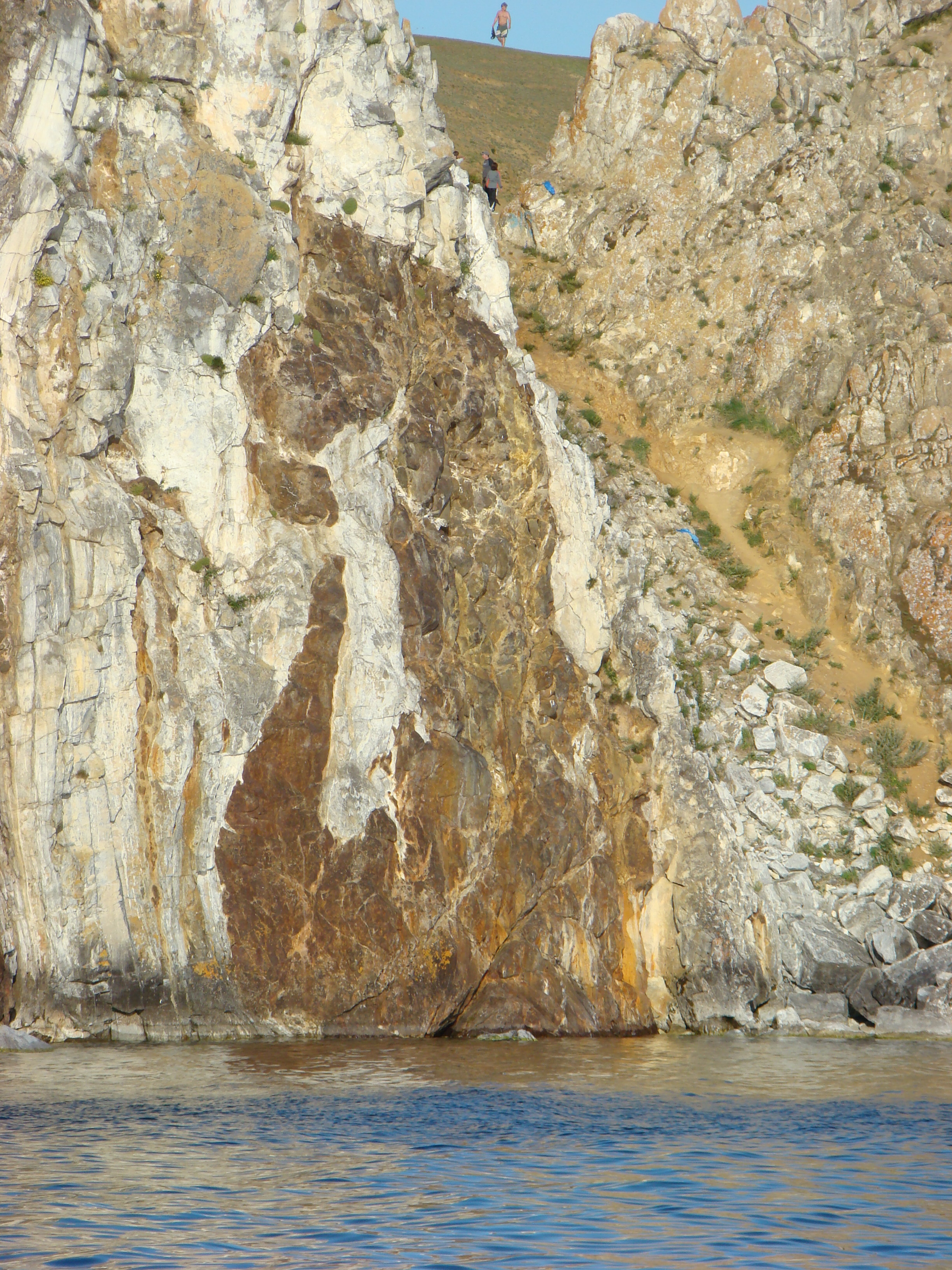
The image resembles a dragon.

== See also ==
- Buddhism
- Maloe More
- Tibetan Buddhism
