= Kharantsy, Olkhonsky District =

Kharantsy Харанцы
- Village
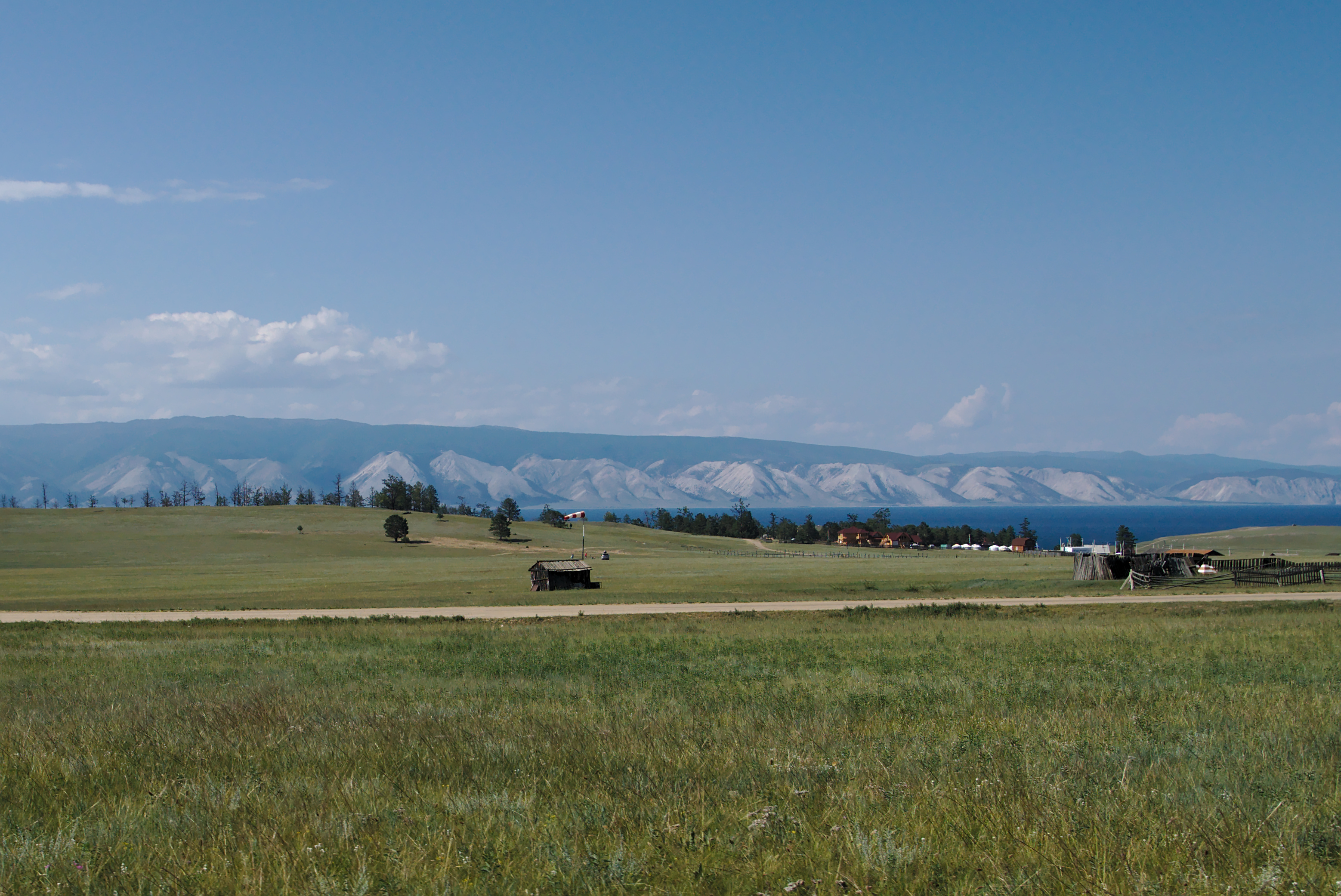
- Kharantsy with airstrip in foreground

- Location within Russia
- Coordinates: 53°13′16″N 107°25′12″E
- Country: Russia
- Federal subject: Irkutsk Oblast
- Administrative district: Olkhonsky District
- Municipal unit: Khuzirskiy

Population (2010)
  - Total: 97
  - Ethnicities: Russians Buryats
- Time zone: UTC+08 (IRKT)
- Postal code: 666137

Kharantsy (Russian: Хар́анцы) is a village in Olkhonsky District, Irkutsk Oblast, Russia, a part of the Khuzhirskiy municipal unit. Located in the middle part of the western coast of Olkhon Island, in 7 km to the north from the municipal unit centre, village Khuzhir. Population: 97 (2010 census);

In the village there are several hostels for the tourists (Turbazas). In the summer a recreation camp for children is operating. Near the village a grass airstrip is located that serves flights to Irkutsk and local sightseeing flights.

At the Cape Kharantsy near the village, many archaeological findings are made. On its south-eastern slope a burial from the 11th to 15th century was found; in the western part - the remains of settlements dated 5 millennium BC - 10 century AD. The archaeological findings include a quiver, an iron spear, knives, arrowheads and fragments of pottery.
