= Yelantsy =

Rural locality in Irkutsk Oblast, Russia

Coordinates: 52°47′58″N 106°24′21″E

Yelantsy (Russian: Еланцы) is a rural locality (a selo) and the administrative center of Olkhonsky District of Irkutsk Oblast, Russia. Population: 4,009 (2010 census); 3,762 (2002 census); 3,362 (1989 Soviet census).
