= Khuzhir, Irkutsk Oblast =

Rural locality on Olkhon Island, Lake Baikal

Khuzhir
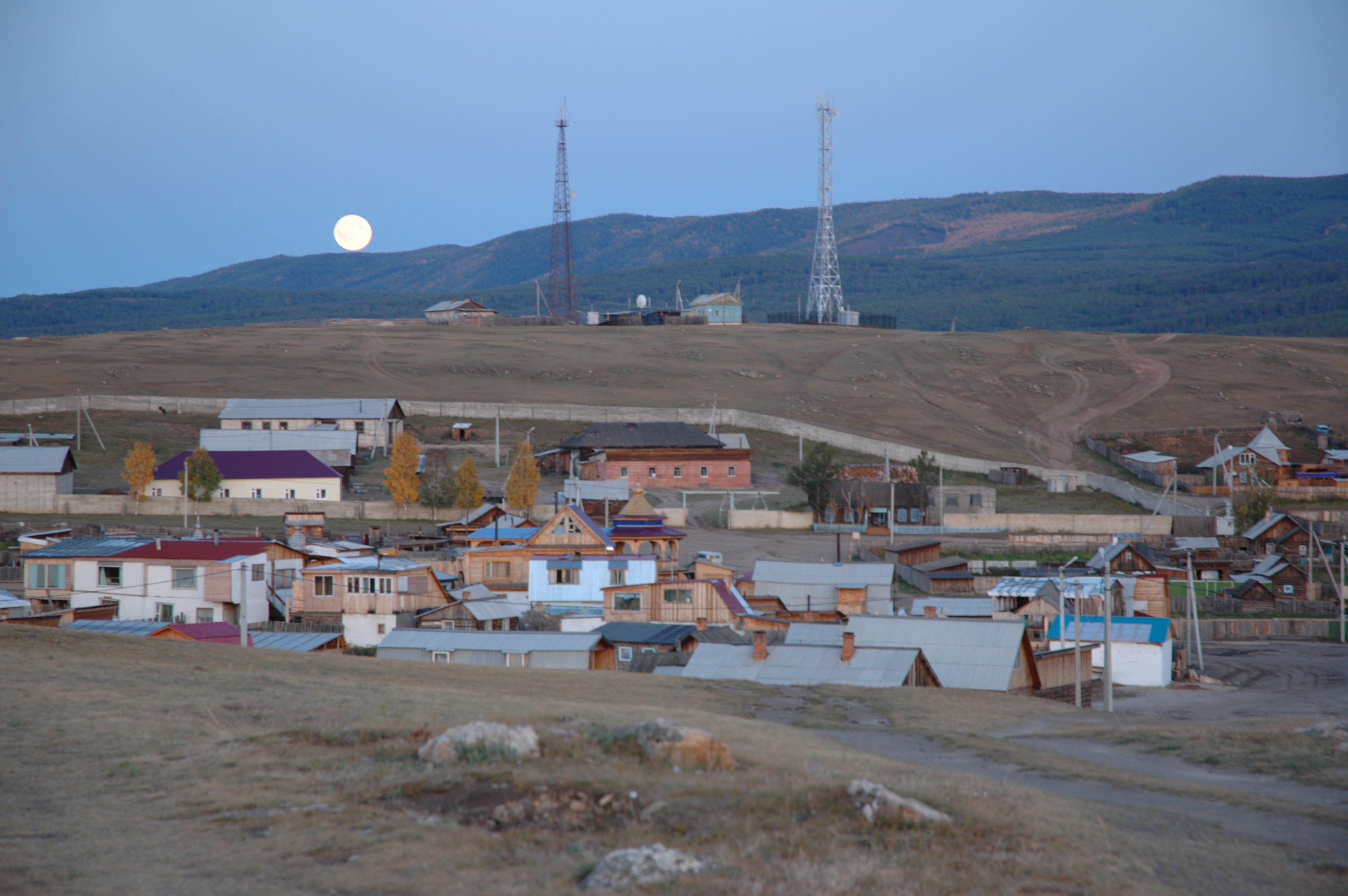

- Location within Irkutsk Oblast Location within Russia
- Coordinates: 53°11′36″N 107°20′38″E
- Country: Russia
- Region: Irkutsk Oblast
- District: Olkhonsky District

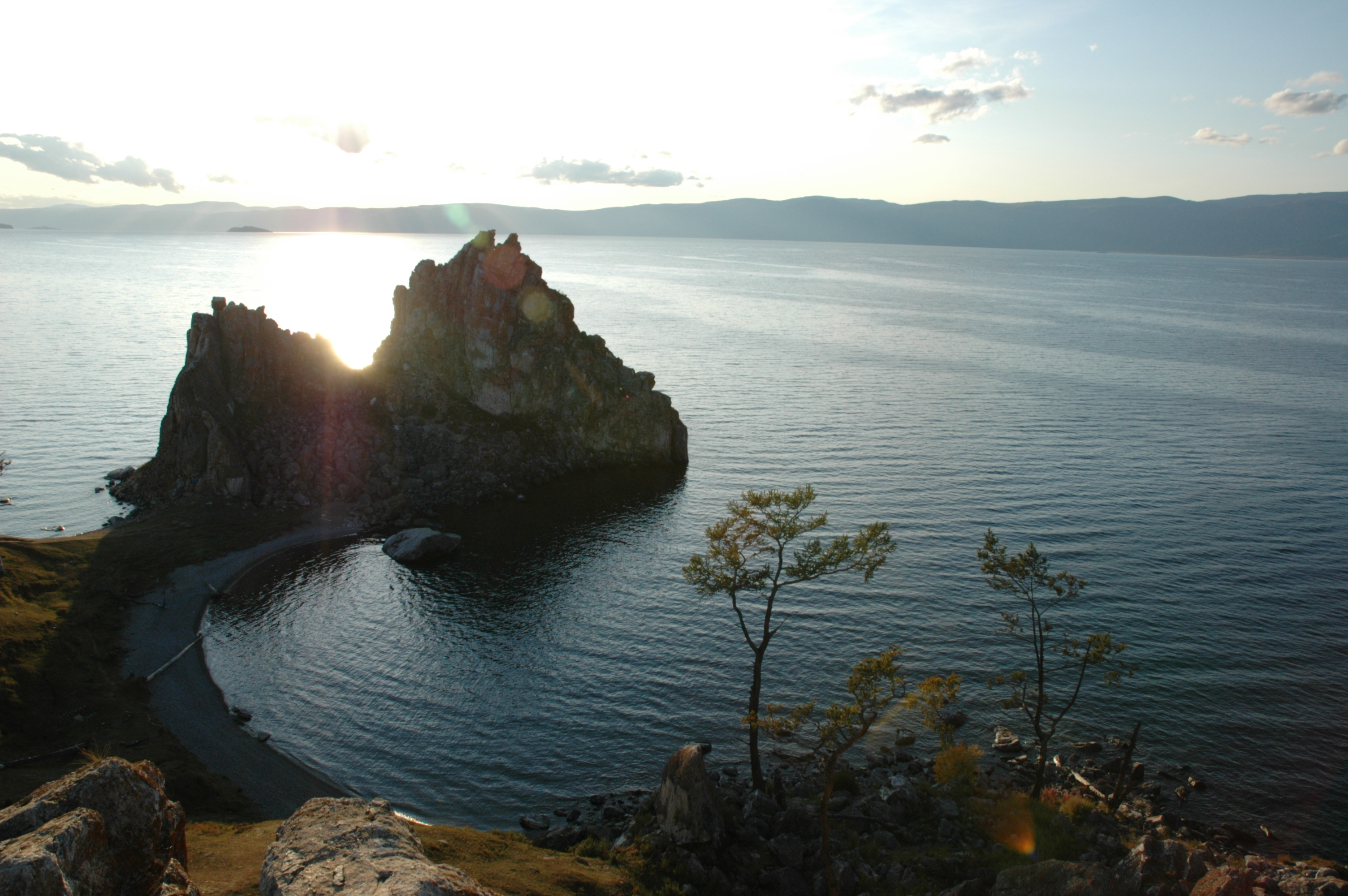
The Shaman Rock as seen from Khuzhir, looking west and south across Lake Baikal

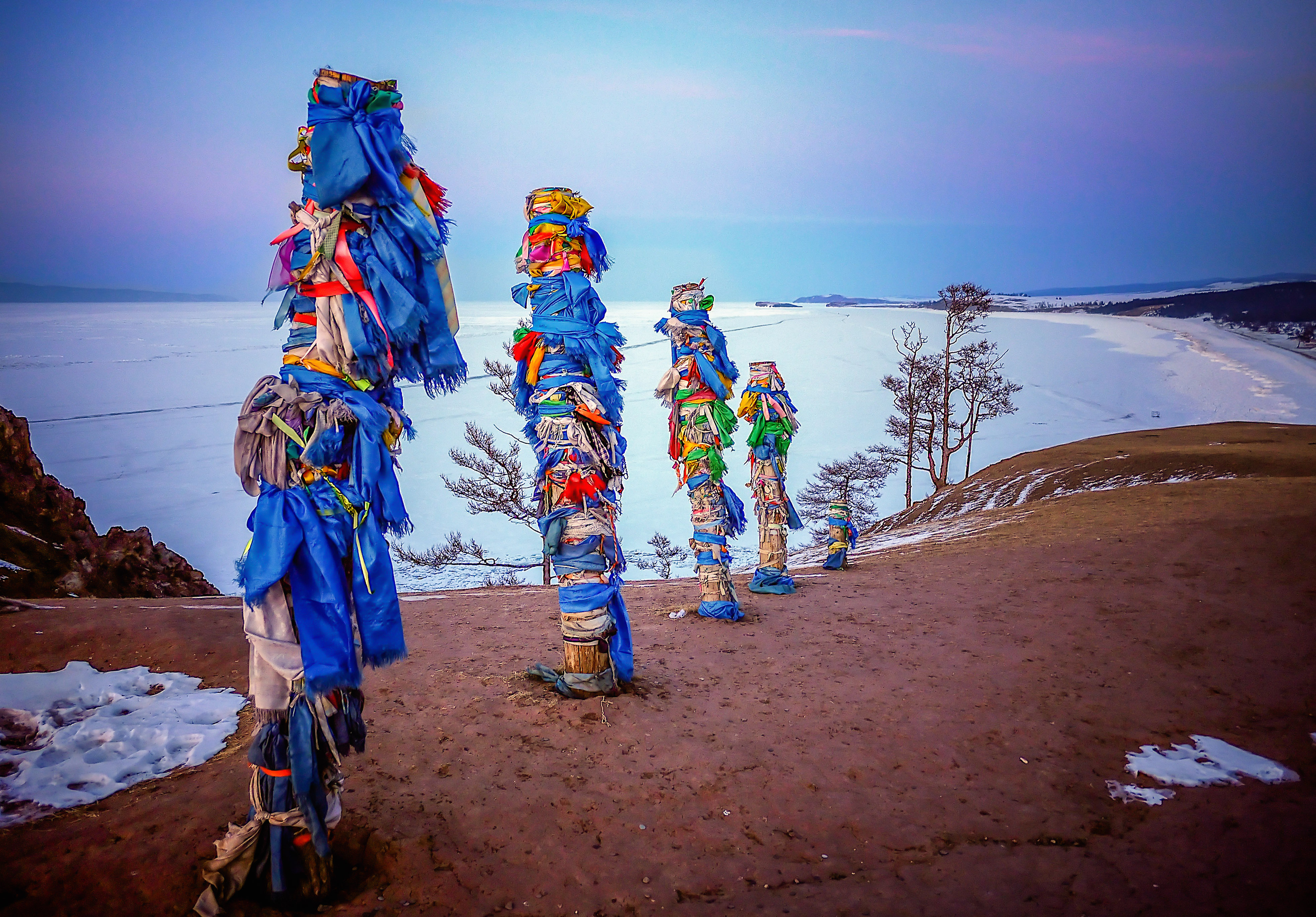
Shamanic poles (serge) just next to the Shaman rock

Khuzhir (Russian: Хужир) is a rural locality (a settlement) in Olkhonsky District of Irkutsk Oblast, Russia, located on the west side of the Olkhon Island, the largest island in Lake Baikal. Population: 1,251 (2010 census); 1,148 (2002 census); 1,219 (1989 Soviet census).

Until June 2014, it had work settlement status.
