= Khuzhir, Zakamensky District, Republic of Buryatia =

Khuzhir Хужир
- Ulus
- Location within Republic of Buryatia Location within Russia
- Coordinates: 50°25′N 103°16′E
- Country: Russia
- Region: Republic of Buryatia
- District: Zakamensky District
- Time zone: UTC+8:00

Khuzhir (Russian: Хужир; Buryat: Хужар, Khujar) is a rural locality (an ulus) in Zakamensky District, Republic of Buryatia, Russia. The population was 357 as of 2010. There are 7 streets.

== Geography ==
Khuzhir is located 16 km north of Zakamensk (the district's administrative centre) by road. Zakamensk is the nearest rural locality.
