= Khuzhir, Okinsky District, Republic of Buryatia =

Khuzhir Хужир
- Selo
- Location within Republic of Buryatia Location within Russia
- Coordinates: 52°47′N 99°51′E
- Country: Russia
- Region: Republic of Buryatia
- District: Okinsky District
- Time zone: UTC+8:00

Khuzhir (Russian: Хужир; Buryat: Хужар, Khujar) is a rural locality (a selo) in Okinsky District, Republic of Buryatia, Russia. The population was 625 as of 2010. There are 9 streets.

== Geography ==
Khuzhir is located 55 km north of Orlik (the district's administrative centre) by road. Shuluta-Tala is the nearest rural locality.
