= Serge (post) =

Hitching post used by Buryats and Yakuts

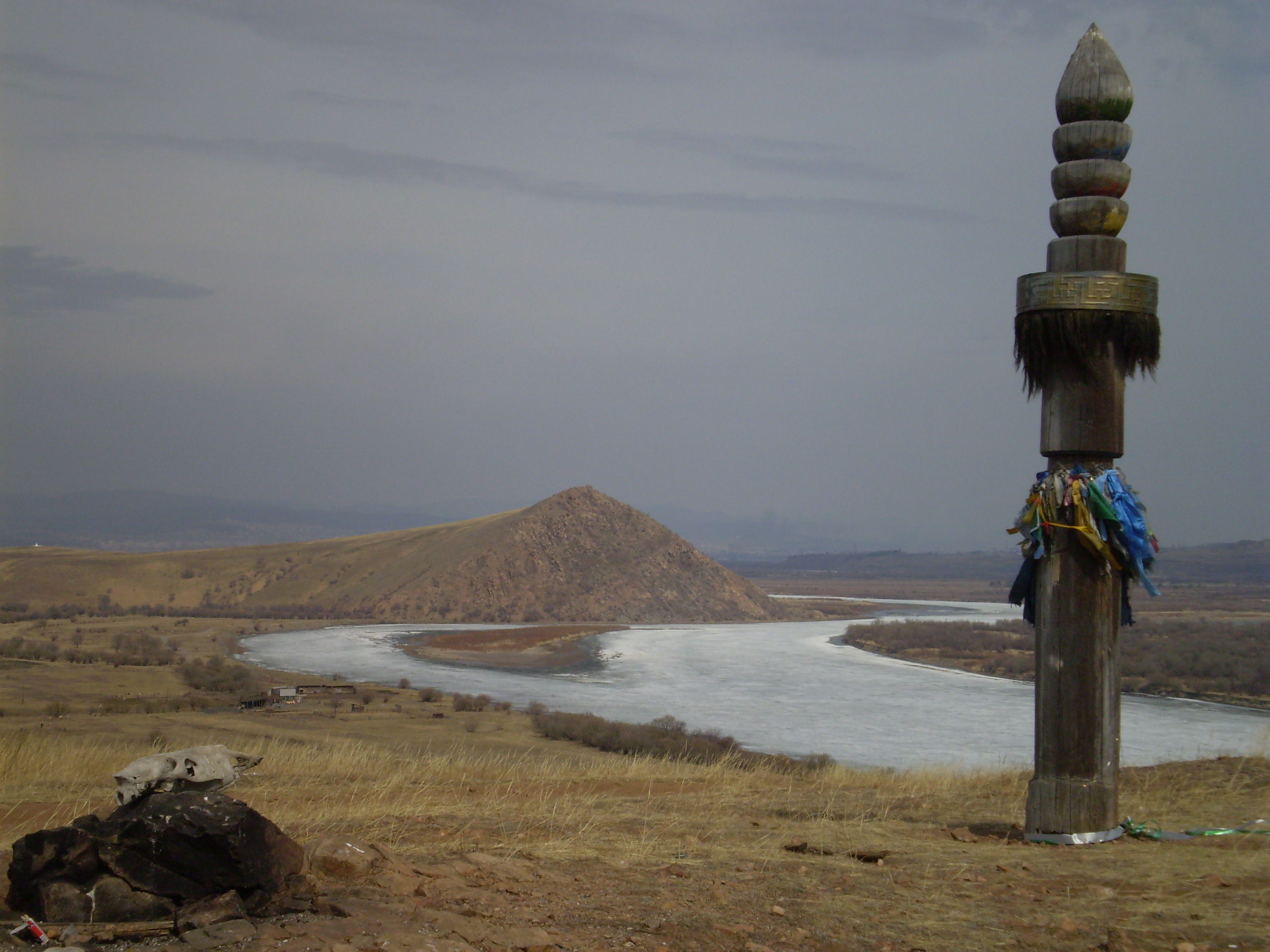
Serge at Gesera Camp (Стоянка Гэсэра) near the Selenga river

A serge (Buryat: сэргэ; lit. 'tethering post') is a hitching post, property marker, and ritual pole used among the Buryats and Yakuts.

== Property marker ==
The serge is placed to indicate that the place in question has an owner. For example, a serge stands as a pole at the entrance to a yurt or at the gate of a house to indicate that as long as the serge is there, the family will live there. Traditionally, a serge cannot be destroyed, but can only decay.

== Religious use ==
The serge is connected to the horse cult, as both the hosts and the guests tied their horses to it. It is also a symbol of the world tree that unites the three worlds: Three horizontal grooves are cut on the pole, the upper one intended to bind the horses of the heavenly inhabitants of the upper world, the middle one intended for the horses of men, and the lower one for the horses of the underworld.

Three serges made from birch trees (generally dug up by the roots) were used at the initiation of the shaman. One has ribbons tied to it, the colors of the ribbons indicating whether the shaman is to be a black or yellow shaman, or serve both good and evil. Another has a bell attached to it and a horse, as a sacrifice. A third is to be climbed by the new shaman. For black shamans, this rite is called shanar; for yellow shamans, shandroo (or altan serge, "golden hitch").

At the cemeteries of the shamans very high serges were placed for the unification of gods and spirits. Serges in the form of stone obelisks were also placed on these cemeteries (deer stones). The most famous of these stones is the Altan Serge ("golden pole") located in the Tamchinsky datsan, in the Buryat village Gusinoye Ozero.

== Gallery ==
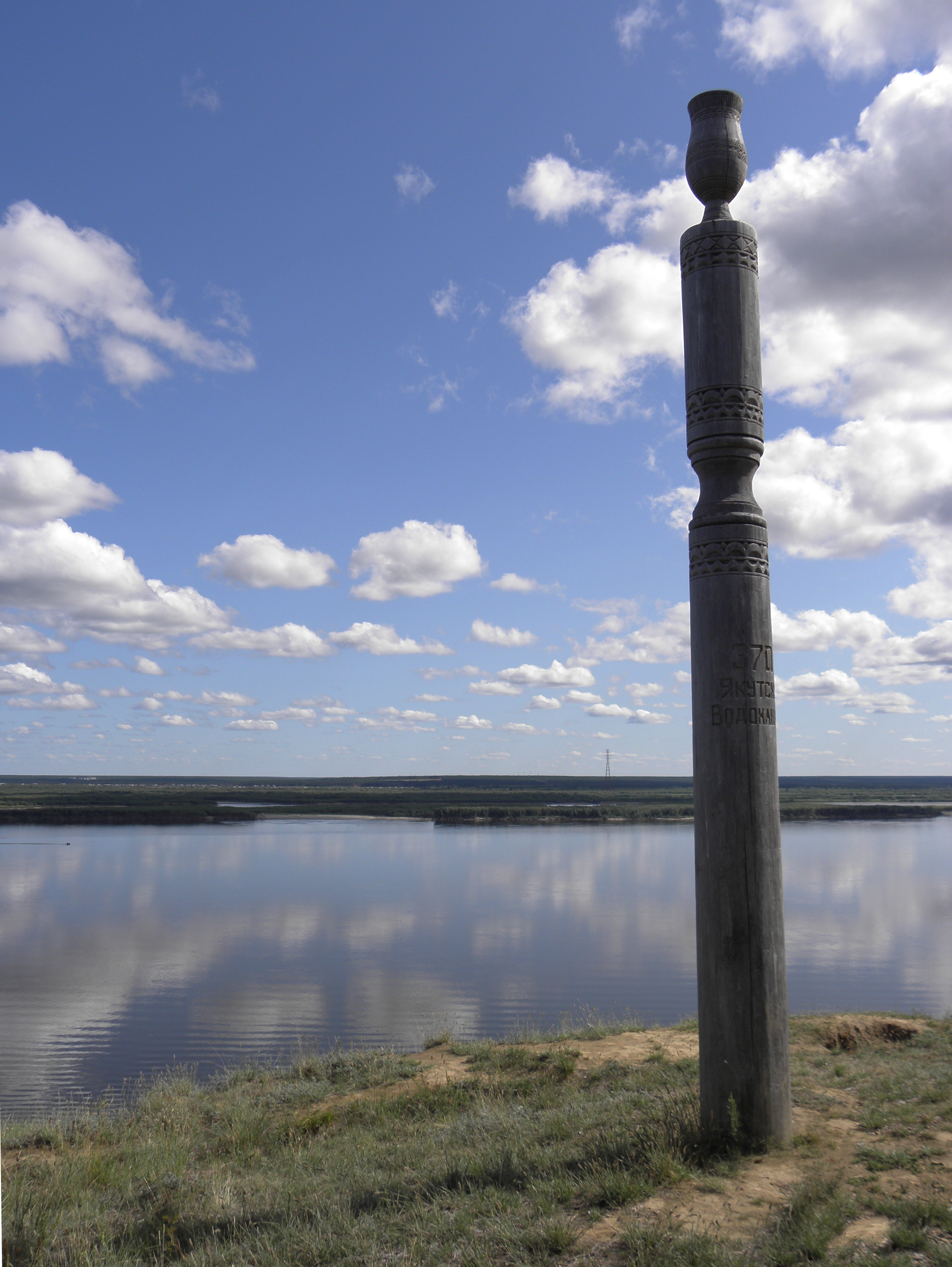
Serge at Staraya Tabaga at the Lena river

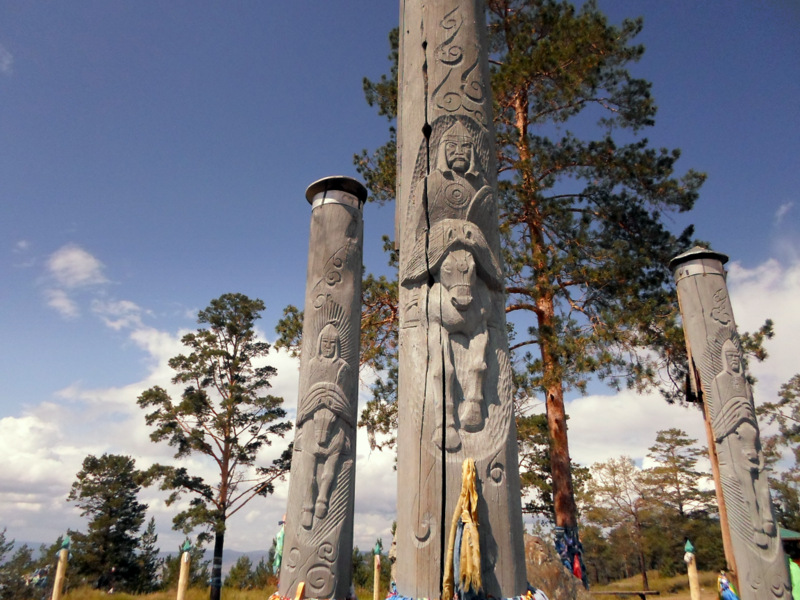
Serges at Gesera Camp on a mountain pass of the Monostoy range in Buryatia

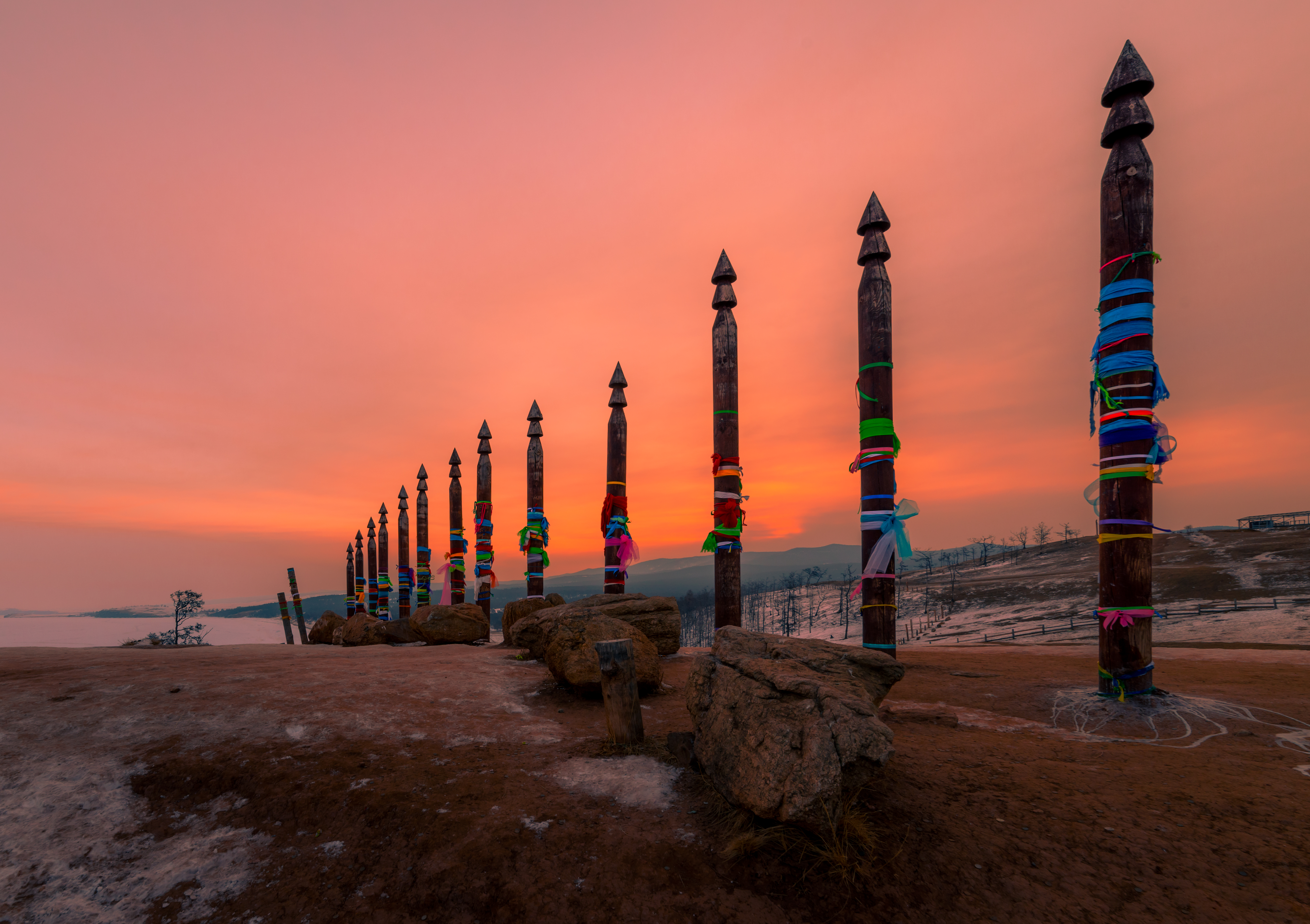
A series of serges at Cape Burhan on Olkhon Island on Lake Baikal

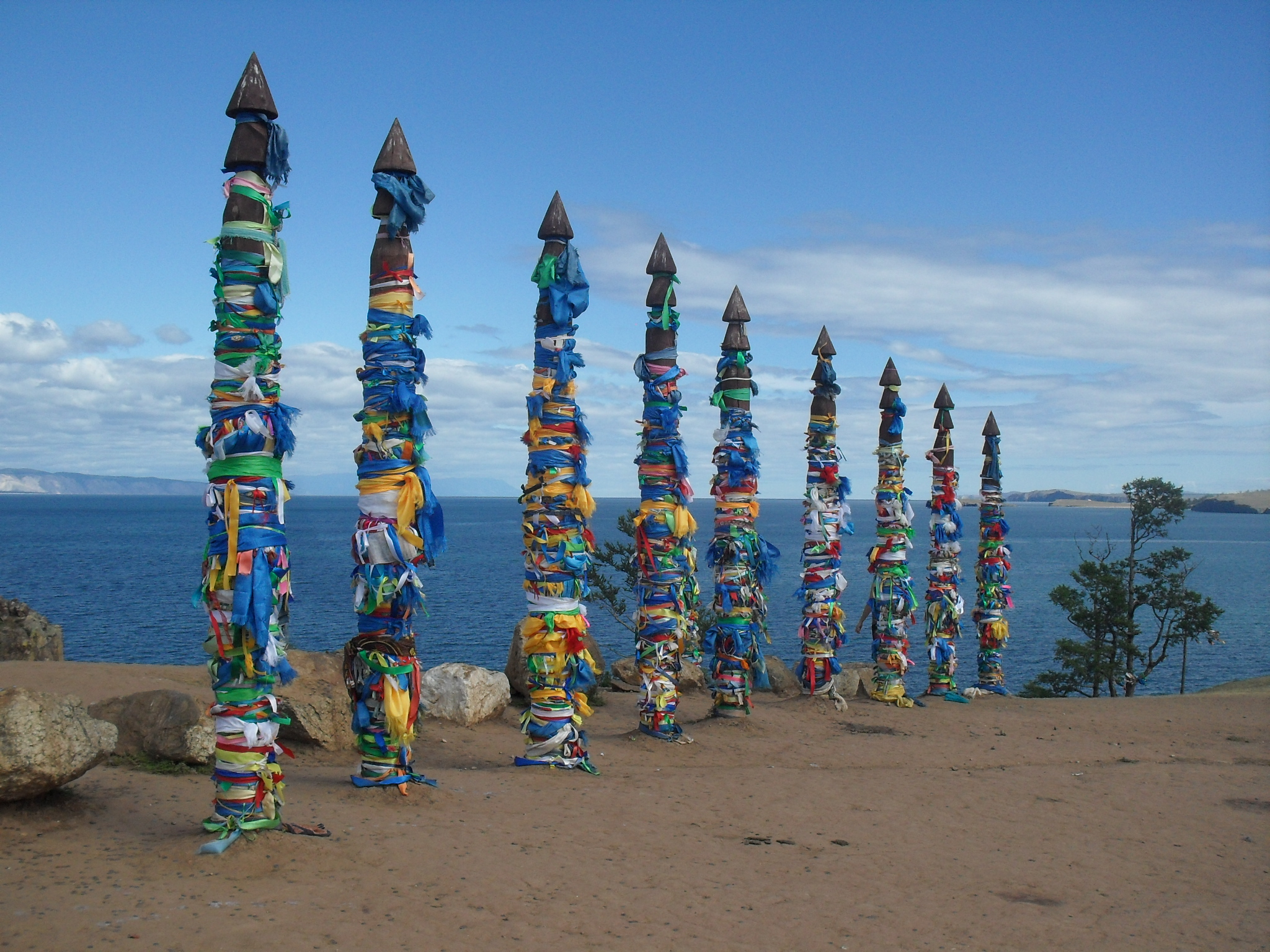
Serges heavily adorned with ribbons and scarves at Cape Burhan on Olkhon Island

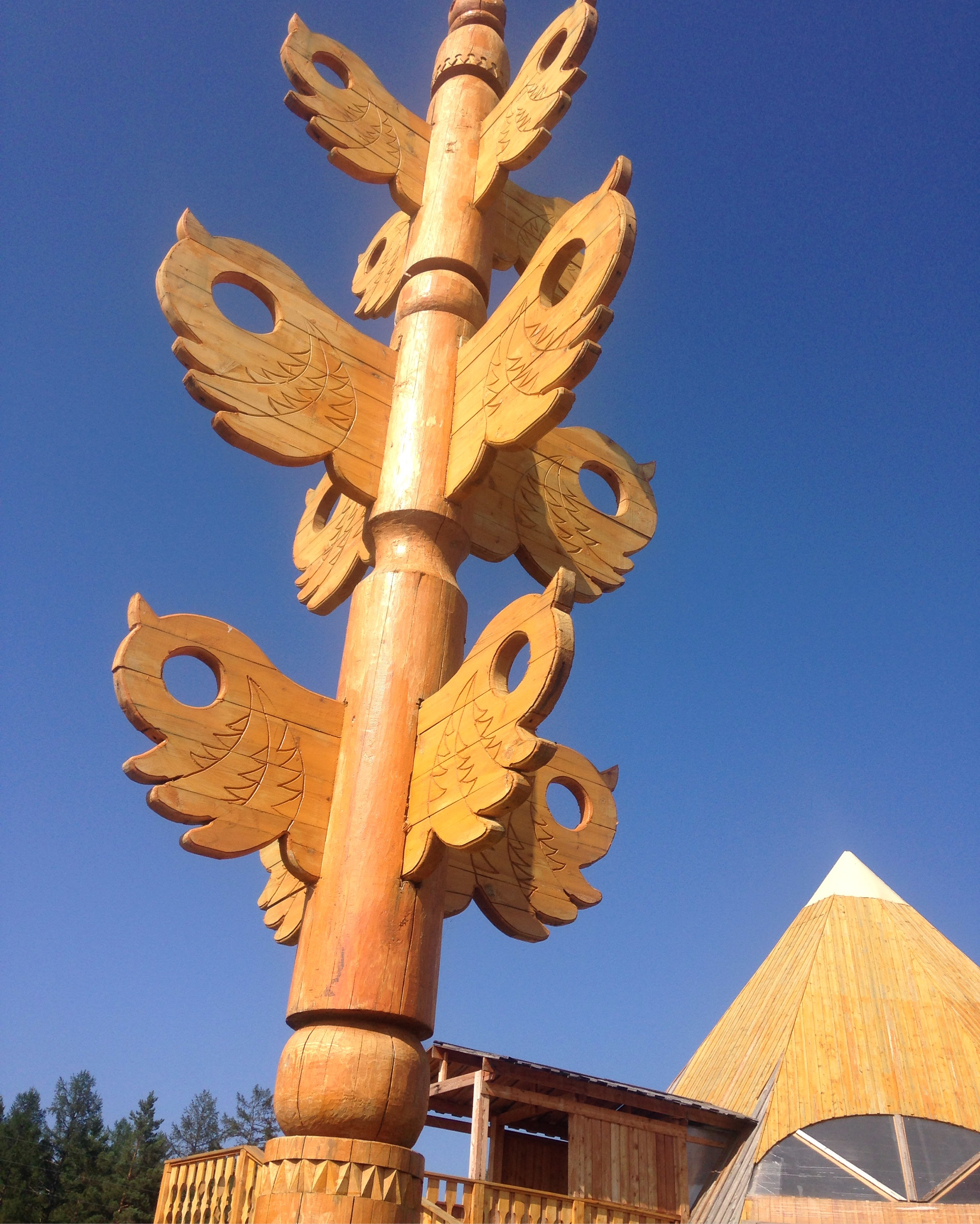
A serge in the Amginsky District of the Sakha Republic

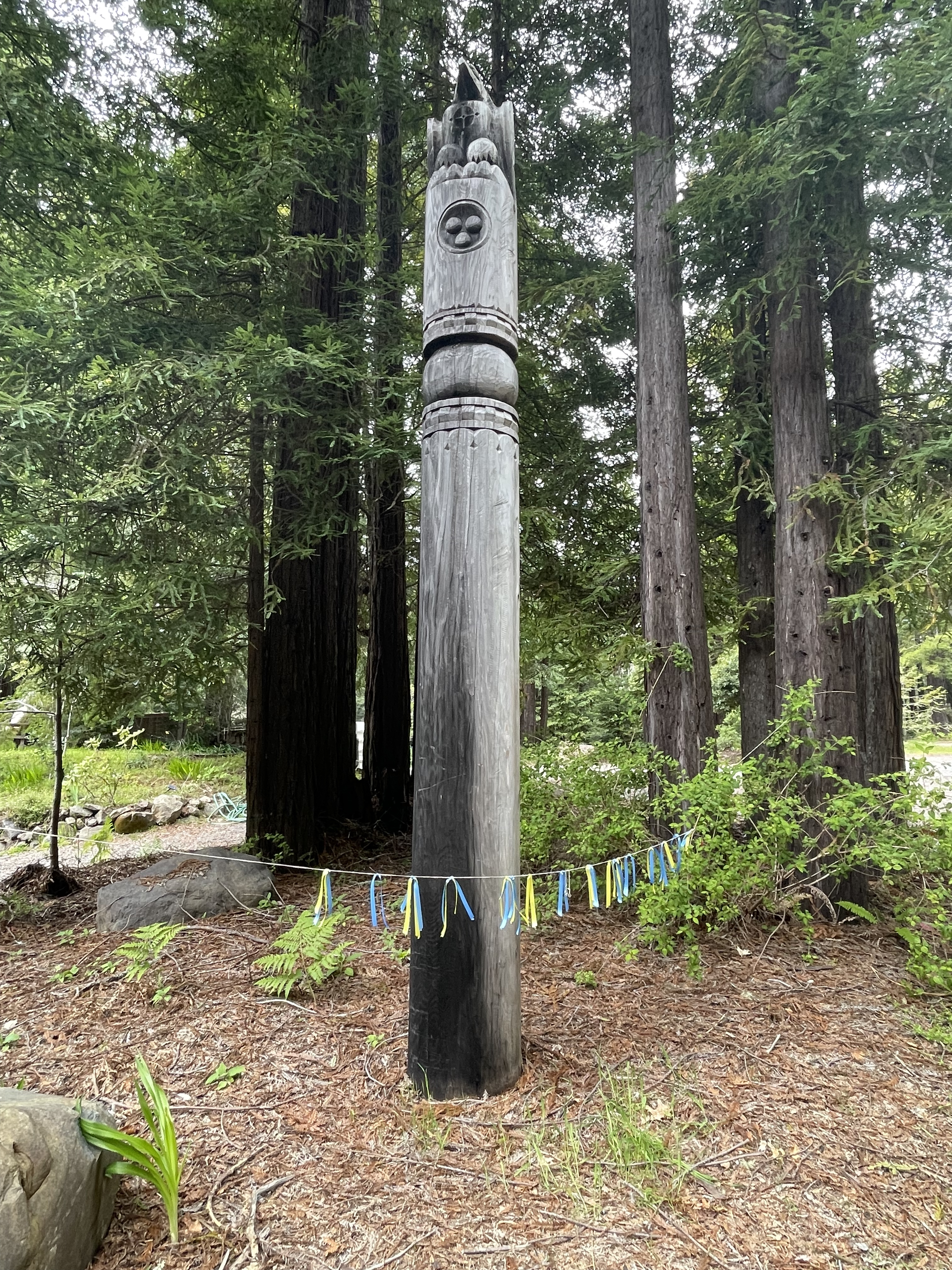
A serge of the Sakha Republic at the Gualala Arts Center in Gualala, California

== See also ==
- Ceremonial pole – Stake or post used in ritual practice
- Horse culture – Tribal culture which revolves around horses
  - Horse culture in Mongolia
- Inuksuk – Inuit built stone landmark or cairn in Inuit cultures
- Khatag – Traditional ceremonial scarf in Tibetan Buddhism, often tied to landmarks
- Totem pole – Monumental carvings by Indigenous peoples of the Pacific Northwest
- House mark – Property marker
