= Khuzhir, Dzhidinsky District, Republic of Buryatia =

Khuzhir Хужир
- Settlement
- Location within Republic of Buryatia Location within Russia
- Coordinates: 50°34′N 106°11′E
- Country: Russia
- Region: Republic of Buryatia
- District: Dzhidinsky District
- Time zone: UTC+8:00

Khuzhir (Russian: Хужир; Buryat: Хужар, Khujar) is a rural locality (a settlement) in Dzhidinsky District, Republic of Buryatia, Russia. The population was 31 as of 2010.

== Geography ==
Khuzhir is located 71 km southeast of Petropavlovka (the district's administrative centre) by road. Zarubino is the nearest rural locality.
