= Olkhon Island =

Largest island of Lake Baikal, in eastern Siberia

Coordinates: 53°09′24″N 107°23′01″E

Olkhon
Native name: остров Ольхон (Russian); Ойхон арал (Buryat)
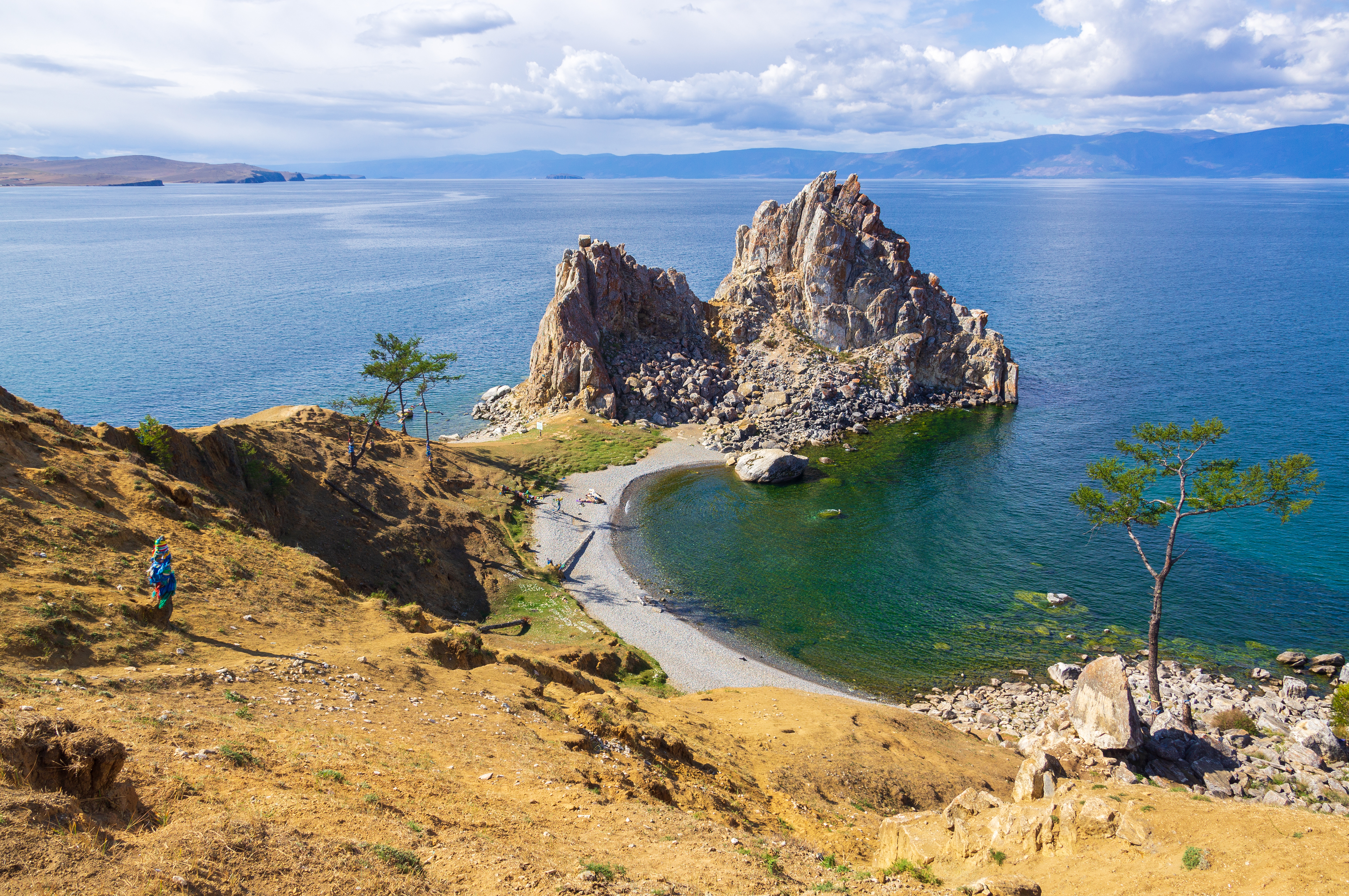
- Shamanka Rock near Khuzhir

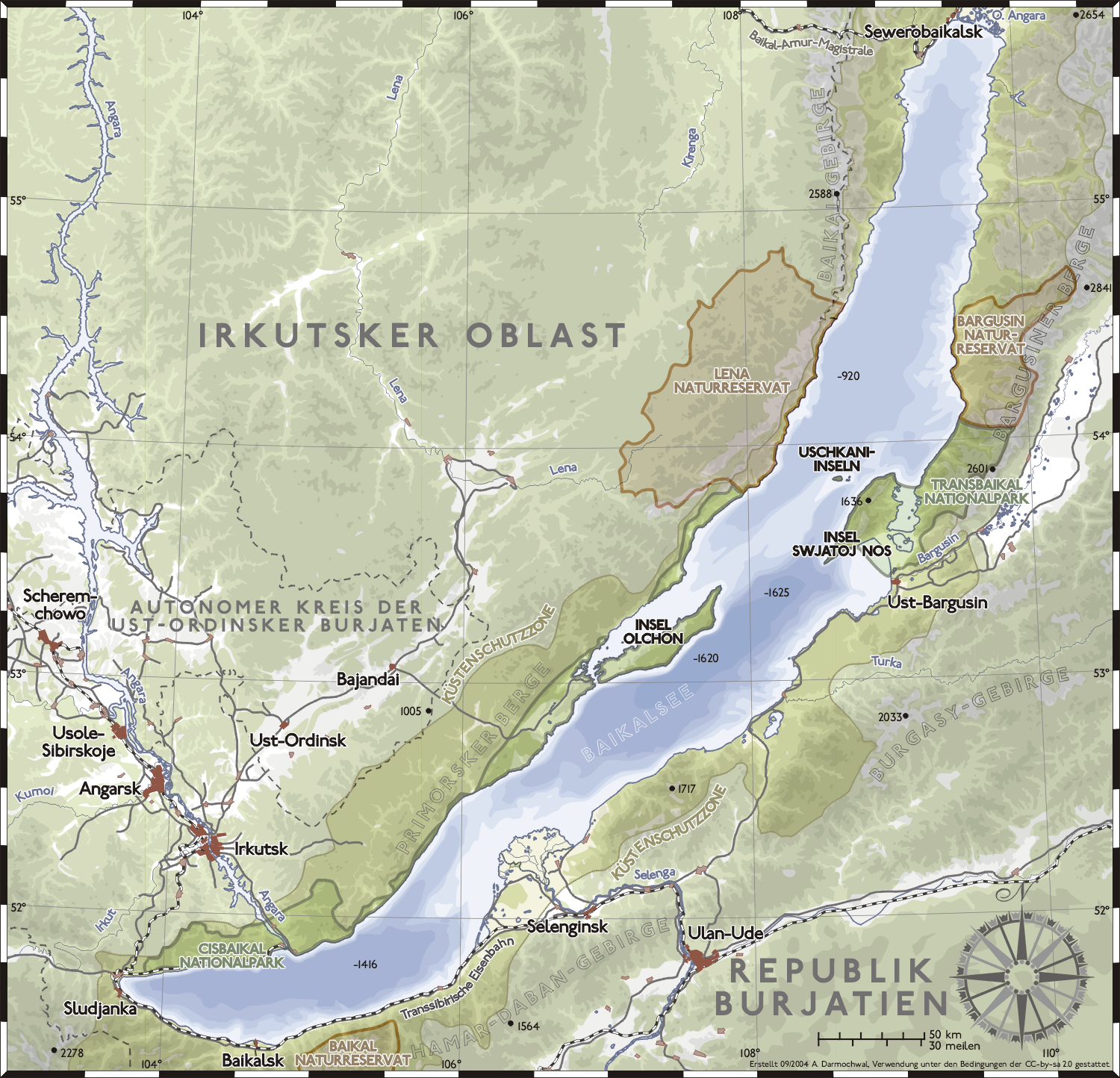

Geography
- Location: Lake Baikal
- Area: 730 km^{2} (280 sq mi)
- Length: 72 km (44.7 mi)
- Width: 21 km (13 mi)
- Highest elevation: 1,276 m (4186 ft); 818 m (2,684 ft) above lake level.
- Highest point: Mount Zhima

Administration
- Russia
- District: Siberia
- Subject: Irkutsk Oblast
- Capital city: Khuzhir

Demographics
- Population: 1,744
- Ethnic groups: Buryats, Russians

Olkhon (Russian: Ольхо́н; Buryat: Ойхон, Oikhon) is by far the largest island in Lake Baikal in eastern Siberia and, with an area of 730 km^{2} (280 sq mi), the fourth-largest lake island in the world. It. Structurally, it constitutes the southwestern margin of the Academician Ridge. The island measures 71.5 km (44.4 mi) in length and 20.8 km (12.9 mi) in width.

There are two versions regarding the origin of the name of the island and both are derived from the language of the Buryats, the indigenous people of Olkhon. The first is that the island's name comes from the word oyhon – “woody”, and the second is that it comes from olhan – “dry”. It is still debated which of the two is the actual origin of the name Olkhon as both words describe the island perfectly. Much of the island is still covered by forests and the amount of precipitation is extremely low – about 240 mm (9.4 in) per year.

== Geography ==
Olkhon has a dramatic combination of terrain and is rich in archaeological landmarks. Steep mountains line its eastern shore, and at 1,276 m (4,186 ft) above sea level, Mount Zhima is the highest point on the island, peaking at 818 m (2,684 ft) above the water level of Lake Baikal. The island is large enough to have its own lakes, and features a combination of taiga, steppe and even a small desert. A deep strait separates the island from the land.

The island's appearance is a result of millions of years of tectonic movement resulting in the hollowing of the channel between the land (Maloe More Sound and Olkhon Gate Strait) and the block of stone forming the island. The steep slopes of the mountains show the vertical heave of the earth.

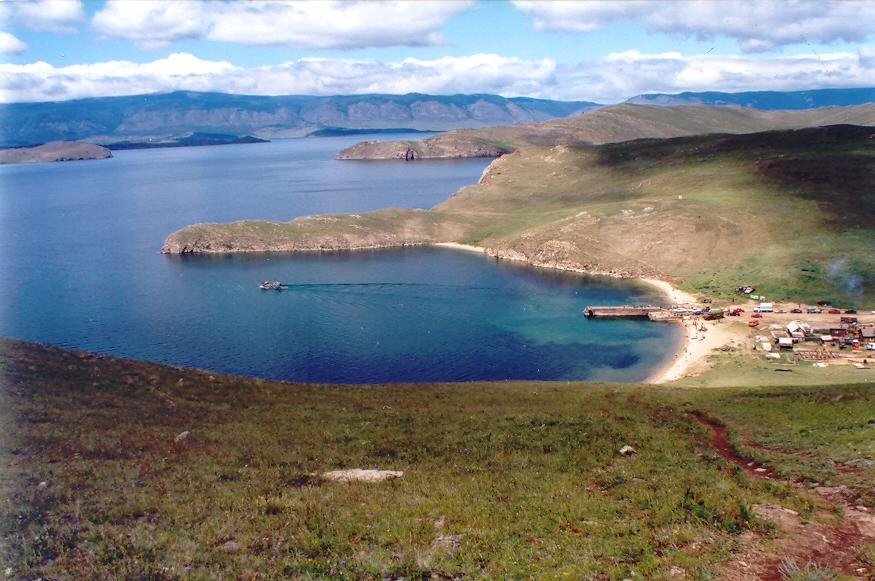
View over the Maloje More Strait from the island with the Primorsky Range in the background

== Population ==
The population of the island is around 1,744 and consists mostly of Buryats, the island's aboriginal people.

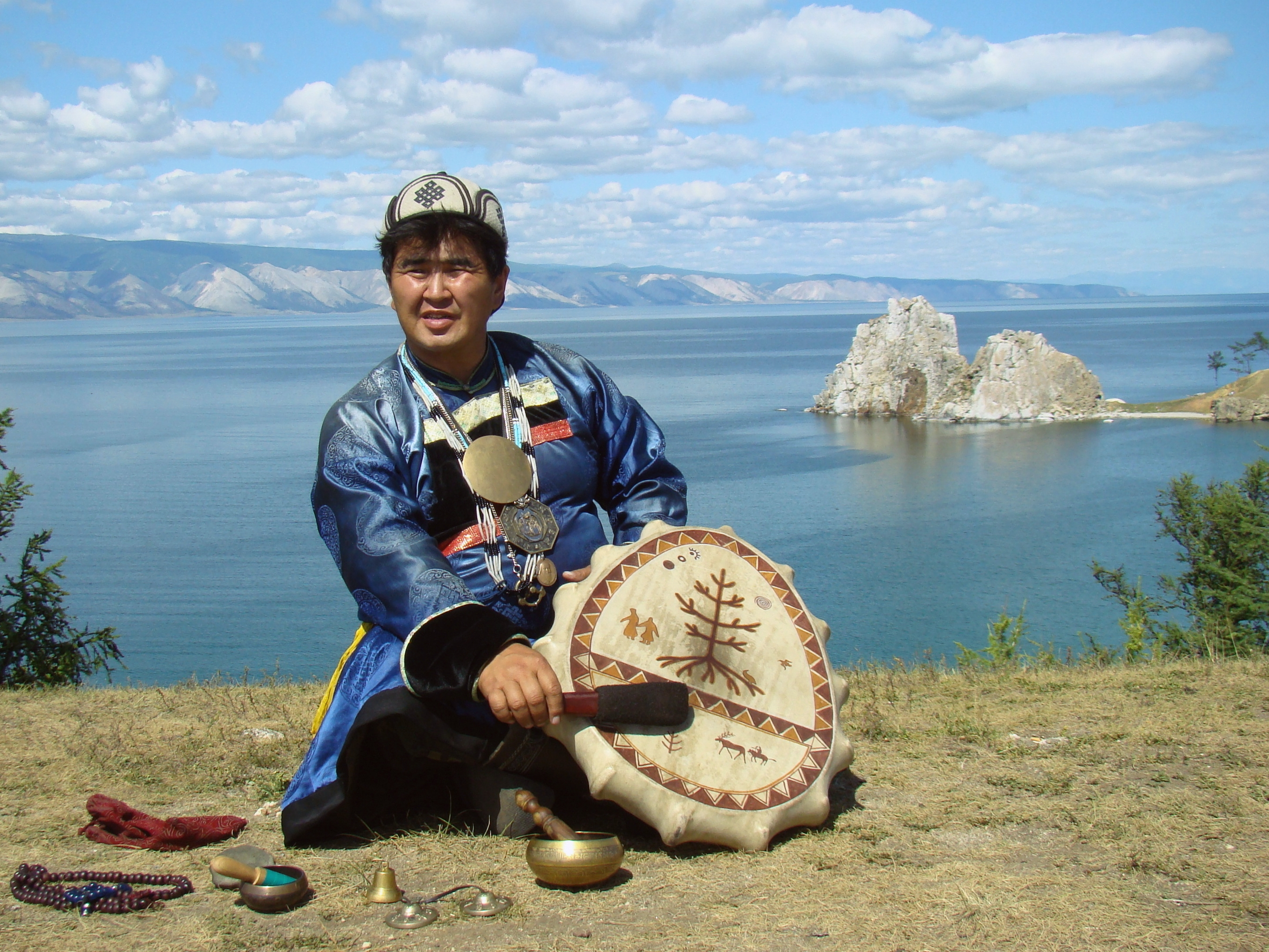
A Buryat shaman on Olkhon Island

There are several settlements and five villages on the island: Yalga, Malomorets, Khuzhir, Kharantsy, and Ulan-Khushin. The village of Khuzhir is the administrative capital of Olkhon, designated as such in April 1987 when the Soviet government issued a comprehensive decree protecting Lake Baikal. Khuzhir is home to about 1,200 residents and boasts a museum of local nature and history.

== Economy ==
Most residents are fishermen, farmers, or cattle-ranchers. Due to an increasing number of tourists from all over the world, many residents work in this sector as well, and tourism has become an important part of the economy in Olkhon.

== Culture ==
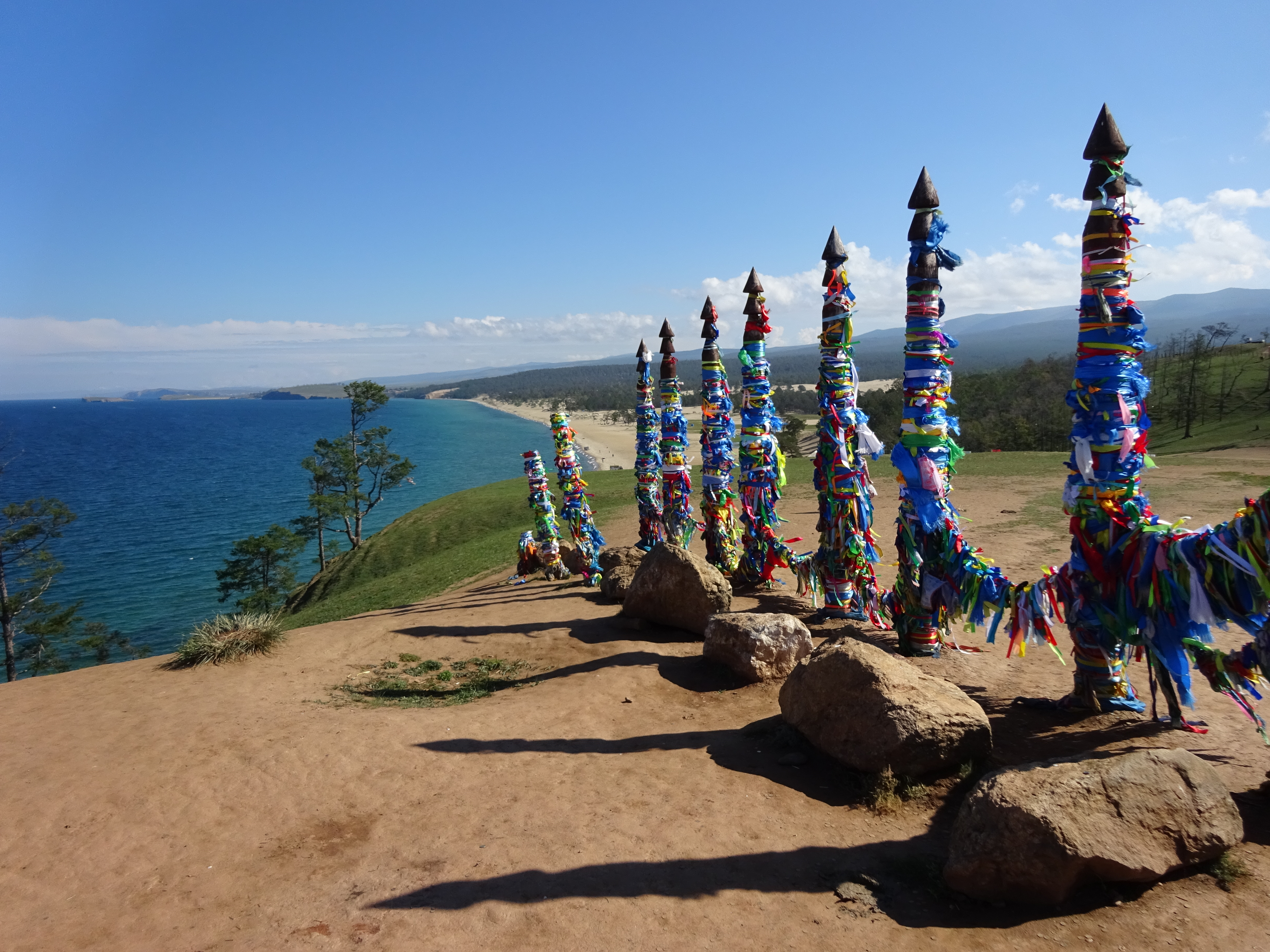
A series of serges at Shamanka on Olkhon Island

The indigenous Buryats, adherents of shamanism, believe the island to be a spiritual place; one of the groups of deities revered in Buryati yellow shamanism is called the oikony noyod, the "thirteen lords of Olkhon". On the western coast, close to Khuzhir, is Baikal's most famous landmark, the Shamanka, or Shaman's Rock. Natives believe that Burkhan, a modern religious cult figure of the Altai peoples, lives in the cave in this rock. Olkhon is considered a centre of Kurumchinskay culture of the 6th–10th centuries.

The museum at Olkhon, named after Revyakin, has exhibits on the nature and ethnography of the island, including pipe-smoking and a samovar collection.

== History ==
The island has a long history of human habitation. The original Indigenous peoples were the Buryats and the Yakuts.

Russian explorers first visited during the 17th century.

== Places of interest ==
Khuzhir is the main village on Olkhon Island and contains shops, and homestays.

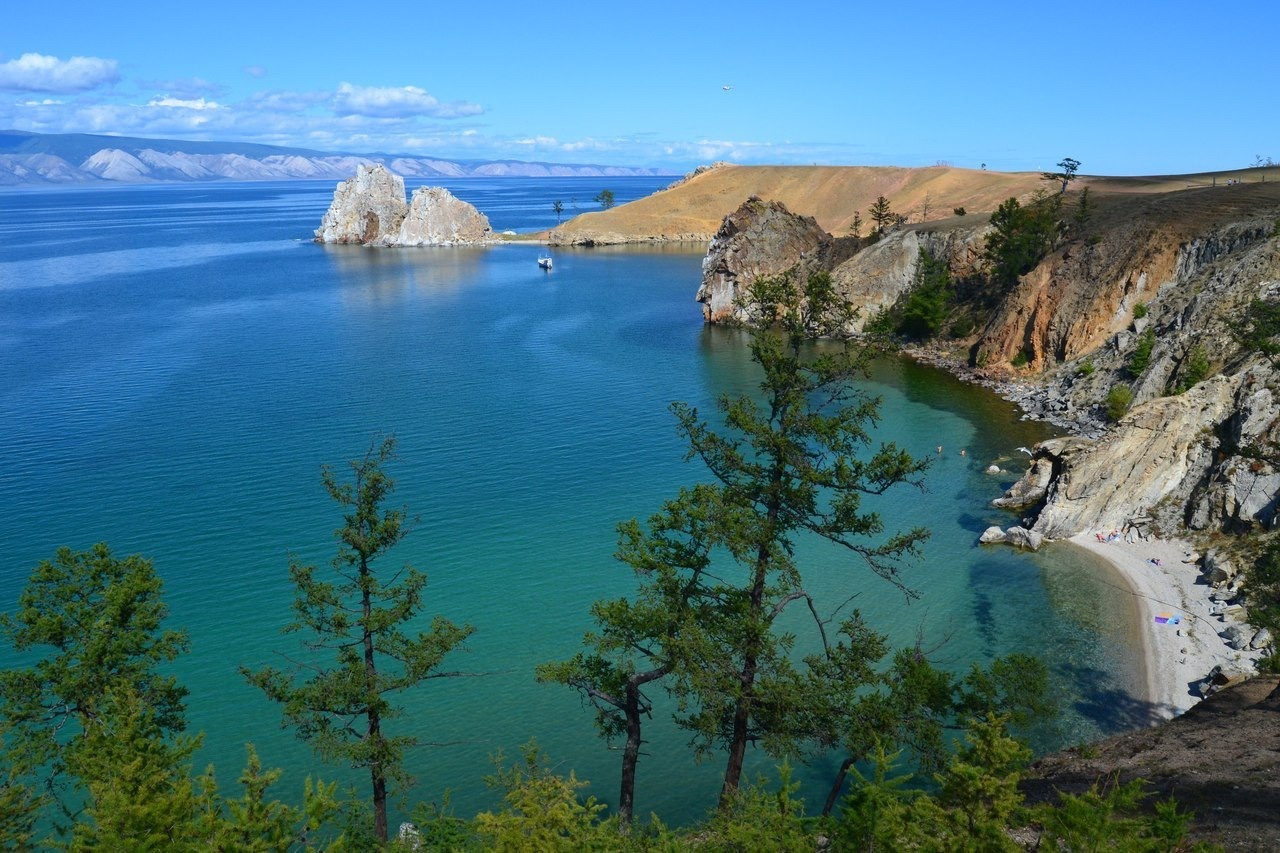
Coast of Olkhon Island

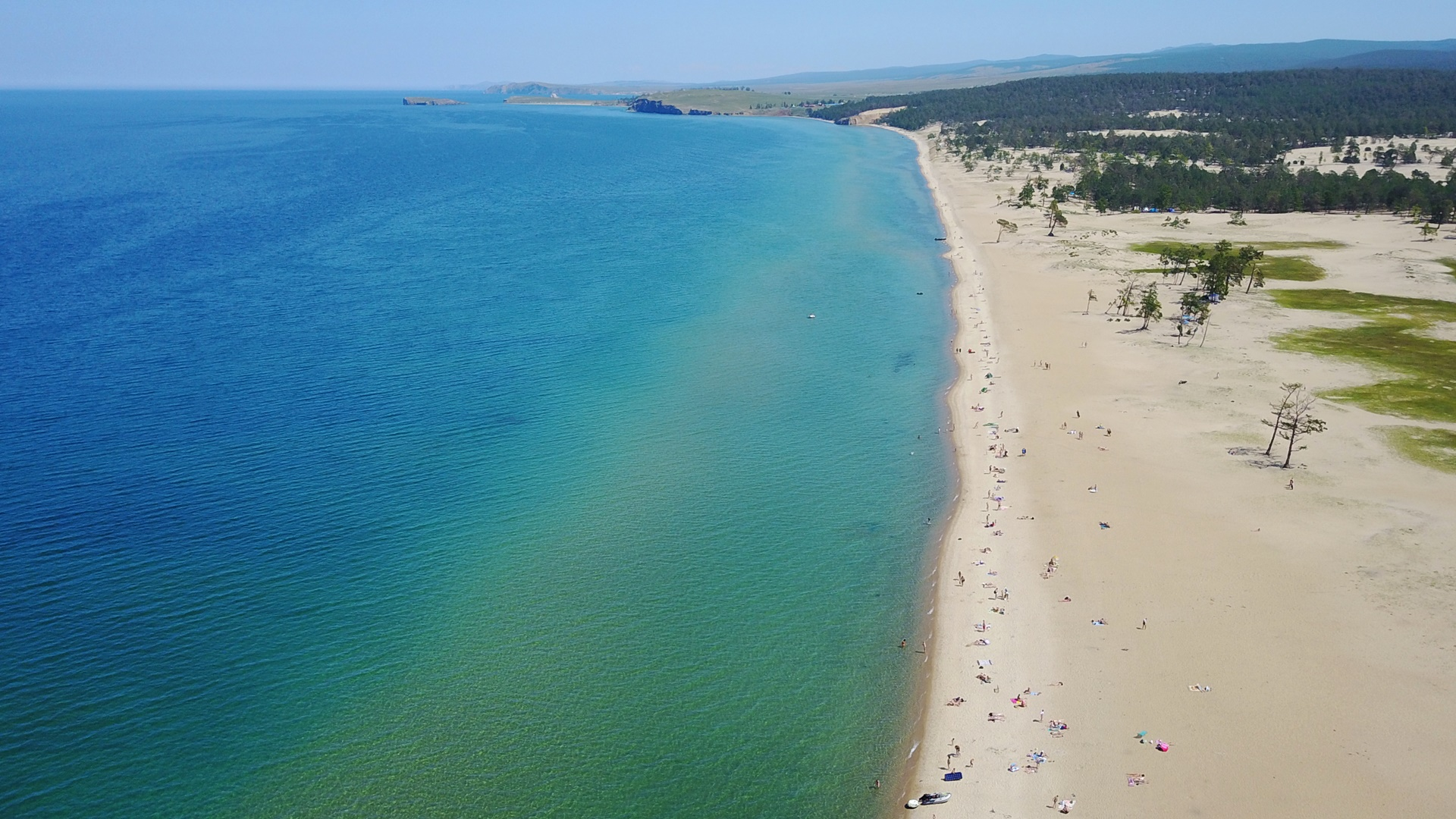
Beach north of Khuzhir

The National History Museum of Revyakin N. M in Khuzhir contains collections of historical items linked to the life and culture of the people of Olkhon from Neolithic times to the present day. Here, visitors can see various items such as stone arrowheads, badges of Mongolian soldiers, and materials used in cremation rituals, and can learn about life on this island of political exiles in the Soviet era, as well as the unique flora and fauna that can only be found on Olkhon Island. The Revyakin Museum was originally named after a famous geologist, paleontologist, geographer and writer of science fiction, Obruchev. However, it was later named after its founder, and a teacher of geography, N. M. Revyakin.

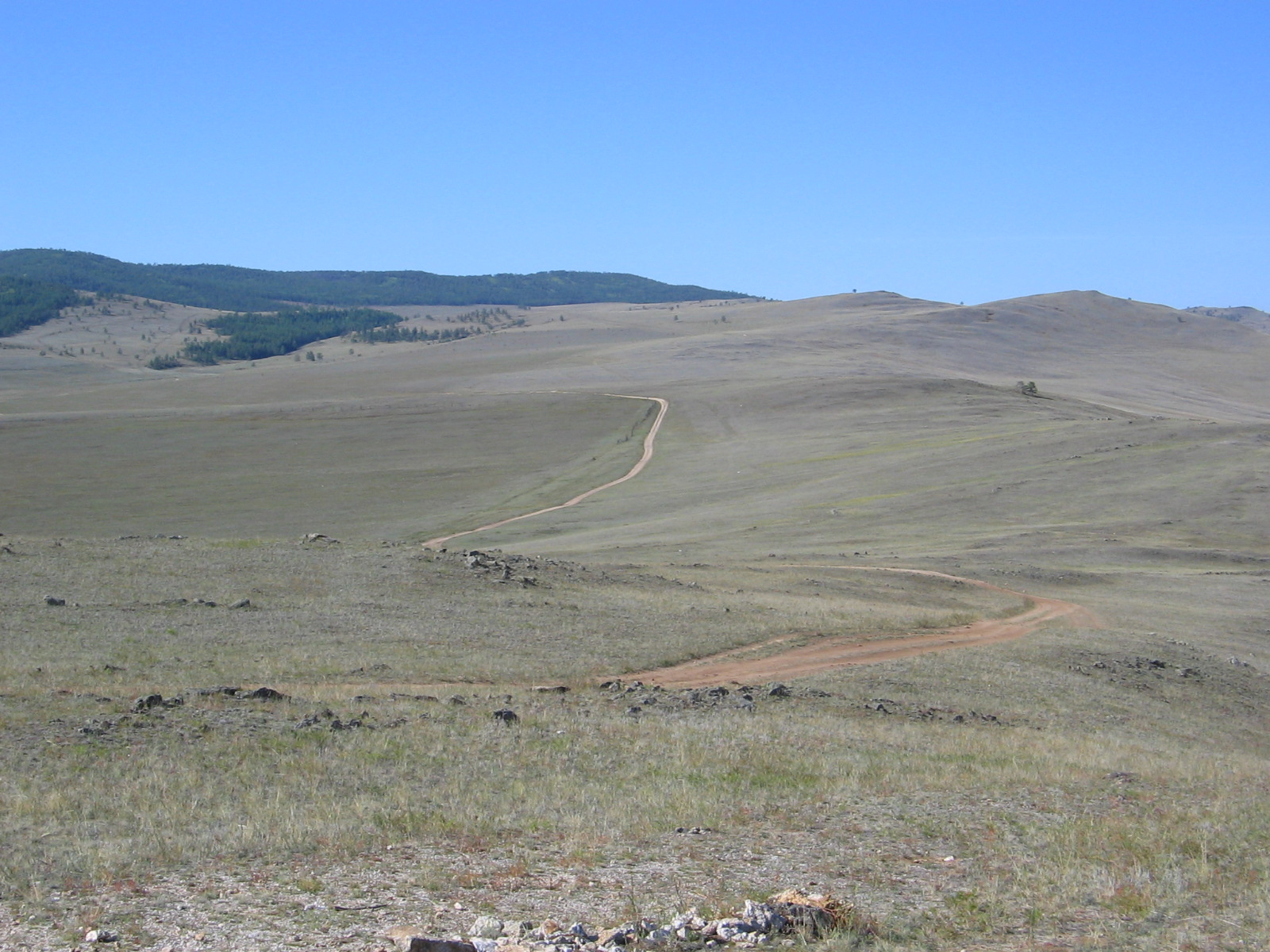
Semi-desert landscape on Olkhon Island

Peschanaya Village is an abandoned settlement famous for its picturesque sand dunes and the unique appearance of the trees found here – stilted trees with their roots exposed above the sand. The constant winds that blow from the sea towards land move the sand away from the shore and form high sand hills, which are called "moving sands", as these sand dunes constantly change location depending on the direction of the wind. This strong wind has also resulted in the exposure of roots of trees near the shore, giving the trees the appearance of a standing person, thus earning them the name "walking trees". Furthermore, there used to be a gulag fish factory here where prisoners worked during Soviet times. However, after Stalin's death, these prisoners were released, and the factory has been abandoned since the 1950s.

Three Brothers Rock, or Sagaan-Khushun Cape, is one of Baikal's natural monuments and another popular tourist sightseeing spot. It is easily recognised as three big rocks standing in a row overlooking Lake Baikal. According to an old Buryatian legend, there once lived three brothers on Olkhon Island whose father had supernatural powers. Once, their father turned them into eagles but only on the condition that they would not eat dead meat. The brothers were extremely happy with their newly gained freedom as eagles and decided to fly around the island after promising not to eat dead meat. However, when they were flying around the island, they became hungry and found a dead animal. Despite their promises to their father, they ate this dead animal. When their father learned about it, he was furious and turned them into the three rocks that we see today.

Khoboy Cape is the most northern point of Olkhon island. The name comes from an old Buryat word meaning "fang" because of its shape, a vertically oriented marble rock, appearing much like a fang.

The Cape of Khargoy is famous for its remains of an ancient Kurykan's stone wall. The wall is probably one of the best preserved ancient structures of the island and is composed of large stones without the use of any binding materials. The wall is about 185 m (607 ft) in length, and in some parts, its height can be as tall as 1.5–2 m (4.9–6.6 ft). The Kurykan Wall at Cape Khorgoy was first discovered and described in 1879 by geologist Jan Czerski.

== Ecological concerns ==
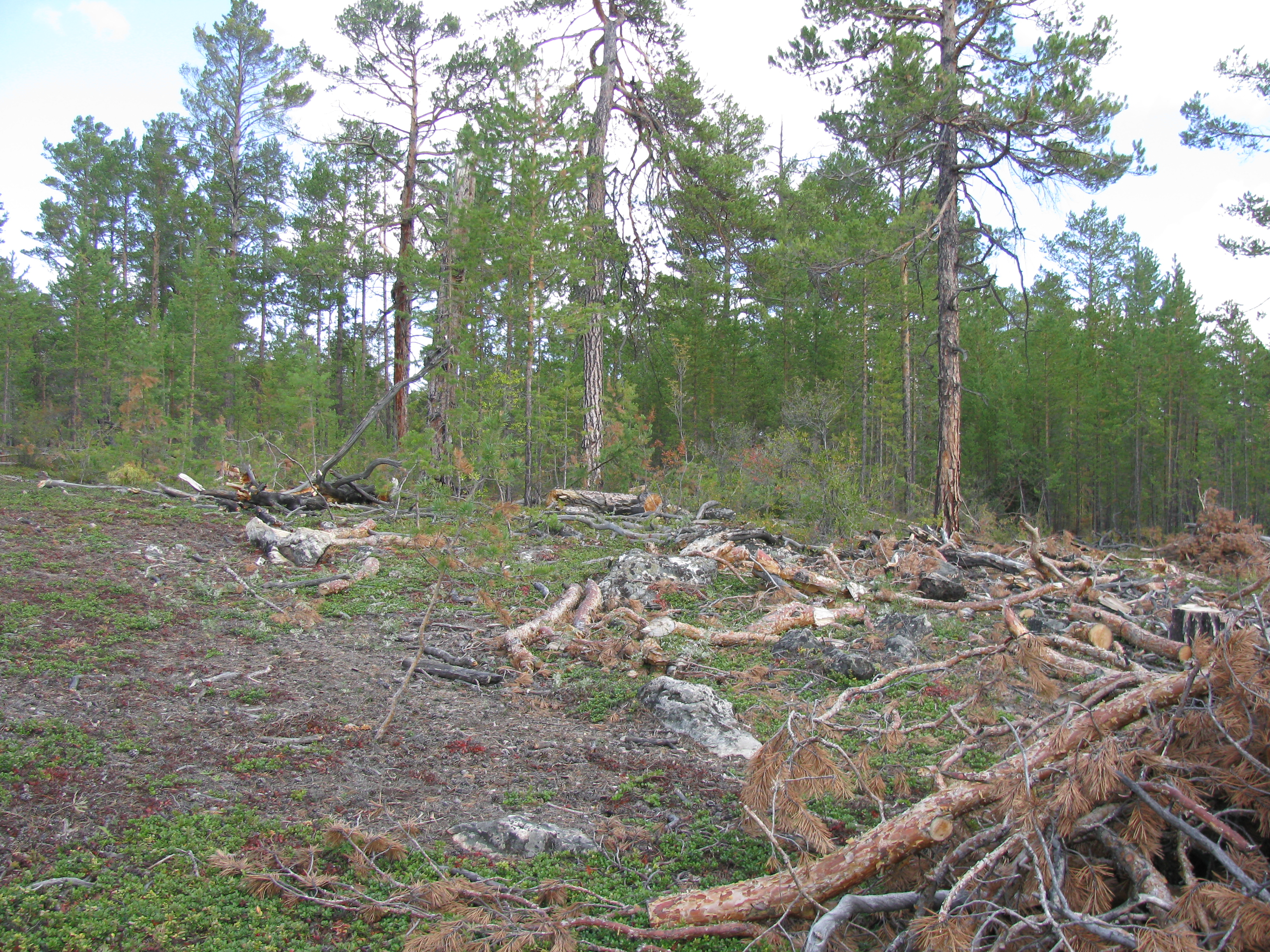
Piece of woodland after deforestation

One of the most important ecological problems of Olkhon Island is the disposal of household waste. At present, the waste is disposed of in large piles in woods near the village of Khuzhir. The dump is unenclosed, and the tipping process is uncontrolled. Moreover, with recent increases in tourism on the island, new sources of hard rubbish have begun to appear.

Another ecological concern affecting the island is the illegal felling of timber by local inhabitants. A complicated net of forestry roads in the areas adjacent to Khuzhir leads to woodland areas on the mountain slopes. Timber is brought out of the forest at night time, and the deforestation is taking its toll on the area.

== See also ==
- List of islands of Russia
