= Olkhonsky District =

Olkhonsky District Ольхонский район (Russian)
- District
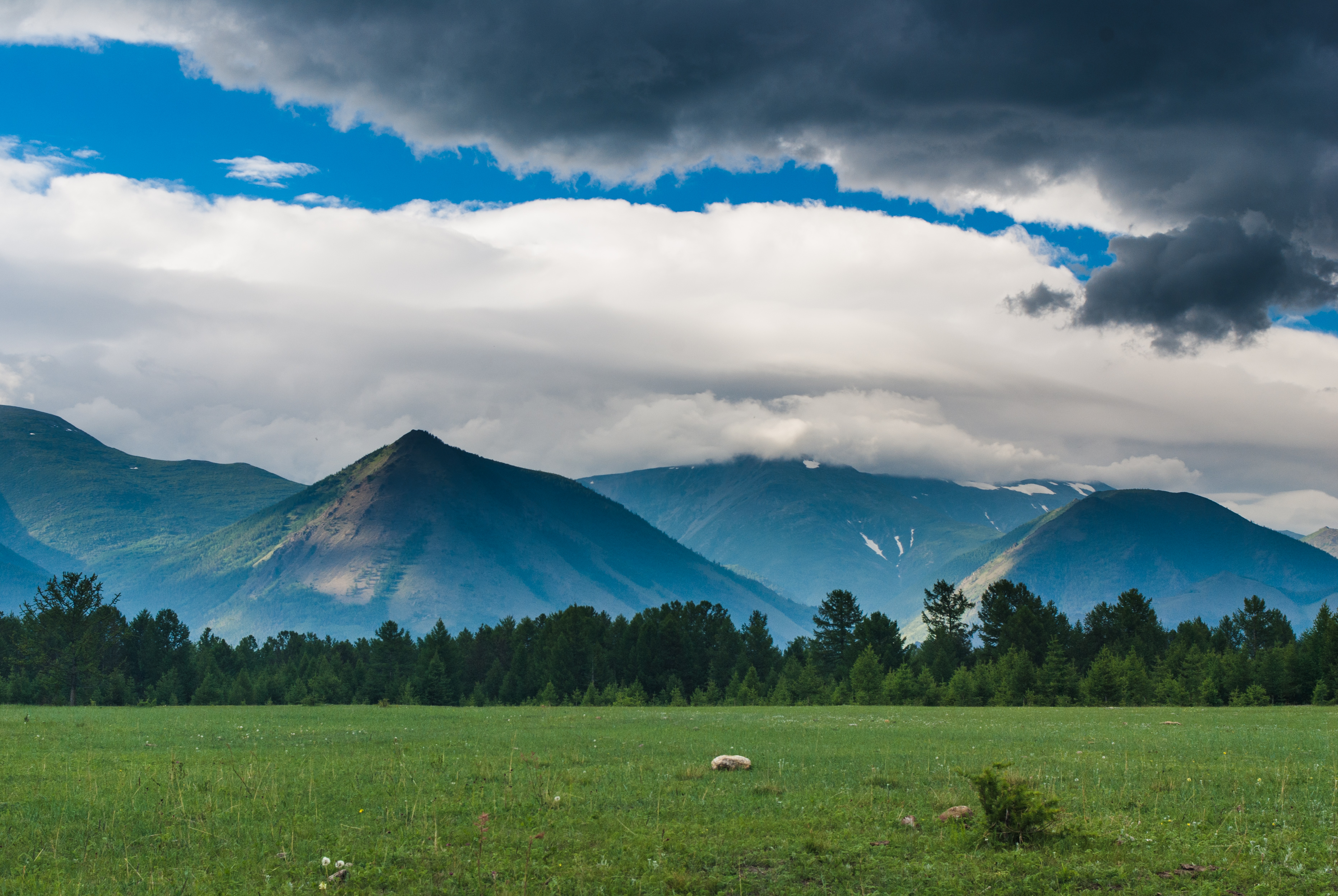
- Onguren-Kocherikova, Olkhonsky District

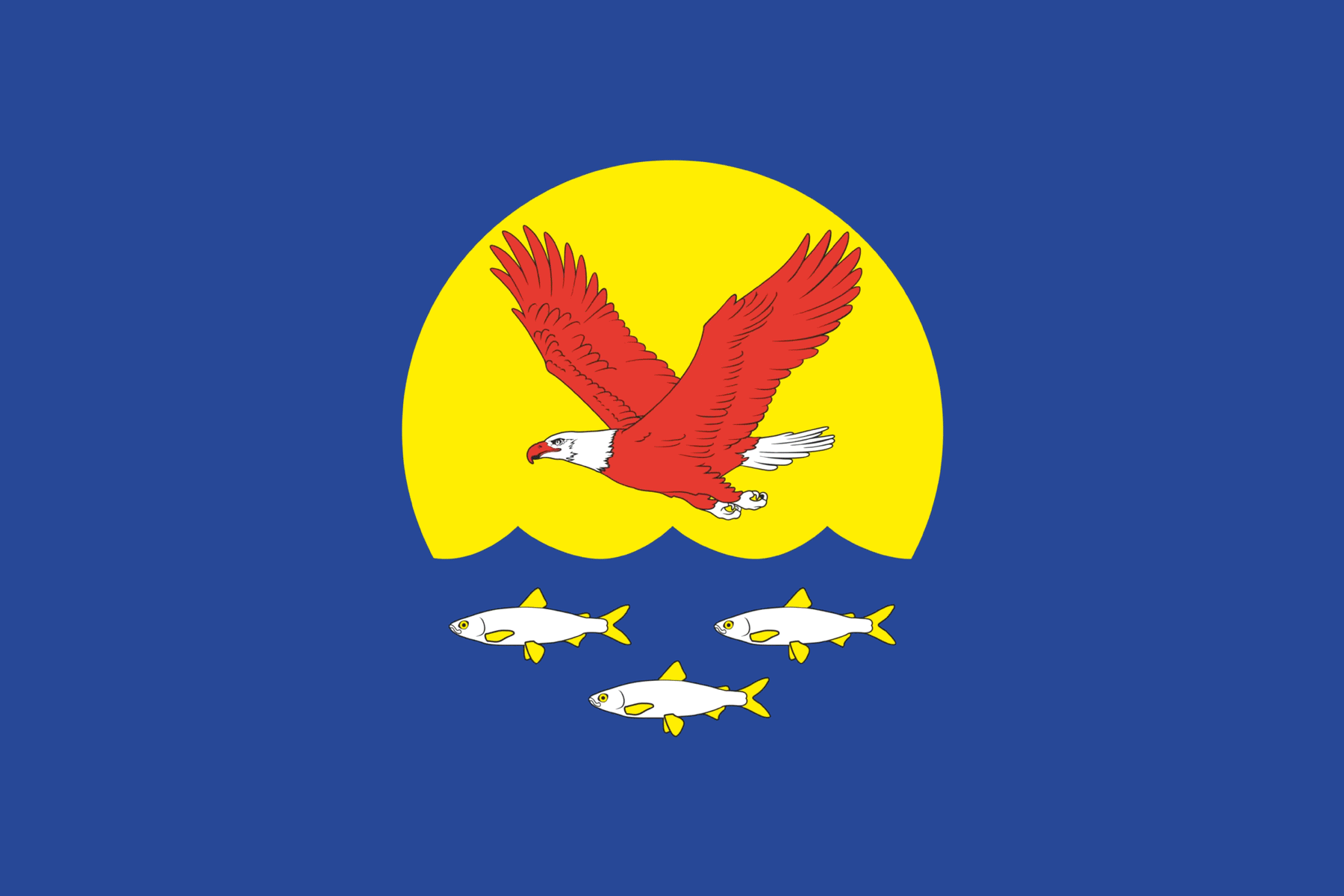
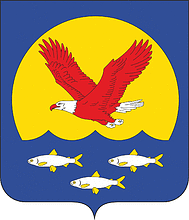
- Flag Coat of arms
- Location of Olkhonsky District (#21) in southeast Irkutsk Oblast
- Coordinates: 52°47′N 106°23′E
- Country: Russia
- Federal subject: Irkutsk Oblast
- Established: 1935
- Administrative center: Yelantsy

Area
  - Total: 15,900 km^{2} (6,100 sq mi)

Population (2010 Census)
  - Total: 9,446
  - Density: 0.594/km^{2} (1.54/sq mi)
  - Urban: 13.2%
  - Rural: 86.8%

Administrative structure
  - Inhabited localities: 41 rural localities

Municipal structure
  - Municipally incorporated as: Olkhonsky Municipal District
  - Municipal divisions: 0 urban settlements, 6 rural settlements
- Time zone: UTC+8 (MSK+5)
- OKTMO ID: 25630000
- Website: http://xn----8sbwecbgqgbbhxj1dvg.xn--p1ai/

Olkhonsky District (Russian: Ольхонский райо́н) is an administrative district, one of the thirty-three in Irkutsk Oblast, Russia. Municipally, it is incorporated as Olkhonsky Municipal District. The area of the district is 15,900 square kilometers (6,100 sq mi). Its administrative center is the rural locality (a selo) of Yelantsy. Population: 9,446 (2010 census); 8,955 (2002 Census); 8,735 (1989 Soviet census). The population of Yelantsy accounts for 42.4% of the district's total population.
