= Azerbaijan Time =

Time zone

- Time zone

UTC offset
- AZT: UTC+04:00

Current time
- 17:34, 21 September 2026 UTC+04:00 [refresh]

Observance of DST
- DST is not observed in this time zone.

Time in Europe: Light Blue / Western European Time / Greenwich Mean Time (UTC); Blue / Western European Time / Greenwich Mean Time (UTC); Blue / Western European Summer Time / British Summer Time / Irish Standard Time (UTC+1); Red / Central European Time (UTC+1); Red / Central European Summer Time (UTC+2); Yellow / Eastern European Time / Kaliningrad Time (UTC+2); Ochre / Eastern European Time (UTC+2); Ochre / Eastern European Summer Time (UTC+3); Green / Moscow Time / Turkey Time (UTC+3); Turquoise / Armenia Time / Azerbaijan Time / Georgia Time / Samara Time (UTC+4); ▉▉▉▉ Pale hues: Standard time observed all year ▉▉▉ Dark hues: Daylight saving time

Azerbaijan Time (Note: Azerbaijani: Azərbaycanda vaxt – lit. 'Time in Azerbaijan') (AZT) is the standard time zone in Azerbaijan, four hours ahead of UTC (UTC+04:00). The daylight saving time adjustment, Azerbaijan Summer Time (Note: Azerbaijani: Azərbaycanda yay vaxtı – lit. 'Summer time in Azerbaijan') (AZST), was one hour ahead at UTC+05:00; it was introduced in 1997 and discontinued in March 2016.

Azerbaijan Time is the same as Samara Time (Russia), United Arab Emirates Standard Time, Georgia Time, Armenia Time and Seychelles Time.

== History ==
Azerbaijan, formerly the Azerbaijan Soviet Socialist Republic (Azerbaijan SSR), adhered to timekeeping regulations instituted by the Soviet Union. In 1930, the Council of People’s Commissars of the USSR implemented "Decree Time," which mandated a one-hour advancement of standard time across the entire Soviet territory. This move had been done to utilize maximum daylight and improve efficiency in energy. As a constituent republic, the Azerbaijan SSR observed this adjustment, effectively operating one hour ahead of its natural time zone.

In 1981, the Soviet Union introduced daylight saving time (DST), applying an additional one-hour shift during the summer period. This positioned Azerbaijan two hours ahead of its original standard time during the DST period. The regime of DST was standardized across the USSR to maintain consistency in administrative and economic procedures. Decree Time policy was gradually abolished towards the late 1980s. By 1991, just prior to the breakup of the Soviet Union, Decree Time was technically eliminated, and Azerbaijan fell back to regular time.

Since its independence in 1991, Azerbaijan retained daylight saving time. In March 2016, however, the Republic of Azerbaijan Cabinet of Ministers announced the permanent abolition of DST due to medical, psychological, and technological considerations. The country has remained on Azerbaijan Time (AZT).

== IANA time zone database ==
The IANA time zone database contains one zone for Azerbaijan in the file zone.tab, named Asia/Baku.
