= Sakhyurta =

Sakhyurta Сахюрта
- Village
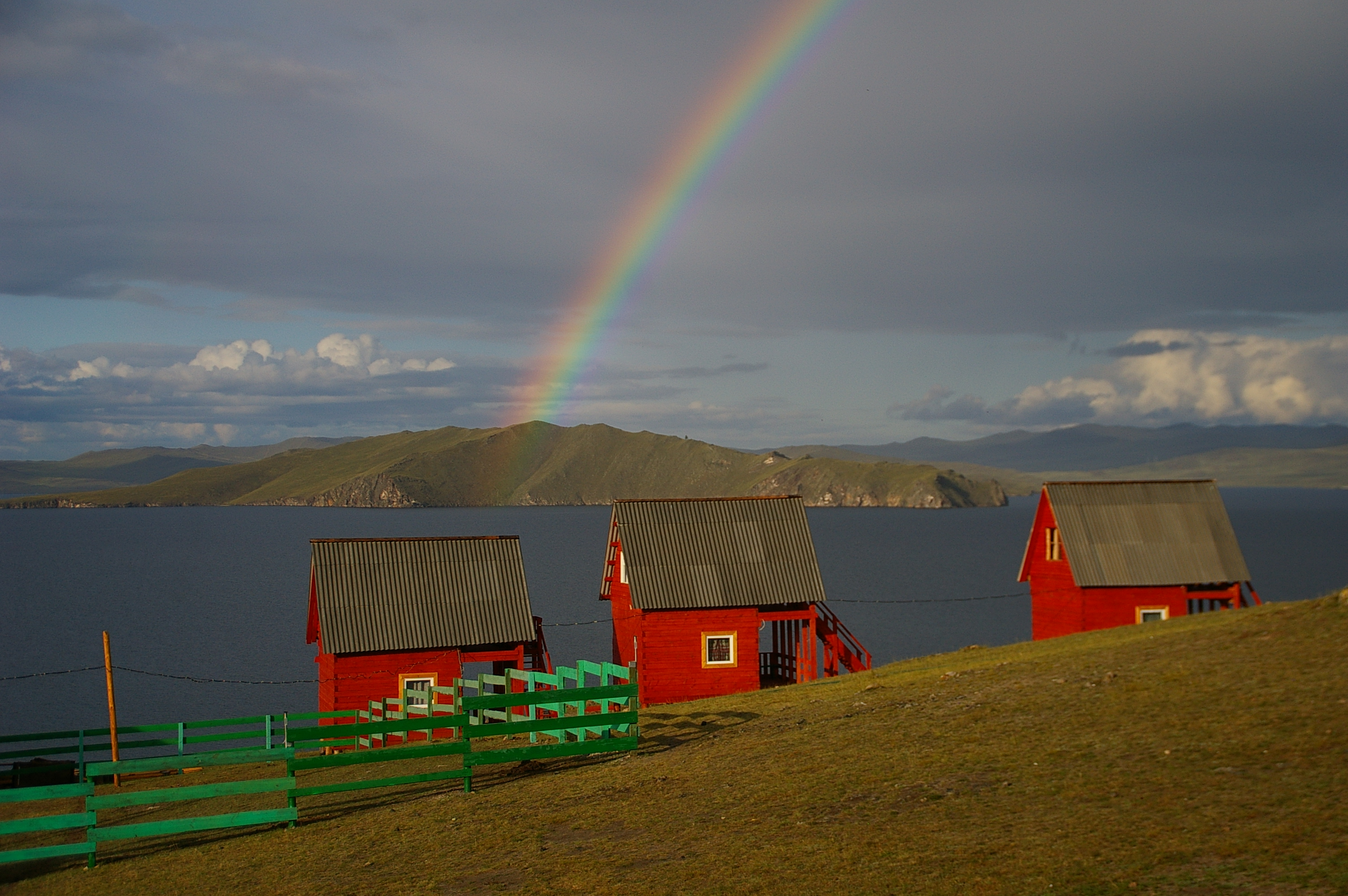

- Location within Russia
- Coordinates: 53°00′59″N 106°53′12″E
- Country: Russia
- Federal subject: Irkutsk Region
- Administrative district: Olkhonsky District
- Municipal unit: Shara-Togotskiy

Population (2010)
  - Total: 224
  - Ethnicities: Russians Buryats
- Time zone: UTC+08 (IRKT)
- Postal code: 674464
- Dialing code: +7 39558

Sakhyurta (from Buryat: сахюур - whitish) is a village in the Olkhonsky District of Irkutsk region of Russia, a part of the Shara-Togotskiy municipal unit. Located on the western shore of Lake Baikal, in 46 km northeast from the district center — village Elantsy and in 12 km southeast from the municipal unit centre — village Shara-Togot. Population: 224 (2010 census);

In the village the river station Malomorskaya (MRS) is located, which provides a ferry service to Olkhon Island. The ferry operates, as a rule, from May, 15 to December, 15. In the winter time the ice-road across Olkhon Gate strait is opened.

== Gallery ==
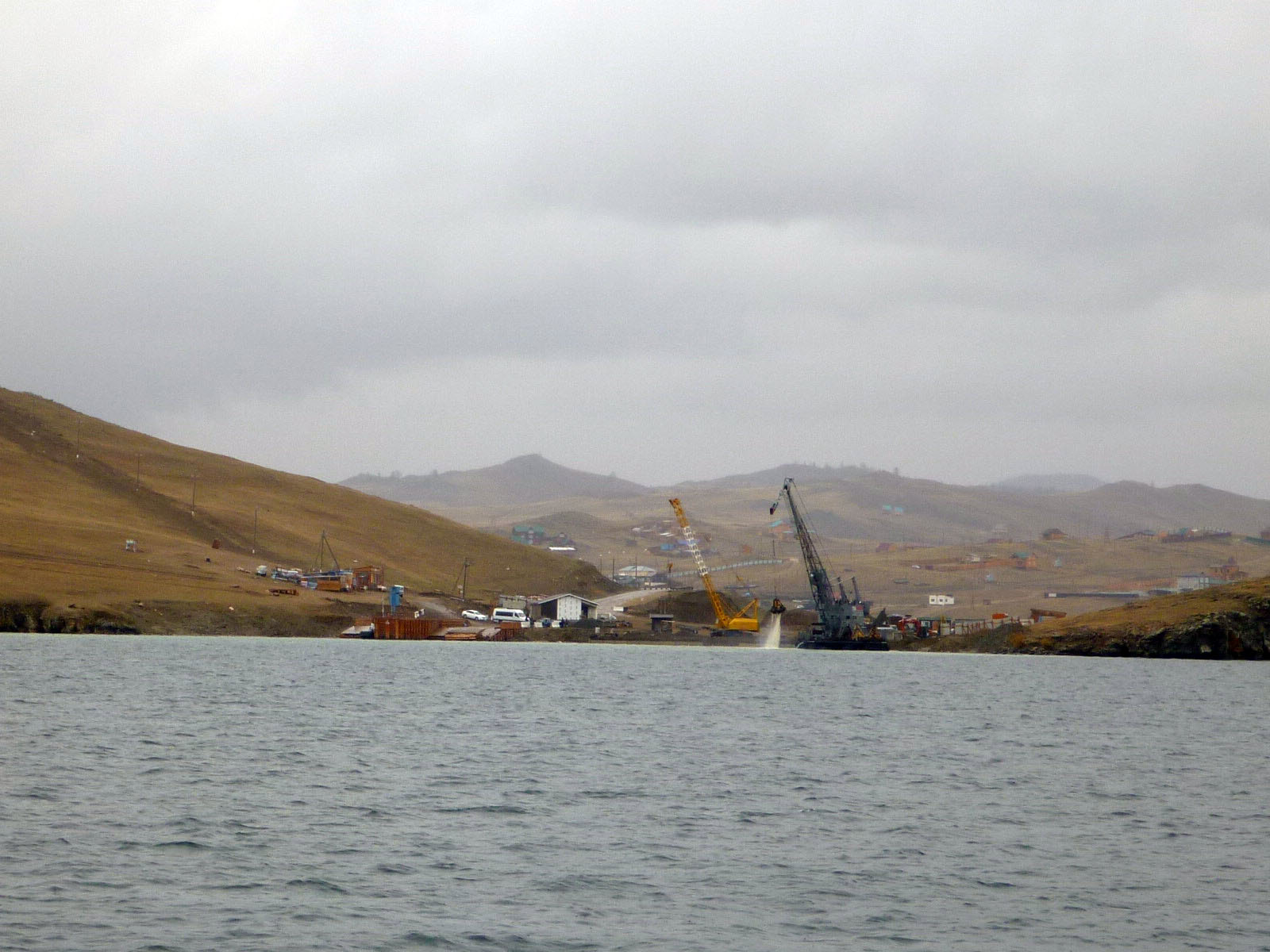
View of Malomorskaya river station from Olkhon Gate strait

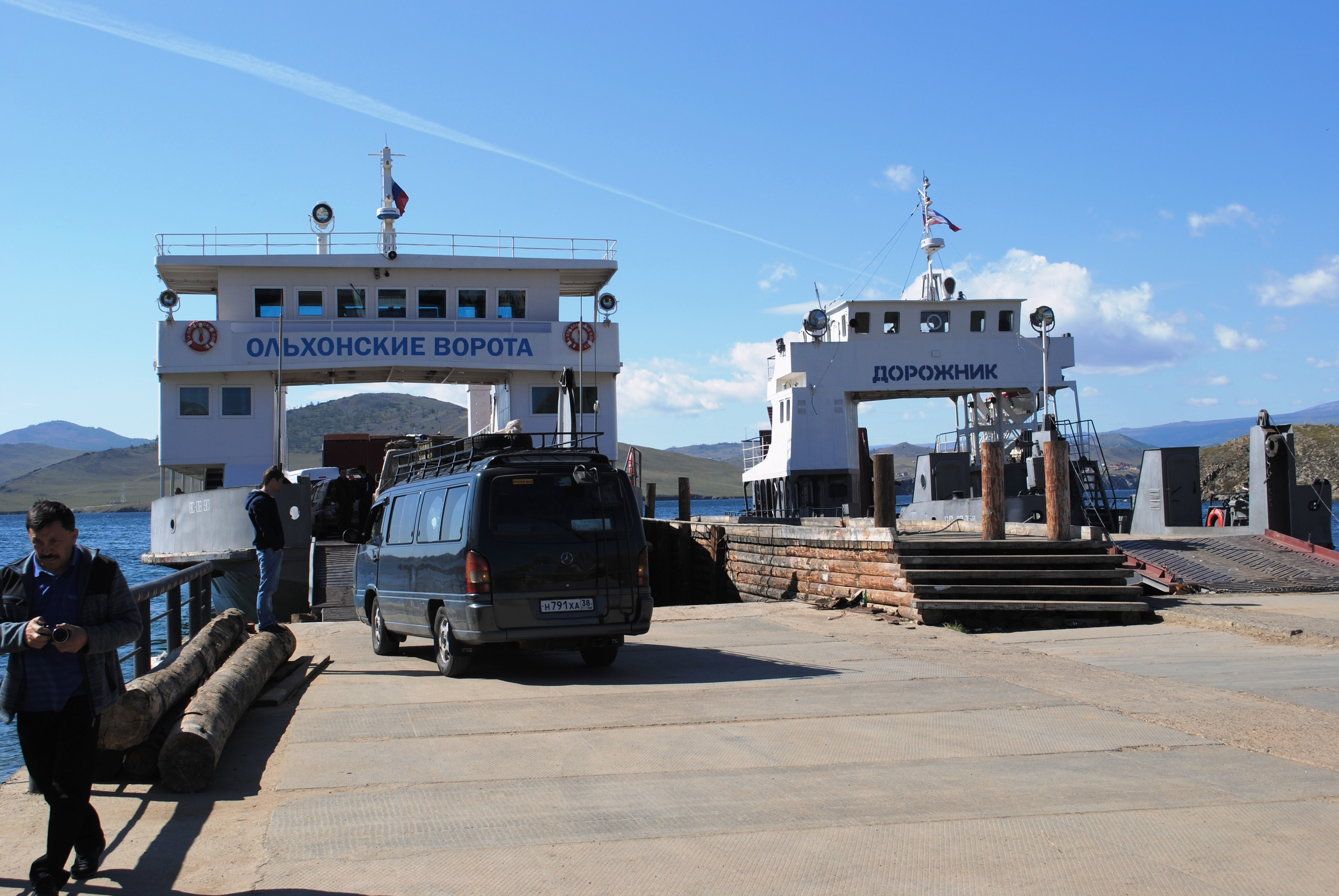
Ferry "MRS – Olkhon Island"

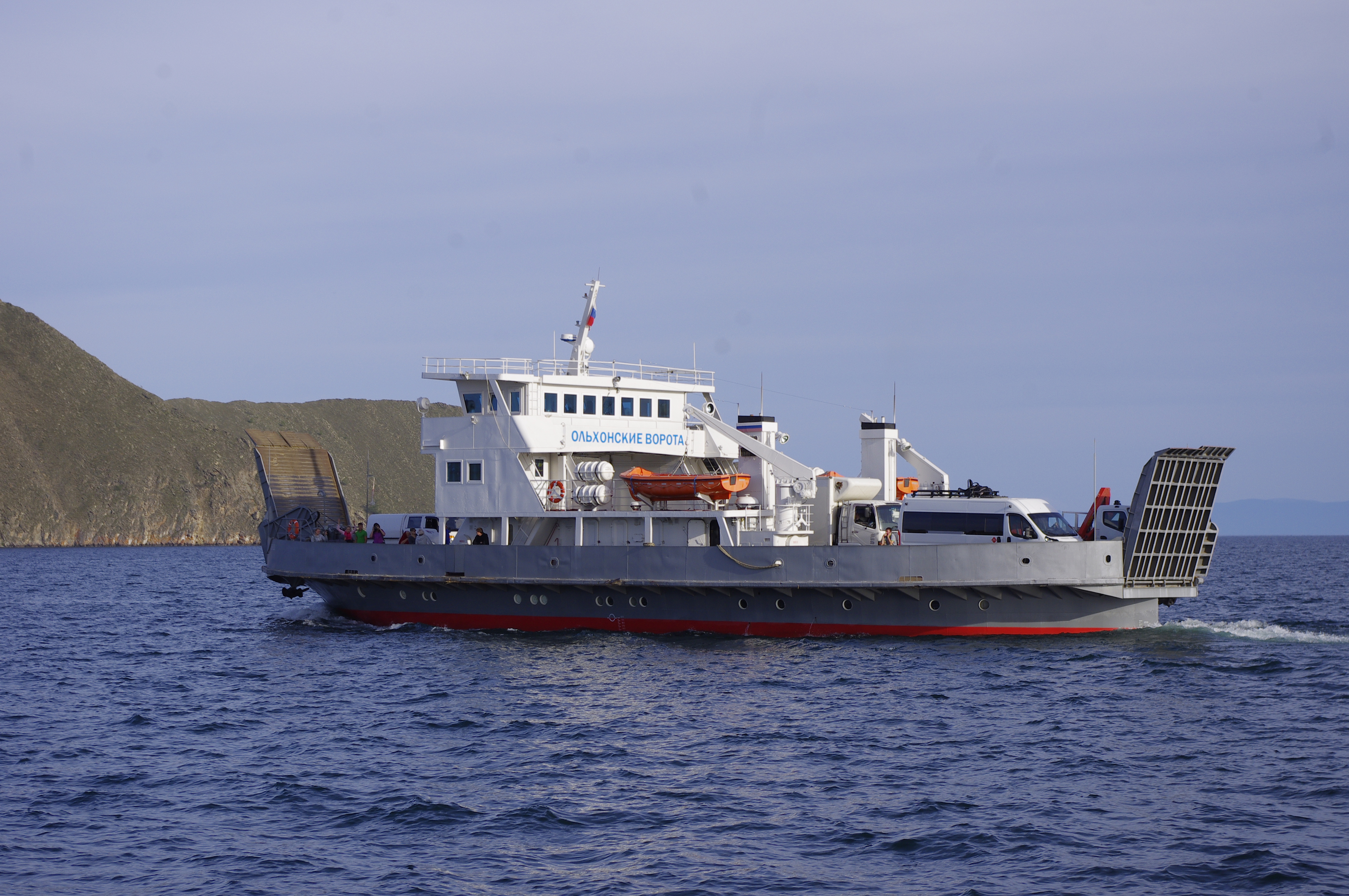
The ferry travels to Olkhon Island

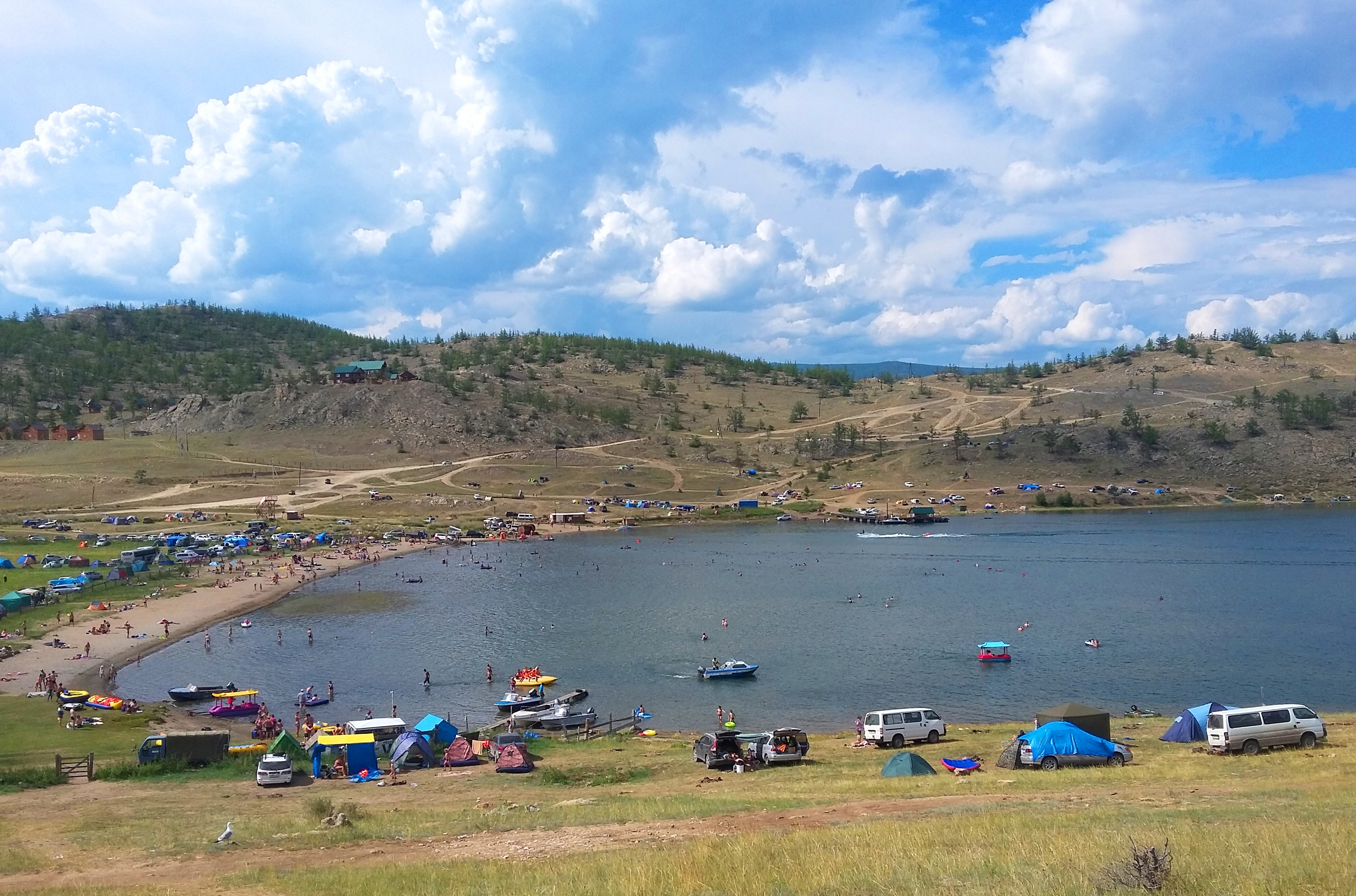
Bazarnaia Bay

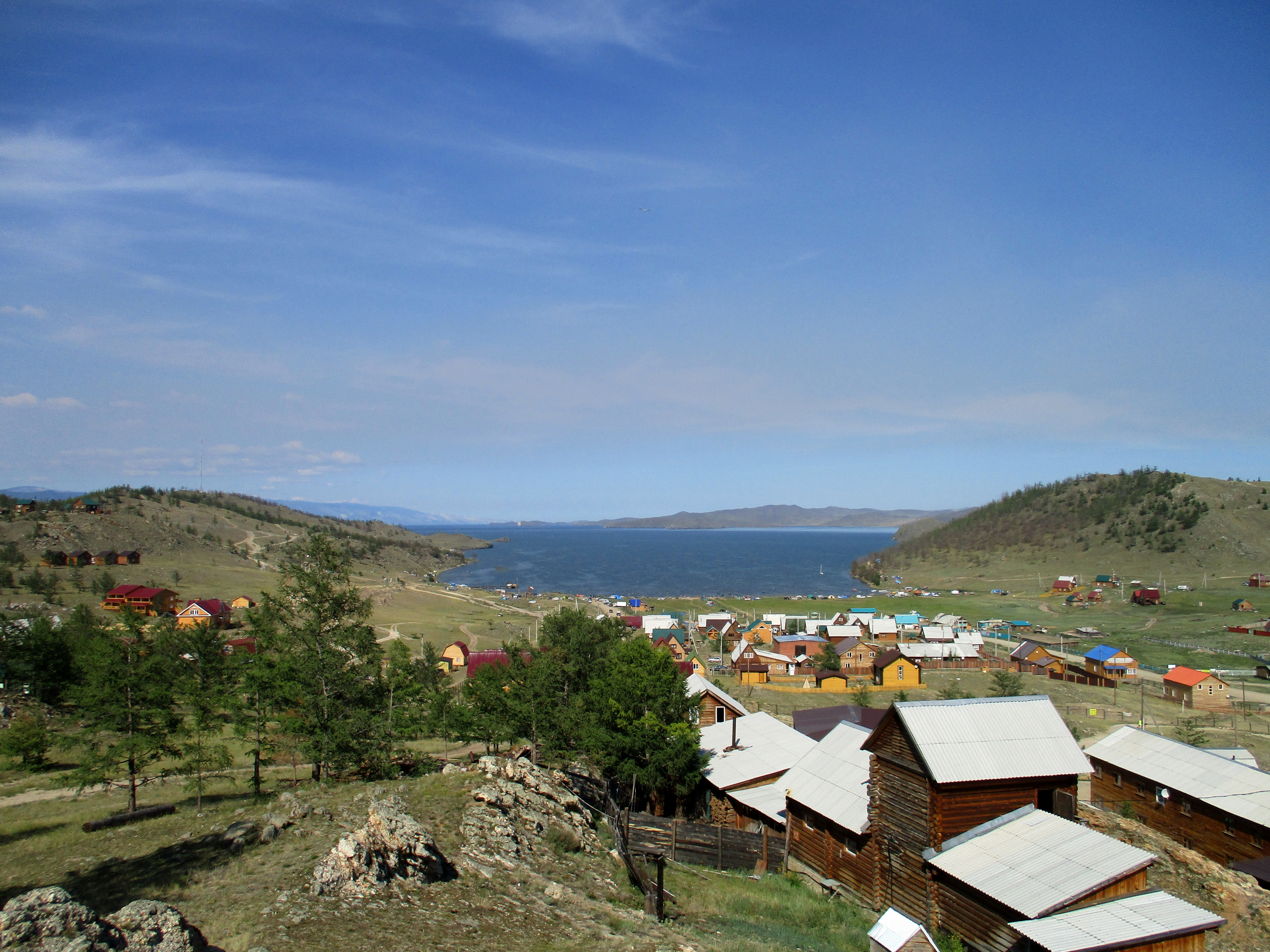
View on Sakhyurta and Bazarnaia Bay
