= Moscow Time =

Time zone in western Russia (UTC+3)

- Time zone

UTC offset
- MSK: UTC+03:00

Current time
- 20:58, 10 July 2026 MSK [refresh]

Observance of DST
- DST is not observed in this time zone.

Time in Russia: KALT / Kaliningrad Time / UTC+2 / (MSK−1); MSK / Moscow Time / UTC+3 / (MSK±0); SAMT / Samara Time / UTC+4 / (MSK+1); YEKT / Yekaterinburg Time / UTC+5 / (MSK+2); OMST / Omsk Time / UTC+6 / (MSK+3); KRAT / Krasnoyarsk Time / UTC+7 / (MSK+4); IRKT / Irkutsk Time / UTC+8 / (MSK+5); YAKT / Yakutsk Time / UTC+9 / (MSK+6); VLAT / Vladivostok Time / UTC+10 / (MSK+7); MAGT / Magadan Time / UTC+11 / (MSK+8); PETT / Kamchatka Time / UTC+12 / (MSK+9)

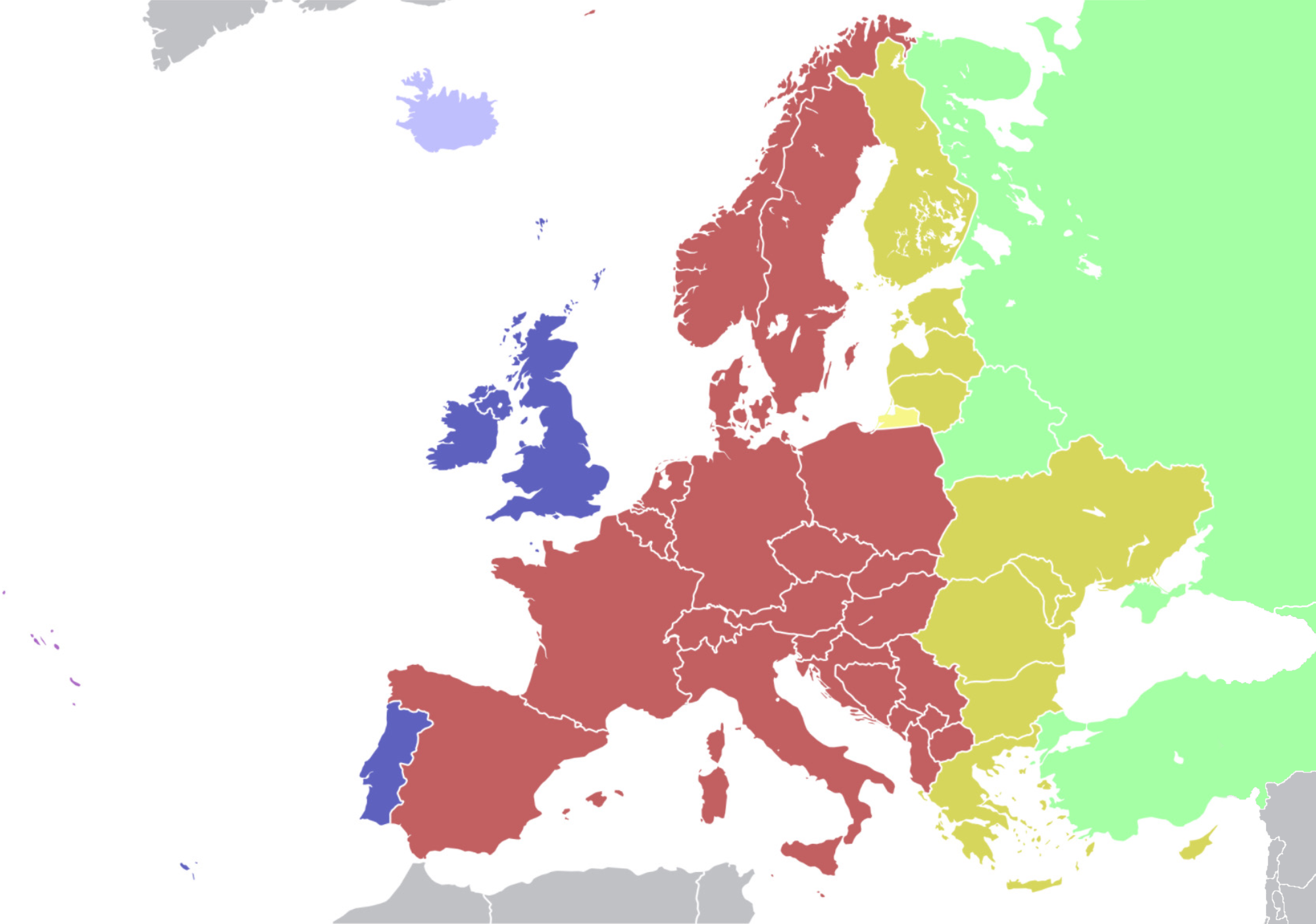
Time in Europe: Light Blue / Western European Time / Greenwich Mean Time (UTC); Blue / Western European Time / Greenwich Mean Time (UTC); Blue / Western European Summer Time / British Summer Time / Irish Standard Time (UTC+1); Red / Central European Time (UTC+1); Red / Central European Summer Time (UTC+2); Yellow / Eastern European Time / Kaliningrad Time (UTC+2); Ochre / Eastern European Time (UTC+2); Ochre / Eastern European Summer Time (UTC+3); Green / Moscow Time / Türkiye Time (UTC+3); Turquoise / Armenia Time / Azerbaijan Time / Georgia Time / Samara Time (UTC+4); Pink / Kazakhstan Time / Yekaterinburg Time (UTC+5); ▉▉▉▉ Pale hues: Standard time observed all year ▉▉▉ Dark hues: Daylight saving time

Moscow Time (Russian: Московское время (МСК), romanized: Moskovskoye vremya, MSK) is the time zone for the city of Moscow, Russia, and most of western Russia, including Saint Petersburg. It is the second-westernmost of the eleven time zones of Russia, after the non-contiguous Kaliningrad enclave. It has been set to UTC+03:00 without DST since 26 October 2014; before that date it had been set to UTC+04:00 year-round on 27 March 2011.

Moscow Time is used to schedule trains (until 1 August 2018), ships, etc. throughout Russia, but air transport in Russia is scheduled using local time. Since 1 August 2018, Russian railways switched to using local time. Time in Russia is often announced throughout the country's other time zones on radio stations as Moscow Time, which is also registered in telegrams, etc. Descriptions of time zones in Russia are often based on Moscow Time rather than UTC; for example, Yakutsk (UTC+09:00) is said to be MSK+6 in Russia.

== History ==
Until the October Revolution, the official time in Moscow corresponded to GMT+02:30:17 (according to the longitude of the Astronomical Observatory of Moscow State University). In 1919 the Council of People's Commissars of the RSFSR introduced the system of time zones in the country, and Moscow was assigned to the second administrative time zone, equal to GMT+02:00. Other zones east of the 37.5° meridian to Arkhangelsk, Vologda, Yaroslavl, Kostroma, Ivanovo, Vladimir, Ryazan, Tula, Lipetsk, Voronezh and Rostov-on-Don were also included in the second belt.

In accordance with the 16 June 1930 Decree of the Council of People's Commissars, the Decree Time was introduced by adding one hour to the time in each time zone of the USSR, so that Moscow Time became three hours ahead of Universal Time.

Until 2011, during the winter, between the last Sunday of October and the last Sunday of March, Moscow Standard Time (MSK, МСК) was three hours ahead of UTC, or UTC+03:00. In the summer, Moscow Time shifted forward an additional hour ahead of Moscow Standard Time to become Moscow Summer Time (MSD), making it UTC+04:00.

In 2011, the Russian government proclaimed that daylight saving time would be observed all year round, thus effectively displacing standard time — claiming health concerns attributed to the annual shift to-and-fro DST. On 27 March 2011, Muscovites set their clocks forward for a final time, effectively observing MSD, or UTC+04:00, permanently.

On 29 March 2014, after the annexation of Crimea by the Russian Federation, the Republic of Crimea and the city of Sevastopol — two federal subjects established by Russia on the Crimean Peninsula — switched their time to MSK on 30 March 2014 (from UTC+02:00 with DST to UTC+04:00 with permanent DST).

On 1 July 2014, the State Duma passed a bill partially repealing the 2011 change, removing permanent DST and putting Moscow Time from 26 October 2014 on permanent UTC+03:00 and thus back to standard time.

== Usage ==
Most of the European part of Russia (west of the Ural Mountains) uses Moscow Time. Kaliningrad Oblast uses Kaliningrad Time (UTC+02:00). Samara Oblast and Udmurtia use Samara time (UTC+04:00) and Perm Krai, Bashkortostan and Orenburg Oblast use Yekaterinburg time (UTC+05:00). Since 2014, Moscow Time has been observed in Crimea after it was annexed and in Russian-occupied territories of Ukraine, including after their declared annexation in 2022.

=== Past usage ===
Moscow Time was also formerly used in European parts of the then-USSR:

- Estonia, in 1940–1941 and 1944–1989
- Latvia, in 1940–1941 and 1944–1989
- Lithuania, in 1940–1941 and 1944–1989
- Kaliningrad Oblast (Russia), in 1946–1989
- Moldova, in 1944–1990
- Ukraine, in 1930–1941 and 1943–1990
- Samara Oblast (Russia), in 1989–1991 and again from 2010 to 2011
- Belarus, in 1930–1941, 1944-1991 and again from 2014
- Crimea, in 1930–1941, 1944–1990, 1994-1997 and again from 2014

Moscow Summer Time (UTC+04:00) was first applied in 1981 and was used:

- until 1989 in Estonia, Kaliningrad Oblast, Latvia and Lithuania
- until 1990 in Moldova and Ukraine
- until 1991 in Belarus
- between 1989 and 1991 and in 2010 in Samara Oblast.

In 1922–1930 and 1991–1992, Moscow observed Eastern European Time (UTC+02:00). Daylight saving time (UTC+03:00) was observed in the summer of 1991, and the city and region reverted to UTC+03:00 by the summer of 1992.

The time in Moscow has been as follows (the following list of DST usage may not be accurate):

From 1 January 1880	UTC+02:30:17
From 3 July 1916	UTC+02:31:19
From 1 July 1917	UTC+02:31:19 with DST
From 1 July 1919	UTC+03:00 with DST
From 16 August 1919	UTC+03:00
From 14 February 1921	UTC+03:00 with DST
From 1 October 1921	UTC+03:00
From 1 October 1922	UTC+02:00 (EET)
From 21 June 1930	UTC+03:00
From 1 April 1981	UTC+03:00 with DST
From 31 March 1991	UTC+02:00 (EET) with DST
From 19 January 1992	UTC+03:00 with DST
From 27 March 2011	UTC+04:00
From 26 October 2014	UTC+03:00

== Anomalies ==
Since political, in addition to purely geographical, criteria are used in drawing time zones, they do not precisely adhere to meridian lines. The "purely geographical" MSK (UTC+03:00) time zone would consist of the band between meridians 37°30' E and 52°30' E. However, there are European locales that despite lying in an area with a "physical" UTC+03:00 time, are in another time zone; likewise, there are European areas that have gone for UTC+03:00, even though their "physical" time zone is different. Following is a list of such anomalies:

=== Areas located outside UTC+03:00 longitudes using Moscow Time (UTC+03:00) time ===
Areas west of 37°30' E ("physical" UTC+02:00) that use UTC+03:00

- The entirety of Belarus with 23°10' E as the westernmost point where UTC+3 has been used since 2011, thus aligning with MSK since 2014 (see also Minsk Time)
- Western Russia, including Saint Petersburg, half of Moscow and Crimea

Areas between 52°30' E and 67°30' E ("physical" UTC+04:00) that use UTC+03:00

- Russia, including most of Franz Josef Land, Yuzhny Island, most of Severny Island with an exception to the very east, and some parts of the Russian mainland (Komi Republic, Nenets Autonomous Okrug, east of Kirov Oblast and Tatarstan)

Areas east of 67°30' E ("physical" UTC+05:00) that use UTC+03:00

- The very east of Severny Island in Russia with 69°2' E as the easternmost point where MSK is used

=== Areas located within UTC+03:00 longitudes (37°30' E – 52°30' E) using other time zones ===
Areas that use UTC+02:00

- Eastern parts of Ukraine

Areas that use UTC+04:00

- Georgia with an exception of Abkhazia and South Ossetia
- Armenia
- Azerbaijan
- The Russian Oblasts of Astrakhan, Samara, Saratov and Ulyanovsk with an exception to the very east
- Western half of the Russian Republic of Udmurtia

Areas that use UTC+05:00

- The western tip of Perm Krai in Russia, and the western parts of the Orenburg Oblast in Russia

== IANA time zone database ==
In the zone.tab of the IANA time zone database, the zones with the same current offset are:

c.c.	Coordinates	Timezone name	Comments	UTC offset	Notes
RU	+554521+0373704	Europe/Moscow	MSK+00 – Moscow area	+03:00	
RU	+4457+03406	Europe/Simferopol	Crimea	+03:00	Disputed - Reflects data in the TZDB.
RU	+5836+04939	Europe/Kirov	MSK+00 – Kirov	+03:00	
RU	+4844+04425	Europe/Volgograd	MSK+00 – Volgograd	+03:00	

== See also ==
- East Africa Time, also in UTC+03:00
- Time in Russia
