= Olkhon Gate =

Strait of Lake Baikal, Russia

Coordinates: 53°01′N 106°55′E

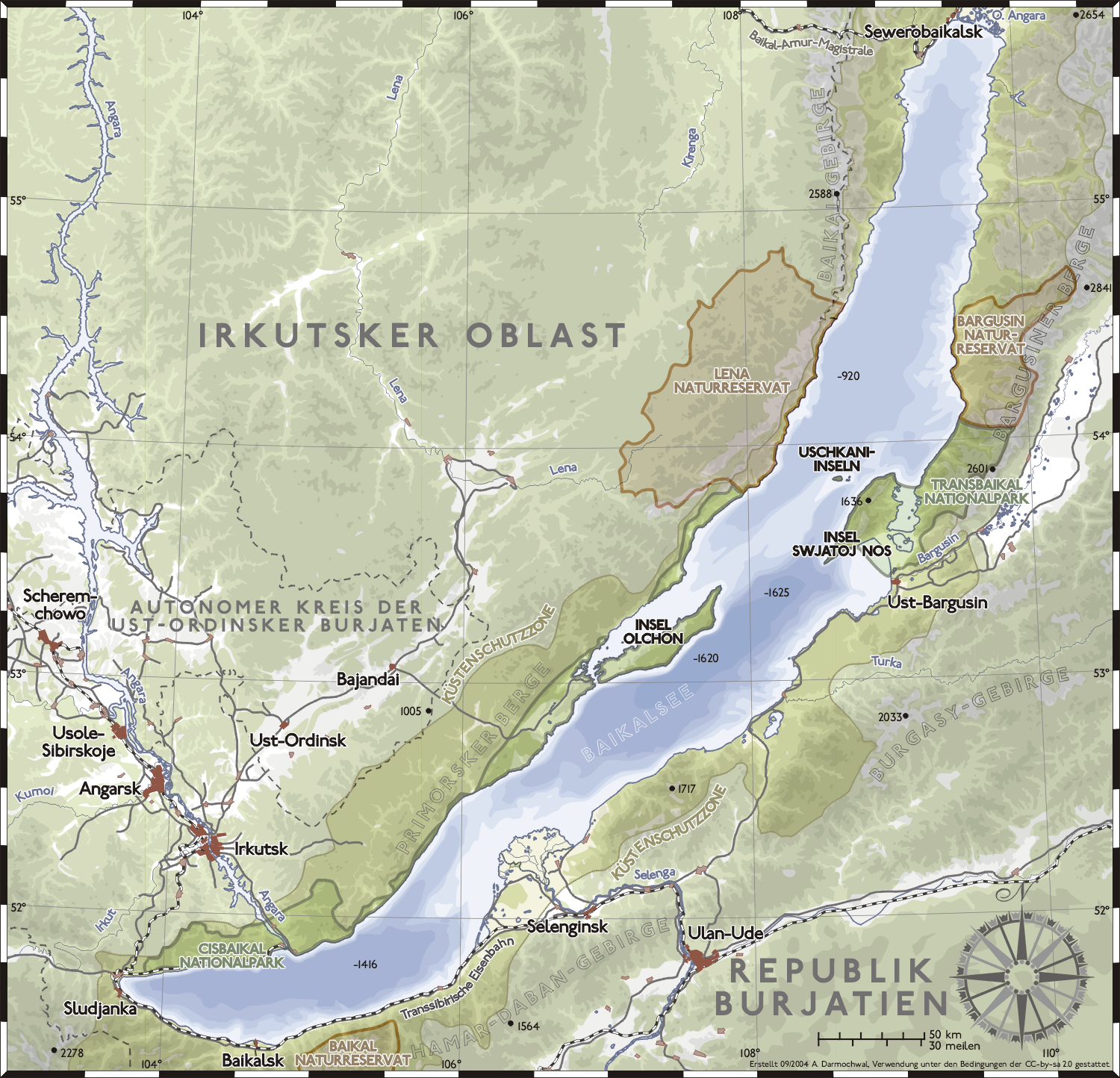
A map of Lake Baikal (Olkhon Gate in centre)

Olkhon Gate (Russian: Ольхонские Ворота, Olkhonskie Vorota) is a strait of Lake Baikal, Russia. It separates the south-west of Olkhon Island from the western shore of Baikal. In the north the strait opens out into the Maloe More strait, and to the south into the central open Baikal. Its length is about 8.3 km, width is 1.2 - 2.3 km. Average depth is 30 – 40 m, at the south of the strait the depth reaches 100 m. There is a rather strong current in the strait, and the waves can reach 5 m in height.

The banks of the strait are mostly steep and precipitous, the shoreline is a rugged with long narrow capes and bays.

To the north-north-west of the strait the valley of the Sarma River lies, the source of Sarma wind - the strongest wind of the Baikal.

In the middle part of the strait the ferry "Sakhyurta (MRS) — Olkhon Island" operates from 15 May to 15 December. In the winter time an ice-road is opened.

In 2005 a high-voltage underwater cable was laid at the bottom of the strait, providing Olkhon island with electricity.

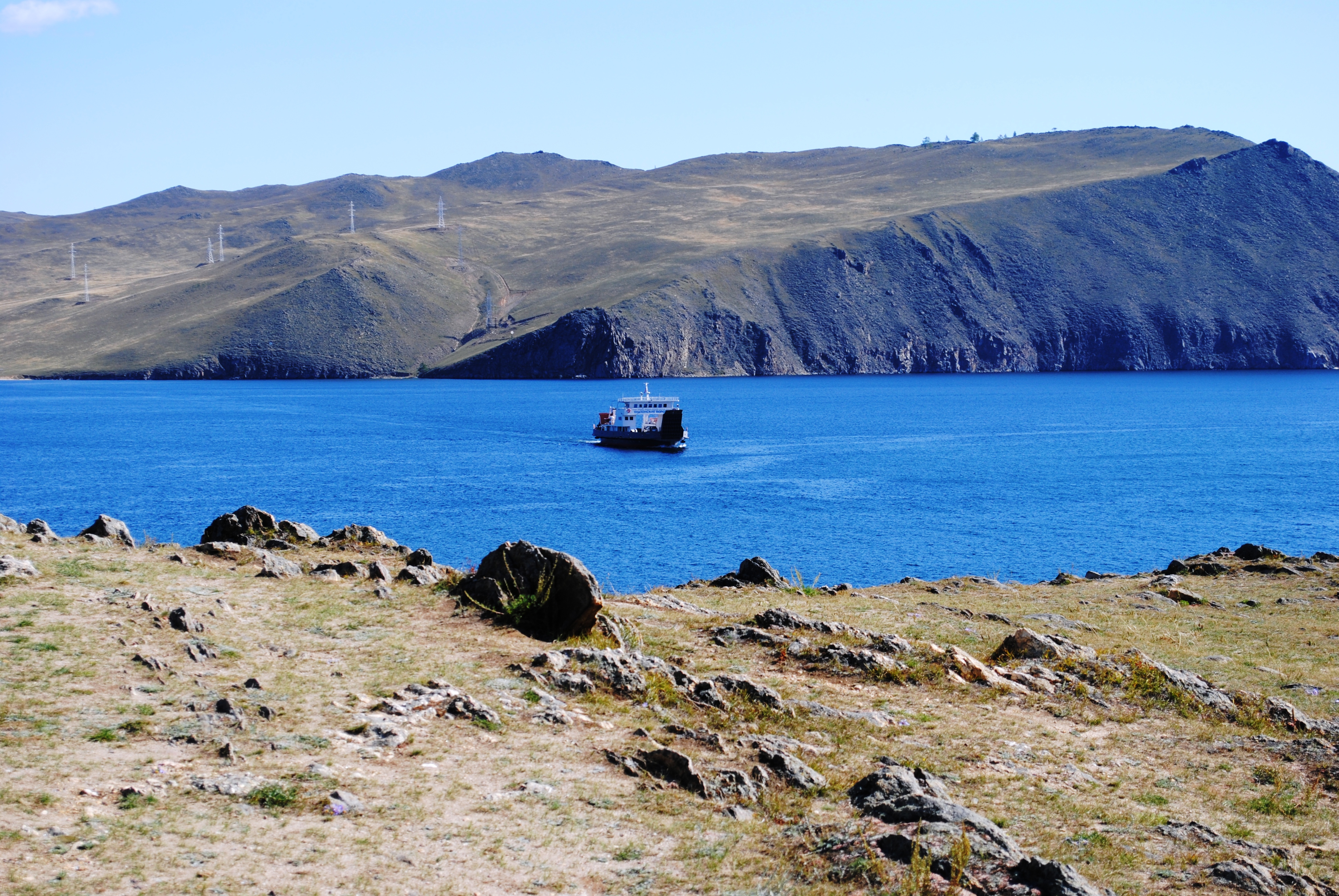
View of Olkhon Gate from the mainland

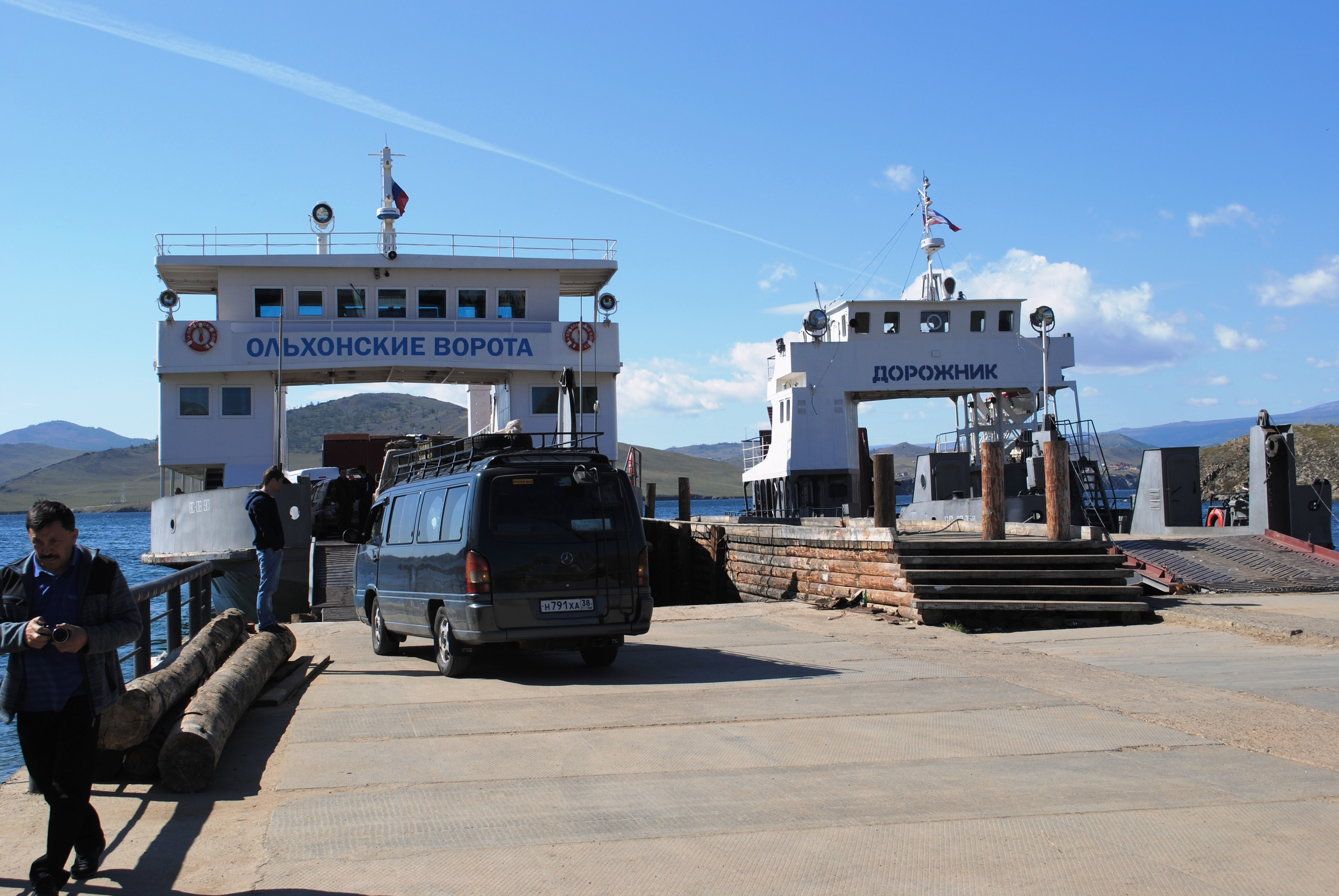
Ferry fleet of Olkhon Gate

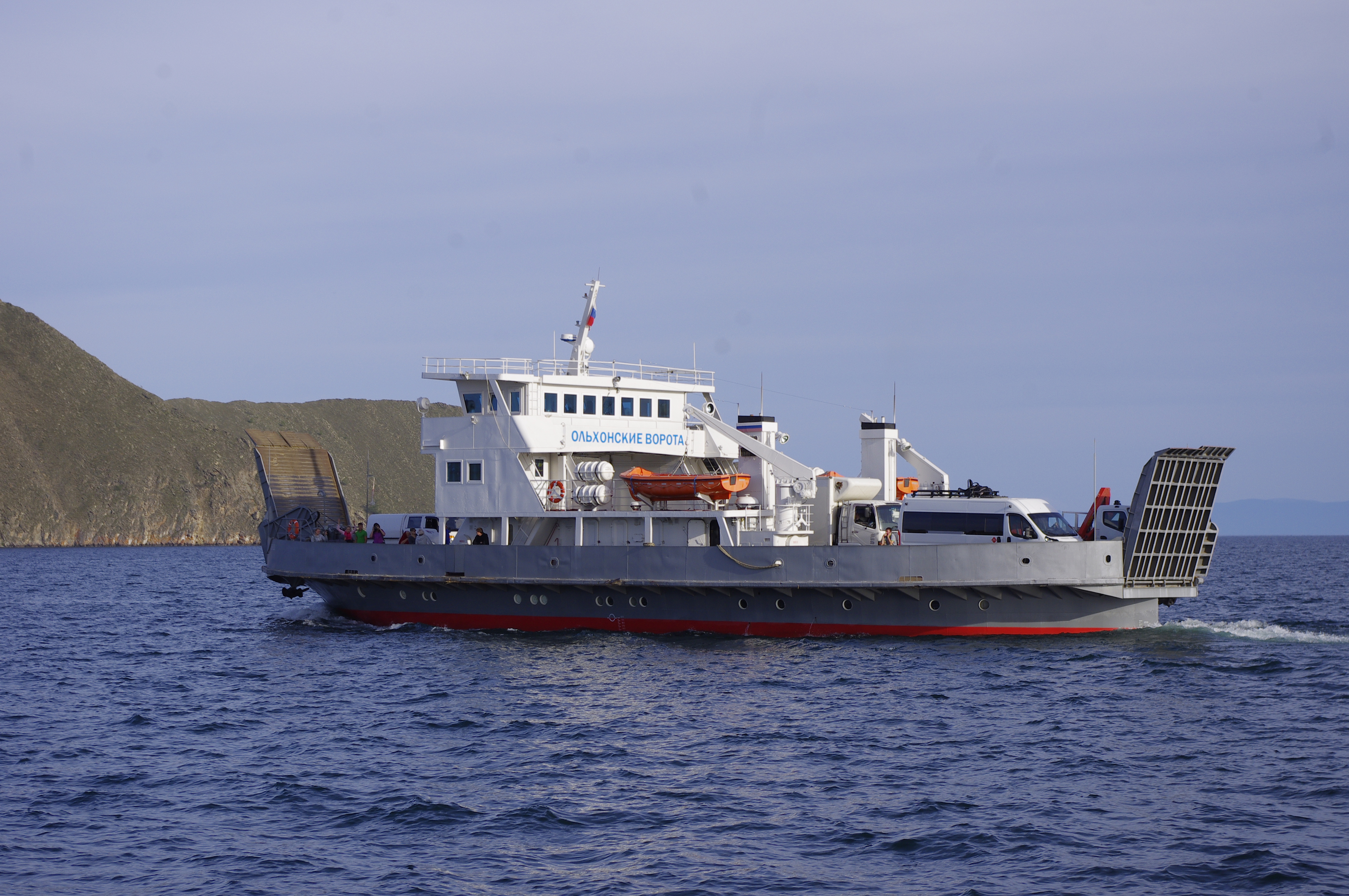
The ferry travels to Olkhon Island
