= UTC+02:30 =

Former time zone

- Time zone

UTC offset
- UTC: UTC+02:30

Current time
- 15:12, 21 July 2025 UTC+02:30 [refresh]

Central meridian
- 37.5 degrees E

Date-time group
- B*

UTC+02:30 is an identifier for a time offset from UTC of +02:30. In ISO 8601 the associated time would be written as 2025-07-21T15:12:46+02:30.

== History ==
During the late 19th century, Moscow Mean Time was introduced in Russia, originally at UTC+02:30. After the October Revolution, the time zone was changed to UTC+03:00.

The British company rule in Rhodesia also briefly observed this offset, adopting it on 1 August 1899 before switching to UTC+02:00 in 1903.

== See also ==
- Moscow Time
- Time in Russia
