= Decree time =

Changes introduced to the Soviet Union time system

Decree time (Russian: декретное время, romanized: Dekretnoe vremia) refers to the changes introduced to the Soviet Union time system by a Sovnarkom decree of 16 June 1930. By this decree, all clocks in the Soviet Union were permanently shifted one hour ahead at 00:00 on 21 June 1930 everywhere in the Soviet Union. Applicability of this decree was further extended by two other decrees in 1930 and 1931. The practice was further extended, and its legal basis was amended, in 1980.

It is independent from daylight saving time, which was introduced in the USSR much later, in 1981. In fact, with both time shifts in effect, summer time was two hours ahead of standard time in the USSR.

From 1982 to 1986, decree time was gradually abolished by the Soviet government in 30 oblasts and autonomous republics of the Russian SFSR. In 1989, it was further abolished in Estonia, Latvia, Lithuania, Ukraine and Moldavia, followed by the entire territory of the Soviet Union in March 1991 (nine months before its dissolution).

On 23 October 1991, the Supreme Soviet of the Russian SFSR ruled to restore decree time in Russia. It was restored on 19 January 1992 at 02:00, with the following exemptions:

- the Kaliningrad Oblast was permitted to use Eastern European Time instead of Moscow Time;
- all federal subjects that would have to use Samara Time in absence of this exemption (Adygea, most part of Arkhangelsk Oblast, Astrakhan Oblast, Chechnya, Chuvashia, Dagestan, Ingushetia, Ivanovo Oblast, Kabardino-Balkaria, Kalmykia, Karachay-Cherkessia, Kostroma Oblast, Kirov Oblast, Krasnodar Krai, Lipetsk Oblast, Mari El, Mordovia, Nizhny Novgorod Oblast, North Ossetia-Alania, Penza Oblast, Rostov Oblast, Ryazan Oblast, Samara Oblast, Saratov Oblast, Stavropol Krai, Tambov Oblast, Tatarstan, Udmurtia, Ulyanovsk Oblast, Vladimir Oblast, Volgograd Oblast, Vologda Oblast, Voronezh Oblast, Yaroslavl Oblast) were permitted to use Moscow Time instead;
- the whole Arkhangelsk Oblast and Komi Republic were permitted to use Moscow Time;
- the Tyumen Oblast was permitted to use Yekaterinburg Time instead of Omsk Time; and
- the whole Krasnoyarsk Krai was permitted to use Krasnoyarsk Time (its easternmost parts would have to use Irkutsk Time otherwise).

Most of these exemptions are equivalent to abolition of decree time in corresponding territories. At present, all these federal subjects use the exemptions.

In 1992 decree time was only restored in Armenia, Azerbaijan, Georgia, and Kazakhstan, with further changes after 1992 (see the corresponding page in the Russian Wikipedia).

== History ==
=== In USSR ===
In 1917, summer time was introduced in Russia for the first time, introduced by a decree of the Provisional Government for the period from 1 July to 31 August 1917 - it was ahead of local solar time by 1 hour. By the end of the period, this order was extended until 1 October, and then again - "until further notice". In accordance with the decree of the Soviet government. On 27 December 1917, the clocks were moved back by 1 hour. Local solar time was used in the USSR until the full introduction of the time zone system in 1924. In Moscow and part of the territory of the RSFSR, the time zone system was introduced in 1919.

==== Time in 1918-1929 ====
In 1918-1921, summer time was introduced in Russia without any order, and from the summer of 1918 to the spring of 1924, in Moscow and in the regions controlled by the Soviet government, mainly in the European part of the country, an advanced time was in effect all year round:

- 1918 (summer period) - local average solar plus 2 hours (decree);
- 1918 (winter period) - local mean solar plus 1 hour (decree);
- 1919 (summer period) - local average solar plus 2 hours (decree hours)), from 1 July - standard time plus 2 hours (decrees);
- 1919 (winter period) - standard time plus 1 hour (decree hour));
- 1920 (all year round) - standard time plus 1 hour;
- 1921 (summer period) - standard time plus 3 hours (decrees));
- 1921 (winter period) - standard time plus 1 hour (decree hour));
- 1922—1923 (all year round) - standard time plus 1 hour;
- 1924 — standard time plus 1 hour, from 2 May - standard time (resolution).

From 1925 to 1929, the country operated on standard time without switching to daylight saving time.

==== Beginning of the period of decree time ====
In accordance with the decree of 16 June 1930 clocks throughout the USSR at 00:00 on 21 June 1930 were moved forward by 1 hour for the period until 30 September 1930, as stated in the Great Soviet Encyclopedia, "for the purpose of more rational use of daylight hours and the redistribution of electricity between household and industrial consumption" (The date of 30 September up until 1930 was considered in the USSR as the end date of the so-called economic year, which began on 1 October).

Resolution of 30 September 1930 extended the validity of the previous decree "until a special decree". This document was the decree of 9 February 1931, which kept the two previous decrees in force "until repealed." The first two decrees were published in the Izvestia newspaper (without commentary) the day after their release, on 17 June 1930 and 1 October 1930, respectively. The publication of the decree of 9 February 1931, at least in the Izvestia newspaper, has not been found. The introduction of the new timekeeping system coincided with the initial period of collectivization and industrialization in the USSR.

It was established that the extension of the advance time in September 1930 was connected to a greater extent not with energy savings, but with the aim of reducing the maximum load of power plants in the fall and winter in the evening hours. The operation of power plants at that time was characterized by an extremely low reserve capacity or a complete lack of such a reserve, therefore in 1931 the Supreme Council of the National Economy proposed to move the clocks forward by another hour, but the State Planning Committee opposed it.

In 1935, a government decree was being prepared on returning to standard time; it passed all the necessary approvals, but for some reason was not adopted. In early December 1935, a number of newspapers reported that the clocks would allegedly be moved back by 1 hour on 1 January. The Politburo of the Central Committee of the All-Union Communist Party (Bolsheviks) issued a resolution on this matter, according to which the head of the Central Administration of Weights and Measures K. V. Shur received a reprimand "for publishing information about this inappropriate project", and newspaper editors were instructed on "the inadmissibility of publishing reports about draft decisions submitted to the government for consideration but not adopted by the government". After this, TASS issued a refutation (published, for example, in the newspapers Pravda and Trud on 23 December 1935): "TASS is authorized to report that no movement of the clock hand back by an hour is proposed and such proposals are considered inappropriate by the government".

The decree of 9 February 1931 not only extended the validity of the decrees of 1930, but also cancelled the decree of 8 February 1919 with the designated time zone boundaries, assigning the function of establishing the boundaries to the Time Service Committee at the Pulkovo Observatory. Perhaps in the years following this, new time zone boundaries would have appeared, but it is known that a large group of the observatory's employees were repressed in 1936-1937, and in 1947 the Interdepartmental Commission of the Unified Time Service was created under the Committee for Measures and Measuring Instruments under the Council of Ministers of the USSR - the function of establishing the boundaries of time zones passed to it.

==== Changes after 1937 ====
On the 1938 USSR transport map, the time zone boundaries are marked by a line called in the legend: "Boundary of the zones of international time (practically accepted)." The boundaries plotted on the map correspond to the boundaries established in 1924 according to the decree of 8 February 1919.

According to cartographic data, after 1937 changes were made that eliminated the use of different times in relatively small areas. Thus, daylight saving time in some regions (in their western part) was changed by 1 hour forward, ahead of the standard time established in 1924 by 2 hours, and in others (in the eastern part) - by 1 hour back, that is, the "daylight saving hour" was actually cancelled.

After Latvia, Lithuania and Estonia joined the USSR, the clocks on their territory in August 1940 were switched from GMT+2 to Moscow time, GMT+3, which was also established in the Kaliningrad region on 7 April 1946.

In accordance with the decision of the Interdepartmental Commission of the Unified Time Service, from 1 December 1956, the official boundaries of time zones were to change, in particular to eliminate the presence of a number of regions in two time zones. As a result, daylight saving time in a number of places had to change either by 1 hour forward or by 1 hour back. The clocks were planned to be changed on 1 December 1956 at 00:00 Moscow time, but the procedure was postponed to 1 March 1957. Information about the clock change on this day was in the newspapers "Sovetskaya Rossiya" and "Gudok", however, it was not in other central newspapers (Izvestia, Trud). Obviously, the change of clocks in the regions was described in local newspapers. For example, in the regional newspaper Zvezda (Molotov region) it was noted that "today, March 1, in the Karagai, Ocher, Sivinsky, Vereshchaginsky districts of our region, the working day began an hour earlier than before. (…) Now in our entire region, the time differs from Moscow by two hours".

==== Ahead of standard time by 2 hours ====
The time zone established in 1924 was 2 hours ahead of the standard time in the western part of the following regions:

- by 1947 - Kostroma, Ivanovo, Vladimir, Ryazan, Lipetsk, Voronezh and Rostov regions and a number of other regions;
- by 1962 - excluding those listed above, Altai Krai, Arkhangelsk, Vologda, Novosibirsk, Perm, Sakhalin (Sakhalin Island), Tomsk, Tyumen and Chita regions of the RSFSR, Ural and Guryev regions of the Kazakh SSR and a number of other regions.

==== The de facto abolition of decree time in a number of regions ====
After the 1957 reform, some regions in the European part of the RSFSR, located east of Moscow in longitude, while officially remaining in the 3rd time zone, switched to Moscow time, that is, they moved their clocks back 1 hour, thereby effectively abolishing the "decree hour" on all or part of their territory. The explanation on the subsequently published maps of time zones in the geographical atlases of the USSR was, for example, as follows: "Territories in which the actual accepted time differs from the decree time (not officially approved)". In other republics of the USSR there were no similar changes until 1989.

By 1973, the "decree hour" was abolished in the following regions (in all or part of the region's territory):

- Dagestan, Kabardino-Balkaria, Kalmykia, Komi, Mari, Mordovian, North Ossetian, Tatar, Chechen-Ingush, Chuvash, Yakut ASSR (Ust-Maisky and Tomponsky districts); Krasnodar, Stavropol, Krasnoyarsk, Khabarovsk territories; Amur, Arkhangelsk, Vladimir, Vologda, Voronezh, Gorky, Ivanovo, Irkutsk, Kostroma, Lipetsk, Magadan, Penza, Rostov, Ryazan, Tambov, Tyumen, Yaroslavl regions.

In 1977-1980, the Komi ASSR switched to Moscow time, which effectively meant the abolition of daylight saving time in the western part of the republic, including Syktyvkar, and the establishment of "zone time minus 1 hour" in the eastern part.

==== An attempt to restore the lost "decree hour" ====
In 1981, the country introduced regular daylight saving time. In addition to the introduction of summer time, it was necessary to establish the correspondence of the applied time to the administrative time zones, that is, to restore the abolished "decree hour" in a number of regions (especially in the 3rd time zone). The need for this was noted by Doctor of Technical Sciences, Professor V. V. Boytsov, who was at that time the Chairman of the State Commission for Unified Time and Standard Frequencies of the USSR, Chairman of the State Standard.

On 1 April 1981, all regions of the USSR switched to summer time, and on 1 October of the same year, about 30 regions of the RSFSR, mainly in the European part of the country, did not set their clocks back, remaining for the winter period with restored daylight saving time. According to the updated list (it did not include Udmurtia and added regions of Yakutia and the region of Uzbekistan), the following regions were not supposed to set their clocks back:

- Dagestan, Kabardino-Balkarian, Kalmyk, Komi, Mari, Mordovian, North Ossetian, Tatar, Chechen-Ingush and Chuvash ASSR; Krasnodar and Stavropol Krais; Arkhangelsk, Vladimir, Vologda, Voronezh, Gorky, Ivanovo, Kostroma, Lipetsk, Penza, Rostov, Ryazan, Tambov, Tyumen and Yaroslavl Oblasts;
- Nenets and Evenki Autonomous Okrugs, Khatanga District of the Taimyr (Dolgano-Nenets) Autonomous Okrug; Ust-Maisky, Ust-Aldansky and Oymyakonsky Districts of Yakutia and the Jizzakh Region of the Uzbek SSR.

However, after the winter had passed, newspapers noted that the clarification of the boundaries of time zones and the new order of calculating time in them caused discontent among the population, as this led to a disruption of the usual way of life of people, especially residents of the 3rd time zone, accustomed to Moscow time, and: "Especially in those areas where people watched live TV broadcasts from the capital. Now they sat in front of their TV sets an hour later than the local time count. Hence the many letters asking to restore the previous order.".

From the newspaper "Trud" dated 20 February 1982:

Will the time zone in the central regions of the country be changed? - numerous readers of Trud ask.

As is known, last year from 1 April to 1 October, summer time was introduced in the country. At the same time, the boundaries of time zones were approved. With the approval of these boundaries, a clear order of time calculation was established in the country, fully consistent with the International Time Zone System and taking into account the existing administrative-territorial division. As the analysis showed, summer time has fully justified itself in economic terms. In addition, the population was given the opportunity to better use daylight hours for rest after work. At the same time, problems arose in the process of streamlining the calculation of time, primarily in the regions that on 1 October 1981, were transferred from Moscow time to the time of the 3rd time zone (Moscow time +1 hour). This caused numerous letters from workers to the Trud newspaper and other press outlets.

As reported by the State Commission for Unified Time and Standard Frequencies of the USSR to Trud correspondent A. Vasilenko, вAs a result of the analysis of letters from the localities, it was decided to restore the timekeeping procedure that was in effect in the territory of a number of autonomous republics, territories, regions and autonomous districts of the RSFSR before 1 October 1981. In particular, from 1 April of this year. Summer time will not be introduced in the territory of Dagestan, Kabardino-Balkaria, Kalmykia, Komi, Mari, Mordovia, North Ossetia, Tatar, Chechen-Ingush and Chuvashia ASSRs, Krasnodar and Stavropol Krais, Arkhangelsk, Vladimir, Vologda, Voronezh, Gorky, Ivanovo, Kostroma, Lipetsk, Penza, Rostov, Ryazan, Tambov, Tyumen and Yaroslavl Oblasts, Nenets and Evenki Autonomous Okrugs, and Khatanga District of the Taimyr (Dolgano-Nenets) Autonomous Okrug. As a result, the listed territories will be in effect from 1 April of this year. g. will again live by Moscow time, with the exception of the Tyumen region, where the time will differ from Moscow by 2 hours, as well as the Evenki Autonomous Okrug and the Khatanga district of the Taimyr (Dolgano-Nenets) Autonomous Okrug - by 4 hours. On 1 October of this year, all regions of the country without exception will be transferred to winter time, including those listed above. The citation lists all the regions that, according to the updated list, were not supposed to change their clocks on 1 October 1981, excluding the Ust-Maisky, Ust-Aldansky and Oymyakonsky districts of Yakutia and the Jizzakh region of the Uzbek SSR.

So, in the spring of 1982, the regions mentioned in the quote did not change their clocks to summer time, and in the fall they changed them back along with everyone else by 1 hour, returning to their usual "winter" time (without "decree hour"). According to some information, The clocks were not changed in the spring of 1982 in the eastern part of the Chukotka Autonomous Okrug, where the "decree hour" was also cancelled.

==== Abolition of decree time in 1988-1991 ====
In 1988-1990, they switched to the time of the neighboring Western time zone, effectively abolishing daylight saving time:

- 27.03.1988 — Volgograd and Saratov regions;
- 26.03.1989 — Latvia, Lithuania, Estonia, Astrakhan, Kaliningrad, Kirov, Kuibyshev and Ulyanovsk regions, as well as the Ural region of Kazakhstan;

The State Commission of Unified Time and Standard Frequencies of the USSR announces that on Sunday, 26 March 1989, summer time will be introduced on the territory of the Soviet Union. The transition to summer time will be made at 2:00 a.m. on 26 March by moving the clock forward by 1 hour.

In connection with the decision of the government of the USSR to change the time calculation in the Latvian SSR, Lithuanian SSR, Estonian SSR, Astrakhan, Kaliningrad, Kuibyshev, Kirov, Ulyanovsk regions of the RSFSR and the Ural region of the Kazakh SSR, the hour hand in these territories is not moved.

- 06.05.1990 — Moldova;
- 01.07.1990 —Ukraine (Decree time was effectively restored by the abolition of the autumn clock change 30.09.1990).

Georgia also abolished daylight saving time in 1990. In addition, several regions, including Belarus, refused to change the clocks seasonally. In a TASS news story about 1990, it was noted:

And yet, under pressure from public opinion, last year Belarus, Uzbekistan, Tajikistan, and Azerbaijan did not introduce summer time. Moldova and Georgia abandoned decree time. The same decision was made in Ukraine, but the clock hands were not moved "to winter" here. Some autonomous republics, territories, and regions of the Russian Federation used the opportunity to move the clock hands in their own way.

From 31 March 1991 (the date of the next change of clocks to summer time), daylight saving time was officially abolished throughout the territory of the USSR, except for the Turkmen SSR and the western part of the territory of the Uzbek SSR. At the same time, the seasonal change of clocks was maintained everywhere, but (according to the decree) could not be applied in the Kazakh, Kirghiz, Tajik, Turkmen and Uzbek SSRs. All these circumstances determined the following planned order of transition of regions to summer time on 31 March 1991:

- Clocks are not changed in most of the USSR (the source provides a full list of regions). Clocks are changed forward by 1 hour: Georgia, Latvia, Lithuania, Estonia, Moldova, Komi ASSR, Kaliningrad Oblast, Nenets Autonomous Okrug. Clocks are changed back by 1 hour: Kazakhstan (except Uralsk Oblast), Kyrgyzstan, Tajikistan, eastern regions of Uzbekistan.

At the end of the summer time period on 29 September 1991, the clock hands in the territory of the USSR, with the exception of Kazakhstan, Kyrgyzstan, Uzbekistan, Turkmenistan, and Tajikistan, were moved back one hour.

On the eve of the scheduled date, a slightly different order of the said procedure was published - in particular, the seasonal change of clocks in Kazakhstan was maintained:

- The clocks are not changed in most of the USSR. The full list of regions given in the source includes the following union republics: Armenia, Azerbaijan, Belarus, Kazakhstan (except the Ural region), Turkmenistan, Ukraine. The clocks are changed forward by 1 hour: Georgia, Latvia, Lithuania, Estonia, Moldova, the Ural region of Kazakhstan, the Kaliningrad region. The clocks are changed back by 1 hour: Kyrgyzstan, Tajikistan, eastern regions of Uzbekistan.

At the end of the summer time period on 29 September 1991, the clock hands in the territory of the USSR, with the exception of Kyrgyzstan, Uzbekistan, Turkmenistan, and Tajikistan, were moved back one hour.

The actual procedure in a number of regions in the spring and especially in the fall of 1991 differed from the planned one. For example, the Kaliningrad region, which switched to MSK-1 time in 1989 (UTC+2 in winter), According to the plan, on 31 March 1991, it was supposed to return to Moscow time. However, on 29 March, the regional council of people's deputies decided to "maintain the existing time difference between Moscow and Kaliningrad" — the clocks were not changed in the region on 31 March, and after the clock change on 29 September 1991, UTC+1 time began to operate in the Kaliningrad region.

Another difference could be that the planned spring change of clocks in three regions by 1 hour back was carried out (according to unconfirmed information) after the end of the summer period:

- 31.08.1991 —Kyrgyzstan;
- 09.09.1991 — Tajikistan;
- 29.09.1991 — Uzbekistan.

After the clocks were moved back 1 hour on 29 September 1991, Moscow time became UTC+2. Some regions, such as Samara Oblast, refused to change the clocks in the autumn of 1991. It is possible that the Astrakhan, Volgograd, Kirov, Saratov regions and Udmurtia, as well as a number of other regions, did the same - this is shown by the subsequent events described.

The abolition of daylight saving time in 1991 took place without taking into account the fact that many regions had already effectively abolished the "daylight saving hour" in 1957-1989, switching to the time of the neighboring Western time zone. Therefore, in these regions, local time from 29 September 1991 began to lag behind the standard time established in 1924 by 1 hour, and in the country as a whole, "winter" time was shifted back by 1 hour almost everywhere.

The abolition of daylight saving time in the union republics in 1989-1991 coincided with the collapse of the USSR.

==== Decision on the restoration of decree time in the RSFSR ====
On 23 October 1991, the Council of the Republic of the Supreme Soviet of the RSFSR, by its resolution, obliged the government to restore daylight saving time on the territory of the RSFSR, stating that the implementation of the resolution of 4 February 1991 "on the abolition of daylight saving time and moving the clock back one hour on September 29, 1991 led to a reduction in the length of daylight hours on a significant part of the territory of the RSFSR, caused discontent among the population and led to an increase in electricity consumption.".

The Kaliningrad region, by decision of local authorities, managed to move the clocks forward by 1 hour on 3 November 1991 — before the onset of winter and before the collapse of the USSR.

=== In Russia after 1991 ===
==== Restoration of daylight saving time ====
The return of decree time was carried out on 19 January 1992 by the government decree of 8 January 1992. Regions of Russia, except for the Kaliningrad region and a number of other regions, moved their clocks forward by 1 hour. According to different sources, which provide different information, the following regions were not supposed to move their clocks on 19 January 1992:

- Astrakhan, Kirov, Saratov regions;
- Astrakhan, Volgograd, Saratov regions, Udmurtia, Chechnya and Tatarstan;
- Astrakhan, Volgograd, Kirov, Samara, Saratov regions and Udmurtia.

From a statement in the local newspaper Argumenty i Fakty v Samara: "The Council of Ministers of the RSFSR returned the region to its previous time zone in September 1991.", It follows that the 1-hour difference with Moscow time could have returned for Samara on 29 September, when Moscow time became UTC+2, and UTC+3 continued to operate in the Samara region. The clock change in the Samara region on 19 January 1992, together with most regions, by 1 hour forward was a mandatory condition for maintaining the 1-hour difference with Moscow time. Therefore, it is most likely (based on a combination of sources) that the Astrakhan, Volgograd, Kirov, Saratov regions and Udmurtia did not change their clocks on 19 January 1992. In these regions, except for Udmurtia, UTC+3 was in effect in the winter of 1991-1992 until the transition to summer time in March 1992, and UTC+4 was in effect in Udmurtia.

The decree of 8 January 1992 also officially approved the use of the time of the neighboring Western time zone in a number of regions, which had been going on for many years (the actual abolition of daylight saving time) - it allowed the use of:

Moscow time minus one hour in the Kaliningrad region;

Moscow time in the regions assigned to the 3rd time zone (the republics of Adygea, Dagestan, Ingushetia, Kabardino-Balkaria, Kalmykia, Karachay-Cherkessia, Mari El, Mordovia, North Ossetia, Tatarstan, Udmurtia, Chechnya and Chuvashia, Krasnodar and Stavropol territories, most of the Arkhangelsk region, Astrakhan, Vladimir, Volgograd, Vologda, Voronezh, Ivanovo, Kirov, Kostroma, Lipetsk, Nizhny Novgorod, Penza, Rostov, Ryazan, Samara, Saratov, Tambov, Ulyanovsk and Yaroslavl regions);

Moscow time in the Arkhangelsk region and the Komi SSR;

time of the 4th time zone (MSK+2) in the Tyumen region;

time of the 6th time zone (MSK+4) throughout the Krasnoyarsk Territory.

As of 1992 (after 19 January), such permitted time was in effect in all the regions listed above, except for Udmurtia and Samara Oblast.

Since the transition to daylight saving time in Russia was not cancelled, on 29 March 1992, clocks in all regions were moved forward by 1 hour. There were no changes in official time in any regions in March 1992 (in the quote below, the italics of the source):

In 1930, "daylight saving time" was introduced, adding one hour to the standard time. Last year, the government tried to cancel it altogether in order to finally return to the natural, standard time. But many protested sharply, and legislators cancelled the government's decision. So we live, in a sense, synchronizing our watches "by Stalin."

So, on the night of March 28–29, move your clocks forward an hour - summer time is coming.

==== Period 1993-2010 ====
In 1993-2002, they switched to the time of the neighboring western time zone, effectively abolishing daylight saving time in the eastern part of the region (in the Altai Republic - throughout the entire territory):

- 23.05.1993 — Novosibirsk region;
- 28.05.1995 — Altai Republic and Altai Krai;
- 30.03.1997 — Sakhalin region;
- 01.05.2002 — Tomsk region.

Proposals to re-switch Samara Oblast to the neighboring Western Time Zone (Moscow Time) were considered in 1997-1998, but there was no consensus among the population. The issue was postponed and raised again in February 2008.

In 2001, the Legislative Duma of the Tomsk Region initiated a bill to abolish both maternity leave and summer time in Russia(the issue of calculating time at that time was regulated by a decree of the Russian government), but it was rejected by the State Duma. Another bill on the general abolition of both maternity and summer time was introduced by State Duma deputies in November 2009, but it received a negative response from the Russian government and was subsequently withdrawn by the initiators.

In 2009-2010, President Medvedev initiated a campaign to reduce the number of time zones in Russia. Since 28 March 2010, decree time has been effectively abolished in Udmurtia, Kamchatka Krai, Kemerovo and Samara Oblasts and in the western part of the Chukotka Autonomous Okrug. By the beginning of 2011, the "maternity leave hour" had been abolished in all or part of the territory of approximately 60% of the regions where, according to the 2002 census, approximately 50% of the population of Russia lived. In the eastern part of the Komi Republic, the Nenets and Chukotka Autonomous Okrugs, the time in effect during the winter period was 1 hour behind the standard time established in 1924.

=== In the former Soviet republics ===
The abolition of the "maternity leave hour" in Abkhazia and South Ossetia took place on 26 October 2014.

As of 2016:

- Decree time was actually applied in Azerbaijan, Armenia, Belarus, Georgia, Kazakhstan, Kyrgyzstan, the Republic of Crimea, Turkmenistan and the western part of Uzbekistan;
- applied the transition to summer time: Latvia, Lithuania, Moldova, Transnistria, Ukraine, Estonia;
- did not apply the transition to daylight saving time: Abkhazia, Azerbaijan, Armenia, Belarus, Georgia, Kazakhstan, Kyrgyzstan, Tajikistan, Turkmenistan, Uzbekistan, South Ossetia.

== Post 2010 period ==
=== Transition to permanent daylight saving time ===
Despite the actual abolition of daylight saving time in most regions of Russia, the procedure for calculating time "zone time plus one hour" with an annual transition to summer time officially (according to documents) continued to operate in all regions until the government decree of 31 August 2011, which declared almost all articles of the resolution of 8 January 1992 to be invalid.

On 27 March 2011, the clocks were switched to summer time, and the subsequent return to "winter" time was cancelled by the decree of 31 August 2011. The law "On the calculation of time" adopted on 3 June 2011, among other things, introduced new concepts into official circulation - time zone and local time. Thus, formally the concepts of decree time, standard time were abolished, but in fact the order of "standard time plus one hour" continued to operate in many regions along with the permanent summer time, left in 2011. Local time all year round in many regions began to be ahead of the standard time established in 1924 by 2 hours, and in some - by 3 hours.

Representatives of the country's energy sector have spoken out in favor of "the option of maintaining both maternity and summer time throughout the year". Attention was paid to the size and time of daily peaks in electricity consumption under different time calculation options in the regions of Russia, which may have had an impact on electricity exports to neighboring countries located in other time zones. Thus, according to data from the Eastern Energy Company OJSC from the About the Company website, after 2011 the volume of electricity exports to China and Mongolia increased significantly.

=== Abolition of permanent daylight saving time ===
The 2011 reform did not find support among a significant part of the Russian population. Permanent summer time was abolished on 26 October 2014 by amendments to the law "On the calculation of time". All regions changed their clocks except Udmurtia, Samara and Kemerovo regions, Kamchatka Krai and Chukotka Autonomous Okrug. Zabaikalsky Krai and Magadan Oblast changed their clocks back by 2 hours, and the other regions changed their clocks back by 1 hour. For the eastern part of Magadan Oblast, this was another (after 1973) transition to the neighboring western time zone, and the official time there began to lag one hour behind the standard time established in 1924.

=== Actual return of decree time in a number of regions ===
In 2016, 10 regions, including Zabaikalsky Krai and Magadan Oblast, moved their clocks forward by 1 hour. Initiatives to change local time were justified in a number of regions by the fact that they had been using daylight saving time for a long time. For example, in Altai Krai, UTC+6 was in effect in the western part of the region until 1957, and UTC+7 in the eastern part. From 1957 to 1994, UTC+7 was in effect throughout the entire territory of the region. In 1981, a seasonal clock change was introduced (UTC+8 in summer), and in 1995, Altai Krai moved its clocks back by 1 hour — summer time became UTC+7, and "winter" time became UTC+6. The initiators of the local time change believed that without a seasonal clock change, UTC+7 would be more familiar and convenient for the population.

Overall, during the period 2011-2018, the "decree hour" returned to almost all regions that had abolished it in 1988-2010 (Astrakhan, Barnaul, Volgograd, Gorno-Altaysk, Izhevsk, Kemerovo, Novosibirsk, Petropavlovsk-Kamchatsky, Samara, Saratov, Tomsk, Ulyanovsk), and the two-hour advance of the standard time established in 1924 was restored in the west of the Altai and Transbaikal Territories, Novosibirsk, Tomsk and Sakhalin (Sakhalin Island) Regions.

== Ahead of time in other countries ==
Some countries have also been using advanced time for many years — the time of the neighboring Eastern Time Zone. However, the circumstances and purposes of introducing such time are different and differ from those in the USSR in 1930-1931. The introduction of advanced time is essentially a one-time transfer of historically established work and study schedules to an earlier interval of the day according to local solar time. The introduction of such time is usually associated with a special period in the life of society, for example, a war or an economic crisis, when a ban on changing the work schedule may be established — otherwise there will be no desired effect.

=== Consequence of military occupation ===
Before World War II, Western European Time (WET, UTC) was in effect in Belgium, France, Spain and a number of other countries. During the war, Central European Time (CET, UTC+1) was introduced in these and other occupied countries: in the Netherlands on 16 May 1940, in Belgium on 20 May 1940, in France on 14 June 1940 — at the time of introduction, it was Central European Summer Time (CEST, UTC+2. The dates indicated correspond to the period of occupation of these countries. Spain, although not officially participating in World War II, also effectively switched to Central European Time, keeping its summer time (WEST, UTC+2) unchanged in the fall of 1940.

Central European Time was also introduced during this period in the occupied territories east of Germany. For example, in Minsk, the clocks were moved back by 1 hour (to Central European Summer Time) on 28 June 1941, and in Kyiv - on 20 September 1941. After moving the clocks back by another 1 hour on 2 November 1942, the current time in these cities began to lag behind the geographic zone time by 1 hour.

From this it can be assumed that the advanced time in Western European countries during the occupation appeared not "for the purpose of more rational use of daylight hours and the redistribution of electricity between household and industrial consumption", as in the USSR in 1930, but for political reasons. Western European countries did not return to the previous time after the war, since the unified Central European Time turned out to be more convenient due to close economic and transport links with neighboring countries.

During World War II, summer time was in effect year-round in the USA from 9 February 1942 to 30 September 1945. England used UTC+1 from 25 February 1940 until 2 November 1947, with a break in 1946, and in the summer of 1941–45 and 1947, the so-called Double Summer Time was in effect.

=== Experiments in the post-war period ===
Summer time was in effect in England all year round from 18 February 1968 to 31 October 1971. D. House in his book "Greenwich Time and the Discovery of Longitude" (Chapter 6) writes that England tried to experiment to align its time with Central European Time. However, the experiment had to be stopped, since "this innovation caused general discontent in the country, especially the population of the westernmost regions of Great Britain objected to it" .

Ahead of time, with the aim of reducing the number of time zones, was introduced in the westernmost state of Brazil, Acre, in 2008, but the reform did not find support among the population of this state. Clocks in the state of Acre were moved forward by 1 hour in June (winter) 2008, were moved back by 1 hour in November 2013 - the state of Acre returned to the UTC−5 time zone.

Ahead time has been in effect in Argentina for many years, but the time calculation procedure has changed several time. There have been periods of constant UTC−4, seasonal UTC−4 and UTC−3, constant UTC−3, and seasonal UTC−3 and UTC−2. Since 15 March 2009, Argentina has had a constant UTC−3.

In China, since 1949, a single Beijing time (UTC+8) has been in effect officially, which is essentially an advanced time for the central and, especially, western regions of the country, such as Xinjiang and Tibet. The working and school day in these areas begins 2 hours later than in Beijing according to Beijing time. For reasons of convenience, a significant portion of the population in these areas prefers to use the local unofficial time - Urumqi time (UTC+6), which is more in line with local solar time.

=== In the post-Soviet space ===
As of 2019, advanced time is in effect in most regions of Russia, Azerbaijan, Armenia, Belarus, Georgia, Kazakhstan, Kyrgyzstan, Turkmenistan and the western part of Uzbekistan. Advanced time was cancelled, but the clock change to daylight saving time was retained: Lithuania, Latvia, Moldova, Ukraine, Estonia. Advanced time was cancelled in Abkhazia, Tajikistan, the eastern part of Uzbekistan and South Ossetia.

=== Attempts to abolish advanced time ===
In Spain, the long-standing advanced time has led to the daily routine being perceived by many foreigners as unusually late – despite being, in many ways, not in accordance with local solar time (see Time in Spain). In September 2013, a parliamentary commission studying the rational daily routine of the Spanish people presented a report to the government proposing a return to Greenwich Mean Time. However, no positive decision was made. In December 2016, the Spanish government reported that the issue of moving the clocks back by 1 hour was under discussion. The example of Spain shows that the abolition of advanced time, which has been in effect for a long period (tens of years), can be difficult.

== Ahead of Time in Fiction ==
I. A. Bunin, while in Odessa, experienced the period of 1919 when the Soviet government, temporarily operating in this territory, used advanced (in Bunin’s diary – "Soviet") time. From the diary entry of 22 April: "In the evenings it’s terribly mystical. It’s still light, but the clock shows something absurd, night-time." From the entry of 11 June, from a conversation with the janitor Foma:

And I think that they, these Red Army soldiers, are the root of evil. All rabid, all bandits. Just count how many of them have crawled out of their holes now. And how they mock a peaceful citizen! He walks down the street and suddenly: "Comrade citizen, what time is it?" And he foolishly takes out his watch and blurts out: "Two and a half." - "What, mother of your soul, two and a half, when now in our, Soviet style, it's five? Does that mean you're for the old regime?" - He snatches up his watch and smashes it on the pavement.! (Note: The difference of 2.5 hours between the "Soviet" time of a Red Army soldier and the time of an Odessa resident is obtained if "Soviet" is Moscow time, which was 2 hours ahead of local time in Moscow from May 31 to July 1, 1919. The difference in longitude between Moscow and Odessa gives an addition of 0.5 hours.)

From the story by A. I. Solzhenitsyn "One Day in the Life of Ivan Denisovich":

Here they brought a tank to melt snow for mortar. We heard from someone that it was already twelve o'clock.

"It must be twelve o'clock," Shukhov announced. "The sun is already at the pass."

"If it's at the pass," the captain responded, "then it's not twelve o'clock, but one o'clock."

"Why is that?" Shukhov was amazed. "All the old men know: the sun is highest at noon."

"That's for the old men!" the captain snapped. "And since then there's been a decree, and the sun is highest at one o'clock."

"Whose decree is that?"

"The Soviet government's!"

"The captain came out with a stretcher, but Shukhov wouldn't argue. Does the sun really obey their decrees?

== Versions of the reason for the introduction of decree time ==
The official version, as stated in the Great Soviet Encyclopedia, states that daylight saving time was introduced "for the purpose of more rational use of daylight hours and the redistribution of electricity between household and industrial consumption", is the most probable. Indeed, the change of clocks in 1930 by 1 hour ahead fell in the middle of the first five-year plan (1928-1932), during a difficult period for the country of the beginning of industrialization and the corresponding shortage of resources. Analysis of documents from the 1930s shows that the need to use advanced time throughout the year was largely due not to saving fuel for power plants, but to the lack of their capacity to cover maximum loads in the winter after the end of daylight hours.

The original version was put forward in the 1990s by E. A. Polyak, referring to some facts from the biography of biophysicist A. L. Chizhevsky. Chizhevsky's monograph "Physical Factors of the Historical Process", published in 1924, in particular, attempted to link surges in social activity of the masses with 11-year cycles of solar activity, which Polyak wrote about in detail in 2010 in an article dedicated to the 115th anniversary of Chizhevsky's birth. After 1924, during his work in the zoopsychology laboratory, Chizhevsky could also have come up with the idea of reducing the social activity of the masses due to some mass disruption of biorhythms and sleep function due to the widespread shift in clocks. On the eve of collectivization in the USSR, measures were needed to mitigate possible surges in social activity in the village. Polyak suggests that decree time was introduced "on the territory of the former USSR in 1929-1930, probably not without the participation of A. L. Chizhevsky.".

== See also ==
- Time in Russia
