= Time in Russia =

Time spanning Europe and Asia

Time in Russia: KALT / Kaliningrad Time / UTC+2 / (MSK−1); MSK / Moscow Time / UTC+3 / (MSK±0); SAMT / Samara Time / UTC+4 / (MSK+1); YEKT / Yekaterinburg Time / UTC+5 / (MSK+2); OMST / Omsk Time / UTC+6 / (MSK+3); KRAT / Krasnoyarsk Time / UTC+7 / (MSK+4); IRKT / Irkutsk Time / UTC+8 / (MSK+5); YAKT / Yakutsk Time / UTC+9 / (MSK+6); VLAT / Vladivostok Time / UTC+10 / (MSK+7); MAGT / Magadan Time / UTC+11 / (MSK+8); PETT / Kamchatka Time / UTC+12 / (MSK+9)

There are 11 time zones in Russia, which currently observe times ranging from UTC+02:00 to UTC+12:00. Daylight saving time (DST) has not been used in Russia since 26 October 2014. From 27 March 2011 to 26 October 2014, permanent DST was used. About 63% of the Russian population live in MSK (UTC+03:00).

== List of zones ==
Since 27 December 2020, the time zones are as follows:

Time zone name	Time of day and abbreviation	UTC offset	MSK offset	Area covered	Population (2024)
Kaliningrad Time	00:26, 10 October 2026 KALT [refresh]	UTC+02:00	MSK−1h	Kaliningrad Oblast	1,033,914
Moscow Time	01:26, 10 October 2026 MSK [refresh]	UTC+03:00	MSK+0h	Most of European Russia (excluding federal subjects in UTC+02:00, UTC+04:00 and UTC+05:00 time zones)	90,966,037
Samara Time	02:26, 10 October 2026 SAMT [refresh]	UTC+04:00	MSK+1h	Astrakhan Oblast, Samara Oblast, Saratov Oblast, Udmurtia and Ulyanovsk Oblast	9,066,773
Yekaterinburg Time	03:26, 10 October 2026 YEKT [refresh]	UTC+05:00	MSK+2h	Bashkortostan, Chelyabinsk Oblast, Khanty–Mansi Autonomous Okrug, Kurgan Oblast, Orenburg Oblast, Perm Krai, Sverdlovsk Oblast, Tyumen Oblast and Yamalia	20,650,578
Omsk Time	04:26, 10 October 2026 OMST [refresh]	UTC+06:00	MSK+3h	Omsk Oblast	1,818,093
Krasnoyarsk Time	05:26, 10 October 2026 KRAT [refresh]	UTC+07:00	MSK+4h	Altai Krai, Altai Republic, Kemerovo Oblast, Khakassia, Krasnoyarsk Krai, Novosibirsk Oblast, Tomsk Oblast and Tuva	12,418,513
Irkutsk Time	06:26, 10 October 2026 IRKT [refresh]	UTC+08:00	MSK+5h	Irkutsk Oblast and Buryatia	3,302,459
Yakutsk Time	07:26, 10 October 2026 YAKT [refresh]	UTC+09:00	MSK+6h	Amur Oblast, Zabaykalsky Krai and most of the Sakha Republic (excluding districts in UTC+10:00 and UTC+11:00 time zones)	2,687,353
Vladivostok Time	08:26, 10 October 2026 VLAT [refresh]	UTC+10:00	MSK+7h	Jewish Autonomous Oblast, Khabarovsk Krai, Primorsky Krai, and the Oymyakonsky, Ust-Yansky and Verkhoyansky districts of the Sakha Republic	3,254,616
Magadan Time	09:26, 10 October 2026 MAGT [refresh]	UTC+11:00	MSK+8h	Magadan Oblast, Sakhalin Oblast, and the Abyysky, Allaikhovsky, Momsky, Nizhnekolymsky, Srednekolymsky and Verkhnekolymsky districts of the Sakha Republic	615,477
Kamchatka Time	10:26, 10 October 2026 PETT [refresh]	UTC+12:00	MSK+9h	Chukotka and Kamchatka Krai	336,976

== Daylight saving time ==
Prior to 2011, Russia moved its clocks backward and forward on the same annual cycle as Europe. On 27 March 2011, clocks were advanced as usual, but they did not go back on 30 October 2011, effectively making Moscow Time UTC+04:00 permanently. On 26 October 2014, following another change in the law, the clocks in most of the country were moved back one hour, but summer daylight saving time was not reintroduced; Moscow Time returned to UTC+03:00 permanently.

== History ==
=== Russian Empire ===
In the Russian Empire, most of the nation observed solar time. For 126 years, 2 months and 22 days, which lasted from Wednesday, 15 July [26 July, N.S.] 1741, until Saturday, 7 October [19 October, N.S.] 1867 at 3:30 p.m. GMT+14:59 in the capital of New Archangel (Sitka) (00:31 GMT), Alaska belonged to Russia (Russian America) which used the Julian calendar, which was 11 or 12 days behind the Gregorian calendar (as used by the rest of Russia) and had local times up to GMT+15:10. The westernmost area of Russia was Congress Poland, with local times down to GMT+01:10.

During the late 19th century, Moscow Mean Time was introduced on 1 January [13 January, N.S.] 1880, originally at GMT+02:30:17. 2:30:17 corresponds to 37.6166667°, the longitude of Moscow. Other parts of Russia kept solar time for several years.

Russia adopted the Gregorian calendar in 1918, when Wednesday 31 January (O.S.) was followed by Thursday 14 February (N.S.), which dropped 13 days from the calendar.

=== Soviet Union ===
After the Soviet Union was created, Moscow Time became UTC+02:00 and the various other time zones (up to UTC+12:00) were introduced throughout Russia and the rest of the Soviet Union, for example Irkutsk Time UTC+07:00 (Irkutsk has since this always been MSK+5). Between 1917 and 1922 the time was less ordered, with daylight saving time some of those years, some with two hours addition, and some of those years with one or two hours extra winter time.

On 21 June 1930, the Soviet Union advanced all clocks by one hour, effectively making the nation run on daylight saving time all year (the so-called decree time).

=== Decree time ===
In 1930, according to the decree of the Council of People's Commissars of the USSR clocks across the country were moved forward by 1 hour from 21 June to 30 September, but the effect of this decree was then extended — later this time became known as decree time. The extension was due to a lack of electricity due to overloading of power plants in winter in the evening hours. In 1931, the Supreme Council of the National Economy proposed moving the clocks forward another hour, but the State Planning Committee opposed it. In 1935, a return to standard time was planned, which was never implemented.

==== Changes after 1937 ====
After 1937 changes were made that eliminated the use of different times in relatively small areas. Thus, daylight saving time in some regions (in their western part) was changed by 1 hour forward, already 2 hours ahead of the standard time established in 1924, and in others (in the eastern part) - by 1 hour back, that is, the "daylight saving hour" was effectively abolished.

From 1 December 1956, the official boundaries of time zones were to change, in particular to eliminate the presence of a number of regions in two time zones. As a result, daylight saving time in a number of places had to change either by 1 hour forward or by 1 hour back. The clocks were planned to be changed on 1 December 1956 at 00:00 Moscow time, but this happened on 1 March 1957, as reported in the central newspapers. The change of clocks in the regions was described in local newspapers. Thus, in the regional newspaper in the Molotov region it was noted that "today, on 1 March, in the Karagai, Ocher, Sivinsky, Vereshchaginsky regions of our region the working day began an hour earlier than before. (…) Now in our entire region the time differs from Moscow by two hours".

After the 1957 reform, some regions in the European part of the RSFSR, located to the east of Moscow, officially remaining in the 3rd time zone, switched to Moscow time, thereby effectively abolishing the “decree hour” on all or part of their territory.

By 1962, the time zone established in 1924 was 2 hours ahead of the standard time in some parts of the following regions: Altai Krai, Arkhangelsk, Vologda, Novosibirsk, Perm, Sakhalin (Sakhalin Island), Tomsk, Tyumen and Chita regions of the RSFSR, Ural region of the Kazakh SSR, as well as a number of other regions.

By 1973, the "decree hour" was abolished in the following regions (in all or part of the region's territory):

- Dagestan, Kabardino-Balkaria, Kalmykia, Komi, Mari, Mordovian, North Ossetian, Tatar, Chechen-Ingush, Chuvash, Yakut ASSR (Ust-Maisky and Tomponsky districts); Krasnodar, Stavropol, Krasnoyarsk, Khabarovsk territories; Amur, Arkhangelsk, Vladimir, Vologda, Voronezh, Gorky, Ivanovo, Irkutsk, Kostroma, Lipetsk, Magadan, Penza, Rostov, Ryazan, Tambov, Tyumen, Yaroslavl regions.
- In 1977-1980, the Komi ASSR switched to Moscow time, which effectively meant the abolition of daylight saving time in the western part of the republic, including Syktyvkar, and the establishment of “zone time minus 1 hour” in the eastern part

==== Introduction of daylight saving time ====
From 1 April 1981, the country introduced regular switching of clocks to summer time. At the same time, it was necessary to restore the conformity of the applied time with the administrative time zones, in other words, to restore the “decree hour” that had been cancelled in various years in a number of regions. This was especially true for the regions of the 3rd time zone that switched to Moscow time, where, as of 1980, only Astrakhan, Volgograd, Izhevsk, Kirov, Kuibyshev (Samara), Saratov and Ulyanovsk retained their local time.

On 1 April 1981, all regions moved their clocks forward by 1 hour, and on 1 October 1981, about 30 regions of the RSFSR did not move their clocks back, so that they could switch to summer time in the spring of 1982, relative to the restored decree time. However, due to the discontent of the population, these regions did not move their clocks to summer time in the spring of 1982, and in the fall they moved them back along with everyone else by 1 hour, returning to their usual winter time (without the "decree hour"). Thus, in those regions of the 3rd time zone, where Moscow time was used before 1981, MSK+1 time was in effect only from 1 October 1981 to 1 April 1982. The newspapers noted that the clarification of the boundaries of time zones and the new order of calculating time in them led to a disruption of the usual way of life of people, especially residents of the 3rd time zone, accustomed to Moscow time, and: "Especially in those areas where people watched live TV broadcasts from the capital. Now they sat in front of their TV sets an hour later than the local time count. Hence the many letters asking to restore the previous order.".

After the introduction of seasonal clock changes, local time in the summer in many regions began to be ahead of the standard time established in 1924 by 2 hours, and in some by 3 hours. For example, the average solar noon in the west of Novosibirsk and Tomsk regions in the summer began to occur at 15:00, in the west of Altai Krai - at 14:48, in the west of Chita Oblast (Zabaikalsky Krai since 2008) - at 14:49.

==== Reforms of the time before the collapse of the USSR ====
In 1988, Volgograd and Saratov regions switched to the time of the neighboring western time zone, that is, they effectively abolished daylight saving time; in 1989, the Latvian, Lithuanian and Estonian SSRs, the Astrakhan, Kaliningrad, Kirov, Kuibyshev and Ulyanovsk regions, as well as the Ural region of the Kazakh SSR; in 1990, Georgia and Moldova. In addition, in 1990, some union republics abandoned seasonal clock changes.

From 31 March 1991, decree time was officially abolished throughout the USSR., except for Turkmenistan and the western regions of Uzbekistan. At the same time, the seasonal change of clocks in 1991 was maintained in almost the entire territory of the USSR (except for the Tajik, Turkmen and Uzbek SSRs).

Decree time was abolished without taking into account the fact that in many regions of the RSFSR it had already been abolished. Therefore, in these regions, local time from 29 September 1991 began to lag behind the standard time established in 1924 by 1 hour, and in the country as a whole, "winter" time almost everywhere shifted back by 1 hour.

The abolition of decree time in the union republics in 1989-1991 coincided with the period of the collapse of the USSR.

On 23 October 1991, the Council of the Republic of the Supreme Soviet of the RSFSR, by its resolution, obliged the government to restore daylight saving time on the territory of the RSFSR, stating that the implementation of the resolution of 4 February 1991 "on the abolition of daylight saving time and moving the clock back one hour on 29 September 1991 led to a reduction in the length of daylight hours on a significant part of the territory of the RSFSR, caused discontent among the population and led to an increase in electricity consumption.".

=== Russian Federation ===
11 time zones in Russia from 2002 to 2010: UTC+02 Kaliningrad Time UTC+03 Moscow Time UTC+04 Samara Time UTC+05 Yekaterinburg Time UTC+06 Omsk Time/ Novosibirsk Time / UTC+07 Krasnoyarsk Time UTC+08 Irkutsk Time UTC+09 Yakutsk Time UTC+10 Vladivostok Time UTC+11 Magadan Time UTC+12 Kamchatka Time

Russia and most republics in the Soviet Union abolished the decree time (not moving the clocks) on 31 March 1991, but Russia reversed this the following year (except Samara Oblast which was already in UTC+04:00).

On 20 October 1991, Samara Oblast changed its time zone from MSK to MSK+1 (thus reinstating Samara Time; MSK+1), so from UTC+03:00 to UTC+04:00.

On 19 January 1992, decree time was reintroduced.

On 23 May 1993, Novosibirsk Oblast changed its time zone from MSK+4 to MSK+3. The change occurred during DST, effectively changing the offset from UTC+08:00 to UTC+07:00, the offset without DST was therefore changed from UTC+07:00 to UTC+06:00.

On 28 May 1995, Altai Krai and Altai Republic changed its time zone from MSK+4 to MSK+3.

On 30 March 1997, Sakhalin Oblast changed its time zone from MSK+8 to MSK+7.

In May 2002, Tomsk Oblast changed its time zone from MSK+4 to MSK+3.

April 2010: 9 zones: UTC+02 Kaliningrad Time UTC+03 Moscow Time UTC+05 Yekaterinburg Time UTC+06 Omsk Time UTC+07 Krasnoyarsk Time / UTC+08 Irkutsk Time UTC+09 Yakutsk Time UTC+10 Vladivostok Time UTC+11 Magadan Time

The following time zone changes occurred on 28 March 2010, which, in particular, led to abolition of two of the eleven time zones.

- The Udmurt Republic and Samara Oblast started using Moscow Time, thus eliminating Samara Time (MSK+1 or UTC+04:00 without DST).
- Kemerovo Oblast started using Omsk Time.
- Chukotka Autonomous Okrug and Kamchatka Krai started using Magadan Time, thus eliminating Kamchatka Time (MSK+9 or UTC+12:00 without DST).

Although the Russian government wanted to reduce the number of time zones even further, there were protests in far-eastern Russia on the changes, including a 20,000-strong petition in support of Kamchatka returning to UTC+12:00.

September 2011: 9 zones, "permanent DST".: UTC+03:00 Kaliningrad Time UTC+04:00 Moscow Time UTC+06:00 Yekaterinburg Time UTC+07:00 Omsk Time / UTC+08:00 Krasnoyarsk Time UTC+09:00 Irkutsk Time UTC+10:00 Yakutsk Time UTC+11:00 Vladivostok Time UTC+12:00 Magadan Time

Decree No. 725 of 31 August 2011 changed the UTC offset for Moscow Time and the other time zones. Moscow Time Zone began using UTC+04:00 all year around. The notions of decree time and daylight saving time were abolished, but in fact, this decree mandated permanent daylight saving time (or even double daylight saving time in regions that had not abolished the decree time).

The decree also changed the offset of some parts of the Sakha Republic from Moscow. Oymyakonsky District switched from Magadan Time (MSK+8) to Vladivostok Time (MSK+7), and the following areas switched from Vladivostok Time (MSK+7) to Yakutsk Time (MSK+6):

- Eveno-Bytantaysky National District
- New Siberian Islands
- Tomponsky District
- Ust-Maysky District

1 April 2010 (with DST)

1 September 2011 ("permanent DST")

Yakutsk Time
Vladivostok Time
Magadan Time
(MSK+6)
(MSK+7)
(MSK+8)

October 2014: 11 zones

As a result of the annexation of Crimea by the Russian Federation, local authorities in the Republic of Crimea and Sevastopol decreed that clocks in the newly proclaimed Russian federal subjects should jump ahead two hours at 22:00 on 29 March 2014 to switch from Eastern European Time (UTC+02:00) to Moscow Time (UTC+04:00).

In July 2014, further changes were passed, which took effect on 26 October 2014. Almost all of Russia moved back one hour, so Moscow Time became UTC+03:00 again. Some areas changed offset from Moscow:

- Udmurtia and Samara Oblast remained on UTC+04:00 (thus reinstating Samara Time, MSK+1)
- Kemerovo Oblast remained on UTC+07:00 (went from Omsk to Krasnoyarsk Time)
- Zabaykalsky Krai moved back two hours to UTC+08:00 (went from Yakutsk to Irkutsk Time)
- Magadan Oblast moved back two hours to UTC+10:00 (went from Magadan Time, MSK+8 to Vladivostok Time, MSK+7)
- Chukotka Autonomous Okrug and Kamchatka Krai remained on UTC+12:00 (thus reinstating Kamchatka Time, MSK+9)

The parts of the Magadan Time zone that remained on MSK+8 were given a new time zone name, Srednekolymsk Time, UTC+11:00. Annual DST changes were not observed.

Time zones in Russia, difference with apparent solar time: –2 h ± 30 min –1 h ± 30 min ± 30 min +1 h ± 30 min +2 h ± 30 min

The following time zone changes occurred on 27 March 2016:

- Astrakhan and Ulyanovsk oblasts moved forward one hour from UTC+03:00 to UTC+04:00 (from Moscow to Samara time)
- Altai Krai and Altai Republic moved forward one hour from UTC+06:00 to UTC+07:00 (from Omsk to Krasnoyarsk time)
- Zabaykalsky Krai moved forward one hour from UTC+08:00 to UTC+09:00 (from Irkutsk to Yakutsk time)
- Sakhalin Oblast moved forward one hour from UTC+10:00 to UTC+11:00 (from Vladivostok to Srednekolymsk time), except Severo-Kurilsky District, which was already in UTC+11:00 (Srednekolymsk Time)

On 24 April 2016, Magadan Oblast moved forward one hour from UTC+10:00 to UTC+11:00 (from Vladivostok to Srednekolymsk time). After this change, the UTC+11:00 time zone was again called Magadan Time.

On 29 May 2016, Tomsk Oblast moved forward one hour from UTC+06:00 to UTC+07:00 (from Omsk to Krasnoyarsk time).

On 24 July 2016, Novosibirsk Oblast moved forward one hour from UTC+06:00 to UTC+07:00 (from Omsk to Krasnoyarsk time).

On 4 December 2016, Saratov Oblast moved forward one hour from UTC+03:00 to UTC+04:00 (from Moscow to Samara time).

On 28 October 2018, Volgograd Oblast moved forward one hour from UTC+03:00 to UTC+04:00 (from Moscow to Samara time), but this change was reverted on 27 December 2020.

After the Russian annexation of Donetsk, Kherson, Luhansk and Zaporizhzhia oblasts in September 2022, the parts of these oblasts under Russian administration remained on Moscow Time (UTC+03:00) and did not revert to UTC+02:00 with the rest of Ukraine at the end of its daylight saving time period in October 2022. In April 2023, the Russian time zone law was changed to formally include these oblasts in Moscow Time.

== Railway time ==
Until 2018, all timetables on Russian Railways (except Sakhalin railways) followed Moscow Time. From 2018 time tables follow local time. Airports and flights follow local time.

== Tz Database ==
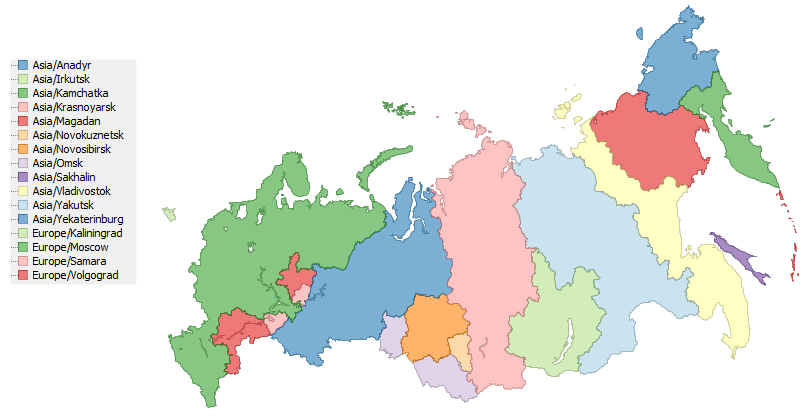
http://efele.net/maps/tz/russia – data from 2009

For Russia, the tz database contains several zones in the file zone.tab.

=== List of zones ===
The list below shows the 27 zones for Russia as defined in the file zone.tab of the database. The database aims to identify regions that had the same time offset rules since 1970.

Two federal subjects are contained in more than one tz zone. The Sakha Republic is divided into three: west, central, east. Sakhalin Oblast is divided into two: Sakhalin Island with Kurilsky and Yuzhno-Kurilsky districts in the Kuril Islands, and Severo-Kurilsky District in the Kuril Islands.

On the last Sunday in October 2011, daylight-saving time ended in tzdata, but all zones moved forward one hour. In other words, the clocks did not change, but the names of the time zones reverted permanently to their standard time variants and there will be no more daylight-saving time.

If available, the change column lists the offset changes that caused a creation of a new zone in the tz database.

"Initial zone" means that in 1970 there was already a difference in time offset from the offsets in any other zone.

C.c.	Coordinates	tzid	Comments	UTC offset (without DST, permanent since 2011)	Covered area	Split from	Changes
RU	+5443+02030	Europe/Kaliningrad	MSK-01 – Kaliningrad	+02:00	Kaliningrad Oblast	Initial zone	1989-03-26 Change from UTC+03:00 to UTC+02:00
RU	+554521+0373704	Europe/Moscow	MSK+00 – Moscow area	+03:00	Most of European Russia. Complete list given here.	Initial zone	
RU	+4457+03406	Europe/Simferopol	Crimea	+03:00	Crimea (Disputed - Reflects data in the TZDB.)		
RU	+5836+04939	Europe/Kirov	MSK+00 – Kirov	+03:00	Kirov Oblast		
RU	+4844+04425	Europe/Volgograd	MSK+00 – Volgograd	+03:00	Volgograd Oblast	Europe/Samara	1992-03-29 Zone creation, causing change from UTC+04:00 to UTC+03:00
RU	+4621+04803	Europe/Astrakhan	MSK+01 – Astrakhan	+04:00	Astrakhan Oblast		
RU	+5134+04602	Europe/Saratov	MSK+01 – Saratov	+04:00	Saratov Oblast		
RU	+5420+04824	Europe/Ulyanovsk	MSK+01 – Ulyanovsk	+04:00	Ulyanovsk Oblast	Europe/Moscow	2016-03-27 Zone creation, causing change from UTC+03:00 to UTC+04:00
RU	+5312+05009	Europe/Samara	MSK+01 – Samara, Udmurtia	+04:00	Samara Oblast and Udmurtia	Initial zone	2010-03-28 Change from UTC+04:00 to UTC+03:00
RU	+5651+06036	Asia/Yekaterinburg	MSK+02 – Urals	+05:00	Bashkortostan, Chelyabinsk Oblast, Khanty–Mansi Autonomous Okrug, Kurgan Oblast, Orenburg Oblast, Perm Krai, Sverdlovsk Oblast, Tyumen Oblast, and Yamalia	Initial zone	
RU	+5500+07324	Asia/Omsk	MSK+03 – Omsk	+06:00	Omsk Oblast		1995-05-28 Zone creation, causing change from UTC+07:00 to UTC+06:00; 1992-01-19 Change from UTC+05:00 to UTC+06:00
RU	+5502+08255	Asia/Novosibirsk	MSK+04 – Novosibirsk	+07:00	Novosibirsk Oblast		1993-05-23 Zone creation, causing change from UTC+07 to UTC+06; 2002-05-01 Change from UTC+07 to UTC+06
RU	+5322+08345	Asia/Barnaul	MSK+04 – Altai	+07:00	Altai Krai and Altai Republic		
RU	+5630+08458	Asia/Tomsk	MSK+04 – Tomsk	+07:00	Tomsk Oblast		
RU	+5345+08707	Asia/Novokuznetsk	MSK+04 – Kemerovo	+07:00	Kemerovo Oblast	Asia/Novosibirsk	2010-03-28 Zone creation, causing change from Krasnoyarsk Time to Novosibirsk Time
RU	+5601+09250	Asia/Krasnoyarsk	MSK+04 – Krasnoyarsk area	+07:00	Khakassia, Krasnoyarsk Krai, and Tuva Republic		
RU	+5216+10420	Asia/Irkutsk	MSK+05 – Irkutsk, Buryatia	+08:00	Irkutsk Oblast and Buryatia		
RU	+5203+11328	Asia/Chita	MSK+06 – Zabaykalsky	+09:00	Zabaykalsky Krai		
RU	+6200+12940	Asia/Yakutsk	MSK+06 – Lena River	+09:00	Amur Oblast and western Sakha Republic		
RU	+623923+1353314	Asia/Khandyga	MSK+06 – Tomponsky, Ust-Maysky	+09:00	Tomponsky District and Ust-Maysky District		
RU	+4310+13156	Asia/Vladivostok	MSK+07 – Amur River	+10:00	Jewish Autonomous Oblast, Khabarovsk Krai, Primorsky Krai, and central Sakha Republic	Initial zone	
RU	+643337+1431336	Asia/Ust-Nera	MSK+07 – Oymyakonsky	+10:00	Oymyakonsky District	Asia/Yakutsk	1981-04-01 Changed to Magadan time
RU	+5934+15048	Asia/Magadan	MSK+08 – Magadan	+11:00	Magadan Oblast	Initial zone	2014-10-26 Split: Magadan Oblast changed to Vladivostok time, other areas using new Srednekolymsk time
RU	+4658+14242	Asia/Sakhalin	MSK+08 – Sakhalin Island	+11:00	Sakhalin Island, and western Kuril Islands	Asia/Magadan	1997-03-30 Zone creation, causing change from UTC+11 to UTC+10
RU	+6728+15343	Asia/Srednekolymsk	MSK+08 – Sakha (E), N Kuril Is	+11:00	eastern Kuril Islands, and eastern Sakha Republic	Asia/Magadan	2014-10-26
RU	+5301+15839	Asia/Kamchatka	MSK+09 – Kamchatka	+12:00	Kamchatka Krai	Initial zone	2010-03-28 Change from UTC+12:00 to UTC+11:00
RU	+6445+17729	Asia/Anadyr	MSK+09 – Bering Sea	+12:00	Chukotka Autonomous Okrug	Initial zone	1982-04-01 Changed from UTC+13:00 to UTC+12:00; 2010-03-28 Changed from UTC+12:00 to UTC+11:00

=== Deleted zones ===
Asia/Ulan Ude was a time zone identifier from the zone file of the tz database. The reference point was Ulan-Ude. It was added in tz version 2011e. Edition 2011i did not contain it anymore. The area remained at Asia/Irkutsk. The contained data in zone.tab was:

RU
+5150+10736
Asia/Ulan_Ude
Moscow+05 – Buryatia

The covered area was Republic of Buryatia.

== See also ==
- Decree time
