= Yakuts =

Turkic ethnic group in North Siberia

Саха
- Flag of Yakutia

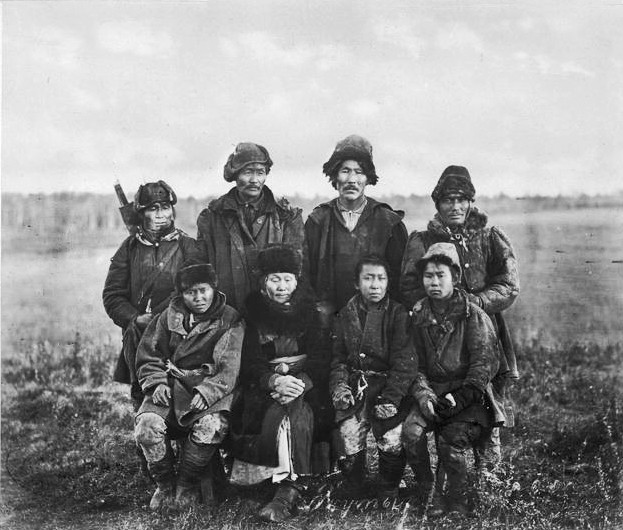
- Yakuts, early 20th century

Total population
- c. 500,000

Regions with significant populations
- Russia: 478,085 (2010)
- United States: 7,885 (2020)
- Canada: 4,933 (2021)

Languages
- Yakut and Russian (in Russia); English (in Canada and the U.S.)

Religion
- Orthodox Christianity, Aiyy Faith, Shamanism, Tengrism

Related ethnic groups
- Dolgans, Tuvans, Buryats, Mongols (partially, possibly through Kurykans), Evenks, Evens and Yukagirs

The Yakuts or Sakha (Yakut: саха, saxa; plural: сахалар, saxalar) are a Turkic ethnic group native to North Siberia, primarily the Republic of Sakha (Yakutia) in the Russian Federation. They also inhabit some districts of the Krasnoyarsk Krai. They speak Yakut, which belongs to the Siberian branch of the Turkic languages.

== Etymology ==
According to Yakut philosopher Alexey Kulakovsky, the Russian word yakut was taken from the Evenki екэ, yekə̄, while Marjorie Mandelstam Balzer claims the Russian word is actually a corruption from the Tungusic form. According to ethnographer Dávid Somfai Kara, the Russian yakut derives from the Buryat yaqud, which is the plural form of the Buryat name for the Yakuts, yaqa. The Yakuts call themselves Sakha.

== Origin ==
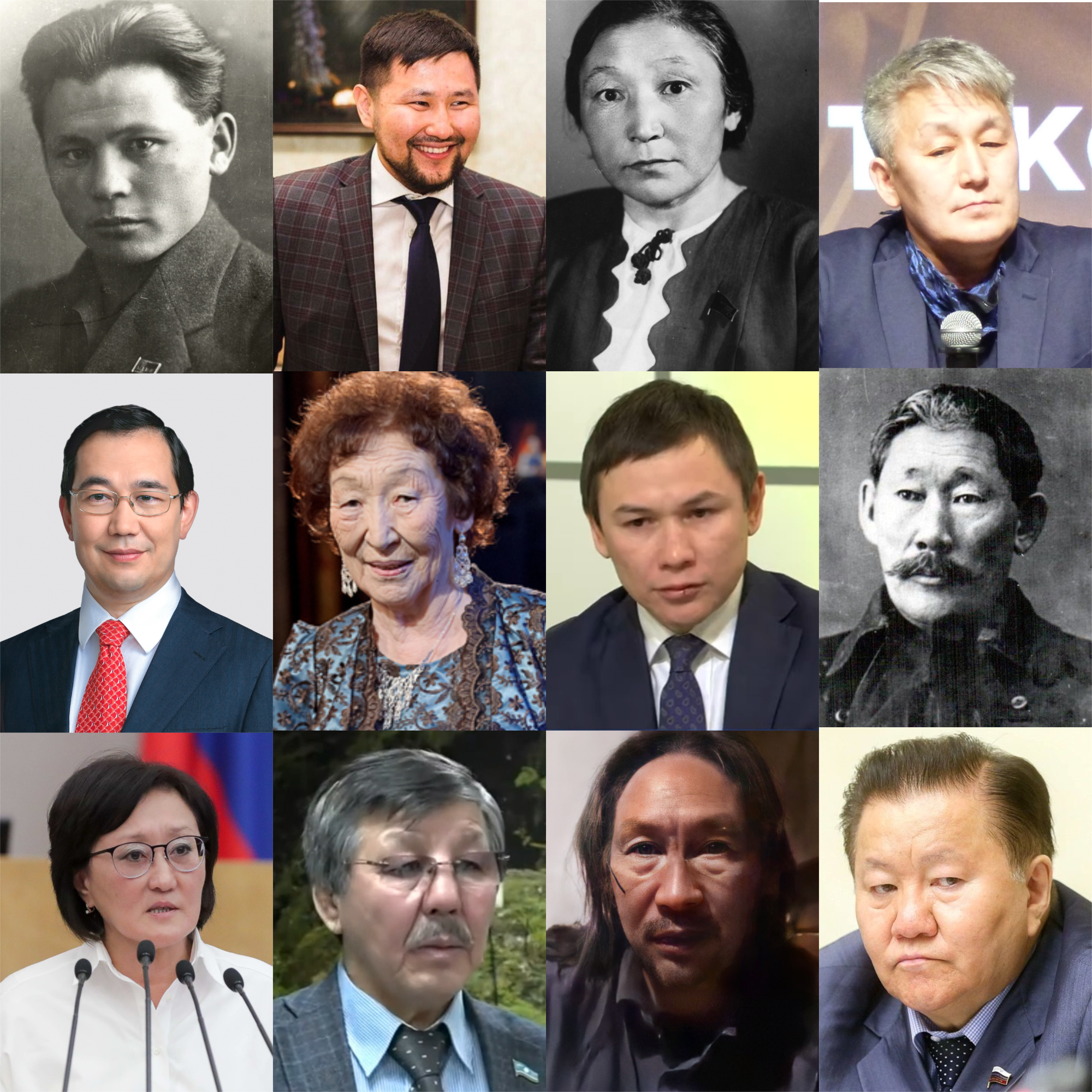
Famous Yakuts

An early work on Yakut ethnogenesis was drafted by the Russian Collegiate Assessors I. Evers and S. Gornovsky in the late 18th century. At an unspecified time in the past certain tribes resided around the western shore of the Aral Sea. These peoples later migrated eastward and settled near the Tunka Goltsy mountains of modern Buryatia. Pressure from the expansionist Mongolian Empire later made many of those around the Tunka Goltsy relocate to the Lena River. Several additional Altai-Sayan region tribes later arrived on the Lena to flee from the Mongols. The subsequent cultural melding that occurred between these incoming migrants eventually created the Yakuts. The Sagay Khakas of Abakan River were presented as the origin of the ethnonym Sakha by Evers and Gornovsky.

In the mid-19th century, Nikolai S. Schukin wrote "A Trip to Yakutsk" based on his experiences visiting the area. He presented a somewhat different origin of the Yakuts that is based upon local oral histories. Groups of Khakas inhabiting the southern Yenisey watershed migrated north to the Nizhnyaya Tunguska River to the Lena Plateau and finally onward to the Lena River. Schukin is credited as introducing the concept of Yenisey Khakas as the ancestors of the Yakut into Russian historiography. The most authoritative account in support of the Yenisey origin hypothesis was written by Nikolai N. Kozmin in 1928. He concluded that some Khakas moved from the Yenisey to the Angara River due to difficulties in the regional economy. In the 12th century, Buryats arrived at Lake Baikal and through military force pushed the Khakas to the Lena.

=== Lake Baikal ===
In 1893, Turkologist scholar Vasily Radlov connected the Kurykans or Gǔlìgān (Chinese: 骨利干) Tiele people from Chinese historical accounts with the Yakuts. They are mentioned as 7th-century tributaries of the Tang dynasty, reportedly living on the Angara and around Lake Baikal. Radlov hypothesized they were a mixture of Tungusic and Uyghur peoples and the forebears of the Yakut.

=== Khoro ===
The Khoro (Khorin, Khorolors, Khori) Sakha maintain their progenitor was Uluu Khoro, rather than Omogoy or Ellei. Scholarship has not definitively established their ancestral ethnic affiliations. Their homeland was somewhere in the south and called Khoro sire. When the Khorolors arrived in the Middle Lena remains uncertain, with scholars estimating from the first millennium to the 16th century AD.

Among scholars a commonly accepted hypothesis is that the Khoro Yakut originate from the Khori Buryat of Lake Baikal, and therefore spoke a Turko-Mongolic language. This is largely based on their similar ethnonyms. Proponents see the word Khoro as arising from the Tibetan word hor (Standard Tibetan: ཧོར). For example, according to G. N. Rumyanstev, during the 6th through 10th centuries CE the inhabitants of Lake Baikal were called Chor. Okladnikov guessed that Khoro sire was near China and adjacent to the X.

This premise is not universally accepted and has been challenged by some researchers. George de Roerich has argued that the word is based on the Chinese word hu (Chinese: 胡), a term used as general reference by the Chinese to refer to nomadic Mongolic peoples of Central Asia. In contemporary Tibetan hor is used to describe any pastoralist "nomad of mixed origin" regardless of their ethnonym. After researching their origins, Gavriil Ksenofontov concluded that while the Khorolors were "formed from parts of some alien tribe that mixed with the Yakuts", there was no compelling evidence connecting them with the Khori Buryat.

A more recent argument by Zoriktuev proposes that the Khorolors were originally Paleo-Asians from the Lower Amur River. In contrast to their Yakut relatives, Khoro folklore focuses largely on the Raven, with some tales about the Eagle as well. In the mid 18th century Lindenau noted the Khorolors focused their religious devotion on the Raven, who was alternatively referred to as "Our ancestor", "Our deity", and "Our grandfather" by the Khorolors. This reverence arises from the Raven enabling a struggling human (either the first Khoro man or his mother) to survive by giving a flint and tinder box. Their mythos is similar to cultures from both sides of the Bering Sea. The Haida, Tlingit, Tshisham of the North American Pacific Northwest Coast and the Paleoasians of the Siberian Coast like the Chukchi, Itelmen, and Koryaks all share reverence for the Raven.

=== Autochthonous ancestry ===
Many researchers have concluded that the Yakut ethnogenesis was an admixture of Turks migrating from Lake-Baikal and native Yukaghir and Tungusitic peoples residing around the Lena River. Okladnikov detailed this conceived admixture process as the following:

"...the Turkic-speaking ancestors of the Yakuts not only pushed out the aborigines but also subjected them to their influence by peaceful means; they assimilated and absorbed them into their mass... With this, the local tribes lost the former ethnic name and a proper ethnic consciousness, no longer separating themselves from the mass of Yakuts, and [were] not opposed to them... Consequently, as a result of the mixing with Northern aborigines, the southern ancestors of the Yakuts supplemented their culture and language with new features distinguishing them from other steppe tribes."

Traditional Yakut histories contain stories of the aboriginal peoples of Yakutia. From the subarctic Bulunsky and Verkhoyansky Districts, accounts state that the Black Yukaghir (Yakut: хара дъукаагырдар) descended from migrants pushed north from the Lena River. Related stories recorded in Ust'-Aldanskiy Ulus and Megino-Kangalassky District mention certain tribes leaving the region due to rising pressure from the incoming Yakuts. While some remained and intermarried with the newcomer, most went to the northern tundra.

==== Ymyyakhtakh ====
The Ymyyakhtakh are an ancient people of the Lena River. A burial ground was excavated and anthropologists I.I. Gokhman and L.F. Tomtosova studied the human remains and published their results in 1992. They concluded that some of the Late Neolithic population took part in the formation of the modern Yakuts. The consistency of related artistic embellishments on the traditional clothing of the Buryat, Samoyed, and Yakut led one scholar to conclude they are related. Toponymic data of Yakutia indicates there was once a presence of Paleoasian and Samoyed habitation in the region. Vilyui Tumats reportedly practiced anthropophagy and seen as an "ethnocultural marker" of the Samoyedic peoples.

==== Tumats ====
The Tumat stand out in Yakut tradition as a numerous and powerful society, with constant conflict once happening with them on the Vilyuy River. Their households were semi-subterranean with sod roofing and are comparable to traditional Samoyed dwellings. The term Doubo (Chinese: 都播) was used in medieval Chinese historical works in reference to the Sayano-Altai forest peoples. Vasily Radlov concluded that Doubo referred to the Samoyedic peoples. Doubo is additionally seen as the origin of the ethnonym "Tumat" by L. P. Potapov.

The Yakuts called the Tumat people "Dyirikinei" or "chipmunk people" (Yakut: Sдьирикинэй), arising from the Tumatian "tail-coat." Bundles of deer fur were dyed with red ocher and sewn into Tumatian jackets as adornments. Tumat hats were likewise dyed red. This style was likely spread by the Tumatians to some Tungusic peoples. Similar clothing has been reported during the 17th century for the Evenks on the upper Angara and for Evens residing on the lower Kolyma in the early 19th century. Additionally there are many similarities between the clothing of the Tumats and Altaic cultures. Archeological work on Pazyryk culture sites have turned up both hats dyed red and tail-coats made of sables. While the "tails" were not dyed red, they were sewn with red dyed thread. Stylistic and design choices are also comparable to traditional Khakas and Kumandin clothing.

Some peaceable interactions including intermarriage did occur with the Tumats. One such example is the life of Džaardaakh (Russian: Джаардаах), a Tumatian woman. She was renowned for her physical strength and martial repute as an archer. However Džaardaakh eventually married a Yakut man and is considered a notable ancestor of the local Vilyuy Yakut. The origin of her name has been linked to a Yukaghir word for ice (Yukaghir: йархан).

The ancestors of Yakuts were Kurykans who migrated from Yenisey river to Lake Baikal and were subject to a certain Mongolian admixture prior to migration in the 7th century. The Yakuts originally lived around Olkhon and the region of Lake Baikal. Beginning in the 13th century they migrated to the basins of the Middle Lena, the Aldan and Vilyuy rivers under the pressure of the rising Mongols. The northern Yakuts were largely hunters, fishermen and reindeer herders, while the southern Yakuts raised cattle and horses.

== History ==
=== Imperial Russia ===
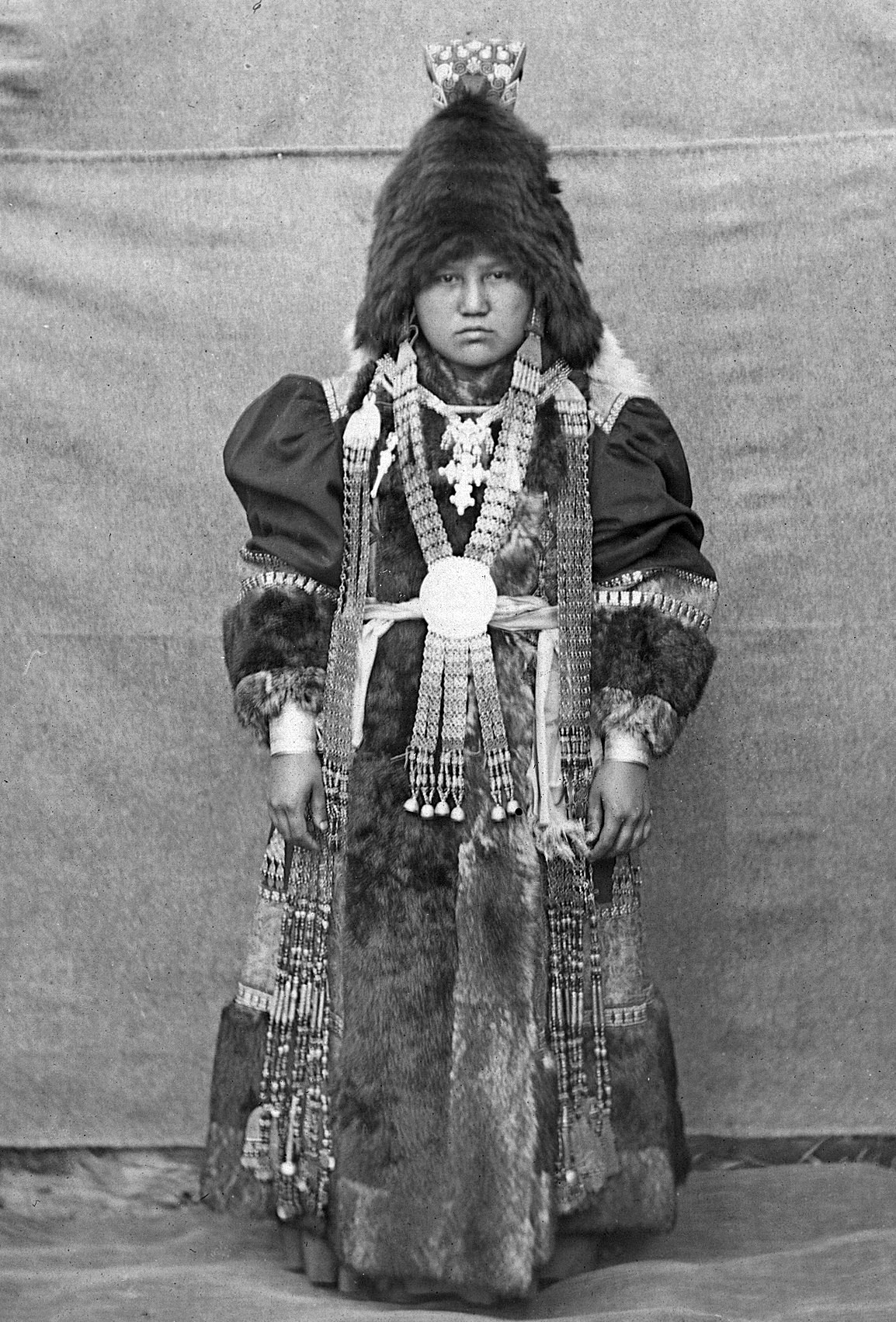
Yakut woman in the 1890s

In the 1620s, the Tsardom of Muscovy began to move into their territory and annexed or settled down on it, imposed a fur tax and managed to suppress several Yakut rebellions between 1634 and 1642. The tsarist brutality in collection of the pelt tax (yasak) sparked a rebellion and aggression among the Yakuts and also Tungusic-speaking tribes along the River Lena in 1642. The voivode Peter Golovin, leader of the tsarist forces, responded with a reign of terror: native settlements were torched and hundreds of people were killed. The Yakut population alone is estimated to have fallen by 70 percent between 1642 and 1682, mainly because of smallpox and other infectious diseases.

The discovery of gold and, later, the building of the Trans-Siberian Railway, brought ever-increasing numbers of Russians into the region. By the 1820s almost all the Yakuts claimed to have converted to the Russian Orthodox church, but they retained (and still retain) a number of tengri practices. Yakut literature began to rise in the late 19th century, and a national revival occurred in the early 20th century.

=== Russian Civil War ===
The last conflict of the Russian Civil War, known as the Yakut Revolt, occurred here when Cornet Mikhail Korobeinikov, a White Russian officer, led an uprising and a last stand against the Red Army.

=== Soviet Union ===
In 1922, the new Soviet government named the area the Yakut Autonomous Soviet Socialist Republic. In the late 1920s through the late 1930s, Yakut people were systematically persecuted, when Joseph Stalin launched his collectivization campaign. It is possible that hunger and malnutrition during this period resulted in a decline in the Yakut total population from 240,500 in 1926 to 236,700 in 1959. By 1972, the population began to recover.

=== Russian Federation ===
The percentage of Yakuts in the districts of Yakutia, in the 2010 census

Currently, Yakuts form a large plurality of the total population within the vast Republic of Sakha. According to the 2021 Russian census, there were a total of 469,348 Yakuts residing in the Sakha Republic during that year, or 55.3% of the total population of the Republic.

== Culture ==
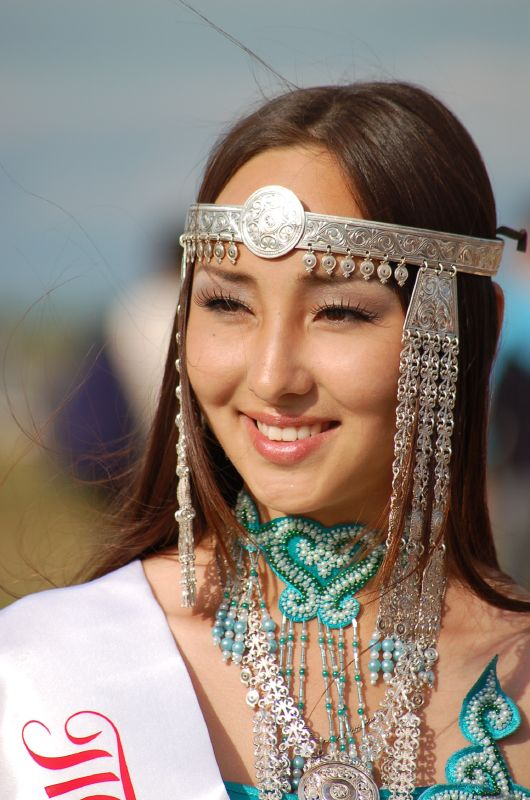
A Yakut woman in traditional dress

The Yakuts engage in animal husbandry, traditionally having focused on rearing horses, mainly the Yakutian horse, reindeer and the Sakha Ynagha ('Yakutian cow'), a hardy kind of cattle known as Yakutian cattle which is well adapted to the harsh local weather. There is a widespread notion among other ethnic minorities in Russia based on their experience (for example, among geographically close Mongolic Buryats) that the Sakha (i.e. Yakuts) are the least russified ethnic group in Russia and that the knowledge of the native language is widespread, particularly (as is often said) due to the cold and freezing nature of their geographical habitat, and Russians' general avoidance of colonizing those lands.

Certain rock formations named Kigilyakh, as well as places such as Ynnakh Mountain, are held in high esteem by Yakuts.

== Cuisine ==
The cuisine of Sakha prominently features the traditional drink kumis, dairy products of cow and mare milk, sliced frozen salted fish stroganina (строганина), loaf meat dishes (oyogos), fried carp, carp soup, horse meat, frozen fish, thick pancakes, and salamat—a millet porridge with butter and horse fat. Kuerchekh (Куэрчэх) or kierchekh, a popular dessert, is made of cow milk or cream with various berries. Indigirka is a traditional fish salad. This cuisine is only used in Yakutia.

== Language ==
An indigenous Sakha speaker

According to the 2010 census, some 87% of the Yakuts in the Sakha Republic are fluent in the Yakut (or Sakha) language, while 90% are fluent in Russian. The Sakha/Yakut language belongs to the Northern branch of the Siberian Turkic languages. It is most closely related to the Dolgan language, and also to a lesser extent related to Tuvan and Shor.

== DNA and genetics analysis ==
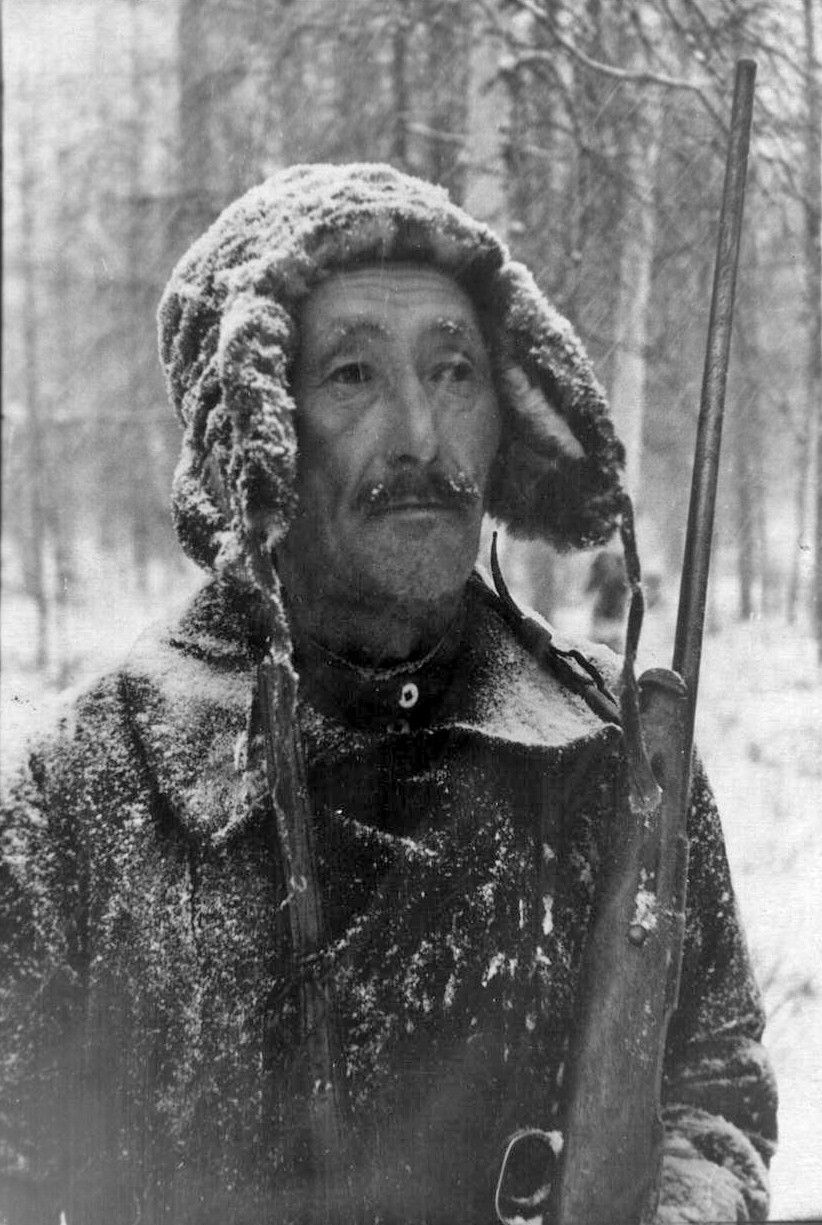
A Yakut hunter, early 20th century

The primary Y-chromosome DNA haplogroup for the Yakut is N-M231. While found in around 89% of the general population, in northern Yakutia it is closer to 82%. N-M231 is shared with various other Eastern Siberian populations. The remaining haplogroups are approximately: 4% C-M217 (including subclades C-M48 and C-M407), 3.5% R1a-M17 (including subclade R1a-M458), and 2.1% N-P43, with sporadic instances of I-M253, R1b-M269, J2, and Q.

According to Adamov, haplogroup N1c1 makes up 94% of the Sakha population. This genetic bottleneck has been dated approximately to AD 1300 ± 200 and it is proposed to have been caused by high mortality rates in warfare and later relocation to the Middle Lena River.

The primary mitochondrial DNA haplogroups are various East Asian lineages, making up 92% of the total: haplogroup C at 36% to 45.7% and haplogroup D at 25.7% to 32.9% of the Yakut. Minor Eastern Eurasian mtDNA haplogroups include: 5.2% G, 4.49% F, 3.55% M13a1b, 1.89% A, 1.18% Y1a, 1.18% B, 0.95% Z3, and 0.71% M7. According to Fedorova, besides East Asian maternal lineages, "the mtDNA pool of the native populations of Sakha contains a small (8%), but diverse set of western Eurasian mtDNA haplogroups, mostly present among Yakuts and Evenks", the most common being H and J.

According to a 2026 study, the genetic makeup of historical Yakuts from c. 1500 to 1922 was relatively homogenous and closely resembled that of modern Yakuts. Except for rare outliers, they can be modeled as a two-way admixture between populations that inhabited Iron Age Yakutia and the Baikal region from the thirteenth to fifteenth centuries. The Russian conquest of Yakutia also left minimal genetic impact on Yakuts. Overall, Yakuts cluster closer with Asian populations, especially Evenki, Ulchi and Buryats, than European or American populations.

Several genetic studies also state that Neolithic populations from Yakutia had Ancient Paleo-Siberian affinities and formed a genetic substratum for modern Siberian populations.

== Notable people ==
=== Academia ===
- Eduard Yefimovich Alekseyev, ethnomusicologist
- Georgiy Basharin, professor at the Yakutsk State University
- Zoya Basharina, professor at Yakutsk State University
- Gavriil Ksenofontov, researcher at Irkutsk State University
- Semyon Novgorodov, linguist

=== Arts ===
- Evgenia Arbugaeva, photographer, Oscar-nominated director

=== Cinema and Television ===
- Anna Kuzmina, actress

=== Entrepreneurship ===
- Arsen Tomsky, founder and CEO of the international ride-hailing service inDrive

=== Military ===
- Valery Kuzmin, Soviet pilot
- Fyodor Okhlopkov, was a Soviet sniper
- Vera Zakharova, was a Po-2 air ambulance pilot in the Soviet Air Force during World War II

=== Models ===
- Natalya Stroeva, Miss Russia 2018 (second runner-up)

=== Musicians ===
- Kjuregej, painter, actor, musician
- Sarantuya, mezzo-soprano singer

=== Politicians ===
- Maksim Ammosov
- Sardana Avksentyeva
- Isidor Barakhov
- Yegor Borisov
- Alexandra Ovchinnikova
- Platon Oyunsky
- Aysen Nikolayev
- Mikhail Nikolayev
- Yekaterina Novgorodova
- Fedot Tumusov

=== Rulers ===
- Tygyn Darkhan, ruler of the Yakuts

=== Sports ===
- Georgy Balakshin, boxer
- Roman Dmitriyev, former Soviet wrestler and Olympic champion
- Vasilii Egorov, boxer
- Vasily Gogolev, wrestler
- Eduard Grigorev, freestyle wrestler for Poland
- Gavril Kolesov, checkers player
- Pavel Pinigin, former Soviet wrestler and Olympic champion

=== Writers ===
- Albina Borisova, theatrical translator
- Natalia Kharlampieva, poet
- Sardana Oyunskaya, folklorist
- Aita Shaposhnikova, translator and critic
- Anastasia Syromyatnikova, writer
- Pyotr Toburokov, poet and children's writer

=== Other ===
- Alexander Gabyshev, political dissident

== Diaspora ==
The Sakha American Cultural Association, a non-profit organization, was established in Seattle, Washington in 2024.

"The Sakha people had made a temporary footprint in the U.S. in 1820 at Fort Ross in Jenner, California. According to the 1820 census, five Sakha men lived in the fort with 260 people, working for the Russian-American Company, a fur-trading business. This fort became a melting pot of different cultures, including Russians, Native Alaskans and local Native American tribes, such as the Kashaya Pomo. The Sakha were part of the diverse workforce that supported the fort operations in areas, such as hunting, trapping, farming and construction. By 1860, there were at least 20 Sakhas living at Fort Ross before the Russian-American Company ended its North American operations in the early 1880s." - Lynnwood Today

== See also ==
- Aisyt (Ajysyt/Ajyhyt), the name of the mythic mother goddess of the Sakha people
- Kurumchi culture
- Yakutian horse
- Turkic Christians
- Music in the Sakha Republic
- Shamanism in Siberia
- Turkic people
- Yakutia
- Yakut language
- Yakut shamanism
- Yakut nationalism
- Yakutian cattle
- Yakutian Laika

== Bibliography ==
=== Books ===
- Alekseev, N. A.; Emelyanov, N. V.; Petrov, V. T., eds. (2005). В этом разделе публикуются материалы по книге "Предания, легенды и мифы саха (якутов)" [Traditions, legends and myths of Sakha] (in Russian). Novosibirsk: Nauka. pp. 12–16. ISBN 5-02-030901-X.
- Antipin, V. N., ed. (1963). Советская Якутия [Soviet Yakutia]. История Якутской АССР (in Russian). Moscow: USSR Academy of Sciences Publishing House.
- Arutyunov, S. A.; Sergeyev, D. A. (1975). Проблемы этнической истории Берингоморья: Эквенский могильник [Problems of the Ethnic History of the Bering Sea: Ekvensky Burial Ground] (in Russian). Moscow: Nauka.
- Davis, Wade; Harrison, K. David; Howell, Catherine Herbert (2007). Book of Peoples of the World: A Guide to Cultures. National Geographic Books. ISBN 978-1-4262-0238-4.
- Dzharylgasinova, R. (1972). Древние когурёсцы (к этнической истории корейцев) [Ancient Koguryeo people (on the ethnic history of the Koreans)] (in Russian). Moscow: Nauka.
- Ergis, G. U., ed. (1960). Исторические предания и рассказы якутов [Historical legends and stories of the Yakuts] (in Russian). Vol. 1. Moscow; Leningrad: USSR Academy of Sciences Publishing House.
- Gogolev, A. I. (1993). Проблемы этногенеза и формирования культуры [The Yakuts: Problems of ethnic genesis and cultural formation] (in Russian). Yakutsk: Yakutsk State University.
- Gokhman, I. I.; Tomtosova, L. F. (1992). "Антропологические исследования неолитических могильников Диринг-Юрях и Родинка" [Anthropological researches of the Neolithic burial grounds of Diring-Yuryakh and Rodinka]. Археологические исследования в Якутии: Сб. трудов Приленской археол. экспедиции [TEST] (in Russian). Novosibirsk: Nauka. pp. 105–124.
- Ivanov, V. F. (1974). Историко-этнографическое изучение Якутии XVII–XVIII вв [Historical and ethnographic study of Yakutia of the 17th and 18th centuries] (in Russian). Moscow: Nauka.
- Kochnev, D. A. (1899). "Очерки юридического быта якутов" [Essays on the legal life of the Yakuts]. Proceedings of the Society of Archeology, History, Ethnography at the Imperial Kazan University. 15 (2). Imperial Kazan University.
- Konstantinov, I. V. (1978). Ранний железный век Якутии [Early Iron Age in Yakutia] (in Russian). Novosibirsk: Nauka.
- Kozmin, Nikolai Nikolaevich (1928), К вопросу о происхождении якутов-сахалар [On the origin of the Yakut-sakhalar] (in Russian), Irkutsk
- Krasheninnikov, S. P.. (1949). Описание Земли Камчатки [Description of the Land of Kamchatka] (in Russian). Moscow, Leningrad: Glavsevmorput.
- Ksenofontov, G. V. (1977). Эллэйада: Материалы по мифологии и легендарной истории якутов [Elleiada (fables about Ellei): Materials on Yakuts' mythology and legendary history] (in Russian). Moscow: Nauka.
- Ksenofontov, G. V. (1992). Ураанхай сахалар: Очерки по древней истории якутов [Uraankhay-sakhalar: Essays on the ancient history of the Yakuts] (in Russian). Vol. 1. Yakutsk: Бичик.
- Levene, Mark; Roberts, Penny (1999). The Massacre of History. Berghahn Books. ISBN 978-1-57181-934-5.
- Lindenau, Jacob Johan (1983). Описание народов Сибири (первая половина XVIII века): Историко-этнографические материалы о народах Сибири и Северо-Востока [Description of the Peoples of Siberia (First Half of the Eighteenth Century): Historical and Ethnographical Materials on the Peoples of Siberia and North-East]. Дальневосточная историческая библиотека (in Russian). Translated by Titova, Z. D. Magadan: Magadan.
- Levin, M. G.; Potapov, L. P., eds. (1956). Народы Сибири [Peoples of Siberia] (in Russian). Moscow: USSR Academy of Sciences Publishing House.
- Nimaev, D. D. (1988). Проблемы этногенеза бурят [Problems of the ethnogenesis of the Buryats] (in Russian). Novosibirsk: Nauka.
- Okladnikov, A. P. (1955). Якутия до присоединения к русскому государству [Yakutia before joining Russia] (in Russian). Vol. 1. Moscow, Leningrad: yes.
- Okladnikov, Alexey Pavlovich (1970). Michael, Henry N. (ed.). Yakutia: Before its incorporation into the Russian State. Anthropology of the North: Translations from Russian Sources. Montreal & London: McGill-Queen's University Press. ISBN 978-0-7735-9068-7.
- Ovchinnikov, Mikhail Pavlovich (1897). Из материалов по этнографии якутов [From the materials on the ethnography of the Yakuts]. Этнографическое обозрение (in Russian).
- Pavlinskaya, L. R. (2001). Некоторые аспекты культурогенеза народов Сибири (по материалам шаманского костюма) [Some aspects of the cultural genesis of Siberian peoples (materials of shaman's costume)] (in Russian). St. Petersburg: Евразия сквозь века. pp. 229–232.
- Popov, Gavriil V. (1986). Слова "неизвестного происхождения" якутского языка (сравнительно-историческое исследование) [Words of "unknown origin" of the Yakut language (comparative historical study)] (in Russian). Yakutsk: Yakut Book Publishing House.
- Potapov, L. P. (1969). Этнический состав и происхождение алтайцев: Историко-этнографический [Ethnic structure and origin of Altai people: A historical and ethnographic essay] (in Russian). Leningrad: Nauka.
- Radlov, Vasily Vasilievich (1893). Aus Sibirien: Lose Blätter aus meinem Tagebuche [From Siberia: Loose Leaves from my Diary] (in German). Leipzig: T. O. Weigel Nachfolger.
- Richards, John F. (2003). The Unending Frontier: An Environmental History of the Early Modern World. University of California Press. ISBN 0-520-93935-2.
- de Roerich, George (1999). test [Tibet and Central Asia: Articles, Lectures, Translations] (in Russian). Samara: Publishing House Agni.
- Rumyantsev, G. N. (1962). Происхождение хоринских бурят [Origin of the Khori Buryats] (in Russian). Ulan-Ude: Buryat Book Publishing House.
- Schukin, Nikolai Semyonovich (1844). Поездка в Якутск [A Trip to Yakutsk] (in Russian) (2nd ed.). St. Petersburg: Типография Временного Департамента Военных Поселений.
- Stepanov, A. D. (2005). Самодийская и юкагирская топонимика на карте Якутии: К проблемам генезиса древ-них культур Севера [Samoyedic and Yukaghir toponymics on the map of Yakutia: genesis of ancient cultures of the North revisited]. Социогенез в Северной Азии (in Russian). Irkutsk: Издательство ИРНИТУ. pp. 223–227.
- Tugolukov, V. A. (1985). Тунгусы (эвенки и эвены) Средней и Западной Сибири [Tungusic people (Evenkis and Evens) of Central and Western Siberia] (in Russian). Moscow: Nauka.

=== Articles ===
- Adamov, D. (2008). "Расчет возраста популяции якутов, принадлежащих к гаплогруппе N1c1" [Calculation of age for Yakut population belonging to haplogroup N1c1] (PDF). Proceedings of the Russian Academy of DNA Genealogy (in Russian). 1 (4): 646–656. ISSN 1942-7484. Archived from the original (PDF) on 30 September 2015.
- Bravina, R. I.; Petrov, D.M. (2018). "Tribes «Which Became Wind»: Autochthonous Substrate in Ethnocultural Genesis of the Yakuts Revisited" (PDF). Vestnik Arheologii, Antropologii I Etnografii (in Russian). 2 (41). Institute for Humanities Research and Indigenous Studies of the North: 119–127. doi:10.20874/2071-0437-2018-41-2-119-127.
- Dashieva, Nadezhda B. (25 December 2020). "Образ оленя-солнца и этноним бурятского племени Хори" [Image of the Deer-Sun and Ethnonym of the Khori Buryats]. Oriental Studies (in Russian). 13 (4). East Siberian State Institute of Culture: 941–950. doi:10.22162/2619-0990-2020-50-4-941-950. S2CID 243027767.
- Duggan, Ana T.; et al. (12 December 2013). "Investigating the Prehistory of Tungusic Peoples of Siberia and the Amur-Ussuri Region with Complete mtDNA Genome Sequences and Y-chromosomal Markers". PLOS ONE. 8 (12) e83570. Bibcode:2013PLoSO...883570D. doi:10.1371/journal.pone.0083570. ISSN 1932-6203. PMC 3861515. PMID 24349531.
- Fedorova, Sardana A.; et al. (19 June 2013). "Autosomal and uniparental portraits of the native populations of Sakha (Yakutia): implications for the peopling of Northeast Eurasia". BMC Evolutionary Biology. 13 (1): 127. Bibcode:2013BMCEE..13..127F. doi:10.1186/1471-2148-13-127. ISSN 1471-2148. PMC 3695835. PMID 23782551.
- Ivanov, M. S. (2000). "Замыслившие побег в Пегую орду...: (О топониме Яркан-Жархан)" [Those who planned to flee to the Skewbald Horde…: (About the toponym Zharhan)]. Илин (in Russian) (1): 17–20.
- Karmay, Samten G. (1993). "The theoretical basis of the Tibetan epic, with reference to a 'chronological order' of the various episodes in the Gesar epic". Bulletin of the School of Oriental and African Studies. 56 (2): 234–246. doi:10.1017/S0041977X00005498. ISSN 0041-977X. S2CID 162562519.
- Khar'kov, V. N.; et al. (2008). "[The origin of Yakuts: analysis of Y-chromosome haplotypes]". Molekuliarnaia Biologiia. 42 (2): 226–237. ISSN 0026-8984. PMID 18610830.
- Petri, B. E. (1922). "М.П. Овчинников как археолог" [M.P. Ovchinnikov as an archaeologist]. Сибирские Огни (4).
- Petri, B. E. (1923). "Доисторические кузнецы в Прибайкалье. К вопросу о доисторическом прошлом якутов" [Prehistoric blacksmiths in the Baikal region. On the prehistoric past of the Yakuts.]. Известия Института Народного Образования. 1. Chita: 62–64.
- Strelov, E. D. (1936). "Одежда и украшения якутки в половине XVIII в. (по археологическим материалам)" [Clothing and jewelry of the Yakut in the middle of the 18th century. (based on archaeological materials)]. Soviet Ethnography. 2–3: 75–99.
- Tokarev, S. A. (1949). "К постановке проблем этногенеза" [Problems of ethnic genesis revisited]. Советская Этнография (3): 12–36.
- Ushnitskiy, Vasiliy V. (2016a). "Researchers of Tsarist Russia on the study of the origin of the Sakha people". Vestnik Tomskogo Gosudarstvennogo Universiteta (in Russian) (407). Yakutsk: Institute of the Humanities and the Indigenous Peoples: 150–155. doi:10.17223/15617793/407/23.
- Ushnitskiy, Vasiliy. V. (2016b). "The Problem of the Sakha People's Ethnogenesis: A New Approach". Journal of Siberian Federal University. Humanities & Social Sciences. 8: 1822–1840. doi:10.17516/1997-1370-2016-9-8-1822-1840.
- Zoriktuev, B. R. (2011). "Who are the Yakut Khorolors? (a contribution to the issue of ethnic identification)". Archaeology, Ethnology and Anthropology of Eurasia. 39 (2): 119–127. doi:10.1016/j.aeae.2011.08.012.

=== Census information ===
- data.europa.eu (in Latvian), data.europa.eu, 2021
- Kazakhstan (2009a). "Kazakhstan in 2009" (in Kazakh). Bureau of National Statistics. Archived from the original on 15 February 2017.
- Kazakhstan (2009b). "Official website of the 2009 Kazakh census" (in Kazakh). Bureau of National Statistics. Archived from the original on 10 August 2013.
- Kazakhstan (2009c). "Nationality composition of population" (in Kazakh). Bureau of National Statistics. Archived from the original on 23 July 2011.
- Latvia (2021). "Latvia population estimate" (PDF) (in Latvian). Office of Citizenship and Immigration Affairs.
- Russia (2010a). "Official website of the 2010 Russian census" (in Russian). Federal State Statistics Service. Archived from the original on 25 March 2016.
- Russia (2010b). "Languages spoken … by subjects of the Russian Federation" (PDF) (in Russian). Federal State Statistics Service. Archived from the original (PDF) on 9 May 2020.
- Ukraine (2001). "Official website of the 2001 Ukrainian census" (in Ukrainian). State Statistics of Ukraine. Archived from the original on 1 July 2010.

=== Websites ===
- Andreyevich, Murzin Y. (2020). "Kigilyakhi of Yakutia" (in Russian). Archived from the original on 8 May 2020.
- Kantanen, Juha (2012). "The Yakutian cattle: A cow of the permafrost" (PDF). pp. 3–6. Archived from the original (PDF) on 10 March 2020.
- Lewis, Martin (14 May 2012). "The Yakut Under Soviet Rule". GeoCurrents.
- Meerson, F. "Survival". UNESCO.
- "Yakuts", Inside the New Russia, 2018
