= Olonkho =

Series of Yakut epic poems

Olonkho (Yakut: олоҥхо, romanized: oloñxo, Yakut pronunciation: [oloŋχo]; Dolgan: олоӈко, romanized: oloñko; Russian: Олонхо́) is a series of Yakut and Dolgan heroic epics. The term Olonkho is used to refer to the entire Yakut epic tradition as well as individual epic poems. An ancient oral tradition, it is thought that many of the poems predate the northwards migration of Yakuts in the 14th century, making Olonkho among the oldest epic arts of any Turkic peoples. There are over one hundred recorded Olonkhos, varying in length from a few thousand to tens of thousands of verses, with the most well-known poem Nyurgun Bootur the Swift containing over 36,000 verses.

Olonkho was first documented by Europeans during the Russian conquest of Siberia beginning in the 18th century. Large-scale documentation epics was begun by 19th century exiles to Siberia, as well as government-funded scholars in the 20th century in the Yakut Autonomous Soviet Socialist Republic.

== Etymology and related terms ==
The term olonkho is believed to be related to the Old Turkic word ölön that also means 'saga', (cognate of Uzbek o‘lan) and has been argued to be related to the Turkish copula ol- (olmak 'to be). The Buryat epic ontkno is related to olonkho.

The term Olonkho refers to the saga/epic itself. In Yakut an Olonkhohut is the person/storyteller who performs the saga, and the verb Olonkholoo- means to perform them.

== Style ==
The language of Olonkho is unusually elaborate containing highly formulaic constructions arranged in verses.

== Performance and presentation ==
The epics were originally strictly oral, and oral performance continues today in the Sakha Republic. Poets, called Olonkohohut or Olonkohosut (Note: The difference between olonkhosut~olonkhohut reflects a sound change from /s/ to /h/ which the Yakut language has undergone from earlier record periods - modern day Yakut uses olonkhohut.) (Yakut: олоҥхоһут, romanized: oloñxohut), perform Olonkhos through a mixture of spoken verse descriptions and sung character dialogue, with the olonkhohut indicating different characters and themes through tone and melody. They contain archaic language, complex grammar, fantastic and symbolic imagery, as well as metaphor, simile, epithets, and hyperbole.

The Olonkho poems vary from a few thousand up to 40,000 verses in length. A typical Olonkho performance lasts 7–8 hours, starting at the beginning of an evening and continuing throughout the night, during which time approximately 7,000-8,000 lines of verse could be performed. Longer Olonkho may have taken over a month to complete.

The beginning of a performance starts with a poetic recitation - other descriptive parts of the epic also take this form. Dialogue is sung. Gestures and facial expressions also form part of the performance.

In the 1930s, the Yakut philologist P.A. Oyunsky published collections of Olonkhos, adapting the format to written medium by suitable for reading, dividing the poems into separate parts and songs.

== Nyurgun Bootur the Swift ==
Nyurgun Bootur the Swift is the most well known and widely disseminated of the Olonkhos. It is well known by most Yakut speakers and is considered to be a key part of the Yakut identity. It is one of the few Olonkhos to have been translated into a variety of other languages.

Platon Oyunsky's version was written in the 1920s and 1930s. Oyunsky expanded the story, adding Taas kiele ogo, a character who speaks about a core principle of the Yakut world view. This principle is rooted in the belief that there are three separate worlds - the upper world ("gods"), the middle world ("people"), and the lower world ("devils"). It is considered taboo to upset the balance between the three worlds, for example when an inhabitant of one world fails to carry out their traditional role. In Oyunsky's story, Taas kiele ogo becomes involved in the narrative because of an imbalance in the worlds, and Popova 2018 proposed that Oyunsky added the character to the tale to warn of contemporary and future threats to the Sakha.

Vladimir Derzhavin published the first Russian version in 1975, and another annotated Russian translations was published by Egor Sidorov in 2012. The first English version, a translation of Vladimir Derzhavin's Russian text, was published in the 1990s. Oyunsky's version was published in English in 2014 as Olonkho: Nurgun Botur the Swift. Other translations include: Slovak (Miloš Krno, 2012), Kyrgyz (2014), Evenki (Krivoshapkin-Nyimkalan, 1996–2003). A version for children was produced in French by Jankel Karro and Lina Sabaraikina.

A recording of the work by Yakut Gavril Kolesov was made in 1954 - and 8 hour recording with Kolesov was published by Melodiya in 1968.

=== Derivative works ===
Tuyaryma Kuo was created by Platon Oyunsky in the 1930s as a drama based on Nyurgun Bootur the Swift - it was first performed in 1937 at the Yakut National Theater. The main character, Tuyaryma Kuo, is a symbol of female beauty and character.

Prose versions of the story in Yakut were made by Elena Sleptsova-Kuorsunnaakh in 2007, consisting of 201 tales. The work has also been converted to cartoon form, in Yakut, as well as English and German voiced versions.

== History ==
=== Origins of Olonkhos and Sakha ===
The origins of the Olonkho epics is of interest not only in the context of Yakut history, but also in the wider field of comparative Turkic mythology. The Yakuts (whose ancestors are thought to originate in southern Siberia/central Asia) were broadly isolated from the rest of the Turkic world for approximately 1000 years - the Olonkhos are thought to have retained many archaic aspects of ancient Turkic myths. The ancestors of Sakha and Dolgan (the closest ethnic group to Sakha) people left their homeland probably not earlier than the 13th century since Genghis Khan and his bellicose campaigns are present in Sakha folklore and epics.

In the late 19th century, scholars held the view that the Yakuts had their origin somewhere to the south of the Lena River, an idea which informed contemporary attempts at explanation of the origin of the Olonkhos. In 1927 P.A. Oyunsky inferred that the Yakuts originated in the Aral Sea area, moving via the Transbaikal to the Lena River basin, using the Olonkhos as a source themselves. Ethnographer G.V. Ksenofontov (1888–1938) proposed a southern origin for the Sakha - part of the evidence of this was a supposed oral chronicle preserved in the Olonkho. Historian Georgiy Basharin also supported the idea of a southern origin, and suggested that the Olonkhos arose together with the northern migration, and the people's struggle for 'nationhood'.

In the 1950s A.P. Okladnikov proposed the Olonkhos represented a memory of the culture of the 'Sakha' before the northern migration to the Lena basin, and dates to a period when the Sakha's predecessors lived near the Altai and Sayans with the predecessors of the Mongols. Okladnikov claimed there was linguistic evidence for an origin of the Yakut language not in the mid Lena basin, but somewhere where other Turkic and Mongol peoples lived. He linked their origins to the western Baikal region, where the Orkhon-Yenisei script using Guligans and Qurykans lived, and suggested that the ancestors of those tribes were also the ancestors of the Yakuts - so-called "forest peoples", who lived east of the Yenisei Kyrgyz in lowlands around the Selenga River, on the banks of Lake Baikal, and around the Angara River.

In the 1970s G.U. Ergis suggested that the 7th century Orkhon Turks had folklore that corresponded to the beginnings of the Yakut's myths. In the 2000s I.V. Pukhov made a comparative analysis of the epics of the Altain and Sayan peoples, and the Yakutian Olonkho, finding similarity with the Altain Maaday-Kara epic, and commonalities with most epics of Turkic-speaking peoples in the Altai region.

Ye.M. Meletinskiy stated that the historical conditions of epic creation were those of a nomadic cattle breeding lifestyle, coupled with migrations, and conditions of rapidly forming military unions, conflicts, and other violence in a system of 'military democracy'. Ivanov et al. 2018 state that the plots, characters, etc. of the Olonkhos well match such conditions.

=== Olonkho research and translation ===
The Russian Academy of Sciences played a key role in the collection and publication of Olonkho texts - though their primary purpose was the geographic and geological analysis of Siberia they also collected information about the region's inhabitants, and their cultures and languages. Early collectors of Sakha culture included Gerhard Friedrich Müller and Yakov Ivanovich Lindenau in the 18th century. During an expedition of 1842-5 biologist Alexander von Middendorff also collated a short section of the tale Eriedel Bergen, published in 1878, becoming the first published Olonkho. A summary of Ereydeeh Buruuydaah Er Sogotoh by A. Y. Uvaroskiy was published in German translation in 1851 in the work Über Die Sprache Der Jakuten.

P. K. Maak was an official in the Bülüü region (Verkhnevilyuysk) in the 1850s and compiled the Olonkholoon Oburgu in his Vilüyskiy Okrug Yakutskaya Oblast (1887). Tsarist exile V. L. Serosevskiy compiled important information on the Onlonho tradition in his monograph Yakuti, though he did not record any Olonkhos. A. Hudyakov also compiled some Olonkhos and other oral material during his exile in Verkhoyansk between 1867 and 1874, including Haan Cargıstay, which was compiled as it was performed, and so represents the earliest useful source for the tradition.

E. K. Pekarsky was exiled to the region between 1881 and 1905, initially in Taatta (Tattinsky District), there drawing on the rich local oral tradition of olonkhohutlar (epics), algısçıtlar (prayers), and oyuunlar (games). Helped by the local populace his compilation work continued until his death, producing records of folklore that continue to be important to later researchers. An anthology of Sakha folklore Obraztsı Narodnoy Literaturı Yakutov [Examples of Yakut Folklore], the first volume of which was published in 1907, include work by Pekarsky as well as other researchers, including material from a research expedition of 1894-6 funded by gold mine owner Aleksander Mikhaylovich Sibiryakov. This work focused mainly on the central region of Yakutia, including Taatta, Amma (Amginsky District), Uus Aldan (Ust-Aldansky District), Mene Hanalas (Megino-Khangalassy District), Çurapçı (Churapchinsky District), and Cookuskay (Djokuskay, or Yakutsk). Material from other regions remained essentially uncollated due to transportation difficulties.

The publication of the series Obraztsı Narodnoy Literaturı Yakutov was a cultural turning point in the compilation and study of the Olonkhos. A Slovar Yakutskogo Yazıka [Sakha-Russian Dictionary] was published in 13 volumes between 1905 and 1930, also edited by Perkarskiy - examples of word usage drew on folklore and especially Olonkho texts.

Another exile S. V. Yastremskiy also made contributions to the study of Sakha culture. Having learnt the Sakha language he took part in the work funded by Sibiryakov, and translated full texts of Er Sogotoh, Kulun Kullustur, and Sün Caahın into Russian in the 1929 volume of Obraztsı Narodnoy Literaturı Yakutov.

P. A. Oyuunuskay also made a very important contribution to the wider dissemination of the Olonkho scholars. However, unlike previous researchers he did compile his version of the tales from the oral tradition, but instead wrote the Olonkho in his own words - written between 1930 and 1937 Culuruyar Nurgun Bootur Olonkhosu in nine episodes totalling 36,000 words. A ban on the publication of his works was not lifted until after Stalin's death in 1953 - his works were published 1959–60 in seven volumes; the fourth, fifth and sixth volumes formed the Culuruyar Nurgun Bootur Olonkhosu’na.

The Saha Dili ve Kültürü Bilimsel Arastırma Enstitüsü [Sakha Institute of Language and Cultural Research] was formed in 1934, establishing folklore archives. In the late 1930s it began field expeditions to record oral culture in the region. After the great disruption of the Second World War the institute was renamed to Saha Dilini, Edebiyatını ve Tarihini Arastırma Enstitüsü in 1947. In the 1960s and 70s focus of the institute switch to textual analysis rather than collation, Important works during this period include the Yakutskiy Geroiçeskiy Epos Olonkho - Osnovnıe Obrazı [Main Characters of the Yakut Heroic Epics - Olonkho] (V. Puhov, 1962); as well as Oçerki Po Yakutskomu Folkloru [Essays on Yakut Folklore] (Ergis, 1974).

Important later publications include Cırıbına Cırılıatta Kııs Buhatıır (1981), an Olonkho whose main protagonist is a woman; and Kuruubay Haannaah Kulun Kullustuur (1985) published in a free Russian translation alongside the Sakha with the aim of both being as close to the original as possible.

In 1997, Olonkhos were recognized as part of "Humanity's Oral and Intangible Heritage" by UNESCO. Since the 1990s Olonkho have been used by the Ministry of Education of the Republic of Sakha as teaching aids to primary school children - however some of the language of folklore (idioms, proverbs, riddles etc.) is considered too difficult, and simplified, shortened texts have been prepared.

By 2003, around 150 full Olonkhos had been collected of which 17 had been published. Around 300 Olonkhos are thought to have been known to olonkhosuts in the first half of the 20th century.

As of 2009, only one Olonkho, the Culuruyar Nurgun Bootur’dur had been translated into French and English. First translated into Russian in 1947, the French text was based upon the Russian translation, and summarised the tale. The text with Russian and English translations was published in 2002.

== Derivative works ==
- Timofey Stepanov produced a series of large scale paintings based on Ohlonkhos.

== See also ==
- Epic of King Gesar, a narrated epic found in the folklore of the Buryats, as well as in Mongolia, Tibet and elsewhere in Central Asia
- Ural-batyr, Bashkir narrated epic
- Epic of Manas, Kyrgyz narrated epic
- Epic of Jangar, Kalmyk narrated epic
- Kalevala, Finnish narrated epic

== Literature ==
- Harris, Robin (2017), Storytelling in Siberia: The Olonkho Epic in a Changing World, Folklore Studies in a Multicultural World, University of Illinois Press, doi:10.5406/j.ctt1wf4d5p, ISBN 9780252099885
- Kuzmina, E.N. (ed.), Monuments of folklore of the Peoples of Siberia and the Far East [Памятники фольклора народов Сибири и Дальнего Востока] (in English and Russian) - recordings of folklore in the original language, with texts in the original language, and Russian translation and commentary
  - elibrary.ngonb.ru (mirror)
  - Якутский героический эпос: Кыыс Дэбилийэ [The Yakut Heroic Epic “Kyys Debiliye”], vol. 4, Наука, 1993, ISBN 5-02-029749-6
  - Emel'Janov, N. V.; Rozhnova, S. P. (1995), Предания, легенды и мифы саха (якутов) [Historical Stories, Legends and Myths of Sakha (the Yakuts)], vol. 9, Наука, Сибирская издательская фирма РАН, ISBN 5-02-030901-X
  - Якутский героический эпос: Могучий Эр Соготох [The Yakut Heroic Epic “Er Sogotokh The Brave”], vol. 10, "Наука", Сибирская издательская фирма РАН, 1996, ISBN 5-02-030900-1
  - Обрядовая поэзия саха (якутов) [The Ritual Poetry of the Sakha (Yakuts)], vol. 24, Наука, 2003, ISBN 5-02-031846-9
  - г Унгер, Ф. (2008), Якутские народные сказки [The Yakut Folktales], vol. 27, Наука, ISBN 978-5-02-028691-7

Analysis

- Pavlova, O. (2018), "Mythological Image in Olonkho of the North-Eastern Yakut Tradition: Sacred Tree", Journal of History Culture and Art Research, 7 (3): 79–87, doi:10.7596/taksad.v7i3.1720 (inactive 1 July 2025)
- Nakhodkina, Alina A. (2018), "The Image of the North in the Yakut Heroic Epic Olonkho", Journal of Siberian Federal University. Humanities & Social Sciences, 11 (4): 579–589, doi:10.17516/1997-1370-0250
- Tarasova, Zoya (Winter 2013), "The Role of Women in the Sakha Epic olongkho "N'urgun Bootur the Swift" by Platon Oiunskii", Sibirica, 12 (3): 28–55, doi:10.3167/sib.2013.120302
- Burykin, Alexey Alexeyevich (2018), "Yakut-Even Folklore Correlations in Epic Genres of the Evens of Yakutia", Journal of History Culture and Art Research, 7 (4): 85, doi:10.7596/taksad.v7i4.1818 (inactive 1 July 2025)

Translations

- Oyunsky, P. A. (2013), Ivanov, Vasily; Yegorova-Johnstone, Svetlana (eds.), Olonkho: Nurgun Botur the Swift, Renaissance Books, doi:10.1515/9781898823377, ISBN 978-1898823087, S2CID 249054488
