= Zoya Basharina =

Yakut writer

Zoya Konstantinovna Basharina (Yakut: Зоя Константиновна Башарина) (born 21 May 1945) is a Yakut literary critic, philologist, and academic, known especially for her work in the Yakut language.

== Biography ==
Born in Borogonsky Rural Okrug of Bulunsky District in the Sakha Republic, Basharina graduated from the boarding school in Kyusyur in 1961, whereupon she worked for two years as a teacher. She then entered the Faculty of History and Philology at the Magadan Pedagogical Institute, from which she graduated in 1967; she then returned to her teaching career, taking a position at the Khaptagai Experimental School of the Institute of National Schools of the Yakut Autonomous Soviet Socialist Republic. Two years later she became a professor at Yakutsk State University. She defended her thesis, "Dialectics of national and international in Yakut literature", in Alma-Ata in 1990, and two years later became deputy dean of the Faculty of Yakut Philology and Culture. She defended her doctoral thesis in 2005. Basharina has taught various courses on Yakut literature and folklore, and has published over 200 scientific works during her career, many on the subject of Yakut literature; her studies have garnered numerous awards. She has also worked with others to translate various works into Yakut.
