= Isidor Barakhov =

Yakutian Soviet politician (1898–1938)

- Исидор Барахов
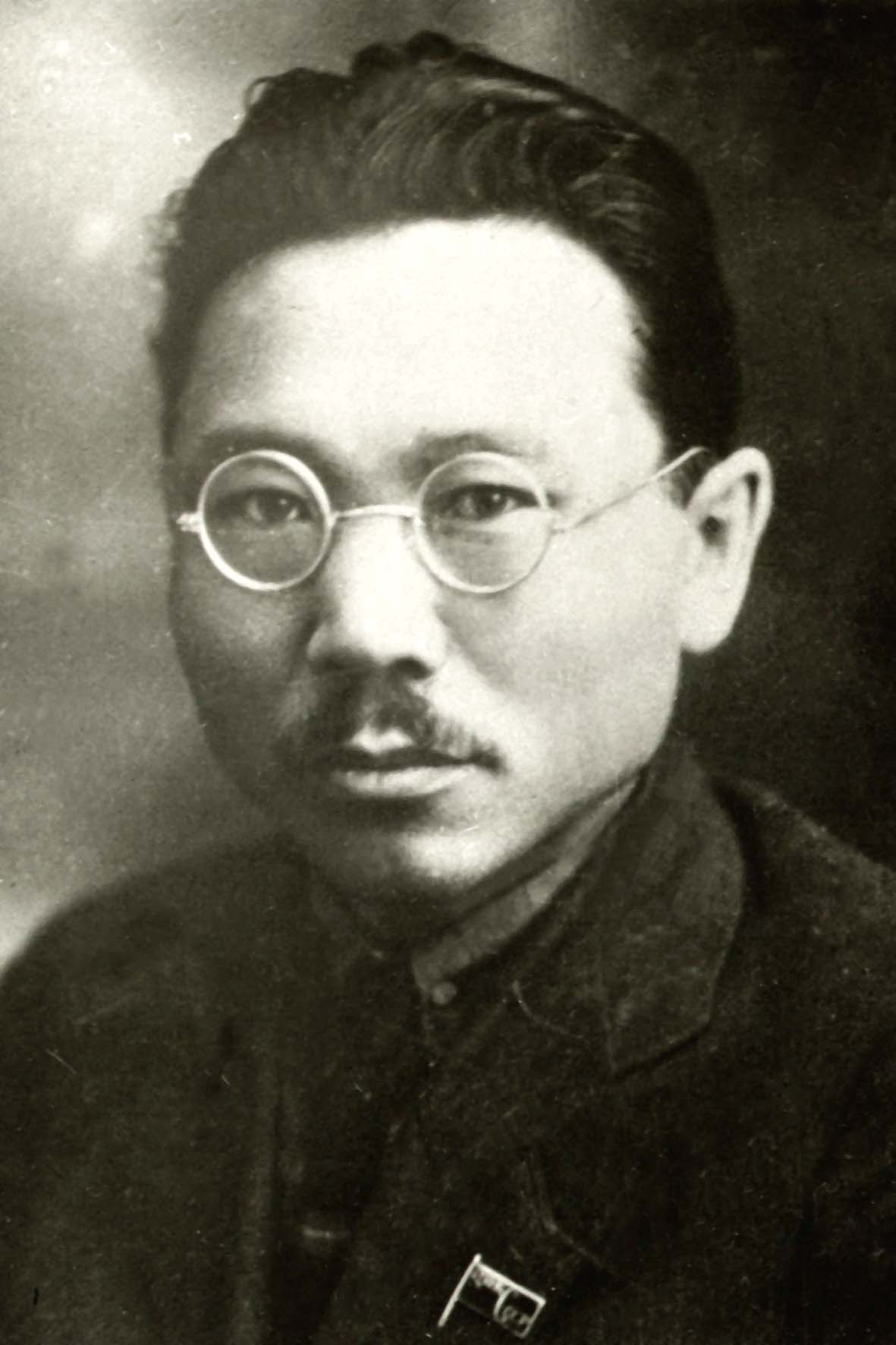
- Barakhov c. 1920s

Executive Secretary of the Yakut Regional Committee of the Communist Party of the Soviet Union
- In office June 1926 – March 1928
- Preceded by: Vasily Dyakov
- Succeeded by: Nikolay Baryshev

Chairman of the Council of People's Commissars of the Yakut ASSR
- In office 21 January 1923 – June 1924
- Preceded by: Office established
- Succeeded by: Stepan Arzhakov

Personal details
- Born: 12 February [O.S. 31 January] 1898 Kharbalakhsky nasleg, Yakutsk Oblast, Russian Empire (now Sakha Republic)
- Died: 15 September 1938 (aged 40) Kommunarka shooting ground, Moscow Oblast, Soviet Union
- Cause of death: Execution by firing squad
- Party: RSDLP (Bolsheviks) (1917–1918); All-Union Communist Party (Bolsheviks) (1918–1937)
- Spouse: Alexandra Andreevna Cherepanova
- Children: Yaroslav
- Education: Yakut Teachers' Seminary; Institute of Red Professors
- Occupation: Educator, politician

Isidor Nikiforovich Barakhov (Ivanov) (12 February [O.S. 31 January] 1898 — 15 September 1938) was a Yakutian educator and Soviet politician who served as the first Chairman of the Council of People's Commissars of the Yakut Autonomous Soviet Socialist Republic from 1923 to 1924. Barakhov, together with Maksim Ammosov and Platon Oyunsky, played a major role in the formation of the Yakut ASSR. He was executed during the Great Purge.

== Biography ==
Isidor Nikiforovich Barakhov was born on 31 January (12 February) 1898 in the Kharbalakhsky nasleg of the Verkhnevilyuysky ulus of Yakutsk Oblast, the son of a wealthy peasant cattle breeder. In 1914 he graduated from primary school in the village of Verkhnevilyuysk. During his years of study at the teachers's seminary in the city of Yakutsk he met Yemelyan Yaroslavsky and attended his revolutionary circle.

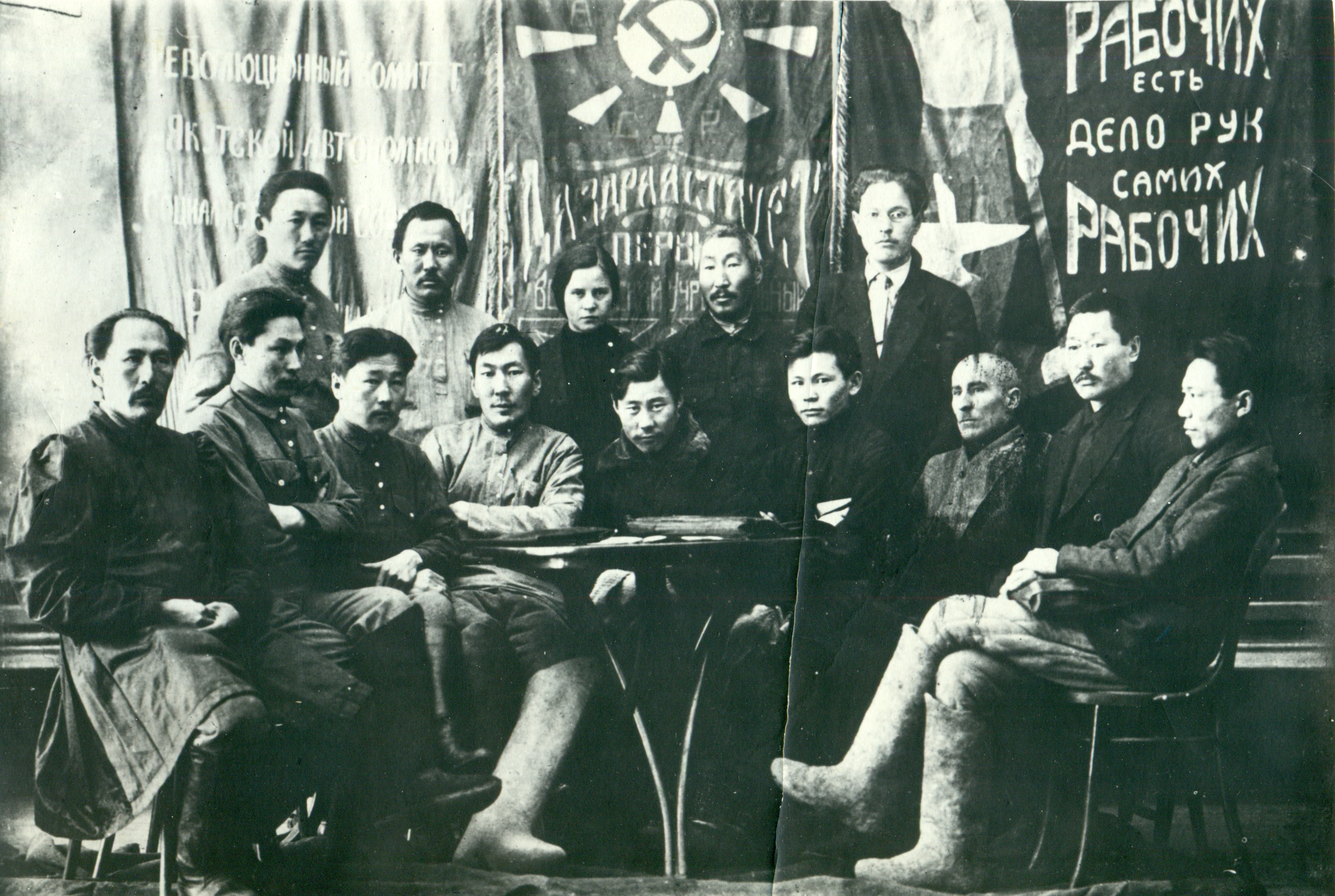
Barakhov (seated far right) at the First All-Yakut Constituent Congress of Soviets, 1923

Barakhov joined the Russian Social Democratic Labour Party in September 1917. He served as Secretary of the Yakut provincial and Vilyuy district bureau of the RCP(b) from 1920 to 1922, then as Chairman of the Council of People's Commissars of the Yakut ASSR from 1923 to 1924.

In March 1921, he participated in the 10th Congress of the Communist Party as the only representative of Yakutia with the right to vote (the second delegate, Platon Oyunsky, had an advisory vote). From September 1924, he attended courses in Marxism at the Communist Academy in Moscow. From 1921 to 1924, he worked as a secretary of the party provincial bureau and chairman of the Council of People's Commissars of the Yakut ASSR; during this period he wrote "Yakutization and the Russian Language," which questioned whether the Yakut people had in fact received the right to autonomy after the Revolution.

He headed the Yakut delegation to the First All-Union Turkological Congress, held in 1926 in Baku. He later served as Executive Secretary of the Yakut Regional Committee of the Communist Party of the Soviet Union from 1926 to 1928. In 1928-1933 he studied at the Institute of Red Professors. After graduation, he worked in the Central Committee apparatus, as deputy, then head, of the Eastern Siberia and Far East sector of the agricultural department of the Central Committee of the RCP(b) from 1933 to 1938. He was the author of scientific works on the economy of Yakutia.

He was also a delegate to the 10th, 12th, and 15th party congresses, elected as a member of the Yakut Central Executive Committee and the Central Executive Committee of the USSR.

In 1938 he was arrested on false charges and on September 15 of that year he was shot on the outskirts of Moscow, at the Kommunarka shooting ground. He was posthumously rehabilitated on October 31, 1956.

== Legacy ==
- The name "I. N. Barakhov" was given to Verkhnevilyuysk Secondary School No. 1, as well as streets in Yakutsk, Verkhnevilyuysk and other settlements.
- A new ship for the "Soviet Yakutia" project, built at the Oka shipyard of the USSR SME on October 31, 1974, was named after Barakhov.
- In February 2014, the oil tanker "Lenaneft-2004", built in 1976 by the Lena United River Shipping Company, was renamed after Barakhov.
- On April 27, 2014, a monument to Barakhov was unveiled in Yakutsk.

== Sources ==
- Пестерев В. И. (2001). История Якутии в лицах. Якутск: Бичик. p. 464. ISBN 5-7696-1606-7.
- Скрипин, Виктор. Ложные кумиры. // /«Московский Комсомолец в Якутии». Якутск. No. 10 9-16 марта (С. 14–15); No. 11 16-23 марта (С. 14–15); No. 12 23-30 марта (С. 12–13); No. 13 30 марта — 6 апреля (С. 14–15); No. 14 6-13 апреля (С. 14–15); No. 15 13-20 апреля (С. 12); No. 16 20-27 апреля 2005. С. 12–13. — Текст статьи: электронный ресурс: skripin.narod.ru (статья о том, как организовывалась Якутская АССР и о первых годах Советской власти; много сведений и про Барахова)
- Открылась выставка, посвящённая 115-летию Барахова
