= Albina Borisova =

Yakut writer and translator (born 1952)

Albina Andrianovna Borisova (Yakut: Альбина Андриановна Борисова) (born 12 June 1952) is a Yakut writer and translator working in Yakut and Russian.

== Early life and education ==
Borisova was born in Yakutsk, and graduated from high school in 1969, whereupon she took a job at the Yakut State Drama Theater. In school, she wrote Russian-language poetry, and some of her poetry appeared in a children's newspaper. As part of the requirements for her theatrical post, she translated plays by Yakut writers. In 1979, she graduated with a diploma in translation from the Maxim Gorky Literature Institute.

== Career ==
She then returned to the Yakut Autonomous Soviet Socialist Republic, taking a post as editor and assistant director of the State Television and Radio Broadcasting Academy and later becoming executive secretary of the Yakut branch of the All-Russian Theater Society. She worked as a simultaneous translator and announcer for the state theater, with which group she traveled extensively throughout the Soviet Union; she eventually translated almost the entire repertory of the theater into Russian. From 1987 until 1993, she was an editor for the children's magazine Chuoraanchyk. Since 1995, she has worked at the Bichik National Publishing House as chief editor and later, as deputy director. From 2001 until 2013, she worked for the press service for the Sakha Republic state assembly.
