= 2009 in Russia =

- Decades: 1980s; 1990s; 2000s; 2010s; 2020s
- See also: History of Russia; Timeline of Russian history; List of years in Russia

Events from the year 2009 in the country of Russia.

== Incumbents ==
- President: Dmitry Medvedev
- Prime Minister: Vladimir Putin
- Minister of Defence: Anatoliy Serdyukov

=== Governors ===
- Amur Oblast: Oleg Kozhemyako (ER)
- Arkhangelsk Oblast: Ilya Mikhalchuk (ER)
- Astrakhan Oblast: Alexander Zhilkin (ER)
- Belgorod Oblast: Yevgeny Savchenko (ER)
- Bryansk Oblast: Nikolay Denin (ER)
- Chelyabinsk Oblast: Pyotr Sumin (ER)
- Irkutsk Oblast: Igor Esipovsky (ER, until May 10), Dmitry Mezentsev (ER, starting June 8)
- Ivanovo Oblast: Mikhail Men (ER)
- Kaliningrad Oblast: Georgy Boos (ER)
- Kaluga Oblast: Anatoly Artamonov (ER)
- Kemerovo Oblast: Aman Tuleyev (ER)
- Kirov Oblast: Nikita Belykh (Independent)
- Kostroma Oblast: Igor Slyunyayev (ER)
- Kurgan Oblast: Oleg Bogomolov (ER)
- Kursk Oblast: Aleksandr Mikhailov (ER)
- Leningrad Oblast: Valery Serdyukov (ER)
- Lipetsk Oblast: Oleg Korolyov (ER)
- Magadan Oblast: Nikolai Dudov (ER)
- Moscow Oblast: Boris Gromov (ER)
- Murmansk Oblast: Yuri Yevdokimov (ER, until March 21), Dmitry Dmitrienko (ER, starting March 21)
- Nizhny Novgorod Oblast: Valery Shantsev (ER)
- Novgorod Oblast: Sergey Mitin (ER)
- Novosibirsk Oblast: Viktor Tolokonsky (ER)
- Omsk Oblast: Leonid Polezhayev (ER)
- Orenburg Oblast: Alexey Chernyshev (ER)
- Oryol Oblast: Yegor Stroyev (ER, until February 16), Alexander Kozlov (ER, starting February 16)
- Penza Oblast: Vasily Bochkarev (ER)
- Pskov Oblast: Mikhail Kuznetsov (ER, until February 16), Andrey Turchak (ER, starting February 27)
- Rostov Oblast: Vladimir Chub (ER)
- Ryazan Oblast: Oleg Kovalyov (ER)
- Sakhalin Oblast: Alexander Khoroshavin (ER)
- Samara Oblast: Vladimir Artemyakov (ER)
- Saratov Oblast: Pavel Ipatov (ER)
- Smolensk Oblast: Sergey Antufyev (ER)
- Tambov Oblast: Oleg Betin (ER)
- Tomsk Oblast: Viktor Kress (ER)
- Tula Oblast: Vyacheslav Dudka (ER)
- Tver Oblast: Dmitry Zelenin (ER)
- Tyumen Oblast: Vladimir Yakushev (ER)
- Ulyanovsk Oblast: Sergey Morozov (ER)
- Vladimir Oblast: Nikolay Vinogradov (CPRF)
- Volgograd Oblast: Nikolai Maksyuta (ER, until December 29), Anatoly Brovko (ER, starting December 29)
- Vologda Oblast: Vyacheslav Pozgalyov (ER)
- Voronezh Oblast: Vladimir Kulakov (ER, until March 12), Alexey Gordeyev (ER, starting March 12)
- Yaroslavl Oblast: Sergey Vakhrukov (ER)
- Jewish Autonomous Oblast: Nikolay Volkov (ER)

== Events ==
=== January ===
- 15 January - 2009 Makhachkala Il-76 collision

=== February ===
- 15 February - New Star incident

=== May ===
- 12–16 May - Eurovision Song Contest 2009

=== June ===
- 3 June - 2009 Krasnozavodsk tornado
- 16 June - 1st BRIC summit
- 26 June-6 July - Caucasus 2009

=== July ===
- 6 July - The Obama–Medvedev Commission is announced.

=== August ===
- 17 August
  - 2009 Nazran bombing
  - 2009 Sayano–Shushenskaya power station accident

=== October ===
- 11 October - Moscow City Duma election, 2009

=== November ===
- 1 November - 2009 Yakutia Ilyushin Il-76 crash
- 27 November - 2009 Nevsky Express bombing

=== December ===
- 5 December - Lame Horse fire

== Deaths ==
=== January ===
- 4 January - Vladimir Repyev, 52, Russian Olympic silver medal-winning (1980) handball player.
- 8 January - Irène Mélikoff, 91, Russian-born French Turkologist.
- 13 January -
  - Mikhail Donskoy, 61, Russian programmer, co-developer of the first world computer chess champion (Kaissa).
  - Umar Israilov, 27, Russian critic of Chechen President Ramzan Kadyrov, shot.

=== February ===
- 21 February - Ilya Piatetski-Shapiro, 79, Russian-born Israeli mathematician, Parkinson's disease.

=== October ===
- 20 October - Yuri Ryazanov, 22, Russian artistic gymnast, traffic collision.

=== Full date unknown ===
- Alexandra Ovchinnikova (1914–2009), road engineer and president of Yakutia

== See also ==
- List of Russian films of 2009
