= Yakut Regional Committee of the Communist Party of the Soviet Union =

The First Secretary of the Yakut regional branch of the Communist Party of the Soviet Union was the position of highest authority in the Yakut ASSR in the Russian SFSR of the Soviet Union. The position was created on June 6, 1920, and abolished in August 1991. The First Secretary was a de facto appointed position usually by the Politburo or the General Secretary himself.

== List of First Secretaries of the Yakut Communist Party ==
Name	Term of Office		Life years
Name	Start	End	Life years
First Secretaries of the Oblast Committee of the Communist Party
Maksim Ammosov	June 6, 1920	June 1921	1897–1938
Georgy Lebedyev	June 1921	March 12, 1922	1886–1975
Isidor Barakhov (Ivanov)	March 12, 1922	June 1922	1898–1938
Maksim Ammosov	July 1922	March 1923	1897–1938
Konstantin Gertzenberg	March 1923	December 1923	1888–1951
Yefim Pestun	December 1923	June 1925	1889–1937
Vasily Dyakov	September 13, 1925	January 1926	1897–1936
Stepan Arzhakov (Note: Acting)	January 1926	1926	1899–1942
Aleksandr Gabyshev (Note: Acting)	1926	June 1926	1899–1942
Isidor Barakhov (Ivanov)	June 1926	March 1928	1898–1938
Aleksandr Gabyshev	March 1928	December 1928	1899–1942
Nikolay Baryshev	December 1928	March 31, 1930	1898–1937
Nikolay Okoyomov (Note: Acting)	March 31, 1930	July 4, 1930	1897–1939
Pavel Pevznyak	October 1930	January 1939	1898–1942
Ion Stepanenko	February 1939	August 1943	1895–1965
Georgy Maslennikov	August 1943	December 1946	1905–1999
Ilya Vinokurov	December 1946	May 1951	1896–1957
Semyon Borisov	May 1951	October 1965	1911–1999
Gavriil Chiryayev	October 1965	May 9, 1982	1925–1982
Yury Prokopyev	June 1982	August 1991	1932–2003

== See also ==
- Yakut Autonomous Soviet Socialist Republic

== Sources ==
- World Statesmen.org
