= Yekaterina Novgorodova =

Russian politician (1929–2024)

- Екатерина Новгородова
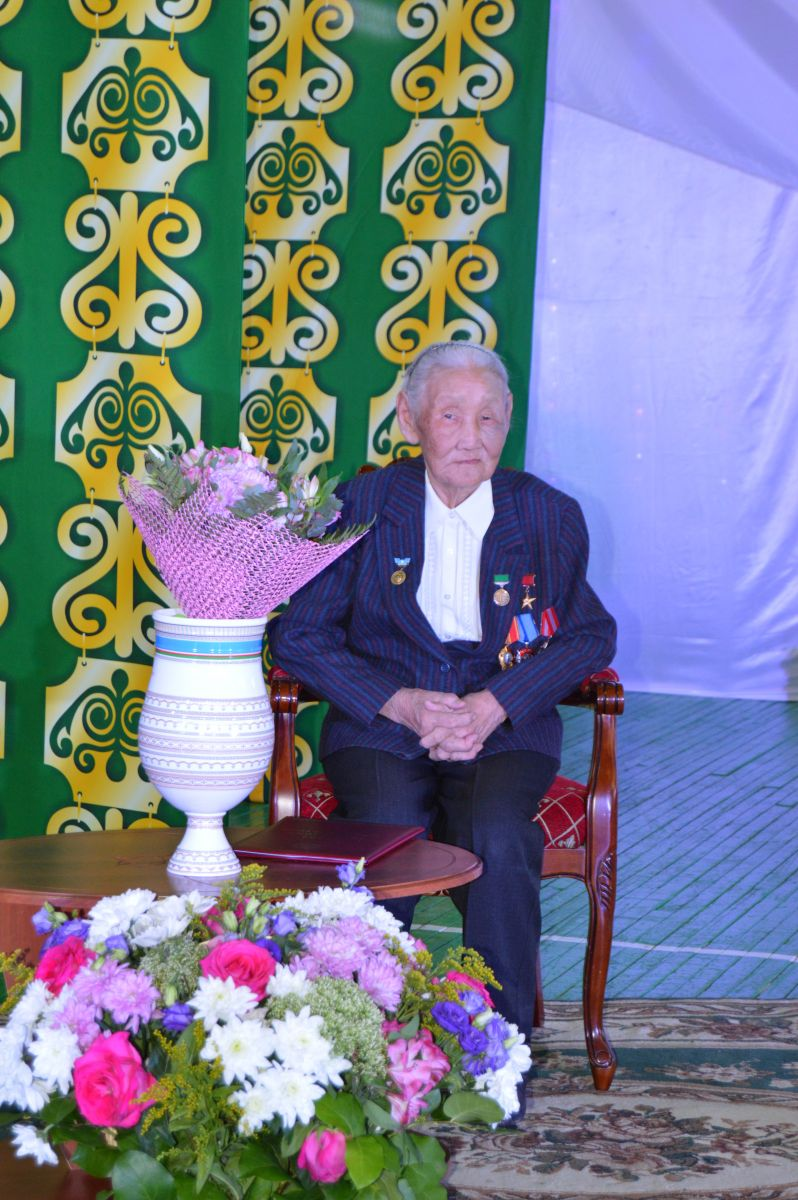

Member of the Soviet of the Union from the Yakut ASSR
- In office 1970–1989

Personal details
- Born: Yekaterina Innokentyevna Novgorodva; 13 April 1929 Kytanakh, Churapchinsky District, Yakut ASSR, Russian SFSR, USSR
- Died: 25 February 2024 (aged 94) Yakutsk, Sakha, Russia
- Occupation: Agronomist

Yekaterina Innokentyevna Novgorodova (Russian: Екатерина Иннокентьевна Новгородова; 13 April 1929 – 25 February 2024) was a Russian agronomist and politician. She served in the Soviet of the Union from 1970 to 1989.

Novgorodova died in Yakutsk on 25 February 2024, at the age of 94.
