= Sardana Oyunskaya =

Yakut folklorist, literary critic, and philologist

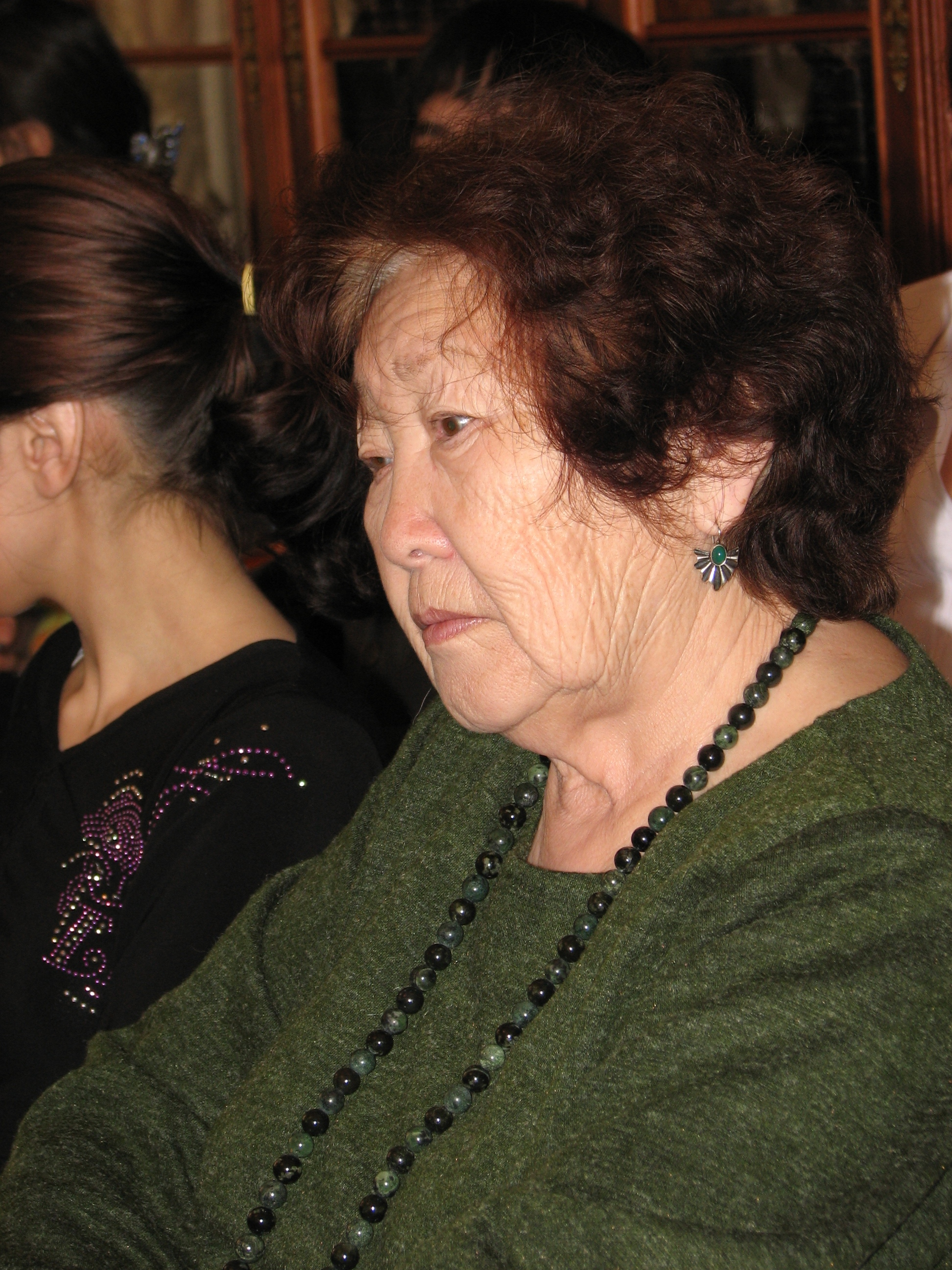
Sardana Platonovna Oyunskaya

Sardana Platonovna Oyunskaya (Yakut: Сардана Платоновна Ойунская) (September 6, 1934 – July 13, 2007) was a Yakut folklorist, literary critic, and philologist.

Oyunskaya was born in Moscow, the daughter of Platon Oyunsky. A graduate of Yakutsk State University, she began working at the Institute of Language, Literature and History in 1962. She authored a monograph on Yakut folk riddles, and co-authored publications on Yakut fairy tales and folk songs; she published numerous other works on Yakut folklore, language, and literature as well. Later in life she began to publish memoirs about her father and his associates; a book of her recollections of him was published in 1999, and republished in 2003.
