= Platon Oyunsky =

Sakha Soviet writer, linguist, statesman (1893–1939)

- Платон Ойунский
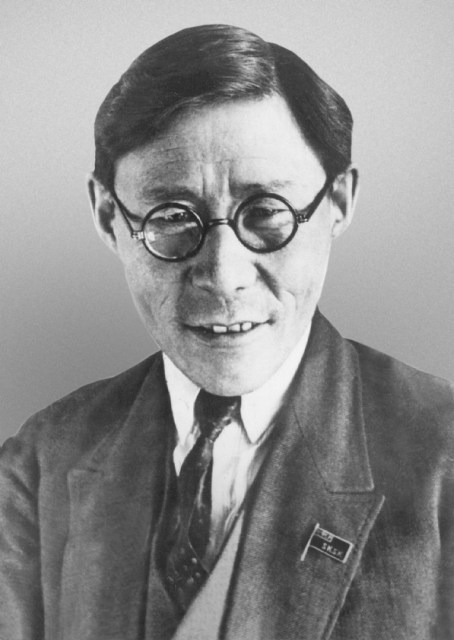

Chairman of the Central Executive Committee of the Yakut ASSR
- In office 21 January 1923 – 5 July 1926
- Preceded by: Position established
- Succeeded by: Mikhail Megezheksky

Personal details
- Born: 30 December 1893 Yakutia, Russian Empire
- Died: 31 October 1939 (aged 45) Yakutsk, USSR
- Occupation: Poet, playwright
- Writing career
- Genres: Poetry, drama, short stories

Platon Oyunsky (Russian: Платон Ойунский, Yakut: Былатыан Ойуунускай, romanized: Bılatıan Oyuunuskay; 11 November [O.S. 30 October] 1893 — 31 October 1939), born Platon Alekseevich Sleptsov, (Russian: Платон Алексеевич Слепцов) was a Yakut Soviet writer, philologist and public figure, and one of the founders of Yakut literature. Oyunsky, together with Maksim Ammosov and Isidor Barakhov, played a major role in the formation of the Yakut Autonomous Soviet Socialist Republic. He was executed during the Great Purge.

== Early life ==
Oyunsky was born in 3 Zhekhsogon nasleg of Boturuss (now Tatta) ulus. The etymology of the family name "Sleptsov" comes from the word meaning "a shaman." This became the source of Oyunsky's pen name.

== Career ==
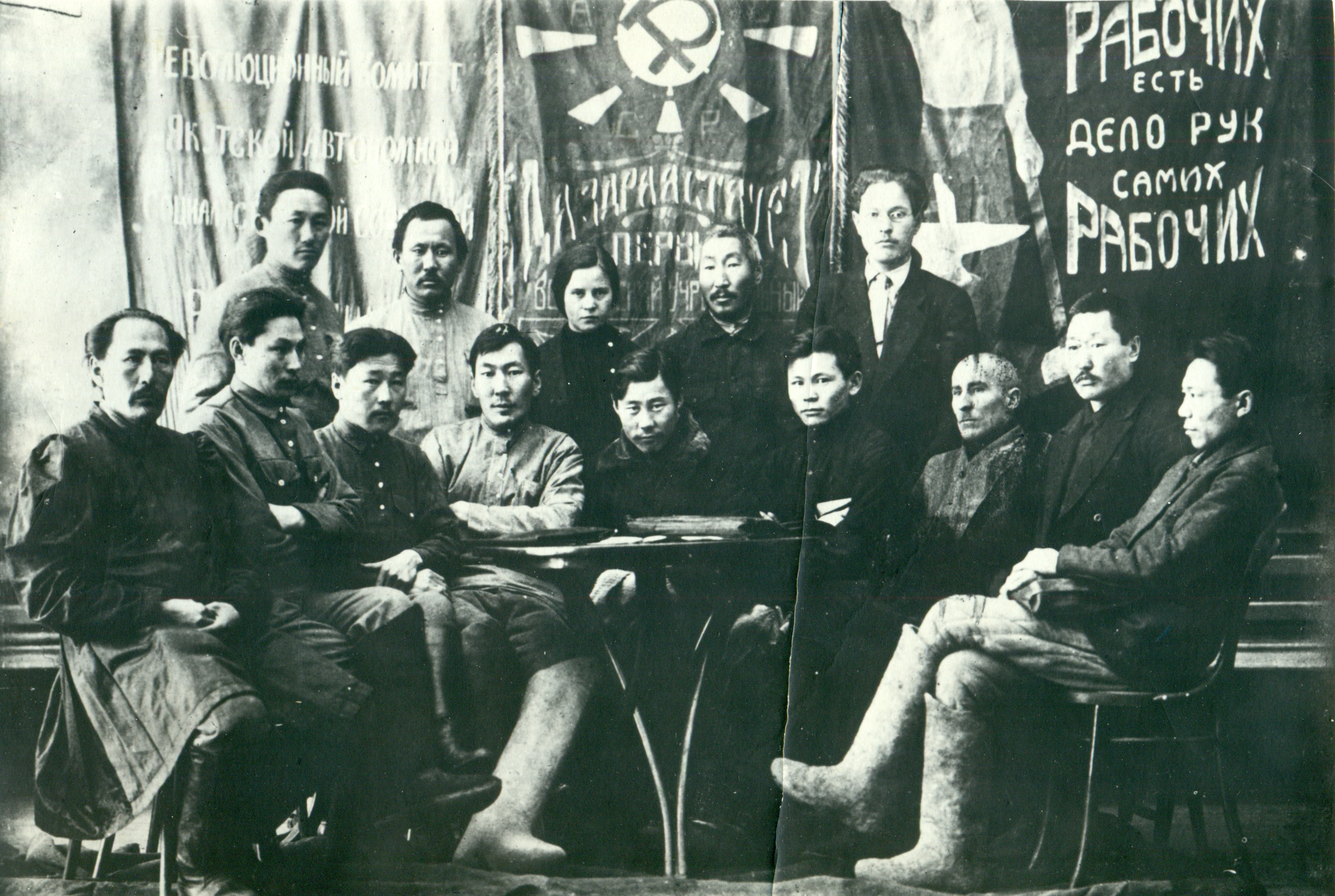
Oyunsky (seated center) at the First All-Yakut Constituent Congress of Soviets, 1923

Oyunsky became a member of the Russian Communist Party in March 1918. From 1921 to 1922 he served as Chairman of the Yakut Revolutionary Committee, and from 1923 to 1926 as the Chairman of the Central Executive Committee of the Yakut ASSR.

Sleptsov was a Soviet Yakut statesman, writer, translator and champion of the Yakut language. In addition, he was seen as one of the founders of modern Yakut literature. He took part in creating the national written language and in culturally building the modern Yakut nation. Oyunsky was one of organizers of the Yakut Autonomous Republic, the Union of Writers of Yakutia, and the Language and Literature Scientific Research Institute.

Oyunsky collected and published a number of Olonkho epic poems from the collected heroic epic poetry of the Yakuts.

== Death ==
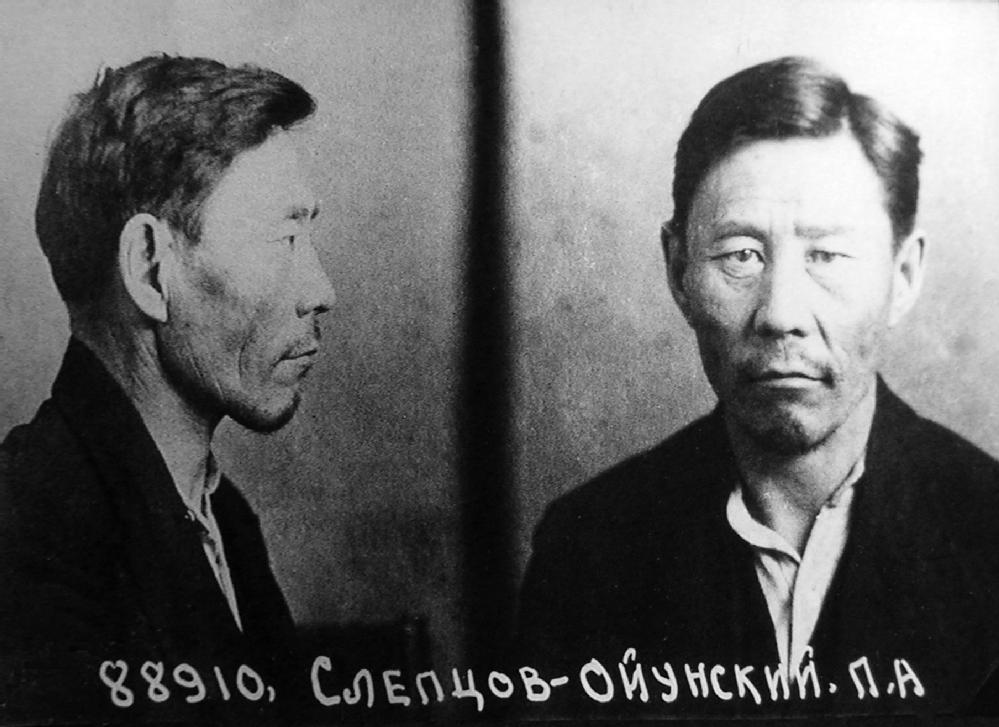
Oyunsky's NKVD mugshot, 1938

Oyunsky was prosecuted during the Great Purge, and died in prison in Yakutsk in 1939. He was officially rehabilitated on 15 October 1955.

== Legacy ==
The State Prize of the Yakut ASSR, awarded for achievements in literature, arts, and architecture, is named after him. His name also graces the Sakha Drama Theater, Yakutsk Airport, a literary museum, and a street in Yakutsk.

== Personal life ==
Oyunsky's daughter Sardana was a folklorist of note.
