= Alexandra Ovchinnikova =

Alexandra Yakovlevna Ovchinnikova (sometimes translated as Aleksandra) (Russian: Александра Яковлевна Овчинникова; 7 January 1915 – 8 June 2009), a native Yakut, served as President of the Yakut Autonomous Soviet Socialist Republic. A daughter of illiterate cattle-breeders west of Yakutsk, she became a road engineer. She was named president of Yakutia in 1963 and served until 1979. She was succeeded by Yevdokiya Nikolayevna Gorokhova. She died at age 95 in 2009.
