= Irkutsk Governorate =

1764–1926 unit of Russia

Coordinates: 52.2833°N 104.3000°E

Irkutsk Governorate Иркутская губерния (Russian)
- Governorate of Russian Empire (1764–1917), Russian Republic, and RSFSR (1917–1926)
- 1764–1926
- Coat of arms

- Irkutsk Governorate within the Russian Empire
- Capital: Irkutsk
- Area
- 743,480 km^{2} (287,060 sq mi)
- Population
  - 1897: 514,267
- History
  - Established: 1764
  - Disestablished: 1926
- Political subdivisions: Yakutsk Oblast
| Preceded by | Succeeded by |
| Siberia Governorate | Siberian Krai |

Irkutsk Governorate (Russian: Иркутская губерния, romanized: Irkutskaya guberniya) was an administrative-territorial unit (guberniya) of the Russian Empire, located in Siberia. It existed from 1764 to 1926; its seat was in the city of Irkutsk.

== Demographics ==
Population by spoken language in Irkutsk Governorate (1897)
| Language | Native speakers | Percentage |
|---|---|---|
| Russian | 375,997 | 73.1% |
| Buryat | 108,867 | 21.2% |
| Yiddish | 7,111 | 1.4% |
| Tatar | 6,981 | 1.4% |
| Polish | 3,864 | 0.8% |
| Yakut | 2,734 | 0.5% |
| Ukrainian | 2,177 | 0.4% |
| Tungusic | 2,017 | 0.4% |
| Romani | 1,094 | 0.2% |
| German | 607 | 0.1% |
| Other languages | 2.818 | 1.3% |
| Total | 514,267 | 100.00 |
