= Georgiy Basharin =

Yakut professor of history (1912–1992)

Georgiy Prokopyevich Basharin

Georgiy Prokopyevich Basharin (Russian: Георгий Прокопьевич Башарин), March 21, 1912 – April 18, 1992) was a Soviet and Russian historian, professor, public figure, an honorable scholar of Sakha and of Russia, the first Laureate of the A.E. Kulakovsky State Prize, Sakha Republic (Yakutia).

== Biography ==
Basharin was born in Sylan village, in the Yakutsk Oblast of the Russian Empire (present-day Churapchinsky District, Sakha, Russia), in a large poor peasant family. He was introduced to literacy at the age of 17 during the illiteracy eradication campaign initiated by the Soviet state. In 1932 Basharin became a student of the Yakutsk Pedagogical College and then transferred to the History department inside the newly established Yakutsk Pedagogical Institute. In 1937 he continued his education at the Moscow State Pedagogical Institute. Upon his graduation, in 1938, Basharin returned to his homeland to teach at the Yakutsk Pedagogical Institute. On September 10, 1943, he successfully defended his dissertation (Russian: кандидатская диссертация) titled "The Three Yakut Realists-Enlighteners", which analyzed the lives and work of the founders of the Sakha national literature—Alexey Kulakovsky, Anempodist Sofronov, and Nikolay Neustroev. During Stalin's totalitarian era, these three enlighteners had been accused of bourgeois nationalism and their writings were prohibited. Basharin's dissertation, published as a separate book in 1944, became a scholarly triumph over erroneous political accusations of the founders and classics of Sakha literature. The history of its appearance and the political struggle that unfolded around it became the example of courage, fight for the historical truth and decency, defense of the national pride of the Sakha people and their best representatives. In 1949 Basharin has defended his doctoral dissertation (Russian: докторская диссертация) "The History of Agrarian Relations in Yakutia (from the 1760s to mid-19th century)" and became the first ethnic Sakha to obtain a doctoral degree. His dissertation was published as a book in 1956 and republished in two separate volumes in 2003. In 1952 Basharin was accused of "bourgeois nationalism" for rehabilitating the prohibited Sakha national writers. He was excluded from the Communist Party, had his academic degrees revoked and lost his job. The accusations were dismissed in 1962. Shortly after, Basharin defended his doctoral dissertation for the second time. After his name was cleared, Basharin worked as a dean of the History and Philology Department, a Professor of the Yakutsk State University, and a researcher at the Yakutsk Institute of Humanitarian Studies, previously known as Institute of Language, Literature and History.

== Work ==
Basharin is the author of 18 monographs and over 400 scholarly papers. He devoted his life to investigating key problems regarding the socio-cultural, economic, and political life of the Sakha republic, including:

- The history of Sakha literature.
- The origin and development of agriculture in the Sakha republic.
- The inclusion of Siberia and Sakha republic in the Russian state and its significance. He investigated and developed a theory of peaceful, voluntary joining of Yakutia (Sakha) to the Russian state.
- The origin and socio-cultural development of the Sakha people.
- The problems of historiography

== Bibliography ==
=== Writings by Basharin (titles translated from Russian into English) ===
- Three Yakut realists-enlighteners. – Yakutsk: Gosizdat YASSR, 1944 — 141p.
- Culture, art, and public health in YASSR over a period of 20 years. – Yakutsk: Yakut publishing house, 1944. – 56 p.
- The history of agrarian relations in Yakutia (18th – middle of the 19th century) – Moscow: Academy of Sciences of USSR, 1956. – 428 p. – Institute of History
- The historical significance of Yakutia becoming a part of Russian state. – Yakutsk: Yakut publishing house, 1957 – 32 p.
- From the history of Yakuts adapting to the Russian agricultural tradition. – Yakutsk: Yakut publishing house, 1958. – 52 p.
- The history of cattle-breeding in Yakutia in the second half of the 19th century to the beginning of 20th century. – Yakutsk: Yakut publishing house, 1962. – 128 p.
- An overview of the historiography in prerevolutionary Yakutia. – Yakutsk: Yakut publishing house, 1965. – 72 p.
- A.I.Sofronov. – Yakutsk: Yakut publishing house, 1969. – 63 p.
- Social-political relations in Yakutia during the second half of the 19th to the beginning of the 20th century. – Yakutsk: Yakut publishing house, 1970. – 216 p.
- Ostrovsky and Yakutia. – Yakutsk: Yakut publishing house, 1973. – 48 p.
- Several questions regarding the historiography of Siberia becoming a part of Russia – Yakutsk: Yakut publishing house, 1975. – 135 p.
- The history of agriculture in Yakutia (XVII – 1917) in 2 volumes. Volume 1: Harvesting grain and potato cultures. -- Yakutsk publishing house, 1989. – 350 p.
- The history of agriculture in Yakutia (XVII – 1917) in 2 volumes. Volume 2: Vegetable growing. Technology of agriculture. Field-crop cultivation system. Social and economical importance of agriculture. Yakut publishing house, 1990. – 413 p.
- The historical fate of Kulakovsky's letter. Pp. 5 – 30. – In Kulakovsky, A.E. To Yakut intelligentsia. -- Yakut publishing house, 1992.
- Social and political conditions in Yakutia in 1921-1925. National publishing house "Bichik", 1996. – 317 p.
- In the union of free Russia. – Moscow: Art-Flex, 2002. – 383 p.
- The history of agrarian relations in Yakutia: Agrarian relations from ancient times to the 1770s. Volume 1. -- Moscow: Art-Flex, 2003. – 447 p.
- The history of agrarian relations in Yakutia: Agrarian crisis and agrarian movement in 18th to 19th centuries Volume II. Moscow: Art-Flex, 2003. – 519 p.

=== Secondary literature ===
==== In Russian (titles translated into English) ====
- Gabysheva, M.I., Platonova, K. I., Sleptsova, L. E. (Eds.). A Bibliography of the doctors of sciences of YSU: Georgiy Prokopyevich Basharin. – Yakutsk: Publishing House of Yakutsk State University, 1995. – 107 p.
- Dalan, V.S. My life and fate: Novel-esse. Yakutsk: Bichik, 2003.
- Ivanov, V.N. Contribution of Basharin into historical science. Pp. 4 –11. – In Materials of scientific conference devoted to 80th anniversary of G.P. Basharin. -- Yakutsk: Publishing House of Yakutsk State University, 1993.
- Interuniversity scientific conference materials devoted to the life and activity of Basharin Georgiy Prokopyevich. Moscow, 2003. – 222 p.
- Professor G.P. Basharin's "Three Yakut Realists-Enlighteners" book presentation materials. – Yakutsk: Publishing House of Yakutsk State University, 1995. – 58p.
- Platonova-Basharina, K.I. The outstanding people of the (Sakha) republic: Georgiy Basharin. – Yakutsk: Bichik, 2002 – 231 p.
- Platonova, K.I. & Atlasov, S.I. (Eds.). A man of outstanding determination and willpower: A compilation of reminiscences. Yakutsk: Publishing House of Yakutsk State University, 1997. – 240p.
- Soloukhin, V.A. Continuation of time: Letters from different places "Pravda," 1982.

==== In English ====
- Cruikshank, J & Argounova, T. Reinscribing Meaning: Memory and Indigenous Identity in Sakha Republic (Yakutia). Arctic Anthropology, 37(1):96-119, 2000.
- Kolarz, W. The Peoples of the Soviet Far East. Pp. xii, 194. New York: Frederick A. Praeger, 1954.
- Vitebsky, P. 'Yakut', in Graham Smith, ed, The nationalities in the Soviet Union, London: Longmans, 1990: 302-317.
