= Maksim Ammosov =

Yakutian Soviet politician (1897–1938)

- Максим Аммосов
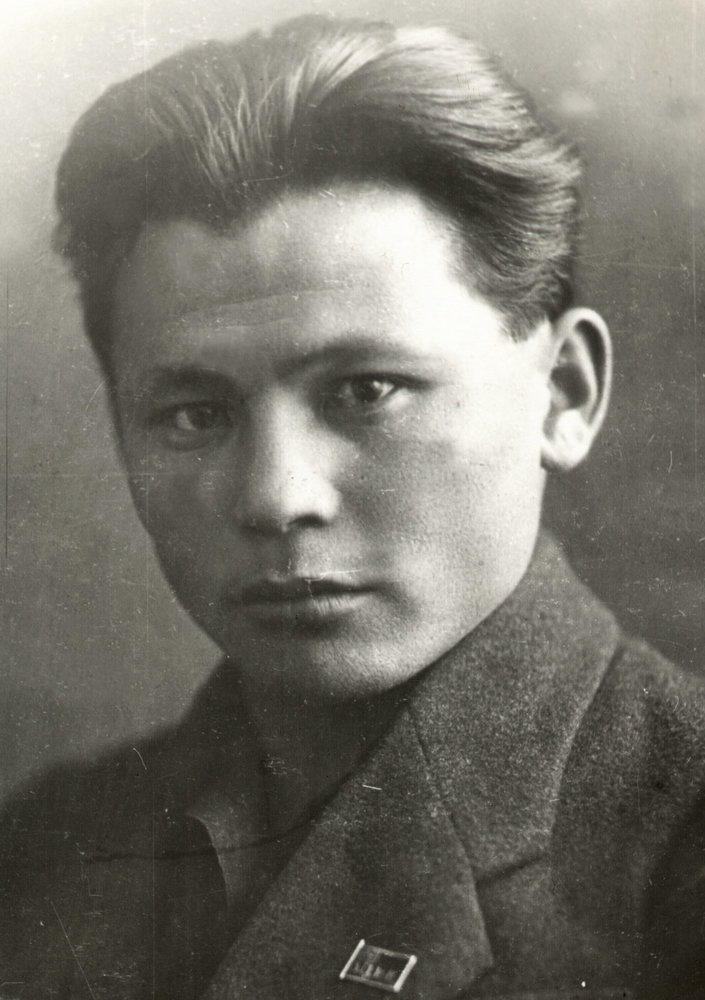
- Ammosov c. 1920s

First Secretary of the Communist Party of Kirghizia
- In office 22 March 1937 – 7 November 1937
- Preceded by: Position established (Note: Moris Belotsky as First Secretary of the Kirghiz Regional Committee of the Communist Party of the Soviet Union.)
- Succeeded by: Alexey Vagov

First Secretary of the North Kazakhstan Regional Committee of the Communist Party of Kazakhstan
- In office 29 July 1936 – 3 April 1937
- Preceded by: Position established
- Succeeded by: Sultan Segizbaev

First Secretary of the Karaganda Regional Committee of the Communist Party of Kazakhstan
- In office February 1934 – July 1936
- Preceded by: Isaac Becker
- Succeeded by: Gdaliy Pinkhasik

First Secretary of the West Kazakhstan Regional Committee of the Communist Party of Kazakhstan
- In office 5 June 1932 – 10 March 1934
- Preceded by: Position established
- Succeeded by: Izmukhan Kuramysov

Chairman of the Central Executive Committee of the Yakut ASSR
- In office 5 July 1926 – March 1927
- Preceded by: Mikhail Megezheksky
- Succeeded by: Nikolay Bubyakin

Chairman of the Council of People's Commissars of the Yakut ASSR
- In office June 1925 – August 1928
- Preceded by: Ivan Vinokurov
- Succeeded by: Nikolay Bubyakin

Executive Secretary of the Yakut Regional Committee of the Communist Party of the Soviet Union
- In office July 1922 – March 1923
- Preceded by: Isidor Barakhov
- Succeeded by: Konstantin Herzenberg
- In office 6 June 1920 – June 1921
- Preceded by: Position established
- Succeeded by: Georgy Lebedyev

Personal details
- Born: 22 November 1897 Stolby, Namsky District, Yakutsk Region, Russian Empire
- Died: 28 July 1938 (aged 40) Moscow, Russian Soviet Federative Socialist Republic, Soviet Union
- Party: RSDLP (Bolsheviks) (1917–1918); All-Union Communist Party (Bolsheviks) (1918–1937)
- Spouse(s): Natalia Dmitrievna Kulichkina; Raya Izrailevna Tsugel
- Children: Dmitry, Aelita, Yana, Lena
- Education: Institute of Red Professors
- Awards: Order of the Red Banner
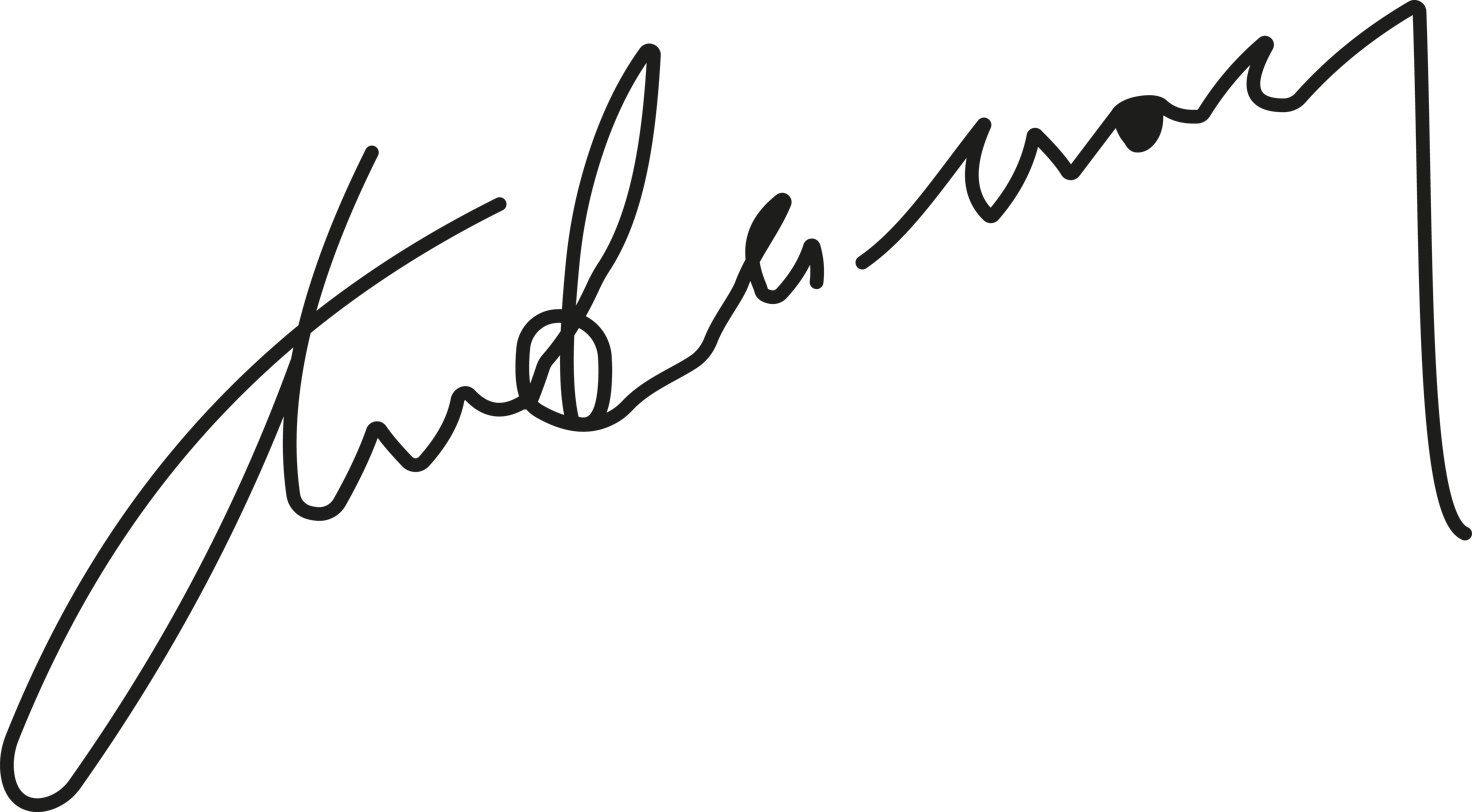
- Signature

Maksim Kirovich Ammosov (Russian: Макси́м Ки́рович Аммо́сов; 22 December 1897 – 28 July 1938) was a Yakutian revolutionary and Soviet politician who, alongside Isidor Barakhov and Platon Oyunsky, played a leading role in the establishment of the Yakut Autonomous Soviet Socialist Republic.

From 1937 he served as First Secretary of the Communist Party of Kirghizia until his removal during the Great Purge in 1938.

== Early life ==
Ammosov was born in to a poor family and was raised by his uncle due to his parents' poverty. He became involved in the revolutionary movement in 1916 and a year later in March joined the Bolsheviks.

In March 1917 he became secretary of the executive bureau of the Yakut Committee for Public Safety. From March 1918 to March 1920 he was in exile in Siberia, where he worked in the underground organizations of Tomsk, Irkutsk and Chelyabinsk.

== Soviet politician ==
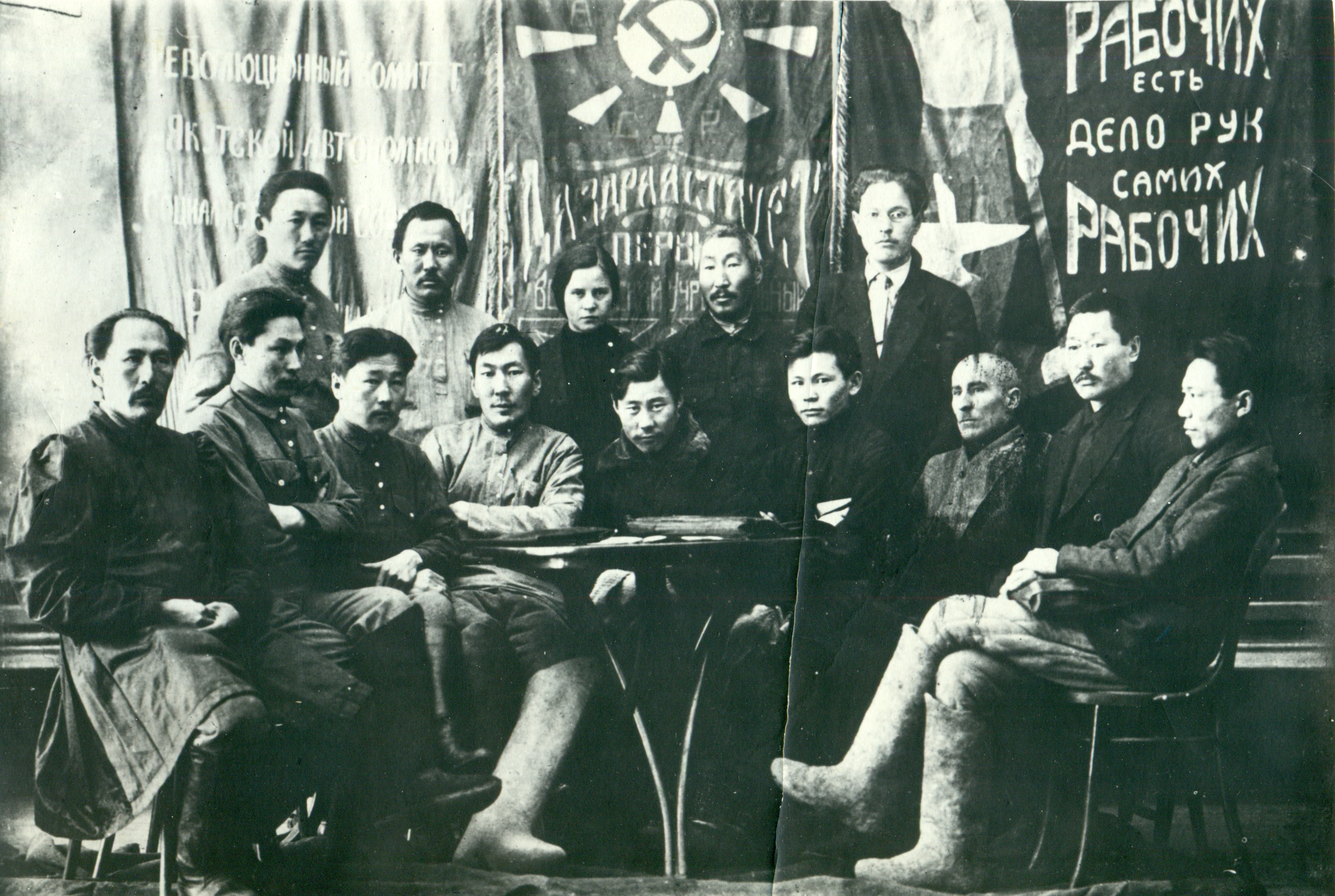
Ammosov (seated fourth from right) at the First All-Yakut Constituent Congress of Soviets, 1923

From March 1920 he was authorized by the Siberian Bureau of the Central Committee of the Russian Communist Party P (B) to establish the Yakut Regional Committee of RCP (b) and the Siberian Revolutionary Committee for the Organization of Soviet Authorities in Yakutia. In May of the same year he headed the Yakutsk District Revolutionary Committee, and in June of the same year he was chairman of the Yakutsk District Organizing Bureau of the RCP (b). From October 1921 to June 1922 he held the position of head of the Yakut section at the provincial bureau of the RCP (b). He was later sent to Moscow to grant Yakutia autonomy. From June to December 1922 he was executive secretary of the Yakutsk regional organizational bureau of the RCP (b). After that, until March 1923 year, held the post of Executive Secretary of the Yakutsk Regional Committee of the RCP (b).

From March to August 1923 he was People's Commissar of Trade and Industry of the Yakut Autonomous Soviet Socialist Republic, after which he held the post of Permanent Representative of the Republic to the Presidium of the Central Executive Committee in Moscow. From June 1925 to August 1928 he headed the Council of People's Commissars of the Yakut ASSR and from March 1927 to August 1928 he was chairman of the Central Executive Committee. From September 1930 to February 1932 he studied at the theoretical department of the Agrarian Institute of the Institute of Red Professors.

In March 1932 he was appointed secretary of the Organizing Bureau of the Kazakhstan Regional Committee of the All-Union Communist Party (b) for the West Kazakhstan region, after which he became the first secretary of the West Kazakhstan Regional Committee of the VKP (b). He held that position until May 1934. Also from February 1934 to March 1937 he was the first secretary of the Karaganda and North Kazakhstan regional committees of the VKP (b). At that time he opposed the methods of collectivization, which led to high mortality from starvation.

From March to April 1937 he held the post of First Secretary of the Kyrgyz Regional Committee of the VKP (b), then from April to June served as First Secretary of the Central Committee of the Communist Party of Kirghizia (b).

== Arrest and purge ==
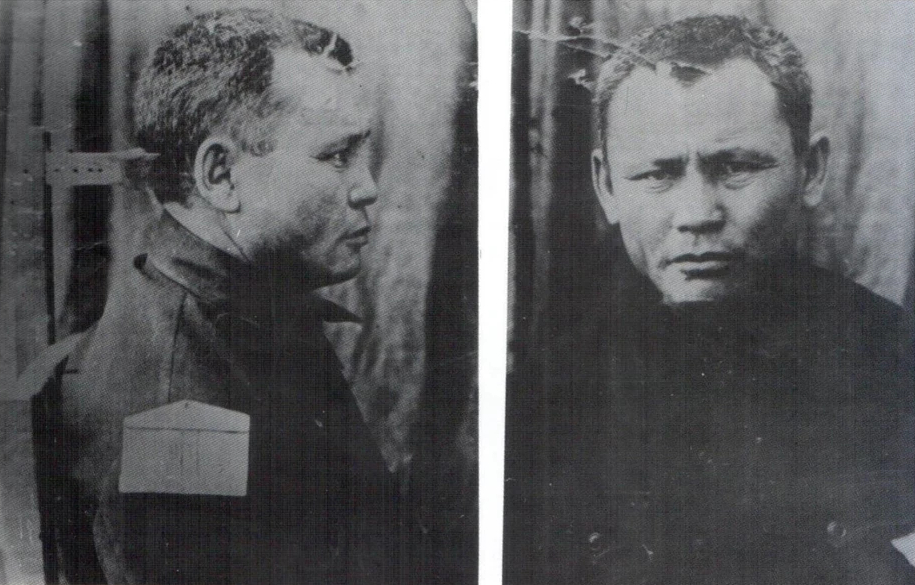
Ammosov's NKVD mugshot, 1938

On 7 November 1937, during a demonstration by the working people dedicated to the 20th anniversary of the Great October Socialist Revolution, Ammosov repeated a counter-revolutionary slogan, which was also heard on the radio throughout the city of Frunze. Semyon Lipkin, who was present, recalled that Ammosov accidentally yelled "long live the victory of fascism throughout the world!". He then corrected himself by saying “Under the brilliant leadership of the great Stalin, forward to the victory of communism throughout the world!”

On the same day, the emergency bureau of the Central Committee of the Communist Party of Kyrgyzstan removed Ammosov from all posts and raised the question of his party compliance. Subsequently, Ammosov wrote telegrams to Joseph Stalin trying to explain his mistake, but never received an answer:

I allowed a counter-revolutionary slander. Repeating the slogan “Down with fascism! Long live communism!", mixed up the words and came out with a counter-revolutionary slogan

Ammosov was arrested on 16 November 1937 in the city of Frunze. He was shot on 28 July 1938 in Moscow.

Maksim Ammosov was rehabilitated posthumously on 28 April 1956 by the decision of the Military Collegium of the Supreme Court of the Soviet Union.
