= Yakutsk Oblast =

Former oblast of the Russian Empire (1805–1920)

Yakutsk Oblast Якутская область (Russian)
- Oblast of Russian Empire (1805–1917), Russian Republic, and RSFSR (1918–1920)
- 1805–1920
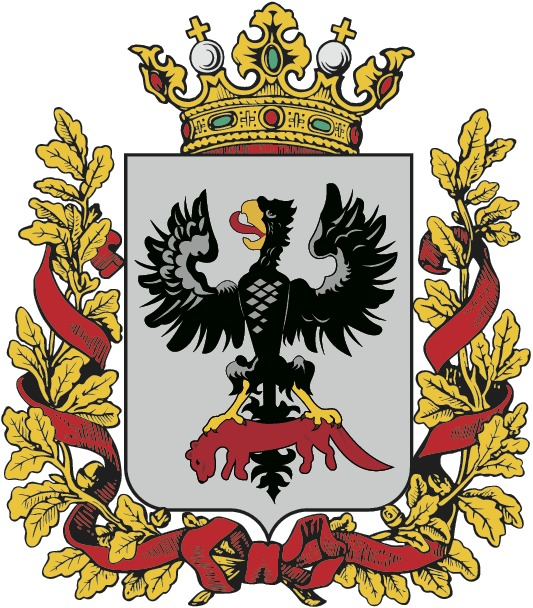
- Coat of arms

- Yakutsk Oblast within the Russian Empire
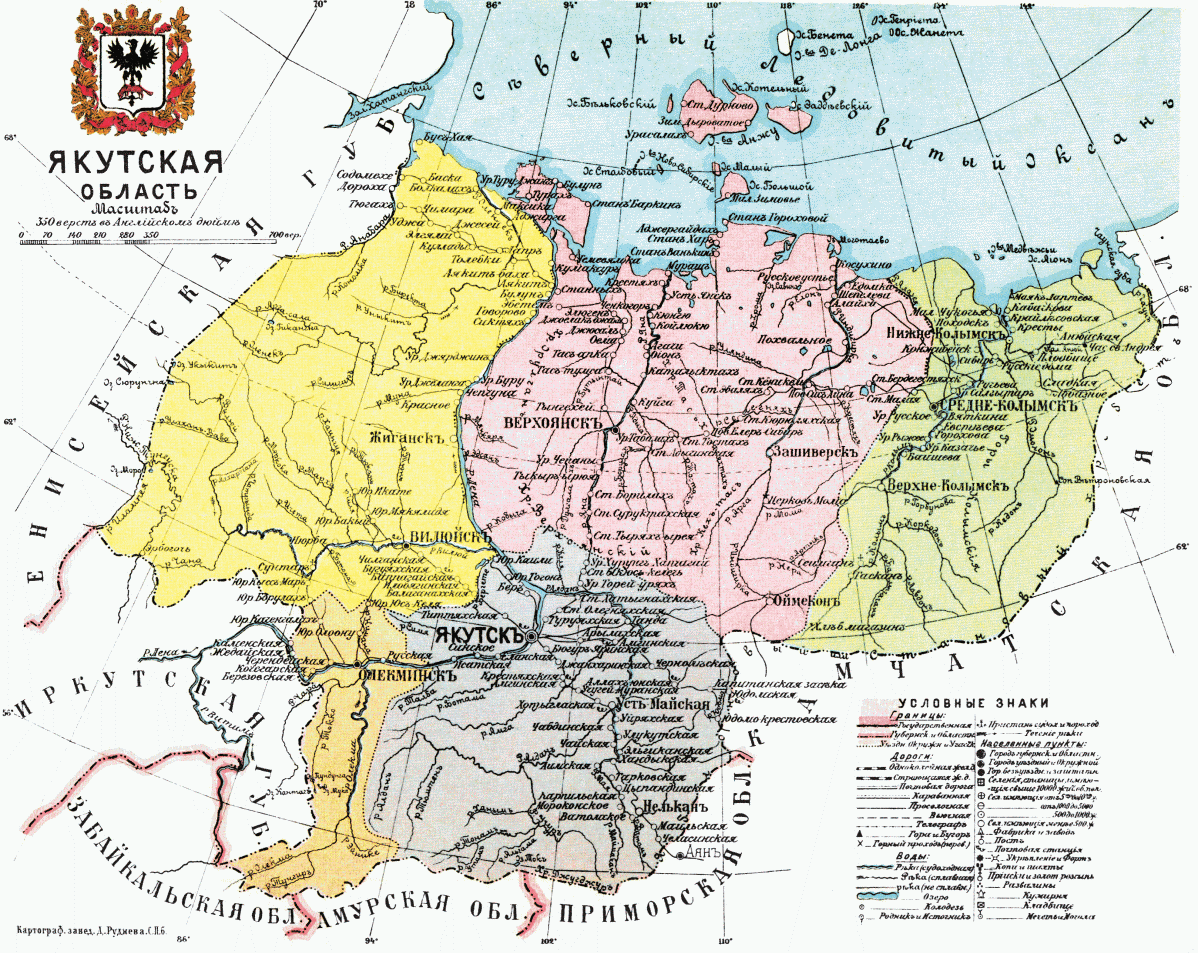
- Capital: Yakutsk
- Area
- 3,489,689 km^{2} (1,347,376 sq mi)
- Population
  - 1897: 269,880
- Government
  - Type: Oblast
- Historical era: 19th century
  - Established: 1805
  - Disestablished: 1920
| Preceded by | Succeeded by |
| Irkutsk Governorate | Yakut ASSR |
- Today part of: Sakha Republic

Yakutsk Oblast (Russian: Якутская область) is a historical oblast (province) within the Russian Empire and the RSFSR (until 1920). It corresponds with the modern day Sakha Republic. The administrative center was Yakutsk.

== Geography ==
The region was located between 54° and 73° N latitude and 103° and 171° E longitude. It was bordered to the north by the Arctic Ocean and to the west by the Yeniseysk Governorate.

In the southwest, Yakutsk Oblast bordered the Irkutsk Governorate; in the south, the Amur Oblast; in the southeast, the Primorskaya Oblast; and in the east, the Kamchatka Oblast. The area of Yakutsk Oblast, according to the calculations of Ivan Strelbitsky, was 3,489,689 square versts (about 368 million dessiatinas).

In terms of area, Yakutsk Oblast accounted for one-third of all Siberia and two-thirds of European Russia; it was the most extensive of all the oblasts and governorates of the Russian Empire. Despite several scientific expeditions, it remained sparsely explored.

== History ==
After the founding of Yakutsk in 1632, the need arose to administratively assign the remote territories of Yakutia to the Russian state. In 1638, the Yakutsk uezd was formed.

In 1775, the Yakutsk uezd was transformed into the Yakutsk Province, and in 1784, it became the Yakutsk Region of the Irkutsk Governorate.

In 1805, the Yakutsk Oblast was separated from the Irkutsk Governorate.

According to the "Institution for the Administration of the Siberian Provinces", approved in 1822, the Yakutsk Oblast was divided into five uezds: Verkhoyansk, Vilyuisky, Olekminsky, Srednekolymsky, and Yakutsky.

On 31 October 1857, the Udsky Okrug was transferred from the Yakutsk Oblast to the Primorskaya Oblast.

On 20 April 1920, by decision of the Siberian Revolutionary Committee (Sibrevkom), the Yakutsk Oblast was annexed to the Irkutsk Governorate as a special region. On 21 August 1920, Sibrevkom restored the administrative independence of Yakutia as a province. On 27 April 1922, the Yakut Autonomous Soviet Socialist Republic was formed as part of the RSFSR, which included the Yakutsk Oblast but excluded the region of Lower Tunguska (which became part of the Kirensky uezd of the Irkutsk Governorate), the Khatanga-Anabar uezd of the Yeniseysk Governorate, the Olekminsk-Suntar volost of the Kirensky uezd of the Irkutsk Governorate, and all islands in the Arctic Ocean located between meridians 84° and 140½° east longitude. Currently, most of this territory composes the Republic of Sakha (Yakutia).

=== Heraldry ===
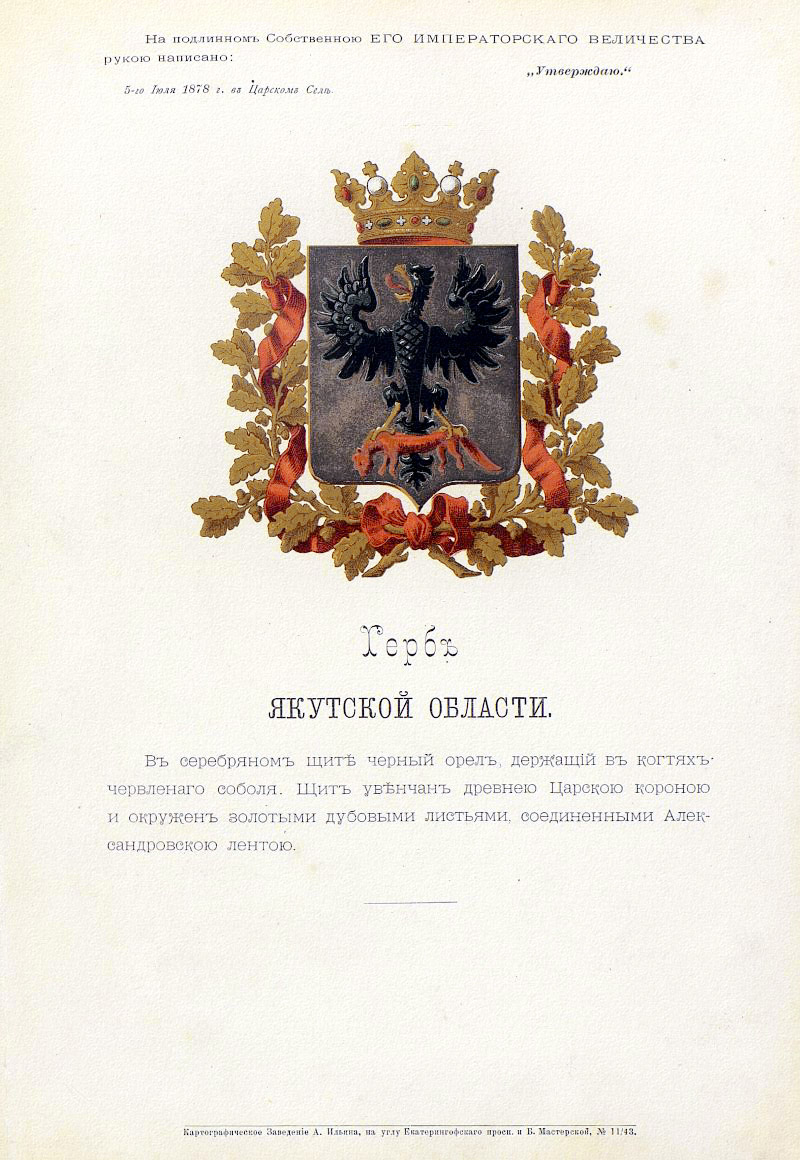
Coat of arms of the oblast with an official description, approved by Alexander II (1878)

The coat of arms of the Yakutsk Oblast, created based on a reworking of the city coat of arms of Yakutsk, was approved by Emperor Alexander II on 5 July 1878: "In a silver shield, a black eagle holding a scarlet sable in its claws. The shield is decorated with the Ancient Royal Crown and surrounded by golden oak leaves connected by the Alexander Ribbon."

== Demographics ==
In 1900, the population of the Yakutsk Oblast was 262,703 (134,134 men and 128,569 women). This included 21,045 Russians, along with a small number of representatives from other nationalities (Russian subjects), 224,110 Yakuts, 17,539 other traditional local nationalities, and 9 foreigners.

There were 96 women per 100 men in the Yakutsk Oblast. The disproportion was particularly pronounced among the military class: in the regular army and among Cossacks, there were 33 women per 100 men; among exiles, there were 40 women per 100 men.

There were 256,737 Orthodox Christians, 193 Catholics, 2 Armenian-Apostolic, 23 Protestants, 1,731 schismatics and sectarians (including 1,240 Old Believers), 510 Jews, 1,896 Muslims, and 1,610 adherents of traditional beliefs.

=== National composition ===
The composition of the population of the Yakutsk Oblast was predominantly Yakuts (91.5%), followed by Russians (7.5%), and representatives of other nationalities (1%).

The most numerous people in the oblast were the Yakuts. The Russians who lived on the Olenka, Yana, Aldan, Indigirka, and Kolyma rivers almost isolated themselves, partly forgot their language, and changed their way of life. Their appearance changed due to marriages with local residents, and their proficiency in the Russian language was quite low.

In 1900, the Yakutsk Oblast was freed from the placement of exiles, except for those convicted of crimes against religion and the state. Prior to the enactment of this law, up to 200 repeat offenders were sentenced annually.

The Skoptsy brought considerable benefit to the local population and the entire region, developing agricultural knowledge in it.

The Doukhobors settled 20 versts from the village of Amginskoye on the Magon (Magan) tract near Yakutsk and formed two villages.

Unlike the Yakuts, other local residents such as Tungus (Evenks), Evens, Yukaghirs, and Chuvans belong to Mongolic tribes. In 1889, a widespread smallpox outbreak exterminated all the Koryaks and a significant number of Chuvans and Yukaghirs.

Composition of Yakutsk Oblast in 1897:

| Uezd | Yakuts | Russians | Tungusic-Manchurian peoples | Yukaghir | Chukchi | Tatar |
|---|---|---|---|---|---|---|
| Entire oblast | 82.1% | 11.3% | 4.3% | — | — | — |
| Verkhoyansky | 81% | 5.3% | 10.5% | 2.9% | — | — |
| Vilyuisky | 93.% | 1.3% | 5.6% | — | — | — |
| Kolyma | 43.3% | 17.9% | 12.1% | 6.7% | 19.7% | — |
| Olekminsky | 36.4% | 54.5% | 2.4% | — | — | 3.0% |
| Yakutsk | 90.6% | 5.3% | 3.2% | — | — | — |

== Authorities ==
=== Administrative divisions ===
At the beginning of the 20th century, the oblast included five uezds:

| № | Uezd (Okrugs) | Center | Coat of arms | Area, Verst² | Population (1897) |
|---|---|---|---|---|---|
| 1 | Verkhoyansk | Verkhoyansk (354 people) | | 947,085 | 14,259 |
| 2 | Vilyuysky | Vilyuysk (611 people) | | 883,402 | 67,942 |
| 3 | Kolyma | Sredne-Kolymsk (538 people) | | 604,756 | 7,885 |
| 4 | Olyokminsky | Olyokminsk (1,144 people) | | 330,159 | 36,227 |
| 5 | Yakutsk | Yakutsk (6,535 people) | | 719,287 | 143,567 |

The districts were divided into police stations, the districts into volosts and rural communities, and the foreign areas into uluses with naslegs and settlements. In total, there were twelve police stations in the region, eight Russian volosts and one foreign volost, with 169 populated areas (including 99 foreign and 12 inhabited by exiled eunuchs), 15 Yakut uluses with 251 naslegs (villages), and 36 clans of other foreigners.

Yakutsk and four districts were officially considered cities: Olekminsk, Viluysk, Verkhoyansk, and Srednekolymsk.

=== Administrative divisions on 1 March 1921 ===
1. Verkhoyansk district (Verkhoyansk city):

- Due to the ongoing Russian Civil War, there was no data on volosts.

2. Vilyuysky district (city of Vilyuysk):

- Verkhne-Vilyuiskaya volost;
- Kachai parish;
- Markhinskaya volost;
- Mastakh parish;
- Nyurba volost;
- Sredne-Vilyuiskaya volost;
- Suntar parish;
- Udyugey parish;
- Khochin volost.

3. Kamchatka district:

- Due to the ongoing Russian Civil War, there was no data on volosts.

4. Kolyma district (city of Sredne-Kolymsk):

- Due to the ongoing Russian Civil War, there was no data on volosts.

5. Olekminsky district (Olyokminsk city):

- Abaginsky independent society;
- Amginsko-Olyokma independent society;
- Biryukskaya volost;
- Kalysh independent society;
- Kolyma Independent Society;
- Neryukhteiskaya volost;
- Nokhtuyskaya volost;
- Malzegar Independent Society;
- Chemur independent society.

6. Okhotsk district:

- Due to the ongoing Russian Civil War, there was no data on volosts.

7. Yakutsk county (city of Yakutsk):

- Due to the ongoing Russian Civil War, there was no data on volosts.

=== Governors (civil governors, governors of the Yakutsk Oblast) ===
| Full name | Title and rank | Term |
|---|---|---|
| Konstantin Nikiforovich Grigoriev | State councilor | 1 November 1850 – 9 February 1856 |
| Nikolai Fyodorovich Skryabin | State councilor, cavalier, manager (civil governor) of the Yakutsk Oblast | 9 February 1856 – 26 March 1857 |
| Julius Ivanovich Stubendorf | State councilor | 26 March 1857—30 November 1862 |
| Nikolai Fyodorovich Skryabin | State councilor, cavalier, manager (civil governor) of the Yakutsk Oblast (repeatedly) | 30 November 1862 – 1 July 1865 |
| Apollon Davydovich Lokhvitsky | State councilor | 1 July 1865 – 14 August 1868 |
| Vasily Konstantinovich Bodisko | State councilor | 23 November 1868 – 24 December 1869 |
| Viktor Pavlovich De Witte | Colonel, (approved with the title of major general 2 August 1874) | 24 December 1869—12 July 1876 |
| Georgy Fedorovich Chernyaev | Colonel, (promoted to major general on 27 January 1877) | 12 July 1876 – 31 May 1885 |
| Konstantin Nikolaevich Svetlitsky | Colonel, (promoted to major general 30 August 1887 | 10 October 1885 – 12 May 1889 |
| Vladimir Zakharovich Kolenko | State councilor | 12 May 1889 – 26 March 1892 |
| Vladimir Nikolaevich Skripitsyn | State councilor | 23 April 1892 – 29 August 1903 |
| Viktor Nikolaevich Bulatov | State councilor | 29 August 1903 – 25 November 1906 |
| Ivan Ivanovich Kraft | State councilor | 25 November 1906 – 1913 |
| Rudolf Evaldovich Witte | State councilor | 1913–1917 |

=== Lieutenant Governors ===
| Full naaem | Title and rank | Term |
|---|---|---|
| Vasily Lvovich Priklonsky | Privy Councilor | 1 July 1883 – 24 November 1883 |
| Pavel Vasilievich Ilyin | State councilor | 24 November 1883 – 23 August 1888 |
| Pavel Petrovich Ostashkin | Court councilor (College councilor) | 23 August 1888 – March 1894 |
| Alexey Maksimovich Lavrov | State councillor | 26 May 1894 – 11 June 1895 |
| Alexander Rostislavovich Aleev | State councilor | 6 July 1895 – 26 August 1898 |
| Alexander Konstantinovich Miller | State councilor | 2 September 1898 – 4 July 1903 |
| Nikolai Nikolaevich Chaplin | Collegiate advisor | 4 July 1903 – 3 December 1904 |
| Alexander Nikolaevich Leontyev | State councilor | 3 December 1904 – 21 January 1905 |
| Alexander Alexandrovich Vashchenko | State councilor | 21 January 1906 – 28 September 1909 |
| Vladimir Alexandrovich Mishin | State councilor | 28 September 1909 – 4 June 1912 |
| Alexander Petrovich Naryshkin | State councilor | 4 June 1912 – 1914 |

== Literature ==
- ЭСБЕ: Якутская область
- Памятная книжка Якутской области на 1863 год. СПб.1864,сс.6; 115.
- Административно-политическое строение Союза ССР: (материалы о территориальных преобразованиях с 1917 года по 1 июля 1925 года) / С. И. Сулькевич, консультант Адм. Комис. ВЦИК. — Ленинград: Государственное издательство, 1926. 300 с.: таблицы — Перечень республик, областей и губерний с данными о площадях и населении по исчислению ЦСУ на 1 января 1925 года.
- Список губерний, уездов и волостей Сибири на 1 марта 1921 года; Информационно инструкторский политотдел Отдела Управления Сибревкома; Государственное издательство Сибирское областное отделение; г. Омск; ст. 20.
