= Yakut Autonomous Soviet Socialist Republic =

Autonomous republic within the Soviet Union

Coordinates: 62.0333°N 129.7333°E

Yakut Autonomous Soviet Socialist Republic Якутская Автономная Советская Социалистическая Республика (Russian) Саха автономнай сэбиэскэй социалистическэй республиката (Yakut)
- ASSR of the Russian SFSR; Republic of the Russian Federation
- 1922–1992
- Flag (1978–1990) Emblem (1978–1990)

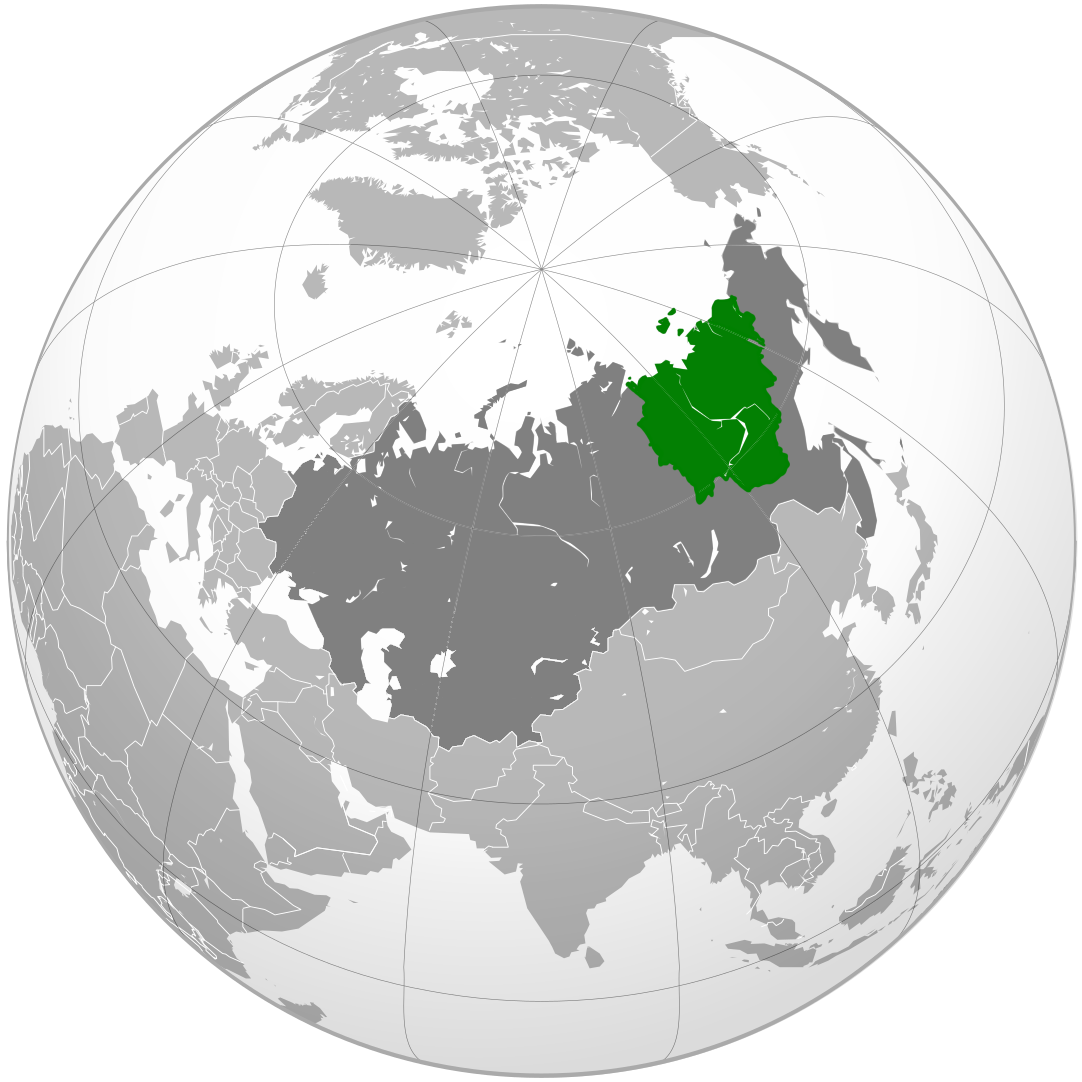
- Map of Yakut ASSR (Green) within USSR (Dark Grey)
- Capital: Yakutsk
- Demonym: Yakut; Yakutian
- Government
- First Secretary
  - 1920–1921 (first): Maksim Ammosov
  - 1982–1991 (last): Yuri Prokopyev
- Chairman of the Council of People's Commissars
  - 1923–1924 (first): Isidor Barakhov
  - 1990–1992 (last): Kliment Ivanov
- History
  - Established: 27 April 1922
  - Sovereignty declared (Renamed to the Yakut SSR): 27 September 1990
  - Renamed to the Republic of Sakha (Yakutia): 21 April 1992
Preceded by	Succeeded by
Yakutsk Oblast	Sakha Republic

The Yakut Autonomous Soviet Socialist Republic (Russian: Якутская Автономная Советская Социалистическая Республика, romanized: Yakutskaya Avtonomnaya Sovetskaya Sotsialisticheskaya Respublika; Yakut: Саха автономнай сэбиэскэй социалистическэй республиката, romanized: Saxa avtonomnay sebieskey sotsialistiçeskey respublikata (Note: In the Novgorodov Alphabet: saqa aptanꭣmnaj sebꭡskej sessꭡli:skej ꭢrꭢspy:bylykete)), also known as Soviet Sakha, Soviet Yakutia or the Yakut ASSR (Russian: Якутская АССР, Yakutskaya ASSR), was an autonomous republic of the Russian SFSR within the Soviet Union.

== History ==
The Yakut ASSR was formed as part of the RSFSR on 27 April 1922, during the Yakut revolt. It comprised the territory of the Yakutsk Oblast, though excluding the Nizhnyaya Tunguska district, which became part of the Kirensky district of the Irkutsk Governorate. The Republic also included the Khatango-Anabar district of the Yeniseysk Governorate, the Olekminsko-Suntarskaya volost of the Kirensky district of the Irkutsk Governorate, and all the islands of the Arctic Ocean located between the meridians of 84° and 140½° east longitude. It became the Sakha Republic on 21 April 1992.

Maksim Ammosov, together with Platon Oyunsky and Isidor Barakhov, played a major role in the formation of the Yakut Autonomous Republic. Ammosov served as the first Executive Secretary of the Yakut Communist Party, Oyunsky was the first Chairman of the Central Executive Committee, and Barakhov was the first Chairman of the Council of People's Commissars.

== See also ==
- Yakut Regional Committee of the Communist Party of the Soviet Union
