= 2023 Sakha head election =

2023 Sakha Republic head election
- 8–10 September 2023
- Turnout: 48.37%
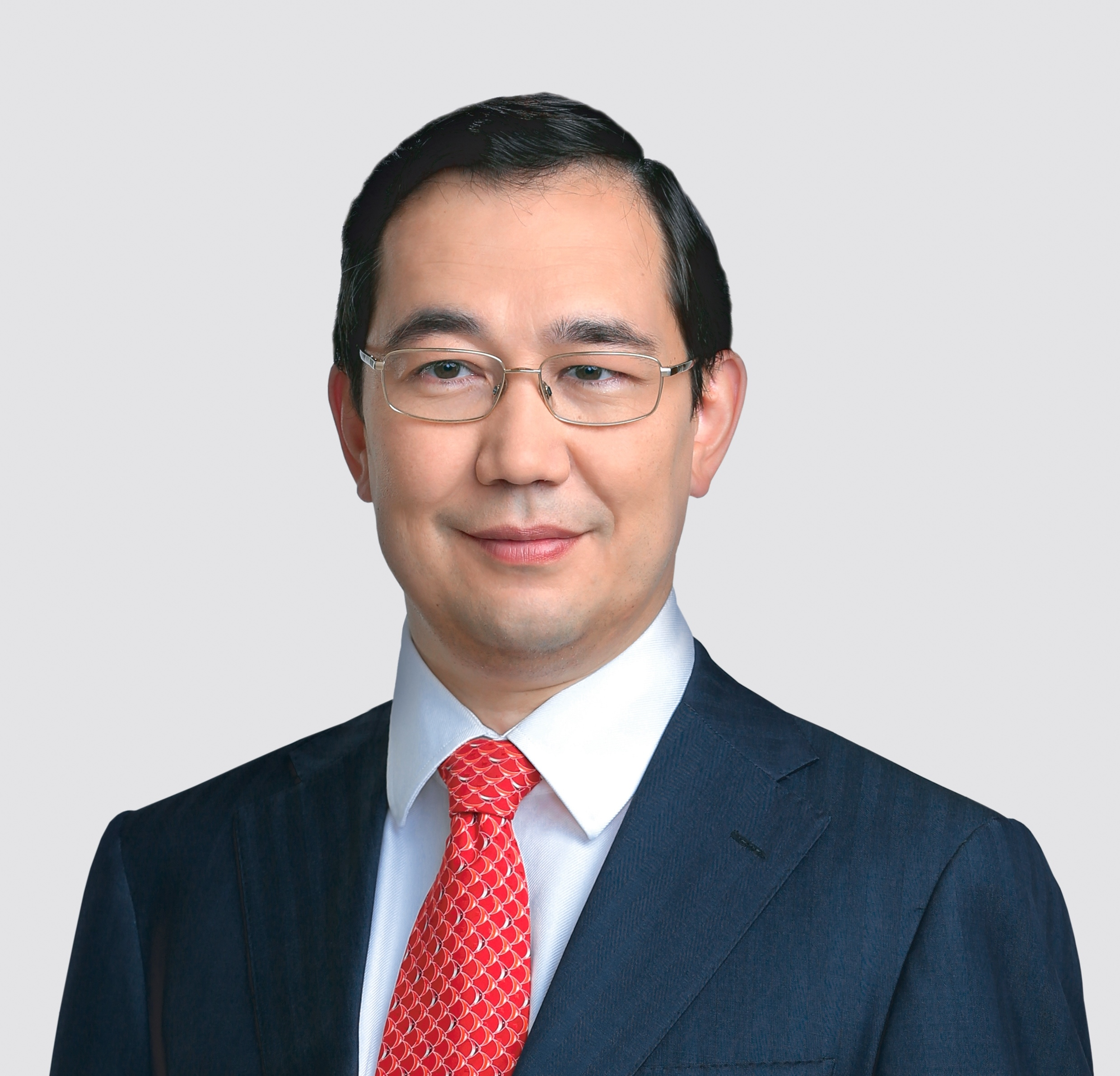

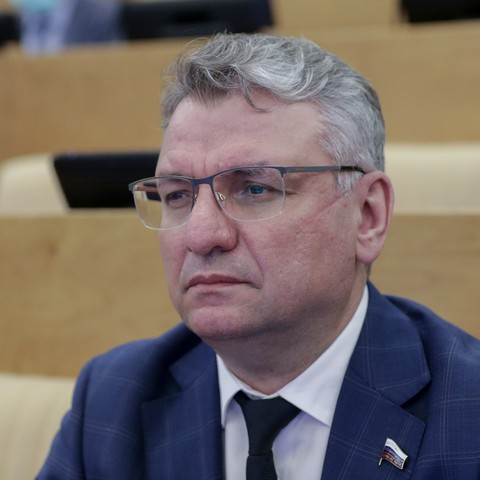
		CPRF
Candidate	Aysen Nikolayev	Viktor Gubarev
Party	United Russia	CPRF
Popular vote	238,432	32,750
Percentage	75.77%	10.41%
		CPCR
Candidate	Gavril Parakhin	Igor Borisov
Party	LDPR	Communists of Russia
Popular vote	17,914	16,378
Percentage	5.69%	5.20%
Head before election
Aysen Nikolayev
United Russia
Head-elect
Aysen Nikolayev
United Russia

The 2023 Sakha head election took place on 8–10 September 2023, on common election day, coinciding with the State Assembly of the Sakha Republic election. Incumbent Head Aysen Nikolayev was elected to a second term in office.

== Background ==
Then–Mayor of Yakutsk Aysen Nikolayev was appointed acting Head of the Sakha Republic in May 2018, replacing second-term incumbent Yegor Borisov, who resigned early at his own request. Nikolayev overwhelmingly won his first full term in September 2018 with 71.4% of the vote. Newly elected head Nikolayev also appointed Borisov, his predecessor, to the Federation Council.

The head election in the Sakha Republic is anticipated to be competitive as the region has moved sharply against ruling United Russia party in the prior years. One of the reasons of Borisov's resignation in 2018 allegedly were poor results of President Vladimir Putin in the 2018 presidential election: he won 64.4% of the vote in the region – his lowest result in the country, while CPRF candidate Pavel Grudinin received his best result with 27.3%. The Sakha Republic further defied national political landscape in 2018 as the Yakutsk mayoral election was won by Sardana Avksentyeva, a former deputy mayor nominated by Party of Russia's Rebirth, who defeated Yakutsk City Duma Speaker Aleksandr Savvinov of United Russia. In the 2021 Russian legislative election the Sakha Republic was among four Russian regions (alongside Mari El, Khabarovsk Krai and Nenets Autonomous Okrug) where CPRF bypassed United Russia in the party-list contest, on top of that Communist Petr Ammosov was elected in Yakutsk constituency in an upset, defeating United Russia candidate Pyotr Cherkashin and A Just Russia incumbent Fedot Tumusov (the actual candidate supported by regional authorities) 21.6%–20.1%–19.6%.

In December 2022, Aysen Nikolayev publicly announced his plans to run for re-election. However due to incumbent Head's dwindling ratings and success of the opposition in several elections in the region Nikolayev was considered to be a potential candidate for retirement watch, among his potential replacements were mentioned Yakutsk mayor Yevgeny Grigoryev and Prime Minister of the Sakha Republic Andrey Tarasenko.

== Candidates ==
In the Sakha Republic candidates for Head can be nominated only by registered political parties. Candidate for Head of the Sakha Republic should be a Russian citizen and at least 30 years old. Candidates for Head should not have a foreign citizenship or residence permit. Each candidate in order to be registered is required to collect at least 5% of signatures of members and heads of municipalities (257 signatures). Also head candidates present 3 candidacies to the Federation Council and election winner later appoints one of the presented candidates.

=== Registered ===
- Igor Borisov (Communists of Russia), Zhatay shipyard worker
- Viktor Gubarev (CPRF), Deputy Chairman of the State Assembly of the Sakha Republic (2013–present), Member of State Assembly (2008–present), 2014 and 2018 head candidate
- Aysen Nikolayev (United Russia), incumbent Head of the Sakha Republic (2018–present)
- Gavril Parakhin (LDPR), aide to State Duma member Valery Seleznev, former Member of State Duma (2021), 2014 and 2018 head candidate

=== Did not file ===
- Oleg Maklashov (Rodina), businessman, 2015 Amur Oblast gubernatorial candidate
- Yury Pshennikov (Civic Platform), pensioner
- Vladimir Timofeyev (RPPSS), Member of Vilyuysky District Council of Deputies (2013–present), psychiatrist
- Aleksandr Vakar (The Greens), funeral home director

=== Declined ===
- Valery Alekseyev (SR–ZP), economist, manager
- Petr Ammosov (CPRF), Member of State Duma (2021–present)
- Sardana Avksentyeva (New People), Member of State Duma (2021–present), former mayor of Yakutsk (2018–2021) (running for State Assembly)
- Ernst Beryozkin, former Member of State Assembly of the Sakha Republic (2004–2013), 2014 and 2018 Civic Platform head candidate
- Vladimir Fyodorov, former Member of State Assembly of the Sakha Republic (2002–2018) (switched to United Russia, running for State Assembly)
- Vasily Nikolayev (New People), entrepreneur
- Fedot Tumusov (SR–ZP), Member of State Duma (2007–present), 2001 presidential runoff candidate

=== Candidates for Federation Council ===
- Aysen Nikolayev (United Russia):
  - Olga Balabkina, Deputy Chairwoman of the Government of the Sakha Republic (2018–present)
  - Yegor Borisov, incumbent Senator from Sakha Republic (2018–present)
  - Aleksey Dyachkovsky, deputy general director of Alrosa

== Results ==

Summary of the 8–10 September 2023 Sakha head election results
Candidate	Party	Votes	%
Aysen Nikolayev (incumbent)	United Russia	238,432	75.77
Viktor Gubarev	Communist Party	32,750	10.41
Gavril Parakhin	Liberal Democratic Party	17,914	5.69
Igor Borisov	Communists of Russia	16,378	5.20
Valid votes		305,474	97.08
Blank ballots		9,189	2.92
Total		314,663	100.00
Turnout		314,663	48.37
Registered voters		650,535	100.00

Head Nikolayev re-appointed incumbent senator Yegor Borisov (United Russia) to the Federation Council.

== See also ==
- 2023 Russian regional elections
