= Yakutia constituency =

Russian legislative constituency

Yakutia single-member constituency
- Constituency of the Russian State Duma

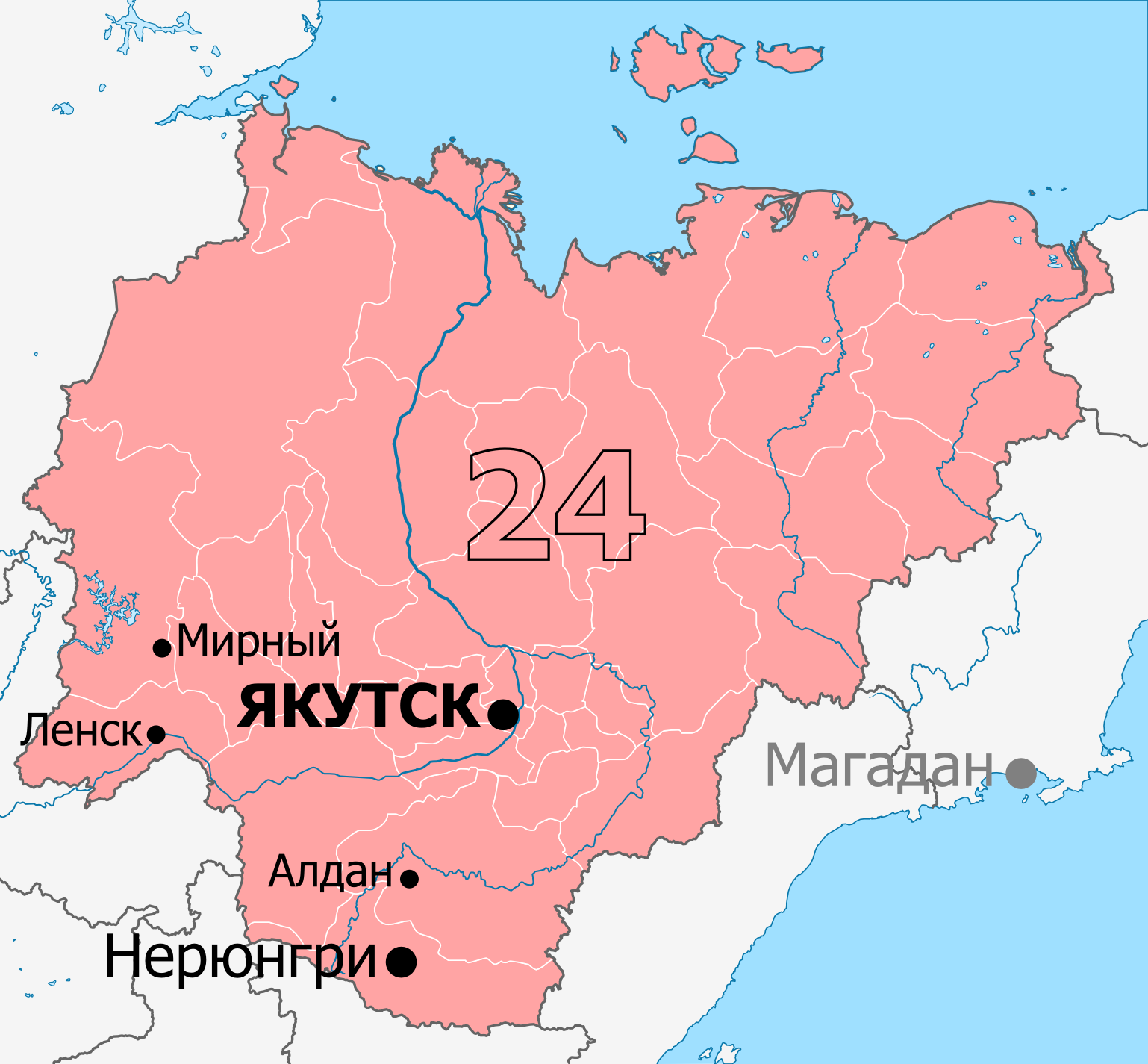
- Deputy: Pyotr Shamayev; United Russia
- Federal subject: Sakha Republic (Yakutia)
- Districts: Abyysky, Aldansky, Allaikhovsky, Amginsky, Anabarsky, Bulunsky, Churapchinsky, Eveno-Bytantaysky, Gorny, Khangalassky, Kobyaysky, Lensky, Megino-Kangalassky, Mirninsky, Momsky, Namsky, Neryungrinsky, Nizhnekolymsky, Nyurbinsky, Olenyoksky, Olyokminsky, Oymyakonsky, Srednekolymsky, Suntarsky, Tattinsky, Tomponsky, Ust-Aldansky, Ust-Maysky, Ust-Yansky, Verkhnekolymsky, Verkhnevilyuysky, Verkhoyansky, Vilyuysky, Yakutsk, Zhatay, Zhigansky
- Voters: 641,801 (2026)

The Yakutia constituency (No.29 (Note: No.21 in 1993-1995 and 2003-2007, No.20 in 1995-2003, No.24 in 2016–2026)) is a Russian legislative constituency in the Sakha Republic (Yakutia). The constituency encompasses the entire territory of Yakutia. Yakutia constituency is the largest single-mandate territorial constituency in the world (roughly the size of India).

The constituency has been represented since 2026 by United Russia deputy Pyotr Shamayev, former Sakha Minister of Youth and Social Communications, who won the open seat after one-term Communist incumbent Petr Ammosov was deselected by the party.

== Boundaries ==
1993–2007, 2016–present: Abyysky District, Aldansky District, Allaikhovsky District, Amginsky District, Anabarsky District, Bulunsky District, Churapchinsky District, Eveno-Bytantaysky National District, Gorny District, Khangalassky District, Kobyaysky District, Lensky District, Megino-Kangalassky District, Mirninsky District, Momsky District, Namsky District, Neryungrinsky District, Nizhnekolymsky District, Nyurbinsky District, Olenyoksky District, Olyokminsky District, Oymyakonsky District, Srednekolymsky District, Suntarsky District, Tattinsky District, Tomponsky District, Ust-Aldansky District, Ust-Maysky District, Ust-Yansky District, Verkhnekolymsky District, Verkhnevilyuysky District, Verkhoyansky District, Vilyuysky District, Yakutsk, Zhatay, Zhigansky District
The constituency has been covering the entirety of the Sakha Republic since its initial creation in 1993.

== Members elected ==
Election	Member	Party
1993	Yegor Zhirkov	Independent
1995	Zoya Kornilova	Power to the People!
1999	Vitaly Basygysov	Independent
2003	Vitaly Basygysov	Independent
2007	Proportional representation - no election by constituency	
2011	Proportional representation - no election by constituency	
2016	Fedot Tumusov	A Just Russia
2021	Petr Ammosov	Communist Party
2026	Pyotr Shamayev	United Russia

== Election results ==
=== 1993 ===
==== Declared candidates ====
- Vladimir Danilov (Independent), Vice Mayor of Yakutsk
- Viktor Dyuldin (DPR), union leader
- Yury Pozdnyakov (Independent), Deputy Mayor of Yakutsk
- Leonid Torgovkin (Independent), Deputy Mayor of Neryungri (1992–present), former Chairman of the Neryungri City Executive Committee (1989–1992)
- Sergey Yurkov (Civic Union), union leader
- Yegor Zhirkov (Independent), Minister of Education of the Sakha Republic (1992–present)

==== Results ====
Summary of the 12 December 1993 Russian legislative election in the Yakutia constituency
Candidate	Party	Votes	%
Yegor Zhirkov	Independent	149,443	36.50%
Yury Pozdnyakov	Independent	–	12.35%
Vladimir Danilov	Independent	–	–
Viktor Dyuldin	Democratic Party	–	–
Leonid Torgovkin	Independent	–	–
Sergey Yurkov	Civic Union	–	–
Total		409,461	100%

=== 1995 ===
==== Declared candidates ====
- Vyacheslav Filatov (Independent), First Deputy Chairman of the State Assembly of the Sakha Republic Chamber of the Republic (1995–present), Member of the State Assembly (1993–present)
- Valery Guminsky (Independent), gold mining executive
- Zoya Kornilova (V–N!), former People's Deputy of Russia (1990–1993)
- Pyotr Sarychev (Forward, Russia!), businessman
- Dmitry Tikhonov (Independent), former rector of Yakutsk State University Medical Institute (1993–1995)
- Galina Vasilyeva (Women of Russia), businesswoman
- Vasily Vinokurov (Independent), agricultural scientist
- Yegor Zhirkov (Independent), incumbent Member of State Duma (1994–present)

==== Results ====
Summary of the 17 December 1995 Russian legislative election in the Yakutia constituency
Candidate	Party	Votes	%
Zoya Kornilova	Power to the People!	110,567	28.38%
Yegor Zhirkov (incumbent)	Independent	110,245	28.30%
Valery Guminsky	Independent	37,128	9.53%
Vyacheslav Filatov	Independent	33,452	8.59%
Galina Vasilyeva	Women of Russia	24,579	6.31%
Dmitry Tikhonov	Independent	11,564	2.97%
Vasily Vinokurov	Independent	7,728	1.98%
Pyotr Sarychev	Forward, Russia!	7,454	1.91%
against all		39,409	10.12%
Total		389,552	100%

=== 1999 ===
==== Declared candidates ====
- Artur Alekseyev (Independent), Member of State Assembly of the Sakha Republic (1993–present), former First Secretary of the CPSU Yakutsk City Committee (1988–1991), 1996 presidential candidate
- Vitaly Basygysov (Independent), Head of Mirninsky District (1993–present)
- Ivan Cherov (Independent), Member of State Assembly of the Sakha Republic (1993–present), 1991 presidential candidate
- Aleksandr Kim-Kimen (Independent), Member of State Assembly of the Sakha Republic (1997–present), law firm president
- Zoya Kornilova (ROS), incumbent Member of State Duma (1996–present)
- Andrey Krivoshapkin-Ayyunga (Independent), retraining centre director
- Sergey Shkurenko (Independent), Member of State Assembly of the Sakha Republic (1997–present)
- Ulyana Vinokurova (Independent), Member of State Assembly of the Sakha Republic (1993–present)

==== Did not file ====
- Usementay Alekseyev (Nikolayev–Fyodorov Bloc), retired Soviet Border Troops colonel
- Vasily Atlasov (Independent), Sakha culture advocate
- Aleksandr Loginov (Yabloko), union leader
- Anastasia Tymkyl (Independent)

==== Results ====
Summary of the 19 December 1999 Russian legislative election in the Yakutia constituency
Candidate	Party	Votes	%
Vitaly Basygysov	Independent	95,869	26.00%
Zoya Kornilova (incumbent)	Russian All-People's Union	87,393	23.70%
Artur Alekseyev	Independent	85,655	23.23%
Sergey Shkurenko	Independent	31,629	8.58%
Aleksandr Kim-Kimen	Independent	27,430	7.44%
Ulyana Vinokurova	Independent	5,964	1.62%
Ivan Cherov	Independent	4,588	1.24%
Andrey Krivoshapkin-Ayynga	Independent	2,859	0.78%
against all		22,716	6.16%
Total		368,770	100%

=== 2003 ===
==== Declared candidates ====
- Vitaly Basygysov (Independent), incumbent Member of State Duma (2000–present)
- Aleksandr Gavrilyev (CPRF), Member of State Assembly of the Sakha Republic (2002–present)
- Semyon Nazarov (PVR-RPZh), former Premier of the Sakha Republic (2002–2003)
- Mikhail Sannikov (RP), former Alrosa president (1999–2003), 1996 and 2001 presidential candidate
- Ivan Shamayev (VR–ES), college director
- Viktor Shemchuk (ORP Rus'), nonprofit executive, 1991 vice presidential candidate
- Igor Treskov (SPS), Deputy Mayor of Yakutsk (2003–present)
- Fedot Tumusov (Rodina), Member of State Assembly of the Sakha Republic (1993–present), 2001–02 presidential candidate

==== Did not file ====
- Valery Atsgeyda (LDPR), agriculture businessman
- Rodion Kulichkin (Independent), unemployed

==== Results ====
Summary of the 7 December 2003 Russian legislative election in the Yakutia constituency
Candidate	Party	Votes	%
Vitaly Basygysov (incumbent)	Independent	196,646	47.69%
Fedot Tumusov	Rodina	56,202	13.63%
Semyon Nazarov	Party of Russia's Rebirth-Russian Party of Life	45,154	10.95%
Igor Treskov	Union of Right Forces	35,374	8.58%
Aleksandr Gavrilyev	Communist Party	18,060	4.38%
Ivan Shamayev	Great Russia – Eurasian Union	9,339	2.26%
Viktor Shemchuk	United Russian Party Rus'	3,661	0.89%
against all		41,686	10.11%
Total		412,340	100%

=== 2016 ===
==== Declared candidates ====
- Petr Ammosov (CPRF), Member of State Assembly of the Sakha Republic (2013–present), party secretary
- Aleksandr Lazarev (CPCR), perennial candidate
- Gavril Parakhin (LDPR), Member of State Assembly of the Sakha Republic (2013–present), 2014 head candidate
- Oleg Tarasov (Rodina), Member of State Assembly of the Sakha Republic (2002–present), energy executive
- Aisen Tikhonov (Party of Growth), former Yakutia Airlines executive, community activist
- Fedot Tumusov (A Just Russia), Member of State Duma (2007–present), 2003 Rodina candidate for this seat
- Aital Yefremov (The Greens), businessman
- Andrey Zayakin (Yabloko), physics junior researcher, Dissernet co-founder

==== Failed to qualify ====
- Alyona Atlasova (Independent), Member of State Assembly of the Sakha Republic (2013–present), nonprofit director
- Andrey Borisov (Independent), State Counsellor of the Sakha Republic (2014–present)
- Maksim Mestnikov (Independent), former Member of State Assembly of the Sakha Republic (1997–2002), 2014 TPR head candidate
- Zoya Solovyova (Independent), historian, United Russia primary candidate

==== Declined ====
- Sakhamin Afanasyev (United Russia), Minister of Ecology, Natural Resources, and Forestry of the Sakha Republic (2014–present) (lost the primary, ran on the party list)
- Galina Danchikova (United Russia), Premier of the Sakha Republic (2010–present) (won the primary, ran on the party list)
- Viktor Fyodorov (United Russia), Member of State Assembly of the Sakha Republic (2013–present) (lost the primary)
- Yury Kuriyanov (United Russia), Chief of Staff to the Head of the Sakha Republic (2012–present) (lost the primary, ran on the party list)
- Aleksandr Susoyev (United Russia), Member of State Assembly of the Sakha Republic (2013–present), union leader (lost the primary)

==== Results ====
Summary of the 18 September 2016 Russian legislative election in the Yakutia constituency
Candidate	Party	Votes	%
Fedot Tumusov	A Just Russia	112,019	37.52%
Oleg Tarasov	Rodina	61,048	20.45%
Petr Ammosov	Communist Party	46,177	15.47%
Gavril Parakhin	Liberal Democratic Party	20,303	6.80%
Aisen Tikhonov	Party of Growth	13,366	4.48%
Aleksandr Lazarev	Communists of Russia	11,719	3.92%
Aital Yefremov	The Greens	11,097	3.72%
Andrey Zayakin	Yabloko	8,800	2.95%
Total		298,589	100%

=== 2021 ===
Results by district: Petr Ammosov Pyotr Cherkashin Fedot Tumusov Vasily Nikolayev

==== Declared candidates ====
- Petr Ammosov (CPRF), Member of State Assembly of the Sakha Republic (2013–present), party secretary, 2016 candidate for this seat
- Pyotr Cherkashin (United Russia), former Member of Borogonsky Nasleg Council of Deputies (2017–2021), community activist
- Anatoly Kyrdzhagasov (GP), Member of Yakutsk City Duma (2009–present), utilities executive
- Aleksey Laptev (Rodina), entrepreneur, community activist, 2018 head candidate
- Vasily Nikolayev (New People), businessman
- Anatoly Nogovitsyn (Yabloko), chairman of the party regional office
- Gavril Parakhin (LDPR), Member of State Duma (2021–present), 2014 and 2018 head candidate, 2016 candidate for this seat
- Fedot Tumusov (SR–ZP), incumbent Member of State Duma (2007–present)
- Yegor Zhirkov (The Greens), former Member of State Assembly of the Sakha Republic (1997–1998, 2008–2018), former Member of State Duma (1994–1995)

==== Failed to qualify ====
- Aleksey Chertkov (ROS), journalist, Russian activist
- Lyudmila Ivanova (Independent), pensioner
- Ivan Stepanov (Independent), nonprofit director

==== Results ====
Summary of the 17-19 September 2021 Russian legislative election in the Yakutia constituency
Candidate	Party	Votes	%
Petr Ammosov	Communist Party	69,215	21.61%
Pyotr Cherkashin	United Russia	64,275	20.07%
Fedot Tumusov (incumbent)	A Just Russia — For Truth	62,597	19.55%
Vasily Nikolayev	New People	49,703	15.52%
Yegor Zhirkov	The Greens	20,067	6.27%
Anatoly Nogovitsyn	Yabloko	18,322	5.72%
Gavril Parakhin	Liberal Democratic Party	12,446	3.89%
Anatoly Kyrdzhagasov	Civic Platform	8,611	2.69%
Aleksey Laptev	Rodina	5,259	1.64%
Total		320,227	100%

=== 2026 ===
==== Declared candidates ====
- Aleksey Laptev (Rodina), Member of Ust-Yansky District Council (2022–present), Rusatom Overseas regional manager, 2018 head candidate, 2021 candidate for this seat
- Anatoly Nogovitsyn (Yabloko), chairman of the party regional office, 2021 candidate for this seat
- Gavril Parakhin (LDPR), Member of State Assembly of the Sakha Republic (2013–2021, 2023–present), former Member of State Duma (2021), 2014, 2018 and 2023 head candidate, 2016 and 2021 candidate for this seat
- Pyotr Shamayev (United Russia), Minister of Youth and Social Communications of the Sakha Republic (2021–present)
- Anna Syromyatnikova (The Greens), youth activist
- Fedot Tumusov (A Just Russia), Member of State Duma (2007–present)
- Ayaan Vasilyev (CPRF), Member of Yakutsk City Duma (2013–present), middle school principal
- Vladimir Yu (CPCR), Member of Yakutsk City Duma (2023–present), former gymnasium deputy principal
- Nyurguyana Zamorshchikova (New People), Member of State Assembly of the Sakha Republic (2023–present)

==== Did not file ====
- Anton Vasilyev (Independent), community activist

==== Declined ====
- Petr Ammosov (CPRF), incumbent Member of State Duma (2021–present) (lost the primary)
- Sardana Avksentyeva (New People), Member of State Duma (2021–present) (running on the party list)
- Ernst Beryozkin (CPRF), former Member of State Assembly of the Sakha Republic (2008–2013), former Alrosa first vice president, 2014 and 2018 GP head candidate

==== Results ====
Summary of the 18-20 September 2026 Russian legislative election in the Yakutia constituency
Candidate	Party	Votes	%
Pyotr Shamayev	United Russia	117,680	37.35%
Fedot Tumusov	A Just Russia	53,611	17.01%
Nyurguyana Zamorshchikova	New People	46,472	14.75%
Ayaan Vasilyev	Communist Party	39,107	12.41%
Anatoly Nogovitsyn	Yabloko	20,626	6.55%
Gavril Parakhin	Liberal Democratic Party	11,442	3.63%
Vladimir Yu	Communists of Russia	8,317	2.64%
Anna Syromyatnikova	The Greens	6,222	1.97%
Aleksey Laptev	Rodina	4,008	1.27%
Total		315,085	100%
