= 2023 Sakha Republic State Assembly election =

← 2018	8–10 September 2023	2028 →
- Turnout: 48.30%
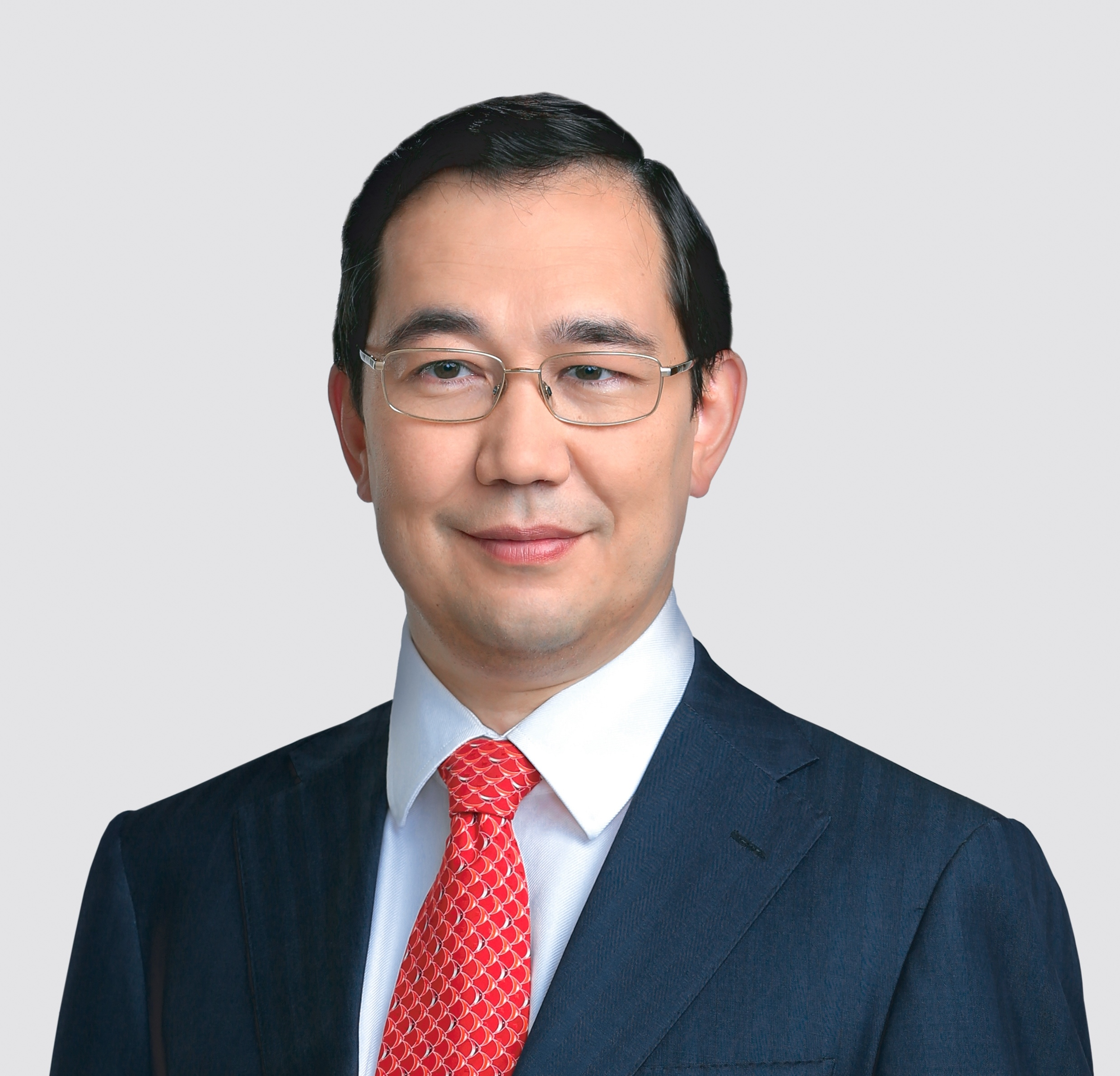

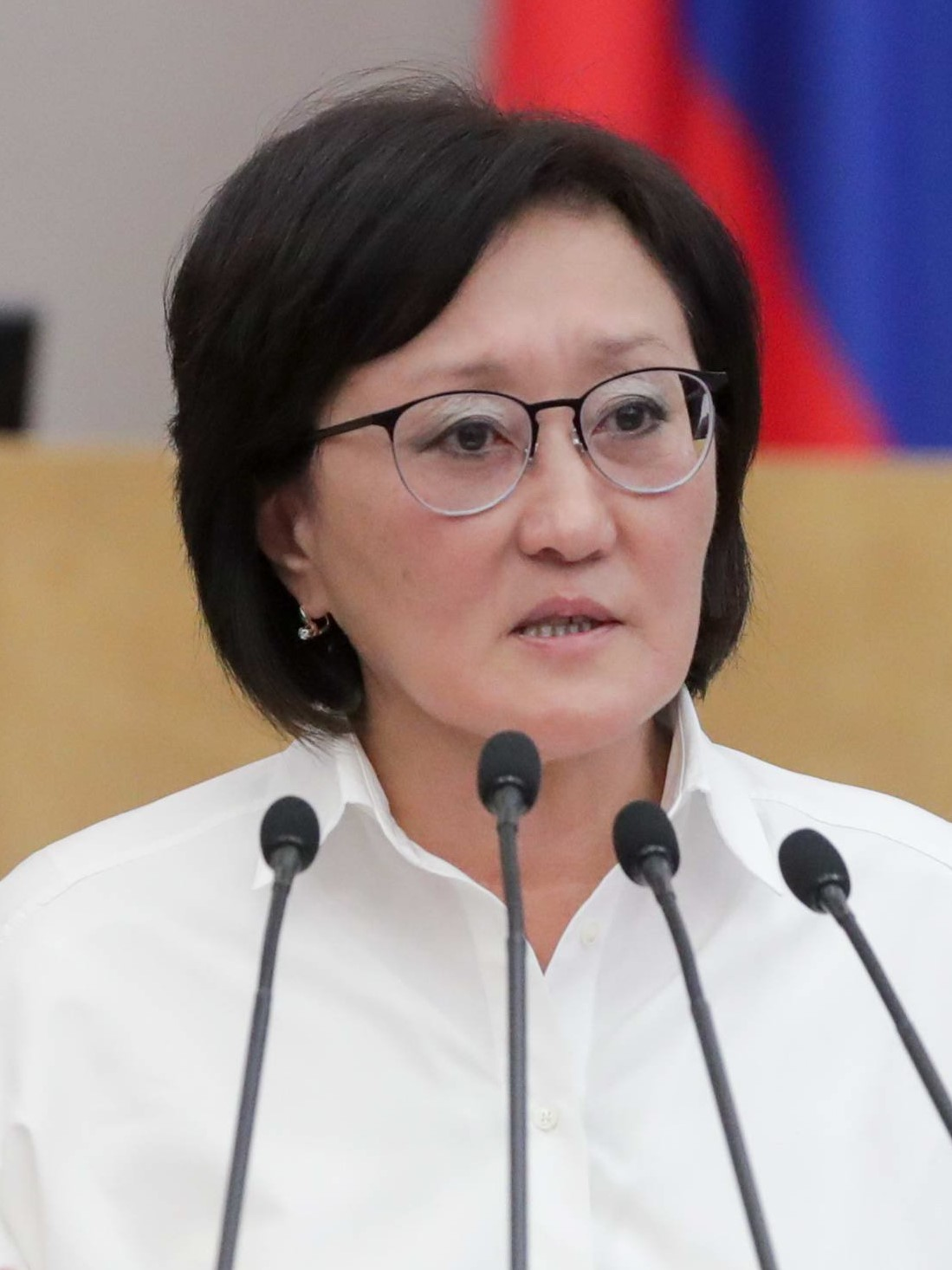

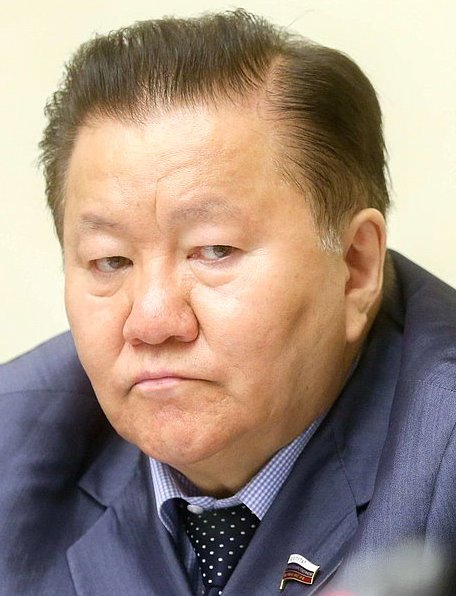

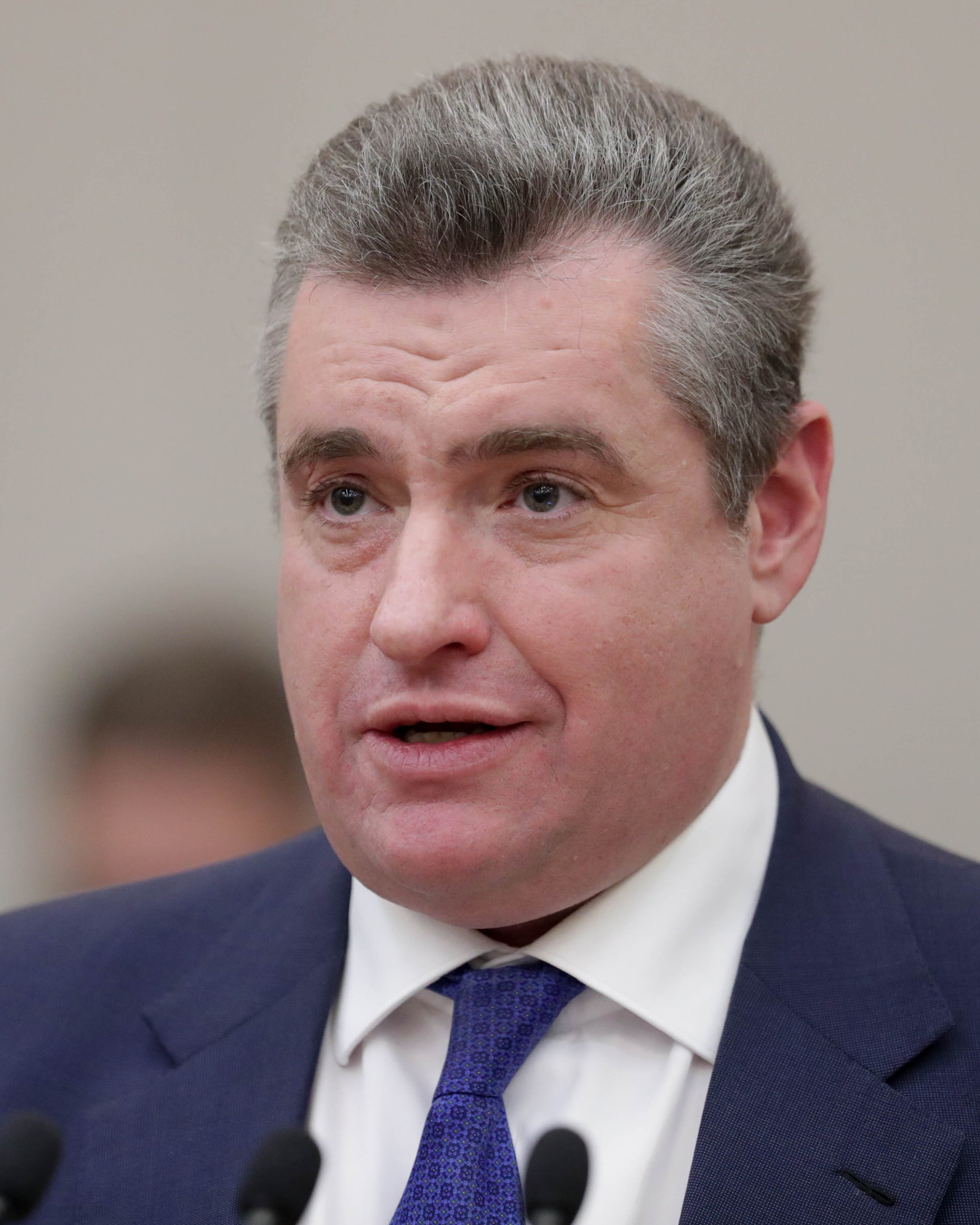
	Majority party	Minority party	Third party
			CPRF
Candidate	Aysen Nikolayev	Sardana Avksentyeva	Viktor Gubarev
Leader	Dmitry Medvedev	Aleksey Nechayev	Gennady Zyuganov
Party	United Russia	New People	CPRF
Last election	43 seats, 53.35%	Did not exist	10 seats, 19.43%
Seats won	55	6	4
Seat change	▲12	Did not exist	▼6
Popular vote	170,832	44,528	41,344
Percentage	54.36%	14.17%	13.16%
Swing	▲1.01%	Did not exist	▼6.27%
	Fourth party	Fifth party	Sixth party
			Rodina
Candidate	Fedot Tumusov	Leonid Slutsky	Aleksey Laptev
Leader	Sergey Mironov	Leonid Slutsky	Alexey Zhuravlyov
Party	SR-ZP	LDPR	Rodina
Last election	9 seats, 16.19%	4 seats, 9.56%	Did not participate
Seats won	3	1	0
Seat change	▼6	▼3	Did not participate
Popular vote	29,503	16,928	3,201
Percentage	9.39%	5.39%	1.02%
Swing	▼6.80%	▼4.17%	Did not participate

The 2023 State Assembly of the Sakha Republic election took place on 8–10 September 2023, on common election day, coinciding with 2023 Sakha head election. All 70 seats in the State Assembly were up for reelection.

== Electoral system ==
Under current election laws, the State Assembly is elected for a term of five years, with parallel voting. 35 seats are elected by party-list proportional representation with a 5% electoral threshold, with the other half elected in 35 single-member constituencies by first-past-the-post voting. Seats in the proportional part are allocated using the Imperiali quota, modified to ensure that every party list, which passes the threshold, receives at least one mandate.

== Candidates ==
=== Party lists ===
To register regional lists of candidates, parties need to collect 0.5% of signatures of all registered voters in Yakutia.

The following parties were relieved from the necessity to collect signatures:

- United Russia
- Communist Party of the Russian Federation
- A Just Russia — Patriots — For Truth
- Liberal Democratic Party of Russia
- New People
- Party of Growth
- Party for Fairness!
- Civic Platform

№	Party	Republic-wide list	Candidates	Territorial groups	Status
1	A Just Russia – For Truth	Fedot Tumusov • Igor Grigoryev	80	35	Registered
2	Liberal Democratic Party	Leonid Slutsky • Gavril Parakhin • Semyon Makarov	50	30	Registered
3	New People	Sardana Avksentyeva • Vasily Nikolayev • Olga Sherstyannikova	61	35	Registered
4	Communist Party	Viktor Gubarev • Tatyana Ollonova • Ayaan Vasilyev	65	34	Registered
5	United Russia	Aysen Nikolayev	118	35	Registered
6	Rodina	Aleksey Laptev • Oleg Maklashov • Grigory Popov	27	24	Registered

New People and Rodina will take part in Sakha legislative election for the first time.

=== Single-mandate constituencies ===
35 single-mandate constituencies were formed in Yakutia. To register candidates in single-mandate constituencies need to collect 3% of signatures of registered voters in the constituency.

Number of candidates in single-mandate constituencies
Party	Candidates	
Party	Nominated	Registered
United Russia	35	35
Communist Party	18	18
A Just Russia — For Truth	34	33
Liberal Democratic Party	25	23
New People	32	31
Rodina	17	17
Civic Platform	7	6
Yabloko	3	0
Party of Business	1	0
Independent	9	4
Total	181	167

== Results ==
=== Results by party lists ===
Summary of the 8–10 September 2023 State Assembly of the Sakha Republic election results
Party	Party list					Constituency		Total	
Party	Votes	%	±pp	Seats	+/–	Seats	+/–	Seats	+/–
United Russia	179,832	54.36	▲1.01%	22	▲2	33	▲10	55	▲12
New People	44,528	14.17	New	5	New	1	New	6	New
Communist Party	41,344	13.16	▼6.27%	4	▼3	0	▼3	4	▼6
A Just Russia — For Truth	29,503	9.39	▼6.80%	3	▼2	0	▼4	3	▼4
Liberal Democratic Party	16,928	5.39	▼4.17%	1	▼2	0	▼1	1	▼3
Rodina	3,201	1.02	New	0	New	0	New	0	New
Civic Platform	—	—	—	—	—	0	▼1	0	▼1
Independents	—	—	—	—	—	1	▼2	1	▼2
Invalid ballots	7,900	2.51	▼1.31%	—	—	—	—	—	—
Total	314,236	100.00	—	35	Steady	35	Steady	70	Steady
Turnout	314,236	48.30	▼2.39%	—	—	—	—	—	—
Registered voters	650,534	100.00	—	—	—	—	—	—	—

Aleksey Yeremeyev (United Russia) was re-elected as Chairman of the State Assembly, while assemblymember Sakhamin Afanasyev (United Russia) was appointed to the Federation Council, replacing incumbent Senator Aleksandr Akimov (United Russia), who failed to get elected to the State Assembly.

=== Results in single-member constituencies ===
==== District 1 ====
Summary of the 8–10 September 2023 State Assembly of the Sakha Republic election in Zalozhny constituency No.1
Candidate	Party	Votes	%
Vladimir Yegorov	United Russia	4,477	46.01%
Nyurguyana Zamorshchikova	New People	2,130	21.89%
Sofron Afanasyev	A Just Russia — For Truth	1,382	14.20%
Viktoria Alekseyeva	Liberal Democratic Party	698	7.17%
Erel Vasilyev	Civic Platform	587	6.03%
Total		9,731	100%

==== District 2 ====
Summary of the 8–10 September 2023 State Assembly of the Sakha Republic election in Avtodorozhny constituency No.2
Candidate	Party	Votes	%
Svetlana Davydova	United Russia	3,012	47.61%
Gavril Chemokhanov	New People	1,201	18.98%
Viktor Sofronov	Communist Party	1,149	18.16%
Artyom Tyunkov	Liberal Democratic Party	361	5.71%
Kirill Sofronov	Civic Platform	177	2.80%
Viktor Zhuravlev	Rodina	139	2.20%
Total		6,327	100%

==== District 3 ====
Summary of the 8–10 September 2023 State Assembly of the Sakha Republic election in Saysarsky constituency No.3
Candidate	Party	Votes	%
Vladimir Fedorov	United Russia	4,041	58.06%
Denis Vasilyev	A Just Russia — For Truth	1,155	16.59%
Mikhail Lukin	New People	905	13.00%
Natalya Solikhova	Liberal Democratic Party	313	4.50%
Ilya Sidorenko	Rodina	192	2.76%
Total		6,960	100%

==== District 4 ====
Summary of the 8–10 September 2023 State Assembly of the Sakha Republic election in Universitetsky constituency No.4
Candidate	Party	Votes	%
Anatoly Nikolayev (incumbent)	United Russia	5,713	53.80%
Arkady Platonov	New People	1,700	16.01%
Michil Nikolayev	A Just Russia — For Truth	1,314	12.37%
Svetlana Kochegarova	Liberal Democratic Party	940	8.85%
Vladislav Parnikov	Rodina	534	5.03%
Total		10,619	100%

==== District 5 ====
Summary of the 8–10 September 2023 State Assembly of the Sakha Republic election in Central constituency No.5
Candidate	Party	Votes	%
Ivan Lutskan	United Russia	4,368	49.04%
Vyacheslav Stepanov	Communist Party	1,421	15.95%
Nyurgun Yefremov	New People	1,288	15.58%
Afanasy Nikolayev	A Just Russia — For Truth	576	6.47%
Natalya Gogoleva	Civic Platform	364	4.09%
Mikhail Yermolayev	Liberal Democratic Party	280	3.14%
Andrey Alekseyev	Rodina	240	2.69%
Total		8,907	100%

==== District 6 ====
Summary of the 8–10 September 2023 State Assembly of the Sakha Republic election in Stroitelny constituency No.6
Candidate	Party	Votes	%
Ivan Danilov (incumbent)	United Russia	3,175	45.60%
Nikolay Barashkov	A Just Russia — For Truth	1,277	18.34%
Angelina Mateychik	New People	1,012	14.54%
Kyydaana Ivanova	Liberal Democratic Party	827	11.88%
Yelizoveta Solomonova	Rodina	332	4.77%
Total		6,962	100%

==== District 7 ====
Summary of the 8–10 September 2023 State Assembly of the Sakha Republic election in Poyarkovsky constituency No.7
Candidate	Party	Votes	%
Viktor Fedorov (incumbent)	United Russia	3,320	37.87%
Edgar Konstantinov	Communist Party	1,876	21.40%
Sergey Petrov	New People	1,443	16.46%
Yury Zhegusov	A Just Russia — For Truth	1,195	13.63%
Aleksey Kupriyanov	Civic Platform	487	5.55%
Total		8,767	100%

==== District 8 ====
Summary of the 8–10 September 2023 State Assembly of the Sakha Republic election in Naberezhny constituency No.8
Candidate	Party	Votes	%
Nikolay Bugayev	United Russia	2,760	30.86%
Anatoly Kyrdzhagasov	Civic Platform	1,996	22.32%
Olga Alekseyeva	A Just Russia — For Truth	1,521	17.01%
Tatyana Tymyrova	New People	1,433	16.02%
Dmitry Chibirev	Liberal Democratic Party	510	5.70%
Zakhar Petukhov	Rodina	341	3.81%
Total		8,944	100%

==== District 9 ====
Summary of the 8–10 September 2023 State Assembly of the Sakha Republic election in Darkylakhsky constituency No.9
Candidate	Party	Votes	%
Aleksandr Podgolov	United Russia	2,673	43.30%
Aleksey Romashov	A Just Russia — For Truth	1,114	18.05%
Olga Sherstyannikova	New People	769	12.46%
Maksim Salikhov	Communist Party	639	10.35%
Maria Saleyeva	Civic Platform	346	5.61%
Natalya Timchenko	Rodina	214	3.47%
Total		6,173	100%

==== District 10 ====
Summary of the 8–10 September 2023 State Assembly of the Sakha Republic election in Gagarinsky constituency No.10
Candidate	Party	Votes	%
Dmitry Pankov	United Russia	2,801	42.57%
Andrey Illarionov	A Just Russia — For Truth	1,922	29.21%
Igor Denisov	Liberal Democratic Party	771	11.72%
Viktor Turantayev	Rodina	696	10.58%
Total		6,579	100%

==== District 11 ====
Summary of the 8–10 September 2023 State Assembly of the Sakha Republic election in Prigorodny constituency No.11
Candidate	Party	Votes	%
Pavel Petrov (incumbent)	United Russia	2,477	44.56%
Mikhail Mikhaylov	Communist Party	942	16.95%
Mikael Zabolotny	A Just Russia — For Truth	734	13.20%
Lyubomir Mikhaylov	New People	628	11.30%
Nina Shchegoleva	Liberal Democratic Party	475	8.54%
Total		5,559	100%

==== District 12 ====
Summary of the 8–10 September 2023 State Assembly of the Sakha Republic election in Vilyuysky constituency No.12
Candidate	Party	Votes	%
Yegor Grigoryev	United Russia	7,004	68.39%
Ivan Kirillin	A Just Russia — For Truth	1,814	17.71%
Aleksey Everstov	New People	634	6.19%
Ayaal Petrov	Independent	473	4.62%
Total		10,241	100%

==== District 13 ====
Summary of the 8–10 September 2023 State Assembly of the Sakha Republic election in Nyurbinsky constituency No.13
Candidate	Party	Votes	%
Georgy Balakshin	United Russia	5,359	53.40%
Aleksandr Ivanov	New People	3,731	37.18%
Stepan Osipov	A Just Russia — For Truth	591	5.89%
Naryyaana Vasilyeva	Liberal Democratic Party	190	1.89%
Total		10,035	100%

==== District 14 ====
Summary of the 8–10 September 2023 State Assembly of the Sakha Republic election in Suntarsky constituency No.14
Candidate	Party	Votes	%
Andrey Nikolayev (incumbent)	United Russia	3,721	37.97%
Vladimir Yegorov	A Just Russia — For Truth	3,528	36.00%
Ivan Sakhatayev	New People	1,565	15.97%
Igor Ivanov	Communist Party	763	7.79%
Total		9,799	100%

==== District 15 ====
Summary of the 8–10 September 2023 State Assembly of the Sakha Republic election in Verkhnevilyuysko-Gorny constituency No.15
Candidate	Party	Votes	%
Vladimir Poskachin	Independent	8,320	62.81%
Feodosia Gabysheva (incumbent)	United Russia	4,152	31.35%
Aelita Zakharova	New People	406	3.07%
Nikolay Ilyin	Rodina	186	1.40%
Total		13,246	100%

==== District 16 ====
Summary of the 8–10 September 2023 State Assembly of the Sakha Republic election in Olyokminsky constituency No.16
Candidate	Party	Votes	%
Nikolay Kulbertinov (incumbent)	United Russia	4,436	54.60%
Oksana Mikhaylova	A Just Russia — For Truth	2,118	26.07%
Alyona Kolmygina	Communist Party	593	7.30%
Yury Kondratyev	Liberal Democratic Party	412	5.07%
Aleksandra Yakovleva	New People	249	3.06%
Total		8,125	100%

==== District 17 ====
Summary of the 8–10 September 2023 State Assembly of the Sakha Republic election in Aldansky constituency No.17
Candidate	Party	Votes	%
Vadim Mazurok	United Russia	2,664	33.71%
Igor Grigoryev (incumbent)	A Just Russia — For Truth	2,428	30.73%
Roza Solnyshkina (incumbent)	Communist Party	918	11.62%
Maria Baramygina	New People	790	10.00%
Valentin Semerkov	Liberal Democratic Party	680	8.61%
Total		7,902	100%

==== District 18 ====
Summary of the 8–10 September 2023 State Assembly of the Sakha Republic election in Tommotsky constituency No.18
Candidate	Party	Votes	%
Oleg Markov	United Russia	6,072	67.88%
Albert Yegorov	New People	868	9.70%
Aleksandr Plotsky	A Just Russia — For Truth	828	9.26%
Gennady Mulduyanov	Communist Party	733	8.19%
Artyom Kamentsev	Liberal Democratic Party	164	1.83%
Total		8,945	100%

==== District 19 ====
Summary of the 8–10 September 2023 State Assembly of the Sakha Republic election in Yuzhno-Yakutsky constituency No.19
Candidate	Party	Votes	%
Pavel Kovalchuk	United Russia	1,033	25.59%
Vladimir Sarin	Liberal Democratic Party	724	17.94%
Tsyrema Mironova	A Just Russia — For Truth	701	17.37%
Yelena Lukyanova	New People	677	16.77%
Aleksandra Zhuk	Communist Party	410	10.16%
Zalia Lebedeva	Rodina	231	5.72%
Total		4,036	100%

==== District 20 ====
Summary of the 8–10 September 2023 State Assembly of the Sakha Republic election in Promyshlenny constituency No.20
Candidate	Party	Votes	%
Olga Goryunova	United Russia	1,512	27.60%
Tamerlan Karayev	New People	1,041	19.00%
Valery Selin	A Just Russia — For Truth	966	17.63%
Vladislav Illus	Liberal Democratic Party	866	15.81%
Oleg Pustovoy (incumbent)	Communist Party	517	9.44%
Yevgeny Nigay	Rodina	276	5.04%
Total		5,479	100%

==== District 21 ====
Summary of the 8–10 September 2023 State Assembly of the Sakha Republic election in Neryungrinsky constituency No.21
Candidate	Party	Votes	%
Aleksandr Koshukov (incumbent)	United Russia	3,409	65.98%
Andrey Kuskov	Liberal Democratic Party	503	9.73%
Yelena Zolotukhina	Communist Party	456	8.83%
Leysan Nurislamova	A Just Russia — For Truth	397	7.68%
Yelena Sidorova	Rodina	160	3.10%
Total		5,167	100%

==== District 22 ====
Summary of the 8–10 September 2023 State Assembly of the Sakha Republic election in Aykhalsko-Udachninsky constituency No.22
Candidate	Party	Votes	%
Sergey Dombrovan	United Russia	4,071	55.46%
Olga Oshchepkova	New People	1,476	20.11%
Andrey Ruskin	Liberal Democratic Party	793	10.80%
Klimenty Cheremkin	Communist Party	364	4.96%
Oleg Piskunov (incumbent)	A Just Russia — For Truth	304	4.14%
Total		7,341	100%

==== District 23 ====
Summary of the 8–10 September 2023 State Assembly of the Sakha Republic election in Mirninsky constituency No.23
Candidate	Party	Votes	%
Tatyana Sharova	United Russia	2,482	40.64%
Andrey Kuznetsov	Communist Party	1,160	18.99%
Aleksandr Televitsky	Liberal Democratic Party	1,049	17.18%
Dmitry Ivanov	New People	685	11.22%
Vladimir Bogdanov (incumbent)	A Just Russia — For Truth	452	7.40%
Total		6,107	100%

==== District 24 ====
Summary of the 8–10 September 2023 State Assembly of the Sakha Republic election in Lensky constituency No.24
Candidate	Party	Votes	%
Natalya Sidorkina	New People	1,960	33.49%
Aleksandr Kuksa	United Russia	1,948	33.28%
Oleg Karnaukhov	A Just Russia — For Truth	829	14.16%
Pavel Dikhtyaruk	Communist Party	516	8.82%
Marina Gorokhova	Liberal Democratic Party	281	4.80%
Irina Uryadnikova	Rodina	99	1.69%
Total		5,853	100%

==== District 25 ====
Summary of the 8–10 September 2023 State Assembly of the Sakha Republic election in Mukhtuysky constituency No.25
Candidate	Party	Votes	%
Nikolay Nottosov	United Russia	2,946	38.20%
Nadezhda Andreyeva	New People	1,474	19.11%
Kapiton Zorin	Liberal Democratic Party	1,213	15.73%
Spartak Andreyev	Communist Party	892	11.56%
Aleksey Legantyev	A Just Russia — For Truth	824	10.68%
Total		7,713	100%

==== District 26 ====
Summary of the 8–10 September 2023 State Assembly of the Sakha Republic election in Megino-Kangalassky constituency No.26
Candidate	Party	Votes	%
Andrey Nakhodkin (incumbent)	United Russia	5,370	62.38%
Gury Gerasimov	A Just Russia — For Truth	1,739	20.20%
Vasily Nikolayev	New People	849	9.86%
Yevgeny Negnyurov	Liberal Democratic Party	362	4.21%
Total		8,608	100%

==== District 27 ====
Summary of the 8–10 September 2023 State Assembly of the Sakha Republic election in Khangalassky constituency No.27
Candidate	Party	Votes	%
Alish Mamedov (incumbent)	United Russia	7,820	82.65%
Aleksandr Tretyakov	New People	853	9.02%
Olga Sevostyanova	Independent	307	3.24%
Andrey Goryunov	A Just Russia — For Truth	156	1.65%
Aleksandr Dedyukhin	Liberal Democratic Party	110	1.16%
Total		9,462	100%

==== District 28 ====
Summary of the 8–10 September 2023 State Assembly of the Sakha Republic election in Namsky constituency No.28
Candidate	Party	Votes	%
Aleksey Yeremeyev (incumbent)	United Russia	9,010	78.50%
Algys Pavlov	A Just Russia — For Truth	1,442	12.56%
Stepan Sofronov	Rodina	668	5.82%
Total		11,477	100%

==== District 29 ====
Summary of the 8–10 September 2023 State Assembly of the Sakha Republic election in Borogonsky constituency No.29
Candidate	Party	Votes	%
Aleksandr Zhirkov (incumbent)	United Russia	7,111	69.71%
Yevgeny Krivoshapkin	A Just Russia — For Truth	2,729	26.75%
Aleksandr Degtyaryov	Rodina	218	2.14%
Total		10,201	100%

==== District 30 ====
Summary of the 8–10 September 2023 State Assembly of the Sakha Republic election in Churapchinsky constituency No.30
Candidate	Party	Votes	%
Dmitry Poiseyev	United Russia	6,288	61.47%
Nikolay Popov	Communist Party	1,921	18.78%
Nikolay Syromyatnikov	A Just Russia — For Truth	1,185	11.58%
Ilya Nikolayev	New People	708	6.92%
Total		10,230	100%

==== District 31 ====
Summary of the 8–10 September 2023 State Assembly of the Sakha Republic election in Amgino-Maysky constituency No.31
Candidate	Party	Votes	%
Aleksandr Koryakin	United Russia	6,537	68.05%
Stanislav Terentyev	New People	1,594	16.59%
Maksim Ivanov	A Just Russia — For Truth	1,145	11.92%
Total		9,606	100%

==== District 32 ====
Summary of the 8–10 September 2023 State Assembly of the Sakha Republic election in Tattinsko-Tomponsky constituency No.32
Candidate	Party	Votes	%
Viktor Lebedev (incumbent)	United Russia	6,895	74.40%
Yekaterina Yermolayeva	New People	1,244	13.42%
Konstantin Bochorukov	A Just Russia — For Truth	894	9.65%
Total		9,268	100%

==== District 33 ====
Summary of the 8–10 September 2023 State Assembly of the Sakha Republic election in National Northern constituency No.33
Candidate	Party	Votes	%
Yelena Golomareva	United Russia	4,627	43.27%
Mikhail Everstov (incumbent)	Independent	2,305	21.56%
Savva Afanasyev	Rodina	1,576	14.74%
Arkady Alekseyev	A Just Russia — For Truth	1,298	12.14%
Yevgeny Kobyakov	New People	556	5.20%
Total		10,693	100%

==== District 34 ====
Summary of the 8–10 September 2023 State Assembly of the Sakha Republic election in Kolymo-Indigirsky constituency No.34
Candidate	Party	Votes	%
Sakhamin Afanasyev (incumbent)	United Russia	5,723	63.83%
Vladimir Malashkin	New People	2,277	25.40%
Maksim Kazdobin	A Just Russia — For Truth	618	6.89%
Total		8,966	100%

==== District 35 ====
Summary of the 8–10 September 2023 State Assembly of the Sakha Republic election in Arctic constituency No.35
Candidate	Party	Votes	%
Vitaly Chikachev	United Russia	5,616	58.84%
Igor Potapov	New People	1,177	12.33%
Arkady Klepechin	A Just Russia — For Truth	1,132	11.86%
Vladimir Kychkin	Communist Party	709	7.43%
Semyon Makarov	Liberal Democratic Party	359	3.76%
Valentin Klimentov	Rodina	191	2.00%
Total		9,544	100%

== See also ==
- 2023 Russian regional elections
