= NVK =

NVK or Nvk may refer to:

== Aviation ==
- Narvik Airport, Framnes, Norway (1935–2017; IATA:NVK)
- Nizhnevartovskavia, a Russian airline (ICAO:NVK); see List of airline codes (N)

== Businesses ==
- NVK Sakha, a Russian broadcaster (founded 1992)
- Norsk Vandbygningskontor, a Norwegian engineering firm (1908–2003)

== Science ==
- Nevskite, a lead gray mineral (symbol: Nvk); see List of mineral symbols § N
- Dutch Crystallographic Society (Dutch: Nederlandse Vereniging voor Kristallografie), a section of the Royal Netherlands Chemical Society
- Pediatric Association of the Netherlands (Dutch: Nederlandse Vereniging voor Kindergeneeskunde)

== Other uses ==
- NVK, a pseudonymous 2020 novel by Rupert Thomson
- N. V. Krishnaiah (1930–2006), Indian politician
