= Town of district significance =

Administrative division type in Russia

Town of district significance is an administrative division of a district in a federal subject of Russia. It is equal in status to a selsoviet or an urban-type settlement of district significance, but is organized around a town (as opposed to a rural locality or an urban-type settlement); often with surrounding rural territories.

== Background ==
Prior to the adoption of the 1993 Constitution of Russia, this type of administrative division was defined on the whole territory of the Russian SFSR as an inhabited locality which serves as a cultural and an industrial center of a district and has a population of at least 12,000, of which at least 80% are workers, public servants, and the members of their families. After the adoption of the 1993 Constitution, the administrative-territorial structure of the federal subjects is no longer identified as the responsibility of the federal government or as the joint responsibility of the federal government and the federal subjects. This state of the matters is traditionally interpreted by the governments of the federal subjects as a sign that the matters of the administrative-territorial divisions are the sole responsibility of the federal subjects themselves. As a result, the modern administrative-territorial structures of the federal subjects vary significantly from one federal subject to another; that includes the manner in which the towns of district significance are organized and the choice of a term to refer to such entities.

== As an administrative division ==
As of 2013, the following types of such entities are recognized:

- District town (районный город): in Krasnoyarsk Krai
- Settlement municipal formation (муниципальное образование со статусом поселения): in Leningrad Oblast
- Town (город): in the Republic of Buryatia, the Republic of Kalmykia, and the Sakha Republic; in Krasnodar and Stavropol Krais; in Chelyabinsk, Ivanovo, Kirov, Moscow, Murmansk, and Novosibirsk Oblasts
- Town administration (городская администрация): in the Chechen Republic
- Town of district significance (город районного значения): in the Mari El Republic, the Republic of Mordovia, the Republic of Tatarstan, and the Udmurt Republic; in Altai Krai; in Arkhangelsk, Astrakhan, Kaliningrad, Kemerovo, Kostroma, Kursk, Nizhny Novgorod, Novgorod, Oryol, Penza, Ryazan, Tambov, Ulyanovsk, Volgograd, Vologda, and Yaroslavl Oblasts
- Town of district significance administrative territory (административная территория – город районного значения): in the Komi Republic
- Town under district jurisdiction (город районного подчинения): in the Republic of North Ossetia–Alania; in Kurgan, Lipetsk, and Tula Oblasts
- Town under district jurisdiction (urban settlement) (город кожуунного подчинения (городское поселение): in the Tyva Republic
- Urban administrative okrug (городской административный округ): in Bryansk Oblast
- Urban settlement (городское поселение): in the Chuvash Republic and the Republic of North Ossetia–Alania; in Amur, Rostov, Smolensk, and Voronezh Oblasts

== As an inhabited locality ==
Some federal subjects of Russia, for example the Sakha Republic, also use the term "town of district significance" to refer to a type of an urban locality instead of an administrative division. Confusingly, the Sakha Republic uses the term "town" to refer to a type of an administrative division.

== Sources ==
- Палата Представителей Государственного Собрания (Ил Тумэн) Республики Саха (Якутия). Закон №77-I от 6 июля 1995 г. «Об административно-территориальном устройстве Республики Саха (Якутия)», в ред. Закона №1426-З №407-V от 26 марта 2015 г. «О внесении изменений в статьи 7 и 9 Закона Республики Саха (Якутия) "Об административно-территориальном устройстве Республики Саха (Якутия)"». Опубликован: "Якутские ведомости", №24, 2 августа 1995 г. (House of Representatives of the State Assembly (Il Tumen) of the Sakha (Yakutia) Republic. Law #77-I of July 6, 1995 On the Administrative-Territorial Structure of the Sakha (Yakutia) Republic, as amended by the Law #1426-Z No. 407-V of March 26, 2015 On Amending Articles 7 and 9 of the Law of the Sakha (Yakutia) Republic "On the Administrative-Territorial Structure of the Sakha (Yakutia) Republic". ).
