= List of chairmen of the State Assembly of the Sakha Republic =

Chairmen of the State Assembly of the Sakha Republic.

It was preceded by the Supreme Soviet. The legislature was bicameral 1994-2003 and consisted of the Chamber of the Republic and the House of Representatives.

== Chairmen of the Supreme Soviet ==
Name	Period
Mikhail Nikolayev	April 25, 1990–December 1991
Kliment Ivanov	December 1991–January 1994

== Chairmen of the Chamber of the Republic ==
Name	Period
Egor Larionov	January 1994–1998
Vladimir Filippov	1998–2003

== Chairmen of the House of Representatives ==
Name	Period
A. P. Illarionov	1994–1998
Nikolay Solomov	1998–2003

== Chairmen of the State Assembly of the Sakha Republic ==
Name	Period
Nikolay Solomov	January 23, 2003–May 18, 2005
Nurgun Timofeyev	May 19, 2005–2008
Vitaly Basygysov	March 2008–Present

== Sources ==
- Official website - history
