= Aysen Nikolayev =

Russian politician (born 1972)

- Айсен Николаев
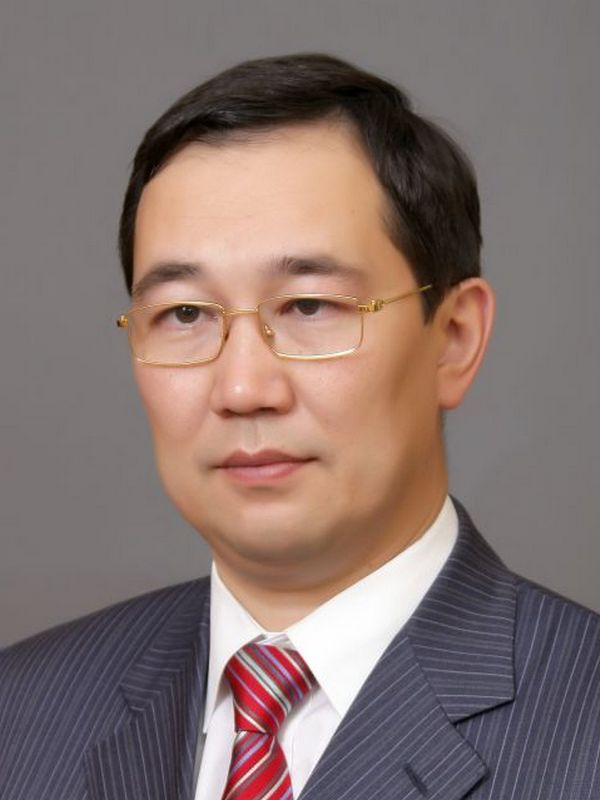
- Official portrait, 2018

4th Head of the Sakha Republic
- Incumbent
- Assumed office 27 September 2018; Acting: 28 May – 27 September 2018
- Preceded by: Yegor Borisov

5th Mayor of Yakutsk
- In office 15 March 2012 – 28 May 2018
- Preceded by: Yury Zabolev
- Succeeded by: Sardana Avksentyeva

Minister of Finance of the Sakha Republic
- In office 29 December 2004 – 31 August 2007
- President: Vyacheslav Shtyrov

Personal details
- Born: 22 January 1972 (age 54) Leningrad, Russian SFSR, Soviet Union
- Party: United Russia
- Other political affiliations: Union of Right Forces
- Spouse: Lyudmila Valerievna Nikolayeva
- Children: 3
- Education: Moscow State University
- Website: aisennikolaev.ru

Aysen Sergeyevich Nikolayev (Note: Russian: Айсен Сергеевич Николаев; Yakut: Сэргэй уола Ньукулаайап Айыы Сиэн, romanized: Sergey uola Ņukulâyap Ayıı Sien) (born 22 January 1972) is a Russian politician who has served as the fourth Head of the Sakha Republic since 2018.

== Early life ==
Nikolayev was born in 1972 in Leningrad, to a family of teachers. He has two brothers and a sister.

At the age of 16, he graduated from the Verkhnevilyuysk Physics and Mathematics School with a gold medal. Nikolayev entered the MSU Faculty of Physics at the Moscow State University. In 1994 he graduated, and in the same year he graduated from the Russian Presidential Academy of National Economy and Public Administration with a degree in Financial Management.

== Political career ==
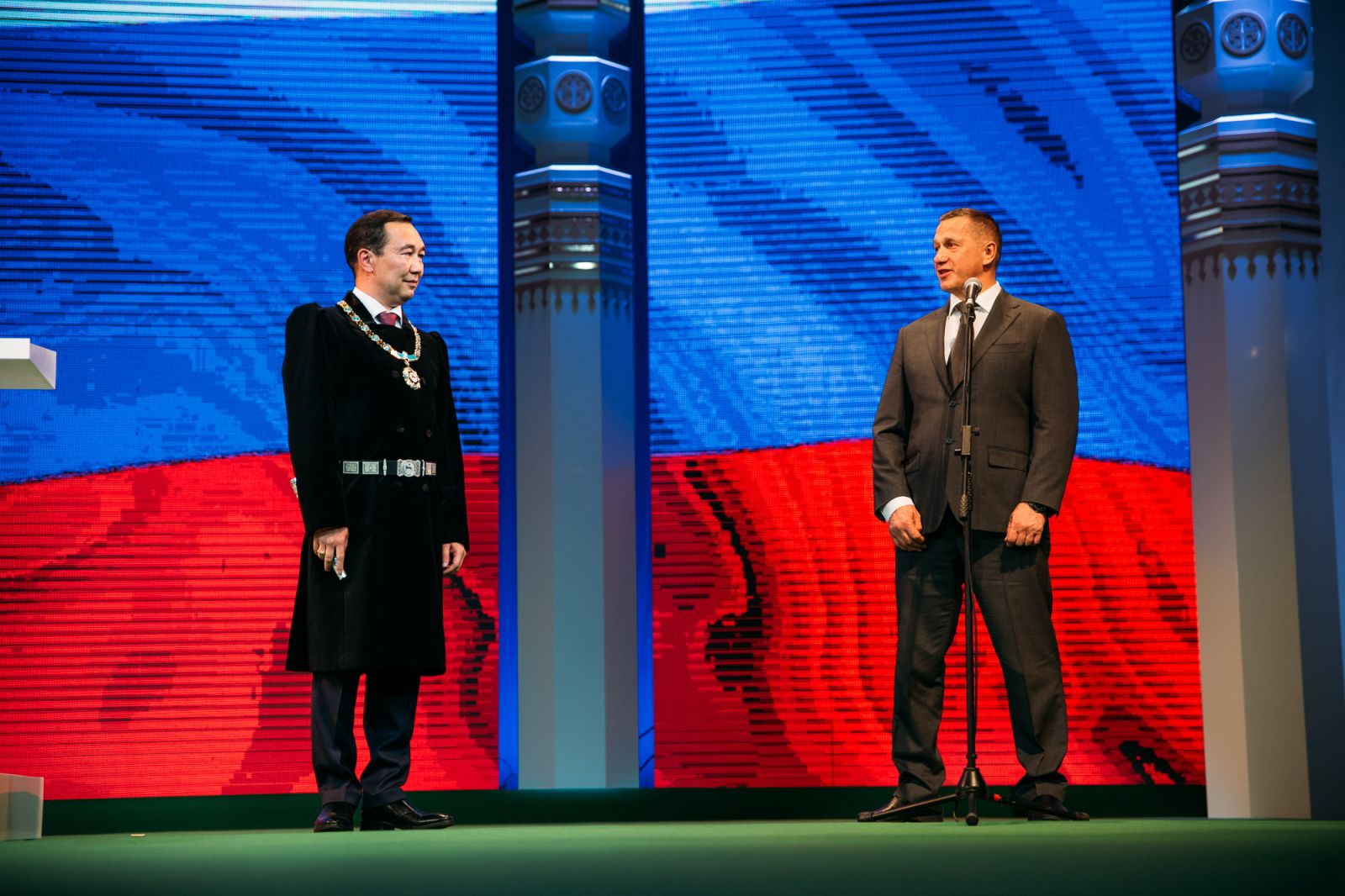
Inauguration of Aysen Nikolayev as the Head of the Sakha Republic (September 2018)

From 1994 to 1995 he headed AOZT SAPI Center. In 1995, Nikolayev became a member of the board of the open joint-stock company Almazergienbank, a commercial bank based in Yakutsk. From 1995 to 1998, he was the deputy chairman of the board of the bank. From 1997 to 2002, he was a deputy of the second convocation of the upper chamber of the State Assembly of the Sakha Republic from the Olenyoksky District.

From 1998 to 2003, he was the chairman of the board of Almazergienbank, as well as the vice president of LLC FK SAPI. On 2002, he was appointed as a deputy of the 3rd convocation of the State Assembly of Yakutia from the Union of Right Forces party, till 2004. On 2004, he was elected as the Minister of Finance of Yakutia. Nikolayev become the head of the Presidential Administration and Government of Yakutia in 2007. On 18 May 2011, he was appointed First Deputy Chairman of the Government of Yakutia.

At the beginning of December 2011, the Yakutsk City Duma appointed the mayoral elections six months earlier - simultaneously with the presidential elections on 4 March 2012, and then on 23 December 2011, Yakutsk Mayor Yuri Zabolev resigned. In January 2012, Aysen Nikolayev was nominated by the United Russia party as a candidate for the mayoral elections in Yakutsk. In the elections held on 4 March 2012, Nikolaev received 47.73% of the votes with a turnout of 69.84%. According to the results of the vote, he was elected head of the administration of the city district of Yakutsk for 5 years.

In the spring of 2017, prior to the appointment of the next elections for the mayor of Yakutsk, the Yakut branch of the United Russia party held primaries of candidates for the election of the head of Yakutsk, in which Nikolayev scored 86%. In the summer of 2017, he was again nominated as a candidate for mayor of Yakutsk. In the 2017 Russian elections, he received 68.4% of the vote and was elected for a second term.

=== Head of the Sakha Republic ===
On 28 May 2018, by the Decree of the President of Russia Vladimir Putin, Nikolayev was appointed as the acting Head of the Sakha Republic. On the 2018 Russian elections, he was elected the Head of the Sakha Republic, gaining 71.40% of the votes cast in the elections. On 27 September 2018, he took office as Head of the Sakha Republic.

From 2 August 2019 to 27 January 2020, he was the member of the Presidium of the State Council of the Russian Federation.

He was re-elected in 2023.

In October 2026, members of the Il Tumen legislature Pavel Petrov and Andrei Nikolayev (no relation) proposed amending Sakha legislature to remove the two-term limit of the Head of the Sakha Republic, which would allow Nikolayev to be re-elected in 2028.

== Sanctions ==
Since July 2022, against the backdrop of the Russian invasion of Ukraine, he has been under sanctions of the British government because he "manages a regional state body of the Russian Federation, which supports or implements actions or policies that undermine or threaten the territorial integrity, sovereignty and independence of Ukraine." In December 2022, the Office of Foreign Assets Control of the United States Department of the Treasury added Nikolayev and 28 other governors of the federal subjects of Russia to the Specially Designated Nationals and Blocked Persons List due to their involvement in the enforcement of the conscription of Russian citizens in response to the mobilization order in September 2022. Nikolayev is also sanctioned by Canada and Ukraine.

== Personal life ==
Nikolayev is married to Lyudmila Valerievna Nikolayeva. She has worked in executive positions in diamond mining companies since 2005. They have three children.

Since 2010. Nikolayev has also served as the President of the Equestrian Federation of the Republic of Sakha. He is also the member of the Political Council of the regional branch of United Russia.

== Awards ==
- "Honorary Citizen of Yakutsk" (September 10, 2022)
- Order of Friendship (March 21, 2022) - for great contribution to the socio-economic development of the Republic of Sakha (Yakutia)
- Order of the Holy Prince Alexander Nevsky (January 22, 2022)
