= Vyacheslav Shtyrov =

Former President of the Sakha Republic (born 1953)

- Вячеслав Штыров
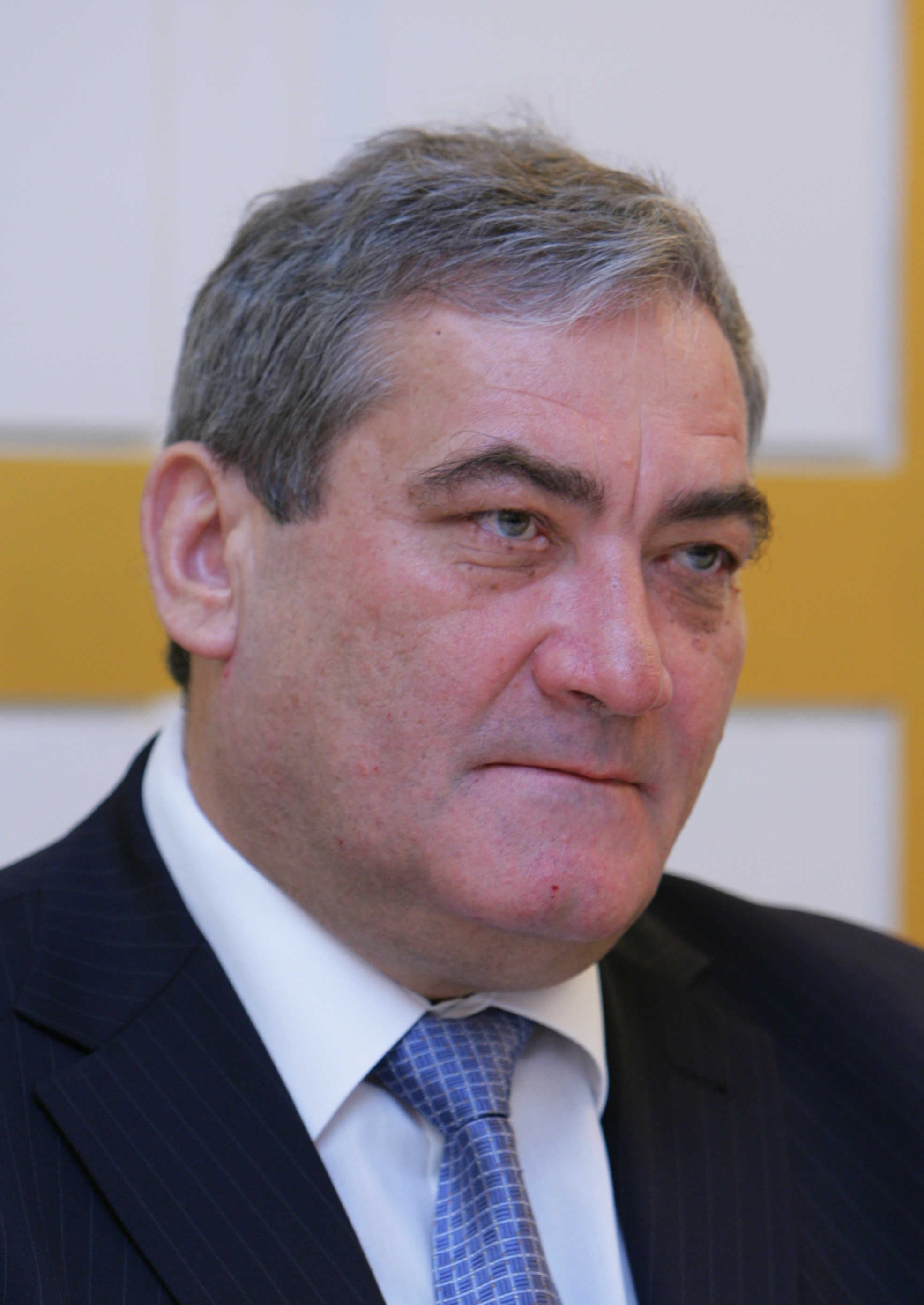
- Shtyrov in 2007

Russian Federation Senator from the Republic of Sakha (Yakutia)
- In office 23 June 2010 – 28 September 2018
- Preceded by: Mikhail Nikolayev
- Succeeded by: Yegor Borisov

2nd President of the Republic of Sakha
- In office 27 January 2002 – 31 May 2010
- Vice President: Alexander Akimov (2002–07); Yevgeniya Mikhaylova (2007–10)
- Preceded by: Mikhail Nikolayev
- Succeeded by: Yegor Borisov

Vice President of the Republic of Sakha
- In office 20 December 1991 – 1997
- Preceded by: Office created
- Succeeded by: Spartak Borisov

Personal details
- Born: 23 May 1953 (age 72) Khandyga, Tomponsky ulus, Yakut ASSR
- Party: United Russia (2007–Present)
- Spouse: Lidiya Ivanovna Shtyrova
- Children: 2

Vyacheslav Anatolyevich Shtyrov (Russian: Вячеслав Анатольевич Штыров; born 23 May 1953) is a Russian businessman who ran the diamond mining giant Almazy Rossii – Sakha (Alrosa) from 1996 to 2002. In 2004 it was reported that he owns 0.14% of Alrosa.

Born on 23 May 1953 in Khandyga village, Tomponsky District, Yakut Autonomous Republic. Ethnically Russian. His father was counter admiral Anatoly Tikhonovich Shtyrov (1929–2014), First Deputy Chief of Intelligence of the Pacific Fleet, Deputy Chief of the Naval Directorate of the South-West Command. In 1975 Vyacheslav graduated from the Far Eastern State Technical University. After graduating, he was sent to work in the Construction Department "Gokstroy" of VilyuyGESstroy of the USSR Ministry of Energy. He spent 11 years at Gokstroy, moving to the post of deputy director.

From 1986 to 1988, he was Deputy Head of the Construction Department of the Yakutia Regional Committee of the CPSU. In 1991, he was appointed Minister of Construction and Investments of Yakutia.

From 1991 to 1997, Shtyrov served as Vice President of the Republic of Sakha (Yakutia) under Mikhail Nikolayev. From 1992 to December 1994, he combined the posts of Vice President and Chairman of the Government of Sakha. In 1995, he became the director of Diamonds of Russia — Sakha JSC, which was renamed into Alrosa a year later. In 2002, Shtyrov was elected second president of Sakha and left Alrosa.

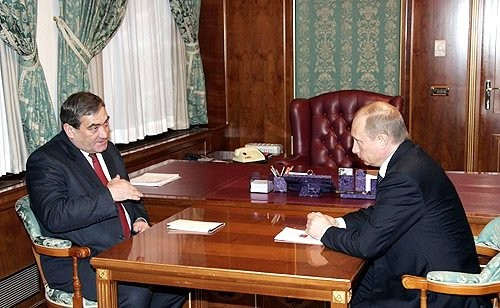
With Vladimir Putin, 6 January 2006

He took office on 27 January 2002 after being elected in an election which took two rounds. He received 52.25% of the vote in the runoff. He left office on 31 May 2010 for personal reasons. Later he became a Deputy Chairman of the Federation Council at the Federal Assembly of the Russian Federation.

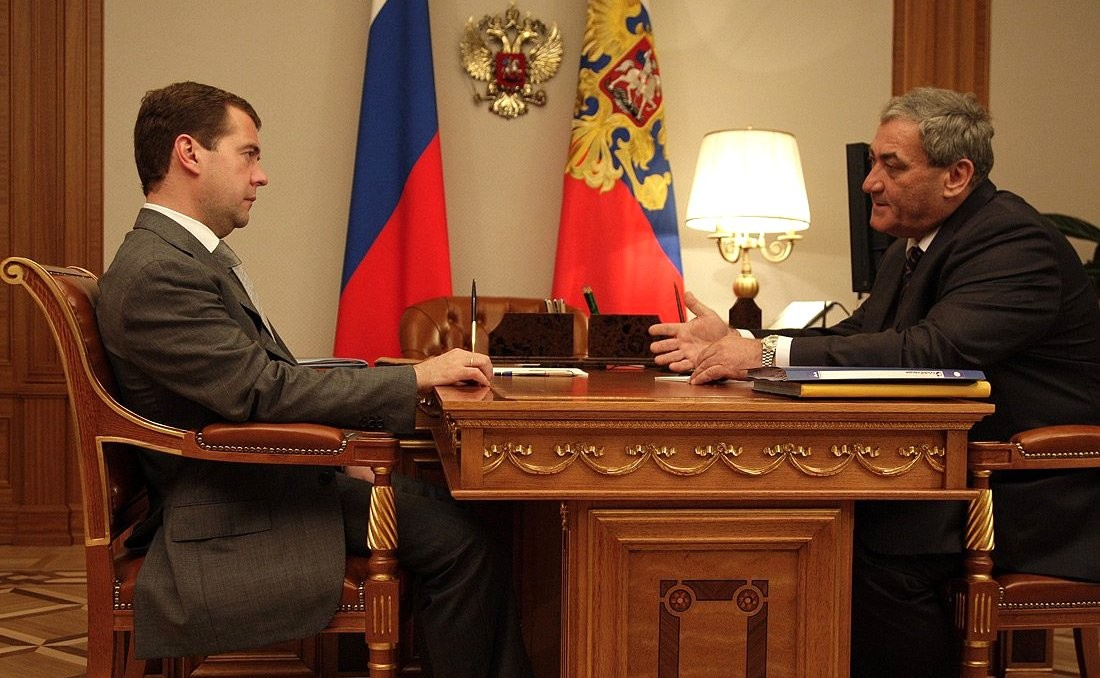
With Dmitry Medvedev on Bocharov Ruchei, 12 August 2009

== Family ==
Shtyrov is married to Liliya Ivanovna Shtyrova, They have two daughters. Yuliya and Tatiana.

== Wealth ==
In 2004, his wealth was estimated to be $410 million (12.5 Billion Rubles).

Preceded by Mikhail Nikolayev	President of the Sakha Republic; 2002–2010	Succeeded by Yegor Borisov
