= Fedot Tumusov =

Russian politician

Fedot Tumusov MP
- Федот Тумусов
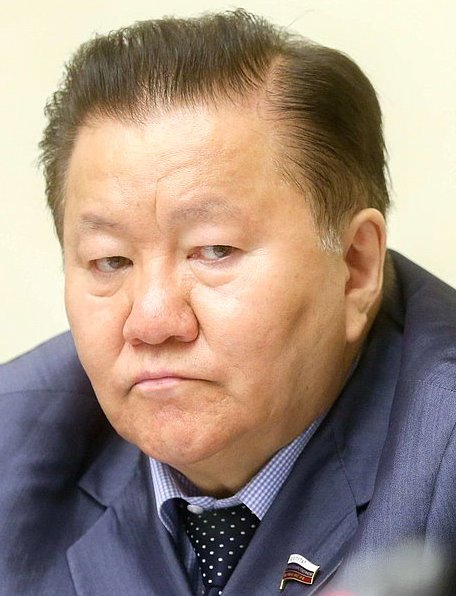

Member of the State Duma (Party List Seat)
- Incumbent
- Assumed office 12 October 2021
- In office 24 December 2007 – 5 October 2016

Member of the State Duma for the Republic of Sakha (Yakutia)
- In office 5 October 2016 – 12 October 2021
- Preceded by: constituency re-established
- Succeeded by: Petr Ammosov
- Constituency: Yakutia-at-large (No. 24)

Personal details
- Born: 30 June 1955 (age 71) Verkhnevilyuysky District, Yakut ASSR, USSR
- Party: A Just Russia — For Truth
- Education: Novosibirsk State University of Architecture and Civil Engineering

Fedot Semenovich Tumusov (Russian: Федот Семёнович Тумусов; born 30 June 1955, Urgench, Xorazm Region) is a Russian political figure and a deputy of the 5th, 6th, 7th, and 8th State Dumas.

From 1987 to 1989, Tumusov was an instructor of the Yakut branch of the Regional Committee of the Communist Party of the Soviet Union. From 1991 to 1993, he was the Chairman of the Permanent Commission of the Supreme Council of the Republic of Sakha (Yakutia) for the introduction of market relations and entrepreneurship. He also worked as an advisor to the Head of the Sakha Republic Mikhail Nikolayev. From 1993 to 2003, he was the president of the Sakhaalmazprofinvest fund that aimed to create effective mechanisms for solving socio-economic and environmental problems of the republic. From 2002 to 2007, he was the deputy of the State Assembly of the Sakha Republic of the 3rd and 4th convocations. In 2007, he was elected deputy of the 5th State Duma. In 2011, 2016, and 2021, Tumusov was re-elected for the 6th, 7th, and 8th State Dumas.

== Sanctions ==
He was sanctioned by the UK government in 2022 in relation to the Russo-Ukrainian War.
