= Petr Ammosov =

Russian politician (born 1966)

- Пётр Аммосов
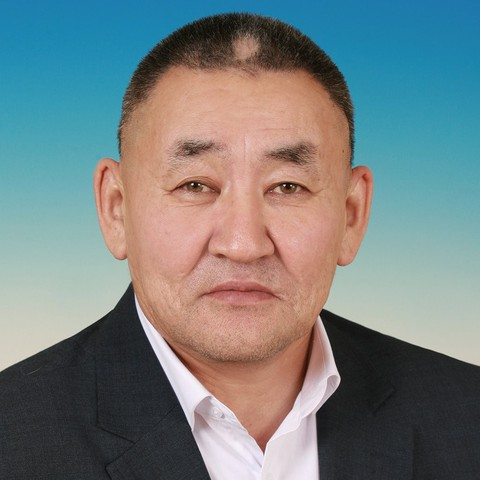
- official portrait, circa 2021

Member of the State Duma
- In office 12 October 2021 – 30 September 2026
- Preceded by: Fedot Tumusov
- Succeeded by: Pyotr Shamayev
- Constituency: Yakutia-at-large (No. 24)

Personal details
- Born: 22 September 1966 (age 60) Yakutsk, Yakut ASSR, RSFSR, USSR
- Party: Communist Party of the Russian Federation
- Education: Omsk State Agrarian University

Petr Revoldovich Ammosov (Russian: Пётр Револьдович Аммосов; born 22 September 1966, Yakutsk) is a Russian politician who was a deputy of the 8th State Duma.

From 1984 to 1987, Ammosov served at the Soviet Armed Forces. From 1990 to 1993, he worked as an excavator driver in Ust-Aldansky District. From 1995 to 1996, he was the leading specialist of the Ust-Aldansky uluskomzem. From 1999 to 2001, he was the chief specialist of the Oymyakon mezhraykomzem. In 2001–2004, Ammosov was the leading specialist of the Committee for Land Resources and Land Management in Sakha. From 2008 to 2009, he was the acting head of the personnel management service of the administration of the Verkhnekolymsky District. In 2010, Ammosov became the senior referent of the Standing Committee on the Problems of the Arctic and Indigenous Minorities of the North of the State Assembly of the Sakha Republic. He left the post in 2013 to become People's Deputy of the State Assembly of the Sakha Republic of the 5th and 6th convocations. In November 2014, he was elected secretary of the Yakut Republican Committee of the Communist Party of the Russian Federation. Since September 2021, he has served as deputy of the 8th State Duma from the Omsk Oblast constitution.

In 2020, the representatives of the Communist Party of the Russian Federation decided to expel Ammosov from the party due to his publicly expressed sexist statement. However, as he won the elections, the party decided to postpone the expulsion.

== Sanctions ==
He was sanctioned by the UK government in 2022 in relation to the Russo-Ukrainian War.
