= Spartak Borisov =

Russian politician (1936–2022)

- Спартак Борисов

Vice President of the Sakha Republic
- In office 1997 – 21 January 2002
- President: Mikhail Nikolayev
- Preceded by: Vyacheslav Shtyrov
- Succeeded by: Aleksandr Akimov

Mayor of Yakutsk
- In office 1995–1997
- Preceded by: Alexey Tomtosov
- Succeeded by: Ilya Mikhalchuk

Personal details
- Born: 22 November 1936 Olyokminsk, Yakut ASSR, Russian SFSR, Soviet Union
- Died: 22 March 2022 (aged 85) Moscow, Russia

Spartak Stepanovich Borisov (Russian: Спартак Степанович Борисов; 22 November 1936 – 23 March 2022) was a Russian politician, businessman, construction worker, and developer. He served as the mayor of Yakutsk, the capital city of the Sakha (Yakutia), from 1995 to 1997. Borisov also served as Vice President of Sakha from 1998 until 2002 under the-then Head of the Sakha Republic, Mikhail Nikolayev. (The office of vice president of Sakha was later abolished in 2014).

== Biography ==
Borisov was born on 22 November 1936, in Olyokminsk, Yakut Autonomous Soviet Socialist Republic (YASSR).

During the Soviet era, Borisov became one of the most prominent industrial builders in the Yakut Autonomous Soviet Socialist Republic, now the present-day Sakha (Yakutia). He also served as a deputy in the Supreme Soviet of the Yakut Autonomous Soviet Socialist Republic and as a delegate to the 28th Congress of the Communist Party of the Soviet Union in 1990, the last before the dissolution of the Soviet Union.

In 1995, Borisov was elected Mayor of Yakutsk, an office he held from 1995 until 1997. Borisov focused on infrastructure and chronic housing shortages during his tenure as mayor. Under his administration, the number of residents on the waiting list for housing was reduced from 12,000 people to 5,700 by the time he left office. Borisov oversaw the construction of more than six thousand new apartment units throughout the city. Two new residential microdistricts were built in Yakutsk, which were nicknamed "Borisovki" by residents. Borisov also added sewer service, water, utilities, and a heating unit to the city's Novoportovsky settlement.

Borisov became Vice President of the Sakha Republic in 1997. As vice president, he headed the Sakha Republic Public Committee on Human Rights which oversaw the appeals of more than 1,800 citizens concerning such issues as public utilities. His committee also reviewed criminal cases and the reduction of prison sentences.

In his later years, Borisov and his family relocated to Moscow. He suffered from declining health, including a broken leg and several surgeries. Spartak Borisov died from a serious illness in Moscow on 23 March 2022, at the age of 85.

Borisov's funeral was held in Moscow on 28 March 2022. He was buried in Saint Petersburg.

== Honors ==
- Soviet Union
  - Order of the Red Banner of Labour, three-time recipient
  - Order of Friendship of Peoples
  - Order "For Merit to the Fatherland", 4th class
  - Honored Builder of the RSFSR and the Yakut ASSR
