= Yegor Borisov =

Former President of the Sakha Republic

- Егор Борисов
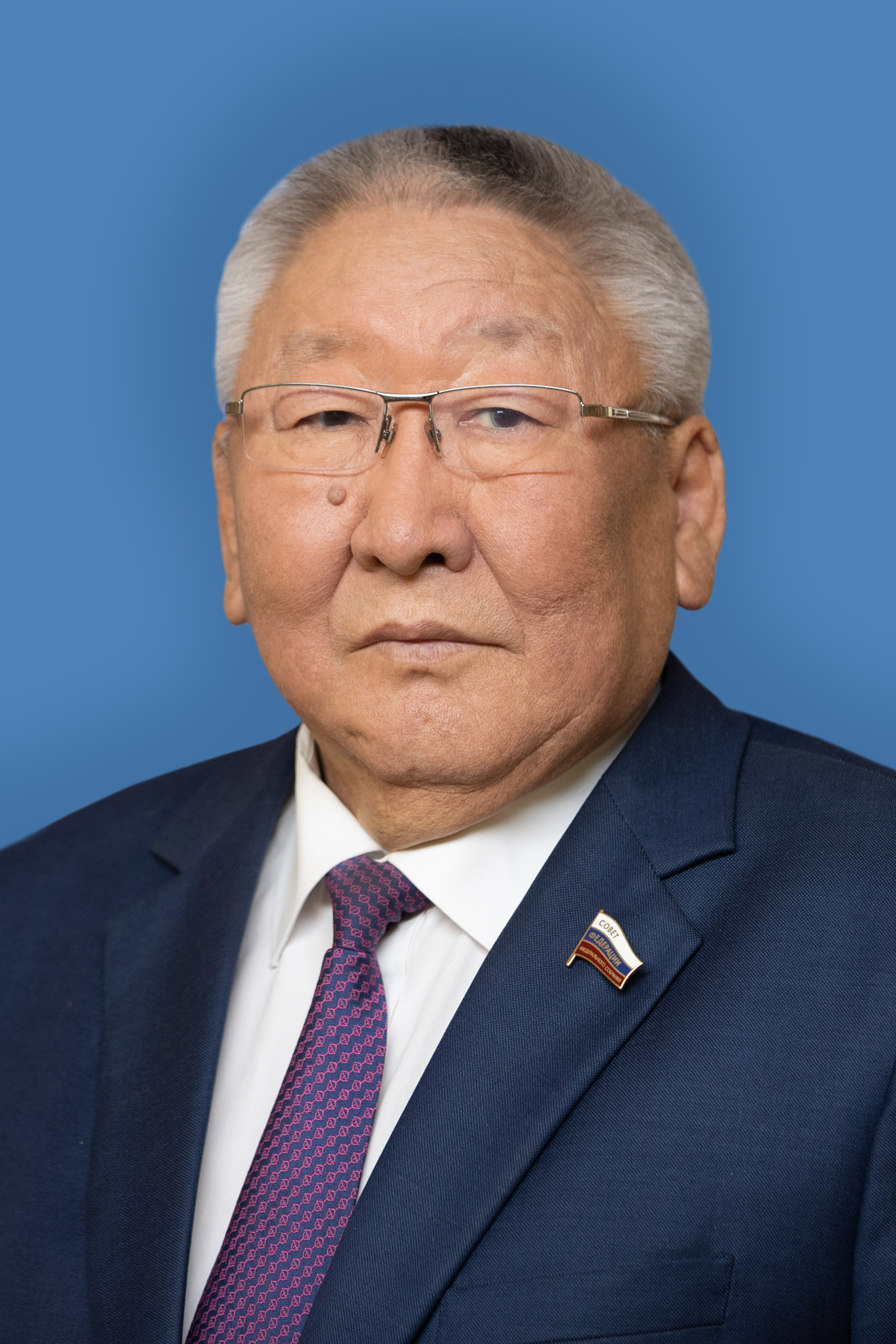
- Official portrait, 2016

Russian Federation Senator from the Republic of Sakha (Yakutia)
- Incumbent
- Assumed office 28 September 2018
- Preceded by: Vyacheslav Shtyrov

3rd Head of the Sakha Republic
- In office 31 May 2010 – 28 May 2018 (Officially known as President of the Sakha Republic until 24 April 2014)
- Preceded by: Vyacheslav Shtyrov
- Succeeded by: Aysen Nikolaev

Personal details
- Born: 15 August 1954 (age 71) Churapcha, Russian SFSR, Soviet Union
- Party: United Russia
- Spouse: Praskovya Borisova
- Children: 2
- Profession: Mechanical Engineer
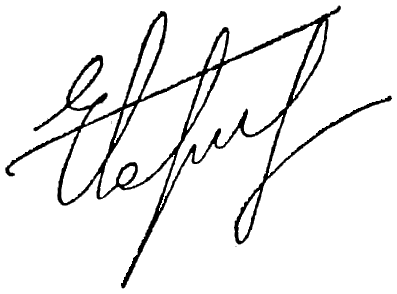
- Signature

Yegor Afanasyevich Borisov (Russian: Егор Афанасьевич Борисов; born 15 August 1954) is a Russian politician of Yakut ethnicity. Since May 2018, he has served as an advisor to the government of the Sakha Republic. Previously, he was the governor of the Sakha Republic from 2010 to 2018 and the prime minister of the republic from 2003 to 2010.

== Biography ==
=== Early life ===
Borisov was born in Churapcha District, on 15 August 1954 to ethnic Yakut parents, to a family of eight children. His father, Afanasiy Borisov, worked as a poor farmer and mechanic, and struggled financially through Soviet times, while his mother, Praskovya Borisova, worked as a Nurse in Kindergarten school. When Borisov was 12, he said that his father took him hunting in the Taba area, located approximately in 20 kilometers to the west of Churapcha District. His father died of natural causes at the age of 41. From 1971, Borisov joined as a worker at Agricultural Equipment shop to help him survive financially. From early childhood, Borisov was attracted to engineering, and eventually studied engineering at university, graduating with a Bachelors in Mechanical Engineering in 1979. Upon graduation from university, Borisov became the head of the shop he worked in, and ended up joining the Communist Party, where he then became the Deputy Chief of Churapcha Regional Administration of Agriculture. After the collapse of the Soviet Union, Borisov joined the politics of Yakutia.

=== Political career ===
After the fall of the Soviet Union, Borisov, who had a background in the agricultural sector served as a corporate manager for agricultural concerns as well as a deputy minister and minister for agriculture in the region.

In August 2001, he was elected as a deputy to the regional assembly and became the first deputy prime minister for that body in 2002. In 2003, he became the prime minister of the republic.

In May 2010, Governor Vyacheslav Shtyrov stepped down to take a seat on the Federation Council and Russian President Dmitry Medvedev appointed Borisov as the acting governor. The republic’s assembly confirmed him in the post in June and he formally became the president of the republic.

In April 2014, President Vladimir Putin accepted Borisov’s request to step down from his post and agreed to end his mandate ahead of term. Putin simultaneously appointed Borisov to be Acting President until an elected president took office. He was previously Prime Minister of the Sakha Republic. Borisov stood as a candidate in the election winning with nearly 59% of the vote.

In May 2018, he resigned as president of the Sakha Republic and assumed the role as an advisor to the government.

== Sanctions ==
He was sanctioned by the UK government in 2022 in relation to the Russo-Ukrainian War.

== Personal life ==
Borisov is married to Praskovya Petrovna, and they have two daughters. Both of Borisov's daughters graduated from Yakutsk State University. One of his daughters is an economist and the other one is a psychologist. Borisov loves hunting and fishing, and martial arts. He also likes reading historical literature and is a fan of the music of the Sakha Republic

== Awards ==
- Order “For Merit to the Fatherland,” 4th class (23 June 2014) — for labor achievements, significant contribution to the socio-economic development of the Russian Federation, implementation of the foreign policy of the Russian Federation, merits in the humanitarian sphere, strengthening of legality, protection of citizens’ rights and interests, many years of conscientious work, and active legislative activity
- Medal “For the Promotion of the Rescue Cause” (EMERCOM of Russia, 2016)
- Honorary Badge “For Merits in the Development of Physical Culture and Sports” (30 October 2013) — for a major personal contribution to the development of physical culture and sports in the Russian Federation, the promotion of a healthy lifestyle, and in connection with the 90th anniversary of the establishment of federal (state) and territorial executive bodies in the field of physical culture and sports
- Order of Saint Equal-to-the-Apostles Grand Prince Vladimir, 1st class (2010)

| Preceded by Vyacheslav Shtyrov | President of the Sakha Republic; 31 May 2010 – 24 April 2014 | Office abolished |
| New title | Head of the Sakha Republic; 24 April 2014 – 28 May 2018 | Succeeded by Aysen Nikolaev |
