= Zoya Kornilova =

Russian politician (1939–2025)

Zoya Afanasyevna Kornilova (Russian: Зоя Афанасьевна Корнилова; 22 May 1939 – 5 March 2025) was a Russian politician who served as a member of the State Duma from 1995 to 1999. Kornilova died on 5 March 2025, at the age of 85.
