= Sakhamin Afanasyev =

Russian politician

- Сахамин Афанасьев
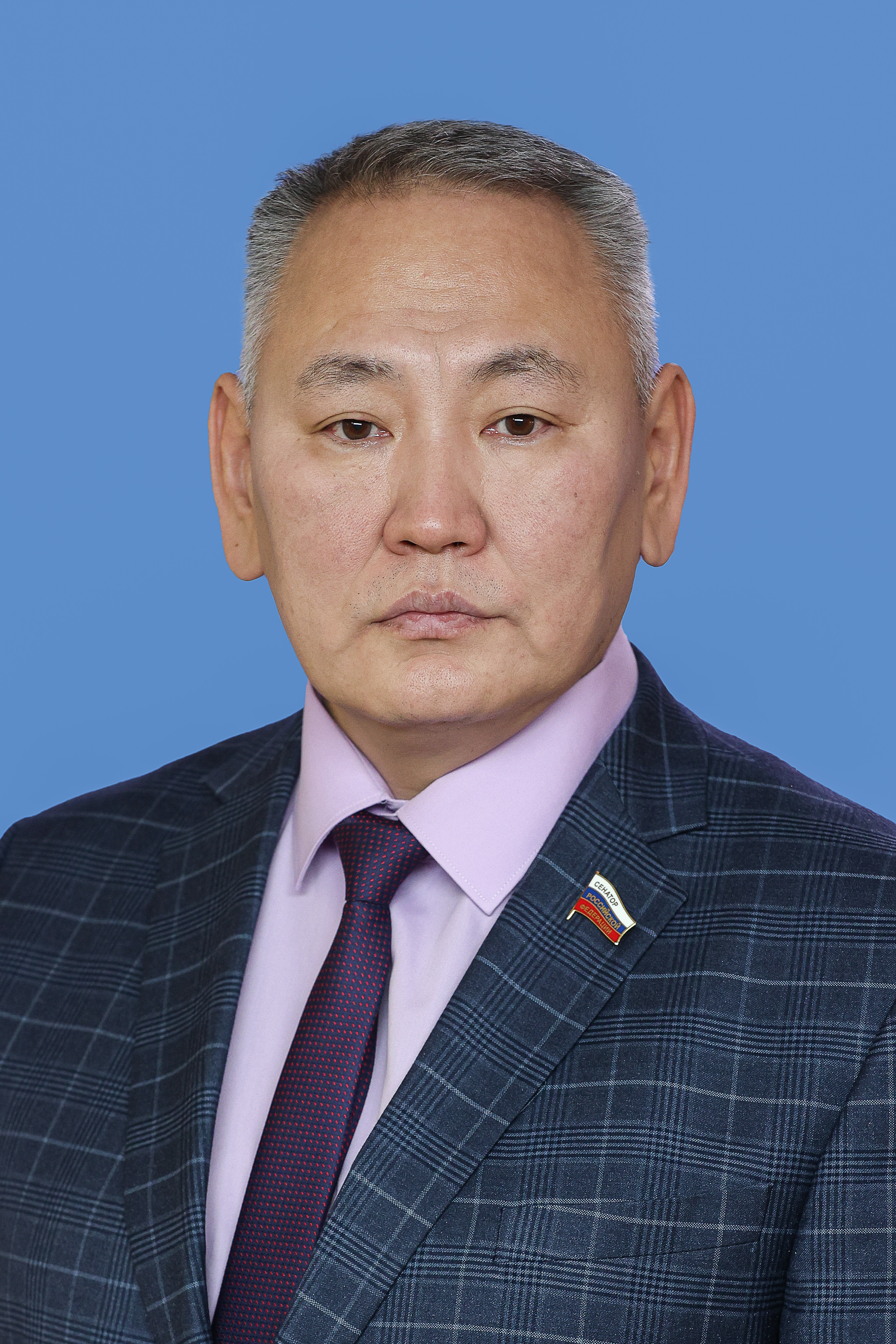

Senator from Sakha Republic
- Incumbent
- Assumed office 4 October 2023
- Preceded by: Aleksandr Akimov

Personal details
- Born: 16 November 1973 (age 52) Verkhnevilyuysk, RSFSR, Soviet Union
- Party: United Russia
- Education: Irkutsk State Technical University; Far Eastern Institute of Public Administration; Russian Presidential Academy of National Economy and Public Administration

Sakhamin Milanovich Afanasyev (Russian: Сахамин Миланович Афанасьев; born November 16, 1973, Verkhnevilyuysk, Yakut ASSR) is a Russian politician, Senator of the Federation Council from the State Assembly of the Sakha Republic (Yakutia) since 2023. Deputy Chairman of the Federation Council Committee on Federal Structure, Regional Policy, Local Self-Government and Northern Affairs. He is a member of United Russia party.

== Biography ==
Born in Verkhnevilyuysk, Yakut Autonomous Soviet Socialist Republic, in 1998 he graduated from the Irkutsk State Technical University with a degree in environmental protection and rational use of natural resources (qualifying as an environmental engineer). In 2003, he graduated from the Far Eastern Institute of Public Administration with a degree in public and municipal administration. In 2019, he graduated from the Russian Presidential Academy of National Economy and Public Administration (specialist in public and municipal administration).

From 2021 to 2023, he was a deputy of the State Assembly of the Sakha Republic of the 6th convocation. He was elected on September 19, 2021, in a by-election in Kolyma-Indigirka single-mandate constituency No. 34 (running as a United Russia candidate and receiving 44.97% of the vote). In the Yakutia parliament, he chaired the standing committee on land relations, natural resources, and ecology. On September 10, 2023, he was elected as a deputy of the State Assembly of Yakutia of the 7th convocation from the United Russia party in Kolyma-Indigirka single-mandate constituency No. 34 (63.83%). He resigned his parliamentary powers due to his transfer to the Federation Council.

On October 4, 2023, the republic's parliament granted Sakhamin Afanasyev the powers of a senator—a representative of the legislative body of Sakha (Yakutia). He replaced Aleksandr Akimov in the Federation Council.
