= Head of the Sakha Republic =

Highest-ranking official in Sakha, Russia

- Саха Өрөспүүбүлүкэтин Ил Дархана (Yakut); Глава Республики Саха (Якутия) (Russian)
- Standard of the head of the republic

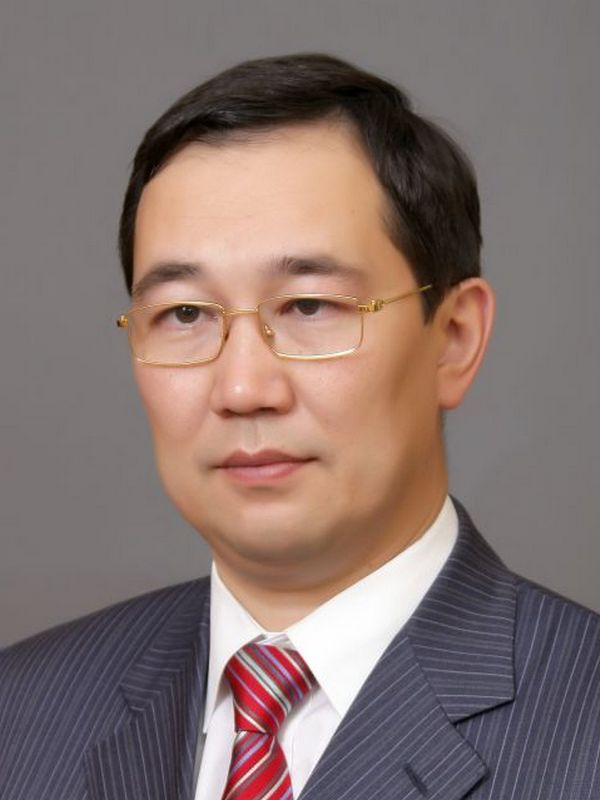
- Incumbent; Aysen Nikolayev since 28 May 2018
- Executive branch of the Sakha Republic
- Style: His Excellency; The Honorable
- Type: Governor; Head of state; Head of government
- Residence: Yakutsk
- Nominator: Political parties
- Appointer: Direct elections
- Term length: 5 years
- Formation: 17 October 1991
- First holder: Mikhail Nikolayev
- Website: Official website

The Head of the Sakha Republic (Russian: Глава Республики Саха (Якутия), romanized: Glava Respubliki Sakha (Yakutia); Yakut: Саха Өрөспүүбүлүкэтин Ил Дархана; Ил Дархан, romanized: Saxa Öröspüübülüketin İl Darxana; İl Darxan) is the highest office in the Sakha Republic. The term of office is five years.

== History ==
The office was first introduced in 1991. Before April 2014 it was known as the President of the Sakha Republic (Note: Russian: Президент Республики Саха (Якутия); Yakut: Саха Республикатын Президент.).

The first presidential elections in Yakutia were on 20 December 1991. Yakutia inherited the Soviet electoral system with no real multi-party system to be established. There were only two candidates in the election. The chairman of the Supreme Soviet of the Yakut ASSR Mikhail Nikolayev won with 76.7% of the vote. Nikolayev was reelected in 1996 and succeeded by his former vice president Vyacheslav Shtyrov in January 2002. Five years later Shtyrov's appointment for second term which was proposed by President Vladimir Putin was approved by the State Assembly of Yakutia. After his resignation in May 2010 President of Russia Dmitry Medvedev appointed prime minister of the region Yegor Borisov as acting president. He was inaugurated on 17 June 2010. Since the beginning of Borisov's second term in 2014 the President of the Republic of Sakha (Yakutia) became known as the Head of the Republic.

== List of office-holders ==
No.	Portrait	Name (born–died)	Term of office			Political party	Elected	Vice president	Ref.
No.	Portrait	Name (born–died)	Took office	Left office	Time in office	Political party	Elected	Vice president	Ref.
1		Mikhail Nikolayev (1937–2023)	27 December 1991	21 January 2002	10 years, 25 days	Independent	1991	Vyacheslav Shtyrov (1991–1997)	
1		Mikhail Nikolayev (1937–2023)	27 December 1991	21 January 2002	10 years, 25 days	Independent	1996	Spartak Borisov (1997–2002)	
2		Vyacheslav Shtyrov (born 1953)	27 January 2002	31 May 2010	8 years, 124 days	Independent	2001–02	Aleksandr Akimov (2002–2007)	
2		Vyacheslav Shtyrov (born 1953)	27 January 2002	31 May 2010	8 years, 124 days	United Russia	2006	Yevgeniya Mikhaylova (2007–2010)	
–		Yegor Borisov (born 1954)	31 May 2010	17 June 2010	17 days	United Russia	– (Note: Acting head of the republic)	Dmitry Glushko (2010–2014)	
3		Yegor Borisov (born 1954)	17 June 2010	24 April 2014	3 years, 311 days	United Russia	2010	Dmitry Glushko (2010–2014)	
–		Yegor Borisov (born 1954)	24 April 2014	27 September 2014	156 days	United Russia	–	Position abolished	
(3)		Yegor Borisov (born 1954)	27 September 2014	28 May 2018	3 years, 235 days	United Russia	2014	Position abolished	
–		Aysen Nikolayev (born 1972)	28 May 2018	27 September 2018	122 days	United Russia	–	Position abolished	
4		Aysen Nikolayev (born 1972)	27 September 2018	Incumbent	7 years, 345 days	United Russia	2018	Position abolished	
4		Aysen Nikolayev (born 1972)	27 September 2018	Incumbent	7 years, 345 days	United Russia	2023	Position abolished	

The most recent election for the office was held on 10 September 2023.
