= Sardana Avksentyeva =

Russian politician (born 1970)

Sardana Avksentyeva MP
- Сардана Авксентьева
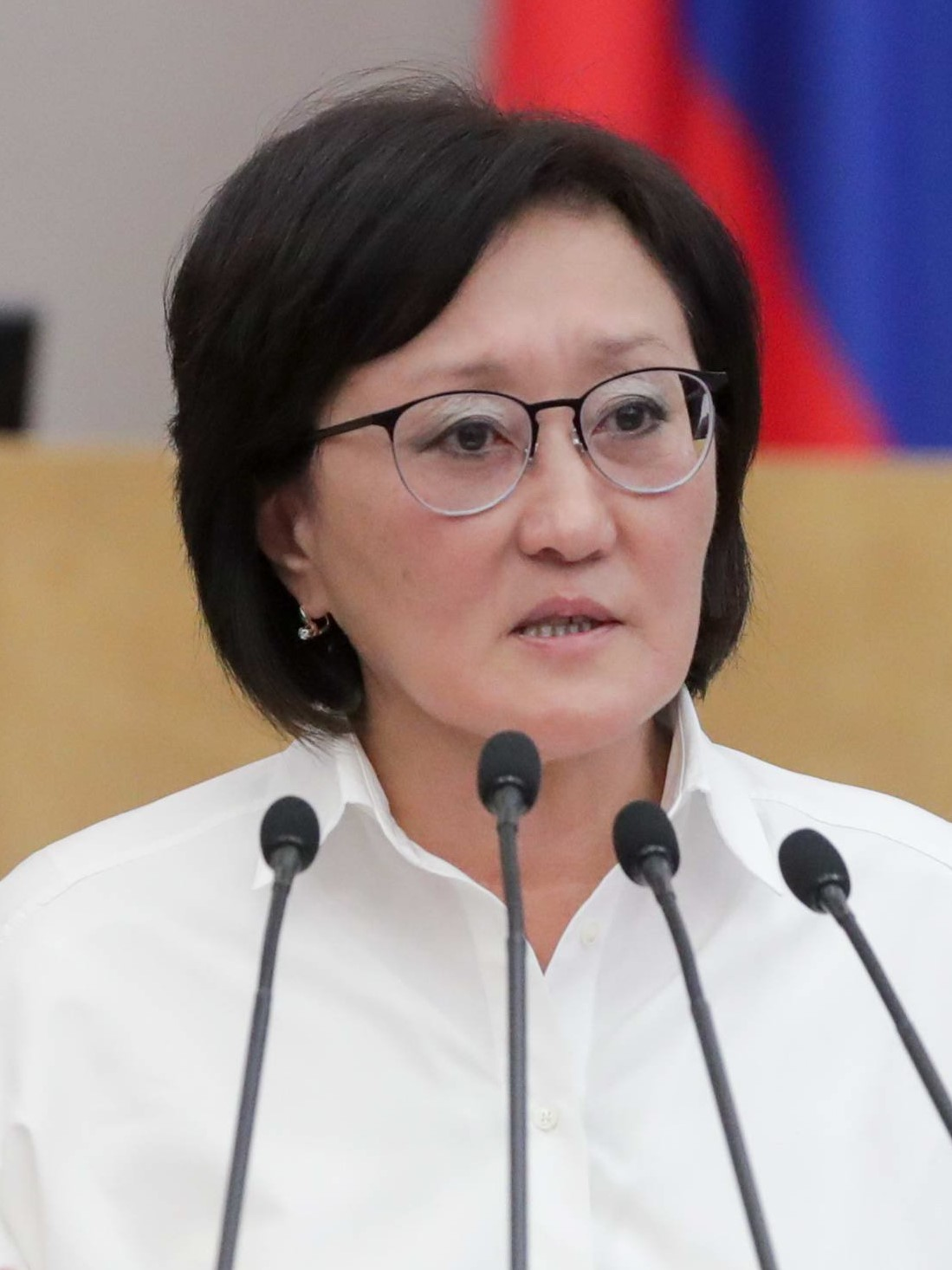
- Avksentyeva in 2021

Member of the State Duma (Party List Seat)
- Incumbent
- Assumed office 12 October 2021

6th Mayor of Yakutsk
- In office 17 September 2018 – 14 January 2021
- Preceded by: Aysen Nikolayev
- Succeeded by: Yevgeny Grigoryev

Personal details
- Born: Sardana Vladimirovna Gogoleva; 2 July 1970 (age 56) Churapcha, Yakut ASSR, Russian SFSR, USSR
- Party: New People (since 2021); United Russia (2018-2021); Party of Russia's Rebirth (2018)
- Spouse: Viktor Avksentyev
- Children: 5
- Education: Yakutsk State University (1993); Far Eastern Institute of Management (1998)

Sardana Vladimirovna Avksentyeva (née Gogoleva, Russian: Сардана Владимировна Авксентьева, Yakut: Сардаана Владимир кыыһа Авксентьева, romanized: Sardaana Vladimir kııha Avksentyeva, born 2 July 1970) is a Russian politician, who served as the mayor of Yakutsk, the capital of the Republic of Sakha (Yakutia) from 2018 to 2021.

== Early life ==
Sardana Avksentyeva was born on 2 July 1970 in Churapcha, 177 km east of Yakutsk. She graduated from the Faculty of History and Law of the M. K. Ammosov Yakutsk State University (modern North-Eastern Federal University) in 1993 as history teacher, and the Far Eastern Academy of Public Administration in 1998 with a degree in State and Municipal Administration.

From 1993 to 1996 she worked as a specialist in the department for youth affairs, physical culture and sports of Yakutsk City Administration, becoming head of a department of the Ministry of Youth Affairs, Tourism, Physical Culture and Sports of Yakutia in 1996. From 1998 to 2000 Avksentyeva worked as the head of the department of organizational and personnel work at the Sakha National Broadcasting Company. In 2000 she was appointed assistant to the deputy of the State Duma Vitaly Basygysov. From 2004 to 2007, she worked as Deputy General Director of OJSC Tuymaada Diamond.

From 2007 to 2012 she worked as chief of staff of Yakutsk City Administration and deputy for the mayor Yury Zabolev from the United Russia party. Avksentyeva previously headed Zabolev's election headquarters. Since 2012 she was director of the production and commercial complex "Aerotorgservice" of Yakutsk Airport.

== 2018 Mayoral election ==
In September 2018 she was elected the mayor of Yakutsk from the minor "Party of Russia's Rebirth", while remaining non-partisan. She won with 39.98%, ahead of Alexander Savvinov of the United Russia party, who received 31.70% of the vote.

Sardana Avksentyeva became the first woman to assume the post of mayor of Yakutsk. In an interview for Meduza, Avksentyeva stated that she decided to try her hand at the suggestion of the Rodina nominee Vladimir Fyodorov, who was forced to withdraw his candidacy. The main sponsor of Avksentyeva's campaign was the Utum group of companies and its founder Vasily Gogolev, who had previously supported Fydorov.

== Mayoralty ==
In the first year of her tenure, in order to save budgetary funds, Avksentyeva put up the official cars of administration employees for auction, cut the costs of holidays and other events, external and public relations, the reception of delegations. Subsequently, the mayor's office was unable to sell its off-road vehicles. Instead of a portrait of Vladimir Putin, common for Russian local authorities' offices, Avksentyeva placed a photograph of people celebrating the Yakut summer holiday Yhyakh in her office.

In March 2020 the incident with the mass killing of animals with rabies at the animal transfer station in Yakutsk sparked outrage among animal rights activists. Avksentyeva proposed to the deputies of the Yakutsk City Duma to introduce a tax on pet owners and to use the collected funds for the capture and sterilization of stray animals. She cited as an example the European countries, where "animals are treated as luxury goods, and there is corresponding taxation on it."

In July 2020 Avksentyeva voted against the amendments to the Constitution and initially did not announce her vote. However, a fake photo began to circulate in social networks, in which someone drew a checkmark in the “for” column in the official's bulletin. Avksentyeva's press secretary Alexey Tolstyakov published the original photo in which the mayor voted against. In November 2020, she stated that she supports some of the amendments, including the "zeroing" of Vladimir Putin's presidential terms.

In November 2020 Avksentyeva initiated the sale of the mayor's office building planning to place the new one on the outskirts of the city. Also she announced the administration's refusal from official cars in favor of taxi. The statement was received ambiguously. Most of the townspeople took the idea with hostility, and political scientists considered it a PR stunt.

In 2020 the half of Yakutsk residents assessed activities of Avksentyeva's administration throughout the year negatively, and only 42% positively. Avksentieva's personal rating fell: at the end of the year, only 23% of the poll participants agree to name her the most competent female politician in the region, while 70% said this two years earlier. In January 2021 Avksentyeva announced her early resignation for health reasons

=== Opinions ===
- The Economist noted in an article entitled “The sudden popularity of a Russian mayor who lives modestly” her leadership style, which is atypical for Russia, and her popularity both in Yakutia and Russiawide.
- Avksentyeva's predecessor as mayor and incumbent Head of Yakutia Aysen Nikolayev noted that she has led the election headquarters of United Russia in Yakutsk for a long time, and therefore he believes that she is not an oppositionist. Nikolayev also described Avksentyeva as "an adequate person with whom it is comfortable to work."
- In September 2020 the ex-employee of the mayor's office Svetlana Altabasova accused Avksentyeva of a fraud with the sale of premises as part of the housing distribution program for the state employees in 2011. Initially, charges of fraud were brought against Altabasova herself, but she said that she was “the victim of a cunning scheme” created by Avksentyeva. According to Altabasova, the mayor and employees of the administration received apartments when Avksentyeva and her husband both were deputy mayors of Yakutsk.

== Member of parliament ==
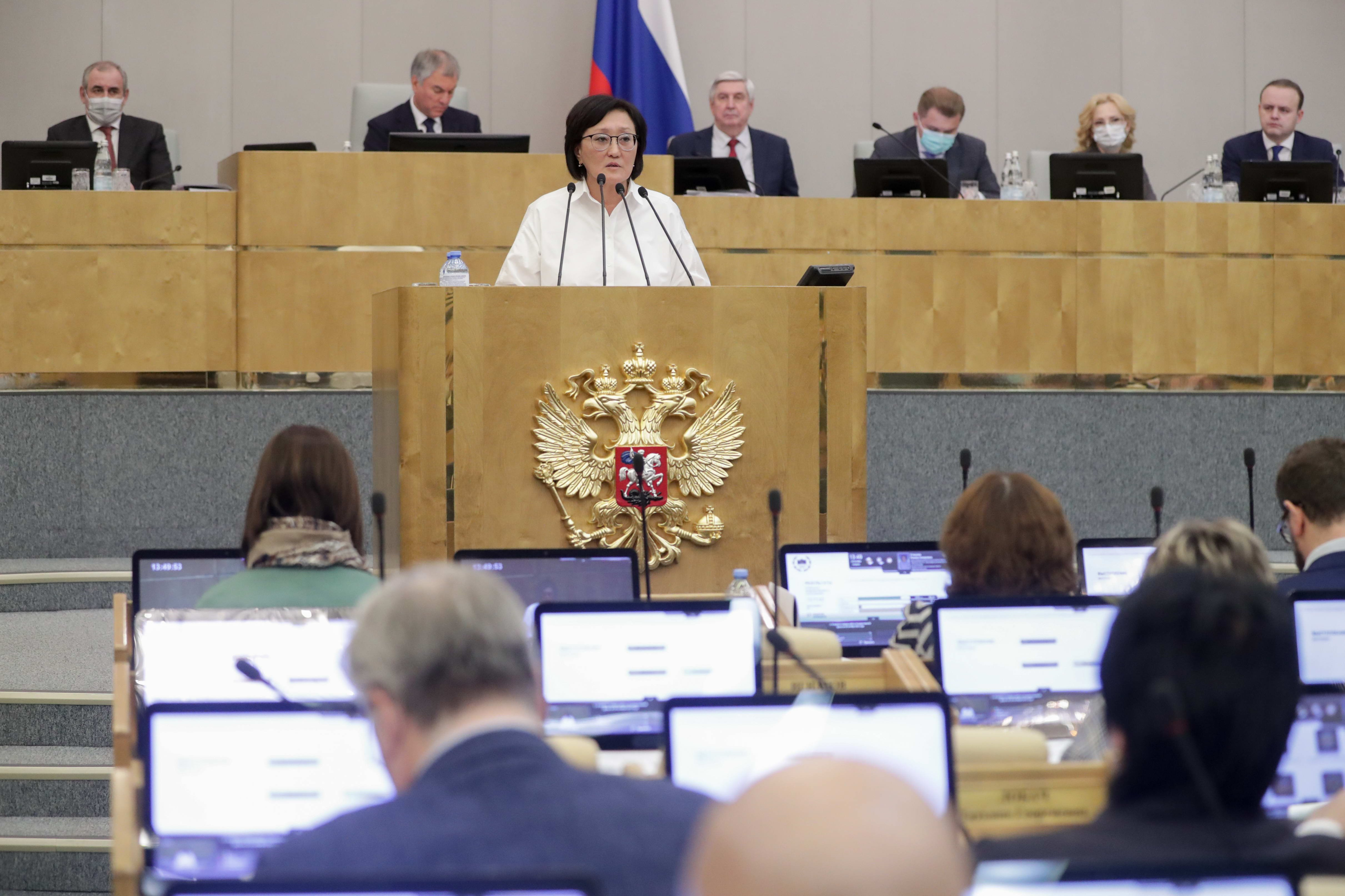
Sardana Avksentyeva speaking in front of the State Duma

After Avksentyeva's resignation the media have repeatedly expressed the point of view that administrative pressure was exerted on her to prevent her nomination for the upcoming elections to the 8th State Duma.

On 4 July 2021 at the 3rd congress of the New People, party leader Alexey Nechayev announced that Sardana Avksentyeva would be placed second after him in the federal party list for the lower house. In September, the New People received 5.33% of the vote and gained 13 from 450 seats.

=== Sanctions ===
Following the start of the 2022 Russian invasion of Ukraine on 24 February 2022, she was sanctioned by the European Union on 25 February and the United Kingdom on March 11. On 30 September 2022, the Office of Foreign Assets Control of the United States Department of the Treasury added Avksentyeva to the Specially Designated Nationals and Blocked Persons List due to her support for the Russian annexation of four Ukrainian regions and the Russian 2022 war censorship laws.

For similar reasons, she has been sanctioned by Canada, Australia, New Zealand, Switzerland and Ukraine.

== Personal life ==
Sardana Avksentyeva in her second marriage with Viktor Avksentyev. The couple raised four children. From the first marriage with Alexander there is an eldest daughter Natalia. Sardana's second husband Viktor is a candidate of economic sciences. He worked as first deputy mayor of Yakutsk during Yury Zabolev's tenure and in 2018 election he headed his wife's election headquarters.
