= NVK Sakha =

National Broadcaster Company Sakha (Russian: Национальная вещательная компания «Саха», Yakut: «Саха» көрдөрөр-иһитиннэрэр хампаанньа, romanized: «Saxa» kördörör-ihitinnerer xampaanńa) or NVK Sakha is the largest media company in The Republic of Sakha (Yakutia). It was founded in 1992 after the collapse of the USSR.

The company owns TV channels in Yakutia, Russia, and other countries. The main broadcasting languages are Yakut, English, Russian and Evenk. NVK Sakha owns its own animation and film production studios, and music studios. Since 2018, it has also been streaming 24/7 on YouTube.

70% of the shares are owned by the Russian VGTRK, 25% are owned by Yakutia, and 5% are in free float.
