= Aleksandr Akimov (politician) =

Russian political and economist

- Александр Акимов
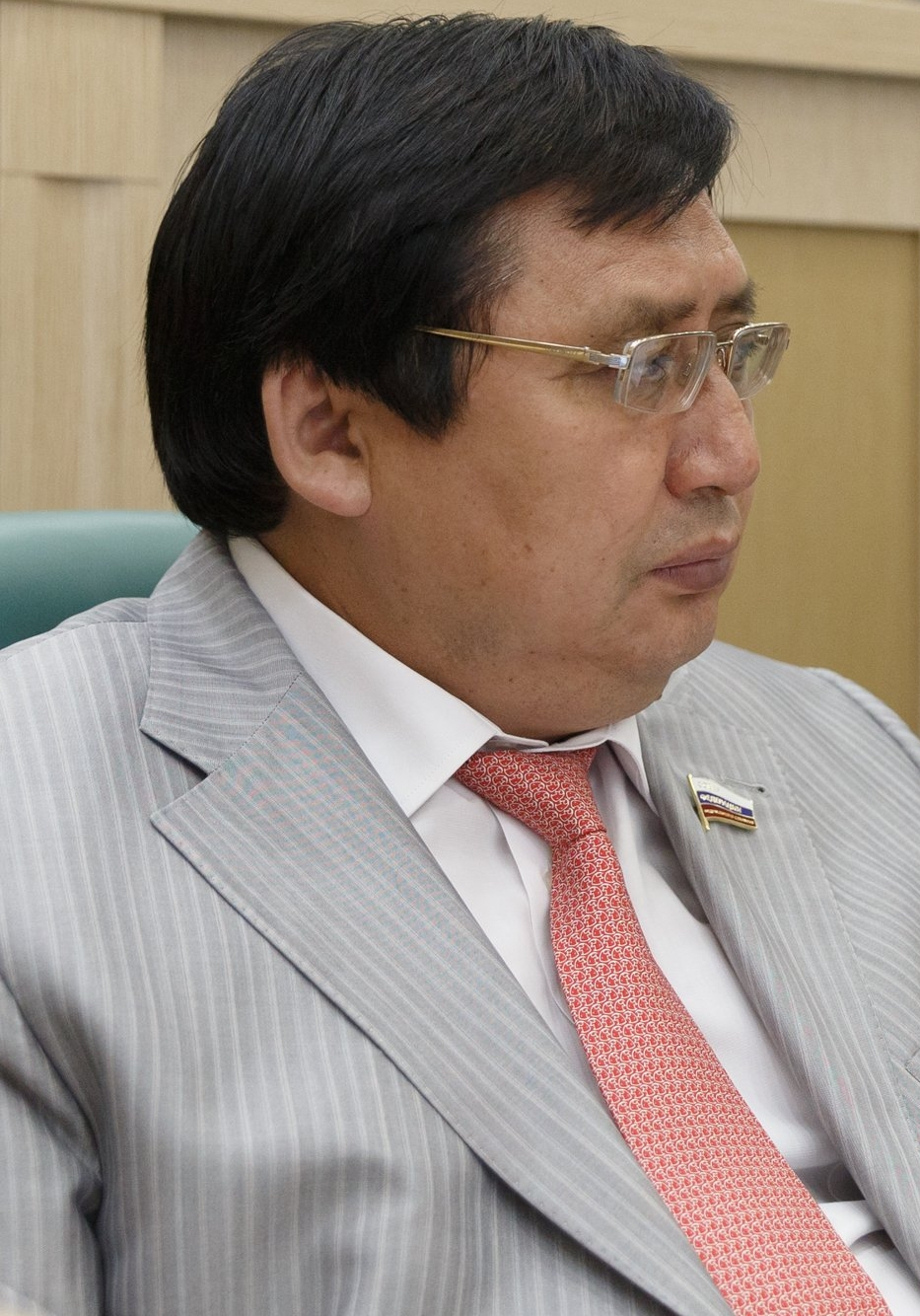
- Akimov in 2016

Senator from Sakha
- In office 16 November 2018 – October 2023
- Preceded by: Aleksandr Matveyev
- Succeeded by: Sakhamin Afanasyev

Vice President of the Sakha Republic (Yakutia)
- In office 2002 – 17 February 2007
- Preceded by: Spartak Borisov
- Succeeded by: Yevgeniya Mikhaylova

Personal details
- Born: Aleksandr Konstantinovich Akimov; 10 November 1954 (age 72) Kyukyai, Suntarsky District, Yakut ASSR, Russian SFSR, USSR
- Party: United Russia
- Spouse: Rozaliya Iyudovna
- Children: 2

Aleksandr Konstantinovich Akimov (Russian: Александр Константинович Акимов; born 10 November 1954) is a Russian politician of Yakut ethnicity who is currently a member of the Federation Council, a representative from the legislative body of state power of the Republic of Sakha (Yakutia) since 2 October 2013.

He also had been the Permanent Representative of the Sakha Republic (Yakutia) to the President of Russia from 2007 to 2013.

Akimov also served as vice-president of the republic from 2002 to 2007.

== Biography ==
Aleksandr Akimov was born on 10 November 1954 in Kyukiai, Suntar district, Yakut Autonomous Soviet Socialist Republic.

In 1976, he graduated from the Faculty of Economics of the Irkutsk Institute of National Economy.

From 1976 to 1983, he was the Manager of the department, chief economist of the state farm "Suntarsky", the First Secretary of the Suntar RK of the Komsomol, and then the director of the state farm "Toybokhoisky".

From 1983 to 1986, he was the First Secretary of the Yakut OK Komsomol.

From 1986 to 1989, he was a Postgraduate student of the Academy of Social Sciences under the Central Committee of the CPSU in Moscow, where he defended his thesis "New in the regional policy of development of the North (on the example of Yakutia)."

In 1989, he became the Head of the Agrarian Department of the Yakut Regional Committee of the CPSU.

From 1990 to 1991, he was the Head of the Department for Economic and Social Development of the Secretariat of the Supreme Soviet of the YaASSR.

In 1991, he was appointed Deputy Chairman of the State Committee for Economics of the Yakut-Sakha SSR.

Between 1992 and 1997, Akimov was the Minister of Social Protection, Labor and Employment of the Sakha Republic (Yakutia). In 1995, at the Academic Council of the Academy of Public Administration under the President of Russia, he defended his doctoral thesis on "Regulation of social development of the region in the context of the formation of a market economy".

From 1997 to 1998, he was the Acting Deputy Chairman of the Government of the Sakha Republic (Yakutia) - Minister of Economy of the republic.

In 1998, he officially became the Deputy Chairman of the Government of the Sakha Republic (Yakutia).

From 1999 to 2001, he was promoted to the First Deputy Chairman of the Government of the republic.

From 2001 to 2002, he was the First Deputy Chairman of the Government of the Sakha Republic (Yakutia), as well as the Head of the Presidential Administration and the Administration of the Government of the Sakha Republic (Yakutia).

In 2002, Akimov became the vice-president of the Sakha Republic (Yakutia), as the Head of the Presidential Administration and the Government Administration of Sakha Republic (Yakutia).

On 17 February 2007, he had been appointed as the Permanent Representative of the President of Russia.

In 2010, Akimov was awarded the Order of Friendship.

Since 2 October 2013, Akimov is a member of the Federation Council, a representative from the legislative body of state power of the Sakha Republic (Yakutia).

== Personal life ==
He is married to his wife, Rozaliya Iyudovna, and has a son and a daughter.

== Sanctions ==
Alexander Akimov is under personal sanctions introduced by the European Union, the United Kingdom, the USA, Canada, Switzerland, Australia, Ukraine, New Zealand, for ratifying the decisions of the "Treaty of Friendship, Cooperation and Mutual Assistance between the Russian Federation and the Donetsk People's Republic and between the Russian Federation and the Luhansk People's Republic" and providing political and economic support for Russia's annexation of Ukrainian territories.
