= State Assembly of the Sakha Republic =

Regional parliament of Sakha, Russia

State Assembly of the Sakha Republic Государственное собрание Республики Саха Саха Өрөспүүбүлүкэтин Ил Түмэнэ
- 6th legislature

Type
- Type: Unicameral

Leadership
- Chairman: Alexey Yeremeyev, United Russia since 30 June 2021

Structure
- Seats: 70
- Political groups: United Russia (55) New People (6); CPRF (4); SR—ZP (3); LDPR (1) Independent (1)

Elections
- Voting system: Mixed
- Last election: 10 September 2023
- Next election: 2028

Meeting place
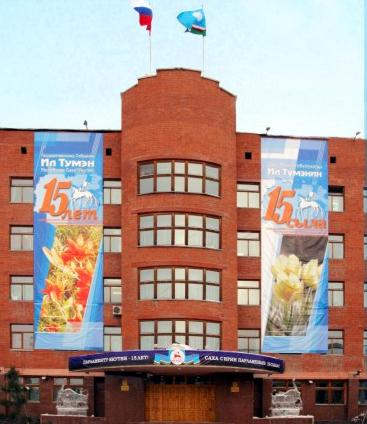

Website
- iltumen.ru

The State Assembly (Il Tumen) of the Republic of Sakha (Yakutia) (Note: Russian: Государственное собрание (Ил Тумэн) Республики Саха (Якутия); Yakut: Саха Өрөспүүбүлүкэтин Ил Түмэнэ, romanized: Saxa Öröspüübülüketin İl Tümene.) is the regional parliament of Sakha, a federal subject of Russia. A total of 70 deputies are elected for five-year terms.

== Elections ==
=== 2018 ===
Party	%	Seats
United Russia	50.84	43
Communist Party of the Russian Federation	19.44	10
A Just Russia	16.34	9
Liberal Democratic Party of Russia	9.57	4
Self-nominated	—	3
Civic Platform	—	1
Registered voters/turnout	50.71	

=== 2023 ===
Party	%	Seats
United Russia	54.36	55
New People	14.77	6
Communist Party of the Russian Federation	13.16	4
A Just Russia	9.39	3
Liberal Democratic Party of Russia	5.39	1
Self-nominated	—	1
Registered voters/turnout	48.30	

== See also ==
- List of Chairmen of the State Assembly of the Sakha Republic
