= Arsen Tomsky =

Kazakh businessman

- Арсен Томский
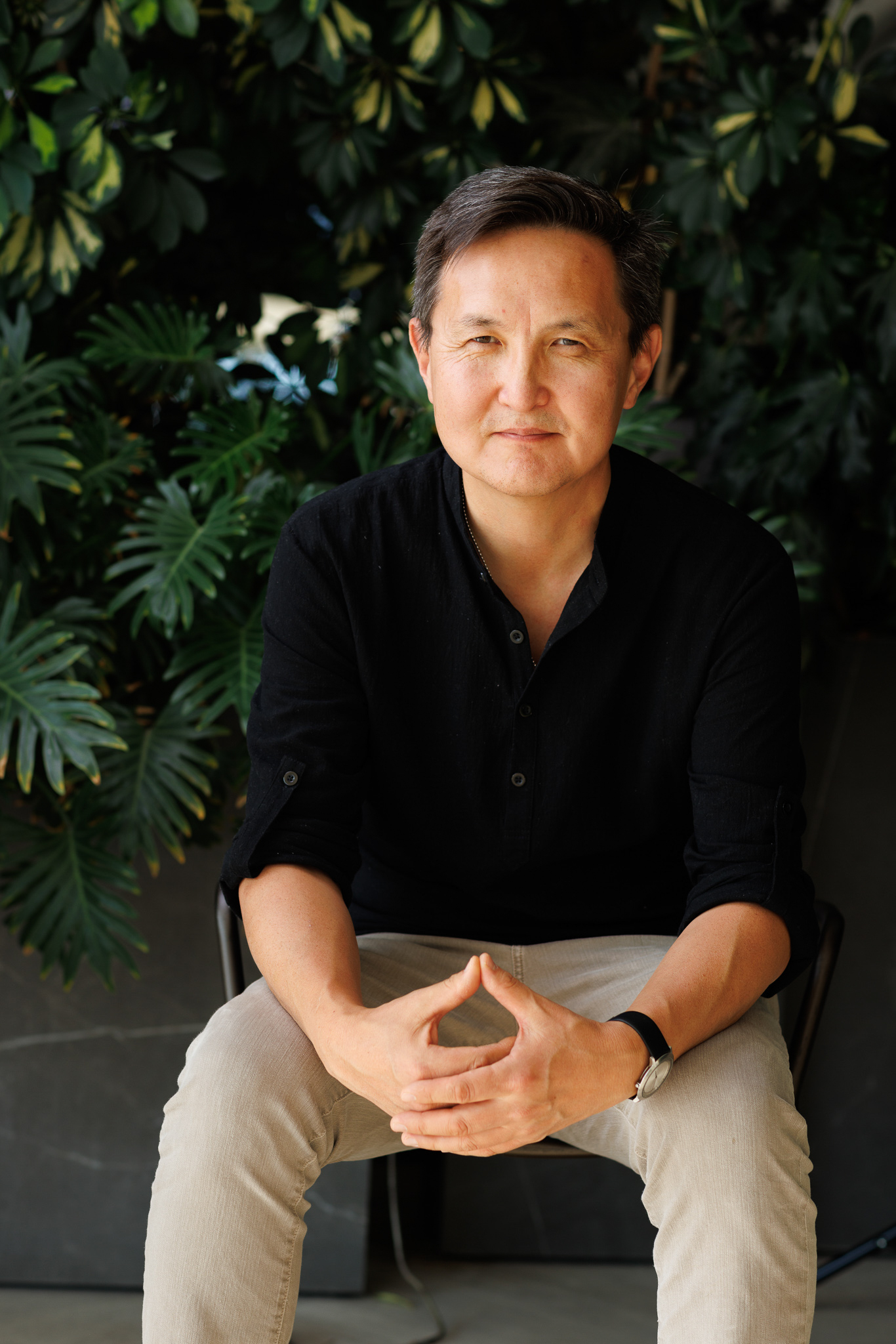
- Tomsky in 2023
- Born: November 20, 1973 (age 52); Yakutsk, Yakut ASSR, RSFSR, Soviet Union
- Citizenship: Kazakhstan
- Education: North-Eastern Federal University
- Title: Founder and CEO of InDrive

Arsen Grigoryevich Tomsky (Russian: Арсен Григорьевич Томский; born 20 November 1973) is a Russian-born Kazakh entrepreneur, public figure, and the founder and CEO of the international ride-hailing service inDrive.

== Early life ==
Arsen Tomsky was born on 20 November 1973 in Yakutsk, Republic of Sakha.

In 1994, Tomsky began his entrepreneurial journey by developing software. He initially created a system for analyzing the financial condition of banks, followed by an automated accounting program commissioned by the local Ministry of Finance.

The following year, he graduated from the Faculty of Mathematics at North-Eastern Federal University.

In 1999, Tomsky founded the company SakhaInternet, which later became the Sinet Group, and launched the website Ykt.ru. After being CEO of the Sinet Group for 20 years, he stepped down, transferring the company's shares to the Ykt.ru team.

== Career ==
In 2013, Tomsky founded inDriver (Independent Drivers). Initially launched as a passenger transportation service, the company later expanded to include freight transportation, intercity travel, courier services, and city-based services.

Six years later, inDriver achieved unicorn status following a $150 million investment round. That same year, Tomsky attended the Stanford Executive Program at the Stanford Graduate School of Business.

In 2022, following Russia's military invasion of Ukraine, Tomsky made the decision to completely relocate inDrive's employees from the country. The company was also rebranded as inDrive (Inner Drive).

In 2023, inDrive became the second most downloaded ride-hailing app and the fourth most downloaded travel app globally. Tomsky invested approximately $5 million of his own funds, accumulated during his time building the largest internet company in Yakutia, into the app's development.

At the end of the same year, Arsen Tomsky announced that he would receive Kazakh citizenship at the invitation of the government of Kazakhstan. In May 2024, Tomsky ranked 10th on Forbes magazine's list of "The 75 Richest Businessmen in Kazakhstan".

== Non-profit activities ==
Since 2012, the non-profit educational project Beginit has been operating under Tomsky's patronage, initially known as BeginIT, which taught the basics of programming to children from remote rural schools and orphanages. As of 2022, the project reached over 120 schools and orphanages in 13 countries. In 2023, the program evolved into Beginit, focusing on developing social leadership in youth from remote communities.

The Sinet Spark project fund began operating in 2020, with its budget supported by several sources, including Tomsky's personal contributions. In 2021, Sinet Spark provided financial assistance to combat forest fires in Yakutia. Subsequently, the organization launched a project to study the causes of these fires and reduce their occurrence, not only in Yakutia but around the world.

Also in 2020, Tomsky launched the non-profit Star Team program, aimed at helping schoolchildren and students gain admission to the best universities in the world.

In November 2021, the entrepreneur announced the launch of the Supernovas non-profit football project. The project identifies individuals who wish to become coaches and helps them establish football schools for children in small towns within their local areas. All football lessons are free of charge, with the coaches' work funded by Supernovas. As of 2024, Supernovas operates in Egypt, Ghana, Kenya, Colombia, Chile, and Kazakhstan.

On Tomsky's initiative, the Alternativa Film Awards were launched in 2023 as a global non-profit initiative aimed at supporting emerging filmmakers from Asia. The award focuses on socially significant films, with the jury evaluating works not only for their artistic qualities but also for their relevance to society.

Another of Tomsky's initiatives is the creation of an innovative startup called FluentaAI, designed to help people with a stutter. This software converts their whispers into natural speech without stuttering during online calls. As a result, FluentaAI has been integrated with video conferencing apps such as Zoom, Google Meet, Microsoft Teams.
