= Khatassy =

Khatassy Хатассы Хатас (Yakut)
- Selo
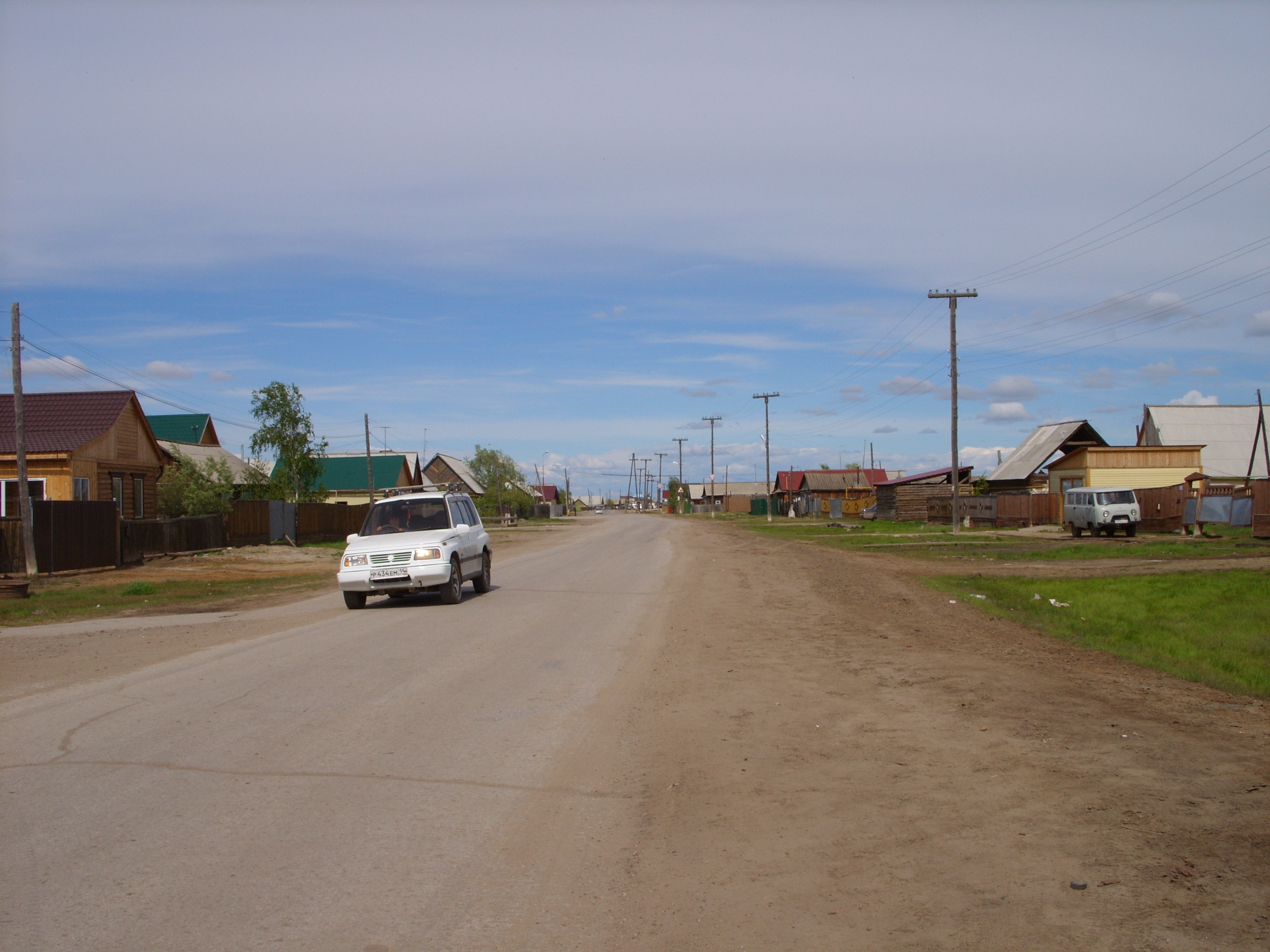
- Street view, Khatassy
- Interactive map of Khatassy
- Location of Khatassy Khatassy (Sakha Republic)
- Coordinates: 61°54′N 129°38′E
- Country: Russia
- Federal subject: Sakha Republic
- Elevation: 96 m (315 ft)

Population (2010 Census)
  - Total: 4,979
  - Estimate (2021): 5,470 (+9.9%)

Administrative status
  - Subordinated to: city of republic significance of Yakutsk

Municipal status
  - Municipal district: Yakutsk Urban Okrug
- Time zone: UTC+9 (MSK+6)
- Postal code: 677904
- OKTMO ID: 98701000141

Khatassy (Russian: Хата́ссы; Yakut: Хатас, Xatas) is a rural locality (a selo) under the administrative jurisdiction of the city of republic significance of Yakutsk in the Sakha Republic, Russia. Its population as of the 2010 Census was 4979; up from 3800 recorded in the 2002 Census.

== Administrative and municipal status ==
Within the framework of administrative divisions, the selo of Khatassy, the Urban type settlement of Zhatay and ten other rural localities are subordinated to the city of republic significance of Yakutsk, which is an administrative unit with the status equal to that of the districts. As a municipal division, Khatassy is incorporated as, and is the administrative centre of, Khatassky Rural Settlement.
