= InDrive =

Online ride-hailing service

Suol Innovations Ltd.
- Trade name: inDrive (since 2022); inDriver (2013–22)
- Type: Private
- Industry: Ride-hailing, Delivery, Intercity rides, Fintech, Grocery, Advertising
- Founded: June 24, 2013; 13 years ago in Yakutsk, Russia
- Founder: Arsen Tomsky
- Headquarters: Mountain View, California, United States
- Area served: 47 countries and 1,200 cities worldwide
- Number of employees: 3,700
- Website: indrive.com

inDrive (previously known as inDriver) is a US-headquartered mobility and delivery platform operating in over 1,200 cities across 47 countries. In addition to ride-hailing, inDrive offers intercity transportation, delivery, courier, financial and advertising services.

The inDrive app had been downloaded more than 400 million times since its 2013 launch by March 2026.

Headquartered in Mountain View, California, the company was officially launched in 2013.

inDrive operates using a peer-to-peer pricing model. In its app, all conditions of the trip are determined as a result of an agreement between passengers and drivers. Passengers make all payments for rides directly to drivers, in cash or non-cash settlements. inDrive allows riders to propose a fare and drivers to accept or counteroffer. In 2026 company said it charged about 10% commission per ride at that time.

== History ==
inDriver was founded in 2012 by entrepreneur Arsen Tomsky in Yakutsk, one of the coldest cities in the world. The service originated when a group of local students established a collective group of "independent drivers" (i.e. inDrivers) on social media in response to a sharp increase in taxi prices when outside temperatures dropped precipitously. Members of the group shared where they wanted to go and the prices they were willing to pay, allowing drivers to in turn contact these customers and negotiate prices. One year later, the group moved to the Sinet Company which created a peer-to-peer transportation-based system based on this concept.

In 2013, inDriver was officially launched.

Following Russia's invasion of Ukraine, inDrive exited the Russian market and relocated part of its workforce to Kazakhstan and Cyprus.

inDrive subsequently launched other services, including intercity trips, delivery, and fintech services.

=== International expansion ===
In December 2014, inDriver expanded internationally by launching in Astana, Kazakhstan.

The company entered Latin America in April 2018, when the service became available in Mexico and then later in Guatemala, Colombia, Peru, El Salvador, Chile, Brazil, Ecuador and Bolivia. In Brazil, inDrive partnered with the finance platform Belvo to simplify the payment process.

In November 2018, the service became available in Africa with the launch in Arusha, Tanzania.

In 2018, the company opened a temporary office in New York City, and later, established its headquarters in Mountain View, California.

The company started its operations in Pakistan in 2021 and became the most downloaded ride-hailing app in the country within a year.

In June 2022, inDrive announced that it was entering the Australian market, with an initial launch in Melbourne.

In July 2023, inDrive launched in the United States in Miami, South Florida.

In November 2023, inDrive launched in the Philippine cities of Bacolod, Baguio, Butuan, Cagayan de Oro, and Iloilo. In January 2024, the Land Transportation Franchising and Regulatory Board (LTFRB) suspended inDrive’s operations in the Philippines over fare-bargaining rules. Operations resumed in June 2024 after the company adopted the regulator’s prescribed fare structure. The app also launched in Metro Manila.

=== Corporate development ===
In February 2017, the service passed 100 million rides booked through the InDriver mobile app. There were more than 5 million registered users at the time.

In April 2020, due to COVID-19 pandemic-related lockdowns, the company suspended launches in new countries to focus on servicing its existing markets. Among other initiatives, inDriver launched its "Medical Worker On The Way" program to help healthcare workers around the world get to and from work. Despite the lockdowns, inDriver managed to reach 50 million app-downloads in July 2020.

In 2021, a $150 million investment round valued inDriver at $1.23 billion. inDriver reached 1 billion trips in May 2021.

By March 2022, inDriver had established regional operational hubs in the Americas, Asia, the Middle East, Africa and the CIS to support its expanding business.

In October 2022, inDriver rebranded and became inDrive, transforming into a group of companies.

In 2023 and 2024, inDrive secured two financing facilities of $150 million each from General Catalyst. Reuters reported that the 2024 facility was intended to support service expansion and entry into new markets. The financing used a hybrid debt instrument tied to the company’s performance.

In 2023, inDrive launched New Ventures, which was intended to invest up to $100 million in startups in emerging markets. As reported in 2026, the company was expanding delivery services after acquiring online grocery businesses in Pakistan and Kazakhstan.

In February 2024, inDrive launched inDrive Money, offering cash loans to drivers operating on its platform in Mexico, aiming to address the financial needs of drivers who are often excluded by traditional financial institutions. Later that year, InDrive Money was launched in Colombia, and in March 2025 — in Indonesia and Peru.

By 2025, inDrive's courier delivery service for small businesses and general users was launched in Brazil, Ecuador, Egypt, India, Mexico, Peru, Pakistan, South Africa, Colombia, Kazakhstan, Nigeria and more.

Similarly, in 2025 inDrive's ride service between cities City to City operates in India, Pakistan, Brazil, Colombia, Egypt, Morocco, Kazakhstan and other countries.

== App description ==
To request a ride, the user specifies the starting point and destination address, the price they are willing to pay, and any comments for the driver. Drivers can make a counter-offer to the price proposed by the passenger. Other options include adding additional destinations and indicating the need for a child seat, among others. The information about the car and driver confirmed for the service will appear on the passenger's phone screen. This includes the driver's rating and contact information, the car's approximate arrival time, and its real-time geolocation on the map.

According to Sensor Tower analytics, in 2025 inDrive remained the second most downloaded app in the ride-hailing category globally for the fourth consecutive year. inDrive also ranked 4th most downloaded app in the Travel category worldwide in 2025.

== Awards ==
inDrive was nominated for the GSMA Global Mobile Awards (GLOMO) 2019 in the 'Most Innovative Mobile App' category.

The service was named Google Play's 2019 Best Everyday Essential app in Brazil.

inDrive won the SHIELD Trust Awards 2022 and 2024.

In May 2024, inDrive released a documentary about the company's history titled "Inner Drive". In the same year, the film won several nominations at the Cannes Corporate Media & TV Awards. In 2025 it also won three awards at the 2025 US International Awards and two awards at New York Festivals TV & Film Awards.
