= Sakha-Korean School =

International school in Yakutsk, Russia

Coordinates: 62°2′7″N 129°43′33″E

- 42 Korolenko St. Yakutsk, 677005; Sakha Republic, Russia

Information
- Established: 1994
- Principal: Vadim Borisov Georgievich
- Faculty: 30
- Enrollment: 280
- Website: sakhakorea.yaguo.ru

Sakha-Korean School

Korean name
- Hangul: 사하·한국학교
- Hanja: 사하·韓國學校
Transcriptions
- Revised Romanization: Saha-Hanguk Hakgyo
- McCune–Reischauer: Saha-Han'guk Hakkyo

Russian name
- Russian: Саха-корейская школа
- Romanization: Sakha-koreyskaya shkola

The Sakha-Korean School is a school in Yakutsk, Sakha Republic, Russia. It was founded in 1994 and in 2008 it enrolled roughly 280 students at the primary and middle-school levels (up from roughly 200 in 2002).

== History ==
The origins of the school go back to May 1994; a South Korean ethnographer doing research on the indigenous peoples of Siberia had been in discussions with the government of the Sakha Republic to set up a Korean-language school, and began to look for teachers in South Korea. Gang Deok-su, a professor of Russian at the Hankuk University of Foreign Studies and head of the Sakha-Korea Friendship association, agreed to assist. The Yakutsk Korean Association, founded in 1989, had previously set up Sunday schools for the teaching of the Korean language, but due to the increasing demand for specialists of the language, powerful supporters threw their weight behind the move to set up a full-time school, including president of the Sakha Republic Mikhail Nikolayev. Then-head of the Yakutsk Department of Education Evgeniya Mikhailova provided early local leadership for the project; the Sakha Republic government has continued to provide financial support to the school as part of its wider plan to improve foreign-language education in the republic. Other early local supporters of the school included head of the Institute for Advanced Education Studies Olga Chorosova and chairwoman of the Yakutsk Korean Association Vera Shamayeva.

In 2006, the school established a branch in Aldansky Ulus.

Roughly 250 students have graduated from the school since its founding. Its fifteenth anniversary, in December 2009, was celebrated in a ceremony attended by Mikhailova (who by then had risen to the position of vice-president of the Sakha Republic), minister of internal affairs Georgy Nikonov, and the South Korean consul-general of Irkutsk, Choi Seok-in.

== Staff ==
Evgeniy Cherepanov Jeka was promoted from vice-principal to principal in 2002, when her predecessor Gennady Kim decided to take another job. The school has a teaching staff of 25 full-time teachers and 5 part-time teachers. Their staff includes four South Korean teachers.

== Programme ==
Among other subjects, the school offers Korean as a second language, taught by the native Korean teachers; teaching begins in the 5th grade, with three contact hours per week. It is one of two schools in Yakutsk which offers Korean to young students, the other being School #16. The teachers experience some culture shock at the different style of education, including the relative lack of age-based hierarchy at the school. The school also introduces other aspects of Korean culture to students, such as taekwondo, Korean music and Korean cuisine. Japanese and Chinese languages are also taught. Each summer, the school sends about 10 to 20 of its students to Seoul, South Korea, on study-abroad and homestay programmes. Graduates have gone on to work in a variety of Korean-related fields including translation and as language instructors at Yakutsk State University; others have earned places at South Korean universities for further studies.
