= Tulagino =

Tulagino Тулагино
- Selo
- Location within Sakha Republic Location within Russia
- Coordinates: 62°15′13″N 129°52′30″E
- Country: Russia
- Region: Sakha Republic
- Municipality: Yakutsk

Population (2010)
  - Total: 1,596
- Time zone: UTC+10:00

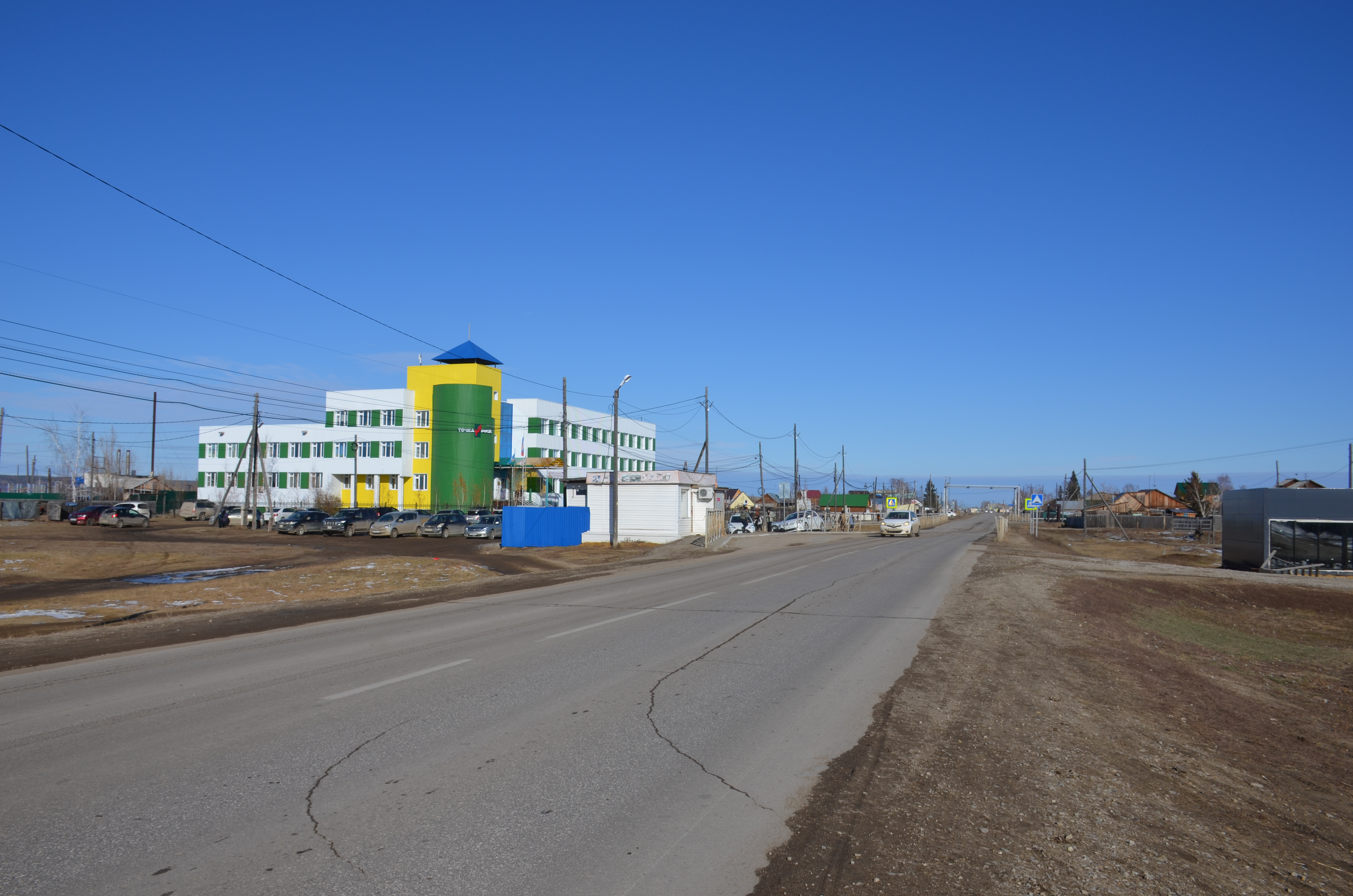
Tulaginskaya Secondary School. P. I. Kochneva, Tulagino village

Tulagino (Russian: Тулагино; Yakut: Тулагы, Tulagı) is a rural locality (a selo) under the administrative jurisdiction of the city of republic significance of Yakutsk in the Sakha Republic, Russia. Its population as of the 2010 Census was 1596; up from 1231 recorded in the 2002 Census.

== Administrative and municipal status ==
Within the framework of administrative divisions, the selo of Tulagino, the Urban type settlement of Zhatay and ten other rural localities are subordinated to the city of republic significance of Yakutsk, which is an administrative unit with the status equal to that of the districts. As a municipal division, Khatassy is incorporated as, and is the administrative centre of, Tulagino-Kildemsky Rural Settlement.
