= Yevgeniya Mikhaylova =

Russian politician (born 1949)

- Евгения Михайлова

Rector of the North-Eastern Federal University
- In office 9 April 2010 – 26 June 2019

4th Vice President of Sakha (Yakutia)
- In office 15 March 2007 – 9 April 2010
- President: Vyacheslav Shtyrov
- Preceded by: Aleksandr Akimov
- Succeeded by: Dmitry Glushko

Personal details
- Born: Yevgeniya Isayevna Mikhaylova; October 9, 1949 (age 76) Suntar, Yakut ASSR, Russian SFSR, Soviet Union
- Education: Yakutsk State University
- Awards: Alt text

Yevgeniya Isayevna Mikhaylova (Russian: Евгения Исаевна Михайлова; born on October 9, 1949) is an educator, a researcher, an academician, a philanthropist, a public figure and an eminent politician of the Russian Federation. She holds an honorary title - the Honorable Citizen of the Sakha Republic (Yakutia). She is an acting member of the Russian Academy of Education. Currently, Yevgeniya Mikhaylova is the President of the Ammosov North-Eastern Federal University. Previously, she served as the Vice President of the Russian Federation's Sakha Republic.

== Early life and career ==
Yevgeniya Mikhaylova was born in the family of Anastasiya and Isay Mikhaylov in the Siberian village of Suntar (former Yakut ASSR). After graduating from school number 2 of Yakutsk and successful results of admission exams, she enters Yakutsk State University and majors in Mathematics. In 1972, Mikhaylova receives her Specialist degree in Mathematics. Few years later, she continues her education and conducts research at Moscow Psychological Institute graduate school. She worked as a teacher, an organizer of educational work in Yakutsk high school № 20, an inspector, a manager the Yaroslavskiy regional department of national education of Yakutsk, an assistant manager, a manager of the Yakut city department of national education, a chief of a municipal government of education, a deputy minister of education.

She served as deputy director and then director of the Yakutsk Department of Education (1988-1996), and then went on to become the Sakha Republic's Deputy Minister and then Minister of Education (1996-1997; 1997-2002). She was appointed the Vice President of the Sakha Republic by decree of President Vyacheslav Shtyrov in 2002. Outside politics, she is one of the sponsors of the Sakha-Korean School.
