= Staraya Tabaga =

Staraya Tabaga Старая Табага Эргэ Табаҕа (Yakut)
- Selo
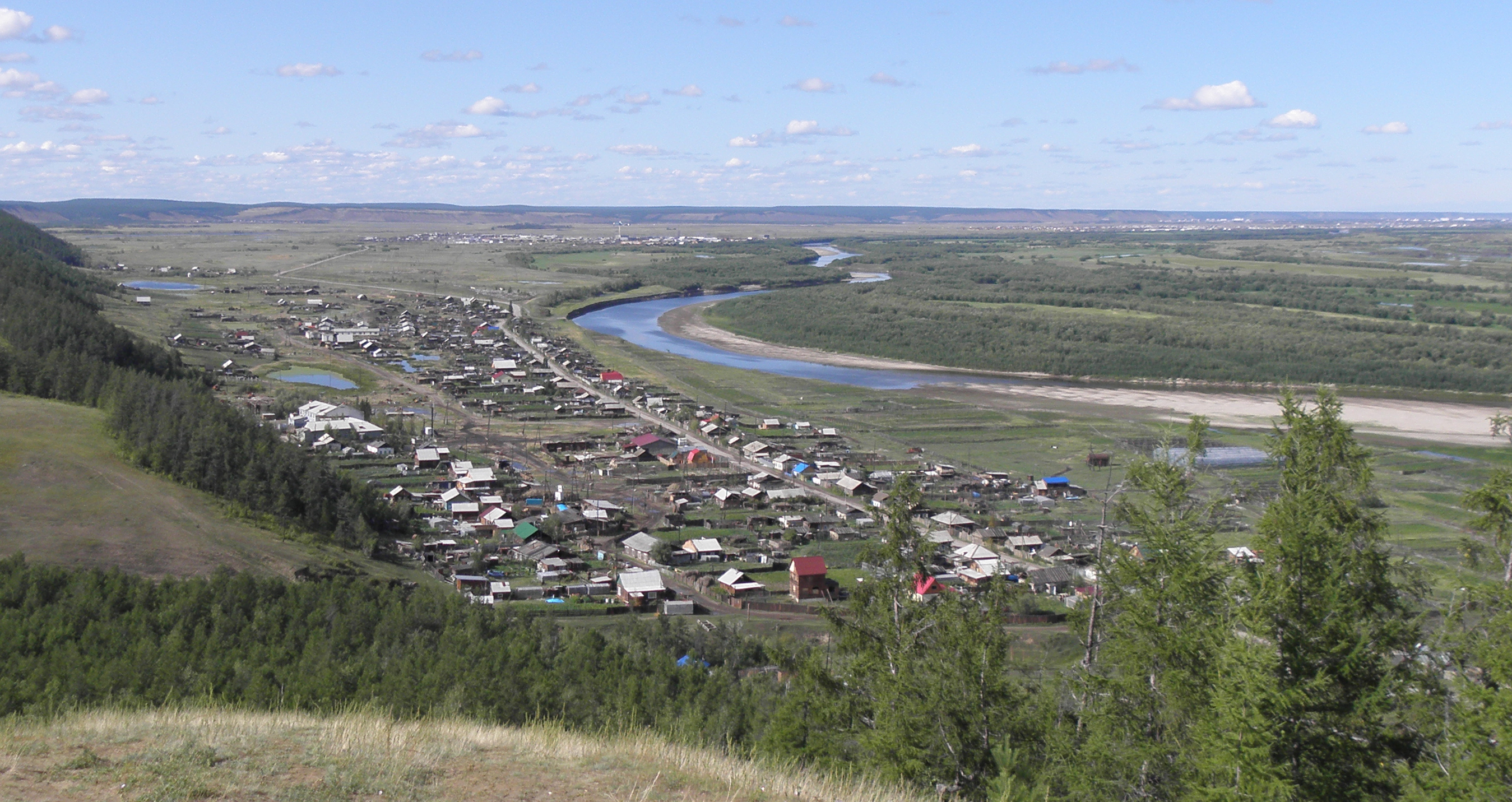
- View of Staraya Tabaga
- Interactive map of Staraya Tabaga
- Location of Staraya Tabaga Staraya Tabaga (Sakha Republic)
- Coordinates: 61°49′N 129°39′E
- Country: Russia
- Federal subject: Sakha Republic
- Elevation: 97 m (318 ft)

Population (2010 Census)
  - Total: 692
  - Estimate (2021): 616 (−11%)

Administrative status
  - Subordinated to: city of republic significance of Yakutsk

Municipal status
  - Urban okrug: Yakutsk Urban Okrug
- Time zone: UTC+9 (MSK+6)
- Postal code: 677911
- OKTMO ID: 98701000111

Staraya Tabaga (Russian: Ста́рая Табага́; Yakut: Эргэ Табаҕа, Erge Tabağa) is a rural locality (a selo) under the administrative jurisdiction of the city of republic significance of Yakutsk in the Sakha Republic, Russia. Its population as of the 2010 Census was 692.
