= Permafrost Kingdom =

Tourist complex in Yakutsk, Sakha Republic, Russia

Coordinates: 62°02′39″N 129°37′27″E

Permafrost Kingdom (Russian: Ца́рство ве́чной мерзлоты́) is a tourist complex in Yakutsk, Sakha Republic, Russia. Established in 2005, the complex is located within a permafrost glacier near Chochur-Muran Mountain and contains displays of ice sculptures of local pagan gods and other characters. Temperatures within the complex range from −7 °C (19 °F) in summer to −20 °C (−4 °F) in winter.

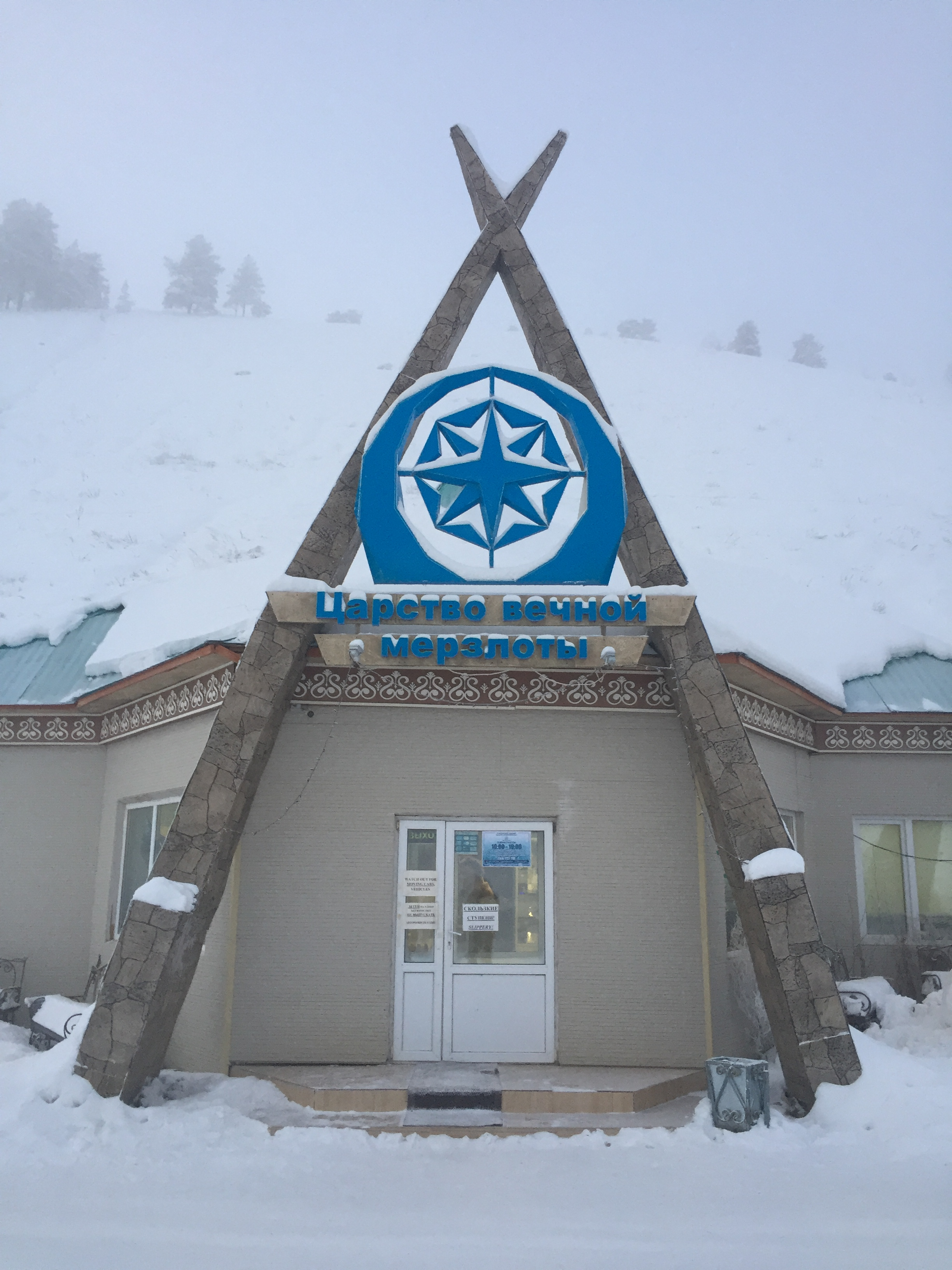
Main entrance

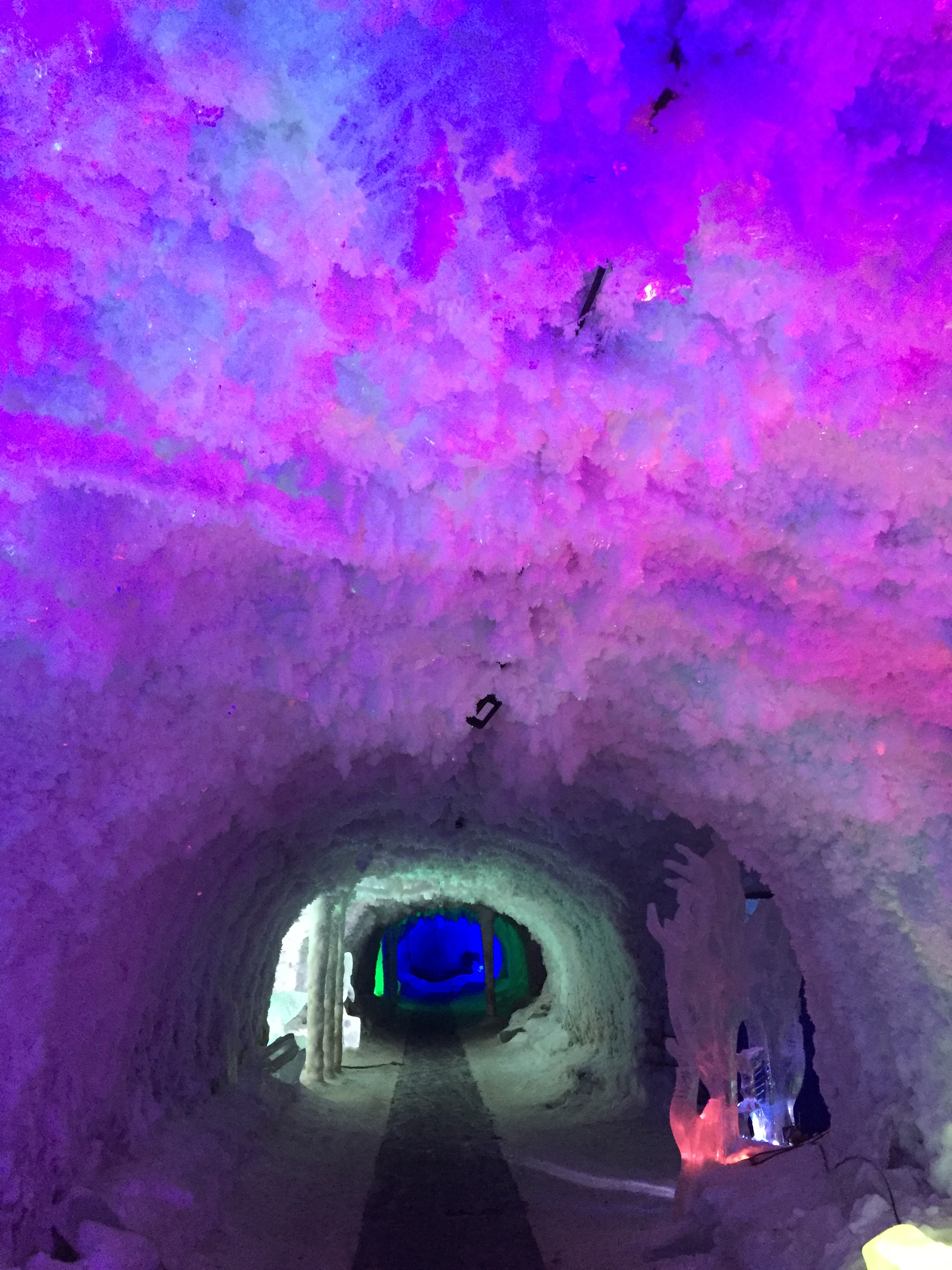
A passage inside the complex
