= Yakutsk School Number 16 =

- Yakutsk, Sakha Republic; Russia

Information
- Established: 1940s
- Principal: Aleksandr Dubinin
- Enrollment: 700

Yakutsk School Number 16 (Russian: Якутская городская школа №16) is a state-run school in Yakutsk, Sakha Republic. It was set up in the 1940s. As of 2005, it had roughly 700 students. It is a UNESCO Associated School. The principal is Aleksandr Dubinin; his wife, Roza Hanbeevna Dubinina, is also a teacher there. The school attracted negative attention in 2008 due to a video which a student uploaded to a video-sharing site during the summer holiday, which insulted several teachers there.

School 16 is one of two schools in the city which teach Korean as a foreign language, the other being the Sakha-Korean School. They began teaching the language, along with taekwondo, in the 1990s. As of 2005, they had 127 students studying the language. The program has expanded due to the enthusiasm of Dubinina, herself a descendant of Korean immigrants to Russia and a former teacher at the Sakha-Korean School. In 2005, a delegation from South Korea visited the school and gave them Korean clothing and school bags as a gift, and promised to provide further funding for textbooks and for study trips to Seoul for the best students. There are plans to employ a further teacher from South Korea to assist in the programme as well.
