= North-Eastern Federal University =

University in Russia

Ammosov North-Eastern Federal University (NEFU)
- Russian: Северо-Восточный Федеральный Университет им.М.К.Аммосова (СВФУ); Sakha: М. К. Аммуоhап аатынан Хотугулуу-Илиҥҥи федеральнай университет
- Established: August 23, 1956 (Yakutsk State University was established); April 2, 2010 (North-Eastern Federal University)
- Rector: Anatoliy Nikolayev
- Academic staff: Building details
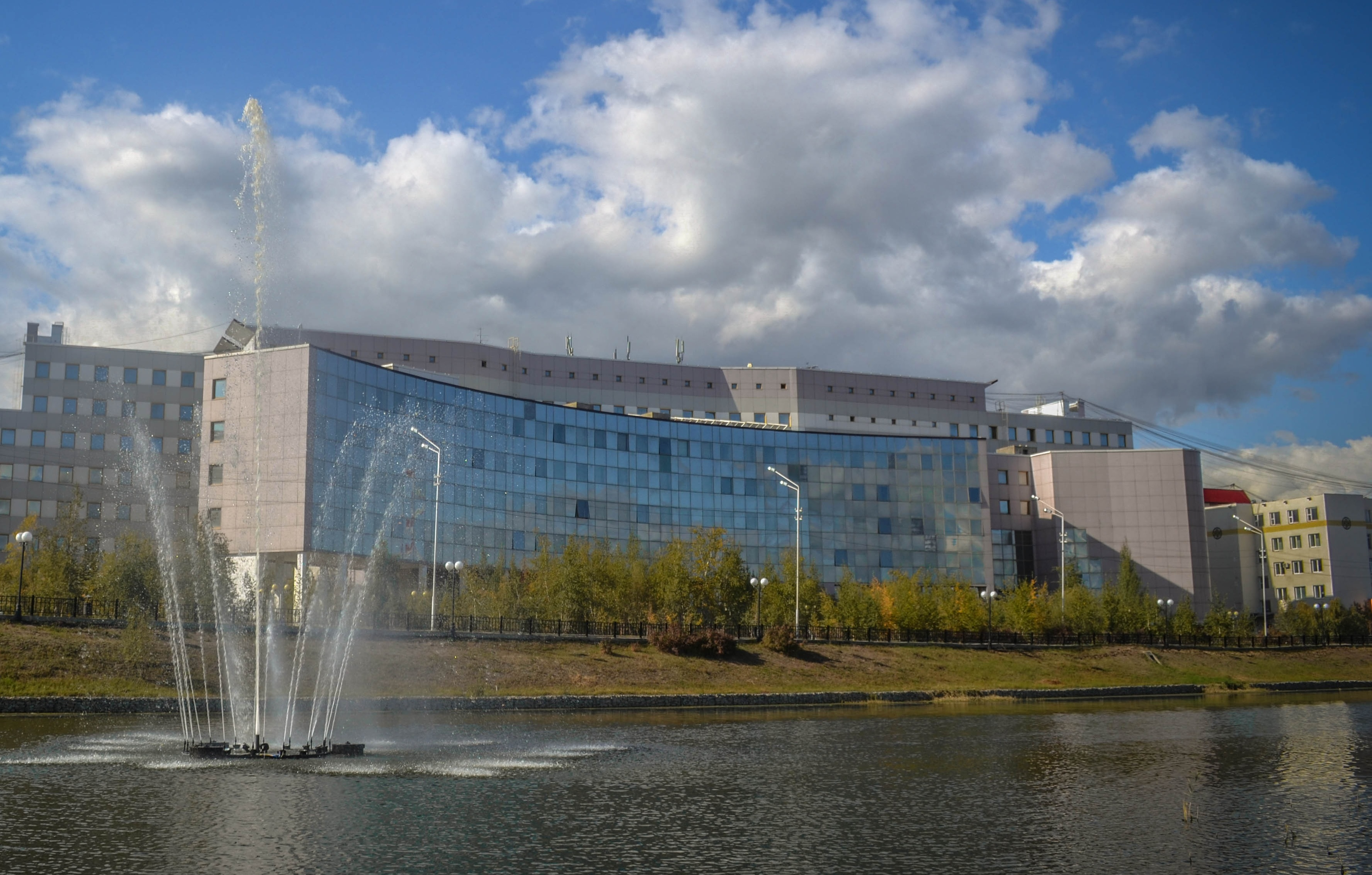
- Campus building in August 2013

General information
- Coordinates: 62°01′17″N 129°42′38″E
- Students: 16,000
- Location: Yakutsk, Russia
- Website: http://www.s-vfu.ru/en

University rankings

Regional – Overall
- QS Emerging Europe and Central Asia: 251-300 (2022)

The Ammosov North-Eastern Federal University, NEFU, (in Russian: Северо-Восточный федеральный университет имени Максима Кировича Аммосова; in Sakha: М. К. Аммуоhап аатынан Хотугулуу-Илиҥҥи федеральнай университет) previously known as Yakutsk State University (in Russian: Якутский государственный университет имени Максима Кировича Аммосова), is one of Russia's ten federal universities. NEFU's main campus is in Yakutsk (Sakha Republic), and it has two other campuses in Sakha (one in Mirny and one in Neryungri) as well as one in Anadyr in the Chukotka Autonomous Okrug.

The official name is Ammosov North-Eastern Federal University Federal State Autonomous Educational Institution of Higher Education. The undergraduate student population numbers over 16,000, while more than 500 students are engaged in postgraduate work. 1,600 academic staff are employed at the university. Of these 200 hold doctor’s degree, 800 are candidate of science degree. There are 15 institutes, 9 faculties, and 3 university branches in Mirny, Neryungri and Chukotka, and 5 major research institutes. Students and staff have free access to the Ethernet and Wi-Fi.

== History ==
NEFU was officially established in April 2010 on the basis of Ammosov Yakutsk State University. The university holds the name of Maksim Kirovich Ammosov, a statesman of Soviet Yakutia. Recent reforms in the Russian Federation created a new network of federal universities.

== Academics ==
=== Institutes ===
- of Medicine
- of Finance and Economics
- of Mathematics and Computer Science
- of Physics and Technologies
- of Sports and Physical Education
- of Foreign Languages and Regional Studies
- of Psychology
- of Languages and Cultures of the Peoples of the Russian North-East
- Teacher Training
- Technological
- of Civil Engineering
- of Natural Sciences
- Mining

=== Faculties ===
- of History
- of Philology
- of Law
- of Road Construction
- of Geology and Survey
- Faculty of Pre-Undergraduate Education offers preparatory courses to schoolchildren

=== Branches ===
- Neryungri Technical Institute (branch) of North-Eastern Federal University
- Mirny Polytechnic Institute (branch) of North-Eastern Federal University
- Chukotka branch of North-Eastern Federal University

== Research ==
=== Institutes ===
There are five research institutions including:

- Institute of Mathematics,
- Health Institute,
- Institute of Applied Ecology of North with LAZAREV MAMMOTH museum and lab,
- Institute of Regional Economy of North,
- OLONKHO Institute,
- KULAKOVSKY Institute.

== Traditions ==
=== Awards ===
- A Kate Marsden scholarship is given to the best English language program student each year at the Institute of Foreign Languages and Regional Studies.

== Community engagement ==
- Institute of Lifelong Professional Education
- Faculty of Pre-Undergraduate Education

== Notable alumni ==
1. Evgeniya Mikhailova (Educator, researcher, philanthropist, and politician)
2. Georgy Balakshin (Olympic boxer)
3. Viktor Lebedev (Freestyle wrestler)

== Contacts ==
58, Belinsky Street, Yakutsk

Sakha Republic (Yakutia), RUSSIAN FEDERATION, 677891
