= Zhatay =

Zhatay Жатай
- Urban-type settlement

Other transcription(s)
  - Yakut: Жатай
- Flag Coat of arms
- Interactive map of Zhatay
- Location of Zhatay Zhatay (Sakha Republic)
- Coordinates: 62°09′N 129°49′E
- Country: Russia
- Federal subject: Sakha Republic
- SettlementSelsoviet: Zhatay
- Founded: 1920s
- Urban-type settlement status since: April 28, 1948
- Elevation: 95 m (312 ft)

Population (2010 Census)
  - Total: 9,504
  - Estimate (2025): 12,541 (+32%)

Administrative status
  - Subordinated to: city of republic significance of Yakutsk
  - Capital of: Settlement of Zhatay

Municipal status
  - Urban okrug: Zhatay Urban Okrug
  - Capital of: Zhatay Urban Okrug
- Time zone: UTC+
- Postal code: 677902
- OKTMO ID: 98702000051
- Website: www.jhatay.ru

Zhatay population
- 2010 Census: 9,504
- 2002 Census: 8,405
- 1989 Census: 8,152
- 1979 Census: 7,073

Zhatay (Russian: Жата́й, IPA: [ʐɐˈtaj]; Yakut: Сатай, Һатай, romanized: Satay, Hatay) is an urban locality (an urban-type settlement) under the administrative jurisdiction of the city of republic significance of Yakutsk in the Sakha Republic, Russia, located on the left bank of the Lena River, 15 kilometers (9.3 mi) downstream of Yakutsk. As of the 2010 Census, its population was 9,504.

== History ==
Previously called Zhataystroy (Жатайстрой), it was granted urban-type settlement status and renamed on April 28, 1948.

== Administrative and municipal status ==
Within the framework of administrative divisions, the urban-type settlement of Zhatay and eleven rural localities are subordinated to the city of republic significance of Yakutsk, which is an administrative unit with the status equal to that of the districts. As a municipal division, Zhatay is incorporated as Zhatay Urban Okrug. Yakutsk and the eleven rural localities are independently incorporated as Yakutsk Urban Okrug.

== Transportation ==
Zhatay is a river port with a shipyard.
