= Yakutsk =

City in Sakha Republic, Russia

Yakutsk Якутск
- City under republican jurisdiction

Other transcription(s)
  - Yakut: Дьокуускай
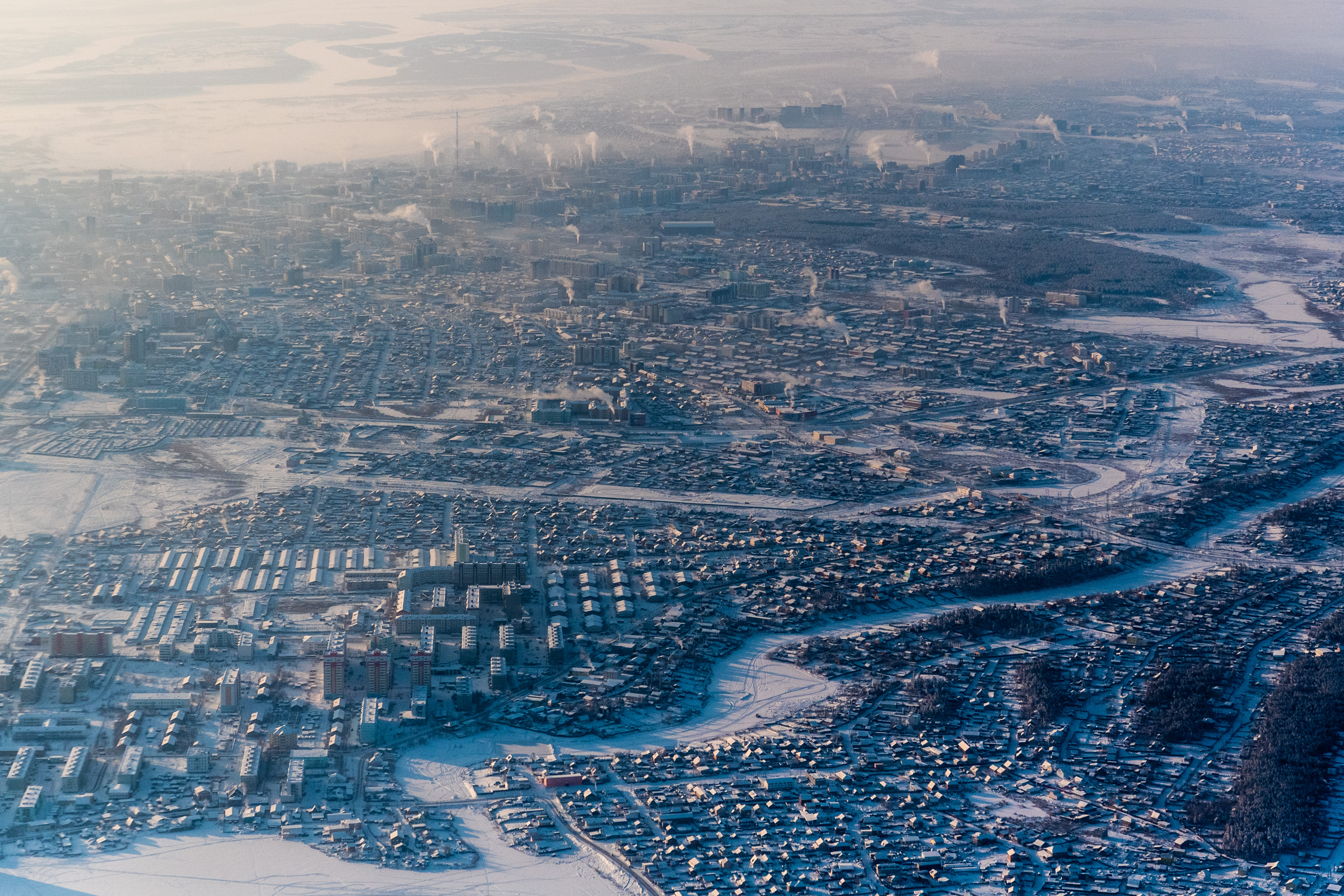
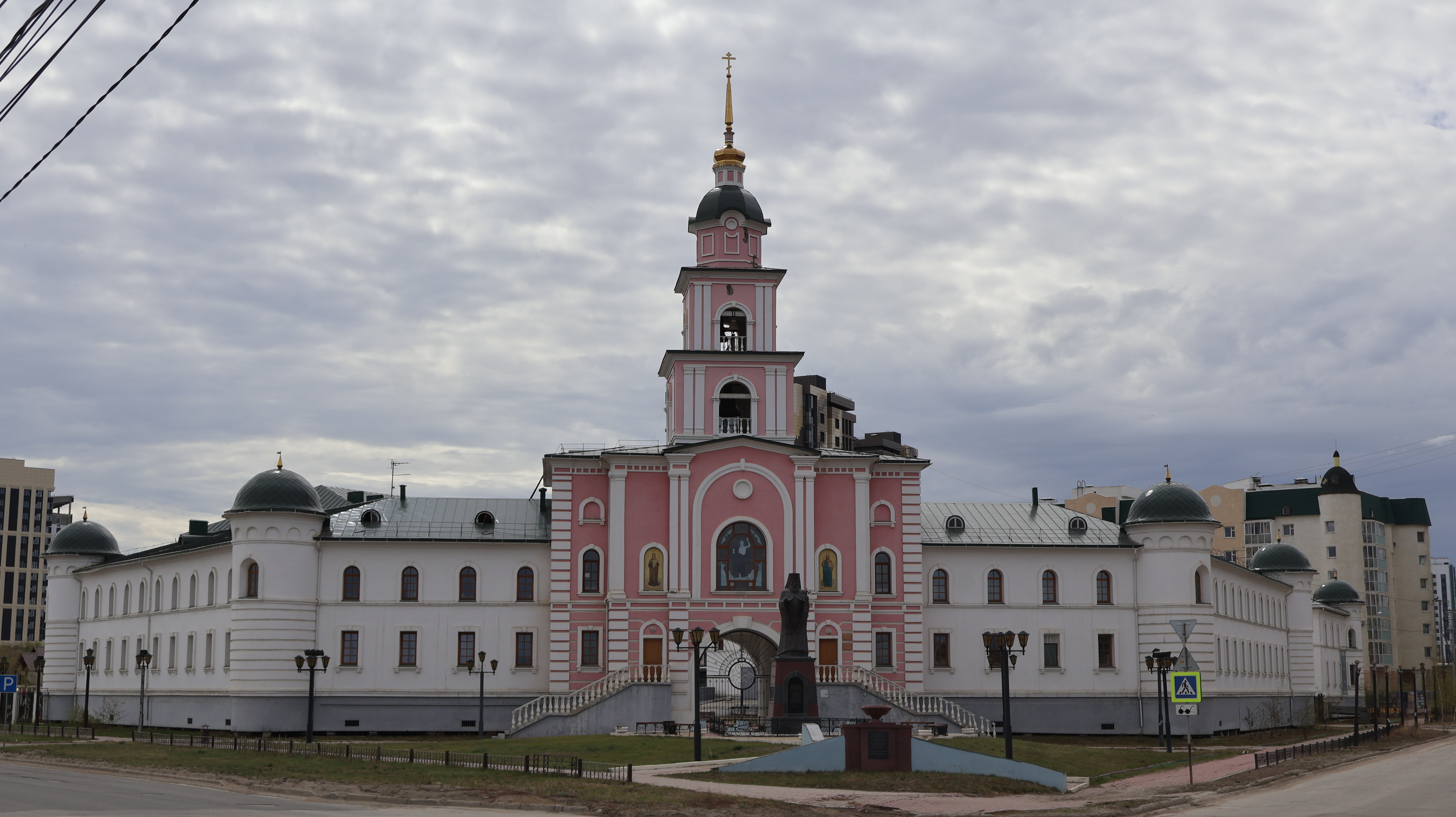
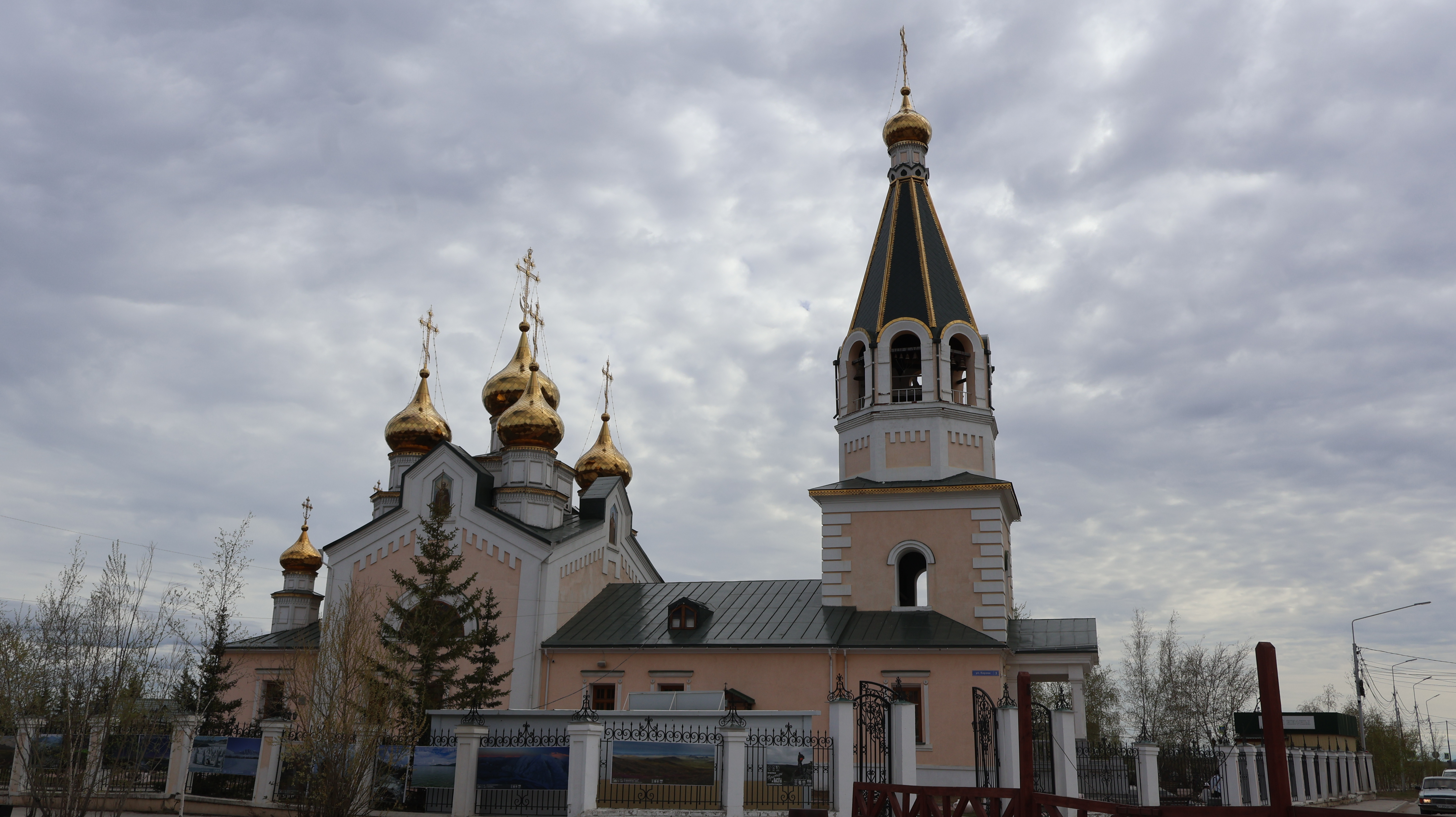
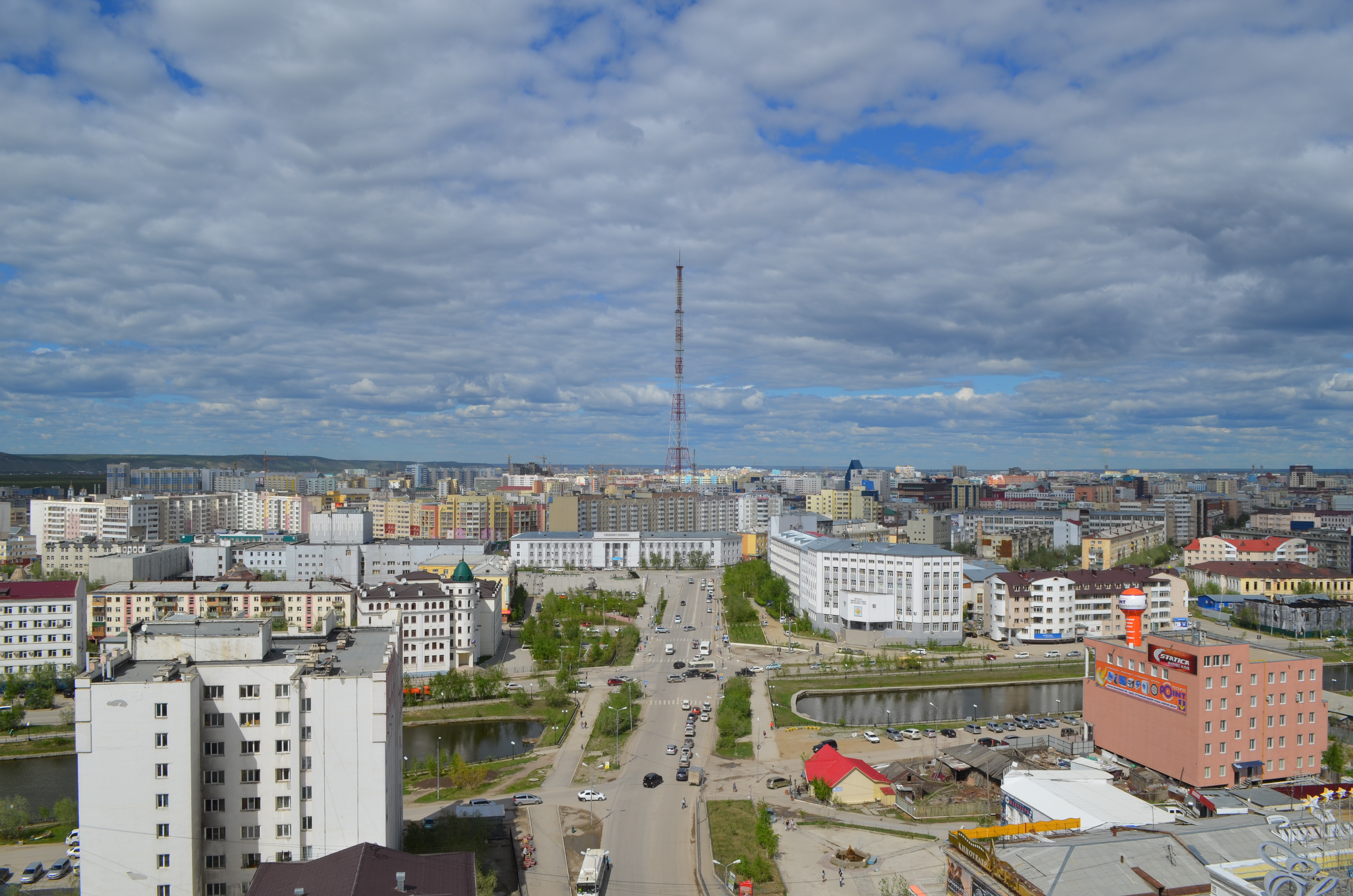
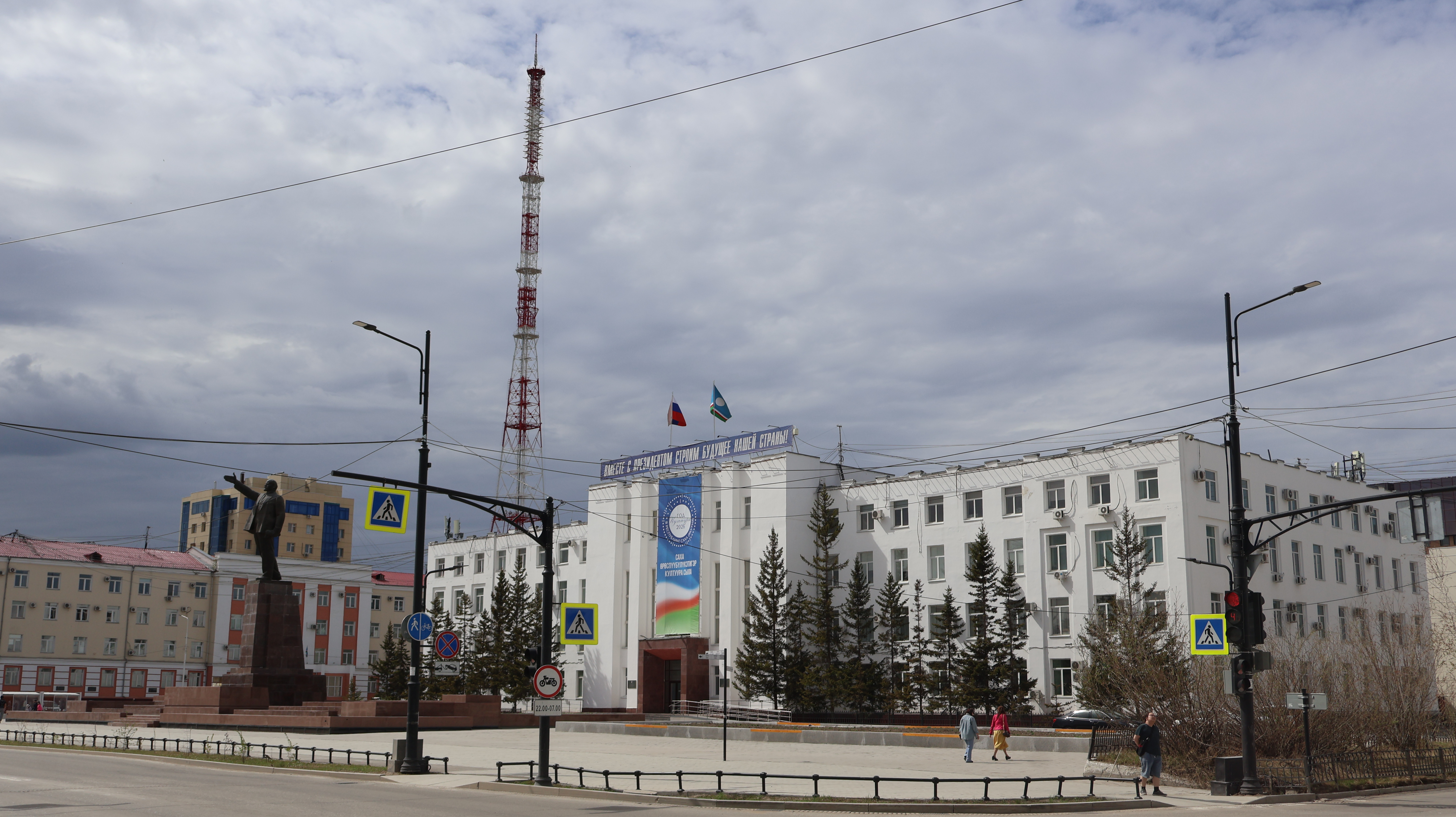
- Aerial view of Yakutsk Prospekt Lenina Yakutsk Theater Yakutsk Theological Seminary Gradoyakutskiy Transfiguration Cathedral business center View of the central part Lenin Square

- Flag Coat of arms
- Interactive map of Yakutsk
- Location of Yakutsk Yakutsk (Sakha Republic)
- Coordinates: 62°01′48″N 129°43′48″E
- Country: Russia
- Federal subject: Sakha Republic
- Founded: 1632
- City status since: 1643

Government
  - Body: Okrug Council
  - Head: Evgeny Grigoriev

Area
  - Total: 122 km^{2} (47 sq mi)
- Elevation: 95 m (312 ft)

Population (2010 Census)
  - Total: 282,419
  - Estimate (1 January 2018): 311,760 (+10.4%)
  - Rank: 68th in 2010
  - Density: 2,310/km^{2} (6,000/sq mi)

Administrative status
  - Subordinated to: City of republic significance of Yakutsk
  - Capital of: Sakha Republic
  - Capital of: city of republic significance of Yakutsk

Municipal status
  - Urban okrug: Yakutsk Urban Okrug
  - Capital of: Yakutsk Urban Okrug
- Time zone: UTC+9 (MSK+6)
- Postal code: 677xxx
- Dialing code: +7 4112
- OKTMO ID: 98701000001
- City Day: Second Sunday of September

Yakutsk (Note: /jəˈkuːtsk/ yə-KOOTSK; Russian: Якутск [jɪˈkutsk]; Yakut: Дьокуускай, romanized: Cokuuskay, pronounced [ɟ͡ʝoquːskáɪ].) is the capital and largest city of Sakha, Russia, located about 450 km (280 mi) south of the Arctic Circle. Fueled by the mining industry, Yakutsk has become one of Russia's most rapidly growing regional cities, with a population of 355,443 at the 2021 census.

Yakutsk has an average annual temperature of −8.0 °C (17.6 °F), winter high temperatures consistently well below −20 °C (−4 °F), and a record low of −64.4 °C (−83.9 °F) has been recorded.

As a result, Yakutsk is the coldest city of over 200,000 people in the world (though a number of smaller towns in that region (and the Northwest Territories and Nunavut (Note: See the climate data on the Wikipedia articles about places in the Northwest Territories and Nunavut)) are colder). Yakutsk is also the largest city located in continuous permafrost; the only other large city is Norilsk, also in Siberia. Yakutsk is in the Central Yakutian Lowland and is a major port on the Lena River. It is served by the Yakutsk Airport as well as the smaller Magan Airport.

== Etymology ==
The city was founded in 1632 by the Cossacks and was originally called either the Lensky fortress or the Yakutsk fortress. The first version of the toponym came from the hydronym "Lena"; the second, from "Yakutia", a synonym for Sakha, eventually became the main one in use. In 1708 it received city status as Yakutsk.

== History ==
=== Before the 17th Century ===
The territory upon which the city of Yakutsk now lies on was inhabited long before the founding of the Russian Lensky Fortress. According to archaeological data (more than 200 sites, settlements, burial sites, and other archaeological monuments have been explored within the city), the oldest of them, the Yubileinaya site, is estimated to be 20,500–10,000 years old. According to legend, the ancestors of the Yakuts, Elley Bootur and Omogoy Bai, settled on the territory of the modern city Archaeological evidence shows the Yakuts settled the Tuymaada Valley in the 13th–16th centuries, as can be seen in the old settlements of Zernovaya-II, Orbita-16, and Vladimirovka-IV, which belong to the Kulun-Atakh archaeological culture, associated with the ancestors of the Yakuts.

When the Yakuts, also known as the Sakha people, migrated to the area from other parts of Siberia, they mixed with other indigenous Siberians such as the Evenk and Yukagir.

=== 17th century ===
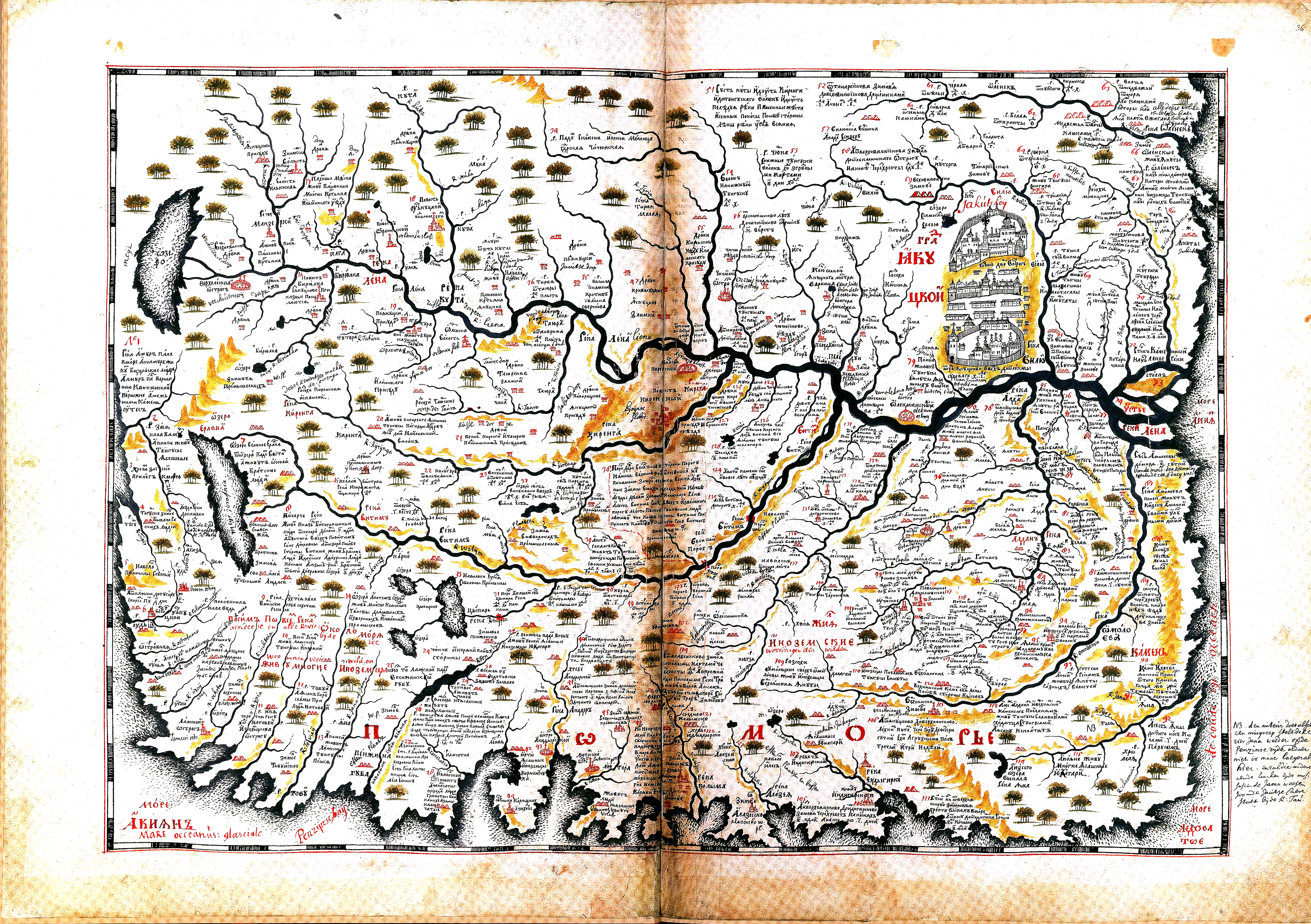
Map of the city of Yakutsk and its surroundings from the late 17th century (Semyon Remezov)

On September 25 (October 5), 1632, a detachment of the Yenisei sotnik Pyotr Beketov, while exploring the banks of the Lena River, established the Lensky Ostrog (Lensky Fort) on the right bank of the river, 70 kilometers downstream from the location of modern-day Yakutsk, on the land of the Borogon Yakuts. From the very beginning, the fort had a rather small population, with its garrison numbering 30 Cossacks. In 1634, it survived a siege by the Yakuts. In 1635, the local Cossacks received the right to be called Yakut Cossacks. In 1638, the fort became the center of the newly formed Yakutsk Voivodeship. In 1642–1643, the fort was relocated to its current site in the Tuymaada Valley.

Following the relocation of the fort to the new site, the first churches were built in the town: the Church of the Life-Giving Trinity and the Church of Saint Michael Maleinos. The exact time of their construction is unknown, but the latter already existed by 1646. In 1641, the Holy Trinity Cathedral was built, which still stands today and awaits restoration. In 1663–1664, the Spassky (Holy Savior) Monastery for men was established near the Yakutsk Ostrog.

=== 18th century ===
Engraving by Mikhail Makhaev. View of the city of Yakutsk in the second half of the 18th century.

In 2024, a corpus of written documents was discovered in Yakutsk, including 14 birch bark letters written in ink in a 17th-century cursive script (with numbers written in letters). Archaeologists believe they belong to the archives of the voivode's chancery, lost in a fire in 1700. One fragment speaks of the collection of yasak. In 2025, a paper letter-appeal was found addressed to Archimandrite Feofan, who was the abbot of the Spassky Monastery in Yakutsk from 1714 to 1719.

The construction of the stone Trinity Cathedral was completed in 1728. In 1800, at the request of Ilya Shadrin, the Prince of the Khangalas Ulus, a theological seminary was opened.

=== 19th century ===
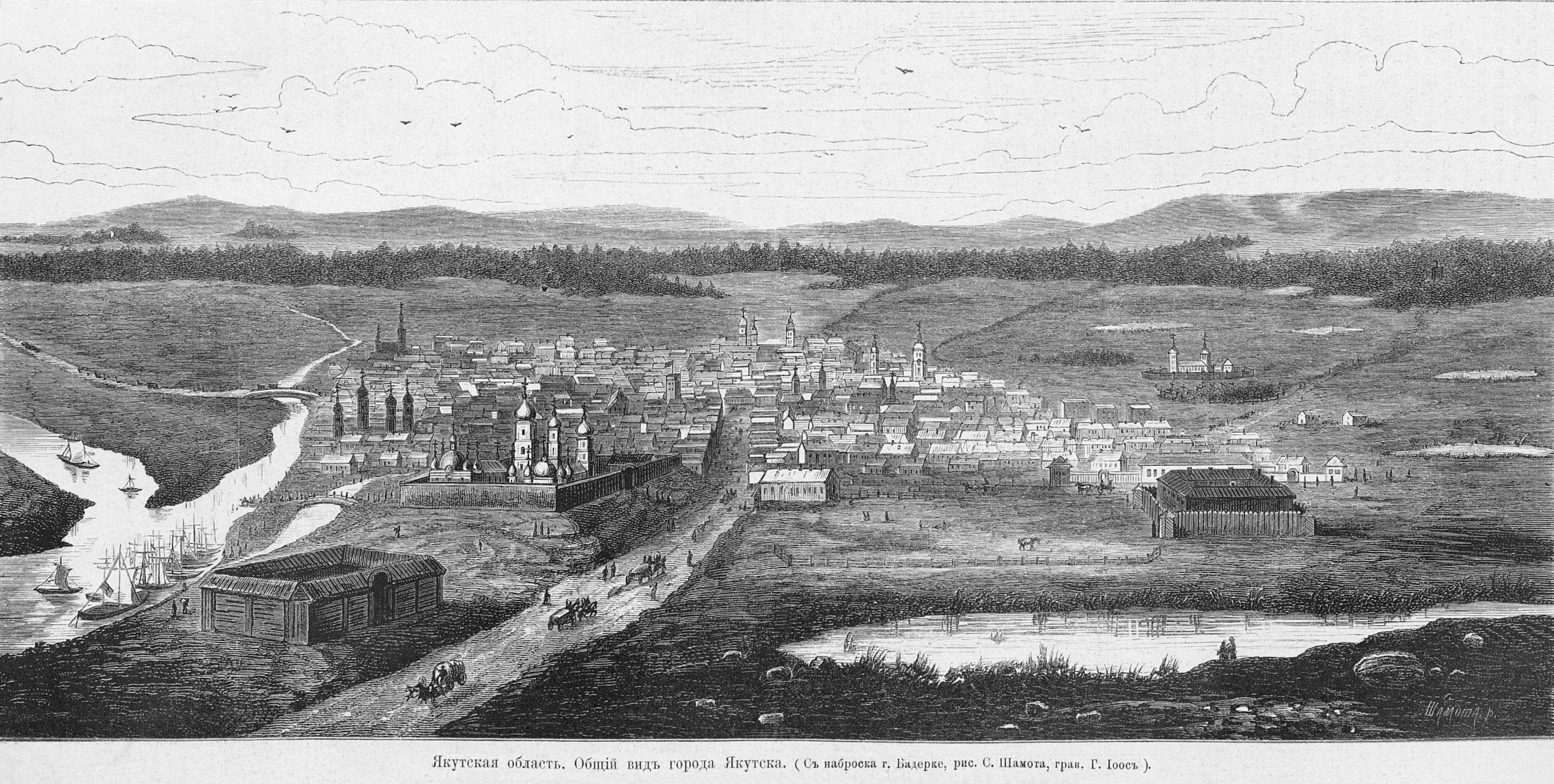
General view of Yakutsk in 1878

In 1818, it was transformed into the Yakutsk Theological School. In 1870, an imperial decree established a separate Yakutsk-Vilyuysk (now Yakutsk and Lenska) Diocese with its see in Yakutsk. Following the revolution, the parishes were destroyed or abandoned, and the diocese was abolished, only to be restored in 1993.

In the 18th century, Yakutsk served as the starting point for the famous expeditions of brave Russian explorers and seafarers who earned fame through major geographical discoveries, including Mikhail Stadukhin, Semyon Dezhnev, Vladimir Atlasov, Ivan Moskvitin, Vasily Poyarkov, and Yerofey Khabarov.

Semyon Remezov's "Drawing Book of Siberia" features one of the oldest known depictions of Yakutsk, illustrated as follows: first, at the bottom of the drawing, there is an oval area enclosed by a stockade, with a bell tower on the left and several churches inside; second, in the middle of the drawing runs a wall with three towers, two at the ends and one in the center; third, at the top of the drawing, roughly parallel to the first wall, stands a second identical wall, but with five towers, including a tall central one topped with an eagle on a spire, and the remaining four positioned two at each end, with the outermost ones shown as log structures. Within this wall, a palisade forms an approximate octagon, which, judging by the nature of the buildings, encloses the main part of the city. The drawing was compiled solely based on testimonies from various individuals and therefore cannot be considered an exact representation of Yakutsk; it provides only an approximate idea of the city's appearance at that time.

As the military-administrative and commercial center of the entire Lena region, Yakutsk was subordinated to the established Siberia Governorate starting from 1708, and to the East Siberian General-Government from 1822. In 1822, Yakutsk became a regional city, and in 1851, Yakutia received the status of an independent oblast with the rights of a governorate, centered in Yakutsk.

=== 20th century ===
==== Russian Civil War ====
During the Civil War, numerous battles took place in the Yakutsk Oblast. In the course of the October Revolution, Soviet power was not established in Yakutia, and control remained in the hands of the provisional government's supporters. On June 30, 1918, the first clash occurred in Yakutsk between the Whites and an arriving detachment of the Reds under the command of Rydzinsky, resulting in the partial establishment of Soviet power in Yakutia. However, a month and a half later, on August 5, 1918, the Soviet authorities were dissolved. The regional and zemstvo administrations were restored, and all decrees of the Soviet power were annulled. During a Bolshevik uprising on the night of December 14–15, 1919, the Kolchak government was overthrown, and Soviet power was proclaimed once again.

In 1922, the White general Anatoly Pepelyayev launched an offensive on Yakutsk with the goal of a further advance into Siberia to proclaim a Siberian Republic there, which became the final episode of the Russian Civil War. However, on February 14, 1923, Pepelyayev's squad was stopped by Ivan Strod's Red detachment in the Sasyl-Sysyy tract near the village of Amga. In Soviet historiography, this battle became known as the "Ice Siege": under conditions of the harshest Yakutian frosts, a battle was fought between the Red soldiers defending the approaches to Yakutsk under the command of Ivan Strod and the raiding squad of the White Siberian general Anatoly Pepelyayev. As a result of the battles near Amga, the last major military formation of the Whites on the territory of the RSFSR was defeated; the general himself retreated to the coast of the Sea of Okhotsk and was captured.

=== The Soviet period ===
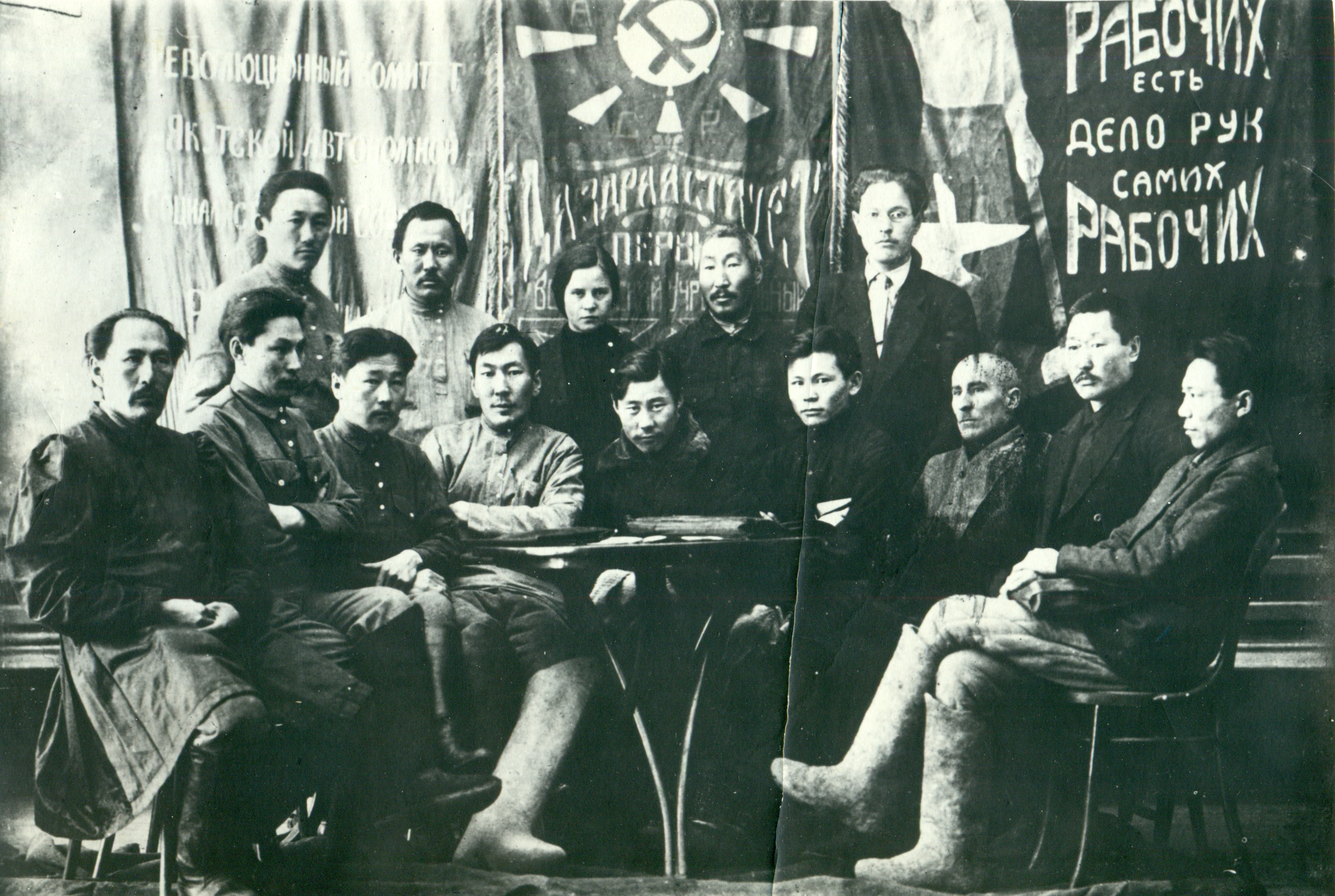
Members of the Presidium of the First All-Yakut Constituent Congress of Soviets

As a result of the Civil War, Soviet power was established in the Yakutsk Oblast. By October 1921, Platon Oyunsky, the deputy chairman of the Yakutsk Regional Revolutionary Committee (who became the leader of Yakutia and chairman of the Council of People's Commissars of the Yakut ASSR from 1922), had developed drafts for the "Declaration of Rights and Duties of the Working People of the Yakut ASSR" and the "Regulation on the Autonomy of the Yakut Republic." By the beginning of 1922, the work to create the republic was completed, and based on these documents, the Yakut Autonomous Soviet Socialist Republic was formed on April 27, 1922, marking the first statehood in the history of the Yakut people. Yakutsk became the capital of the republic.

In the 1930s, a research institute was established in Yakutsk for the first time, and the republic reached a new level of public education and science.

During the Great Patriotic War, the headquarters of an aviation division and the administration of the Alsib air route were located in Yakutsk. Through this route, about 8,000 fighters and bombers received under Lend-Lease were delivered from the United States to the front. In the city, the neighborhood where the Alsib headquarters was located during the war still retains the name Aviagruppa.

Following the Great Patriotic War, the accelerated industrial development of the region's mineral resources led to an influx of a large number of specialists and workers from other regions of the country. Additionally, population growth was driven by a post-war compensatory baby boom and the gradual stabilization of the population structure, which had been distorted during the war. Over a 20-year period (1939–1959), the city's population increased 1.4 times.

During these years, Yakutsk became the main hub for the concentration of the urban population in the republic. A construction complex was created in the city and its suburban settlements, and enterprises in the wood processing, coal, light, and food industries expanded. Yakutsk became a major hub for water, road, and air transport.

In March 1986, a clash occurred at Lake Tyoploye, which reports indicated was on inter-ethnic grounds and later escalated into a more serious conflict that engulfed Yakutsk and lasted for three days. It began due to a fight between Russians and Yakut students from Yakutsk State University, which initially had a mundane nature. Members of the regional and city committees of the CPSU failed to see an inter-ethnic undertone in the conflict, underestimating the danger of it escalating into nationalist demonstrations. Only when a crowd moved through the city with the slogan "Yakutia for Yakuts, down with Russians!" did the authorities begin to take measures. Around 100 people were detained, and three individuals from each side stood trial, receiving sentences of up to 4 years.

=== 21th century ===
In 2012, the reconstruction of Yakutsk Airport was completed, transforming it into a modern international airport complex. In the 2010s, the Amur–Yakutsk Mainline was extended directly to the vicinity of the city (terminating at Nizhny Bestyakh station on the opposite bank of the Lena River), which qualitatively transformed the logistics of cargo delivery. In 2010, the M. K. Ammosov North-Eastern Federal University (NEFU) was established on the basis of Yakutsk State University. This attracted thousands of students from across the Far East and from abroad, turning Yakutsk into one of the region's major student cities. By the 2020s, Yakutsk had become one of the fastest-growing cities in Siberia and the Russian Far East in terms of population. While the population stood at approximately 190,000 in the 1990s, by 2026 it significantly exceeded 360,000 people (including subordinate rural settlements). This growth was driven both by migration from rural areas of the republic and by natural population increase.

== Climate ==
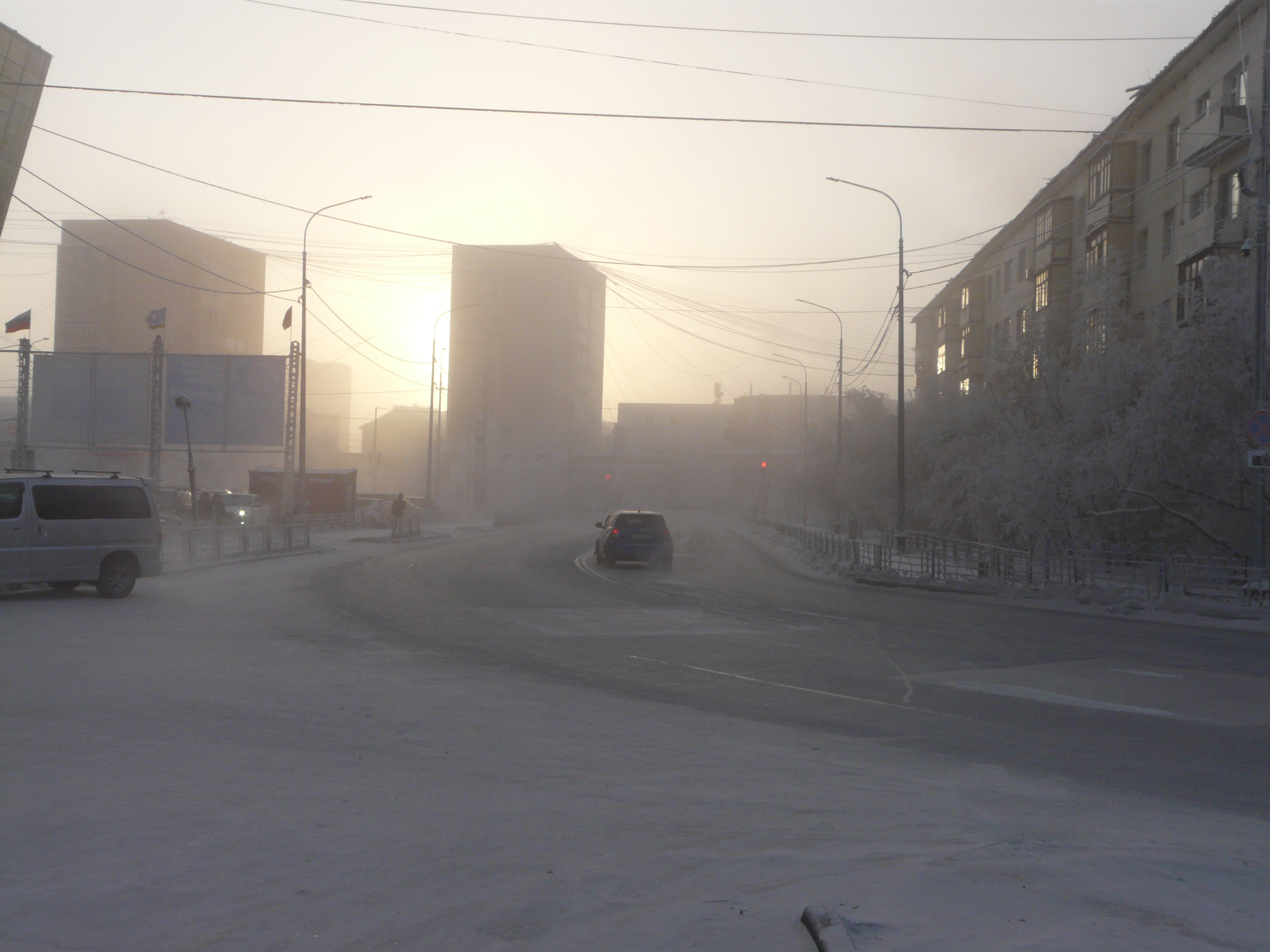
Winter fog on Kurashova Street in Yakutsk

Yakutsk

Climate chart (precipitation, max. and min. temperature)
J	F	M	A	M	J	J	A	S	O	N	D
10 −36 −42	9 −28 −37	6 −12 −26	8 3 −10	20 14 2	30 23 10	40 26 13	37 22 9	30 12 1	19 −3 −11	17 −22 −30	9 −34 −40
- █ Average max. and min. temperatures in °C
- █ Precipitation totals in mm
Imperial conversion
J	F	M	A	M	J	J	A	S	O	N	D
0.4 −33 −44	0.4 −18 −35	0.2 11 −15	0.3 37 13	0.8 57 35	1.2 74 50	1.6 78 56	1.5 71 49	1.2 53 34	0.7 27 12	0.7 −8 −21	0.4 −30 −39
- █ Average max. and min. temperatures in °F
- █ Precipitation totals in inches

With an intensely continental subarctic climate (Köppen climate classification Dfc, bordering on Dfd, Trewartha Ecbd), Yakutsk has the coldest winter temperatures for any city its size or larger on Earth. Average monthly temperatures in Yakutsk range from −36.9 °C (−34.4 °F) in January to +19.9 °C (67.8 °F) in July. Yakutsk is the largest city built on continuous permafrost, and many houses there are built on concrete piles.

The lowest temperatures ever recorded on Earth outside Antarctica and Greenland have occurred in the basin of the Yana River to the northeast of Yakutsk. Winters are extremely cold and long: Yakutsk has never recorded a temperature above freezing between November 10 and March 14. Summers are sunny, warm and occasionally hot (though short), with daily maximum temperatures exceeding +30 °C (86 °F), making the seasonal temperature differences for the region the greatest in the world at 102 °C (184 °F). The lowest temperature recorded in Yakutsk was −64.4 °C (−83.9 °F) on February 5, 1891, and the highest temperatures +38.4 °C (101.1 °F) on July 17, 2011, and +38.3 °C (100.9 °F) on July 15, 1942. The hottest month in records going back to 1834 has been July 1894, with a mean of +23.2 °C (73.8 °F), and the coldest, January 1900, which averaged −51.4 °C (−60.5 °F). Yakutsk is the largest city in the world with an average winter temperature of below −30 °C (−22 °F).

Yakutsk is an inland location, being almost 1,000 km (620 mi) from the Pacific Ocean, which, coupled with the high latitude, means exposure to severe winters and lack of temperature moderation. July temperatures soar to an above-normal average for this latitude, with the average being several degrees hotter than more southerly Far East cities such as Vladivostok or Yuzhno-Sakhalinsk. The July daytime temperatures are even hotter than some maritime subtropical areas. The warm summers ensure that Yakutsk, despite its freezing winters, is far south of the tree line.

The climate is quite dry, with most of the annual precipitation occurring in the summer months, due to the intense Siberian High forming around the very cold continental air during the winter. However, summer precipitation is not heavy since the moist southeasterly winds from the Pacific Ocean lose their moisture over the coastal mountains well before reaching the Lena Valley.

Climate data for Yakutsk/Jakutsk weather station (WMO identifier: 24959), 98.3m amsl, 1991−2020 normals, extremes 1829–present
Month	Jan	Feb	Mar	Apr	May	Jun	Jul	Aug	Sep	Oct	Nov	Dec	Year
Record high °C (°F)	−5.8 (21.6)	−2.2 (28.0)	8.3 (46.9)	21.1 (70.0)	31.1 (88.0)	35.4 (95.7)	38.4 (101.1)	35.4 (95.7)	27.0 (80.6)	20.5 (68.9)	3.9 (39.0)	−3.9 (25.0)	38.4 (101.1)
Mean daily maximum °C (°F)	−34.0 (−29.2)	−27.9 (−18.2)	−11.6 (11.1)	2.6 (36.7)	13.8 (56.8)	23.1 (73.6)	25.8 (78.4)	21.8 (71.2)	11.9 (53.4)	−3.0 (26.6)	−22.3 (−8.1)	−34.4 (−29.9)	−2.8 (27.0)
Daily mean °C (°F)	−36.9 (−34.4)	−32.9 (−27.2)	−19.1 (−2.4)	−3.7 (25.3)	8.0 (46.4)	17.0 (62.6)	19.9 (67.8)	15.6 (60.1)	6.4 (43.5)	−6.9 (19.6)	−25.9 (−14.6)	−37.0 (−34.6)	−8.0 (17.6)
Mean daily minimum °C (°F)	−39.8 (−39.6)	−37.2 (−35.0)	−26.0 (−14.8)	−10.4 (13.3)	1.5 (34.7)	9.8 (49.6)	13.1 (55.6)	9.3 (48.7)	1.3 (34.3)	−11.0 (12.2)	−29.6 (−21.3)	−39.5 (−39.1)	−13.2 (8.2)
Record low °C (°F)	−63.0 (−81.4)	−64.4 (−83.9)	−54.9 (−66.8)	−41.0 (−41.8)	−18.1 (−0.6)	−5.4 (22.3)	−1.5 (29.3)	−7.8 (18.0)	−14.2 (6.4)	−40.9 (−41.6)	−54.5 (−66.1)	−59.8 (−75.6)	−64.4 (−83.9)
Average precipitation mm (inches)	10 (0.4)	9 (0.4)	6 (0.2)	8 (0.3)	20 (0.8)	30 (1.2)	40 (1.6)	37 (1.5)	30 (1.2)	19 (0.7)	17 (0.7)	9 (0.4)	235 (9.3)
Average extreme snow depth cm (inches)	27 (11)	31 (12)	33 (13)	21 (8.3)	0 (0)	0 (0)	0 (0)	0 (0)	0 (0)	4 (1.6)	15 (5.9)	22 (8.7)	33 (13)
Average rainy days	0	0	0.2	3	13	14	14	14	14	3	0.1	0	75
Average snowy days	26	24	16	9	3	0.2	0.03	0.1	3	24	27	25	157
Average relative humidity (%)	76	76	70	59	53	56	62	68	71	78	78	75	69
Mean monthly sunshine hours	20.7	102.6	252.8	296.8	288.2	334.8	334.0	262.9	170.1	96.3	66.9	11.5	2,251.1
Percentage possible sunshine	11	42	70	67	52	57	58	54	45	32	33	7	50
Average ultraviolet index	1	1	1	2	4	6	5	4	2	1	1	1	2
Source 1: Погода и Климат
Source 2: NOAA and Weather Atlas (uv index)

Climate data for Jakutsk/Yakutsk Airport (YKS) weather station (ICAO code: UEEE), 100m amsl, between 1985 and 2015
Month	Jan	Feb	Mar	Apr	May	Jun	Jul	Aug	Sep	Oct	Nov	Dec	Year
Average dew point °C (°F)	−42 (−44)	−37 (−35)	−24 (−11)	−11 (12)	−2 (28)	7 (45)	11 (52)	9 (48)	1 (34)	−11 (12)	−30 (−22)	−41 (−42)	−14 (6)
Source: Time and Date

== Economy ==
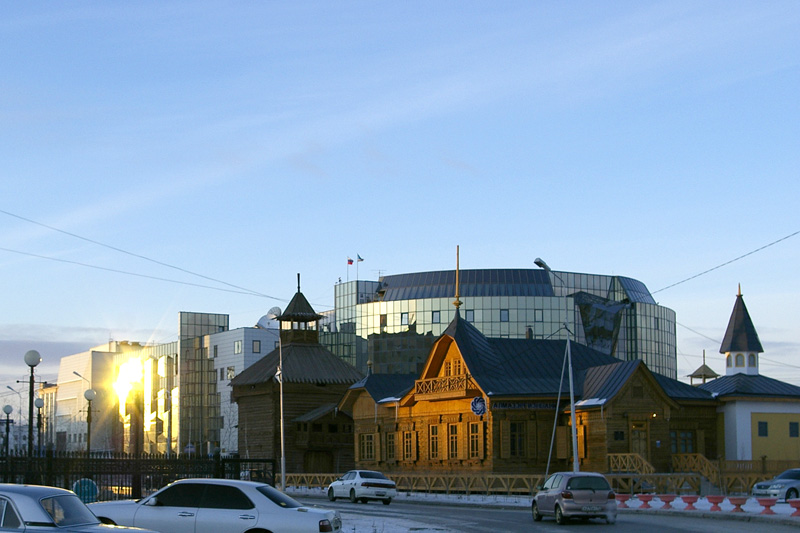
Yakutsk building of a Russo-Asian bank

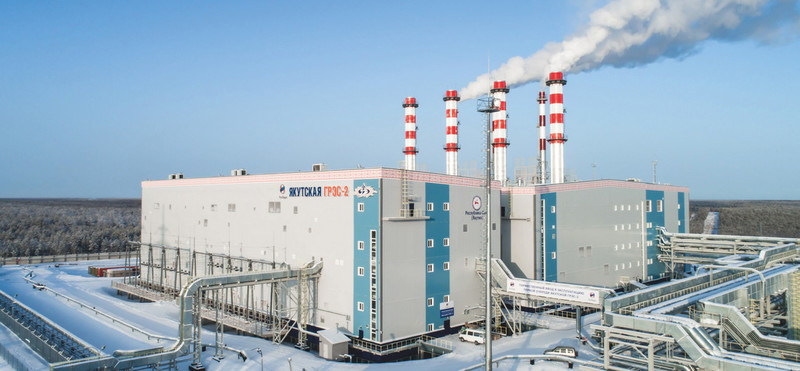
Yakutsk GRES-2 power station

The primary economic activity stems from mining activities in the region, particularly coal, gold, and diamonds, with multiple mining companies having set up their headquarters in the city. Precious stones and metals, particularly diamonds, as well as coal, are Yakutsk's major exports. The export volume was $5.55 billion in 2021, making it the 16th largest out of eighty-five of Russia's federal subjects, although it contracted sharply (under $1 billion) in 2022.

Yakutsk Airport is the main airport, and Yakutia Airlines has its head office in the city, operating flights between Yakutsk and other main Russian cities.

Tourism as an economic sector plays a small but growing role, thanks to the city's unique cultural heritage and natural attractions such as the Lena Pillars Nature Park, a UNESCO World Heritage Site, and the Permafrost Kingdom, which is a tourist complex dedicated to showcasing the unique features of the region's permafrost. With the Lena River navigable in the summer, there are boat cruises offered, including upriver to the Lena Pillars, and downriver tours which visit spectacular scenery in the lower reaches and the Lena Delta.

In recent years, housing construction, with an emphasis on providing affordable housing, has been a focus, which was accompanied by the growth in the construction materials manufacturing.

A sizeable portion of the republic's agricultural sector is in Yakutsk, which accounts for 89% of the republic's meat and 34% of the republic's dairy production.

== Culture ==
Left to right from the top: Pushkin Dramatic Theatre, Sakha Academic Theatre, Sivtsev Yakut State Opera and Ballet Theatre, National Art Museum of Yakutia, Yakutsk Regional Museum Building

There are several theaters in Yakutsk: the State Russian Drama Theater, named after A. S. Pushkin; the Sakha Theater, named after P. A. Oiyunsky; the Suorun Omoloon Young Spectator's Theater; and the State Academic Opera and Ballet Theater, named after D. K. Sivtsev.

Museums include the National Fine Arts Museum of Sakha; the Museum of Local Lore and History, named after E. Yaroslavsky; and the only museums in the world dedicated to the khomus and permafrost. In September 2020, the Gagarin Center for Culture and Contemporary Art was opened in the Gagarin District of Yakutsk.

In 2021, the construction of the "State Philharmonic of Yakutia. The Arctic Center of Epos and Arts" began.

The annual Ysyakh summer festival takes place the last weekend in June. The traditional Yakut summer solstice festivities include a celebration of the revival and renewal of the nature, fertility and beginning of a new year. It is accompanied by national Yakut rituals and ceremonies, folk dancing, horse racing, Yakut ethnic music and singing, national cuisine, and competitions in traditional Yakut sports.

There is a local punk scene in Yakutsk, with many bands.

The city has developed a notable regional film industry, which has attracted international attention for its portrayal of the region and its people. The industry has come to be nicknamed "Sakhawood".

People in Yakutsk wear very fluffy and fuzzy clothing, and in extremely cold weather they cope by sheltering indoors in warm housing, which is believed to lower Yakutsk's increase in winter mortality rates compared to the seasonal rise in mortality seen in milder regions of the world.

== Demographics ==
Historical population
Year	Pop.	±%
1897	6,535	—
1926	10,558	+61.6%
1939	52,882	+400.9%
1959	74,330	+40.6%
1970	107,617	+44.8%
1979	152,368	+41.6%
1989	186,626	+22.5%
2002	210,642	+12.9%
2010	269,601	+28.0%
2021	355,443	+31.8%
2025	372,801	+4.9%
Sources: Census data, estimate

According to Rosstat estimates for 2025, the population of Yakutsk is 372,801 in the city proper and 390,236 in the city's urban area, which is more than one third of the total population of Sakha.

In the 2021 Census, the following ethnic groups were listed:

- Yakuts: 59.2%
- Russians: 26.4%
- Kyrgyz: 3.4%
- Evenks: 1.9%
- Tajiks: 1.7%
- Chinese: 1.4%
- Armenians: 1.1%
- Other ethnicities: 4.9%

== Religion ==
Left to right from the top: The Transfiguration Cathedral of Yakutsk, The St. Nicholas Cathedral of the City of Yakutsk, The Church of the Nativity of the Most Holy Mother of God, The Church of the Exaltation of the Holy Cross

Orthodox Christianity is the most widely professed faith in Yakutsk, with significant populations of the adherents of Shamanism and Rodnovery. A sizeable share of the city's residents is non-religious. The city's two main ethnic groups, the Turkic speaking Yakuts and the Slavic speaking Russians, are primarily Christian. The world largest temple of the Aiyy Faith is also located in Yakutsk. There is also a mosque in Yakutsk.

=== Christianity ===
==== Orthodoxy ====
Yakutsk historically developed as an Orthodox Christian city, with its first churches built as early as the 1630s, though none have survived to the present day. In 1641, the Holy Trinity Cathedral was opened in the city, and the construction of its new stone building began in 1708. For a long time, it served as the main cathedral in Yakutia. However, due to the religious policy of the USSR, the cathedral was closed in 1929. Currently, the church stands abandoned, but a reconstruction is expected.

Apart from the Holy Trinity Cathedral, there are many other churches in Yakutsk. For instance, one of the most famous is the Holy Transfiguration Cathedral, which has become one of the city's main symbols and landmarks. Following the dissolution of the Soviet Union, the Yakutsk Diocese and its churches were actively revived; historical shrines were restored, and several new churches were opened in recent years. Examples include the All Saints Church near the airport and the Church of the Exaltation of the Holy Cross. Today, Orthodox Christianity is the predominant religion in Yakutsk among both the Yakut and Russian populations.

==== Catholicism ====
The Roman Catholic Church of the Holy Trinity

In the pre-revolutionary period, Catholicism in Yakutsk was predominantly practiced among exiled Poles and, according to some reports, Swedes. In the 1990s, following the dissolution of the USSR, Russia and Yakutia experienced a boom in foreign religions. In 1994, priests from the Catholic congregation of the Salesians of Don Bosco began their mission in Yakutia. In 2009, the large Roman Catholic Church of the Holy Trinity was opened in Yakutia, serving as the main cathedral for Catholics in the region.

==== Protestantism ====
International Christian New Apostolic Church

The active development of Protestantism began in the 1990s following the adoption of the USSR law on freedom of religion. Missionaries from other regions of Russia and from abroad arrived in Yakutia. A distinctive feature of this period was the widespread conversion to Protestantism among the indigenous peoples of Yakutia, including the Yakuts, Evenks, and Evens. Protestant communities translated the Bible and liturgical texts into the Yakut language, which facilitated their integration among the local population. Protestant organizations in Yakutia are actively involved in community and social work. They establish rehabilitation centers for individuals with drug and alcohol addictions, assist the homeless, organize charitable meals, and participate in volunteer projects. These activities are regulated by federal legislation on freedom of conscience and religious associations. Protestant communities exist in Yakutsk and several other settlements. In the 2000s, a New Apostolic church, which belongs to Protestantism, was built in Yakutsk; however, in 2014, it was sold and converted into a shopping center.

==== Armenian Apostolic Church ====
Armenian Church of St. Karapet

The construction of the Surb Karapet (Holy Forerunner) Church began in 2011 on the initiative and at the expense of the local Armenian cultural center. The building's design was executed in the traditional Armenian architectural style, and pink volcanic tuff, specially imported from Armenia, was used for its cladding. The consecration of the church took place on September 7, 2014. The consecration ceremony was performed by Archbishop Ezras, the head of the Russian and Novo-Nakhichevan Diocese of the Armenian Apostolic Church. The Surb Karapet Church became the northernmost temple of the Armenian Apostolic Church in the world.

== Administrative and municipal status ==
Yakutsk is the capital of the Sakha Republic. As an inhabited locality, Yakutsk is classified as a city under republic jurisdiction. Within the framework of administrative divisions, it is, together with the settlement of Zhatay and eleven rural localities, incorporated as the city of republic significance of Yakutsk—an administrative unit with a status equal to that of the districts. As a municipal division, Yakutsk and the eleven rural localities are incorporated as Yakutsk Urban Okrug. The settlement of Zhatay is not a part of Yakutsk Urban Okrug and is independently incorporated as Zhatay Urban Okrug.

Municipal composition of Yakutsk Urban Okrug
Towns Cities	Population	Male	Female	Inhabited localities in jurisdiction
City of Yakutsk (Якутск)	360,194	170,872 (47.4%)	189,322 (52.6%)	**City of Yakutsk**; selo of Magan; selo of Namtsyr; selo of Staraya Tabaga; selo of Tabaga
Urban settlements	Population	Male	Female	Inhabited localities in jurisdiction
Zhatay Urban Okrug (Жатай)	11,436	5,647 (49.4%)	5,789 (50.6%)	**Urban-type settlement of Zhatay**
Rural settlements	Population	Male	Female	Rural localities in jurisdiction*
Tulagino-Kildemsky Nasleg (Тулагино-Кильдемский)	3,898	1,898 (48.7%)	2,000 (51.3%)	**selo of Tulagino**; selo of Kapitonovka; selo of Kildyamtsy; selo of Syrdakh
Khatassky Nasleg (Хатасский)	8,836	4,273 (48.4%)	4,563 (51.6%)	**selo of Khatassy**; selo of Vladimirovka; selo of Prigorodny

Divisional source:
Population source:
*Administrative centers are shown in bold

== Transportation ==
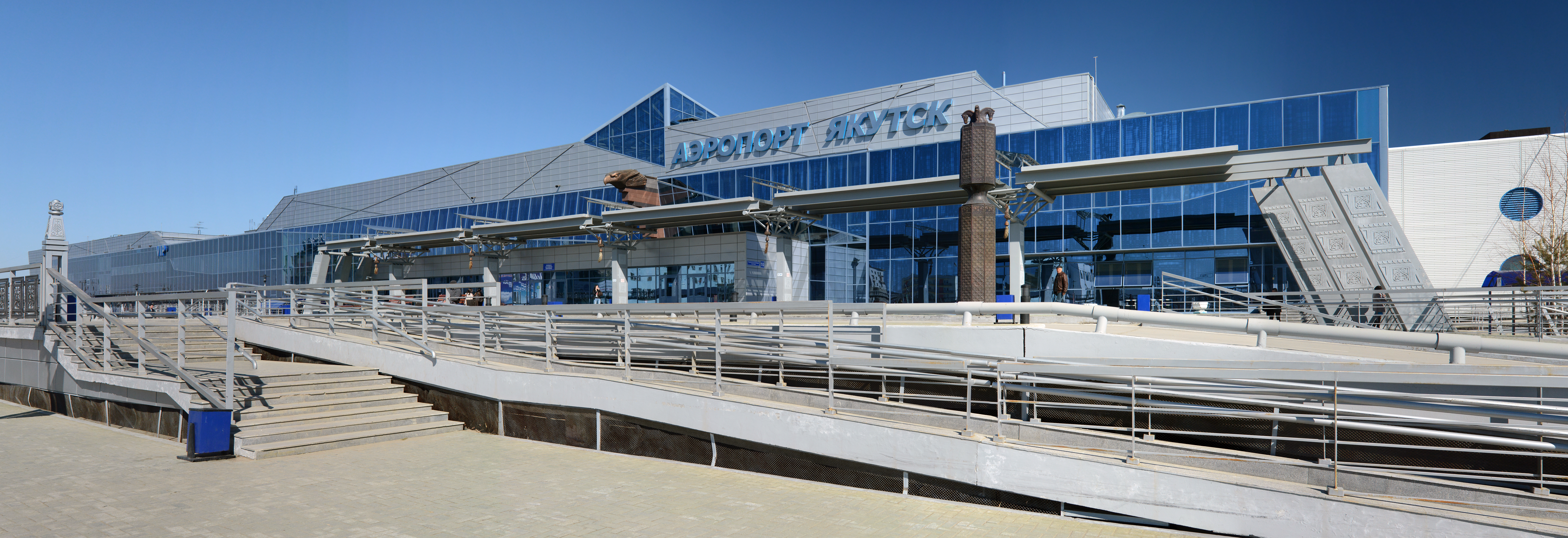
Left to right from the top: Yakutsk International Airport, Bus Station Building, City bus, River port, Namsky Tract, Pokrovskoe Highway

Yakutsk is a destination of the Lena Highway. The city's connection to that highway is only usable by ferry in the summer, or in the dead of winter, by driving directly over the frozen Lena River, since Yakutsk lies entirely on its western bank, and there is no bridge anywhere in the Sakha Republic that crosses the Lena. In the dead of winter, the frozen Lena River makes for a passable highway for ice truckers using its channel to deliver provisions to far-flung outposts. The river is impassable for long periods of the year when it contains loose ice, when the ice cover is not thick enough to support traffic, or when the water level is too high and the river is turbulent with spring flooding. The highway ends on the eastern bank of Lena in Nizhny Bestyakh (Нижний Бестях), an urban-type settlement of some four thousand people. Nizhny Bestyakh is connected with Magadan by the Kolyma Highway.

Construction of a highway bridge over the River Lena to Yakutsk was approved by president Vladimir Putin on November 9, 2019. Based upon a design submitted in 2008, it will be over 3 km (1.9 mi) long and constructed 40 km (25 mi) upriver at Staraya Tabaga, where the river narrows and does not create a wide flooded area in spring. The cost of the bridge and its 10.9 km (6.8 mi) of approaches was estimated at 63.7 billion Rubles (83 billion rubles including VAT [НДС]), of which a grant of 54.2 billion Rubles was to be provided, with the remainder to be sourced from investors. The bridge will be toll-free for cars, with a toll for trucks. Work commenced in 2024, with an estimated cost of 130 billion Rubles and a proposed completion date of 2028.

The bridge had originally been planned to be a dual-use railroad and highway bridge so the Amur–Yakutsk Mainline, the North–South railroad being extended from the south, could connect the city with the East–West Baikal–Amur Mainline. The railroad reached the settlement of Nizhny Bestyakh, on the opposite bank of the Lena from Yakutsk, in November 2011.

The 2019 completion of a new rail line to the eastern bank of the Lena permitted the start of passenger rail services between Yakutsk and the rest of Russia.

Yakutsk is also connected to other parts of Russia by Yakutsk Airport.

== Education and research ==
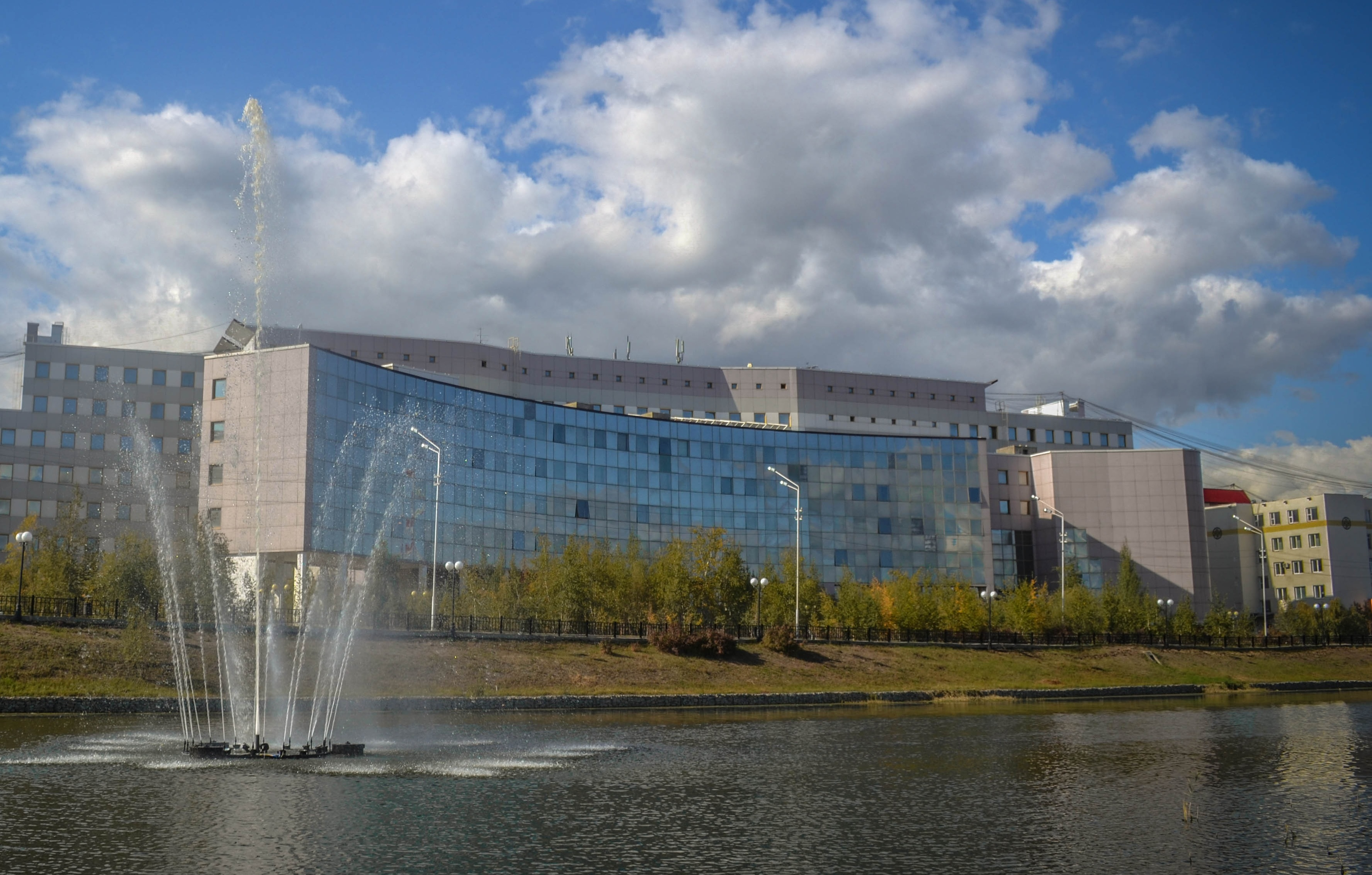
NEFU building

M.K.Ammosov North-Eastern Federal University is in the city. There is also a branch of the Russian Academy of Sciences, which contains, among other things, the Institute of Cosmophysical Research, which runs the Yakutsk Extensive Air Shower installation (one of the largest cosmic-ray detector arrays in the world), and the Melnikov Permafrost Institute, founded in 1960 with the aim of solving the serious and costly problems associated with construction of buildings on frozen soil. In 2020, with global heating thawing the ground, the institute has the only ^{[the only?]} permafrost tunnel in Russia, and is measuring the rate at which the permafrost is thawing, which affects the city as well as the climate.

At the primary and secondary levels, the city has a number of UNESCO Associated Schools, including the Sakha-Turkish College, Sakha-French School, Sakha-Korean School, and School#16.

== Twin towns – sister cities ==
Yakutsk is twinned with:

- Fairbanks, United States
- Harbin, China
- Heihe, China
- Murayama, Japan
- Olympia, Greece
- Velingrad, Bulgaria
- Malang, Indonesia

== Bibliography ==
- Верховный Совет Республики Саха (Якутия). 4 апреля 1992 г. «Конституция (основной закон) Республики Саха (Якутия)», в ред. Конституционного закона №1077-З №1035-IV от 8 июня 2012 г. «О внесении изменений и дополнений в Конституцию (основной закон) Республики Саха (Якутия)». Опубликован: "Якутские ведомости", №7, 26 апреля 1992 г. (Supreme Council of the Sakha (Yakutia) Republic. April 4, 1992 Constitution (Basic Law) of the Sakha (Yakutia) Republic, as amended by the Constitutional Law #1077-Z No. 1035-IV of June 8, 2012 On Amending and Supplementing the Constitution (Basic Law) of the Sakha (Yakutia) Republic. ).
- Государственное Собрание (Ил Тумэн) Республики Саха (Якутия). Закон №174-З №355-III от 30 ноября 2004 г. «Об установлении границ территорий и о наделении статусом городского округа муниципальных образований Республики Саха (Якутия)», в ред. Закона №641-З №177-IV от 29 декабря 2008 г «О внесении изменений в Закон Республики Саха (Якутия) "Об установлении границ территорий и о наделении статусом городского округа муниципальных образований Республики Саха (Якутия)"». Вступил в силу со дня официального опубликования. Опубликован: "Якутия", №243, 29 декабря 2004 г. (State Assembly (Il Tumen) of the Sakha (Yakutia) Republic. Law #174-Z No. 355-III of November 30, 2004 On Establishing the Borders of the Territories and on Granting the Urban Okrug Status to the Municipal Formations of the Sakha (Yakutia) Republic, as amended by the Law #641-Z No. 177-IV of December 29, 2008 On Amending the Law of the Sakha (Yakutia) Republic "On Establishing the Borders of the Territories and on Granting the Urban Okrug Status to the Municipal Formations of the Sakha (Yakutia) Republic". Effective as of the day of the official publication.).
