= Ivan Yazev =

Russian-Soviet astronomer (1895–1955)

Ivan Yazev Иван Язев
- Born: Ivan Naumovich Yazev; 28 September 1895; Tatarsk, Russian Empire (now Tatarsk, Russia)
- Died: 18 April 1955 (aged 59); Irkutsk, Russian SFSR, Soviet Union (now Irkutsk, Russia)
- Education: Omsk State Agrarian University
- Children: 2
- Relatives: Sergei Arkturovich Yazev (grandson)
- Scientific career
- Fields: astronomy, geodesy
- Thesis: Влияние космических причин на движение земного полюса

Ivan Naumovich Yazev (Russian: Иван Наумович Язев; 28 September 1895 – 18 April 1955) was a Soviet astronomer, geodesist, and professor. Born to a peasant family in Russia, he spawned a dynasty of Russian astronomers, including Sergei Arkturovich Yazev, who served as the head of Irkutsk State University's astronomical observatory.

== Early life ==
Yazev was born in Tatarsk, then a part of the Russian Empire, on 28 September 1895. He was the only one of his siblings to be educated. In 1922, he graduated from Omsk State Agrarian University and began teaching geodesy there.

== Career ==
In 1926, he became an employee of the Pulkovo Observatory, moving to the Mykolaiv Observatory in 1929. In 1934, he transferred to Poltava Gravimetric Observatory, and participated in an expedition to observe the total solar eclipse on 19 June 1936 in Vengerovo.

As a professor, he taught at the universities in Novosibirsk, including at Siberian State University of Telecommunications and Informatics and the Siberian Institute of Military Transport Engineers (now Siberian State Transport University). He was one of the founders of the Siberian State University of Geodesy and Technology in 1933. He served as deputy director and head of the Department of Astronomy between 1939 and 1945. At the Siberian Institute of Military Transport Engineers, he served as head of the Department of Geodesy.

In 1948, he was accused of having been a member of the Socialist Revolutionary Party and working with local authorities during the White movement. For this, he was expelled from the All-Union Communist Party (Bolsheviks), his doctoral dissertation's defense was disapproved, he was fired from his job, and then evicted from his apartment in Novosibirsk. Despite this, he headed the astronomical observatory at Irkutsk State University. He remained director there until his death in 1955. He is buried in Lisikhinskoye Cemetery in Irkutsk.

== Family ==
Yazev had two children, both of whom he named after stars: Arktur (after Arcturus, the brightest star in Boötes) and Gemma (after Gemma, the brightest star in Corona Borealis). Arktur (1930–2010) became an astronomer, working for both Irkutsk State University and the East Siberian branch of the All-Russian Scientific Research Institute for Physical-Engineering and Radiotechnical Metrology. Arktur's wife, Kira Sergeevna Mansurova, was a notable astronomer as well; she worked at the ISU observatory starting in 1957 and served as its director between 1972 and 1988. The Mansurova asteroid is named in her honor. They had a son, Sergei (b. 1958), who headed the ISU observatory.
