= Aleksandr Gavrilov =

Aleksandr Gavrilov (also Alexander) may refer to:

- Alexander Gavrilov (figure skater) (born 1943), Soviet figure skater
- Alexander F. Gavrilov (born 1970), Russian literary critic and editor
- Aleksandr Gavrilov (revolutionary) (1891-1919), Russian revolutionary, Bolshevik
