= Vasily Gavrilov (revolutionary) =

Russian Bolshevik revolutionary (1884-1919)

Gavrilov Vasili Ivanovich
- Василий Иванович Гаврилов
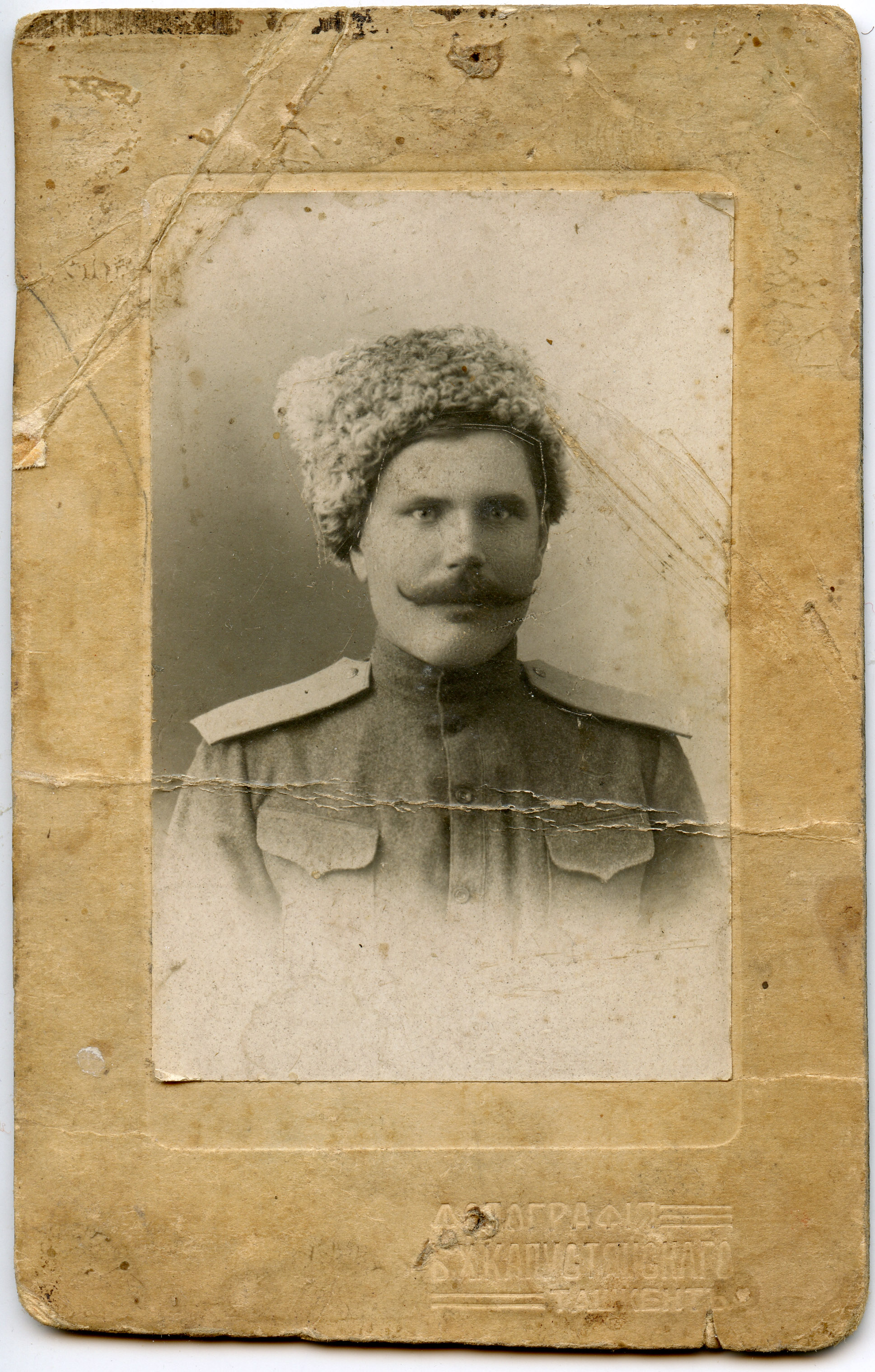

Personal details
- Born: Novy Tartas, Kainsky district, Tomsk region, Russian Empire
- Died: 22 November 1919
- Spouse: Anna Abramovna Gavrilova (5 Nov 1880—?)
- Children: Klavdia, Vasily
- Occupation: Peasant, revolutionary

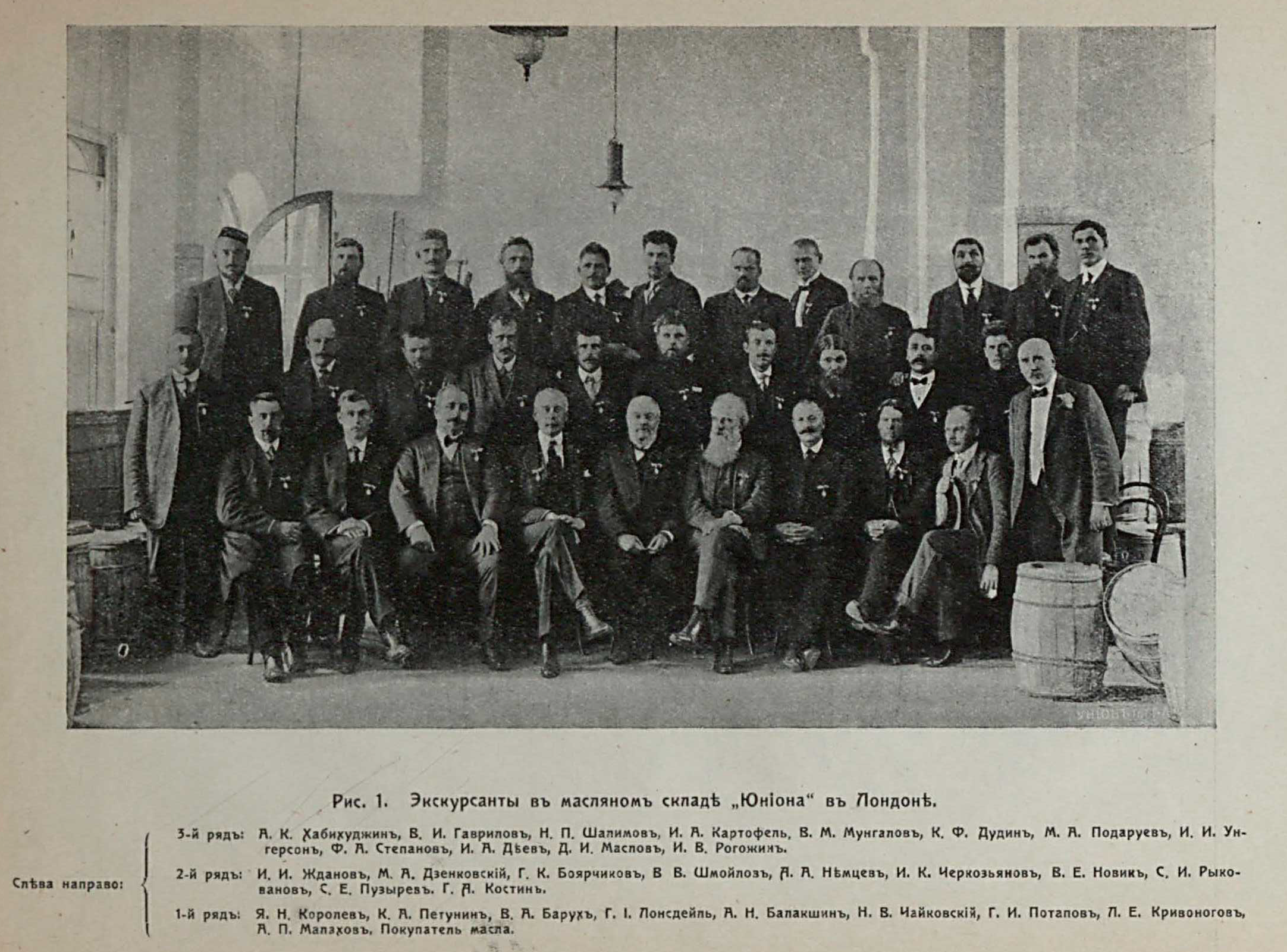
Russian merchants in the ‘Union’ oil warehouse in London, 1914. Second in the top row on the left is V.I. Gavrilov, fifth in the bottom row – A. N. Balakshin.

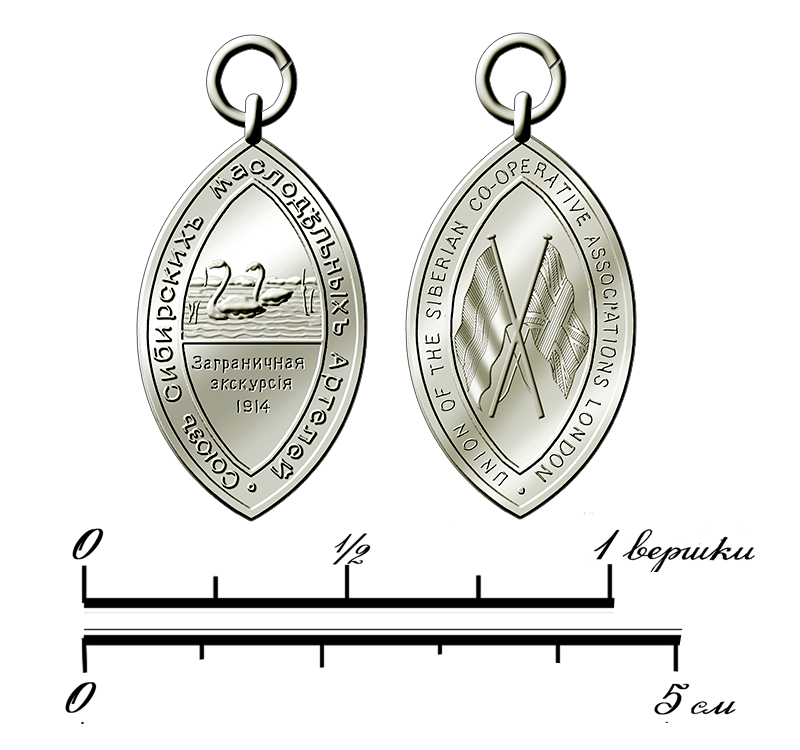
Token of a foreign excursion in 1914 of the Union of Siberian butter-making artels. Reconstruction based on the original token by V.I. Gavrilov from the collection of the Novosibirsk State Local Lore Museum.

Vasily Ivanovich Gavrilov (Russian: Василий Иванович Гаврилов — 1884, Novy Tartas, Tomsk region — 22 November 1919, Kainsk, Tomsk region) was a Russian revolutionary, Bolshevik, participant of revolutionary events and the Civil War, brother of the revolutionary Alexander Ivanovich Gavrilov, organiser and participant in the creation of the first Sovdeps of the Ust-Tarta volost and the village of Spasskoye.

He was also delegate and member of the first Kainsk district Congress of Soviets. In June 1918 he was arrested and imprisoned in Kainsk prison. On 22 November 1919 he was executed on Savkina Griva five kilometres from Kainsk.

== Biography ==
Vasily Gavrilov was born in 1884 in the village of Novotartasskaya Ust-Tartasskaya in Kainsky district, Tomsk region, now the village of Novy Tartas – the administrative centre of Novotartasskaya village council of Vengerovsky District, Novosibirsk region. He became the second (there were two brothers and four sisters) child in a large family of an old Petersburg metal worker Ivan Stepanovich Gavrilov (1858 — 2 (15) August 1901, Novy Tartass) and Gavrilova (Tikhonova) Sekletinya Ivanovna (1865 — 2 October 1938).

Before the revolution, he managed a farm in the village of Spasskoye, Ust-Tartasskoye,|Kainsky uyezd,Tomsk region. As a commissioner of the Novo-Tartasskaya butter-making artel of the Union of Siberian Butter-Making Artels in a group of 26 people went on a tour to Denmark, England and Germany to protect the quality of Siberian butter from counterfeiting, which was sent to foreign markets. On 25 May 1914 the group left Kurgan and returned to St. Petersburg on 4 July 1914. In London with them was the representative of the SSMA, head of the joint-stock company ‘Union’ Alexander Nikolayevich Balakshin. Probably spent a meeting with emigrant Bolsheviks abroad

In 1914 he was drafted into the Russian Imperial Army in Chita. In 1917 he was demobilised from the World War I, in December–January 1918 he came home as an active Bolshevik front-line soldier.

On 22 January 1918, he took part in the First Parish Congress of Soviets of the Ust-Tartas region.

In February – in the first peasant district congress in the town of Kainsk. The Provincial Congress elected the Provincial Committee of the Soviet of Deputies (Sovdep). From the Bolsheviks it included V.I. Gavrilov. After the capture of Barabinsk station by the Chekho-Esser rebels on 26 May 1918, the garrison of the Red Army together with the party members of the district Soviet of Workers, Peasants and Soldiers Deputies retreated to the town of Kainsk. Comrade Gavrilov was arrested, as well as the chairman Moses Stanislavovich Zdvinsky and the other members of the district Soviet were also arrested.

In the Kainsky district prison he was tortured by the Kolchakov Kainsky counter-intelligence and investigative commission in front of his brother Alexander. In total there were more than five hundred prisoners. In prison Vasily Gavrilov took part in the Bolshevik underground organisation. Heavily ill, he was transferred to a secret dark solitary cell, shackled.

On 20 November 1919, due to the approach of the Red Army, evacuation of 300—350 prisoners of Kainsk district prison to Novo-Nikolayevskaya prison began. By order of Lieutenant-General V. О. Kappel, From 22 November 1919, political prisoners in batches of 54 to 90 people were shot by a punitive detachment in the Savkina Griva tract, east of the town of Kainsk, Kainsk uyezd, Tomsk region, now the tract is within the city limits of Kuibyshev, Kuibyshev district, Novosibirsk Oblast.

On 1–2 December 1919 Kainsk was liberated by armies of the Workers and Peasants Red Army. The bodies of all tortured and shot were taken to Barabinsk for burial by relatives.

Vasily, together with his brother Alexander Gavrilov, is buried in the centre of the village of Novotartasskaya, Ust-Tartasskaya, Kainsky uyezd, Tomsk region, now the village of Novy Tartas – the administrative centre of Novotartasskaya village council of Vengerovsky District, Novosibirsk Oblast.

Originally an obelisk was placed with a red star on top. In 1979, in connection with the construction of a new school, the monument was moved and rebuilt.

== Memory ==
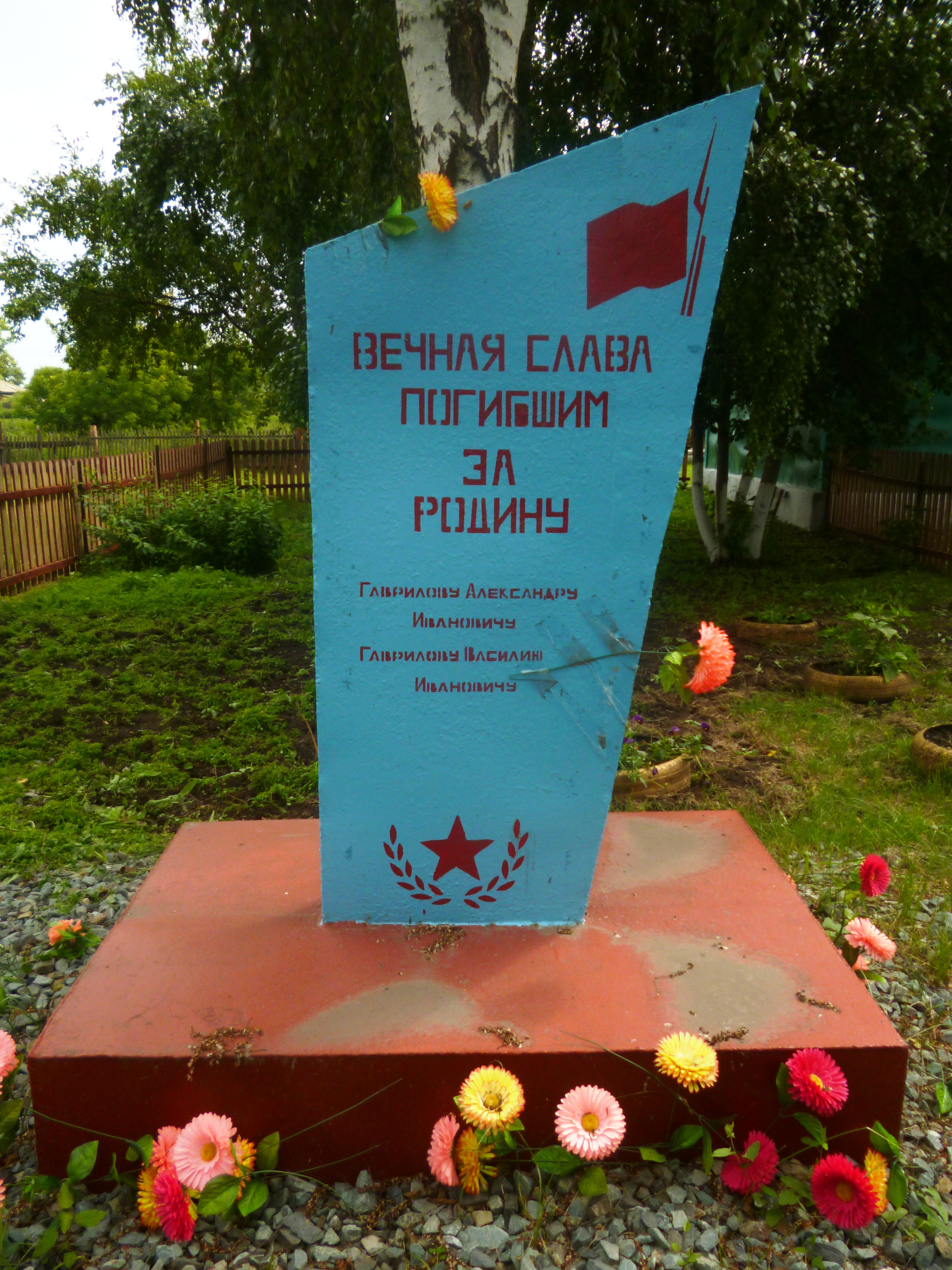
The grave of the Gavrilov revolutionary brothers in Novy Tartas. Monument placed in 1979. The first obelisk to the partisans of the Civil War with a red star was placed in the garden of the 7-year old school in the village of Novy Tartas with the inscription: ‘Alexander Ivanovich Gavrilov Vasily Ivanovich Gavrilov Red partisans brutally tortured by the Kolchakovs in November 1919’.

- The Executive Committee of the Vengerovsky District of the Novosibirsk Region of the Council of Workers' Deputies decided to name one of the streets after the «Gavrilov Brothers» in the birthplace of the Gavrilov brothers in the village of Novy Tartas.
- «The grave of revolutionary brothers Alexander and Vasily Ivanovich Gavrilov, executed by the Kolchakovs on 21–22 November 1919 in Kainsk prison» is the object of cultural heritage of regional significance No. 541410054430005., located at: Novy Tartas village, 81, Chkalova str. — 55°40′29.9″N 76°42′48.3″E

== Family ==
Wife – Gavrilova Anna Abramovna (5 November 1880-?). Two children were born – daughter Klavdia and son Vasily.

== Literature ==
Books

- Compiled, ed. [and foreword] by the tour leader N. V. Tchaikovsky, ed. (1915). The first foreign excursion of the Union of Siberian butter-making artels in 1914. Курган: Narodnaya Gazeta printing house, Union of Siberian butter making artels. p. 248.
- Тисканова Н. П. (2011). "To the 75th anniversary of the Novosibirsk Region. From the notes of a local historian (continued). Revolutionary movement (materials on the history of the native land, personal fund of P.M. Ponomarenko of Vengerovsky department of archival service)" (PDF). Novosibirsk Archive Bulletin (in Russian). Novosibirsk Region State Archive Service Department.
- Пономаренко П. М. (2005). Narodnaya Gazeta printing house, Union of Siberian butter making artels. Novosibirsk: Агро-Сибирь. p. 139.

Articles

- Баньковский В. The Gavrilov brothers' feat // Pravda newspaper. № 315(18362), 10 ноября 1968 г.
- Tiskanova, N. P. (2011). To the 75th anniversary of the Novosibirsk Region. From the notes of a local historian (continued). Revolutionary movement (materials on the history of the native land, personal fund of P.M. Ponomarenko of Vengerovsky department of archival service) (PDF) (magazine) (in Russian). Novosibirsk: Novosibirsk Region State Archive Service Department. pp. 377–419. ISBN 978-5-904795-23-8.
- Tiskanova, N. P. (June 2023). "How in London defended the honour of Siberian butter (updated and supplemented)". Vengerovskaja newspaper (newspaper) (in Russian). Vengerovo. p. 9. Archived from the original on 15 July 2023.
