= Mikhail Nikolayev =

President of the Sakha Republic (1991–2002)

- Михаил Николаев
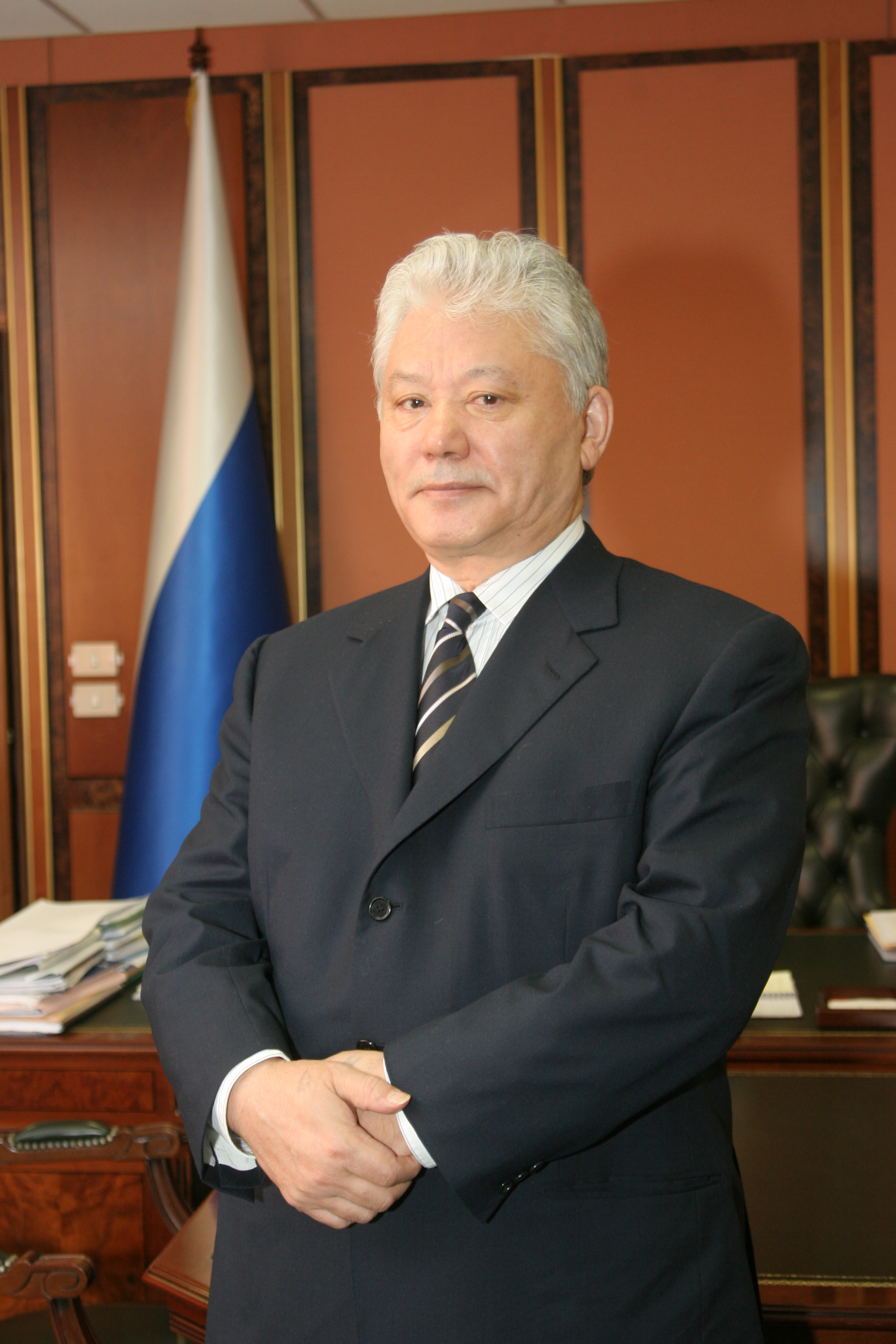
- Official portrait, 2006

Russian Federation Senator from the Republic of Sakha (Yakutia)
- In office 28 January 2002 – 23 June 2010
- Preceded by: Seat established
- Succeeded by: Vyacheslav Shtyrov

1st President of Sakha (Yakutia)
- In office 27 December 1991 – 21 January 2002
- Vice President: Vyacheslav Shtyrov (1991–97); Spartak Borisov (1997–2002)
- Preceded by: Office established
- Succeeded by: Vyacheslav Shtyrov

Personal details
- Born: 13 November 1937 Oktyomtsy, Yakut ASSR, Russian SFSR, Soviet Union (now Sakha Republic, Russia)
- Died: 4 August 2023 (aged 85) Moscow, Russia
- Resting place: Oktyomtsy
- Party: CPSU (before 1991); Sakha Omuk; United Russia
- Spouse: Dora Nikitichna Nikolayeva
- Children: 3
- Education: Omsk State Agrarian University

Mikhail Yefimovich Nikolayev (Russian: Михаил Ефимович Николаев; 13 November 1937 – 4 August 2023) was a Russian Yakut politician who was the first President of the Sakha Republic, serving from 1991 to January 2002. He was succeeded by Vyacheslav Shtyrov.

== Early life and education ==
Mikhail Nikolayev was born in Oktyomtsy of the Ordzhonikidze district (modern Khangalassky District) of the Yakut Autonomous Soviet Socialist Republic. His parents were Yefim Fyodorovich Nikolayev and Maria Mikhaylovna Nikolayeva (maiden name — Kozlova). He graduated from the Omsk State Agrarian University in 1961.

== Career ==
Nikolayev began his career in 1961 after graduating from Omsk State Agrarian University as a veterinarian in the Zhigansky district. Then he switched to the Komsomol work: first secretary of the Zhigansky district Komsomol committee, head of the department of the Komsomol authority of the Yakutsk regional Komsomol committee, first secretary of the Yakutsk city committee of the Komsomol. He was member of the CPSU from 1963 until its ban in August 1991.

From 1969 to 1971, he studied at the Higher Party School at the Central Committee of the CPSU. From 1975 to 1979, Nikolayev was the Deputy Chairman of the Council of Ministers of YASSR. From 1979 to 1985, he served as the Minister of Agriculture of the Republic. This was the period when the republic came to the forefront of the Russian Federation in the production of agricultural products, and new and bold endeavours were undertaken in the meadow, seed production, and other areas. From 1985 to 1989 he was the Secretary of the Yakut Regional Committee of the CPSU, overseeing the issues of the agro-industrial complex.

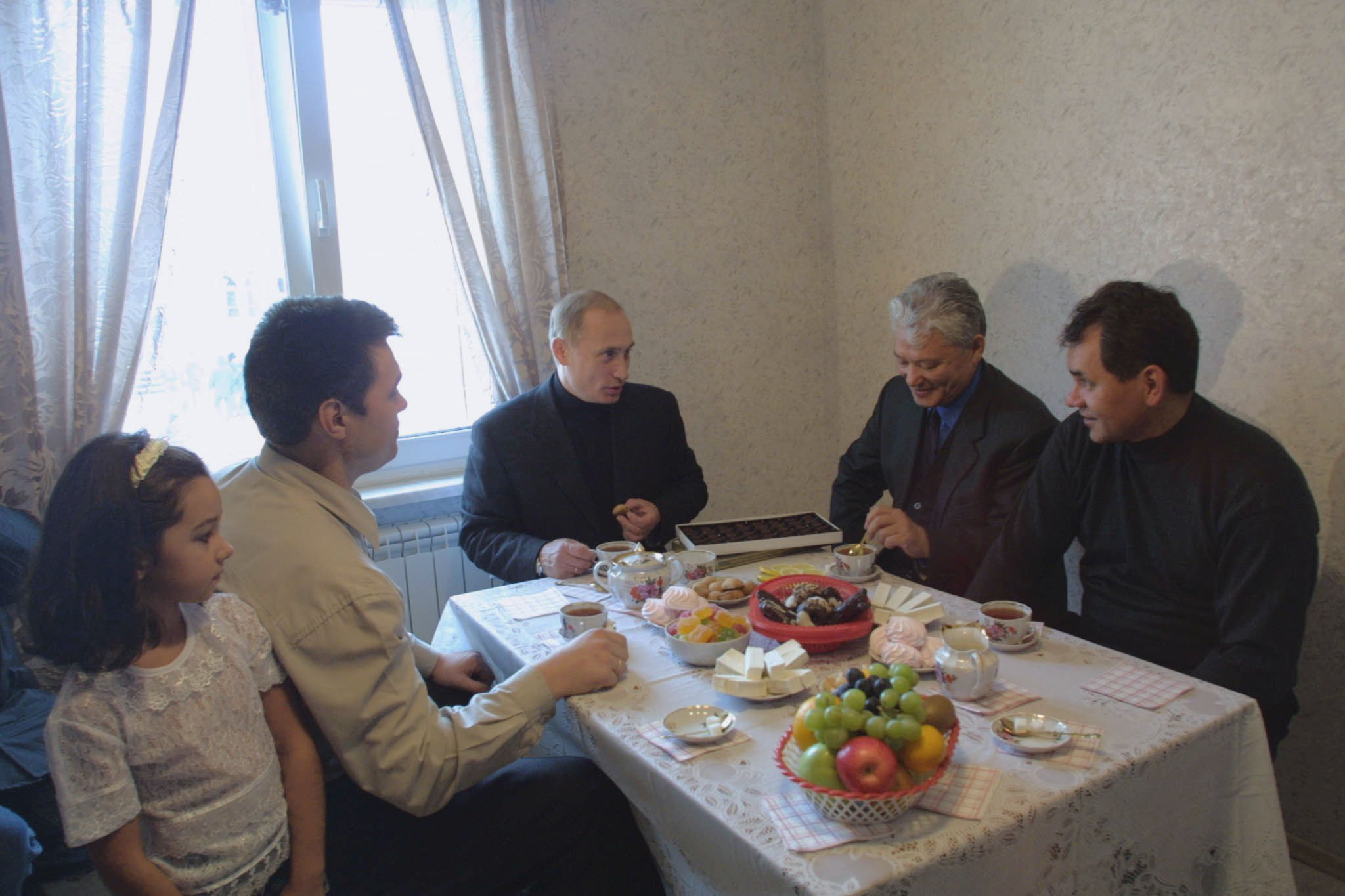
Nikolayev (2nd from right) with Vladimir Putin during the latter's visit to the Sakha Republic

In December 1989, he was elected Chairman of the Presidium of the Supreme Council of the YASSR. In April 1990, he was elected Chairman of the Supreme Council of the Republic. Deputy of the Supreme Soviet of the Yakut Autonomous Soviet Socialist Republic IX – XI convocations and people's deputy of Yakutia of the XII convocation.

On 20 December 1991, Nikolayev was elected as the inaugural President of Yakutia, receiving 76.7% of the vote. He was elected as a member of the anti-communist, Yakut nationalist Sakha Omuk party, though he later grew distant from the party and came to oppose its aims, particularly those of the radical, pro-independence faction of the party. On 16 January 1992, M.E. Nikolayev simultaneously headed the government of the republic. On 27 December 1991, the Yakut-Sakha Soviet Socialist Republic was renamed the Republic of Sakha (Yakutia). In 1996, he was re-elected for a second term, gaining 58.96% of the vote.

Nikolayev was a member of the Federation Council of the first and second convocations. On 28 January 2002, he was appointed representative in the Council of Federation of the Federal Assembly of the Russian Federation from the Government of the Republic of Sakha (Yakutia). Elected Deputy Chairman of the Federation Council. In February 2007, he was the President of the Republic of Sakha (Yakutia), V.A. Shtyrov, and was re-appointed M.E. Nikolayev as a representative of the Government of the Republic of Sakha (Yakutia) to the Council of Federation. Nikolayev was a member of the Committee of the Council of the Federation on Social Policy, member of the Commission of the Council of the Federation to monitor the activities of the Council of Federation.

In December 2011, he was elected to the State Duma of the Federal Assembly of the Russian Federation of the VI convocation from United Russia. Member of the State Duma Committee on Regional Policy and the Problems of the North and the Far East.

By decision of the Head of the Republic Egor Borisov on 31 October, Mikhail Nikolayev was appointed a State Counselor of the Republic of Sakha (Yakutia) in connection with the expiration of the powers of the deputy of the State Duma of the Federal Assembly of the Russian Federation.

Nikolayev was also the head of several public organizations. President of the International Public Movement "Eastern Dimension", President of the National Public Committee "Russian Family".

== Personal life and death ==
Nikolayev was married to Dora Nikitichna (née Sukharinova). They had three children, as well as grandchildren, great-grandchildren.

Mikhail Nikolayev died in Moscow on 4 August 2023, at the age of 85.

== Awards ==
- Order "For Merit to the Fatherland", 2nd class (2000)
- Order "For Merit to the Fatherland", 3rd class (1996)
- Order "For Merit to the Fatherland", 4th class (2008)
- Order of the Red Banner of Labour (1973)
- Order of Friendship of Peoples (1986)
- Jubilee Medal "In Commemoration of the 100th Anniversary of the Birth of Vladimir Ilyich Lenin" (1970)
- Medal "For Construction of the Baikal-Amur Railway" (1985)
- Miner's Glory Medal, 1st class (1996)

| Preceded by Office created | President of the Sakha Republic; 1991–2002 | Succeeded by Vyacheslav Shtyrov |
