= Chaim-Ber Gershonovich Chodosh =

Soviet medical scientist (1897–1995)

- Хаим-Бер Гершонович Ходос
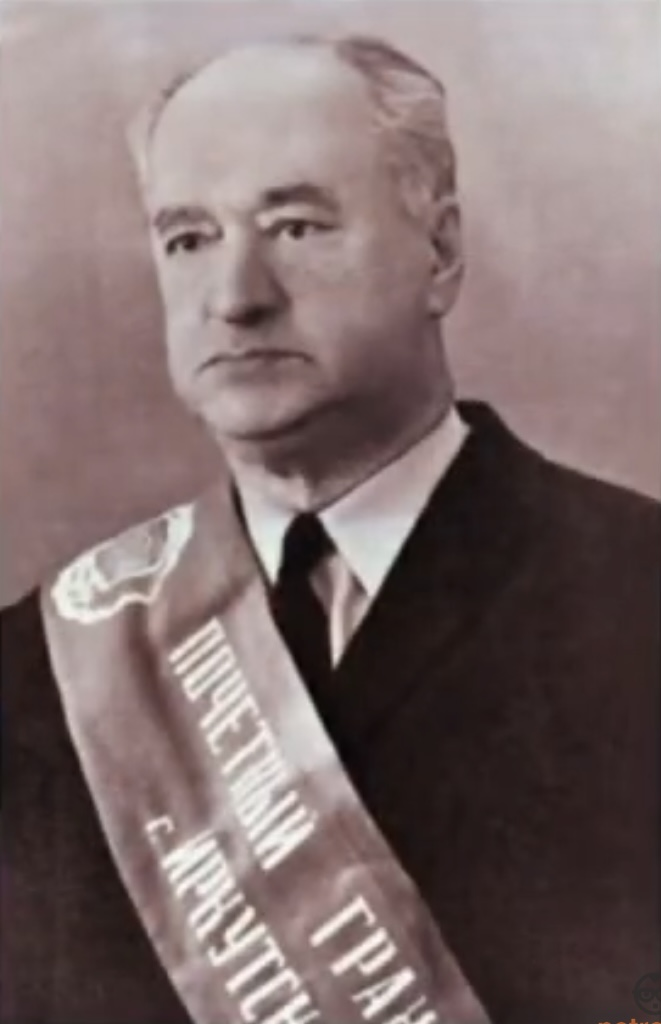
- Professor Chaim-Ber Chodosh
- Born: 24 January 1897; Kurenets, Vilna Governorate, Russian Empire
- Died: 29 April 1995 (aged 98); Irkutsk, Russia
- Education: Tomsk State University, Irkutsk State University
- Awards: Honored Scientist of the RSFSR (1967); Order of the Red Banner of Labour (2×); Order of the Badge of Honour; Medal "For the Victory over Germany"; Medal "For Valiant Labour in the Great Patriotic War"; Mongolian Order of the Polar Star; Mongolian Order of the Red Banner of Labor; Badge "Excellence in Higher Education of the USSR"; Badge "Excellence in Healthcare of the MPR"; First honorary citizen of Irkutsk (since 1917)
- Scientific career
- Fields: Neurology, Medical Science
- Workplaces: Irkutsk State Medical University

Chaim-Ber Gershonovich Chodosh (Russian: Ходос, Хаим-Бер Гершонович; 24 January 1897, Kurenets, Vilna Governorate – 29 April 1995, Irkutsk) was a Soviet medical scientist, neurologist, professor, and the author of a widely republished textbook on nervous diseases for medical universities (1948–2001). One of the first Doctors of Science in neurology in the USSR, he was the founder of the Irkutsk neurological school and a pioneer in the treatment of wartime neurological injuries.

== Biography ==
Chodosh was born in the shtetl of Kurenets (now in Vileyka District, Minsk Region) where most of the people were Lubavitcher Hasidim. His father taught Hebrew literature and his early education was in a cheder. In 1907, the family moved to Petropavlovsk, where Chodosh began his formal studies in Russian and graduated from the Realschule in 1915.

In 1916, he entered the medical faculty of Tomsk University. While a third-year student, he joined the Zionist youth organization "He-Haver" and was mobilized into the army of the Siberian Provisional Government in 1920. He served as a medical assistant at the Irkutsk Military Medical Assistant School and was assigned to the 1st Artillery Division of the 5th Red Army.

After returning briefly to Tomsk University in July 1920, Chodosh was expelled in 1922 for unspecified political reasons and transferred in 1923 to the newly established medical faculty of Irkutsk State University. He graduated in 1924 with the university’s first cohort of medical doctors. He joined the Department of Nervous Diseases at the Irkutsk Medical Institute as a resident, later becoming an assistant, associate professor, and eventually full professor and head of the department, a position he held from 1935 to 1976. In 1931, Chodosh published his first paper on the histopathology of sympathetic ganglia in acute infections, which formed the basis of his doctoral dissertation defended in 1935—making him one of the first Doctors of Science in neurology in the USSR. From 1937 to 1951, he served as the Dean of the Medical Faculty.

During the Great Patriotic War, he founded and led the Irkutsk Neuropsychiatric Center—the only one in the Soviet Union dedicated specifically to treating nerve injuries among wounded soldiers. Under his leadership, over 100,000 patients were treated, with only 3% left disabled. His 1943 monograph, Traumatic Injuries and Gunshot Wounds of the Nervous System, was considered a major contribution to military medicine. After the war, Chodosh expanded his clinic to include neurosurgical treatment, integrating it into the department’s work. He authored more than 160 scientific works, including 12 monographs and a widely used textbook on nervous diseases, republished regularly from 1948 until 2001.

Chodosh conducted pioneering studies on multiple sclerosis, identifying the near-total absence of the disease among Buryats and Mongols and concluding that ethnic and geographic factors significantly influence its etiology. He was the first to describe 12 clinical symptoms crucial for diagnosing neurological disorders.

Despite repeated offers of prestigious positions in Moscow and Leningrad, he remained in Irkutsk out of a deep personal commitment to the region and its people. He mentored generations of Siberian neurologists and led the training of more than 200 practitioners across the Irkutsk region and beyond. Under his guidance, three doctoral and 28 candidate dissertations were completed.

He also gave more than 2,000 public lectures across Siberia on topics ranging from sexual health to clinical neurology and popular science. He believed in clear, direct communication, which contributed to his popularity as a lecturer.

In 1967, Chodosh was awarded the title "Honored Scientist of the RSFSR". He became the first honorary citizen of Irkutsk since 1917, and in 1977, was elected honorary chairman of the Irkutsk Regional Scientific Society of Neurologists and Psychiatrists. He also received the badge "Excellence in Higher Education of the USSR" and was an honorary member of various neurological societies.

He lived on Marat Street in the House of Specialists, a historic building designed by architect Kazimir Mital, where a memorial plaque now commemorates him. He continued to work until age 91 and died in Irkutsk in 1995 at the age of 98. His funeral was attended by local dignitaries, professors, patients, and students. He is buried at the Novo-Lenino Cemetery.

His brothers included Isai Gershonovich Chodosh (b. 1906), a Soviet planner who was imprisoned during the Great Purge, and Mikhail Gershonovich Chodosh, a physician. His cousin was Chaim Meir Chodosh (1904–1996), a Soviet partisan during the Holocaust who immigrated to the United States.

== Honors ==
- First honorary citizen of Irkutsk since 1917.
- Honored Scientist of the RSFSR (1967)
- Order of the Red Banner of Labour (twice)
- Order of the Badge of Honour
- Medal "For the Victory over Germany in the Great Patriotic War 1941–1945"
- Medal "For Valiant Labour in the Great Patriotic War 1941–1945"
- Mongolian Order of the Polar Star
- Mongolian Order of the Red Banner of Labor
- Badge "Excellence in Higher Education of the USSR"
- Badge "Excellence in Healthcare of the MPR"

== Legacy ==
A bust of Chodosh is installed on Lenin Street near the regional geriatric center. In 2016, a city square at 20 Lenin Street was named in his honor.

His grandson, Boris Astrakhan, has led commemorative walking tours retracing the professor’s daily path to work.
