= Grigory Eliseev =

Russian journalist and editor

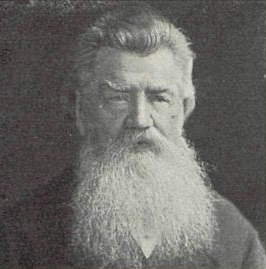
- Born: 6 February 1821; Spasskoe, Kainsk district, Tomsk Governorate, Russian Empire
- Died: 30 January 1891 (aged 69); Saint Petersburgh, Russian Empire
- Occupations: journalist, editor, publisher

Grigory Zakharovich Eliseev (Russian: Григо́рий Заха́рович Елисе́ев, 6 February (25 January) 1821, village Spasskoe, Kainsk district, Tomsk Governorate, Russian Empire – 30 (18) January 1891, Saint Petersburg, Russian Empire) was a Russian journalist, editor, and publisher.

He was best known for his work in Sovremennik magazine where, after the death of Nikolay Dobrolyubov and the arrest of Nikolay Chernyshevsky he was the leading figure in the mid-1860s. Eliseev, using numerous pseudonyms (Grytsko being the best known), headed the "Domestic affairs review" department of Sovremennik and, according to Brockhaus and Efron Encyclopedic Dictionary was later regarded as the founder of this particular reviewing genre in Russian journalism. Eliseev, a respected religious scholar, was also the author of two profound studies on the history of early Christianity in the Kazan region.
