= Sakha Omuk (1990) =

Political party in Sakha, Russia

Sakha Omuk Саха Омук
- Leader: Andrei Borisov
- President: Mikhail Nikolayev
- Founded: June 1990
- Registered: 1 July 1991
- Dissolved: 1994
- Membership: 5,000 (1991)
- Ideology: Yakut nationalism; Pan-Turkism; Anti-communism
- Political position: Big tent
- National affiliation: Democratic Party of Russia

Sakha Omuk (Yakut: Саха Омук, lit. 'Sakha people' or 'Sakha nation') was a political party active in the Yakut Autonomous Soviet Socialist Republic and the Sakha Republic during the dissolution of the Soviet Union and early post-Soviet Russia. Ideologically supportive of Yakut autonomy and nationalism, it brought about the Yakut ASSR's declaration of sovereignty during the parade of sovereignties.

== History ==
The founding congress of Sakha Omuk took place during June 1990. The president of Sakha Omuk was Andrei Borisov, a popular theatre director and a member of the Congress of People's Deputies of the Soviet Union. Sakha Omuk was named after a Yakut anti-Soviet organisation of the same name, which had existed from 1920 to 1928.

Sakha Omuk's founding came during a period of growing national consciousness among Yakuts. The de jure autonomy of the Yakut Autonomous Soviet Socialist Republic had been eroded by successive Soviet governments to the point where the region was de facto part of Russia. Further, the arrival of thousands of Slavic labour migrants to work in Yakutia's mining industry had caused a massive demographic shift, with Yakuts dropping from 90% of the population in 1920 to 33.4% by 1989. 99% of the income from these industries was taken by the central Soviet government, leaving the regional population, particularly ethnic Yakut, in destitute living conditions. As a result of these factors, popular anger at the Soviet system reached a boiling point among Yakuts in the later half of the 1980s, with riots in the regional capital of Yakutsk in 1986.

Sakha Omuk, working alongside fellow nationally minded groups Sakha Keskile and Kut-Sür, brought together intellectual voices in an effort to promote Yakut autonomy. The party found early victories in electing reform-minded deputies to various legislatures, electing Mikhail Nikolayev (de jure a member of the party, though he later had strained relations with them), and passing the Yakut declaration of sovereignty amidst the parade of sovereignties.

Following the dissolution of the Soviet Union, Sakha Omuk advocated for greater interconnectedness between the Yakut and the Turkic peoples within the Commonwealth of Independent States. On the other hand, the party, particularly members of the radical wing led by the party's vice-president Vladimir Nikolayev resisted Slavic labour migration, seeking to deny citizenship to temporary workers and promote the voluntary emigration of non-Yakut. In April 1992, the party protested against President Nikolayev, calling on him to pass the constitution, which proclaimed Yakutia as sovereign and having the right to self-determination.

Even after President Nikolayev began to distance himself from Sakha Omuk, the party continued to retain significant stature within the government, and despite its self-proclaimed status as "constructive opposition", its members held multiple ministries. It was also closely connected to the Democratic Party of Russia.

Sakha Omuk managed only a minor showing in the 1993 election to the State Assembly of the Sakha Republic, owing to waning popularity and many Yakuts' distrust for political parties after the Soviet period. The party ultimately dissolved in 1994, and its members continued to focus on strengthening Yakut influence in the region, particularly in the Assembly.

== Electoral results ==
Year	Candidate	Votes	%	Rank	Result
1991	Mikhail Nikolayev	385,000	76.6%	1st	Won
