= Aleksandr Gavrilov (revolutionary) =

- Александр Иванович Гаврилов
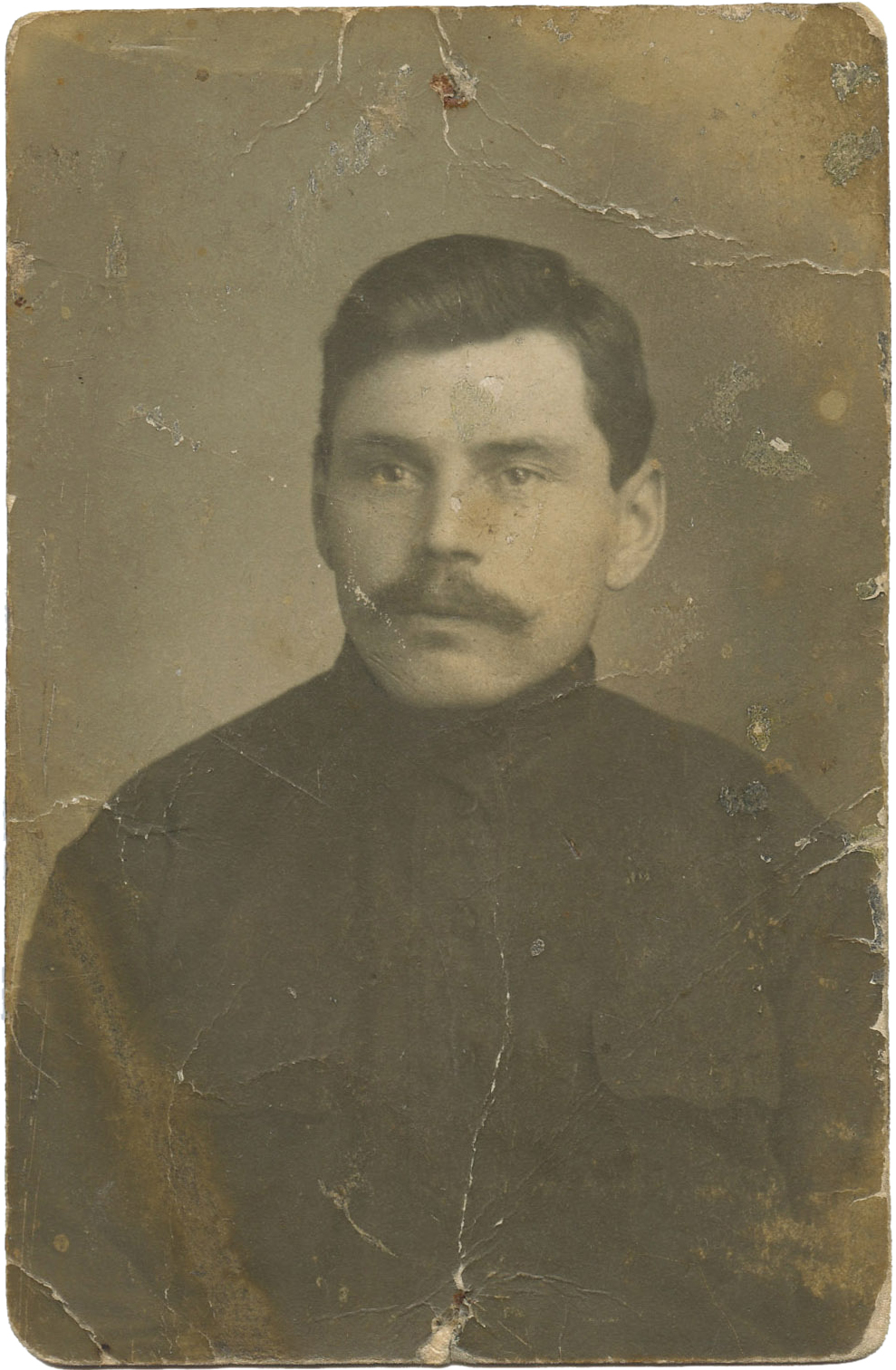

Member of the Executive Committee of the Peasants' Section of the All-Russian Central Executive Committee (VTsIK)

Personal details
- Born: 1891 Novy Tartas village, Spassky volost, Kainsky uyezd, Tomsk Governorate
- Died: 21 November 1919 (aged 27–28) Kainsk, Tomsk Governorate
- Spouse: Aleksandra Dmitrieva Gavrilova (Shashova) (1886-1925)
- Children: 3
- Occupation: revolutionary, Bolshevik

Aleksandr Gavrilov (Russian: Александр Иванович Гаврилов, tr. Aleksandr Ivanovich Gavrilov) (1891 – 21 November 1919) was a Russian revolutionary and Bolshevik who fought for Soviet rule in Siberia. He held several positions: member of the executive committee of the Peasants' Section of the All-Russian Central Executive Committee (VTsIK) of the Russian Soviet Federative Socialist Republic (RSFSR), and delegate to the 2nd All-Russian Congress of Soviets and the 4th All-Russian Extraordinary Congress of Soviets. In 1919, he and his brother Vasily were executed by the White Army under Alexander Kolchak.

== Biography ==
Aleksandr Gavrilov was born in Novy Tartas village, Kainsky uyezd, Tomsk Governorate, to merchant and old Saint Petersburg metalworker Ivan Stepanovich Gavrilov and his wife Sekletinya Ivanovna Gavrilova (Tikhonova). The family of Gavrilov's father was exiled to Siberia because of revolutionary activity.

Aleksandr attended the village school and then worked in farming.

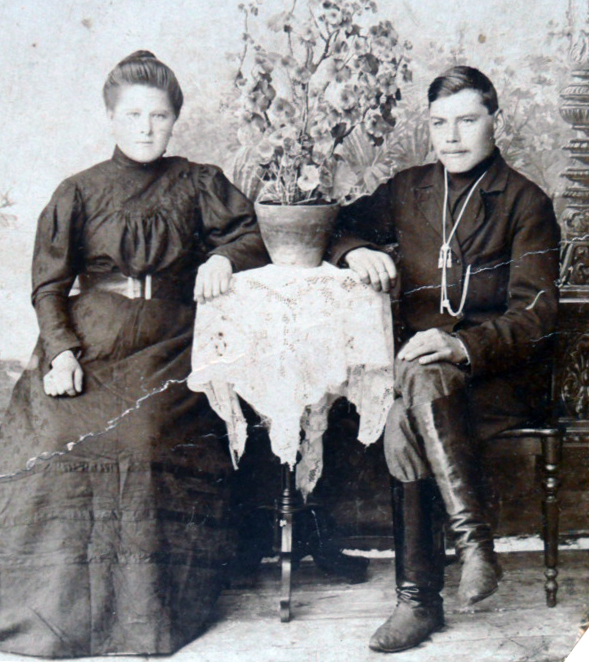
Aleskandr and Aleksandra Gavrilov, early 1900s

Aleksandr married Aleksandra Dmitrievna Gavrilova (née Shashova), and they had three children.

The Revolution of 1905 and the peasant movement of 1906 led to an influx of exiled Bolsheviks to Siberia. With their support, Marxist groups and youth institutes were created, which grew to political party organizations. In addition, there were underground organizations in the village of Spasskoe, Kainsky uyezd, Ust-Tartassk volost, Tomsk Governorate, where Gavrilov sold groceries (at a secret address) for multiple store cooperatives, which owned all the wealth of society. Gavrilov was also a student at the Blustein (Blaustein) private pharmacies.

== Political activities ==
Sometime in the early 1900s, Aleksandr and Vasily Gavrilov became active members in the underground Bolshevik movement. In 1905, the brothers moved to Spassoke Village, where they worked to spread the influence of the movement.

Starting in 1913, Gavrilov got a job working in a locksmith shop. Subsequently moving to Kainsk, he began leading propaganda campaigns for the Bolshevik revolution. Because of his activities in the oblast (region), he was suspected by the royal security forces of being a revolutionary, which forced him to move to the city of Omsk; there he found work as a locksmith for the railroad. After four years of working for the railroad, he was promoted to metalworker-gauger. Because of his underground revolutionary activities, he moved from Kainsk to Spasskoe to Tashkent, and then he found work in Ural factories. He worked several trades during this time, including locksmith, machinist (in a creamery), and farmer.

He was twice involved with investigations because of political activities; later he joined the Socialist-Revolutionary Party. He joined the 1st Volost Kainsk Soviet of Deputies and the Tomsk Governorate Congress of Soviets. On 25 March 1917, after being unanimously elected at the Congress of Volost Representatives of Kainsk uyezd, he was selected by the volost committee to represent them at the Congress of Peasant Deputies in Omsk.

The manual for organizations of Soviet authority recalled him. A delegate from the Urals at the 2nd All-Russian Congress of Soviets, he was then elected to the All-Russian Central Executive Committee.

In March 1918, he was delegated by a final vote—of the Soviet of Workers, Peasant, Military, Cossack, and Muslim Deputies of Tashkent, Sirdarya region—to the 4th Congress of Soviets in Moscow. Because of his increasing political authority, on 15 April 1918, he joined the executive committee of the Peasant Section of the All-Russian Central Executive Committee. Other delegates included P.A. Kudryavtsev, who represented the Tashkent Oblast Soviet (Syrdarya region), and Zharkov, who was the chairman of the Turkestan Soviet Committee.

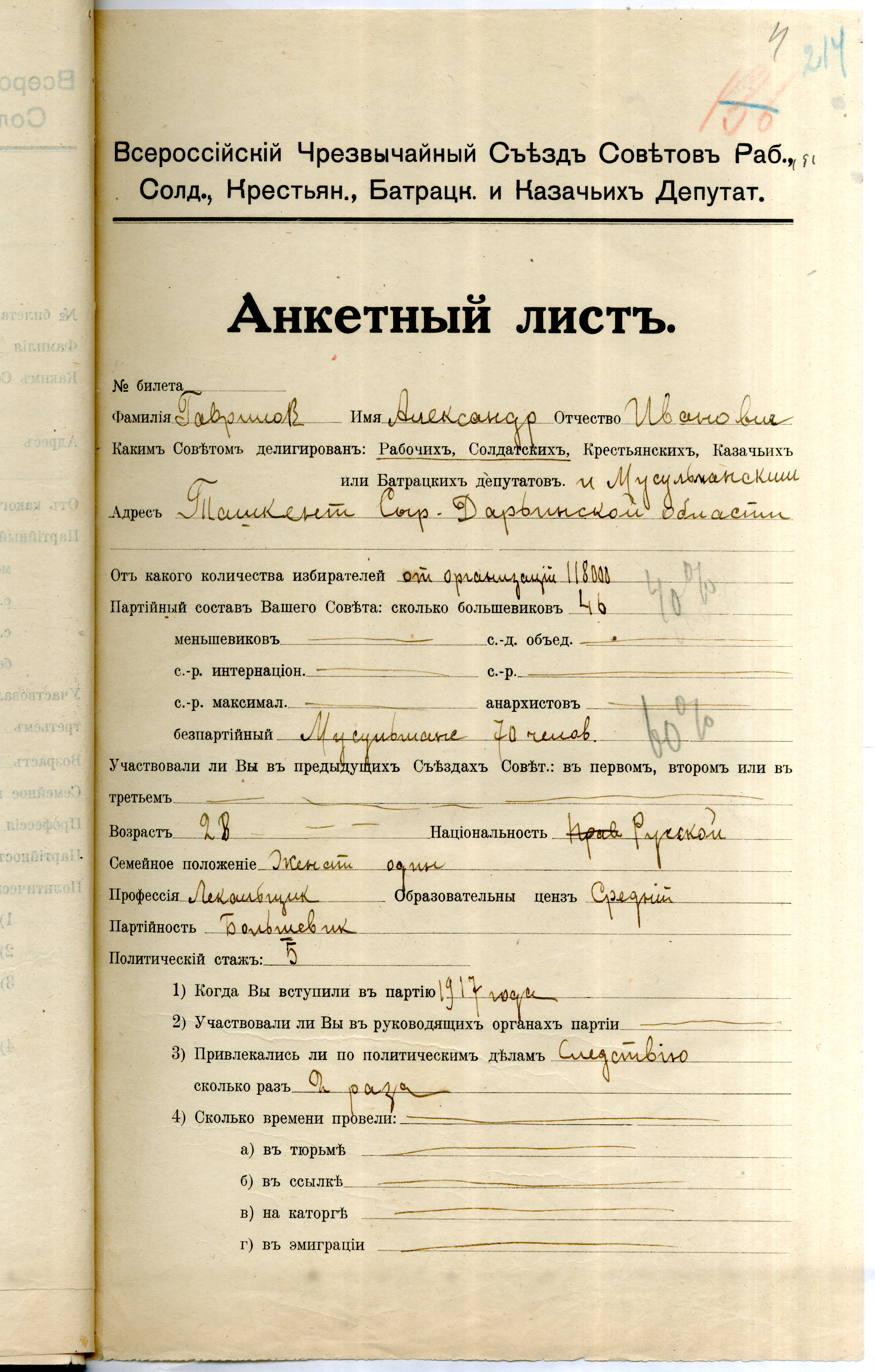
Delegate Questionnaire for the 4th All-Russian Congress of Soviets

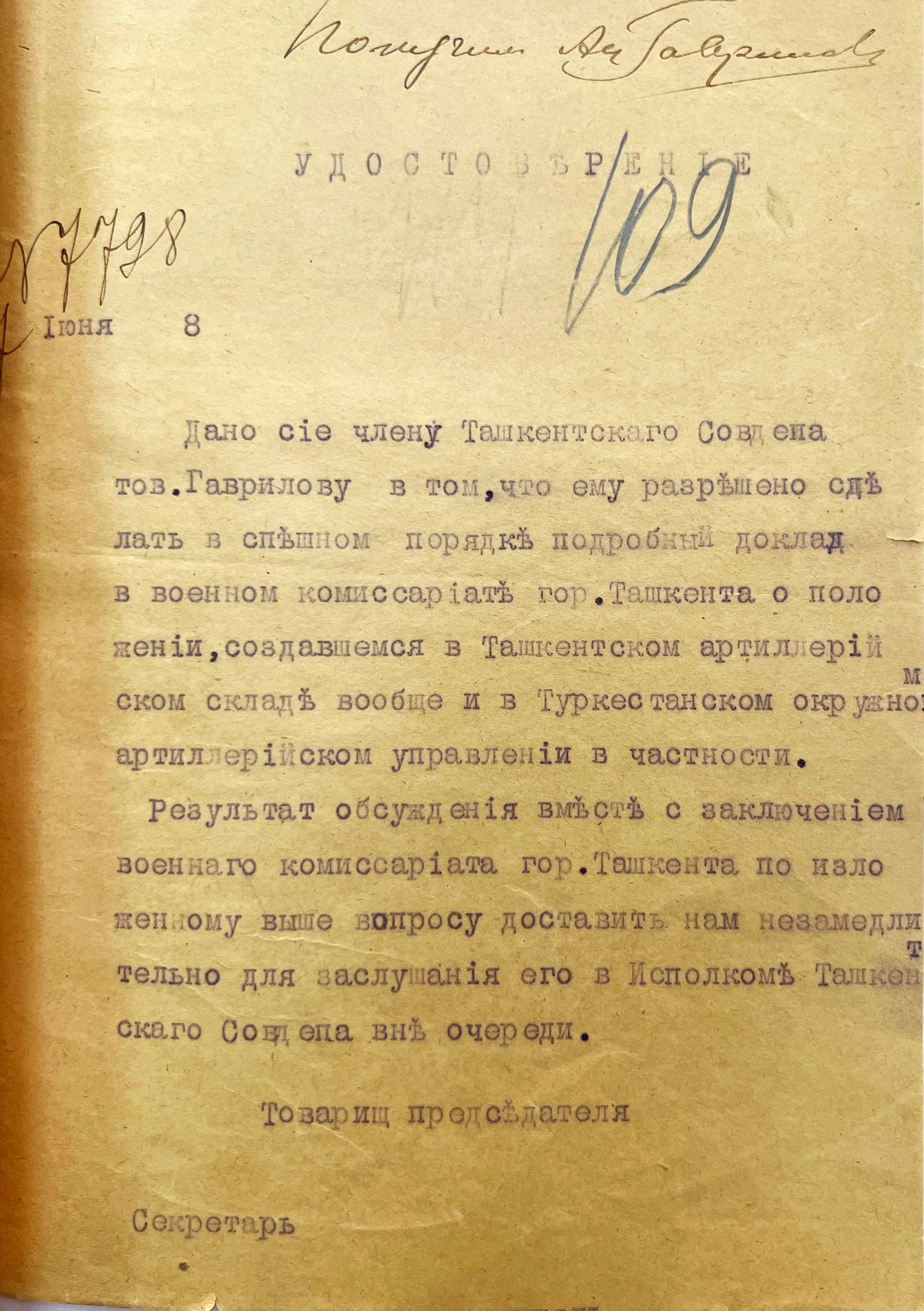
Certificate of Report on the Turkestan District Artillery Administration

At the 5th All-Russian Congress of Soviets (6–10 July 1918), Gavrilov was elected a member of the All-Russian Central Executive Committee (VTsIK) of the RSFSR.

After meeting with Vladimir Lenin, Gavrilov—as a member of the peasant section of the VTsI—was sent to Irkutsk to participate in underground spying against Kolchak's reactionary dictatorship. The Revolutionary Government sent him to Omsk to establish a Soviet deputation. In late 1918, he traveled to Manchuria and then returned to Irkutsk, where he was arrested by Kolchak's counterintelligence service.

In a 1969 letter, Gavrilov's younger sister wrote:

While hiding in Irkutsk, his passport listed him as Alexander Ivanovich Fedotov.

— Taisia Ivanovna Selezneva (Gavrilova)

Gavrilov was transported to Kainsk on 26 (?) June 1919, an hour before the planned uprising. After this uprising failed on 24 June, he suffered a severe head wound and was placed into solitary confinement. While in confinement, he was starved, shackled, and denied water. On 21 November 1919, he was taken out among 13 other political prisoners for execution on the banks of the Om River. Instead of facing a firing squad, they were brought before local villagers, hacked to death with sabers, and then thrown into a hole in the river's ice. On 1 December 1919, Kainsk was taken by the Red Army; the bodies of the victims were recovered and buried with military honors. Gavrilov lies with the other prisoners who were executed in the village of Novy Tartas.

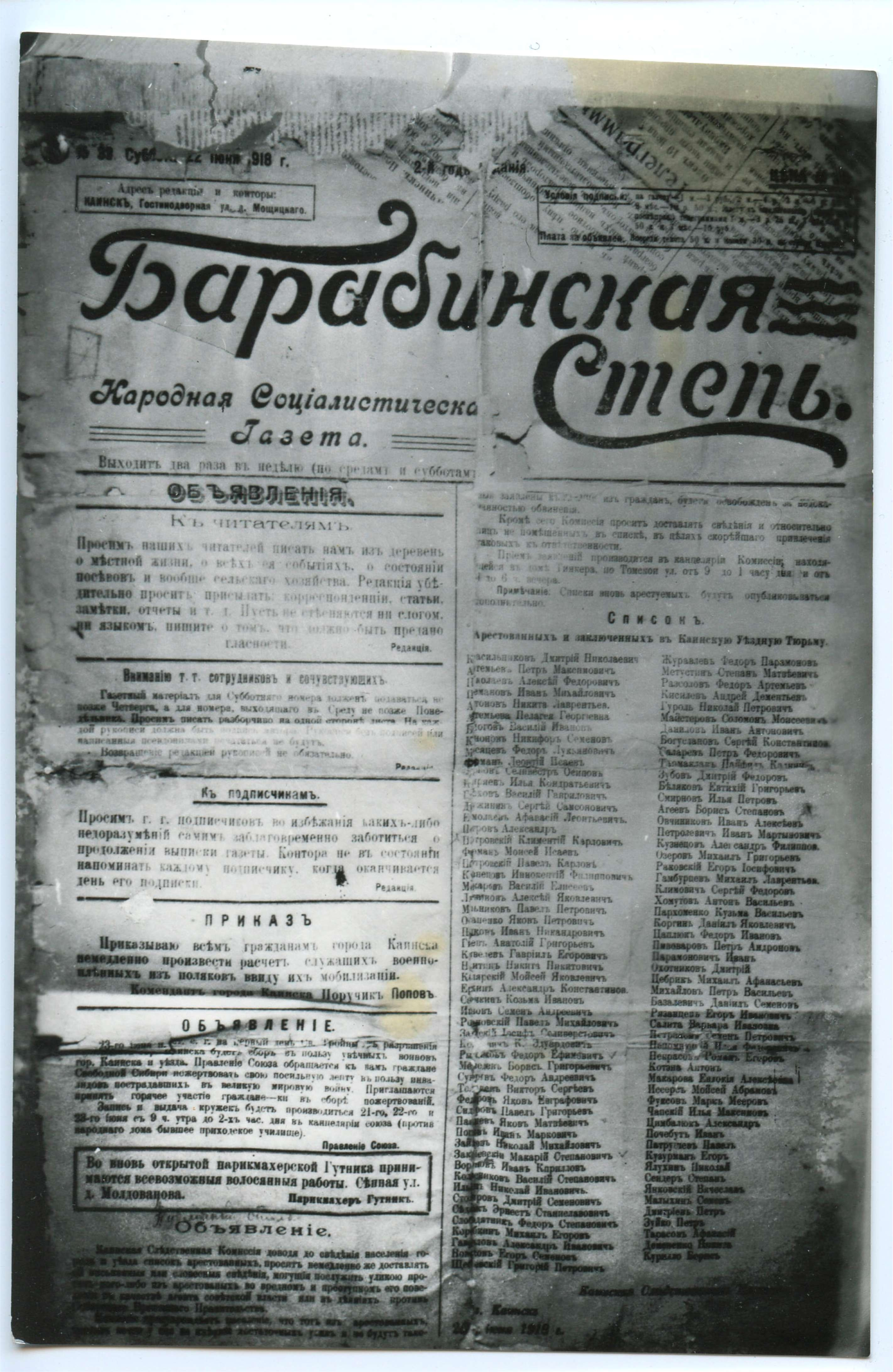
List of people arrested and imprisoned in the Kainsk County Prison, published in the newspaper Barabinskaya Step No. 33, Saturday, 22 June 1918. Second Year of Publication. Narodnaya Sotsialisticheskaya Gazeta

Notice. The Kainsk Investigative Commission, bringing to the attention of the town and district population the list of those arrested, requests that you immediately provide written or verbal information that may serve as evidence against any of those arrested for harmful and criminal behavior as an agent of the Soviet government or actions against the Siberian Provisional Government.

The Commission warns the population that any of those arrested against whom there is insufficient evidence, and for whom no such evidence is presented by any citizen, will be released due to insufficient evidence of guilt.

Furthermore, the Commission requests that information be provided regarding individuals not included in the list, in order to bring them to justice as quickly as possible.

Applications are accepted at the Commission's office... Note: Lists of newly arrested individuals will be published additionally.

List of arrested and imprisoned in the Kainsk County Prison:

- Dmitry Nikolaevich Krasilnikov
- Pyotr Maksimovich Artemyev
- Aleksey Fyodorovich Nikolaev
- Ivan Mikhailovich Shemanov
- Nikita Lavrentyev Antonov
- Pelageya Georgievna Artemyeva
- Vasily Ivanovich Bologov
- Nikifor Semenov Kononov
- Fyodor Lukyanovich Mesyatsev
- Leonty Isaev Furman
- Selivester Osipov Chernov
- Ilya Kondratievich Shiryaev
- Vasily Gavrilovich Glukhov
- Sergey Samsonovich Druzhinin
- Afanasy Leontyevich Ermolaev
- Aleksander Petrov
- Klimentiy Karlovich Petrovsky
- Moisey Isaevich Furman
- Pavel Karlovich Petrovsky
- Innokenty Filippovich Kuznetsov
- Vasily Eliseev Makarov
- Aleksey Yakovlevich Litvinov
- Pavel Petrovich Melnikov
- Yakov Petrovich Ostapenko
- Ivan Nikandrovich Popokov
- Anatoly Grigoriev Gilev
- Gavriil Yegorovich Krivelev
- Nikita Nikitovich Nikitin
- Moisey Yakovlevich Kotlyarsky
- Aleksander Konstantinov Yeryokhin
- Kuzma Ivanov Savechkin
- Semen Andreevich Ivanov
- Pavel Mikhailovich Romanovsky
- Iosif Seliverstovich Zavadsky
- K. Eduardovich Kononovich
- Fyodor Yefimovich Ryzhankov
- Boris Grigoryevich Medvedev
- Fyodor Andreevich Suvorov
- Viktor Sergeevich Tolkachev
- Yakov Evgrafovich Fyodorov
- Pavel Grigoryev Sidorov
- Yakov Matveevich Papshev
- Ivan Markovich Popov
- Nikolai Mikhailovich Zaytsev
- Makary Stepanovich Zakriyevsky
- Ivan Kirillov Voronov
- Vasily Stepanovich Kolesnikov
- Nikolai Ivanovich Ilyin
- Dmitry Semenovich Stolyarov
- Ernest Stanislavovich Sedlak
- Fyodor Stepanovich Slobodyatnik
- Mikhail Yegorov Korobkin
- Aleksander Ivanovich Gavrilov
- Yegor Semenov Novikov
- Grigory Petrovich Shcheblevsky
- Fyodor Paramonov Zhuravlyov
- Stepan Matveevich Metustin
- Fyodor Artemyev Razsolov
- Andrey Demeniev Kisilev
- Nikolay Petrovich Gurol
- Solomon Moiseevich Mayesterov
- Ivan Antonovich Danilov
- Sergey Konstantinovich Boguslanov
- Pyotr Fyodorovich Salarev
- Payfil Kalinik Tarmaklak
- Dmitry Fyodorov Zubov
- Evtikhiy Grigoryev Belyakov
- Ilya Petrov Smirnov
- Boris Stepanov Ageev
- Ivan Alekseev Ovchinnikov
- Ivan Martynovich Petrolevich
- Aleksander Filippovich Kuznetsov
- Mikhail Grigoryev Ozerov
- Yegor Iosifovich Rakovsky
- Mikhail Lavrentyev Gamburtsev
- Sergey Fyodorov Klimovich
- Anton Vasilyev Khomutov
- Kuzma Vasilyev Parkhomenko
- Daniil Yakovlevich Korogine
- Fyodor Ivanov Tsaplyuk
- Pyotr Andronov Pivovarov
- Ivan Paramonovich
- Dmitry Okhotnikov
- Mikhail Afanasyev Tsebrik
- Pyotr Vasilyev Mikhailov
- Daniil Semenov Bazalevich
- Yegor Ivanovich Ryazantsev
- Varvara Ivanovna Salita
- Semen Petrovich Petrakov
- Ilya Fyodorovich Nepomnyashchy
- Roman Yegorov Nekrasov
- Anton Kotena
- Evdokia Alekseevna Makarova
- Moisey Abramov Issers
- Mark Meerov Fuksov
- Ilya Maksimov Chapsky
- Aleksander Tsymbalyuk
- Ivan Pochebut
- Pavel Patrushev
- Yegor Kuzurman
- Nikolai Yalukhin
- Stepan Sender
- Vyacheslav Yankovsky
- Semen Malykhin
- Pyotr Dmitriev
- Pyotr Zuiko
- Afanasy Tarasov
- Nikita Demenenko
- Boris Kurillo

Kainsk Investigative Commission. Kainsk, June 20, 1918.

– «Barabinskaya Step» newspaper, No. 33, Saturday, June 22, 1918.

Also mentioned among those imprisoned in the Kolchak prison in Kainsk were: Aleksandrov-Beilin, Akhmadzyan, Baibakov, Baranov, V. Berman, K. Bochkarov, Valyaev, Varlakov, Veleur, Vershinin, L. Vozdzvizhensky, N. Voronov, Garaskin, N.S. Dmitriyev, Dulka, Elistaratov, Ivan Grigoryevich Ermakov, Zdvinsky, P. Zonov, Ivanov, Ionov, F.I. Karpunin, Kondratyev, Kopeikin, Krivenko, I. Larionov, Lysak, Makarov, Manuilenko, N.I. Maslov, Mikhalevich, Moroz, Mukhlin, N. Noskov, Orlov, Pechinkin, G.A. Pokrovsky, Posredinov, Pushkarev, Rubanovich, Rylyeyev, Sokolov, Stafiyevsky, [M.M.] Surkov, S. Sukhodolov, Khrenov, Tsukanov, A. Tsymbalyuk, Chebykin, I. Chepkov, Chernov, Chyornyy, Shimanovich, V.I. Shkil, Shmakov, Yakobson.

List of prisoners from the Kainsk Prison who escaped on June 24, 1919. Political Prisoners:

- Nikifor Maslov – killed
- Nikolai Noskov – killed
- Prokopy Ulyantsev – detained
- Emelian Shkil – detained
- Grigory Rakovsky – detained
- Fyodor Sokolov – detained
- Sergey Druzhinin – detained
- Aleksander Gavrilov – detained
- Evtikhiy Belyakov – detained
- Vitaly Pishalnikov – not found

Total: killed – 2, detained – 7, not found – 1.

— «Barabinskaya Step» newspaper, No. 162, Thursday, 3 July 1919, 3rd year of publication. – P. 2.

== Memorial ==
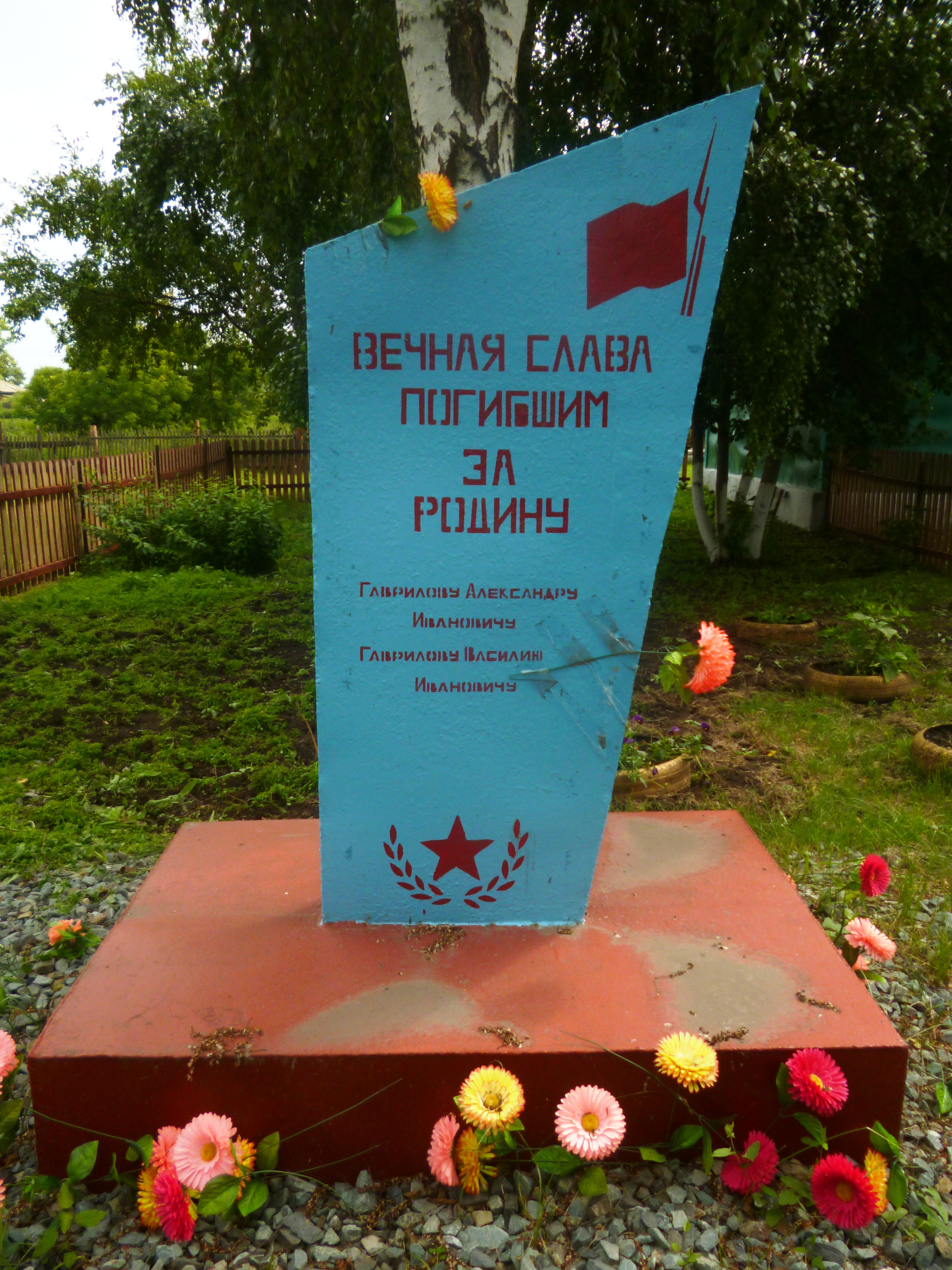
A new memorial for the Gavrilov Brothers in the village of Novy Tartas

In 1953, an obelisk—with the inscription "Aleksandr Ivanovich Gavrilov and Vasily Ivanovich Gavrilov, Red Partisans, brutally tortured to death by Kolchakists in November 1919"—was erected in Aleksandr and Vasily Gavrilov's home village, in the garden of the 8(7)-year School, Novy Tartas. In 1979, the memorial was moved and reconstructed during the rebuilding of a new school in the center of the village.

In the brothers Gavrilov's home village of Novy Tartas, the executive committee of the Vengerovsky District Soviet of Workers' Deputies named a street "Gavrilov Brothers".
