= Mark Sergeev =

- Сергеев Марк Давидович
- Born: Mark Davidovich Gantvarger; May 11, 1926; Enakievo, Artyomovsky District, Ukrainian SSR, USSR
- Died: June 9, 1997 (aged 71); Irkutsk, Russia
- Occupations: Prose writer, poet, bibliophile, editor

Mark Sergeev (1926–1997) (Russian: Марк Сергеев) was a Russian poet. Sergeev is known by his books Rail Tracks, A Ballad About Poplars, Carving, Connection of Times, and Evening Birds. He has published about 20 poem collections.

Sergeev's first book was a collection of poems for children. About 60 children's books of his were published.

== Early life ==
He was born in the family of a builder, later the head of a comprehensive survey party to check the Padunsky narrowing on the Angara River. His parents were David Markovich Gantvarger and Rosalia Gantvarger. On the maternal side, he was the great-grandson of the classic of Jewish literature, Mendele Mocher Sforim.

He fought in the Great Patriotic War as a major. Before graduation in June 1941, Sergeyev's entire class planted a poplar alley in front of the school. All the graduates vowed to return, but only five kept their vows – the rest died in the war. The poem "The Ballad of Poplars" is dedicated to these events.

He graduated from the Faculty of History and Philology of Irkutsk University.

In 1979, he joined the editorial boards of the book series Literary Monuments of Siberia" and Polar Star of the East Siberian Book Publishing House (Irkutsk).

In 1994, he initiated the creation of the All-Russian Festival "Days of Russian Spirituality and Culture" Radiance of Russia(Irkutsk).

He was buried in Irkutsk Radishchevsky cemetery.

== Recognition ==
- Order of the Patriotic War II degree (1985).
- Order of the Badge of Honor.
- Order of Friendship of Peoples.
- Laureate of the Irkutsk Komsomol Prize.(1971)
- Laureate of the Prize of the Culture and Art Development Fund under the Committee of Culture of the Irkutsk Region (1996)

== Legacy ==
- The Irkutsk Regional Children's Library bears his name.
- The Irkutsk House of Writers bears his name.
- On the house where Mark Sergeev lived, a memorial plaque was erected in memory of him.
- In Irkutsk, the "Intellectual of the Province" award named after Mark Sergeev was established.
