= Medal "For Construction of the Baikal-Amur Railway" =

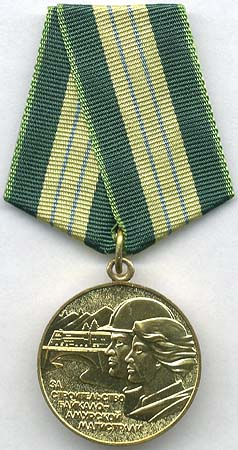
- Medal "For Construction of the Baikal-Amur Railway" (obverse)
- Type: Civilian medal
- Awarded for: Three years of dedicated work in the construction of the Baikal-Amur Railway
- Presented by: USSR
- Eligibility: Soviet citizens
- Status: No longer awarded
- Established: October 8, 1976

Highlights
- Total: 170,030
- Ribbon of the Medal "For Construction of the Baikal-Amur Railway"

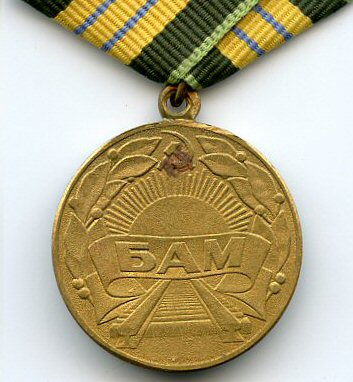
Reverse of the Medal "For Construction of the Baikal-Amur Railway"

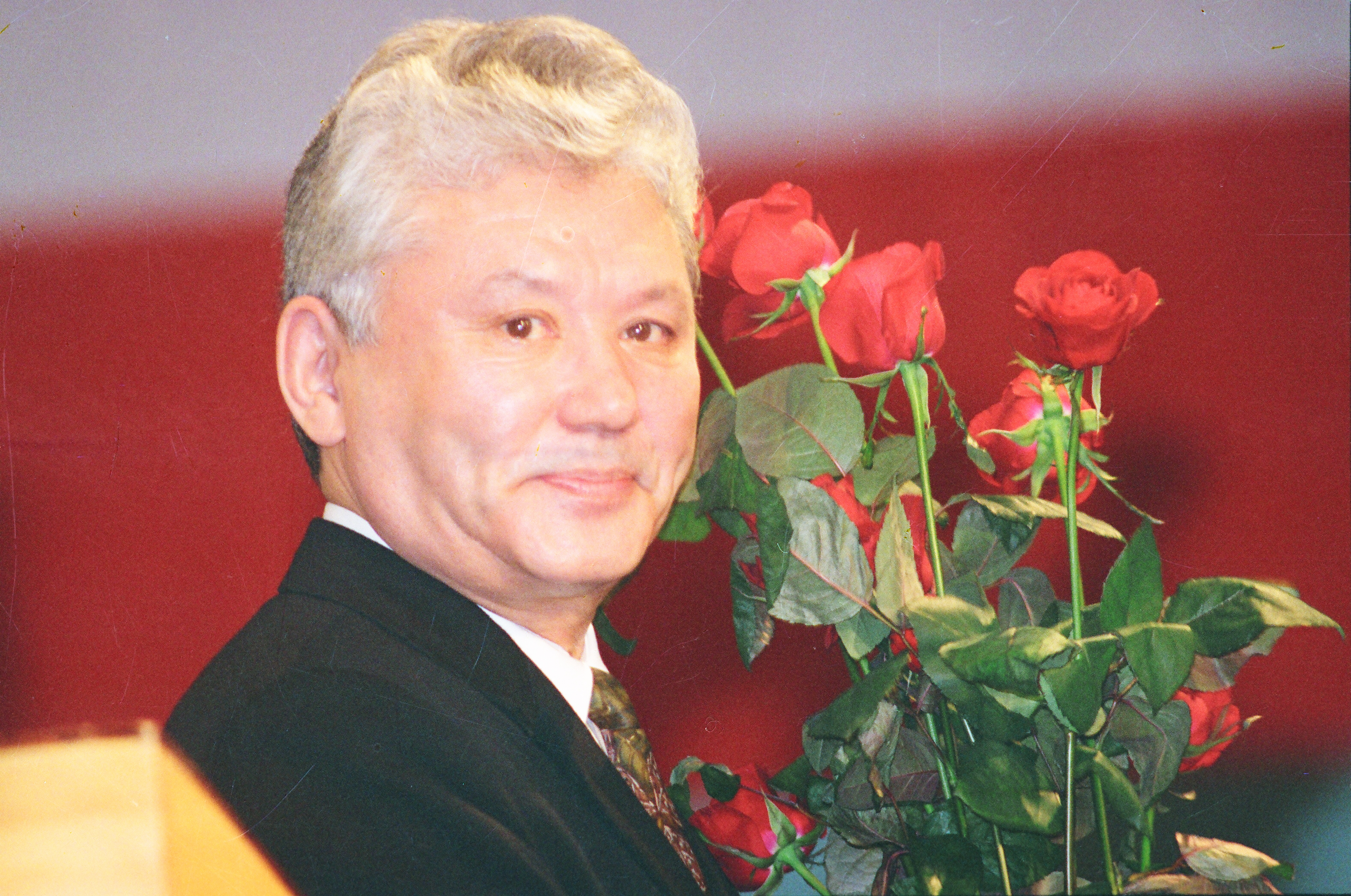
1st President of the Republic of Sakha, Mikhail Nikolayev, a recipient of the Medal "For Construction of the Baikal-Amur Railway"

The Medal "For Construction of the Baikal-Amur Railway" (Russian: Медаль «За строительство Байкало-Амурской магистрали») was a civilian award of the Soviet Union established on October 8, 1976, by Decree of the Presidium of the Supreme Soviet of the USSR to recognise active participation in the construction of the Baikal-Amur Railway, a huge multi year project under the leadership of then Soviet general secretary Leonid Brezhnev. The medal's statute was amended on July 18, 1980, by decree of the Presidium of the Supreme Soviet of the USSR No. 2523-X.

== Medal statute ==
The Medal "For Construction of the Baikal-Amur Railway" was awarded to active participants in the construction of the Baikal-Amur Railway, on the rail section Bam – Tynda – Berkakit, on the second rail section Taishet – Lena, in the production facilities, in the building of housing for the civilian workers, for good work in construction, for high-quality designs and survey work, for honest work at enterprises, institutions and organizations directly supporting the construction efforts and the workers. The medal was usually awarded to workers, engineering-technical workers and employees who worked on the project in its construction, design or for its maintenance for at least three years.

Recommendations for award of the Medal "For construction of the Baikal-Amur Railway" were made by the Party administration, trade union and Komsomol organizations, enterprises, institutions and organizations, and sent to the Ministry of Transport Construction of the USSR for review. The names of the recipients was then forwarded to the executive committees of the Amur Oblast, Irkutsk Oblast, Chita Oblast, Khabarovsk Regional Council of People's Deputies and to the Supreme Soviet Presidium of the Buryat and Yakut Autonomous Soviet Socialist Republics, which, after final consideration, awarded the medal on behalf of the Presidium of the Supreme Soviet of the RSFSR in the communities of the recipients.

The Medal "For construction of the Baikal-Amur Railway" was worn on the left side of the chest and in the presence of other medals of the USSR, immediately after the Medal "For the Development of Virgin Lands". If worn in the presence of awards of the Russian Federation, the latter have precedence.

Each medal came with an attestation of award, this attestation came in the form of a small 8 cm by 11 cm cardboard booklet bearing the award's name, the recipient's particulars and an official stamp and signature on the inside. Following the death of the recipient, the medal and attestation of award certificate remained with the family as a memento.

== Medal description ==
The Medal "For Construction of the Baikal-Amur Railway" was a 32 mm in diameter brass circular medal with a raised rim. On its obverse, in the background in the left half of the medal, the relief image of hills and a train going left across a bridge over a river, under the bridge, the relief inscription on five lines "For the construction of the Baikal-Amur Railway" (Rusyn: «За строительство Байкало-Амурской магистрали»), in the right half of the medal, the left profiles of a man and a woman, the man wearing a construction helmet, the woman being closer and slightly to the right. On the reverse, the Sun over railroad tracks intersected by a ribbon bearing the inscription "BAM" (Russian: «БАМ») framed by a laurel wreath with the hammer and sickle at the top.

The medal was secured to a standard Soviet pentagonal mount by a ring through the medal suspension loop. The mount was covered by a 24 mm wide overlapping silk moiré ribbon with 1 mm wide light green edge stripes, three 3 mm wide central yellow stripes separated by two 0,5 mm grey stripes, bordered by two 6 mm wide dark green stripes.

== Recipients (partial list) ==
The individuals below were recipients of the Medal "For Construction of the Baikal-Amur Railway".

- Mikhail Yefimovich Nikolayev
- Alexey Vasiliyevich Gordeyev
- Valentin Vitalyevich Lebedev
- Abdul-Vahed Niyazov
- Dmitry Fyodorovich Mezentsev
- Rimma Fyodorovna Kazakova
- Vyacheslav Stepanovich Ikonnikov
- Vladimir Nikolaevich Suprun
- Salman Magomedrasulovich Babaev
- Nikolai Alekseevich Sorokin
- Victor Efimovich Biryukov
- Vladimir Yemelianovich Gritsishin
- Vladislav Vladimirovich Nikolaev
- Ivan Konstantinovich Sahinidi
- Vyacheslav Grigor'evich Kubarev
- Kim Ivanovich Bazarsadaev,
- Fedor Petrovich Krendelev

== See also ==
- Baikal-Amur Mainline
- Orders, decorations, and medals of the Soviet Union
