= Rimma Kazakova =

Russian poet (1932–2008)

- Born: Rimma Fyodorovna Kazakova; 27 January 1932; Sevastopol, Crimean ASSR, Soviet Union
- Died: 19 May 2008 (aged 76); Yudino, Odintsovsky District, Russia
- Resting place: Vagankovo Cemetery
- Education: Leningrad State University
- Occupations: Poet, television presenter, singer

Rimma Fyodorovna Kazakova (Russian: Ри́мма Фёдоровна Казако́ва; 27 January 1932 – 19 May 2008) was a Soviet and Russian poet and translator. She was known for writing many popular songs of the Soviet era.

== Biography ==
Kazakova was born in Sevastopol, Soviet Union. She graduated from the history department of Leningrad State University. She worked as a lecturer in Khabarovsk.

Her first rhymes were reminiscent of Yevtushenko, Okudzhava, Voznesensky and Rozhdestvensky and were first published in 1955. Her first poetry collection, Let's Meet in the East (Russian: Встретимся на Востоке), was published in 1958.

From 1959 until her death, she was a member of the Union of Soviet Writers. She also held the position of First Secretary of the Moscow Union of Writers.

In October 1993, she signed the Letter of Forty-Two.

She died at age 76 at a medical sanatorium in Yudino village of Moscow Oblast, Russia, on 19 May 2008. She was buried on 22 May 2008 at Vagankovo Cemetery in Moscow.

== Notable works ==
- There, Where You Are
- Verses
- Fridays
- In Taiga Nobody Cries
- Fir-trees Green
- Snow Babe
- I Remember
- On White
- Country named Love
- Touchstone
- Out of Mind
- Plot of Hope

== Honours and awards ==
- Order "For Merit to the Fatherland", 4th class
- Order of the Red Banner of Labour (16 November 1984)
- Order of Friendship of Peoples
- Medal "In Commemoration of the 850th Anniversary of Moscow"
- Jubilee Medal "In Commemoration of the 100th Anniversary of the Birth of Vladimir Ilyich Lenin"
- Medal "For Construction of the Baikal-Amur Railway"

== See also ==
- 1977 in poetry
- List of Russian-language poets
