= Irkutsk State University =

University in Irkutsk

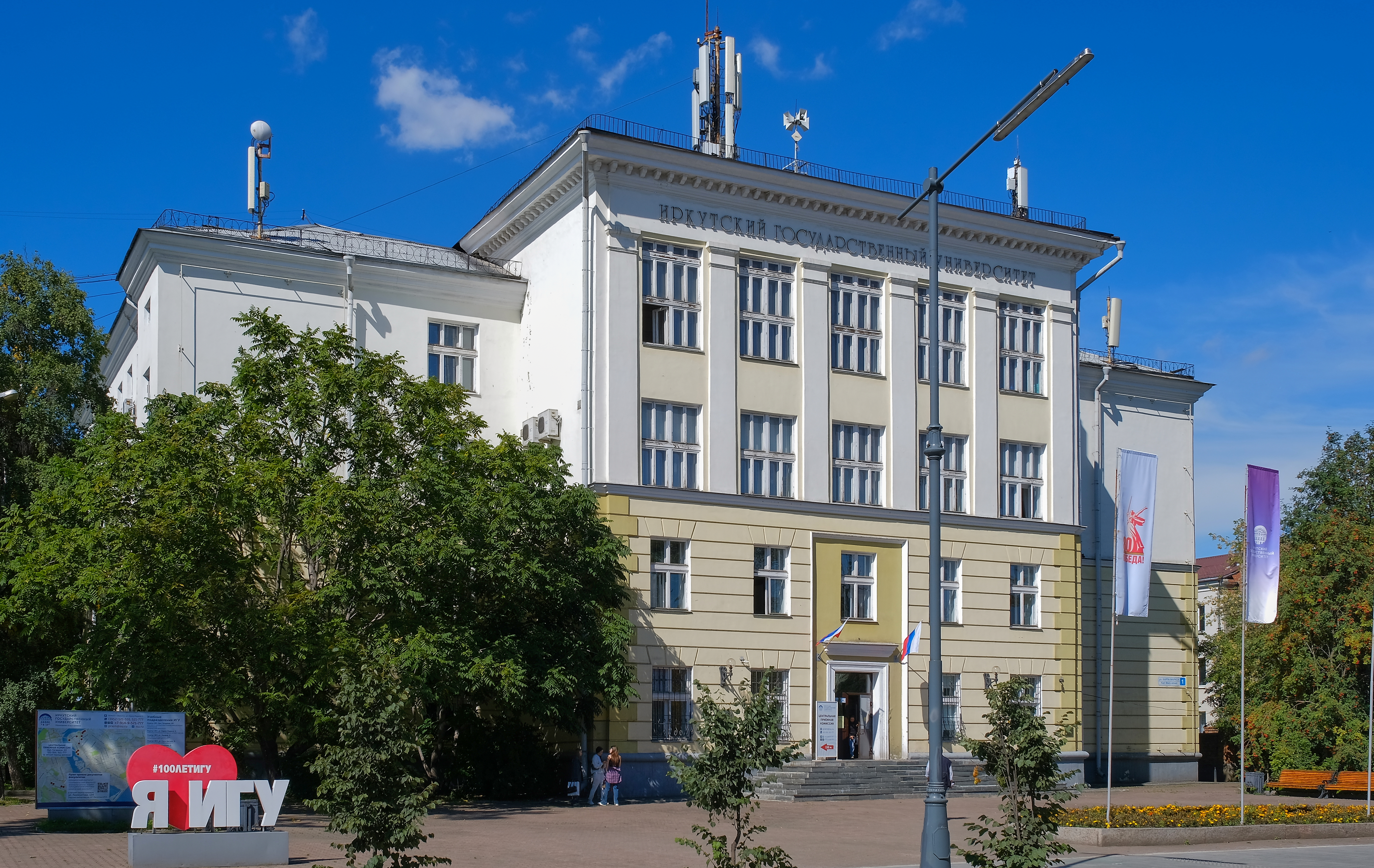
- Motto: Education that remains valuable at all times
- Type: Federal State-Funded Educational Institution of Higher Education
- Established: 1918
- Rector: Prof. Alexander Schmidt
- Faculty: 1155
- Students: 18,000
- Location: Irkutsk, Russia; 52.2767°N 104.278°E
- Website: http://www.isu.ru
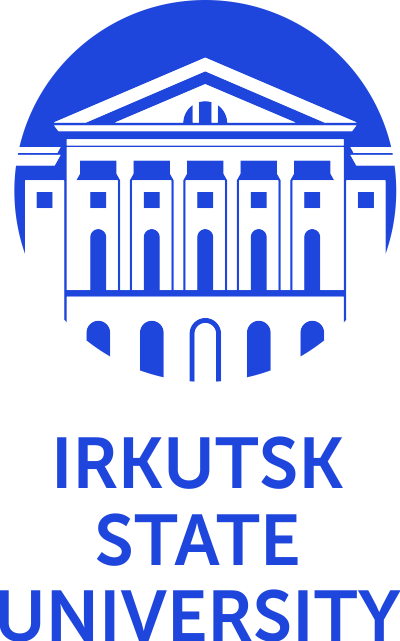

University rankings

Global – Overall
- QS World: 1401+ (2024)
- RUR World: 1086 (2026)
- THE World: 1501+ (2025)

Global – Science and engineering
- THE Physical Sciences: 1001+ (2025)

Regional – Overall
- QS Emerging Europe and Central Asia: 251-300 (2022)

National – Overall
- Interfax National: 37-38 (2026)

Irkutsk State University (Russian: Ирку́тский госуда́рственный университе́т) was founded in October 1918 in Irkutsk, Siberia. Nowadays Irkutsk State University is a scientific and educational institution training students in humanities, natural, technical and applied sciences. ISU facilities include 8 educational institutions, 11 faculties, the scientific library that is one of the largest University libraries in Russia. ISU offers bachelor, master, post-graduate programs for more than 18,000 students that have opportunity to specialize under the supervision of world-known scientists.

For decades, Irkutsk University has trained more than 80 thousand specialists, including State Prize winners and writers V. Rasputin, A. Vampilov, and M. Sergeev.

== History ==
Russian scientists, statesmen, patrons of art and science, such as Nikolai Yadrintsev, Afanasy Shchapov, P.A. Slovtsov, S.S. Shchukin, Grigory Potanin and others were founders of Irkutsk State University, many of whom were advocates of Siberian regionalism. The University was opened on October 27, 1918.

== Faculties and Institutes ==
At present, the University consists of 10 faculties and 10 educational institutions. Over 14500 thousand students, including 880 foreign students from 23 countries, and more than 1155 lecturers (142 Dr. Sc. and 625 Cand. Sc. professors) work there.

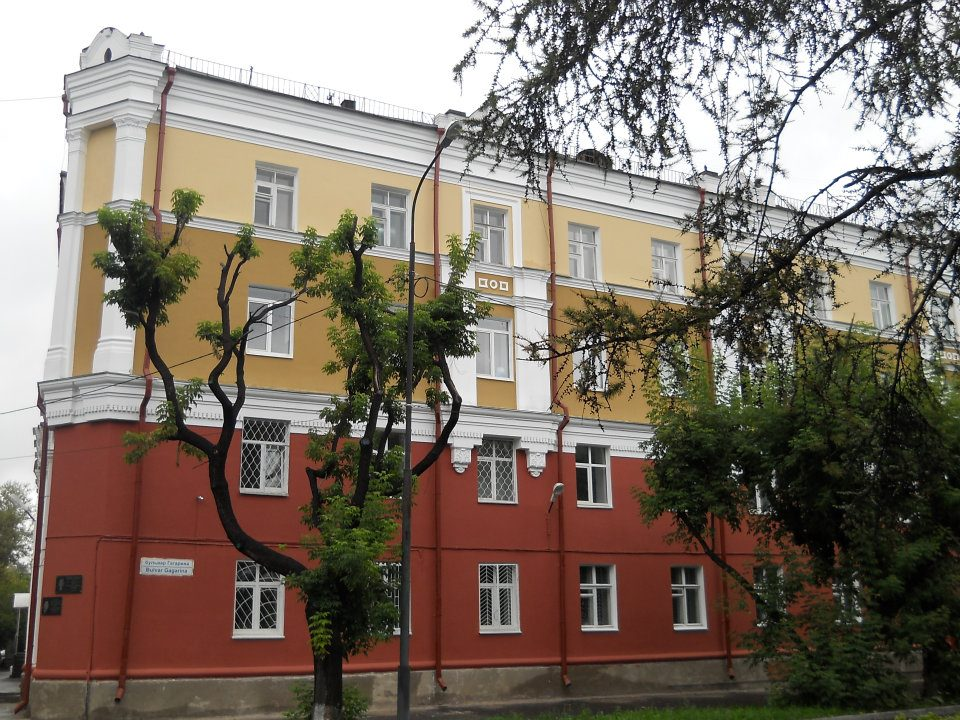
Irkutsk State University Faculty of History

- Baikal International Business School
- Institute of Biological Sciences
- Institute of Continuing Education
- Institute of Mathematics and Information Technologies
- Institute of Social Sciences
- Institute of Philology, Foreign Languages and Media Communication
- International Institute of Economics and Linguistics
- Pedagogical Institute
- Chinese Language Centre “ISU Confucius Institute”
- Law Institute
- Faculty of Geography
- Faculty of Geology
- Faculty of History
- Preparatory Faculty for Foreign Citizens
- SAF
- Department of Business and Management
- Faculty of Business-Communication & Computer Science
- Faculty of Psychology
- Faculty of Physics
- Faculty of Chemistry
- ISU College

== Notable faculty members ==
- Semyon Novgorodov, creator of a Yakut alphabet
- Ivan Naumovich Yazev, astronomer and head of the university's astronomical observatory from 1948 to 1955

== Notable alumni ==
- Valentin Rasputin, writer
- Alexander Vampilov, writer
- Erdenebalsuren Damdin, judge on the International Criminal Court
- Mark Sergeev, poet
- Evgeny Chernikin, zoologist and ecologist
