= Vengerovo =

Rural locality in Novosibirsk Oblast, Russia

Coordinates: 55°40′55″N 76°44′26″E

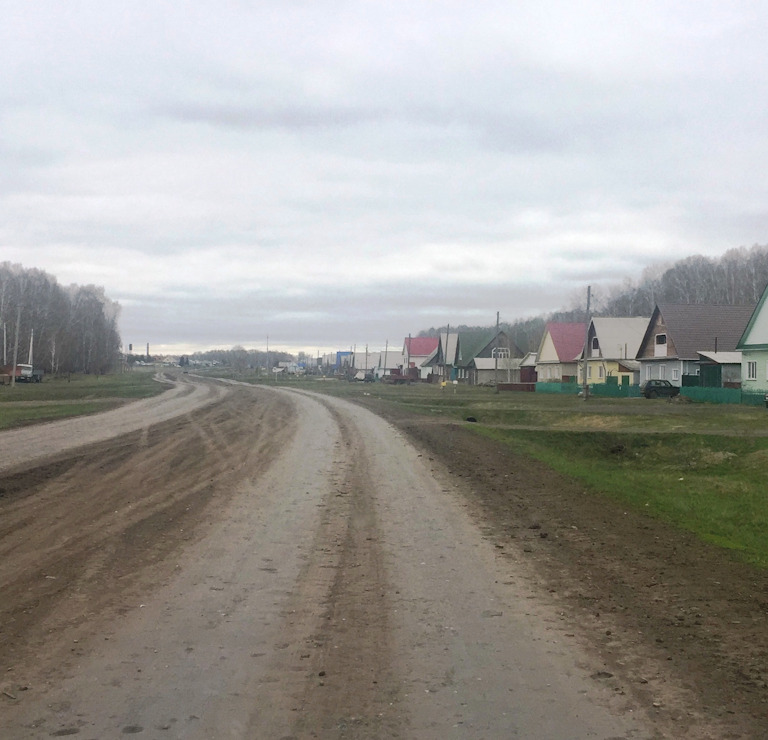

Vengerovo (Russian: Венгерово) is a rural locality (a selo) and the administrative center of Vengerovsky District, Novosibirsk Oblast, Russia. Population: 7,035 (2010 census); 7,165 (2002 census); 7,191 (1989 Soviet census).
