= Omsk State Agrarian University =

Agricultural university in Omsk, Russia

Coordinates: 55°01′22″N 73°18′46″E

- Федеральное государственное бюджетное образовательное учреждение высшего образования «Омский государственный аграрный университет имени П. А. Столыпина»
- Established: 1994
- Rector: Shumakova Oksana Viktorovna
- Location: Russia, Omsk
- Website: http://www.omgau.ru

Omsk State Agrarian University (Omsk SAU, Russian: Омский государственный аграрный университет имени П.А. Столыпина) is a public agricultural higher education institution located in the city of Omsk (Russia). The university has a 1133 hectares territory, and a green campus space located within the city. Omsk SAU consists of the main university located in Omsk, its branch in the city of Tara, and the University College of Agribusiness.

== History ==
The history of Omsk SAU dates back to February 24, 1918, when Omsk Agricultural Institute was founded. It became the first higher education institution in Omsk and the first agricultural one east of the Ural Mountains. The initial 1918 enrollment consisted of only 200 students studying at the agronomy department.

In 1919, it was planned to merge Omsk Agricultural Institute with recently created Omsk Polytechnic Institute. If it happened, the agricultural institution would transform into a faculty. Nevertheless, its independence was preserved. In 1922, it was renamed as Siberian Agricultural Academy, and in 1925 in became Siberian Institute of Agriculture and Forestry. In 1930, four associated institutes were organized on its basis, and three years later they were again merged into a single institution.

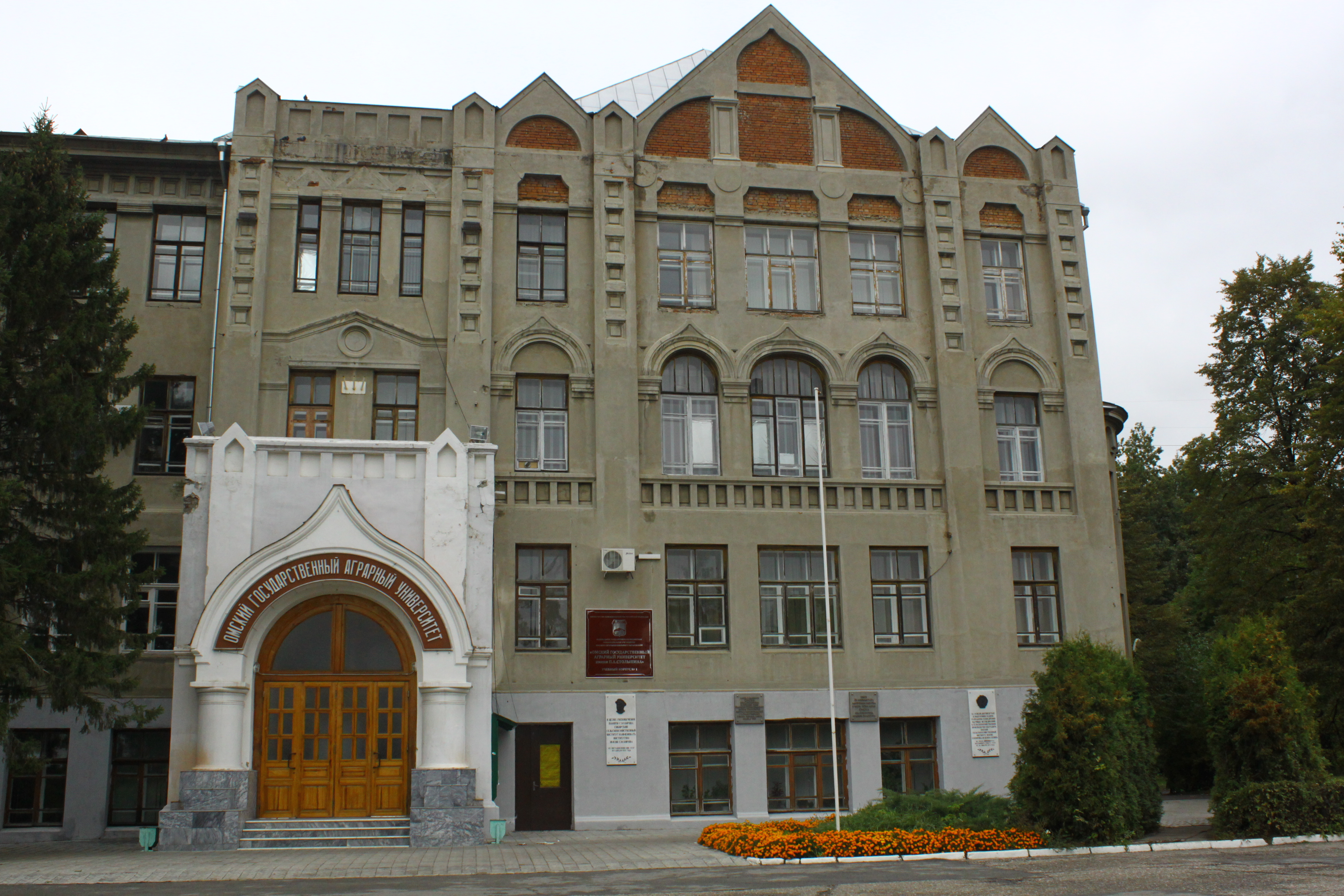
Omsk State Agrarian University, Main Entrance

Omsk SAU changed its name and structure several times more, until in 2011 the current name was approved to honor the Prime Minister of the Russian Empire Pyotr Arkadyevich Stolypin. During the Great Patriotic War, university buildings housed the workshops of the plant number 357 "Progress" that was evacuated from sieged Leningrad.

In 1971, the university was awarded the Order of Lenin.

In 1992, Advanced Training Institute was founded as part of Omsk SAU, and each year more than 2000 managers and agricultural specialists retrain there.

== University structure ==
The main university consists of 7 faculties:

1. Agrotechnological Faculty.
2. Faculty of Agrochemistry, Soil sciences, Ecology, Environmental engineering and Water Resources Exploitation
3. Faculty of Veterinary medicine.
4. Faculty of Land management.
5. Faculty of Technical Service of Agroindustrial Complexes.
6. Faculty of Zootechny, Commodity Science and Standardization.
7. Faculty of Economics.

The Tara branch of Omsk SAU has the Faculty of Higher Education and the Faculty of Vocational Education.

== Research activities ==
Omsk SAU scholars have founded 28 scientific schools of thought that are still being developed by university faculty staff and students. The university has gained experience in selective breeding and genetics of field crops. Scientists at Omsk SAU Genetics and Breeding Center have created varieties of high-yielding wheat resistant to adverse conditions. Also, varieties of purple and blue wheat were developed. Other research priorities of the university include studies in the field of zootechny, developing eco-friendly technologies of producing grain, improving the means for prevention and treatment of domestic animals diseases, etc. In 2020, Omsk SAU won a government megagrant for the creation of a laboratory to increase the nutritional value of wheat. This project will be led by an invited foreign scientist.

== University campus and infrastructure ==
The main campus consists of academic and administrative buildings and dormitories.

The main campus comprises:

- 10 dormitories, including one for university staff, foreign guests, and postgraduate students;
- 6 academic buildings;
- a student business incubator;
- laboratories;
- an arboretum;
- administrative and office buildings;
- Scientific Agricultural Library;

The second campus comprising the academic building of the Institute of Veterinary Medicine and Biotechnology and its two dormitories is located in the city center.

Shuttle transportation is not provided by the university. Omsk SAU neighbors with four other Omsk universities, so that a student can commute between their campuses on feet or by bus.

== International performance ==
Up to 15% of 9000 Omsk SAU students are foreign citizens, coming primarily from Kazakhstan and other CIS countries. Omsk SAU technically can accept non-Russian speaking students, but it does not have study programs in other languages than Russian.

Since the International Relations Department was founded in 1995, Omsk State Agrarian University has participated in scientific and educational international projects. Partnership network of Omsk SAU includes more than 100 institutions and organizations abroad. These are Grimme and Cargill companies, training centers DEULA-Nienburg and Logo e.V., Hartpury University and College, and University of Hohenheim.

== Omsk SAU reputation and rankings ==
Russian Ministry of Agriculture considers Omsk SAU a leading agrarian institution, placing it 7th among 54 participating HEIs.

The university holds 125th place in the ARES-2020 international rankings (category BB+), that proves good quality performance in teaching, research and reputation among employers.

According to Green Metric ranking, Omsk State Agrarian University takes the 5th place among agricultural universities in Russia, 31st place among 51 participants in Russia, and 641st place among 912 participants worldwide.

== Student life ==
There is a volunteer center "Globus", an eco-activist organization "The Earth – our common home", and a number of dancing, theater and music groups. Typical events students can participate in are visits to veterans’ houses, charity and patriotic events, help to handicapped people, visits to local schools to present the university to pupils, and sports competitions.

== Curricula ==
Academic year at Omsk State Agrarian University starts on September 1 and lasts till the beginning of July. It is divided into 2 semesters, with the winter exams starting in the middle of January and summer exams held in June–July. Before passing the exams, students have to pass so-called «zachety» (Russian: зачёты) which are typically pass-fail type small exams without grades.

Students are expected to pass internships to practise theoretical skills they gain at the university. Typically, these internships are organized in the end of summer or in fall. They are held on partner enterprises of Omsk SAU.

There are also certain detailed rules and requirements that are used in each of the study programs.

== Tuition fees and scholarships ==
If a foreign citizens decides to study on commercial basis, he is obliged to pay annual tuition fee of approximately 137 000 rubles (Bachelor's studies), 145 000 rubles (Master's studies) or 155 000 rubles (postgraduate studies).

== Notable scholars and teachers ==
- Ivan Naumovich Yazev – Soviet astronomer, graduated from and later taught geodesy at the university
