= Vengerovsky District =

Vengerovsky District Венгеровский район (Russian)
- District
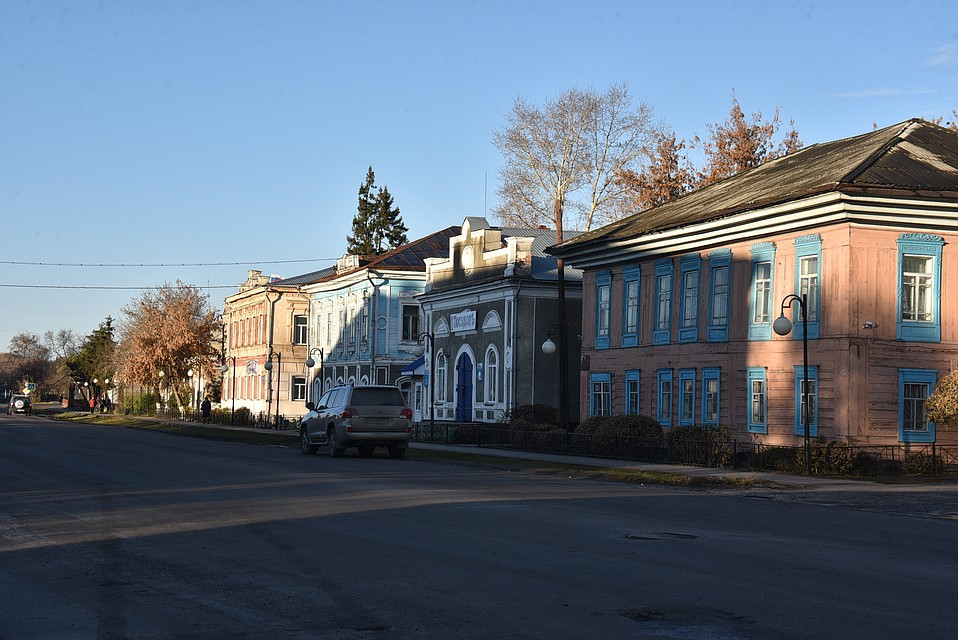
- Lenin street in Vengerovo

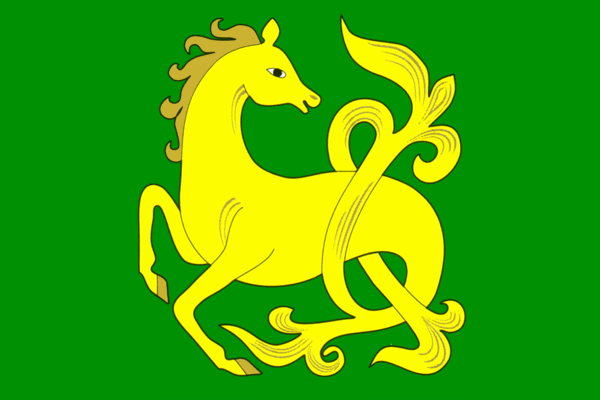
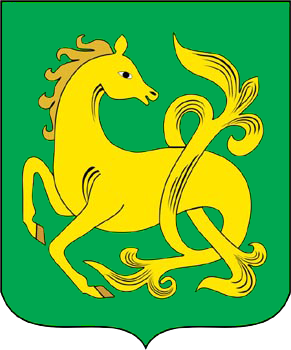
- Flag Coat of arms
- Location of Vengerovsky District in Novosibirsk Oblast
- Coordinates: 55°27′N 76°58′E
- Country: Russia
- Federal subject: Novosibirsk Oblast
- Established: 1925
- Administrative center: Vengerovo

Area
  - Total: 6,382.71 km^{2} (2,464.38 sq mi)

Population (2010 Census)
  - Total: 20,446
  - Estimate (2016): 18,976
  - Density: 3.2033/km^{2} (8.2966/sq mi)
  - Urban: 0%
  - Rural: 100%

Administrative structure
  - Inhabited localities: 47 rural localities

Municipal structure
  - Municipally incorporated as: Vengerovsky Municipal District
  - Municipal divisions: 0 urban settlements, 20 rural settlements
- Time zone: UTC+7 (MSK+4)
- OKTMO ID: 50608000
- Website: https://vengerovo.nso.ru

Population of Vengerovsky District
- 2010 Census: 20,446
- 2002 Census: 22,877
- 1989 Census: 24,866
- 1979 Census: 26,407

Vengerovsky District (Russian: Ве́нгеровский райо́н) is an administrative and municipal district (raion), one of the thirty in Novosibirsk Oblast, Russia. It is located in the west of the oblast. The area of the district is 6,382.71 square kilometers (2,464.38 sq mi). Its administrative center is the rural locality (a selo) of Vengerovo. As of the 2010 Census, the total population of the district was 20,446, with the population of Vengerovo accounting for 34.4% of that number.

== Notable residents ==
- Grigory Eliseev (1821–1891), journalist, editor, and publisher, born in the village of Spasskoe
